= 1975 Philadelphia Phillies season =

Major League Baseball season

1975 Philadelphia Phillies
- League: National League
- Division: East
- Ballpark: Veterans Stadium
- City: Philadelphia
- Owners: R. R. M. "Ruly" Carpenter III
- General managers: Paul Owens
- Managers: Danny Ozark
- Television: WPHL-TV
- Radio: WCAU (By Saam, Harry Kalas, Richie Ashburn)

The 1975 Philadelphia Phillies season was the 93rd in the history of the franchise. The Phillies finished in second place in the National League East with a record of 86–76, six and a half games behind the NL East champion Pittsburgh Pirates. As a result, the Phillies had their first winning season in eight years.

== Offseason ==
- December 3, 1974: Del Unser, Mac Scarce and John Stearns were traded by the Phillies to the New York Mets for Tug McGraw, Don Hahn, and Dave Schneck.
- January 30, 1975: José Moreno was as an amateur free agent signed by the Phillies.
- February 5, 1975: Orlando Isales was signed as an amateur free agent by the Phillies.

== Regular season ==
Early in the 1975 season, Phillies general manager Paul Owens wanted a righthanded power hitter and a first baseman with more power than Tommy Hutton, a left-handed contact hitter. Both Mike Schmidt and Dave Cash lobbied Owens to acquire Dick Allen. Allen had to be persuaded by several of his future teammates that both the organizational and racial climate in Philadelphia had changed for the better since his 1969 departure from the team.

On May 4, the Phillies traded their first baseman Willie Montañez to the Giants for Garry Maddox which provided a bat for the outfield and opened first base for Allen. The Phillies acquired Allen three days later on May 7, 1975.

Fans welcomed Allen's return. On May 14, 1975, 30,908 fans came to Veterans Stadium for Allen's return to Philadelphia and saw Steve Carlton shut out Cincinnati by the score of 4 to 0. Allen played first base, batted fifth between Greg Luzinski and Mike Schmidt and was given a standing ovation when he stepped into the batter's box in a Phillies uniform for the first time since the final game of the 1969 season. Allen lined a two-out single to center, prompting another standing ovation.

The Phillies celebrated the 25th anniversary of the 1950 pennant winning team on August 16, 1975 prior to the team's matchup with the San Diego Padres. The organization held an on field ceremony into which 1950 MVP Jim Konstanty rode on a 1950s-era fire engine. The team presented the players with World Series rings and staged an old-timers game.

=== Season standings ===
NL East
Team	W	L	Pct.	GB	Home	Road
Pittsburgh Pirates	92	69	.571	—	52‍–‍28	40‍–‍41
Philadelphia Phillies	86	76	.531	6½	51‍–‍30	35‍–‍46
New York Mets	82	80	.506	10½	42‍–‍39	40‍–‍41
St. Louis Cardinals	82	80	.506	10½	45‍–‍36	37‍–‍44
Chicago Cubs	75	87	.463	17½	42‍–‍39	33‍–‍48
Montreal Expos	75	87	.463	17½	39‍–‍42	36‍–‍45

=== Record vs. opponents ===
1975 National League record Sources:
Team	ATL	CHC	CIN	HOU	LAD	MON	NYM	PHI	PIT	SD	SF	STL
Atlanta	—	5–7	3–15	12–6	8–10	8–4	4–8	5–7	4–8	7–11	8–9	3–9
Chicago	7–5	—	1–11	7–5	5–7	9–9	7–11	12–6	6–12	5–7	5–7	11–7
Cincinnati	15–3	11–1	—	13–5	8–10	8–4	8–4	7–5	6–6	11–7	13–5	8–4
Houston	6–12	5–7	5–13	—	6–12	8–4	4–8	6–6	6–5	9–9	5–13	4–8–1
Los Angeles	10–8	7–5	10–8	12–6	—	5–7	6–6	7–5	5–7	11–7	10–8	5–7
Montreal	4–8	9–9	4–8	4–8	7–5	—	10–8	7–11	7–11	7–5	5–7	11–7
New York	8–4	11–7	4–8	8–4	6–6	8–10	—	7–11	5–13	8–4	8–4	9–9
Philadelphia	7-5	6–12	5–7	6–6	5–7	11–7	11–7	—	11–7	7–5	7–5	10–8
Pittsburgh	8–4	12–6	6–6	5–6	7–5	11–7	13–5	7–11	—	8–4	5–7	10–8
San Diego	11–7	7–5	7–11	9–9	7–11	5–7	4–8	5–7	4–8	—	8–10	4–8
San Francisco	9–8	7–5	5–13	13–5	8–10	7–5	4–8	5–7	7–5	10–8	—	5–7
St. Louis	9–3	7–11	4–8	8–4–1	7–5	7–11	9–9	8–10	8–10	8–4	7–5	—

=== Notable transactions ===
- May 4, 1975: Willie Montañez was traded by the Phillies to the San Francisco Giants for Garry Maddox.
- May 7, 1975: Jim Essian, Barry Bonnell, and $150,000 were traded by the Phillies to the Atlanta Braves for Dick Allen and Johnny Oates.
- June 3, 1975: 1975 Major League Baseball draft
  - Dickie Noles was drafted by the Phillies in the 4th round. Player signed June 15, 1975.
  - Rick Leach was drafted by the Phillies in the 11th round, but did not sign.

=== Game log ===
Legend
	Phillies win
	Phillies loss
	Postponement
**Bold**	Phillies team member

1975 Game Log
Overall Record: 86–76
April (8–10)

#	Date	Opponent	Score	Win	Loss	Save	Attendance	Record
1	April 8	@ Mets	1–2	Tom Seaver (1–0)	**Steve Carlton** (0–1)	None	18,527	0–1
2	April 10	@ Mets	3–2 (11)	**Ron Schueler** (1–0)	Harry Parker (0–1)	**Cy Acosta** (1)	5,964	1–1
3	April 11	Cardinals	3–6	Lynn McGlothen (1–0)	**Wayne Twitchell** (0–1)	Al Hrabosky (2)	44,834	1–2
4	April 12	Cardinals	5–7	Mike Garman (1–0)	**Gene Garber** (0–1)	None	11,101	1–3
5	April 13	Cardinals	2–0	**Tom Underwood** (1–0)	Bob Forsch (1–1)	None	13,539	2–3
6	April 14	Mets	4–3	**Gene Garber** (1–1)	Jerry Cram (0–1)	None	10,626	3–3
–	April 15	Mets	Postponed (rain); Makeup: September 26 as a traditional double-header					
7	April 16	Cubs	3–9	Bill Bonham (1–0)	**Steve Carlton** (0–2)	None	8,294	3–4
8	April 17	Cubs	9–10	Ken Frailing (1–1)	**Wayne Twitchell** (0–2)	None	6,259	3–5
9	April 18	@ Expos	6–3	**Tom Underwood** (2–0)	Steve Renko (0–1)	**Gene Garber** (1)	21,274	4–5
10	April 19	@ Expos	3–0	**Jim Lonborg** (1–0)	Dennis Blair (0–2)	None	8,154	5–5
–	April 20	@ Expos	Postponed (cold weather); Makeup: August 1 as a traditional double-header					
11	April 22	@ Cubs	7–5	**Wayne Twitchell** (1–2)	Bill Bonham (1–1)	None	6,525	6–5
12	April 23	@ Cubs	3–9	Ray Burris (2–0)	**Tom Underwood** (2–1)	Oscar Zamora (1)	3,228	6–6
13	April 24	@ Cubs	1–4	Steve Stone (3–0)	**Jim Lonborg** (1–1)	None	2,323	6–7
14	April 25	@ Pirates	2–3	Bruce Kison (2–0)	**Steve Carlton** (0–3)	Dave Giusti (2)	5,726	6–8
15	April 26	@ Pirates	3–7	Jim Rooker (2–0)	**Wayne Twitchell** (1–3)	None	13,120	6–9
16	April 27	@ Pirates	0–2	Dock Ellis (1–2)	**Tom Underwood** (2–2)	None	14,074	6–10
17	April 29	Expos	5–0	**Jim Lonborg** (2–1)	Dennis Blair (0–3)	None	5,477	7–10
18	April 30	Expos	2–1	**Steve Carlton** (1–3)	Steve Rogers (0–4)	None	8,750	8–10

May (14–13)

#	Date	Opponent	Score	Win	Loss	Save	Attendance	Record
19	May 2	Pirates	9–5	**Wayne Twitchell** (2–3)	Bruce Kison (2–1)	**Tug McGraw** (1)	20,257	9–10
20	May 3 (1)	Pirates	6–2	**Tom Underwood** (3–2)	Jim Rooker (2–1)	**Gene Garber** (2)	see 2nd game	10–10
21	May 3 (2)	Pirates	4–3 (11)	**Tug McGraw** (1–0)	Ramón Hernández (0–1)	None	44,501	11–10
–	May 4	Pirates	Postponed (rain); Makeup: June 24 as a traditional double-header					
22	May 5	@ Cardinals	3–11	Bob Gibson (1–3)	**Steve Carlton** (1–4)	None	9,198	11–11
–	May 6	@ Cardinals	Postponed (rain); Makeup: July 25 as a traditional double-header					
23	May 7	@ Cardinals	4–1	**Wayne Twitchell** (3–3)	Bob Forsch (2–3)	**Tug McGraw** (2)	9,735	12–11
24	May 8	@ Cardinals	6–2	**Jim Lonborg** (3–1)	John Denny (2–2)	None	10,293	13–11
25	May 9	@ Braves	1–3	Roric Harrison (2–1)	**Tom Underwood** (3–3)	None	7,444	13–12
26	May 10	@ Braves	1–2 (11)	Phil Niekro (2–3)	**Gene Garber** (1–2)	None	6,510	13–13
27	May 11	@ Braves	3–7	Buzz Capra (3–4)	**Wayne Twitchell** (3–4)	None	6,456	13–14
–	May 12	Reds	Postponed (rain); Makeup: May 15 as a traditional double-header					
28	May 13	Reds	4–0	**Tom Underwood** (4–3)	Gary Nolan (1–3)	None	11,634	14–14
29	May 14	Reds	4–0	**Steve Carlton** (2–4)	Pat Darcy (1–2)	None	30,908	15–14
30	May 15 (1)	Reds	6–3	**Tug McGraw** (2–0)	Don Gullett (4–2)	None	see 2nd game	16–14
31	May 15 (2)	Reds	5–3	**Gene Garber** (2–2)	Clay Carroll (3–4)	**Tug McGraw** (3)	24,038	17–14
32	May 16	Braves	12–8	**Gene Garber** (3–2)	Buzz Capra (3–5)	None	18,710	18–14
33	May 17	Braves	9–8	**Gene Garber** (4–2)	Phil Niekro (3–4)	None	30,369	19–14
34	May 18	Braves	5–1	**Tom Underwood** (5–3)	Ron Reed (4–4)	None	25,905	20–14
35	May 19	@ Astros	2–4	Tom Griffin (2–5)	**Steve Carlton** (2–5)	Wayne Granger (4)	7,049	20–15
36	May 20	@ Astros	2–4	Ken Forsch (2–2)	**Tug McGraw** (2–1)	Joe Niekro (2)	7,211	20–16
37	May 21	@ Astros	0–4	Larry Dierker (5–4)	**Wayne Twitchell** (3–5)	None	8,135	20–17
38	May 23	@ Reds	2–5	Gary Nolan (3–3)	**Larry Christenson** (0–1)	Clay Carroll (3)	36,197	20–18
39	May 24	@ Reds	2–3 (11)	Clay Carroll (4–4)	**Tug McGraw** (2–2)	None	36,165	20–19
40	May 25	@ Reds	3–4	Clay Kirby (3–3)	**Jim Lonborg** (3–2)	Rawly Eastwick (1)	25,726	20–20
41	May 26	Giants	1–0 (11)	**Tug McGraw** (3–2)	Ed Halicki (1–1)	None	15,693	21–20
42	May 27	Giants	0–1 (10)	John Montefusco (3–2)	**Gene Garber** (4–3)	None	18,735	21–21
43	May 28	Giants	8–6	**Steve Carlton** (3–5)	Pete Falcone (4–4)	**Tug McGraw** (4)	15,706	22–21
44	May 30	Astros	0–5	Doug Konieczny (3–6)	**Jim Lonborg** (3–3)	None	12,566	22–22
45	May 31	Astros	3–15	J. R. Richard (4–3)	**Wayne Twitchell** (3–6)	None	18,094	22–23

June (20–11)

#	Date	Opponent	Score	Win	Loss	Save	Attendance	Record
46	June 1	Astros	5–4	**Tom Underwood** (6–3)	Larry Dierker (5–5)	**Larry Christenson** (1)	22,278	23–23
47	June 2	Padres	5–1	**Steve Carlton** (4–5)	Dave Freisleben (3–6)	None	9,348	24–23
48	June 3	Padres	12–1	**Jim Lonborg** (4–3)	Dan Spillner (2–6)	None	10,047	25–23
49	June 4	Padres	7–2	**Wayne Twitchell** (4–6)	Randy Jones (7–3)	**Tug McGraw** (5)	12,443	26–23
50	June 6	Dodgers	2–3	Burt Hooton (4–5)	**Tom Underwood** (6–4)	Mike Marshall (2)	38,357	26–24
51	June 7	Dodgers	4–0	**Steve Carlton** (5–5)	Doug Rau (5–6)	None	41,094	27–24
52	June 8	Dodgers	4–2	**Jim Lonborg** (5–3)	Don Sutton (10–4)	None	41,334	28–24
53	June 9	@ Padres	3–8	Randy Jones (8–3)	**Wayne Twitchell** (4–7)	None	30,948	28–25
54	June 10	@ Padres	7–0	**Larry Christenson** (1–1)	Dan Spillner (2–7)	None	15,909	29–25
55	June 11	@ Giants	3–8	Mike Caldwell (3–5)	**Tom Underwood** (6–5)	None	3,472	29–26
56	June 12	@ Giants	4–1	**Steve Carlton** (6–5)	Ed Halicki (2–2)	None	3,869	30–26
57	June 13	@ Dodgers	5–1	**Jim Lonborg** (6–3)	Andy Messersmith (9–3)	None	33,970	31–26
58	June 14	@ Dodgers	3–4	Burt Hooton (5–5)	**Tug McGraw** (3–3)	Mike Marshall (3)	52,299	31–27
59	June 15	@ Dodgers	4–3	**Gene Garber** (5–3)	Mike Marshall (2–5)	None	40,959	32–27
60	June 16	@ Cubs	7–9	Geoff Zahn (2–4)	**Gene Garber** (5–4)	Ken Frailing (1)	9,353	32–28
61	June 17	@ Cubs	5–9	Tom Dettore (1–0)	**Jim Lonborg** (6–4)	None	6,834	32–29
62	June 18	@ Cubs	9–7	**Gene Garber** (6–4)	Bob Locker (0–1)	None	20,807	33–29
63	June 19	@ Cubs	6–3 (14)	**Tug McGraw** (4–3)	Darold Knowles (2–3)	None	15,170	34–29
64	June 20	Expos	7–4	**Tom Underwood** (7–5)	Steve Renko (2–6)	**Tug McGraw** (6)	33,324	35–29
65	June 21	Expos	1–5	Dennis Blair (4–8)	**Jim Lonborg** (6–5)	None	28,323	35–30
66	June 22 (1)	Expos	0–4	Steve Rogers (5–4)	**Ron Schueler** (1–1)	None	see 2nd game	35–31
67	June 22 (2)	Expos	4–3	**Gene Garber** (7–4)	Chuck Taylor (1–2)	None	31,119	36–31
68	June 23	Pirates	6–5	**Tom Hilgendorf** (1–0)	Larry Demery (3–2)	**Gene Garber** (3)	34,759	37–31
69	June 24 (1)	Pirates	6–3	**Larry Christenson** (2–1)	Jerry Reuss (8–5)	**Tug McGraw** (7)	see 2nd game	38–31
70	June 24 (2)	Pirates	8–1	**Tom Underwood** (8–5)	Bruce Kison (7–3)	None	50,463	39–31
71	June 25	Pirates	7–6 (13)	**Ron Schueler** (2–1)	Dave Giusti (2–3)	None	34,171	40–31
72	June 27	@ Mets	2–4	Jon Matlack (9–5)	**Wayne Twitchell** (4–8)	None	27,935	40–32
73	June 28	@ Mets	2–5	Randy Tate (3–6)	**Steve Carlton** (6–6)	None	37,250	40–33
74	June 29 (1)	@ Mets	9–6	**Larry Christenson** (3–1)	Jerry Koosman (6–6)	**Tug McGraw** (8)	see 2nd game	41–33
75	June 29 (2)	@ Mets	4–3 (12)	**Tug McGraw** (5–3)	Tom Hall (1–2)	None	45,723	42–33
76	June 30	Cardinals	2–4	Bob Forsch (8–6)	**Jim Lonborg** (6–6)	Al Hrabosky (11)	28,264	42–34

July (17–12)

#	Date	Opponent	Score	Win	Loss	Save	Attendance	Record
77	July 1	Cardinals	5–6	Lynn McGlothen (10–5)	**Wayne Twitchell** (4–9)	Al Hrabosky (12)	22,544	42–35
78	July 2	Cardinals	5–3	**Steve Carlton** (7–6)	Ron Reed (8–8)	None	21,843	43–35
79	July 3	Cardinals	7–4	**Tom Underwood** (9–5)	Bob Gibson (2–7)	None	16,068	44–35
80	July 4	Mets	3–4	Tom Seaver (12–4)	**Tug McGraw** (5–4)	Rick Baldwin (4)	55,301	44–36
81	July 5 (1)	Mets	8–2	**Ron Schueler** (3–1)	Randy Tate (3–7)	None	see 2nd game	45–36
82	July 5 (2)	Mets	10–7	**Jim Lonborg** (7–6)	Nino Espinosa (0–1)	**Gene Garber** (4)	50,137	46–36
83	July 6	Mets	8–6	**Wayne Twitchell** (5–9)	Jon Matlack (10–6)	**Gene Garber** (5)	27,037	47–36
84	July 7	@ Reds	3–7	Pat Darcy (4–5)	**Steve Carlton** (7–7)	None	25,096	47–37
85	July 8	@ Reds	1–2	Gary Nolan (8–5)	**Tom Underwood** (9–6)	Rawly Eastwick (4)	28,479	47–38
86	July 9	@ Reds	7–9	Pedro Borbón (5–1)	**Gene Garber** (7–5)	None	28,789	47–39
87	July 11	@ Astros	2–1	**Larry Christenson** (4–1)	Doug Konieczny (4–10)	None	16,394	48–39
88	July 12	@ Astros	14–2	**Steve Carlton** (8–7)	J. R. Richard (6–4)	None	14,520	49–39
89	July 13	@ Astros	5–9	Ken Forsch (3–6)	**Tom Underwood** (9–7)	Dave Roberts (1)	12,870	49–40
–	July 15	**1975 Major League Baseball All-Star Game at Milwaukee County Stadium in Milwaukee**						
90	July 17	Astros	6–5 (11)	**Tug McGraw** (6–4)	Ken Forsch (3–7)	None	18,026	50–40
91	July 18	Astros	7–4	**Tom Hilgendorf** (2–0)	J. R. Richard (6–5)	**Gene Garber** (6)	24,072	51–40
92	July 19	Astros	1–0	**Larry Christenson** (5–1)	Larry Dierker (8–10)	None	30,983	52–40
93	July 20	Reds	11–4	**Tom Underwood** (10–7)	Clay Kirby (7–4)	**Gene Garber** (7)	44,134	53–40
94	July 21	Reds	4–10	Pat Darcy (5–5)	**Ron Schueler** (3–2)	None	43,698	53–41
95	July 22	Braves	1–0	**Steve Carlton** (9–7)	Carl Morton (12–10)	None	20,052	54–41
96	July 23	Braves	3–2	**Jim Lonborg** (8–6)	Bruce Dal Canton (0–4)	None	28,268	55–41
97	July 24	Braves	4–5	Phil Niekro (10–7)	**Larry Christenson** (5–2)	None	21,706	55–42
98	July 25 (1)	@ Cardinals	3–4	Al Hrabosky (9–2)	**Gene Garber** (7–6)	None	see 2nd game	55–43
99	July 25 (2)	@ Cardinals	5–2	**Ron Schueler** (4–2)	John Curtis (6–8)	**Tug McGraw** (9)	36,127	56–43
100	July 26	@ Cardinals	9–4	**Steve Carlton** (10–7)	Eric Rasmussen (1–1)	None	36,350	57–43
101	July 27	@ Cardinals	6–9	Bob Gibson (3–8)	**Tom Hilgendorf** (2–1)	Mike Garman (8)	22,046	57–44
102	July 28	@ Pirates	5–2	**Larry Christenson** (6–2)	Bruce Kison (9–6)	None	30,221	58–44
103	July 29	@ Pirates	5–1	**Tom Underwood** (11–7)	Dock Ellis (7–7)	None	33,340	59–44
104	July 30	@ Pirates	1–8	Jerry Reuss (12–6)	**Steve Carlton** (10–8)	None	43,260	59–45
105	July 31	@ Expos	4–7	Dan Warthen (5–4)	**Ron Schueler** (4–3)	Dale Murray (5)	13,510	59–46

August (13–17)

#	Date	Opponent	Score	Win	Loss	Save	Attendance	Record
106	August 1 (1)	@ Expos	8–6 (10)	**Gene Garber** (8–6)	Dale Murray (4–5)	None	see 2nd game	60–46
107	August 1 (2)	@ Expos	4–6	Fred Scherman (2–4)	**Tom Hilgendorf** (2–2)	Dale Murray (6)	17,820	60–47
108	August 2	@ Expos	3–4	Dale Murray (5–5)	**Tom Underwood** (11–8)	None	16,101	60–48
109	August 3	@ Expos	5–4 (10)	**Tug McGraw** (7–4)	Dale Murray (5–6)	**Gene Garber** (8)	15,126	61–48
110	August 4	Cubs	2–3^{^{[a]}}	Steve Stone (9–5)	**Tom Hilgendorf** (2–3)	Paul Reuschel (1)	16,285	61–49
111	August 5	Cubs	13–5	**Dick Ruthven** (1–0)	Bill Bonham (10–8)	None	19,611	62–49
–	August 6	Cubs	Postponed (rain); Makeup: September 5 as a traditional double-header					
112	August 7	Cubs	3–5	Rick Reuschel (8–12)	**Larry Christenson** (6–3)	None	20,259	62–50
113	August 8	Giants	5–4	**Gene Garber** (9–6)	Randy Moffitt (4–4)	None	31,026	63–50
114	August 9	Giants	11–4	**Steve Carlton** (11–8)	John Montefusco (10–6)	None	43,504	64–50
115	August 10	Giants	1–8	Jim Barr (10–9)	**Dick Ruthven** (1–1)	None	35,405	64–51
116	August 11	Dodgers	1–7	Andy Messersmith (14–11)	**Larry Christenson** (6–4)	None	33,175	64–52
117	August 12	Dodgers	6–7 (10)	Mike Marshall (8–11)	**Gene Garber** (9–7)	None	36,512	64–53
118	August 13	Dodgers	4–5	Burt Hooton (10–9)	**Steve Carlton** (11–9)	Mike Marshall (10)		64–54
119	August 15	Padres	4–3	**Tom Hilgendorf** (3–3)	Joe McIntosh (8–11)	**Tug McGraw** (10)	30,601	65–54
120	August 16	Padres	1–5	Randy Jones (16–7)	**Tug McGraw** (7–5)	None	40,127	65–55
121	August 17	Padres	10–4	**Tom Underwood** (12–8)	Dave Freisleben (5–13)	**Gene Garber** (9)	29,317	66–55
122	August 18	@ Braves	6–3	**Tom Hilgendorf** (4–3)	Phil Niekro (12–11)	None	4,320	67–55
123	August 19	@ Braves	4–6	Max León (2–1)	**Gene Garber** (9–8)	None	4,470	67–56
124	August 20	@ Braves	4–1	**Larry Christenson** (7–4)	Carl Morton (15–13)	**Tug McGraw** (11)	4,704	68–56
125	August 22	@ Padres	6–5	**Tom Hilgendorf** (5–3)	Bill Greif (3–5)	**Gene Garber** (10)	13,426	69–56
126	August 23	@ Padres	3–8	Dan Spillner (5–10)	**Steve Carlton** (11–10)	Danny Frisella (8)	9,578	69–57
127	August 24 (1)	@ Padres	2–7	Randy Jones (17–7)	**Dick Ruthven** (1–2)	None	see 2nd game	69–58
128	August 24 (2)	@ Padres	6–7 (12)	Bill Greif (4–5)	**Ron Schueler** (4–4)	None	17,870	69–59
129	August 25	@ Dodgers	4–2	**Larry Christenson** (8–4)	Andy Messersmith (14–13)	**Gene Garber** (11)	20,048	70–59
130	August 26	@ Dodgers	1–8	Doug Rau (11–9)	**Tom Underwood** (12–9)	None	20,273	70–60
131	August 27	@ Dodgers	0–10	Burt Hooton (13–9)	**Steve Carlton** (11–11)	None	20,753	70–61
132	August 28	@ Giants	8–5	**Tom Hilgendorf** (6–3)	Jim Barr (11–12)	None	4,190	71–61
133	August 29	@ Giants	3–1	**Larry Christenson** (9–4)	Ed Halicki (8–11)	**Tug McGraw** (12)	5,007	72–61
134	August 30	@ Giants	1–4	Pete Falcone (10–9)	**Tom Underwood** (12–10)	None	5,663	72–62
135	August 31	@ Giants	4–5	John Montefusco (12–7)	**Steve Carlton** (11–12)	Charlie Williams (3)	8,884	72–63

September (14–13)

#	Date	Opponent	Score	Win	Loss	Save	Attendance	Record
136	September 1	Expos	5–6	Dale Murray (10–7)	**Gene Garber** (9–9)	None	12,925	72–64
137	September 2	Expos	3–4	Dennis Blair (8–14)	**Larry Christenson** (9–5)	Dale Murray (9)	15,232	72–65
138	September 3	Expos	6–3	**Tom Underwood** (13–10)	Don Carrithers (2–2)	**Gene Garber** (12)	15,597	73–65
139	September 5 (1)	Cubs	3–4	Bill Bonham (12–13)	**Steve Carlton** (11–13)	Paul Reuschel (4)	see 2nd game	73–66
140	September 5 (2)	Cubs	6–3	**Tug McGraw** (8–5)	Paul Reuschel (1–2)	None	32,041	74–66
141	September 6	Cubs	6–7	Steve Stone (12–7)	**Gene Garber** (9–10)	Darold Knowles (12)	26,554	74–67
142	September 7	Cubs	4–6	Ray Burris (13–10)	**Wayne Twitchell** (5–10)	Rick Reuschel (1)	30,071	74–68
143	September 8	Cardinals	6–3^{^{[b]}}	**Tom Underwood** (14–10)	Ron Reed (12–10)	**Tug McGraw** (13)	22,768	75–68
144	September 9	Cardinals	6–2	**Steve Carlton** (12–13)	John Denny (9–5)	None	13,764	76–68
145	September 10	@ Expos	5–1	**Wayne Simpson** (1–0)	Steve Renko (5–12)	**Gene Garber** (13)	9,216	77–68
146	September 11	@ Expos	5–0 (7)	**Larry Christenson** (10–5)	Steve Rogers (10–11)	None	7,457	78–68
147	September 13	@ Cubs	1–4	Ray Burris (14–10)	**Tom Underwood** (14–11)	None	13,283	78–69
148	September 14	@ Cubs	13–7	**Steve Carlton** (13–13)	Steve Stone (12–8)	None	16,294	79–69
149	September 15	@ Cardinals	6–7	Al Hrabosky (12–3)	**Gene Garber** (9–11)	Harry Parker (3)	9,955	79–70
150	September 16	@ Cardinals	4–3 (13)	**Tom Hilgendorf** (7–3)	Mike Garman (3–7)	**Gene Garber** (14)	11,239	80–70
151	September 17	Pirates	1–9	Bruce Kison (11–11)	**Tom Underwood** (14–12)	None	38,085	80–71
152	September 18	Pirates	4–1	**Steve Carlton** (14–13)	Dock Ellis (8–9)	None	27,093	81–71
153	September 19	@ Mets	4–3	**Tug McGraw** (9–5)	Skip Lockwood (1–2)	None	16,676	82–71
154	September 20	@ Mets	7–9 (11)	Bob Apodaca (2–3)	**Gene Garber** (9–12)	None	18,863	82–72
155	September 21	@ Mets	4–2	**Dick Ruthven** (2–2)	Jon Matlack (16–12)	**Tug McGraw** (14)	52,144	83–72
156	September 22	@ Pirates	3–11	Bruce Kison (12–11)	**Tom Underwood** (14–13)	Kent Tekulve (4)	13,176	83–73
157	September 23	@ Pirates	1–3	Bob Moose (2–2)	**Steve Carlton** (14–14)	None	6,445	83–74
158	September 24	@ Pirates	8–1	**Larry Christenson** (11–5)	Larry Demery (7–5)	None	6,253	84–74
159	September 26 (1)	Mets	4–3 (12)	**Gene Garber** (10–12)	Bob Apodaca (3–4)	None	see 2nd game	85–74
160	September 26 (2)	Mets	2–3 (12)	Jerry Koosman (14–13)	**Tug McGraw** (9–6)	Ken Sanders (5)	20,189	85–75
161	September 27	Mets	8–1	**Steve Carlton** (15–14)	Randy Tate (5–13)	None	27,615	86–75
162	September 28	Mets	4–5	Tom Seaver (22–9)	**Larry Christenson** (11–6)	Skip Lockwood (2)	21,105	86–76

^{^[a]}The August 4, 1975, game was protested by the Cubs in the top of the seventh inning. The protest was later denied.
^{^[b]}The September 8, 1975, game was protested by the Phillies in the bottom of the third inning. The protest was later denied.

=== Roster ===
1975 Philadelphia Phillies
**Roster**
**Pitchers**: 29,31 Cy Acosta; 32 Steve Carlton; 38 Larry Christenson; 26 Gene Garber; 35 Tom Hilgendorf; 43 Joe Hoerner; 47 Randy Lerch; 41 Jim Lonborg; 45 Tug McGraw; 24 John Montague; 40 Dick Ruthven; 37 Ron Schueler; 44 Wayne Simpson; 33 Wayne Twitchell; 34 Tom Underwood	**Catchers**: 8 Bob Boone; 5 Larry Cox; 6 Jim Essian; 11 Tim McCarver; 6 Johnny Oates; **Infielders**: 15 Dick Allen; 10 Larry Bowa; 30 Dave Cash; 17 Terry Harmon; 14 Tommy Hutton; 27 Willie Montañez; 20 Mike Schmidt; 12 Tony Taylor	**Outfielders**: 22 Mike Anderson; 16,15 Alan Bannister; 23 Ollie Brown; 25 Don Hahn; 21 Jay Johnstone; 19 Greg Luzinski; 29,31 Garry Maddox; 11 Jerry Martin; 28 Mike Rogodzinski; **Other batters**: 18,5 Ron Clark; 44 Larry Fritz	**Manager**: 3 Danny Ozark; **Coaches**: 1 Carroll Beringer; 2 Billy DeMars; 4 Ray Rippelmeyer; 7 Bobby Wine

== Player stats ==
= Indicates team leader

= Indicates league leader

=== Batting ===
==== Starters by position ====
Note: Pos = Position; G = Games played; AB = At bats; H = Hits; Avg. = Batting average; HR = Home runs; RBI = Runs batted in

Pos	Player	G	AB	H	Avg.	HR	RBI
C	Bob Boone	97	289	71	.246	2	20
1B	Dick Allen	119	416	97	.233	12	62
2B	Dave Cash	162	699	213	.305	4	57
SS	Larry Bowa	136	583	178	.305	2	38
3B	Mike Schmidt	158	562	140	.249	38	95
LF	Greg Luzinski	161	596	179	.300	34	120
CF	Garry Maddox	99	374	109	.291	4	46
RF	Jay Johnstone	122	350	115	.329	7	54

==== Other batters ====
Note: G = Games played; AB = At bats; H = Hits; Avg. = Batting average; HR = Home runs; RBI = Runs batted in

Player	G	AB	H	Avg.	HR	RBI
Johnny Oates	90	269	77	.286	1	25
Mike Anderson	115	247	64	.259	4	28
Tommy Hutton	113	165	41	.248	3	24
Ollie Brown	84	145	44	.303	6	26
Jerry Martin	57	113	24	.212	2	11
Tony Taylor	79	103	25	.243	1	17
Willie Montañez	21	84	24	.286	2	16
Terry Harmon	48	72	13	.181	0	5
Alan Bannister	24	61	16	.262	0	0
Tim McCarver	47	59	15	.254	1	7
Mike Rogodzinski	16	19	5	.263	0	4
Larry Cox	11	5	1	.200	0	1
Don Hahn	9	5	0	.000	0	0
Jim Essian	2	1	1	1.000	0	1
Larry Fritz	1	1	0	.000	0	0
Ron Clark	1	1	0	.000	0	0

=== Pitching ===
==== Starting pitchers ====
Note: G = Games pitched; IP = Innings pitched; W = Wins; L = Losses; ERA = Earned run average; SO = Strikeouts

Player	G	IP	W	L	ERA	SO
Steve Carlton	37	255.1	15	14	3.56	192
Tom Underwood	35	219.1	14	13	4.14	123
Larry Christenson	29	171.2	11	6	3.67	88
Jim Lonborg	27	159.1	8	6	4.12	72

==== Other pitchers ====
Note: G = Games pitched; IP = Innings pitched; W = Wins; L = Losses; ERA = Earned run average; SO = Strikeouts

Player	G	IP	W	L	ERA	SO
Wayne Twitchell	36	134.1	5	10	4.42	101
Dick Ruthven	11	40.2	2	2	4.20	26
Wayne Simpson	7	30.2	1	0	3.23	19

==== Relief pitchers ====
Note: G = Games pitched; W = Wins; L = Losses; SV = Saves; ERA = Earned run average; SO = Strikeouts

Player	G	W	L	SV	ERA	SO
Gene Garber	71	10	12	14	3.60	69
Tug McGraw	56	9	6	14	2.98	55
Tom Hilgendorf	53	7	3	0	2.14	52
Ron Schueler	46	4	4	0	5.24	69
Joe Hoerner	25	0	0	0	2.57	20
Cy Acosta	6	0	0	1	6.23	2
Randy Lerch	3	0	0	0	6.43	8
John Montague	3	0	0	0	9.00	1

== Farm system ==
Level	Team	League	Manager
AAA	Toledo Mud Hens	International League	Jim Bunning
AA	Reading Phillies	Eastern League	Bob Wellman
A	Rocky Mount Phillies	Carolina League	Cal Emery
A	Spartanburg Phillies	Western Carolinas League	Lee Elia
A-Short Season	Auburn Phillies	New York–Penn League	June Raines
Rookie	Pulaski Phillies	Appalachian League	Bob Wren

LEAGUE CHAMPIONS: Rocky Mount, Spartanburg
