= 1975 New York Mets season =

1975 New York Mets
- League: National League
- Division: East
- Ballpark: Shea Stadium
- City: New York
- Record: 82–80 (.506)
- Divisional place: 3rd
- Owners: Joan Whitney Payson
- General manager: Joe McDonald
- Managers: Yogi Berra, Roy McMillan
- Television: WOR-TV
- Radio: WNEW (Ralph Kiner, Lindsey Nelson, Bob Murphy)

The 1975 New York Mets season was the 14th regular season for the Mets, who played their home games at Shea Stadium. Initially led by manager Yogi Berra followed by Roy McMillan, the team had an 82–80 record and finished in third place in the National League East, ten and a half games behind the first place Pittsburgh Pirates.

== Offseason ==
- October 22, 1974: Duffy Dyer was traded by the Mets to the Pittsburgh Pirates for Gene Clines.
- December 3, 1974: Tug McGraw, Don Hahn, and Dave Schneck were traded by the Mets to the Philadelphia Phillies for Del Unser, Mac Scarce and John Stearns.
- January 9, 1975: Greg Harris was drafted by the Mets in the 4th round of the 1975 Major League Baseball draft (secondary phase), but did not sign.

== Regular season ==
=== Season summary ===
After the Mets' lackluster 1974 season, changes were made to improve the team. On February 28, the Mets scored a coup. For cash estimated at around $100,000, they acquired the San Francisco Giants' explosive home run hitter, Dave Kingman. A moody but undeniable talent, Kingman had batted just .223 for San Francisco in 1974, striking out every third at-bat, but many of his 18 home runs had traveled breathtaking distances. Kingman, the Mets hoped, would provide the home run power the club lacked, as well as generate some excitement.

The Mets were indeed stronger in 1975. Their .256 batting average was the highest in club history, and Kingman did supply some wallop with a then team-record 36 home runs, while Rusty Staub's 105 RBIs made him the first Met to drive in 100. As before, the club's greatest strength lay in its pitching, topped by Tom Seaver's 22–9 record, good enough for a third Cy Young Award. Jerry Koosman was 14–13 and Jon Matlack 16–12, but beyond that no pitcher won more than seven. At season's end, they concluded with an 82–80 record and a tie for third.

=== Firings and tragedies ===
The Mets' marginal 82–80 record also resulted in the dismissal of manager Yogi Berra on August 6. His replacement for the rest of the season was coach Roy McMillan. Also gone, a week earlier, was Cleon Jones, released outright.

As the season rolled to an end, there was a quick succession of news stories involving the Mets. On September 29, Casey Stengel died of cancer in California at the age of 85. A few days later, on October 4, the club's principal owner, Mrs. Joan Payson, died at the age of 72.

In between these two passings, on October 3 the club announced the hiring of their fifth full-time manager. The new man was Joe Frazier, former major league infielder and manager of the Tidewater Tides in 1975. Frazier was the first Mets skipper to not have played or managed for a New York team prior to managing the Mets, having been promoted from within the organization. Frazier had led the Tides, the Mets' top farm club, to a first-place finish in the International League, earning him the Sporting News award for Minor League Manager of the Year.

=== Season standings ===
NL East
Team	W	L	Pct.	GB	Home	Road
Pittsburgh Pirates	92	69	.571	—	52‍–‍28	40‍–‍41
Philadelphia Phillies	86	76	.531	6½	51‍–‍30	35‍–‍46
New York Mets	82	80	.506	10½	42‍–‍39	40‍–‍41
St. Louis Cardinals	82	80	.506	10½	45‍–‍36	37‍–‍44
Chicago Cubs	75	87	.463	17½	42‍–‍39	33‍–‍48
Montreal Expos	75	87	.463	17½	39‍–‍42	36‍–‍45

=== Record vs. opponents ===
1975 National League record Sources:
Team	ATL	CHC	CIN	HOU	LAD	MON	NYM	PHI	PIT	SD	SF	STL
Atlanta	—	5–7	3–15	12–6	8–10	8–4	4–8	5–7	4–8	7–11	8–9	3–9
Chicago	7–5	—	1–11	7–5	5–7	9–9	7–11	12–6	6–12	5–7	5–7	11–7
Cincinnati	15–3	11–1	—	13–5	8–10	8–4	8–4	7–5	6–6	11–7	13–5	8–4
Houston	6–12	5–7	5–13	—	6–12	8–4	4–8	6–6	6–5	9–9	5–13	4–8–1
Los Angeles	10–8	7–5	10–8	12–6	—	5–7	6–6	7–5	5–7	11–7	10–8	5–7
Montreal	4–8	9–9	4–8	4–8	7–5	—	10–8	7–11	7–11	7–5	5–7	11–7
New York	8–4	11–7	4–8	8–4	6–6	8–10	—	7–11	5–13	8–4	8–4	9–9
Philadelphia	7-5	6–12	5–7	6–6	5–7	11–7	11–7	—	11–7	7–5	7–5	10–8
Pittsburgh	8–4	12–6	6–6	5–6	7–5	11–7	13–5	7–11	—	8–4	5–7	10–8
San Diego	11–7	7–5	7–11	9–9	7–11	5–7	4–8	5–7	4–8	—	8–10	4–8
San Francisco	9–8	7–5	5–13	13–5	8–10	7–5	4–8	5–7	7–5	10–8	—	5–7
St. Louis	9–3	7–11	4–8	8–4–1	7–5	7–11	9–9	8–10	8–10	8–4	7–5	—

=== Notable transactions ===
- April 4, 1975: Joe Nolan was traded by the Mets to the Atlanta Braves for Leo Foster.
- April 12, 1975: Jesús Alou was signed as a free agent by the Mets.
- April 25, 1975: Bill Laxton was signed as a free agent by the Mets.

==== Draft picks ====
- June 3, 1975: Butch Benton was drafted by the Mets in the 1st round (6th pick) of the 1975 Major League Baseball draft.

=== Roster ===
1975 New York Mets
Roster
Pitchers: 34 Bob Apodaca; 45 Rick Baldwin; 38 Jerry Cram; 39 Nino Espinosa; 19 Tom Hall; 36 Jerry Koosman; 38 Skip Lockwood; 32 Jon Matlack; 31 Harry Parker; 33 Ken Sanders; 33 Mac Scarce; 41 Tom Seaver; 40 George Stone; 27 Craig Swan; 48 Randy Tate; 30 Hank Webb	Catchers: 15 Jerry Grote; 42 Ron Hodges; 16 John Stearns; Infielders: 11 Wayne Garrett; 3 Bud Harrelson; 12 Jack Heidemann; 7 Ed Kranepool; 17 Félix Millán; 5 Mike Phillips; 2 Roy Staiger; 9 Joe Torre	Outfielders: 23 Jesús Alou; 1 Gene Clines; 22 Bob Gallagher; 21 Cleon Jones; 26 Dave Kingman; 28 John Milner; 10 Rusty Staub; 25 Del Unser; 31 Mike Vail; Other batters: 2 Brock Pemberton	Manager: 8 Yogi Berra; 51 Roy McMillan; Coaches: 24 Willie Mays; 51 Roy McMillan; 52 Joe Pignatano; 54 Rube Walker; 53 Eddie Yost

== Player stats ==
= Indicates team leader

= Indicates league leader

=== Batting ===
==== Starters by position ====
Note: Pos = Position; G = Games played; AB = At bats; H = Hits; Avg. = Batting average; HR = Home runs; RBI = Runs batted in

Pos	Player	G	AB	H	Avg.	HR	RBI
C	Jerry Grote	119	386	114	.295	2	39
1B	Ed Kranepool	106	325	105	.323	4	43
2B	Félix Millán	162	676	191	.283	1	56
SS	Mike Phillips	116	383	98	.256	1	28
3B	Wayne Garrett	107	274	73	.266	6	34
LF	Dave Kingman	134	502	116	.231	36	88
CF	Del Unser	147	531	156	.294	10	53
RF	Rusty Staub	155	574	162	.282	19	105

==== Other batters ====
Note: G = Games played; AB = At bats; H = Hits; Avg. = Batting average; HR = Home runs; RBI = Runs batted in

Player	G	AB	H	Avg.	HR	RBI
Joe Torre	114	361	89	.247	6	35
John Milner	91	220	42	.191	7	29
Gene Clines	82	203	46	.227	0	10
John Stearns	59	169	32	.189	3	10
Mike Vail	38	162	49	.302	3	17
Jack Heidemann	61	145	31	.214	1	16
Jesús Alou	62	102	27	.265	0	11
Bud Harrelson	34	73	16	.219	0	3
Cleon Jones	21	50	12	.240	0	2
Ron Hodges	9	34	7	.206	2	4
Roy Staiger	13	19	3	.158	0	0
Bob Gallagher	33	15	2	.133	0	0
Brock Pemberton	2	2	0	.000	0	0

=== Pitching ===
= Indicates league leader

==== Starting pitchers ====
Note: G = Games pitched; IP = Innings pitched; W = Wins; L = Losses; ERA = Earned run average; SO = Strikeouts

Player	G	IP	W	L	ERA	SO
Tom Seaver	36	280.1	22	9	2.38	243
Jerry Koosman	36	239.2	14	13	3.42	173
Jon Matlack	33	228.2	16	12	3.38	154
Randy Tate	26	137.2	5	13	4.45	99
George Stone	13	57.0	3	3	5.05	21
Craig Swan	6	31.0	1	3	6.39	19

==== Other pitchers ====
Note: G = Games pitched; IP = Innings pitched; W = Wins; L = Losses; ERA = Earned run average; SO = Strikeouts

Player	G	IP	W	L	ERA	SO
Hank Webb	29	115.0	7	6	4.07	38

==== Relief pitchers ====
Note: G = Games pitched; W = Wins; L = Losses; SV = Saves; ERA = Earned run average; SO = Strikeouts

Player	G	W	L	SV	ERA	SO
Bob Apodaca	46	3	4	13	1.49	45
Rick Baldwin	54	3	5	6	3.33	54
Tom Hall	34	4	3	1	4.75	48
Ken Sanders	30	1	1	5	2.30	8
Skip Lockwood	24	1	3	2	1.49	61
Harry Parker	18	2	3	2	4.41	22
Jerry Cram	4	0	1	0	5.40	2
Nino Espinosa	2	0	1	0	18.00	2
Mac Scarce	1	0	0	0	----	0

== Awards and honors ==
- Dave Kingman – Player of the Month, July 1975

All-Star Game

== Farm system ==
Level	Team	League	Manager
AAA	Tidewater Tides	International League	Joe Frazier
AA	Jackson Mets	Texas League	John Antonelli
A	Visalia Mets	California League	Jack Aker
A	Wausau Mets	Midwest League	Owen Friend
Rookie	Marion Mets	Appalachian League	Chuck Hiller and Billy Connors

LEAGUE CHAMPIONS: Tidewater
