= Larry Fritz =

American baseball player (1949–2010)

- Born: February 14, 1949; Whiting, Indiana, US
- Died: July 22, 2010 (aged 61); Munster, Indiana, US
- Batted: Left Threw: Left

MLB debut
- May 30, 1975, for the Philadelphia Phillies

Last MLB appearance
- May 30, 1975, for the Philadelphia Phillies

MLB statistics
- Games: 1
- At bats: 1
- Hits: 0
- Stats at Baseball Reference

Teams
- Philadelphia Phillies (1975)

Laurence Joseph Fritz (February 14, 1949 – July 22, 2010), nicknamed "Zeb", was an American professional baseball first baseman, who played in Major League Baseball (MLB) for the Philadelphia Phillies, as a pinch hitter. He appeared in only one big league game, during the 1975 season. Listed at 6 ft 2 in (1.88 m), 225 lb., Fritz batted and threw left-handed.

A native of Whiting, Indiana, Fritz attended Whiting High School and Arizona State University.

Fritz was selected by the New York Mets in the third round (57th overall) of the 1969 Major League Baseball draft, playing in their Minor League Baseball (MiLB) system for the Marion Mets (1969, 1971–72), Visalia Mets (1970, 1972), Memphis Blues (1972), and Tidewater Tides (1972–73), before joining the Phillies organization in 1974.

Fritz began the 1974 season with Double-A Reading Phillies, for whom he hit eight home runs, with 19 runs batted in (RBI), in 15 games. During the midseason, he gained a promotion to Triple-A Toledo Mud Hens, where he batted three homers and drove in seven runs in 16 games.

In 1975, Fritz was purchased by Philadelphia from Toledo after Phillies shortstop Larry Bowa broke his hand in a game against the San Francisco Giants on May 27.

Fritz made his lone MLB appearance on May 30, 1975, at Veterans Stadium against the Houston Astros. With the Phillies trailing 5 to 0, and with two-outs and Mike Anderson on first in the bottom of the ninth-inning, Fritz pinch-hit for Larry Christenson. Facing Astros pitcher Doug Konieczny, Fritz flew out to left-field to end the game.

On June 6, 1975, Mud Hens first baseman Andy Kosco broke his wrist. The Phillies returned Fritz to Toledo and in his place recalled outfielder Mike Rogodzinski from Reading.

In a seven-year minor league career, Fritz batted .273, with 117 home runs, and 235 RBI, in 635 games, including a .356 on-base percentage and a .498 slugging percentage.

Following his baseball career, Fritz went on to play softball for numerous Indiana teams. He also served in the Indiana National Guard, Company C 113th Engineer Battalion, and worked as a truck driver until his retirement in 2004 from Metro Intermodal due to a disability.

Fritz died in Munster, Indiana, at the age of 61.

== See also ==
- 1975 Philadelphia Phillies season
- Cup of coffee
