= Roger Freed =

American baseball player (1946–1996)

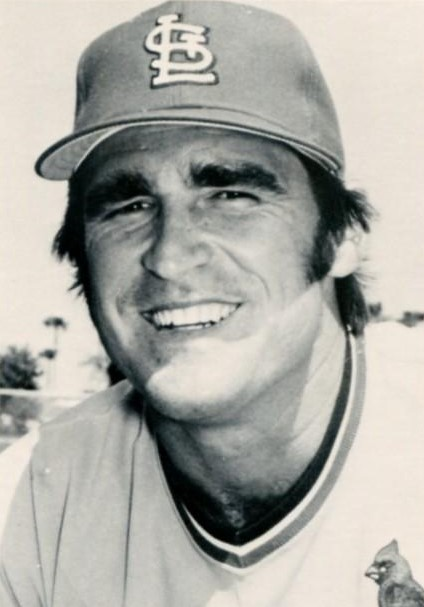
- Right fielder
- Born: June 2, 1946; Los Angeles, California, U.S.
- Died: January 9, 1996 (aged 49); Chino, California, U.S.
- Batted: Right Threw: Right

MLB debut
- September 18, 1970, for the Baltimore Orioles

Last MLB appearance
- September 28, 1979, for the St. Louis Cardinals

MLB statistics
- Batting average: .245
- Home runs: 22
- Runs batted in: 109
- Stats at Baseball Reference

Teams
- Baltimore Orioles (1970); Philadelphia Phillies (1971–1972); Cincinnati Reds (1974); Montreal Expos (1976); St. Louis Cardinals (1977–1979)

Roger Vernon Freed (June 2, 1946 – January 9, 1996), was an American professional baseball outfielder, who played in Major League Baseball (MLB) for the Baltimore Orioles, Philadelphia Phillies, Cincinnati Reds, Montreal Expos, and St. Louis Cardinals, from 1970 to 1979.

== Early life ==
Freed was one of four children of William and Margie Freed. He was a four-sport athlete at Baldwin Park High School in Baldwin Park, California, and attended Mt. San Antonio College in Walnut, California.

== Playing career ==
=== Orioles ===
Freed was originally signed by the Baltimore Orioles in 1966 and played in their farm system for five seasons. In 1970, he was voted the International League Most Valuable Player while playing for the Rochester Red Wings. His first major league call-up was in September and he made his playing debut on September 18, 1970, starting in right field and batting cleanup, going 0-for-4 in a 5-4 Orioles' loss to the Cleveland Indians. His first hit came two days later, a single off the Indians' Phil Hennigan. He went 2-for-13 in four games with one RBI. Freed was traded from the Orioles to the Phillies for Grant Jackson, Jim Hutto and Sam Parrilla on December 15, 1970. He was a top prospect whose chances of dislodging Frank Robinson, Paul Blair, Don Buford or Merv Rettenmund from the Orioles outfield roster were becoming more unlikely.

=== Phillies ===
In 1971, the Phillies installed Freed as their regular right fielder. Over the course of the season, however, he slowly saw less and less playing time, and he wound up playing 100 games that season, batting .221. That would be the closest Freed ever came to being a major league regular.

Freed spent 1972 coming off the bench as a pinch hitter. Freed did appear in more games in right field for the Phillies than anyone else, but his total was only 45 games as the Phillies rotated Tommy Hutton, Mike Anderson, Oscar Gamble and Bill Robinson through the position as well. Both Freed and Gamble were shipped off to the Cleveland Indians for Del Unser and minor league third baseman Terry Wedgewood on December 1, 1972.

=== Back in the minors ===
Freed never played a game for the Indians, spending all of 1973 in the minors. He was then traded to the Cincinnati Reds for Steve Blateric. He played in six games for the Reds in 1974, and then had his contract sold to the Sultanes de Monterrey in the Mexican League.

He played in Mexico for all of 1975, but resurfaced with the Montreal Expos in 1976. Playing for the Denver Bears, he received his second minor league MVP award, this time in the American Association. Once again, a minor league MVP would earn Freed a September call-up, and Freed appeared in eight games in September for the Expos, going 3-for-15. At the end of the season, he was once again sent back to the minors, but in December he was rescued by the St. Louis Cardinals, who selected him in the rule 5 draft.

=== Cardinals ===
==== .400 (almost) ====
1977 proved to be a special year for Freed. Although he played in only 49 games, Freed became a popular player in St. Louis as he came through with a series of clutch pinch hits, and as the end of the season drew near he was in the rarified air of a batting average over .400.

On the last day of the season, his average was .402, and he could have sat on the bench that last day and kept his average above the magical mark. However, the Cardinals were down 6–3 against the New York Mets going into the 9th, and had put a rally together. A double by Mike Tyson, a walk by Mike Anderson, and a single by Mike Phillips had brought the Cardinals to within 6–4 with one out. The Mets removed pitcher Paul Siebert and replaced him with Rick Baldwin, and Baldwin was able to get Mike Potter to fly out. The Cardinals' pitcher, Al Hrabosky was due up, and Freed was called upon to pinch hit. Unfortunately, Freed grounded into a force play, and ended both the game and his chance at .400, winding up with an average of .398.

In Strat-O-Matic baseball, Roger Freed's 1977 card is often used to play "stratball", or to use a player with great stats but a small sample size to improve one's lineup dramatically.

==== Remaining career ====
Freed spent two more seasons with the Cardinals. In 1978, he had 20 RBI's in just 92 at-bats, but his batting average had sunk to .239. Freed had another disappointing season in 1979, although he did have one memorable moment, hitting a two-out, game-ending grand slam homer in the bottom of the 11th inning to beat the Houston Astros 7–6 on May 1, 1979.

Freed was released during spring training in 1980. He was signed to a minor league contract by the Phillies, but he never played in the major leagues again.

== Death ==
Freed died of heart problems at age 49 on January 9, 1996, in Chino, California. He had been hospitalized since December 18 with a ruptured appendix. Survived by wife Linda Freed and three daughters Mindy, Merrie, and Michelle.

== See also ==
- List of Major League Baseball ultimate grand slams
