= 1975 Montreal Expos season =

1975 Montreal Expos
- League: National League
- Division: East
- Ballpark: Jarry Park
- City: Montreal
- Record: 75–87 (.463)
- Divisional place: tied 5th
- Owners: Charles Bronfman
- General managers: Jim Fanning
- Managers: Gene Mauch
- Television: CBC Television (Dave Van Horne, Duke Snider); Télévision de Radio-Canada (Jean-Pierre Roy, Guy Ferron)
- Radio: CFCF (English) (Dave Van Horne, Russ Taylor, Duke Snider, Tom Cheek, Ron Reusch); CKAC (French) (Claude Raymond, Jacques Doucet)

The 1975 Montreal Expos season was the seventh season in the history of the franchise. The Expos finished in last place in the National League East with a record of 75–87, 17½ games behind the Pittsburgh Pirates.

== Offseason ==
- December 4, 1974: Tom Walker and Terry Humphrey were traded to the Detroit Tigers for Woodie Fryman.
- December 4, 1974: Mike Torrez and Ken Singleton were traded to the Baltimore Orioles for Dave McNally, Rich Coggins, and Bill Kirkpatrick (minors).
- December 5, 1974: Willie Davis was traded to the Texas Rangers for Don Stanhouse and Pete Mackanin.

== Spring training ==
The Expos held spring training at City Island Ball Park in Daytona Beach, Florida, their third season there.

== Regular season ==
=== Season standings ===
NL East
Team	W	L	Pct.	GB	Home	Road
Pittsburgh Pirates	92	69	.571	—	52‍–‍28	40‍–‍41
Philadelphia Phillies	86	76	.531	6½	51‍–‍30	35‍–‍46
New York Mets	82	80	.506	10½	42‍–‍39	40‍–‍41
St. Louis Cardinals	82	80	.506	10½	45‍–‍36	37‍–‍44
Chicago Cubs	75	87	.463	17½	42‍–‍39	33‍–‍48
Montreal Expos	75	87	.463	17½	39‍–‍42	36‍–‍45

=== Record vs. opponents ===
1975 National League record Sources:
Team	ATL	CHC	CIN	HOU	LAD	MON	NYM	PHI	PIT	SD	SF	STL
Atlanta	—	5–7	3–15	12–6	8–10	8–4	4–8	5–7	4–8	7–11	8–9	3–9
Chicago	7–5	—	1–11	7–5	5–7	9–9	7–11	12–6	6–12	5–7	5–7	11–7
Cincinnati	15–3	11–1	—	13–5	8–10	8–4	8–4	7–5	6–6	11–7	13–5	8–4
Houston	6–12	5–7	5–13	—	6–12	8–4	4–8	6–6	6–5	9–9	5–13	4–8–1
Los Angeles	10–8	7–5	10–8	12–6	—	5–7	6–6	7–5	5–7	11–7	10–8	5–7
Montreal	4–8	9–9	4–8	4–8	7–5	—	10–8	7–11	7–11	7–5	5–7	11–7
New York	8–4	11–7	4–8	8–4	6–6	8–10	—	7–11	5–13	8–4	8–4	9–9
Philadelphia	7-5	6–12	5–7	6–6	5–7	11–7	11–7	—	11–7	7–5	7–5	10–8
Pittsburgh	8–4	12–6	6–6	5–6	7–5	11–7	13–5	7–11	—	8–4	5–7	10–8
San Diego	11–7	7–5	7–11	9–9	7–11	5–7	4–8	5–7	4–8	—	8–10	4–8
San Francisco	9–8	7–5	5–13	13–5	8–10	7–5	4–8	5–7	7–5	10–8	—	5–7
St. Louis	9–3	7–11	4–8	8–4–1	7–5	7–11	9–9	8–10	8–10	8–4	7–5	—

=== Notable transactions ===
- April 30: Tim Ireland was released by the Expos.
- June 3: 1975 Major League Baseball draft
  - Mike Boddicker was selected in the 8th round, but did not sign.
  - Andre Dawson was selected in the 11th round.
- June 15: Nate Colbert was purchased from the Detroit Tigers.

=== Roster ===
1975 Montreal Expos
Roster
Pitchers: 28 Dennis Blair; 40 Don Carrithers; 25 Don DeMola; 35 Woodie Fryman; 33 Chip Lang; 26,20 Dave McNally; 53 John Montague; 27 Dale Murray; 18 Steve Renko; 45 Steve Rogers; 44,21 Fred Scherman; 26 Don Stanhouse; 36 Chuck Taylor; 39 Dan Warthen	Catchers: 9 Barry Foote; 53 Larry Johnson; Infielders: 23 Hal Breeden; 24 Nate Colbert; 10 Jim Cox; 19 Tim Foli; 38 Pepe Frías; 16 Mike Jorgensen; 12 Larry Lintz; 5 Pete Mackanin; 34 José Morales; 50,15 Larry Parrish; 42 Pat Scanlon	Outfielders: 3 Bob Bailey; 17 Larry Biittner; 8 Gary Carter; 2 Rich Coggins; 43 Jim Dwyer; 20 Jim Lyttle; 11 Pepe Mangual; 44 Bombo Rivera; 52,30 Tony Scott; 54,22,17 Ellis Valentine; 37 Jerry White	Manager: 4 Gene Mauch; Coaches: 1 Dave Bristol (Third Base); 46 Walt Hriniak (First Base); 32 Cal McLish (Pitching); 31 Jerry Zimmerman (Bullpen)

== Player stats ==
= Indicates team leader among qualifying players

=== Batting ===
==== Starters by position ====
Note: Pos = Position; G = Games played; AB = At bats; R = Runs scored; H = Hits; Avg. = Batting average; HR = Home runs; RBI = Runs batted in; SB = Stolen bases

Pos	Player	G	AB	R	H	Avg.	HR	RBI	SB
C	Barry Foote	118	387	25	75	.194	7	30	0
1B	Mike Jorgensen	144	445	58	116	.261	18	67	3
2B	Pete Mackanin	130	448	59	101	.225	12	44	11
3B	Larry Parrish	145	532	50	146	.274	10	65	4
SS	Tim Foli	152	572	64	136	.238	1	29	13
LF	Bob Bailey	106	227	23	62	.273	5	30	4
CF	Pepe Mangual	140	514	84	126	.245	9	45	33
RF	Gary Carter	144	503	58	136	.270	17	68	5

==== Other batters ====
Note: G = Games played; AB = At bats; R = Runs scored; H = Hits; Avg. = Batting average; HR = Home runs; RBI = Runs batted in; SB = Stolen bases

Player	G	AB	R	H	Avg.	HR	RBI	SB
Larry Biittner	121	346	34	109	.315	3	28	2
Jim Dwyer	60	175	22	50	.286	3	20	4
José Morales	93	163	18	49	.301	2	24	0
Tony Scott	92	143	19	26	.182	0	11	5
Larry Lintz	46	132	18	26	.197	0	3	17
Pat Scanlon	60	109	5	20	.183	2	15	0
Jerry White	39	97	14	29	.299	2	7	5
Nate Colbert	38	81	10	14	.173	4	11	0
Pepe Frías	51	64	4	8	.125	0	4	0
Jim Lyttle	44	55	7	15	.273	0	6	0
Hal Breeden	24	37	4	5	.135	0	1	0
Rich Coggins	13	37	1	10	.270	0	4	0
Ellis Valentine	12	33	2	12	.364	1	3	0
Jim Cox	11	27	1	7	.259	1	5	1
Bombo Rivera	5	9	1	1	.111	0	0	0
Larry Johnson	1	3	0	1	.333	0	1	0

=== Pitching ===
==== Starting pitchers ====
Note: G = Games pitched; IP = Innings pitched; W = Wins; L = Losses; ERA = Earned run average; SO = Strikeouts

Player	G	IP	W	L	ERA	SO
Steve Rogers	35	251.2	11	12	3.29	137
Steve Renko	31	170.1	6	12	4.07	99
Dennis Blair	30	163.1	8	15	3.80	82
Don Carrithers	19	101.0	5	3	3.30	37
Dave McNally	12	77.1	3	6	5.24	36
Don Stanhouse	4	13.0	0	0	8.31	5
Chip Lang	1	1.2	0	0	10.80	2

==== Other pitchers ====
Note: G = Games pitched; IP = Innings pitched; W = Wins; L = Losses; ERA = Earned run average; SO = Strikeouts

Player	G	IP	W	L	ERA	SO
Dan Warthen	40	167.2	8	6	3.11	128
Woodie Fryman	38	157.0	9	12	3.32	118
Fred Scherman	34	76.1	4	3	3.54	43

==== Relief pitchers ====
Note: G = Games pitched; W = Wins; L = Losses; SV = Saves; ERA = Earned run average; SO = Strikeouts

Player	G	W	L	SV	ERA	SO
Dale Murray	63	15	8	9	3.96	43
Don DeMola	60	4	7	1	4.15	63
Chuck Taylor	54	2	2	6	3.53	29
John Montague	12	0	1	2	5.60	9

== Award winners ==
1975 Major League Baseball All-Star Game

- Gary Carter, catcher, reserve

== Farm system ==
Level	Team	League	Manager
AAA	Memphis Blues	International League	Karl Kuehl
AA	Québec Carnavals	Eastern League	Lance Nichols
A	West Palm Beach Expos	Florida State League	Gordon Mackenzie
Rookie	Lethbridge Expos	Pioneer League	Van Kelly
