= 1975 St. Louis Cardinals season =

Major League Baseball season

1975 St. Louis Cardinals
- League: National League
- Division: East
- Ballpark: Busch Memorial Stadium
- City: St. Louis, Missouri
- Record: 82–80 (.506)
- Divisional place: 3rd
- Owners: August "Gussie" Busch
- General managers: Bing Devine
- Managers: Red Schoendienst
- Television: KSD-TV (Jack Buck, Mike Shannon, Jay Randolph)
- Radio: KMOX (Jack Buck, Mike Shannon)

The 1975 St. Louis Cardinals season was the team's 94th season in St. Louis, Missouri and its 84th season in the National League. The Cardinals went 82–80 during the season and finished in a tie for third (with the New York Mets) in the National League East, 10 1/2 games behind the Pittsburgh Pirates.

== Offseason ==
- October 14, 1974: Marc Hill was traded by the Cardinals to the San Francisco Giants for Ken Rudolph and Elías Sosa.
- November 18, 1974: Alan Foster, Rich Folkers and Sonny Siebert were traded by the Cardinals to the San Diego Padres as part of a three team trade. The Padres sent a player to be named later to the Cardinals, and the Detroit Tigers sent Ed Brinkman to the Cardinals. The Tigers sent Bob Strampe and Dick Sharon to the Padres. The Padres sent Nate Colbert to the Tigers. The Padres completed the deal by sending Danny Breeden to the Cardinals on December 12.
- March 26, 1975: Ron Hunt was released by the Cardinals.
- March 29, 1975: Danny Godby was traded by the Cardinals to the Boston Red Sox for Danny Cater.

== Regular season ==
Third baseman Ken Reitz won a Gold Glove this year. 1975 was also the final major league season for pitcher Bob Gibson.

=== Season standings ===
NL East
Team	W	L	Pct.	GB	Home	Road
Pittsburgh Pirates	92	69	.571	—	52‍–‍28	40‍–‍41
Philadelphia Phillies	86	76	.531	6½	51‍–‍30	35‍–‍46
New York Mets	82	80	.506	10½	42‍–‍39	40‍–‍41
St. Louis Cardinals	82	80	.506	10½	45‍–‍36	37‍–‍44
Chicago Cubs	75	87	.463	17½	42‍–‍39	33‍–‍48
Montreal Expos	75	87	.463	17½	39‍–‍42	36‍–‍45

=== Record vs. opponents ===
1975 National League record Sources:
Team	ATL	CHC	CIN	HOU	LAD	MON	NYM	PHI	PIT	SD	SF	STL
Atlanta	—	5–7	3–15	12–6	8–10	8–4	4–8	5–7	4–8	7–11	8–9	3–9
Chicago	7–5	—	1–11	7–5	5–7	9–9	7–11	12–6	6–12	5–7	5–7	11–7
Cincinnati	15–3	11–1	—	13–5	8–10	8–4	8–4	7–5	6–6	11–7	13–5	8–4
Houston	6–12	5–7	5–13	—	6–12	8–4	4–8	6–6	6–5	9–9	5–13	4–8–1
Los Angeles	10–8	7–5	10–8	12–6	—	5–7	6–6	7–5	5–7	11–7	10–8	5–7
Montreal	4–8	9–9	4–8	4–8	7–5	—	10–8	7–11	7–11	7–5	5–7	11–7
New York	8–4	11–7	4–8	8–4	6–6	8–10	—	7–11	5–13	8–4	8–4	9–9
Philadelphia	7-5	6–12	5–7	6–6	5–7	11–7	11–7	—	11–7	7–5	7–5	10–8
Pittsburgh	8–4	12–6	6–6	5–6	7–5	11–7	13–5	7–11	—	8–4	5–7	10–8
San Diego	11–7	7–5	7–11	9–9	7–11	5–7	4–8	5–7	4–8	—	8–10	4–8
San Francisco	9–8	7–5	5–13	13–5	8–10	7–5	4–8	5–7	7–5	10–8	—	5–7
St. Louis	9–3	7–11	4–8	8–4–1	7–5	7–11	9–9	8–10	8–10	8–4	7–5	—

=== Opening Day starters ===
- Ed Brinkman
- Lou Brock
- Bob Gibson
- Keith Hernandez
- Bake McBride
- Ken Reitz
- Ted Simmons
- Ted Sizemore
- Reggie Smith

=== Notable transactions ===
- May 28, 1975: Elías Sosa and Ray Sadecki were traded by the Cardinals to the Atlanta Braves for Ron Reed and a player to be named later. The Braves completed the deal by sending Wayne Nordhagen to the Cardinals on June 2.
- June 3, 1975: Jim Lentine was drafted by the Cardinals in the 12th round of the 1975 Major League Baseball draft.
- June 4, 1975: Ed Brinkman and Tommy Moore were traded by the Cardinals to the Texas Rangers for Willie Davis.
- July 22, 1975: Ken Crosby was traded by the Cardinals to the Chicago Cubs for Eddie Solomon.

=== Roster ===
1975 St. Louis Cardinals
Roster
Pitchers: 24,27 Mike Barlow; 32 Ron Bryant; 22 John Curtis; 36 John Denny; 31 Bob Forsch; 43 Mike Garman; 45 Bob Gibson; 39 Al Hrabosky; 40 Ryan Kurosaki; 47 Lynn McGlothen; 27 Tommy Moore; 34 Harry Parker; 42 Eric Rasmussen; 38 Ron Reed; 24 Ken Reynolds; 37 Ray Sadecki; 38 Elías Sosa; 35 Greg Terlecky; 32 Mike Wallace	Catchers: 9 Ken Rudolph; 23 Ted Simmons; Infielders: 5 Ed Brinkman; 24 Danny Cater; 11 Héctor Cruz; 15 Ron Fairly; 19 Mario Guerrero; 18 Keith Hernandez; 37 Doug Howard; 28 Mick Kelleher; 25 Larry Lintz; 44 Ken Reitz; 41 Ted Sizemore; 10 Mike Tyson	Outfielders: 12 Buddy Bradford; 20 Lou Brock; 5 Willie Davis; 25 Jim Dwyer; 29 Don Hahn; 19 Ted Martínez; 21 Bake McBride; 26 Luis Meléndez; 29 Jerry Mumphrey; 7 Reggie Smith; Other batters: 16 Dick Billings	Manager: 2 Red Schoendienst; Coaches: 8 Vern Benson; 3 George Kissell; 30 Johnny Lewis; 14 Dave Ricketts; 33 Barney Schultz

== Player stats ==
=== Batting ===
==== Starters by position ====
Note: Pos = Position; G = Games played; AB = At bats; H = Hits; Avg. = Batting average; HR = Home runs; RBI = Runs batted in

Pos	Player	G	AB	H	Avg.	HR	RBI
C	Ted Simmons	157	581	193	.332	18	100
1B	Keith Hernandez	64	188	47	.250	3	20
2B	Ted Sizemore	153	562	135	.240	3	49
SS	Mike Tyson	122	368	98	.266	2	37
3B	Ken Reitz	161	592	159	.269	5	63
LF	Lou Brock	136	528	163	.309	3	47
CF	Bake McBride	116	413	124	.300	5	36
RF	Reggie Smith	135	477	144	.302	19	76

==== Other batters ====
Note: G = Games played; AB = At bats; H = Hits; Avg. = Batting average; HR = Home runs; RBI = Runs batted in

Player	G	AB	H	Avg.	HR	RBI
Willie Davis	98	350	102	.291	6	50
Luis Meléndez	110	291	77	.265	2	27
Ron Fairly	107	229	69	.301	7	37
Mario Guerrero	64	184	44	.239	0	11
Buddy Bradford	50	81	22	.272	4	15
Ken Rudolph	44	80	16	.200	1	6
Ed Brinkman	28	75	18	.240	1	6
Héctor Cruz	23	48	7	.146	0	6
Danny Cater	22	35	8	.229	0	2
Jim Dwyer	21	31	6	.194	0	1
Doug Howard	17	29	6	.207	1	1
Ted Martínez	16	21	4	.190	0	2
Larry Lintz	27	18	5	.278	0	1
Jerry Mumphrey	11	16	6	.375	0	1
Don Hahn	7	8	1	.125	0	0
Mick Kelleher	7	4	0	.000	0	0
Dick Billings	3	3	0	.000	0	0

=== Pitching ===
==== Starting pitchers ====
Note: G = Games pitched; IP = Innings pitched; W = Wins; L = Losses; ERA = Earned run average; SO = Strikeouts

Player	G	IP	W	L	ERA	SO
Lynn McGlothen	35	239.0	15	13	3.92	146
Bob Forsch	34	230.0	15	10	2.86	108
Ron Reed	24	175.2	9	8	3.23	99
John Denny	25	136.0	10	7	3.97	72
Bob Gibson	22	109.0	3	10	5.04	60
Eric Rasmussen	14	81.0	5	5	3.78	59

==== Other pitchers ====
Note: G = Games pitched; IP = Innings pitched; W = Wins; L = Losses; ERA = Earned run average; SO = Strikeouts

Player	G	IP	W	L	ERA	SO
John Curtis	39	146.2	8	9	3.44	67

==== Relief pitchers ====
Note: G = Games pitched; W = Wins; L = Losses; SV = Saves; ERA = Earned run average; SO = Strikeouts

Player	G	W	L	SV	ERA	SO
Al Hrabosky	65	13	3	22	1.66	82
Mike Garman	66	3	8	10	2.39	48
Greg Terlecky	20	0	1	0	4.45	13
Elías Sosa	14	0	3	0	4.00	15
Harry Parker	14	0	1	1	6.27	13
Tommy Moore	10	0	0	0	3.86	6
Ken Reynolds	10	0	1	0	1.59	7
Ron Bryant	10	0	1	0	16.62	7
Mike Wallace	9	0	0	0	2.08	6
Mike Barlow	9	0	0	0	4.70	2
Ray Sadecki	8	1	0	0	3.27	8
Ryan Kurosaki	7	0	0	0	7.62	6

== Awards and honors ==
- Lou Brock, Roberto Clemente Award

== Farm system ==
Level	Team	League	Manager
AAA	Tulsa Oilers	American Association	Ken Boyer
AA	Arkansas Travelers	Texas League	Roy Majtyka
A	St. Petersburg Cardinals	Florida State League	Jack Krol
Rookie	Johnson City Cardinals	Appalachian League	Tom Burgess
Rookie	GCL Cardinals	Gulf Coast League	Fred Koenig

LEAGUE CHAMPIONS: St. Petersburg, Johnson City
