= 1975 Pittsburgh Pirates season =

1975 Pittsburgh Pirates
- National League East champions
- League: National League
- Division: East
- Ballpark: Three Rivers Stadium
- City: Pittsburgh, Pennsylvania
- Record: 92–69 (.571)
- Divisional place: 1st
- Owners: John W. Galbreath (majority shareholder); Bing Crosby, Thomas P. Johnson (minority shareholders)
- General managers: Joe L. Brown
- Managers: Danny Murtaugh
- Television: KDKA-TV; Bob Prince, Nellie King
- Radio: KDKA; Bob Prince, Nellie King

The 1975 Pittsburgh Pirates season was the 94th in the history of the franchise and their 89th in the National League. The Pirates' 92–69 record was good enough to win their fifth National League East title in six seasons by 6 1/2 games over their cross-state rivals, the Philadelphia Phillies. The Pirates, however, lost the NLCS to the Cincinnati Reds, three games to none.

== Offseason ==
- October 22, 1974: Gene Clines was traded by the Pirates to the New York Mets for Duffy Dyer.
- January 6, 1975: Nelson Norman was signed as an amateur free agent by the Pirates.
- February 20, 1975: Albert Williams was signed as an amateur free agent by the Pirates.

== Regular season ==
- September 16, 1975: Rennie Stennett goes 7-for-7 against the Chicago Cubs at Wrigley Field in a 22–0 rout. He is the only MLB player in the 20th century to go 7-for-7 in a 9-inning game.

=== Season standings ===
NL East
| Team | W | L | Pct. | GB | Home | Road |
|---|---|---|---|---|---|---|
| Pittsburgh Pirates | 92 | 69 | .571 | — | 52‍–‍28 | 40‍–‍41 |
| Philadelphia Phillies | 86 | 76 | .531 | 6½ | 51‍–‍30 | 35‍–‍46 |
| New York Mets | 82 | 80 | .506 | 10½ | 42‍–‍39 | 40‍–‍41 |
| St. Louis Cardinals | 82 | 80 | .506 | 10½ | 45‍–‍36 | 37‍–‍44 |
| Chicago Cubs | 75 | 87 | .463 | 17½ | 42‍–‍39 | 33‍–‍48 |
| Montreal Expos | 75 | 87 | .463 | 17½ | 39‍–‍42 | 36‍–‍45 |

=== Record vs. opponents ===
1975 National League record Sources:
| Team | ATL | CHC | CIN | HOU | LAD | MON | NYM | PHI | PIT | SD | SF | STL |
|---|---|---|---|---|---|---|---|---|---|---|---|---|
| Atlanta | — | 5–7 | 3–15 | 12–6 | 8–10 | 8–4 | 4–8 | 5–7 | 4–8 | 7–11 | 8–9 | 3–9 |
| Chicago | 7–5 | — | 1–11 | 7–5 | 5–7 | 9–9 | 7–11 | 12–6 | 6–12 | 5–7 | 5–7 | 11–7 |
| Cincinnati | 15–3 | 11–1 | — | 13–5 | 8–10 | 8–4 | 8–4 | 7–5 | 6–6 | 11–7 | 13–5 | 8–4 |
| Houston | 6–12 | 5–7 | 5–13 | — | 6–12 | 8–4 | 4–8 | 6–6 | 6–5 | 9–9 | 5–13 | 4–8–1 |
| Los Angeles | 10–8 | 7–5 | 10–8 | 12–6 | — | 5–7 | 6–6 | 7–5 | 5–7 | 11–7 | 10–8 | 5–7 |
| Montreal | 4–8 | 9–9 | 4–8 | 4–8 | 7–5 | — | 10–8 | 7–11 | 7–11 | 7–5 | 5–7 | 11–7 |
| New York | 8–4 | 11–7 | 4–8 | 8–4 | 6–6 | 8–10 | — | 7–11 | 5–13 | 8–4 | 8–4 | 9–9 |
| Philadelphia | 7-5 | 6–12 | 5–7 | 6–6 | 5–7 | 11–7 | 11–7 | — | 11–7 | 7–5 | 7–5 | 10–8 |
| Pittsburgh | 8–4 | 12–6 | 6–6 | 5–6 | 7–5 | 11–7 | 13–5 | 7–11 | — | 8–4 | 5–7 | 10–8 |
| San Diego | 11–7 | 7–5 | 7–11 | 9–9 | 7–11 | 5–7 | 4–8 | 5–7 | 4–8 | — | 8–10 | 4–8 |
| San Francisco | 9–8 | 7–5 | 5–13 | 13–5 | 8–10 | 7–5 | 4–8 | 5–7 | 7–5 | 10–8 | — | 5–7 |
| St. Louis | 9–3 | 7–11 | 4–8 | 8–4–1 | 7–5 | 7–11 | 9–9 | 8–10 | 8–10 | 8–4 | 7–5 | — |

=== Game log ===
1975 Game Log: 92–69 (Home: 52–28; Away: 40–41)
April: 9–7 (Home: 6–4; Away: 3–3)

| # | Date | Opponent | Score | Win | Loss | Save | Attendance | Record |
|---|---|---|---|---|---|---|---|---|
| 1 | April 10 | @ Cubs | 8–4 | **Giusti** (1–0) | Frailing | — | 19,239 | 1–0 |
| 2 | April 11 | Mets | 4–3 | **Demery** (1–0) | Baldwin | — | 43,880 | 2–0 |
| 3 | April 13 | Mets | 5–3 | **Kison** (1–0) | Seaver | — | 14,841 | 3–0 |
| 4 | April 14 | Cubs | 2–4 | Reuschel | **Moose** (0–1) | Knowles | 4,780 | 3–1 |
| 5 | April 16 | Expos | 0–5 | Fryman | **Ellis** (0–1) | — | 4,807 | 3–2 |
| 6 | April 17 | Expos | 4–7 | McNally | **Reuss** (0–1) | — | 5,667 | 3–3 |
| 7 | April 18 | @ Cardinals | 4–5 (13) | Sadecki | **McDowell** (0–1) | — | 19,975 | 3–4 |
| 8 | April 19 | @ Cardinals | 7–1 | **Rooker** (1–0) | Forsch | — | 19,775 | 4–4 |
| 9 | April 20 | @ Cardinals | 5–0 | **Brett** (1–0) | Denny | **Giusti** (1) | 20,935 | 5–4 |
| 10 | April 22 | @ Expos | 3–4 | McNally | **Ellis** (0–2) | Murray | 5,239 | 5–5 |
| 11 | April 23 | @ Expos | 0–5 | Fryman | **Reuss** (0–2) | — | 8,177 | 5–6 |
| 12 | April 25 | Phillies | 3–2 | **Kison** (2–0) | Carlton | **Giusti** (2) | 5,726 | 6–6 |
| 13 | April 26 | Phillies | 7–3 | **Rooker** (2–0) | Twitchell | — | 13,120 | 7–6 |
| 14 | April 27 | Phillies | 2–0 | **Ellis** (1–2) | Underwood | — | 14,074 | 8–6 |
| 15 | April 29 | Cardinals | 0–3 | McGlothen | **Brett** (1–1) | — | 6,319 | 8–7 |
| 16 | April 30 | Cardinals | 5–0 | **Reuss** (1–2) | Gibson | — | 5,584 | 9–7 |

May: 15–11 (Home: 8–2; Away: 7–9)

| # | Date | Opponent | Score | Win | Loss | Save | Attendance | Record |
|---|---|---|---|---|---|---|---|---|
| 17 | May 2 | @ Phillies | 5–9 | Twitchell | **Kison** (2–1) | McGraw | 20,257 | 9–8 |
| 18 | May 3 | @ Phillies | 2–6 | Underwood | **Rooker** (2–1) | Garber | — | 9–9 |
| 19 | May 3 | @ Phillies | 3–4 (11) | McGraw | **Hernandez** (0–1) | — | 44,501 | 9–10 |
| 20 | May 6 | @ Mets | 2–1 (8) | **Brett** (2–1) | Seaver | — | 8,257 | 10–10 |
| 21 | May 7 | @ Mets | 6–1 | **Reuss** (2–2) | Matlack | — | 12,216 | 11–10 |
| 22 | May 8 | @ Mets | 4–2 | **Kison** (3–1) | Koosman | — | 14,053 | 12–10 |
| 23 | May 9 | Dodgers | 11–3 | **Ellis** (2–2) | Marshall | **Giusti** (3) | 16,378 | 13–10 |
| 24 | May 10 | Dodgers | 2–6 | Rau | **Rooker** (2–2) | — | 24,870 | 13–11 |
| 25 | May 11 | Dodgers | 0–7 | Sutton | **Brett** (2–2) | — | 15,175 | 13–12 |
| 26 | May 13 | Padres | 2–0 | **Reuss** (3–2) | Spillner | — | 5,482 | 14–12 |
| 27 | May 14 | Padres | 5–4 (11) | **McDowell** (1–1) | Greif | — | 8,334 | 15–12 |
| 28 | May 16 | @ Dodgers | 3–2 | **Giusti** (2–0) | Sutton | — | 44,111 | 16–12 |
| 29 | May 17 | @ Dodgers | 3–4 (10) | Messersmith | **Hernandez** (0–2) | — | 46,790 | 16–13 |
| 30 | May 18 | @ Dodgers | 7–2 | **Brett** (3–2) | Hooton | — | 42,013 | 17–13 |
| 31 | May 19 | @ Giants | 4–6 | Caldwell | **Reuss** (3–3) | — | 1,795 | 17–14 |
| 32 | May 20 | @ Giants | 4–12 | Halicki | **Ellis** (2–3) | — | 1,759 | 17–15 |
| 33 | May 21 | @ Giants | 1–2 (11) | Barr | **Giusti** (2–1) | — | 3,513 | 17–16 |
| 34 | May 22 | @ Padres | 4–2 | **Rooker** (3–2) | Freisleben | **Giusti** (4) | 9,148 | 18–16 |
| 35 | May 23 | @ Padres | 3–4 | Frisella | **Giusti** (2–2) | — | 14,858 | 18–17 |
| 36 | May 24 | @ Padres | 0–5 | Jones | **Reuss** (3–4) | — | 22,758 | 18–18 |
| 37 | May 25 | @ Padres | 6–5 (11) | **Hernandez** (1–2) | Frisella | **Demery** (1) | 28,778 | 19–18 |
| 38 | May 26 | Astros | 10–2 | **Kison** (4–1) | Richard | — | 11,126 | 20–18 |
| 39 | May 27 | Astros | 6–5 | **Demery** (2–0) | Niekro | — | 7,003 | 21–18 |
| 40 | May 28 | Astros | 3–0 | **Brett** (4–2) | Roberts | — | 7,601 | 22–18 |
| 41 | May 30 | Braves | 2–1 | **Reuss** (4–4) | Capra | — | 11,565 | 23–18 |
| 42 | May 31 | Braves | 11–4 | **Kison** (5–1) | Harrison | — | 13,423 | 24–18 |

June: 21–11 (Home: 11–6; Away: 10–5)

| # | Date | Opponent | Score | Win | Loss | Save | Attendance | Record |
|---|---|---|---|---|---|---|---|---|
| 43 | June 1 | Braves | 2–5 | Niekro | **Rooker** (3–3) | — | 37,373 | 24–19 |
| 44 | June 3 | Reds | 4–8 | Nolan | **Moose** (0–2) | — | 9,438 | 24–20 |
| 45 | June 4 | Reds | 2–1 | **Reuss** (5–4) | Norman | **Hernandez** (1) | 13,754 | 25–20 |
| 46 | June 6 | Giants | 7–2 | **Kison** (6–1) | Barr | — | 11,923 | 26–20 |
| 47 | June 7 | Giants | 7–6 | **Hernandez** (2–2) | Toms | **Giusti** (5) | 8,668 | 27–20 |
| 48 | June 8 | Giants | 1–3 | Halicki | **Candelaria** (0–1) | — | — | 27–21 |
| 49 | June 8 | Giants | 2–4 | Lavelle | **Demery** (2–1) | Moffitt | 24,128 | 27–22 |
| 50 | June 9 | @ Reds | 9–2 | **Reuss** (6–4) | Norman | — | 22,555 | 28–22 |
| 51 | June 10 | @ Reds | 9–5 | **McDowell** (2–1) | Darcy | **Hernandez** (2) | 19,107 | 29–22 |
| 52 | June 11 | @ Astros | 1–5 | Dierker | **Kison** (6–2) | — | 10,125 | 29–23 |
| 53 | June 12 | @ Astros | 4–2 | **Ellis** (3–3) | Roberts | **Demery** (2) | 10,802 | 30–23 |
| 54 | June 13 | @ Braves | 8–3 | **Rooker** (4–3) | Odom | — | 8,998 | 31–23 |
| 55 | June 14 | @ Braves | 2–1 | **Reuss** (7–4) | Thompson | **Giusti** (6) | 29,308 | 32–23 |
| 56 | June 15 | @ Braves | 8–6 | **Demery** (3–1) | Sosa | — | 8,352 | 33–23 |
| 57 | June 16 | Cardinals | 10–4 | **Kison** (7–2) | Bryant | — | 13,003 | 34–23 |
| 58 | June 17 | Cardinals | 4–7 | McGlothen | **Ellis** (3–4) | Garman | 15,898 | 34–24 |
| 59 | June 18 | Cardinals | 9–3 | **Rooker** (5–3) | Reed | — | 22,345 | 35–24 |
| 60 | June 19 | Cardinals | 5–0 | **Reuss** (8–4) | Curtis | — | 8,198 | 36–24 |
| 61 | June 20 | @ Mets | 5–1 | **Candelaria** (1–1) | Hall | — | 47,867 | 37–24 |
| 62 | June 21 | @ Mets | 7–3 | **Hernandez** (3–2) | Parker | — | 31,610 | 38–24 |
| 63 | June 22 | @ Mets | 2–0 | **Ellis** (4–4) | Tate | — | 34,287 | 39–24 |
| 64 | June 23 | @ Phillies | 5–6 | Hilgendorf | **Demery** (3–2) | Garber | 34,759 | 39–25 |
| 65 | June 24 | @ Phillies | 3–6 | Christenson | **Reuss** (8–5) | McGraw | — | 39–26 |
| 66 | June 24 | @ Phillies | 1–8 | Underwood | **Kison** (7–3) | — | 50,463 | 39–27 |
| 67 | June 25 | @ Phillies | 6–7 (13) | Schueler | **Giusti** (2–3) | — | 34,171 | 39–28 |
| 68 | June 26 | Cubs | 5–2 | **Candelaria** (2–1) | Frailing | — | 10,394 | 40–28 |
| 69 | June 27 | Cubs | 5–1 | **Ellis** (5–4) | Zahn | — | — | 41–28 |
| 70 | June 27 | Cubs | 5–3 | **Hernandez** (4–2) | Knowles | **Giusti** (7) | 34,972 | 42–28 |
| 71 | June 28 | Cubs | 0–1 | Bonham | **Rooker** (5–4) | — | 16,477 | 42–29 |
| 72 | June 29 | Cubs | 4–3 | **Giusti** (3–3) | Reuschel | — | — | 43–29 |
| 73 | June 29 | Cubs | 7–0 | **Reuss** (9–5) | Dettore | — | 37,145 | 44–29 |
| 74 | June 30 | @ Expos | 5–3 | **Demery** (4–2) | Blair | **Tekulve** (1) | 13,134 | 45–29 |

July: 18–12 (Home: 9–6; Away: 9–6)

| # | Date | Opponent | Score | Win | Loss | Save | Attendance | Record |
|---|---|---|---|---|---|---|---|---|
| 75 | July 1 | @ Expos | 10–4 | **Candelaria** (3–1) | Fryman | — | 15,132 | 46–29 |
| 76 | July 3 | @ Expos | 5–1 | **Ellis** (6–4) | Rogers | — | 10,116 | 47–29 |
| 77 | July 4 | @ Cubs | 1–6 | Stone | **Kison** (7–4) | — | — | 47–30 |
| 78 | July 4 | @ Cubs | 1–2 (11) | Knowles | **Reuss** (9–6) | — | 30,355 | 47–31 |
| 79 | July 5 | @ Cubs | 5–4 | **Rooker** (6–4) | Burris | **Hernandez** (3) | 22,393 | 48–31 |
| 80 | July 6 | @ Cubs | 18–12 | **Hernandez** (5–2) | Frailing | — | 28,023 | 49–31 |
| 81 | July 7 | @ Cubs | 5–0 | **Brett** (5–2) | Reuschel | **Giusti** (8) | 16,540 | 50–31 |
| 82 | July 8 | Dodgers | 0–3 | Sutton | **Ellis** (6–5) | Marshall | 29,376 | 50–32 |
| 83 | July 9 | Dodgers | 3–2 | **Kison** (8–4) | Messersmith | **Giusti** (9) | 22,163 | 51–32 |
| 84 | July 10 | Dodgers | 4–1 | **Reuss** (10–6) | Hooton | **Giusti** (10) | 18,521 | 52–32 |
| 85 | July 11 | Padres | 6–2 | **Rooker** (7–4) | Folkers | **Giusti** (11) | — | 53–32 |
| 86 | July 11 | Padres | 5–0 | **Candelaria** (4–1) | McIntosh | — | 31,435 | 54–32 |
| 87 | July 12 | Padres | 6–4 | **Hernandez** (6–2) | Jones | **Demery** (3) | 21,877 | 55–32 |
| 88 | July 13 | Padres | 5–7 | Strom | **Ellis** (6–6) | Spillner | 20,113 | 55–33 |
| 89 | July 17 | @ Dodgers | 5–2 | **Kison** (9–4) | Messersmith | **Giusti** (12) | 32,806 | 56–33 |
| 90 | July 18 | @ Dodgers | 3–4 | Marshall | **Demery** (4–3) | — | 52,506 | 56–34 |
| 91 | July 19 | @ Dodgers | 5–3 | **Giusti** (4–3) | Marshall | — | 51,591 | 57–34 |
| 92 | July 20 | @ Giants | 1–2 | Halicki | **Rooker** (7–5) | — | — | 57–35 |
| 93 | July 20 | @ Giants | 7–1 | **Brett** (6–2) | Caldwell | — | 14,723 | 58–35 |
| 94 | July 21 | @ Giants | 2–7 | Barr | **Candelaria** (4–2) | — | 3,417 | 58–36 |
| 95 | July 22 | @ Padres | 0–1 | Jones | **Kison** (9–5) | — | 14,437 | 58–37 |
| 96 | July 23 | @ Padres | 8–1 | **Ellis** (7–6) | Freisleben | — | 14,547 | 59–37 |
| 97 | July 25 | Expos | 6–1 | **Reuss** (11–6) | DeMola | — | 20,124 | 60–37 |
| 98 | July 26 | Expos | 2–5 | Rogers | **Rooker** (7–6) | — | 4,394 | 60–38 |
| 99 | July 27 | Expos | 4–1 | **Brett** (7–2) | Scherman | **Demery** (4) | — | 61–38 |
| 100 | July 27 | Expos | 5–3 | **Giusti** (5–3) | Warthen | — | 27,961 | 62–38 |
| 101 | July 28 | Phillies | 2–5 | Christenson | **Kison** (9–6) | — | 30,221 | 62–39 |
| 102 | July 29 | Phillies | 1–5 | Underwood | **Ellis** (7–7) | — | 33,340 | 62–40 |
| 103 | July 30 | Phillies | 8–1 | **Reuss** (12–6) | Carlton | — | 43,260 | 63–40 |
| 104 | July 31 | Mets | 2–6 | Koosman | **Rooker** (7–7) | — | 13,235 | 63–41 |

August: 12–17 (Home: 10–5; Away: 2–12)

| # | Date | Opponent | Score | Win | Loss | Save | Attendance | Record |
|---|---|---|---|---|---|---|---|---|
| 105 | August 1 | Mets | 2–4 | Stone | **Brett** (7–3) | Apodaca | 18,082 | 63–42 |
| 106 | August 2 | Mets | 0–6 | Matlack | **Kison** (9–7) | — | 14,306 | 63–43 |
| 107 | August 3 | Mets | 5–4 (15) | **Demery** (5–3) | Apodaca | — | — | 64–43 |
| 108 | August 3 | Mets | 4–3 | **Candelaria** (5–2) | Webb | — | 30,070 | 65–43 |
| 109 | August 4 | @ Cardinals | 4–5 | Curtis | **Reuss** (12–7) | Hrabosky | 28,097 | 65–44 |
| 110 | August 5 | @ Cardinals | 6–1 | **Rooker** (8–7) | Rasmussen | — | 25,489 | 66–44 |
| 111 | August 6 | @ Cardinals | 2–4 | Denny | **Brett** (7–4) | Hrabosky | 23,985 | 66–45 |
| 112 | August 7 | @ Astros | 1–6 | Roberts | **Kison** (9–8) | — | 15,255 | 66–46 |
| 113 | August 8 | @ Astros | 3–5 | Crawford | **Tekulve** (0–1) | — | 14,889 | 66–47 |
| 114 | August 9 | @ Astros | 0–5 | Niekro | **Reuss** (12–8) | — | 13,531 | 66–48 |
| 115 | August 10 | @ Astros | 3–5 | Richard | **Rooker** (8–8) | Cosgrove | 12,243 | 66–49 |
| 116 | August 11 | @ Braves | 8–1 | **Candelaria** (6–2) | Easterly | **Tekulve** (2) | 4,701 | 67–49 |
| 117 | August 12 | @ Braves | 2–3 | Morton | **Kison** (9–9) | House | 4,506 | 67–50 |
| 118 | August 13 | @ Braves | 3–4 | House | **Brett** (7–5) | — | 4,163 | 67–51 |
| 119 | August 14 | @ Reds | 1–6 | Nolan | **Reuss** (12–9) | — | 40,062 | 67–52 |
| 120 | August 15 | @ Reds | 3–8 | Norman | **Rooker** (8–9) | — | 45,003 | 67–53 |
| 121 | August 16 | @ Reds | 3–5 | Billingham | **Candelaria** (6–3) | Eastwick | 51,286 | 67–54 |
| 122 | August 17 | @ Reds | 1–3 | Darcy | **Kison** (9–10) | Eastwick | 50,121 | 67–55 |
| 123 | August 19 | Giants | 4–0 | **Reuss** (13–9) | Barr | — | 22,609 | 68–55 |
| 124 | August 20 | Giants | 3–1 | **Rooker** (9–9) | Halicki | **Giusti** (13) | 14,033 | 69–55 |
| 125 | August 22 | Reds | 7–2 | **Demery** (6–3) | Billingham | — | — | 70–55 |
| 126 | August 22 | Reds | 4–2 | **Candelaria** (7–3) | McEnaney | **Giusti** (14) | 46,576 | 71–55 |
| 127 | August 23 | Reds | 7–12 | Kirby | **Kison** (9–11) | Eastwick | 32,068 | 71–56 |
| 128 | August 24 | Reds | 5–1 | **Reuss** (14–9) | Nolan | — | 35,598 | 72–56 |
| 129 | August 25 | Braves | 4–0 | **Rooker** (10–9) | Thompson | — | 11,146 | 73–56 |
| 130 | August 26 | Braves | 8–2 | **Demery** (7–3) | Easterly | — | 12,213 | 74–56 |
| 131 | August 27 | Braves | 2–6 | Niekro | **Candelaria** (7–4) | — | 21,209 | 74–57 |
| 132 | August 30 | Astros | 4–7 | Dierker | **Reuss** (14–10) | — | 13,473 | 74–58 |
| 133 | August 31 | Astros | 9–6 | **Kison** (10–11) | Sosa | **Giusti** (15) | 14,507 | 75–58 |

September: 17–11 (Home: 8–5; Away: 9–6)

| # | Date | Opponent | Score | Win | Loss | Save | Attendance | Record |
|---|---|---|---|---|---|---|---|---|
| 134 | September 1 | @ Mets | 0–3 | Seaver | **Candelaria** (7–5) | — | 45,991 | 75–59 |
| 135 | September 2 | @ Mets | 8–4 | **Tekulve** (1–1) | Koosman | **Giusti** (16) | 26,486 | 76–59 |
| 136 | September 3 | @ Mets | 3–1 | **Reuss** (15–10) | Matlack | — | 27,599 | 77–59 |
| 137 | September 5 | @ Expos | 3–4 (10) | Taylor | **Tekulve** (1–2) | — | — | 77–60 |
| 138 | September 5 | @ Expos | 5–2 | **Rooker** (11–9) | Renko | **Hernandez** (4) | 15,130 | 78–60 |
| 139 | September 6 | @ Expos | 12–5 (11) | **Brett** (8–5) | Murray | — | 10,206 | 79–60 |
| 140 | September 7 | @ Expos | 6–0 | **Reuss** (16–10) | Blair | — | 14,041 | 80–60 |
| 141 | September 8 | Cubs | 4–1 | **Ellis** (8–7) | Prall | **Hernandez** (5) | 6,756 | 81–60 |
| 142 | September 9 | Cubs | 5–6 | Bonham | **Demery** (7–4) | Reuschel | 7,346 | 81–61 |
| 143 | September 10 | Mets | 8–4 | **Rooker** (12–9) | Seaver | — | 11,988 | 82–61 |
| 144 | September 11 | Mets | 0–7 | Koosman | **Reuss** (16–11) | — | 4,762 | 82–62 |
| 145 | September 12 | Expos | 6–3 | **Moose** (1–2) | Carrithers | — | 9,449 | 83–62 |
| 146 | September 13 | Expos | 2–5 | Warthen | **Ellis** (8–8) | Fryman | 17,310 | 83–63 |
| 147 | September 14 | Expos | 4–3 | **Hernandez** (7–2) | Fryman | **Giusti** (17) | 12,335 | 84–63 |
| 148 | September 15 | @ Cubs | 5–6 | Knowles | **Giusti** (5–4) | — | — | 84–64 |
| 149 | September 15 | @ Cubs | 9–1 | **Rooker** (13–9) | Prall | — | 5,432 | 85–64 |
| 150 | September 16 | @ Cubs | 22–0 | **Candelaria** (8–5) | Reuschel | — | 4,932 | 86–64 |
| 151 | September 17 | @ Phillies | 9–1 | **Kison** (11–11) | Underwood | — | 38,085 | 87–64 |
| 152 | September 18 | @ Phillies | 1–4 | Carlton | **Ellis** (8–9) | — | 27,093 | 87–65 |
| 153 | September 19 | Cardinals | 7–1 | **Brett** (9–5) | Denny | — | 19,671 | 88–65 |
| 154 | September 20 | Cardinals | 2–8 | Rasmussen | **Rooker** (13–10) | Hrabosky | 13,493 | 88–66 |
| 155 | September 21 | Cardinals | 5–3 | **Reuss** (17–11) | Garman | **Tekulve** (3) | 35,648 | 89–66 |
| 156 | September 22 | Phillies | 11–3 | **Kison** (12–11) | Underwood | **Tekulve** (4) | 13,176 | 90–66 |
| 157 | September 23 | Phillies | 3–1 | **Moose** (2–2) | Carlton | — | 6,445 | 91–66 |
| 158 | September 24 | Phillies | 1–8 | Christenson | **Demery** (7–5) | — | 6,253 | 91–67 |
| 159 | September 26 | @ Cardinals | 0–1 | Forsch | **Rooker** (13–11) | — | 23,496 | 91–68 |
| 160 | September 27 | @ Cardinals | 4–2 | **Reuss** (18–11) | McGlothen | **Tekulve** (5) | 19,180 | 92–68 |
| 161 | September 28 | @ Cardinals | 2–6 | Reed | **Candelaria** (8–6) | — | 20,909 | 92–69 |

Legend: = Win = Loss
Bold = Pirates team member

=== Detailed records ===
National League
| Opponent | W | L | WP | RS | RA |
NL East
| Chicago Cubs | 12 | 6 | 0.667 | 111 | 56 |
| Montreal Expos | 11 | 7 | 0.611 | 82 | 61 |
| New York Mets | 13 | 5 | 0.722 | 67 | 56 |
| Philadelphia Phillies | 7 | 11 | 0.389 | 73 | 79 |
| **Pittsburgh Pirates** | | | | | |
| St. Louis Cardinals | 10 | 8 | 0.556 | 81 | 54 |
| Total | 53 | 37 | 0.589 | 414 | 306 |
NL West
| Atlanta Braves | 8 | 4 | 0.667 | 60 | 36 |
| Cincinnati Reds | 6 | 6 | 0.500 | 55 | 55 |
| Houston Astros | 5 | 6 | 0.455 | 44 | 48 |
| Los Angeles Dodgers | 7 | 5 | 0.583 | 46 | 39 |
| San Diego Padres | 8 | 4 | 0.667 | 50 | 35 |
| San Francisco Giants | 5 | 7 | 0.417 | 43 | 46 |
| Total | 39 | 32 | 0.549 | 298 | 259 |
| Season Total | 92 | 69 | 0.571 | 712 | 565 |

| Month | Games | Won | Lost | Win % | RS | RA |
|---|---|---|---|---|---|---|
| April | 16 | 9 | 7 | 0.563 | 59 | 49 |
| May | 26 | 15 | 11 | 0.577 | 109 | 99 |
| June | 32 | 21 | 11 | 0.656 | 154 | 111 |
| July | 30 | 18 | 12 | 0.600 | 135 | 96 |
| August | 29 | 12 | 17 | 0.414 | 108 | 117 |
| September | 28 | 17 | 11 | 0.607 | 147 | 93 |
| Total | 161 | 92 | 69 | 0.571 | 712 | 565 |

| | Games | Won | Lost | Win % | RS | RA |
| Home | 80 | 52 | 28 | 0.650 | 348 | 270 |
| Away | 81 | 40 | 41 | 0.494 | 364 | 295 |
| Total | 161 | 92 | 69 | 0.571 | 712 | 565 |

=== Notable transactions ===
- April 2, 1975: Sam McDowell was signed as a free agent by the Pirates.
- June 3, 1975: Ernie Camacho was drafted by the Pirates in the 12th round of the 1975 Major League Baseball draft, but did not sign.
- June 26, 1975: Sam McDowell was released by the Pirates.
- July 30, 1975: Paul Popovich was released by the Pirates.

=== Roster ===
1975 Pittsburgh Pirates
**Roster**
| **Pitchers**: 30 Ken Brett; 45 John Candelaria; 44 Larry Demery; 17 Dock Ellis; 31 Dave Giusti; 36 Ramón Hernández; 51 Odell Jones; 25 Bruce Kison; 48 Sam McDowell; 29,48 Jim Minshall; 38 Bob Moose; 41 Jerry Reuss; 19 Jim Rooker; 27 Kent Tekulve | **Catchers**: 5 Duffy Dyer; 32 Ed Ott; 35 Manny Sanguillén; **Infielders**: 3 Richie Hebner; 14 Art Howe; 23 Ed Kirkpatrick; 11 Mario Mendoza; 24 Paul Popovich; 18 Willie Randolph; 12 Craig Reynolds; 7 Bob Robertson; 8 Willie Stargell; 6 Rennie Stennett; 10 Frank Taveras | **Outfielders**: 15 Miguel Diloné; 24 Omar Moreno; 16 Al Oliver; 39 Dave Parker; 28 Bill Robinson; 22 Richie Zisk | **Manager**: 40 Danny Murtaugh; **Coaches**: 43 Don Leppert; 42 Don Osborn; 2 José Pagán; 4 Bob Skinner |

== Player stats ==
| = Indicates team leader |

=== Batting ===
==== Starters by position ====
Note: Pos = Position; G = Games played; AB = At bats; H = Hits; Avg. = Batting average; HR = Home runs; RBI = Runs batted in

| Pos | Player | G | AB | H | Avg. | HR | RBI |
|---|---|---|---|---|---|---|---|
| C | Manny Sanguillén | 133 | 481 | 158 | .328 | 9 | 58 |
| 1B | Willie Stargell | 124 | 461 | 136 | .295 | 22 | 90 |
| 2B | Rennie Stennett | 148 | 616 | 176 | .286 | 7 | 62 |
| 3B | Richie Hebner | 128 | 472 | 116 | .246 | 15 | 57 |
| SS | Frank Taveras | 134 | 378 | 80 | .212 | 0 | 23 |
| LF | Richie Zisk | 147 | 504 | 146 | .290 | 20 | 75 |
| CF | Al Oliver | 155 | 628 | 176 | .280 | 18 | 84 |
| RF | Dave Parker | 148 | 558 | 172 | .308 | 25 | 101 |

==== Other batters ====
Note: G = Games played; AB = At bats; H = Hits; Avg. = Batting average; HR = Home runs; RBI = Runs batted in

| Player | G | AB | H | Avg. | HR | RBI |
|---|---|---|---|---|---|---|
| Bill Robinson | 92 | 200 | 56 | .280 | 6 | 33 |
| Art Howe | 63 | 146 | 25 | .171 | 1 | 10 |
| Ed Kirkpatrick | 89 | 144 | 34 | .236 | 5 | 16 |
| Bob Robertson | 75 | 124 | 34 | .274 | 6 | 18 |
| Duffy Dyer | 48 | 132 | 30 | .227 | 3 | 16 |
| Craig Reynolds | 31 | 76 | 17 | .224 | 0 | 4 |
| Willie Randolph | 30 | 61 | 10 | .164 | 0 | 3 |
| Mario Mendoza | 56 | 50 | 9 | .180 | 0 | 2 |
| Paul Popovich | 25 | 40 | 8 | .200 | 0 | 1 |
| Omar Moreno | 6 | 6 | 1 | .167 | 0 | 0 |
| Miguel Diloné | 18 | 6 | 0 | .000 | 0 | 0 |
| Ed Ott | 5 | 5 | 1 | .200 | 0 | 0 |

=== Pitching ===
==== Starting pitchers ====
Note: G = Games pitched; IP = Innings pitched; W = Wins; L = Losses; ERA = Earned run average; SO = Strikeouts

| Player | G | IP | W | L | ERA | SO |
|---|---|---|---|---|---|---|
| Jerry Reuss | 32 | 237.1 | 18 | 11 | 2.54 | 131 |
| Jim Rooker | 28 | 196.2 | 13 | 11 | 2.97 | 102 |
| Bruce Kison | 33 | 192.0 | 12 | 11 | 3.23 | 89 |
| Dock Ellis | 27 | 140.0 | 8 | 9 | 3.79 | 69 |
| John Candelaria | 18 | 120.2 | 8 | 6 | 2.76 | 95 |
| Ken Brett | 23 | 118.0 | 9 | 5 | 3.36 | 47 |

==== Other pitchers ====
Note: G = Games pitched; IP = Innings pitched; W = Wins; L = Losses; ERA = Earned run average; SO = Strikeouts

| Player | G | IP | W | L | ERA | SO |
|---|---|---|---|---|---|---|
| Larry Demery | 45 | 114.2 | 7 | 5 | 2.90 | 59 |
| Bob Moose | 23 | 67.2 | 2 | 2 | 3.72 | 34 |

==== Relief pitchers ====
Note: G = Games pitched; W = Wins; L = Losses; SV = Saves; ERA = Earned run average; SO = Strikeouts

| Player | G | W | L | SV | ERA | SO |
|---|---|---|---|---|---|---|
| Dave Giusti | 61 | 5 | 4 | 17 | 2.95 | 38 |
| Ramón Hernández | 46 | 7 | 2 | 5 | 2.95 | 43 |
| Kent Tekulve | 34 | 1 | 2 | 5 | 2.25 | 28 |
| Sam McDowell | 14 | 2 | 1 | 0 | 2.86 | 29 |
| Odell Jones | 2 | 0 | 0 | 0 | 0.00 | 2 |
| Jim Minshall | 1 | 0 | 0 | 0 | 0.00 | 2 |

== National League Championship Series ==
The Cincinnati Reds defeated the Pittsburgh Pirates, 3 games to 0.

| Game | Score | Date | Location | Attendance |
|---|---|---|---|---|
| 1 | Pittsburgh – 3, Cincinnati – 8 | October 4 | Riverfront Stadium | 54,633 |
| 2 | Pittsburgh – 1, Cincinnati – 6 | October 5 | Riverfront Stadium | 54,752 |
| 3 | Cincinnati – 5, Pittsburgh – 3 | October 7 | Three Rivers Stadium | 46,355 |

== Awards and honors ==
1975 Major League Baseball All-Star Game

== Farm system ==
| Level | Team | League | Manager |
|---|---|---|---|
| AAA | Charleston Charlies | International League | Steve Demeter |
| AA | Shreveport Captains | Texas League | Tim Murtaugh |
| A | Salem Pirates | Carolina League | Johnny Lipon |
| A | Charleston Pirates | Western Carolinas League | Mike Ryan |
| A-Short Season | Niagara Falls Pirates | New York–Penn League | Glenn Ezell |
| Rookie | GCL Pirates | Gulf Coast League | Woody Huyke |
