= Timmonsville High School =

South Carolina school

Location
- 304 Kemper Street; Timmonsville, South Carolina 29161; United States
- Coordinates: 34°07′43″N 79°56′53″W

Information
- Type: Public high school
- School district: Florence County School District 4
- Grades: 9–12
- Campus type: Rural
- Colors: Blue and orange
- Mascot: Whirlwind
- Website: www.florence4.k12.sc.us/timmonsville.html

Timmonsville High School was part of Florence County School District Four in Timmonsville, South Carolina.

== Overview ==
The high school was part of a school campus that also contained Brockington Elementary School and Johnson Middle School. The school campus complex was built in 2000 and contains all three schools in an interconnected building and the football field. The high school serves grades 9 through 12. The student/teacher ratio was 8 in comparison to the state average of 14. The high student population was approximately 270 students.

Timmonsville High School offered the following subjects: English, mathematics, science, social studies, Spanish, exceptional education, fine arts, physical education and health, Army ROTC, career and technology education, welding, electricity, cosmetology, health science technology, and business education.

Timmonsville High School was "Home of the Whirlwinds." As of 2016, Langston Brown was the principal of Timmonsville High School. As of 2009, there were 22 teaching staff members at the high school.

== Notable alumni ==
- Cale Yarborough (Class of 1957), former NASCAR driver and champion (1976, 1977, 1978)
- Mike Anderson (Class of 1969), former Major League Baseball (MLB) player
