= Tom Hilgendorf =

American baseball player (1942–2021)

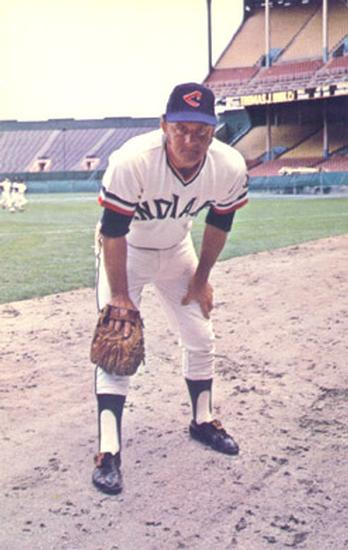
- Pitcher
- Born: March 10, 1942; Clinton, Iowa, U.S.
- Died: March 25, 2021 (aged 79); Iowa City, Iowa, U.S.
- Batted: Switch Threw: Left

MLB debut
- August 15, 1969, for the St. Louis Cardinals

Last MLB appearance
- September 28, 1975, for the Philadelphia Phillies

MLB statistics
- Win–loss record: 19–14
- Earned run average: 3.04
- Strikeouts: 173
- Stats at Baseball Reference

Teams
- St. Louis Cardinals (1969–1970); Cleveland Indians (1972–1974); Philadelphia Phillies (1975)

Thomas Eugene Hilgendorf (March 10, 1942 – March 25, 2021) was an American professional baseball player. He was a Major League relief pitcher for the St. Louis Cardinals, Cleveland Indians and Philadelphia Phillies in 1969–1970 and 1972–1975.

== Playing career ==
Tom Hilgendorf was signed by the Cardinals as a free agent in 1960 after attending St. Mary's High School in Clinton, Iowa. It took until 1969 for him to make it to the major leagues when the Cardinals brought him up from the minors as a 27-year-old rookie. The left-hander made his debut against Atlanta.

He was traded to the Kansas City Royals, then on to Cleveland, where the fork-baller managed six saves and a 5–3 record for a team that did not win very many games — in fact, the Indians finished last that year of 1973 in the American League East Division.

The following year, he was involved in the infamous Ten Cent Beer Night on June 4, 1974, and was hit by a steel folding chair thrown by one of the drunk fans who took part in the riot that ended the Indians game in a forfeit. The next night he came on in relief in the Indians' rout of the Texas Rangers.

Two days later, on Saturday, July 6, 1974 following Cleveland's 1-0 victory over the California Angels in Anaheim, Hilgendorf was walking back to his hotel and spotted a boy in the bottom of a pool at the Saga Motel near Disneyland. The pitcher dove into the pool fully clothed and saved the boy, 13-year-old Jerry Zaradte of San Francisco who had suffered leg cramps and could not move. “I got him up once, but he slipped back,” Hilgendorf was quoted as saying in newspapers. “The second time I made it. He’s a lucky kid. Normally I wouldn’t have passed by the pool but I decided to take a shortcut because it was getting late.”

His best year was also his last year when he won 7 and lost 3 with the Philadelphia Phillies in 1975.

Hilgendorf died on March 25, 2021, at the age of 79 at the University of Iowa Hospitals and Clinics in Iowa City, Iowa.
