= Ron Reed =

American baseball player (born 1942)

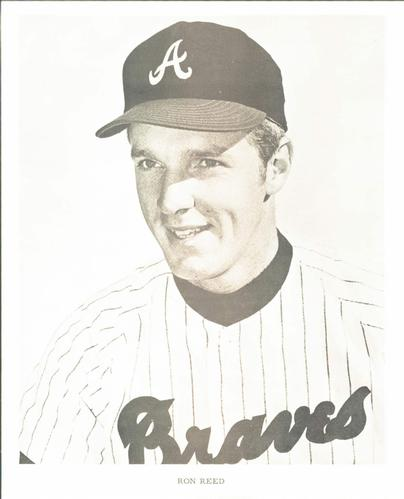
- Reed with the Braves in 1968
- Pitcher
- Born: November 2, 1942 (age 84); LaPorte, Indiana, U.S.
- Batted: Right Threw: Right

MLB debut
- September 26, 1966, for the Atlanta Braves

Last MLB appearance
- September 29, 1984, for the Chicago White Sox

MLB statistics
- Win–loss record: 146–140
- Earned run average: 3.46
- Strikeouts: 1,481
- Saves: 103
- Stats at Baseball Reference

Teams
- Atlanta Braves (1966–1975); St. Louis Cardinals (1975); Philadelphia Phillies (1976–1983); Chicago White Sox (1984)

Career highlights and awards
- All-Star (1968); World Series champion (1980); Philadelphia Phillies Wall of Fame
Basketball career
Personal information
Listed height	6 ft 5 in (1.96 m)
Listed weight	205 lb (93 kg)
Career information
High school	LaPorte (LaPorte, Indiana)
College	Notre Dame (1962–1965)
NBA draft	1965: 3rd round, 20th overall pick
Drafted by	Detroit Pistons
Playing career	1965–1967
Position	Power forward
Number	20
Career history
1965–1967	Detroit Pistons
Stats at NBA.com
Stats at Basketball Reference

Ronald Lee Reed (born November 2, 1942) is an American former professional baseball and basketball player. He spent two seasons as a power forward in the National Basketball Association (NBA) with the Detroit Pistons before spending nearly two decades as a Major League Baseball pitcher.

== Early life and education ==
Reed was born in LaPorte, Indiana, and was a baseball, basketball and football star at LaPorte High School. After high school, he attended Notre Dame on a basketball scholarship.

== Basketball career ==
=== Collegiate career ===
The 6’6″ forward set the Notre Dame single season rebounding record, averaging 17.7 a game his junior year. He averaged nineteen points and 14.3 rebounds a game over his college career on his way to being selected by the Detroit Pistons in the third round of the 1965 NBA draft. Shortly afterwards, he also signed as an amateur free agent to pitch for the Milwaukee Braves.

=== Professional career ===
Reed made his NBA debut with the Detroit Pistons in a 111–103 loss to the New York Knicks on October 16, 1965. He spent two seasons with the Pistons, and averaged 8 points per game. During the 1966–67 season, Reed informed head coach and teammate Dave DeBusschere — who was, himself, a two-sport star who pitched for the Chicago White Sox — that he had decided to pursue his baseball career.

Regardless, he was selected 25th overall by the Seattle SuperSonics in the 1967 NBA expansion draft.

== Baseball career ==
=== Minor leagues ===
Reed spent the 1965 season in the high A Florida State League. In 1966, he jumped all the way to triple A, while compiling a 13–5 record and 2.57 earned run average. He received a September call-up, and made his major league debut on September 26, 1966, against the San Francisco Giants. The fourth batter he faced, Willie McCovey, hit a two-run home run to give him the loss in his debut. He fared better in his second appearance. Starting against the Cincinnati Reds, he held them scoreless over six innings to pick up his first major league win. He spent the 1967 season with the Richmond Braves, and went 14–10 with a 2.51 ERA. He again received a September call-up, and went 1–1 with a 2.95 ERA in three starts.

=== Atlanta Braves ===
Reed joined the Atlanta Braves out of Spring training 1968. After three appearances out of the bullpen, Reed was moved into the starting rotation on April 29. He went 6–0 with a 1.73 ERA over his first six starts. His record fell to 8–4 with a 3.21 ERA by the All-Star break, but it was still good enough to earn him selection to the National League All-Star squad. Reed was one of six pitchers to hold the American League team scoreless.

In 1969, Reed won a career-high eighteen games to help the Braves capture the National League West crown in the first season of divisional play to reach the post-season for the first time since moving to Atlanta. He got the start in game two of the 1969 National League Championship Series against Jerry Koosman and the New York Mets. He surrendered four runs in just 1.2 innings to take the loss.

Reed spent five more seasons in Atlanta, going 49–66 with a 3.93 ERA and 490 strikeouts. He was the winning pitcher in the game in which Hank Aaron hit his 715th career home run, surpassing Babe Ruth for the all-time record.

=== St. Louis Cardinals ===
He was traded from the Braves to the St. Louis Cardinals for Ray Sadecki and Elias Sosa on May 28, 1975. Bob Gibson's Hall of Fame career was in its twilight when the Cardinals acquired Reed to replace him in the rotation. His first start with his new club came against his former franchise, and he allowed two runs (0 earned) over seven innings to pick up the victory. He went 9–8 with a 3.23 ERA his only season in St. Louis. Between the Braves and the Cards, Reed pitched 250.1 innings, faced 1067 batters, and surrendered only five home runs.

=== Philadelphia Phillies ===
Reed was acquired by the Philadelphia Phillies from the Cardinals for Mike Anderson at the Winter Meetings on December 9, 1975. In 1975, the Phillies finished in second place, 6.5 games behind the Pittsburgh Pirates, in the National League East. In 1975, Phillies relief pitchers were 28–22 with a 3.21 ERA. The Phillies acquired Reed with the intention of using him as a right-handed complement to Tug McGraw at the back end of the bullpen.

His career in Philadelphia got off to a rocky start. Following a poor performance against his former Cardinals teammates on May 22, 1976, Reed's record stood at 2–1 with a 4.95 ERA, with one of his two wins being the result of having blown a save for starter Steve Carlton on April 24.

From there, he became rock solid. Through August, Reed went 6–3 with twelve saves and a 1.97 ERA, while holding batters to a .188 batting average. For the season, he and McGraw combined for 25 saves, and a 2.48 ERA to help the Phillies win 101 games, and take their division by nine games.

Unfortunately, this success did not carry into the post season. Trailing Cincinnati's "Big Red Machine" two games to zero in the 1976 National League Championship Series, the Phillies jumped to a 3–0 lead in game three of the series. Manager Danny Ozark handed Reed the ball in the seventh inning with runners on first and second with no outs. He allowed both inherited runners to score, as well as giving up two more runs to allow Cincinnati to take a 4–3 lead. The Phillies battled back to recapture a 6–4 lead, however, Reed surrendered back-to-back home runs to George Foster and Johnny Bench to lead off the ninth. Five batters later, Ken Griffey Sr.'s bases loaded single off Tom Underwood completed the three-game sweep for the Reds.

Reed emerged as one of the most dominant pieces of Danny Ozark's bullpen. Over the next two seasons, Reed went 10–9 with 32 saves and a 2.51 ERA to help the Phillies capture their division for three consecutive seasons (they were defeated in the National League Championship Series by the Los Angeles Dodgers both times). 1978 was the first season of Reed's career that he did not make a single start. He did, however, amass a career high seventeen saves. In 1979, Reed led MLB with thirteen relief wins.

The Phillies returned to the post-season in 1980. Reed was the losing pitcher in game two of the 1980 National League Championship Series against the Houston Astros, however, he pitched shutout ball over the remainder of the post season, earning a save in game two of the World Series.

He also pitched in the inaugural National League Division Series in 1981 with Philadelphia (vs. Montreal); the Division Series format was adopted as a result of the players' strike. Reed's finest season in Philadelphia was his last. In 1983, Reed pitched 95.2 innings, and went 9–1 with eight saves. He appeared in three of the five World Series games against the Baltimore Orioles. After the season, and shortly after his 41st birthday, Reed was traded to the Chicago White Sox for a player to be named later. The White Sox sent fellow 41-year-old Jerry Koosman to the Phillies to complete the trade.

=== Chicago White Sox ===
In his only season in Chicago, Reed was 0–6 with a 3.08 ERA. He was released the following spring, and retired.

== Career statistics ==
=== MLB ===
Reed is one of fifteen pitchers in MLB history to have at least 100 wins and 100 saves. He is one of only five pitchers in MLB history to have 100 wins, 100 saves and 50 complete games. The other four are Ellis Kinder, Firpo Marberry, Dennis Eckersley and John Smoltz. Reed was 0–2 record with one save, and a 5.06 ERA over 32 innings in 22 postseason games.

W	L	PCT	ERA	G	GS	CG	SHO	SV	IP	BF	H	ER	R	HR	BAA	K	BB	BB/9	WP	HBP	Fld%	Avg.
146	140	.510	3.46	751	256	55	8	103	2477.1	10304	2374	953	1084	182	.252	1481	633	2.3	72	50	.975	.158

=== NBA ===
Legend
GP	Games played	GS	Games started	MPG	Minutes per game
FG%	Field goal percentage	3P%	3-point field goal percentage	FT%	Free throw percentage
RPG	Rebounds per game	APG	Assists per game	SPG	Steals per game
BPG	Blocks per game	PPG	Points per game	**Bold**	Career high

==== Regular season ====
Year	Team	GP	MPG	FG%	FT%	RPG	APG	PPG
1965–66	Detroit	57	17.5	.355	.540	5.9	**1.6**	7.5
1966–67	Detroit	**62**	**20.1**	**.372**	**.594**	**6.8**	1.3	**8.5**
Career		119	18.9	.364	.571	6.4	1.5	8.0

== Personal life ==
Reed is one of 13 athletes to have played in both the National Basketball Association and Major League Baseball. The thirteen are: Danny Ainge, Frank Baumholtz, Hank Biasatti, Gene Conley, Chuck Connors, Dave DeBusschere, Dick Groat, Steve Hamilton, Mark Hendrickson, Cotton Nash, Reed, Dick Ricketts and Howie Schultz.

In 1990, he was inducted into the Indiana Baseball Hall of Fame.

In 2005, he was inducted into National Polish-American Sports Hall of Fame.

In 2022, he was inducted into the Philadelphia Phillies Wall of Fame.
