= Ryan Kurosaki =

American baseball player (born 1952)

- Pitcher
- Born: July 3, 1952 (age 74); Honolulu, Hawaii, U.S.
- Batted: Right Threw: Right

MLB debut
- May 20, 1975, for the St. Louis Cardinals

Last MLB appearance
- June 16, 1975, for the St. Louis Cardinals

MLB statistics
- Win–loss record: 0–0
- Earned run average: 7.62
- Strikeouts: 6
- Stats at Baseball Reference

Teams
- St. Louis Cardinals (1975)

Ryan Yoshitomo Kurosaki (born July 3, 1952) is an American former professional baseball pitcher. He played in Major League Baseball (MLB) for the St. Louis Cardinals in 1975. Kurosaki was the first American player in MLB of full East Asian descent. Mike Lum, whose mother was Japanese, first made it to the top level in 1967.

The 5 ft 10 in (1.78 m), 160 lb (73 kg) Kurosaki attended the University of Nebraska–Lincoln and signed with the Cardinals as an amateur free agent in 1974. Called up by St. Louis to the majors during his second professional season, he debuted on May 20, 1975, against the San Diego Padres and pitched 1 2/3 hitless innings, although he walked three. In his seven MLB appearances, he did not earn a decision or a save, surrendering 15 hits (including three home runs) and 11 earned runs in 13 innings pitched. He issued seven walks and struck out six.

In 296 minor league games, all in the Cardinals organization and all but eight in relief, he compiled a 41–29 record with a 3.21 earned run average and 53 saves.
