= Bill Robinson (outfielder) =

American baseball player (1943–2007)

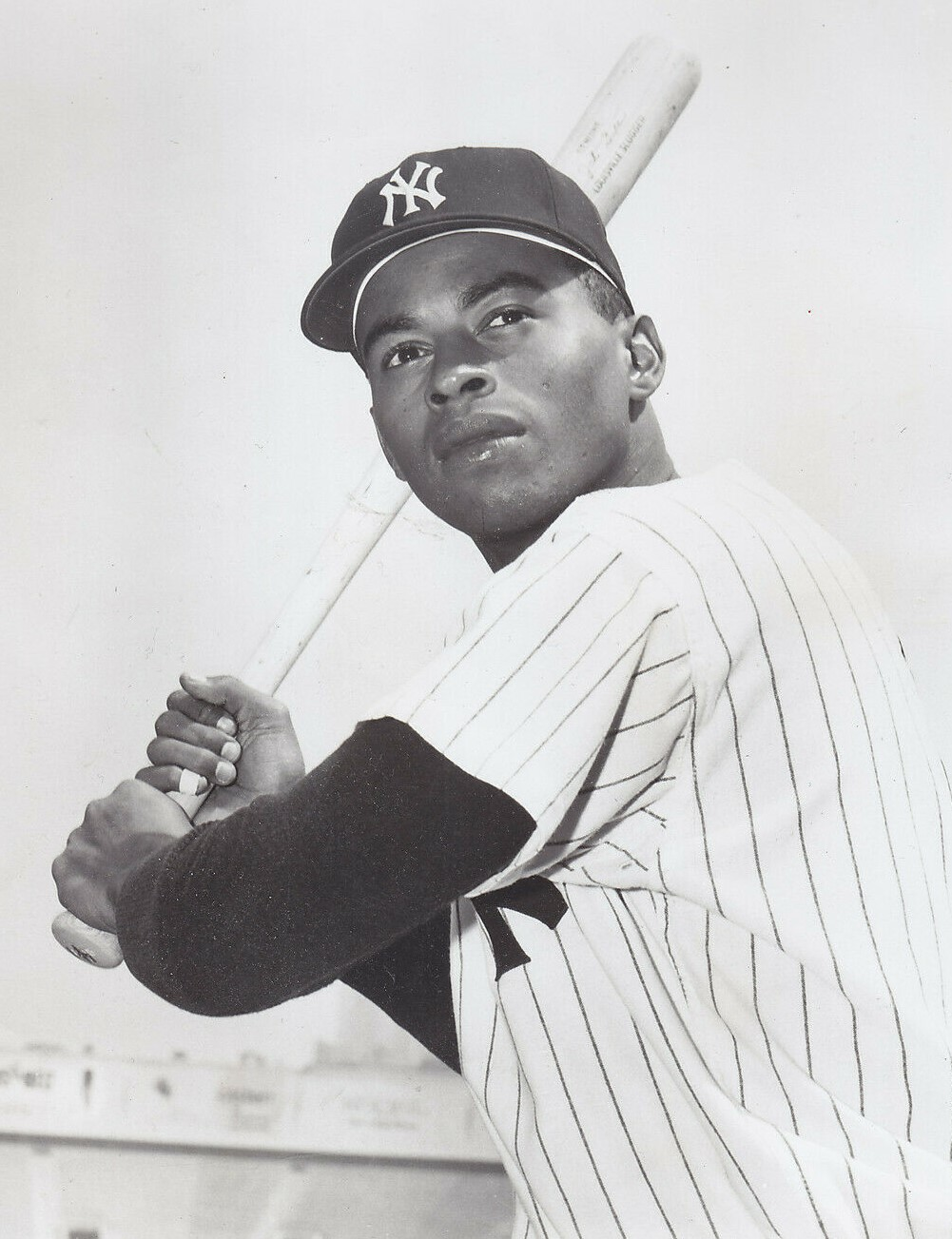
- Outfielder
- Born: June 26, 1943; McKeesport, Pennsylvania, U.S.
- Died: July 29, 2007 (aged 64); Las Vegas, Nevada, U.S.
- Batted: Right Threw: Right

MLB debut
- September 20, 1966, for the Atlanta Braves

Last MLB appearance
- May 23, 1983, for the Philadelphia Phillies

MLB statistics
- Batting average: .258
- Home runs: 166
- Runs batted in: 641
- Stats at Baseball Reference

Teams
- Atlanta Braves (1966); New York Yankees (1967–1969); Philadelphia Phillies (1972–1974); Pittsburgh Pirates (1975–1982); Philadelphia Phillies (1982–1983)

Career highlights and awards
- 3× World Series champion (1979, 1986, 2003)

William Henry Robinson, Jr. (June 26, 1943 – July 29, 2007) was an American professional baseball outfielder, who played in Major League Baseball (MLB) from 1966 to 1983, for several teams. He also played some first and third base. Robinson batted and threw right-handed.

After his playing days ended, Robinson moved on to a successful coaching career. He is cited as having been a key mentor in Darryl Strawberry's career, as well as several other young players he coached with the New York Mets.

Robinson collected three World Series rings, with the 1979 Pittsburgh Pirates as a player, and as a coach for both the 1986 Mets and 2003 Florida Marlins.

== Early life ==
Robinson (Jr.) was born in McKeesport, Pennsylvania to William Sr. and Nellie Mae Robinson. He starred in basketball as well as baseball at Elizabeth Forward High School, and received a basketball scholarship offer from Bradley University. However, Robinson chose baseball over basketball, and signed with the Milwaukee Braves, upon graduation in June, 1961.

== Playing career ==
=== Atlanta Braves ===
After six seasons in the Braves' farm system, in which he batted .298, with 69 home runs, and 339 runs batted in (RBI), Robinson made his MLB debut for the newly-relocated Atlanta Braves on September 20, 1966, pinch running for Hank Aaron, and staying in the game in right field. He got his first hit in his first start, September 25, against the Pirates. With the Braves leading 4-2, Robinson hit an RBI single off Al McBean, driving him out of the game. For the season, he collected three hits, including one triple, in eleven at bats, and drove in three runs. Following his only big-league season in Atlanta, Robinson and pitcher Chi-Chi Olivo were dealt to the New York Yankees for third baseman Clete Boyer.

=== New York Yankees ===
Robinson impressed upon arrival with his new franchise, receiving the James P. Dawson Memorial Award from Yankees sportswriters for the outstanding rookie in spring training 1967, and homering in the regular-season opener. Things soon went south for the man who was expected to replace Roger Maris in right field. By the end of the first month of the season, he lost his starting job in right to Steve Whitaker, and was relegated to fourth outfielder duties. Following an 0-for-3 performance against the Kansas City A's on May 31, 1967, Robinson's batting average fell to a season-low .101. By season's end, he did manage to raise his average to .196, with seven home runs, and 29 RBIs.

Robinson remained the Yankees' fourth outfielder throughout 1969, before spending the entire 1970 season with the International League Syracuse Chiefs. He was sent from the Yankees to the Chicago White Sox for Barry Moore on December 3, 1970.

=== Philadelphia Phillies ===
Robinson spent the 1971 season in the White Sox organization, batting .275, with fourteen home runs, and 81 RBIs for the AAA Tucson Toros. That December 13, he was dealt to the Phillies for minor league catcher Gerardo Rodriguez. Tearing up the Pacific Coast League with a .304 batting average, twenty home runs, and 66 RBIs, Robinson received a call up to Philadelphia in June 1972. Again a fourth outfielder, Robinson made 82 appearances, and displayed decent power, clubbing eight home runs in 188 at bats.

Robinson's breakthrough came in 1973. Platooning with Mike Anderson in right field, while occasionally playing center and left, and making fourteen appearances at third base, he batted .288, with 25 home runs, and 65 RBIs. However, Robinson's numbers dipped drastically in 1974, and just as the 1975 season was set to begin, he was dealt to the Pirates for Wayne Simpson.

=== Pittsburgh Pirates ===
During the 1975 season, Robinson batted .280, and reached the post season for the first time in his career. He went hitless in two at bats, as the Pirates were swept by Cincinnati's "Big Red Machine" in the 1975 National League Championship Series.

With the superstar outfield of Richie Zisk, Al Oliver, and Dave Parker, Pirates manager Danny Murtaugh experimented with Robinson at third base in 1976 despite his limited experience at the position. On June 5, Robinson hit two home runs against San Diego Padres Cy Young Award-winning pitcher Randy Jones. When the game went into extra innings, Robinson hit a third home run in the fourteenth inning off Dave Freisleben.

Between the four positions, Robinson made 416 plate appearances, and batted over .300 with 21 home runs to win the Roberto Clemente Memorial Award from the Pittsburgh sportswriters.

Starting third baseman Richie Hebner signed as a free agent with the Phillies after the season, and Robinson went into spring training 1977 preparing to take over the position. However, shortly into spring training, the Pirates completed an eight-player trade with the Oakland Athletics that brought Phil Garner to Pittsburgh, with the intention to shifting him from second to third base.

Injuries to teammates kept Robinson in the lineup despite his not having a regular position. An injury to Willie Stargell had Robinson playing first base for most of the first half of the season. He responded by batting .305, with ten home runs, and 46 RBIs heading into the All-Star break. Despite these impressive numbers, Robinson's name was kept off the 1977 Major League Baseball All-Star Game ballot, owing largely to his not having a regular position. Feeling snubbed, he vowed not to participate in the mid-summer classic at Yankee Stadium even if National League manager Sparky Anderson selected him as a reserve.

His hot hitting continued after the break. Over the rest of the month of July, Robinson batted .367 with four home runs and seventeen RBIs to help pull the Pirates within a game and a half of the first-place Phillies. For the season, he put up career highs in home runs (26), RBIs (104), batting average (.304) and runs (74).

On December 8, 1977, the Pirates, Mets, Texas Rangers, and Atlanta Braves completed a four-team, eleven-player trade that sent Oliver to the Rangers. This opened up a starting job for Robinson in left field, with John Milner (acquired from the Mets in the same deal) assuming the job of fourth outfielder and backup first baseman. Though his production fell off considerably in 1978, he was third on the Pirates in home runs (14) and RBIs (80) to Parker and Stargell in both cases.

After having finished second to the Phillies in the National League East for the previous three seasons, the "We Are Family" Pirates of 1979 engaged in a season-long battle with the Montreal Expos for the division. The season came down to a four-game set at Three Rivers Stadium, September 24 to 26. The Expos came to Pittsburgh a half game ahead of the Pirates, and kept that lead with the split of a doubleheader on the 24th. Robinson was the hitting star of the first-game win, with a home run, triple and three RBIs. For the series, he batted .400 to help his team take three of the four games and capture first place. The Pirates clinched the division to head to the 1979 National League Championship Series against the Cincinnati Reds on the final day of the season. Robinson, who entered the game as a defensive replacement in the sixth inning, singled with the bases loaded in his only at bat to drive in the two deciding runs in the Pirates' 5-3 victory over the Chicago Cubs.

The Pirates exacted some revenge for the 1975 NLCS, this time sweeping the Reds in three games to head to the World Series against the Baltimore Orioles. Robinson went five for nineteen, with two RBIs and two runs scores in the Pirates' stunning come from behind World Series victory.

Prior to the 1980 season, Robinson was nearly dealt to the Houston Astros, as he was 36 years old and beginning to show his age. Injuries, and the emergence of Mike Easler as a younger, better option in left, limited Robinson to just 69 starts, mostly at first base. He saw even less action in the strike-shortened 1981 season, batting just .216 in twenty starts.

=== Phillies again ===
On June 15, 1982, Robinson was traded back to the Phillies, in a three-team deal that landed the Pirates Wayne Nordhagen from the White Sox. Splitting time with George Vukovich and Dick Davis in right field, Robinson performed decently in his limited role, batting .261 with three home runs. His role diminished further in 1983, and he was released on June 9, with a .143 batting average.

| Games | PA | AB | Runs | Hits | 2B | 3B | HR | RBI | SB | BB | SO | HBP | Avg. | Slg. | Fld% |
| 1472 | 4730 | 4364 | 536 | 1127 | 229 | 29 | 166 | 641 | 71 | 263 | 820 | 16 | .258 | .438 | .980 |

== Post-playing career ==
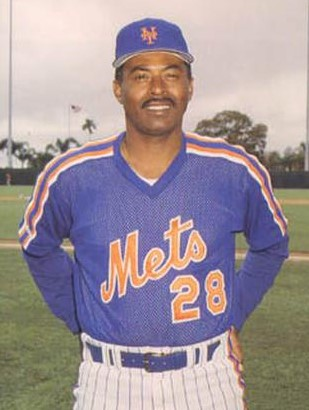
Robinson as New York Mets hitting instructor

Shortly after retiring as a player, Robinson accepted a job as hitting instructor (a title he insisted on being called as opposed to the more common term "batting coach") for incoming manager Davey Johnson's Mets. His players, most notably second baseman Wally Backman and outfielder Kevin Mitchell, affectionately called him "Uncle Bill."

During his tenure with the team, Robinson also managed the Caracas Lions of the Venezuelan Professional Baseball League, in order to gain experience that would make him a more attractive candidate for MLB teams looking to fill managerial vacancies. After the Mets unceremoniously dropped him following the 1989 season, he gave up his managerial dream, and signed to broadcast baseball games for ESPN.

In 1992, Robinson returned to the managing ranks, leading the San Francisco Giants' AA affiliate, the Shreveport Captains to a 77-59 record, and first place in the Texas League's Eastern Division. He also managed the AA Eastern League Reading Phillies in 1996. Robinson also served as a minor league hitting coach for the Yankees and was a minor league coach and manager in the Phillies' farm system.

== Death ==
Robinson died on July 29, 2007, at age 64 in a Las Vegas hotel room; the cause of death is unknown, although he was known to be suffering from diabetes. Robinson had been working as the Los Angeles Dodgers' minor league hitting coordinator, and had been visiting their AAA affiliate Las Vegas 51s, when he died. He was survived by his wife, Mary Alice, a son, and a daughter.
