= Mike Anderson (outfielder) =

American baseball player (born 1951)

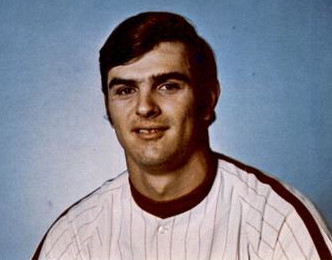
- Anderson in 1972
- Outfielder
- Born: June 22, 1951 (age 75); Florence, South Carolina, U.S.
- Batted: Right Threw: Right

MLB debut
- September 2, 1971, for the Philadelphia Phillies

Last MLB appearance
- September 30, 1979, for the Philadelphia Phillies

MLB statistics
- Batting average: .246
- Home runs: 28
- Runs batted in: 134
- Stats at Baseball Reference

Teams
- Philadelphia Phillies (1971–1975); St. Louis Cardinals (1976–1977); Baltimore Orioles (1978); Philadelphia Phillies (1979)

Michael Allen Anderson (born June 22, 1951) is an American former professional baseball outfielder. He is the brother of former Major League Baseball (MLB) infielder Kent Anderson.

== Career ==
=== First round draft pick ===
The Florence, South Carolina native signed a letter of intent to play tight end for the University of South Carolina upon graduation from Timmonsville High School in Timmonsville, South Carolina. He changed paths when he was drafted by the Philadelphia Phillies in the first round (sixth overall) of the 1969 Major League Baseball draft. Over three seasons in the Phillies' farm system, Anderson batted .322 with 21 home runs & 241 runs batted in to earn a September call up to the Phillies at just twenty years old.

=== Philadelphia Phillies ===
In his major league debut, he was struck out three times by the New York Mets' Gary Gentry. He rebounded nicely the next day, going three for four with a triple & an RBI. For the season, he batted .247 with two home runs & five RBIs.

During Spring training 1972, Anderson was hit in the head by a pitch from the Cincinnati Reds' Clay Carroll, and carried off the field on a stretcher. He recovered in time to begin the season as the Phillies' everyday right fielder, but after batting just .194 through May, he was demoted to triple A Eugene, with a platoon of Roger Freed & Oscar Gamble taking over in right. He played well for the Eugene Emeralds, batting .298 with seventeen home runs & 56 RBIs, but it wasn't enough to earn him a call backup to the majors that season.

He spent all of 1973 platooning with Bill Robinson in right field, and took over sole possession of the position in 1974. He managed a career high 34 RBIs, but failed to live up to the promise that made him one of the top Phillies' prospects when he first came up to the majors.

=== St. Louis Cardinals ===
Anderson was traded from the Phillies to the St. Louis Cardinals for Ron Reed at the Winter Meetings on December 9, 1975. He was used primarily as a backup corner outfielder & pinch hitter in 1976. He performed well in this role, batting .333 with four walks in 26 pinch hitting plate appearances. He was used more strictly in right field in 1977, and saw more limited use. He was released during Spring training 1978.

=== Baltimore Orioles ===
After being released by the Cards, Anderson signed a minor league deal with the Phillies. Though he played well for the triple A Oklahoma City 89ers (8 home runs, 34 RBIs, .313 batting average), he did not fit into the Phillies' plans. The team released him in order to allow him to sign elsewhere, and he was immediately picked up by the Baltimore Orioles. His stint in Baltimore did not go well. Used very sparingly by manager Earl Weaver, Anderson batted just .094 in 32 at bats. He was released after the season, and signed with the Phillies once again.

=== Phillies ===
After a brief stop in Oklahoma City, Anderson began his third stint with the Phillies on April 28, 1979 with a double in his first at bat. He received most of his playing time as a late inning defensive replacement for Greg Luzinski in left field, though his most memorable performance may have been when he made his debut on the mound on June 27. He struck out both of the first two batters he faced, and pitched a scoreless inning in an 11-4 loss to the Chicago Cubs.

He spent all of 1980 in Oklahoma City, and batted .327 with eight home runs, but it wasn't enough to earn a call up to the World Series championship team. He was released after the season. He spent part of the 1981 season in the Pittsburgh Pirates' minor league system before retiring.

== Career statistics ==
Games	PA	AB	Runs	Hits	2B	3B	HR	RBI	SB	BB	HBP	SO	Avg.	OBP	Slg.	Fld%
721	1675	1490	159	367	67	11	28	134	8	161	4	343	.246	.319	.362	.980

Anderson is a .316 career hitter in the minor leagues.
