= Rick Baldwin (baseball) =

American baseball player (1953–2020)

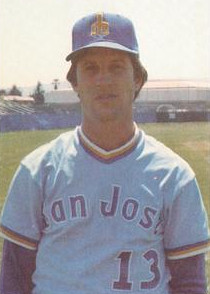
- Pitcher
- Born: June 1, 1953; Fresno, California, U.S.
- Died: October 30, 2020 (aged 67); Modesto, California, U.S.
- Batted: Right Threw: Right

MLB debut
- April 10, 1975, for the New York Mets

Last MLB appearance
- October 2, 1977, for the New York Mets

MLB statistics
- Win–loss record: 4–7
- Earned run average: 3.60
- Strikeouts: 86
- Stats at Baseball Reference

Teams
- New York Mets (1975–1977)

Rickey Alan Baldwin (June 1, 1953 – October 30, 2020) was an American professional baseball pitcher. He threw right-handed and batted left-handed.

== Career ==
The New York Mets drafted Baldwin in the ninth round of the 1971 Major League Baseball draft straight out of Thomas Downey High School in Modesto, California. Used primarily as a starting pitcher his first two seasons in the minors, he began seeing more work as a relief pitcher in 1973, and was used almost exclusively as a reliever in 1974. He compiled a 34–25 record with ten saves and a 4.03 earned run average over four seasons in the Mets' farm system when he earned a spot on the major league roster to start the 1975 season.

He made his major league debut on April 10, pitching a scoreless eighth inning in the Mets second game of the season, a 3–2 11-inning loss to the Philadelphia Phillies at Shea Stadium. He blew saves in his next two appearances, losing one and winning the other. In his next appearance, against the Chicago Cubs, Baldwin replaced Randy Tate in the seventh inning with runners on second and third and nobody out. He induced a weak fly ball, then struck out the next two batters to escape the inning without allowing a runner to score. He cruised along until the ninth, when he loaded the bases with two outs. A single by José Cardenal was misplayed by Mets left fielder Dave Kingman, allowing all three runners to score, and Cardenal to advance to third with the tying run, and slugging third baseman Bill Madlock coming to bat. Madlock flew out to right to end the game, and give Baldwin his first career save.

After getting off to a rough start (4.07 ERA through the first 2 months of the season), Baldwin emerged as one of the more reliable arms in manager Yogi Berra's bullpen (2.01 ERA in the month of June). For the season, Baldwin went 3–5 with a 3.33 ERA. He led Mets relievers in appearances (54) and innings pitched (97.1), and his six saves were second to Bob Apodaca (15).

Despite this modest success his rookie season, Baldwin spent most of the 1976 season with the triple A Tidewater Tides, going 8–4 with 14 saves and a 2.31 ERA. He made a brief call up in late May, making six appearances, mostly in "mop up duty." He returned as a September call up, and allowed just one earned run over 7.2 innings of work. All told, he was 0–0 in 22.7 innings, with an ERA of 2.38.

Baldwin also began the 1977 season in Tidewater, but was called up to the majors after the Mets released Ray Sadecki in early May. He had a 1–2 record and one save in 40 appearances, with a 4.45 ERA in 62.7 innings. Baldwin's final major league appearance came on October 2, 1977, when he faced two batters in the ninth inning, earning a save in a 6–4 Met win over the St. Louis Cardinals at Busch Memorial Stadium.

Baldwin was selected by the Seattle Mariners in the Rule 5 draft on December 5, 1977. In the 1978 season he had a 3–5 record with the Triple-A San Jose Missions (a Mariners affiliate) in the Pacific Coast League and a 3–3 record with the Columbus Clippers of the Triple-A International League (an affiliate of the Pittsburgh Pirates).

Baldwin died from complications of COVID-19 in Modesto, California, on October 30, 2020, at age 67.
