= Doug Konieczny =

American baseball player (born 1951)

- Pitcher
- Born: September 27, 1951 (age 74); Detroit, Michigan, U.S.
- Batted: Right Threw: Right

MLB debut
- September 11, 1973, for the Houston Astros

Last MLB appearance
- April 30, 1977, for the Houston Astros

MLB statistics
- Win–loss record: 7–18
- Earned run average: 4.93
- Strikeouts: 110
- Stats at Baseball Reference

Teams
- Houston Astros (1973–1975, 1977)

Douglas James Konieczny (/koʊˈnɛzni/ koh-NEZ-nee; September 27, 1951) is a former Major League Baseball (MLB) pitcher. Konieczny pitched in all or part of four seasons between 1973 and 1977, all for the Houston Astros.

Konieczny graduated from St. Ladislaus High School in Hamtramck, Michigan in June 1969 and was drafted by the Detroit Tigers in the 23rd round but did not sign with them. He was then selected by the Houston Astros in the first-round pick (3rd overall) in the secondary phase of the January 1971 Major League Baseball draft. He made his major league debut two seasons later when he earned a September call-up in 1973. He had no decision in his first start, a night game, on September 11, 1973 against the San Diego Padres at San Diego Stadium. Recorded attendance for the game was 1,413. Opposing starting pitcher was Randy Jones. Konieczny pitched six innings giving up six hits, two runs, and had one strike out before being relieved by Jim York. He pitched only one full season in the majors, in 1975, when he compiled a 6–13 record with a 4.47 ERA in 32 games (29 starts).

== Sources ==
- Career statistics from MLB · Baseball Reference · Baseball Reference (Minors) · Retrosheet · Baseball Almanac
