= Dennis Blair (baseball) =

American baseball player (born 1954)

- Pitcher
- Born: June 5, 1954 (age 72); Middletown, Ohio, U.S.
- Batted: Right Threw: Right

MLB debut
- May 26, 1974, for the Montreal Expos

Last MLB appearance
- July 4, 1980, for the San Diego Padres

MLB statistics
- Win–loss record: 19–25
- Earned run average: 3.69
- Strikeouts: 178
- Stats at Baseball Reference

Teams
- Montreal Expos (1974–1976); San Diego Padres (1980)

Dennis Herman Blair (born June 5, 1954) is an American former Major League Baseball (MLB) pitcher for the Montreal Expos during the 1974–1976 seasons and for the San Diego Padres in 1980. Blair grew up in Rialto, California, and attended Eisenhower High School in Rialto.

After his major league career ended in 1982, he worked and attended California State University San Bernardino. He graduated in 1993 with a Liberal Studies Bachelor of Arts degree and completed his master's degree at Lamar University.

He moved to Texas and taught students with special needs in Garland and Mesquite Independent School Districts. He retired from teaching in 2016 and lives in the Phoenix area part of the year. He is married and has two sons, a step-son and three grandchildren.
