= Randy Tate (baseball) =

American baseball player (1952–2021)

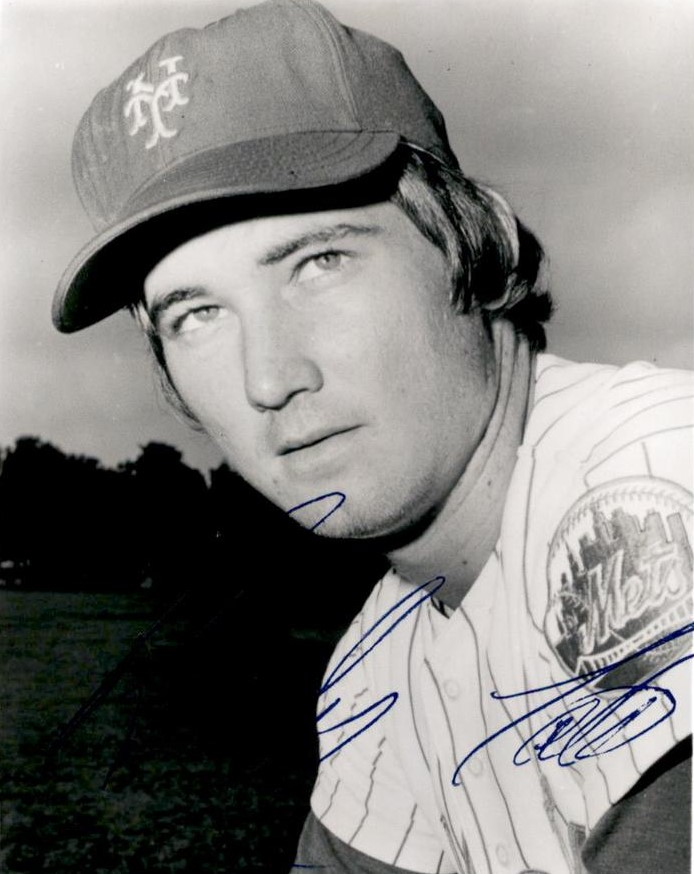
- Starting pitcher
- Born: October 23, 1952; Florence, Alabama, U.S.
- Died: March 25, 2021 (aged 68); Muscle Shoals, Alabama, U.S.
- Batted: Right Threw: Right

MLB debut
- April 14, 1975, for the New York Mets

Last MLB appearance
- September 27, 1975, for the New York Mets

MLB statistics
- Win–loss record: 5–13
- Earned run average: 4.45
- Strikeouts: 99
- Stats at Baseball Reference

Teams
- New York Mets (1975)

Randall Lee Tate (October 23, 1952 – March 25, 2021) was an American professional baseball pitcher who played for the New York Mets in their 1975 season.

== Career ==
His record that year was 5 wins and 13 losses with an earned run average of 4.45. While Tate is noted for never having achieved a Major League hit despite having 41 at bats (the most at bats by a player without a hit in MLB history) he is best known for nearly pitching a no-hitter on August 4, 1975 at Shea Stadium against the Montreal Expos. Despite not allowing a hit through seven and one third innings, Tate ended up losing the game—which seems to have been the final straw for Mets management regarding the tenure of manager Yogi Berra, who was fired the next day.

After spending the entire 1975 season in the Mets starting pitching rotation, Tate was sent to the Mets' class AAA minor league affiliate at Tidewater for the 1976 season. He pitched poorly and never made another major league appearance. After 1976, Tate was traded to the Pittsburgh Pirates and pitched for their Triple A affiliate. He tore his rotator cuff and was forced out of the league.

== Death ==
Tate died from complications of COVID-19 in Muscle Shoals, Alabama, on March 25, 2021, during the COVID-19 pandemic in Alabama. He was 68.
