= 1975 San Francisco Giants season =

1975 San Francisco Giants
- League: National League
- Division: West
- Ballpark: Candlestick Park
- City: San Francisco
- Owners: Horace Stoneham
- General managers: Jerry Donovan, Spec Richardson
- Managers: Wes Westrum
- Television: KTVU (Al Michaels, Gary Park)
- Radio: KSFO (Al Michaels, Art Eckman)

The 1975 San Francisco Giants season was the Giants' 93rd season in Major League Baseball, their 18th season in San Francisco since their move from New York following the 1957 season, and their 16th at Candlestick Park. The team finished in third place in the National League West with an 80–81 record, 27½ games behind the Cincinnati Reds.

== Offseason ==
- October 14, 1974: Ken Rudolph and Elías Sosa were traded by the Giants to the St. Louis Cardinals for Marc Hill.
- October 22, 1974: Bobby Bonds was traded by the Giants to the New York Yankees for Bobby Murcer.
- December 6, 1974: Tito Fuentes and Butch Metzger were traded by the Giants to the San Diego Padres for Derrel Thomas.
- January 29, 1975: Von Joshua was selected off waivers by the Giants from the Los Angeles Dodgers.

== Regular season ==
=== Season standings ===
NL West
Team	W	L	Pct.	GB	Home	Road
Cincinnati Reds	108	54	.667	—	64‍–‍17	44‍–‍37
Los Angeles Dodgers	88	74	.543	20	49‍–‍32	39‍–‍42
San Francisco Giants	80	81	.497	27½	46‍–‍35	34‍–‍46
San Diego Padres	71	91	.438	37	38‍–‍43	33‍–‍48
Atlanta Braves	67	94	.416	40½	37‍–‍43	30‍–‍51
Houston Astros	64	97	.398	43½	37‍–‍44	27‍–‍53

=== Record vs. opponents ===
1975 National League record Sources:
Team	ATL	CHC	CIN	HOU	LAD	MON	NYM	PHI	PIT	SD	SF	STL
Atlanta	—	5–7	3–15	12–6	8–10	8–4	4–8	5–7	4–8	7–11	8–9	3–9
Chicago	7–5	—	1–11	7–5	5–7	9–9	7–11	12–6	6–12	5–7	5–7	11–7
Cincinnati	15–3	11–1	—	13–5	8–10	8–4	8–4	7–5	6–6	11–7	13–5	8–4
Houston	6–12	5–7	5–13	—	6–12	8–4	4–8	6–6	6–5	9–9	5–13	4–8–1
Los Angeles	10–8	7–5	10–8	12–6	—	5–7	6–6	7–5	5–7	11–7	10–8	5–7
Montreal	4–8	9–9	4–8	4–8	7–5	—	10–8	7–11	7–11	7–5	5–7	11–7
New York	8–4	11–7	4–8	8–4	6–6	8–10	—	7–11	5–13	8–4	8–4	9–9
Philadelphia	7-5	6–12	5–7	6–6	5–7	11–7	11–7	—	11–7	7–5	7–5	10–8
Pittsburgh	8–4	12–6	6–6	5–6	7–5	11–7	13–5	7–11	—	8–4	5–7	10–8
San Diego	11–7	7–5	7–11	9–9	7–11	5–7	4–8	5–7	4–8	—	8–10	4–8
San Francisco	9–8	7–5	5–13	13–5	8–10	7–5	4–8	5–7	7–5	10–8	—	5–7
St. Louis	9–3	7–11	4–8	8–4–1	7–5	7–11	9–9	8–10	8–10	8–4	7–5	—

=== Opening Day starters ===
- Jim Barr
- Garry Maddox
- Gary Matthews
- Bobby Murcer
- Steve Ontiveros
- Dave Rader
- Chris Speier
- Derrel Thomas
- Gary Thomasson

=== Notable transactions ===
- April 3, 1975: Chuck Hartenstein was released by the Giants.
- May 4, 1975: Garry Maddox was traded by the Giants to the Philadelphia Phillies for Willie Montañez.

=== Roster ===
1975 San Francisco Giants
Roster
Pitchers: 33 Jim Barr; 40 Tom Bradley; 37 Mike Caldwell; 34 John D'Acquisto; 25 Rob Dressler; 56 Pete Falcone; 28 Ed Halicki; 60 Dave Heaverlo; 46 Gary Lavelle; 41 Greg Minton; 17 Randy Moffitt; 26 John Montefusco; 40 Tommy Toms; 41 Don Rose; 49 Charlie Williams	Catchers: 58 Gary Alexander; 2 Marc Hill; 14 Dave Rader; 3 Mike Sadek; Infielders: 15 Chris Arnold; 21 Ed Goodson; 10 Johnnie LeMaster; 29 Bruce Miller; 22 Willie Montañez; 16 Steve Ontiveros; 10 Mike Phillips; 18 Craig Robinson; 35 Chris Speier; 30 Derrel Thomas	Outfielders: 43 Glenn Adams; 32 Jake Brown; 15 Jack Clark; 19 Von Joshua; 31 Garry Maddox; 36 Gary Matthews; 20 Bobby Murcer; 38 Horace Speed; 12 Gary Thomasson	Manager: 9 Wes Westrum; Coaches: 5 Joey Amalfitano; 8 Andy Gilbert; 47 Don McMahon; 1 Ozzie Virgil

== Player stats ==
= Indicates team leader

=== Batting ===
==== Starters by position ====
Note: Pos = Position; G = Games played; AB = At bats; H = Hits; Avg. = Batting average; HR = Home runs; RBI = Runs batted in

Pos	Player	G	AB	H	Avg.	HR	RBI
C	Dave Rader	98	292	85	.291	5	31
1B	Willie Montañez	135	518	158	.305	8	85
2B	Derrel Thomas	144	540	149	.276	6	48
SS	Chris Speier	141	487	132	.271	10	69
3B	Steve Ontiveros	108	325	94	.289	3	31
LF	Gary Matthews	116	425	119	.280	12	58
CF	Von Joshua	129	507	161	.318	7	43
RF	Bobby Murcer	147	526	157	.298	11	91

==== Other batters ====
Note: G = Games played; AB = At bats; H = Hits; Avg. = Batting average; HR = Home runs; RBI = Runs batted in

Player	G	AB	H	Avg.	HR	RBI
Gary Thomasson	114	326	74	.227	7	32
Bruce Miller	99	309	74	.239	1	31
Marc Hill	72	182	39	.214	5	23
Ed Goodson	39	121	25	.207	1	8
Mike Sadek	42	106	25	.236	0	9
Glenn Adams	61	90	27	.300	4	15
Johnnie LeMaster	22	74	14	.189	2	9
Garry Maddox	17	52	7	.135	1	4
Jake Brown	41	43	9	.209	0	4
Chris Arnold	29	41	8	.195	0	0
Mike Phillips	10	31	6	.194	0	1
Craig Robinson	29	29	2	.069	0	0
Jack Clark	8	17	4	.235	0	2
Horace Speed	17	15	2	.133	0	1
Gary Alexander	3	3	0	.000	0	0

=== Pitching ===
==== Starting pitchers ====
Note: G = Games pitched; IP = Innings pitched; W = Wins; L = Losses; ERA = Earned run average; SO = Strikeouts

Player	G	IP	W	L	ERA	SO
Jim Barr	35	244.0	13	14	3.06	77
John Montefusco	35	243.2	15	9	2.88	215
Pete Falcone	34	190.0	12	11	4.17	131
Ed Halicki	24	159.2	9	13	3.49	153

==== Other pitchers ====
Note: G = Games pitched; IP = Innings pitched; W = Wins; L = Losses; ERA = Earned run average; SO = Strikeouts

Player	G	IP	W	L	ERA	SO
Mike Caldwell	38	163.1	7	13	4.79	57
Tom Bradley	13	42.0	2	3	6.21	13
John D'Acquisto	10	28.0	2	4	10.29	22
Greg Minton	4	17.0	1	1	6.88	6
Rob Dressler	3	16.1	1	0	1.10	6

==== Relief pitchers ====
Note: G = Games pitched; W = Wins; L = Losses; SV = Saves; ERA = Earned run average; SO = Strikeouts

Player	G	W	L	SV	ERA	SO
Randy Moffitt	55	4	5	11	3.89	39
Gary Lavelle	65	6	3	8	2.95	51
Charlie Williams	55	5	3	3	3.49	45
Dave Heaverlo	42	3	1	1	2.39	35
Tommy Toms	7	0	1	0	6.10	6

== Awards and honors ==
All-Star Game

== Farm system ==
Level	Team	League	Manager
AAA	Phoenix Giants	Pacific Coast League	Rocky Bridges
AA	Lafayette Drillers	Texas League	Dennis Sommers
A	Fresno Giants	California League	John VanOrnum
A	Cedar Rapids Giants	Midwest League	Bob Hartsfield
Rookie	Great Falls Giants	Pioneer League	Ernie Rodriguez

LEAGUE CHAMPIONS: Great Falls; LEAGUE CO-CHAMPIONS: Lafayette
