= 1977 San Francisco Giants season =

1977 San Francisco Giants
- League: National League
- Division: West
- Ballpark: Candlestick Park
- City: San Francisco, California
- Owners: Bob Lurie
- General managers: Spec Richardson
- Managers: Joe Altobelli
- Television: KTVU (Lon Simmons, Gary Park)
- Radio: KSFO (Lon Simmons, Joe Angel)

The 1977 San Francisco Giants season was the Giants' 95th season in Major League Baseball, their 20th season in San Francisco since their move from New York following the 1957 season, and their 18th at Candlestick Park. The team finished in fourth place in the National League West with a 75–87 record, 23 games behind the Los Angeles Dodgers.

== Offseason ==
- October 20, 1976: Mike Caldwell, Dave Rader and John D'Acquisto were traded by the Giants to the St. Louis Cardinals for Willie Crawford, John Curtis and Vic Harris.
- December 7, 1976: Jeff Yurak was drafted from the Giants by the Milwaukee Brewers in the 1976 minor league draft.
- January 11, 1977: Bud Black was drafted by the Giants in the 3rd round of the 1977 Major League Baseball draft, but did not sign.
- February 11, 1977: Bobby Murcer, Steve Ontiveros, and Andy Muhlstock (minors) were traded by the Giants to the Chicago Cubs for Bill Madlock and Rob Sperring.
- March 26, 1977: Willie Crawford and Rob Sperring were traded by the Giants to the Houston Astros for Rob Andrews and cash.
- March 26, 1977: Chris Bourjos was signed as an amateur free agent by the Giants.
- March 31, 1977: Ken Rudolph was purchased by the Giants from the St. Louis Cardinals.

== Regular season ==
=== Season standings ===
NL West
Team	W	L	Pct.	GB	Home	Road
Los Angeles Dodgers	98	64	.605	—	51‍–‍30	47‍–‍34
Cincinnati Reds	88	74	.543	10	48‍–‍33	40‍–‍41
Houston Astros	81	81	.500	17	46‍–‍35	35‍–‍46
San Francisco Giants	75	87	.463	23	38‍–‍43	37‍–‍44
San Diego Padres	69	93	.426	29	35‍–‍46	34‍–‍47
Atlanta Braves	61	101	.377	37	40‍–‍41	21‍–‍60

=== Record vs. opponents ===
1977 National League record Sources:
Team	ATL	CHC	CIN	HOU	LAD	MON	NYM	PHI	PIT	SD	SF	STL
Atlanta	—	5–7	4–14	9–9	5–13	6–6	7–5	2–10	3–9	11–7	8–10	1–11
Chicago	7–5	—	7–5	6–6	6–6	10–8	9–9	6–12	7–11	7–5	9–3	7–11
Cincinnati	14–4	5–7	—	5–13	10–8	7–5	10–2	8–4	3–9	11–7	10–8	5–7
Houston	9–9	6–6	13–5	—	9–9	8–4	6–6	4–8	4–8	8–10	9–9	5–7
Los Angeles	13–5	6–6	8–10	9–9	—	7–5	8–4	6–6	9–3	12–6	14–4	6–6
Montreal	6–6	8–10	5–7	4–8	5–7	—	10–8	7–11	7–11	5–7	6–6	12–6
New York	5–7	9–9	2–10	6–6	4–8	8–10	—	5–13	4–14	6–6	7–5	8–10
Philadelphia	10-2	12–6	4–8	8–4	6–6	11–7	13–5	—	8–10	9–3	9–3	11–7
Pittsburgh	9–3	11–7	9–3	8–4	3–9	11–7	14–4	10–8	—	10–2	2–10	9–9
San Diego	7–11	5–7	7–11	10–8	6–12	7–5	6–6	3–9	2–10	—	8–10	8–4
San Francisco	10–8	3–9	8–10	9–9	4–14	6–6	5–7	3–9	10–2	10–8	—	7–5
St. Louis	11–1	11–7	7–5	7–5	6–6	6–12	10–8	7–11	9–9	4–8	5–7	—

=== Opening Day starters ===
Opening Day Starters
#	Name	Position
12	Gary Thomasson	CF
21	Rob Andrews	2B
18	Bill Madlock	3B
41	Darrell Evans	LF
44	Willie McCovey	1B
45	Terry Whitfield	RF
35	Chris Speier	SS
2	Marc Hill	C
26	John Montefusco	P

=== Notable transactions ===
- May 19, 1977: DeWayne Buice was signed as an amateur free agent by the Giants.
- June 7, 1977: Chili Davis was drafted by the Giants in the 11th round of the 1977 Major League Baseball draft. Player signed September 3, 1977.
- July 27, 1977: Ken Rudolph was purchased from the Giants by the Baltimore Orioles.
- August 11, 1977: Gorman Heimueller was signed as an amateur free agent by the Giants.

=== Roster ===
1977 San Francisco Giants
Roster
Pitchers: 33 Jim Barr; 34 Terry Cornutt; 40 John Curtis; 28 Ed Halicki; 60 Dave Heaverlo; 39 Bob Knepper; 46 Gary Lavelle; 47 Lynn McGlothen; 38 Greg Minton; 17 Randy Moffitt; 26 John Montefusco; 51 Tommy Toms; 49 Charlie Williams	Catchers: 42 Gary Alexander; 2 Marc Hill; 14 Ken Rudolph; 3 Mike Sadek; Infielders: 21 Rob Andrews; 19,36 Tim Foli; 20 Vic Harris; 36 Skip James; 10 Johnnie LeMaster; 18 Bill Madlock; 44 Willie McCovey; 35 Chris Speier	Outfielders: 22 Jack Clark; 16 Randy Elliott; 41 Darrell Evans; 31 Larry Herndon; 30 Derrel Thomas; 12 Gary Thomasson; 45 Terry Whitfield; Other batters: 32 Tom Heintzelman	Manager: 6 Joe Altobelli; Coaches: 9 Jim Davenport; 8 Tom Haller; 23 Herm Starrette; 5 Bobby Winkles

== Player stats ==
= Indicates team leader

=== Batting ===
==== Starters by position ====
Note: Pos = Position; G = Games played; AB = At bats; H = Hits; Avg. = Batting average; HR = Home runs; RBI = Runs batted in

Pos	Player	G	AB	H	Avg.	HR	RBI
C	Marc Hill	108	320	80	.250	9	50
1B	Willie McCovey	141	478	134	.280	28	86
2B	Rob Andrews	127	436	115	.264	0	25
3B	Bill Madlock	140	533	161	.302	12	46
SS	Tim Foli	104	368	84	.228	4	27
LF	Darrell Evans	144	461	117	.254	17	72
CF	Derrel Thomas	148	506	135	.267	8	44
RF	Jack Clark	136	413	104	.252	13	51

==== Other batters ====
Note: G = Games played; AB = At bats; H = Hits; Avg. = Batting average; HR = Home runs; RBI = Runs batted in

Player	G	AB	H	Avg.	HR	RBI
Gary Thomasson	146	446	114	.256	17	71
Terry Whitfield	114	326	93	.285	7	36
Randy Elliott	73	167	40	.240	7	26
Vic Harris	69	165	43	.261	2	14
Johnny LeMaster	68	134	20	.149	0	8
Mike Sadek	61	126	29	.230	1	15
Gary Alexander	51	119	36	.303	5	20
Larry Herndon	49	109	26	.239	1	5
Chris Speier	6	17	3	.176	0	0
Ken Rudolph	11	15	3	.200	0	0
Skip James	10	15	4	.267	0	3
Tom Heintzelman	2	2	0	.000	0	0

=== Pitching ===
==== Starting pitchers ====
Note: G = Games pitched; IP = Innings pitched; W = Wins; L = Losses; ERA = Earned run average; SO = Strikeouts

Player	G	IP	W	L	ERA	SO
Ed Halicki	37	257.2	16	12	3.32	168
Jim Barr	38	234.1	12	16	4.76	97
Bob Knepper	27	166.0	11	9	3.36	100
John Montefusco	26	157.1	7	12	3.49	110
Greg Minton	2	14.0	1	1	4.50	5

==== Other pitchers ====
Note: G = Games pitched; IP = Innings pitched; W = Wins; L = Losses; ERA = Earned run average; SO = Strikeouts

Player	G	IP	W	L	ERA	SO
Charlie Williams	55	119.1	6	5	4.00	41
Lynn McGlothen	21	80.0	2	9	5.63	42
John Curtis	43	77.0	3	3	5.49	47

==== Relief pitchers ====
Note: G = Games pitched; W = Wins; L = Losses; SV = Saves; ERA = Earned run average; SO = Strikeouts

Player	G	W	L	SV	ERA	SO
Gary Lavelle	73	7	7	20	2.05	93
Randy Moffitt	64	4	9	11	3.59	68
Dave Heaverlo	56	5	1	1	2.55	58
Terry Cornutt	28	1	2	0	3.86	23
Tommy Toms	4	0	1	0	2.08	2

== Awards and honors ==
- Willie McCovey, Hutch Award

=== All-Stars ===
All-Star Game

- Gary Lavelle, Pitcher, Reserve

== Farm system ==
Level	Team	League	Manager
AAA	Phoenix Giants	Pacific Coast League	Rocky Bridges
AA	Waterbury Giants	Eastern League	Andy Gilbert
A	Fresno Giants	California League	John VanOrnum
A	Cedar Rapids Giants	Midwest League	Jack Mull
Rookie	Great Falls Giants	Pioneer League	Ernie Rodriguez

LEAGUE CHAMPIONS: Phoenix
