= 1978 St. Louis Cardinals season =

Major League Baseball season

1978 St. Louis Cardinals
- League: National League
- Division: East
- Ballpark: Busch Memorial Stadium
- City: St. Louis, Missouri
- Record: 69–93 (.426)
- Divisional place: 5th
- Owners: August "Gussie" Busch
- General managers: Bing Devine
- Managers: Vern Rapp, Jack Krol, Ken Boyer
- Television: KSD-TV (Jack Buck, Mike Shannon, Jay Randolph, Bob Starr)
- Radio: KMOX (Jack Buck, Mike Shannon, Bob Starr)

The 1978 St. Louis Cardinals season was the team's 97th season in St. Louis, Missouri and its 87th season in the National League. The Cardinals went 69–93 during the season and finished fifth in the National League East, 21 games behind the Philadelphia Phillies.

== Offseason ==
- October 25, 1977: The Cardinals traded a player to be named later to the San Francisco Giants for Frank Riccelli. The Cardinals completed the deal by sending Jim Dwyer to the Giants on June 15, 1978.
- December 8, 1977: Dave Rader and Héctor Cruz were traded by the Cardinals to the Chicago Cubs for Jerry Morales, Steve Swisher, and cash.
- February 2, 1978: Ken Rudolph was signed as a free agent by the Cardinals.
- March 15, 1978: Rick Bosetti was traded by the Cardinals to the Toronto Blue Jays for Tom Bruno and cash.

== Regular season ==
In late April, the Cardinals fired manager Vern Rapp, who had started at 7–11. He was briefly replaced by coach Jack Krol for two games (1-1) before giving the job on a permanent basis to their former MVP third-baseman Ken Boyer, who went 61–81 the rest of the way.

On June 16, Tom Seaver of the Cincinnati Reds made history by pitching a no-hitter against the Cardinals. It would be the only no-hitter of his career.

First baseman Keith Hernandez won a Gold Glove.

This remains to date the only 162-game season in which the Cardinals failed to win at least 70 games.

=== Season standings ===
NL East
Team	W	L	Pct.	GB	Home	Road
Philadelphia Phillies	90	72	.556	—	54‍–‍28	36‍–‍44
Pittsburgh Pirates	88	73	.547	1½	55‍–‍26	33‍–‍47
Chicago Cubs	79	83	.488	11	44‍–‍38	35‍–‍45
Montreal Expos	76	86	.469	14	41‍–‍39	35‍–‍47
St. Louis Cardinals	69	93	.426	21	37‍–‍44	32‍–‍49
New York Mets	66	96	.407	24	33‍–‍47	33‍–‍49

=== Record vs. opponents ===
1978 National League record Sources:
Team	ATL	CHC	CIN	HOU	LAD	MON	NYM	PHI	PIT	SD	SF	STL
Atlanta	—	5–7	6–12	8–10	5–13	5–7	6–6	8–4	2–10	8–10	11–7	5–7
Chicago	7–5	—	7–5	6–6	4–8	7–11	11–7	4–14	7–11	7–5	4–8	15–3
Cincinnati	12–6	5–7	—	11–7	9–9	8–4	7–5	7–5	4–7	9–9	12–6	8–4
Houston	10–8	6–6	7–11	—	7–11	6–6	7–5	6–6	4–8	8–10	6–12	7–5
Los Angeles	13–5	8–4	9–9	11–7	—	8–4	7–5	7–5	7–5	9–9	11–7	5–7
Montreal	7–5	11–7	4–8	6–6	4–8	—	8–10	9–9	7–11	6–6	5–7	9–9
New York	6–6	7–11	5–7	5–7	5–7	10–8	—	6–12	7–11	5–7	3–9	7–11
Philadelphia	4-8	14–4	5–7	6–6	5–7	9–9	12–6	—	11–7	8–4	6–6	10–8
Pittsburgh	10–2	11–7	7–4	8–4	5–7	11–7	11–7	7–11	—	5–7	4–8	9–9
San Diego	10–8	5–7	9–9	10–8	9–9	6–6	7–5	4–8	7–5	—	8–10	9–3
San Francisco	7–11	8–4	6–12	12–6	7–11	7–5	9–3	6–6	8–4	10–8	—	9–3
St. Louis	7–5	3–15	4–8	5–7	7–5	9–9	11–7	8–10	9–9	3–9	3–9	—

=== Opening Day starters ===
- Lou Brock
- John Denny
- Keith Hernandez
- Jerry Morales
- Ken Reitz
- Tony Scott
- Ted Simmons
- Garry Templeton
- Mike Tyson

=== Notable transactions ===
- May 26, 1978: Eric Rasmussen was traded by the Cardinals to the San Diego Padres for George Hendrick.
- June 8, 1978: Frank Riccelli was traded by the Cardinals to the Houston Astros for Bob Coluccio.
- July 18, 1978: John Tamargo was traded by the Cardinals to the San Francisco Giants for a player to be named later. The Giants completed the deal by sending Rob Dressler to the Cardinals on July 24.

=== Roster ===
1978 St. Louis Cardinals
Roster
Pitchers: 49 Tom Bruno; 36 John Denny; 26 Rob Dressler; 41 Pete Falcone; 31 Bob Forsch; 43,49 George Frazier; 26 Dave Hamilton; 32 Mark Littell; 39 Aurelio López; 35 Silvio Martínez; 34 Dan O'Brien; 42 Eric Rasmussen; 22 Buddy Schultz; 42 Roy Thomas; 38 John Urrea; 46 Pete Vuckovich	Catchers: 16 Terry Kennedy; 23 Ted Simmons; 2 Steve Swisher; 12 John Tamargo; Infielders: 7 Roger Freed; 11 Wayne Garrett; 37 Keith Hernandez; 24 Ken Oberkfell; 5 Mike Phillips; 33 Mike Ramsey; 44 Ken Reitz; 21 Gary Sutherland; 1 Garry Templeton; 10 Mike Tyson	Outfielders: 20 Lou Brock; 21 Bob Coluccio; 11 Jim Dwyer; 27 George Hendrick; 19 Dane Iorg; 21 Jim Lentine; 25 Jerry Morales; 29 Jerry Mumphrey; 30 Tony Scott	Manager: 14 Ken Boyer; 8 Jack Krol; 9 Vern Rapp; Coaches: 8 Jack Krol; 4 Mo Mozzali; 18 Claude Osteen; 14 Dave Ricketts; 3 Sonny Ruberto

== Player stats ==
=== Batting ===
==== Starters by position ====
Note: Pos = Position; G = Games played; AB = At bats; H = Hits; Avg. = Batting average; HR = Home runs; RBI = Runs batted in

Pos	Player	G	AB	H	Avg.	HR	RBI
C	Ted Simmons	152	516	148	.287	22	80
1B	Keith Hernandez	159	542	138	.255	11	64
2B	Mike Tyson	125	377	88	.233	3	26
SS	Garry Templeton	155	647	181	.280	2	47
3B	Ken Reitz	150	540	133	.246	10	75
LF	Lou Brock	92	298	66	.221	0	12
CF	George Hendrick	102	382	110	.288	17	67
RF	Jerry Morales	130	457	109	.239	4	46

==== Other batters ====
Note: G = Games played; AB = At bats; H = Hits; Avg. = Batting average; HR = Home runs; RBI = Runs batted in

Player	G	AB	H	Avg.	HR	RBI
Jerry Mumphrey	125	367	96	.262	2	37
Tony Scott	96	219	50	.228	1	14
Mike Phillips	76	164	44	.268	1	28
Steve Swisher	45	115	32	.278	1	10
Roger Freed	52	92	22	.239	2	20
Dane Iorg	35	85	23	.271	0	4
Jim Dwyer	34	65	14	.215	1	4
Wayne Garrett	33	63	21	.333	1	10
Ken Oberkfell	24	50	6	.120	0	0
Terry Kennedy	10	29	5	.172	0	2
Jim Lentine	8	11	2	.182	0	1
Gary Sutherland	10	6	1	.167	0	0
John Tamargo	6	6	0	.000	0	0
Mike Ramsey	12	5	1	.200	0	0
Bob Coluccio	5	3	0	.000	0	0

=== Pitching ===
==== Starting pitchers ====
Note: G = Games pitched; IP = Innings pitched; W = Wins; L = Losses; ERA = Earned run average; SO = Strikeouts

Player	G	IP	W	L	ERA	SO
John Denny	33	234.0	14	11	2.96	103
Bob Forsch	34	233.2	11	17	3.70	114
Silvio Martínez	22	138.1	9	8	3.64	45
Pete Falcone	19	75.0	2	7	5.76	28
Eric Rasmussen	10	60.1	2	5	4.18	32

==== Other pitchers ====
Note: G = Games pitched; IP = Innings pitched; W = Wins; L = Losses; ERA = Earned run average; SO = Strikeouts

Player	G	IP	W	L	ERA	SO
Pete Vuckovich	45	198.1	12	12	2.54	149
John Urrea	27	98.2	4	9	5.38	61
Aurelio López	25	65.0	4	2	4.29	46
Tom Bruno	18	49.2	4	3	1.99	33
Dan O'Brien	7	18.0	0	2	4.50	12
Rob Dressler	3	13.0	0	1	2.08	4

==== Relief pitchers ====
Note: G = Games pitched; W = Wins; L = Losses; SV = Saves; ERA = Earned run average; SO = Strikeouts

Player	G	W	L	SV	ERA	SO
Mark Littell	72	4	8	11	2.79	130
Buddy Schultz	62	2	4	6	3.80	70
Roy Thomas	16	1	1	3	3.81	16
George Frazier	14	0	3	0	4.09	8
Dave Hamilton	13	0	0	0	6.43	8

== Awards and records ==
=== League leaders ===
- Garry Templeton, National League leader, Triples

== Farm system ==
Level	Team	League	Manager
AAA	Springfield Redbirds	American Association	Jimy Williams
AA	Arkansas Travelers	Texas League	Tommy Thompson
A	St. Petersburg Cardinals	Florida State League	Hal Lanier
A	Gastonia Cardinals	Western Carolinas League	Buzzy Keller
Rookie	Johnson City Cardinals	Appalachian League	Nick Leyva
Rookie	Calgary Cardinals	Pioneer League	Johnny Lewis
