= Mo Mozzali =

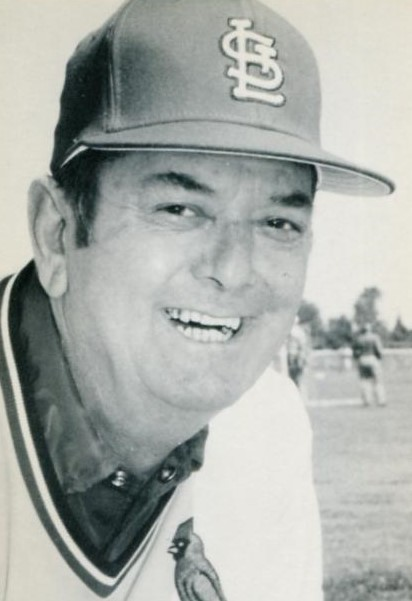
- Coach
- Born: December 22, 1922; Louisville, Kentucky, U.S.
- Died: March 2, 1987 (aged 64); Lakeland, Florida, U.S.
- Batted: Left Threw: Left

Teams
- St. Louis Cardinals (1977–1978)

Maurice Joseph "Mo" Mozzali (December 12, 1922 – March 2, 1987) was an American professional baseball outfielder, scout and coach. Born in Louisville, Kentucky, Mozzali threw and batted left-handed, stood 5 feet 10 inches (1.78 m) tall and weighed 158 pounds (72 kg).

Mozzali played all but one full season of his 12-year (1946–1948; 1950–1958) career in the St. Louis Cardinals' organization. The year he did not, 1947, was spent in the New York Giants' system with the Minneapolis Millers. Although he never reached Major League Baseball as a player, he was a fixture at the Triple-A level as a member of the Columbus Red Birds and the Omaha Cardinals of the American Association.

Mozzali also spent time in the Venezuelan Professional Baseball League. A huge favorite of local fans, he was a member of the Cervecería and Leones clubs in three seasons spanning 1951–1955, before joining the Industriales de Valencia in the 1956–57 campaign. During those four seasons, he posted a .315 batting average with 86 runs and 74 run batted in in 156 games, clubbing 185 hits, 38 doubles, five triples, three home runs, and 10 stolen bases. He also played with Caracas in the 1952 Caribbean Series, batting .240 (6-for-25) with five runs and two RBIs.

After spending one season as the playing manager of the Albany Cardinals of the Georgia–Florida League, Mozalli retired from the field. He batted .298 with 80 home runs in 1,463 minor league games.

Mozzali then became a scout for the Cardinals, serving from 1959 through 1976. He spent the 1977 and 1978 seasons as a member of the big-league Cardinals' coaching staff, during the managerial tenures of Vern Rapp and Ken Boyer. He then resumed his former job as a Redbird scout.

Mozzali died in Lakeland, Florida, at the age of 64.

== See also ==
- List of St. Louis Cardinals coaches
