= Snitker =

Snitker is a surname of German origin. Notable people with the surname include:

- Alexander Snitker (born 1975), American politician
- Brian Snitker (born 1955), American baseball player, coach, and manager
- Troy Snitker (born 1988), American baseball player and coach
