= 1969 Amateur World Series =

Tournament details
- Country: Dominican Republic
- Teams: 11
- Defending champions: Colombia

Final positions
- Champions: Cuba
- Runners-up: United States
- Third place: Dominican Republic
- Fourth place: Venezuela

Awards
- MVP: (Cuba) Gaspar Pérez

The 1969 Amateur World Series was the 17th edition of the Amateur World Series international baseball tournament. It was held, for the first time, in Santo Domingo, Dominican Republic, from August 15 through August 26, 1969. The competition marked the first time the United States participated in the Amateur World Series since the 1942 tournament.

Cuba and the US were both 9-0 when they met in the finals, with Cuba winning 2–1. Gaspar Pérez was the winning pitcher for Cuba and also drove in their first run to tie the game and scored the second, decisive run. Most of the 20,000 fans who watched the finals were pro-Cuba, reportedly due to lingering resentment from the 1965 US invasion of the Dominican Republic.

== Participants ==
The 1969 edition of the Amateur World Series would be a watershed for international competition, as it saw the return of two powerhouses, the United States and Cuba. The United States, which had not participated in the tournament since withdrawing from the 1942 edition, returned after a 27-year absence. After their victory in the 1967 Pan American Games in Winnipeg, Canada had spurred renewed interest in international competitions, William P. "Dutch" Fehring, president of the rejuvenated United States Baseball Federation (USBF), decided to actively participate in International Baseball Federation (FIBA) competitions. The participation of the U.S. was fraught with political tensions; the U.S. military occupation of the Dominican Republic had occurred just four years earlier. the

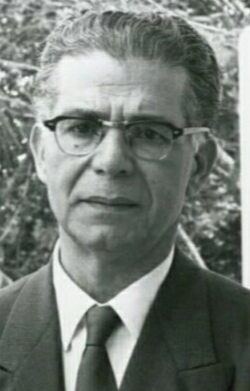
Joaquín Balaguer used the tournament for propaganda purposes

Cuba returned after being absent for the 1965 tournament in Colombia, which it was unable to attend due to visa issues brought on by the Cold War. Dominican authorities were active to ensure that political protests did not derail the event, detaining several protesters. Nevertheless, historians suggest that Dominican President Joaquín Balaguer used the event as propaganda, as a means of legitimizing his rule and positioning the Dominican Republic as an international actor friendly to both the capitalist U.S. and communist Cuba.

Venezuela, which had also not attended in 1965, also made its return.

== Venue ==
Santo Domingo, Dominican Republic	Estadio Quisqueya is located in the Dominican Republic
Estadio Quisqueya	Estadio Quisqueya is located in the Dominican Republic
Capacity: 18,000	Estadio Quisqueya is located in the Dominican Republic

The tournament, eventually realized in the Dominican Republic, was initially slated to take place in Colombia, which had hosted the 1965 Amateur World Series, in February 1969. However, these plans were abruptly cancelled in December 1968 due to a dispute between the Colombian Baseball Federation and the central government. On April 30, 1969, it was announced that the tournament had been rescheduled for the Dominican Republic.

== Results ==
The group stage featured a round robin format to determine the medal winners.

Pos	Team	Pld	W	L	RF	RA	RD	PCT	GB	CUB	USA	DOM	VEN	NCA	PAN	PUR	COL	MEX	GUA	AHO
1	Cuba	10	10	0	91	13	+78	1.000	—		2–1	10–3	9–0	10–1	8–0	9–1	9–3	5–3	17–0	12–1
2	United States	10	9	1	72	13	+59	.900	1	1–2		10–0	4–0	8–0	7–2	5–3	12–6	4–0	15–0	6–0
3	Dominican Republic (H)	9	7	2	50	33	+17	.778	2.5	0–10	3–10		5–3	1–0	16–1	7–3	3–2	(Note: Not played)	7–2	8–2
4	Venezuela	10	7	3	61	35	+26	.700	3	0–4	0–9	3–5		16–4	12–5	6–5	2–1	4–2	9–0	9–0
5	Nicaragua	10	4	6	33	67	−34	.400	6	0–8	1–10	0–1	4–16		8–7	11–9	0–1	0–10	6–3	3–2
6	Panama	10	4	6	47	65	−18	.400	6	2–7	0–8	1–16	5–12	7–8		7–2	7–2	2–4	8–3	8–3
7	Puerto Rico	10	4	6	53	54	−1	.400	6	3–5	1–9	3–7	5–6	9–11	2–7		7–0	9–1	7–4	7–4
8	Colombia	10	4	6	39	47	−8	.400	6	6–12	3–9	2–3	1–2	1–0	2–7	0–7		5–4	11–1	8–2
9	Mexico	9	2	7	28	38	−10	.222	7.5	0–4	3–5	(Note: Not played)	2–4	10–0	4–2	1–9	4–5		0–1	4–8
10	Guatemala	9	1	8	14	80	−66	.111	8.5	0–15	0–17	2–7	0–9	3–6	3–8	4–7	1–11	1–0		(Note: Not played)
11	Netherlands Antilles	9	1	8	22	65	−43	.111	8.5	0–6	1–12	2–8	0–9	2–3	3–8	4–7	2–8	8–4	(Note: Not played)	

Source: Baseball.ch (archived)
(H) Hosts

== Tournament summary ==
The last two encounters between the two sides, at the 1967 Pan American Games in Winnipeg and the 1968 International Amateur Tournament in Mexico City, had seen the U.S. defeat Cuba.

== Final standings ==
Pos.	Team	W	L
1st place, gold medalist(s)	Cuba	10	0
2nd place, silver medalist(s)	United States	9	1
3rd place, bronze medalist(s)	Dominican Republic	7	2
4	Venezuela	7	3
5	Nicaragua	4	6
5	Panama	4	6
5	Puerto Rico	4	6
5	Colombia	4	6
9	Mexico	2	7
10	Guatemala	1	8
10	Netherlands Antilles	1	8

== Honors and awards ==
=== Statistical leaders ===
Batting leaders
Statistic	Name	Total
Batting average	(Cuba) Owen Blandino	.371
Hits	(Cuba) Owen Blandino	20
Runs	(Cuba) Owen Blandino	13
Home runs	(Cuba) Fermín Laffita	3
Runs batted in	(Cuba) Fermín Laffita	16
Stolen bases	(Venezuela) Carlos Urriola	5

Pitching leaders
Statistic	Name	Total
Wins	(Cuba) Gaspar Pérez	4
Earned run average	(Dominican Republic) Gustavo Rodríguez	0.00

=== Awards ===
Award	Player	Ref.
Most Valuable Player	(Cuba) Gaspar Pérez	
