= Arch Moore =

Arch Moore may refer to:

- Archie Moore (1913–1998), light heavyweight world boxing champion
- Archie Moore (baseball) (born 1941), former Major League Baseball player
- Arch A. Moore Jr. (1923–2015), governor of West Virginia
