= Tim Plodinec =

American baseball player (born 1947)

- Pitcher
- Born: January 27, 1947 (age 78); Aliquippa, Pennsylvania, U.S.
- Batted: Right Threw: Right

MLB debut
- June 2, 1972, for the St. Louis Cardinals

Last MLB appearance
- June 2, 1972, for the St. Louis Cardinals

MLB statistics
- Pitching Record: 0–0
- Earned run average: 27.00
- Strikeouts: 0
- Stats at Baseball Reference

Teams
- St. Louis Cardinals (1972)
Medals
Men's baseball
Representing United States
Pan American Games
Gold medal – first place	1967 Winnipeg	Team

Timothy Alfred Plodinec (born January 27, 1947) is an American former professional baseball player. He appeared in a single game in Major League Baseball (MLB), as a relief pitcher for the St. Louis Cardinals in 1972. Listed at 6 feet 4 inches (1.93 m) and 190 pounds (86 kg), he threw and batted right-handed.

== Biography ==
Plodinec was a member of the United States national baseball team at the 1967 Pan American Games, where the team won the gold medal. As a pitcher for the Arizona Wildcats, Plodinec was named to the 1968 College Baseball All-America Team in June 1968. That month, he was selected by the St. Louis Cardinals in the 33rd round of the 1968 MLB draft.

Plodinec went on to play professionally from 1968 to 1975, primarily in the Cardinals' farm system, appearing in 259 minor-league games while compiling a 45–40 win–loss record and a 3.39 earned run average (ERA). His one appearance in MLB came on June 2, 1972, against the Los Angeles Dodgers—in one-third of an inning in relief, he faced four batters, allowed three singles, and was charged with one earned run.

Following his baseball career, Plodinec was a business executive for the Long John Silver's restaurant chain. In September 2021, Plodinec was inducted to the Sports Hall of Fame at the University of Arizona. In addition to playing college baseball, he also played college football for Arizona, leading the 1965 Wildcats in receiving.
