= International Amateur Baseball Tournament =

Baseball competition held in 1968

Tournament details
- Country: Mexico
- City: Mexico City
- Venue(s): Parque del Seguro Social
- Dates: November 2–10, 1968
- Teams: 4

Final positions
- Champions: United States
- Runners-up: Cuba
- Third place: Mexico
- Fourth place: Puerto Rico

Tournament statistics
- Games played: 12

The International Amateur Baseball Tournament was held in Mexico City in 1968 between four different national baseball teams. The tournament occurred shortly after the 1968 Olympic Games, also in Mexico City, though it was not considered part of the Olympic program. It was billed as the first edition of the tournament, but the format was not continued; future international amateur tournaments, including the following year in Santo Domingo, would continue to bill themselves as the Amateur World Series.

The champion United States team was coached by veteran college coach Danny Litwhiler. It lost only one game, in a ten-inning shutout to Mexico. The U.S. team included several future major leaguers, namely Brent Strom, Larry Gura, Lenny Randle, and Steve Rogers. Other future major leaguers included Puerto Rico's Miguel Fuentes.

== Standings ==
Pos	Team	W	L
1	United States	5	1
2	Cuba	4	2
3	Mexico	2	4
4	Puerto Rico	1	5

== Results ==
November 2, 1968	Cuba	1 – 2	United States	Parque del Seguro Social, Mexico City
November 2, 1968		Boxscore		Parque del Seguro Social, Mexico City

November 3, 1968	Puerto Rico	8 – 21	Cuba	Parque del Seguro Social, Mexico City
November 3, 1968		Boxscore		Parque del Seguro Social, Mexico City

November 3, 1968	United States	0 – 1	Mexico	Parque del Seguro Social, Mexico City
November 3, 1968		Boxscore		Parque del Seguro Social, Mexico City

November 4, 1968	United States	10 – 9	Puerto Rico	Parque del Seguro Social, Mexico City
November 4, 1968		Boxscore		Parque del Seguro Social, Mexico City

November 5, 1968	Mexico	2 – 5	Cuba	Parque del Seguro Social, Mexico City
November 5, 1968		Boxscore		Parque del Seguro Social, Mexico City

November 6, 1968	Puerto Rico	2 – 15	Mexico	Parque del Seguro Social, Mexico City
November 6, 1968		Boxscore		Parque del Seguro Social, Mexico City

November 7, 1968	Cuba	8 – 1	Mexico	Parque del Seguro Social, Mexico City
November 7, 1968		Boxscore		Parque del Seguro Social, Mexico City

November 7, 1968	United States	9 – 2	Puerto Rico	Parque del Seguro Social, Mexico City
November 7, 1968		Boxscore		Parque del Seguro Social, Mexico City

November 8, 1968	Cuba	12 – 4	Puerto Rico	Parque del Seguro Social, Mexico City
November 8, 1968		Boxscore		Parque del Seguro Social, Mexico City

November 9, 1968	United States	9 – 4	Mexico	Parque del Seguro Social, Mexico City
November 9, 1968		Boxscore		Parque del Seguro Social, Mexico City

November 10, 1968	Puerto Rico	2 – 4	Mexico	Parque del Seguro Social, Mexico City
November 10, 1968		Boxscore		Parque del Seguro Social, Mexico City

=== Final ===
November 10, 1968 at Parque del Seguro Social
Team	1	2	3	4	5	6	7	8	9	R	H	E
United States	0	0	0	0	1	0	0	4	0	5	8	1
Cuba	0	1	0	0	0	0	0	0	0	1	6	0
WP: Brent Strom LP: Andres Leaño; Home runs: USA: Gary Sanserino; CUB: None; Boxscore

== See also ==
- Baseball World Cup
- Baseball at the Pan American Games
- WBSC Premier12
