= Jerry Morales =

Puerto Rican baseball player (born 1949)

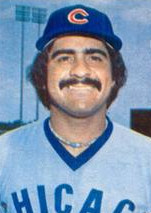
- Morales with the Cubs in 1977
- Outfielder
- Born: February 18, 1949 (age 77); Yabucoa, Puerto Rico
- Batted: Right Threw: Right

MLB debut
- September 5, 1969, for the San Diego Padres

Last MLB appearance
- September 28, 1983, for the Chicago Cubs

MLB statistics
- Batting average: .259
- Home runs: 95
- Runs batted in: 570
- Stats at Baseball Reference

Teams
- As player: San Diego Padres (1969–1973); Chicago Cubs (1974–1977); St. Louis Cardinals (1978); Detroit Tigers (1979); New York Mets (1980); Chicago Cubs (1981–1983); As coach: Montreal Expos (2002–2004); Washington Nationals (2007–2008)

Career highlights and awards
- All-Star (1977)
Medals
Men's baseball
Representing Puerto Rico
Central American and Caribbean Games
Bronze medal – third place	1966 San Juan	Team

Julio Ruben "Jerry" Morales Torres (born February 18, 1949) is a Puerto Rican former Major League Baseball (MLB) outfielder who played from 1969 to 1983.

== Career ==
Morales was initially signed by the New York Mets as an amateur free agent at the age of 17 in 1966. He went to the San Diego Padres in 1968 in that year's expansion draft, and spent several seasons going up and down in the Padres' farm system, finally becoming a semiregular in 1972 and 1973. On November 7, 1973, Morales was traded to the Chicago Cubs for Glenn Beckert and minor league infielder Bobby Fenwick. Morales, who played seven seasons for the Cubs over two stints (1973–1977, 1981–1983) was a consistent and quiet outfielder who played all three outfield positions with above average speed and a good glove. He was known for his unusual "basket catch" style. Unless he was running when he caught a ball, he always made a two-handed basket catch, directly in front of his body, below the belt.

At the time of the Beckert deal, Cubs general manager John Holland believed acquiring Morales was "in line with our movement for youth and speed" (Dozer, 11/13/73). In the same offseason, the Cubs also moved Ferguson Jenkins, and, at the time of this trade, speculation was that by acquiring Morales, Billy Williams would either be moved to first or traded. By trading Jenkins and Beckert, whose salaries totaled over $200,000, the Cubs payroll decreased.

While Morales led the Cubs with 91 RBI during the 1975 season, his most promising season was for the 1977 Cubs. Along with Rick Reuschel, Bruce Sutter, and Manny Trillo, Morales represented the Cubs in the 1977 Major League Baseball All-Star Game at Yankee Stadium, in which Morales was plunked in the knee by Yankee pitcher Sparky Lyle. The hit by pitch, one of 28 in All-Star Game history, a subsequent back injury, and a broken finger from making a catch in center field all shortened the 1977 season for Morales. His injuries contributed to the Cubs decline that season, and Morales never seemed to be the same player.

In the offseason between the 1977 and 1978 season, Cubs general manager Bob Kennedy traded Morales, Steve Swisher, and a player to be named later to the St. Louis Cardinals for Héctor Cruz and catcher Dave Rader. The Cardinals acquired Morales to improve the team's offense.

Morales returned to the Cubs as a free agent before the 1981 season, and made his final appearance for Chicago in 1983.

In a 15-year, 1441 game major league career, Morales compiled a .259 batting average (1173-for-4528) with 516 runs, 95 home runs and 570 RBIs.

== Post-playing career ==
After the 1983 season, Morales immediately began his coaching career by becoming the Cubs roving minor league hitting and outfield instructor; he served in this position through 1986. From 1987 to 1990, he was a scout for the Los Angeles Dodgers. After a twelve-year break from MLB, he became the Montreal Expos first base and outfield coach from 2002 to 2004. In 2006, he was a coach in Puerto Rico and with the Gulf Coast Mets. From 2007 to 2008, he was the first base coach for the Washington Nationals. In February 2009, he was named a coach for the St. Lucie Mets.

As of 2019, Morales was running a baseball camp in Puerto Rico.

== See also ==
- List of Major League Baseball players from Puerto Rico
- List of Puerto Ricans
