= Manuel Alarcón =

Cuban baseball player

Medal record

Men's baseball

Representing Cuba

Pan American Games
Gold medal – first place	1963 São Paulo	Team
Silver medal – second place	1967 Winnipeg	Team

Manuel Alarcón Reina (Note: In this Spanish name, the first or paternal surname is Alarcón and the second or maternal family name is Reina.) (19 February 1941 – 29 May 1998) was a Cuban baseball player.

In 1964–1965, he became the first pitcher in the history of the league to strike out more than 100 batters in a season, striking out 101 in 94.2 innings. On 24 January, in the 1966–1967 season, he threw the third no-hitter in Cuban National Series history. He won the Cuban National Series Most Valuable Pitcher award that season.

== Biography ==
He was born in Bartolomé Masó, Cuba and died in Havana, Cuba. He pitched for the Orientales in the Cuban National Series for seven years in the 1960s. He posted a win-loss record of 41-24 and an ERA of 1.82 ERA in 87 games, 70 of which he started. He also threw 43 complete games and 12 shutouts.

He also pitched in the 1963 Pan American Games and the 1967 Pan American Games.
