= John Tamargo =

American baseball player (born 1951)

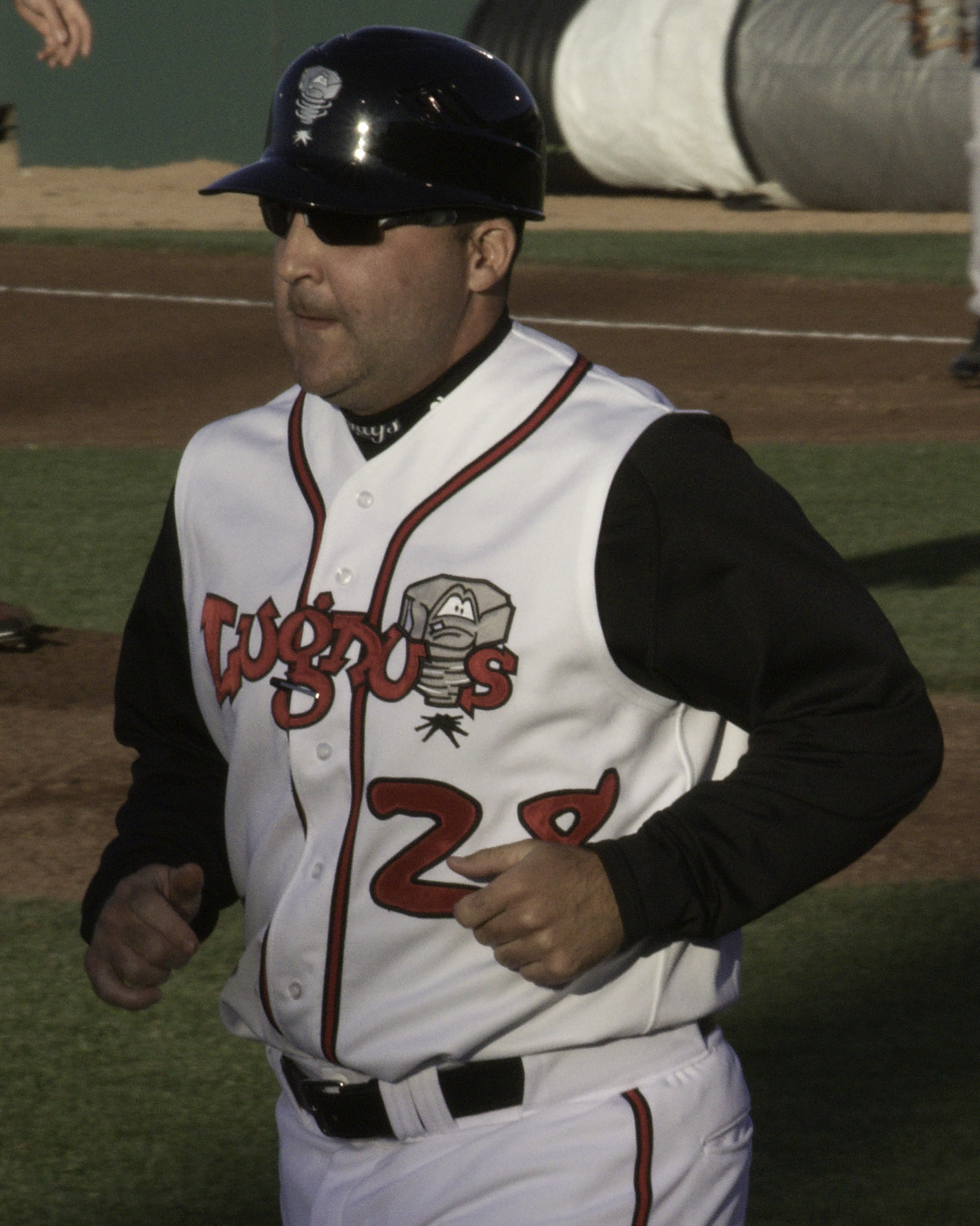
- Tamargo with the Lansing Lugnuts in 2012
- Catcher / Coach
- Born: November 7, 1951 (age 74); Tampa, Florida, U.S.
- Batted: Switch Threw: Right

MLB debut
- September 3, 1976, for the St. Louis Cardinals

Last MLB appearance
- October 5, 1980, for the Montreal Expos

MLB statistics
- Batting average: .242
- Home runs: 4
- Runs batted in: 33
- Stats at Baseball Reference

Teams
- As player: St. Louis Cardinals (1976–1978); San Francisco Giants (1978–1979); Montreal Expos (1979–1980); As coach: Houston Astros (1999–2004)

John Felix Tamargo (born November 7, 1951) is an American former professional baseball catcher, coach, and long-time minor league manager. He played all or part of five seasons in the majors from 1976 until 1980. He currently serves as the Latin America Field Coordinator for the Seattle Mariners organization.

== Playing career ==
Tamargo was drafted out of Tampa Catholic High School by the New York Yankees in 1969, but did not sign, choosing instead to attend Georgia Southern University. He was drafted three more times in the next two years, but did not sign with a team until being drafted by the St. Louis Cardinals in the 6th round of the 1973 Major League Baseball draft. He made his major league debut with the Cardinals on September 3, 1976. He played in just 20 games with St. Louis from 1976 to 1978.

In July, 1978, San Francisco Giants catcher Mike Sadek was injured, and they acquired Tamargo from the Cardinals as a replacement. He spent the rest of the season with the Giants, splitting time with starting catcher Marc Hill. He started the 1979 season with the Giants, but was traded to the Montreal Expos on June 13. He was initially assigned to the minor league Denver Bears, but returned to the majors in August, but appeared in just 12 games over the remainder of the season.

Tamargo spent the entire 1980 season with the Expos, the only full season he spent in the major leagues. Serving as backup to future Hall of Famer Gary Carter, he appeared in 37 games, batting .275. The following season he spent the entire season back with the Bears, his last season as a player.

== Managerial and coaching career ==
Following his playing career, Tamargo has had a lengthy career as a minor league manager, starting in 1982 with the independent Miami Marlins. He then joined the New York Mets organization, for which he worked from 1983 until 1996 in various capacities. In 1994, he managed the Binghamton Mets to the championship of the Eastern League.

In 1997, Tamargo moved the Houston Astros organization, managing the Kissimmee Cobras. The next season, 1998, he won his second championship as a manager with the New Orleans Zephyrs of the Pacific Coast League. From 1999 until 2004, he was a coach for the MLB Houston Astros. In 2005 and 2007, he managed the Brevard County Manatees in the Milwaukee Brewers organization, and in 2006 he managed the Durham Bulls, a farm team of the Tampa Bay Devil Rays.

On January 13, 2009, Tamargo was named the manager of the Everett AquaSox in the Seattle Mariners organization. He was named manager of the Class-A Clinton LumberKings of the Midwest League after the '09 season. During the 2010 season, his son John Jr. served as hitting coach of the Lansing Lugnuts, which played in the same league. The two managed against each other in one game when John Jr. served as the Lugnuts acting manager. His son was promoted to manager of the Lugnuts before the 2012 season, and was named hitting coach of the Dunedin Blue Jays prior to the 2015 season.

In 2026, his son Tamargo Jr. was named manager of the New Hampshire Fisher Cats the Double-A affiliate of the Toronto Blue Jays.

Tamargo was named to his current position as Latin America Field Coordinator after the 2010 season.

Preceded by Steve Swisher	Binghamton Mets Manager; 1994–1996	Succeeded by Rick Sweet
