= Brian Kaplan =

American baseball coach (born 1982)

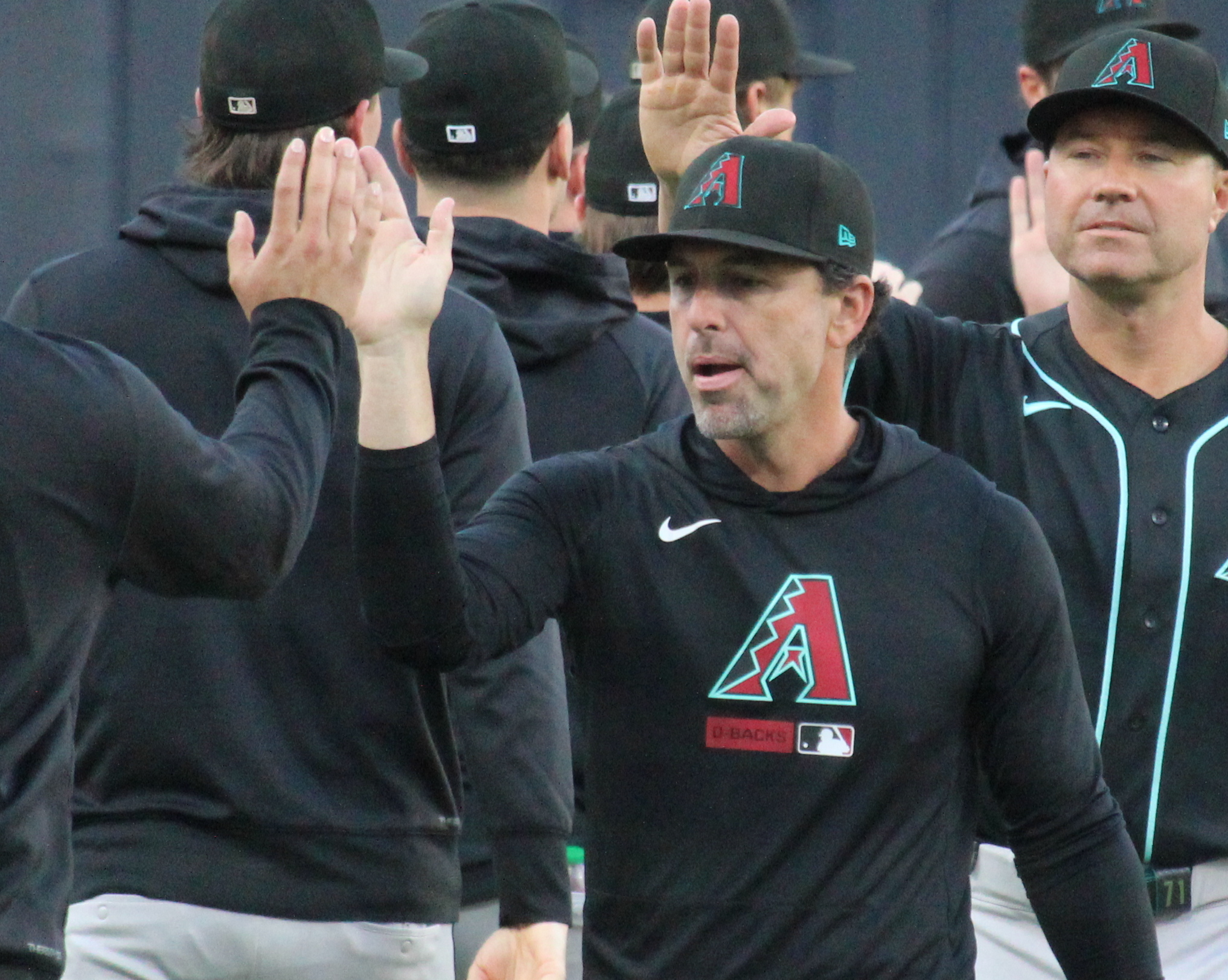
- Kaplan with the Arizona Diamondbacks in 2026
- Coach
- Born: March 8, 1982 (age 44); Poughkeepsie, New York, U.S.

Teams
- Philadelphia Phillies (2022–2024); Arizona Diamondbacks (2025–2026)

Brian Kaplan (born March 8, 1982) is an American professional baseball coach who has worked in Major League Baseball (MLB) for the Philadelphia Phillies and Arizona Diamondbacks. He joined the Diamondbacks coaching staff before the 2025 season started.

== Career ==
Kaplan played baseball at Father Lopez Catholic High School and college baseball for the Notre Dame Fighting Irish in 2000 and 2001. However, his playing career was affected by the condition later known as thoracic outlet syndrome. After transferring to Santa Fe Community College to play for the Santa Fe Saints for the remainder of 2001, as well as 2002, he became a fitness equipment salesman and athletic trainer.

Kaplan was hired by the Philadelphia Phillies in November 2021 as an assistant pitching coach, his first coaching role in Major League Baseball. On November 12, 2024, the Arizona Diamondbacks hired Kaplan as pitching coach for the 2025 season.

Sporting positions
Preceded by Brent Strom	Arizona Diamondbacks pitching coach 2025–2026	Succeeded by TBA
