= Danny Litwhiler =

American baseball player (1916–2011)

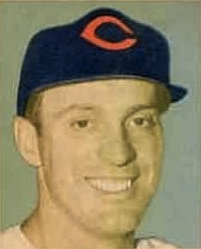
- Litwhiler's 1949 Bowman Gum baseball card
- Left fielder
- Born: August 31, 1916; Ringtown, Pennsylvania, U.S.
- Died: September 23, 2011 (aged 95); Clearwater, Florida, U.S.
- Batted: Right Threw: Right

MLB debut
- April 25, 1940, for the Philadelphia Phillies

Last MLB appearance
- September 25, 1951, for the Cincinnati Reds

MLB statistics
- Batting average: .281
- Home runs: 107
- Runs batted in: 451
- Stats at Baseball Reference

Teams
- Philadelphia Phillies (1940–1943); St. Louis Cardinals (1943–1946); Boston Braves (1946–1948); Cincinnati Reds (1948–1951)

Career highlights and awards
- All-Star (1942); World Series champion (1944)
Medals
Men's baseball
Manager for United States
International Amateur Tournament
Gold medal – first place	1968 Mexico City	Team

Daniel Webster Litwhiler (August 31, 1916 – September 23, 2011) was an American professional baseball player and coach. He played in Major League Baseball as an outfielder from 1940 to 1951 for the Boston Braves, St. Louis Cardinals, Philadelphia Phillies, and Cincinnati Reds. He was the first Major League Baseball player to have an error-free season while playing a full-time position on defense. That same season, 1942, he also became the first player to stitch together the fingers of his glove. After his playing career, he continued to work in baseball as a coach in college sports.

== Early career ==
Before entering baseball, Litwhiler graduated from college, unlike most major leaguers at the time. He graduated from Bloomsburg State Teacher's College in 1938, earning a bachelor's degree in Science and Social Sciences. The baseball facility at Bloomsburg is named Danny Litwhiler Field.

== Major League career ==
After finishing the 1941 season with a .305 batting average, Litwhiler was selected to the All Star game in 1942, where he hit safely in his only at-bat.

In 1942, he recorded 308 putouts and 9 assists without making an error for a 1.000 fielding percentage. Litwhiler had an errorless streak of 187 games before making an error on May 20, 1943, the only error he made that season as he led all outfielders in fielding percentage for the second straight year with a .996 fielding percentage.

Litwhiler was traded to the Cardinals in 1943 and was a key player for them in the 1944 World Series against the St. Louis Browns. He played left field in five of the six games and had four hits with one RBI and two runs scored.

== Coaching career ==
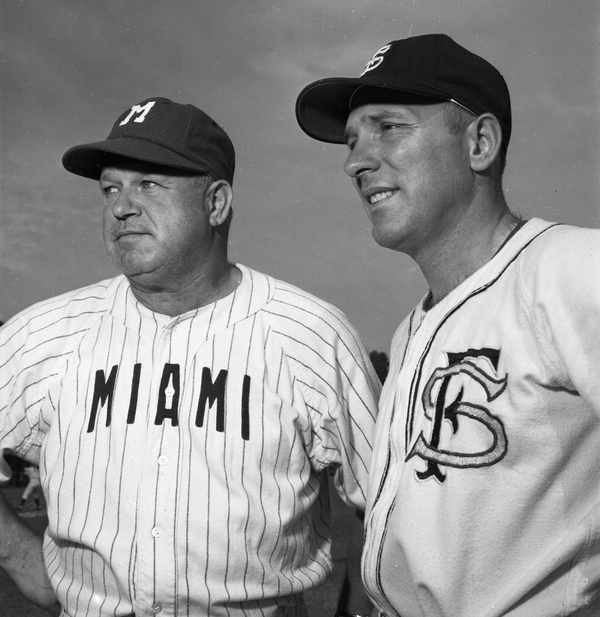
Florida State coach Litwhiler (right) with University of Miami coach Jimmie Foxx (left)

Litwhiler coached at Florida State University from 1955 to 1963, and led them to three College World Series appearances.

He then coached at Michigan State University from 1964 to 1982, and holds the record for most wins by a coach in the school's history. Among his former players are Steve Garvey, Kirk Gibson and Rick Miller.

During his coaching career, he invented a very effective method of drying baseball fields after rain using calcined clay which was marketed as Diamond Grit, enabling play to resume very quickly and in the process saving organized baseball millions of dollars over the decades. He was also one of the first coaches to make use of radar guns to measure pitching velocity, which effectively revolutionized the assessment of pitchers. It first came on the market in collaboration with the Jugs company, known as the Jugs Gun.

== Death ==
Litwhiler died on September 23, 2011, in Clearwater, Florida, at age 95.
