= Brent Strom =

American baseball player and coach (born 1948)

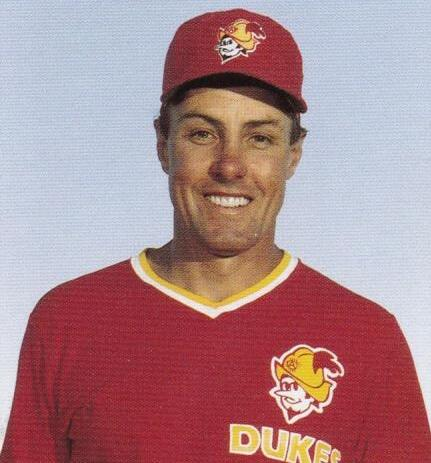
- Strom as pitching coach of the Albuquerque Dukes c. 1987
- Pitcher
- Born: October 14, 1948 (age 78); San Diego, California, U.S.
- Batted: Right Threw: Left

MLB debut
- July 31, 1972, for the New York Mets

Last MLB appearance
- May 17, 1977, for the San Diego Padres

MLB statistics
- Win–loss record: 22–39
- Earned run average: 3.95
- Strikeouts: 278
- Stats at Baseball Reference

Teams
- As player: New York Mets (1972); Cleveland Indians (1973); San Diego Padres (1975–1977); As coach: Houston Astros (1996); Kansas City Royals (2000–2001); Houston Astros (2014–2021); Arizona Diamondbacks (2022–2024); Pittsburgh Pirates (2025)

Career highlights and awards
- World Series champion (2017)
Medals
International Amateur Tournament
Gold medal – first place	1968 Mexico City	Team

Brent Terry Strom (born October 14, 1948) is an American former professional baseball pitcher and pitching coach who most recently served as the assistant pitching coach for the Pittsburgh Pirates of Major League Baseball (MLB). His MLB playing career spanned from 1972 to 1973 and 1975 to 1977 for the New York Mets, Cleveland Indians and San Diego Padres. He served as pitching coach for the Houston Astros in 1996 and from 2014 to 2021, helping guide the club to the 2017 World Series championship. He also coached the Kansas City Royals from 2000 to 2001, and the Arizona Diamondbacks from 2022 to 2024. According to an interview with Tommy John, Strom was the second pitcher to receive Tommy John surgery.

== College and the draft ==
Prior to playing professionally, Strom attended San Diego High School then the University of Southern California, leading them to two NCAA championships. He was originally drafted in the sixth round by the California Angels in the June secondary phase of the 1967 amateur draft. In the January regular phase of the 1967 draft, he was drafted in the second round by the San Francisco Giants, but did not sign either time. He finally did sign when the Mets drafted him third overall in the 1970 draft.

== Professional career ==
Strom began his professional career as a starting pitcher in 1970 with the Visalia Mets. That season, his record was four wins and five losses with a 3.75 earned run average and 79 strikeouts in 72 innings of work. The following year, he split time between the Memphis Blues and the Tidewater Tides, going a combined 13–5 with a 2.85 ERA and 147 strikeouts in 180 innings of work.

He earned a call-up to the majors in 1972 after doing well with the Tidewater Tides. With Tidewater, he had gone 6–7 with a 3.30 ERA in 142 innings of work. He made his big league debut on July 31, pitching well against the Montreal Expos. In his first game, he pitched 6 2/3 innings of work, allowing two runs on two hits and four walks, striking out seven in the process. Although he pitched well, he did not get the decision. The rest of his season did not turn out well; overall, he appeared in 11 games, starting five of them. He went 0–3 with a 6.82 ERA.

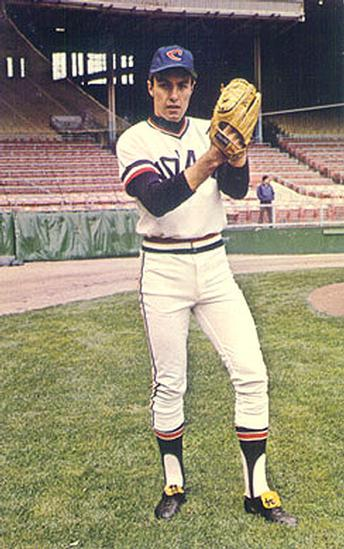
Strom with the Cleveland Indians in 1973

Strom was traded with Bob Rauch from the Mets to the Indians for Phil Hennigan at the Winter Meetings on November 27, 1972. He played only one season with the Indians, 1973, going 2–10 with a 4.61 ERA in 27 games (18 starts).

He did not play in the major leagues in 1974, but on June 21 of that year he was sent (with fellow pitcher Terry Ley) to the Padres to complete an earlier trade that occurred on June 15. The Indians received pitcher Steve Arlin in return. Strom played on the AAA level in 1974 for both the Cleveland and San Diego organizations.

He went 8–8 in 18 games for the San Diego Padres in 1975. His 2.54 ERA was second on the team among all pitchers with at least 15 starts; he trailed only Randy Jones' 2.24 ERA. He had another respectable year in 1976, although his record was 12–16. In 210 2/3 innings, he posted a 3.29 ERA, and his 103 strikeouts led the team. 1977 was his final season in the majors. He appeared in eight games, making three starts. He went 0–2 with a 12.42 ERA. He played his final game on May 17, a game in which the Padres were routed by the Chicago Cubs 23–6.

Although he did not play in the majors after the 1977 season, he remained active in the minors for a few more years. He did not play ball at all in 1978 after being released by the Padres in March of that year. After he was released, Strom became the second person to have Tommy John surgery, performed by Drs. Frank Jobe and Robert Kerlan. He was signed by the Houston Astros in March 1979. In his first year in the Astros' farm system, he pitched for the Daytona Beach Astros, the Columbus Astros and the Charleston Charlies. He went a combined 10–7 with a 3.63 ERA in 139 innings of work. In 1980, he pitched for the Tucson Toros, Houston’s top farm team, and went 11–6 with a 4.37 ERA in 136 innings. Strom played his final year in 1981 with the Albuquerque Dukes in the Los Angeles Dodgers organization.

Overall, Strom went 22–39 with a 3.95 ERA in 100 big league appearances (75 starts). He pitched 501 innings, striking out 278 batters and walking 180. As a batter, he hit .078 in 102 career at-bats.

In the minors, he went 46–30 with a 3.65 ERA.

== Post-playing career ==
Beginning in 1992, Strom served as the pitching coach for the Tucson Toros, Houston Astros, the Kansas City Royals, and then another stint with the Astros. He also served as the minor league pitching coordinator for the Montreal Expos/Washington Nationals organization, and as minor league pitching instructor in the St. Louis Cardinals' organization.

For over 30 years beginning in 1992, Strom was a co-director of the San Diego School of Baseball along with Tony Gwynn, Alan Trammell, and others.

During Strom's first season with the Astros in 1996, Darryl Kile (219) and Shane Reynolds (204) both struck out at least 200 batters. This was the third season in franchise history that the Astros featured least two such hurlers. (Note: Previously in 1969 and 1987. Criteria: Number of players that meet criteria in a season for a team, playing for HOU, in the regular season, requiring strikeouts ≥ 200, sorted by descending instances..) Reynolds later credited Strom with the development of his pitching arsenal, leading to a successful and lengthy major league career.

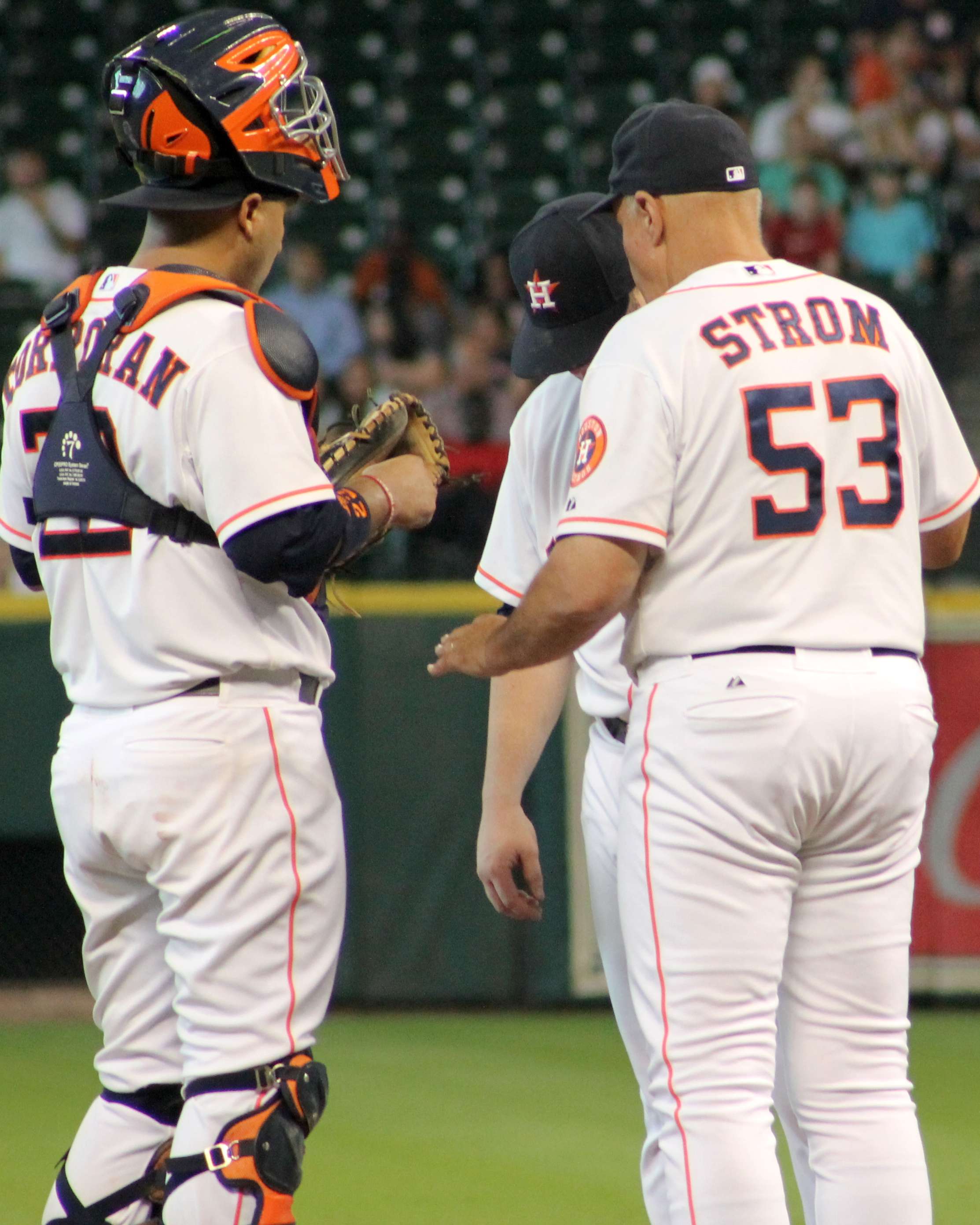
Strom conducting a mound visit with the Houston Astros in 2014

He returned to the Astros as pitching coach for a second stint prior to the 2014 season and continued to serve in that role, teaming again with general manager Jeff Luhnow, previously the Cardinals' farm director. Strom oversaw a pitching staff that emerged as an integral component of the most successful era to-date of Astros baseball, culminated by their first-ever World Series championship in 2017. The Astros then qualified for seven consecutive American League Championship Series (ALCS) from 2017 to 2023. Strom coached Cy Young Award winners Dallas Keuchel (2015) and Justin Verlander (2019), three no-hit games, and, in 2018, the first major league pitching staff with three pitchers who each registered 15 wins, 200 strikeouts and a sub-3.50 ERA (Verlander, Gerrit Cole and Charlie Morton), (Note: Number of players that meet criteria in a season for a team, in the regular season, requiring strikeouts ≥ 200 and wins ≥ 15 and earned run average ≤ 3.5, sorted by descending instances.) among other records and accolades.

Collin McHugh was selected by the Astros off waivers prior to the 2014 season, and made 25 starts for the team that year, yielded a 2.54 ERA and 1.022 WHIP over 154 2/3 innings, gained an 11–9 W–L, and wound up fourth in the American League (AL) Rookie of the Year (ROY) voting.

In his Cy Young-winning season of 2015, Keuchel also became the club's eighth 20-game winner, and turned in the fourth-lowest ERA in club history among left-handers (2.48), the lowest since Andy Pettitte in 2005 (2.39). (Note: For single seasons, throws LH, qualified for league ERA title, playing for HOU, in the regular season, sorted by ascending earned run average.) McHugh, who won 19 games, gave the Astros their first 19-game winning tandem since 1999 (Mike Hampton (22 wins) and José Lima (21)). Will Harris, another wavier claim, recorded a 1.90 ERA and 0,901 WHIP over 68 appearances in 2015. He provided a steady bullpen presence for five seasons, each year with an ERA under 3.50. From 2015 to 2021, the Astros ranked second in the major leagues in both ERA and strikeout percentage,

In 2016, Chris Devenski became the 12th rookie relief pitcher in major league history to deliver each of 100 innings pitched, 100 strikeouts, and sub-3.00 ERA. (Note: Devenski succeeded Pedro Martinez in 1993 as the most recent.) Harris was invited to the 2016 All-Star Game.

Starting in 2017, the Astros won 100 or games each for three successive campaigns, while sending a trio of pitchers to each All-Star Game. For the 2017 Midsummer Classic, Devenski, Keuchel, and Lance McCullers Jr. were chosen.

As of June 2018, Strom was the oldest pitching coach in MLB; however, he had developed a reputation for marrying an old-school baseball mentality with an open-minded approach to new-age analytics. This philosophy resulted in huge success for the Houston pitching staff. The starting trio of Verlander, Cole, and Morton made the 2018 All-Star team. The Astros ranked sixth in MLB in team ERA in 2015, 11th in 2016 and 2017, and first overall in the 2018 season.

"He's one of the few people who's really been able to keep that old-school mentality and take the best things he learned from that era and bring it to the analytical age," said Astros pitcher Lance McCullers Jr.. "When you have a guy that can kind of blend both, you can really rely on his opinions and advice to make you a better pitcher."

In particular, Strom embraced the idea of throwing fastballs high in the zone and curveballs down and used data to convince Astros pitchers to buy into the approach. "With Strom and the methodology the Astros have here, you create room for error by using the entire zone, elevating above the zone, expanding east and west," said Astros pitcher Charlie Morton. "It makes it a lot easier to pitch.”

The Astros acquired Ryan Pressly during the 2018 season, a year in which he led the league in appearances. Transitioning from middle relief, to setup man, to closer, he led the league in holds the following year, and, starting in 2020, Pressly finished in top 10 in saves for the first of four consecutive seasons. In 2018, Astros pitching established a new MLB record by striking out 1,687 opposing batters during the season.

In 2019, Astros pitching tied a major league record by hurling two no-hitters, first on August 3 via a combined effort by Aaron Sanchez, Joe Biagini, Will Harris and Chris Devenski, versus the Seattle Mariners. On September 1, Justin Verlander tossed his third career no-hitter, versus the Toronto Blue Jays. On September 25, Zack Greinke came within two outs of a third no-hitter while starting and winning Houston's record-setting 104th victory. While Verlander won the Cy Young, he (21–6 W–L, 2.58 ERA, 300 K) and Gerrit Cole (20–5 W–L, 2.50 ERA, 326 K) ranked first or second in the American League (AL) in each of wins, ERA, and strikeouts, and at or near the top in nearly every other category, and became just the second teammate duo to attain 300 strikeouts each. (Note: Succeeded Randy Johnson and Curt Schilling of the 2002 Arizona Diamondbacks. Criteria: Number of players that meet criteria in a season for a team, in the regular season, requiring strikeouts ≥ 300, sorted by descending instances.) Harris yielded a 1.50 ERA to establish a club record for relief pitchers (minimum 50 innings). (Note: Surpassed Don McMahon's 1.53 ERA in 1962 campaign, and was later broken by Ryne Stanek (1.15) in 2022.)

In 2020, Framber Valdez finished 11th in the Cy Young balloting and Cristian Javier ranked third for the Rookie of the Year Award.

Following the Astros' 2021 World Series defeat to the Atlanta Braves, Strom announced that he was leaving the organization to retire from professional baseball. Heralded as an architect of an era of increasingly-dominant Astros pitching, he ably blended his experience and teaching with analytics. In addition to Keuchel and Verlander, Strom was credited with assisting Gerrit Cole and Morton in elevating their own success. During their World Series run of 2021, the Astros relied heavily on young pitchers Framber Valdez, Luis García and José Urquidy following losses by injury to Verlander (for the season) and McCullers Jr. (in the American League Division Series), and the departures of Cole and Morton to free agency in seasons prior.

Notwithstanding his announcement that he was retiring following the 2021 World Series, Strom was hired by the Arizona Diamondbacks on November 12, 2021, to serve as the team's pitching coach for the 2022 season. The Diamondbacks reached the World Series the following year, but were eliminated by the Texas Rangers in five games. This was the fifth World Series team in nine seasons in which Strom was the pitching coach, also his fifth overall appearance. On October 3, 2024, Strom was fired by the Diamondbacks.

On November 13, 2024, Strom was hired to serve as the assistant pitching coach for the Pittsburgh Pirates. On September 30, 2025, Strom and the Pirates parted ways.

On August 27, 2026, Strom rejoined the Astros as a pitching consultant. At the time, their starting rotation had the third-highest ERA in the major leagues (5.17}, while the pitching staff had issued the second-most base on balls (550). Following the 2026 season, Strom was conferred the Fred Hartman Award for Long and Meritorious Service to Baseball by the Houston chapter of the Baseball Writers' Association of America (BBWAA).

== Notes ==
Sporting positions
Preceded by Mel Stottlemyre; Doug Brocail	Houston Astros pitching coach 1996; 2014–2021	Succeeded by Vern Ruhle; Josh Miller
Preceded by Mark Wiley	Kansas City Royals pitching coach 2000–2001	Succeeded by Al Nipper
Preceded by Matt Herges	Arizona Diamondbacks pitching coach 2022–2024	Succeeded by Brian Kaplan
