= George Greer (baseball) =

American baseball coach (born 1946)

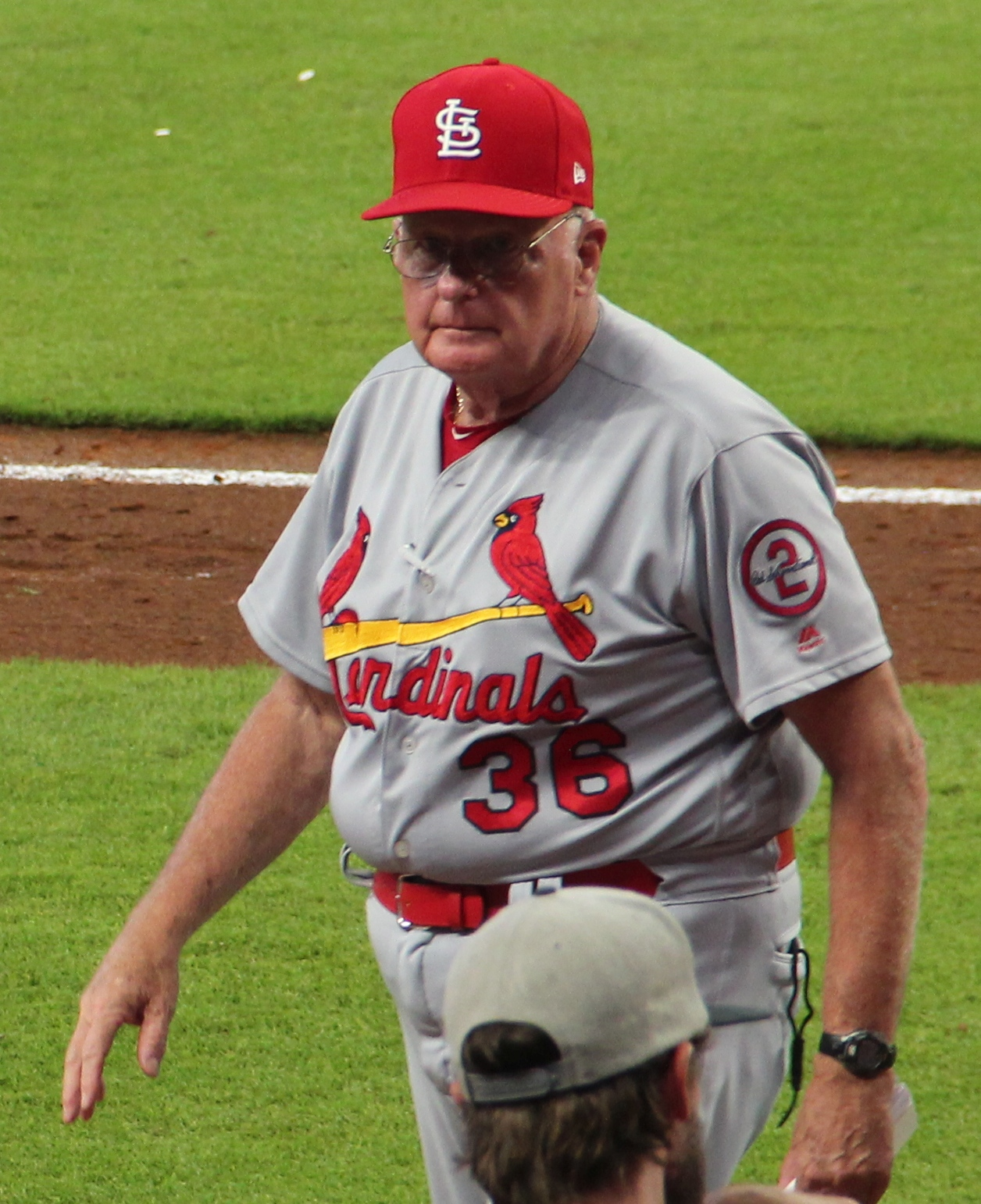
- Greer in 2018
- Coach
- Born: October 18, 1946 (age 79); Westerly, Rhode Island, U.S.
- Bats: Left Throws: Right
- Stats at Baseball Reference

Teams
- St. Louis Cardinals (2018–2019)
Medals
Men's baseball
Representing United States
Pan American Games
Gold medal – first place	1967 Winnipeg	Team

George Edward Greer (born October 18, 1946) is an American baseball coach. He has served as the hitting coach for the St. Louis Cardinals of Major League Baseball (MLB) and was a head coach in college baseball for the Davidson Wildcats and Wake Forest Demon Deacons. He is currently the hitting instructor for the High Point Rockers of the independent Atlantic League.

== Playing career ==
Greer was raised in Westerly, Rhode Island, and graduated from Westerly High School, where he was named an All-State baseball player. He attended the University of Connecticut, where he played college baseball for the Connecticut Huskies. While at Connecticut, Greer played collegiate summer baseball for three seasons (1965–1967) with the Chatham Anglers of the Cape Cod Baseball League (CCBL) and was named a league all-star in 1965 and 1966.

Greer played as a right fielder for the United States national baseball team at the 1967 Pan American Games, hosted by Winnipeg. In the deciding game for the gold medal, Greer drove in the winning run as the U.S. defeated Cuba, 2–1.

Greer was selected by the Cardinals in the 1968 Major League Baseball draft, and played in the Cardinals system for four years, reaching Triple-A with the Tulsa Oilers in 1971.

== Coaching career ==
In 1979 he returned to the CCBL as manager of the Cotuit Kettleers. Greer led the Kettleers to three league titles between 1979 and 1987, and managed several future major leaguers including Will Clark, Ron Darling, John Franco, and Joe Girardi. In 2002, Greer was inducted into the CCBL Hall of Fame.

Greer served as the coach of the Davidson Wildcats from 1982 to 1987 and for the Wake Forest Demon Deacons from 1988 to 2004. With Wake Forest, he had a 608–382–4 win–loss record. He joined the New York Mets organization as a minor league manager. He joined the Cardinals as a minor league baseball coach in 2015. He was promoted to the major league coaching staff on July 15, 2018. The Cardinals opted not to renew Greer's contract after the 2019 season.

== Personal ==
Greer's wife, Becky, served as the superintendent of public schools in Radford, Virginia.

Sporting positions
Preceded by John Mabry	St. Louis Cardinals hitting coach 2018	Succeeded by Jeff Albert
