= Baseball at the 1963 Pan American Games =

- Venue: Estádio Bom Retiro
- Competitors: 5 teams

Medalists
Gold medal	Cuba
Silver medal	United States
Bronze medal	Mexico

Baseball at the 1963 Pan American Games was contested between teams representing Brazil, Cuba, Mexico, United States, and Venezuela. The 1963 edition was the fourth Pan American Games, and was hosted by São Paulo.

== Medal summary ==
=== Medal table ===
Rank	Nation	Gold	Silver	Bronze	Total
1	Cuba	1	0	0	1
2	United States	0	1	0	1
3	Mexico	0	0	1	1
Totals (3 entries)		1	1	1	3

=== Medalists ===
Event	Gold	Silver	Bronze
Men's	Cuba: Franklyn Aspillaga; Antonio Rubio; Daniel Hernández; Fidel Linares; Jorge Trigoura; Lázaro Pérez; António González; Pedro Chávez; Ramón Hechevarría; Raúl Ortega; Modesto Verdura; Ricardo Lazo; Pastor Rodriguez; Santiago Scott; Miguel Cuevas; Aquino Abreu; Urbano González; Manuel Alarcón; Rolando Pastor	United States: Barry Bruckner; Victor Johnson; Larry Tucker; James Westervelt; Robert Jenkins; Douglas Mills; Ted Tollner; Charles Roys; Robert Overman; James Hollister; L. Ferg Norton; Alan DeJardin; Robert Hoover; Richard Mooney; Steve Smith; Archie Moore; Wilson Parma; Thomas H. Jenk	Mexico: Arnold Armenta; Arturo Navarro; Carlos Sánchez; Cirilo Magdaleno; Daniel Navarro; Elias Mier; José Garibay; José Parcero; José Rodríguez; Luís Esma; Luís García; Marío Aguirre; Miguel Ángel Tapia; Pedro Rodríguez; Reynaldo Rodríguez; Roberto Ortíz; Sérgio Murillo; Tomás Valenzuela
