= Baseball at the 1966 Central American and Caribbean Games =

Competition held in San Juan, Puerto Rico

Baseball was contested at the 1966 Central American and Caribbean Games in San Juan, Puerto Rico.

Event	Gold	Silver	Bronze
Men's baseball	Cuba (CUB); Aquino Abreu; Agustín Arias; Lino Betancourt; Miguel Cuevas; Pedro Chávez; Urbano González; Ramón Hechavarría; Félix Herrera; Antonio Jiménez; Ricardo Lazo; Raúl López; Gaspar Pérez; Maximiliano Reyes; Felipe Sarduy; Alfredo Street; Jesús Torriente	Puerto Rico (PUR); Ramón Ortiz; José E. Marrero; Venerado Calderón; Aníbal Baergas; Carlos Ramos; Raúl Mercado; Julio Varela; Eduardo Figueroa; Julio Morales; Andrés Cruz; Santiago Montoto; Juan Santos; Carlos E. Acevedo; José Báez; Benjamín Rodríguez	Panama (PAN); Rodolfo Ríos; Reynaldo Juárez; Roberto Franklyn; Reinaldo Salermo; Emilio Castro; Manuel Castillo; Milciades Rodríguez; Dionisio Rice; Dionisio Arraiz; Juan Barton; Gilberto Peynado; Narcilo Marquínez; Ray Lewis; Gilberto Rodríguez; Ovidio Tristán; O. Salcedo

== Round robin ==
Pos	Team	Pld	W	L	RF	RA	RD	PCT	GB
1	Cuba	6	5	1	23	6	+17	.833	—
2	Puerto Rico (H)	6	5	1	27	11	+16	.833	—
3	Panama	6	4	2	21	17	+4	.667	1
4	Dominican Republic	6	3	3	8	9	−1	.500	2
5	Venezuela	6	3	3	16	10	+6	.500	2
6	Mexico	6	1	5	16	25	−9	.167	4
7	Netherlands Antilles	6	0	6	3	36	−33	.000	5

Source: Tournament Summary
(H) Hosts

== Tie-breaker ==
Pos	Team	Pld	W	L	RF	RA	RD	PCT	GB
1	Cuba	1	1	0	6	2	+4	1.000	—
2	Puerto Rico (H)	1	0	1	2	6	−4	.000	1

Source: Tournament Summary
(H) Hosts

June 22, 1966 at Parque Yldefonso Solá Morales
Team	1	2	3	4	5	6	7	8	9	R	H	E
Puerto Rico	0	2	0	0	0	0	0	0	0	2	8	2
Cuba	2	0	0	0	0	2	2	0	X	6	12	2
WP: Gaspar Pérez LP: Julio Valera; Attendance: 6,531; Tournament Summary p. 65
