= Gaspar Pérez (baseball) =

Cuban baseball player

- Pitcher
- Born: April 30, 1943 (age 83); Matanzas, Cuba
- Bats: Right Throws: Right

Career highlights and awards
- Amateur World Series MVP (1969)
Medals
Men's baseball
Representing Cuba
Amateur World Series
Gold medal – first place	1969 Santo Domingo	Team
Pan American Games
Silver medal – second place	1967 Winnipeg	Team
Central American and Caribbean Games
Gold medal – first place	1966 San Juan	Team
Gold medal – first place	1970 Panama City	Team

Angel Gaspar Pérez Guerra (born April 30, 1943) is a Cuban former baseball player. Nicknamed "El Curro", he played in the Cuban National Series from 1964 to 1973 with various teams from his native Matanzas Province.

Pérez debuted in the 1964–65 season with Occidentales, playing under manager Gilberto Torres. Originally a catcher and infielder, he eventually transitioned to pitching but kept a reputation of being a good hitter. He twice led the circuit in wins, in 1965 (his first season) and 1967. In his 1968 season, Pérez led the league in complete games (18) and innings pitched (212.2). He finished his National Series career with a win-loss record of 76–63 and a career earned run average of 2.62.

He is perhaps most famous for his starring role with the Cuba national baseball team at the 1969 Amateur World Series. With Cuba down 1–0 in the final game against the United States, Pérez was brought in to relieve starter Santiago Mederos. He held the US scoreless and then, rather than be substituted for a pinch hitter, knocked in first run to tie the game in the ninth inning; he later scored the winning run after another single by Rigoberto Rosique.
