= Jeff Albert =

American baseball coach (born 1980)

- Hitting coach
- Born: October 31, 1980 (age 45); Rochester, New York, U.S.
- Stats at Baseball Reference

Teams
- Houston Astros (2018); St. Louis Cardinals (2019–2022); New York Mets (2026)

Jeffrey A. Albert (born October 31, 1980) is an American professional baseball coach, he has worked in Major League Baseball (MLB) for the Houston Astros, St. Louis Cardinals, and New York Mets.

== Career ==
Albert graduated from Bishop Kearney High School in Rochester, New York. Albert attended the Rochester Institute of Technology where he hit .301 as a freshman and .351 as a sophomore in NCAA Division III. He then transferred to Butler University, where he played baseball for the Bulldogs. Across his junior and senior seasons, Albert batted .284 with 10 home runs and 66 strikeouts in 299 at bats. After graduating in 2003, he signed with the Washington Wild Things of the Frontier League, an independent baseball league. Albert earned a bachelor's degree in finance from Butler University in 2003 and a master's degree in kinesiology from Louisiana Tech University in 2008.

Albert served as a hitting coach in the St. Louis Cardinals minor league system for five years, and then joined the Astros as their minor league hitting coordinator, a job he held for four years. After the 2017 season, the Astros promoted Albert to assistant hitting coach for the major league team, succeeding Alonzo Powell.

The St. Louis Cardinals hired Albert as their hitting coach after the 2018 season. Albert left the Cardinals after the 2022 season.

On November 15, 2022, Albert was hired by the New York Mets as their Director of Hitting. On October 14, 2025, it was announced that Albert would be the new leader of the Mets' major-league hitting program.

Sporting positions
Preceded by Alonzo Powell	Houston Astros assistant hitting coach 2018	Succeeded by Troy Snitker
Preceded by George Greer	St. Louis Cardinals hitting coach 2019—2022	Succeeded by Turner Ward
