= Marc Hill =

American baseball player (1952–2025)

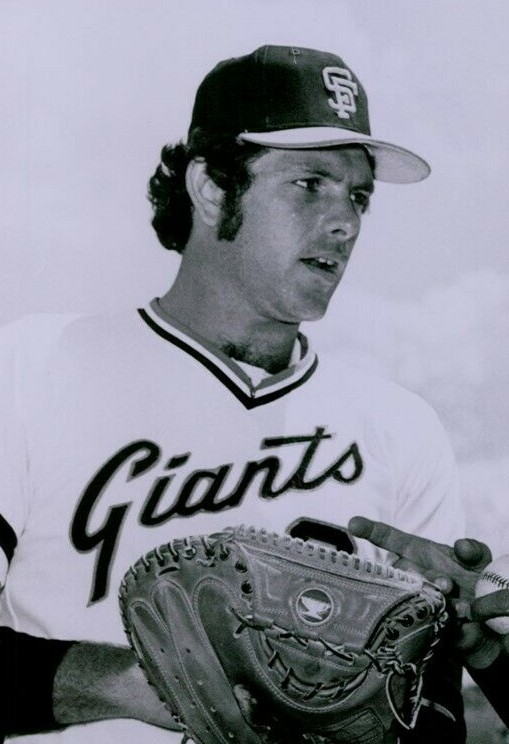
- Catcher
- Born: February 18, 1952; Elsberry, Missouri, U.S.
- Died: August 24, 2025 (aged 73); Elsberry, Missouri, U.S.
- Batted: Right Threw: Right

MLB debut
- September 28, 1973, for the St. Louis Cardinals

Last MLB appearance
- May 25, 1986, for the Chicago White Sox

MLB statistics
- Batting average: .223
- Home runs: 34
- Runs batted in: 198
- Stats at Baseball Reference

Teams
- St. Louis Cardinals (1973–1974); San Francisco Giants (1975–1980); Seattle Mariners (1980); Chicago White Sox (1981–1986)

Marc Kevin Hill (February 18, 1952 – August 24, 2025), nicknamed "the Booter," was an American catcher in Major League Baseball who played for four teams from 1973 to 1986, most notably the San Francisco Giants.

== St. Louis Cardinals ==
Hill was drafted straight out of high school by the St. Louis Cardinals in the tenth round of the 1970 Major League Baseball draft. He batted .244 with 21 home runs & 159 runs batted in over four seasons in their farm system to earn a September callup to the majors in 1973. He appeared in one game, and went 0-for-3, grounding into a double play in his first at bat.

Hill split the 1974 season between the Cardinals and triple-A Tulsa Oilers. His 14 home runs for Tulsa tied for the team lead. Toward the end of the season, the Cardinals sold Tim McCarver's contract to the Boston Red Sox, opening a job for Hill as Ted Simmons' backup for the remainder of the season. Afterward, he was traded to the San Francisco Giants for Ken Rudolph and Elías Sosa.

== San Francisco Giants ==
Hill platooned with Dave Rader behind the plate for two seasons with the Giants. He hit his first major league home run off the Atlanta Braves' Carl Morton on April 12, 1975. Following the 1976 season, Rader was traded to the Cardinals, leaving the starting job solely in Hill's hands. He responded with a career year in 1977, batting .250 with nine home runs and 50 RBIs, both career highs.

He held the starting job until a broken wrist cut short his 1979 season. Partway through the 1980 season, his contract was sold to the Seattle Mariners.

== Chicago White Sox ==
Hill saw little playing time with the Mariners. Following just a half season in Seattle, Hill joined the Chicago White Sox as a spring training invitee, and ended up signing as a free agent with them.

Hill would spend six seasons in Chicago serving as Carlton Fisk's backup. He scored from second base on a sacrifice fly on May 15, 1983 against the New York Yankees, and batted .226 with one home run and 11 RBIs for the 1983 team that won the American League West. He did not appear in the 1983 American League Championship Series.

He received the most playing time of his tenure with the White Sox in 1984, as Fisk battled injuries all season. His 20 RBIs were his most since 1978.

== Career stats ==
Games	PA	AB	R	H	2B	3B	HR	RBI	SB	BB	SO	Avg.	OBP	SLG	OPS	Fld%	CS
737	2047	1809	146	404	62	3	34	198	1	185	243	.223	.295	.317	.612	.990	35%

Hill's only career stolen base came on May 2, 1978. Tom Seaver lived with Hill part-time after joining the White Sox in 1984.

== Minor league manager ==
Once his playing days ended, Hill took a job managing the class A Florida State League Daytona Beach Admirals in 1987, their only year of existence. In 1992, he joined the Seattle Mariners organization as manager of the Peninsula Pilots, who also folded at the end of the season. In their final season, Hill managed Peninsula to a 74-64 record & the Carolina League championship. He spent the next two seasons in the Mariners organization managing the Jacksonville Suns. From there, he moved over to the Pittsburgh Pirates organization, managing the Lynchburg Hillcats for a season, and the Carolina Mudcats for two.

== Death ==
Hill died on August 24, 2025, at the age of 73.
