= Dan O'Brien (pitcher) =

American baseball player (born 1954)

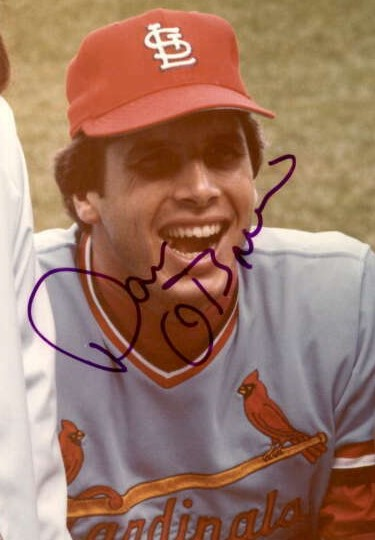
- Pitcher
- Born: April 22, 1954 (age 72); St. Petersburg, Florida
- Batted: Right Threw: Right

MLB debut
- September 4, 1978, for the St. Louis Cardinals

Last MLB appearance
- September 28, 1979, for the St. Louis Cardinals

MLB statistics
- Win–loss record: 1–3
- Earned run average: 5.90
- Strikeouts: 17
- Stats at Baseball Reference

Teams
- St. Louis Cardinals (1978–1979)

Daniel Joques O'Brien (born April 22, 1954) is an American former professional baseball pitcher. O'Brien played in Major League Baseball (MLB) for the St. Louis Cardinals in 1978 and 1979.

== Minor leagues ==
O'Brien attended Bishop Barry High School (St. Petersburg, Florida) and Florida State University. He was drafted by the Cleveland Indians and Chicago White Sox in the 1972 and 1975 amateur drafts, but did not sign with either team. In 1974, he played collegiate summer baseball for the Chatham A's of the Cape Cod Baseball League and was named a league all-star. In 1976, he was drafted again and signed with the Cardinals. He pitched in the Cardinals' farm system from 1976–1978 culminating with the Springfield Redbirds, their AAA affiliate in the American Association.

== Major leagues ==
O'Brien made his MLB debut in the nightcap of a double-header against the Philadelphia Phillies pitching 1 inning but surrendering 3 runs on 5 hits in the Phillies' 10–2 victory on September 4, 1978. His first decision, a loss, came 4 days later when the Cardinals lost, 2–1, to the Phillies at Veterans Stadium. He pitched 8 innings of 1-run baseball but surrendered 2 hits before inducing a groundout to start the bottom of the 9th inning; Buddy Schultz relieved him but gave up the game-winning single 1 out later.

O'Brien opened the 1979 season back with Springfield before joining the Cardinals in early August. His only victory came on August 31, 1979, when he pitched 2 innings of scoreless relief in a 4 1/2 hour, 15 inning marathon against the San Diego Padres at San Diego Stadium.

== Post-Cardinals career ==
After the 1979 season, the Seattle Mariners purchased O'Brien's contract. However, he was released shortly before the 1980 season. He found work with the Richmond Braves, the AAA affiliate of the Atlanta Braves in 1980 and the beginning of the 1981 season. He finished the 1981 season with the Columbus Astros, the Houston Astros' AA affiliate in the Southern League.

== Coaching career ==
O'Brien was a pitching coach at Southern Illinois University Edwardsville in 1983 and at Michigan State University from 1988 to 1991. In 1991, he skippered the Falmouth Commodores of the Cape Cod Baseball League. He was an assistant coach at the University of Michigan from 1991 to 1995.
