= Terry Cornutt =

American baseball player

- Pitcher
- Born: October 2, 1952 (age 73); Roseburg, Oregon, U.S.
- Batted: Right Threw: Right

MLB debut
- April 9, 1977, for the San Francisco Giants

Last MLB appearance
- September 15, 1978, for the San Francisco Giants

MLB statistics
- Win–loss record: 1–2
- Earned run average: 3.61
- Strikeouts: 23
- Stats at Baseball Reference

Teams
- San Francisco Giants (1977–1978)

Terry Stanton Cornutt (born October 2, 1952) is former Major League Baseball pitcher who played for the San Francisco Giants in 1977 and 1978.
