= Rob Dressler =

American baseball player (born 1954)

- Pitcher
- Born: February 2, 1954 (age 71); Portland, Oregon, U.S.
- Batted: Right Threw: Right

MLB debut
- September 7, 1975, for the San Francisco Giants

Last MLB appearance
- October 1, 1980, for the Seattle Mariners

MLB statistics
- Win–loss record: 11–23
- Earned run average: 4.17
- Strikeouts: 129
- Stats at Baseball Reference

Teams
- San Francisco Giants (1975–1976); St. Louis Cardinals (1978); Seattle Mariners (1979–1980)

Robert Alan Dressler (born February 2, 1954) is a former Major League Baseball (MLB) pitcher who played for the San Francisco Giants, St. Louis Cardinals, and Seattle Mariners.

Dressler attended Madison High School in Portland, Oregon. He was an all-state baseball player and second-team all-state football player. He received Portland league honors in those sports and basketball.

The Giants drafted Dressler in the first round with the 19th overall selection of the 1972 MLB draft. He was a Pioneer League All-Star that season. He tied for the Pacific Coast League lead with three shutouts in 1975. He was a September call-up that year, pitching three games for the Giants, including a complete game win against the San Diego Padres. His rookie season was not as successful, as he went 3–10 with a 4.43 earned run average (ERA) in 25 games, 19 of them starts. On July 24, 1978, he was traded to the Cardinals as the player to be named later for a trade that sent catcher John Tamargo to the Giants. Dressler pitched three games for St. Louis at the end of 1978. The Mariners purchased Dressler's contract from St. Louis on June 4, 1979 and brought him back to the majors three days later. He worked in relief for 10 appearances before returning to the starting rotation on July 31. In his final major league season in 1980, Dressler a career-high 149 1/3 innings pitched, with a 4–10 record and 3.98 ERA. He had good control, issuing 1.99 walks per nine innings, 12th lowest in the majors. The Mariners released Dressler on March 26, 1981.

Dressler was inducted into the Portland Interscholastic League Hall of Fame in 2004.

== Personal life ==
Dressler married and had two children.

Dressler studied at Portland State University during the offseason during his playing career, majoring in accounting.
