= Von Joshua =

American baseball player and coach (born 1948)

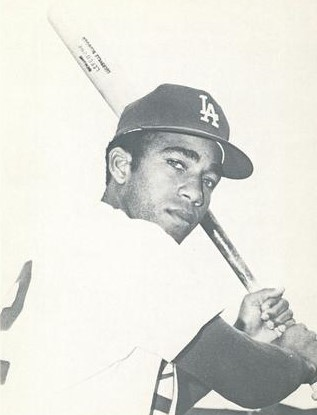
- Outfielder
- Born: May 1, 1948 (age 77); Oakland, California, U.S.
- Batted: Left Threw: Left

MLB debut
- September 2, 1969, for the Los Angeles Dodgers

Last MLB appearance
- August 9, 1980, for the San Diego Padres

MLB statistics
- Batting average: .273
- Home runs: 30
- Runs batted in: 184
- Stats at Baseball Reference

Teams
- As player: Los Angeles Dodgers (1969–1974); San Francisco Giants (1975–1976); Milwaukee Brewers (1976–1977); Los Angeles Dodgers (1979); San Diego Padres (1980); As coach: Chicago Cubs (2009)

Von Everett Joshua (born May 1, 1948) is an American former professional baseball outfielder who played for the Los Angeles Dodgers (1969–71, 1973–74 and 1979), San Francisco Giants (1975–76), Milwaukee Brewers (1976–77) and San Diego Padres (1980) of Major League Baseball (MLB).

== Playing career ==
Joshua was drafted out of Chabot College by the San Francisco Giants in the first round of the 1967 January Major League Baseball draft along the likes of Carlton Fisk. However, Joshua signed with the Los Angeles Dodgers.

He helped the Dodgers win the 1974 National League pennant. However, in that year's World Series, which the Oakland Athletics won in five games over the Dodgers, Joshua went 0-for-4, all in pinch-hitting appearances, including grounding out to relief pitcher Rollie Fingers for the final out of the Series.

In 10 seasons he played in 822 games and had 2,234 at bats, 277 runs, 610 hits, 87 doubles, 31 triples, 30 home runs, 184 RBI, 55 stolen bases, 108 walks, .273 batting average, .306 on-base percentage, .380 slugging percentage, 849 total bases, 15 sacrifice hits, 15 sacrifice flies and 20 intentional walks. Defensively, he recorded a career .976 fielding percentage.

== Coaching career ==
Joshua was the hitting coach for the Albuquerque Dukes for several years in the late 1980s. Joshua was the Iowa Cubs hitting coach, then was hitting coach of the Chicago Cubs from June to October 2009, following the firing of Gerald Perry. He was rehired as the Iowa Cubs hitting coach for the 2010 season.

== Sources ==
- Career statistics from Baseball Reference · Baseball Reference (Minors) · Retrosheet · Baseball Almanac, or Retrosheet, or Pura Pelota
