= Baseball at the 1967 Pan American Games =

- Venues: Winnipeg, Manitoba, Canada
- Competitors: 5 teams

Medalists
Gold medal	United States
Silver medal	Cuba
Bronze medal	Puerto Rico

Baseball at the 1967 Pan American Games was contested between teams representing Canada, Cuba, Mexico, Puerto Rico, and the United States. The 1967 edition was the fifth Pan American Games, and was hosted by Winnipeg.

== Game results ==
The competition consisted of an initial round-robin phase, with each team facing every other team twice. Thus, each team played eight games in the round-robin phase. The top two teams then met in a best-of-three series to determine the champion.

=== Round-robin phase ===
Date	Winner	Score	Loser	Ref.	Standings
July 24	Mexico	3–1	Canada		CUB (1–0), MEX (1–0), PUR (0–0), USA (0–1), CAN (0–1)
July 24	Cuba	4–3	United States		CUB (1–0), MEX (1–0), PUR (0–0), USA (0–1), CAN (0–1)
July 25	Canada	3–2†	Puerto Rico		CUB (1–0), PUR (1–0), MEX (1–1), USA (1–1), CAN (0–2)
July 25	United States	4–1	Mexico		CUB (1–0), PUR (1–0), MEX (1–1), USA (1–1), CAN (0–2)
July 26	Cuba	4–1	Mexico		CUB (2–0), USA (2–1), PUR (1–1), MEX (1–2), CAN (0–2)
July 26	United States	8–3	Puerto Rico		CUB (2–0), USA (2–1), PUR (1–1), MEX (1–2), CAN (0–2)
July 27	United States	14–10	Canada		CUB (3–0), USA (3–1), PUR (1–2), MEX (1–2), CAN (0–3)
July 27	Cuba	3–0	Puerto Rico		CUB (3–0), USA (3–1), PUR (1–2), MEX (1–2), CAN (0–3)
July 28	Cuba	6–4	Canada		CUB (4–0), USA (3–1), PUR (2–2), MEX (1–3), CAN (0–4)
July 28	Puerto Rico	9–5	Mexico		CUB (4–0), USA (3–1), PUR (2–2), MEX (1–3), CAN (0–4)
July 29	Cuba	9–2	United States		CUB (5–0), USA (3–2), PUR (2–2), MEX (2–3), CAN (0–5)
July 29	Mexico	7–3	Canada		CUB (5–0), USA (3–2), PUR (2–2), MEX (2–3), CAN (0–5)
July 30	Puerto Rico	5–2	Canada		CUB (5–0), USA (4–2), PUR (3–2), MEX (2–4), CAN (0–6)
July 30	United States	6–3	Mexico		CUB (5–0), USA (4–2), PUR (3–2), MEX (2–4), CAN (0–6)
July 31	Cuba	6–5 (10)	Mexico		CUB (6–0), USA (5–2), PUR (3–3), MEX (2–5), CAN (0–6)
July 31	United States	7–3	Puerto Rico		CUB (6–0), USA (5–2), PUR (3–3), MEX (2–5), CAN (0–6)
August 1	United States	14–2	Canada		CUB (7–0), USA (6–2), PUR (3–4), MEX (2–5), CAN (0–7)
August 1	Cuba	6–5	Puerto Rico		CUB (7–0), USA (6–2), PUR (3–4), MEX (2–5), CAN (0–7)
August 2	Canada	10–9‡	Cuba		CUB (7–1), USA (6–2), PUR (4–4), MEX (2–6), CAN (1–7)
August 2	Puerto Rico	7–6	Mexico		CUB (7–1), USA (6–2), PUR (4–4), MEX (2–6), CAN (1–7)

† Later ruled a forfeit win for Puerto Rico due to the Canadian team using former professional baseball players.
‡ This was the first international loss for Cuba in 12 years.

=== Championship series ===
Format: best of three

Date	Winner	Score	Loser	Ref.	Series
August 3	United States	8–3	Cuba		USA (1–0), CUB (0–1)
August 4	Cuba	7–5	United States		USA (1–1), CUB (1–1)
August 5	United States	2–1	Cuba		USA (2–1), CUB (1–2)

== Medal summary ==
=== Medal table ===
Rank	Nation	Gold	Silver	Bronze	Total
1	United States	1	0	0	1
2	Cuba	0	1	0	1
3	Puerto Rico	0	0	1	1
Totals (3 entries)		1	1	1	3

=== Medalists ===
Event	Gold	Silver	Bronze
Men's	United States: Ray Blosse; Daniel Carlson; John Curtis; Barry Debolt; Dennis Lamb; Jack Kraus; Mike Lisetski; Mark Marquess; Tim Plodinec; Joe Sadelfield; Kenneth Smith; Steve Sogge; Jim Spencer; Paul Splittorff; Kenneth Szotkiewicz; George Greer; Taylor Toomey; William Wright	Cuba: Manuel Alarcón; Rigoberto Betancourt; Pedro Chávez; Miguel Cuevas; Antonio Gonzalez; Urbano Gonzalez; Ramon Hechevarria; Félix Isasi; Antonio Jiménez; Fermín Laffita; Ricardo Lazo; Elpidio Mancebo; Lazaro Perez; Gaspar Pérez; Felix Rosa; Felipe Sarduy; Alfredo Street; Jesus Torriente; Roberto Valdes	Puerto Rico: Javier Andino; Anibal Baerga; Jose Baez; Luis Camacho; Angel Davila; Heriberto Feliciano; Samuel Garcia; Julio Maysonet; Luis Medina; Francisco Mercado; Ramon Nieves; Ramon Ortiz; Pedro Pacheco; Milton Ramirez; Jose Ramos; Carlos Rodriguez; Antonio Rodriguez; Raul Vives

== Sources ==
- Olderr, Steven (2003). The Pan American Games: A Statistical History, 1951-1999, bilingual edition. McFarland & Company. ISBN 9780786443369.
