= Archie Moore (baseball) =

American baseball player (born 1941)

- Outfielder
- Born: Archie Francis Moore; August 30, 1941 (age 84); Upper Darby Township, Pennsylvania, U.S.
- Batted: Left Threw: Left

MLB debut
- April 20, 1964, for the New York Yankees

Last MLB appearance
- September 28, 1965, for the New York Yankees

MLB statistics
- Batting average: .275
- Home runs: 1
- Runs batted in: 5
- Stats at Baseball Reference

Teams
- New York Yankees (1964–1965)
Medals
Men's baseball
Representing United States
Pan American Games
Silver medal – second place	1963 São Paulo	Team

Archie Francis Moore (born August 30, 1941) is an American former Major League Baseball player. Moore appeared in forty games for the New York Yankees during the 1964 and 1965 seasons, as an outfielder, first baseman and pinch hitter. He batted and threw left-handed.

== Biography ==
Moore grew up in Florham Park, New Jersey. and attended Hanover Park High School in East Hanover Township together with future MLB pitcher Harry Fanok.

He was signed by the Yankees as an amateur free agent in 1963.
