= Troy Snitker =

American baseball coach (born 1988)

New York Mets – No. 60
- Coach
- Born: December 5, 1988 (age 37); Atlanta, Georgia, U.S.
- Bats: Right Throws: Right
- Stats at Baseball Reference

Teams
- As coach: Houston Astros (2019–2025); New York Mets (2026–present)

Career highlights and awards
- World Series champion (2022)

Troy Michael Snitker (born December 5, 1988) is an American professional baseball coach who currently serves as the hitting coach for the New York Mets of Major League Baseball (MLB). He previously served in the same capacity for the Houston Astros.

== Career ==
Snitker attended Brookwood High School in Snellville, Georgia, and played college baseball for South Georgia State College and North Georgia College and State University. The Atlanta Braves selected Snitker in the 19th round of the 2011 MLB draft. He played in Minor League Baseball for the Braves organization until they traded him to the Pittsburgh Pirates in 2013. That year, he played for the Southern Maryland Blue Crabs of the Atlantic League of Professional Baseball, an independent baseball league. Snitker retired prior to the start of the 2014 season, due to a concussion.

After he retired as a player, Snitker became a coach for North Georgia before joining the Houston Astros organization. He served as the hitting coach for the Corpus Christi Hooks in 2018. After the 2018 season, the Astros named him to their major league coaching staff as a hitting coach alongside Alex Cintrón. In 2022, the Astros won 106 games, the second-highest total in franchise history. They advanced to the World Series and defeated the Philadelphia Phillies in six games to give Snitker his first career World Series title. On October 9, 2025, Snitker and the Astros parted ways. On October 27 of the same year, he was reported to have been hired as hitting coach of the New York Mets.

== Personal life ==
Troy is the son of Brian Snitker, the former manager of the Atlanta Braves. In the 2021 World Series, the Houston Astros would face the Atlanta Braves, creating a father-son World Series rivalry. Troy Snitker (for the Houston Astros) and his father Brian Snitker (for the Atlanta Braves) were both present before Game Three of the World Series to hand in their batting lineup cards. The Braves would later go on to win the Series.

Sporting positions
Preceded by Jeff Albert	Houston Astros assistant hitting coach 2019—2025	Succeeded by Anthony Iapoce
