= Mike Tyson (baseball) =

American baseball player (born 1950)

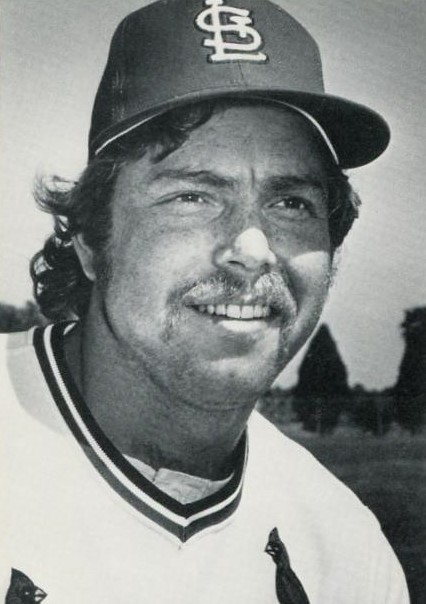
- Second baseman / Shortstop
- Born: January 13, 1950 (age 76); Rocky Mount, North Carolina, U.S.
- Batted: Right Threw: Right

MLB debut
- September 5, 1972, for the St. Louis Cardinals

Last MLB appearance
- October 2, 1981, for the Chicago Cubs

MLB statistics
- Batting average: .241
- Home runs: 27
- Runs batted in: 269
- Stats at Baseball Reference

Teams
- St. Louis Cardinals (1972–1979); Chicago Cubs (1980–1981)

Michael Ray Tyson (born January 13, 1950) is a former Major League Baseball second baseman and shortstop. He played in the majors from 1972 to 1981 for the St. Louis Cardinals and Chicago Cubs.

Tyson was drafted by the St. Louis Cardinals in the 3rd round of the 1970 Major League Baseball draft and made his MLB debut with St. Louis on September 5, 1972. He was a regular in the Cardinals' lineup until the end of the 1979 season when he was traded to the Cubs for relief pitcher Donnie Moore.

An underrated defensive player, Tyson finished in the top ten in the National League in dWAR (defensive wins above replacement) in 1974 and 1977. His best offensive season came in the injury-shortened 1976 campaign, when he compiled career highs with a .286 batting average and a .445 slugging percentage while missing about half the season.

Tyson was released by the Cubs on March 15, 1982, at which point he retired from baseball. His lifetime batting average was .241 (714-for-2959) with 27 home runs and 269 RBIs.
