= Vern Rapp =

American baseball coach and manager

Vernon Rapp
- Manager
- Born: May 11, 1928; St. Louis, Missouri, U.S.
- Died: December 31, 2015 (aged 87); Broomfield, Colorado, U.S.
- Batted: Right Threw: Right

Career statistics
- Games managed: 300
- Win–loss record: 140–160
- Winning %: .467
- Stats at Baseball Reference
- Managerial record at Baseball Reference

Teams
- St. Louis Cardinals (1977–1978); Cincinnati Reds (1984)

Vernon Fred Rapp (May 11, 1928 – December 31, 2015) was an American Major League Baseball manager and coach. A career minor league catcher and a successful skipper in the minors, Rapp had two brief tours of duty as a big league manager.

== Minor league playing career ==
Born in St. Louis, Missouri, Rapp signed his first playing contract out of high school in 1945 with his hometown St. Louis Cardinals. A right-handed batter and thrower, he reached the triple A level with the Columbus Red Birds in 1948, but never made it to the major leagues. After missing two seasons due to military service during the Korean War, Rapp was released by the Cardinals in 1955, and signed with the independent Charleston Senators of the American Association for the 1956 season. The experience provided him his first managing job, when, at age 27, he succeeded Danny Murtaugh as field boss of the last-place Senators. As player-manager, Rapp guided his club to only 19 victories in 59 games.

The following season, Rapp joined the New York Giants organization, and batted .302 with eleven home runs for their triple A affiliate, the Minneapolis Millers. After spending 1957 with the Louisville Colonels, Rapp became a player/coach with the Denver Bears. Denver was a New York Yankees affiliate when he joined the club in 1958, and he remained with them through 1960, by which time they were a Detroit Tigers affiliate. During three seasons with the Denver Bears, he became associated with Denver owner Bob Howsam, who would play an influential role later in Rapp's career.

Seasons	Games	AB	Hits	2B	3B	HR	Avg.	Slg.	TB
16	1016	2974	792	139	45	84	.266	.428	1273

While managing the Modesto Reds in 1961 and the Denver Bears in 1976, Rapp inserted himself into the line-up as a pinch hitter once each season, getting a hit both times. He also made two pitching appearances with Modesto in 1961 without giving up a run. With the Arkansas Travelers in 1966, Rapp started a game, pitching two innings and hitting a double in his only at-bat of the game.

== Minor League manager ==
In 1961, Rapp became manager of the Yankees' class C affiliate, the Modesto Reds, and guided them to a 57–82 record. He was promoted to the class B Greensboro Yankees in 1962, where he managed Roy White and Mel Stottlemyre, among other future major leaguers.

After spending two years out of baseball, he rejoined the Cardinals in 1965 — now led by general manager Howsam — as manager of their Class double A Tulsa Oilers and Arkansas Travelers affiliates. In 1969, Howsam, then running the Cincinnati Reds, hired Rapp as manager of the triple A Indianapolis Indians. In seven years with the team, Rapp won two American Association pennants. In 1976, he returned to Denver and continued his success as manager of the Bears (by then a farm team of the Montreal Expos), winning both the regular season Association pennant and playoff championship.

== St. Louis Cardinals ==
His success in Denver led to his hiring as Cardinals' manager for 1977. Rapp took over after the twelve-year reign of Red Schoendienst, a longtime favorite as a Redbird player and pilot. While the 1977 Cardinals improved by eleven games and placed third in the National League East, Rapp's disciplinarian, minor league style of managing made him very unpopular with his players, particularly Al Hrabosky and Bake McBride. Hrabosky was ordered to shave his trademark horseshoe moustache, which was part of the carefully cultivated "Mad Hungarian" persona that he felt helped make him an effective closer. Hrabosky later said that being beardless made him feel "like a soldier going to war without his rifle", and demanded a trade following one season without facial hair courtesy of Rapp's rule against it.

When the Cards suffered through a seven-game losing streak that saw their record fall to 5–11 early in the 1978 season, Rapp was fired April 25 following a win at Olympic Stadium against the Expos. Coach Jack Krol succeeded him for two games, but another former Cardinal star, Ken Boyer, was ticketed for the permanent job.

== The Sports Huddle, WHDH in Boston ==
Inspired by the outpouring of tributes lavished on retiring Boston Red Sox star Carl Yastrzemski, the producers of Boston phone-in radio show The Sports Huddle on radio station WHDH, decided to do a satirical tribute to Rapp, who also planned to retire at the end of the 1983 season after five years as first-base coach of the Montreal Expos (1979–83). On October 2, the last day of the regular season, they proceeded with their tongue in cheek tribute to Rapp, including a mock telethon in which phone callers were invited to pledge money to Rapp's retirement fund (a substantial sum was pledged, though no money was collected), and a song to the tune of Bye Bye Birdie ("Bye Bye Vern Rapp").

The program turned out to be anything but a spoof, though. Cardinal broadcaster Mike Shannon spoke admiringly of the man, and Rapp, reached by telephone in Montreal, was choked up by the whole affair. WHDH also conducted a telephone interview with Sheldon Bender, vice-president of player personnel for the Cincinnati Reds. Until the station called, Bender was unaware that Rapp was retiring. Bender suggested Rapp at a meeting the next day at which the Reds' bosses were discussing whether to fire Manager Russ Nixon. One thing led to another, and Rapp received a surprise phone call from Howsam, who had returned from his own retirement to try to arrest the declining fortunes of the Reds.

Bender admitted "Vern wasn't a candidate for the job until the station called." Rapp decided that managing the Reds was worth unretiring for, and accepted the job on October 5. WHDH sent Rapp the cassette recording of what turned out to be a most momentous broadcast.

== Cincinnati Reds ==
The 1984 Reds, managed by Rapp, were only a half game back of first place with a 23–22 record, when things began to unravel. On May 27 against the Chicago Cubs in Wrigley Field, Reds pitcher Mario Soto shoved third base umpire Steve Rippley for incorrectly calling a long foul ball down the left field line hit by Cubs third baseman Ron Cey a home run. After conferring, the umpires changed their decision and ruled it a foul ball. However, for shoving Rippley, Soto was ejected, prompting him to charge the field and attack Cubs coach Don Zimmer, which triggered a ten-minute bench-clearing brawl.

The Reds won the game, completing a three-game sweep of the Cubs, and followed that with a two-game sweep of the Pittsburgh Pirates. The next day, National League president Chub Feeney suspended Soto five games for the incident on May 27.

The Reds lost fourteen of their next seventeen games, and had fallen ten games back of the San Diego Padres when a second incident involving Soto occurred on June 16. Leading off the fifth inning, Soto threw several brushback pitches at Atlanta Braves slugger Claudell Washington, who had homered in his last at-bat. Washington tossed his bat in the direction of Soto, appeared to go out to retrieve it, but instead walked toward the mound. Umpire Lanny Harris attempted to restrain Washington, but was thrown to the ground. Soto used the distraction to punch Washington. Several of Washington's teammates attempted to hold Washington to the ground. While they were doing that, Soto fired the baseball into the crowd of players, striking Braves coach Joe Pignatano. He was suspended three games for this incident; Washington received a five-game suspension for shoving Lanny Harris.

Following an 8–19 month of July, the Reds began maneuvering to replace Rapp. On August 15, 1984, Cincinnati reacquired veteran Pete Rose, who had been playing for the Montreal Expos at the time, and immediately fired Rapp so Rose could become a player-manager.

Rapp's career major league managerial record was 140 wins in 300 games, for a winning percentage of .467.
