= Tommy Toms =

American baseball player

- Pitcher
- Born: October 15, 1951 (age 74); Charlottesville, Virginia
- Batted: Right Threw: Right

MLB debut
- May 4, 1975, for the San Francisco Giants

Last MLB appearance
- July 2, 1977, for the San Francisco Giants

MLB statistics
- Win–loss record: 0–3
- Earned run average: 5.40
- Innings pitched: 23⅓
- Stats at Baseball Reference

Teams
- San Francisco Giants (1975–1977)

Thomas Howard Toms (born October 15, 1951) is an American former professional baseball player. He was a relief pitcher who played from 1975 through 1977 in Major League Baseball. Listed at 6 ft 4 in (1.93 m), 195 pounds (88 kg), Toms batted and threw right-handed. He was born in Charlottesville, Virginia, graduated from Albemarle High School, and attended East Carolina University.

Toms played with the San Francisco Giants in parts of three seasons. He posted a 0–3 record with a 5.40 earned run average and one save in 11 relief appearances, allowing 20 runs (14 earned) on 33 hits and nine walks while striking out five in 23⅓ innings of work.

Though he never won a game at the major league level, Toms did pick up one career save. It came on September 7, 1976 where Toms retired the final 2 batters of the game to nail down a 6-3 Giants victory over the Braves.

Toms also pitched six seasons in the minor leagues (1973–1978) and went 31–20 with a 3.08 ERA in 261 games.
