= John VanOrnum =

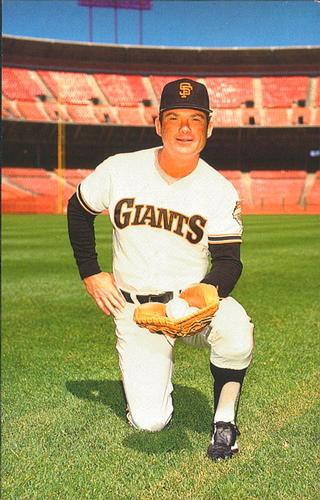
- Catcher
- Born: October 20, 1939; Pasadena, California
- Died: July 6, 2024 (aged 84)

John Clayton VanOrnum (October 20, 1939 — July 6, 2024) was an American professional baseball player, manager, coach and scout. From 1980 through 1984, VanOrnum served as the bullpen coach of the San Francisco Giants of Major League Baseball.

Primarily a catcher during his six-year minor league playing career (1959–64), he was a member of the Los Angeles Dodgers and Los Angeles Angels organizations, then managed in the Giants' farm system at the Class A and Double-A levels from 1973 to 1978. He threw and batted right-handed, and stood 5 feet 11 inches (1.80 m) tall and weighed 180 pounds (82 kg).

After his term as a Giants' coach under Dave Bristol, Frank Robinson and Danny Ozark, VanOrnum then worked as a Major League and advance scout for the Giants, Dodgers, Angels and Atlanta Braves through 2004.

Early in his playing career, VanOrnum served as the catcher on the 1959–60 television series Home Run Derby, which was filmed at Los Angeles' Wrigley Field.

Preceded by Tom Haller	San Francisco Giants bullpen coach 1980–1984	Succeeded by Jack Mull
