= Mike Sadek =

American baseball player (1946–2021)

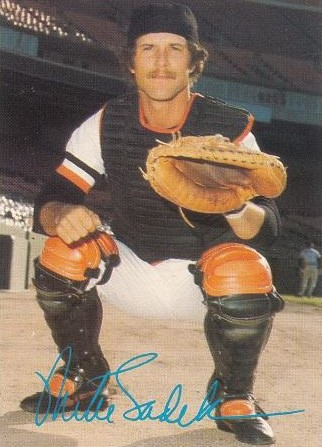
- Catcher
- Born: May 30, 1946; Minneapolis, Minnesota, U.S.
- Died: January 20, 2021 (aged 74); San Andreas, California, U.S.
- Batted: Right Threw: Right

MLB debut
- April 13, 1973, for the San Francisco Giants

Last MLB appearance
- June 10, 1981, for the San Francisco Giants

MLB statistics
- Batting average: .226
- Home runs: 5
- Runs batted in: 74
- Stats at Baseball Reference

Teams
- San Francisco Giants (1973, 1975–1981)

Michael George Sadek (/ˈseɪdɛk/ SAY-dek; May 30, 1946 – January 20, 2021) was an American baseball player who was a catcher in Major League Baseball (MLB). Originally drafted by the Minnesota Twins in 1969, he spent his entire major league career with the San Francisco Giants. He was a backup throughout his eight-year major league career, which spanned the years 1973 and 1975 through 1981. Sadek's nickname was "The Sheik", which was coined by Giants teammate Craig Robinson, who, upon seeing the name Mohammed Ahmed Sadek, declared to the catcher, "Hey, you're a sheik." During his time in MLB, he was known as one of the most funny jokesters.

Appeared with his son Mike Jr. on the TBS superstation game show Starcade in 1984 as a contestant.

In the 1996 film The Fan, Sadek served as Robert De Niro's body double in scenes where DeNiro's character was throwing a baseball. His survived by his son, Mike Jr., along with a daughter, Nicole, who died at age 25 in a parachuting accident.

Sadek died on January 20, 2021, in San Andreas, California, at the age of 74.

== Sources ==
- Career statistics from MLB · Baseball Reference · Baseball Reference (Minors) · Retrosheet · Baseball Almanac
