= Gary Lavelle =

American baseball player (born 1949)

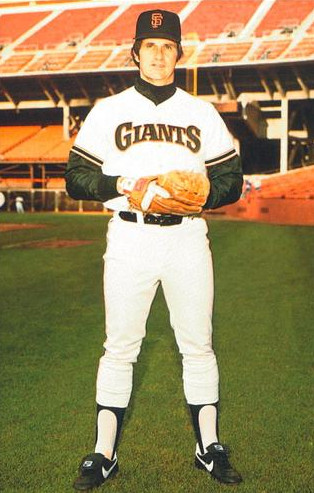
- Lavelle in 1983
- Pitcher
- Born: January 3, 1949 (age 77); Scranton, Pennsylvania, U.S.
- Batted: Switch Threw: Left

MLB debut
- September 10, 1974, for the San Francisco Giants

Last MLB appearance
- October 3, 1987, for the Oakland Athletics

MLB statistics
- Win–loss record: 80–77
- Earned run average: 2.93
- Strikeouts: 769
- Saves: 136
- Stats at Baseball Reference

Teams
- San Francisco Giants (1974–1984); Toronto Blue Jays (1985, 1987); Oakland Athletics (1987)

Career highlights and awards
- 2× All-Star (1977, 1983); San Francisco Giants Wall of Fame

Gary Robert Lavelle (born January 3, 1949) is an American former professional baseball pitcher who played in Major League Baseball from 1974 to 1987.

== Early life and education ==
Lavelle was born in Scranton, Pennsylvania on January 3, 1949, and grew up in Bethlehem, Pennsylvania. He attended Liberty High School in Bethlehem.

== Major League Baseball ==
Lavelle spent the majority of his Major League career with the San Francisco Giants, where he played from 1974 to 1984. He also played for the Toronto Blue Jays and Oakland Athletics before retiring in 1987.

He posted a career high 13 wins in 1978 and accumulated 136 saves in his 13-season career. He was named to the All-Star team in 1977 and 1983.

As of 2023, Lavelle ranks 70th in all-time Major League games finished by a pitcher.

== Personal life ==
Lavelle became a born again Christian during his playing career. He was considered the leader of the Giants' contingent of Christian players during his playing days.

Lavelle lives in Virginia Beach, Virginia, where he coaches college baseball at Bryant & Stratton College's Virginia Beach campus. He was previously head coach at Greenbrier Christian Academy in Chesapeake, Virginia, where he earned his 500th victory in April 2014.

== See also ==
- List of Major League Baseball career games finished leaders
