= Johnnie LeMaster =

American baseball player (born 1954)

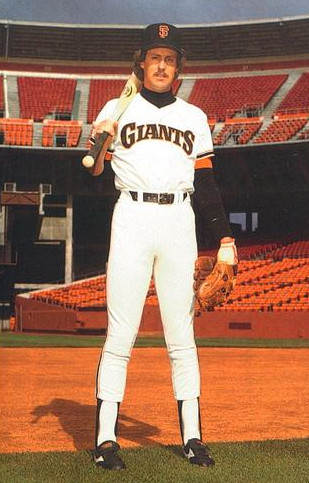
- LeMaster in 1983
- Shortstop
- Born: June 19, 1954 (age 72); Portsmouth, Ohio, U.S.
- Batted: Right Threw: Right

MLB debut
- September 2, 1975, for the San Francisco Giants

Last MLB appearance
- July 28, 1987, for the Oakland Athletics

MLB statistics
- Batting average: .222
- Home runs: 22
- Runs batted in: 229
- Stats at Baseball Reference

Teams
- San Francisco Giants (1975–1985); Cleveland Indians (1985); Pittsburgh Pirates (1985); Oakland Athletics (1987)

Career highlights and awards
- San Francisco Giants Wall of Fame

Johnnie Lee LeMaster (born June 19, 1954) is an American former Major League Baseball infielder. He played for four teams over a 12 year (1975–1985 and 1987) MLB career, including 10 seasons with the San Francisco Giants. He batted and threw right-handed.

== Professional career ==
On September 2, 1975, LeMaster became the third player in major league history to hit an inside-the-park home run in his first at bat, during a 7–3 win over the Dodgers. LeMaster hit only 21 home runs during the rest of his career (3,191 at bats).

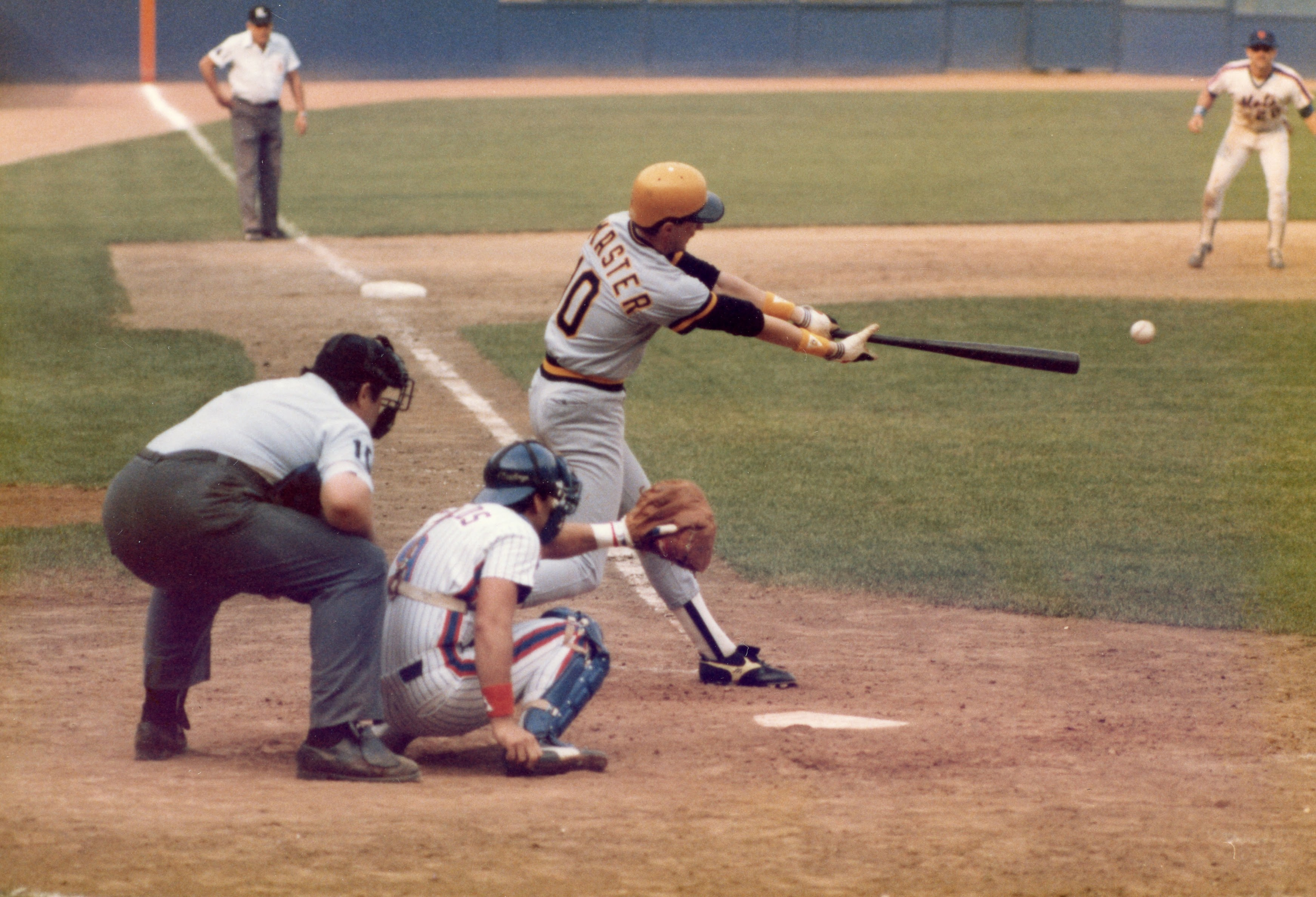
LeMaster at bat for Pittsburgh at Shea Stadium on September 21, 1985

LeMaster is remembered for a game in July 1979, when he took the field wearing the phrase on his back that Giants fans often welcomed him with; in place of his last name was the word "BOO".

In 1983, LeMaster amassed over 100 hits for the only time in his career, batting .240 and finishing seventh in the National League with 39 stolen bases while finishing third in the National League with 19 times caught stealing.

During the 1985 season, he played for three teams: the San Francisco Giants, the Cleveland Indians, and the Pittsburgh Pirates; all three teams ended up in last place in their respective divisions. After retirement, in 1988, he played one season with the Senior Professional Baseball Association, on the Fort Myers Sun Sox.

LeMaster was a career .222 hitter with 22 home runs and 229 runs batted in in 1039 games.

== Personal life ==
LeMaster resides in Paintsville, Kentucky. He is a devout Christian. After his professional baseball career, Johnnie ran “Johnnie LeMaster's Sports Centers”, athletic stores in Paintsville and Pikeville. Both locations have since closed, the former being bought and replaced by Hibbett Sports.

LeMaster is a distant cousin of Frank LeMaster, who played football for the University of Kentucky and the Philadelphia Eagles.. His grandson is Griffin Collins.

LeMaster remained active in baseball throughout his life, acting as head coach for multiple baseball programs including the University of Pikeville and, later, Paul G. Blazer High School.

The UPIKE Bears baseball team still practice at Johnnie LeMaster Field.

From 2016 through his 2019 resignation, LeMaster coached baseball at Paul G. Blazer High School in Ashland, Kentucky.
