= Jack Krol =

American baseball coach and manager

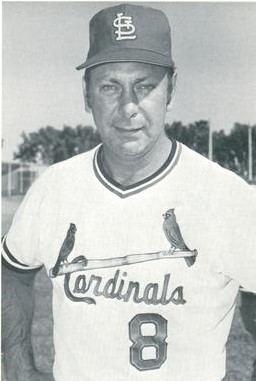
- Coach / Manager
- Born: July 5, 1936; Chicago, Illinois, U.S.
- Died: May 30, 1994 (aged 57); Winston-Salem, North Carolina, U.S.
- Batted: Right Threw: Right

Teams
- As coach: St. Louis Cardinals (1977–1980); San Diego Padres (1981–1986); As manager: St. Louis Cardinals (1978, 1980)

John Thomas Krol (July 5, 1936 – May 30, 1994) was an American coach and manager in Major League Baseball.

Primarily a second baseman and shortstop, the right-handed hitting and throwing Krol never reached the Major Leagues during his playing career (1954–66). The native of Chicago, Illinois, spent most of that period in the St. Louis Cardinals farm system, and became a playing manager in 1966 with the Rock Hill, South Carolina, franchise of the Class A Western Carolinas League.

By 1972 he was managing at the Triple-A level in the St. Louis system, and received his Major League baptism as a Cardinals coach in 1977, working on the Redbirds' staff through 1980 and twice served as interim manager (in 1978 and 1980), winning one game and losing two.

Krol then joined the San Diego Padres as a Major League coach (1981–86) and was a member of the staff of Dick Williams when the 1984 Padres won the National League pennant. Next, Krol was a minor league manager (1987–90) in the San Diego organization.

Krol returned to the Cardinals as manager of the Triple-A Louisville Redbirds in 1992–93. Over his 17-year minor league managerial career, he won 1,160 games and lost 1,139 (.503) and won three championships.

He died at age 57 due to cancer in Winston-Salem, North Carolina. In his memory, the Padres created the Jack Krol Award, which annually honors the club's top player development personnel.

== See also ==
- List of St. Louis Cardinals coaches
