= Craig Robinson (baseball) =

American baseball player (born 1948)

- Shortstop
- Born: August 21, 1948 (age 77); Abington, Pennsylvania, U.S.
- Batted: Right Threw: Right

MLB debut
- September 9, 1972, for the Philadelphia Phillies

Last MLB appearance
- October 1, 1977, for the Atlanta Braves

MLB statistics
- Batting average: .219
- Home runs: 0
- Runs batted in: 42
- Stats at Baseball Reference

Teams
- Philadelphia Phillies (1972–1973); Atlanta Braves (1974–1975); San Francisco Giants (1975–1976); Atlanta Braves (1976–1977)

Craig George Robinson (born August 21, 1948) is an American former Major League Baseball shortstop who played for the Philadelphia Phillies (1972-1973), Atlanta Braves (1974-1975, 1976-1977), and San Francisco Giants (1975-1976). He batted and threw right-handed.

Robinson was drafted by the Phillies in the 11th round of the 1970 amateur draft. He played 3 seasons in the Minor Leagues before making his Major League debut as a pinch runner at Veterans Stadium on September 9, 1972. He was traded along with Barry Lersch from the Phillies to the Braves for Ron Schueler at the Winter Meetings on December 3, 1973. A career .219 hitter, Robinson started regularly only once, playing 145 games for the 1974 Atlanta Braves.
