= Dave Rader (baseball) =

American baseball player (born 1948)

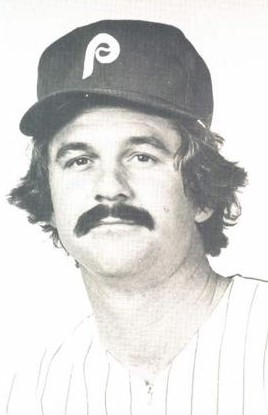
- Catcher
- Born: December 26, 1948 (age 77); Claremore, Oklahoma, U.S.
- Batted: Left Threw: Right

MLB debut
- September 5, 1971, for the San Francisco Giants

Last MLB appearance
- October 5, 1980, for the Boston Red Sox

MLB statistics
- Batting average: .257
- Home runs: 30
- Runs batted in: 235
- Stats at Baseball Reference

Teams
- San Francisco Giants (1971–1976); St. Louis Cardinals (1977); Chicago Cubs (1978); Philadelphia Phillies (1979); Boston Red Sox (1980)

David Martin Rader (born December 26, 1948) is an American former professional baseball player. He played as a catcher in Major League Baseball from 1971 through 1980, with the San Francisco Giants (1971–1976), St. Louis Cardinals (1977), Chicago Cubs (1978), Philadelphia Phillies (1979) and Boston Red Sox (1980). He batted left-handed and threw right-handed.

== Major League career ==
Rader was selected by the San Francisco Giants as their number one pick in the 1967 Major League Baseball draft. He became the Giants' starting catcher in 1972, posting a .259 batting average in 127 games. Rader finished as runner-up to Jon Matlack for the 1972 National League Rookie of the Year Award, and won The Sporting News Rookie of the Year Award.

The next season, he posted career-highs in home runs (9), runs (59), runs batted in (41) and fielding percentage (.991) but hit for only a .229 batting average in 148 games. In 1974 and 1975 he averaged .291 each season. In October 1976, Rader was traded to the St. Louis Cardinals where he served as a reserve catcher working behind Ted Simmons during the 1977 season.

After one year with the Cardinals, he was traded to the Chicago Cubs in December 1977. Rader became the Cubs' regular catcher during the 1978 season, playing in 114 games but, only managed to post a .203 batting average and, in February 1979, he would be traded to the Philadelphia Phillies. He served as a third string catcher with the Phillies, backing up Bob Boone and Tim McCarver. Rader would be traded a final time in March 1980 to the Boston Red Sox where he backed up regular Red Sox catcher, Carlton Fisk. In November 1980, the Red Sox granted Rader free agency. He signed with the California Angels in February 1981 but was released two and a half months later.

== Career statistics ==
In a ten-year major league career, Rader played in 846 games, accumulating 619 hits in 2,405 at bats for a .257 career batting average along with 30 home runs and 235 runs batted in. Rader had a career .983 fielding percentage. Rader was the Giants catcher on August 24, 1975 when Ed Halicki pitched a no-hitter against the New York Mets.
