= Ed Halicki =

American baseball player (born 1950)

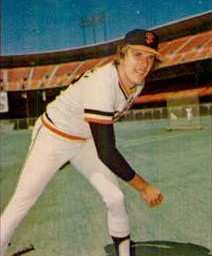
- Pitcher
- Born: October 4, 1950 (age 75); Kearny, New Jersey, U.S.
- Batted: Right Threw: Right

MLB debut
- July 8, 1974, for the San Francisco Giants

Last MLB appearance
- October 1, 1980, for the California Angels

MLB statistics
- Win–loss record: 55–66
- Earned run average: 3.62
- Strikeouts: 707
- Stats at Baseball Reference

Teams
- San Francisco Giants (1974–1980); California Angels (1980)

Career highlights and awards
- Pitched a no-hitter on August 24, 1975

Edward Louis Halicki (/həˈlɪkiː/ hə-LIK-ee; born October 4, 1950) is an American former professional baseball pitcher who played in Major League Baseball (MLB) from 1974 to 1980 for the San Francisco Giants and California Angels.

== Career ==
On August 24, 1975, Halicki threw a no-hitter for the San Francisco Giants against the New York Mets in a 6–0 victory. Halicki's no hitter was the last no-hit game by a Giants pitcher at home until Jonathan Sánchez's no-hit winning game on July 10, 2009. Halicki attended Kearny High School and Monmouth University. Halicki was primarily a starting pitcher (157 starts, 35 relief appearances) but on August 13, 1978, he recorded his only save at the MLB level against the arch rival Los Angeles Dodgers. Halicki retired the only 2 batters he faced to preserve a 7–6 Giants victory.

== See also ==
- List of Major League Baseball no-hitters

Preceded by Nolan Ryan	No-hit game August 24, 1975	Succeeded by Vida Blue, Glenn Abbott, Paul Lindblad & Rollie Fingers
