= Ken Rudolph =

American baseball player (born 1946)

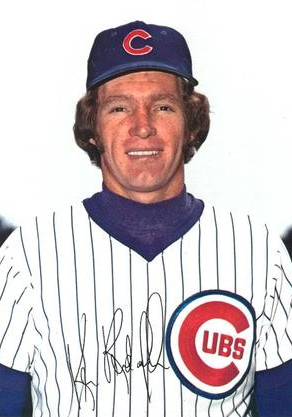
- Rudolph with the Cubs in 1973
- Catcher
- Born: December 29, 1946 (age 79); Rockford, Illinois, U.S.
- Batted: Right Threw: Right

MLB debut
- April 20, 1969, for the Chicago Cubs

Last MLB appearance
- September 7, 1977, for the Baltimore Orioles

MLB statistics
- Batting average: .213
- Home runs: 6
- Runs batted in: 64
- Stats at Baseball Reference

Teams
- Chicago Cubs (1969–1973); San Francisco Giants (1974); St. Louis Cardinals (1975–1976); San Francisco Giants (1977); Baltimore Orioles (1977)

Kenneth Victor Rudolph (born December 29, 1946) is an American former professional baseball player. A catcher, he appeared in 328 Major League games played between 1969–1977 for the Chicago Cubs, St. Louis Cardinals, San Francisco Giants and Baltimore Orioles. Rudolph threw and batted right-handed, stood 6 feet 1 inch (1.85 m) tall and weighed 180 pounds (82 kg).

In 328 games over 9 seasons, Rudolph posted a .213 batting average (158-for-743) with 55 runs, 6 home runs and 64 RBI.

Rudolph was the head varsity baseball coach at Arcadia High School (Arizona) until 2013.
