= 1973 New York Mets season =

1973 New York Mets
- National League champions National League East champions
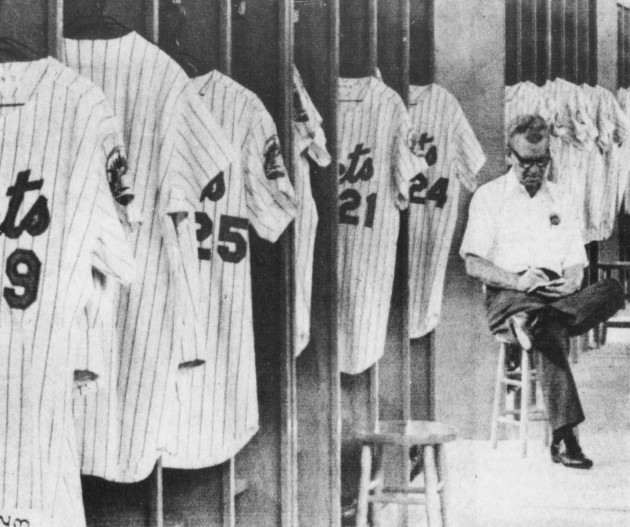
- Mets equipment staffer John Sellers sits in the locker room of Payson Field in St. Petersburg, Florida in 1973.
- League: National League
- Division: East
- Ballpark: Shea Stadium
- City: New York City, New York
- Record: 82–79 (.509)
- Divisional place: 1st
- Owners: Joan Whitney Payson
- General manager: Bob Scheffing
- Manager: Yogi Berra
- Television: WOR-TV
- Radio: WHN (Ralph Kiner, Lindsey Nelson, Bob Murphy)
- Stats: ESPN.com; Baseball Reference

The 1973 New York Mets season was the 12th regular season for the Mets, who played home games at Shea Stadium. Manager Yogi Berra led the team to a National League East title with an 82–79 record and the National League pennant, though they were defeated by the Oakland Athletics in the World Series. Their .509 winning percentage is the lowest of any pennant-winner in major league history. Having won only 82 games during the regular season, the 1973 Mets set the record in qualifying for the postseason with the fewest regular season wins since MLB expanded to a 162-game season in 1961, and the fewest of any team since 1885.

The record (which excludes the strike-shortened 1981 season and the 2020 season shortened by the COVID-19 pandemic) was matched by the 2005 San Diego Padres before the record was eclipsed by the 2026 Houston Astros. The season was well known for pitcher Tug McGraw's catchphrase "Ya Gotta Believe!!!"

The Mets would not return to the postseason again until 1986, a 12-year drought that currently remains the longest in franchise history.

== Offseason ==
- November 1, 1972: Danny Frisella and Gary Gentry were traded by the Mets to the Atlanta Braves for Félix Millán and George Stone.
- November 27, 1972: Brent Strom and Bob Rauch were traded by the Mets to the Cleveland Indians for Phil Hennigan.
- November 27, 1972: Tommie Agee was traded by the Mets to the Houston Astros for Rich Chiles and Buddy Harris.
- November 30, 1972: Dave Marshall was traded by the Mets to the San Diego Padres for Al Severinsen.
- March 28, 1973: Bill Sudakis was traded by the Mets to the Texas Rangers for Bill McNulty.

== Regular season ==
=== Season highlights ===
==== Initial turmoil ====
The 1973 Mets were much improved from their "miracle" 1969 team. They had a group of young proven stars—including Jon Matlack, Rusty Staub, John Milner, and Félix Millán—mixed in with veterans from the 1969 club, such as Jerry Grote, Cleon Jones, Wayne Garrett, and Bud Harrelson. Their pitching staff, led by Tom Seaver, was among the finest in baseball. But injuries hampered the Mets throughout the entire season.

The Mets got off to a 4–0 start to the season, and were still at first place by April 29 with a 12–8 record. But then, injuries to their key players caused turmoil. By July 26, the Mets were in last place, yet still only 7 1/2 games behind. On August 16, they were 12 games below .500, with 44 games to play.

On August 30, the Mets were in last place, with only a month left to play. However, the division was so tight-knit that the last place standing consisted of only a 6 1/2 game deficit. At the completion of August (one day later), the Mets were in fifth place, nine games under .500, but, in the balanced mediocrity of that year's division, just 5 1/2 games out of first. The mathematical inequities of divisional play were beginning to show up. On September 11, the Mets were in fourth place, five games under .500, but just three games out. Ahead of them were the St. Louis Cardinals, Pittsburgh Pirates, and Montreal Expos.

==== "You Gotta Believe!!!" ====
With Tug McGraw urging his teammates on and celebrating victories with what soon became the catch phrase of 1973, "You Gotta Believe!!!" the Mets clinched the most unlikely of pennants. Yogi Berra, a veteran of pennant races, used a four-man rotation down the stretch: Tom Seaver, Jerry Koosman, Jon Matlack, and George Stone, with the suddenly unhittable McGraw coming out of the pen with boisterous, justified confidence. In his last 19 games, the screwball-throwing lefty recorded 5 wins, converted 12 saves and had an ERA of 0.88.

==== "Ball on the wall" play ====
One of the most famous plays in Mets folklore occurred when their September 20 match-up against the Pirates at Shea Stadium went into extra innings. The Pirates had Richie Zisk on first base when Dave Augustine hit what appeared to be a two-run home run to left. Instead, the ball hit the top of the wall, and caromed directly into left fielder Cleon Jones' glove. Jones fired a strike to Wayne Garrett as the cut-off man, who in turn, fired a strike to catcher Ron Hodges to nail Zisk at the plate. The Mets went on to win the game in the bottom of the inning as part of a three-game sweep.

==== The unexpected clincher ====
After completing the three-game sweep of the Pirates on September 21, the Mets' record stood at an even 77–77, but that .500 record was good enough for first place and a half-game lead. Illustrating just how dense the crowd was at the top, the fifth-place Chicago Cubs were just 2 1/2 out. The Mets won five of their last seven to finish as National League East champions. The clinching took place at Wrigley Field on October 1 as the Mets beat the Cubs 6–4 as Tom Seaver won his 19th game of 1973 and Tug McGraw recorded the save. The Cardinals finished second, 1 1/2 games back, Pittsburgh third at 2 1/2, Montreal fourth at 3 1/2, and Chicago fifth at 5 games back.

This was the only NL East title between 1970 and 1980 not to be won by either the Philadelphia Phillies or the Pittsburgh Pirates.

=== Season standings ===
NL East
Team	W	L	Pct.	GB	Home	Road
New York Mets	82	79	.509	—	43‍–‍38	39‍–‍41
St. Louis Cardinals	81	81	.500	1½	43‍–‍38	38‍–‍43
Pittsburgh Pirates	80	82	.494	2½	41‍–‍40	39‍–‍42
Montreal Expos	79	83	.488	3½	43‍–‍38	36‍–‍45
Chicago Cubs	77	84	.478	5	41‍–‍39	36‍–‍45
Philadelphia Phillies	71	91	.438	11½	38‍–‍43	33‍–‍48

=== Record vs. opponents ===
1973 National League record Sources:
Team	ATL	CHC	CIN	HOU	LAD	MON	NYM	PHI	PIT	SD	SF	STL
Atlanta	—	7–5	5–13	11–7	2–15–1	6–6	6–6	6–6	7–5	12–6	8–10	6–6
Chicago	5–7	—	8–4	6–6	5–7	9–9	10–7	10–8	6–12	7–5	2–10	9–9
Cincinnati	13–5	4–8	—	11–7	11–7	8–4	8–4	8–4	7–5	13–5	10–8	6–6
Houston	7–11	6–6	7–11	—	11–7	6–6	6–6	7–5	6–6	10–8	11–7	5–7
Los Angeles	15–2–1	7–5	7–11	7–11	—	7–5	7–5	9–3	10–2	9–9	9–9	8–4
Montreal	6–6	9–9	4–8	6–6	5–7	—	9–9	13–5	6–12	7–5	6–6	8–10
New York	6–6	7–10	4–8	6–6	5–7	9–9	—	9–9	13–5	8–4	5–7	10–8
Philadelphia	6–6	8–10	4–8	5–7	3–9	5–13	9–9	—	8–10	9–3	5–7	9–9
Pittsburgh	5–7	12–6	5–7	6–6	2–10	12–6	5–13	10–8	—	8–4	5–7	10–8
San Diego	6–12	5–7	5–13	8–10	9–9	5–7	4–8	3–9	4–8	—	7–11	4–8
San Francisco	10–8	10–2	8–10	7–11	9–9	6–6	7–5	7–5	7–5	11–7	—	6–6
St. Louis	6–6	9–9	6–6	7–5	4–8	10–8	8–10	9–9	8–10	8–4	6–6	—

=== Opening Day starters ===
- Duffy Dyer
- Jim Fregosi
- Bud Harrelson
- Cleon Jones
- Willie Mays
- Félix Millán
- John Milner
- Tom Seaver
- Rusty Staub

=== Notable transactions ===
- June 5, 1973: Lee Mazzilli was drafted by the Mets in the 1st round (14th pick) of the 1973 Major League Baseball draft.
- July 11, 1973: Jim Fregosi was sold by the Mets to the Texas Rangers.

=== Roster ===
1973 New York Mets
Roster
Pitchers: 34 Bob Apodaca; 38 Buzz Capra; 34 Phil Hennigan; 36 Jerry Koosman; 32 Jon Matlack; 43 Jim McAndrew; 45 Tug McGraw; 30 Bob Miller; 39 Tommy Moore; 31 Harry Parker; 33 Ray Sadecki; 41 Tom Seaver; 40 George Stone; 39 John Strohmayer; 27 Craig Swan; 22 Hank Webb	Catchers: 10 Duffy Dyer; 15 Jerry Grote; 42 Ron Hodges; 20 Jerry May; Infielders: 5 Jim Beauchamp; 12 Ken Boswell; 2 Jim Fregosi; 11 Wayne Garrett; 3 Bud Harrelson; 7 Ed Kranepool; 17 Ted Martínez; 16,17 Félix Millán; 28 John Milner; 19 Brian Ostrosser	Outfielders: 29 Rich Chiles; 5 Jim Gosger; 25 Don Hahn; 21 Cleon Jones; 24 Willie Mays; 16 Dave Schneck; 4 Rusty Staub; 9,18 George Theodore; Other batters: 1 Lute Barnes; 6 Greg Harts	Manager: 8 Yogi Berra; Coaches: 51 Roy McMillan; 52 Joe Pignatano; 54 Rube Walker; 53 Eddie Yost

== Game log ==
=== Regular season ===
Legend
Mets Win	Mets Loss	Game Postponed	Clinched division
Bold = Mets team member

1973 regular season game log: 82–79 (Home: 43–38; Away: 39–41)
April: 12–8 (Home: 5–4; Away: 7–4)

#	Date	Time (ET)	Opponent	Score	Win	Loss	Save	Time of Game	Attendance	Record	Box/ Streak

May: 9–14 (Home: 3–8; Away: 6–6)

#	Date	Time (ET)	Opponent	Score	Win	Loss	Save	Time of Game	Attendance	Record	Box/ Streak

June: 11–17 (Home: 7–7; Away: 4–10)

#	Date	Time (ET)	Opponent	Score	Win	Loss	Save	Time of Game	Attendance	Record	Box/ Streak

July: 12–18 (Home: 3–8; Away: 9–10)

#	Date	Time (ET)	Opponent	Score	Win	Loss	Save	Time of Game	Attendance	Record	Box/ Streak
—	July 24	8:30 p.m. EDT	44th All-Star Game	National League vs. American League (Royals Stadium, Kansas City, Missouri)							

August: 18–14 (Home: 14–8; Away: 4–6)

#	Date	Time (ET)	Opponent	Score	Win	Loss	Save	Time of Game	Attendance	Record	Box/ Streak

September: 19–8 (Home: 11–3; Away: 8–5)

#	Date	Time (ET)	Opponent	Score	Win	Loss	Save	Time of Game	Attendance	Record	Box/ Streak

October: 1–0 (Home: 0–0; Away: 1–0)

#	Date	Time (ET)	Opponent	Score	Win	Loss	Save	Time of Game	Attendance	Record	Box/ Streak

== Playoffs ==
=== Game log ===
Legend
Mets Win	Mets Loss
Bold = Mets team member

1973 Postseason game log: 6–6 (Home: 4–2; Away: 2–4)
NL Championship Series: vs. Cincinnati Reds 3–2 (Home: 2–1; Away: 1–1)

#	Date	Time (ET)	Opponent	Score	Win	Loss	Save	Time of Game	Location (Attendance)	Series	Box/ Streak

World Series: vs. Oakland Athletics 3–4 (Home: 2–1; Away: 1–3)

#	Date	Time (ET)	Opponent	Score	Win	Loss	Save	Time of Game	Location (Attendance)	Series	Box/ Streak
1	October 13	4:00 p.m. EDT	@ Athletics	1–2	Holtzman (1–0)	**Matlack** (0–1)	Knowles (1)	2:26	Oakland–Alameda County Coliseum (46,021)	OAK 1–0	L1
2	October 14	4:30 p.m. EDT	@ Athletics	10–7 (12)	**McGraw** (1–0)	Fingers (0–1)	**Stone** (1)	4:13	Oakland–Alameda County Coliseum (49,151)	TIE 1–1	W1
3	October 16	8:30 p.m. EDT	Athletics	2–3 (11)	Lindblad (1–0)	**Parker** (0–1)	Fingers (1)	3:15	**Shea Stadium** (54,817)	OAK 2–1	L1
4	October 17	8:30 p.m. EDT	Athletics	6–1	**Matlack** (1–1)	Holtzman (1–1)	**Sadecki** (1)	2:41	**Shea Stadium** (54,817)	TIE 2–2	W1
5	October 18	8:30 p.m. EDT	Athletics	2–0	**Koosman** (1–0)	Blue (0–1)	**McGraw** (1)	2:39	**Shea Stadium** (54,817)	NYN 3–2	W2
6	October 20	4:00 p.m. EDT	@ Athletics	1–3	Hunter (1–0)	**Seaver** (0–1)	Fingers (2)	2:07	Oakland–Alameda County Coliseum (49,333)	TIE 3–3	L1
7	October 21	4:30 p.m. EDT	@ Athletics	2–5	Holtzman (2–1)	**Matlack** (1–2)	Knowles (2)	2:37	Oakland–Alameda County Coliseum (49,333)	OAK 4–3	L2

== Player stats ==
=== Batting ===
==== Starters by position ====
Note: Pos = Position; G = Games played; AB = At bats; H = Hits; Avg. = Batting average; HR = Home runs; RBI = Runs batted in

Pos	Player	G	AB	H	Avg.	HR	RBI
C	Jerry Grote	84	285	73	.256	1	32
1B	John Milner	129	451	108	.239	23	72
2B	Félix Millán	153	638	185	.290	3	37
SS	Bud Harrelson	106	356	92	.258	0	20
3B	Wayne Garrett	140	504	129	.256	16	58
LF	Cleon Jones	92	339	88	.260	11	48
CF	Don Hahn	93	262	60	.229	2	21
RF	Rusty Staub	152	585	163	.279	15	76

==== Other batters ====
Note: G = Games played; AB = At bats; H = Hits; Avg. = Batting average; HR = Home runs; RBI = Runs batted in

Pos	Player	G	AB	H	Avg.	HR	RBI
1B-LF	Ed Kranepool	100	284	68	.239	1	35
SS-OF	Ted Martinez	92	263	67	.255	1	14
CF-1B	Willie Mays	66	209	44	.211	6	25
C	Duffy Dyer	70	189	35	.185	1	9
C	Ron Hodges	45	127	33	.260	1	18
3B-SS	Jim Fregosi	45	124	29	.234	0	11
LF	George Theodore	45	116	30	.259	1	15
3B	Ken Boswell	76	110	25	.227	2	14
OF	Jim Gosger	38	92	22	.239	0	10
1B	Jim Beauchamp	50	61	17	.279	0	14
CF	Dave Schneck	13	36	7	.194	0	0
CF	Rich Chiles	8	25	3	.120	0	1
C	Jerry May	4	8	2	.250	0	0
SS	Brian Ostrosser	4	5	0	.000	0	0
PH-PR	Greg Harts	3	2	1	.500	0	0
PH-PR	Lute Barnes	3	2	1	.500	0	1

=== Pitching ===
==== Starting pitchers ====
Note: G = Games pitched; IP = Innings pitched; W = Wins; L = Losses; ERA = Earned run average; SO = Strikeouts

Player	G	IP	W	L	ERA	SO
Tom Seaver	36	290.0	19	10	2.08	251
Jerry Koosman	35	263.0	14	15	2.84	156
Jon Matlack	34	242.0	14	16	3.20	205

==== Other pitchers ====
Note: G = Games pitched; IP = Innings pitched; W = Wins; L = Losses; ERA = Earned run average; SO = Strikeouts

Player	G	IP	W	L	ERA	SO
George Stone	27	148.0	12	3	2.80	77
Ray Sadecki	31	116.2	5	4	3.39	87
Harry Parker	38	96.2	8	4	3.35	63
Jim McAndrew	23	80.1	3	8	5.38	38
Craig Swan	3	8.1	0	1	8.64	4
Tommy Moore	3	3.1	0	1	10.80	1

==== Relief pitchers ====
Note: G = Games pitched; W = Wins; L = Losses; SV = Saves; ERA = Earned run average; SO = Strikeouts

Player	G	W	L	SV	ERA	SO
Tug McGraw	60	5	6	25	3.87	81
Phil Hennigan	30	0	4	3	6.23	22
Buzz Capra	24	2	7	4	3.86	35
John Strohmayer	7	0	0	0	8.10	5
Hank Webb	2	0	0	0	10.80	1
Bob Miller	1	0	0	0	0.00	1
Bob Apodaca	1	0	0	0	inf	0

== Postseason ==
=== NLCS ===
==== Game 1 ====
October 6: Riverfront Stadium, Cincinnati

Team	1	2	3	4	5	6	7	8	9	R	H	E
New York	0	1	0	0	0	0	0	0	0	1	3	0
Cincinnati	0	0	0	0	0	0	0	1	1	2	6	0
W: Pedro Borbón (1–0) L: Tom Seaver (0–1) S: None
HR: NYM – None CIN – Pete Rose (1), Johnny Bench (1)
Pitchers: NYM – Seaver CIN – Billingham, Hall (9), Borbón (9)
Attendance: 53,431

==== Game 2 ====
October 7: Riverfront Stadium, Cincinnati

Team	1	2	3	4	5	6	7	8	9	R	H	E
New York	0	0	0	1	0	0	0	0	4	5	7	0
Cincinnati	0	0	0	0	0	0	0	0	0	0	2	0
W: Jon Matlack (1–0) L: Don Gullett (0–1) S: None
HR: NYM – Rusty Staub (1) CIN – None
Pitchers: NYM – Matlack CIN – Gullett, Carroll (6), Hall (9), Borbón (9)
Attendance: 54,041

==== Game 3 ====
October 8: Shea Stadium, New York City

Team	1	2	3	4	5	6	7	8	9	R	H	E
Cincinnati	0	0	2	0	0	0	0	0	0	2	8	1
New York	1	5	1	2	0	0	0	0	x	9	11	1
W: Jerry Koosman (1–0) L: Ross Grimsley (0–1) S: None
HR: CIN – Denis Menke (1) NYM – Rusty Staub (2), (3)
Pitchers: CIN – Grimsley, Hall (2), Tomlin (3), Nelson (4), Borbón (7) NYM – Koosman
Attendance: 53,967

==== Game 4 ====
October 9: Shea Stadium, New York City

Team	1	2	3	4	5	6	7	8	9	10	11	12	R	H	E
Cincinnati	0	0	0	0	0	0	1	0	0	0	0	1	2	8	0
New York	0	0	1	0	0	0	0	0	0	0	0	0	1	3	1
W: Clay Carroll (1–0) L: Harry Parker (0–1) S: Pedro Borbón (1)
HR: CIN – Tony Pérez (1), Pete Rose (2) NYM – None
Pitchers: CIN – Norman, Gullett (6), Carroll (10), Borbón (12) NYM – Stone, McGraw (7), Parker (12)
Attendance: 50,786

==== Game 5 ====
October 10: Shea Stadium, New York City

Team	1	2	3	4	5	6	7	8	9	R	H	E
Cincinnati	0	0	1	0	1	0	0	0	0	2	7	1
New York	2	0	0	0	4	1	0	0	x	7	13	1
W: Tom Seaver (1–1) L: Jack Billingham (0–1) S: Tug McGraw (1)
HR: CIN – None NYM – None
Pitchers: CIN – Billingham, Gullett (5), Carroll (5), Grimsley (7) NYM – Seaver, McGraw (9)
Attendance: 50,323

=== World Series ===
AL Oakland Athletics (4) vs. NL New York Mets (3)
Game	Score	Date	Location	Attendance	Time of Game
1	Mets – 1, A's – 2	October 13	Oakland–Alameda County Coliseum	46,021	2:26
2	Mets – 10, A's – 7 (12 inns)	October 14	Oakland–Alameda County Coliseum	55,989	4:13
3	A's – 3, Mets – 2 (11 inns)	October 16	Shea Stadium	54,817	3:15
4	A's – 1, Mets – 6	October 17	Shea Stadium	54,817	2:41
5	A's – 0, Mets – 2	October 18	Shea Stadium	54,817	2:39
6	Mets – 1, A's – 3	October 20	Oakland–Alameda County Coliseum	49,333	2:07
7	Mets – 2, A's – 5	October 21	Oakland–Alameda County Coliseum	49,333	2:37

== Awards and honors ==
- Cy Young Award – Tom Seaver
- Jerry Koosman – Player of the Month, April 1973

=== All-Stars ===
All-Star Game

- Tom Seaver
- Willie Mays

== Farm system ==
Level	Team	League	Manager
AAA	Tidewater Tides	International League	John Antonelli
AA	Memphis Blues	Texas League	Joe Frazier
A	Visalia Mets	California League	Nolan Campbell
A	Pompano Beach Mets	Florida State League	Gordon Mackenzie
A-Short Season	Batavia Trojans	New York–Penn League	Wilbur Huckle
Rookie	Marion Mets	Appalachian League	Owen Friend

LEAGUE CHAMPIONS: Memphis
