= Greg Harts =

American baseball player (born 1950)

- Outfielder
- Born: April 21, 1950 (age 76); Atlanta, Georgia, U.S.
- Batted: Left Threw: Left

MLB debut
- September 15, 1973, for the New York Mets

Last MLB appearance
- September 20, 1973, for the New York Mets

MLB statistics
- Batting average: .500
- Home runs: 0
- Runs batted in: 0
- Stats at Baseball Reference

Teams
- New York Mets (1973)

Gregory Rudolph Harts (born April 21, 1950) is an American former professional baseball player who played for the National League champion New York Mets in 1973. Although he never played the field in the Major Leagues, in the minor leagues he was primarily an outfielder.

Harts was signed by the Mets as an amateur free agent in 1970. He spent most of the 1971 season with the Marion Mets in the Rookie League but also played 5 games for the Single-A Pompano Beach Mets. He spent the 1971 season with the Single-A Visalia Mets. Harts began the 1972 season with the AA Memphis Blues but was sent down to the Visalia in May. Memphis manager Johnny Antonelli said of him before 1972 the season started "He's got good speed and a good arm. I wasn't worried about his defensive ability after watching him in the Instructional League. His hitting has been very satisfactory since he reported to us. So he has a chance to make the club. It depends a great deal on who Tidewater sends to us." He was added to the Mets' 40-man roster after the 1972 season.

In spring training of 1973 he competed with Don Hahn, Rich Chiles and Dave Schneck to back up 42-year-old expected-starter Willie Mays in center field for the Mets, but ended up being sent down to the Blues before being recalled to the Mets in September. Harts made his Major League debut as a pinch hitter for the Mets on September 15, 1973 at Shea Stadium against the Chicago Cubs, batting for pitcher Buzz Capra. He has the distinction of getting a hit in his first major league at bat. However, he only had one other at bat in 1973, in which he grounded out, and never played in the Major Leagues again. When the Mets moved into first place in the National League Eastern Division in late September for the first time and the large, jubilant home crowd started chanting, Mets' pitcher Tom Seaver said of him and young pitcher Bob Apodaca that "Some of these young kids were absolutely awed by the whole thing. They'd never seen a crowd like this. I think it scared them a little.

In 1974 Harts began the season with the AAA Tidewater Tides but was sent down to the AA Victoria Toros after batting less than .200 in 35 games with Tidewater. Harts was outrighted to Tidewater at the end of the season, removing him from the Mets' 40-man roster. An attempt to become a pitcher in the minor leagues in 1975 did not result in a Major League pitching career.

He was nicknamed "The Peanut Man."
