= Mike Andrews =

American baseball player (born 1943)

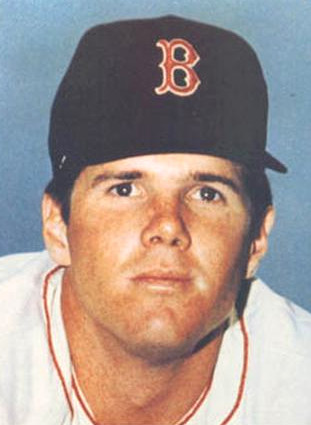
- Second baseman
- Born: July 9, 1943 (age 83); Los Angeles, California, U.S.
- Batted: Right Threw: Right

Professional debut
- MLB: September 18, 1966, for the Boston Red Sox
- NPB: April 5, 1975, for the Kintetsu Buffaloes

Last appearance
- MLB: September 29, 1973, for the Oakland Athletics
- NPB: October 4, 1975, for the Kintetsu Buffaloes

MLB statistics
- Batting average: .258
- Home runs: 66
- Runs batted in: 316

NPB statistics
- Batting average: .231
- Home runs: 12
- Runs batted in: 40
- Stats at Baseball Reference

Teams
- Boston Red Sox (1966–1970); Chicago White Sox (1971–1973); Oakland Athletics (1973); Kintetsu Buffaloes (1975)

Career highlights and awards
- All-Star (1969); World Series champion (1973)

Michael Jay Andrews (born July 9, 1943) is an American former professional baseball player. He played in Major League Baseball as an infielder for the Boston Red Sox, Chicago White Sox and Oakland Athletics. After his playing career, he served for more than 25 years as chairman of The Jimmy Fund, an event fundraising organization affiliated with the Dana–Farber Cancer Institute in Boston, Massachusetts. He is the older brother of Rob Andrews, who played five seasons in MLB from 1975 through 1979.

== Early life ==
Andrews grew up in Torrance, California, attending the city's South High School, starring in baseball, football and basketball. After he accepted a full football scholarship to the University of California, Los Angeles (UCLA), that required a one-year enrollment at a junior college to complete foreign language courses, he matriculated at El Camino College, earning Junior College All-American honors as a wide receiver.

== Baseball career ==
His baseball skills drew the attention of the Red Sox, who signed him as an amateur free agent with a $12,000 signing bonus on December 1, 1961. He spent the next five years working his way through the Red Sox farm system, the first four as a shortstop. He excelled at the plate in his first three seasons, batting .299 with the Class D Olean (NY) Red Sox of the New York–Penn League in 1962, .298 combined between the Waterloo Hawks and Winston-Salem Red Sox in 1963 and .295 with the Reading Red Sox in 1964. However, he struggled with his defense, committing 74, 36 and 42 errors in those respective campaigns. He spent his last two years in the minors with the Toronto Maple Leafs, back-to-back Governors' Cup Champions managed by Dick Williams. After his batting average fell to .246 in 1965, Andrews was shifted to second base and responded by hitting .267, with 14 homers and an International League-leading 97 runs scored in 1966.

He was promoted in September 1966 to a Boston team that avoided the American League cellar by only 1/2 game. Playing in five contests, all as a starter. He made his major league debut on September 18 against the California Angels at Fenway Park, going hitless in four at bats with a run scored. He got his first hit in the majors six days later at Yankee Stadium, a single off New York's Fritz Peterson. Andrews picked up two more hits in the season finale versus the Chicago White Sox at Comiskey Park.

Even though he was reunited with the newly promoted Williams in 1967, Andrews started his rookie season on the bench in favor of Reggie Smith, who had been shifted from center field. By late April, Andrews became the regular second baseman for the majority of the campaign, with Smith, struggling defensively, returning to his original position.

Andrews was traded along with Luis Alvarado to the White Sox for Luis Aparicio on December 1, 1970. Andrews hit just .237 for the White Sox, and was released on July 16, 1973, with a batting average that season of just .201.

=== 1973 World Series ===
In a transaction requested by his old manager Dick Williams despite the objections of team owner Charlie Finley, Andrews signed with the Oakland Athletics on July 31, 1973. A part of the ballclub's postseason roster, he appeared in two games of the American League Championship Series, entering both as a pinch hitter.

In Game 2 of the 1973 World Series between the Oakland A's and the New York Mets, Andrews committed two errors in a four-run twelfth inning, leading to a Mets' 10–7 victory. With two outs and the Mets leading 7–6, John Milner's ground ball went through Andrews's legs for the first error, allowing Tug McGraw and Willie Mays to score. One batter later, Jerry Grote hit a ground ball to Andrews, whose throw to first pulled Gene Tenace off the bag for the second error, which allowed Cleon Jones to score. Finley subsequently forced Andrews to sign a false affidavit saying he was injured, thus making him ineligible to play for the rest of the series. Andrews's teammates and Williams rallied to Andrews's defense, including placing his number "17" onto their uniforms with athletic tape as a display of solidarity. Finally, commissioner Bowie Kuhn forced Finley to reinstate Andrews. He entered Game 4 in the eighth inning as a pinch-hitter to a standing ovation from sympathetic Mets fans. Andrews promptly grounded out, and Finley ordered him benched for the remainder of the Series. He was given his unconditional release on November 1, eleven days after the A's won their second straight World Series title. Andrews never played another major league game, playing baseball in Japan in 1975 before retiring.

== The Jimmy Fund ==
Andrews's first contact with The Jimmy Fund was in his rookie season with the Red Sox in 1967 when Bill Koster, then the charity's chairman, asked him if he could meet with a twelve-year-old cancer patient. Andrews agreed and spent half an hour with the youth. After the meeting, he talked about the boy's optimism with Koster, who then informed him that the youngster was being released because his condition was terminal and the doctors had no cure for the disease.

In 1979, Andrews received an offer from Ken Coleman, The Jimmy Fund's executive director at the time, to become its assistant director. He accepted under the condition that the job be part-time because he was still working for the Massachusetts Mutual Life Insurance Company, which he had joined after his professional baseball career ended. He eventually left the insurance business and served full-time with the fund, becoming its chairman in 1984. He retired from the position at the end of 2009.
