= Wayne Garrett =

American baseball player (born 1947)

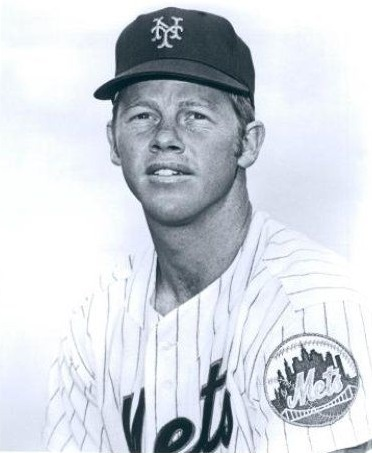
- Garrett in 1971
- Third baseman
- Born: December 3, 1947 (age 78); Brooksville, Florida, U.S.
- Batted: Left Threw: Right

Professional debut
- MLB: April 12, 1969, for the New York Mets
- NPB: April 7, 1979, for the Chunichi Dragons

Last appearance
- MLB: September 26, 1978, for the St. Louis Cardinals
- NPB: August 28, 1980, for the Chunichi Dragons

MLB statistics
- Batting average: .239
- Home runs: 61
- Runs batted in: 340

NPB statistics
- Batting average: .241
- Home runs: 28
- Runs batted in: 93
- Stats at Baseball Reference

Teams
- New York Mets (1969–1976); Montreal Expos (1976–1978); St. Louis Cardinals (1978); Chunichi Dragons (1979–1980)

Career highlights and awards
- World Series champion (1969)

Ronald Wayne Garrett (born December 3, 1947) is an American former professional baseball player. He played in Major League Baseball (MLB) as a third baseman from 1969 to 1980, most prominently as a member of the New York Mets, where he was a member of the 1969 World Series winning team known as the "Miracle Mets". He also played for the Montreal Expos and the St. Louis Cardinals. Garrett played his final two seasons of professional baseball in the Nippon Professional Baseball league with the Chunichi Dragons.

== Braves organization ==
Garrett followed his brothers Adrian and James Garrett in the Milwaukee Braves organization when he was their sixth-round selection in the 1965 Major League Baseball draft. Hailing from Brooksville, Florida, Garrett was a fan favorite on the Florida Rookie League Braves, who played in nearby Sarasota. Originally a shortstop when he was signed, Garrett was a good fielder, but only managed a .222 batting average in the Braves' farm system. On December 2, 1968, he was selected by the New York Mets in the Rule 5 draft.

== New York Mets ==
=== Amazin' Mets ===
Garrett made his major league debut at second base, and played most of his first month in the majors there. Shortly afterwards, the 21 year-old lefty hitter settled into a lefty-righty platoon with Ed Charles at third base. He batted just .218 with one home run his rookie season; however, he would match that home run total in the 1969 National League Championship Series against his former franchise. With the Atlanta Braves leading 4–3 in the fifth inning of game three, Garrett hit a go-ahead two run home run to seal the three-game sweep for the Mets. For the NLCS, Garrett batted .385 with three runs batted in and three runs scored. He struck out in his only official at-bat in the World Series.

=== Continued search for a third baseman ===
Ed Charles retired after the World Series. On December 3, 1969, the Mets sent Amos Otis and Bob Johnson to the Kansas City Royals for third baseman Joe Foy. While shifted into more of a utility infielder role, making 34 starts at second base, Garrett put up better numbers than Foy, who was gone after just one season in New York. Following the 1970 season, Garrett went into the military with the Bayside National Guard, and the Mets acquired Bob Aspromonte from the Braves for Ron Herbel.

After completing his military obligation and a brief stop at triple A Tidewater, Garrett rejoined his team midway through the 1971 season. He hit the ground running, going 3-for-5 with two runs batted in (RBI) and three runs scored in his first game back, and 2-for-3 with two walks and an RBI in his second, but he soon cooled off. An 0-for-29 skid at the end of the season saw his batting average drop to .213. Following the season, the Mets sent a package of young prospects that included Nolan Ryan to the California Angels for perennial All-Star third baseman Jim Fregosi.

Garrett and Fregosi produced identical .232 batting averages in 1972, and combined for seven home runs and 61 RBIs platooning at third. Fregosi's tenure in New York lasted until midway through the 1973 season before his contract was sold to the Texas Rangers.

=== Ya Gotta Believe! ===
At the time of the deal, Garrett was batting .233 with six home runs and 27 RBIs. He batted .277 with 10 home runs and 31 RBIs over the remainder of the season. He led off the Mets' September 7 contest with the Montreal Expos with a solo home run that turned out to be the only run of the game. On September 13, his extra innings pinch-hit single drove in the winning run against the Philadelphia Phillies. From September 17 to September 21, the Mets played a crucial five-game stretch against the Pittsburgh Pirates that would determine the National League East. The Mets won four of those five games, and went from 3.5 games back to first place by half a game. Garrett went 8-for-22 during that stretch with a home run, two RBIs and five runs scored. He was also at the center of one of the most famous plays in Mets folklore. Their September 20 match-up at Shea Stadium went into extra innings. The Pirates had Richie Zisk on first base when Dave Augustine hit what appeared to be a two-run home run to left. Instead, the ball hit the top of the wall, and caromed directly into left fielder Cleon Jones' glove. Jones fired a strike to Garrett as the cut-off man, who in turn, fired a strike to catcher Ron Hodges to nail Zisk at the plate. The Mets went on to win the game in the bottom of the inning.

Garrett went just 2-for-24 in the 1973 National League Championship Series against Cincinnati's "Big Red Machine," but one of those hits sparked the series-winning rally. With the score tied at two in the fifth and decisive game, Garrett led off the fifth inning with a double. The following batter, Félix Millán, laid down a sacrifice bunt. Rather than take the sure out at first base, Reds pitcher Jack Billingham threw to third, attempting to get the lead runner. Reds third baseman Dan Driessen tagged the base, not the runner, forgetting that there was no force on the play. Thereby, allowing both runners to be safe. The following batter, Cleon Jones, doubled to drive in Garrett with the lead run.

Garrett hit two home runs in the 1973 World Series against the Oakland Athletics. The first coming in the Mets' 10–7 game two victory, and the second came leading off game three. Aside from these two home runs, he did not have much success, however. He batted just .167, and tied Eddie Mathews' 1958 World Series record by striking out eleven times. He also made the final out of the Series. Representing the tying run, he popped out to shortstop Bert Campaneris to end the game.

=== 1974-1976 ===
After a career year in 1973, Garrett was finally handed the starting job at third for 1974. He appeared in a career high 151 games, and made a career high 619 plate appearances, but batted just .224 with 13 home runs. After the season, the Mets acquired former National League MVP Joe Torre from the St. Louis Cardinals for Tommy Moore and Ray Sadecki.

In 1975, Garrett batted .266 platooning with Torre at third. For 1976, Torre was shifted to first, and the third base job was split between Garrett and rookie Roy Staiger until midway through the season, when Garrett was dealt to the Montreal Expos with Del Unser for Pepe Mangual and Jim Dwyer.

== Montreal Expos ==
With the Expos, Garrett was shifted to second base. On September 29, Garrett hit his first career grand slam against the Mets at Shea. His career at second base was cut short when the Expos signed free agent second baseman Dave Cash after the season. He spent the remainder of his Expos career backing up Larry Parrish at third. On July 21, 1978, two years from the date that he was acquired from the Mets, the Expos sent Garrett to the St. Louis Cardinals for cash considerations. His one home run with the Cards was a pinch hit grand slam. Unable to come to an agreement on a contract for the 1979 season, Garrett decided to head to Japan, where his brother, Adrian, had been playing since 1977.

== Career statistics ==
Seasons	Games	PA	AB	Runs	Hits	2B	3B	HR	RBI	SB	BB	HBP	SO	Avg.	OBP	Slg.	Fld%
10	1092	3917	3285	438	786	107	22	61	340	38	561	12	529	.239	.350	.341	.963

Garrett played two seasons for the Chunichi Dragons. His first season in Nippon Professional Baseball, he hit a career-high twenty home runs and drove in a career high 71 runs. He also played for the Bradenton Explorers of the Senior Professional Baseball Association in its 1989 inaugural season.

Garrett played 711 games at third base for the Mets. It is the third-highest total, behind David Wright and Howard Johnson. Joe Foy, Bob Aspromonte, Jim Fregosi and Joe Torre combine for 384.

Garrett's home run in game three of the 1973 World Series is one of three leadoff home runs in New York Mets World Series history. Tommie Agee hit one in the 1969 World Series against the Baltimore Orioles; Lenny Dykstra hit his in the 1986 World Series against the Boston Red Sox. Coincidentally, their lead off home runs, like Garrett's, also occurred in game three.

Garrett's nephew Jason (Adrian's son), was drafted by and played four years in the Florida Marlins organization, reaching High-A in the minor leagues.
