= Ron Hodges =

American baseball player (1949–2023)

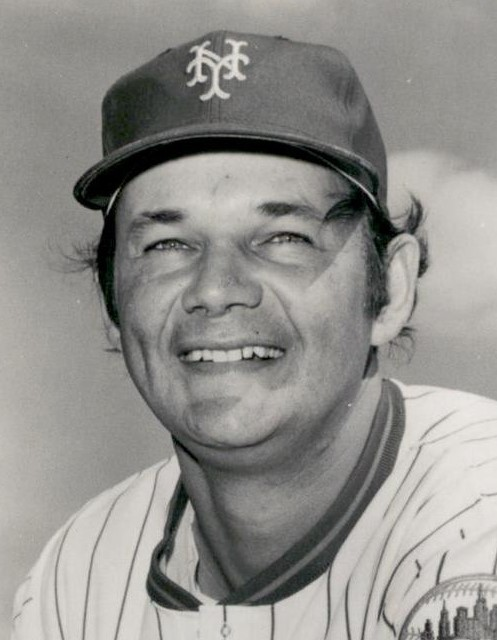
- Hodges in 1978
- Catcher
- Born: June 22, 1949; Rocky Mount, Virginia, U.S.
- Died: November 24, 2023 (aged 74); Roanoke, Virginia, U.S.
- Batted: Left Threw: Right

MLB debut
- June 13, 1973, for the New York Mets

Last MLB appearance
- September 30, 1984, for the New York Mets

MLB statistics
- Batting average: .240
- Home runs: 19
- Runs batted in: 147
- Stats at Baseball Reference

Teams
- New York Mets (1973–1984)

Ronald Wray Hodges (June 22, 1949 – November 24, 2023) was an American professional baseball player who spent his entire 12-year career as a catcher for the New York Mets of Major League Baseball (MLB). He batted lefty and threw righty.

Hodges was originally drafted by the Baltimore Orioles in the sixth round of the 1970 MLB draft, but did not sign. He was also drafted by the Kansas City Royals in the first round (15th pick) of the 1971 amateur draft (secondary phase), and the Atlanta Braves in the first round (tenth overall) of the 1971 amateur draft (secondary phase active), but chose not to sign with either of those teams. Eventually, he signed with the Mets in the Secondary Phase of the 1972 amateur draft.

== Rookie year ==
Despite batting just .173 with one home run and eleven runs batted in for the double A Memphis Blues, Hodges was brought up to the majors midway through his second professional season when injuries afflicted the Mets' other catchers, Jerry Grote and Duffy Dyer. He made his major league debut against the San Francisco Giants on June 13, 1973, catching a complete game by Tom Seaver, and collected his first major league hit in the seventh off Tom Bradley. Four days later, he hit his first career home run off the San Diego Padres' Bill Greif.

Hodges stayed with the Mets for the remainder of the season, batting .260 with eighteen RBIs and just the one home run. He was involved in one of the most famous plays in Mets folklore when their September 20 match-up against the Pittsburgh Pirates at Shea Stadium went into extra innings. In the top of the thirteenth inning, the Pirates had Richie Zisk on first base when Dave Augustine hit what appeared to be a two-run home run to left. Instead, the ball hit the top of the wall and caromed directly into left fielder Cleon Jones' glove. Jones fired a strike to Wayne Garrett as the cut-off man, who in turn, fired a strike to Hodges to nail Zisk at the plate. In the bottom of the inning, Hodges singled in the winning run as part of a three game sweep the landed the Mets in first place in the National League East.

He was on the Mets' postseason roster in 1973 and played in one game in the 1973 World Series, drawing a walk in his only plate appearance.

== Back up catcher ==
Hodges shared back up catcher duties with Dyer in 1974. After the season, the Mets dealt Dyer to the Pirates, and acquired catching prospect John Stearns from the Philadelphia Phillies. Stearns served as Grote's primary back up in 1975, while Hodges spent most of the season in triple A Tidewater, appearing in just nine games that September.

The Mets carried three catchers in 1976, and part of 1977, until Grote was dealt to the Los Angeles Dodgers on August 31. At which point, Hodges became the primary back up to Stearns. He would spend the rest of his career as Stearns' back up, seeing more and more playing time as injuries plagued the second half of Stearns' career. He had career high five home runs and 27 RBIs in 1982.

== Career statistics ==
Games	PA	AB	Runs	Hits	2B	3B	HR	RBI	SB	BB	SO	HBP	Avg.	Slg.	OBP	Fld%	CS%
666	1683	1426	119	342	56	2	19	147	10	224	217	4	.240	.342	.322	.978	31%

Hodges sold Real-Estate at "Mountain To Lake" in Rocky Mount, Virginia for thirty years following his playing career. He died at Carilion Roanoke Memorial Hospital in Roanoke, Virginia, on November 24, 2023, at the age of 74. He is survived by his wife, Peggy; sons Riley, Gray, Nat and Casey and two grandchildren. All four of his sons played college baseball.

== See also ==
- List of Major League Baseball players who spent their entire career with one franchise
