= Phil Hennigan =

American baseball player (1946–2016)

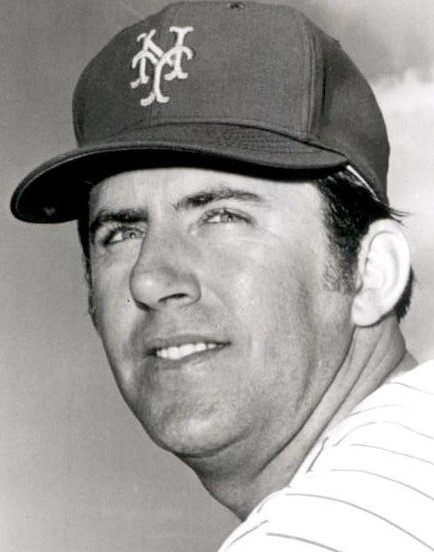
- Pitcher
- Born: April 10, 1946; Jasper, Texas, U.S.
- Died: June 17, 2016 (aged 70); Center, Texas, U.S.
- Batted: Right Threw: Right

MLB debut
- September 2, 1969, for the Cleveland Indians

Last MLB appearance
- July 7, 1973, for the New York Mets

MLB statistics
- Win–loss record: 17–14
- Earned run average: 4.26
- Strikeouts: 188
- Stats at Baseball Reference

Teams
- Cleveland Indians (1969–1972); New York Mets (1973)

Phillip Winston Hennigan (April 10, 1946 – June 17, 2016) was an American professional baseball right-handed pitcher who played in Major League Baseball (MLB) from 1969 to 1973 with the Cleveland Indians and New York Mets.

== Early life ==
Hennigan was born in Jasper, Texas. He attended Jasper High School in Jasper, and then Sam Houston State University. Hennigan served in the United States Army and deployed as an artilleryman in the Vietnam War, where he received a medal for bravery. He returned in January 1968.

== Professional career ==
Drafted by the Cleveland Indians in the fourth round of the 1966 draft, Hennigan began his professional career that same year. Pitching for the Reno Silver Sox, Hennigan went 3–8 with a 4.03 ERA and 82 strikeouts in 96 innings of work.

He missed all of the 1967 campaign due to military service.

In 1968, he pitched for Reno again, going 5–7 with a 3.26 ERA in 80 innings, striking out 76 batters and walking 32.

In 1969, he mostly pitched for the Waterbury Indians although he saw a few games in the majors. With the Waterbury Indians, he went 10–10 with a 3.39 ERA and 114 strikeouts in 154 innings of work.

He made his Major League Baseball debut on September 2 of that year, pitching a third of an inning against the Minnesota Twins. The single batter he faced in that game (and the first batter he ever faced in the majors) was Hall of Famer Rod Carew, who flew out to center. Overall, he went 2–1 with a 3.31 ERA in nine relief appearances in his rookie season.

Hennigan made 41 relief appearances and one start for the Indians in 1970, going 6–3 with a 4.02 ERA, 43 strikeouts and 44 walks in 71 2/3 innings of work. He spent seven games with the Wichita Aeros that year as well, going 2–2 with an 8.00 ERA in 27 innings of work.

In 1971, Hennigan went 4–3 with a 4.94 ERA in 57 relief appearances. His 57 appearances led the team, and were fifth overall in the league. He was also eighth in the league with 14 saves and fourth with 38 games finished. He also appeared in seven games for Wichita that year, going 1–0 with a 1.80 ERA in 15 innings.

Although 1972 was arguably Hennigan's best season, it would also be his last with the Indians. In 38 games, he went 5–3 with a 2.67 ERA. In 67 1/3 innings of work, he struck out 44 batters, walking only 18, and also saved five games.

He was traded from the Indians to the Mets for Brent Strom and Bob Rauch at the Winter Meetings on November 27, 1972. He appeared in 30 games with the Mets in 1973, going 0–4 with a 6.23 ERA and pitched in his final big league game on July 7, 1973. In that last appearance, he came into the game in the 7th inning. Hennigan gave up an inside-the-park home run to Atlanta's Ralph Garr, which happened when Met outfielders Don Hahn and George Theodore violently collided in Left-Center field.

Overall, Hennigan went 17–14 with a 4.26 ERA through five big league seasons.

In 176 games, he pitched 280 2/3 innings, walking 133 batters and striking out 188. He saved 25 games and finished exactly 100. As a batter, he collected three hits in 30 at-bats for a .100 average. His first hit was the only extra base hit of his career, a double off Bob Locker. He committed only one error for a .980 fielding percentage.

In the minors, he went 21–27 with a 3.80 ERA.

Hennigan died on June 17, 2016, a year after being diagnosed with lung cancer.
