= Ken Boswell =

American baseball player (born 1946)

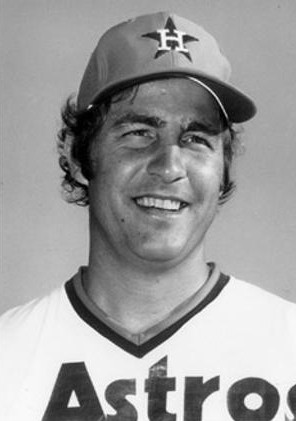
- Boswell in 1976
- Second baseman
- Born: February 23, 1946 (age 80); Austin, Texas, U.S.
- Batted: Left Threw: Right

MLB debut
- September 18, 1967, for the New York Mets

Last MLB appearance
- October 1, 1977, for the Houston Astros

MLB statistics
- Batting average: .248
- Home runs: 31
- Runs batted in: 244
- Stats at Baseball Reference

Teams
- New York Mets (1967–1974); Houston Astros (1975–1977)

Career highlights and awards
- World Series champion (1969)

Kenneth George Boswell (born February 23, 1946) is an American former Major League Baseball second baseman.

== Early life ==
Ken Boswell attended William B. Travis High School (Austin, Texas) and then the Mets drafted the Sam Houston State University student in the fourth round of the 1965 Major League Baseball draft. In three seasons in the a Mets' farm system, Boswell batted .273 with thirteen home runs and 106 runs batted in to earn a September call-up in 1967.

== Career ==
=== Topps All-Star Rookie ===
Despite limited experience at third base, Boswell made his major league debut on September 18 at third against the Los Angeles Dodgers. He handle all three chances on the field cleanly, and went 1-for-3 with a sacrifice fly and a double and three RBIs. For the season, he batted .225 with four RBIs. On September 29, Boswell went 3-for-4 in the Mets' 5–1 defeat of the Dodgers. The following day, he hit his first major league home run off Hall of Famer Don Drysdale.

Boswell spent the 1968 season in a lefty/righty platoon at second base with Phil Linz. He batted .246 with four home runs and ten RBIs through June 24 when a broken finger sidelined him for the month of July and most of August. By season's end, he managed to raise his batting average up to .261 to be recognized as the Topps All-Star Rookie Team second baseman.

=== Amazin' Mets ===
1969 got off to a terrible start for Boswell. In the season opener, and first game in franchise history for the Montreal Expos, Boswell booted a first inning ground ball from Gary Sutherland that led to the first (unearned) run in the history of Canadian baseball. He committed a second error in the first on Bob Bailey's double that allowed him to advance to third. He also committed an error on a Coco Laboy ground ball in the fifth, giving him three errors on the day.

Boswell batted .250 with two home runs and eleven RBIs through the end of May when he left the club for a two-week military commitment. At the time, the Mets were 19–23, in third place in the National League East, nine games back of the Chicago Cubs. When he returned, the Mets were 30–26, and had jumped into second place, but were still 8.5 back of the Cubs.

In his first game back, Boswell scored the only run in Gary Gentry's 1–0 shutout of the Philadelphia Phillies. Two days later, his two out single in the ninth inning drove in the tying and winning runs of the Mets' 6–5 victory over the Phillies. His knack for key hits continued on July 2, when he drove in the winning run and scored an insurance run in an extra innings contest with the St. Louis Cardinals.

The Mets were 5.5 games back when they hosted the Cubs for a three-game set July 8–10. The Mets were losing the first game of the set 3–1 to Ferguson Jenkins when Boswell pinch hit for Jerry Koosman to lead off the ninth. He doubled, and came around to score on Cleon Jones' double. The Mets would go on to win 4–3.

Tom Seaver lost a pitchers' duel with Bill Hands in the series opener when it was the Cubs' turn to host the Mets July 14–16. The following day, Boswell's solo home run that put the Mets up 5–1 turned out to be the margin of victory in their 5–4 win. Then he drove Tommie Agee home with the first run, and came around to score on an Ed Kranepool single in the Mets' four run first inning in the rubber game of the series. He turned a double play in the bottom of the inning to thwart an early Cubs comeback. The game ended with Billy Williams and Ron Santo both popping out to Boswell at second. He also made a couple of base running errors that cost the Mets games.

From there, Boswell fell into an all around slump. From July 26 to August 23, Boswell went into an 0-for-20 slump. On July 30, his error opened the door for a ten-run third inning for the Houston Astros. He wouldn't take the field again until August 12, also against the Astros. In the sixth inning, he missed the relay on what would have been a double play. Instead, the Astros scored four runs that inning.

From August 23 to September 7, Boswell was one of the hottest hitters on the hottest club in baseball. He batted .486 with four RBIs and six runs scored. The Mets were 2.5 back with the Cubs coming to Shea for two games. Boswell was held hitless, and grounded into two double plays in the first game. Despite this, the Mets won, 3–2. The following day, Boswell went 2-for-4 with a double, two RBIs and a run scored in the Mets' 7–1 victory that moved them a half a game back of the Cubs.

The Mets played a doubleheader with the Expos the next day. The first game went into extra innings. Boswell ended it in the twelfth with an RBI single that put the Mets in first place for the first time in franchise history. In the second game, Boswell went 3-for-4 with a triple, RBI and run scored to make sure they stayed there.

=== 1969 postseason ===
Over the remainder of the season, Boswell batted .333 on his way to career highs in runs (48), triples (7), batting average (.279) and slugging percentage (.381).

In game one of the 1969 National League Championship Series against the Atlanta Braves, Boswell made a second-inning error that led to the Braves' first run. Coincidentally, he scored an unearned run in the Mets' five-run eighth that highlighted their game one win.

He hit a two-run home run off Milt Pappas in game two, as the Mets headed home in the series up 2–0. He drove in three in game three with a second two-run blast in the fourth and an RBI single in the fifth to help the Mets complete the sweep. His five RBIs led the team.

With left-handers Mike Cuellar and Dave McNally pitching the first two games of the World Series for the Baltimore Orioles, Boswell didn't get a World Series at bat until game three against Jim Palmer. He singled, and came around to score a run on Jerry Grote's double. It would turn out to be his only appearance in the Mets' five-game win.

=== 85-game errorless streak ===
Aware that he was something of a defensive liability his first two seasons in the majors, Boswell worked on his defense heading into the 1970 season. His hard work culminated in a record 85-game errorless streak. He only committed two errors on the season, and had an incredible .996 fielding percentage. With the bat, Boswell had a career high 44 RBIs and walked a career-high 41 times.

Heading into May, Boswell was batting below .200 when he went 3-for-5, and scored the game-winning run of the Mets' extra-innings 6–5 defeat of the Astros. From July 15 to July 25, Boswell engaged in a ten-game hitting streak in which he batted .439 with eight RBIs and eight runs scored. Shoulder tendinitis hampered him toward the end of the season, but he still had a career-high 107 hits in a career-high 116 games.

The shoulder issues continued into 1972. He was batting just .187 when a stretch from June 25 through July 31, in which Boswell went 1-for 37, dropped his average to .155. A hot month of September brought his average above .200, and on the last day of the season, Boswell went 4-for-6 with three RBIs, including the game winner. This performance brought his season average up to .210, a 63-point drop from the previous season. He had a career-high nine home runs.

=== Ya gotta believe! ===
During the off-season, the Mets acquired Gold Glove second baseman Félix Millán from the Braves. The acquisition severely diminished Boswell's role, with most of his playing time coming either at third or as a pinch hitter.

The Mets returned to the postseason for the second time in Boswell's career. All four of his at bats in the 1973 National League Championship Series and 1973 World Series were as a pinch hitter. After grounding out in the NLCS, he was 3-for-3 in the World Series with a run scored.

Toward the end of the 1974 season, Mets manager Yogi Berra experimented with Boswell in the outfield. After the season, he was traded to the Astros for outfielder Bob Gallagher.

=== Houston Astros ===
In his first start with the Astros, Boswell went 3-for-4 with three RBIs and a run scored, but he spent the bulk of his three-year career with the Astros as a pinch hitter or late inning defensive replacement. In 1976, he set the franchise record with twenty pinch hits. He batted .242 in an Astros uniform. He had 457 plate appearances without a home run.

== Career statistics ==
Games	PA	AB	Runs	Hits	2B	3B	HR	RBI	SB	BB	SO	Avg.	OBP	Slg.	OPS	Fld%
930	2816	2517	266	625	91	19	31	244	27	240	239	.248	.313	.337	.650	.975

Former Mets second baseman and manager Willie Randolph wore number 12 in Boswell's honor while with the Dodgers and Mets, as Boswell was his favorite player growing up in Brooklyn, New York.
