= Mac Scarce =

American baseball player (born 1949)

- Pitcher
- Born: April 8, 1949 (age 77); Danville, Virginia, U.S.
- Batted: Left Threw: Left

MLB debut
- July 10, 1972, for the Philadelphia Phillies

Last MLB appearance
- June 25, 1978, for the Minnesota Twins

MLB statistics
- Win–loss record: 6–19
- Earned run average: 3.69
- Strikeouts: 164
- Stats at Baseball Reference

Teams
- Philadelphia Phillies (1972–1974); New York Mets (1975); Minnesota Twins (1978)

Guerrant McCurdy "Mac" Scarce (born April 8, 1949) is an American former professional baseball relief pitcher, who played in parts of five Major League Baseball (MLB) seasons from 1972–1978. During his short career, the 6 feet 3 inches (1.91 m) left-hander pitched for the Philadelphia Phillies, New York Mets, and Minnesota Twins. He attended John Randolph Tucker High School in Henrico County, Virginia and finished his collegiate career at Florida State University (FSU).

== Draft ==
Scarce, who batted and threw left-handed, was initially drafted by the Cincinnati Reds in the twenty-sixth round of the 1969 amateur draft, but elected not to sign. In 1971, Scarce was the Phillies’ eighth round selection (179 overall), subsequently signing on June 11, 1971.

== College and minor league career ==
Scarce first played college baseball for Manatee Junior College, in 1968 and 1969. He then transferred to FSU, pitching for the Seminoles in 1970 and 1971. Scarce was used as a relief pitcher, enjoying considerable success at the collegiate level, while racking up 30 saves (SV) over the two seasons. In 1970, he allowed only 13 hits in 33 innings, a school record. These achievements contributed significantly to the team's being able to advance to the national title game of the National Collegiate Athletic Association (NCAA) College World Series (CWS), where they were defeated by USC, 2–1. (See 1970 NCAA University Division baseball tournament.) In 1971, the lanky lefty was the squad's co-captain, recording 18 saves — which stood as the NCAA single-season record for some time.

Scarce advanced very rapidly and successfully through Minor League Baseball (MiLB). He spent part of the 1971 season with the Peninsula Phillies, in the A+ Carolina League, where he appeared in 20 games, compiling a 3–0 win–loss (W–L) record, and a 1.29 earned run average (ERA). In 1972, Scarce pitched for the Reading Phillies in the AA Eastern League, going 4–0 with a 0.46 ERA in 23 games. That same year, following a brief stint with the AAA Eugene Emeralds, the parent-club Phillies sent for him.

== Major league career ==
On July 10, 1972, at the age of 23, Scarce made his major league debut. He entered the game in Philadelphia in the eighth inning against the Los Angeles Dodgers and pitched 3-plus innings. He gave up a run in the ninth inning, allowing the Dodgers to tie the score 3–3. Then in the eleventh inning, he allowed hits to the first two batters (Tommy Davis and Manny Mota) and was lifted. Both Davis and Mota went on to score leading to the Dodgers 5–3 win. Scarce was given the loss.

After a season with a 3–8 record and a 5.01 ERA, Scarce was traded along with Del Unser and John Stearns from the Phillies to the Mets for Tug McGraw, Don Hahn and Dave Schneck at the Winter Meetings on December 3, 1974.

In his only appearance as a Met, on April 11, 1975, Scarce relieved Rick Baldwin in the bottom of the 9th inning against the Pittsburgh Pirates. With runners on 1st and 2nd and one out, Scarce gave up a game-winning single to Richie Hebner that scored Paul Popovich. Since Scarce never retired a batter as a Met, his ERA is listed as infinite. Four days later, Scarce was traded to Cincinnati for pitcher Tom Hall, but never appeared in a game for the Reds. Following the 1977 season, he declared free agency and was signed by the Minnesota Twins. He appeared in 17 games for the Twins in 1978, and played his last game on June 25, 1978. Following the season he was traded to the Texas Rangers for Mike Bacsik. However, Scarce never made the club (Texas had acquired Sparky Lyle that winter), and the Rangers released him.

Overall, Scarce appeared in 159 Major League baseball games and recorded 21 saves (all with the Phillies) and a 6–19 record. Arm problems curtailed his career; they began in 1974 and worsened that fall, when Scarce believes he tore his rotator cuff. Scarce never started a game and in his 17 major league at bats, he never got a hit.
