= George Theodore =

American baseball player (born 1947)

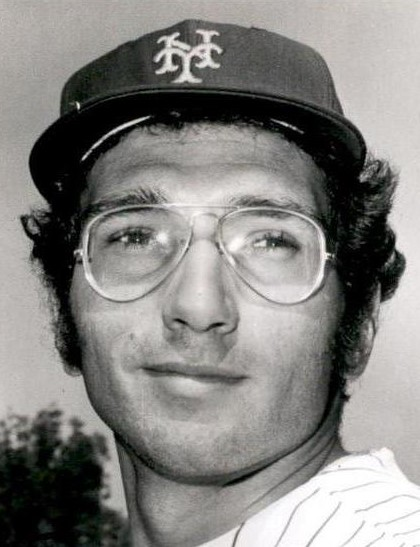
- Outfielder
- Born: November 13, 1947 (age 78); Salt Lake City, Utah, U.S.
- Batted: Right Threw: Right

MLB debut
- April 14, 1973, for the New York Mets

Last MLB appearance
- October 2, 1974, for the New York Mets

MLB statistics
- Batting average: .219
- Hits: 42
- Home runs: 2
- Stats at Baseball Reference

Teams
- New York Mets (1973–1974)

George Basil Theodore (born November 13, 1947) is an American former professional baseball outfielder. Nicknamed "the Stork", the 6 ft 4 in (1.93 m), 190 lb (86 kg) he played in Major League Baseball (MLB) for the New York Mets in 1973 and 1974. He is probably best remembered for a brutal collision in left-center field with Don Hahn.

His offbeat personality and idiosyncratic interviews made Theodore a fan favorite with Mets fans. For example, he once remarked, "I've been trying transcendental meditation, and that helps me be passive and wait on the curve. I've got to find something else to hit the slider."

== Early years ==
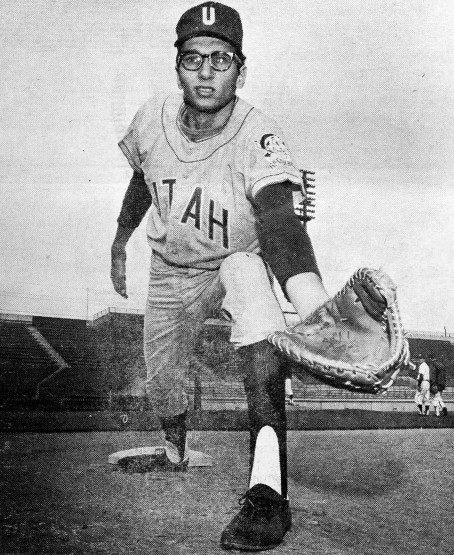
Theodore during his college days, circa 1968

The Salt Lake City native played basketball as well as baseball at Skyline High School. He was drafted by the Mets in the 31st round of the 1969 Major League Baseball draft out of the University of Utah.

Minor league teammate Jim Gosger, who came over to the Mets as the player to be named later in the deal that sent Greg Goossen to the Seattle Pilots, is credited with dubbing Theodore "The Stork", though Theodore disputes the longtime story that Gosger came up with the nickname when seeing him holding a teammate’s baby.

He batted .306 with 52 home runs & 285 Runs batted in over four seasons in the Mets' farm system, including earning California League "Player of the Year" honors for the Visalia Mets in 1971 (.333/.417/.584 with 28 HR & 113 RBIs).

== New York Mets ==
Theodore earned a bench job with the 1973 Mets. He made his major league debut as a late inning defensive replacement for Willie Mays on April 14. In his only at bat, Philadelphia Phillies ace Steve Carlton struck him out. His first hit was a double off the Chicago Cubs' Burt Hooton on April 19.

His first major league home run was a three run shot off the Montreal Expos' Balor Moore on the 4th of July. Three days later, Theodore suffered a season ending injury, colliding with center fielder Don Hahn on a fly ball off the bat of the Atlanta Braves' Ralph Garr. As a result of the collision, Garr scored an inside-the-park home run. Theodore dislocated his left hip and had to be carried off the field on a stretcher.

He returned for one game in September, and went 0 for 2 in two games of the World Series against the Oakland Athletics.

Theodore has a rough 1974 season (.158/.247/.211). His one home run and RBI was the first of back-to-back-to-back shots with Rusty Staub and Cleon Jones off the San Diego Padres' Lowell Palmer. Theodore spent one final season in the minors for the Mets before retiring.

== Private life ==
Theodore met his wife, Sabrina, during the 1974 season. They met after he called her to thank her for the portrait of Theodore she drew and sent him. Sabrina teaches art at Uintah Elementary and Oakridge Elementary in Salt Lake City.

After his baseball career, Theodore returned to the University of Utah and earned a Master of Social Work degree in 1978. He went on to work for 38 years as a social worker for Granite School District, mostly at Lincoln Elementary in South Salt Lake. In 2016, South Salt Lake Chamber of Commerce named him Educator of the Year.

On September 28, 2008, Theodore returned to Shea Stadium for the stadium's closing ceremony. Theodore was interviewed during a game by the TV broadcasters on April 16, 2023, when the Mets played the A's in Oakland for a 1973 World Series reunion segment.
