= 1973 World Series =

70th edition of Major League Baseball's championship series

Team (Wins)	Managers	Season
Oakland Athletics (4)	Dick Williams	94–68, .580, GA: 6
New York Mets (3)	Yogi Berra	82–79, .509, GA: 1 1/2
- Dates: October 13–21
- Venue(s): Oakland–Alameda County Coliseum (Oakland); Shea Stadium (New York)
- MVP: Reggie Jackson (Oakland)
- Umpires: Marty Springstead (AL), Augie Donatelli (NL), Jerry Neudecker (AL), Paul Pryor (NL), Russ Goetz (AL), Harry Wendelstedt (NL)
- Hall of Famers: Athletics: Dick Williams (manager); Rollie Fingers; Catfish Hunter; Reggie Jackson; Mets: Yogi Berra (manager); Willie Mays; Tom Seaver

Broadcast
- Television: NBC
- TV announcers: Curt Gowdy; Monte Moore (in Oakland); Lindsey Nelson (in New York); Tony Kubek
- Radio: NBC
- Radio announcers: Jim Simpson; Ralph Kiner (in Oakland); Monte Moore (in New York)
- ALCS: Oakland Athletics over Baltimore Orioles (3–2)
- NLCS: New York Mets over Cincinnati Reds (3–2)

The 1973 World Series was the championship series of Major League Baseball's (MLB) 1973 season. The 70th edition of the World Series, it was a best-of-seven playoff played between the American League (AL) champion (and defending World Series champion) Oakland Athletics and the National League (NL) champion New York Mets. The Athletics won the series in seven games for their second of three consecutive World Series titles and their seventh championship overall. This was the third consecutive World Series to go the full seven games.

The Mets won the NL East division by 1 1/2 games over the St. Louis Cardinals, then defeated the Cincinnati Reds, three games to two, in the NL Championship Series. The Athletics won the AL West division by six games over the Kansas City Royals, then defeated the Baltimore Orioles, three games to two, in the AL Championship Series.

This was the first World Series in which all weekday games started at night. This was the last World Series in which each team produced and sold its own game programs for its home games.

Reggie Jackson was named the World Series MVP. Jackson batted .310 with seven hits and six RBIs and a home run and scored three runs. Jackson was only the third player to be named league MVP and World Series MVP in the same year. Sandy Koufax was the first in 1963 and Frank Robinson was the second in 1966. Koufax was the NL MVP and WS MVP in that year's World Series.

== Background ==
=== New York Mets ===
The 1973 Mets' .509 season winning percentage is the lowest posted by any pennant winner in major league history. Injuries plagued the team throughout the season.

The team got off to a promising 4–0 start, and went .600 for the month of April. Before long, however, the team was soon beset with injuries and fell in standing, just as with their previous season. Stumbling through the summer in last place, the Mets got healthy and hot in September, ultimately winning the division with a mere 82 victories, 1 1/2 games ahead of the St. Louis Cardinals. This marked the only time between 1970 and 1980 that neither their rival Philadelphia Phillies, nor the Pittsburgh Pirates, won the division.

At 82–79, the 1973 New York Mets had the worst record of any team to play in a World Series. They had only the ninth-best record in the 24-team major leagues, behind the Oakland A's, the Cincinnati Reds (who they beat in the National League Championship Series), the Baltimore Orioles (who were defeated by Oakland in the American League Championship Series), the Los Angeles Dodgers, the San Francisco Giants, the Boston Red Sox, the Detroit Tigers and the Kansas City Royals (none of whom made the postseason).

The 1973 New York Mets had the lowest winning percentage (now the third lowest) of any postseason team (the San Diego Padres finished 82–80 in 2005 and the Houston Astros finished 81–81 in 2026). 1969 holdovers Bud Harrelson, Jerry Grote, Wayne Garrett, Tom Seaver, Jerry Koosman, and Tug McGraw and Cleon Jones joined forces with the Mets' farm-system alumni John Milner and Jon Matlack and trade-acquired Rusty Staub, Félix Millán, and Willie Mays, now 42 years old. Don Hahn and Mays alternated in center field, although they both batted right-handed.

The Mets' NLCS opponents, an imposing Cincinnati Reds squad that posted 99 victories during the regular season, were the favorite to return to the Series for a second consecutive year. (The Reds had fallen to the A's in the previous year's Series.) The 1973 NLCS went the full five games, and featured a now-famous brawl between Pete Rose and Mets shortstop Bud Harrelson. In the end, the Mets continued their improbable rise and bumped Rose and the rest of the mighty Reds from the playoffs.

Willie Mays recorded the final hit of his career in Game 2. In four World Series (1951, 1954, 1962, and 1973), Mays did not hit a single home run. He hit only one in the postseason, during the 1971 NLCS. In Game 2, Mays slipped and fell while chasing a ball hit by Deron Johnson, allowing him to reach second base.

=== Oakland Athletics ===
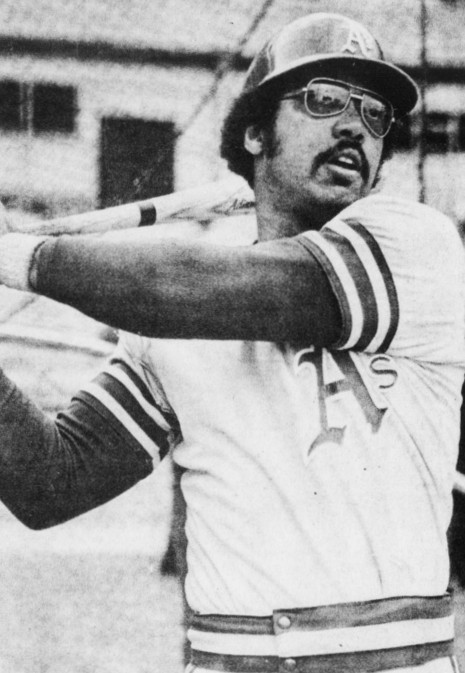
1973 World Series MVP, Reggie Jackson (before game 3).

The Oakland Athletics secured the pennant by overcoming the Baltimore Orioles in the 1973 ALCS. The Athletics, defending champions, still possessed a formidable lineup headed by a healthy Reggie Jackson, (.293, 32 HR, 117 RBI, 22 stolen bases) who would be named league MVP in 1973. Jackson was joined in the lineup by standouts like third baseman Sal Bando, the fine defensive outfielder Joe Rudi, the speedy shortstop Bert Campaneris, and the A's catcher, 1972 World Series hero Gene Tenace. The pitching staff featured three 20-game winners, Ken Holtzman (21–13), Catfish Hunter (21–5), and Vida Blue (20–9), with Rollie Fingers (22 saves, 1.92) serving as the A's ace relief pitcher.

The Athletics offered entertainment both on and off the field in 1973; their brightly colored uniforms were the perfect metaphor for a team notable for clashing personalities. The stars engaged regularly in conflicts with each other and with owner Charles O. Finley.

With the designated hitter rule in effect for the first time in 1973, American League pitchers seldom batted during the regular season. They were, however, expected to take their turn at the plate during each game of this Series. So it was that a man who had played no offensive role during the regular season came to make a key batting contribution for the Athletics during the Series. With some extra batting practice, A's pitcher Ken Holtzman would stroke a double that helped the Athletics to win Game 1 – and another double that helped them secure the deciding seventh game.

This Series was also notable for an incident where Finley attempted to "fire" second-baseman Mike Andrews for his errors in Game 2 (see below). Commissioner Bowie Kuhn would reinstate Andrews and fine Finley. Despite the hostility of the Oakland players toward the team's owner, the Athletics would be the first to repeat as World Champions since the 1961–62 New York Yankees. Oakland manager Dick Williams resigned after the Series was over, having had enough of owner Charles O. Finley's interference.

Oakland reliever Darold Knowles became the first pitcher to appear in every game of a seven-game World Series.

== Summary ==
AL Oakland A's (4) vs. NL New York Mets (3)

Game	Date	Score	Location	Time	Attendance
1	October 13	New York Mets – 1, Oakland A's – 2	Oakland–Alameda County Coliseum	2:26	46,021
2	October 14	New York Mets – 10, Oakland A's – 7 (12)	Oakland–Alameda County Coliseum	4:13	49,151
3	October 16	Oakland A's – 3, New York Mets – 2 (11)	Shea Stadium	3:15	54,817
4	October 17	Oakland A's – 1, New York Mets – 6	Shea Stadium	2:41	54,817
5	October 18	Oakland A's – 0, New York Mets – 2	Shea Stadium	2:39	54,817
6	October 20	New York Mets – 1, Oakland A's – 3	Oakland–Alameda County Coliseum	2:07	49,333
7	October 21	New York Mets – 2, Oakland A's – 5	Oakland–Alameda County Coliseum	2:37	49,333

== Matchups ==
=== Game 1 ===
Bert Campaneris delivered the first run of the game on a rolling groundball and then scored the second run in an eventual 2–1 victory.

October 13, 1973 1:00 pm (PT) at Oakland–Alameda County Coliseum in Oakland, California 65 °F (18 °C), sunny
Team	1	2	3	4	5	6	7	8	9	R	H	E
New York	0	0	0	1	0	0	0	0	0	1	7	2
Oakland	0	0	2	0	0	0	0	0	X	2	4	0
WP: Ken Holtzman (1–0) LP: Jon Matlack (0–1) Sv: Darold Knowles (1)

The Mets and A's opened the Series in Oakland with Jon Matlack and Ken Holtzman as the Game 1 starters (Matlack, with a 14–16 record during the 1973 season, is one of only four pitchers in history to start Game 1 of a World Series after a regular season losing record). Willie Mays started in place of the injured Rusty Staub and batted third in what turned out to be his final big league start.

In the third, pitcher Holtzman doubled and scored when Bert Campaneris hit a routine grounder that inexplicably bounced between Mets second baseman's Félix Millán's legs. Campaneris then stole second and scored on a single to right by Joe Rudi. The Mets came up with a run in the fourth on an RBI single by John Milner that scored Cleon Jones. Holtzman, Rollie Fingers, and Darold Knowles then shut the door on the Mets offense; Knowles earned the save.

=== Game 2 ===
Tug McGraw pitched six innings in relief, blew the save, but picked up the win as the Mets rallied for four runs in the 12th.

October 14, 1973 1:30 pm (PT) at Oakland–Alameda County Coliseum in Oakland, California 69 °F (21 °C), mostly cloudy
Team	1	2	3	4	5	6	7	8	9	10	11	12	R	H	E
New York	0	1	1	0	0	4	0	0	0	0	0	4	10	15	1
Oakland	2	1	0	0	0	0	1	0	2	0	0	1	7	13	5
WP: Tug McGraw (1–0) LP: Rollie Fingers (0–1) Sv: George Stone (1); Home runs: NYM: Cleon Jones (1), Wayne Garrett (1); OAK: None

Game 2, eventually won by the Mets 10–7 in 12 innings, set a new record for the longest game in Series history at four hours and 13 minutes. Along with blinding sunshine "turn{ing} every fly ball into adventure" (especially for a 42-year-old Willie Mays), Curt Gowdy described the contest in the official MLB 1973 Fall Classic highlight film as one of the "longest and weirdest games in World Series history".

Vida Blue opposed Jerry Koosman on the mound, but neither pitched well. In the first inning, the A's jumped on Koosman for two runs as the flyball adventures began. With one out, Joe Rudi reached second on a fly ball to left that Cleon Jones lost in the sun as he drifted to the warning track and the ball dropped in front of him. Rudi scored when the next batter, Sal Bando, hit a ball to right center that Don Hahn misplayed and allowed to bounce to the wall as Bando reached third. After Gene Tenace walked with two outs, Bando scored on a Jesús Alou double. The A's scored again in the second on Joe Rudi's single scoring the ubiquitous Bert Campaneris, who had tripled. The Mets got home runs from Cleon Jones and Wayne Garrett in the second and third innings, respectively.

The A's were still up 3–2 going into the sixth when things got even more strange. With one out and two on, Horacio Piña relieved Blue and promptly hit Jerry Grote with his first pitch, loading the bases. Don Hahn then drove home Cleon Jones with an infield hit and Bud Harrelson followed with an RBI single to put the Mets ahead 4–3. Jim Beauchamp then pinch-hit for reliever Harry Parker and hit a comebacker to the mound. Darold Knowles, who had relieved Pina, fielded the ball but lost his balance hurrying the throw home and threw wildly past Ray Fosse on the attempted force play. Two more Mets runs scored for a 6–3 lead.

Reggie Jackson had an RBI double in the seventh to make it 6–4. In the ninth, Deron Johnson, batting for Blue Moon Odom, lifted a fly ball to center that Willie Mays lost in the sun and fell down while chasing. Johnson reached second. Allan Lewis pinch-ran and scored on a single by Jackson after Sal Bando walked. Gene Tenace singled in Bando to tie it.

The Mets threatened in the 10th when Harrelson led off with a single. Tug McGraw bunted for a sacrifice and Rollie Fingers threw to second, but Harrelson ran with the pitch and was safe. McGraw was retired on the relay to first. Harrelson went to third when Garrett bounced a high grounder to Tenace at first and reached when Tenace's throw pulled Fingers off the bag. Harrelson then tagged and attempted to score on a Félix Millán fly to left. Harrelson appeared to have sidestepped Fosse's tag at the plate (and replays from NBC's broadcast clearly showed Fosse missed him), but he was called out by umpire Augie Donatelli, prompting a heated outburst from Harrelson, on-deck batter Willie Mays, and manager Yogi Berra.

The game stayed knotted at 6–6 until the top of the 12th. Harrelson led off with a double and went to third when McGraw reached first on a bunt that Sal Bando overran. With two outs, Mays drove in Harrelson with a single that would turn out to be the final hit and RBI of his storied career. It gave the Mets a 7–6 lead.

After Jones walked to load the bases, John Milner grounded to second baseman Mike Andrews, but the ball went through his legs. McGraw and Mays scored to make the lead 9–6. The next batter, Grote, hit another grounder to Andrews, but his throw to first pulled Tenace off the bag (though NBC replays showed Tenace kept his foot on the bag). Jones scored to make it 10–6.

The A's added a run in the bottom of the inning when Jackson reached third as Mays lost yet another fly ball in the sun and Alou singled him home, but Andrews' errors proved too much to overcome. McGraw, who pitched six innings total, earned the win, and George Stone the save and the Mets evened the series.

A's owner Charlie Finley was furious at Andrews' 12th-inning miscues; he proceeded to punish Andrews (and further alienate A's manager Dick Williams) by forcing Andrews to sign a false affidavit saying he was injured, thereby sidelining him for the remainder of the Series.

=== Game 3 ===
October 16, 1973 8:30 pm (ET) at Shea Stadium in Queens, New York 55 °F (13 °C), mostly cloudy
Team	1	2	3	4	5	6	7	8	9	10	11	R	H	E
Oakland	0	0	0	0	0	1	0	1	0	0	1	3	10	1
New York	2	0	0	0	0	0	0	0	0	0	0	2	10	2
WP: Paul Lindblad (1–0) LP: Harry Parker (0–1) Sv: Rollie Fingers (1); Home runs: OAK: None; NYM: Wayne Garrett (2)

Game 3 matched up Tom Seaver and Catfish Hunter. Hunter had trouble early on when Wayne Garrett homered to right and Félix Millán scored on a wild pitch, but then found his rhythm. Seaver kept the A's off the board until the sixth, when Sal Bando and Gene Tenace broke through with consecutive doubles that delivered a run and cut the Met lead to 2–1. Joe Rudi came up with another clutch hit in the eighth when he singled in Bert Campaneris to tie the game. In the bottom of the tenth, Willie Mays would make his final appearance in an MLB game, unsuccessfully pinch-hitting for Tug McGraw. Campaneris delivered the game-winning RBI in the 11th when he singled off Harry Parker to score Ted Kubiak. Rollie Fingers got the save.

In this game, manager Dick Williams and the A's players wore a piece of athletic tape with the number 17, which was Mike Andrews' uniform number, affixed to their uniforms in protest of Charlie Finley's actions in the previous game concerning Andrews.

=== Game 4 ===
October 17, 1973 8:30 pm (ET) at Shea Stadium in Queens, New York 51 °F (11 °C), mostly cloudy
Team	1	2	3	4	5	6	7	8	9	R	H	E
Oakland	0	0	0	1	0	0	0	0	0	1	5	1
New York	3	0	0	3	0	0	0	0	X	6	13	1
WP: Jon Matlack (1–1) LP: Ken Holtzman (1–1) Sv: Ray Sadecki (1); Home runs: OAK: None; NYM: Rusty Staub (1)

Prior to this game, MLB commissioner Bowie Kuhn ordered Charlie Finley to re-instate Mike Andrews to the active playoff roster, citing his illegal actions after Game 2.

A's starter Ken Holtzman couldn't make it out of the first inning after Rusty Staub smashed a three-run homer to left-center. Blue Moon Odom relieved and gave up a two-run single to Staub in a three-run Mets fourth. Jon Matlack got the win by pitching eight innings of three-hit ball. Ray Sadecki pitched the ninth and got the save.

Andrews entered the game as a pinch-hitter in the eighth, prompting a standing ovation from the Mets' home crowd, in a display of defiance toward Finley. Andrews grounded out in what would be his last major league at-bat.

=== Game 5 ===
October 18, 1973 8:30 pm (ET) at Shea Stadium in Queens, New York 51 °F (11 °C), mostly cloudy
Team	1	2	3	4	5	6	7	8	9	R	H	E
Oakland	0	0	0	0	0	0	0	0	0	0	3	1
New York	0	1	0	0	0	1	0	0	X	2	7	1
WP: Jerry Koosman (1–0) LP: Vida Blue (0–1) Sv: Tug McGraw (1)

Game 5 was a rematch up of Vida Blue and Jerry Koosman. This time, both pitchers threw well. John Milner had an RBI single in the second, and Don Hahn's triple to center field scored Jerry Grote with the second Mets run in the sixth. Koosman pitched well and got the win, with a save from Tug McGraw.

=== Game 6 ===
October 20, 1973 1:00 pm (PT) at Oakland–Alameda County Coliseum in Oakland, California 67 °F (19 °C), partly cloudy
Team	1	2	3	4	5	6	7	8	9	R	H	E
New York	0	0	0	0	0	0	0	1	0	1	6	2
Oakland	1	0	1	0	0	0	0	1	X	3	7	0
WP: Catfish Hunter (1–0) LP: Tom Seaver (0–1) Sv: Rollie Fingers (2)

The A's won, thanks to the clutch pitching of Catfish Hunter (who outdueled Tom Seaver), who was pitching on short rest, and the timely hitting of Reggie Jackson. Jackson doubled and drove in Joe Rudi in the first inning and doubled in Sal Bando in the third to give Oakland a 2–0 lead. In the eighth inning, the Mets threatened, knocking Hunter out of the game after Ken Boswell singled in a run. Reliever Darold Knowles put out the fire by striking out Rusty Staub on three pitches with two men on base. In the bottom half of the inning, the A's added an insurance run when Jackson singled, advanced to third on center fielder Don Hahn's error, and scored on Jesús Alou's sacrifice fly. Rollie Fingers got the save in the ninth inning to force a seventh game.

=== Game 7 ===
October 21, 1973 1:30 pm (PT) at Oakland–Alameda County Coliseum in Oakland, California 66 °F (19 °C), partly cloudy
Team	1	2	3	4	5	6	7	8	9	R	H	E
New York	0	0	0	0	0	1	0	0	1	2	8	1
Oakland	0	0	4	0	1	0	0	0	X	5	9	1
WP: Ken Holtzman (2–1) LP: Jon Matlack (1–2) Sv: Darold Knowles (2); Home runs: NYM: None; OAK: Bert Campaneris (1), Reggie Jackson (1)

Ken Holtzman outdueled Jon Matlack in a rematch of the Game 4 starters. The third inning proved to be the difference, as Holtzman lined a one-out double off Matlack to left, his second of the Series after not batting at all during the season. Matlack then surrendered a two-run opposite-field homer to Bert Campaneris (Oakland's first home run of the series), and then another two-run blast to Reggie Jackson later in the inning, giving the A's a 4–0 lead and Holtzman all the runs he needed. The Mets came back with two runs after Oakland increased their lead to 5–0 in the fifth inning, but it was not enough. Campaneris snagged a Wayne Garrett pop fly to end the series; and Jackson was named the World Series MVP.

In the third inning, Gene Tenace walked for the 11th time tying the Series record set by Babe Ruth of the Yankees in 1926. In the seventh inning, Wayne Garrett struck out for the 11th time tying the Series record set by Eddie Mathews of the Milwaukee Braves in 1958 (later broken in 1980 when Willie Wilson of the Royals struck out 12 times). Darold Knowles got the save and became the only pitcher to appear in all seven games of a seven-game World Series until Brandon Morrow in the 2017 World Series.

The final out was recorded at 4:07 p.m. Pacific Time, making this the last World Series (through 2025) to end in daylight.

Vern Hoscheit, a coach with the A's in 1973, would win a World Series with the Mets as a coach in 1986.

== Composite line score ==
1973 World Series (4–3): Oakland A's (A.L.) over New York Mets (N.L.)

Team	1	2	3	4	5	6	7	8	9	10	11	12	R	H	E
Oakland A's	3	1	7	1	1	1	1	2	2	0	1	1	21	51	9
New York Mets	5	2	1	4	0	6	0	1	1	0	0	4	24	66	10
Total attendance: 358,289 Average attendance: 51,184; Winning player's share: $24,618 Losing player's share: $14,950

This was the third consecutive year in which the World Series went a full seven games and the champions were outscored; this occurred again two years later in 1975.

== See also ==
- 1973 Japan Series
