= George Stone (pitcher) =

American baseball player (born 1946)

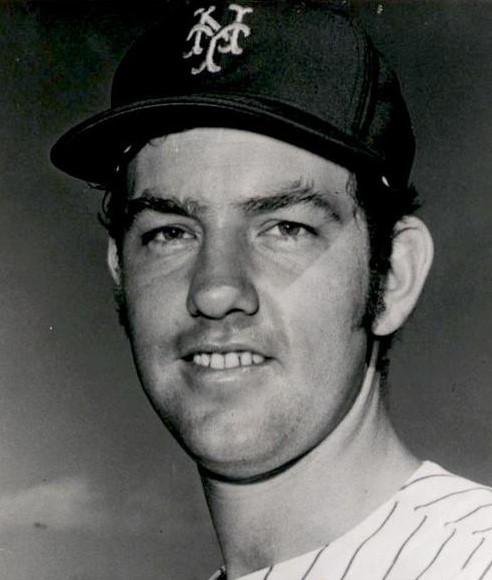
- Pitcher
- Born: July 9, 1946 (age 80); Ruston, Louisiana, U.S.
- Batted: Left Threw: Left

MLB debut
- September 15, 1967, for the Atlanta Braves

Last MLB appearance
- September 27, 1975, for the New York Mets

MLB statistics
- Win–loss record: 60–57
- Earned run average: 3.89
- Strikeouts: 590
- Stats at Baseball Reference

Teams
- Atlanta Braves (1967–1972); New York Mets (1973–1975)

George Heard Stone (born July 9, 1946) is an American former Major League Baseball pitcher. He is likely best remembered for his 1973 season with the New York Mets, when he went 12–3 with a 2.80 ERA -- leading the National League in winning percentage -- to help the Mets to the 1973 World Series.

== Atlanta Braves ==
Stone played college baseball and basketball for Louisiana Tech, and was drafted by the Atlanta Braves in the 1966 Major League Baseball draft. After two seasons in the Braves' farm system, in which he went 16–9 with a 2.51 earned run average, he reached the majors as a September call-up in 1967. He made his major league debut on September 15 at Atlanta–Fulton County Stadium, and lasted just a third of an inning and giving up three earned runs against the Chicago Cubs.

After starting the 1968 season in the minors, Stone reached the majors again that July. Though he had been used primarily as a starting pitcher in the minors, he was used primarily out of the bullpen when he first joined the Braves. By August, however, he had earned a spot in the starting rotation, and went 7–3 as a starter his rookie season.

Stone was 13–10 with a 3.65 ERA for the National League West champions in 1969. He made just one appearance in the 1969 National League Championship Series, pitching one inning in the third, and final, game against the Mets.

== New York Mets ==
Stone was acquired with Félix Millán by the New York Mets from the Braves for Gary Gentry and Danny Frisella on November 1, 1972, one of the best trades in Mets history. As with the Braves, Stone began his career with the Mets as a relief pitcher, going 1–0 with a save and a 0.60 ERA before being added to the starting rotation. Though he lost his first two starts, Stone proved an invaluable addition to the Mets' starting rotation, winning his last eight decisions, as the Mets came from 12.5 games back to win the National League East.

Stone started game four of the 1973 NLCS, going 6.2 innings and giving up one run before giving way to the bullpen. The Cincinnati Reds won the game in twelve innings; however, the Mets won game five to head to the World Series. Stone was used out of the bullpen in the 1973 World Series, appearing in games two and seven, and he was on the mound for.a successful save in the former (a 10-7 victory).

In 1974 and 1975, Stone was unable to match his early success with the Mets, going 5–10 with a 5.04 ERA, and ended up tearing his rotator cuff. Following the 1975 season, he was traded to the Texas Rangers for Bill Hands. Stone (and Hands) retired from baseball instead.

In his career, Stone won 60 games against 57 losses, a .513 winning percentage, with 590 strikeouts and a 3.89 ERA in 1020.2 innings pitched. As a batter, he had 72 hits in 339 at-bats for a .212 batting average with one home run, 33 runs and 39 RBI.
