= Lute Barnes =

American baseball player (born 1947)

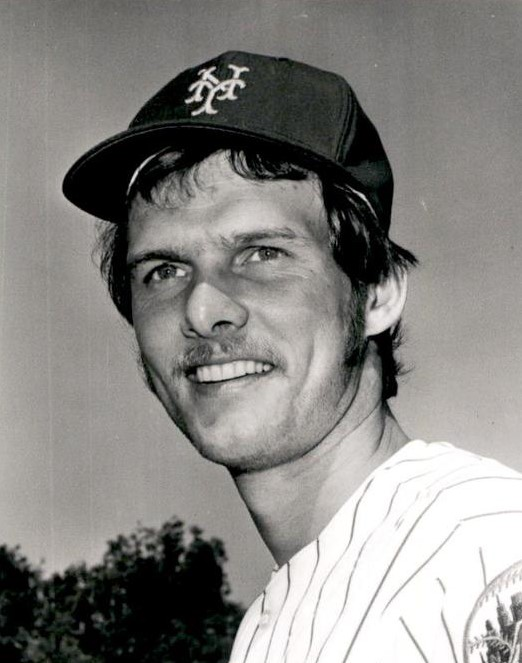
- Second baseman/Shortstop
- Born: April 28, 1947 (age 79); Forest City, Iowa, U.S.
- Batted: Right Threw: Right

MLB debut
- August 6, 1972, for the New York Mets

Last MLB appearance
- September 26, 1973, for the New York Mets

MLB statistics
- Batting average: .243
- Hits: 18
- Stats at Baseball Reference

Teams
- New York Mets (1972–1973)

Luther Owen Barnes (born April 28, 1947) is an American former professional baseball second baseman and shortstop who played Major League Baseball for the New York Mets from 1972-1973. Barnes attended North Salem High School then college at Oregon State University. He was drafted by the Mets in the 21st round (482nd overall) of the 1969 amateur draft.

He is the great-uncle of Hollywood actor and filmmaker Cal Barnes.
