= Bob Rauch =

American baseball player (born 1949)

- Pitcher
- Born: June 16, 1949 (age 77); Brookings, South Dakota, U.S.
- Batted: Right Threw: Right

MLB debut
- June 29, 1972, for the New York Mets

Last MLB appearance
- October 2, 1972, for the New York Mets

MLB statistics
- Earned run average: 5.00
- Record: 0-1
- Strikeouts: 23
- Stats at Baseball Reference

Teams
- New York Mets (1972)

Robert John Rauch (/raʊk/ ROWK; born June 16, 1949) is an American former right-handed Major League Baseball pitcher who played for the New York Mets in 1972.

Originally signed by the Los Angeles Dodgers in 1967, after attending Eisenhower High School and San Bernardino Valley College he began his professional career with the Ogden Dodgers that very year. His performance was lackluster, as he went 1-1 with a 9.45 ERA in 20 innings, allowing 25 hits and 26 walks. On a positive note, he did strike out 24 batters.

The following year, again with the Ogden Dodgers, Rauch went 1-2 with a 4.66 ERA in 29 innings. In 1969, playing for the Rogue Valley Dodgers and Bakersfield Dodgers, Rauch went a combined 6-4 with a 4.55 ERA. With Rogue Valley, he struck out 72 batters in 62 innings, although with Bakersfield, he struck out only 19 batters in 31 innings.

Pitching for Bakersfield again in 1970, he went 4-4 with a 2.82 ERA and 91 strikeouts in 83 innings of work. On November 30, 1970, he was drafted by the Mets in the minor-league draft. In his first year in their minor league system - 1971 - he had perhaps the best season of his career when he went a combined 9-5 with a 2.10 ERA while splitting time between the Memphis Blues and Tidewater Tides. His numbers would have been better if he had not pitched for the Tides that year - while with the Blues, he went 9-4 with a 1.48 ERA. With the Tides, his record was 1-0 and his ERA was 4.76.

In 1972, Rauch had another impressive year, pitching for the Tides and earning a call up to the Mets. In 21 games with the Tides, he went 1-2 with a 2.72 ERA. He made his big league debut on June 29 of that year, at the age of 22. Facing the Philadelphia Phillies, he pitched one inning, allowing 2 hits, 2 walks and a run. The Mets overall did poorly that game, losing 9-4. The opposing pitcher - Steve Carlton - pitched a complete game, striking out 13 batters. In his one and only big league season, Rauch went 0-1 with a 5.00 ERA in 19 relief appearances. He played in his final big league game on October 2.

Rauch was traded with Brent Strom from the Mets to the Cleveland Indians for Phil Hennigan at the Winter Meetings on November 27, 1972. He never actually appeared in an Indians uniform.
