= Tug McGraw =

American baseball player (1944–2004)

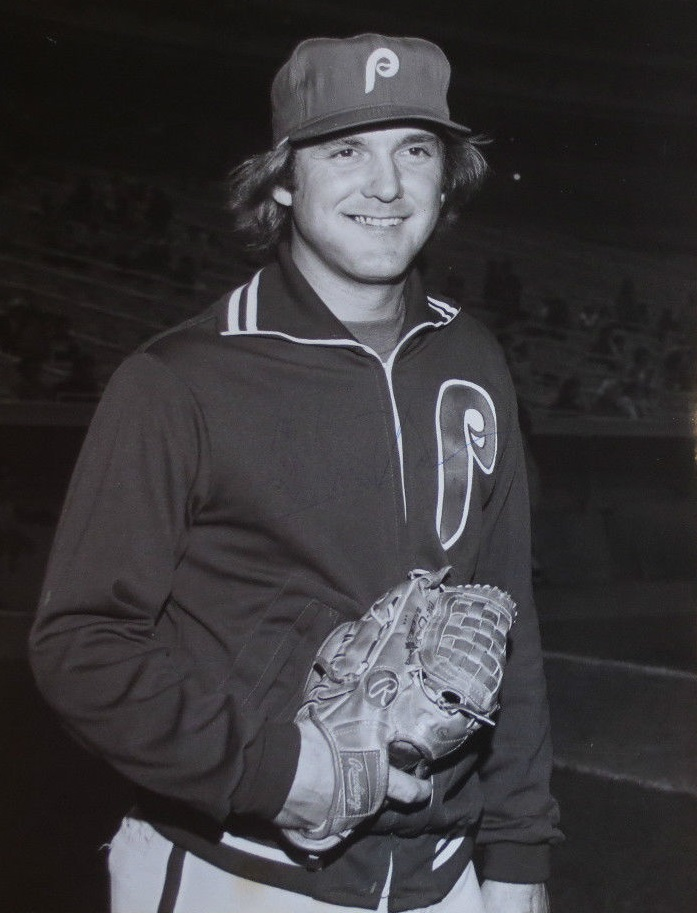
- Pitcher
- Born: August 30, 1944; Martinez, California, U.S.
- Died: January 5, 2004 (aged 59); Brentwood, Tennessee, U.S.
- Batted: Right Threw: Left

MLB debut
- April 18, 1965, for the New York Mets

Last MLB appearance
- September 25, 1984, for the Philadelphia Phillies

MLB statistics
- Games pitched: 824
- Win–loss record: 96–92
- Earned run average: 3.14
- Strikeouts: 1,109
- Saves: 180
- Stats at Baseball Reference

Teams
- New York Mets (1965–1967, 1969–1974); Philadelphia Phillies (1975–1984)

Career highlights and awards
- 2× All-Star (1972, 1975); 2× World Series champion (1969, 1980); New York Mets Hall of Fame; Philadelphia Phillies Wall of Fame
Military career
Allegiance	United States
Branch	U.S. Marine Corps Reserve
Service years	1965–1971
Rank	Corporal
Unit	Infantry

Frank Edwin "Tug" McGraw Jr. (August 30, 1944 – January 5, 2004) was an American professional baseball relief pitcher. McGraw played in 19 seasons in Major League Baseball (MLB), from 1965 to 1984, for the New York Mets and Philadelphia Phillies. He is often remembered for coining the phrase "Ya Gotta Believe", which became the rallying cry for the 1973 New York Mets and has since become a popular slogan for the team and fans.

McGraw struck out Willie Wilson to end the 1980 World Series against the Kansas City Royals, bringing the Philadelphia Phillies their first World Series championship in franchise history.

McGraw was one of six Phillies players to die prematurely from glioblastoma, a brain cancer.

== Early life ==
Frank Edwin "Tug" McGraw Jr. was born August 30, 1944, in Martinez, California, the second of three sons of Frank Edwin "Big Mac" McGraw Sr. and Mable McKenna. McGraw got the nickname "Tugger" from his mother because of the particularly aggressive way he breast-fed. The name stuck and McGraw preferred it, even asking to be called "Tug" by his kindergarten teacher. His mother was bipolar and was physically and verbally abusive. She abandoned the family after spending time in Napa State Mental Hospital and the family was raised by Frank McGraw Sr. His father was athletic and was a butcher, trucker, and fireman and then a water treatment plant operator and engineer who encouraged the children to play sports. He was the great-grandson of Irish immigrants. After his divorce in the early 1950s, Frank Sr. moved his three sons to nearby Vallejo. Tug graduated from St. Vincent Ferrer High School, a Catholic school in Vallejo, in 1962. McGraw enrolled in Vallejo Junior College (now Solano Community College).

== Career ==
=== Minor leagues ===
In 1961, Tug's brother Hank had signed with the New York Mets by scout Roy Partee; Hank later asked Partee to look into signing Tug, threatening to quit if Tug was not signed. On June 12, 1964, McGraw signed with the New York Mets as an amateur free agent, receiving a $7,000 signing bonus. McGraw was used both as a starting pitcher and as a relief pitcher in Minor League Baseball at Cocoa Beach, Florida, where he pitched a no-hitter in his debut in Auburn, New York. He went 6–4 that year with a 1.64 earned run average.

=== New York Mets (1965–1967, 1969–1974) ===
1972 photo of McGraw for the New York Mets

McGraw qualified for the Mets in Spring training in 1965 at age 20, without ever having played double- or triple-A ball. There, he played under manager Casey Stengel, who retired that year. He made his major league debut on April 18, 1965, as a reliever, against the San Francisco Giants. After striking out Orlando Cepeda in his debut, he was given a tranquilizer to calm down.

McGraw made the team as a reliever, and was 0–1 with a 3.12 ERA and one save when he made his first major league start on July 28 against the Chicago Cubs in the second game of a double header at Wrigley Field. He lasted just two-thirds of an inning and gave up three earned runs on his way to a 9–0 loss (the Cubs blew the Mets out in the first game as well, 7–2). On August 22, in his second start, also in the second game of a double header, only this time against the St. Louis Cardinals at Shea Stadium, McGraw pitched a complete game to earn his first major league win. On August 26, he won his next start, 5–2 over Sandy Koufax and the Los Angeles Dodgers. It marked the first time the Mets had ever beaten Koufax. McGraw remained in the Mets' starting rotation for the remainder of the season but failed to log another win, going 2–6 as a starter and 0–1 in relief.

The Mets used McGraw as a starter again in 1966, and he was 2–9 with a 5.52 ERA in that role. Though he also made four starts with the Mets in 1967, McGraw spent most of the season and all of 1968 in the minor leagues with the Jacksonville Suns. In 1968, he went 9–9 with a 3.42 ERA for the Suns. By the time he returned to the Mets in 1969, manager Gil Hodges had a very capable young pitching rotation that included Tom Seaver, Jerry Koosman, and Gary Gentry and had no need for McGraw as a starter until Koosman went down with an injury in May. McGraw went 1–1 with a 5.23 ERA filling in for Koosman.

Koosman returned to the rotation at the end of the month and on May 28, after a five-game losing streak that saw the Mets fall into fourth place in the newly aligned National League East, Koosman and the expansion San Diego Padres' Clay Kirby engaged in a pitchers' duel at Shea. After nine scoreless innings by Kirby and ten by Koosman, the game was turned over to the bullpens for extra innings. The game finally ended after 11 innings when Bud Harrelson hit a single to drive in Cleon Jones. McGraw pitched the 11th inning to earn the win.

In June 1969, manager Gil Hodges suggested that Tug become a relief pitcher, a career-changing decision with which Tug agreed. This began an 11-game winning streak that brought the Mets into second place, seven games behind the Chicago Cubs. McGraw earned two saves during that stretch and 12 for the season. His record as a reliever was 8–2 with a 1.47 ERA.

The Cubs had been in first place in the NL East for 156 days of the season, and they seemed likely to win the division when they came to New York City to open a crucial two-game series with the Mets on September 8. The Mets won both games to close within a half game of the Cubs. The following day, the Mets swept a double header from the expansion Montreal Expos. Coupled with a loss by the Cubs, who slumped to a 9–17 record in their final 26 games, the Mets moved into first place for the first time ever during the 1969 season.

On September 15, the St. Louis Cardinals' Steve Carlton struck out a record 19 Mets in a losing effort, as the Mets defeated the Cards 4–3 at Busch Memorial Stadium on a pair of two-run home runs by Ron Swoboda. McGraw pitched the final three innings without giving up a run to earn the win in this game. On September 24, facing Carlton and the Cardinals, again — only this time at Shea Stadium, the New York Mets clinched the NL East as Donn Clendenon hit two home runs in a 6–0 Mets victory. The Mets won 39 of their last 50 games, and finished the season with 100 wins against 62 losses, eight games over the second place Cubs.

McGraw's first postseason appearance came in game two of the new 1969 National League Championship Series (NLCS). After the Atlanta Braves scored six runs off Koosman in 4 2/3 innings, Ron Taylor and McGraw held the Braves scoreless the remainder of the way to secure the Mets' 11–6 victory. He did not appear in any other games during the 1969 postseason, in which the Mets won the World Series. McGraw said that "Everything changed for me in 1969". That year he went to Vietnam on a goodwill tour; he was slapped by Ron Taylor for smoking marijuana. He received a $10,000 bonus for being on the World Series team; he used $7,000 to buy a white Mercedes-Benz convertible, which was given to his son after he died.

==== "Ya Gotta Believe!" ====
McGraw emerged as one of the top closers in the National League in the early 1970s, enjoying a career year in 1972. He was 3–3 with a 2.01 ERA and 15 saves at the All-Star break to earn his first All-Star selection. McGraw pitched two innings, striking out four and giving up only one hit to earn the win in the NL's 4–3 come from behind victory. For the season, McGraw went 8–6 with a 1.70 ERA, giving up just 71 hits in 106 innings pitched, and setting a Mets record with 27 saves that lasted until 1984.

Whereas 1973 wasn't as good a year statistically for McGraw, he was valued for the leadership role he assumed for the league champions. The Mets had fallen into last place in the NL East, and had remained there through August 30. McGraw was the winning pitcher for the Mets on August 31 when the Mets emerged from last place with an extra innings victory over the St. Louis Cardinals. The win improved McGraw's record to 2–6 with a 5.05 ERA.

For the remainder of the season, McGraw went 3–0 with a 0.57 ERA and ten saves. The Mets, meanwhile, went 20–8 from that point forward to pull off the stunning division title. At a July 9 team meeting where Mets Board Chairman M. Donald Grant was trying to encourage the team, McGraw shouted the words, "Ya Gotta Believe" which became a popular rallying cry for the Mets. He said the famous phrase when maybe only he believed the Mets could actually get to the World Series. But soon enough, hearing McGraw say it again and again, seeing him do his magic in the ninth, the Mets themselves came to believe. They pulled into first place on September 21 with a 10–2 victory over the Pittsburgh Pirates, and clinched the division crown on the final day of the season with a win over the Cubs. This was the only season between 1970 and 1980 that the National League East wasn't won by either Philadelphia or Pittsburgh.

McGraw continued his dominant pitching into the postseason, when he pitched five innings over two games in the NLCS against the defending NL champion Cincinnati Reds without giving up a run, and appeared in five of the seven games of the World Series against the defending champion Oakland Athletics. Though he blew the save in game two, he pitched three shutout innings in extra innings to earn the win.

McGraw was traded along with Don Hahn and Dave Schneck from the Mets to the Philadelphia Phillies for Del Unser, John Stearns, and Mac Scarce at the Winter Meetings on December 3, 1974. McGraw had developed shoulder trouble during a season in which he went 6–11 with a 4.15 ERA, and at the time of the trade, it appeared as if the Mets may have been unloading damaged goods. After the trade, he was diagnosed with a simple cyst and after successful surgery to remove it, recovered completely. McGraw left the Mets as the all-time leader in saves, games pitched, and games finished.

=== Philadelphia Phillies (1975–1984) ===
With the Phillies, he continued his role as a reliable relief pitcher, earning his second career All-Star nod in his first season in Philadelphia, though he did not appear in the game. After finishing second to the Pirates in 1975, McGraw's Phillies won their division crown the next three seasons. They were, however, unable to reach the World Series as they were swept by Cincinnati's "Big Red Machine" in the 1976 NLCS, and fell to the Los Angeles Dodgers the following two seasons.

McGraw was nearly traded along with Bake McBride and Larry Christenson to the Texas Rangers for Sparky Lyle and Johnny Grubb at the 1979 Winter Meetings in Toronto, but the proposed transaction was never executed because a deferred money issue in Lyle's contract went unresolved.

The Phillies were battling back-and-forth for first place with the Montreal Expos in 1980 when the Expos came to Veterans Stadium for a crucial three game set on September 25. The Phillies won two of the three, with McGraw winning the second game, to pull a half game up on Montreal. By the time the Phillies went to Montreal for the final series of the season, the two teams were tied for first place.

The Phillies won the opener, 2–1. McGraw earned the save by striking out five of the six batters he faced. The following day, McGraw entered the game in the ninth inning, with the score tied at four. McGraw pitched three innings, striking out three and only giving up one hit, a tenth-inning lead-off single by Jerry White. It was also one of just two balls to leave the infield once McGraw entered the game. After Mike Schmidt's 11th-inning home run put the Phillies up 6–4, McGraw pitched a 1–2–3 11th inning, striking out Larry Parrish to end the game, and clinch the National League East for the Phillies for the fourth time since joining the club.

For the season, McGraw went 5–4 with a 1.46 ERA, 75 strikeouts and 20 saves. Phillies starter Steve Carlton won the National League Cy Young Award, and slugging third baseman Mike Schmidt was the unanimous NL MVP. McGraw received consideration in balloting for both awards as well, finishing fifth in Cy Young balloting, and 16th for league MVP.

==== 1980 World Champions ====
McGraw pitched in all five games of the 1980 NLCS against the Houston Astros. The Phillies won the first game 3–1, with McGraw earning the save. The Astros, however, came back in game two with an extra innings victory to send the series to Houston tied at a game apiece.

McGraw entered game three in the eighth inning with a runner on second, and one out. He managed to get out of the inning, and keep the Astros scoreless until the 11th inning, when Joe Morgan led the inning off with a triple. Rafael Landestoy entered the game as a pinch runner for Morgan, and McGraw intentionally walked the next two batters to create a force at any base. The strategy didn't work, as the following batter, Denny Walling, hit a sacrifice fly to Greg Luzinski in left field scoring Landestoy.

The final two games of the series also went into extra innings. He earned a save in game four to even the series, however, blew the save in the fifth and deciding game, allowing it to go into extra innings. Dick Ruthven entered the game in the ninth and pitched two perfect innings. Meanwhile, the Phillies came back with a run in the tenth to proceed to the World Series against the Kansas City Royals.

McGraw appeared in four of the six games of the World Series, striking out ten batters in 7.2 innings. The Phillies swept the first two games in Philadelphia, with McGraw earning the save in game one. The Royals, however, came back to even the series after two games in Kansas City, with McGraw picking up the loss in game three.

McGraw entered game five in the seventh inning with the Phillies behind 3–2. He pitched three scoreless innings, while his team scored two ninth inning runs off Royals closer Dan Quisenberry to head back to Philadelphia with a 3–2 series lead. McGraw entered game six of the World Series in the eighth inning with no outs, and runners on first and second, and the Phillies up, 4–0. He allowed one inherited base runner to score, but managed to get through the inning relatively unscathed. After giving up a walk and two singles to load the bases in the ninth inning, he struck out Willie Wilson, clinching the Phillies' first World Series championship.

The next day, at a victory rally at John F. Kennedy Stadium, McGraw summed it all up for the fans after 97 years of futility for the Phillies franchise:

All through baseball history, Philadelphia has had to take a back seat to New York City. Well, New York City can take this world championship and stick it! 'CAUSE WE'RE NUMBER ONE!

In later years, McGraw expressed remorse toward his comments toward New York. He returned to Shea Stadium on numerous occasions following his retirement, citing his love for the Mets fans.

==== Final four seasons ====
McGraw went 2–4 with a 2.66 ERA and ten saves in the strike-shortened 1981 season. The Phillies won the first half season crown, however, they lost the 1981 National League Division Series to the Montreal Expos. On March 17, 1981, McGraw wore a dyed green uniform on St. Patrick's Day to a spring training game, though an umpire refused to let him play. McGraw called St. Patrick's Day his favorite holiday. Since 1989, the Phillies have had a tradition of playing in green on St. Patrick's Day.

In 1982, McGraw shifted into more of a set-up man role, with both Ron Reed and Ed Farmer earning more saves than he on the season. Prior to the start of the 1983 season, the Phillies acquired Al Holland from the San Francisco Giants to assume the closer role. Following the 1984 season, McGraw retired at age 40. As a favor to longtime friend Roman Gabriel, he returned to professional baseball for single starts during the 1989 and 1990 minor league seasons with the Class A Gastonia Rangers of the South Atlantic League.

== Other work ==
In the 1980s and 1990s, he was a sports anchor and reporter for Action News on WPVI, the ABC affiliate in Philadelphia. He appeared as himself in a 1999 episode of Everybody Loves Raymond along with several other members of the 1969 New York Mets.

In the mid-1970s, McGraw collaborated with artist Michael Witte on a nationally syndicated comic strip, Scroogie. Scroogie was a relief pitcher for the "Pets", whose teammates included "Tyrone" (a Reggie Jackson–like bopper with a tremendous ego), ace pitcher "Royce Rawls" (loosely based upon former Mets teammate, Tom Seaver), "Chico", a Hispanic shortstop with characteristics similar to Mario Mendoza, and "Homer", an intellectually challenged slugger who could send a ball into orbit. Their announcer, "Herb", wore loud sports coats reminiscent of former Mets announcer Lindsey Nelson, and the team was owned by Millicent Cashman. Actual major league teams and players were used in the comic strip during its two-year run.

McGraw, Witte, David Fisher and Neil Offer produced two books, Scroogie (1976) and Hello there, ball! (1977).

McGraw also recorded a version of the baseball poem "Casey at the Bat", accompanied by Peter Nero and the Philly Pops.

== Personal life ==
McGraw had a brief relationship in 1966 with Elizabeth "Betty" D'Agostino, a teenage neighbor and waitress, that resulted in a son, country music singer Tim McGraw. In his book "Ya Gotta Believe," McGraw wrote that after a night of sex she broke off contact and he "assumed she didn't like me and just moved on." At the time, McGraw was playing baseball for Jacksonville, while D'Agostino was a high school student. When she became pregnant, her parents forced D'Agostino to drop out of high school and move to Delhi, Louisiana to live with relatives, where she gave birth to Tim.

McGraw did not meet his son until his son was 11 years old, after Tim accidentally found his birth certificate in his mother's closet and inquired about his true father. McGraw told his son that he had another family and could not be a father to Tim, although Tim persevered in sending his father letters. In early 1985, with Tug's success differing from the financial difficulties of Betty, Betty filed suit and the State of Louisiana demanded $350,000 in back child support. Through a lawyer, McGraw then agreed to finance $42,000 for Tim's college education, take a paternity test, and meet with his son. At the meeting, they reconciled, and began to develop a closer relationship. In 1990, with his son's career first starting, Tug bought Tim a van for him and his band. In addition to Tim, McGraw had a son, Mark, and daughter, Cari, with his first wife Phyllis Kline, and a son, Matthew, with his wife Diane Hovenkamp-Robertson; he also had two stepsons, Christopher and Ian Hovenkamp.

=== Marine Corps Reserve service (1965) ===
After one season in Major League Baseball with the New York Mets, McGraw reported to the Marine Corps Recruit Depot Parris Island on September 23, 1965, along with fellow New York Mets pitcher Jim Bethke. He was trained as a rifleman on the M14 rifle and M60 machine gun. McGraw later reported to Marine Corps Base Camp Lejeune, where he (in his own words) became a "trained killer". Tug's younger brother Dennis was active in anti-war protests and the brothers would sometimes argue; however, Tug admitted that he was a "dove when it came to the way [the United States was] conducting the war".

=== Death ===
On March 12, 2003, McGraw was working as an instructor for the Phillies during spring training when he was hospitalized with a glioblastoma brain tumor. After surgery was performed to remove it, initial reports suggested the procedure had been successful, his chances for recovery were "excellent" and he would live "a long time". However, the tumor was not totally excised by the surgery and the malignancy returned in inoperable form. McGraw lived for over nine months after the initial surgery. His son Tim paid for costly experimental medicine and was involved in all decisions. In what would be his last public appearance, McGraw attended the closing ceremonies of Veterans Stadium in Philadelphia on September 28, 2003, where he recreated the final out of the Phillies' World Series triumph. McGraw died on January 5, 2004, at the home of his son Tim and Tim's wife Faith Hill in Brentwood, Tennessee. The Mets played the 2004 season with the words "Ya Gotta Believe" embroidered on their left shoulders in McGraw's honor and the Phillies wore a patch on their right shoulder featuring a shamrock in honor of McGraw and a banner reading "Pope" in honor of longtime Phillies executive Paul Owens, who had also died that winter. His son Tim's 2004 hit "Live Like You Were Dying" (written by Tim Nichols and Craig Wiseman) was recorded in his father's honor and the music video featured the clip of McGraw recording the final out of the 1980 World Series. The song was number 1 on the U.S. Billboard country music charts for seven weeks and was named the number 1 country song of 2004 by Billboard.

McGraw was cremated after his death. Nearly five years later, his son Tim McGraw spread a handful of his dad's ashes on the pitcher's mound at the Phillies current home park, Citizens Bank Park, in Game 3 of the 2008 World Series.

In 2023, after six Philadelphia Phillies players died prematurely of glioblastoma, a theory linked the brain cancer to toxic PFAS chemicals in the AstroTurf at Veterans Stadium; however, it cannot be proven definitively.

=== Philanthropy ===
In 2003, prior to his death, McGraw established The Tug McGraw Foundation to enhance the quality of life of children and adults with brain tumors. In 2009, it expanded programs to include posttraumatic stress disorder (PTSD) and traumatic brain injury (TBI). The foundation sponsored a photography class at Camp Pendleton to help 15 Marines as part of the recovery process from battlefield wounds.

== Honors and awards ==
In 1993, McGraw was inducted into the New York Mets Hall of Fame.

In 1999, the Philadelphia Phillies inducted McGraw into the Philadelphia Baseball Wall of Fame.

In 2004, following his death, the Philadelphia chapter of the Baseball Writers' Association of America renamed the annual Good Guy Award the Tug McGraw Good Guy Award.

In 2010, McGraw was inducted into the Philadelphia Sports Hall of Fame.

== Books ==
- McGraw, Tug with William C. Kashatus. Was It as Good for You? Tug McGraw & Friends Recall the 1980 World Series. Media, PA: McGraw & Co. Inc. 2000.
- McGraw, Tug with Don Yaeger. Ya Gotta Believe! My Roller-Coaster Life as a Screwball Pitcher and Part-Time Father, and My Hope-Filled Fight Against Brain Cancer. New York: New American Library, 2004.
- McGraw, Tug with Joseph Durso. Screwball. Boston: Houghton Mifflin, 1974.
- McGraw, Tug with Jürgen Spohn. Lumpy: A Baseball Fable. Philadelphia: Running Press, 1981.
