= Buzz Capra =

American baseball player (1947–2026)

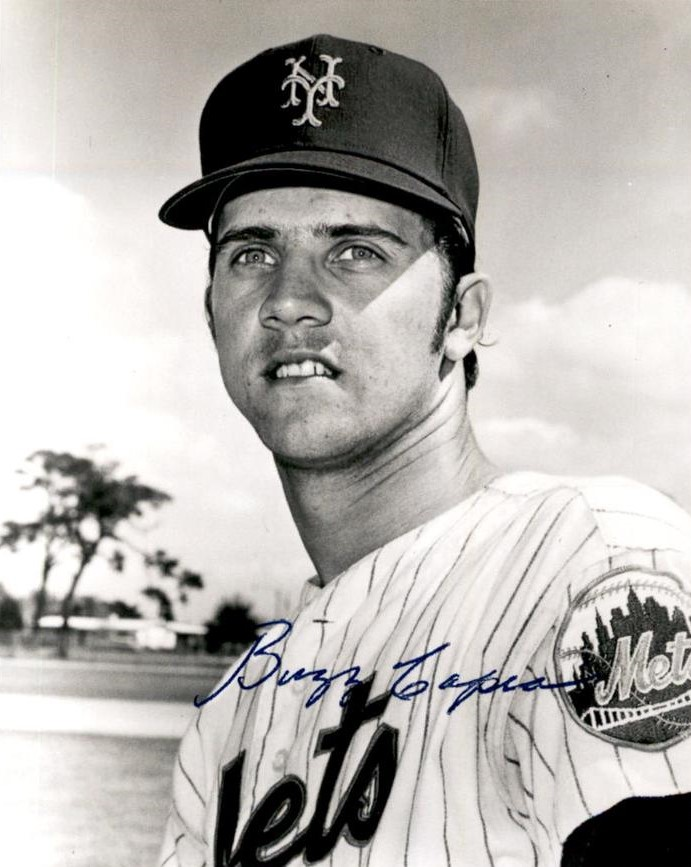
- Pitcher
- Born: October 1, 1947; Chicago, Illinois, U.S.
- Died: May 11, 2026 (aged 78); Joliet, Illinois, U.S.
- Batted: Right Threw: Right

MLB debut
- September 15, 1971, for the New York Mets

Last MLB appearance
- September 26, 1977, for the Atlanta Braves

MLB statistics
- Win–loss record: 31–37
- Earned run average: 3.87
- Strikeouts: 362
- Stats at Baseball Reference

Teams
- New York Mets (1971–1973); Atlanta Braves (1974–1977)

Career highlights and awards
- All-Star (1974); NL ERA leader (1974)

Lee William Capra (October 1, 1947 – May 11, 2026) was an American professional baseball pitcher, who played in Major League Baseball (MLB) for the New York Mets and Atlanta Braves, from 1971 to 1977. Nicknamed "Buzz", by a neighbor as a child, Capra was a National League (NL) All-Star and the NL earned run average (ERA) leader in 1974.

== Playing career ==
=== Early years ===
Capra was a shortstop at Lane Technical College Prep High School in the Roscoe Village neighborhood on the Northside of Chicago. Besides playing shortstop, he began pitching at Illinois State University, and compiled a 17–5 record & 1.58 ERA. Capra was a team co-captain his senior year, and led the Redbirds to the 1969 NCAA Division II Baseball Championship.

He was selected late in the 1969 Major League Baseball draft, by the New York Mets. Though primarily a pitcher, he played some shortstop and second base with the Pompano Beach Mets in 1969. He went 33–10 with a 2.49 ERA and 367 strikeouts, over three seasons in the Mets' farm system, to earn a September call-up in 1971.

=== New York Mets ===
In 1971, Capra made three appearances out of the bullpen, and did not allow an earned run in his first two big league appearances. However, he was not so lucky in his third appearance: Facing the St. Louis Cardinals at Shea Stadium, Capra entered the game in the tenth inning, and retired only one of the seven batters he faced, Jorge Roque, who bunted Joe Torre to second after Torre had led off the inning with a single), on his way to allowing five runs and taking his first major league loss.

Capra won his first major league start, over the San Diego Padres, on April 25, 1972; however, he found himself back in the minors by the All-Star break. Capra also split the 1973 season between the Mets & the Triple-A Tidewater Tides. While all ten of his Tidewater appearances were starts, he was used exclusively in relief at the major league level. Capra earned his first major league save, on June 27, 1973, against the Philadelphia Phillies, pitching four innings of no-hit ball. Although he was on the Mets’ 1973 World Series roster, he did not appear in the 1973 National League Championship Series or World Series. However, Capra was involved in a fight with Pedro Borbon during the infamous Game 3 ruckus between Pete Rose and Bud Harrelson.

=== Atlanta Braves ===
During spring training in 1974, the Mets sold Capra's contract to the Atlanta Braves. His record as a reliever stood at 0–2, with one save (earned the evening Hank Aaron hit his record-breaking 715th home run, on April 8, 1974), and a 3.06 ERA, when he replaced an injured Ron Reed, in the first inning, on May 15, against the Padres. Capra pitched six innings of one-hit ball to earn the win — and Reed's spot in the starting rotation.

Over his next three games, Capra went 2–0, with a 1.00 ERA. He allowed just three walks, while striking out fifteen, and began a Braves-record streak of 26 innings pitched without allowing an earned run. Over the month of June, Capra went 6–0 with a 1.05 ERA, three shutouts, and another complete game, to set a team record with nine consecutive wins, on his way to earning NL Player of the Month honors, and selection to the NL All-Star team by his former manager with the Mets, Yogi Berra. (He did not make an appearance in the game.)

During his winning streak Capra became a sensation in Atlanta. In a season in which the Braves averaged 12,112 attendance per home game, Capra's home starts in June and July averaged over 39,000. Capra cooled off during July and August (3-5, 4.43 ERA), but reverted to form in September, to end the season with a major league-best 2.28 ERA, 0.10 better than teammate, Phil Niekro (who finished second in the NL), and .21 better than American League (AL) leader, Catfish Hunter of the Oakland A's. He also held opposing batters to an NL-leading .208 batting average against (BAA).

Capra won his first two starts of the 1975 season; however, a twinge in his pitching arm — that he had begun feeling toward the end of the previous season — worsened. Capra lost his next four starts, and was shut down for the season on June 8, with a 4–7 record and 4.25 ERA.

He did not return to the Braves until September 1, 1976, and was roughed up by the Chicago Cubs, in his first game back. He was relegated to mop-up duty over his next four appearances, and ended the season 0–1 with an 8.68 ERA.

Capra's first game of the 1977 season also went poorly, but he pitched effectively enough in his next four appearances (3 earned runs in 11.1 innings, while holding opposing batters to a .179 batting average), to be placed in the starting rotation when an injury to Andy Messersmith opened a spot. He went 0–4 with an 8.55 ERA in four starts, before reverting to relief. Capra won his first game back in the bullpen, for his first win since he beat the Mets on May 25, 1975 (two days shy of two years earlier).

Messersmith suffered a second injury (on July 3), shutting him down for the season, and gave Capra a second shot at starting. He beat the Cincinnati Reds' "Big Red Machine," on July 13, then, on August 10, showed his old form against the Padres, allowing only two hits in nine innings, in an extra-inning game, where he was credited with a no-decision. Capra notched a win in the final game of his career, against the Houston Astros, September 26, 1977.

From the time Capra had re-entered the starting rotation, he had gone 2–4, with a 5.02 ERA, in sixteen starts over the remainder of the 1977 season. Overall, that season, Capra was 2–8, with a 5.84 ERA as a starter, and 4–3, with a 4.58 ERA in relief.

The Braves released Capra at the end of spring training, 1978, and he retired as a player, shortly thereafter.

== Coaching career ==
Following his playing career, Capra spent five years as the baseball coach for Northeastern Illinois University.

He went on to work as a minor league pitching coach in the Braves, Mets, Chicago White Sox, Montreal Expos, and Philadelphia Phillies organizations.

While attending Illinois State, Capra earned his degree in teaching, and taught ceramics at a Chicago high school during the offseason while still a player.

== Honors ==
Capra was inducted into the Illinois State Athletics Hall of Fame in 1975 as an individual and again in 1986 as a member of the 1969 championship team. Illinois State retired his No. 9 in 2003. He was elected to the Italian American Sports Hall of Fame in 2021.

== Death ==
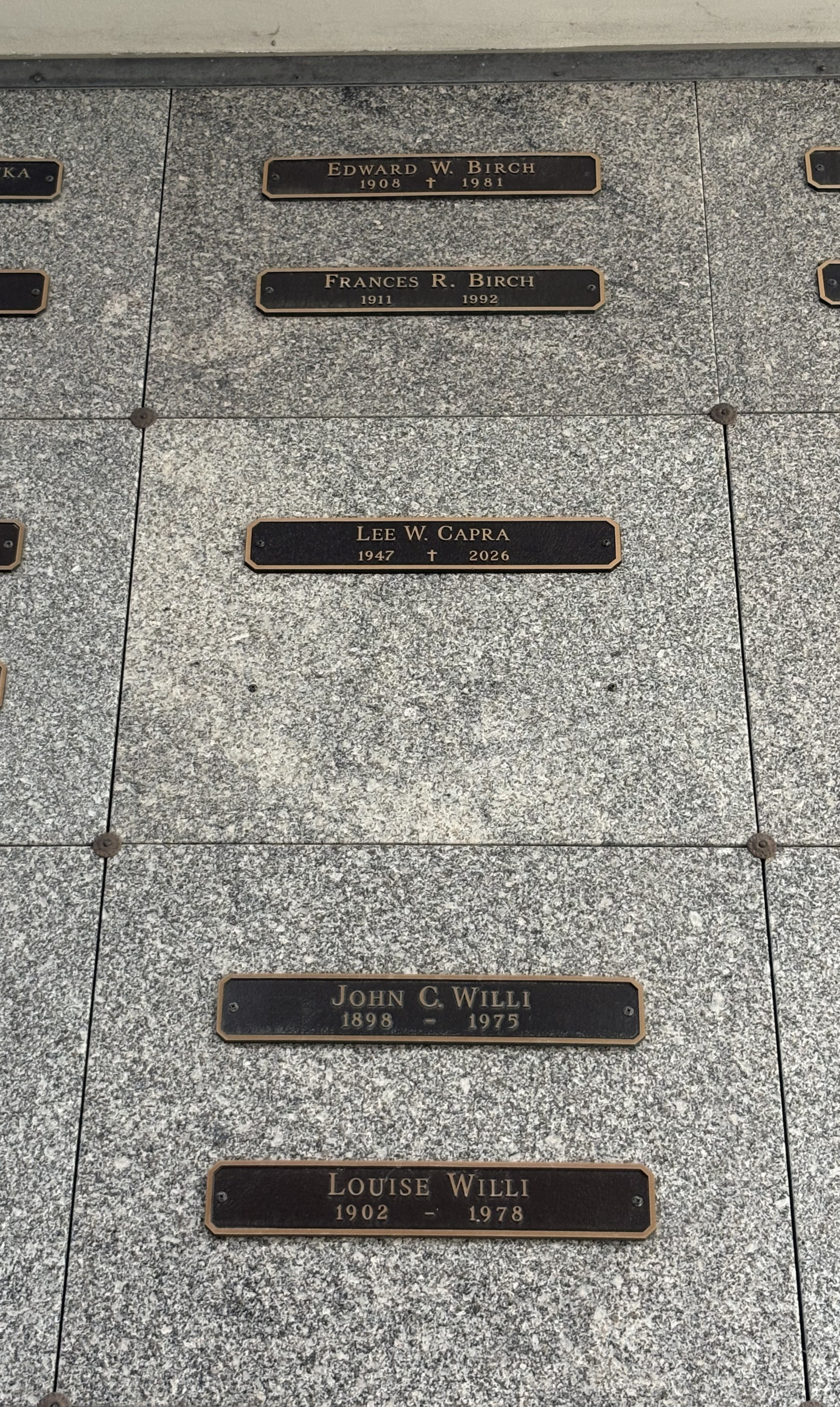
Capra's grave at St. Joseph Cemetery

Capra died in Joliet, Illinois on May 11, 2026, at the age of 78, and was interred at St. Joseph Cemetery in River Grove, Illinois.

== Career statistics ==
W	L	PCT	ERA	G	GS	CG	SHO	SV	IP	BF	H	ER	R	HR	BAA	K	BB	BB/9	WP	HBP	Fld%	Avg.
31	37	.456	3.87	142	61	16	5	5	544.1	2338	479	234	256	60	.237	362	258	4.3	18	10	.962	.135

== See also ==
- List of Major League Baseball annual ERA leaders

Preceded by Ralph Garr	National League Player of the Month; June, 1974	Succeeded by Don Gullett
Preceded by Mike Marshall	NL Player of the Week; June 30, 1974	Succeeded by Don Wilson & Steve Rogers
Preceded by Tom Seaver	Major League Baseball ERA leader 1974	Succeeded by Jim Palmer
