= Dave Schneck =

American baseball player (born 1949)

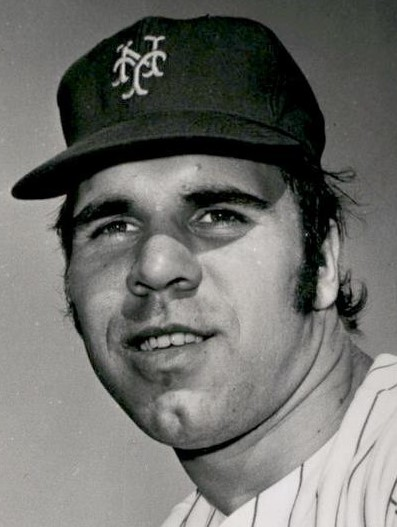
- Schneck's 1973 baseball card photo
- Outfielder
- Born: June 18, 1949 (age 77); Allentown, Pennsylvania, U.S.
- Batted: Left Threw: Left

MLB debut
- July 14, 1972, for the New York Mets

Last MLB appearance
- October 1, 1974, for the New York Mets

MLB statistics
- Batting average: .199
- Home runs: 8
- Runs batted in: 35
- Stats at Baseball Reference

Teams
- New York Mets (1972–1974)

David Lee Schneck (born June 18, 1949) is an American former Major League Baseball outfielder. He played parts of three seasons, from 1972 until 1974, with the New York Mets.

== Early life ==
Schneck was born in Allentown, Pennsylvania, on June 18, 1949. He graduated from Whitehall High School, where he was a pitcher.

In 1967, Schneck was drafted as a pitcher by the New York Mets, but he did not begin his professional career until 1968 due to a shoulder injury. He was converted into an outfielder, and he started 1968 with the rookie class Marion Mets.

At age 19, he was drafted into the United States Marine Corps and served 14 months in the Vietnam War.

== Major League Baseball ==
After missing the 1969 and 1970 seasons while serving in the Army, Schneck continued to progress through the minor leagues until 1972, when he made his Major League Baseball debut.

=== New York Mets ===
In 1974, after spending most of 1973 back in the minor leagues with the Tidewater Tides, Schneck received a long shot at the major league in 1974. He played 93 games with the New York Mets that season, batting .205 with 5 home runs. However, that proved to be the end of his Major League career.

Schneck went 2–11 at the plate on September 11, 1974, during a 25 inning marathon night game against the St. Louis Cardinals. Those 11 at bats tied a Major League record for most at bats in a game.

=== Philadelphia Phillies and Cincinnati Reds ===
On December 3, 1974, Schneck, Tug McGraw, and Don Hahn were traded to the Philadelphia Phillies by the Mets for Del Unser, John Stearns, and Mac Scarce at the Winter Meetings.

He started the 1975 season with their top farm club, the Toledo Mud Hens, and on August 5 he was traded to the Cincinnati Reds for John Vukovich. He played with their top farm team, the Indianapolis Indians, until the end of the 1976 season. During that offseason, he was traded again, this time to the Chicago Cubs, for outfielder Champ Summers. After playing one more season in the minors, for the Wichita Aeros, Schneck retired. Schneck currently owns a company known as Schneck Waterproofing in Northampton, Pennsylvania.
