= Bob Apodaca =

American baseball player and coach (born 1950)

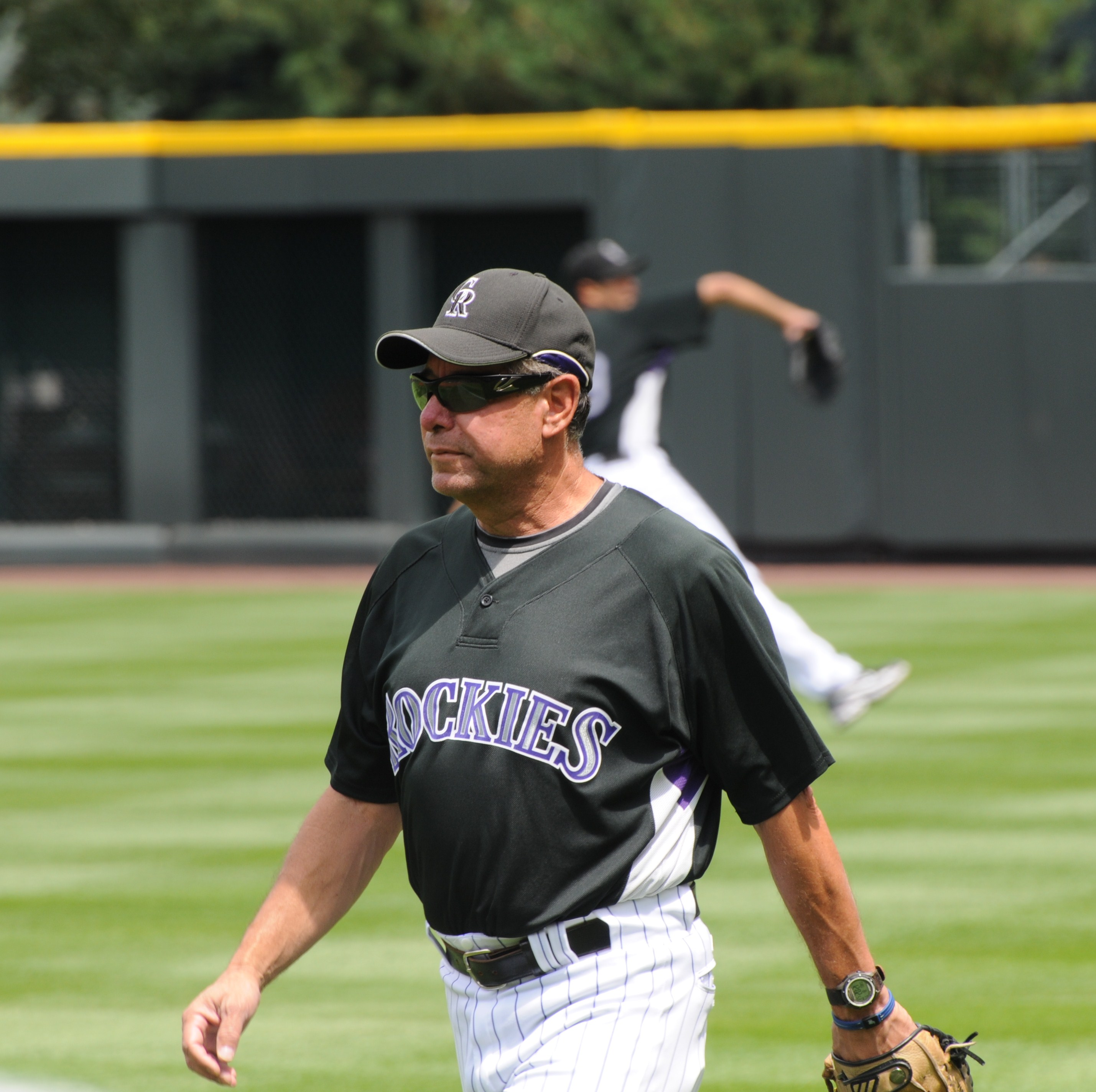
- Apodaca while serving as Colorado Rockies pitching coach
- Pitcher
- Born: January 31, 1950 (age 76); Los Angeles, California, U.S.
- Batted: Right Threw: Right

MLB debut
- September 18, 1973, for the New York Mets

Last MLB appearance
- September 18, 1977, for the New York Mets

MLB statistics
- Win–loss record: 16–25
- Earned run average: 2.86
- Strikeouts: 197
- Saves: 26
- Stats at Baseball Reference

Teams
- As player: New York Mets (1973–1977); As coach: New York Mets (1996–1999); Milwaukee Brewers (2000–2001); Colorado Rockies (2003–2012)

Robert John Apodaca (/ˌɑːpoʊˈdɑːkə/; born January 31, 1950) is a former American Major League Baseball pitcher, and an assistant to Colorado Rockies General manager Jeff Bridich. Since 2013, he has worked with pitchers in the Rockies' lower-level minor league affiliates.

== Early years ==
Apodaca played third base in high school, but converted to a pitcher at Cerritos College. After transferring to California State University, Los Angeles (where he was the Golden Eagles' MVP as a senior), he signed with the New York Mets as an amateur free agent in 1971. He spent three seasons in their farm system, going 24–11 with a 2.73 earned run average before making his major league debut as a September call-up in 1973. He faced two Pittsburgh Pirates batters, walking both. The first came around to score, giving Apodaca an infinite ERA in 1973.

== New York Mets ==
Apodaca won a spot in the Mets' bullpen in 1974, and earned his first career save in his first appearance of the season. His first career win came on May 13 as a starter against the St. Louis Cardinals and future Hall of Famer Bob Gibson. Overall, he went 6–6 with three saves and a 3.50 ERA in his rookie season.

He had a career year in 1975, when he led Mets relievers with thirteen saves and a 1.49 ERA. His 46 appearances were good enough for second best on the club, as were his 84.2 innings pitched out of the bullpen.

He remained a staple of the Mets' bullpen through 1977. During Spring training 1978, Apodaca tore a ligament in his right elbow, causing him to miss the entire season. He would pitch just four innings for the Mets' triple A affiliate, the Tidewater Tides, in 1979, and did not pitch at all in 1980.

== Coaching ==
After six games with the double A Jackson Mets in 1981, Apodaca retired and went into coaching. Immediately after stepping off the mound for good, he was hired as a coach with the Short-Season A ball Little Falls Mets of the New York–Penn League. He moved to the double A Jackson Mets in 1983 before moving to the Columbia Mets of the South Atlantic League from 1984 to 1987. In 1986, he was named SAL Pitching Coach of the Year when his staff went 90–42 with a 3.38 ERA.

In 1988, he served as pitching coach for the St. Lucie Mets under Clint Hurdle in Hurdle's first season as a professional manager. The two would work on and off together in the Mets' minor league system for the next couple of years until Apodaca became the Mets' major league pitching coach from 1996 to 1999.

He was the pitching coach for the Milwaukee Brewers from 2000 to 2001 before returning to St. Lucie in 2002. Early in the 2002 season, Hurdle replaced Buddy Bell as the Colorado Rockies manager. At the end of the season, he brought Apodaca in as his pitching coach.

Pitching in hitter friendly Coors Field the Rockies' pitching staff consistently finished with the National League's worst ERA. Since coming into existence in 1993, Rockies pitchers finished with the league's highest ERA in all but two seasons, finishing second to the Florida Marlins in 1998, and the Houston Astros in 2000. This trend continued until 2006, when the Rockies finished with the thirteenth (out of sixteen) best ERA in the league. This was due mostly to a cut in home runs allowed (155, third best in the NL, versus 175, eleventh in the NL in 2005).

The improvement continued until 2007, when the Rockies' 4.32 team ERA was eighth best in the league. Coupled with an offense that produced the league's best batting average and the second most runs scored, the Rockies reached the post season for the first time since 1995. Rockies pitching allowed just eight runs and held the Philadelphia Phillies to a .172 batting average to sweep the 2007 National League Division Series in three games. Likewise, they held the Arizona Diamondbacks to just eight runs in their four-game sweep of the 2007 National League Championship Series to head to the World Series for the first time in franchise history.

Apodaca remained the Rockies' pitching coach until June 26, 2012, when he asked to be reassigned, and was named Special Assistant to GM Dan O'Dowd. He was replaced by Jim Wright & Bo McLaughlin, who served as co-pitching coaches. It was under Apodaca's tutelage that Ubaldo Jiménez tossed the franchise's first and only no-hitter on April 17, 2010.

Apodaca spent four years as a roving minor league instructor from 2013 to 2017, and three years as pitching coach for Colorado's short-season A-level minor league affiliate the Boise Hawks from 2018 to 2020 before retiring from baseball following the 2020 season.

Sporting positions
Preceded by Mel Stottlemyre	New York Mets Pitching Coach; 1996–1999	Succeeded by Dave Wallace
Preceded by Bill Campbell	Milwaukee Brewers Pitching Coach; 2000–2001	Succeeded by Dave Stewart
Preceded by Jim Wright	Colorado Rockies Pitching Coach; 2003–2012	Succeeded by Jim Wright & Bo McLaughlin
