= Dave Augustine =

American baseball player (born 1949)

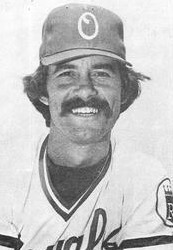
- Augustine in 1980
- Outfielder
- Born: November 28, 1949 (age 76); Follansbee, West Virginia, U.S.
- Batted: Right Threw: Right

MLB debut
- September 3, 1973, for the Pittsburgh Pirates

Last MLB appearance
- October 2, 1974, for the Pittsburgh Pirates

MLB statistics
- Batting average: .207
- Hits: 6
- Home runs: 0
- Runs batted in: 0
- Stats at Baseball Reference

Teams
- Pittsburgh Pirates (1973–1974)

David Ralph Augustine (born November 28, 1949) is an American former outfielder in Major League Baseball who played for the Pittsburgh Pirates during the 1973 and 1974 baseball seasons. He was drafted by the Cleveland Indians out of Miami Dade College in the 33rd round of the 1968 MLB June Amateur Draft.
