= Don Hahn (baseball) =

American baseball player (born 1948)

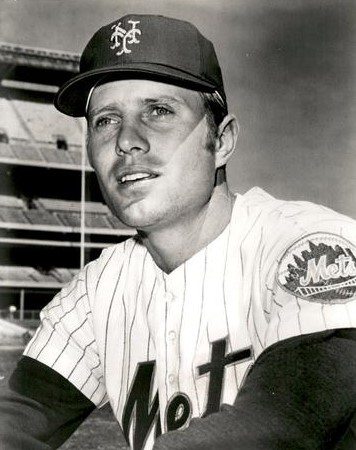
- Center fielder
- Born: November 16, 1948 (age 78); San Francisco, California, U.S.
- Batted: Right Threw: Right

MLB debut
- April 8, 1969, for the Montreal Expos

Last MLB appearance
- September 25, 1975, for the San Diego Padres

MLB statistics
- Batting average: .236
- Home runs: 7
- Runs batted in: 74
- Stats at Baseball Reference

Teams
- Montreal Expos (1969–1970); New York Mets (1971–1974); Philadelphia Phillies (1975); St. Louis Cardinals (1975); San Diego Padres (1975)

Donald Antone Hahn (born November 16, 1948) is an American former professional baseball outfielder, known primarily for his defensive abilities. Hahn played in Major League Baseball (MLB) for the Montreal Expos, New York Mets, Philadelphia Phillies, St. Louis Cardinals, and San Diego Padres.

Hahn attended Campbell High School in Campbell, California. There, along with his studies, he played baseball, basketball, and football. The right-handed throwing and batting Hahn was drafted by the San Francisco Giants in the 17th round of the 1966 Major League Baseball draft

On April 8, 1969, Hahn played in his first major league game; he was the starting center fielder in the Montreal Expos' first game. He also was the first fielder in Expo franchise history to field a ball; in the bottom of the first inning, the New York Mets' Tommie Agee singled to center field, and Hahn retrieved it and threw the ball to the cutoff man. The game was played at Shea Stadium in Flushing, New York, and the Expos defeated the Mets by a score of 11–10. Hahn's first major league at-bat came in the second inning of the game as he batted eighth in the lineup; he struck out. He went 0-for-3 before being taken out for Don Shaw.

Hahn later became quite accustomed to the Shea Stadium outfield grass; a few days before the 1971 MLB season began, the Mets traded 1969 World Series hero Ron Swoboda, along with minor leaguer Rich Hacker, to the Expos, in exchange for the young outfielder.

Hahn emerged as the starting center fielder for the pennant-winning Mets of 1973. Hahn started all 12 games for the Mets during post-season play. Earlier in '73, in July, Hahn was involved in a brutal collision in the outfield with left fielder George Theodore, which resulted in a dislocated hip for Theodore.

Hahn was traded along with Tug McGraw and Dave Schneck from the Mets to the Philadelphia Phillies for Del Unser, John Stearns, and Mac Scarce at the Winter Meetings on December 3, 1974.
