= Félix Millán =

Puerto Rican baseball player (born 1943)

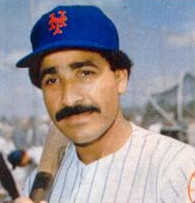
- Second baseman
- Born: August 21, 1943 (age 82); Yabucoa, Puerto Rico
- Batted: Right Threw: Right

Professional debut
- MLB: June 2, 1966, for the Atlanta Braves
- NPB: April 1, 1978, for the Yokohama Taiyo Whales

Last appearance
- MLB: August 12, 1977, for the New York Mets
- NPB: October 23, 1980, for the Yokohama Taiyo Whales

MLB statistics
- Batting average: .279
- Home runs: 22
- Runs batted in: 403

NPB statistics
- Batting average: .306
- Home runs: 12
- Runs batted in: 92
- Stats at Baseball Reference

Teams
- Atlanta Braves (1966–1972); New York Mets (1973–1977); Yokohama Taiyo Whales (1978–1980)

Career highlights and awards
- 3× All-Star (1969–1971); 2× Gold Glove Award (1969, 1972)

Félix Bernardo Millán Martínez (born August 21, 1943) is a Puerto Rican former professional baseball second baseman, who played in Major League Baseball (MLB) for the Atlanta Braves and New York Mets. He holds one of the best at-bat to strike out ratios in modern baseball history, having struck out once every twenty three at bats.

== Baseball career ==
Millán, nicknamed "the Cat" ("El Gato" in Spanish), was born in Yabucoa, Puerto Rico. In grade school, Millán played in a league sponsored by the Yabucoa police department and later served in the United States Army where he played baseball. He made his major league debut on June 2, 1966, with the Atlanta Braves, and played for Atlanta until 1973. He was primarily a second baseman. He played in two All-Star Games, the first in 1969 and the second in 1971; in 1970, he was named an All-Star, but was unable to participate due to injuries. Millán was acquired along with George Stone by the New York Mets from the Braves for Gary Gentry and Danny Frisella on November 1, 1972. The transaction fulfilled the Mets' need for a reliable everyday second baseman. In 1975, he became the first Met to appear in all 162 games during the season. He played for 12 years. His first game was June 2, 1966 for the Atlanta Braves and his final game was August 12, 1977 for the New York Mets. Due to incurring a shoulder injury because of an incident in that August 1977 game, one against the Pittsburgh Pirates, Millán was forced to retire. The incident, an altercation with Pirate catcher Ed Ott, began with the latter sliding hard into second base attempting to break up a double play. Millán consequently shouted at Ott and hit him in the jaw with a baseball in his hand. Ott, a former wrestler, answered this by picking Millan up and slamming him into his extended knee at Three Rivers Stadium, severely injuring his shoulder, and unfortunately ending Millán's MLB career.

On July 21, 1975, Joe Torre set a record for most double-plays grounded into in a single game (4), with Millán on first ahead of Torre. Millán had singled in all four of his at-bats. Torre said, "I'd like to thank Félix Millán for making all of this possible."

Millán was a prototypical "slap" or "contact" hitter and his 1976 Topps baseball card, #245, shows his unusual batting stance, as he choked up almost halfway on the bat.

Millán also played for three seasons in the Japanese Central League after leaving the majors. He joined the Yokohama Taiyo Whales in 1978, after the Whales bought his contract from the Mets, and played alongside Skip James. He won the batting title in his second year in Japan (1979) with a .346 batting average, and was given the Best Nine Award. He won the title with only 126 hits, barely having enough at-bats to qualify for the title. He did not play well the next year, and was released by the Whales after the 1980 season. In his three years in Japan, he had only 52 strikeouts in 1,139 at-bats.

== See also ==
- List of Major League Baseball single-game hits leaders
- List of Puerto Ricans
- List of Major League Baseball players from Puerto Rico
