= DiMuro =

DiMuro is a surname. Notable people with the surname include:

- Lou DiMuro (1931–1982), American baseball umpire
- Mike DiMuro (born 1967), American baseball umpire
- Ray DiMuro (born 1967), American baseball umpire, son of Lou and twin brother of Mike
