= Buddy Booker =

American baseball player (born 1942)

- Catcher
- Born: May 28, 1942 (age 84); Lynchburg, Virginia, U.S.
- Batted: Left Threw: Right

MLB debut
- June 4, 1966, for the Cleveland Indians

Last MLB appearance
- June 14, 1968, for the Chicago White Sox

MLB statistics
- Batting average: .182
- Home runs: 2
- Runs batted in: 5
- Stats at Baseball Reference

Teams
- Cleveland Indians (1966); Chicago White Sox (1968)

Richard Lee "Buddy" Booker (born May 28, 1942) is an American former professional baseball catcher who appeared in 23 games in Major League Baseball for the 1966 Cleveland Indians and 1968 Chicago White Sox. The native of Lynchburg, Virginia, batted left-handed, threw right-handed, and was listed as 5 feet 10 inches (1.78 m) tall and 170 pounds (77 kg).

== Baseball career ==
Booker began his 13-year pro career in the Pittsburgh Pirates' organization in 1961, and was selected that autumn by Cleveland in the first-year draft. He moved up through the Indians' system until his promotion to the American League club in June 1966.

He got into 18 games as a pinch hitter and catcher for the Indians that summer, and collected six hits and two bases on balls in 30 plate appearances. His hits included two home runs, struck June 18 off Ron Kline of the Washington Senators at D.C. Stadium, and Joe Sparma of the Detroit Tigers in the second game of a doubleheader at Tiger Stadium on July 17. But Cleveland sent Booker back to Triple-A, and during 1967, he was acquired by the New York Mets' organization.

Although he never appeared for the Mets' varsity, Booker would be included in a key trade during the 1967 winter meetings. On December 15, he was sent to the White Sox with pitchers Jack Fisher and Billy Wynne and outfielder Tommy Davis for infielder Al Weis and centerfielder Tommie Agee. The trade would prove pivotal for the Mets, as both Agee and Weis were key contributors to the 1969 "Miracle Mets" shocking World Series championship. Booker spent only one year in the White Sox' organization, playing at Triple-A Hawaii other than five early-season games, when he went hitless in five at bats as a catcher and pinch hitter. He spent the final five full seasons of his pro career in the minor leagues, and retired after the 1973 campaign.

In the majors, Booker batted .182 (6-for-33) with five runs batted in, as well as his two 1966 homers.
