= Karl Ehrhardt =

American baseball fan (1924–2008)

Karl Ehrhardt (November 26, 1924 – February 5, 2008) was one of the New York Mets' most visible fans and an icon at Shea Stadium from its opening in 1964 through 1981. Known as the "Sign Man", Ehrhardt held up 20-by-26-inch black cardboard signs with sayings in big white (sometimes orange) upper-cased paper characters that reflected the Mets' performance on the field, and echoed the fans' sentiments off of it. He usually brought a portfolio holding about sixty of his 1,200 signs to the stadium, each of them with color-coded file tabs for different situations. He was always positioned in the field-level box seats on the third base side, wearing a black derby with a royal-blue-and-orange band around the bottom of the crown and the primary Mets logo on the front. Ehrhardt wasn't afraid to criticize the team's front office, once holding up a sign that said "WELCOME TO GRANT'S TOMB", referring to the team's miserable play and M. Donald Grant, the team's chairman of the board.

== Personal life ==
Karl Kurt Ehrhardt was born in Unterweissbach, Germany. He emigrated with his family to the United States at the age of six, settling in Brooklyn, New York where he grew up rooting for the hometown Dodgers. During World War II he served in the U.S. Army as a translator in a prisoner-of-war camp holding captured German soldiers. Following the war, he graduated from Pratt Institute with a degree in design art. He later worked as a commercial artist designing advertisements for American Home Foods. He was a resident of the Glen Oaks section of Queens in New York City.

== The "Sign Man" at Met games ==
Ehrhardt attended Met games at Shea Stadium from its opening in 1964 through 1981, when he had a falling out with the Mets' off-field management. By then, he had accumulated about 1,200 homemade signs, and brought about 60 to each game. However, he was recognized as a superfan even in the Mets' early years, called the "Sign Man" by those who didn't know his name, and even acknowledged frequently on television broadcasts.

In 1969, Ehrhardt was selected as one of the Mets 25 Greatest Fans in a contest by Rheingold Breweries that brought 13,000 letters.

Ehrhardt was the subject of a feature by Heywood Hale Broun for a Saturday installment of the CBS Evening News in April 1969. The segment was reshown on ESPN Classic in 2003 as part of an episode of Woodie's World about Broun's coverage of the Miracle Mets.

Ehrhardt stopped going to Met games after the 1981 season. By then, the Mets had several consecutive non-competitive seasons and were considered losers. Ehrhardt said that the Mets, who had become a laughingstock, were no longer inviting him to team functions because of his criticisms of the team via his signs. "The front office was now run by new ownership, and they didn't like me criticizing the team," he said. "They turned their backs on me, so I just packed up my signs and went home."

However, the Mets persuaded Ehrhardt to help celebrate the franchise's 40th anniversary at a game on August 17, 2002, between the Mets and his once beloved Dodgers. He surprised everybody in attendance by holding a message high for fans to see: "THE SIGN MAN LIVES". It was a one-time appearance, and he did not return afterwards.

== A sampling of his messages ==
- "AMAZIN'!" – Based on the team's nickname which was first coined by Casey Stengel, the franchise's original manager.
- "MET POWER!" – Which he proudly displayed after Tommie Agee hit his leadoff home run in Game 3 of the 1969 World Series
- "JUST GREAT!"
- "BACK TO YOUR NEST, BIRD!" – Which appeared during the 1969 World Series against the Baltimore Orioles. This sign is seen in the highlight film during Game 5.
- "CAN YOU BELIEVE IT?"
- "CURSES! FOILED AGAIN"
- "AAUGHH" – Inspired by the Peanuts cartoon strip; it was often used when the Mets lost a game.
- "TOOTHLESS CUBS JUST A LOTTA LIP" – Which he displayed during Mets games against the fading Cubs in 1969, referring to Leo "The Lip" Durocher.
- "STIFFS"
- "NOT MANY OF US LEFT" – Raised in a sparse crowd of 10,406 fans on Opening Day in 1979, one of the Mets' drought years.
- "LOOK MA, NO HANDS" – Was shown when a slow grounder defied the grip of Mets' shortstop Frank Taveras at a summer Mets game in 1979.
- "JOSE, CAN YOU SEE?" – Presented when outfielder José Cardenal struck out at a 1979–1980 Mets game.
- "IT'S ALIVE! IT'S ALIVE!" – For weak hitters who rarely reached base. A head shot of Frankenstein's monster was to the left of the letters on the sign.
- "SIT DOWN, YA BUM!" – For whenever a Dodgers fan was caught poking fun at the Mets at a Mets' game; because, when they were in Brooklyn, the Dodgers were often called "Dem Bums".
- "LEAVE IT TO SEAVER" – Inspired by famous 1950s–1960s sitcom show, Leave It to Beaver; the sign was used for whenever Mets' pitcher Tom Seaver was called up to pitch.
- "A" and "G" – Which he held in each hand, raising and lowering each, to punctuate the crowd's chanting of center fielder Tommie Agee's name, after his second game-saving catch in Game 3 of the 1969 World Series.
- "DO YOUR THING HEYWOOD" – Flashed at Heywood Hale Broun at the end of his 1969 feature about Ehrhardt on the CBS Evening News.
- "BELIEVE IN MIRACLES?" – Flashed during the decisive Game 5 of the 1969 World Series.
- "BYE, BYE, BIRDIES" – Flashed during the same game.
- "THERE ARE NO WORDS" – The sign that Ehrhardt held up when the Mets' left fielder Cleon Jones caught the final out to clinch the team's first World Series Championship. This was his most famous creation, seen in the Series highlight film.
- "THEY SAID IT COULDN'T BE DONE" – Held high from a convertible, as Ehrhardt rode with the Mets' victory parade in the Canyon of Heroes in lower Manhattan.
- "NAILED BY THE (picture of a hammer)" – Held up after a home run was hit by slugging first baseman John Milner, whose nickname was "The Hammer".
- "YOU'RE FIRED!" – Held up during Game Three of the 1973 World Series when the Oakland Athletics committed an error. The sign referred to A's owner Charlie Finley's attempt to have infielder Mike Andrews removed from the team after a pair of difficult Game Two errors in the twelfth inning helped the Mets win the game.
- "KONG!" – For Dave Kingman's first regular season home run at home as a Met, helping to tag Kingman with the nickname King Kong.
- "THE KING OF SWING" – Another tribute to Kingman, drawing on the nickname given jazz legend Benny Goodman not to mention the "Sultan of Swat."
- "JUST ANOTHER GREEDY BUM" – A tribute to Kingman and a zap at the Mets front office, used on Opening Day in 1977, after a contract dispute during spring training.
- "WELCOME TO GRANT'S TOMB" – A swipe at then-Mets boss M. Donald Grant over the mishandling of Seaver's and Kingman's contract disputes leading to the so-called "Saturday Night Massacre" trades of both players, and the dwindling fan support that followed.
- "THE SIGNMAN LIVES!" – Used on his return to Shea Stadium at a game against the Los Angeles Dodgers in August 2002 to help celebrate the Mets' 40th anniversary.
