= Cleon Jones =

American baseball player (born 1942)

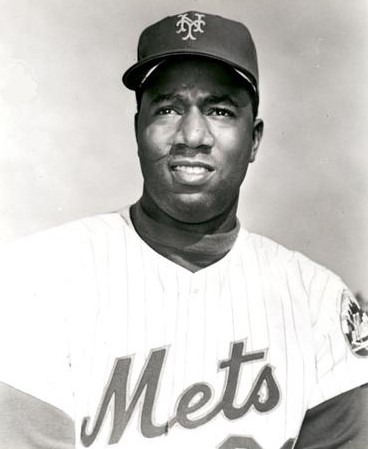
- Left fielder
- Born: June 24, 1942 (age 84); Mobile, Alabama, U.S.
- Batted: Right Threw: Left

MLB debut
- September 14, 1963, for the New York Mets

Last MLB appearance
- May 1, 1976, for the Chicago White Sox

MLB statistics
- Batting average: .281
- Home runs: 93
- Runs batted in: 524
- Stats at Baseball Reference

Teams
- New York Mets (1963, 1965–1975); Chicago White Sox (1976)

Career highlights and awards
- All-Star (1969); World Series champion (1969); New York Mets Hall of Fame

Cleon Joseph Jones (born June 24, 1942) is an American former professional baseball outfielder. He played in Major League Baseball as a left fielder. Jones played most of his career for the New York Mets and in 1969 caught the final out of the "Miracle Mets" World Series Championship over the Baltimore Orioles.

== Baseball career ==
=== Minor leagues ===
Jones played football and baseball at Mobile County Training School in Mobile, Alabama, and Alabama A&M University. With the Bulldogs, Jones scored 26 touchdowns in nine games. He also played baseball for the Grambling State Tigers of Grambling State University.

Jones signed with the New York Mets as an amateur free agent in 1962. After batting over .300 for both the Carolina League Raleigh Mets and New York–Penn League Auburn Mets in 1963, Jones received a September call-up to the major league club without having played double or triple A ball. He got two hits in 15 at-bats for a .133 batting average during his stint with the New York Mets.

After spending all of 1964 with the triple A Buffalo Bisons, Jones made the Mets out of spring training and was in the 1965 season opener against the Los Angeles Dodgers. Jones was demoted to Buffalo on May 2 with a .156 batting average. He again received a call up to New York that September, and hit his first major league home run on September 22 against the Pittsburgh Pirates. He finished the season with a .149 batting average.

=== New York Mets ===
Jones was awarded the starting center fielder job in 1966, and batted .275 with eight home runs, 57 runs batted in (RBIs) and 16 stolen bases to finish tied for fourth in National League Rookie of the Year balloting. His batting average dipped to .246 in 1967, and he ended up sharing playing time in center field with Larry Stahl. Following the season, the Mets acquired Jones' childhood friend Tommie Agee from the Chicago White Sox. Jones was moved to left field with the former Gold Glove-winner Agee playing center field.

Jones began the 1968 season platooning with Art Shamsky in left. He was batting .205 on May 18, when he went three for four with a home run, two RBIs and two runs scored to lift the Mets to a 5–2 victory over the Atlanta Braves. From there, Jones began to hit; perhaps the finest game of his career occurred on July 16 at Connie Mack Stadium in Philadelphia, when Jones went four for six with three RBIs and a run scored, and played all three outfield positions. He ended the season with a .297 batting average, which was sixth best in the National League.

=== Amazin' Mets ===
Jones was batting .341 with ten home runs and 56 RBIs in the first half of 1969 earning the starting left field job for the All-Star Game. He went two for four with two runs scored in the NL's 9–3 victory. He hit a home run in the first game after the break, and emerged as the hitting star of the surprising Mets, with a team-leading batting average of .340. The Amazins found themselves in second place, five games back of the Chicago Cubs in the newly aligned National League East when the Houston Astros came to Shea Stadium for a July 30 double header.

=== July 30, 1969 ===
After losing the first game 16–3, the Mets were down 7–0 in the third inning of the second game when Johnny Edwards hit a double to Jones in left field to make the score 8–0. Mets manager Gil Hodges emerged from the dugout, walked past Nolan Ryan on the mound, and walked all the way out to left field. A few minutes later, Hodges walked back to the dugout, with Jones a few paces behind him, and replaced Jones in left with Ron Swoboda. Newspapers at the time said Jones suffered a leg injury and he was not in the Mets lineup for several games after July 30. Other reporters opined that Jones was removed for failure to hustle, and still others suggested the effect of Hodges’s decision sent a message to the whole team: that he would not tolerate a lack of effort on his team, not even from its star player.

On August 22, 2009, following pre-game ceremonies honoring the 40th anniversary of the "Miracle Mets", Jones discussed the incident during SportsNet New York's telecast of that night's game. Jones said Hodges asked him why he did not look good going after a fly ball on the previous play. According to Jones, he pointed down to the water-filled turf. Jones said he reminded Hodges of his leg injury, and that the conditions on the field made it difficult for him to play his best. Jones said Hodges agreed, that he shouldn’t be playing, and they walked off the field together. Jones explained that Hodges was his favorite manager, and that he would never publicly embarrass a player. According to Jones, neither party ever revealed the contents of the conversation. Jones believes that the fear instilled in other players by the incident was the turning point in the season.

=== World Series champions ===
The Mets won 38 of their last 50 games, and finished the 1969 season with 100 wins —- eight games better than the second place Cubs.

Jones ended the season with a .340 batting average, which was third in the league behind Pete Rose and Roberto Clemente, and was second on the team in home runs, RBIs and runs scored, behind Tommie Agee in all three categories.

Jones batted a stellar .429 in the Mets' three game sweep of the Atlanta Braves in the 1969 National League Championship Series. In game two of the series, Jones went three for five with a home run, two runs scored and three RBIs in the Mets' 11–6 victory.

The Mets were heavy underdogs in the 1969 World Series but took a 3–1 series lead. The Orioles were ahead 3–0 in game five when Jones led off the sixth inning. Dave McNally struck Jones in the foot with a pitch, however, home plate umpire Lou DiMuro ruled that the ball missed Jones. Gil Hodges emerged from the dugout to argue, and showed DiMuro the shoe-polish smudged ball. DiMuro reversed his call, and awarded Jones first base. The following batter, Donn Clendenon, hit a two-run home run to pull the Mets within a run of Baltimore. The play was featured in the 2000 movie Frequency.

Following an Al Weis solo home run in the seventh to tie the game, Jones led off the eighth inning with a double off the wall that missed being a home run by about 2 ft (0.61 m), and scored on Ron Swoboda's double two batters later. With the Mets leading 5–3 in the ninth inning, Orioles second baseman Davey Johnson hit a 2-1 fastball which Jones caught near the warning track to win the World Series.

=== 1973 World Series ===
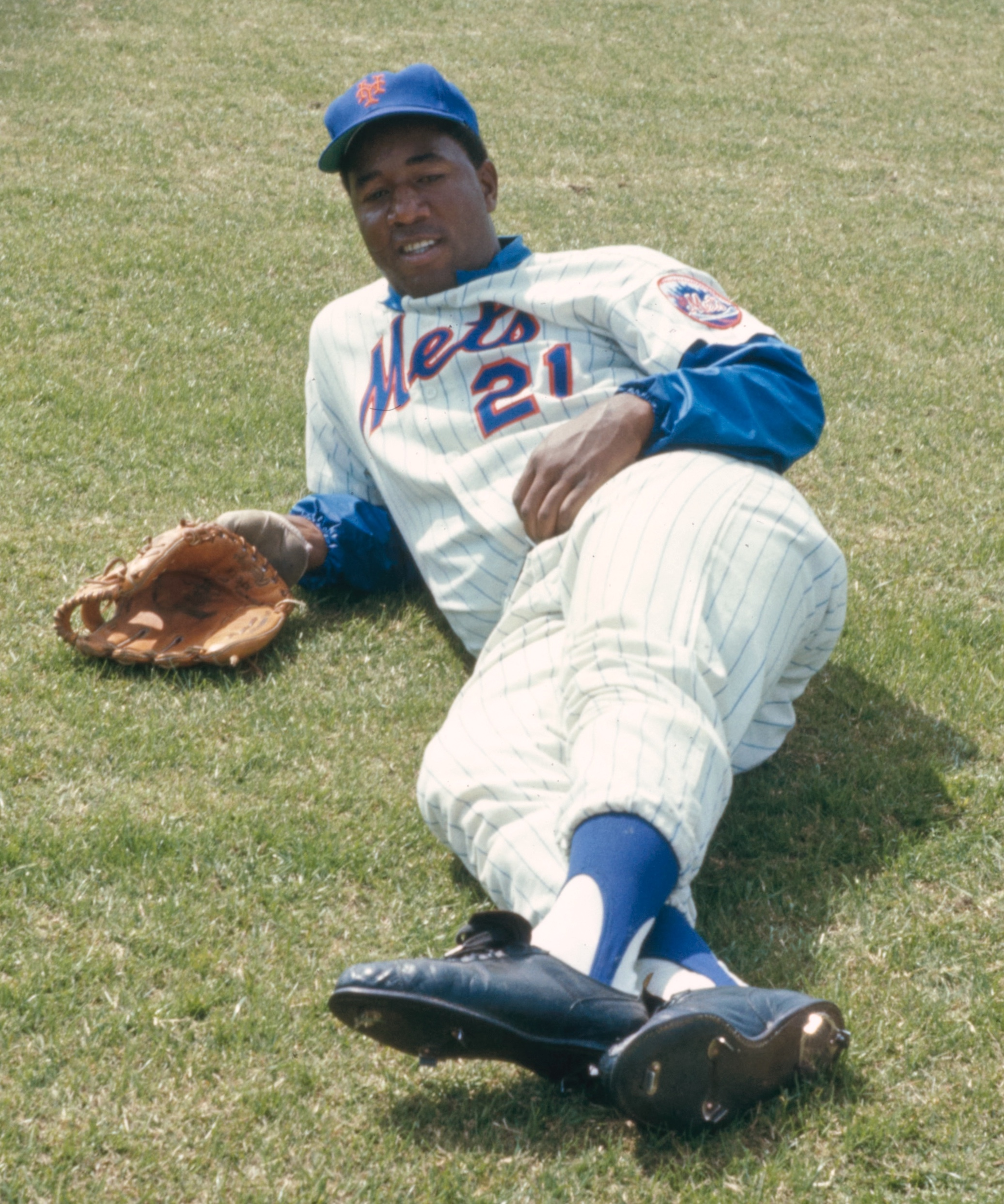
Jones with the Mets during spring training in 1970

Early in the 1970 season, Jones suffered through the worst slump in his career that saw his batting average reach .167 on May 26. His average improved to .251 by the time he began a then-club record 23-game hitting streak on August 25. For the season, he wound up hitting .277. In 1971, Jones was again a .300 hitter, as he was seventh in the league with a .319 batting average.

In 1972, Jones platooned with John Milner in left field. He played twenty games at first base, but not very well, and endured one of his worst seasons. The following season, Milner was shifted to first with Jones once again in left field.

In the 1973 season opener, Jones had his first career two home run game against the Philadelphia Phillies. He had his second on September 19, against the Pittsburgh Pirates in the first game of a crucial three game series at Shea for first place. The following day, Jones started one of the most memorable plays in Mets history, what has become known as the "Ball on the Wall Play". In the top of the 13th inning, with Richie Zisk on first, Dave Augustine hit what appeared to be a home run over the left field wall. Jones turned to play the ball off the wall and the ball hit the top of the wall and went right into Jones' glove on the fly. He turned and threw to relay man Wayne Garrett, who threw home to catcher Ron Hodges to nail Zisk at the plate. Following this miracle play, the Mets won the game in the bottom half of the inning to move within half a game of the first place Pirates. Jones caught fire at the end of the season, hitting six homers in the last ten games of the season to lead the Mets to the pennant. The Mets won the Eastern Division title on the last day of the season with a record of 82-79 but went on to demonstrate that it was no fluke when they upset the "Big Red Machine" in the National League Championship Series. Jones went three for five with two RBIs and a run scored in the series clincher.

The Mets lost in seven games to the Oakland Athletics in the 1973 World Series. For his part, Jones batted .286 with a home run in Game 2, and scored one of the four runs the Mets scored in the 12th inning of their Game 2 victory.

=== Incident in 1975 ===
Jones suffered a knee injury, and was out on extended spring training when the 1975 season started. At 5:00 a.m. on May 4, Jones was arrested and charged with indecent exposure in St. Petersburg, Florida. Police officers found him asleep in a station wagon with 21-year-old Sharon Ann Sabol, who was charged with possession of marijuana. Jones said he did not know Sabol, but was giving her a ride home in a friend's borrowed station wagon which he borrowed to go fishing the next morning, which ran out of gas, and that he had fallen asleep fully clothed in the driver's seat, except for his shoes, waiting for help, with Sabol in the back seat fully clothed. Having to file a report, police reported that Jones and Sabol were each asleep nude in the back of the station wagon. The charges were later dropped, but chairman of the New York Mets M. Donald Grant fined Jones $2,000, four times as much as a Met had ever been assessed before, and forced him to publicly apologize during a press conference held in New York. Jones apologized with his wife Angela, his high school sweetheart, by his side. He and Angela have been married for more than 50 years.

== Retirement ==
Jones rejoined the Mets on May 27. He was batting .240, mostly as a pinch hitter, when he was released by the Mets on July 18 after an altercation with manager Yogi Berra. He was acquired by the Chicago White Sox in 1976. He was released 13 games into the season with a .200 batting average, and retired afterwards.

Seasons	Games	AB	Runs	Hits	2B	3B	HR	RBI	SB	CS	BB	SO	Avg.	Slg.	OPS	Fld%
13	1213	4263	565	1196	183	33	93	524	91	48	360	702	.281	.404	.744	.979

Jones earned a reputation as an outfielder with one of the strongest arms in the National League. For his career, he had 64 outfield assists, including ten in 1966 and 1970.

In 1981, Jones was hired by Frank Cashen of the New York Mets to play a key role as a minor-league hitting coach. Jones helped shape the careers of future Met stars, including Kevin Mitchell, who figured prominently in the 1986 World Series Championship.

== Honors ==
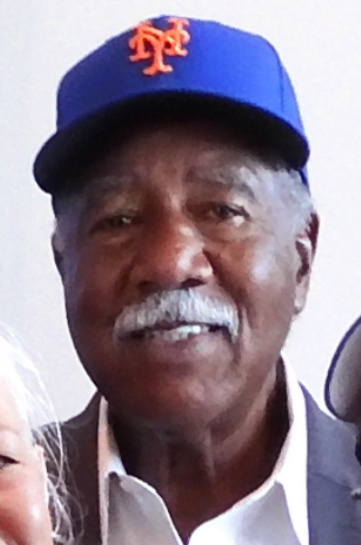
Jones in 2019

Jones was inducted into the New York Mets Hall of Fame in 1991. His .340 average in 1969 remained a team record until John Olerud batted .354 in 1998. Jones remains among the team's all-time leaders in games played, at bats, and hits.

Jones is a member of the Alabama Sports Hall of Fame, and a member of the Mobile Sports Hall of Fame.

In June 2012, Jones was selected as the Mets' "All-Time Leftfielder" by a panel of sports writers and broadcasters, an honor which he said "means a lot to me."

On November 14, 2021, Jones was inducted into the New York State Baseball Hall of Fame during a ceremonial dinner in Troy, New York. His wife of 57 years, Angela, was by his side.

== After baseball ==
He appeared as himself in a 1999 episode of Everybody Loves Raymond along with several other members of the 1969 Mets. The hip-hop duo The High & Mighty mention Jones in their song entitled "B-Boy Document '99."

Men in Black 3 features a scene that re-enacts a few moments of the 1969 World Series, which mentions Jones, and depicts his catching of the fly ball off the bat of Davey Johnson that ended the Fall Classic.

Jones resides in his native Mobile where he and his wife, Angela, refurbish homes of senior residents of the Africatown section of Mobile.

Jones' autobiography Coming Home: My Amazin' Life with the New York Mets was published in August 2022.
