= Al Weis =

American baseball player (born 1938)

- Second baseman / Shortstop
- Born: April 2, 1938 (age 88); Franklin Square, New York, U.S.
- Batted: Switch Threw: Right

MLB debut
- September 15, 1962, for the Chicago White Sox

Last MLB appearance
- June 23, 1971, for the New York Mets

MLB statistics
- Batting average: .219
- Home runs: 7
- Runs batted in: 115
- Stats at Baseball Reference

Teams
- Chicago White Sox (1962–1967); New York Mets (1968–1971)

Career highlights and awards
- World Series champion (1969)

Albert John Weis (born April 2, 1938) is an American former professional baseball player. He played in Major League Baseball as an infielder from 1962 to 1971 for the Chicago White Sox and the New York Mets. A light-hitting batter with only seven career home runs, he is notable for hitting a dramatic home run in Game 5 of the 1969 World Series. He was a switch hitter until the end of the 1968 season, after which he batted exclusively right-handed.

== Early years ==
Weis grew up in Bethpage, New York, and graduated from Farmingdale High School in 1955. He was a high school teammate of pitcher Jack Lamabe, with whom he was teammates on the Chicago White Sox in 1966 and 1967.

Weis joined the United States Navy after high school. It was playing baseball at Naval Station Norfolk where Weis caught the eye of the White Sox, with whom he signed as an amateur free agent in 1959. After four years in their farm system, in which he batted .266 with fifteen home runs and 159 runs batted in, Weis received a September call-up in 1962, batting only .083 in seven games.

== Chicago White Sox ==
Weis played 99 games as a utility infielder in his rookie season of 1963, with 48 of those games at second base and 27 at shortstop. Following the trade of Nellie Fox during the off-season, Weis became more of a second baseman in 1964, although he still made nine appearances at shortstop, including 4 starts. He batted .247 and established career highs with 81 hits and 22 stolen bases, second in the American League to Hall of Famer Luis Aparicio. That year, the White Sox finished second in a tight American League pennant race, one game behind the New York Yankees and one game ahead of the Baltimore Orioles.

Don Buford was named the everyday White Sox second baseman for the 1965 season, with Weis returning to utility infield duties. He remained in that role for the remainder of his tenure with the White Sox, which ended on June 27, 1967, when the Baltimore Orioles’ Frank Robinson broke Weis' leg while sliding into second to break up a double play. After the season, he and former Rookie of the Year center fielder Tommie Agee were traded to the New York Mets for Tommy Davis, Jack Fisher, Buddy Booker and Billy Wynne.

== New York Mets ==
Though Mets manager Gil Hodges acquired Weis primarily for his glove, he earned the dubious distinction of being the player whose error ended the longest game by time in Major League Baseball history on April 15, 1968 in his Mets debut. In the bottom of the 24th inning against the Houston Astros in the Astrodome, Weis allowed Bob Aspromonte's bases-loaded ground ball to go through his legs, scoring Norm Miller with the lone run of the game. For the season, Weis batted .172 with one home run and twelve RBIs, backing up Bud Harrelson and Ken Boswell at the middle infield positions.

On July 15, 1969, facing the first place Chicago Cubs at Wrigley Field, he hit a three-run home run off former Met Dick Selma to lead the second place Mets to a 5–4 victory. Weis hit his second of two home runs for the season the following day, and the Mets won again to close the gap to just four games in the National League East.

The Cubs widened that gap back up to ten games before the Mets began the improbable surge that saw them take first place on September 10, and win the division by eight games to face the Atlanta Braves in the first ever National League Championship Series. Ken Boswell was the star of the 1969 National League Championship Series, hitting two home runs, and leading his team with five RBIs. Weis, meanwhile, only logged one at bat, reaching first on a Clete Boyer error in the ninth inning of game two. However, he received far more playing time in the World Series.

The National League and American League's Cy Young Award winners faced off in game one of the World Series. The Orioles scored four runs in five innings off Tom Seaver. Meanwhile, Mike Cuellar pitched a complete game, with Weis' sacrifice fly in the seventh inning accounting for the only Mets run. In Game 2, Weis came to the plate with two outs in the ninth inning. With runners on first and third, Weis singled to left field to drive in the game winning run.

Koosman and McNally faced each other again in game five, with the Mets holding a commanding three-to-one game lead. McNally got his team on the board first with a two-run home run in the third. Three batters later, Frank Robinson hit a solo home run to bring the Orioles' lead to 3–0. Donn Clendenon's two run shot in the sixth brought the score to 3–2. Leading off the seventh, Weis took McNally deep to left field to tie the game. The Mets scored two runs in the bottom of the eighth to seal their improbable World Series win.

For the series, the career .219 hitter batted .455 with three RBIs. Clendenon was named World Series MVP, while Weis received the Series' Babe Ruth Award.

Weis' playing time in the second half of the 1970 season diminished substantially when former first overall draft pick Tim Foli was brought up to the majors. He was released by the Mets midway through the 1971 season, having appeared in just eleven games that year.

== Career statistics ==
Games	PA	AB	Runs	Hits	2B	3B	HR	RBI	SB	BB	HBP	SO	Avg.	OBP	Slg.	Fld%
800	1761	1578	195	346	45	11	7	115	55	117	14	299	.219	.278	.275	.965

As the weather got hot, so did Weis. He batted .260 with two home runs and 25 RBIs in the month of July for his career, far better than any other month. Weis fared far better against lefties than righties, having hit five of his seven career home runs with a .235 average against southpaws. All seven of his regular season home runs were hit as a visiting player. The only home run he ever hit in a home stadium was the World Series home run off McNally at Shea Stadium. McNally is also the only pitcher Weis has hit two home runs against, serving up his second career home run on June 18, 1964.
