= Ron Swoboda =

American baseball player (born 1944)

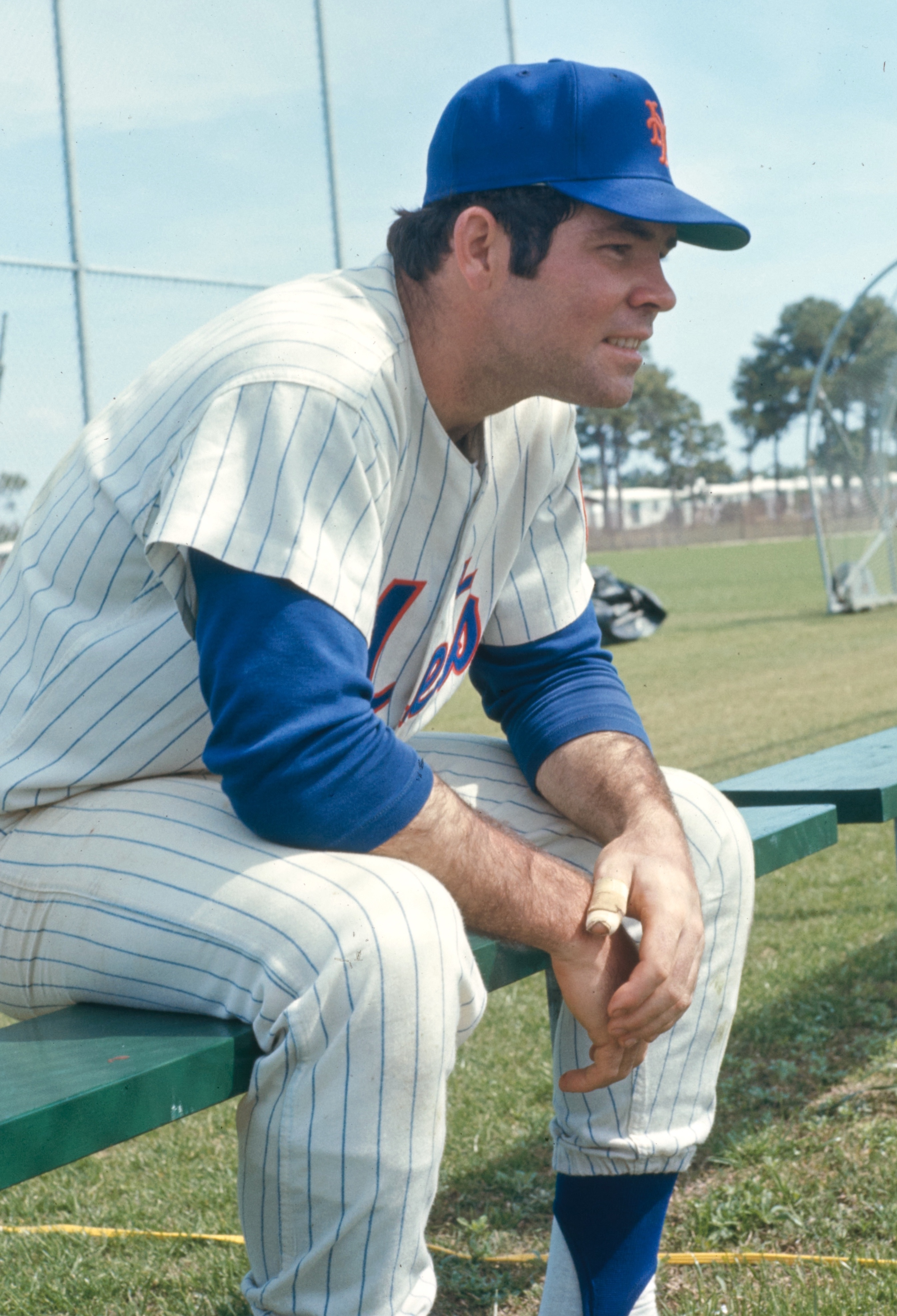
- Swoboda in 1970
- Outfielder
- Born: June 30, 1944 (age 82); Baltimore, Maryland, U.S.
- Batted: Right Threw: Right

MLB debut
- April 12, 1965, for the New York Mets

Last MLB appearance
- September 30, 1973, for the New York Yankees

MLB statistics
- Batting average: .242
- Home runs: 73
- Runs batted in: 344
- Stats at Baseball Reference

Teams
- New York Mets (1965–1970); Montreal Expos (1971); New York Yankees (1971–1973)

Career highlights and awards
- World Series champion (1969)

Ronald Alan Swoboda (born June 30, 1944) is an American former professional baseball player and television sports color commentator. He played in Major League Baseball as an outfielder from 1965 through 1973, most notably as a member of the New York Mets team that became known as the Miracle Mets when they rose from being perennial losers to defeat the favored Baltimore Orioles in the 1969 World Series for one of the most improbable upsets in World Series history. Swoboda executed one of the most impressive defensive plays of the series in the ninth inning of Game 4 to help preserve a Mets victory. He also played for the Montreal Expos and the New York Yankees.

== Major league debut ==
Swoboda was born in Baltimore, Maryland where he graduated from Sparrows Point High School. He then played for one season at the University of Maryland, and after an impressive showing in the AAABA tournament in Johnstown, Pennsylvania, Swoboda was offered a $35,000 contract to sign with the New York Mets by scout Pete Gebrian on September 5, 1963.

Swoboda spent only one season in the Mets' farm system in AA with the Williamsport Mets before making the Major League team in spring training, 1965. At the age of 20 he made his major league debut as a pinch hitter in the season opener, and lined out in his only at-bat. He pinch hit, again, in the second game of the season, this time hitting an 11th-inning home run (the Mets still lost, as the Houston Astros had scored four runs in the top of the inning). He homered again in his first at-bat on April 18, giving him two home runs in his first four Major League at-bats.

Swoboda hit 15 home runs by the All-Star break, the most ever by a Mets rookie in the first half of a season until Pete Alonso broke his record with 25 home runs in 2019. Swoboda commented during a television interview that he loved hitting fastballs; then he began seeing a lot more breaking balls and hit only four more home runs in the season. Still, his 19 home runs stood as a Mets rookie record until Darryl Strawberry's 26 in 1983. His rookie fielding percentage was a below-league-average .947, however, he had nine outfield assists. For his efforts, he was selected to the 1965 Topps All-Star Rookie Team. His 1966 Topps baseball card was imprinted with a gold trophy symbol. In the 1966 movie Penelope, Natalie Wood, as the title character, opens a pack of 1966 Topps baseball cards, sees Swoboda's rookie card, and asks police lieutenant Horatio Bixbee (Peter Falk) "Who's Ron Swoboda?"

== 1966 to 1968 ==
Swoboda wore number 14 as a rookie in 1965. When the Mets acquired third baseman Ken Boyer from the St. Louis Cardinals prior to the start of the 1966 season, they granted him number 14, as he'd worn it in St. Louis. Swoboda wore number 17 briefly during spring training in 1966, then switched to number 4. His home run drought continued through the 1966 season, when he hit only eight home runs and batted .222, with 50 runs batted in.

During his early years with the Mets, Swoboda acquired the nickname "Rocky" as a result of his less-than-reliable fielding. Although he possessed a strong, accurate throwing arm, a fly ball hit in his direction was by no means a sure out. After having spent most of his time in left field his first two seasons, Swoboda was shifted to first base in 1967 to make room for newly acquired Tommy Davis in left. Swoboda's fielding at first was no better, and he was soon shifted to right field. Offensively, he had perhaps his best season, hitting .281 with 13 home runs and 53 RBIs. He led the Mets with six triples and a career-high 59 RBIs in 1968, and also had a career-high 14 outfield assists.

== Miracle Mets ==
By May 21, 1969, the Mets won their third game in a row for a .500 winning percentage 36 games into the season for the first time in franchise history. This was followed by a five-game losing streak that saw the team fall into fourth place in the newly aligned National League East.

The Mets then went on an eleven-game winning streak that brought them back into second place, seven games behind the Chicago Cubs. On September 10 the Mets swept a doubleheader against the Montreal Expos. Coupled with a loss by the Cubs, the Mets found themselves in first place for the first time in franchise history. On September 13, Swoboda hit a grand slam against the Pittsburgh Pirates to propel the Mets to a 5–2 victory. Two days later, as the St. Louis Cardinals' Steve Carlton struck out a record nineteen Mets batters in a losing effort, the Mets defeated the Cards 4–3 at Busch Memorial Stadium on a pair of two-run home runs by Swoboda. On September 24, facing Carlton and the Cardinals again, this time at Shea Stadium, the Mets clinched the NL East as Donn Clendenon hit two home runs in a 6–0 Mets victory. The Mets won 38 of their last 49 games, and finished the season with 100 wins against 62 losses, eight games ahead of the second-place Cubs.

=== 1969 World Series ===
Swoboda did not appear in the Mets' 1969 National League Championship Series three-game sweep of the Atlanta Braves to reach the World Series. The Mets were heavy underdogs heading into the 1969 World Series against the Baltimore Orioles. In Game 4, Swoboda, not known for his fielding, made a spectacular catch of a ball hit by Brooks Robinson in the ninth inning to stop an Orioles rally. The Mets won the game 2–1 in ten innings, and subsequently, the World Series. For the World Series, Swoboda batted .400. His only RBI was the game winner of the fifth and final game.

A photograph of Swoboda, stretched almost horizontally, just inches off the ground, became an iconic image for Mets fans. The Right Field entrance gate of Citi Field, the current home of the Mets, features a metal silhouette of a baseball player making a diving catch similar to the one Swoboda made during the 1969 Series.

== Trades ==
In March 1971, Swoboda and minor-leaguer Rich Hacker were traded to the Montreal Expos in exchange for young outfielder Don Hahn. Three months later, the Expos traded Swoboda to the New York Yankees in exchange for outfielder Ron Woods. Swoboda played in his final major league game on September 30, 1973, at the age of 29 and was released by the Yankees at the end of the 1973 season. He was signed by the Atlanta Braves during spring training of 1974. The Braves, however, released him on March 25, 1974, after which Swoboda retired from baseball. He attempted an unsuccessful comeback with the Mets during spring training in 1976.

== Post-retirement ==
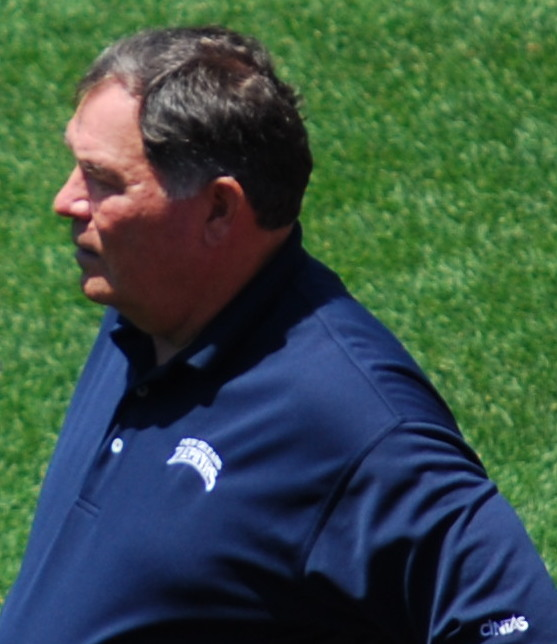
Swoboda in 2009

After his retirement from baseball, Swoboda worked as a television sportscaster in New York City on WCBS-TV, on WISN-TV in Milwaukee, and for many years at WVUE in New Orleans. He also worked at Cox Sports Television. Swoboda was the color commentator for telecasts of games played by the New Orleans Baby Cakes, the AAA farm club of the Miami Marlins before the team relocated to Wichita, Kansas after the 2019 season.He was also a recipient of the Thurman Munson Award in February 2009.

He appeared as himself in a 1999 episode of Everybody Loves Raymond along with several other members of the 1969 Mets. Swoboda was referenced by Homer Simpson in the episode MoneyBart.

Swoboda is mostly remembered for his dramatic defensive gem during the 1969 World Series. In a guest column for the New York Daily News, Swoboda wrote, "I'm kidded, occasionally, by folks who wonder: 'How long are you going to keep living off of one catch?' My answer: 'How long have I got left?'"

On June 11, 2019, Swoboda released his memoir titled Here's the Catch: A Memoir of the Miracle Mets and More (Thomas Dunne Books).

Swoboda met his wife, Cecilia, at the University of Maryland. They were married on October 9, 1965, and had two sons, Ron, Jr. (September 13, 1966 – January 27, 2020) and Brian Christopher.

He is mentioned in the 1987 song "Steve and Edie" by Dramarama
