= Lou DiMuro =

American baseball umpire (1931-1982)

- Born: April 24, 1931; Brooklyn, New York, U.S.
- Died: June 7, 1982 (aged 51); Arlington, Texas, U.S.
- Occupation: MLB umpire
- Years active: 1963–1982
- Children: 5; including Mike and Ray

Louis John DiMuro (April 24, 1931 – June 7, 1982) was an American umpire in Major League Baseball who worked in the American League from 1963 until his death.

== Career ==
DiMuro was born in Brooklyn, New York, and attended Henry Snyder High School in Jersey City, New Jersey, where he played football, and then Jersey City Junior College. He served in the Air Force in West Germany, but a broken finger in the service ended his baseball playing career and he turned to umpiring, graduating from the Al Somers School and working in the Kentucky–Illinois–Tennessee League (1955), Northern League (1956), Eastern League (1957) and International League (1958–62). He joined the AL staff and immediately worked a full schedule as a rookie in 1963. He was selected to work the World Series in 1969 and 1976, the All-Star Game in 1965, 1967, 1972 and 1981, and the American League Championship Series in 1971, 1975 and 1978, serving as crew chief in 1978.

=== 1969 World Series ===
In Game 5 of the 1969 World Series, the New York Mets held a 3 games to 1 lead over the heavily favored Baltimore Orioles, and were looking to close the series at home in front of a raucous crowd at Shea Stadium. The Orioles, behind the pitching of ace Dave McNally, led 3–0 in the bottom of the sixth inning when a pitch from McNally was low and inside to Mets leadoff hitter Cleon Jones. DiMuro, the home plate umpire, called the pitch a ball, but New York manager Gil Hodges appealed the ruling, believing the pitch hit Jones.

Hodges showed the ball to DiMuro, and pointed out a speck of black shoe polish to DiMuro. DiMuro accepted Hodges' explanation, and awarded Jones first base. Baltimore manager Earl Weaver, who had been ejected from Game 4 by umpire Shag Crawford for arguing balls and strikes, immediately came out and vehemently protested DiMuro's decision, to no avail. (Earlier in the same game, Baltimore's Frank Robinson had been hit by a pitch on his hip, but DiMuro ruled that the ball had hit Robinson's bat and did not award him first base.) Donn Clendenon followed Jones by launching a two-run home run into the Baltimore bullpen in left field, pulling the Mets to within 3–2.

The Mets tied the game in the seventh on a leadoff home run by light-hitting shortstop Al Weis, and scored two runs in the eighth with the help of two Baltimore errors. Jones caught a fly ball from Davey Johnson for the game's final out and a 5–3 New York victory, setting off a wild celebration. Notably, DiMuro had been behind the plate barely two months earlier on August 13, 1969, when the Orioles' Jim Palmer pitched an 8–0 no-hitter against the Oakland Athletics.

=== Collision with Cliff Johnson ===
On May 30, 1979, in the 11th inning of a game in Milwaukee, DiMuro was involved in a major collision near home plate with baserunner Cliff Johnson. The crash rendered DiMuro semiconscious and left him with an ailing hip for the remainder of his career. DiMuro missed the remainder of the season. He then slipped on dugout steps shortly after his return in 1980. Fellow crew member Larry Barnett would later remark, "He was one of the most decent human beings you'd ever meet, but he always seemed to have bad luck. If someone's bag would get lost, it would be his; if someone came down with the flu bug, it would be him."

=== Outside chest protector ===
In 1978, DiMuro switched from the outside chest protector, which had been favored by American League umpires since the turn of the century, to the inside chest protector, which was used by the National League since its invention by Hall of Fame arbiter Bill Klem (except by Hall of Famer Jocko Conlan and Beans Reardon). The previous season, American League supervisor of umpires Dick Butler ruled new hires had to use the inside chest protector. Two umpires hired in 1976, Al Clark and Greg Kosc, began their AL careers with the inside protector, and Durwood Merrill, Steve Palermo and Mike Reilly followed suit in 1977.

Of the remaining outside protector holdovers, Bill Haller retired after working the 1982 World Series, Marty Springstead and Terry Cooney switched to the inside protector after the 1982 season, Dale Ford switched back to the inside protector after the 1982 season (he had used the inside protector in 1981), and George Maloney and Russ Goetz retired after the 1983 season. Bill Kunkel died of cancer in May 1985, leaving Jerry Neudecker as the last one, and he retired after the 1985 season. The last active umpire who had once used the balloon protector, Joe Brinkman, switched to the inside protector in 1980.

== Death ==
After a June 6, 1982, game between the Chicago White Sox and Texas Rangers at Arlington Stadium, DiMuro ate dinner with Rangers coach Darrell Johnson. Walking back to his hotel at about 11 PM, he was struck by a motorist while attempting to cross a busy street. He died about two hours later at Arlington Memorial Hospital of massive head injuries that resulted from striking his head on the car's windshield. No charges were filed against the driver. According to Durwood Merrill, doctors said nothing could have been done to save DiMuro's life.

Merrill and crew members Larry Barnett and Mike Reilly were too upset to pack DiMuro's belongings in his hotel room afterward. That task fell to Al Clark, who was part of the incoming crew working the Ranger series against the Seattle Mariners. DiMuro was buried in East Lawn Cemetery in Tucson, Arizona, where he had lived since 1976 after previously residing in Floral Park, New York, and Westfield, New York.

Rocky Roe was named to the American League staff as DiMuro's full-time replacement, joining Barnett, Merrill and Reilly for a series in Milwaukee between the Brewers and Baltimore Orioles.

== Family ==
DiMuro's five children included sons Mike and Ray, who also went on to umpire in the major leagues; Mike was a major league umpire from 1999 until his retirement in July 2019; and Ray worked occasionally as a substitute umpire in the AL from 1996 to 1999. Mike began wearing number 16 to honor his father in 2000; the number had previously been retired by AL umpires since Lou's death.

== See also ==
- List of Major League Baseball umpires (disambiguation)
