= 1969 World Series =

66th edition of Major League Baseball's championship series

Team (Wins)	Managers	Season
New York Mets (4)	Gil Hodges	100–62, .617, GA: 8
Baltimore Orioles (1)	Earl Weaver	109–53, .673, GA: 19
- Dates: October 11–16
- Venue(s): Memorial Stadium (Baltimore); Shea Stadium (New York)
- MVP: Donn Clendenon (New York)
- Umpires: Hank Soar (AL), Frank Secory (NL), Larry Napp (AL), Shag Crawford (NL), Lou DiMuro (AL), Lee Weyer (NL)
- Hall of Famers: Mets: Gil Hodges (manager); Yogi Berra (coach); Whitey Herzog (Director of Player Development); Tom Seaver; Nolan Ryan; Orioles: Earl Weaver (manager); Jim Palmer; Brooks Robinson; Frank Robinson

Broadcast
- Television: NBC
- TV announcers: Curt Gowdy; Bill O'Donnell (in Baltimore); Lindsey Nelson (in New York)
- Radio: NBC
- Radio announcers: Jim Simpson; Ralph Kiner (in Baltimore); Bill O'Donnell (in New York)
- ALCS: Baltimore Orioles over Minnesota Twins (3–0)
- NLCS: New York Mets over Atlanta Braves (3–0)

The 1969 World Series was the championship series of Major League Baseball's (MLB) 1969 season. The 66th edition of the World Series, it was a best-of-seven playoff between the American League (AL) champion Baltimore Orioles and the National League (NL) champion New York Mets. The Mets won the series, four games to one, to accomplish one of the greatest upsets in Series history, as that particular Orioles team was considered to be one of the finest ever. The World Series win earned the team the sobriquet "The Miracle Mets". This was the first World Series of MLB's divisional era.

The Mets became the first expansion team to win a division title, a pennant, and the World Series, winning in their eighth year of existence, and for decades remained the fastest expansion team to win a World Series up to that point. Two teams eventually surpassed the latter record, as the Florida Marlins won the 1997 World Series in their fifth year (also becoming the first wild card team to win a World Series) and the Arizona Diamondbacks won the 2001 World Series in their fourth year of play. The 1969 World Series was the first World Series since 1954 to have games played in New York that did not involve the New York Yankees. It was also the first World Series in which neither the New York Giants nor Brooklyn Dodgers (as both teams had moved to California in 1958) represented New York from the NL; all subsequent World Series with a New York-area NL team participating have involved the Mets, who have been the only NL baseball team located in New York City since that era.

== Route to the World Series ==
This was the fourth meeting between teams from Baltimore and New York City for a major professional sports championship, which previously occurred in the 1958 and 1959 NFL Championship Games, and Super Bowl III earlier in the year (in which the New York Jets famously upset the Baltimore Colts).

=== New York Mets ===
The New York Mets, who had never finished higher than ninth place (next-to-last) nor won more than 73 games in a season since joining the National League in 1962, were not highly regarded before the 1969 season started. In fact, the best that could be said for them was that because the National League was being split into two divisions that year (as was the American League), the Mets were guaranteed to finish no lower than sixth place. The fact that the Mets began the season by losing 11–10 to the then-expansion Montreal Expos seemed to confirm this.

With three weeks to go in the season, the underdog Mets stormed past the Chicago Cubs, who had led the Eastern Division for most of the season, winning 38 of their final 49 games for a total of 100 wins and becoming the first National League Eastern Division champions, qualifying for the inaugural MLB Postseason field. Third-year pitcher Tom Seaver won a major-league-leading 25 games en route to his first Cy Young Award; the other two top Mets starting pitchers, Jerry Koosman and rookie Gary Gentry, combined to win 30 more games. Outfielder Cleon Jones hit a (then) club-record .340 and finished third in the National League batting race, while his lifelong friend and outfield mate Tommie Agee hit 26 home runs and drove in 76 runs to lead the club; they were the only players on the team who garnered more than 400 at bats. Manager Gil Hodges also employed a platoon system like the Yankees of the Casey Stengel era, in which Ron Swoboda and Art Shamsky became a switch-hitting right fielder who hit 23 home runs and drove in 100 runs, and Ed Kranepool and Donn Clendenon added up to a switch-hitting first baseman who hit 23 more homers and knocked in another 95 runs.

In the first League Championship Series, the normally light-hitting Mets, once again considered underdogs despite having a better regular-season record than their opponent, put on a power display by scoring 27 runs in sweeping the favored Atlanta Braves in three games.

=== Baltimore Orioles ===
The Baltimore Orioles, by contrast, were practically flawless and featured stars at almost every position. They breezed through the 1969 season, winning 109 games (the most games won since the 1961 Yankees) and became the first American League Eastern Division champions by 19 games, qualifying for the inaugural postseason field. They then brushed aside the Minnesota Twins in a sweep in the ALCS to win their second pennant in four years. The Orioles were led by star sluggers Frank Robinson and Boog Powell, who each hit over 30 home runs and drove in over 100 runs; third baseman Brooks Robinson, perhaps the best-fielding hot-corner player in baseball history; and pitchers Mike Cuellar, Dave McNally, and Jim Palmer, who combined for 63 victories.

== Summary ==
NL New York Mets (4) vs. AL Baltimore Orioles (1)

Game	Date	Score	Location	Time	Attendance
1	October 11	New York Mets – 1, Baltimore Orioles – 4	Memorial Stadium	2:13	50,429
2	October 12	New York Mets – 2, Baltimore Orioles – 1	Memorial Stadium	2:20	50,850
3	October 14	Baltimore Orioles – 0, New York Mets – 5	Shea Stadium	2:23	56,335
4	October 15	Baltimore Orioles – 1, New York Mets – 2 (10)	Shea Stadium	2:33	57,367
5	October 16	Baltimore Orioles – 3, New York Mets – 5	Shea Stadium	2:14	57,397

== Matchups ==
=== Game 1 ===
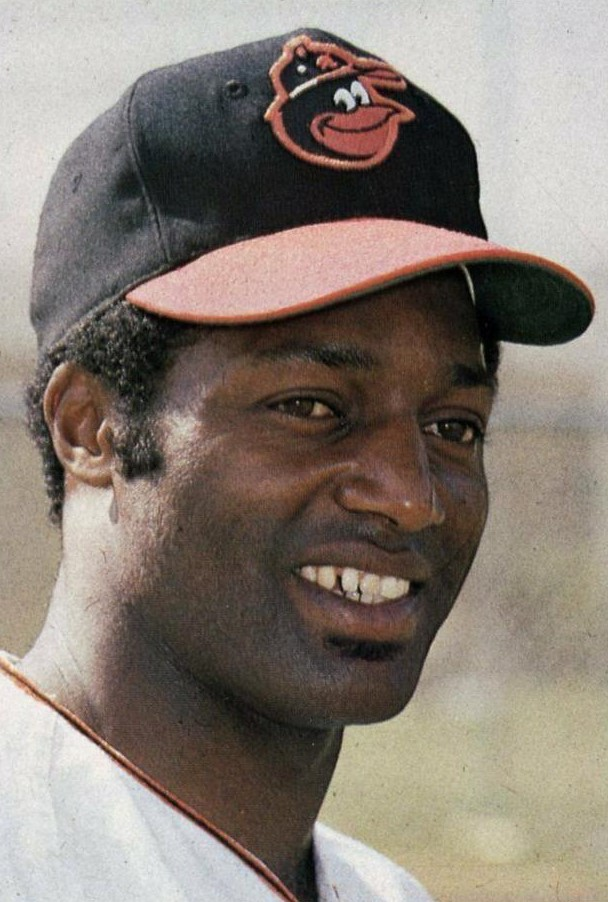
Don Buford

Saturday, October 11, 1969 1:00 pm (ET) at Memorial Stadium in Baltimore, Maryland
Team	1	2	3	4	5	6	7	8	9	R	H	E
New York	0	0	0	0	0	0	1	0	0	1	6	1
Baltimore	1	0	0	3	0	0	0	0	X	4	6	0
WP: Mike Cuellar (1–0) LP: Tom Seaver (0–1); Home runs: NYM: None; BAL: Don Buford (1)

With this win, the Orioles looked to be proving all the prognosticators right, as it was a dominant performance. Don Buford hit Tom Seaver's second pitch of the game for a home run, which just evaded Ron Swoboda's leaping attempt at catching it. The O's then added three more runs in the fourth when, with two outs, Elrod Hendricks singled and Davey Johnson walked. Mark Belanger then singled in a run, followed by an RBI single by pitcher Mike Cuellar. Buford capped the inning off by doubling in Belanger.

The Mets got their run in the seventh on a sacrifice fly by Al Weis. Orioles starter Mike Cuellar was the winner, allowing just that run in a complete-game effort.

Despite the opening-game loss, nobody on the Mets was discouraged. Tom Seaver – the game's losing pitcher – said years later "I swear, we came into the clubhouse more confident than when we had left it. Somebody – I think it was Clendenon – yelled out, 'Dammit, we can beat these guys!' And we believed it. A team knows if they've been badly beaten or outplayed. And we felt we hadn't been. The feeling wasn't that we had lost, but Hey, we nearly won that game! We hadn't been more than a hit or two from turning it around. It hit us like a ton of bricks."

=== Game 2 ===
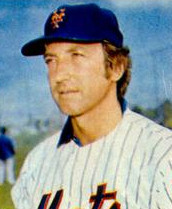
Jerry Koosman

Sunday, October 12, 1969 2:00 pm (ET) at Memorial Stadium in Baltimore, Maryland
Team	1	2	3	4	5	6	7	8	9	R	H	E
New York	0	0	0	1	0	0	0	0	1	2	6	0
Baltimore	0	0	0	0	0	0	1	0	0	1	2	0
WP: Jerry Koosman (1–0) LP: Dave McNally (0–1) Sv: Ron Taylor (1); Home runs: NYM: Donn Clendenon (1); BAL: None

Mets pitcher Jerry Koosman pitched six innings of no-hit ball, trying to match Don Larsen's World Series no-hit feat. Donn Clendenon provided him a slim lead with a home run in the fourth inning.

However, Koosman lost the no-hitter and the lead in the seventh inning as Paul Blair singled, stole second, and scored on a single by Brooks Robinson. But that was it for the Orioles' offense. The Mets pushed across a run in the top of the ninth on back-to-back-to-back singles by Ed Charles, Jerry Grote, and Al Weis, the latter scoring Charles. This proved to be the decisive run, and Orioles starter Dave McNally took the loss.

Koosman had trouble finishing the game, as he issued two-out walks in the bottom of the ninth to Frank Robinson and Boog Powell. Ron Taylor came on to retire Brooks Robinson for the final out and earn the save.

=== Game 3 ===
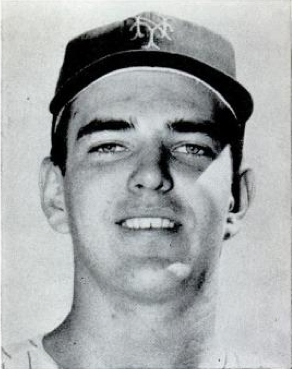
Ed Kranepool

Tuesday, October 14, 1969 1:00 pm (ET) at Shea Stadium in Queens, New York
Team	1	2	3	4	5	6	7	8	9	R	H	E
Baltimore	0	0	0	0	0	0	0	0	0	0	4	1
New York	1	2	0	0	0	1	0	1	X	5	6	0
WP: Gary Gentry (1–0) LP: Jim Palmer (0–1) Sv: Nolan Ryan (1); Home runs: BAL: None; NYM: Tommie Agee (1), Ed Kranepool

Agee led off the game for the Mets with a home run off Jim Palmer, then saved at least five runs with his defense. With two out in the fourth and Oriole runners on first and third, Agee raced to the 396-foot (121 m) sign in left-center and made a backhanded running catch of a drive hit by Elrod Hendricks. In the seventh, the Orioles had the bases loaded with two out, but Agee made a diving grab of a line drive hit by Paul Blair in right-center.

Ed Kranepool added a home run and Jerry Grote an RBI double for the Mets, while Gary Gentry pitched 6 2/3 shutout innings and helped his own cause with a second inning two-run double. Nolan Ryan, making the only World Series appearance of his Hall of Fame 27-year career, pitched the final 2 1/3 innings (benefiting from Agee's second catch) and earned a save.

=== Game 4 ===
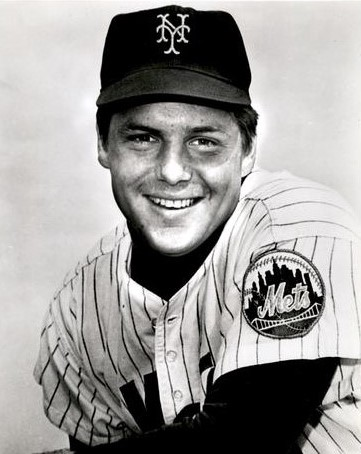
Tom Seaver

Wednesday, October 15, 1969 1:00 pm (ET) at Shea Stadium in Queens, New York
Team	1	2	3	4	5	6	7	8	9	10	R	H	E
Baltimore	0	0	0	0	0	0	0	0	1	0	1	6	1
New York	0	1	0	0	0	0	0	0	0	1	2	10	1
WP: Tom Seaver (1–1) LP: Dick Hall (0–1); Home runs: BAL: None; NYM: Donn Clendenon (2)

Game 4 was mired in controversy. Tom Seaver's photograph was used on some anti-war Moratorium Day literature being distributed outside Shea Stadium before the game, although the pitcher stated that his picture was used without his knowledge or approval. A further controversy that day involved the flying of the American flag at Shea Stadium. New York City Mayor John Lindsay had ordered flags flown at half staff to observe the Moratorium Day and honor those who had died in Vietnam. Many were concerned, including 225 wounded servicemen who were attending the game, and Baseball Commissioner Bowie Kuhn announced that the American flag would be flown at full staff at Shea for Game 4.

Tom Seaver atoned for his Game 1 ineffectiveness by shutting out the Orioles through eight innings. Once again, Donn Clendenon provided the lead with a homer in the second off Game 1 winner Mike Cuellar, who allowed just that run over seven solid innings. In the third inning, after arguing ball-strike calls too strenuously with plate umpire Shag Crawford, Earl Weaver of the Orioles became the first manager since 1935 to be ejected from a World Series game. At the start of the argument, NBC's microphones picked up Crawford screaming at Weaver, "You shut your goddamn mouth!"

In the top of the ninth, Seaver ran into trouble. Frank Robinson and Boog Powell hit back-to-back one-out singles to put runners on first and third. Brooks Robinson then hit a sinking line drive towards right that Mets right fielder Ron Swoboda dove for and caught just inches off the ground. Frank Robinson tagged and scored, but Swoboda's heroics kept the Orioles from possibly taking the lead. Elrod Hendricks then flied out to Swoboda to end the inning.

In the bottom of the tenth, Jerry Grote led off by blooping a double to left. Al Weis was intentionally walked to set up a force play and get to the pitcher's spot in the lineup. Mets manager Gil Hodges sent J. C. Martin up to hit for Seaver. Martin laid down a sacrifice bunt, but Orioles reliever Pete Richert hit Martin in the wrist with his throw to first, and the ball went down the right field line. Rod Gaspar, running for Grote, came around to score the winning run.

Replays showed Martin running inside the first-base line, which appeared to hinder Richert's ability to make a good throw and Orioles second baseman Davey Johnson from catching it. Subsequent controversy focused on MLB rule 6.05 (k), which says that a batter shall be out—with the ball dead and the runners returned to their original bases—if "...In running the last half of the distance from home base to first base, while the ball is being fielded to first base, he runs outside (to the right of) the three-foot line, or inside (to the left of) the foul line, and in the umpire's judgment in so doing interferes with the fielder taking the throw at first base."

The umpires' judgment was that Martin did not interfere.

=== Game 5 ===
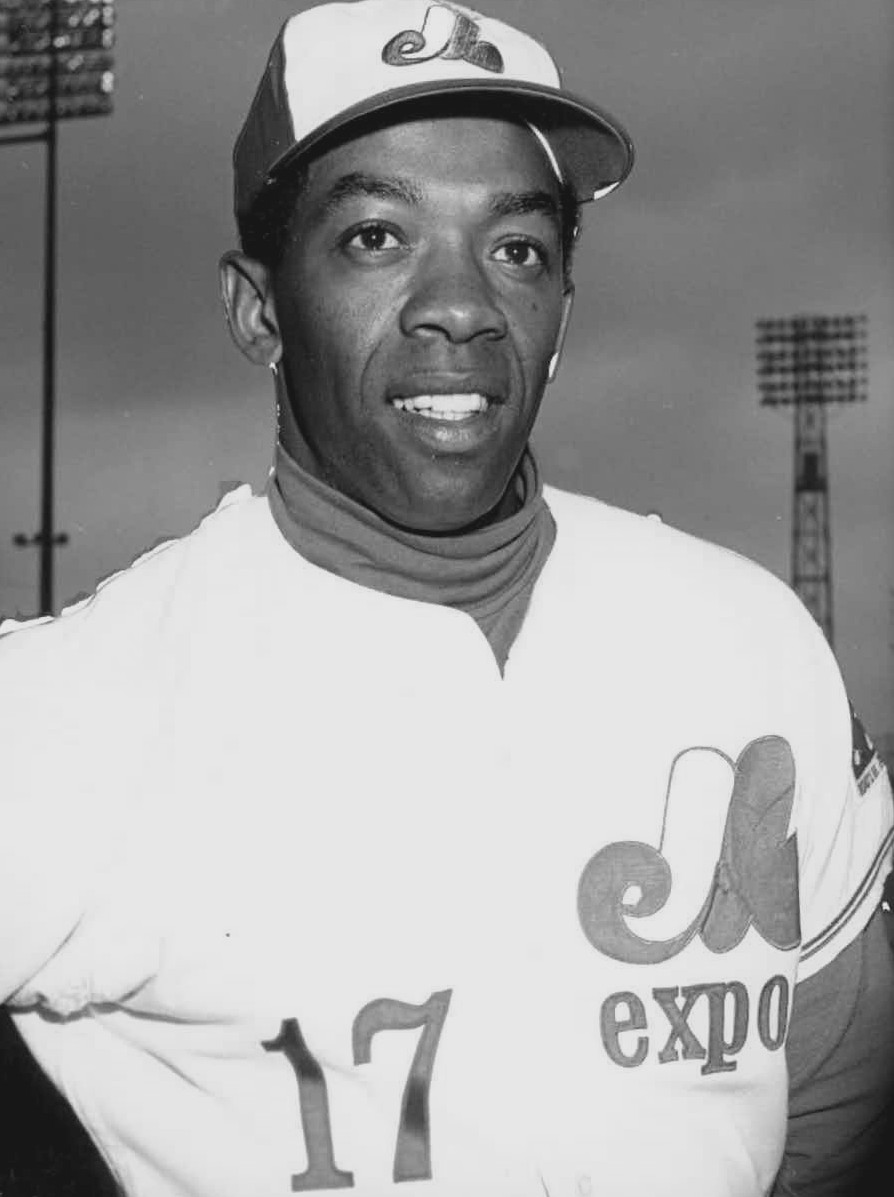
Donn Clendenon

Thursday, October 16, 1969 1:00 pm (ET) at Shea Stadium in Queens, New York
Team	1	2	3	4	5	6	7	8	9	R	H	E
Baltimore	0	0	3	0	0	0	0	0	0	3	5	2
New York	0	0	0	0	0	2	1	2	X	5	7	0
WP: Jerry Koosman (2–0) LP: Eddie Watt (0–1); Home runs: BAL: Dave McNally (1), Frank Robinson (1); NYM: Donn Clendenon (3), Al Weis (1)

Dave McNally shut out the Mets through five innings and helped himself with a two-run homer in the third inning, following a Mark Belanger single, off game 2 winner Jerry Koosman. Frank Robinson homered off Koosman two batters later in the inning as well, and the Orioles looked to be cruising with a 3–0 lead.

The Mets, however, benefited from two questionable umpire's calls. In the top of the sixth inning, Mets starter Koosman appeared to have hit Frank Robinson with a pitch, but plate umpire Lou DiMuro ruled that the pitch hit his bat before hitting him and denied him first base. Replays showed, however, that Robinson was indeed hit first — the ball struck him on the hip, then bounced up and hit his bat.

In the bottom of the sixth, McNally bounced a pitch that appeared to have hit Mets left fielder Cleon Jones on the foot, then bounced into the Mets' dugout. McNally and the Orioles claimed the ball hit the dirt and not Jones, but Mets manager Gil Hodges showed the ball to DiMuro, who found a spot of shoe polish on the ball and awarded Jones first base. McNally then gave up Series MVP Donn Clendenon's third homer of the series (a record for a five-game World Series that was tied by the Phillies' Ryan Howard in the 2008 Classic and by Boston’s Steve Pearce in the 2018 Series, but then broken by Freddie Freeman in 2024) to cut the lead to 3–2.

However, the "shoe polish" incident may not be such a simple, straightforward matter. On August 22, 2009, at the 40th-anniversary celebration of the Mets' 1969 Championship, held at their new stadium, Citi Field, Jerry Koosman stated in several media interviews that, in actuality, Hodges had instructed him to rub the ball on his shoe, which he did, and after that Hodges showed the ball to the umpire. Koosman's claim does not necessarily mean that the ball did not strike Jones on the foot, nor does it even mean that the polish on the ball seen by the umpire was put there by Koosman – it is certainly conceivable that there was already a genuine spot of polish on the ball, which easily could have escaped Koosman's notice as he hastily created the fraudulent one. In any case, Koosman's allegation at the very least adds an intriguing layer of uncertainty and possible chicanery to an already legendary event. Koosman was known for his sense of humor, and his love of practical jokes when he was an active player. Therefore, his claim of having scuffed the ball against his own shoe could be a ruse. Besides, there are other stories which have been told about that incident, by other players who were in the Mets dugout that day. One of those stories comes from Ron Swoboda, who said during an interview on the Mets 1986 25th Anniversary video, that when the ball came bounding into the Mets dugout, it hit an open ball bag under the bench, and several batting / infield practice balls came spilling out on the dugout floor. According to Swoboda, one could not distinguish the actual game ball from any of the ones that spilled out of the bag. Hodges quickly looked down, grabbed a ball that had a black streak on it, and walked it out to the home plate umpire, who then awarded first base to Jones. In any case, this incident provided baseball with yet another entertaining legend, about which the absolute truth will probably never be known.

The Mets then tied the score in the seventh on a home run by the unheralded and light-hitting Al Weis. Weis hit only seven home runs in his big league career; this was the only home run he hit at Shea Stadium and, in fact, was the only home run he hit playing for the home team in any major league park. Weis led all batters in the series with a .455 average.

The winning runs scored in the eighth as Game 4 defensive hero Ron Swoboda doubled in Jones with the go-ahead run. Swoboda then scored when Jerry Grote's grounder was mishandled by first baseman Boog Powell, whose throw to first was then dropped by pitcher Eddie Watt in an unusual double error. Jerry Koosman got the win, his second of the series. With two outs in the top of the ninth inning, Koosman faced Orioles second baseman Davey Johnson (who, coincidentally, later managed the Mets to their second World Series championship in 1986). After taking a pitch of two balls and one strike, Johnson hit a fly-ball out to left field which was caught by Cleon Jones. After a shaky third inning, Koosman settled down to retire 19 of the next 21 batters he faced, giving up a single and a walk.

Karl Ehrhardt, a Mets fan known as "the sign man" at Shea Stadium, held up a sign that read There Are No Words soon after the final out was made. The sign made an appearance in the Series highlight film. Immediately following the victory, thousands of fans rushed onto the field and the Mets were forced to retreat to their locker room. Bill Gleason, a sports columnist for the Chicago Sun-Times, alleged that this feat would not repeated again until Disco Demolition Night, an event which saw many people rush onto the playing field in Comiskey Park just before the second game of a doubleheader between the Chicago White Sox and Detroit Tigers was scheduled to begin on July 12, 1979.

In all four Mets victories, their starting first baseman hit a home run: Donn Clendenon in Games 2, 4 and 5, and Ed Kranepool in Game 3. The expression, "Good pitching defeats good hitting", was never more evident than in this World Series; Baltimore collected only 23 hits for a .146 batting average, both team lows for a 5-game series. After winning Game 1 in which the Orioles had only six hits, Baltimore only managed a .134 batting average (17-for-127) over the next four games. Boog Powell led the Orioles with five hits and a .263 average—but all were non-scoring singles (although one advanced Frank Robinson to third base to set up Swoboda's defensive heroics). Don Buford collected two hits in four at-bats in the opening game, including a lead-off home run against Tom Seaver, but went 0-for-16 over the next four games. Paul Blair went 2-for-20, Davey Johnson 1-for-16, Frank Robinson 3-for-16, Brooks Robinson 1-for-19, Mark Belanger 3-for-15, and Elrod Hendricks 1-for-10. The Orioles offense only managed four extra-base hits off Mets pitching in the five-game series, all in the first and last games. The Mets won despite below-average performances from Jerry Grote, who went 4-for-19, Tommie Agee, who went 3-for-18, Cleon Jones, who went 3-for-19, Bud Harrelson, who went 3-for-17 and Ed Charles, who went 2-for-15.

== Aftermath and legacy ==
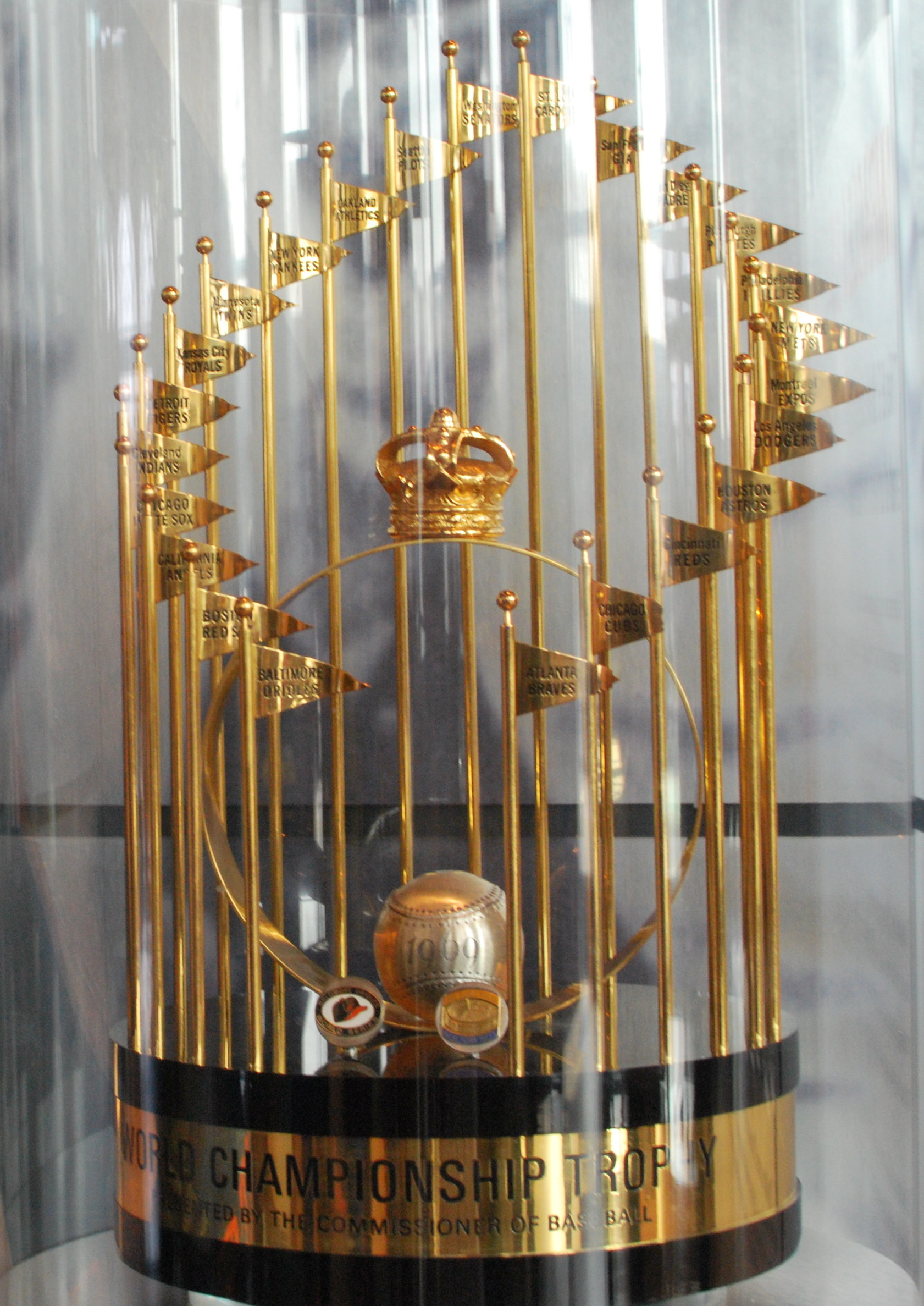
The 1969 Commissioner's Trophy on display at Citi Field in 2010

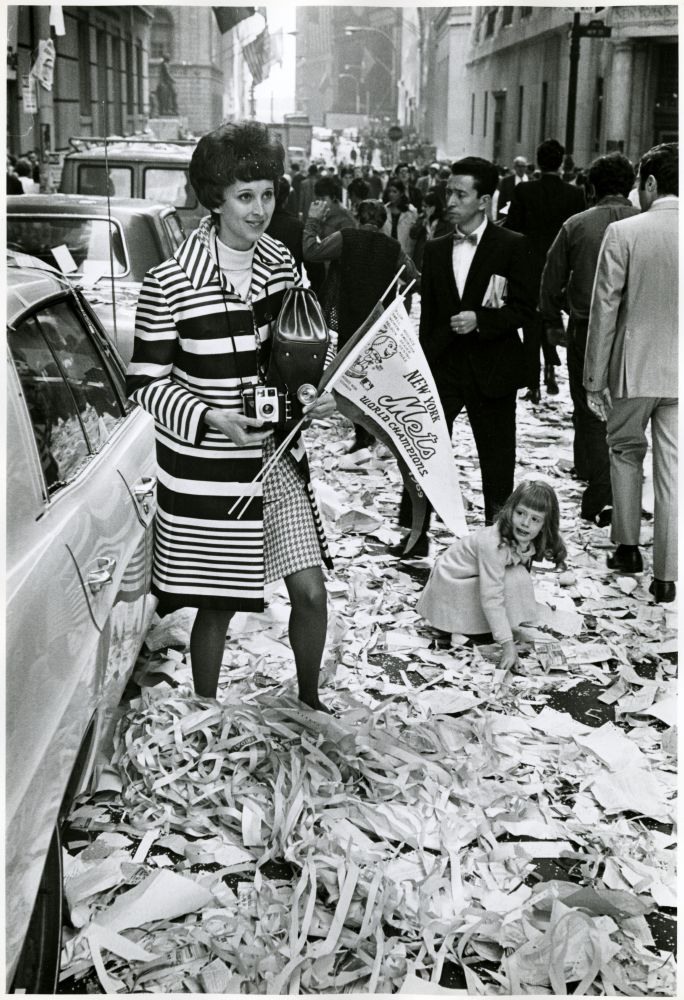
A New Yorker taking part in the World Series parade

The 1969 series was the second major upset by a New York team over a Baltimore team in a sport's championship event in 1969. Earlier in January, the Jets, led by Joe Namath, upset the heavily favored Baltimore Colts in the Super Bowl, which also aired on NBC. Both the Jets and Mets called Shea Stadium home at the time. In addition, the New York Knicks eliminated the Baltimore Bullets from the 1969 NBA Playoffs; they also defeated the Bullets in 1970 en route to their first championship. As a result, New York became the first city to host a World Series and NBA championship within a year's span.

There are several direct connections between the two Mets World Championship teams of 1969 and 1986. Orioles second baseman Davey Johnson flied out to Cleon Jones for the last out of the 1969 World Series; Johnson later managed the 1986 Mets to their World Series title. The pitcher on the mound for the last out of the 1986 Series, Jesse Orosco, had been traded to the Mets for Jerry Koosman (the pitcher on the mound for the last out of the 1969 Series) after the 1978 season. 1969 Mets shortstop Bud Harrelson earned a second World Series ring as the club's third-base coach in 1986. However, Mets pitcher Tom Seaver was on the losing end in 1986, as a member of the Boston Red Sox (he did not appear in the 1986 World Series due to a knee injury). Also in 1986, the Mets' World Series championship was in conjunction with a Super Bowl win, this time by the New York Giants, who defeated the Denver Broncos, 39–20, to win Super Bowl XXI.

The Orioles repeated as AL East champs the next season, when they won 108 games, one fewer than the previous year. In the ALCS, they swept the Minnesota Twins for the second straight year to return to the World Series, this time, they were victorious in five games over the Cincinnati Reds.

Four years later, the Mets returned to the World Series despite an 82–79 record, but lost to the Oakland Athletics in seven games.

Orioles' second baseman Davey Johnson would later manage the Mets from 1984–1990, winning a World Series with the team in 1986. Johnson also manged the Orioles to back-to-back postseason appearances in 1996 and 1997. Johnson was later inducted into both the Mets and Orioles Hall of Fame.

== In popular culture ==
In a 1999 episode of Everybody Loves Raymond, Ray and his brother Robert travel to the National Baseball Hall of Fame to see a ceremony honoring the 1969 Mets. The episode ends with the brothers singing "Meet the Mets."

This series is a major plot point in the 2000 film Frequency, where John Sullivan (Jim Caviezel) discovers that he can communicate with his long-dead father 30 years in the past over a ham radio during the time when the Series is being played. He overcomes his father's skepticism that he is 30 years in the future by describing events in the upcoming games, including the Shoe Polish incident with Jones.

It is also a plot point in the 2012 movie Men in Black 3, which depicts the last out of Game 5. The clairvoyant alien character Griffin (played by Michael Stuhlbarg) asserts, among other things, that the baseball pitched by Jerry Koosman was "aerodynamically flawed" because the horsehide tanner's wife had left him, that Davey Johnson only became a baseball player because his father "couldn't find a football to give him for his eighth birthday," and that Cleon Jones would have been born a woman had his parents not had "an extra glass of wine before going to bed."

In a Batman '66 story that crosses over with the Legion of Super-Heroes, Egghead goes to the future and refuses to trust the future museums because they say the Mets win the 1969 World Series.

== Composite box ==
1969 World Series (4–1): New York Mets (N.L.) over Baltimore Orioles (A.L.)

Team	1	2	3	4	5	6	7	8	9	10	R	H	E
New York Mets	1	3	0	1	0	3	2	3	1	1	15	35	2
Baltimore Orioles	1	0	3	3	0	0	1	0	1	0	9	23	4
Total attendance: 272,378 Average attendance: 54,476; Winning player's share: $18,338 Losing player's share: $14,904

== Broadcast coverage ==
NBC televised the Series, with Curt Gowdy sharing play-by-play commentary with Orioles announcer Bill O'Donnell (for the games in Baltimore) and Mets announcer Lindsey Nelson (for the games in New York). Tony Kubek served as field reporter and in-stands interviewer. Jim Simpson hosted pre-game coverage along with Sandy Koufax and Mickey Mantle. NBC Radio also broadcast the games, with Simpson splitting play-by-play with Mets announcer Ralph Kiner (for the games in Baltimore) and O'Donnell (for the games in New York).

NBC's telecasts of Games 1 and 2 have since been preserved on kinescope by the CBC. Meanwhile, Games 3–5 exist in their original color videotape quality from "truck feeds", including the pre-game coverage with Simpson, Koufax and Mantle.

== Quotes ==
There's a drive into deep left-center, racing hard is Agee... WHAT A GRAB!!! Tom Agee!

— Curt Gowdy calling Tommie Agee's catch off Elrod Hendricks in the 4th inning of game 3

== See also ==
- 1969 Japan Series
