= Gil Hodges =

American baseball player and manager (1924–1972)

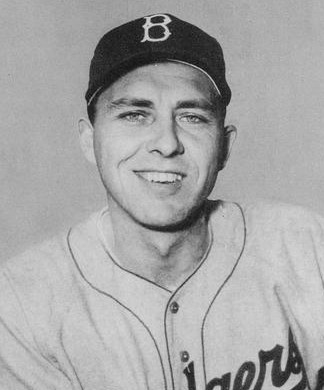
- Hodges with the Brooklyn Dodgers in 1954
- First baseman / Manager
- Born: April 4, 1924; Princeton, Indiana, U.S.
- Died: April 2, 1972 (aged 47); West Palm Beach, Florida, U.S.
- Batted: Right Threw: Right

MLB debut
- October 3, 1943, for the Brooklyn Dodgers

Last MLB appearance
- May 5, 1963, for the New York Mets

MLB statistics
- Batting average: .273
- Home runs: 370
- Runs batted in: 1,274
- Managerial record: 650–753
- Winning %: .463
- Stats at Baseball Reference
- Managerial record at Baseball Reference

Teams
- As player: Brooklyn / Los Angeles Dodgers (1943, 1947–1961); New York Mets (1962–1963); As manager: Washington Senators (1963–1967); New York Mets (1968–1971)

Career highlights and awards
- 8× All-Star (1949–1955, 1957); 3× World Series champion (1955, 1959, 1969); 3× Gold Glove Award (1957–1959); Hit four home runs in one game on August 31, 1950; Los Angeles Dodgers No. 14 retired; New York Mets No. 14 retired; New York Mets Hall of Fame

Member of the National

Baseball Hall of Fame
- Induction: 2022
- Vote: 75%
- Election method: Golden Days Committee

Gilbert Raymond Hodges (born Hodge; April 4, 1924 – April 2, 1972) was an American first baseman and manager in Major League Baseball (MLB) who played most of his 18-year career for the Brooklyn / Los Angeles Dodgers. An eight-time All-Star, he anchored the infield for the Dodgers through six pennant winners and two World Series titles before leading the New York Mets to their first World Series title in 1969. One of the most beloved and admired players in major league history, Hodges was inducted into the Baseball Hall of Fame in 2022, fifty years after his sudden death.

Born in Princeton, Indiana, Hodges was the son of a coal miner. He grew up in Petersburg, Indiana, where he was a four-sport athlete in high school, before attending Saint Joseph's College where he played baseball and basketball. He dropped out to sign with the Brooklyn Dodgers, making his MLB debut at age 19 before being joining the United States Marine Corps during World War II, receiving the Bronze Star Medal, with 'V' for VALOR device, after serving in combat as an anti-aircraft gunner during the battles of Tinian and Okinawa in the Pacific Theatre. After being discharged, Hodges returned to the Dodgers' organization, making his way back to the majors in 1947.

During his time with the Brooklyn Dodgers, Hodges was a core member of the "Boys of Summer", along with Jackie Robinson, Roy Campanella, Duke Snider, and Pee Wee Reese. He was widely regarded as the major leagues' outstanding first baseman in the 1950s, with Snider being the only player to have more home runs or runs batted in during the decade. Hodges held the National League (NL) record for career home runs by a right-handed hitter from 1960 to 1963, with his final total of 370 briefly ranking tenth in major league history; he held the NL record for career grand slams from 1957 to 1974. A sterling defensive player, Hodges won the first three Gold Glove Awards ever awarded, for his position. The first was MLB-wide; not just for the NL. He led the NL in double plays four times and in putouts, assists and fielding percentage three times each. He ranked second in NL history with 1,281 assists and 1,614 double plays when his career ended, and was among the league's career leaders in games (6th, 1,908) and total chances (10th, 16,751) at first base.

After retiring as a player during the 1963 season, Hodges became the manager of the expansion Washington Senators. He did not have a winning season there, although the team did improve upon their win total each year during Hodges's 5-year tenure. Before the 1968 season, the New York Mets hired Hodges as manager. The following season, in what is considered one of the greatest championship runs in sports history, he led the team to their first winning season and World Series title. A heavy smoker, Hodges died suddenly from a heart attack two days before his 48th birthday, during spring training in 1972. The Mets retired his number, 14, the following season; 49 years later, during the 2022 season, the Dodgers, Hodges's long-time team, followed suit after his election to the Hall of Fame.

== Early years ==
Hodges was born Gilbert Raymond Hodge on April 4, 1924, in Princeton, Indiana, the son of Charles P. Hodge, a coal miner, and his wife Irene (née Horstmeyer). He had an older brother, Robert, and a younger sister, Marjorie. At some point, prior to 1930, the family name was changed from 'Hodge' to 'Hodges'.

When Hodges was seven, the family moved to nearby Petersburg. He was a star four-sport athlete at Petersburg High School, earning a combined seven varsity letters in football, baseball, basketball and track. Hodges declined a 1941 contract offer from the Detroit Tigers, instead attending Saint Joseph's College with the hope of eventually becoming a collegiate coach. Hodges spent two years at St Joseph's, competing in baseball and basketball. He dropped out after his sophomore year, accepting a contract from Stanley Feezle, a sporting goods storeowner and part-time scout, to sign with the Brooklyn Dodgers. He was first assigned to a Class D minor-league team, but did not appear in a game for them.

Aged 19, Hodges was called up by the Dodgers and made his debut on October 3, 1943, against the Cincinnati Reds, the last game of the 1943 season. Playing third base, he went 0-for-2 with two strikeouts and made two errors. A few days later, he entered the United States Marine Corps to serve in World War II.

=== Military service ===
Hodges entered the United States Marine Corps during World War II after having participated in its Reserve Officers' Training Corps program at Saint Joseph's. He served in combat as an anti-aircraft gunner in the 16th Anti-Aircraft Artillery Battalion, participating in the battles of Tinian and Okinawa, and received a Bronze Star Medal with Combat "V" for heroism under fire.

Following the war, Hodges also spent time completing course work at Oakland City University, near his hometown, playing basketball for the Mighty Oaks, joining the 1947–48 team after four games (1–3 record); they finished at 9–10. One of his teammates, Bob Lochmueller, would go on to star at the University of Louisville and play in the NBA.

After being discharged from the Marine Corps in 1946, Hodges returned to the Dodgers organization as a catcher with the Newport News Dodgers of the Piedmont League, batting .278 in 129 games as they won the league championship; his teammates included first baseman and future film and television star Chuck Connors.

== Playing career ==
=== The Boys of Summer ===
Hodges was called up to Brooklyn in 1947, the same year that Jackie Robinson broke baseball's color barrier. He played as a catcher, joining the team's nucleus of Robinson, Pee Wee Reese and Carl Furillo. Hodges's only appearance in the 1947 World Series against the New York Yankees was as a pinch hitter for pitcher Rex Barney in Game Seven, but he struck out. With the emergence of Roy Campanella behind the plate and Robinson's move to second base in 1948, manager Leo Durocher shifted Hodges to first base, and he batted .249 with 11 home runs and 70 runs batted in during his rookie season.

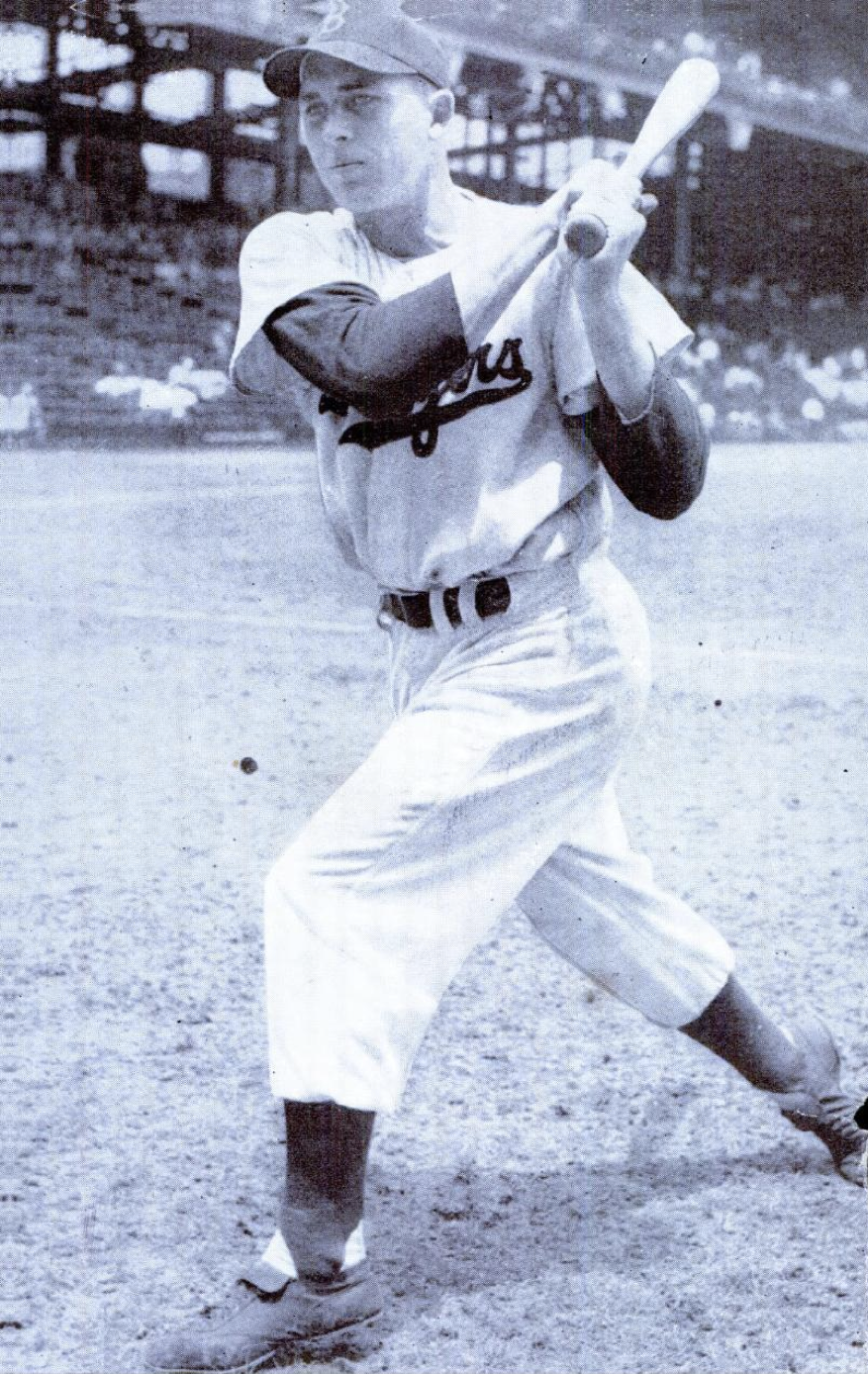
Hodges in 1949

On June 25, 1949, Hodges hit for the cycle on his way to his first of seven consecutive All-Star teams. For the season, his 115 runs batted in ranked fourth in the NL, and he tied Hack Wilson's 1932 club record for right-handed hitters with 23 home runs. Defensively, he led the NL in putouts (1,336), double plays (142) and fielding average (.995). Facing the Yankees again in the 1949 World Series, he batted only .235 but drove in the sole run in Brooklyn's only victory, a 1–0 triumph in Game 2. In Game 5, he hit a two-out, three-run homer in the seventh to pull the Dodgers within 10–6, but struck out to end the game and the Series.

On August 31, 1950, against the Boston Braves, Hodges joined Lou Gehrig as only the second player since 1900 to hit four home runs in a game without the benefit of extra innings; he hit them against four different pitchers, with the first coming off Warren Spahn. He also had seventeen total bases in the game, tied for third-most in Major League history. That year he also led the league in fielding (.994) and set an NL record with 159 double plays, breaking Frank McCormick's mark of 153 with the 1939 Cincinnati Reds He finished 1950 third in the league in both homers (32) and runs batted in (113), and came in eighth in the Most Valuable Player voting.

In 1951, he became the first member of the Dodgers to hit 40 home runs, breaking Babe Herman's 1930 mark of 35; Campanella hit 41 in 1953, but Hodges recaptured the record with 42 in 1954 before Snider eclipsed him again with 43 in 1956. His last home run of 1951 came on October 2 against the New York Giants, as the Dodgers tied the three-game NL playoff series at a game each with a 10–0 win; New York won the pennant the next day on Bobby Thomson's "Shot Heard 'Round the World". That year, Hodges broke his own record for most double plays with 171, a record which stood until Donn Clendenon had 182 for the 1966 Pittsburgh Pirates; he also led the NL with 126 assists, and was second in home runs, third in runs (118) and total bases (307), fifth in slugging percentage (.527), and sixth in runs batted in (103).

In 1952, with his last home run of the season, Hodges tied Dolph Camilli's Dodger team record of 139 home runs, surpassing him in 1953; Snider moved ahead of Hodges in 1956. That season, he again led the NL with 116 assists in the 1952 campaign and was third in the league in home runs (32) and fourth in runs batted in (102) and slugging (.500).

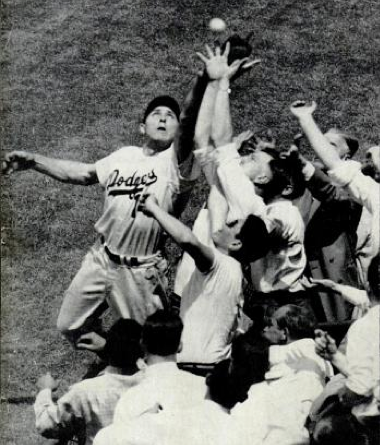
Hodges attempting to make a catch at Ebbets Field

Near the end of the 1952 season, Hodges suffered through one of the most famous slumps in baseball history: after going hitless in his last four regular-season games of 1952, he also went hitless in all seven games of the 1952 World Series against the Yankees (finishing the Series 0-for-21 at the plate), with Brooklyn losing to the Yankees in the seven games. Hodges was also involved in a blown call in Game 5. Johnny Sain was batting for the Yankees in the 10th inning of Game 5 and grounded out, as ruled by first base umpire Art Passarella. The photograph of the play, however, shows Sain stepping on first base while Hodges, also with a foot on the bag, is reaching for the ball that is about a foot shy of entering his glove. Baseball commissioner Ford Frick, an ex-newspaperman himself, refused to defend Passarella.

When Hodges's slump continued into the 1953 season, fans reacted with countless letters and good-luck gifts. One Brooklyn priest, Father Herbert Redmond of St. Francis Roman Catholic Church, told his flock: "It's too hot for a sermon today. Go home, keep the commandments, and say a prayer for Gil Hodges." Hodges began hitting again soon afterward, and rarely struggled again in the World Series. Teammate Carl Erskine, who described himself as a good Baptist, kidded him by saying, "Gil, you just about made a believer out of me."

Hodges ended 1953 with a .302 batting average, finishing fifth in the NL in runs batted in (122) and sixth in home runs (31). Against the Yankees in the 1953 Series, Hodges hit .364; he had three hits, including a homer in the 9–5 Game 1 loss. However, the Dodgers again lost in six games. In 1954, under their new manager Walter Alston, Hodges had the best year of his career with career-highs in batting average with .304, 176 hits, 130 runs batted in, and 42 home runs and again leading the NL in putouts (1,381) and assists (132). He also set a still-standing record with 19 sacrifice flies. He was second in the league to Ted Kluszewski in home runs and runs batted in (130), fifth in total bases (335), and sixth in slugging (.579) and runs (106), and placed tenth in the Most Valuable Player vote.

In the 1955 season, Hodges's regular-season production declined to a .289 average, 27 home runs and 102 runs batted in. Facing the Yankees in the World Series for the fifth time, he was 1-for-12 in the first three games before coming around. In Game 4, Hodges hit a two-run homer in the fourth inning to put Brooklyn ahead, 4–3, and later had a single that drove in a run as they held off the Yankees, 8–5; he also scored the first run in the Dodgers' 5–3 win in Game 5. In Game 7, he drove in Campanella with two out in the fourth inning for a 1–0 lead and added a sacrifice fly to score Reese with one out in the sixth inning. Johnny Podres scattered eight New York hits, and when Reese threw Elston Howard's grounder to Hodges for the final out, Brooklyn had a 2–0 win and their first World Series title in franchise history and their only championship in Brooklyn.

In 1956, Hodges recorded 32 home runs and 87 runs batted in. Brooklyn won the pennant again, and once more met the Yankees in the World Series, but ended up losing in seven games. In the third inning of Game 1, he hit a three-run homer to put Brooklyn ahead, 5–2, as they went on to a 6–3 win; he had three hits and four runs batted in during the 13–8 slugfest in Game 2, scoring to give the Dodgers a 7–6 lead in the third and doubling in two runs each in the fourth and fifth innings for an 11–7 lead. In Don Larsen's perfect game, Hodges struck out, flied to center, and lined to third base, as Brooklyn went on to lose in seven games.

In 1957, Hodges set the NL record for career grand slams, breaking the mark of 12 shared by Rogers Hornsby and Ralph Kiner; his final total of 14 was tied by Hank Aaron and Willie McCovey in 1972, and broken by Aaron in 1974. He finished seventh in the NL with a .299 batting average and fifth with 98 runs batted in, and leading the league with 1,317 putouts. He was also among the NL's top ten players in home runs (27), hits (173), runs (94), triples (7), slugging (.511) and total bases (296); in late September, he drove in the last Dodgers run at Ebbets Field, and the last run in Brooklyn history. Hodges was named to his last All-Star team and placed seventh in the Most Valuable Player balloting, the highest position in his career.

=== Move to Los Angeles ===
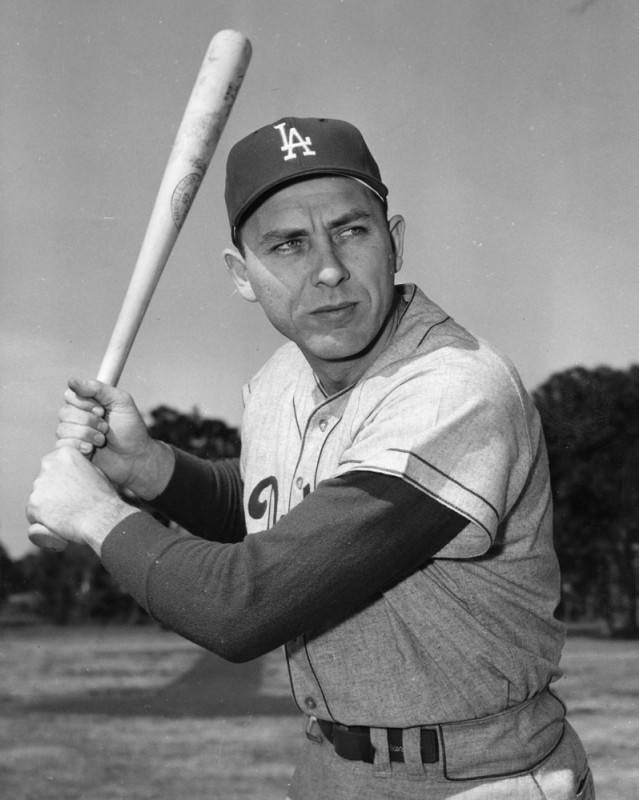
Hodges with the Los Angeles Dodgers in 1958

Prior to the 1958 season, the Dodgers and their cross-town rivals the Giants relocated to Los Angeles and San Francisco respectively. On April 23, 1958, Hodges became the seventh player to hit 300 home runs in the NL, connecting off Dick Drott of the Chicago Cubs. That year he also tied a post-1900 record by leading the league in double plays (134) for the fourth time, equaling Frank McCormick and Ted Kluszewski; Donn Clendenon eventually broke the record in 1968. Hodges's totals were 22 home runs and 64 runs batted in as the Dodgers finished in seventh place in their first season in California. He also broke Dolph Camilli's NL record of 923 career strikeouts in 1958.

In 1959, the Dodgers captured their first pennant in Los Angeles, with Hodges contributing 25 home runs, 80 runs batted in, and a batting average of .276, coming in seventh in the league with a .513 slugging mark; he also led the NL with a .992 fielding average. He batted .391 in the 1959 World Series against the Chicago White Sox (his first against a team other than the Yankees), with his solo home run in the eighth inning of Game 4 giving the Dodgers a 5–4 win, as they triumphed in six games for another Series championship.

In 1960, Hodges broke Ralph Kiner's NL record for right-handed hitters of 351 career home runs, and appeared on the TV program Home Run Derby. In his last season with the Dodgers in 1961, he became the team's career runs batted in leader with 1,254, passing Zack Wheat; Snider moved ahead of him the following year. Hodges received the first three Rawlings Gold Glove Awards, from 1957 to 1959.

During spring training 1961, Hodges gave what was one of his biggest contributions to the Dodgers. Manager Walter Alston had appointed him acting manager for a B-squad game, against the Minnesota Twins in Orlando, Florida. Upon discovering that one of their pitchers, Ed Palmquist, had missed the flight, Hodges told that day's starter, Sandy Koufax that he would have to pitch seven innings instead of the previously planned five. The game ended up becoming a turning point in Koufax's career; after struggling with his control to start the game, he ended up pitching seven no-hit innings; Koufax went on to have a strong spring training and a breakthrough season in 1961. Hodges himself was unable to manage the game, however, since he had been beaned during batting practice.

=== Return to New York ===
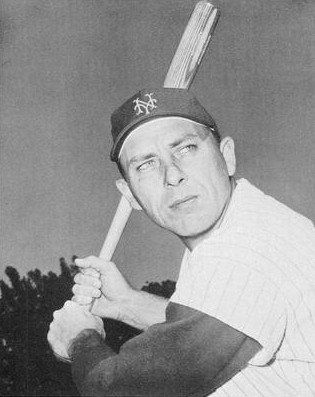
Hodges with the New York Mets in 1963

After being chosen in the 1961 MLB Expansion Draft, Hodges was one of the original 1962 Mets and, despite knee problems, was persuaded to continue his playing career in New York, hitting the first home run in franchise history. By the end of the year, in which he played only 54 games, he ranked tenth in MLB history with 370 home runs – second to only Jimmie Foxx among right-handed hitters. He also held the National League (NL) record for career home runs by a right-handed hitter from 1960 to 1963, and held the NL record for career grand slams from 1957 to 1974.

After 11 games with the Mets in 1963, during which he batted .227 with no homers and was plagued by injuries, he was traded to the Washington Senators in late May so that he could replace Mickey Vernon as Washington's manager. Hodges immediately announced his retirement from playing in order to focus on his new position. His last game had been on May 5 in a doubleheader hosting the San Francisco Giants.

=== Career overall ===
An eight-time All-Star, Hodges batted .273 in his career with a .487 slugging percentage, 1,921 hits, 1,274 runs batted in, 1,105 runs, 370 home runs, 295 doubles and 63 stolen bases in 2,071 games. His 361 home runs with the Dodgers remain second in team history to Snider's 389. His 1,614 career double plays placed him behind only Charlie Grimm (1733) in NL history, and were a major league record for a right-handed fielding first baseman until Chris Chambliss surpassed him in 1984. His 1,281 career assists ranked second in league history to Fred Tenney's 1,363, and trailed only Ed Konetchy's 1,292 among all right-handed first basemen.

At the start of the 1963 season, prior to his retirement, Hodges had hit the most home runs (370) by a right-handed batter up to that point in time (surpassed by Willie Mays just before Hodges retired, on April 19) and the most career grand slams (14) by a National League player (surpassed by Willie McCovey's 18 grand slams). He shares the major league record of having hit four home runs in a single game (only 18 players have done so in Major League history).

Category	G	BA	AB	R	H	2B	3B	HR	RBI	SB	CS	BB	SO	OBP	SLG	OPS
Total	2,071	.273	7,030	1,105	1,921	295	48	370	1,274	63	42	943	1,137	.359	.487	.846

== Managerial career ==
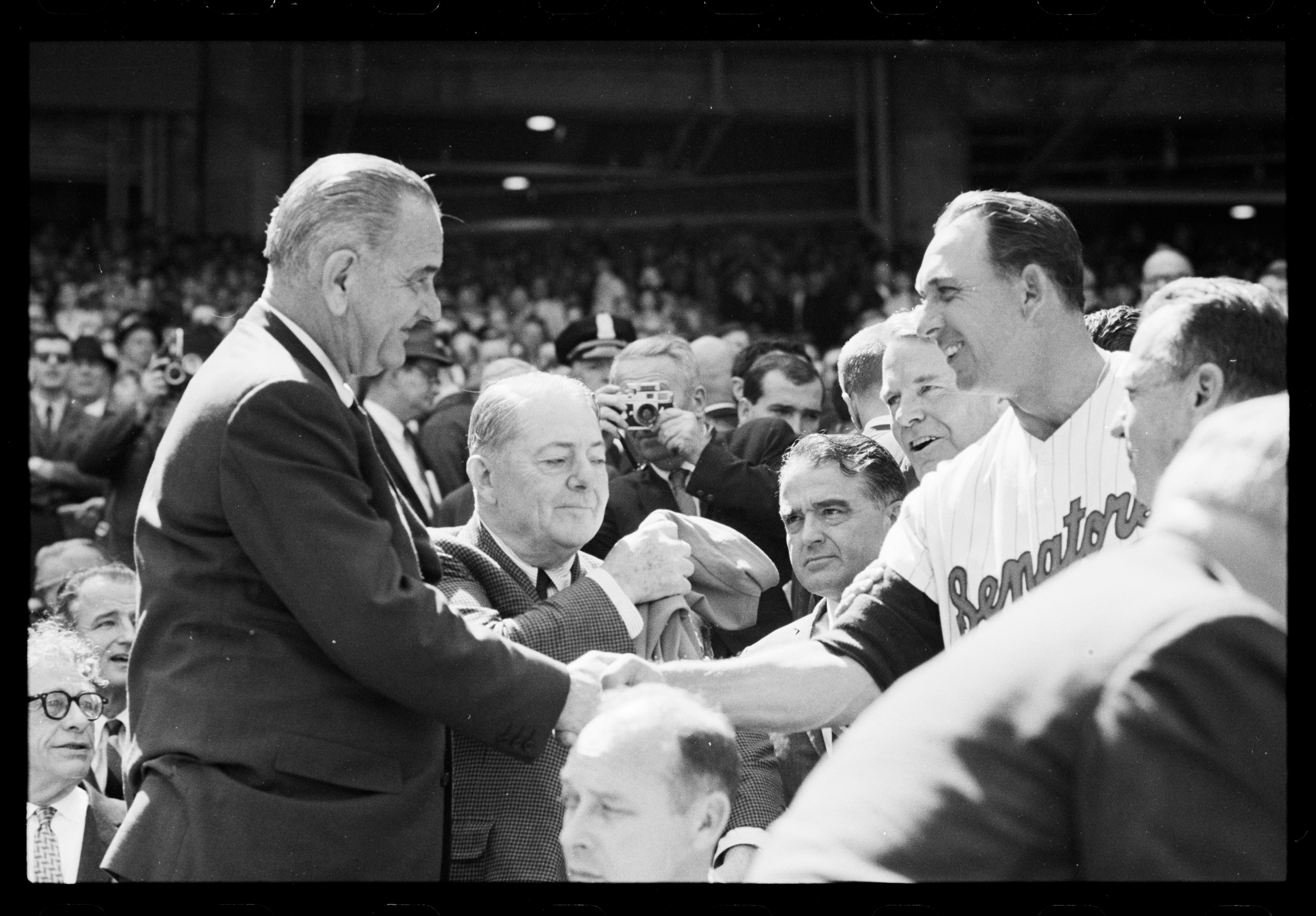
Hodges (right) as manager of the Washington Senators, shaking hands with President Lyndon B. Johnson in 1965

=== Washington Senators ===
Hodges began the 1963 season as an active player, but decided to retire when the expansion Washington Senators asked him to be their manager. After clearing waivers, the Mets traded Hodges to the Senators for outfielder Jimmy Piersall on May 23, retiring from his playing career.

Hodges managed the Senators through 1967, and, while they never achieved a winning record during his time as manager, the Senators improved on their record from the previous seasons, peaking with a 76–85 record in 1967.

In December 1964, the Senators arranged a seven-player trade with the Los Angeles Dodgers. Hodges received outfielder Frank Howard, his former teammate, catcher Doug Camilli, pitchers Nick Willhite, Phil Ortega, and Pete Richert, first baseman Dick Nen, and third baseman Ken McMullen. These players, Howard in particular, would become the core of the Senators franchise for the next few years and helped the team to a sixth-place finish in the 1967 season and their only winning season in 1969.

During the 1965 season, Hodges saved the life of pitcher Ryne Duren, who was in his final season and had signed with the Senators after being released by the Philadelphia Phillies. On August 18, after a bad outing against the Chicago White Sox, the last of his career, Duren attempted to commit suicide by jumping off a bridge, later recalling: "I put Gil through hell." The police went and got Hodges from the hotel at which the team was staying. Hodges managed to talk Duren down from the bridge, telling him, "You are too good to do this to yourself."

When New York Mets manager Wes Westrum resigned as manager in September 1967, the Mets sought out Hodges as his replacement. Although he had one year left on his contract with the Senators, Hodges decided to take up the Mets' offer as he considered it more convenient; he still had financial interests in Brooklyn and his family and home was there. Hodges was also popular in New York and, hence, a natural fit for the Mets. Senators GM George Selkirk obliged after the Mets paid them $100,000 and sent pitcher Bill Denehy over as compensation. Hodges then signed a three-year, $150,000 contract with the New York Mets.

=== New York Mets ===
When Hodges took over as manager of the Mets, the team had yet to finish with a winning season. At the 1968 All-Star break, the Mets were just four games below .500. However, they could not maintain the pace and subsequently lost 46 of their remaining 80 games. While the team only posted a 73–89 record, finishing 9th in the National League, it was nonetheless the best mark in their seven years of existence up to that point.

On September 24, 1968, Hodges, a chain smoker since he picked up the habit during his service in World War II, suffered from what was described as a "mild heart attack" during a game against the Atlanta Braves.

==== 1969: The "Miracle Mets" ====
In 1969, Hodges led the New York Mets to their first winning season and the National League East title. They swept the Atlanta Braves in the inaugural, best-of-five National League Championship Series. They then went on to beat the heavily favored Baltimore Orioles in the World Series in five games.

After losing Game 1, the team came back for four straight victories, including two by 2–1 scores. Finishing higher than ninth place for the first time, the Mets became not only the first expansion team to win a World Series, but also the first team to win the Fall Classic after finishing at least 15 games under .500 the previous year. Hodges was named The Sporting News Manager of the Year for 1969.

During Game 5, in the bottom of the sixth, Orioles pitcher Dave McNally bounced a pitch that appeared to have hit Mets left fielder Cleon Jones on the foot, then bounced into the Mets' dugout. McNally and the Orioles argued that the ball hit the dirt and not Jones, but Hodges showed the ball to home plate umpire Lou DiMuro, who found a spot of shoe polish on the ball and awarded Jones first base. McNally subsequently gave up a two-run home run to Mets first baseman Donn Clendenon to cut the Orioles lead to 3–2. The Mets eventually won the game and the series, 5–3.

The controversial decision has gone down in baseball lore as the "shoe polish" incident, and it highlighted Hodges's reputation for fair play, as he had never been thrown out a game for arguing, a fact that likely led to DiMuro ruling in favor of the Mets.

==== Final seasons ====
In Hodges's last two years as the manager of the Mets, the team had a winning record each time, finishing third in the National League East with an 83–79 record in both 1970 and 1971. However, his team never made the playoffs again.

In 1970, the Mets finished behind the Pittsburgh Pirates and the Chicago Cubs. In 1971, they finished tied at third with the Cubs in the NL East rankings, behind Pirates (eventual World Series champions) and the St. Louis Cardinals.

=== Managerial record ===
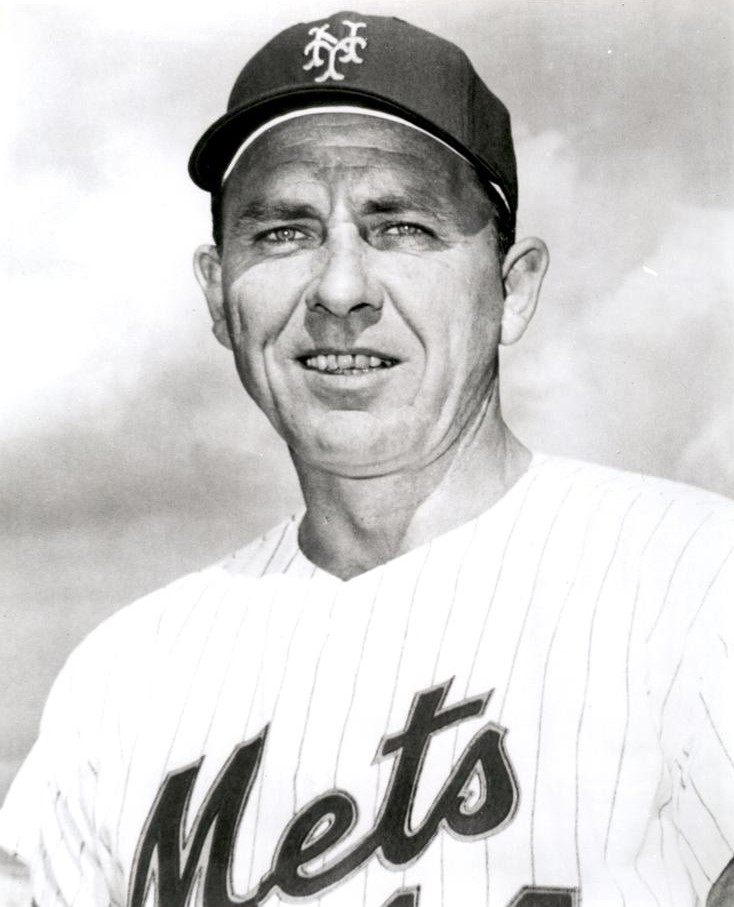
Hodges as the manager of the New York Mets c. 1971

Team	Year	Regular season					Postseason			
Team	Year	Games	Won	Lost	Win %	Finish	Won	Lost	Win %	Result
WSA	1963	121	42	79	.347	10th in AL	–	–	–	
WSA	1964	162	62	100	.383	9th in AL	–	–	–	
WSA	1965	162	70	92	.432	8th in AL	–	–	–	
WSA	1966	159	71	88	.447	8th in AL	–	–	–	
WSA	1967	161	76	85	.472	6th in AL	–	–	–	
WSA total		768	321	444	.420		–	–	–	
NYM	1968	163	73	89	.451	9th in NL	–	–	–	
NYM	1969	162	100	62	.617	1st in NL East	7	1	.875	Won World Series (BAL)
NYM	1970	162	83	79	.512	3rd in NL East	–	–	–	
NYM	1971	162	83	79	.512	3rd in NL East	–	–	–	
NYM total		648	339	309	.599		7	1	.875	
Total		1,414	660	753	.467		7	1	.875	

== Death and impact ==
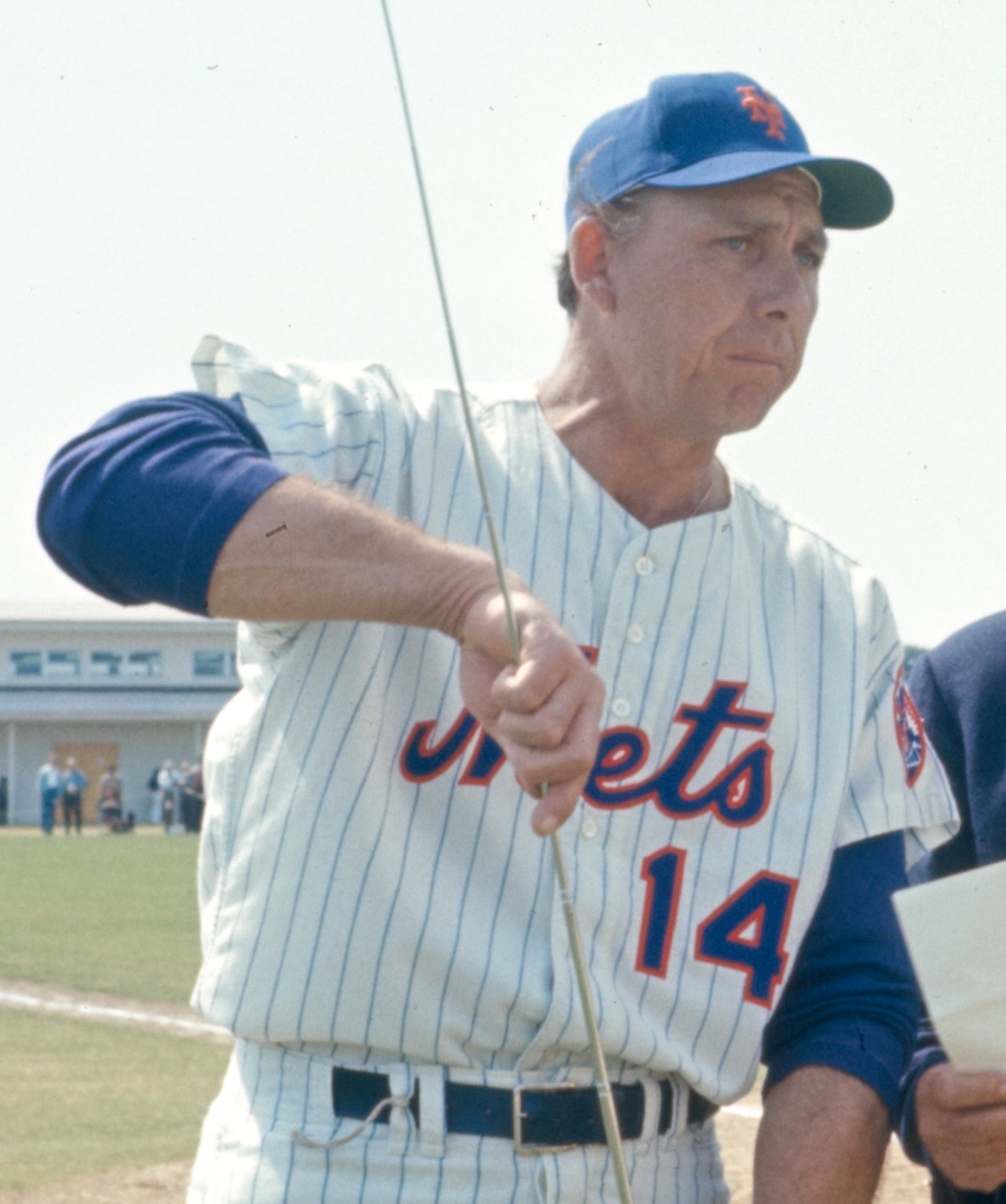
Hodges with the Mets during spring training in 1970

On the afternoon of April 2, 1972, Easter Sunday, Hodges was playing golf in West Palm Beach, Florida because the exhibition game between the Mets and the Montreal Expos was canceled by the first players' strike. He completed 27 holes of golf with Mets coaches Joe Pignatano, Rube Walker, and Eddie Yost, when he collapsed en route to his motel room at the Ramada Inn across the street from Municipal Stadium, then the spring training facility of the Atlanta Braves and Expos. Hodges had suffered a heart attack and was rushed to Good Samaritan Hospital where he died within 20 minutes of arrival. Pignatano later recalled Hodges falling backwards and hitting his head on the sidewalk with a "sickening knock", bleeding profusely and turning blue. Pignatano said "I put my hand under Gil's head, but before you knew it, the blood stopped. I knew he was dead. He died in my arms."

Jackie Robinson, himself ill with heart disease and diabetes, told the Associated Press, "He was the core of the Brooklyn Dodgers. With this, and what's happened to Campy and lot of other guys we played with, it scares you. I've been somewhat shocked by it all. I have tremendous feelings for Gil's family and kids." Robinson died of a heart attack six months later on October 24 at age 53.

Duke Snider said "Gil was a great player, but an even greater man." "I'm sick," said Johnny Podres, "I've never known a finer man." A crushed Carl Erskine said "Gil's death is like a bolt out of the blue." Don Drysdale, who himself died in Montreal of a heart attack in 1993 at age 56, wrote in his autobiography that Hodges's death "absolutely shattered me. I just flew apart. I didn't leave my apartment in Texas for three days. I didn't want to see anybody. I couldn't get myself to go to the funeral. It was like I'd lost a part of my family." According to Gil Hodges Jr., Howard Cosell, one of the many attendees at the wake, brought him into the back seat of a car, where Jackie Robinson had been crying hysterically. Robinson then held Hodges Jr. and said, "Next to my son's death, this is the worst day of my life."

The wake was held at Torregrossa Funeral Home, on Flatbush Avenue in Brooklyn. The funeral was held at Our Lady Help of Christians Church in Midwood, Brooklyn, on April 6. Approximately 600 people attended the church service inside, while thousands of mourners attended outside. Afterwards, he was buried at Holy Cross Cemetery in East Flatbush, Brooklyn, about a mile and half from where Ebbets Field used to be.

Yogi Berra, the Mets' first base coach, succeeded him as manager on the day of the funeral. The American flag flew at half-staff on Opening Day at Shea Stadium, while the Mets wore black armbands on their left arms during the entire 1972 season in honor of Hodges.

== Honors ==
Gil Hodges's number 14 was retired by the New York Mets in 1973.

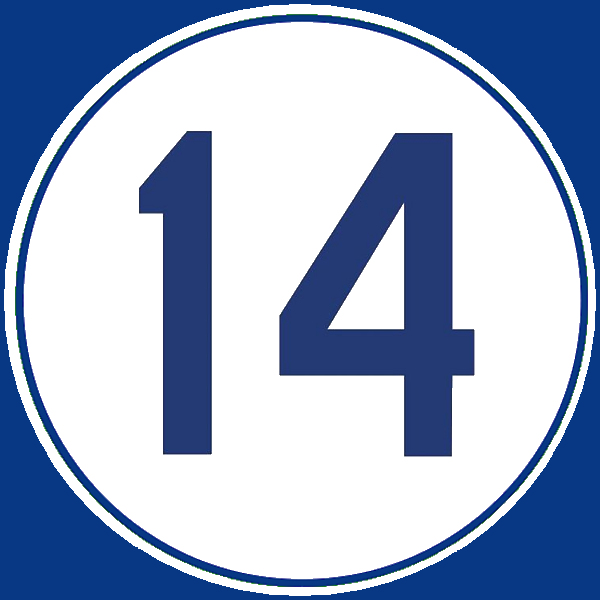
Gil Hodges's number 14 was retired by the Los Angeles Dodgers in 2022.

In 1969, Hodges received the Bronze Medallion, New York City's highest civilian honor from Mayor John Lindsay.

On June 9, 1973, one year after his death, the Mets retired Hodges's uniform number 14. After his election to the Baseball Hall of Fame in 2022, the Los Angeles Dodgers, his longtime team, honored Hodges by retiring his uniform number 14 on June 4, 2022, with the visiting New York Mets present for ceremony.

On April 4, 1978, what would have been Hodges's 54th birthday, the Marine Parkway Bridge, which connected Marine Park, Brooklyn to Rockaway, Queens, was renamed the Marine Parkway–Gil Hodges Memorial Bridge. Other Brooklyn locations named for him are a park on Carroll Street, a Little League field on Shell Road in Brooklyn, a section of Avenue L and P.S. 193. In addition, part of Bedford Avenue in Midwood, Brooklyn, is named Gil Hodges Way. A bowling alley in Mill Basin, Brooklyn, was formerly named Gil Hodges Lanes in his honor.

In Indiana, the high school baseball stadium in his birthplace of Princeton, Indiana is named after Hodges. A bridge spanning the East Fork of the White River in northern Pike County on State Road 57 was renamed the Gil Hodges Memorial Bridge. In addition, a Little League baseball team in his hometown of Petersburg was named the Hodges Dodgers, in his honor.

In 2009, a 52 by 16 foot (15.8 m × 4.9 m) mural was dedicated in Petersburg featuring pictures of Hodges as a Brooklyn Dodger, as manager of the New York Mets, and batting at Ebbets Field.

Hodges became an inaugural member of the Indiana Baseball Hall of Fame in 1979. He was inducted into the New York Mets Hall of Fame in 1982. In 2007, Hodges was inducted into the Marine Corps Sports Hall of Fame.

In 2000, Hodges was featured in the documentary Gil Hodges: The Quiet Man, based on the book of the same name by author Marino Amoruso. In November 2021, a 30-minute documentary, titled The Gil Hodges Story: Soul Of A Champion, was released. The film featured interviews with Vin Scully, Tommy Lasorda, Carl Erskine, Gil Hodges Jr., and members of the 1969 New York Mets.

=== Hall of Fame candidacy and election ===
For decades, there was controversy over Hodges not being selected for induction to the Baseball Hall of Fame. He was considered to be one of the finest players of the 1950s, and graduated to managerial success with the Mets. However, critics of his candidacy pointed out that despite his offensive prowess, he never led the National League in any offensive category such as home runs, runs batted in, or slugging percentage, and never came close to winning a Most Valuable Player award. Additionally, until the election of Tony Pérez in 2000, every first baseman in the Hall had either 500 career home runs or a batting average over .295; at the time of Hodges's death, the BBWAA had only elected two position players (Rabbit Maranville and Roy Campanella) with batting averages below .285. One theory for Hodges not being voted MVP may have resulted in part from his having had some of his best seasons (1950, 1954 and 1957) in years when the Dodgers did not win the pennant; his best finish was seventh in 1957.

==== BBWAA candidate ====
After last playing in the major leagues during the 1963 season, Hodges first appeared on the 1969 ballot, receiving 24.1% of ballots cast by BBWAA electors, with 75% the threshold for election. He was considered annually through the 1983 ballot, his 15th and final ballot appearance under BBWAA rules at the time. He appeared on 63.4% of ballots in 1983 voting, the highest percentage of his candidacy. Hodges collected 3,010 votes cast by the BBWAA from 1969 to 1983, the most votes for an unselected player until surpassed by Jim Rice in 2008, prior to Rice's election the following year.

==== Veterans Committee candidate ====
Hodges was considered for selection by the Hall of Fame's Veterans Committee starting in 1987. Voting by the committee was held in closed sessions for many years, but results are known for Hodges in 2003 voting (61%), 2005 (65%), 2007 (61%), and 2009 (43.8%). Each time, Hodges fell short of the 75% minimum required for election.

==== Golden Era/Golden Days candidate ====
In 2011, Hodges became a Golden Era candidate (1947–1972 era) for consideration to be elected to the Hall of Fame by the Golden Era Committee, which replaced the Veterans Committee in 2010. In December 2011, voting by the committee took place during the Hall of Fame's two-day winter meeting in Dallas, Texas. Induction to the Hall requires at least 12 votes (75%) from the 16-member committee. Of 10 candidates, Ron Santo was the only one elected, having received 15 votes; Jim Kaat had 10 votes, and Hodges and Minnie Miñoso were tied with nine votes.

Hodges's next opportunity under the Golden Era Committee was in December 2014, when the committee voted at the MLB winter meeting. Hodges received only three votes, and none of the other eight player candidates on the ballot were elected to the Hall of Fame, including Dick Allen and Tony Oliva, each of whom fell one vote shy of the 12-vote threshold. In July 2016, the Golden Era Committee was succeeded by a new system of four committees, including the Golden Days committee (1950–1969 era).

Hodges was one of 10 nominees named on November 5, 2021, to the Golden Days Era ballot for Hall of Fame consideration. On December 5, the Hall of Fame announced Hodges's election, having received 12 of 16 votes to meet the 75% threshold. Hodges was formally inducted on July 24, 2022, with his daughter Irene delivering a speech on his behalf.

== Personal life ==
In 1948, Hodges married Joan Lombardi (September 27, 1926 – September 17, 2022), a native of Brooklyn. The couple had four children together: Gilbert Jr., Irene, Cynthia, and Barbara. The family resided in Midwood, Brooklyn where Hodges had several business investments, including a bowling alley. His nephew by marriage is Tom Verducci, sportswriter for Sports Illustrated.

Joan Hodges outlived her husband by 50 years. She died in September 2022, a month after her husband's induction into the Baseball Hall of Fame and less than two weeks before her 96th birthday.

== See also ==
- List of Gold Glove Award winners at first base
- List of Major League Baseball career home run leaders
- List of Major League Baseball career runs scored leaders
- List of Major League Baseball career runs batted in leaders
- List of Major League Baseball career games played as a first baseman leaders
- List of Major League Baseball career putouts as a first baseman leaders
- List of Major League Baseball career assists as a first baseman leaders
- List of Major League Baseball career double plays as a first baseman leaders
- List of Major League Baseball players to hit for the cycle
- List of Major League Baseball single-game home run leaders
- List of baseball players who went directly to Major League Baseball

Achievements
Preceded by Wally Westlake	Hitting for the cycle June 25, 1949	Succeeded by Stan Musial
Preceded by Pat Seerey	Batters with 4 home runs in one game August 31, 1950	Succeeded by Joe Adcock
