= Ray DiMuro =

American baseball umpire (born 1967)

- Born: Ray DiMuro; October 12, 1967 (age 58); Dunkirk, New York, U.S.
- Occupation: Former MLB umpire
- Years active: 1996–1998
- Employer: Major League Baseball
- Height: 6 ft 3 in (1.91 m)

Raymond John DiMuro (born October 12, 1967) is an American former Major League Baseball umpire. He made his debut on May 28, 1996, and umpired his last game on August 30, 1998. He is also the son of former umpire Lou DiMuro and the twin brother of former major league umpire Mike DiMuro.

== See also ==
- List of Major League Baseball umpires (disambiguation)
