= Donn Clendenon =

American baseball player (1935–2005)

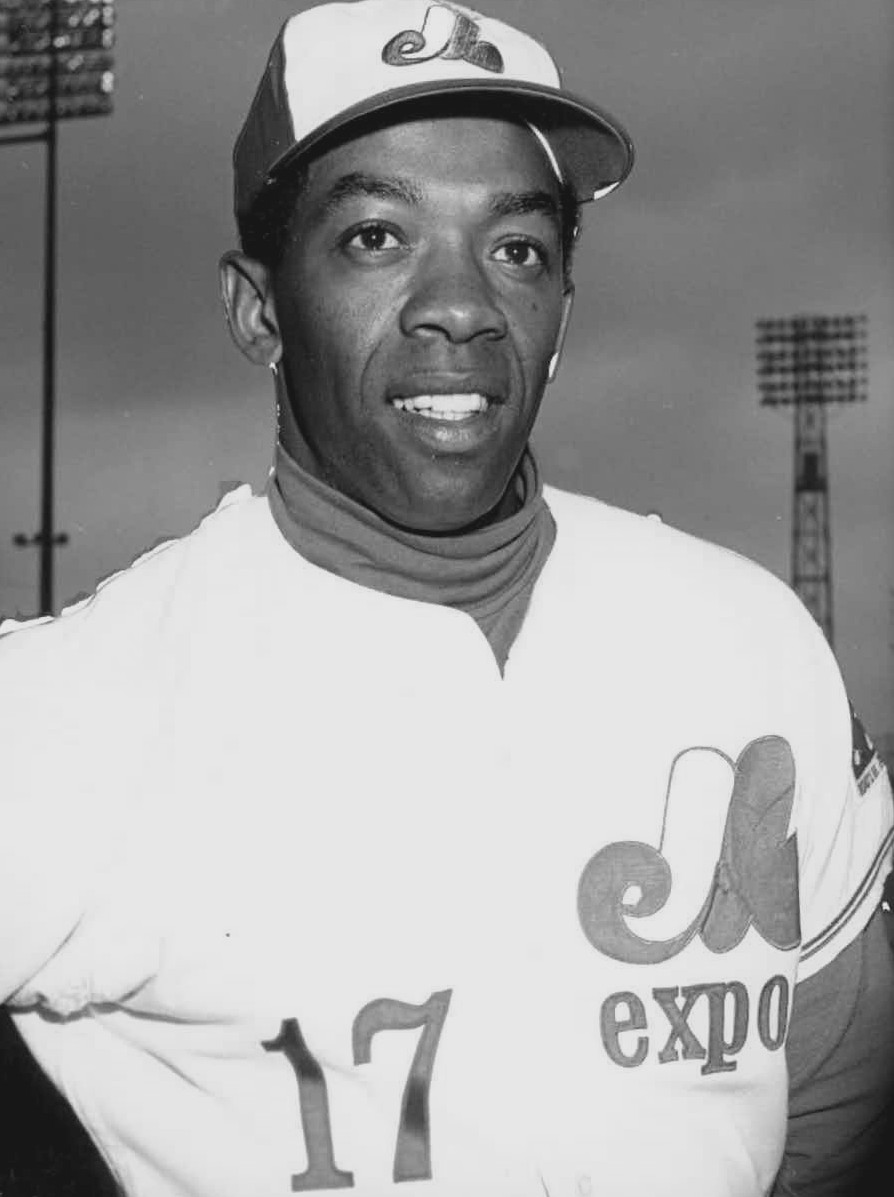
- Clendenon in 1969
- First baseman
- Born: July 15, 1935; Neosho, Missouri, U.S.
- Died: September 17, 2005 (aged 70); Sioux Falls, South Dakota, U.S.
- Batted: Right Threw: Right

MLB debut
- September 22, 1961, for the Pittsburgh Pirates

Last MLB appearance
- August 5, 1972, for the St. Louis Cardinals

MLB statistics
- Batting average: .274
- Home runs: 159
- Runs batted in: 682
- Stats at Baseball Reference

Teams
- Pittsburgh Pirates (1961–1968); Montreal Expos (1969); New York Mets (1969–1971); St. Louis Cardinals (1972)

Career highlights and awards
- World Series champion (1969); World Series MVP (1969)

Donn Alvin Clendenon (July 15, 1935 – September 17, 2005) was an American professional baseball player. He played in Major League Baseball (MLB) as a first baseman from 1961 to 1972 for the Pittsburgh Pirates, Montreal Expos, New York Mets and St. Louis Cardinals. Clendenon won the World Series Most Valuable Player Award for the 1969 World Series, during which he hit three home runs to help lead the "Miracle Mets" to an upset victory over the Baltimore Orioles.

== Early life ==
Six months after Clendenon was born in Neosho, Missouri, his father, Claude, died from leukemia. Claude Clendenon was a mathematics and psychology professor and chairman of the mathematics department at Langston University, an all-black school in Langston, Oklahoma. Clendenon's mother, Helen, demanded high academic achievement from her son. When he was six years old, Clendenon's mother married former Negro league baseball player Nish Williams. In addition to academic excellence, Clendenon's new stepfather decided he was going to make his stepson into a baseball player. Williams served as a coach on nearly every baseball team that Clendenon played on, including his college team at Atlanta's Morehouse College, and his semi-pro career with the Atlanta Black Crackers. Along with Williams, Clendenon received guidance from some of the players Williams knew from the Negro leagues, including Jackie Robinson, Satchel Paige, Roy Campanella and Don Newcombe.

== Morehouse College ==
Clendenon graduated as a letterman in nine sports at Booker T. Washington High School in Atlanta, Georgia, and received a host of scholarship offers. He was prepared to attend UCLA on a scholarship until some coaches from Morehouse College in Atlanta visited his mother, and convinced her that he should attend a school closer to home.

Morehouse College was and is one of the premier academic institutions for young African-American men. Just before Clendenon arrived in 1952, the freshman class were assigned "Big Brothers" to help the students acclimate themselves to Morehouse and college life. Although the policy had ended when he arrived, a Morehouse graduate volunteered to be Clendenon's big brother; his name was Martin Luther King Jr.

Clendenon became a twelve-time letterman in football, basketball and baseball at Morehouse, and had received contract offers from both the Cleveland Browns and the Harlem Globetrotters. Clendenon, however, decided he wanted to teach, and began teaching fourth grade upon graduation. Williams convinced Clendenon to attend a Pittsburgh Pirates try-out camp in 1957, and he signed with the team as an amateur free agent shortly afterwards.

== Major League Baseball career ==
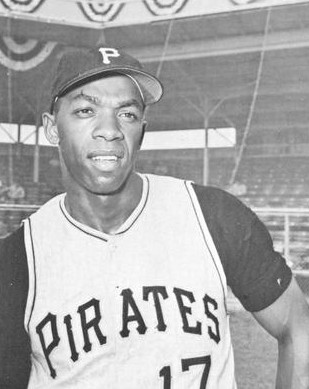
Clendenon in 1965

=== Pittsburgh Pirates ===
After five seasons in the minor leagues, Clendenon made his major league debut with Pittsburgh in 1961 as a September call-up. In his rookie season, 1962, Clendenon batted .302 with seven home runs and 28 runs batted in in eighty games to finish second in National League Rookie of the Year balloting to Chicago Cubs second baseman Ken Hubbs.

Following the 1962 season, the Pirates traded first baseman Dick Stuart to the Boston Red Sox to open a position for Clendenon. He responded by batting .275 with 15 home runs and 57 RBI. Clendenon drove in 96 and 98 in 1965 and 1966, respectively, and became a member of Pittsburgh's famed "Lumber Company" (although the term "Lumber Company was not actually used until the 1970s) along with Willie Stargell and Roberto Clemente. He also earned a reputation as a "free swinger" as he led the league in strikeouts in 1963 and 1968, and finished second in 1966 and third in 1965.

=== 1968 expansion draft ===
With first base prospect Al Oliver waiting in the wings, the Pirates left Clendenon unprotected for the 1968 Major League Baseball expansion draft, and he was selected by the Montreal Expos. On January 22, 1969, the Expos traded Clendenon and Jesús Alou to the Houston Astros for Rusty Staub; however, Clendenon refused to report to the Astros. In 1968 the Astros had hired Harry Walker to be their new manager. Clendenon had played under Walker in Pittsburgh—and Clendenon considered Walker to be a racist. He threatened to retire rather than play for the Astros.

Commissioner Bowie Kuhn forced the trade through, allowing Clendenon to stay with Montreal and ordering the Expos to send additional compensation to the Astros instead. Clendenon, who had not played for either the Astros or the Expos in the immediate aftermath of the trade, joined the Expos on April 19, 1969. He was batting .240 with four home runs and 14 RBI when the Expos dealt him to the New York Mets on June 15, 1969, in exchange for Steve Renko, Kevin Collins and two minor leaguers.

=== Amazin' Mets ===
The Mets were in second place, nine games back of Leo Durocher's Chicago Cubs in the newly aligned National League East, when they acquired Clendenon. Splitting time with Ed Kranepool at first base, Clendenon's numbers with the Mets did not improve immediately over those he put up with the Expos. Slowly, however, Clendenon's batting average began to rise; on August 30, Clendenon hit a 10th-inning home run against the San Francisco Giants to give the Mets the 3–2 win.

The Mets were 2 1/2 games back of Chicago when the Cubs came to Shea Stadium for a two-game set on September 8. The Mets swept the set to move within 1/2 game of first place, with Clendenon hitting a two-run home run in the Mets' 7–1 victory on the ninth.

The Mets won their next six in a row (10 total) to move 3 1/2 games over the Cubs. On September 24, Clendenon swung the big bat against the St. Louis Cardinals with a three-run home run and a solo shot to clinch the NL East. Overall, they won 38 of their last 49 games, and finished with 100 wins against 62 losses, eight games over the second-place Cubs.

==== 1969 World Series ====
Clendenon did not appear in the Mets' 1969 National League Championship Series three-game sweep of the Atlanta Braves. In the 1969 World Series against the Baltimore Orioles, Clendenon appeared in four of the five games, missing only Game 3. He went 2 for 4 in Game 1, scoring the Mets' only run in their 4–1 loss. He hit a fourth-inning home run in game two and a second-inning home run in game four to give the Mets early 1–0 leads in both games.

The Orioles were ahead 3–0 in Game 5 when Cleon Jones led off the sixth inning. Dave McNally appeared to hit Jones in the foot with a pitch; however, home plate umpire Lou DiMuro ruled that the ball had missed Jones. Mets manager Gil Hodges emerged from the dugout to argue, and showed DiMuro a shoe-polish smudge on the ball. DiMuro reversed his call, and awarded Jones first base. Clendenon followed with a two-run home run to pull the Mets within a run. The Mets eventually won the game, 5–3, to complete their improbable World Series victory over the heavily-favored Orioles.

For the series, Clendenon batted .357 (5 for 14) with three home runs and four RBI, and was named World Series MVP. His three home runs remained tied for most home runs in a five-game Series with Ryan Howard in the 2008 World Series and Steve Pearce in the 2018 World Series. This record lasted until the 2024 World Series when Freddie Freeman broke the record with 4 home runs in a five-game series.

=== Later career ===
On July 28, 1970, Clendenon set a Mets record by driving in seven runs with a pair of three-run homers and a sacrifice fly. The Mets were in second place, one game back of the Pirates at the end of play that day. However, they sputtered from there, ending the season in third place, six games back of the division winning Pirates. Clendenon batted .288 with 22 home runs for the season, and set the Mets' single season RBI record with 97.

After having been demoted to the Tidewater Tides in 1970, Ed Kranepool enjoyed a career year with the Mets in 1971. With first base prospects Mike Jorgensen and John Milner also both waiting in the wings, Clendenon became the odd man out, and was released by the Mets at the end of the 1971 season.

Clendenon signed with the St. Louis Cardinals for the 1972 season, but saw very limited playing time behind Matty Alou. He was released on August 7 with a .191 batting average, four home runs and just nine RBIs. Three weeks after Clendenon's release, the Cardinals dealt Alou to the Oakland Athletics and spent the rest of the season with a revolving door at first base.

Seasons	Games	AB	Runs	Hits	2B	3B	HR	RBI	SB	BB	SO	HBP	Avg.	Slg.	OBP	Fld%
12	1362	4648	594	1273	192	57	159	682	90	379	1140	21	.274	.442	.328	.987

== Post-baseball ==
After retiring, Clendenon returned to Pittsburgh and earned a Juris Doctor degree from Duquesne University in 1978, then began practicing law in Dayton, Ohio. He recounted the 1969 New York Mets season in his book, Miracle In New York, in which he also talked about growing up in Atlanta, graduating from law school, and battling drug addiction as he neared his 50th birthday.

He eventually entered a drug rehabilitation facility in Ogden, Utah, and during a physical examination in connection with his treatment, learned he had leukemia. That prompted his move to Sioux Falls, South Dakota, in 1987, where he worked with Carlsen, Carter, Hoy & Eirenberg before becoming general counsel to the Interstate Audit Corporation. He also worked for many years as a chemical dependency counselor and was devoted to helping others in their recoveries. Clendenon died in Sioux Falls in 2005 at age 70 after a long bout with leukemia.

He was survived by his wife, Anne; his sons, Donn, Jr. and Val, his daughter, Donna Clendenon, and six grandsons. Shortly before his death, he was inducted into the Georgia Sports Hall of fame.

== See also ==
- List of Negro league baseball players who played in Major League Baseball
