= 1978 Major League Baseball postseason =

1978 Major League Baseball playoffs

Tournament details
- Dates: October 3–17, 1978
- Teams: 4

Final positions
- Champions: New York Yankees (22nd title)
- Runners-up: Los Angeles Dodgers

Tournament statistics
- Games played: 14
- Attendance: 765,675 (54,691 per game)
- Most HRs: Davey Lopes (LA) (5)
- Most SBs: Amos Otis (KC) (4)
- Best ERA: Ron Guidry (NYY) (1.06)
- Most Ks (as pitcher): Five tied (11)

Awards
- MVP: Bucky Dent (NYY)

The 1978 Major League Baseball postseason was the playoff tournament of Major League Baseball for the 1978 season. The winners of each division advance to the postseason and face each other in a League Championship Series to determine the pennant winners that face each other in the World Series.

This was the second of two consecutive postseasons to feature the same teams – in the American League, the New York Yankees and Kansas City Royals returned for the third year in a row.

In the National League, the Philadelphia Phillies made their third straight appearance, and the Los Angeles Dodgers returned for the third time in the last five years. The former three teams all returned for the 1980 postseason, and all four returned in the expanded 1981 and 2024 postseasons. As of 2026, this is the last instance in which the same teams made up the season’s postseason field in back-to-back years.

The postseason began on October 3, 1978, and concluded on October 17, 1978, with the Yankees again defeating the Dodgers in six games in the 1978 World Series. The Yankees repeated as World Series champions, winning their 22nd championship.

== Teams ==
American League Teams National League Teams

The following teams qualified for the postseason:

=== American League ===
- New York Yankees – 100–63, AL East champions
- Kansas City Royals – 92–70, AL West champions

=== National League ===
- Philadelphia Phillies – 90–72, NL East champions
- Los Angeles Dodgers – 95–67, NL West champions

== Playoff bracket ==
League Championship Series (ALCS, NLCS)
East	NY Yankees	3
West	Kansas City	1
East	Philadelphia	1
West	Los Angeles	3

World Series
AL	NY Yankees	4
NL	Los Angeles	2

== American League Championship Series ==
=== New York Yankees vs. Kansas City Royals ===
New York won the series, 3–1.

Game	Date	Score	Location	Time	Attendance
1	October 3	New York Yankees – 7, Kansas City Royals – 1	Royals Stadium	2:57	41,143
2	October 4	New York Yankees – 4, Kansas City Royals – 10	Royals Stadium	2:42	41,158
3	October 6	Kansas City Royals – 5, New York Yankees – 6	Yankee Stadium	2:13	55,445
4	October 7	Kansas City Royals – 1, New York Yankees – 2	Yankee Stadium	2:20	56,356

For the third year in a row, the Yankees and Royals met in the ALCS, and once again the Yankees came out on top, this time in four games, to return to the World Series for the third year in a row.

Jim Beattie pitched five innings of shutout ball as the Yankees blew out the Royals in Game 1 on the road. In Game 2, Larry Gura went six shutout innings as the Royals responded with a blowout win of their own to even the series headed to the Bronx. Game 3 was a slugfest that the Yankees narrowly won, thanks to a two-run home run from Thurman Munson in the bottom of the eighth. Game 4 was a pitchers' duel between Yankees' ace Ron Guidry and Royals' ace Dennis Leonard, which would be won by the former as the Yankees narrowly prevailed by one run to secure the pennant.

Both teams would meet again in the ALCS in 1980 - where the Royals finally broke through in a sweep before falling in the World Series to the Philadelphia Phillies in six games. They would also meet in the ALDS in 2024, which was won by the Yankees before they too fell in the World Series.

The Yankees would win their next pennant in 1981 over the Oakland Athletics in a sweep before coming up short in the World Series.

== National League Championship Series ==
=== Los Angeles Dodgers vs. Philadelphia Phillies ===
Los Angeles won the series, 3–1.

Game	Date	Score	Location	Time	Attendance
1	October 4	Los Angeles Dodgers – 9, Philadelphia Phillies – 5	Veterans Stadium	2:37	63,460
2	October 5	Los Angeles Dodgers – 4, Philadelphia Phillies – 0	Veterans Stadium	2:06	60,642
3	October 6	Philadelphia Phillies – 9, Los Angeles Dodgers – 4	Dodger Stadium	2:18	55,043
4	October 7	Philadelphia Phillies – 3, Los Angeles Dodgers – 4 (10)	Dodger Stadium	2:53	55,124

For the second consecutive year, the Dodgers and Phillies met in the NLCS. The Dodgers yet again prevailed in four games and advanced to the World Series for the second straight year.

The Dodgers stole a Game 1 slugfest on the road, 9–5. In Game 2, the Dodgers prevailed off a complete-game shutout from ace Tommy John. When the series shifted to Los Angeles for Game 3, Steve Carlton pitched a complete game as the Phillies blew out the Dodgers to get on the board in the series. However, the Dodgers ended up winning the pennant in Game 4 with a narrow victory in extra innings as Ron Cey scored the pennant-clinching run in the bottom of the tenth.

The Phillies would finally win the pennant two years later over the Houston Astros in a tightly-contested five-game NLCS en route to their first ever World Series championship after being six outs away from elimination in Game 5.

The Dodgers would win their next pennant in 1981 over the Montreal Expos in five games en route to a World Series title.

This was the last time the Dodgers defeated the Phillies in the postseason until 2025, as the Phillies would win the next three matchups against them in 1983, 2008 and 2009.

== 1978 World Series ==
=== New York Yankees (AL) vs. Los Angeles Dodgers (NL) ===
New York won the series, 4–2.

Game	Date	Score	Location	Time	Attendance
1	October 10	New York Yankees – 5, Los Angeles Dodgers – 11	Dodger Stadium	2:48	55,997
2	October 11	New York Yankees – 3, Los Angeles Dodgers – 4	Dodger Stadium	2:37	55,982
3	October 13	Los Angeles Dodgers – 1, New York Yankees – 5	Yankee Stadium	2:27	56,447
4	October 14	Los Angeles Dodgers – 3, New York Yankees – 4 (10)	Yankee Stadium	3:17	56,445
5	October 15	Los Angeles Dodgers – 2, New York Yankees – 12	Yankee Stadium	2:56	56,448
6	October 17	New York Yankees – 7, Los Angeles Dodgers – 2	Dodger Stadium	2:34	55,985

This was the tenth World Series meeting in the history of the Dodgers–Yankees rivalry, and the fifth New York–California matchup in the World Series (1962, 1963, 1973, 1977). In a near identical outcome to last year's series, the Yankees overcame a two-games-to-none series deficit to again defeat the Dodgers in six games, repeating as World Series champions.

Tommy John pitched six innings of shutout ball and Davey Lopes homered twice as the Dodgers blew out the Yankees in Game 1. In Game 2, the Yankees led 2-1 after five innings, until Ron Cey hit a three-run homer in the bottom of the sixth to put the Dodgers in the lead for good as they went up 2–0 in the series headed to the Bronx. Then, the Yankees responded. Ron Guidry pitched a complete game as the Yankees got on the board in the series in Game 3. Game 4 remained tied after regulation, until Lou Piniella hit a walk-off RBI single in the bottom of the tenth to even the series at two. In Game 5, Jim Beattie pitched another complete game for the Yankees as they blew out the Dodgers by ten runs to take a 3–2 series lead headed back to Los Angeles. Catfish Hunter pitched seven solid innings in Game 6 as the Yankees blew out the Dodgers again to clinch the title.

Game 6 of the 1978 World Series was the last for Yankees catcher Thurman Munson, who died in a plane crash on August 2, 1979, at Akron-Canton Airport in Ohio.

As of 2026, this is the last time the Yankees defeated the Dodgers in the World Series. These historical rivals would meet again in the World Series in 1981 and 2024, both of which the Dodgers won.

After repeating as champions, the Yankees entered a rare and unusual slump, making the postseason only twice between 1979 and 1995. The Yankees would return to the World Series in 1996, and defeated the Atlanta Braves in six games to end an 18-year title drought, which also marked the start of a dynasty for the team.

== Broadcasting ==
ABC televised both LCS nationally in the United States. Each team's local broadcaster also televised coverage of LCS games. NBC aired the World Series.
