= 1978 American League East tie-breaker game =

1978 Major League Baseball tie-breaker game

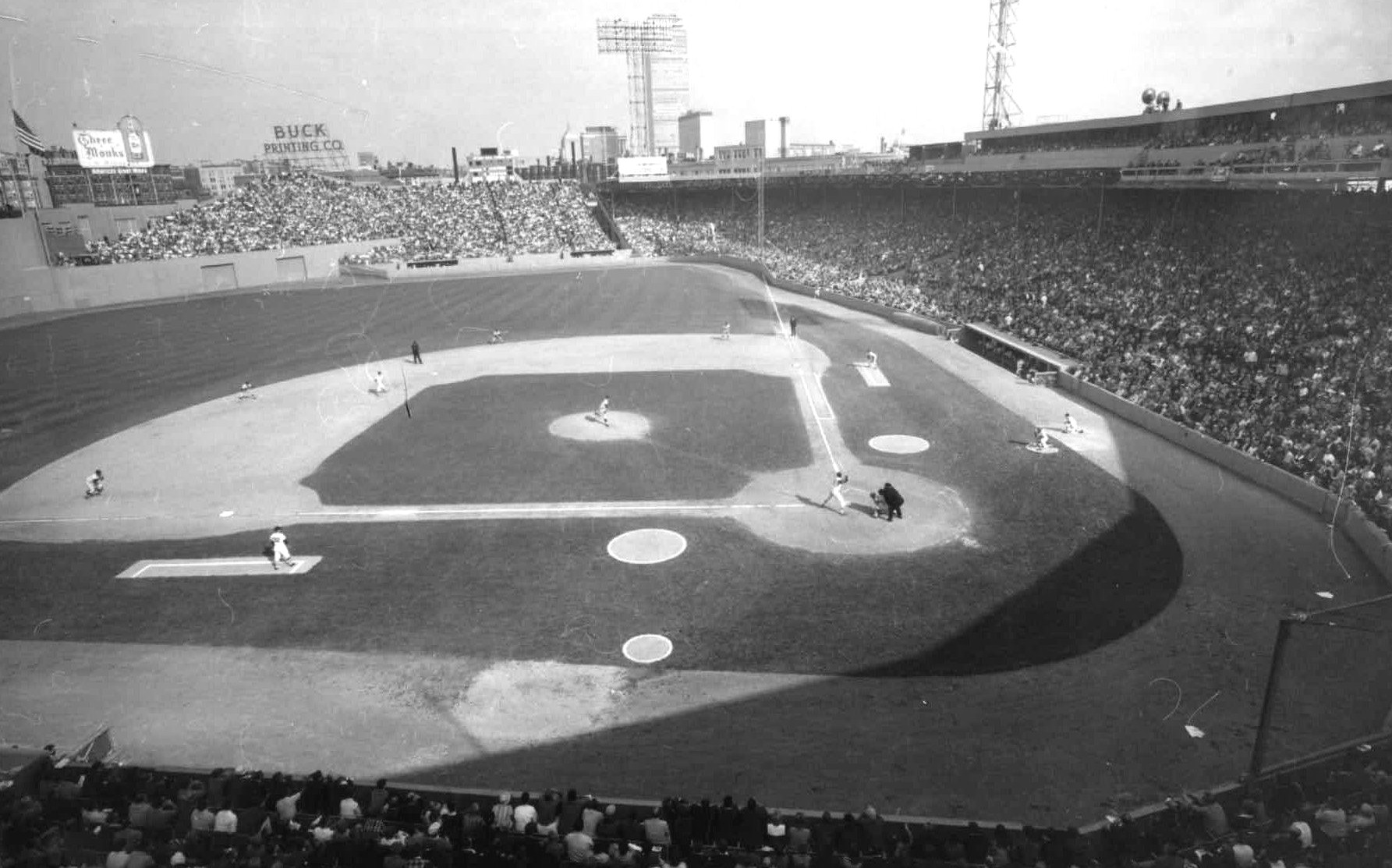
- Fenway Park in 1967
	1	2	3	4	5	6	7	8	9	R	H	E
New York Yankees	0	0	0	0	0	0	4	1	0	5	8	0
Boston Red Sox	0	1	0	0	0	1	0	2	0	4	11	0
- Date: October 2, 1978
- Venue: Fenway Park
- City: Boston, Massachusetts
- Umpires: HP: Don Denkinger; 1B: Jim Evans; 2B: Al Clark; 3B: Steve Palermo
- Attendance: 32,925
- Television: ABC; WPIX (NYY); WSBK-TV (BOS)
- TV announcers: ABC: Keith Jackson and Don Drysdale; WPIX: Phil Rizzuto, Frank Messer and Bill White; WSBK-TV: Ken Harrelson and Dick Stockton
- Radio: CBS; WINS (NYY); WITS (BOS)
- Radio announcers: CBS: Ernie Harwell and Win Elliot; WINS: White, Rizzuto, Messer and Fran Healy; WITS: Jim Woods and Ned Martin

The 1978 American League East tie-breaker game was a one-game extension to Major League Baseball's (MLB) 1978 regular season. The game was played at Fenway Park in Boston on the afternoon of Monday, October 2 between the rival New York Yankees and Boston Red Sox to determine the winner of the American League's (AL) East Division.

The tie-breaker was necessitated after the Yankees and Red Sox finished the season tied for first place in the AL East with identical 99–63 (.611) records. Entering the final day of the season on Sunday, October 1, the Yankees had a one-game lead; they lost 9–2 to Cleveland while Boston shut out Toronto 5–0 to force the playoff. The Red Sox were the home team by virtue of a coin toss. In baseball statistics, the tie-breaker counted as the 163rd regular season game for both teams, with all events in the game added to regular season statistics.

Ron Guidry started for the Yankees, while Mike Torrez started for the Red Sox. The Red Sox took a 1–0 lead in the second inning with a home run by left fielder Carl Yastrzemski and extended their lead to 2–0 in the sixth on a run batted in single by right fielder Jim Rice. The game is perhaps most remembered for the seventh inning, when light-hitting shortstop Bucky Dent lifted a three-run home run over the left field wall to give the Yankees a 3–2 lead, which has led to the game being commonly nicknamed the "Bucky Dent Game". After the home run, the Yankees added two more runs, giving them a 5–2 lead. The Red Sox scored two more runs, but the Yankees ultimately won the game when relief pitcher Goose Gossage got Yastrzemski to pop out to third baseman Graig Nettles to earn the save. Guidry was the winning pitcher, while Torrez received the loss.

With the victory, the Yankees finished the regular season with a 100–63 (.613) record and clinched the AL East championship, en route to winning the World Series. This was the first tie-breaker to be contested after the introduction of divisional play in 1969. The 1978 Yankees are the last team to win the World Series after playing a tie-breaker, due to the elimination of tie-breaker games beginning with the 2022 season, because of postseason expansion.

== Background ==
The Yankees and Red Sox had combined to win the past three American League (AL) pennants. The Red Sox lost the World Series in 1975, the Yankees lost in 1976, and then won in 1977. Heading into 1978, the Yankees, Red Sox, and Baltimore Orioles, who had also challenged for the AL East championship in 1977, all expected to contend for the AL East title. The Orioles and Red Sox had tied for second place in 1977, 2 1/2 games behind the Yankees. The young Detroit Tigers, with Lou Whitaker and Alan Trammell, also appeared ready to challenge for the AL East.

The Red Sox signed Mike Torrez, who won two games in the 1977 World Series for the Yankees, as a free agent during the offseason. Before the season, the Red Sox acquired Dennis Eckersley to join Torrez, Bill Lee, and Luis Tiant in their starting pitching rotation. The Yankees, meanwhile, acquired Goose Gossage and Rawly Eastwick to join Sparky Lyle, 1977's AL Cy Young Award winner, in their bullpen during the offseason. Both teams placed five players on the AL squad for the All-Star Game: Gossage, Ron Guidry, Graig Nettles, Thurman Munson, and Reggie Jackson represented the Yankees, while Carl Yastrzemski, Fred Lynn, Rick Burleson, Carlton Fisk, and Jim Rice represented the Red Sox.

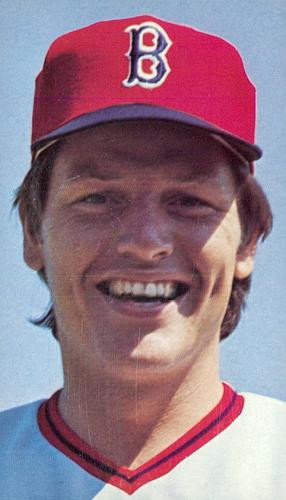
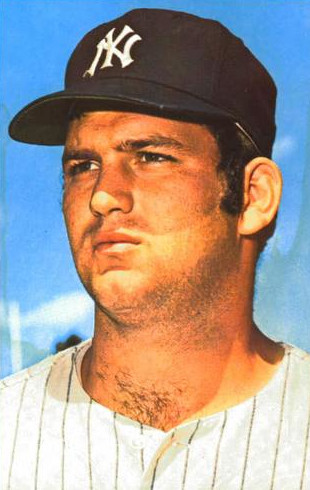
The rivalry between Carlton Fisk (left) and Thurman Munson (right) was at the core of the Yankees–Red Sox tension of the 1970s.

The Red Sox had once led the division by ten games; the Milwaukee Brewers were in second place, while the Yankees were in third. The Yankees experienced injuries to Willie Randolph, Catfish Hunter, Bucky Dent, and Mickey Rivers, and fell to fourth place in the division, as Baltimore moved into third. After a shake-up engineered by owner George Steinbrenner, with Munson moving from catcher to right field, the Yankees fired their combustible manager Billy Martin on July 24, replacing him with Bob Lemon. The Yankees had lost four of five after the All-Star break, including a three-game sweep by Kansas City in New York which ended with a club suspension of Reggie Jackson; at 47–42 (.528), they trailed Boston by 14 games on the morning of July 19. However, New York finished the season 52–21 (.712) in their last 73 games, while the Red Sox went 38–35 (.521) over the same time frame. This included a four-game sweep of Boston in Fenway Park in early September, in which the Yankees outscored the Red Sox by a composite score of 42–9; the series was dubbed "The Boston Massacre" by the sports press. By the end of the four games on Sunday, September 10, the two teams were tied for first place at 86–56 (.606), with twenty games remaining.

The Yankees took the AL East lead three days later and did not lose it until the final day of the season. The margin was up to 3 1/2 games after another win over the Red Sox on Saturday, September 16, but results were different the next day, the first of Boston's dozen wins over the final two weeks. Clinging to a one-game lead with seven remaining, New York won six straight, but dropped the finale at home to struggling Cleveland on Sunday, October 1. Boston won their final eight games to catch the Yanks; after the Indians' win, a 9–2 complete game victory by left-hander Rick Waits, the Fenway Park video screen flashed the happy news: "THANK YOU RICK WAITS, GAME TOMORROW."

== The game ==
The tie-breaker game was the first in the AL since 1948, when the Indians defeated the Red Sox for the pennant at Fenway Park, and the first in the majors since the advent of the division system in 1969. Guidry, who had won 24 games in the 162-game regular season, started on three days of rest, less than usual, and Torrez started the game for the Red Sox. He started for the Red Sox on Opening Day and had a 16–12 record, but contributed to the Red Sox struggles late in the season with six consecutive losses. Game time was 2:30 p.m. EDT, televised nationally on ABC.

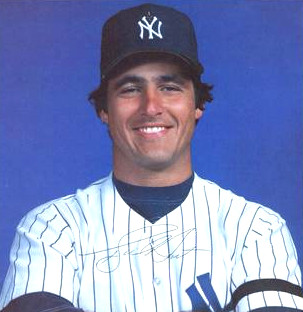
Bucky Dent

Carl Yastrzemski hit a home run in the second inning, and Jim Rice drove in Rick Burleson with a single in the sixth inning, giving the Red Sox a 2–0 lead. Meanwhile, Torrez held the Yankees to two hits through six innings. With one out in the seventh inning, Chris Chambliss and Roy White of the Yankees both singled off of Torrez, and pinch hitter Jim Spencer flied out. Dent then hit a fly ball that cleared the Green Monster wall in left field for a three-run home run to give the Yankees a 3–2 lead.

Torrez was removed from the game after walking Mickey Rivers. Reliever Bob Stanley came in, and after Rivers stole second Thurman Munson drove him in with a double. In the eighth inning, a home run by Reggie Jackson made the score 5–2. The Red Sox cut New York's lead to just one run in the bottom of the eighth against closer Goose Gossage on RBI singles by Fred Lynn and Yastrzemski. But the Yankees would hold off the Red Sox, thanks in part to a heads-up defensive play by right fielder Lou Piniella with one out in the bottom of the ninth. With Burleson on first base, Jerry Remy hit a line drive to Piniella in right field, but Piniella was blinded by the late afternoon sun and could not see the ball. However, he pretended to field the play normally, pounding his glove as though he would easily catch the ball, then stabbed at the ball on a bounce as it almost passed him. This prevented Burleson from advancing to third base; when Rice followed with a deep fly to the outfield, Burleson could only move up to third base instead of scoring the tying run.

Batting with two out and two men on, Yastrzemski popped out to third baseman Graig Nettles in foul territory for the game's final out, and New York won the game, 5–4. Guidry improved his record to 25–3 (.893), while Torrez took the loss; Gossage recorded his 27th save.

== Line score ==
Monday, October 2, 1978 2:30 pm (EDT) at Fenway Park in Boston, Massachusetts 67 °F (19 °C) Partly Cloudy
Team	1	2	3	4	5	6	7	8	9	R	H	E
New York	0	0	0	0	0	0	4	1	0	5	8	0
Boston	0	1	0	0	0	1	0	2	0	4	11	0
WP: Ron Guidry (25–3) LP: Mike Torrez (16–13) Sv: Goose Gossage (27); Home runs: NYY: Bucky Dent (5), Reggie Jackson (27); BOS: Carl Yastrzemski (17); Attendance: 32,925

== Box score ==
New York	AB	R	H	RBI	BB	SO	AVG
Mickey Rivers, CF	2	1	1	0	2	0	.265
Paul Blair, PH–CF	1	0	1	0	0	0	.176
Thurman Munson, C	5	0	1	1	0	3	.297
Lou Piniella, RF	4	0	1	0	0	0	.314
Reggie Jackson, DH	4	1	1	1	0	0	.274
Graig Nettles, 3B	4	0	0	0	0	1	.276
Chris Chambliss, 1B	4	1	1	0	0	0	.274
Roy White, LF	3	1	1	0	1	1	.269
Gary Thomasson, LF	0	0	0	0	0	0	.233
Brian Doyle, 2B	2	0	0	0	0	0	.192
Jim Spencer, PH	1	0	0	0	0	0	.227
Fred Stanley, 2B	1	0	0	0	0	0	.219
Bucky Dent, SS	4	1	1	3	0	1	.243
Team totals	35	5	8	5	3	6	.229

New York	IP	H	R	ER	BB	SO	HR	ERA
Ron Guidry, W (25–3)	6 1/3	6	2	2	1	5	1	1.74
Goose Gossage, S (27)	2 2/3	5	2	2	1	2	0	2.01
Team totals	9	11	4	4	2	7	1	4.00

Boston	AB	R	H	RBI	BB	SO	AVG
Rick Burleson, SS	4	1	1	0	1	1	.248
Jerry Remy, 2B	4	1	2	0	0	0	.278
Jim Rice, RF	5	0	1	1	0	1	.315
Carl Yastrzemski, LF	5	2	2	2	0	1	.277
Carlton Fisk, C	3	0	1	0	1	0	.284
Fred Lynn, CF	4	0	1	1	0	0	.298
Butch Hobson, DH	4	0	1	0	0	1	.250
George Scott, 1B	4	0	2	0	0	2	.233
Jack Brohamer, 3B	1	0	0	0	0	0	.234
Bob Bailey, PH	1	0	0	0	0	1	.191
Frank Duffy, 3B	0	0	0	0	0	0	.260
Dwight Evans, PH	1	0	0	0	0	0	.247
Team totals	36	4	11	4	2	7	.306

Boston	IP	H	R	ER	BB	SO	HR	ERA
Mike Torrez, L (16–13)	6 2/3	5	4	4	3	4	1	3.96
Bob Stanley	0 1/3	2	1	1	0	0	1	2.60
Andy Hassler	1 2/3	1	0	0	0	2	0	3.87
Dick Drago	0 1/3	0	0	0	0	0	0	3.03
Team totals	9	8	5	5	3	6	2	5.00

== Broadcast coverage ==
This game was televised regionally by the respective teams' rights holders, WSBK-TV in Boston and WPIX in New York City. ABC Sports picked up the contest for national viewers, and thus provided alternate coverage of the game on its New York and Boston affiliates. Keith Jackson and Don Drysdale called the action in the ABC booth.

On radio, the CBS Radio Network offered national coverage of the game, with Ernie Harwell doing play-by-play and Win Elliot working as a color commentator. Locally in the home markets, WINS in New York City and WITS in Boston fed the game to the teams' respective radio networks.

In the Red Sox' broadcast booth, Dick Stockton and Ken "Hawk" Harrelson worked the television side while Ned Martin and Jim Woods were heard on radio. In the Yankees' booth, Phil Rizzuto, Bill White, and Frank Messer alternated play-by-play on both radio and television, and were backed up on radio by Fran Healy.

== Aftermath ==
For the third straight year, the Yankees went on to face the Kansas City Royals in the 1978 American League Championship Series. The Yankees won the best-of-five series for their third consecutive pennant. New York defeated the Los Angeles Dodgers in the World Series to win their second consecutive championship, and 22nd overall.

The loss by the Red Sox was seen as a manifestation of the Curse of the Bambino, long thought to be the reason behind a decades-long litany of failures for the Red Sox after owner Harry Frazee sold Babe Ruth to the Yankees on January 5, 1920. Described as a "shocking blast" by the Sporting News, Dent's home run silenced the Fenway Park crowd. For the light-hitting Dent, it was just his fifth home run of the 1978 season. It sealed Dent's reputation among Yankee fans, while inspiring the permanent nickname "Bucky Fucking Dent" in New England. Twenty-five years later, in Game 7 of the 2003 American League Championship Series, Aaron Boone received similar treatment by Red Sox fans after he hit the home run in the bottom of the 11th inning that clinched the pennant for the Yankees, but the Yankees later lost to the Miami Marlins in the World Series, which went six games.

Guidry and Rice were considered candidates for the AL Most Valuable Player (MVP) Award for their strong seasons. Rice was named MVP, with Guidry finishing second in the voting. Guidry won the AL Cy Young Award. Lemon was named AL Manager of the Year.

On June 6, 1990, Dent, manager of the Yankees, was fired during a series in Boston.
