= 1978 Los Angeles Dodgers season =

1978 Los Angeles Dodgers
- National League champions National League West champions
- League: National League
- Division: West
- Ballpark: Dodger Stadium
- City: Los Angeles, California
- Record: 95–67 (.586)
- Divisional place: 1st
- Owner: Walter O'Malley
- President: Peter O'Malley
- General managers: Al Campanis
- Managers: Tommy Lasorda
- Television: KTTV (11)
- Radio: KABC; Vin Scully, Jerry Doggett, Ross Porter; XEGM; Jaime Jarrín, Rudy Hoyos

The 1978 Los Angeles Dodgers season was the 89th season for the Los Angeles Dodgers franchise in Major League Baseball (MLB), their 21st season in Los Angeles, California, and their 17th season playing their home games at Dodger Stadium in Los Angeles California.

The team won their second straight National League pennant and losing to the New York Yankees in the World Series again. Dodger coach Jim Gilliam died at the end of the season and his uniform number, 19, was retired by the team prior to Game 1 of the World Series; the team also wore a black memorial patch with Gilliam's number during the World Series. Unlike the previous Dodger team, no member of the team hit 30 home runs after seeing four members hit that mark the previous season (the team leader was Reggie Smith, with 29).

== Offseason ==
- November 23, 1977: Dennis Lewallyn was purchased from the Dodgers by the Minnesota Twins.
- January 31, 1978: Elías Sosa was purchased from the Dodgers by the Pittsburgh Pirates.

== Regular season ==
=== Season standings ===
NL West
Team	W	L	Pct.	GB	Home	Road
Los Angeles Dodgers	95	67	.586	—	54‍–‍27	41‍–‍40
Cincinnati Reds	92	69	.571	2½	49‍–‍31	43‍–‍38
San Francisco Giants	89	73	.549	6	50‍–‍31	39‍–‍42
San Diego Padres	84	78	.519	11	50‍–‍31	34‍–‍47
Houston Astros	74	88	.457	21	50‍–‍31	24‍–‍57
Atlanta Braves	69	93	.426	26	39‍–‍42	30‍–‍51

=== Record vs. opponents ===
1978 National League record Sources:
Team	ATL	CHC	CIN	HOU	LAD	MON	NYM	PHI	PIT	SD	SF	STL
Atlanta	—	5–7	6–12	8–10	5–13	5–7	6–6	8–4	2–10	8–10	11–7	5–7
Chicago	7–5	—	7–5	6–6	4–8	7–11	11–7	4–14	7–11	7–5	4–8	15–3
Cincinnati	12–6	5–7	—	11–7	9–9	8–4	7–5	7–5	4–7	9–9	12–6	8–4
Houston	10–8	6–6	7–11	—	7–11	6–6	7–5	6–6	4–8	8–10	6–12	7–5
Los Angeles	13–5	8–4	9–9	11–7	—	8–4	7–5	7–5	7–5	9–9	11–7	5–7
Montreal	7–5	11–7	4–8	6–6	4–8	—	8–10	9–9	7–11	6–6	5–7	9–9
New York	6–6	7–11	5–7	5–7	5–7	10–8	—	6–12	7–11	5–7	3–9	7–11
Philadelphia	4-8	14–4	5–7	6–6	5–7	9–9	12–6	—	11–7	8–4	6–6	10–8
Pittsburgh	10–2	11–7	7–4	8–4	5–7	11–7	11–7	7–11	—	5–7	4–8	9–9
San Diego	10–8	5–7	9–9	10–8	9–9	6–6	7–5	4–8	7–5	—	8–10	9–3
San Francisco	7–11	8–4	6–12	12–6	7–11	7–5	9–3	6–6	8–4	10–8	—	9–3
St. Louis	7–5	3–15	4–8	5–7	7–5	9–9	11–7	8–10	9–9	3–9	3–9	—

=== Opening day lineup ===
Opening Day starters
Name	Position
Davey Lopes	Second baseman
Bill Russell	Shortstop
Reggie Smith	Rightfielder
Ron Cey	Third baseman
Steve Garvey	First baseman
Dusty Baker	Leftfielder
Rick Monday	Centerfielder
Steve Yeager	Catcher
Don Sutton	Starting Pitcher

=== Notable transactions ===
- May 17, 1978: Glenn Burke was traded by the Dodgers to the Oakland Athletics for Billy North.
- May 20, 1978: Mike Garman was traded by the Dodgers to the Montreal Expos for Larry Landreth and Gerry Hannahs.
- July 1, 1978: The Dodgers traded players to be named later to the Houston Astros for Joe Ferguson and cash. The Dodgers completed the deal by sending Rafael Landestoy to the Astros on July 7 and Jeff Leonard to the Astros on September 11.

=== Roster ===
1978 Los Angeles Dodgers
Roster
Pitchers: 41 Bobby Castillo; 51 Terry Forster; 29 Mike Garman; 29 Gerry Hannahs; 46 Burt Hooton; 49 Charlie Hough; 25 Tommy John; 21 Dennis Lewallyn; 31 Doug Rau; 38 Lance Rautzhan; 36 Rick Rhoden; 48 Dave Stewart; 43 Rick Sutcliffe; 20 Don Sutton; 35 Bob Welch	Catchers: 13 Joe Ferguson; 9 Jerry Grote; 40 Brad Gulden; 5 Johnny Oates; 7 Steve Yeager; Infielders: 10 Ron Cey; 6 Steve Garvey; 57 Pedro Guerrero; 3 Enzo Hernández; 15 Davey Lopes; 23 Ted Martínez; 18 Bill Russell	Outfielders: 12 Dusty Baker; 3 Glenn Burke; 33 Vic Davalillo; 34 Lee Lacy; 3 Rudy Law; 16 Rick Monday; 4 Billy North; 17 Joe Simpson; 8 Reggie Smith; 52 Myron White; Other batters: 11 Manny Mota	Manager: 2 Tommy Lasorda; Coaches: 26 Red Adams; 54 Monty Basgall; 58 Mark Cresse; 19 Jim Gilliam; 28 Preston Gómez; 45 Jim Lefebvre

=== Notable events ===
On August 20, before a night game in New York against the New York Mets, Steve Garvey approached Don Sutton in the Dodgers' clubhouse over an article in The Washington Post in which Sutton was quoted as saying to Tom Boswell:

"All you ever hear about on our team is Steve Garvey, the all-American boy...well, the best player on this team for the past two years--and we all know it--is Reggie Smith. Reggie doesn't go out and publicize himself. He doesn't smile at the right people or say the right things. Reggie's not a façade or a Madison Avenue image. He's a real person."

Garvey and Sutton wrestled for two minutes in the clubhouse over Sutton's words and had to be pulled apart by teammates. Neither was seriously injured. Both had facial scratches and bruises and Garvey had a bloodshot left eye where it appeared a finger or thumb had been inserted by Sutton. Days later, Sutton publicly apologized for the incident, but not to Garvey personally.

== Game log ==
=== Regular season ===
Legend
	Dodgers win
	Dodgers loss
	Postponement
	Clinched division
**Bold**	Dodgers team member

1978 regular season game log: 95–67 (Home: 54–27; Away: 41–40)
April: 13–7 (Home: 6–3; Away: 7–4)

#	Date	Time (PT)	Opponent	Score	Win	Loss	Save	Time of Game	Attendance	Record	Box/ Streak

May: 14–13 (Home: 9–6; Away: 5–7)

#	Date	Time (PT)	Opponent	Score	Win	Loss	Save	Time of Game	Attendance	Record	Box/ Streak

June: 17–12 (Home: 9–4; Away: 8–8)

#	Date	Time (PT)	Opponent	Score	Win	Loss	Save	Time of Game	Attendance	Record	Box/ Streak
48	June 2	5:05 p.m. PDT	@ Phillies	2–4	Lonborg (5–3)	**Hooton** (4–5)	Garber (2)	1:49	42,347	27–21	L2
49	June 3	11:15 a.m. PDT	@ Phillies	1–5	McGraw (4–3)	**Forster** (1–1)	—	2:16	31,442	27–22	L3
50	June 4	10:35 a.m. PDT	@ Phillies	4–9	Kaat (2–0)	**John** (7–3)	—	2:10	42,066	27–23	L4
58	June 12	5:10 p.m. PDT	Phillies	6–5	**Hooton** (5–5)	Lonborg (5–4)	**Rautzhan** (1)	2:43	26,604	31–27	W3
59	June 13	7:35 p.m. PDT	Phillies	5–3	**Sutton** (5–6)	Lerch (3–6)	—	2:06	41,257	32–27	W4

July: 17–12 (Home: 9–4; Away: 8–8)

#	Date	Time (PT)	Opponent	Score	Win	Loss	Save	Time of Game	Attendance	Record	Box/ Streak
—	July 11	5:30 p.m. PDT	49th All-Star Game	American League vs. National League (San Diego Stadium, San Diego, California)							

August: 18–10 (Home: 10–4; Away: 8–6)

#	Date	Time (PT)	Opponent	Score	Win	Loss	Save	Time of Game	Attendance	Record	Box/ Streak
119	August 15	4:35 p.m. PDT	@ Phillies	5–4	**Rau** (12–7)	Ruthven (10–9)	**Rautzhan** (4)	2:07	38,386	69–50	W1
120	August 16	4:35 p.m. PDT	@ Phillies	5–2	**Welch** (5–0)	Kaat (6–5)	—	2:06	37,660	70–50	W2
121	August 17	4:35 p.m. PDT	@ Phillies	5–2	**Hooton** (13–8)	McGraw (8–4)	**Forster** (15)	2:13	36,325	71–50	W3
127	August 24	7:35 p.m. PDT	Phillies	5–4	**John** (15–9)	Brusstar (3–2)	**Hough** (7)	2:46	49,064	75–52	W3
128	August 25	7:35 p.m. PDT	Phillies	6–5	**Rautzhan** (2–0)	Reed (1–2)	—	2:38	46,548	76–52	W4
129	August 26	7:05 p.m. PDT	Phillies	1–3	Lerch (8–7)	**Rau** (12–8)	—	2:16	50,194	76–53	L1
130	August 27	1:05 p.m. PDT	Phillies	3–9	Christenson (10–12)	**Welch** (5–2)	—	2:50	43,065	76–54	L2

September: 16–12 (Home: 11–6; Away: 5–6)

#	Date	Time (PT)	Opponent	Score	Win	Loss	Save	Time of Game	Attendance	Record	Box/ Streak

October: 0–1 (Home: 0–0; Away: 0–1)

#	Date	Time (PT)	Opponent	Score	Win	Loss	Save	Time of Game	Attendance	Record	Box/ Streak

=== Detailed records ===
**National League**
Opponent	Home	Away	Total	Pct.	Runs scored	Runs allowed
**NL East**
Chicago Cubs	4–2	4–2	8–4	.667	61	46
Montreal Expos	5–1	3–3	8–4	.667	54	39
New York Mets	4–2	3–3	7–5	.583	57	50
Philadelphia Phillies	4–2	3–3	7–5	.583	48	55
Pittsburgh Pirates	5–1	2–4	7–5	.583	61	44
St. Louis Cardinals	3–3	2–4	5–7	.417	30	36
	**25–11**	**17–19**	**42–30**	**.583**	**311**	**270**
**NL West**
Atlanta Braves	6–3	7–2	13–5	.722	97	51
Cincinnati Reds	4–5	5–4	9–9	.500	80	76
Houston Astros	6–3	5–4	11–7	.611	82	63
**Los Angeles Dodgers**	—	—	—	—	—	—
San Diego Padres	7–2	2–7	9–9	.500	69	56
San Francisco Giants	6–3	5–4	11–7	.611	88	57
	**29–16**	**24–21**	**53–37**	**.589**	**416**	**303**

==== Month-by-Month ====
Month	Games	Won	Lost	Win %	RS	RA
April	20	13	7	0.650	112	73
May	27	14	13	0.519	133	111
June	29	17	12	0.586	125	108
July	29	17	12	0.586	120	100
August	28	18	10	0.643	110	83
September	28	16	12	0.571	124	94
October	1	0	1	0.000	3	4
Total	162	95	67	0.586	727	573

	Games	Won	Lost	Win %	RS	RA
Home	81	54	27	0.667	361	272
Road	81	41	40	0.506	366	301
Total	162	95	67	0.586	727	573

=== Composite Box ===
1978 Los Angeles Dodgers Inning–by–Inning Boxscore
Team	1	2	3	4	5	6	7	8	9	10	11	12	13	14	15	R	H	E
Opponents	64	76	64	84	67	55	47	49	58	4	2	0	0	0	3	573	1362	0
Dodgers	110	72	71	97	66	83	70	75	75	2	5	1	0	0	0	727	1435	140

=== Postseason Game log ===
1978 Postseason game log: 5–5 (Home: 3–2; Away: 2–3)
NL Championship Series: vs. Philadelphia Phillies 3–1 (Home: 1–1; Away: 2–0)

#	Date	Time (PT)	Opponent	Score	Win	Loss	Save	Time of Game	Attendance	Series	Box Streak
1	October 4	5:30 p.m. PDT	@ Phillies	9–5	**Welch** (1–0)	Christenson (0–1)	—	2:37	63,460	LAN 1–0	W1
2	October 5	11:30 a.m. PDT	@ Phillies	4–0	**John** (1–0)	Ruthven (0–1)	—	2:06	60,642	LAN 2–0	W2
3	October 6	5:30 p.m. PDT	Phillies	4–9	Carlton (1–0)	**Sutton** (0–1)	—	2:18	55,043	LAN 2–1	L1
4	October 7	1:30 p.m. PDT	Phillies	4–3 (10)	**Forster** (1–0)	McGraw (0–1)	—	2:53	55,124	LAN 3–1	W1

World Series: vs. New York Yankees 2–4 (Home: 2–1; Away: 0–3)

#	Date	Time (PT)	Opponent	Score	Win	Loss	Save	Time of Game	Attendance	Series	Box Streak
1	October 10	5:30 p.m. PDT	Yankees	11–5	**John** (1–0)	Figueroa (0–1)	—	2:48	55,997	LAN 1–0	W1
2	October 11	5:30 p.m. PDT	Yankees	4–3	**Hooton** (1–0)	Hunter (0–1)	**Welch** (1)	2:37	55,982	LAN 2–0	W2
3	October 13	5:30 p.m. PDT	@ Yankees	1–5	Guidry (1–0)	**Sutton** (0–1)	—	2:27	56,447	LAN 2–1	L1
4	October 14	12:30 p.m. PDT	@ Yankees	3–4 (10)	Gossage (1–0)	**Welch** (0–1)	—	3:17	56,445	TIE 2–2	L2
5	October 15	1:30 p.m. PDT	@ Yankees	2–12	Beattie (1–0)	**Hooton** (1–0)	—	2:56	56,448	NYA 3–2	L3
6	October 17	5:30 p.m. PDT	Yankees	2–7	Hunter (1–1)	**Sutton** (0–2)	—	2:34	55,985	NYA 4–2	L4

== Starting Lineups ==
=== Regular Season ===
==== Batting Order ====
1977 Regular Season Batting Order game log
April

#	Date	Opponent	1st	2nd	3rd	4th	5th	6th	7th	8th	9th

May

#	Date	Opponent	1st	2nd	3rd	4th	5th	6th	7th	8th	9th

June

#	Date	Opponent	1st	2nd	3rd	4th	5th	6th	7th	8th	9th
48	June 2	@ PHI									
49	June 3	@ PHI									
50	June 4	@ PHI									
58	June 12	PHI									
59	June 13	PHI									

July

#	Date	Opponent	1st	2nd	3rd	4th	5th	6th	7th	8th	9th

August

#	Date	Opponent	1st	2nd	3rd	4th	5th	6th	7th	8th	9th
119	August 15	@ PHI									
120	August 16	@ PHI									
121	August 17	@ PHI									
127	August 24	PHI									
128	August 25	PHI									
129	August 26	PHI									
130	August 27	PHI									

September

#	Date	Opponent	1st	2nd	3rd	4th	5th	6th	7th	8th	9th

October

#	Date	Opponent	1st	2nd	3rd	4th	5th	6th	7th	8th	9th

==== Defensive Lineup ====
1988 Regular Season Defensive Lineup game log
April

#	Date	Opponent	C	1B	2B	3B	SS	LF	CF	RF	P

May

#	Date	Opponent	C	1B	2B	3B	SS	LF	CF	RF	P

June

#	Date	Opponent	C	1B	2B	3B	SS	LF	CF	RF	P
48	June 2	@ PHI									
49	June 3	@ PHI									
50	June 4	@ PHI									
58	June 12	PHI									
59	June 13	PHI									

July

#	Date	Opponent	C	1B	2B	3B	SS	LF	CF	RF	P

August

#	Date	Opponent	C	1B	2B	3B	SS	LF	CF	RF	P
119	August 15	@ PHI									
120	August 16	@ PHI									
121	August 17	@ PHI									
127	August 24	PHI									
128	August 25	PHI									
129	August 26	PHI									
130	August 27	PHI									

September

#	Date	Opponent	C	1B	2B	3B	SS	LF	CF	RF	P

October

#	Date	Opponent	C	1B	2B	3B	SS	LF	CF	RF	P

=== Postseason ===
==== Batting Order ====
1978 Postseason Batting Order game log
NL Championship Series: vs. Philadelphia Phillies

#	Date	Opponent	1st	2nd	3rd	4th	5th	6th	7th	8th	9th
1	October 4	@ PHI									
2	October 5	@ PHI									
3	October 6	PHI									
4	October 7	PHI									

World Series: vs. New York Yankees

#	Date	Opponent	1st	2nd	3rd	4th	5th	6th	7th	8th	9th
1	October 10	NYY									
2	October 11	NYY									
3	October 13	@ NYY									
4	October 14	@ NYY									
5	October 15	@ NYY									
6	October 17	NYY									

==== Defensive Lineup ====
1978 Postseason Defensive Lineup game log
NL Championship Series: vs. Philadelphia Phillies

#	Date	Opponent	C	1B	2B	3B	SS	LF	CF	RF	P
1	October 4	@ PHI									
2	October 5	@ PHI									
3	October 6	PHI									
4	October 7	PHI									

World Series: vs. New York Yankees

#	Date	Opponent	C	1B	2B	3B	SS	LF	CF	RF	P
1	October 10	NYY									
2	October 11	NYY									
3	October 13	@ NYY									
4	October 14	@ NYY									
5	October 15	@ NYY									
6	October 17	NYY									

== Game Umpires ==
=== Regular Season ===
1978 Regular Season Umpire game log
April

#	Date	Opponent	HP	1B	2B	3B

May

#	Date	Opponent	HP	1B	2B	3B

June

#	Date	Opponent	HP	1B	2B	3B
48	June 2	@ PHI	#25; Charlie Williams	#19; Terry Tata	#13; Paul Pryor	#20; Ed Vargo (crew chief)
49	June 3	@ PHI	#19; Terry Tata	#13; Paul Pryor	#20; Ed Vargo (crew chief)	#25; Charlie Williams
50	June 4	@ PHI	#13; Paul Pryor	#20; Ed Vargo (crew chief)	#25; Charlie Williams	#19; Terry Tata
58	June 12	PHI	#10; John McSherry	#17; Paul Runge	#5; Bob Engel (crew chief)	#3; Jerry Dale
59	June 13	PHI	#17; Paul Runge	#5; Bob Engel (crew chief)	#3; Jerry Dale	#10; John McSherry

July

#	Date	Opponent	HP	1B	2B	3B

August

#	Date	Opponent	HP	1B	2B	3B
119	August 15	@ PHI	#21; Harry Wendelstedt	#16; Dutch Rennert	#23; Lee Weyer (crew chief)	#11; Ed Montague
120	August 16	@ PHI	#16; Dutch Rennert	#23; Lee Weyer (crew chief)	#11; Ed Montague	#21; Harry Wendelstedt
121	August 17	@ PHI	#23; Lee Weyer (crew chief)	#11; Ed Montague	#21; Harry Wendelstedt	#16; Dutch Rennert
127	August 24	PHI	#18; Dick Stello	#6; Bruce Froemming	#22; Joe West	#24; Bill Williams (crew chief)
128	August 25	PHI	Jim Scott (crew chief)	Boyd Mauer	Dale Williams	Charlie Lupo
129	August 26	PHI	#6; Bruce Froemming	#22; Joe West	#24; Bill Williams (crew chief)	#18; Dick Stello
130	August 27	PHI	#22; Joe West	#24; Bill Williams (crew chief)	#18; Dick Stello	#6; Bruce Froemming

September

#	Date	Opponent	HP	1B	2B	3B

October

#	Date	Opponent	HP	1B	2B	3B

=== Postseason ===
1978 Postseason Umpire game log
NL Championship Series: vs. Philadelphia Phillies

#	Date	Opponent	HP	1B	2B	3B	LF	RF
1	October 4	@ PHI	#10; John McSherry	#23; Lee Weyer	#1; Nick Colosi	#12; Andy Olsen	#4; Satch Davidson	#24; Bill Williams (crew chief)
2	October 5	@ PHI	#23; Lee Weyer	#1; Nick Colosi	#12; Andy Olsen	#4; Satch Davidson	#24; Bill Williams (crew chief)	#10; John McSherry
3	October 6	PHI	#12; Andy Olsen	#4; Satch Davidson	#24; Bill Williams (crew chief)	#10; John McSherry	#23; Lee Weyer	#1; Nick Colosi
4	October 7	PHI	#4; Satch Davidson	#24; Bill Williams (crew chief)	#10; John McSherry	#23; Lee Weyer	#1; Nick Colosi	#12; Andy Olsen

World Series: vs. New York Yankees

#	Date	Opponent	HP	1B	2B	3B	LF	RF
1	October 10	NYY	#20; Ed Vargo (NL) (crew chief)	Bill Haller (AL)	#9; John Kibler (NL)	Marty Springstead (AL)	#14; Frank Pulli (NL)	
2	October 11	NYY	Bill Haller (AL)	#9; John Kibler (NL)	Marty Springstead (AL)	#14; Frank Pulli (NL)		#20; Ed Vargo (NL) (crew chief)
3	October 13	@ NYY	#9; John Kibler (NL)	Marty Springstead (AL)	#14; Frank Pulli (NL)		#20; Ed Vargo (NL) (crew chief)	Bill Haller (AL)
4	October 14	@ NYY	Marty Springstead (AL)	#14; Frank Pulli (NL)		#20; Ed Vargo (NL) (crew chief)	Bill Haller (AL)	#9; John Kibler (NL)
5	October 15	@ NYY	#14; Frank Pulli (NL)		#20; Ed Vargo (NL) (crew chief)	Bill Haller (AL)	#9; John Kibler (NL)	Marty Springstead (AL)
6	October 17	NYY		#20; Ed Vargo (NL) (crew chief)	Bill Haller (AL)	#9; John Kibler (NL)	Marty Springstead (AL)	#14; Frank Pulli (NL)

== Player stats ==
= Indicates team leader

= Indicates league leader

=== Batting ===
==== Starters by position ====
Note: Pos = Position; G = Games played; AB = At bats; H = Hits; Avg. = Batting average; HR = Home runs; RBI = Runs batted in

Pos	Player	G	AB	H	Avg.	HR	RBI
C	Steve Yeager	94	228	44	.193	4	23
1B	Steve Garvey	162*	639	202	.316	21	113
2B	Davey Lopes	151	587	163	.278	17	58
3B	Ron Cey	159	555	150	.270	23	84
SS	Bill Russell	155	625	179	.286	3	46
LF	Dusty Baker	149	522	137	.262	11	66
CF	Bill North	110	304	71	.234	0	10
RF	Reggie Smith	128	447	132	.295	29	93

- Tied with Enos Cabell for league lead.

==== Other batters ====
Note: G = Games played; AB = At bats; H = Hits; Avg. = Batting average; HR = Home runs; RBI = Runs batted in

Player	G	AB	H	Avg.	HR	RBI
Rick Monday	119	342	87	.254	19	57
Lee Lacy	103	245	64	.261	13	40
Joe Ferguson	67	198	47	.237	7	28
Vic Davalillo	75	77	24	.312	1	11
Johnny Oates	40	75	23	.307	0	6
Jerry Grote	41	70	19	.271	0	9
Ted Martinez	54	55	14	.255	1	5
Manny Mota	37	33	10	.303	0	6
Glenn Burke	16	19	4	.211	0	2
Rudy Law	11	12	3	.250	0	1
Pedro Guerrero	5	8	5	.625	0	1
Joe Simpson	10	5	2	.400	0	1
Myron White	7	4	2	.500	0	1

=== Pitching ===
==== Starting pitchers ====
Note: G = Games pitched; IP = Innings pitched; W = Wins; L = Losses; ERA = Earned run average; SO = Strikeouts

Player	G	IP	W	L	ERA	SO
Don Sutton	34	238.1	15	11	3.55	154
Burt Hooton	32	236.0	19	10	2.71	104
Tommy John	33	213.0	17	10	3.30	124
Doug Rau	30	199.0	15	9	3.26	95

==== Other pitchers ====
Note: G = Games pitched; IP = Innings pitched; W = Wins; L = Losses; ERA = Earned run average; SO = Strikeouts

Player	G	IP	W	L	ERA	SO
Rick Rhoden	30	164.2	10	8	3.66	79
Bob Welch	23	111.1	7	4	2.02	66

==== Relief pitchers ====
Note: G = Games pitched; W = Wins; L = Losses; SV = Saves; ERA = Earned run average; SO = Strikeouts

Player	G	W	L	SV	ERA	SO
Terry Forster	47	5	4	22	1.93	46
Charlie Hough	55	5	5	7	3.28	66
Lance Rautzhan	43	2	1	4	2.93	25
Bobby Castillo	18	0	4	1	3.97	30
Mike Garman	10	0	1	0	4.41	5

== Postseason ==
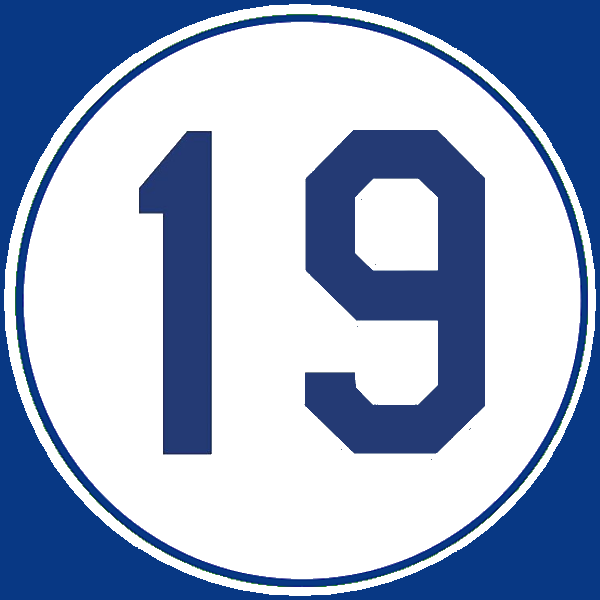
Jim Gilliam's number 19 was retired by the Los Angeles Dodgers in 1978.

=== 1978 National League Championship Series ===
The Dodgers defeated the Philadelphia Phillies 3 games to 1 in the NLCS.

==== Game 1 ====
October 4, Veterans Stadium

Team	1	2	3	4	5	6	7	8	9	R	H	E
Los Angeles	0	0	4	2	1	1	0	0	1	9	13	1
Philadelphia	0	1	0	0	3	0	0	0	1	5	12	1
W: Bob Welch (1-0) L: Larry Christenson (0-1) SV: None
HRs: PHI – Jerry Martin (1) LAD – Steve Garvey 2 (2) Davey Lopes (1) Steve Yeager (1)

==== Game 2 ====
October 5, Veterans Stadium

Team	1	2	3	4	5	6	7	8	9	R	H	E
Los Angeles	0	0	0	1	2	0	1	0	0	4	8	0
Philadelphia	0	0	0	0	0	0	0	0	0	0	4	0
W: Tommy John (1-0) L: Dick Ruthven (0-1) SV: None
HRs: PHI – None LAD – Davey Lopes (2)

==== Game 3 ====
October 6, Dodger Stadium

Team	1	2	3	4	5	6	7	8	9	R	H	E
Philadelphia	0	4	0	0	0	3	1	0	1	9	11	1
Los Angeles	0	1	2	0	0	0	0	1	0	4	8	2
W: Steve Carlton (1-0) L: Don Sutton (0-1) SV: None
HRs: PHI – Steve Carlton (1), Greg Luzinski (1); LAD – Steve Garvey (3)

==== Game 4 ====
October 7, Dodger Stadium

Team	1	2	3	4	5	6	7	8	9	10	R	H	E
Philadelphia	0	0	2	0	0	0	1	0	0	0	3	8	2
Los Angeles	0	1	0	1	0	1	0	0	0	1	4	13	0
W: Terry Forster (1-0) L: Tug McGraw (0-1) SV: None
HRs: PHI – Greg Luzinski (2), Bake McBride (1); LAD – Ron Cey (1) Steve Garvey (4)

=== 1978 World Series ===
The Dodgers again lost to the New York Yankees in the World Series.

AL New York Yankees (4) vs. NL Los Angeles Dodgers (2)

==== Game 1 ====
Tuesday, October 10, 1978, at Dodger Stadium in Los Angeles

Team	1	2	3	4	5	6	7	8	9	R	H	E
New York	0	0	0	0	0	0	3	2	0	5	9	1
Los Angeles	0	3	0	3	1	0	3	1	X	11	15	2
WP: Tommy John (1–0) LP: Ed Figueroa (0–1); Home runs: NYY: Reggie Jackson (1); LAD: Dusty Baker (1), Davey Lopes 2 (2)

==== Game 2 ====
Wednesday, October 11, 1978, at Dodger Stadium in Los Angeles

Team	1	2	3	4	5	6	7	8	9	R	H	E
New York	0	0	2	0	0	0	1	0	0	3	11	0
Los Angeles	0	0	0	1	0	3	0	0	X	4	7	0
WP: Burt Hooton (1–0) LP: Catfish Hunter (0–1) Sv: Bob Welch (1); Home runs: NYY: None; LAD: Ron Cey (1)

==== Game 3 ====
Friday, October 13, 1978, at Yankee Stadium in Bronx, New York

Team	1	2	3	4	5	6	7	8	9	R	H	E
Los Angeles	0	0	1	0	0	0	0	0	0	1	8	0
New York	1	1	0	0	0	0	3	0	X	5	10	1
WP: Ron Guidry (1–0) LP: Don Sutton (0–1); Home runs: LAD: None; NYY: Roy White (1)

==== Game 4 ====
Saturday, October 14, 1978, at Yankee Stadium in Bronx, New York

Team	1	2	3	4	5	6	7	8	9	10	R	H	E
Los Angeles	0	0	0	0	3	0	0	0	0	0	3	6	1
New York	0	0	0	0	0	2	0	1	0	1	4	9	0
WP: Goose Gossage (1–0) LP: Bob Welch (0–1); Home runs: LAD: Reggie Smith (1); NYY: None

==== Game 5 ====
Sunday, October 15, 1978, at Yankee Stadium in Bronx, New York

Team	1	2	3	4	5	6	7	8	9	R	H	E
Los Angeles	1	0	1	0	0	0	0	0	0	2	9	3
New York	0	0	4	3	0	0	4	1	X	12	18	0
WP: Jim Beattie (1–0) LP: Burt Hooton (1–1)

==== Game 6 ====
Tuesday, October 17, 1978, at Dodger Stadium in Los Angeles

Team	1	2	3	4	5	6	7	8	9	R	H	E
New York	0	3	0	0	0	2	2	0	0	7	11	0
Los Angeles	1	0	1	0	0	0	0	0	0	2	7	1
WP: Catfish Hunter (1–1) LP: Don Sutton (0–2); Home runs: NYY: Reggie Jackson (2); LAD: Davey Lopes (3)

== Awards and honors ==
- Gold Glove Awards
  - Davey Lopes
- NL Player of the Month
  - Rick Monday (April 1978)
- NL Player of the Week
  - Rick Monday (Apr. 17–23)
  - Steve Garvey (Aug. 14–20)

=== All-Stars ===
- 1978 Major League Baseball All-Star Game
  - Steve Garvey, starter, first base
  - Rick Monday, starter, outfield
  - Ron Cey, reserve
  - Tommy John, reserve
  - Davey Lopes, reserve
  - Reggie Smith, reserve
- Major League Baseball All-Star Game MVP Award
  - Steve Garvey
- TSN National League All-Star
  - Davey Lopes
  - Steve Garvey

=== Postseason ===
- NLCS Most Valuable Player
  - Steve Garvey

== Farm system ==
Level	Team	League	Manager
**AAA**	**Albuquerque Dukes**	**Pacific Coast League**	**Del Crandall**
AA	San Antonio Dodgers	Texas League	Don LeJohn
A	Lodi Dodgers	California League	Stan Wasiak
A	Clinton Dodgers	Midwest League	Dick McLaughlin
Rookie	Lethbridge Dodgers	Pioneer League	Jim Lefebvre

Teams in BOLD won League Championships

== Major League Baseball draft ==
The Dodgers drafted 35 players in the June draft and 12 in the January draft. Of those, seven players would eventually play in the Major Leagues.

The Dodgers did not have a first round pick this year in the June draft as their pick was given to the Pittsburgh Pirates as compensation for their signing of free agent pitcher Terry Forster. In the second round, they selected SS Clay Smith from Northwest Classen High School in Oklahoma City, Oklahoma. Smith played in the Dodgers farm system through 1981, hitting .271 in 277 games in the rookie leagues and class-A before he was released.

This draft netted the Dodgers two key players for their championship teams of the 1980s. They drafted Mike Marshall in the 6th round and Steve Sax in the 9th. Marshall would hit 148 homers in 11 seasons and made the All-Star team in 1984 while playing both the outfield and first base. Sax played 14 seasons (8 of them with the Dodgers) and hit .281 with 444 steals. The Dodgers starting second baseman for most of the 1980s, he was the 1982 NL Rookie of the Year and a five time All-Star.

1978 draft picks

=== January draft ===
Round	Name	Position	School	Signed	Career span	Highest level
1	Brian Holton	RHP	Louisburg College	Yes	1978–1992	**MLB**
2	Greg Schultz	SS	Sacramento City College	Yes	1978–1985	AAA
3	Brad Patterson	RHP	Umpqua Community College	No		
4	Mathew Reeves	LHP	Sacramento City College	Yes	1978–1982	A
5	Bryan Little	SS	Louisburg College	No; Expos-1980	1980–1988	**MLB**
6	Jimmy Boring	RHP	Georgia Perimeter College	No		
7	Larry Pittman	1B	Abraham Baldwin Agricultural College	No; Mets-1979	1979–1981	A
9	Anthony Murdaugh	RHP	University of South Carolina	No		
9	Peter Zorich	RHP	Lower Columbia College	No		

==== January secondary phase ====
Round	Name	Position	School	Signed	Career span	Highest level
1	Russell McDonald	RHP	DeAnza College	Yes	1978–1984	AAA
2	Daniel Sijer	LHP	Shoreline Community College	No; Padres-1979	1979–1980	A
3	Stephen Smith	RHP	Gulf Coast Community College	No		

=== June draft ===
Round	Name	Position	School	Signed	Career span	Highest level
2	Clay Smith	SS	Northwest Classen High School	Yes	1978–1981	A
3	Augie Ruiz	LHP	University of Miami	Yes	1978–1984	AAA
4	Glenn Gallagher	LHP	Peekskill High School	No; Blue Jays-1981	1981–1984	AA
5	John Robbins	OF	Lockhart High School	Yes	1978–1980	A
6	Mike Marshall	1B	Buffalo Grove High School	Yes	1978–1999	**MLB**
7	Mark Nipp	RHP	University of Oklahoma	Yes	1978–1981	AAA
8	William Swiacki	RHP	Amherst College	Yes	1978–1982	AAA
9	Steve Sax	SS	Marshall High School	Yes	1978–1994	**MLB**
10	Rodney Kemp	OF	San Jose State University	Yes	1978–1980	A
11	John Malkin	C	Cardinal Spellman High School	Yes	1978–1985	AAA
12	Francis Wilczewski	RHP	Independence High School	Yes	1978–1979	A
13	Melvin Meadows	OF	White Oak High School	Yes	1979	Rookie
14	Jeffrey Kopjo	OF	Lyons Township High School	Yes	1978–1979	Rookie
15	Stephen Maples	C	Skyline High School	Yes	1978–1980	A
16	Brian Hayes	LHP	University of Southern California	Yes	1978–1980	AA
17	Joseph Pocoroba	SS	Crespi Carmelite High School	Yes	1978–1979	Rookie
18	Eric Bullock	OF	South Gate High School	No; Astros-1981	1981–1995	**MLB**
19	Gary Weiss	IF	University of Houston	Yes	1978–1981	**MLB**
20	Chris Iwasaki	OF	Reedley College	No		
21	Dave LaPoint	RHP	Monadnock Regional High School	No		
22	Thomas Banducci	RHP	William Floyd High School	Yes	1978	Rookie
23	Chris Gandy	1B	University of California, Riverside	Yes	1978–1980	A
24	Warren Reeh	LHP		Yes	1978	Rookie
25	William Murray	SS	Tamalpais High School	No; Dodgers-1981	1981	A
26	David Albrecht	LHP	Appleton East High School	No		
27	James Taylor	C	University of South Carolina	No		
28	Robert White	LHP	Lake Mills High School	Yes	1978–1980	A
29	Joseph Herbert	OF	Columbia High School	Yes	1978	Rookie
30	Kevin Patten	OF	Miami University of Ohio	No; Braves-1979	1979	Rookie
31	Kent Johnson	RHP	Muncie Northside High School	Yes	1978–1979	A
32	Daniel Forer	LHP	Iowa Western Community College	No; Dodgers-1981	1981	A
33	Michael Vienne	RHP	St. Mary's High School	No		
34	Mark Pirruccello	C	Servite High School	No; Royals-1982	1982–1984	AA

==== June secondary phase ====
Round	Name	Position	School	Signed	Career span	Highest level
1	Dann Bilardello	C	Cabrillo College	Yes	1978–1994	**MLB**
2	Keith Schrimsher	RHP	University of South Florida	No; Reds-1979	1979–1980	A
