= 1978 National League Championship Series =

10th edition of Major League Baseball's National League Championship Series

| Team (Wins) | Managers | Season |
|---|---|---|
| Los Angeles Dodgers (3) | Tommy Lasorda | 95–67, .586, GA: 2½ |
| Philadelphia Phillies (1) | Danny Ozark | 90–72, .556, GA: 1½ |
- Dates: October 4–7
- MVP: Steve Garvey (Los Angeles)
- Umpires: Lee Weyer (crew chief); Nick Colosi; Andy Olsen; Satch Davidson; Billy Williams; John McSherry

Broadcast
- Television: ABC; KTTV (LAD); WPHL-TV (PHI)
- TV announcers: ABC: Al Michaels, Don Drysdale and Johnny Bench; KTTV: Vin Scully, Jerry Doggett and Ross Porter; WPHL-TV: Harry Kalas, Andy Musser and Richie Ashburn
- Radio: CBS
- Radio announcers: Ralph Kiner and Jerry Coleman

The 1978 National League Championship Series was a best-of-five matchup in Major League Baseball’s 1978 postseason between the West Division champion Los Angeles Dodgers and the East Division champion Philadelphia Phillies. It was the tenth ever NLCS and a rematch of the 1977 series between the same teams. The Dodgers beat the Phillies three games to one before they lost the World Series to the New York Yankees.

This was the last time the Dodgers defeated the Phillies in the postseason until 2025.

== Summary ==
=== Los Angeles Dodgers vs. Philadelphia Phillies ===
Los Angeles won the series, 3–1.

| Game | Date | Score | Location | Time | Attendance |
|---|---|---|---|---|---|
| 1 | October 4 | Los Angeles Dodgers – 9, Philadelphia Phillies – 5 | Veterans Stadium | 2:37 | 63,460 |
| 2 | October 5 | Los Angeles Dodgers – 4, Philadelphia Phillies – 0 | Veterans Stadium | 2:06 | 60,642 |
| 3 | October 6 | Philadelphia Phillies – 9, Los Angeles Dodgers – 4 | Dodger Stadium | 2:18 | 55,043 |
| 4 | October 7 | Philadelphia Phillies – 3, Los Angeles Dodgers – 4 (10) | Dodger Stadium | 2:53 | 55,124 |

== Game summaries ==
=== Game 1 ===
October 4, 1978 8:30 pm (ET) at Veterans Stadium in Philadelphia, Pennsylvania 57 °F (14 °C), cloudy
| Team | 1 | 2 | 3 | 4 | 5 | 6 | 7 | 8 | 9 | R | H | E |
|---|---|---|---|---|---|---|---|---|---|---|---|---|
| Los Angeles | 0 | 0 | 4 | 2 | 1 | 1 | 0 | 0 | 1 | 9 | 13 | 1 |
| Philadelphia | 0 | 1 | 0 | 0 | 3 | 0 | 0 | 0 | 1 | 5 | 12 | 1 |
WP: Bob Welch (1–0) LP: Larry Christenson (0–1); Home runs: LAD: Steve Garvey 2 (2), Davey Lopes (1), Steve Yeager (1); PHI: Jerry Martin (1)

Because Phillies ace Steve Carlton started the NL East-clinching game a few days earlier, he was not available for the start of the series, leaving the first game to Larry Christenson. The Phillies scored the first run in the bottom of the second after Greg Luzinski hit a leadoff triple and was driven in by a sacrifice fly from Mike Schmidt. The Phillies quickly lost that lead when a double and an error by third baseman Schmidt put runners on first and second with one out for the Dodgers in the third. The Dodgers capitalized on this opportunity with an RBI single by Reggie Smith and a three run home run by Steve Garvey. The Dodgers extended their 4–1 lead in the next two innings with Davey Lopes' two-run homer in the fourth and Garvey's triple in the fifth. The Dodgers entered the bottom of the fifth with a 7–1 lead where the Phillies loaded the bases with one out and Garry Maddox drove in two runs with a single. One out later, Richie Hebner's RBI single made it 7–4 Dodgers. Steve Yeager homered off of Rawly Eastwick in the sixth to give the Dodgers the 8–4 lead. The Dodgers added another run in the ninth when Garvey hit his second homer of the night, this time off of Tug McGraw. The Phillies attempted a comeback in the bottom of the ninth with a home run from Jerry Martin, but rookie Bob Welch was able to strike out Maddox looking to end the game and earn the win as the Dodgers took a 1–0 series lead.

=== Game 2 ===
October 5, 1978 2:30 pm (ET) at Veterans Stadium in Philadelphia, Pennsylvania 65 °F (18 °C), cloudy
| Team | 1 | 2 | 3 | 4 | 5 | 6 | 7 | 8 | 9 | R | H | E |
|---|---|---|---|---|---|---|---|---|---|---|---|---|
| Los Angeles | 0 | 0 | 0 | 1 | 2 | 0 | 1 | 0 | 0 | 4 | 8 | 0 |
| Philadelphia | 0 | 0 | 0 | 0 | 0 | 0 | 0 | 0 | 0 | 0 | 4 | 0 |
WP: Tommy John (1–0) LP: Dick Ruthven (0–1); Home runs: LAD: Davey Lopes (2); PHI: None

The Dodgers won their second straight road game in this series with a complete-game, four-hit shutout by Tommy John. Davey Lopes's home run leading off the fourth off of Dick Ruthven made it 1–0 Dodgers. Dusty Baker doubled to lead off the next inning, then scored on Steve Yeager's one-out single. After stealing second, Yeager scored on Lopes's single to make it 3–0 Dodgers. Lopes capped the scoring in the seventh with an RBI triple off of Ron Reed as the Dodgers took a 2–0 series lead to Los Angeles with the 4–0 win. This would be the last postseason win for the Dodgers in Philadelphia until Game 1 of the 2025 NLDS.

=== Game 3 ===
October 6, 1978 5:30 pm (PT) at Dodger Stadium in Los Angeles, California 68 °F (20 °C), cloudy
| Team | 1 | 2 | 3 | 4 | 5 | 6 | 7 | 8 | 9 | R | H | E |
|---|---|---|---|---|---|---|---|---|---|---|---|---|
| Philadelphia | 0 | 4 | 0 | 0 | 0 | 3 | 1 | 0 | 1 | 9 | 11 | 1 |
| Los Angeles | 0 | 1 | 2 | 0 | 0 | 0 | 0 | 1 | 0 | 4 | 8 | 2 |
WP: Steve Carlton (1–0) LP: Don Sutton (0–1); Home runs: PHI: Steve Carlton (1), Greg Luzinski (1); LAD: Steve Garvey (3)

With Steve Carlton finally available to pitch, the Phillies cut the series deficit to 2–1 at Dodger Stadium, when Carlton pitched a complete game. In the top of the second with two outs, Mike Schmidt doubled and Tim McCarver drew a walk from Don Sutton. Now with two runners on base, Ted Sizemore drove in one run with an RBI single. The next batter, starting pitcher Steve Carlton, hit a three run home run, giving himself some significant run support before his return to the mound. In the bottom of the second, with two runners on base, Bill Russell hit an RBI ground rule double, making the score 4–1 in the Phillies' favor. The next inning, Reggie Smith singled with two outs and scored on Steve Garvey's double. Then Roy Cey's RBI single made it 4–3 Phillies. In the top of the sixth inning, after an error and single put runners on first and second, Carlton gave himself more run support with a two-run single. This extended the Phillies' lead to 6–3. After a pitching change brought in Lance Rautzhan, Jerry Martin drove Carlton in with a double. In the seventh, Tim McCarver's RBI groundout with the bases loaded made it 8–3 Phillies. The bottom of the eighth tightened the game with a solo shot from Garvey, making it 8–4. In the top of the ninth, the Phillies extended their lead with Greg Luzinski's home run off of Charlie Hough. The Dodgers were unable to come back in the bottom of the ninth, allowing Carlton to complete the game and earn the win for the Phillies.

=== Game 4 ===
October 7, 1978 1:30 pm (PT) at Dodger Stadium in Los Angeles, California 75 °F (24 °C), sunny
| Team | 1 | 2 | 3 | 4 | 5 | 6 | 7 | 8 | 9 | 10 | R | H | E |
|---|---|---|---|---|---|---|---|---|---|---|---|---|---|
| Philadelphia | 0 | 0 | 2 | 0 | 0 | 0 | 1 | 0 | 0 | 0 | 3 | 8 | 2 |
| Los Angeles | 0 | 1 | 0 | 1 | 0 | 1 | 0 | 0 | 0 | 1 | 4 | 13 | 0 |
WP: Terry Forster (1–0) LP: Tug McGraw (0–1); Home runs: PHI: Greg Luzinski (2), Bake McBride (1); LAD: Ron Cey (1), Steve Garvey (4)

Facing elimination once again in Game 4, the Phillies loaded the bases with nobody out in the first inning but could not score. The Dodgers then struck first in the second inning on a double by Ron Cey and an RBI single by Dusty Baker, the first of four hits he would collect in this game. Greg Luzinski put the Phillies back on top with a two-run homer in the third.

Cey tied it in the fourth with a home run, then Steve Garvey gave the Dodgers the lead with a homer, his fourth of the series, in the sixth. The home run was also his fifth extra base hit of the Series and tied Bob Robertson's 1971 NLCS records for home runs and extra base hits in a League Championship Series. But, Bake McBride tied it once again for the Phillies in the seventh with a home run of his own.

In the bottom of the tenth, Tug McGraw retired the first two Dodger batters, but then surrendered a walk to Cey. Baker then hit a soft line drive to center field. Garry Maddox (who by 1978 had won the fourth of his eight gold gloves) got a late break on the ball, appeared to recover in time, but dropped the ball. Now, Cey was on second and Baker on first. The next batter, Bill Russell, lined a base hit to center. With Cey running because there were two out, Maddox faced a do or die play to get the ball and fire home; Maddox charged, but the ball skipped past him, enabling Cey to score the winning run.

== Composite box ==
1978 NLCS (3–1): Los Angeles Dodgers over Philadelphia Phillies

| Team | 1 | 2 | 3 | 4 | 5 | 6 | 7 | 8 | 9 | 10 | R | H | E |
|---|---|---|---|---|---|---|---|---|---|---|---|---|---|
| Los Angeles Dodgers | 0 | 2 | 6 | 4 | 3 | 2 | 1 | 1 | 1 | 1 | 21 | 42 | 3 |
| Philadelphia Phillies | 0 | 5 | 2 | 0 | 3 | 3 | 2 | 0 | 2 | 0 | 17 | 35 | 4 |
Total attendance: 234,269 Average attendance: 58,567

== Aftermath ==
After being let go in 1979, Phillies manager Danny Ozark won a World Series in 1981 with the Dodgers as their third base coach (Ozark was friends with Dodgers manager Tommy Lasorda from their time in the organization together in the 1960s through early 1970s). Ozark was fired during August of the 1979 season after failing to meet expectations after the team signed future hits leader Pete Rose. Ozark was replaced by Dallas Green, who was at the helm in 1980, when the Phillies won their first World Series.

The Dodgers and Phillies faced each other in the NLDS in 2025; longtime fans noted that the 2025 series was a mirror image of the 1978 NLCS between both teams, as just like in that series, the Dodgers stole the first two games on the road in Philadelphia, then the Phillies routed the Dodgers in Game 3 in Los Angeles, and then the Dodgers won Game 4 in extra innings on a misplayed ball by the Phillies.

Prior to the 2025 NLDS, the Phillies won the last three postseason meetings against the Dodgers, which were the NLCS in 1983, 2008, and 2009. In the 2008–2009 NLCS, key players from the 1970s incarnation of the rivalry, Larry Bowa and Davey Lopes, would become coaches, but for the opposing team; Bowa was the bench coach for the Dodgers, while Lopes coached first base for the Phillies (Bowa was the Phillies manager from 2001-2004 and Lopes coached first base for the Dodgers from 2011–2015 as well). Also becoming a coach and manager was Dusty Baker, who won his first World Series as manager after 25 years coaching, against the Phillies in the 2022 World Series as the Houston Astros manager.

Over the year, losing three straight conference championships became an unfortunate theme for Philadelphia and Pennsylvania sports. The 1990–1992 cross-state Pittsburgh Pirates later joined 1976–1978 Phillies as the only teams to lose three consecutive League Championship Series. In the NFL, the Philadelphia Eagles would also lose three NFC Championship Games in a row from 2001–2003.
