= Brian Doyle (baseball) =

American baseball player (born 1954)

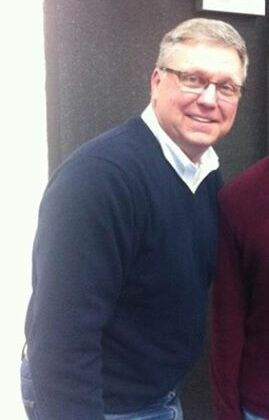
- Doyle at an autograph signing in 2013
- Infielder
- Born: January 26, 1954 (age 72); Glasgow, Kentucky, U.S.
- Batted: Left Threw: Right

MLB debut
- April 30, 1978, for the New York Yankees

Last MLB appearance
- May 24, 1981, for the Oakland Athletics

MLB statistics
- Batting average: .161
- Home runs: 1
- Runs batted in: 13
- Stats at Baseball Reference

Teams
- New York Yankees (1978–1980); Oakland Athletics (1981)

Career highlights and awards
- World Series champion (1978)

Brian Reed Doyle (born January 26, 1954) is an American former Major League Baseball infielder. Although a reserve for most of his career, Doyle starred in the 1978 World Series for the World Champion New York Yankees who beat the Los Angeles Dodgers.

== Texas Rangers ==
Doyle was drafted by the Texas Rangers in the fourth round of the 1972 Major League Baseball draft out of Caverna High School in Horse Cave, Kentucky. He batted .259 with ten home runs and 132 runs batted in over five seasons in the Rangers' farm system when he was traded to the Yankees along with Greg Pryor in exchange for Sandy Alomar Sr.

== New York Yankees ==
After spending the 1977 season in triple A with the Syracuse Chiefs, Doyle split the 1978 season between the Yankees and Tacoma Yankees. Doyle wasn't originally expected to be part of the Yankees' post season roster, however, All-Star second baseman Willie Randolph had been dealing with cartilage problems in his left knee all season. A hamstring injury on September 29 sidelined him for the post season. Doyle was added in his place.

Doyle went 2-for-5 with his first career RBI in game one of the 1978 American League Championship Series against the Kansas City Royals. With left handers going in games two and three, manager Bob Lemon went with right handed batting Fred Stanley at second. Doyle started the final game, and walked once in three plate appearances.

== 1978 World Series ==
Doyle took the field as a late inning defensive replacement, but for the most part, sat out game one of the World Series with left hander Tommy John pitching. He went 1-for-3 in game two, and hitless in four at bats in game three.

In game five, Doyle went 3-for-5 with two runs scored in the Yankees' 12-2 dismantling of the Dodgers. After which, he was featured on the October 23, 1978 cover of Sports Illustrated.

In game six, Doyle came to bat in the second inning with runners on first and second, and the Yankees trailing 1–0. He doubled to drive in the first Yankee run. It was his first career extra base hit. He drove in a second run in the sixth.

For the 1978 World Series Champion New York Yankees, Doyle batted a team leading .438 with seven hits in sixteen at bats, one double, four runs scored and two RBIs. In the post season overall, he had nine hits in 23 at bats. Compared to the 1978 regular season, in which he only had ten hits (.192 avg.) and six runs scored with no RBIs.

He finished second to Bucky Dent in World Series Most Valuable Player Award balloting. Batting behind Doyle, the number nine hitter batted .417 with seven RBIs. The number eight and nine slots in the Yankees' batting order batted .400 with seven runs scored and nine RBIs.

== Oakland A's ==
Regardless of his post season heroics, Doyle saw little action over the remainder of his Yankees career. He appeared in 54 games in the 1979 and 1980 seasons combined, and batted .159 with ten RBIs. On June 29, 1980, he hit his only career home run off the Cleveland Indians' Len Barker.

On November 3, 1980, the Yankees traded Stanley and a player to be named later to the Oakland Athletics for pitcher Mike Morgan. The Yankees sent Doyle to the A's to complete the deal, but Commissioner of Baseball Bowie Kuhn voided the transfer because Doyle was assigned to the Columbus Clippers at the time. On December 8, the A's selected Doyle in the Rule 5 draft.

He began the 1981 season in a lefty/righty platoon with Shooty Babitt at second base before being sidelined for three weeks by a hamstring injury seven games into the season. He returned in early May, and was batting only .125 on the season when Toronto Blue Jays designated hitter Otto Velez separated Doyle's shoulder attempting to break up a double play. He played 21 games in triple A, but never returned to the majors. He split the 1982 season between the Blue Jays' and Indians' International League affiliates before going into coaching for 1983.

== Personal ==
He and his wife, Connie, have been married since 1974. They have two children, Kirk and Kristin.

His twin brother, Blake, played minor league ball before becoming a major league coach. His brother, Denny (1944–2022), also played in the major leagues. In 1978, the Doyle brothers founded Doyle Baseball, a baseball school.

In 1983, Doyle managed the New York–Penn League Batavia Trojans to a 32–43 record. In the 1990s, Doyle was diagnosed with leukemia, and was later on diagnosed with Parkinson's Disease in 2015.
