= 1978 Major League Baseball season =

1978 MLB season
- League: American League (AL); National League (NL)
- Sport: Baseball
- Duration: Regular season: April 5 – October 2, 1978 (AL); April 6 – October 1, 1978 (NL); Postseason: October 3–17, 1978
- Games: 162
- Teams: 26 (14 AL, 12 NL)
- TV partner(s): ABC, NBC

Draft
- Top draft pick: Bob Horner
- Picked by: Atlanta Braves

Regular season
- Season MVP: AL: Jim Rice (BOS); NL: Dave Parker (PIT)

Postseason
- AL champions: New York Yankees
- AL runners-up: Kansas City Royals
- NL champions: Los Angeles Dodgers
- NL runners-up: Philadelphia Phillies

World Series
- Champions: New York Yankees
- Runners-up: Los Angeles Dodgers
- World Series MVP: Bucky Dent (NYY)

MLB seasons
- ← 1977 1979 →

Locations of teams for the 1977–1981 American League seasons
West East
Locations of teams for the 1977–1992 National League seasons
West East

The 1978 major league baseball season began on April 5 while the regular season ended on October 2. The postseason began on October 3. In the 10th iteration of this World Series matchup, the 75th World Series then began on October 10 and concluded on October 17 with the New York Yankees of the American League defeating the Los Angeles Dodgers of the National League, four games to two, to win their 22nd title in franchise history, winning back-to-back World Series.

The 49th All-Star Game was held on July 11 at San Diego Stadium, home of the San Diego Padres. The National League won, 7–3, and was the seventh win in what would be an 11-game win streak that lasted until 1983.

The Yankees overcame clubhouse turmoil, a mid-season managerial change, and a 14-game mid-July deficit in the American League East en route to the championship. All four teams that made the playoffs in 1977 returned for this postseason; none of the four returned to the postseason in 1979.

== Schedule ==
The 1978 schedule consisted of 162 games for all 14 teams in the American League and 12 teams in the National League. Both leagues saw different schedule formats, as they had since 1977. The American League was split into two seven-team divisions. Each team was scheduled to play 15 games against their six division rivals, totaling 90 games, and 10 games against five opponents and 11 games against two opponents, totaling 72 interdivision games. This format would be used until the following season. Meanwhile, the National League was split into two six-team divisions. Each team was scheduled to play 18 games against their five division rivals, totaling 90 games, and 12 games against six interdivision opponents, totaling 72 games. This continued the format put in place since the 1969 and would continue to be the format in use until 1993.

Opening Day took place on April 6, featuring four teams. The final day of the scheduled regular season was on October 1, featuring all 26 teams. Due to the New York Yankees and Boston Red Sox finishing with the same record of 99–63, a tiebreaker game was scheduled, to be considered an extension of the regular season, on October 2. The American League Championship Series took place between October 3 and October 7, while the National League Championship Series took place between October 4 and October 7. The World Series took place between October 10 and October 17.

== Rule changes ==
The 1978 season saw the following rule changes:

- Rules regarding the designated hitter in interleague play was addressed:
  - The designated hitter would be used for both teams in even-number years of the World Series.
  - All-Star games would feature the designated hitter if both leagues agree.
  - In exhibition games, the designated hitter would be used or not used depending on the home team.
- To reduce instances of brushback pitches or "head-hunting", their ability to give warnings to each team was expanded, as in addition to the perpetrating pitcher and manager, the manager must now warn the opposing manager as well. For teams with a combative history, teams can be warned about intentional hit by pitches prior to the game.

== Teams ==
League	Division	Team	City	Ballpark	Capacity	Manager
American League	East	Baltimore Orioles	Baltimore, Maryland	Baltimore Memorial Stadium	53,208	Earl Weaver
American League	East	Boston Red Sox	Boston, Massachusetts	Fenway Park	33,368	Don Zimmer
American League	East	Cleveland Indians	Cleveland, Ohio	Cleveland Stadium	74,483	Jeff Torborg
American League	East	Detroit Tigers	Detroit, Michigan	Tiger Stadium	52,806	Ralph Houk
American League	East	Milwaukee Brewers	Milwaukee, Wisconsin	Milwaukee County Stadium	53,192	George Bamberger
American League	East	New York Yankees	New York, New York	Yankee Stadium	57,145	Billy Martin
American League	East	New York Yankees	New York, New York	Yankee Stadium	57,145	Dick Howser
American League	East	New York Yankees	New York, New York	Yankee Stadium	57,145	Bob Lemon
American League	East	Toronto Blue Jays	Toronto, Ontario	Exhibition Stadium	43,737	Roy Hartsfield
American League	West	California Angels	Anaheim, California	Anaheim Stadium	43,500	Dave Garcia
American League	West	California Angels	Anaheim, California	Anaheim Stadium	43,500	Jim Fregosi
American League	West	Chicago White Sox	Chicago, Illinois	Comiskey Park	44,492	Bob Lemon
American League	West	Chicago White Sox	Chicago, Illinois	Comiskey Park	44,492	Larry Doby
American League	West	Kansas City Royals	Kansas City, Missouri	Royals Stadium	40,613	Whitey Herzog
American League	West	Minnesota Twins	Bloomington, Minnesota	Metropolitan Stadium	45,919	Gene Mauch
American League	West	Oakland Athletics	Oakland, California	Oakland–Alameda County Coliseum	50,000	Bobby Winkles
American League	West	Oakland Athletics	Oakland, California	Oakland–Alameda County Coliseum	50,000	Jack McKeon
American League	West	Seattle Mariners	Seattle, Washington	Kingdome	59,059	Darrell Johnson
American League	West	Texas Rangers	Arlington, Texas	Arlington Stadium	41,284	Billy Hunter
American League	West	Texas Rangers	Arlington, Texas	Arlington Stadium	41,284	Pat Corrales
National League	East	Chicago Cubs	Chicago, Illinois	Wrigley Field	37,702	Herman Franks
National League	East	Montreal Expos	Montreal, Quebec	Olympic Stadium	59,149	Dick Williams
National League	East	New York Mets	New York, New York	Shea Stadium	55,300	Joe Torre
National League	East	Philadelphia Phillies	Philadelphia, Pennsylvania	Veterans Stadium	62,382	Danny Ozark
National League	East	Pittsburgh Pirates	Pittsburgh, Pennsylvania	Three Rivers Stadium	58,722	Chuck Tanner
National League	East	St. Louis Cardinals	St. Louis, Missouri	Civic Center Busch Memorial Stadium	53,138	Vern Rapp
National League	East	St. Louis Cardinals	St. Louis, Missouri	Civic Center Busch Memorial Stadium	53,138	Jack Krol
National League	East	St. Louis Cardinals	St. Louis, Missouri	Civic Center Busch Memorial Stadium	53,138	Ken Boyer
National League	West	Atlanta Braves	Atlanta, Georgia	Atlanta–Fulton County Stadium	51,556	Bobby Cox
National League	West	Cincinnati Reds	Cincinnati, Ohio	Riverfront Stadium	52,953	Sparky Anderson
National League	West	Houston Astros	Houston, Texas	Houston Astrodome	47,000	Bill Virdon
National League	West	Los Angeles Dodgers	Los Angeles, California	Dodger Stadium	56,000	Tommy Lasorda
National League	West	San Diego Padres	San Diego, California	San Diego Stadium	50,000	Roger Craig
National League	West	San Francisco Giants	San Francisco, California	Candlestick Park	58,945	Joe Altobelli

== Standings ==
=== American League ===
AL East
Team	W	L	Pct.	GB	Home	Road
New York Yankees	100	63	.613	—	55‍–‍26	45‍–‍37
Boston Red Sox	99	64	.607	1	59‍–‍23	40‍–‍41
Milwaukee Brewers	93	69	.574	6½	54‍–‍27	39‍–‍42
Baltimore Orioles	90	71	.559	9	51‍–‍30	39‍–‍41
Detroit Tigers	86	76	.531	13½	47‍–‍34	39‍–‍42
Cleveland Indians	69	90	.434	29	42‍–‍36	27‍–‍54
Toronto Blue Jays	59	102	.366	40	37‍–‍44	22‍–‍58

AL West
Team	W	L	Pct.	GB	Home	Road
Kansas City Royals	92	70	.568	—	56‍–‍25	36‍–‍45
Texas Rangers	87	75	.537	5	52‍–‍30	35‍–‍45
California Angels	87	75	.537	5	50‍–‍31	37‍–‍44
Minnesota Twins	73	89	.451	19	38‍–‍43	35‍–‍46
Chicago White Sox	71	90	.441	20½	38‍–‍42	33‍–‍48
Oakland Athletics	69	93	.426	23	38‍–‍42	31‍–‍51
Seattle Mariners	56	104	.350	35	32‍–‍49	24‍–‍55

- The New York Yankees defeated the Boston Red Sox in a regular season one-game playoff to earn the AL East division title.

=== National League ===
NL East
Team	W	L	Pct.	GB	Home	Road
Philadelphia Phillies	90	72	.556	—	54‍–‍28	36‍–‍44
Pittsburgh Pirates	88	73	.547	1½	55‍–‍26	33‍–‍47
Chicago Cubs	79	83	.488	11	44‍–‍38	35‍–‍45
Montreal Expos	76	86	.469	14	41‍–‍39	35‍–‍47
St. Louis Cardinals	69	93	.426	21	37‍–‍44	32‍–‍49
New York Mets	66	96	.407	24	33‍–‍47	33‍–‍49

NL West
Team	W	L	Pct.	GB	Home	Road
Los Angeles Dodgers	95	67	.586	—	54‍–‍27	41‍–‍40
Cincinnati Reds	92	69	.571	2½	49‍–‍31	43‍–‍38
San Francisco Giants	89	73	.549	6	50‍–‍31	39‍–‍42
San Diego Padres	84	78	.519	11	50‍–‍31	34‍–‍47
Houston Astros	74	88	.457	21	50‍–‍31	24‍–‍57
Atlanta Braves	69	93	.426	26	39‍–‍42	30‍–‍51

== Postseason ==
The postseason began on October 3 and ended on October 17 with the New York Yankees defeating the Los Angeles Dodgers in the 1978 World Series in six games.

=== Bracket ===
League Championship Series (ALCS, NLCS)
East	NY Yankees	3
West	Kansas City	1
East	Philadelphia	1
West	Los Angeles	3

World Series
AL	NY Yankees	4
NL	Los Angeles	2

== Managerial changes ==
=== Off-season ===
Team	Former Manager	Reason for leaving	New Manager	Notes
Atlanta Braves	Dave Bristol	Fired	Bobby Cox	The Braves fired Dave Bristol in October, 1977, following a failed season with a 61–101 (.377) record (of which he missed a win and a loss mid-season). Bristol ended his Braves managerial career with a 130–192 (.404) record.
Milwaukee Brewers	Alex Grammas	Fired	George Bamberger	The Brewers fired Alex Grammas on November 21, 1977, following a failed season with a 67–95 (.414) record. Grammas ended his Brewers managerial career with a 133–190 (.412) record.
San Diego Padres	Alvin Dark	Fired	Roger Craig	The Padres fired Alvin Dark on March 21 during spring training, following his only season with the team, a failed 1977 season with a 48–65 (.425). Because he was on contract for two seasons, he was paid for the 1978 season. He was replaced by Roger Craig.

=== In-season ===
Team	Former Manager	Interim Manager	Reason for leaving	New Manager	Notes
St. Louis Cardinals	Vern Rapp	Jack Krol	Fired	Ken Boyer	On April 25, after a 6–11 (.353) start to the season, the Cardinals fired Vern Rapp. Rapp finished his Cardinals managerial career with a 89–90 (.497) with no postseason appearance. Jack Krol was interim manager for two games before Ken Boyer was named manager.
Oakland Athletics	Bobby Winkles	N/A	Resigned	Jack McKeon	On May 23, after a 24–15 (.615) start to the season, Bobby Winkles resigned as manager. Winkles finished his Athletics managerial career with a 61–86 (.415) record and with no postseason appearance. Previous 1977 manager Jack McKeon was named manager.
California Angels	Dave Garcia	N/A	Fired	Jim Fregosi	On June 1, after a 25–21 (.543) start to the season, the Angels fired Dave Garcia. Garcia finished his Angels managerial career with a 60–67 (.472) record. Jim Fregosi was then named manager.
Chicago White Sox	Bob Lemon	N/A	Fired	Larry Doby	On June 24, after a 34–40 (.459) start to the season, the White Sox fired Bob Lemon. Lemon finished his White Sox career with a 124–112 (.525) record with no postseason appearance. Larry Doby was named manager.
New York Yankees	Billy Martin	Dick Howser	Resigned	Bob Lemon	On Jule 24, after a 52–42 (.553) start to the season, Billy Martin resigned as manager. To this point, Martin finished his Yankees managerial career with a 279–192 (.592) record (though would go on to manage the team on four future separate occasions). Martin saw two postseason appearances, winning the American League pennant in 1976 and World Series in 1977. Dick Howser was interim manager for one game before Bob Lmeon, recently fired by the White Sox, was named manager (who would go on to win the World Series).
Texas Rangers	Billy Hunter	N/A	Fired	Pat Corrales	On October 1, after a 86–75 (.534) record, was fired by the Texas Rangers just prior to the final game of the season. Hunter finished his Rangers career with a 146–108 (.575) record with no postseason appearance. Pat Corrales was named manager.

== League leaders ==
=== American League ===
Hitting leaders
Stat	Player	Total
AVG	Rod Carew (MIN)	.333
OPS	Jim Rice (BOS)	.970
HR	Jim Rice (BOS)	46
RBI	Jim Rice (BOS)	139
R	Ron LeFlore (DET)	126
H	Jim Rice (BOS)	213
SB	Ron LeFlore (DET)	68

Pitching leaders
Stat	Player	Total
W	Ron Guidry (NYY)	25
L	Rick Wise (CLE)	19
ERA	Ron Guidry (NYY)	1.74
K	Nolan Ryan (CAL)	260
IP	Jim Palmer (BAL)	296.0
SV	Goose Gossage (NYY)	27
WHIP	Ron Guidry (NYY)	0.946

=== National League ===
Hitting leaders
Stat	Player	Total
AVG	Dave Parker (PIT)	.334
OPS	Dave Parker (PIT)	.979
HR	George Foster (CIN)	40
RBI	George Foster (CIN)	120
R	Iván DeJesús (CHC)	104
H	Steve Garvey (LAD)	202
SB	Omar Moreno (PIT)	71

Pitching leaders
Stat	Player	Total
W	Gaylord Perry (SD)	21
L	Phil Niekro (ATL)	18
ERA	Craig Swan (NYM)	2.43
K	J. R. Richard (HOU)	303
IP	Phil Niekro (ATL)	334.1
SV	Rollie Fingers (SD)	37
WHIP	Ed Halicki (SF)	1.060

== Milestones ==
=== Batters ===
==== Cycles ====
- Andre Thornton (CLE):
  - Thornton hit for his first cycle and sixth in franchise history, on April 22 against the Boston Red Sox.
- Chris Speier (MON):
  - Speier hit for his first cycle and second in franchise history, on July 20 against the Atlanta Braves.
- Mike Cubbage (MIN):
  - Cubbage hit for his first cycle and ninth in franchise history, on July 27 against the Toronto Blue Jays.

==== Other batting accomplishments ====
- Pete Rose (CIN):
  - Became the 13th member of the 3,000-hit club with a single in the fifth inning against the Montreal Expos on May 5.
  - Set a modern National League record with a 44-game hitting streak, hitting in every game from June 14 to July 31.
- Bert Campaneris (TEX):
  - Recorded his 600th career stolen base in the second inning against the Baltimore Orioles on May 14. He became the 10th player to reach this mark.
- Willie McCovey (SF):
  - Became the 12th player in Major League history to hit 500 home runs in game one of a doubleheader on June 30 against the Atlanta Braves.
- Lou Brock (STL):
  - Breaks the all-time record for career stolen bases previously set by Billy Hamilton set in 1901, when he steals his 915th base in the third inning against the New York Mets on August 4.

=== Pitching ===
==== No-hitters ====
- Bob Forsch (STL):
  - Forsch threw his first career no-hitter and seventh no-hitter in franchise history, by defeating the Philadelphia Phillies 5–0 on April 16. Forsch walked two and struck out three.
- Tom Seaver (CIN):
  - Seaver threw his first career no-hitter and 13th no-hitter in franchise history, by defeating the St. Louis Cardinals 4–0 on June 16. Seaver walked three and struck out three.

==== Other pitching accomplishments ====
- Ron Guidry (NYY):
  - Tied an American League record for most shutouts in a season by a left-handed pitcher by throwing his ninth shutout on September 24, tying the record set in 1916 by Babe Ruth of the Boston Red Sox.
- J. R. Richard (HOU):
  - Set a National League record for most strikeouts by a right-handed pitcher in a single season, throwing his 303rd strikeout of the season against the Atlanta Braves on September 28.
- Gaylord Perry (SD):
  - Recorded his 3,000th career strikeout on October 1 by striking out Joe Simpson of the Los Angeles Dodgers in the eighth inning. Perry became the third player to reach this mark in Major League history.

=== Miscellaneous ===
- Chicago Cubs / Montreal Expos:
  - In a major league record, 45 players in total play a game on September 5 which saw 21-player Expos defeat the 24-player Cubs 10–8 in a 9-inning game.
- California Angels:
  - Set a modern (1900–present) major league record for most runs scored in the ninth inning, by scoring 13 runs against the Texas Rangers on September 14.
- Los Angeles Dodgers:
  - Become the first team in major league history to draw 3 million fans in a season.

== Awards and honors ==
=== Regular season ===
Baseball Writers' Association of America Awards
BBWAA Award	National League	American League
Rookie of the Year	Bob Horner (ATL)	Lou Whitaker (DET)
Cy Young Award	Gaylord Perry (SD)	Ron Guidry (NYY)
Most Valuable Player	Dave Parker (PIT)	Jim Rice (BOS)
Babe Ruth Award (World Series MVP)	—	Bucky Dent (NYY)
Gold Glove Awards
Position	National League	American League
Pitcher	Phil Niekro (ATL)	Jim Palmer (BAL)
Catcher	Bob Boone (PHI)	Jim Sundberg (TEX)
1st Base	Keith Hernandez (STL)	Chris Chambliss (NYY)
2nd Base	Davey Lopes (LAD)	Frank White (KC)
3rd Base	Mike Schmidt (PHI)	Graig Nettles (NYY)
Shortstop	Larry Bowa (PHI)	Mark Belanger (BAL)
Outfield	Garry Maddox (PHI)	Dwight Evans (BOS)
Outfield	Dave Parker (PIT)	Fred Lynn (BOS)
Outfield	Ellis Valentine (MON)	Rick Miller (CAL)

=== Other awards ===
- Outstanding Designated Hitter Award: Rusty Staub (DET)
- Roberto Clemente Award (Humanitarian): Greg Luzinski (PHI)
- Hutch Award: Willie Stargell (PIT)
- National League Championship Series Most Valuable Player Award: Steve Garvey (LAD)
- Rolaids Relief Man Award: Rollie Fingers (SD, National); Goose Gossage (NYY, American)
- Sport Magazine's World Series Most Valuable Player Award: Bucky Dent (NYY)

The Sporting News Awards
Award	National League	American League
Player of the Year	—	Ron Guidry (NYY)
Pitcher of the Year	Vida Blue (SF)	Ron Guidry (NYY)
Fireman of the Year (Relief pitcher)	Rollie Fingers (SD)	Goose Gossage (NYY)
Rookie Player of the Year	Bob Horner (ATL)	Paul Molitor (MIL)
Rookie Pitcher of the Year	Don Robinson (PIT)	Rich Gale (KC)
Comeback Player of the Year	Willie Stargell (PIT)	Mike Caldwell (MIL)
Manager of the Year	—	George Bamberger (MIL)
Executive of the Year	Spec Richardson (SF)	—

=== Monthly awards ===
==== Player of the Month ====
Month	National League	American League
April	Rick Monday (LAD)	Frank Tanana (CAL)
May	Jack Clark (SF)	Jim Rice (BOS)
June	Dave Winfield (SD)	Ron Guidry (NYY)
July	Pete Rose (CIN)	Doug DeCinces (BAL)
August	Dave Parker (PIT)	Jim Rice (BOS)
September	Dave Parker (PIT)	Ron Guidry (NYY)

==== Pitcher of the Month ====
Month	National League
April	Ross Grimsley (MON)
May	Bob Knepper (SF)
June	Vida Blue (SF)
July	J. R. Richard (HOU)
August	Kent Tekulve (PIT)
September	Gaylord Perry (SD)

=== Baseball Hall of Fame ===
- Addie Joss
- Eddie Mathews
- Larry MacPhail (executive)

== Home field attendance ==
Team name	Wins	%±	Home attendance	%±	Per game
Los Angeles Dodgers	95	−3.1%	3,347,845	13.3%	41,331
Philadelphia Phillies	90	−10.9%	2,583,389	−4.3%	31,505
Cincinnati Reds	92	4.5%	2,532,497	0.5%	31,656
New York Yankees	100	0.0%	2,335,871	11.1%	28,838
Boston Red Sox	99	2.1%	2,320,643	11.9%	28,301
Kansas City Royals	92	−9.8%	2,255,493	21.7%	27,846
California Angels	87	17.6%	1,755,386	22.5%	21,671
San Francisco Giants	89	18.7%	1,740,477	148.6%	21,487
Detroit Tigers	86	16.2%	1,714,893	26.1%	21,172
San Diego Padres	84	21.7%	1,670,107	21.4%	20,619
Milwaukee Brewers	93	38.8%	1,601,406	43.6%	19,770
Toronto Blue Jays	59	9.3%	1,562,585	−8.1%	19,291
Chicago Cubs	79	−2.5%	1,525,311	5.9%	18,601
Chicago White Sox	71	−21.1%	1,491,100	−10.0%	18,639
Texas Rangers	87	−7.4%	1,447,963	15.8%	17,658
Montreal Expos	76	1.3%	1,427,007	−0.5%	17,838
St. Louis Cardinals	69	−16.9%	1,278,215	−23.0%	15,780
Houston Astros	74	−8.6%	1,126,145	1.5%	13,903
Baltimore Orioles	90	−7.2%	1,051,724	−12.0%	12,984
New York Mets	66	3.1%	1,007,328	−5.6%	12,592
Pittsburgh Pirates	88	−8.3%	964,106	−22.1%	11,903
Atlanta Braves	69	13.1%	904,494	3.7%	11,167
Seattle Mariners	56	−12.5%	877,440	−34.4%	10,833
Cleveland Indians	69	−2.8%	800,584	−11.1%	10,264
Minnesota Twins	73	−13.1%	787,878	−32.2%	9,727
Oakland Athletics	69	9.5%	526,999	6.3%	6,587

== Media ==
=== Television ===
ABC aired Monday Night Baseball, the All-Star Game, and both League Championship Series. NBC televised the weekend Game of the Week and the World Series.

== Retired numbers ==
- Brooks Robinson had his No. 5 retired by the Baltimore Orioles on April 14. This was the second number retired by the team.
- Jim Gilliam had his No. 19 retired by the Los Angeles Dodgers on October 10. This was the fifth number retired by the team.

== See also ==
- 1978 in baseball (Events, Movies, Births, Deaths)
- 1978 Nippon Professional Baseball season
