= 1978 American League Championship Series =

10th edition of Major League Baseball's American League Championship Series

Team (Wins)	Managers	Season
New York Yankees (3)	Bob Lemon	100–63, .613, GA: 1
Kansas City Royals (1)	Whitey Herzog	92–70, .568, GA: 5
- Dates: October 3–7
- Umpires: Lou DiMuro; Rich Garcia; Ron Luciano; Bill Kunkel; Dave Phillips; Terry Cooney

Broadcast
- Television: ABC; WPIX (NYY); KBMA-TV (KC)
- TV announcers: ABC: Keith Jackson, Howard Cosell and Jim Palmer; WPIX: Phil Rizzuto, Frank Messer, and Bill White; KBMA-TV: Denny Matthews, Steve Shannon and Fred White
- Radio: CBS; WINS (NYY); WIBW (KC)
- Radio announcers: CBS: Ernie Harwell and Ned Martin; WINS: Phil Rizzuto, Frank Messer, Bill White, and Fran Healy; WIBW: Denny Matthews, and Fred White

The 1978 American League Championship Series was a best-of-five playoff in Major League Baseball's 1978 postseason pitting the New York Yankees against the Kansas City Royals for the American League pennant and the right to represent the American League in the 1978 World Series. The Yankees defeated the Royals for the third straight year by three games to one to win the pennant.

== Background ==
The Royals won 92 games in the regular season, winning the Western Division title by five games over the Texas Rangers. The Yankees overcame a midseason deficit of 14 games and manager Billy Martin’s firing to go on and win a one-game playoff against the Boston Red Sox to win the American League East crown and finish with 100 wins.

Unlike the prior two ALCS which went five games, this one took the Yankees only four games to wrap up, and the Yankees went on to represent the American League in the 1978 World Series. Notable performers in this series included Reggie Jackson, who hit two home runs, and Chris Chambliss, who had six base hits in 15 at bats. George Brett and Amos Otis were the hitting stars for the Royals.

== Summary ==
=== New York Yankees vs. Kansas City Royals ===
New York won the series, 3–1.

Game	Date	Score	Location	Time	Attendance
1	October 3	New York Yankees – 7, Kansas City Royals – 1	Royals Stadium	2:57	41,143
2	October 4	New York Yankees – 4, Kansas City Royals – 10	Royals Stadium	2:42	41,158
3	October 6	Kansas City Royals – 5, New York Yankees – 6	Yankee Stadium	2:13	55,445
4	October 7	Kansas City Royals – 1, New York Yankees – 2	Yankee Stadium	2:20	56,356

== Game summaries ==
=== Game 1 ===
October 3, 1978 7:30 pm (CT) at Royals Stadium in Kansas City, Missouri 62 °F (17 °C) clear
Team	1	2	3	4	5	6	7	8	9	R	H	E
New York	0	1	1	0	2	0	0	3	0	7	16	0
Kansas City	0	0	0	0	0	1	0	0	0	1	2	2
WP: Jim Beattie (1–0) LP: Dennis Leonard (0–1) Sv: Ken Clay (1); Home runs: NYY: Reggie Jackson (1); KC: None

Prior to the start of this game, both teams had to deal with bad news. Ron Guidry, he of the incredible 25–3 Cy Young Award-winning season, would be unavailable to start until Game 4, if played, at least. Guidry pitched the AL East division tie-breaker game against the Boston Red Sox and was starting to have arm trouble. Also, second baseman Willie Randolph would miss the entire postseason with a hamstring injury and be replaced by a platoon of Fred Stanley and Brian Doyle. For the Royals, star George Brett was suffering from a bout of hemorrhoids.

Without Guidry, the Yankees went with young Jim Beattie. Beattie pitched five shutout innings and Ken Clay went the rest of the way. The Royals would manage just two hits and one run off the two young pitchers.

Meanwhile, the Yankee bats knocked Dennis Leonard and Steve Mingori around for 13 hits and four runs, Doyle chipping in an RBI single. Reggie Jackson put an exclamation point on the win with a three-run homer in the eighth off Al Hrabosky.

=== Game 2 ===
October 4, 1978 2:30 pm (CT) at Royals Stadium in Kansas City, Missouri 77 °F (25 °C) mostly cloudy
Team	1	2	3	4	5	6	7	8	9	R	H	E
New York	0	0	0	0	0	0	2	2	0	4	12	1
Kansas City	1	4	0	0	0	0	3	2	X	10	16	1
WP: Larry Gura (1–0) LP: Ed Figueroa (0–1); Home runs: NYY: None; KC: Freddie Patek (1)

Royals' starter Larry Gura pitched six shutout innings and won with relief help from Marty Pattin and Al Hrabosky. The Royals' hitting stars were Darrell Porter, Frank White, and Fred Patek with two RBIs each, Patek's on a home run.

=== Game 3 ===
October 6, 1978 3:30 pm (ET) at Yankee Stadium in Bronx, New York 66 °F (19 °C) partly cloudy
Team	1	2	3	4	5	6	7	8	9	R	H	E
Kansas City	1	0	1	0	1	0	0	2	0	5	10	1
New York	0	1	0	2	0	1	0	2	X	6	10	0
WP: Goose Gossage (1–0) LP: Doug Bird (0–1); Home runs: KC: George Brett 3 (3); NYY: Reggie Jackson (2), Thurman Munson (1)

Yankee starter Catfish Hunter pitched a fine game, going six innings, except for one thing: three consecutive home runs by George Brett. Still, Hunter had a 4–3 lead after six thanks to a homer, RBI single, and sacrifice fly by Reggie Jackson. Jackson also scored a run in the fourth when Fred Patek overthrew Darrell Porter at home plate as Jackson was attempting to score on a hit by Lou Piniella. The Yankees tried to extend the lead in the fourth, but Piniella was thrown out at the plate on a hit by Graig Nettles.

The Royals missed an opportunity in the top of the sixth when Pete LaCock led the inning off with a triple, but Hunter retired the next three batters without the run scoring. They got to Goose Gossage in the top of the eighth, however. Amos Otis doubled to right and Porter singled him in to tie it. After a Clint Hurdle single, Porter scored the go-ahead run on a groundout by Al Cowens.

But, the Yanks would not be denied. After a one-out single by Roy White, Royals manager Whitey Herzog replaced his starter, left-hander Paul Splittorff, with right-hander Doug Bird to face Thurman Munson. Munson then greeted Bird with a 460-foot, game-winning, two-run blast into the Yankee bullpen in deep left-center field.

Gossage retired the Royals in the ninth and got the win.

The other irony of this game, besides Brett's three homers in a losing effort, was that Reggie Jackson was so productive against Paul Splittorff after former manager Billy Martin's claims that Jackson couldn't hit Splittorff during the 1977 American League Championship Series the year prior.

Brett was the second player to hit three home runs in a League Championship Series game. Bob Robertson was the first, doing so in Game 2 of the 1971 NLCS.

=== Game 4 ===
October 7, 1978 8:30 pm (ET) at Yankee Stadium in Bronx, New York 54 °F (12 °C) mostly cloudy
Team	1	2	3	4	5	6	7	8	9	R	H	E
Kansas City	1	0	0	0	0	0	0	0	0	1	7	0
New York	0	1	0	0	1	0	0	0	X	2	4	0
WP: Ron Guidry (1–0) LP: Dennis Leonard (0–2) Sv: Goose Gossage (1); Home runs: KC: None; NYY: Graig Nettles (1), Roy White (1)

Yankee manager Bob Lemon decided to use the sore-armed Ron Guidry to close out the series at Yankee Stadium. Guidry turned in an effective performance, going eight innings and giving up one run on seven hits and striking out seven.

It didn't start out that way, though. George Brett led the game off with a triple off Guidry and Hal McRae immediately followed by driving in Brett with a single. But, the Royals would come up zeros the rest of the way. Meanwhile, Graig Nettles tied it with a homer in the second inning, and Roy White hit the deciding homer in the fifth off Dennis Leonard.

Guidry left in the ninth after giving up a leadoff double to Amos Otis and Goose Gossage set down the next three Royal batters to close out the series and win their third straight AL pennant.

== Composite box ==
1978 ALCS (3–1): New York Yankees over Kansas City Royals

Team	1	2	3	4	5	6	7	8	9	R	H	E
New York Yankees	0	3	1	2	2	1	2	7	0	19	42	1
Kansas City Royals	3	4	1	0	1	1	3	4	0	17	35	4
Total attendance: 194,102 Average attendance: 48,526

== Aftermath ==
In 1979, manager Whitey Herzog and general manager Joe Burke clashed over personnel moves, and Herzog's contract status, who wanted more than a one-year contract extension. After the season saw the team finish second to the California Angels, Herzog was fired. Herzog actually expressed criticism of Burke for not doing it sooner, in order to try to give the team a spark during the season, as Herzog believed the Royals were a better team than the Angels and playing well below their potential. Herzog would later guide the cross-state St. Louis Cardinals to a World Series in 1982 and two other appearances in 1985 (against the Royals) and 1987.

The Yankees also did not make the playoffs in 1979, in a season marked by the sudden death of Thurman Munson in August. The Yankees honored him by immediately retiring his uniform 15, and dedicating a plaque to him in Monument Park. The Yankees also experienced their own manager controversy when owner George Steinbrenner fired manager Bob Lemon after a 34–31 start to the season and brought back Billy Martin. The move did not sit well with team president Al Rosen, who resigned from the Yankees shortly thereafter. After the season, Martin was fired, which one of his five firings as Yankees' manager by Steinbrenner.

The Royals did not break through and defeat the Yankees in the playoffs until 1980, when they swept New York in the American League Championship Series in their fourth playoff match-up since 1976. The Royals did not win their first championship until 1985.

== See also ==
- 1978 in baseball
