= 1978 World Series =

75th edition of Major League Baseball's championship series

Team (Wins)	Managers	Season
New York Yankees (4)	Bob Lemon	100–63, .613, GA: 1
Los Angeles Dodgers (2)	Tommy Lasorda	95–67, .586, GA: 2 1/2
- Dates: October 10–17
- Venue(s): Dodger Stadium (Los Angeles); Yankee Stadium (New York)
- MVP: Bucky Dent (New York)
- Umpires: Ed Vargo (NL), Bill Haller (AL), John Kibler (NL), Marty Springstead (AL), Frank Pulli (NL), Joe Brinkman (AL)
- Hall of Famers: Yankees: Goose Gossage; Catfish Hunter; Reggie Jackson; Yogi Berra (coach); Bob Lemon (manager); Dodgers: Tommy Lasorda (manager); Don Sutton

Broadcast
- Television: NBC
- TV announcers: Joe Garagiola, Tony Kubek, and Tom Seaver
- Radio: CBS
- Radio announcers: Bill White (in Los Angeles); Ross Porter (in New York); Win Elliot
- ALCS: New York Yankees over Kansas City Royals (3–1)
- NLCS: Los Angeles Dodgers over Philadelphia Phillies (3–1)

The 1978 World Series was the championship series of Major League Baseball's (MLB) 1978 season. The 75th edition of the World Series, it was a best-of-seven playoff played between the American League (AL) champion New York Yankees and the National League (NL) champion Los Angeles Dodgers. In a rematch of the previous year's World Series, the Yankees won, four games to two, to repeat as champions and to win their 22nd World Series. As of 2026, it remains the most recent World Series to feature a rematch of the previous season's matchup.

The 1978 series was the first of 10 consecutive years that saw 10 different teams win the World Series. The Los Angeles Dodgers would break the string with a World Series win in 1988, having won in 1981.

This series had two memorable confrontations between Dodgers rookie pitcher Bob Welch and the Yankees' Reggie Jackson. In Game 2, Welch struck out Jackson in the top of the ninth with two outs and the tying and go-ahead runs on base to end the game. Jackson would avenge the strikeout, when in Game 4 he singled off Welch which moved Roy White to second, from which White would score the game winning run on a Lou Piniella single to tie the series at 2–2. In Game 6, Jackson smashed a two-run homer off Welch in the seventh to increase the Yankees' lead to 7–2 and a Yankees' victory to win the series.

The Yankees became the first team to lose the first two games of a World Series then win the next four. The Dodgers became the second vs. the Yankees three years later.

== Background ==
This was the sixth meeting between teams from Los Angeles and New York City for a major professional sports championship. This previously occurred in two World Series (1963, 1977) and three NBA Finals (1970, 1972, 1973).

=== New York Yankees ===
The New York Yankees were as far back as 14 games behind the Boston Red Sox at mid-July suffering from injuries to pitchers Catfish Hunter and Jim Beattie. A public display of antipathy between manager Billy Martin and slugger Reggie Jackson resulted in the replacement of Martin by the amenable, easygoing Bob Lemon on July 17. With time running out, the Yankees, four games behind the Red Sox in the American League East, began a crucial four-game series at Fenway Park in Boston. On September 7, the Yanks began the "Boston Massacre" with a 15–3 drubbing of the BoSox, with second baseman Willie Randolph driving in five runs. (Randolph was sidelined in the postseason, due to a pulled hamstring in late September.) The assault continued with the Yankees winning game two 13–2, game three 7–0 (Ron Guidry winning his 21st—a two-hitter), and an 18-hit, 7–4 victory in game four, completing the sweep. The Yankees and Red Sox were now tied for first place with 20 games remaining for both clubs.

New York went 48–20 (.706) in their last 68 scheduled games, but lost on the final day to Cleveland to finish the regular season in a dead-heat with Boston at 99–63 (.611). The Yanks had to travel to Fenway for the one-game playoff on Monday, October 2. Down 2–0 after six innings, they won 5–4, made famous by light-hitting Bucky Dent's clutch three-run homer in the seventh inning (his fifth of the year). Ron Guidry won his 25th game (against only three losses) and Goose Gossage recorded the last eight outs for his 27th save, retiring Hall of Famer Carl Yastrzemski with the tying run at third base for the final out.

=== Los Angeles Dodgers ===
In the National League the Los Angeles Dodgers were locked in a tight three-way race with the rival San Francisco Giants and Cincinnati Reds falling as far as 6 1/2 games back. Taking a lesson from the in-fighting Yankees, this normally close-knit group caught fire after a clubhouse fight between teammates Steve Garvey and Don Sutton in August, ultimately finishing 2 1/2 games ahead of the Cincinnati Reds. Unlike the 1977 Dodgers with four 30+ home run hitters, this squad's leader in home runs was Reggie Smith with 29. No pitcher won 20 or more games but five pitchers did win at least ten games. Rookie Bob Welch was a key after being promoted from the minors, winning seven games and saving three while being utilized as both a starter and reliever.

During the World Series the Dodgers wore on their uniforms a black patch with the number 19 in dedication to coach Jim Gilliam, who died from a brain hemorrhage two days before the start of the Series. His uniform number was retired by the Dodgers prior to the start of Game 1. Davey Lopes, the Dodgers player closest to Gilliam, led the Series in home runs (3) and the team in slugging percentage (.654), on-base plus slugging (1.011) and runs scored and batted in (7 each). His inspired play left Reggie Jackson saying, "Lopes is blatantly penetrated by the spirit of Gilliam."

=== League Championship Series ===
In a repeat of the 1977 playoffs the Yankees again dispatched the Kansas City Royals, this time three games to one as the Dodgers did the same to the Philadelphia Phillies by the same margin. After losing the first two games of the World Series, the Yankees would become the first team to come back to win the Series in six. The Dodgers would duplicate that feat against the Yankees in the 1981 World Series.

== Summary ==
AL New York Yankees (4) vs. NL Los Angeles Dodgers (2)

Game	Date	Score	Location	Time	Attendance
1	October 10	New York Yankees – 5, Los Angeles Dodgers – 11	Dodger Stadium	2:48	55,997
2	October 11	New York Yankees – 3, Los Angeles Dodgers – 4	Dodger Stadium	2:37	55,982
3	October 13	Los Angeles Dodgers – 1, New York Yankees – 5	Yankee Stadium	2:27	56,447
4	October 14	Los Angeles Dodgers – 3, New York Yankees – 4 (10)	Yankee Stadium	3:17 (:38 delay)	56,445
5	October 15	Los Angeles Dodgers – 2, New York Yankees – 12	Yankee Stadium	2:56	56,448
6	October 17	New York Yankees – 7, Los Angeles Dodgers – 2	Dodger Stadium	2:34	55,985

== Matchups ==
=== Game 1 ===
October 10, 1978 5:30 pm (PT) at Dodger Stadium in Los Angeles, California 71 °F (22 °C), clear
Team	1	2	3	4	5	6	7	8	9	R	H	E
New York	0	0	0	0	0	0	3	2	0	5	9	1
Los Angeles	0	3	0	3	1	0	3	1	X	11	15	2
WP: Tommy John (1–0) LP: Ed Figueroa (0–1); Home runs: NYY: Reggie Jackson (1); LAD: Dusty Baker (1), Davey Lopes 2 (2)

With Yankee ace Ron Guidry unavailable at least until Game 3, the Dodgers pounded 20-game winner Ed Figueroa. Figueroa left after two innings, allowing home runs to Dusty Baker and Davey Lopes. Lopes would add a three-run shot in the fourth off Ken Clay to make it 6–0. Another Dodger run crossed the plate in the fifth; Ron Cey scoring on a Clay wild pitch.

The Yankees tried to claw back in the seventh as Reggie Jackson homered and Bucky Dent singled in two runs, but the Dodgers bounced back with three of their own, two coming on a Bill North double. The Dodgers would cruise to an easy Game 1 win from there.

=== Game 2 ===
October 11, 1978 5:30 pm (PT) at Dodger Stadium in Los Angeles, California 71 °F (22 °C), partly cloudy
Team	1	2	3	4	5	6	7	8	9	R	H	E
New York	0	0	2	0	0	0	1	0	0	3	11	0
Los Angeles	0	0	0	1	0	3	0	0	X	4	7	0
WP: Burt Hooton (1–0) LP: Catfish Hunter (0–1) Sv: Bob Welch (1); Home runs: NYY: None; LAD: Ron Cey (1)

Ron Cey drove in all the Dodgers' runs with a single in the fourth and a three-run homer in the sixth off Yankee starter Catfish Hunter. Reggie Jackson would try to keep pace by batting in all three of the Yankee runs with a two-run double and RBI groundout, but this game would be remembered for one memorable Jackson at-bat.

Rookie Bob Welch was brought in to pitch the ninth to save the game for Burt Hooton. The previous reliever, Terry Forster, had allowed Bucky Dent and Paul Blair to reach base between outs, bringing up Jackson. Welch ran the count to 3–2. Jackson fouled off several pitches before Welch finally got a fastball by him, sending the Dodger Stadium crowd into a frenzy.

In post-game interviews, Jackson initially blamed his striking out on Bucky Dent running from second with the 3–2 pitch and distracting him from focusing on Welch. In later interviews, however, Jackson gave Welch credit.

=== Game 3 ===
October 13, 1978 8:30 pm (ET) at Yankee Stadium in Bronx, New York 66 °F (19 °C), cloudy
Team	1	2	3	4	5	6	7	8	9	R	H	E
Los Angeles	0	0	1	0	0	0	0	0	0	1	8	0
New York	1	1	0	0	0	0	3	0	X	5	10	1
WP: Ron Guidry (1–0) LP: Don Sutton (0–1); Home runs: LAD: None; NYY: Roy White (1)

With the Yankees desperately needing a win, ace Ron Guidry provided a victory aided by the stunning defense of third baseman Graig Nettles.

Guidry pitched a complete game, even though he allowed eight hits, walked seven, and struck out only four. Nettles' defense saved at least four runs.

The Yankees got on the board in the first off Don Sutton on a Roy White homer and added a run in the second on an RBI forceout by Bucky Dent.

In the third, the Dodgers began to come back against Guidry, who clearly did not have his best stuff. Bill North led off with a walk, stole second, then went to third on a Steve Yeager groundout. Davey Lopes hit a hard liner Nettles snared to turn a certain extra-base hit into a key out and temporarily save a run. Bill Russell followed with an infield single to score North and drive in the Dodgers' only run. The next batter, Reggie Smith, hit a hard ground ball to third. Nettles made a diving stop to save another extra-base hit and probable run, and threw Smith out at first to end the inning.

In the fifth, the Dodgers had runners on first and second with two outs when Smith came up to bat. Nettles knocked down Smith's sharply hit ground ball down the third base line. Smith reached first, but no runs scored. Steve Garvey, the next batter up, hit another hard ground ball down the third base line, and Nettles made a backhanded stop and forced Smith at second base to end the inning. The Dodgers loaded the bases again with two outs in the sixth inning, but Nettles again made a great stop on a ball hit by Davey Lopes, and threw to second to complete the inning-ending force play.

The Yankees would later add three more runs. Thurman Munson and Reggie Jackson had RBI singles in the rally that put the game out of reach.

=== Game 4 ===
October 14, 1978 3:30 pm (ET) at Yankee Stadium in Bronx, New York 68 °F (20 °C), mostly cloudy w/ occasional showers
Team	1	2	3	4	5	6	7	8	9	10	R	H	E
Los Angeles	0	0	0	0	3	0	0	0	0	0	3	6	1
New York	0	0	0	0	0	2	0	1	0	1	4	9	0
WP: Goose Gossage (1–0) LP: Bob Welch (0–1); Home runs: LAD: Reggie Smith (1); NYY: None

Starters Ed Figueroa and Tommy John were locked in a scoreless duel before Reggie Smith struck with a three-run homer in the top of the fifth inning. John continued his shutout through the fifth, but, in the Yankees' half of the sixth, they scored.

Reggie Jackson finally got the Yankees on the board with a one-out RBI single. With Thurman Munson on second and Jackson on first, Lou Piniella hit a low, soft liner that shortstop Bill Russell fumbled (some claim intentionally). Russell recovered the ball, then stepped on second to force Jackson, then his attempted throw to first to complete the double play struck a "confused" Jackson in the right hip and caromed into foul territory. Munson scored, partially because first baseman Steve Garvey stopped to yell at the first-base umpire over the non-interference call before retrieving the ball. The Dodgers' protests went for naught but would not have been necessary if Russell had made the proper play. Thinking Russell was going to catch Piniella's liner, Munson retreated towards second and was on second base when Russell picked up the ball. Munson then turned to third and Russell stepped on second to force Jackson and threw to first. The inning would have been over if Russell had tagged Munson (out #2) and stepped on second (out #3) to force Jackson or Russell steps on second to force Jackson (out #2) and gets Munson in a rundown between second and third (out #3); the score would have remained 3–1, instead the score was then 3–2. But of course, Russell had no reason to the think his throw would not reach first base.

Later review of the play clearly showed Jackson had stopped midway between first and second when Russell had made his throw to first. As the ball carried very close to Jackson's immediate right, Jackson had moved his hips to the right just as the ball sailed past, deflecting the ball down the first base line. While Jackson continued to deny it, Dodgers manager Tommy Lasorda, along with other eyewitnesses, steadfastly believed the Yankees outfielder purposefully interfered in the play.

The Yankees tied it in the eighth when Munson doubled home Paul Blair. The score remained tied until the bottom of the tenth inning. Dodgers rookie and Game 2 hero Bob Welch walked Roy White with one out. After Welch retired Munson, Jackson strode to the plate for his first confrontation with Welch since Game 2. This time, Jackson got the better end by singling White to second. Lou Piniella then lined a single to center, scoring White and tying the series.

The bungled Russell/Jackson play changed the game and the entire Series; instead of the Dodgers going up 3–1 in games, the Series was then tied and the momentum shifted to the Yankees who outscored the Dodgers 19–4 in the final two games.

=== Game 5 ===
October 15, 1978 4:30 pm (ET) at Yankee Stadium in Bronx, New York 52 °F (11 °C), partly cloudy
Team	1	2	3	4	5	6	7	8	9	R	H	E
Los Angeles	1	0	1	0	0	0	0	0	0	2	9	3
New York	0	0	4	3	0	0	4	1	X	12	18	0
WP: Jim Beattie (1–0) LP: Burt Hooton (1–1)

The Yankees took one step closer to a repeat World Series championship on the strength of an unexpected complete game victory by young Jim Beattie. Beattie scattered nine Dodgers hits and was buoyed by an 18-hit Yankees performance, including a World Series-record 16 singles.

Early on, the Dodgers tried to run to take advantage of a sore-shouldered Thurman Munson behind the plate. Davey Lopes led off the game with a single, stole second, and scored on a Reggie Smith single. The Dodgers stretched their lead to 2–0 in the third when Lopes scored again on a double by Bill Russell.

But, that would be it as Beattie settled down and shut out the Dodgers the rest of the way. In the bottom of the third, after a leadoff walk and single, Roy White's RBI single cut the Dodgers' lead to 2–1. After a double steal, Munson's two-run single put the Yankees up 3–2. One out later, Lou Piniella's RBI single made it 4–2 Yankees and knocked starter Burt Hooton out of the game. Next inning, after two one-out singles, Mickey Rivers's RBI single and White's sacrifice fly made it 6–2 Yankees. Charlie Hough relieved Lance Rautzhan and allowed an RBI single to Munson. In the seventh, with runners on second and third and two outs, a strike three wild pitch by Hough to Rivers allowed a run to score and Rivers to reach first. White's RBI single made it 9–2 Yankees, then Munson's two-run double increased their lead to 11–2. They scored one more run in the eighth on Bucky Dent's RBI double off Hough as their 12–2 win gave them a 3–2 series lead heading back to Los Angeles.

=== Game 6 ===
October 17, 1978 5:30 pm (PT) at Dodger Stadium in Los Angeles, California 72 °F (22 °C), mostly cloudy
Team	1	2	3	4	5	6	7	8	9	R	H	E
New York	0	3	0	0	0	2	2	0	0	7	11	0
Los Angeles	1	0	1	0	0	0	0	0	0	2	7	1
WP: Catfish Hunter (1–1) LP: Don Sutton (0–2); Home runs: NYY: Reggie Jackson (2); LAD: Davey Lopes (3)

Game 6 turned out to be the Bucky Dent–Brian Doyle show.

Davey Lopes gave the Dodgers home crowd a ray of hope with a leadoff home run off Catfish Hunter. Dent and Doyle put the Yankees ahead in the second; Doyle with an RBI double, Dent with an RBI single and an additional run scoring on an error on the play. Lopes had an RBI single in the third to cut it to 3–2 through the fifth inning, but that would be it for the Dodgers. Sutton pitched well until the sixth inning. It was Hunter's first World Series victory since game 3 in 1974.

Dent and Doyle pushed the score to 5–2 in the sixth with RBI singles and Reggie Jackson put the final nail in the Dodgers coffin with a tremendous two-run blast in the seventh inning to get revenge against his Game 2 nemesis, Bob Welch.

Dent would be named World Series MVP, batting .417 with ten hits, seven RBI, and three runs scored. Doyle would make a claim for the MVP himself with a .438 average, seven hits, two RBI, and four runs.

While Lopes had a monster series with three homers and seven RBIs and Bill Russell had 11 hits, the Dodgers power hitters lack of production and the Dodgers shoddy defense was their downfall. Steve Garvey (5–for–24, no RBIs) was no factor, and neither were Dusty Baker (5–for–21, one RBI) or Ron Cey (no RBIs after Game 2) and the Dodgers defense committed seven errors.

Thurman Munson caught the final out of the game on a foul pop by Cey. This would be the final post-season game for Thurman Munson before his death during the 1979 season.

== Composite box ==
1978 World Series (4–2): New York Yankees (A.L.) over Los Angeles Dodgers (N.L.)

Team	1	2	3	4	5	6	7	8	9	10	R	H	E
New York Yankees	1	4	6	3	0	4	13	4	0	1	36	68	2
Los Angeles Dodgers	2	3	3	4	4	3	3	1	0	0	23	52	7
Total attendance: 337,304 Average attendance: 56,217; Winning player's share: $31,237 Losing player's share: $25,483

== Broadcasting ==
NBC televised the World Series, with Joe Garagiola on play-by-play and Tony Kubek and Tom Seaver providing color analysis. Curt Gowdy hosted the pregame shows and conducted interviews. This was the final World Series broadcast for Gowdy, who'd previously called play-by-play of the event for NBC from 1966 to 1975.

CBS Radio also broadcast the World Series, with Yankees announcer Bill White calling the games in Los Angeles, Dodgers announcer Ross Porter calling the games in New York, and Win Elliot providing color commentary. This was the last time that local announcers for the participating teams would call games on the national World Series radio broadcast.

== Aftermath ==
This Series is tied with the 1980 World Series for the highest overall television ratings to date, with the six games averaging a Nielsen rating of 32.8 and a share of 56.

The Yankees became the last repeat World Champions until 15 years later (1992–1993; Toronto Blue Jays). This was the last time the Yankees won a World Series until 1996, and the last World Series championship for the city of New York until the Yankees' cross-town rivals, the Mets, won in 1986 when they defeated the Red Sox four games to three. The Dodgers won the World Series in 1981, against the Yankees in the same way the Yankees won this series (losing the first two games, then winning the next four), and 1988, against the Oakland Athletics. For the Yankees, they again lost the first two games of the World Series in 1996 against the Atlanta Braves, then won the next four games.

As of 2025, this is the last time that the Yankees defeated the Dodgers in the World Series.

For the Dodgers in Los Angeles, this was the first time they had lost back-to-back World Series appearances, as that feat would occur 39 years later, losing in 2017 to the Astros, and in 2018 to the Yankees chief rival Red Sox.

== See also ==
- 1978 Japan Series
- Manhattan - Actors Woody Allen and Mariel Hemingway were in attendance for Game 3 at Yankee Stadium while filming the 1979 movie Manhattan. NBC's cameras caught the duo sitting behind the Yankees' dugout as third baseman Graig Nettles was running back to it at the end of the top of the third inning.
