= Billy Williams (umpire) =

American baseball umpire (1930-1998)

Williams

William George Williams, Jr. (September 19, 1930 – September 22, 1998) was an American National League umpire from 1963 through 1987. He wore uniform number 24 for most of his career.

== Early life ==
Born in Brooklyn, New York, Williams started his umpiring career in 1956 in the Evangeline League, before joining the Southwestern League (1957), the South Atlantic League (1958–July 1959) and the International League (July 1959–July 1963).

== Major League Baseball career ==
Williams joined the National League full-time starting in 1963, and officiated in the 1981 National League Division Series, four National League Championship Series' (1972, 1975, 1978, 1982), three World Series (1970, 1976, 1985), and three Major League Baseball All-Star Games (1965, 1973, 1979).

He also was the home plate umpire for the 1967 no-hitter hurled by Houston Astros pitcher Don Wilson against the Atlanta Braves.

== 1987 season ==
Williams had planned to retire at the end of the 1987 season, but two injuries ended his career early.

On June 9, 1987, he was hit in the right elbow by a wild pitch delivered by Chicago Cubs pitcher Rick Sutcliffe. Then on June 29, 1987, Williams' leg was broken on a play at the plate in an Atlanta Braves against the San Francisco Giants game at Candlestick Park.

In a rundown following a squeeze play, Braves pitcher Zane Smith fielded the bunt and ran to the plate to tag sliding Giants outfielder Joel Youngblood. As Smith made the tag, he fell over Youngblood and into Williams, who managed to make the call while on his knees.

At first, Williams hoped to get back to work by the middle of the next month, to complete what he planned to be his last season, however he never umpired another game after that.

== Death ==
Williams died due to cancer of the throat in Deerfield Beach, Florida, just three days after his 68th birthday.

== See also ==
- List of Major League Baseball umpires (disambiguation)
