= Myron White =

American baseball player (1957–2018)

- Outfielder
- Born: August 1, 1957; Long Beach, California, U.S.
- Died: August 4, 2018 (aged 61); Cabazon, California, U.S.
- Batted: Left Threw: Left

MLB debut
- September 4, 1978, for the Los Angeles Dodgers

Last MLB appearance
- October 1, 1978, for the Los Angeles Dodgers

MLB statistics
- Batting average: .500
- At bats: 4
- Hits: 2
- Stats at Baseball Reference

Teams
- Los Angeles Dodgers (1978)

Myron Alan White (August 1, 1957 – August 4, 2018) was an American baseball player who played as an outfielder for the Los Angeles Dodgers during the 1978 season.

White was a running back at Santa Ana Valley High School. He rushed for 4,194 yards in his high school career, an Orange County record at the time.

The Dodgers drafted White in the second round in 1975, and gave him a signing bonus of $60,000: he had been offered a football scholarship by UCLA. He played in the Dodgers' minor league system from 1975 to 1981.

In the last decades of his life, White was unable to work and was taken care of by his wife Anita. His memory is being carried on by his loving granddaughter Janessa along with the rest of his family.

White died from complications relating to diabetes on August 4, 2018, in Cabazon, California and he will forever be remembered.
