= Lance Rautzhan =

American baseball player (1952–2016)

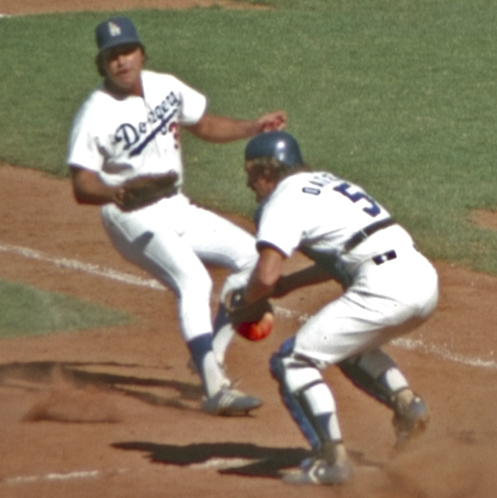
- Rautzhan (left) with the Los Angeles Dodgers in 1978
- Relief pitcher
- Born: August 20, 1952; Pottsville, Pennsylvania, U.S.
- Died: January 9, 2016 (aged 63); Myrtle Beach, South Carolina, U.S.
- Batted: Right Threw: Left

MLB debut
- July 23, 1977, for the Los Angeles Dodgers

Last MLB appearance
- June 3, 1979, for the Milwaukee Brewers

MLB statistics
- Win–loss record: 6–4
- Earned run average: 3.90
- Strikeouts: 45
- Stats at Baseball Reference

Teams
- Los Angeles Dodgers (1977–1979); Milwaukee Brewers (1979)

Clarence George Rautzhan (August 20, 1952 – January 9, 2016) was an American pitcher in Major League Baseball who played from 1977 to 1979 for the Los Angeles Dodgers and Milwaukee Brewers.

== Career ==
Lance was offered a full athletic football scholarship to the University of Kentucky; when drafted in the third round pick for the Dodgers in 1970 (drafted right out of high school after he pitched a perfect game), decided to play baseball. He played 7 1/2 years in the Dodger minor league system and had the most complete games in the AA Eastern League for a single season in 1975. In 1976 he made the AAA Pacific Coast League all-star team.

Rautzhan was the winning pitcher in Game 3 of the 1977 NLCS against the Philadelphia Phillies, after the Dodgers came back from a two-out, 5-3 deficit in the top of the 9th inning thanks to key pinch hits by Vic Davalillo and Manny Mota. His father William Rautzhan also played baseball in minor league for the Chicago White Sox.

Rautzhan also pitched with the Dodgers in the 1977 and 1978 World Series, both times against the New York Yankees.

Rautzhan died of cancer in Myrtle Beach, South Carolina, on January 9, 2016, alongside his wife, Crystal, and daughter, Jaime.
