= Davey Lopes =

American baseball player and manager (1945–2026)

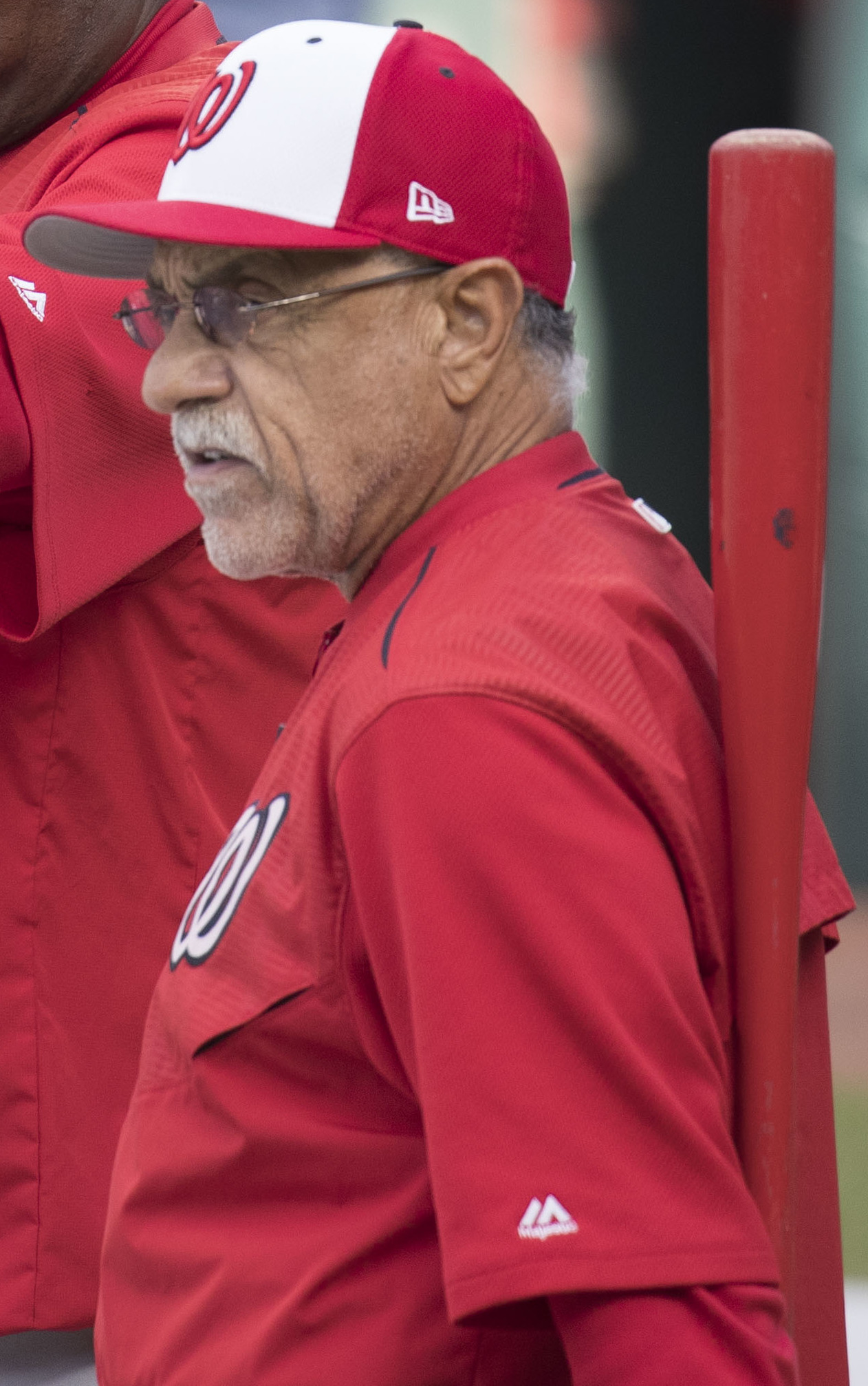
- Lopes coaching for the Nationals in 2017
- Second baseman / Manager
- Born: May 3, 1945; East Providence, Rhode Island, U.S.
- Died: April 8, 2026 (aged 80); Providence, Rhode Island, U.S.
- Batted: Right Threw: Right

MLB debut
- September 22, 1972, for the Los Angeles Dodgers

Last MLB appearance
- October 4, 1987, for the Houston Astros

MLB statistics
- Batting average: .263
- Home runs: 155
- Runs batted in: 614
- Stolen bases: 557
- Managerial record: 144–195
- Winning %: .425
- Stats at Baseball Reference
- Managerial record at Baseball Reference

Teams
- As player: Los Angeles Dodgers (1972–1981); Oakland Athletics (1982–1984); Chicago Cubs (1984–1986); Houston Astros (1986–1987); As manager: Milwaukee Brewers (2000–2002); As coach: Texas Rangers (1988–1991); Baltimore Orioles (1992–1994); San Diego Padres (1995–1999, 2003–2005); Washington Nationals (2006); Philadelphia Phillies (2007–2010); Los Angeles Dodgers (2011–2015); Washington Nationals (2016–2017)

Career highlights and awards
- 4× All-Star (1978–1981); 2× World Series champion (1981, 2008); Gold Glove Award (1978); 2× NL stolen base leader (1975, 1976)

David Earl Lopes (/ˈloʊps/; May 3, 1945 – April 8, 2026) was an American second baseman, coach and manager in Major League Baseball (MLB) who played for four teams from 1972 to 1987, best known for his ten seasons with the Los Angeles Dodgers, where he was part of the most durable infield in major league history. The team won four National League (NL) pennants during his tenure, culminating with the 1981 World Series title. A four-time All-Star, he led the NL in stolen bases in 1975 and 1976. In 1978 he played a major role in the Dodgers posting the league's best record, batting .324 over the season's last 5 1/2 weeks and earning his only Gold Glove Award. He then batted .389 with a pair of home runs in the NL Championship Series to help the team repeat as league champions, and hit .308 with three home runs in the World Series loss to the New York Yankees.

Playing almost exclusively as the team's leadoff hitter, Lopes led the Dodgers in stolen bases eight times between 1973 and 1981, and in triples and runs scored three times each. His 418 career steals with the team are the second most in franchise history, behind only Maury Wills's total of 490. Lopes became a coach for the Dodgers and five other teams between 1988 and 2017, including the 1998 pennant-winning San Diego Padres and the 2008 World Series champion Philadelphia Phillies, and he managed the Milwaukee Brewers from 2000 to 2002.

== Early years ==
David Earl Lopes was born on May 3, 1945, in East Providence, Rhode Island, and played baseball in high school at La Salle Academy in Providence. He played college baseball for Iowa Wesleyan College and Washburn University in Kansas. He also played college basketball for Washburn.

Lopes was selected by the San Francisco Giants in the eighth round of the 1967 amateur draft but did not sign. He was taken by the Los Angeles Dodgers in the second round of the 1968 January draft.

== Career ==
=== Playing ===
1974 card of Lopes for Los Angeles Dodgers

When Lopes started his career in the Dodger organization, he was an introvert, reserved and quiet. Tommy Lasorda encouraged him to assert himself more. According to Tommy John, "And as his confidence grew, Dave did just that, becoming outspoken, a catalyst, a leader. He was a guy whose blazing speed made things happen on the field and whose personality made things happen in the clubhouse. When something needed to be said to a teammate, even if it was critical, Lopes would be the guy to say it." Lasorda was also responsible for converting Lopes from an outfielder into a second baseman.

At age 27, Lopes made his major league debut for the Dodgers on September 22, 1972, against the rival Giants and was hitless in five at bats. Two days later, he recorded his first hit on a single to right field off of the Giants' Jim Barr. His first home run was hit on May 13, 1973, also against Barr.

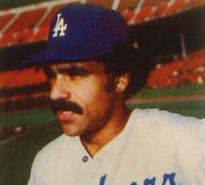
Lopes with the Dodgers

Lopes spent nine seasons with the Dodgers as their regular second baseman. Along with the rest of the starting infield, Steve Garvey (1B), Bill Russell (SS), and Ron Cey (3B), which stayed together for eight and a half seasons.

Used in the leadoff role most of his career, Lopes was one of the most effective base stealers in baseball's modern era. His 557 career stolen bases rank 26th all-time, but his success rate of 83.01% (557 steals in only 671 attempts) ranks 3rd-best all time among players with 400 or more career stolen bases (behind Tim Raines and Willie Wilson). In 1975, Lopes stole 38 consecutive bases without getting caught, breaking a 53-year-old record set by Max Carey. Lopes's record was later broken by Vince Coleman in 1989. Lopes led the National League with 77 steals in 1975, and again with 63 the following season. He won the Gold Glove Award for second basemen in 1978.

A rare blend of speed and power, Lopes hit a career-high 28 home runs in 1979, which tied Cey and Garvey for the team high. He also hit 17 home runs twice (1978 and 1983), appeared in four consecutive All-Star games from 1978 to 1981, played in one Division Series, six NLCS and four World Series, including as a member of the 1981 World Champion Dodgers. In the 1978 World Series, Lopes hit three home runs with seven runs batted in. In the 1981 playoffs, he set a then-single-season MLB postseason record of 10 stolen bases (in 10 attempts), broken by Rickey Henderson with 11 in 1989.

Before the 1982 season, the Dodgers sent Lopes to the Oakland Athletics (for minor leaguer Lance Hudson) to make room for rookie second baseman Steve Sax. With Oakland, Lopes teamed with Henderson to steal 158 bases, setting a new American League record for teammates. Henderson collected 130 and Lopes 28.

The Athletics traded Lopes to the Chicago Cubs on August 31, 1984, to complete an earlier deal for Chuck Rainey. He was then traded on July 21, 1986, to the Houston Astros for Frank DiPino. He stole 47 bases at the age of 40 and 25 at age 41, before retiring at the end of the 1987 season.

In a 16-season career, Lopes posted a .263 batting average with 155 home runs and 614 runs batted in in 1,812 games played.

=== Coaching ===
Following his retirement as a player, Lopes served as the bench coach for the Texas Rangers from 1989 to 1991. After leaving the Rangers, he coached first base for the Baltimore Orioles from 1992 to 1994 and the San Diego Padres from 1995 to 1999. Lopes was hired as the Milwaukee Brewers manager in 2000 following Bud Selig's recommendation to hire a manager with a minority background, becoming the manager for the team's last season at Milwaukee County Stadium, then their first season at Miller Park.

In 2001 Lopes was the target of controversy following statements he made regarding stolen-base king Rickey Henderson after he stole second base with his San Diego Padres up by seven runs. Lopes said that this violated an unwritten rule against "showing up" the opposing team. Lopes was quoted, "He was going on his ass. We were going to drill him." This was despite Henderson being removed for a pinch runner after the steal. Afterwards, Lopes said "Somebody might not be as lenient as I was, and drill the hitter that's next to him [in the lineup]." The day after, the Elias Sports Bureau produced a list of the seven times during Lopes's playing career that he had stolen a base while his team was leading by seven or more runs.

Tired of the Brewers' continued poor performance and Lopes's media and field antics, club management fired him as manager fifteen games into the 2002 season. He was 144–195 in three seasons with the Brewers.

Lopes rejoined the Padres as first base coach from 2003 to 2005 and then held the same position with the Washington Nationals in 2006 and the Philadelphia Phillies from 2007 to 2010. In each of his Lopes's three seasons with the Phillies, the team led the majors in stolen base percentage, including the best in major league history in 2007 – 87.9% (138-for-157). They finished second or third in total steals each of those seasons.

On November 22, 2010, he was named the first base coach for the Los Angeles Dodgers, a position he held through the 2015 season. On November 5, 2015, he was named the first base coach of the Washington Nationals. His contract expired after the 2017 season and he retired from professional baseball.

== Statistics ==
=== Playing career ===
Career hitting
G	AB	H	2B	3B	HR	R	RBI	SB	BB	SO	AVG	OBP	SLG	OPS
1,812	6,354	1,671	232	50	155	1,023	614	557	833	852	.263	.349	.388	.737

Defensively, Lopes recorded an overall .977 fielding percentage. His primary position was second base, but also played all three outfield positions, third base, and shortstop. In 50 postseason games, he posted a .238 batting average (43-for-181) with 29 runs, 3 doubles, 3 triples, 6 home runs, 22 runs batted in, 19 stolen bases, and 25 walks.

=== Managerial record ===
Team	From	To	Regular season record			Post–season record		
Team	From	To	W	L	Win %	W	L	Win %
Milwaukee Brewers	2000	2002	144	195	.425	—		

== Personal life and death ==
Lopes was of Cape Verdean and Irish descent. He has a recreation center named after him in Providence, Rhode Island.

He was diagnosed with prostate cancer following a routine physical in February 2008.

Lopes died in Rhode Island on April 8, 2026, at the age of 80, due to complications from Parkinson's disease.

== Highlights ==
- 4-time All-Star (1978–1981)
- First in the All-Star Game vote (1980)
- NL Gold Glove Award (1978)
- Twice led NL in stolen bases (1975–76)
- His career 557 stolen bases ranks him 26th in All-Time list as of 2026
- Ranks sixth in All-Time list as of with an 83% stolen base success rate
- Ranks second in Dodgers history with 413 steals behind Maury Wills (490)
- In the 1978 World Series against the Yankees, hit two home runs and drove in five runs in Game One, and added another home run in the sixth and final game.
- Tied an NL record with five stolen bases in a game (1974, since broken)

== See also ==
- List of Gold Glove Award winners at second base
- List of Major League Baseball annual stolen base leaders
- List of Major League Baseball career runs scored leaders
- List of Major League Baseball career stolen bases leaders
- List of Major League Baseball stolen base records

Sporting positions
Preceded by Curt Motton	Baltimore Orioles First Base coach 1992–1994	Succeeded by Al Bumbry
Preceded by Dan Radison	San Diego Padres First Base coach 1995–1999	Succeeded by Alan Trammell
Preceded by Alan Trammell	San Diego Padres First Base coach 2003–2005	Succeeded by Tye Waller
Preceded by Don Buford	Washington Nationals First Base coach 2006	Succeeded by Jerry Morales
Preceded by Marc Bombard	Philadelphia Phillies First Base coach 2007–2010	Succeeded by Sam Perlozzo
Preceded by Mariano Duncan	Los Angeles Dodgers First Base Coach; 2011–2015	Succeeded by George Lombard
Preceded by Tony Tarasco	Washington Nationals First Base coach 2016–2017	Succeeded by Tim Bogar
