= 1978 Chicago Cubs season =

1978 Chicago Cubs
- League: National League
- Division: East
- Ballpark: Wrigley Field
- City: Chicago
- Record: 79–83 (.488)
- Divisional place: 3rd
- Owners: William Wrigley III
- General managers: Bob Kennedy
- Managers: Herman Franks
- Television: WGN-TV (Jack Brickhouse, Lou Boudreau)
- Radio: WGN (Vince Lloyd, Lou Boudreau)
- Stats: ESPN.com; Baseball Reference

The 1978 Chicago Cubs season was the 107th season of the Chicago Cubs franchise, the 103rd in the National League and the 63rd at Wrigley Field. The Cubs finished third in the National League East with a record of 79–83.

== Offseason ==
- October 13, 1977: Keith Drumright was traded by the Cubs to the Houston Astros for Al Javier.
- October 31, 1977: Bill Bonham was traded by the Cubs to the Cincinnati Reds to the Chicago Cubs for Woodie Fryman and Bill Caudill.
- December 5, 1977: Dave Rosello was traded by the Cubs to the Cleveland Indians for Bruce Compton (minors) and Norm Churchill (minors).
- December 5, 1977: Jesús Figueroa was drafted by the Cubs from the New York Yankees in the 1977 rule 5 draft.

== Regular season ==
On June 14, in Cincinnati, Pete Rose of the Cincinnati Reds singled in the first inning off Cubs pitcher Dave Roberts; Rose would proceed to get a hit in every game he played until August 1.

=== Season standings ===
NL East
Team	W	L	Pct.	GB	Home	Road
Philadelphia Phillies	90	72	.556	—	54‍–‍28	36‍–‍44
Pittsburgh Pirates	88	73	.547	1½	55‍–‍26	33‍–‍47
Chicago Cubs	79	83	.488	11	44‍–‍38	35‍–‍45
Montreal Expos	76	86	.469	14	41‍–‍39	35‍–‍47
St. Louis Cardinals	69	93	.426	21	37‍–‍44	32‍–‍49
New York Mets	66	96	.407	24	33‍–‍47	33‍–‍49

=== Record vs. opponents ===
1978 National League record Sources:
Team	ATL	CHC	CIN	HOU	LAD	MON	NYM	PHI	PIT	SD	SF	STL
Atlanta	—	5–7	6–12	8–10	5–13	5–7	6–6	8–4	2–10	8–10	11–7	5–7
Chicago	7–5	—	7–5	6–6	4–8	7–11	11–7	4–14	7–11	7–5	4–8	15–3
Cincinnati	12–6	5–7	—	11–7	9–9	8–4	7–5	7–5	4–7	9–9	12–6	8–4
Houston	10–8	6–6	7–11	—	7–11	6–6	7–5	6–6	4–8	8–10	6–12	7–5
Los Angeles	13–5	8–4	9–9	11–7	—	8–4	7–5	7–5	7–5	9–9	11–7	5–7
Montreal	7–5	11–7	4–8	6–6	4–8	—	8–10	9–9	7–11	6–6	5–7	9–9
New York	6–6	7–11	5–7	5–7	5–7	10–8	—	6–12	7–11	5–7	3–9	7–11
Philadelphia	4-8	14–4	5–7	6–6	5–7	9–9	12–6	—	11–7	8–4	6–6	10–8
Pittsburgh	10–2	11–7	7–4	8–4	5–7	11–7	11–7	7–11	—	5–7	4–8	9–9
San Diego	10–8	5–7	9–9	10–8	9–9	6–6	7–5	4–8	7–5	—	8–10	9–3
San Francisco	7–11	8–4	6–12	12–6	7–11	7–5	9–3	6–6	8–4	10–8	—	9–3
St. Louis	7–5	3–15	4–8	5–7	7–5	9–9	11–7	8–10	9–9	3–9	3–9	—

=== Notable transactions ===
- June 6, 1978: Mike Diaz was drafted by the Cubs in the 30th round of the 1978 Major League Baseball draft.
- June 9, 1978: Woodie Fryman was traded by the Cubs to the Montreal Expos for a player to be named later. The Expos completed the deal by sending Jerry White to the Cubs on June 23.
- June 10, 1978: The Cubs traded a player to be named later to the New York Yankees for Ken Holtzman. The Cubs completed the trade by sending Ron Davis to the Yankees on June 12.
- June 15, 1978: Joe Wallis was traded by the Cubs to the Cleveland Indians for Mike Vail.
- June 26, 1978: Paul Reuschel was traded by the Cubs to the Cleveland Indians for Dennis DeBarr.

=== Roster ===
1978 Chicago Cubs
Roster
Pitchers: 34 Ray Burris; 35 Woodie Fryman; 46 Dave Geisel; 38 Willie Hernández; 30 Ken Holtzman; 39 Mike Krukow; 47 Dennis Lamp; 40 Lynn McGlothen; 49 Donnie Moore; 43 Paul Reuschel; 48 Rick Reuschel; 41 Dave Roberts; 37 Manny Seoane; 42 Bruce Sutter	Catchers: 9 Tim Blackwell; 6 Larry Cox; 23 Mike Gordon; 8 Dave Rader; Infielders: 26 Larry Biittner; 22 Bill Buckner; 11 Iván DeJesús; 31 Davey Johnson; 20 Mick Kelleher; 12 Rudy Meoli; 16 Steve Ontiveros; 17 Ed Putman; 24,32 Rodney Scott; 29 Mike Sember; 19 Manny Trillo	Outfielders: 18 Gene Clines; 24 Héctor Cruz; 21 Greg Gross; 10 Dave Kingman; 7 Bobby Murcer; 25 Scot Thompson; 27 Mike Vail; 9 Joe Wallis; 24,32 Jerry White; Other batters: 45 Karl Pagel	Manager: 3 Herman Franks; Coaches: 5 Joey Amalfitano; 45 Jack Bloomfield; 2 Peanuts Lowrey; 4 Mike Roarke; 1 Cookie Rojas

== Player stats ==
= Indicates team leader

=== Batting ===
==== Starters by position ====
Note: Pos = Position; G = Games played; AB = At bats; H = Hits; Avg. = Batting average; HR = Home runs; RBI = Runs batted in

Pos	Player	G	AB	H	Avg.	HR	RBI
C	Dave Rader	116	305	62	.203	3	36
1B	Bill Buckner	117	446	144	.323	5	74
2B	Manny Trillo	152	552	144	.261	4	55
3B	Steve Ontiveros	82	276	67	.243	1	22
SS	Iván DeJesús	160	619	172	.278	3	35
LF	Dave Kingman	119	395	105	.266	28	79
CF	Greg Gross	124	347	92	.265	1	39
RF	Bobby Murcer	146	499	140	.281	9	64

==== Other batters ====
Note: G = Games played; AB = At bats; H = Hits; Avg. = Batting average; HR = Home runs; RBI = Runs batted in

Player	G	AB	H	Avg.	HR	RBI
Larry Biittner	120	343	88	.257	4	50
Gene Clines	109	229	59	.258	0	17
Rodney Scott	78	227	64	.282	0	15
Mike Vail	74	180	60	.333	4	33
Jerry White	59	136	37	.272	1	10
Larry Cox	59	121	34	.281	2	18
Tim Blackwell	49	103	23	.223	0	7
Mick Kelleher	68	95	24	.253	0	6
Héctor Cruz	30	76	18	.237	2	9
Joe Wallis	28	55	17	.309	1	6
Davey Johnson	24	49	15	.306	2	6
Scot Thompson	19	36	15	.417	0	2
Rudy Meoli	47	29	3	.103	0	2
Ed Putman	17	25	5	.200	0	3
Mike Gordon	4	5	1	.200	0	0
Mike Sember	9	3	1	.333	0	0
Karl Pagel	2	2	0	.000	0	0

=== Pitching ===
==== Starting pitchers ====
Note: G = Games pitched; IP = Innings pitched; W = Wins; L = Losses; ERA = Earned run average; SO = Strikeouts

Player	G	IP	W	L	ERA	SO
Rick Reuschel	35	242.2	14	15	3.41	115
Dennis Lamp	37	223.2	7	15	3.30	73
Ray Burris	40	198.2	7	13	4.76	94
Mike Krukow	27	138.0	9	3	3.91	81

==== Other pitchers ====
Note: G = Games pitched; IP = Innings pitched; W = Wins; L = Losses; ERA = Earned run average; SO = Strikeouts

Player	G	IP	W	L	ERA	SO
Dave Roberts	35	142.1	6	8	5.25	54
Woodie Fryman	13	55.2	2	4	5.17	28
Ken Holtzman	23	53.0	0	3	6.11	36

==== Relief pitchers ====
Note: G = Games pitched; W = Wins; L = Losses; SV = Saves; ERA = Earned run average; SO = Strikeouts

Player	G	W	L	SV	ERA	SO
Bruce Sutter	64	8	10	27	3.19	106
Donnie Moore	71	9	7	4	4.11	50
Willie Hernández	54	8	2	3	3.77	38
Lynn McGlothen	49	5	3	0	3.04	60
Dave Geisel	18	1	0	0	4.24	15
Paul Reuschel	16	2	0	0	5.14	13
Manny Seoane	7	1	0	0	5.40	5

== Farm system ==
Level	Team	League	Manager
AAA	Wichita Aeros	American Association	Harry Dunlop
AA	Midland Cubs	Texas League	Jim Saul
A	Pompano Beach Cubs	Florida State League	Jack Hiatt
A-Short Season	Geneva Cubs	New York–Penn League	Bob Hartsfield
Rookie	GCL Cubs	Gulf Coast League	Randy Hundley

LEAGUE CHAMPIONS: Geneva
