= 1978 Houston Astros season =

17th season in Major League Baseball for the Houston Astros

1978 Houston Astros
- League: National League
- Division: West
- Ballpark: Astrodome
- City: Houston, Texas
- Record: 74–88 (.457)
- Divisional place: 5th
- Owners: General Electric, Ford Motor Company
- General managers: Tal Smith
- Managers: Bill Virdon
- Television: KPRC-TV
- Radio: KPRC (AM) (Gene Elston, Dewayne Staats)

The 1978 Houston Astros season was the 17th season for the Major League Baseball (MLB) franchise located in Houston, Texas, their 14th as the Astros, 17th in the National League (NL), tenth in the NL West division, and 14th at The Astrodome. The Astros entered the season having completed an 81–81 record for third place and 17 games behind the division-champion and NL pennant-winning Los Angeles Dodgers.

At Riverfront Stadium on April 6, J. R. Richard made his third of five consecutive Opening Day starts for Houston, who were defeated by the Cincinnati Reds, 11–9. The Astros' first round pick in the amateur draft was pitcher Rod Boxberger at 11th overall; in the second round, they chose outfielder Danny Heep.

Center fielder Terry Puhl was Astros' representative at the MLB All-Star Game and played for the National League, his lone career selection. Third baseman Eddie Mathews, who briefly played for Houston in 1967, became the second former Astro to be inducted into the Baseball Hall of Fame.

The Astros concluded the season fifth in the NL West with a record of 74–88, 21 games behind Los Angeles, who repeated as both division champions and NL pennant winners. J. R. Richard became the first right-handed pitcher in National League history to reach 300 strikeouts, as well as the first Houston Astros pitcher to lead the league, with 303.

== Offseason ==
- October 13, 1977: Al Javier was traded by the Astros to the Chicago Cubs for Keith Drumright.
- November 18, 1977: Oscar Zamora was signed as a free agent by the Astros.
- December 19, 1977: Jesús Alou was signed as a free agent by the Houston Astros.

== Regular season ==
=== Summary ===
==== April ====
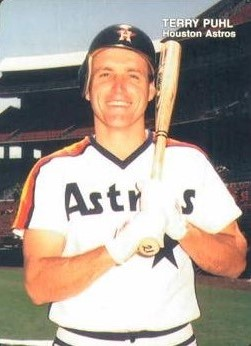
Leadoff hitter and '78 All-Star Terry Puhl

Opening Day starting lineup
Uniform	Player	Position
21	Terry Puhl	Left fielder
23	Enos Cabell	Third baseman
28	César Cedeño	Center fielder
25	José Cruz	Right fielder
27	Bob Watson	First baseman
13	Joe Ferguson	Catcher
18	Art Howe	Second baseman
14	Roger Metzger	Shortstop
50	J. R. Richard	Pitcher
Venue: Riverfront Stadium • Cincinnati 11, Houston 9 Sources:

The Astros turned their first triple play on an Opening Day on April 6, and third in club history, Though the contest began auspiciously for Houston, they fell to the Cincinnati Reds, 11–9, at Riverfront Stadium. Terry Puhl cranked a home run to lead off the game and season, and César Cedeño and Joe Ferguson joined Puhl with longballs. During the bottom of the seventh, Joe Sambito relieved and struck out Dan Driessen. On a botched double steal, Ferguson gunned down George Foster, while Joe Morgan was caught in a rundown between second and third base to turn the triple play. Cedeño hit his second career home run on Opening Day, while Ferguson did likewise for the second consecutive Opening Day.

On April 21, Houston turned another triple play at Dodger Stadium, marking their second instance to have turned two within the same season, (Note: July 16 and September 17, 1971.) while being the first to occur within the same month. Simulating a Hollywood ending, the Dodgers had led during the top of the eighth inning, 6 to 5, when catcher Joe Ferguson cranked a three-run home run to put Houston ahead, 8 to 6. Ken Forsch pitched the bottom of the ninth, and Bill Russell and Reggie Smith both singled, resulting in runners on first and second for Ron Cey. Cey slashed a liner to Bob Watson, which he snagged, stepped on first, and spun and rifled the ball to Roger Metzger. Metzger raced ahead of Russell to the bag to effectuate their trifecta, and ice an 8–6 triumph over the Los Angeles.

==== May ====
On May 20, José Cruz got the Astros off to fast start with a two-run first-inning bomb as they lifted off on the Atlanta Braves, 13–0. Cruz never looked back, capturing both career highs of four hits and six runs batted in (RBI), and added a stolen base. Denny Walling connected for his first major league home run, and added three RBI. Enos Cabell collected three hits as Astros hitters struck out just once. In his second straight shutout, J. R. Richard was brilliant, striking out 8 to furnish a game score of 80, while, at the plate, he added a hit, run scored and an RBI.

For the week ended May 21, J. R. Richard hurled two complete game shutouts, winning both decisions with six hits and, in spite of, ten bases on balls surrendered, to go with 17 strikeouts landed. Hence, Richard was credited with the NL Player of the Week accolade.

Three wild pitches in one inning on May 30 marred an otherwise gem of an outing by J. R. Richard. The temporary fluctuation in control set up the lone run of the contest to score as the San Francisco Giants prevailed over Houston, 1–0.

==== June ====
In spite of setting a new record as a team with 7 errors on June 12, the Astros' Jesús Alou hit a leadoff double to start a rally in the top of the eighth inning. The Astros followed with six runs scored that led to 6–5 win over the Pittsburgh Pirates.

On June 9, Cruz tripled twice for the only time in career, attained his fifth career four-hit game, and third with five RBI. He also pilfered a base. Cruz' final safety was a bases-loaded triple which extended the lead to 11–5 during the top of the eighth. Art Howe and Denny Walling each added a pair of RBI, while César Cedeño stroked three hits and stole a bag. Meanwhile, J. R. Richard (5–6) qualified for a victory though he surrendered 5 hits, 6 walks, and 5 runs to the St. Louis Cardinals in 5 1/3 frames in an 11–7 Houston triumph. Twelve of his 16 outs were whiffs. Ken Forsch entered during the bottom of the eighth and extinguished a Cardinals threat with two runs in, while retiring four of five batters faced to earn a third save.

==== July ====
Knuckleballer Joe Niekro started against the Philadelphia Philles on July 17, opposing Larry Christenson. Niekro pitched an 11-inning complete game, struck out eight, surrendered five hits and one run for a game score of 88. During the bottom of the 11th inning, José Cruz led off against Rawly Eastwick, and blasted Eastwick's first offering for a walk-off home run, his fifth longball and eighth game-winning hit of the campaign. Cruz' blast furnished a 2–1 Astros' triumph while punctuating the victory for Niekro in his marathon bout. The 11 innings represented a career-high for Niekro.

On July 31, Niekro fired a two-hit, one-run complete game victory, his lowest-hit complete-game outing since a one-hit shutout masterpiece on July 2, 1970, as a member of the Detroit Tigers.

For the month of July, right-hander J. R. Richard recorded a 4–0 win–loss record (W–L), 1.29 earned run average (ERA) and four complete games over six starts. In 56 inning pitched, Richard allowed 30 hits, 11 runs, 2 home runs, 23 BB, a 0.946 walks plus hits per inning pitched (WHIP) with 58 strikeouts. This performance netted Richard with commendation as NL Pitcher of the Month, the first-ever Astros moundsman so recognized.

==== August ====
During an 8–3 victory over the Chicago Cubs on August 21, J. R. Richard procured his 236th whiff to pass Don Wilson for the Astros' single-season strikeout record (1969). The strikeout victim was Tim Blackwell during the top of the seventh inning. Later in the inning, Bill Buckner singled home two Cubs, and Greg Gross scored on a wild pitch. Richard (13–11) earned the victory with a quality start (7 2/3 IP, 3 ER, 4 BB, 6 K). Meanwhile, José Cruz homered, going 4-for-4 with 4 RBI.

==== September ====
From September 4 to 10, José Cruz went 11-for-23 for a .478 batting average, with four doubles, three RBI, and three stolen bases. Cruz was named NL Player of the Week.

Richard surpassed Tom Seaver's record of 289 strikeouts on September 19, by whiffing the Braves' Bob Horner on a 1–2 offering in the seventh inning. The strikeout set the record for right-handers in the National League.

Niekro whiffed a career-high 11 on September 20, during a nine-inning complete game; however, Niekro (12–14) suffered the defeat as the Atlanta Braves. Glenn Hubbard singled in pinch runner Eddie Miller for the go-ahead tally.

On September 28, J. R. Richard recorded his 300th strikeout of the season in a 4–3 win over the Braves, tallying six whiffs to get to 303. Richard became the first right-handed pitcher in National League history to achieve this milestone in one season, He also homered in the third inning off Larry McWilliams. The Astros rallied to win in the seventh inning with a double by Reggie Baldwin and a single by Rafael Landestoy.

==== Performance overview ====
The Astros concluded the 1978 season 74–88 (.457) performance, in fifth place in the NL West, and trailing the NL pennant-winning Dodgers by 21 games. This represented a decline in performance by 7 wins and a drop from third place in the standings, from the year prior.

With 303 whiffs, J. R. Richard became the premier Astros pitcher to lead the league in strikeouts, and the first to reach 300-plus while establishing a new club record, supplanting the 235 by Don Wilson in 1969. Moreover, Richard become Houston's first three-time 200-strikeout moundsman (214 each in 1976 and 1977). (Note: For single seasons, playing for HOU, in the regular season, requiring strikeouts ≥ 200, sorted by ascending season.) For the second consecutive season, Richard led the NL in hits per nine innings (6.278 H/9), the third time by an Astros pitcher. Richard's 56 wins also led NL right-handers over the previous three seasons. Richard also led the NL for the second consecutive season with 151 free passes, the first Astros hurler to do so. Jerry Reuss became the first Astros pitcher to lead the league in walks in 1973.

Enos Cabell became the first Astro to play the full 162-game schedule, while establishing other single-season franchise records. including hits (195) and at bats (660). His hits record stood until 1998 when Craig Biggio collected 210. Hence, Cabell was named the Houston Astros' team Most Valuable Player (MVP).

José Cruz was the only National League batter with as many as two walk-off home runs in 1978. (Note: Eddie Murray (Baltimore) was the only player who hit as many as three. All: 54 home runs in 1978 – walk-off)

=== League standings ===
==== National League West ====
NL West
Team	W	L	Pct.	GB	Home	Road
Los Angeles Dodgers	95	67	.586	—	54‍–‍27	41‍–‍40
Cincinnati Reds	92	69	.571	2½	49‍–‍31	43‍–‍38
San Francisco Giants	89	73	.549	6	50‍–‍31	39‍–‍42
San Diego Padres	84	78	.519	11	50‍–‍31	34‍–‍47
Houston Astros	74	88	.457	21	50‍–‍31	24‍–‍57
Atlanta Braves	69	93	.426	26	39‍–‍42	30‍–‍51

==== Record versus opponents ====
National League

1978 National League record Sources:
Team	ATL	CHC	CIN	HOU	LAD	MON	NYM	PHI	PIT	SD	SF	STL
Atlanta	—	5–7	6–12	8–10	5–13	5–7	6–6	8–4	2–10	8–10	11–7	5–7
Chicago	7–5	—	7–5	6–6	4–8	7–11	11–7	4–14	7–11	7–5	4–8	15–3
Cincinnati	12–6	5–7	—	11–7	9–9	8–4	7–5	7–5	4–7	9–9	12–6	8–4
Houston	10–8	6–6	7–11	—	7–11	6–6	7–5	6–6	4–8	8–10	6–12	7–5
Los Angeles	13–5	8–4	9–9	11–7	—	8–4	7–5	7–5	7–5	9–9	11–7	5–7
Montreal	7–5	11–7	4–8	6–6	4–8	—	8–10	9–9	7–11	6–6	5–7	9–9
New York	6–6	7–11	5–7	5–7	5–7	10–8	—	6–12	7–11	5–7	3–9	7–11
Philadelphia	4-8	14–4	5–7	6–6	5–7	9–9	12–6	—	11–7	8–4	6–6	10–8
Pittsburgh	10–2	11–7	7–4	8–4	5–7	11–7	11–7	7–11	—	5–7	4–8	9–9
San Diego	10–8	5–7	9–9	10–8	9–9	6–6	7–5	4–8	7–5	—	8–10	9–3
San Francisco	7–11	8–4	6–12	12–6	7–11	7–5	9–3	6–6	8–4	10–8	—	9–3
St. Louis	7–5	3–15	4–8	5–7	7–5	9–9	11–7	8–10	9–9	3–9	3–9	—

=== Notable transactions ===
- April 6, 1978: Bob Coluccio was signed as a free agent by the Astros.
- June 6, 1978: Danny Heep was drafted by the Astros in the 2nd round of the 1978 Major League Baseball draft.
- June 8, 1978: Bob Coluccio was traded by the Astros to the St. Louis Cardinals for Frank Riccelli.
- September 2, 1978: Dan Larson was traded by the Astros to the Philadelphia Phillies for Dan Warthen.
- September 5, 1978: Gene Pentz was released by the Astros.

=== Roster ===
1978 Houston Astros
Roster
Pitchers: 47 Joaquín Andújar; 38 Floyd Bannister; 37 Tom Dixon; 43 Ken Forsch; 42 Mark Lemongello; 39 Bo McLaughlin; 36 Joe Niekro; 30 Gene Pentz; 45 Frank Riccelli; 50 J. R. Richard; 48 Vern Ruhle; 35 Joe Sambito; 31 Dan Warthen; 34 Rick Williams; 44 Oscar Zamora	Catchers: 6 Reggie Baldwin; 13 Bruce Bochy; 13 Joe Ferguson; 8 Ed Herrmann; 8 Luis Pujols; Infielders: 16 Dave Bergman; 23 Enos Cabell; 15 Keith Drumright; 10 Mike Fischlin; 9 Julio González; 18 Art Howe; 17 Rafael Landestoy; 14 Roger Metzger; 19 Jim Obradovich; 24 Jimmy Sexton; 27 Bob Watson	Outfielders: 22 Jesús Alou; 20 Joe Cannon; 28 César Cedeño; 25 José Cruz; 26 Wilbur Howard; 46 Jeffrey Leonard; 21 Terry Puhl; 29 Denny Walling	Manager: 7 Bill Virdon; Coaches: 4 Deacon Jones; 5 Bob Lillis; 3 Tony Pacheco; 2 Mel Wright

== Game log ==
=== Regular season ===
Legend
	Astros win
	Astros loss
	Postponement
	Eliminated from playoff race
**Bold**	Astros team member

1978 regular season game log: 74–88 (Home: 46–35; Away: 35–46)
April: 10–12 (Home: 7–5; Away: 3–7)

#	Date	Time (CT)	Opponent	Score	Win	Loss	Save	Time of Game	Attendance	Record	Box/ Streak
1	April 6		@ Reds								
2	April 7		@ Reds								
3	April 8		@ Reds								
4	April 9		@ Reds								
5	April 10		Dodgers								
6	April 11		Dodgers								
7	April 12		Dodgers								
8	April 14		Reds								
9	April 15		Reds								
10	April 16		Reds								
13	April 20		@ Dodgers								
14	April 21		@ Dodgers								
15	April 22		@ Dodgers								
16	April 23		@ Dodgers								

May: 10–13 (Home: 7–6; Away: 3–7)

#	Date	Time (CT)	Opponent	Score	Win	Loss	Save	Time of Game	Attendance	Record	Box/ Streak

June: 13–14 (Home: 9–6; Away: 4–8)

#	Date	Time (CT)	Opponent	Score	Win	Loss	Save	Time of Game	Attendance	Record	Box/ Streak
—	June 7		@ Pirates	**Postponed (Rain)** (Makeup date: August 17)							
—	June 8		@ Pirates	**Postponed (Rain)** (Makeup date: August 20)							
55	June 12		Pirates								
56	June 13		Pirates								
57	June 14		Pirates								
61	June 20		@ Dodgers								
62	June 21		@ Dodgers								
63	June 22		@ Dodgers								
68	June 26		Reds								
69	June 27		Reds								
70	June 28		Reds								
71	June 29		Reds								

July: 15–17 (Home: 11–5; Away: 4–12)

#	Date	Time (CT)	Opponent	Score	Win	Loss	Save	Time of Game	Attendance	Record	Box/ Streak
76	July 3		@ Reds								
77	July 4		@ Reds								
78	July 5		@ Reds								
79	July 7		Dodgers								
80 (1)	July 8		Dodgers								
81 (2)	July 8		Dodgers								
82	July 9		Dodgers								
—	July 11	7:40 p.m. CDT	**49th All-Star Game in San Diego, CA**								

August: 14–14 (Home: 9–4; Away: 5–10)

#	Date	Time (CT)	Opponent	Score	Win	Loss	Save	Time of Game	Attendance	Record	Box/ Streak
119 (1)	August 17		@ Pirates								
120 (2)	August 17		@ Pirates								
121	August 18		@ Pirates								
122	August 19		@ Pirates								
123 (1)	August 20		@ Pirates								
124 (2)	August 20		@ Pirates								
128	August 25		Pirates								
129	August 26		Pirates								
130	August 27		Pirates								

September: 11–18 (Home: 6–5; Away: 5–13)

#	Date	Time (CT)	Opponent	Score	Win	Loss	Save	Time of Game	Attendance	Record	Box/ Streak
137	September 4		Reds								
138	September 5		Reds								
139	September 7		Dodgers								
1406	September 8		Dodgers								
143	September 11		@ Reds								
144	September 12		@ Reds								
145	September 13		@ Dodgers								
146	September 14		@ Dodgers								

October: 1–0 (Home: 1–0; Away: 0–0)

#	Date	Time (CT)	Opponent	Score	Win	Loss	Save	Time of Game	Attendance	Record	Box/ Streak

=== Detailed records ===
National League
Opponent	W	L	WP	RS	RA
NL East
Pittsburgh Pirates	4	8	0.333	46	52
Div Total	4	8	0.333	46	52
NL West
Cincinnati Reds	7	11	0.389	77	79
**Houston Astros**					
Los Angeles Dodgers	7	11	0.389	63	82
Div Total	14	22	0.389	140	161
Season Total	11	19	0.367	186	213

Month	Games	Won	Lost	Win %	RS	RA
April
May
June
July
August
September
October
Total

	Games	Won	Lost	Win %	RS	RA
Home
Away
Total

== Player stats ==
=== Batting ===
==== Starters by position ====
Note: Pos = Position; G = Games played; AB = At bats; H = Hits; Avg. = Batting average; HR = Home runs; RBI = Runs batted in

Pos	Player	G	AB	H	Avg.	HR	RBI
C	Joe Ferguson	51	150	31	.207	7	22
1B	Bob Watson	139	461	133	.289	14	79
2B	Art Howe	119	420	123	.293	7	55
SS	Rafael Landestoy	59	218	58	.266	0	9
3B	Enos Cabell	162	660	195	.295	7	71
LF	Denny Walling	120	247	62	.251	3	36
CF	Terry Puhl	149	585	169	.289	3	35
RF	José Cruz	153	565	178	.315	10	83

==== Other batters ====
Note: G = Games played; AB = At bats; H = Hits; Avg. = Batting average; HR = Home runs; RBI = Runs batted in

Player	G	AB	H	Avg.	HR	RBI
Julio González	78	223	52	.233	1	16
César Cedeño	50	192	54	.281	7	23
Dave Bergman	104	186	43	.231	0	12
Bruce Bochy	54	154	41	.266	3	15
Luis Pujols	56	153	20	.131	1	11
Wilbur Howard	84	148	34	.230	1	13
Jimmy Sexton	88	141	29	.206	2	6
Jesús Alou	77	139	45	.312	2	19
Roger Metzger	45	123	27	.220	0	6
Mike Fischlin	44	86	10	.116	0	0
Reggie Baldwin	38	67	17	.254	1	11
Keith Drumright	17	55	9	.164	0	2
Ed Herrmann	16	36	4	.111	0	0
Jeffrey Leonard	8	26	10	.385	0	4
Joe Cannon	8	18	4	.222	0	1
Jim Obradovich	10	17	3	.176	0	2

=== Pitching ===
= Indicates league leader

==== Starting pitchers ====
Note: G = Games pitched; IP = Innings pitched; W = Wins; L = Losses; ERA = Earned run average; SO = Strikeouts

Player	G	IP	W	L	ERA	SO
J. R. Richard	36	275.0	18	11	3.11	303
Mark Lemongello	33	210.1	9	14	3.94	77
Joe Niekro	35	202.2	14	14	3.86	97
Vern Ruhle	13	68.0	3	3	2.12	27

==== Other pitchers ====
Note: G = Games pitched; IP = Innings pitched; W = Wins; L = Losses; ERA = Earned run average; SO = Strikeouts

Player	G	IP	W	L	ERA	SO
Tom Dixon	30	140.0	7	11	3.99	66
Joaquín Andújar	35	110.2	5	7	3.42	55
Floyd Bannister	28	110.1	3	9	4.81	94
Dan Warthen	5	10.2	0	1	4.22	2

==== Relief pitchers ====
Note: G = Games pitched; W = Wins; L = Losses; SV = Saves; ERA = Earned run average; SO = Strikeouts

Player	G	W	L	SV	ERA	SO
Joe Sambito	62	4	9	11	3.07	96
Ken Forsch	52	10	6	7	2.70	71
Rick Williams	17	1	2	0	4.67	17
Bo McLaughlin	12	0	1	2	5.01	10
Gene Pentz	10	0	0	0	6.00	8
Oscar Zamora	10	0	0	0	7.20	6
Frank Riccelli	2	0	0	0	0.00	2

== Awards and achievements ==
=== Pitching achievements ===
==== Strikeout milestone ====
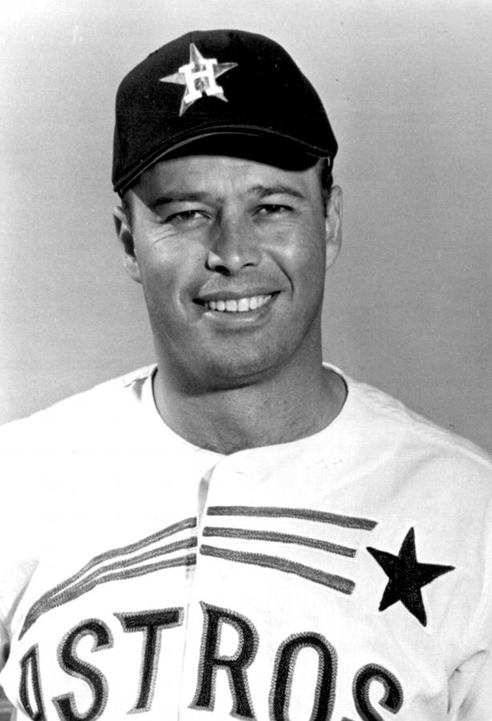
Photocard of Eddie Mathews as a member of the Astros in 1967.

300 strikeout club
Player	K	W–L	ERA	K/9
J. R. Richard	303	18–11	3.11	9.9

=== Career honors ===
Astros elected to Baseball Hall of Fame
Individual	Position	Houston Astros career					Induction	
Individual	Position	Uni.	Seasons	Games	Start	Finish	Induction	
Eddie Mathews	Third baseman	11	1	101	1967		Class	Plaque
See also: Members of the Baseball Hall of Fame • Sources:

=== Annual awards ===
1978 Houston Astros award winners
Name of award		Recipient	Ref.
Houston Astros Most Valuable Player (MVP)		Enos Cabell	
MLB All-Star Game	Reserve outfielder	Terry Puhl	
National League (NL) Pitcher of the Month	July	J. R. Richard	
National League (NL) Player of the Week	May 21	J. R. Richard	
National League (NL) Player of the Week	September 10	José Cruz	

Other awards results

Name of award	Voting recipient(s) (Team)	Ref.
NL Cy Young	1st—Perry (SDP) • 4th—Richard (HOU)	
NL Most Valuable Player	1st—Parker (PIT) • 22nd—Cabell (HOU)	

=== League leaders ===
Batting leaders

- At bats: Enos Cabell (660)
- Games played: Enos Cabell (162)
- Stolen base percentage: César Cedeño (92.00)

Pitching leaders

- Bases on balls: J. R. Richard (141)
- Fielding Independent Pitching: J. R. Richard (2.51)
- Hits per nine innings: J. R. Richard (6.3)
- Strikeouts: J. R. Richard (303)—major league leader
- Strikeouts per nine innings: J. R. Richard (9.9)
- Wild pitches: J. R. Richard (16)—major league leader

=== Other ===
1978 grand slams
No.	Date	Astros batter	Venue	Inning	Pitcher	Opposing team	Box
None (Note: Houston's first season without a grand slam since 1967.)

== See also ==
- 300 strikeout club
- List of Major League Baseball annual strikeout leaders

== Minor league system ==
Level	Team	League	Manager
AAA	Charleston Charlies	International League	Jim Beauchamp
AA	Columbus Astros	Southern League	Jimmy Johnson
A	Daytona Beach Astros	Florida State League	Leo Posada and Chuck Sprinkle
Rookie	GCL Astros	Gulf Coast League	Julio Linares
