= Phil Nastu =

American baseball player (born 1955)

- Pitcher
- Born: March 8, 1955 (age 70); Bridgeport, Connecticut, U.S.
- Batted: Left Threw: Left

MLB debut
- September 15, 1978, for the San Francisco Giants

Last MLB appearance
- October 3, 1980, for the San Francisco Giants

MLB statistics
- Win–loss record: 3–5
- Earned run average: 4.50
- Strikeouts: 53
- Stats at Baseball Reference

Teams
- San Francisco Giants (1978–1980)

Philip Nastu (born March 8, 1955) is an American former professional baseball pitcher. He played in Major League Baseball (MLB) from 1978 through 1980 for the San Francisco Giants.

Born in Bridgeport, Connecticut, Nastu attended Bassick High School and the University of Bridgeport before being signed by the Giants as free agent in 1976.

Nastu began his professional pitching career in 1977 with the Cedar Rapids Giants of the Midwest League and the Waterbury Giants of the Eastern League. The next season, he was promoted to the AAA Phoenix Giants of the Pacific Coast League.

As a September call-up, Nastu made his MLB debut on September 15, 1978, when the Giants hosted the Cincinnati Reds at Candlestick Park. He pitched the final two innings in the 6–1 loss; although he surrendered a single and walk, no runs scored. His first decision, a loss, came on October 1 (the final game of the season) when the Houston Astros shutout the Giants, 3–0, in the Astrodome. Starting the game, he gave up runs in the first 3 innings before being removed for a pinch hitter in the 5th inning.

Although Nastu began the 1979 season back with AAA Phoenix, he was recalled to the majors when John Montefusco was placed on the disabled list in late April. The season was the high-mark of his MLB career when he appeared in 25 games (14 as a starter) pitching 100 innings. After his call-up, he was the starting pitcher on April 30 at the Philadelphia Phillies but lost the 4–1 game, pitching 4 1/3 innings. On May 10 he also suffered the 3–0 loss after he gave up a 1st inning home run to the visiting Montreal Expos' Rodney Scott, who only hit 3 in his MLB career. His first victory came on May 15 at the same site as his first career loss when the Giants defeated the Astros, 8–1; pitching his only career complete game, he scattered 5 hits en route to the victory. His second victory came 9 days later hosting the Reds; with the visitors committing 4 errors, Nastu and the Giants posted a 2–1 victory. He suffered his third loss of the season on May 28 while hosting the Atlanta Braves; although he pitched eight innings, the Giants were defeated 4–1.

Again in 1980, Nastu opened the season with AAA Phoenix before being recalled in September. Used sparingly, he appeared in only 6 games, pitching six innings, finishing his MLB career on October 3, 1980. In the off season, he was traded along with infielder Joe Strain to the Chicago Cubs in exchange for outfielders Jesús Figueroa and Jerry Martin, and minor league infielder/outfielder Mike Turgeon as a player to be named later.

Nastu's last professional appearances came in 1981 and 1982 when he played for the Midland Cubs, the AA affiliate of the Chicago Cubs in the Texas League, and the Charlotte O's, the AA affiliate of the Baltimore Orioles in the Southern League.
