= 1978 Major League Baseball All-Star Game =

1978 American baseball competition

	1	2	3	4	5	6	7	8	9	R	H	E
American League	2	0	1	0	0	0	0	0	0	3	8	1
National League	0	0	3	0	0	0	0	4	X	7	10	0
- Date: July 11, 1978
- Venue: San Diego Stadium
- City: San Diego
- Managers: Billy Martin (NYY); Tommy Lasorda (LA)
- MVP: Steve Garvey (LA)
- Attendance: 51,549
- Ceremonial first pitch: Ray Kroc
- Television: ABC
- TV announcers: Keith Jackson, Howard Cosell and Don Drysdale
- Radio: CBS
- Radio announcers: Vin Scully, Brent Musburger and Jerry Coleman

The 1978 Major League Baseball All-Star Game was the 49th midseason exhibition between the all-stars of the American League (AL) and the National League (NL), the two leagues comprising Major League Baseball. The game was played on July 11, 1978, at San Diego Stadium in San Diego, home of the San Diego Padres of the National League. The game resulted in a 7–3 victory for the NL.

This was the first All-Star Game to be played in San Diego. It would return in 1992 to be played in the same stadium, though it was renamed Jack Murphy Stadium by that time.

The honorary captains were Brooks Robinson (for the AL) and Eddie Mathews (for the NL).

== American League roster ==
The American League roster included 9 future Hall of Fame players, denoted by italics.

=== Elected starters ===
Position	Player	Team	Notes
C	Carlton Fisk	Boston Red Sox
1B	Rod Carew	Minnesota Twins
2B	Don Money	Milwaukee Brewers
3B	George Brett	Kansas City Royals
SS	Freddie Patek	Kansas City Royals
OF	Reggie Jackson	New York Yankees	did not play
OF	Jim Rice	Boston Red Sox
OF	Richie Zisk	Texas Rangers

=== Pitchers ===
Throws	Pitcher	Team	Notes
LH	Mike Flanagan	Baltimore Orioles	did not pitch
RH	Goose Gossage	New York Yankees
LH	Ron Guidry	New York Yankees
RH	Matt Keough	Oakland Athletics
RH	Jim Kern	Cleveland Indians
RH	Jim Palmer	Baltimore Orioles	starting pitcher
RH	Lary Sorensen	Milwaukee Brewers
LH	Frank Tanana	California Angels	did not pitch

=== Reserve position players ===
Position	Player	Team	Notes
C	Thurman Munson	New York Yankees	injured
C	Darrell Porter	Kansas City Royals
1B	Eddie Murray	Baltimore Orioles	did not play
1B	Jason Thompson	Detroit Tigers
2B	Jerry Remy	Boston Red Sox	did not play
2B	Frank White	Kansas City Royals
3B	Roy Howell	Toronto Blue Jays
3B	Graig Nettles	New York Yankees
SS	Rick Burleson	Boston Red Sox	injured
SS	Craig Reynolds	Seattle Mariners
OF	Dwight Evans	Boston Red Sox
OF	Larry Hisle	Milwaukee Brewers
OF	Chet Lemon	Chicago White Sox
OF	Fred Lynn	Boston Red Sox	started for Jackson
OF	Carl Yastrzemski	Boston Red Sox	injured

=== Coaching staff ===
Position	Manager	Team
Manager	Billy Martin	New York Yankees
Coach	Whitey Herzog	Kansas City Royals
Coach	Don Zimmer	Boston Red Sox
Trainer	Dick Martin	Minnesota Twins

== National League roster ==
The National League roster included 8 future Hall of Fame players, denoted by italics.

=== Elected starters ===
Position	Player	Team	Notes
C	Johnny Bench	Cincinnati Reds	injured
1B	Steve Garvey	Los Angeles Dodgers	MVP
2B	Joe Morgan	Cincinnati Reds
3B	Pete Rose	Cincinnati Reds
SS	Larry Bowa	Philadelphia Phillies
OF	George Foster	Cincinnati Reds
OF	Greg Luzinski	Philadelphia Phillies
OF	Rick Monday	Los Angeles Dodgers

=== Pitchers ===
Throws	Pitcher	Team	Notes
LH	Vida Blue	San Francisco Giants	starting pitcher
RH	Rollie Fingers	San Diego Padres
LH	Ross Grimsley	Montreal Expos	did not pitch
LH	Tommy John	Los Angeles Dodgers	did not pitch
RH	Phil Niekro	Atlanta Braves
RH	Steve Rogers	Montreal Expos
RH	Tom Seaver	Cincinnati Reds	did not pitch
RH	Bruce Sutter	Chicago Cubs
RH	Pat Zachry	New York Mets	did not pitch

=== Reserve position players ===
Position	Player	Team	Notes
C	Bob Boone	Philadelphia Phillies
C	Biff Pocoroba	Atlanta Braves
C	Ted Simmons	St. Louis Cardinals	started for Bench
1B	Willie Stargell	Pittsburgh Pirates
2B	Davey Lopes	Los Angeles Dodgers
3B	Ron Cey	Los Angeles Dodgers
SS	Dave Concepción	Cincinnati Reds
OF	Jeff Burroughs	Atlanta Braves	did not play
OF	Jack Clark	San Francisco Giants
OF	Terry Puhl	Houston Astros	did not play
OF	Reggie Smith	Los Angeles Dodgers
OF	Dave Winfield	San Diego Padres

=== Coaching staff ===
Position	Manager	Team
Manager	Tommy Lasorda	Los Angeles Dodgers
Coach	Danny Ozark	Philadelphia Phillies
Coach	Chuck Tanner	Pittsburgh Pirates

== Game ==
=== Umpires ===
Position	Umpire
Home Plate	Paul Pryor (NL)
First Base	Nestor Chylak (AL)
Second Base	Terry Tata (NL)
Third Base	Bill Deegan (AL)
Left Field	Paul Runge (NL)
Right Field	Larry McCoy (AL)

=== Starting lineups ===
While the starters were elected by the fans, the batting orders and starting pitchers were selected by the managers.

American League				National League			
Order	Player	Team	Position	Order	Player	Team	Position
1	Rod Carew	Minnesota Twins	1B	1	Pete Rose	Cincinnati Reds	3B
2	George Brett	Kansas City Royals	3B	2	Joe Morgan	Cincinnati Reds	2B
3	Jim Rice	Boston Red Sox	LF	3	George Foster	Cincinnati Reds	CF
4	Richie Zisk	Texas Rangers	RF	4	Greg Luzinski	Philadelphia Phillies	LF
5	Carlton Fisk	Boston Red Sox	C	5	Steve Garvey	Los Angeles Dodgers	1B
6	Fred Lynn	Boston Red Sox	CF	6	Ted Simmons	St. Louis Cardinals	C
7	Don Money	Milwaukee Brewers	2B	7	Rick Monday	Los Angeles Dodgers	RF
8	Freddie Patek	Kansas City Royals	SS	8	Larry Bowa	Philadelphia Phillies	SS
9	Jim Palmer	Baltimore Orioles	P	9	Vida Blue	San Francisco Giants	P

=== Game summary ===
Tuesday, July 11, 1978 5:30 pm (PT) at San Diego Stadium in San Diego
Team	1	2	3	4	5	6	7	8	9	R	H	E
American League	2	0	1	0	0	0	0	0	0	3	8	1
National League	0	0	3	0	0	0	0	4	X	7	10	0
WP: Bruce Sutter (1-0) LP: Goose Gossage (0-1)

The American League opened the scoring immediately off of NL starter Vida Blue. Rod Carew tripled, and scored when George Brett doubled. Brett advanced to third base on a Jim Rice ground out. Richie Zisk walked. Fisk hit a sacrifice fly to Joe Morgan, permitting Brett to score.

The AL added another run in the top of the third inning, again started by a Rod Carew lead off triple. George Brett followed up with a sacrifice fly to George Foster that allowed Carew to score and extend the AL lead to 3–0.

The lead was short lived as the NL tied the game in the bottom of the third inning. Larry Bowa singled. With Reggie Smith pinch hitting for Vida Blue, Bowa stole second base. Smith struck out. Pete Rose grounded out, moving Bowa to third base. Joe Morgan walked. George Foster walked, pushing Morgan to second base; loading the bases. Greg Luzinski walked sending Foster to second base, Morgan to third base, and scoring Bowa. Steve Garvey singled, scoring Morgan and Foster, and sending Luzinski to second base. AL manager Billy Martin replaced starting pitcher Jim Palmer with relief pitcher Matt Keough, though no further scoring occurred.

The score remained tied at three until the bottom of the eighth inning, when Goose Gossage came in to pitch for the AL. Steve Garvey led off the inning with a triple, and scored when Gossage threw a wild pitch with Dave Concepción batting. Concepción walked. Dave Winfield singled sending Concepción to third, with Winfield advancing to second on an error by Chet Lemon. Bob Boone singled, scoring Concepción and Winfield. Boone advanced to second when Ron Cey grounded out. Davey Lopes singled, scoring Boone and ending the scoring for a 7–3 NL victory.

== Game notes and records ==
Bruce Sutter was credited with the win. Goose Gossage was charged with the loss.

The two triples hit by Rod Carew, and the one hit by Steve Garvey marked the first time that three triples had been hit in a single All-Star Game.
