= 1978 San Francisco Giants season =

1978 San Francisco Giants
- League: National League
- Division: West
- Ballpark: Candlestick Park
- City: San Francisco, California
- Owners: Bob Lurie
- General managers: Spec Richardson
- Managers: Joe Altobelli
- Television: KTVU (Lon Simmons, Gary Park)
- Radio: KSFO (Lon Simmons, Joe Angel)

The 1978 San Francisco Giants season was the Giants' 96th season in Major League Baseball, their 21st season in San Francisco since their move from New York following the 1957 season, and their 19th at Candlestick Park. The team finished in third place in the National League West with an 89–73 record, 6 games behind the Los Angeles Dodgers.

== Offseason ==
- October 25, 1977: Frank Riccelli was traded by the Giants to the St. Louis Cardinals for a player to be named later. The Cardinals completed the deal by sending Jim Dwyer to the Giants on June 15, 1978.
- March 15, 1978: Gary Alexander, Gary Thomasson, Dave Heaverlo, Alan Wirth, John Henry Johnson, Phil Huffman, a player to be named later, and $300,000 were traded by the Giants to the Oakland Athletics for Vida Blue. The Giants completed the trade by sending Mario Guerrero to the Athletics on April 7.
- March 21, 1978: Alan Hargesheimer was signed as an amateur free agent by the Giants.
- March 27, 1978: Randy Elliott was released by the Giants.

== Regular season ==
The Giants won 42 games by a one run margin, an MLB record.

=== Season standings ===
NL West
Team	W	L	Pct.	GB	Home	Road
Los Angeles Dodgers	95	67	.586	—	54‍–‍27	41‍–‍40
Cincinnati Reds	92	69	.571	2½	49‍–‍31	43‍–‍38
San Francisco Giants	89	73	.549	6	50‍–‍31	39‍–‍42
San Diego Padres	84	78	.519	11	50‍–‍31	34‍–‍47
Houston Astros	74	88	.457	21	50‍–‍31	24‍–‍57
Atlanta Braves	69	93	.426	26	39‍–‍42	30‍–‍51

=== Record vs. opponents ===
1978 National League record Sources:
Team	ATL	CHC	CIN	HOU	LAD	MON	NYM	PHI	PIT	SD	SF	STL
Atlanta	—	5–7	6–12	8–10	5–13	5–7	6–6	8–4	2–10	8–10	11–7	5–7
Chicago	7–5	—	7–5	6–6	4–8	7–11	11–7	4–14	7–11	7–5	4–8	15–3
Cincinnati	12–6	5–7	—	11–7	9–9	8–4	7–5	7–5	4–7	9–9	12–6	8–4
Houston	10–8	6–6	7–11	—	7–11	6–6	7–5	6–6	4–8	8–10	6–12	7–5
Los Angeles	13–5	8–4	9–9	11–7	—	8–4	7–5	7–5	7–5	9–9	11–7	5–7
Montreal	7–5	11–7	4–8	6–6	4–8	—	8–10	9–9	7–11	6–6	5–7	9–9
New York	6–6	7–11	5–7	5–7	5–7	10–8	—	6–12	7–11	5–7	3–9	7–11
Philadelphia	4-8	14–4	5–7	6–6	5–7	9–9	12–6	—	11–7	8–4	6–6	10–8
Pittsburgh	10–2	11–7	7–4	8–4	5–7	11–7	11–7	7–11	—	5–7	4–8	9–9
San Diego	10–8	5–7	9–9	10–8	9–9	6–6	7–5	4–8	7–5	—	8–10	9–3
San Francisco	7–11	8–4	6–12	12–6	7–11	7–5	9–3	6–6	8–4	10–8	—	9–3
St. Louis	7–5	3–15	4–8	5–7	7–5	9–9	11–7	8–10	9–9	3–9	3–9	—

=== Opening Day starters ===
- Rob Andrews
- Jack Clark
- Darrell Evans
- Larry Herndon
- Marc Hill
- Johnnie LeMaster
- Willie McCovey
- John Montefusco
- Terry Whitfield

=== Notable transactions ===
- June 6, 1978: John Rabb was drafted by the Giants in the 11th round of the 1978 Major League Baseball draft.
- July 18, 1978: The Giants traded a player to be named later to the St. Louis Cardinals for John Tamargo. The Giants completed the deal by sending Rob Dressler to the Cardinals on July 24.

=== Roster ===
1978 San Francisco Giants
Roster
Pitchers: 33 Jim Barr; 14 Vida Blue; 34,42 Terry Cornutt; 40 John Curtis; 28 Ed Halicki; 39 Bob Knepper; 46 Gary Lavelle; 47 Lynn McGlothen; 38 Greg Minton; 17 Randy Moffitt; 26 John Montefusco; 25 Philip Nastu; 37 Ed Plank; 49 Charlie Williams	Catchers: 2 Marc Hill; 35,47 Dennis Littlejohn; 3 Mike Sadek; 30 John Tamargo; Infielders: 21 Rob Andrews; 41 Darrell Evans; 20 Vic Harris; 34 Tom Heintzelman; 15 Mike Ivie; 36 Skip James; 10 Johnnie LeMaster; 18 Bill Madlock; 44 Willie McCovey; 16 Roger Metzger	Outfielders: 22 Jack Clark; 9 Héctor Cruz; 36 Jim Dwyer; 31 Larry Herndon; 45 Terry Whitfield; Other batters: 35 Art Gardner	Manager: 6 Joe Altobelli; Coaches: 12 Jim Davenport; 8 Tom Haller; 23 Herm Starrette

== Player stats ==
= Indicates team leader

=== Batting ===
==== Starters by position ====
Note: Pos = Position; G = Games played; AB = At bats; H = Hits; Avg. = Batting average; HR = Home runs; RBI = Runs batted in

Pos	Player	G	AB	H	Avg.	HR	RBI
C	Marc Hill	117	358	87	.243	3	36
1B	Willie McCovey	108	351	80	.228	12	64
2B	Bill Madlock	122	447	138	.309	15	44
SS	Johnny LeMaster	101	272	64	.235	1	14
3B	Darrell Evans	159	547	133	.243	20	78
LF	Terry Whitfield	149	488	141	.289	10	32
CF	Larry Herndon	151	471	122	.259	1	72
RF	Jack Clark	156	592	181	.306	25	98

==== Other batters ====
Note: G = Games played; AB = At bats; H = Hits; Avg. = Batting average; HR = Home runs; RBI = Runs batted in

Player	G	AB	H	Avg.	HR	RBI
Mike Ivie	117	318	98	.308	11	55
Roger Metzger	75	235	61	.260	0	17
Héctor Cruz	79	197	44	.223	6	24
Rob Andrews	79	177	39	.220	1	11
Jim Dwyer	73	173	39	.225	5	22
Mike Sadek	40	109	26	.239	2	9
Vic Harris	53	100	15	.150	1	11
John Tamargo	36	92	22	.239	1	8
Tom Heintzelman	27	35	8	.229	2	6
Skip James	41	21	2	.095	0	3
Art Gardner	7	3	0	.000	0	0
Dennis Littlejohn	2	0	0	----	0	0

=== Pitching ===
==== Starting pitchers ====
Note: G = Games pitched; IP = Innings pitched; W = Wins; L = Losses; ERA = Earned run average; SO = Strikeouts

Player	G	IP	W	L	ERA	SO
Bob Knepper	36	260.0	17	11	2.63	147
Vida Blue	35	258.0	18	10	2.79	171
John Montefusco	36	238.2	11	9	3.81	177
Ed Halicki	29	199.0	9	10	2.85	105
Jim Barr	32	163.0	8	11	3.53	44

==== Other pitchers ====
Note: G = Games pitched; IP = Innings pitched; W = Wins; L = Losses; ERA = Earned run average; SO = Strikeouts

Player	G	IP	W	L	ERA	SO
Lynn McGlothen	5	12.2	0	0	4.97	9
Philip Nastu	3	8.0	0	1	5.63	5

==== Relief pitchers ====
Note: G = Games pitched; W = Wins; L = Losses; SV = Saves; ERA = Earned run average; SO = Strikeouts

Player	G	W	L	SV	ERA	SO
Gary Lavelle	67	13	10	14	3.32	63
Randy Moffitt	70	8	4	12	3.31	52
John Curtis	46	4	3	1	3.71	38
Charlie Williams	25	1	3	0	5.44	22
Greg Minton	11	0	1	0	8.04	6
Ed Plank	5	0	0	0	4.05	1
Terry Cornutt	1	0	0	0	0.00	0

== Awards and honors ==
All-Star Game

- Jack Clark
- Vida Blue

Sporting News

- National league Pitcher of the Year: Vida Blue

Major League Baseball

- National League Player of the Month: Jack Clark (May 1978)

== Farm system ==
Level	Team	League	Manager
AAA	Phoenix Giants	Pacific Coast League	Rocky Bridges
AA	Waterbury Giants	Eastern League	Andy Gilbert
A	Fresno Giants	California League	John VanOrnum
A	Cedar Rapids Giants	Midwest League	Jack Mull
Rookie	Great Falls Giants	Pioneer League	Ernie Rodriguez
