= 1978 Pittsburgh Pirates season =

1978 Pittsburgh Pirates
- League: National League
- Division: East
- Ballpark: Three Rivers Stadium
- City: Pittsburgh, Pennsylvania
- Record: 88–73 (.547)
- Divisional place: 2nd
- Owners: John W. Galbreath (majority shareholder); Thomas P. Johnson (minority shareholder)
- General managers: Harding "Pete" Peterson
- Managers: Chuck Tanner
- Television: KDKA-TV; Milo Hamilton, Lanny Frattare
- Radio: KDKA; Milo Hamilton, Lanny Frattare

The 1978 Pittsburgh Pirates season was the 97th season of the Pittsburgh Pirates franchise; the 92nd in the National League. The Pirates finished second in the National League East with a record of 88–73.

== Offseason ==
- December 8, 1977: Al Oliver and Nelson Norman were traded by the Pirates to the Texas Rangers as part of a four-team trade. Bert Blyleven was traded by the Rangers to the Pirates, and John Milner was traded by the New York Mets to the Pirates. Willie Montañez was traded by the Atlanta Braves to the Mets, and the Rangers traded Tom Grieve and a player to be named later to the Mets. The Rangers traded Adrian Devine, Tommy Boggs, and Eddie Miller to the Braves. The Mets traded Jon Matlack to the Rangers. The Rangers completed the deal by sending Ken Henderson to the Mets on March 15, 1978.
- March 18, 1978: Carl Morton was released by the Pirates.

== Regular season ==
=== Season standings ===
NL East
| Team | W | L | Pct. | GB | Home | Road |
|---|---|---|---|---|---|---|
| Philadelphia Phillies | 90 | 72 | .556 | — | 54‍–‍28 | 36‍–‍44 |
| Pittsburgh Pirates | 88 | 73 | .547 | 1½ | 55‍–‍26 | 33‍–‍47 |
| Chicago Cubs | 79 | 83 | .488 | 11 | 44‍–‍38 | 35‍–‍45 |
| Montreal Expos | 76 | 86 | .469 | 14 | 41‍–‍39 | 35‍–‍47 |
| St. Louis Cardinals | 69 | 93 | .426 | 21 | 37‍–‍44 | 32‍–‍49 |
| New York Mets | 66 | 96 | .407 | 24 | 33‍–‍47 | 33‍–‍49 |

=== Record vs. opponents ===
1978 National League record Sources:
| Team | ATL | CHC | CIN | HOU | LAD | MON | NYM | PHI | PIT | SD | SF | STL |
|---|---|---|---|---|---|---|---|---|---|---|---|---|
| Atlanta | — | 5–7 | 6–12 | 8–10 | 5–13 | 5–7 | 6–6 | 8–4 | 2–10 | 8–10 | 11–7 | 5–7 |
| Chicago | 7–5 | — | 7–5 | 6–6 | 4–8 | 7–11 | 11–7 | 4–14 | 7–11 | 7–5 | 4–8 | 15–3 |
| Cincinnati | 12–6 | 5–7 | — | 11–7 | 9–9 | 8–4 | 7–5 | 7–5 | 4–7 | 9–9 | 12–6 | 8–4 |
| Houston | 10–8 | 6–6 | 7–11 | — | 7–11 | 6–6 | 7–5 | 6–6 | 4–8 | 8–10 | 6–12 | 7–5 |
| Los Angeles | 13–5 | 8–4 | 9–9 | 11–7 | — | 8–4 | 7–5 | 7–5 | 7–5 | 9–9 | 11–7 | 5–7 |
| Montreal | 7–5 | 11–7 | 4–8 | 6–6 | 4–8 | — | 8–10 | 9–9 | 7–11 | 6–6 | 5–7 | 9–9 |
| New York | 6–6 | 7–11 | 5–7 | 5–7 | 5–7 | 10–8 | — | 6–12 | 7–11 | 5–7 | 3–9 | 7–11 |
| Philadelphia | 4-8 | 14–4 | 5–7 | 6–6 | 5–7 | 9–9 | 12–6 | — | 11–7 | 8–4 | 6–6 | 10–8 |
| Pittsburgh | 10–2 | 11–7 | 7–4 | 8–4 | 5–7 | 11–7 | 11–7 | 7–11 | — | 5–7 | 4–8 | 9–9 |
| San Diego | 10–8 | 5–7 | 9–9 | 10–8 | 9–9 | 6–6 | 7–5 | 4–8 | 7–5 | — | 8–10 | 9–3 |
| San Francisco | 7–11 | 8–4 | 6–12 | 12–6 | 7–11 | 7–5 | 9–3 | 6–6 | 8–4 | 10–8 | — | 9–3 |
| St. Louis | 7–5 | 3–15 | 4–8 | 5–7 | 7–5 | 9–9 | 11–7 | 8–10 | 9–9 | 3–9 | 3–9 | — |

=== Game log ===
1978 Game Log: 88–73 (Home: 55–26; Away: 33–47)
April: 10–9 (Home: 6–4; Away: 4–5)

| # | Date | Opponent | Score | Win | Loss | Save | Attendance | Record |
|---|---|---|---|---|---|---|---|---|
| 1 | April 7 | Cubs | 1–0 | **Candelaria** (1–0) | Reuschel | — | 39,028 | 1–0 |
| 2 | April 8 | Cubs | 4–3 (10) | **Bibby** (1–0) | Sutter | — | 9,387 | 2–0 |
| 3 | April 9 | Cubs | 3–4 | Moore | **Kison** (0–1) | Sutter | 11,632 | 2–1 |
| 4 | April 10 | @ Cardinals | 2–11 | Denny | **Rooker** (0–1) | — | 19,241 | 2–2 |
| 5 | April 12 | @ Cardinals | 1–5 | Forsch | **Candelaria** (1–1) | — | 12,294 | 2–3 |
| 6 | April 13 | @ Cardinals | 5–6 | Rasmussen | **Blyleven** (0–1) | — | 12,351 | 2–4 |
| 7 | April 14 | @ Cubs | 4–5 | Hernandez | **Bibby** (1–1) | — | 45,777 | 2–5 |
| 8 | April 15 | @ Cubs | 13–10 | **Rooker** (1–1) | Lamp | — | 20,684 | 3–5 |
| 9 | April 16 | @ Cubs | 1–5 | Reuschel | **Robinson** (0–1) | — | 20,921 | 3–6 |
| 10 | April 17 | Phillies | 2–6 | Lonborg | **Candelaria** (1–2) | — | 7,343 | 3–7 |
| 11 | April 22 | Cardinals | 8–7 | **Tekulve** (1–0) | Urrea | — | 5,173 | 4–7 |
| 12 | April 23 | Cardinals | 14–7 | **Kison** (1–1) | Forsch | — | | 5–7 |
| 13 | April 23 | Cardinals | 5–4 | **Bibby** (2–1) | Vuckovich | **Robinson** (1) | 10,008 | 6–7 |
| 14 | April 24 | @ Mets | 4–2 | **Tekulve** (2–0) | Cornejo | — | 9,495 | 7–7 |
| 15 | April 25 | @ Mets | 2–1 | **Robinson** (1–1) | Bruhert | — | 6,914 | 8–7 |
| 16 | April 26 | @ Mets | 1–0 (11) | **Blyleven** (1–1) | Myrick | — | 6,506 | 9–7 |
| 17 | April 28 | Giants | 4–5 | Montefusco | **Candelaria** (1–3) | Lavelle | 7,881 | 9–8 |
| 18 | April 29 | Giants | 6–2 | **Robinson** (2–1) | Barr | — | 7,976 | 10–8 |
| 19 | April 30 | Giants | 3–7 | Knepper | **Blyleven** (1–2) | — | 7,929 | 10–9 |

May: 12–16 (Home: 6–6; Away: 6–10)

| # | Date | Opponent | Score | Win | Loss | Save | Attendance | Record |
|---|---|---|---|---|---|---|---|---|
| 20 | May 1 | Padres | 7–4 | **Bibby** (3–1) | Fingers | — | 2,786 | 11–9 |
| 21 | May 2 | Padres | 1–2 | Owchinko | **Candelaria** (1–4) | — | 3,228 | 11–10 |
| 22 | May 3 | Padres | 5–7 | D'Acquisto | **Bibby** (3–2) | Fingers | 5,052 | 11–11 |
| 23 | May 5 | Dodgers | 2–7 | Hooton | **Blyleven** (1–3) | — | 7,580 | 11–12 |
| 24 | May 6 | Dodgers | 3–2 | **Candelaria** (2–4) | Sutton | **Jackson** (1) | 8,919 | 12–12 |
| 25 | May 7 | Dodgers | 6–4 | **Rooker** (2–1) | John | **Tekulve** (1) | 18,208 | 13–12 |
| 26 | May 9 | @ Giants | 2–3 | Curtis | **Tekulve** (2–1) | — | 10,459 | 13–13 |
| 27 | May 10 | @ Giants | 5–1 | **Blyleven** (2–3) | Barr | — | 4,766 | 14–13 |
| 28 | May 11 | @ Giants | 2–6 | Knepper | **Candelaria** (2–5) | — | 6,071 | 14–14 |
| 29 | May 12 | @ Padres | 4–6 | Lee | **Tekulve** (2–2) | Fingers | 20,240 | 14–15 |
| 30 | May 13 | @ Padres | 5–6 | Spillner | **Kison** (1–2) | Fingers | 32,648 | 14–16 |
| 31 | May 14 | @ Padres | 1–0 | **Robinson** (3–1) | Jones | — | 18,572 | 15–16 |
| 32 | May 15 | @ Dodgers | 6–7 | Hough | **Blyleven** (2–4) | — | 35,297 | 15–17 |
| 33 | May 16 | @ Dodgers | 2–3 | Sutton | **Candelaria** (2–6) | Forster | 32,243 | 15–18 |
| 34 | May 17 | @ Dodgers | 1–10 | John | **Rooker** (2–2) | — | 33,097 | 15–19 |
| 35 | May 19 | @ Expos | 5–3 | **Robinson** (4–1) | May | **Tekulve** (2) | 13,088 | 16–19 |
| 36 | May 20 | @ Expos | 6–0 | **Blyleven** (3–4) | Twitchell | — | 13,834 | 17–19 |
| 37 | May 21 | @ Expos | 7–0 | **Candelaria** (3–6) | Grimsley | **Tekulve** (3) | 20,016 | 18–19 |
| 38 | May 22 | @ Expos | 2–5 | Rogers | **Rooker** (2–3) | Knowles | 12,300 | 18–20 |
| 39 | May 23 | Mets | 3–7 | Espinosa | **Jackson** (0–1) | Lockwood | 2,869 | 18–21 |
| 40 | May 24 | Mets | 6–5 (10) | **Tekulve** (3–2) | Lockwood | — | 5,302 | 19–21 |
| 41 | May 25 | Mets | 2–3 (11) | Murray | **Tekulve** (3–3) | — | 5,766 | 19–22 |
| 42 | May 26 | Expos | 2–1 | **Candelaria** (4–6) | Rogers | **Tekulve** (4) | 8,816 | 20–22 |
| 43 | May 27 | Expos | 1–15 | May | **Rooker** (2–4) | — | 10,773 | 20–23 |
| 44 | May 28 | Expos | 5–2 | **Bibby** (4–2) | Dues | — | 26,564 | 21–23 |
| 45 | May 29 | @ Phillies | 3–4 (14) | Brusstar | **Hamilton** (0–1) | — | 34,353 | 21–24 |
| 46 | May 30 | @ Phillies | 1–6 | Carlton | **Blyleven** (3–5) | — | 26,123 | 21–25 |
| 47 | May 31 | @ Phillies | 2–1 | **Candelaria** (5–6) | Lerch | **Tekulve** (5) | 29,595 | 22–25 |

June: 13–13 (Home: 7–7; Away: 6–6)

| # | Date | Opponent | Score | Win | Loss | Save | Attendance | Record |
|---|---|---|---|---|---|---|---|---|
| 48 | June 2 | @ Reds | 2–3 | Tomlin | **Rooker** (2–5) | — | 40,495 | 22–26 |
| 49 | June 3 | @ Reds | 3–4 | Norman | **Robinson** (4–2) | Sarmiento | 50,152 | 22–27 |
| 50 | June 4 | @ Reds | 4–1 | **Blyleven** (4–5) | Moskau | **Jackson** (2) | 37,304 | 23–27 |
| 51 | June 5 | Braves | 4–8 | Easterly | **Tekulve** (3–4) | — | 5,248 | 23–28 |
| 52 | June 6 | Braves | 4–2 | **Bibby** (5–2) | Devine | **Tekulve** (6) | 4,914 | 24–28 |
| 53 | June 9 | Reds | 11–9 | **Jackson** (1–1) | Bair | **Candelaria** (1) | 21,710 | 25–28 |
| 54 | June 10 | Reds | 4–6 | Seaver | **Jackson** (1–2) | — | 34,009 | 25–29 |
| 55 | June 11 | Reds | 3–1 | **Jackson** (2–2) | Sarmiento | **Whitson** (1) | 24,972 | 26–29 |
| 56 | June 12 | @ Astros | 5–6 | Williams | **Whitson** (0–1) | Sambito | 9,886 | 26–30 |
| 57 | June 13 | @ Astros | 1–2 | Forsch | **Bibby** (5–3) | Sambito | 10,487 | 26–31 |
| 58 | June 14 | @ Astros | 6–4 | **Whitson** (1–1) | Richard | **Tekulve** (7) | 12,440 | 27–31 |
| 59 | June 16 | @ Braves | 9–4 | **Blyleven** (5–5) | Niekro | **Whitson** (2) | 18,572 | 28–31 |
| 60 | June 17 | @ Braves | 5–3 | **Candelaria** (6–6) | Mahler | **Jackson** (3) | 16,284 | 29–31 |
| 61 | June 18 | @ Braves | 7–8 | Hanna | **Bibby** (5–4) | Skok | 21,498 | 29–32 |
| 62 | June 19 | Cubs | 4–6 (10) | Sutter | **Jackson** (2–3) | Hernandez | 8,878 | 29–33 |
| 63 | June 20 | Cubs | 6–1 | **Blyleven** (6–5) | Holtzman | — | 10,912 | 30–33 |
| 64 | June 21 | Cubs | 2–1 | **Candelaria** (7–6) | Burris | — | 11,064 | 31–33 |
| 65 | June 23 | @ Mets | 2–3 (11) | Murray | **Whitson** (1–2) | — | 16,594 | 31–34 |
| 66 | June 24 | @ Mets | 7–4 (12) | **Tekulve** (4–4) | Siebert | **Hamilton** (1) | 17,810 | 32–34 |
| 67 | June 25 | @ Mets | 4–0 | **Blyleven** (7–5) | Espinosa | — | 16,748 | 33–34 |
| 68 | June 26 | Cardinals | 11–8 | **Whitson** (2–2) | Urrea | **Tekulve** (8) | 5,045 | 34–34 |
| 69 | June 27 | Cardinals | 0–2 | Vuckovich | **Candelaria** (7–7) | Schultz | | 34–35 |
| 70 | June 27 | Cardinals | 1–6 | Falcone | **Reuss** (0–1) | — | 9,229 | 34–36 |
| 71 | June 28 | Cardinals | 5–7 (11) | Thomas | **Tekulve** (4–5) | — | 7,742 | 34–37 |
| 72 | June 29 | Mets | 4–3 | **Jackson** (3–3) | Lockwood | **Whitson** (3) | 6,367 | 35–37 |
| 73 | June 30 | Mets | 5–6 | Murray | **Hamilton** (0–2) | — | 31,947 | 35–38 |

July: 13–14 (Home: 9–4; Away: 4–10)

| # | Date | Opponent | Score | Win | Loss | Save | Attendance | Record |
|---|---|---|---|---|---|---|---|---|
| 74 | July 1 | Mets | 1–0 | **Rooker** (3–5) | Lockwood | **Tekulve** (9) | 7,912 | 36–38 |
| 75 | July 3 | Expos | 0–2 | Dues | **Candelaria** (7–8) | Rogers | 7,480 | 36–39 |
| 76 | July 4 | Expos | 3–1 | **Blyleven** (8–5) | Schatzeder | **Tekulve** (10) | | 37–39 |
| 77 | July 4 | Expos | 4–3 | **Robinson** (5–2) | Twitchell | **Tekulve** (11) | 15,001 | 38–39 |
| 78 | July 6 | @ Cardinals | 2–3 | Denny | **Rooker** (3–6) | — | 14,832 | 38–40 |
| 79 | July 7 | @ Cardinals | 2–1 | **Candelaria** (8–8) | Vuckovich | **Tekulve** (12) | 13,813 | 39–40 |
| 80 | July 8 | @ Cardinals | 0–4 | Martinez | **Robinson** (5–3) | — | 20,524 | 39–41 |
| 81 | July 9 | @ Cardinals | 6–1 | **Blyleven** (9–5) | Forsch | **Tekulve** (13) | 22,101 | 40–41 |
| 82 | July 13 | Giants | 0–4 | Knepper | **Candelaria** (8–9) | — | 13,984 | 40–42 |
| 83 | July 14 | Giants | 5–2 | **Rooker** (4–6) | Montefusco | **Tekulve** (14) | 15,733 | 41–42 |
| 84 | July 15 | Giants | 5–6 (11) | Lavelle | **Whitson** (2–3) | — | 16,174 | 41–43 |
| 85 | July 16 | Padres | 3–2 (10) | **Whitson** (3–3) | Fingers | — | | 42–43 |
| 86 | July 16 | Padres | 10–6 | **Jackson** (4–3) | Kinney | **Tekulve** (15) | 16,303 | 43–43 |
| 87 | July 17 | Padres | 8–7 (10) | **Tekulve** (5–5) | Fingers | — | 7,045 | 44–43 |
| 88 | July 18 | Dodgers | 2–7 | Sutton | **Robinson** (5–4) | — | 15,125 | 44–44 |
| 89 | July 19 | Dodgers | 6–3 | **Rooker** (5–6) | Rau | **Tekulve** (16) | 15,527 | 45–44 |
| 90 | July 20 | Dodgers | 7–6 (10) | **Kison** (2–2) | Forster | — | 13,823 | 46–44 |
| 91 | July 21 | @ Giants | 3–0 | **Bibby** (6–4) | Knepper | — | 23,882 | 47–44 |
| 92 | July 22 | @ Giants | 2–3 (10) | Curtis | **Tekulve** (5–6) | — | 18,872 | 47–45 |
| 93 | July 23 | @ Giants | 1–3 | Barr | **Candelaria** (8–10) | — | 41,923 | 47–46 |
| 94 | July 25 | @ Padres | 1–2 | Owchinko | **Rooker** (5–7) | — | 17,522 | 47–47 |
| 95 | July 26 | @ Padres | 5–6 | Perry | **Kison** (2–3) | Fingers | 16,556 | 47–48 |
| 96 | July 27 | @ Padres | 3–6 | Shirley | **Whitson** (3–4) | Fingers | 14,076 | 47–49 |
| 97 | July 28 | @ Dodgers | 3–7 | John | **Candelaria** (8–11) | Forster | 43,600 | 47–50 |
| 98 | July 29 | @ Dodgers | 1–2 | Sutton | **Robinson** (5–5) | — | 46,139 | 47–51 |
| 99 | July 30 | @ Dodgers | 5–3 | **Rooker** (6–7) | Rau | **Tekulve** (17) | 48,587 | 48–51 |
| 100 | July 31 | @ Expos | 2–3 | Garman | **Blyleven** (9–6) | — | 22,152 | 48–52 |

August: 18–12 (Home: 9–4; Away: 9–8)

| # | Date | Opponent | Score | Win | Loss | Save | Attendance | Record |
|---|---|---|---|---|---|---|---|---|
| 101 | August 1 | @ Expos | 3–4 | Rogers | **Bibby** (6–5) | Knowles | 21,287 | 48–53 |
| 102 | August 2 | @ Expos | 3–0 | **Kison** (3–3) | Schatzeder | **Tekulve** (18) | 15,378 | 49–53 |
| 103 | August 4 | Phillies | 0–2 | Christenson | **Rooker** (6–8) | — | | 49–54 |
| 104 | August 4 | Phillies | 5–2 | **Robinson** (6–5) | Kaat | — | 30,865 | 50–54 |
| 105 | August 6 | Phillies | 2–3 | Ruthven | **Blyleven** (9–7) | — | | 50–55 |
| 106 | August 6 | Phillies | 0–5 | Carlton | **Bibby** (6–6) | — | 31,141 | 50–56 |
| 107 | August 7 | @ Cubs | 4–5 | Moore | **Reuss** (0–2) | Sutter | 18,615 | 50–57 |
| 108 | August 8 | @ Cubs | 9–5 | **Robinson** (7–5) | Reuschel | — | 26,037 | 51–57 |
| 109 | August 9 | @ Cubs | 4–5 | Roberts | **Whitson** (3–5) | — | 23,310 | 51–58 |
| 110 | August 10 | @ Phillies | 1–3 | Ruthven | **Blyleven** (9–8) | — | 34,672 | 51–59 |
| 111 | August 11 | @ Phillies | 4–15 | Carlton | **Kison** (3–4) | — | 35,101 | 51–60 |
| 112 | August 12 | @ Phillies | 1–10 | Lerch | **Bibby** (6–7) | — | 30,110 | 51–61 |
| 113 | August 13 | @ Phillies | 7–3 | **Robinson** (8–5) | Christenson | — | 38,119 | 52–61 |
| 114 | August 14 | Reds | 7–4 | **Rooker** (7–8) | Moskau | **Tekulve** (19) | 26,514 | 53–61 |
| 115 | August 15 | Reds | 3–4 (10) | Bair | **Whitson** (3–6) | — | 16,400 | 53–62 |
| 116 | August 16 | Reds | 13–2 | **Candelaria** (9–11) | Bonham | **Jackson** (4) | 15,490 | 54–62 |
| 117 | August 17 | Astros | 5–1 | **Robinson** (9–5) | Richard | — | | 55–62 |
| 118 | August 17 | Astros | 3–2 | **Kison** (4–4) | Lemongello | **Tekulve** (20) | 8,470 | 56–62 |
| 119 | August 18 | Astros | 6–3 | **Bibby** (7–7) | Ruhle | **Tekulve** (21) | 8,632 | 57–62 |
| 120 | August 19 | Astros | 4–2 | **Blyleven** (10–8) | Bannister | **Tekulve** (22) | 22,015 | 58–62 |
| 121 | August 20 | Astros | 7–6 | **Rooker** (8–8) | Dixon | **Tekulve** (23) | | 59–62 |
| 122 | August 20 | Astros | 3–1 | **Reuss** (1–2) | Niekro | — | 21,851 | 60–62 |
| 123 | August 22 | @ Braves | 3–1 | **Robinson** (10–5) | Mahler | **Tekulve** (24) | 9,348 | 61–62 |
| 124 | August 23 | @ Braves | 4–3 (12) | **Jackson** (5–3) | Campbell | — | 6,553 | 62–62 |
| 125 | August 24 | @ Braves | 5–1 | **Blyleven** (11–8) | Niekro | **Tekulve** (25) | 7,965 | 63–62 |
| 126 | August 25 | @ Astros | 5–7 | Niekro | **Rooker** (8–9) | Andujar | 11,641 | 63–63 |
| 127 | August 26 | @ Astros | 2–7 | Richard | **Kison** (4–5) | — | 9,985 | 63–64 |
| 128 | August 27 | @ Astros | 8–5 | **Jackson** (6–3) | Lemongello | **Tekulve** (26) | 10,947 | 64–64 |
| 129 | August 28 | @ Reds | 3–1 | **Candelaria** (10–11) | Norman | **Whitson** (4) | 23,612 | 65–64 |
| 130 | August 29 | @ Reds | 5–0 | **Blyleven** (12–8) | LaCoss | — | 24,967 | 66–64 |

September: 21–9 (Home: 17–1; Away: 4–8)

| # | Date | Opponent | Score | Win | Loss | Save | Attendance | Record |
|---|---|---|---|---|---|---|---|---|
| 131 | September 1 | Braves | 8–3 | **Robinson** (11–5) | Niekro | **Tekulve** (27) | | 67–64 |
| 132 | September 1 | Braves | 3–0 | **Kison** (5–5) | Mahler | **Tekulve** (28) | 14,306 | 68–64 |
| 133 | September 2 | Braves | 4–3 (12) | **Jackson** (7–3) | Camp | — | 9,580 | 69–64 |
| 134 | September 3 | Braves | 6–3 | **Tekulve** (6–6) | Garber | — | 8,594 | 70–64 |
| 135 | September 4 | Mets | 7–4 | **Whitson** (4–6) | Lockwood | **Jackson** (5) | | 71–64 |
| 136 | September 4 | Mets | 7–0 | **Bibby** (8–7) | Berenguer | — | 25,765 | 72–64 |
| 137 | September 5 | Mets | 8–0 | **Reuss** (2–2) | Koosman | — | 18,476 | 73–64 |
| 138 | September 6 | @ Cardinals | 4–1 | **Robinson** (12–5) | Denny | — | 7,945 | 74–64 |
| 139 | September 7 | @ Cardinals | 4–5 | Lopez | **Jackson** (7–4) | Littell | 7,805 | 74–65 |
| 140 | September 8 | @ Mets | 2–3 | Murray | **Blyleven** (12–9) | — | 4,749 | 74–66 |
| 141 | September 9 | @ Mets | 1–4 | Kobel | **Rooker** (8–10) | — | 8,881 | 74–67 |
| 142 | September 10 | @ Mets | 9–11 | Bernard | **Tekulve** (6–7) | Cornejo | 9,256 | 74–68 |
| 143 | September 11 | @ Phillies | 3–10 | Carlton | **Robinson** (12–6) | — | 33,198 | 74–69 |
| 144 | September 12 | @ Phillies | 5–1 | **Candelaria** (11–11) | Christenson | **Tekulve** (29) | 31,355 | 75–69 |
| 145 | September 13 | Cardinals | 7–1 | **Blyleven** (13–9) | Falcone | — | 6,398 | 76–69 |
| 146 | September 14 | Cardinals | 7–4 | **Rooker** (9–10) | Forsch | — | 5,294 | 77–69 |
| 147 | September 15 | Expos | 6–1 | **Kison** (6–5) | Fryman | — | 15,146 | 78–69 |
| 148 | September 16 | Expos | 12–5 | **Robinson** (13–6) | Grimsley | — | 8,079 | 79–69 |
| 149 | September 17 | Expos | 5–3 | **Blyleven** (14–9) | May | **Tekulve** (30) | 8,544 | 80–69 |
| 150 | September 19 | @ Cubs | 12–11 (11) | **Jones** (1–0) | Sutter | — | 6,137 | 81–69 |
| 151 | September 20 | @ Cubs | 1–5 | Krukow | **Rooker** (9–11) | — | 5,269 | 81–70 |
| 152 | September 21 | @ Cubs | 3–2 (14) | **Whitson** (5–6) | Sutter | **Bibby** (1) | 2,423 | 82–70 |
| 153 | September 23 | @ Expos | 2–3 | Grimsley | **Blyleven** (14–10) | — | 20,324 | 82–71 |
| 154 | September 24 | @ Expos | 0–4 | Sanderson | **Kison** (6–6) | — | 23,260 | 82–72 |
| 155 | September 25 | Cubs | 7–4 | **Candelaria** (12–11) | Krukow | — | 5,937 | 83–72 |
| 156 | September 26 | Cubs | 5–2 | **Robinson** (14–6) | Lamp | — | 6,515 | 84–72 |
| 157 | September 27 | Cubs | 8–3 | **Reuss** (3–2) | Burris | — | 7,467 | 85–72 |
| 158 | September 29 | Phillies | 5–4 | **Tekulve** (7–7) | Reed | — | | 86–72 |
| 159 | September 29 | Phillies | 2–1 | **Tekulve** (8–7) | Carlton | — | 45,134 | 87–72 |
| 160 | September 30 | Phillies | 8–10 | Lerch | **Jackson** (7–5) | Reed | 28,905 | 87–73 |

October: 1–0 (Home: 1–0; Away: 0–0)

| # | Date | Opponent | Score | Win | Loss | Save | Attendance | Record |
|---|---|---|---|---|---|---|---|---|
| 161 | October 1 | Phillies | 5–3 | **Jones** (2–0) | Saucier | **Tekulve** (31) | 30,224 | 88–73 |

Legend: = Win = Loss
Bold = Pirates team member

=== Notable transactions ===
- April 4, 1978: Miguel Diloné, Elías Sosa and a player to be named later were traded by the Pirates to the Oakland Athletics for Manny Sanguillén. The Pirates completed the deal by sending Mike Edwards to the Athletics on April 7.
- June 1, 1978: Jim Fregosi was released by the Pirates.
- June 6, 1978: Vance Law was drafted by the Pirates in the 39th round of the 1978 amateur draft.
- September 22, 1978: Cito Gaston was purchased by the Pirates from the Atlanta Braves.

== Roster ==
1978 Pittsburgh Pirates
Roster
| Pitchers: 26 Jim Bibby; 22 Bert Blyleven; 45 John Candelaria; 48 Clay Carroll; 30 Dave Hamilton; 23 Grant Jackson; 36 Odell Jones; 25 Bruce Kison; 16,24 Will McEnaney; 41 Jerry Reuss; 43 Don Robinson; 19 Jim Rooker; 27 Kent Tekulve; 31 Ed Whitson | Catchers: 5 Duffy Dyer; 16 Steve Nicosia; 14 Ed Ott; Infielders: 4 Dale Berra; 15 Doe Boyland; 29 Jim Fregosi; 3 Phil Garner; 13 Fernando González; 29 Ken Macha; 11 Mario Mendoza; 35 Manny Sanguillén; 8 Willie Stargell; 6 Rennie Stennett; 10 Frank Taveras | Outfielders: 46 Steve Brye; 44 Cito Gaston; 37 Alberto Lois; 34 John Milner; 18 Omar Moreno; 39 Dave Parker; 28 Bill Robinson; Other batters: 12 Matt Alexander; 49 Dave May | Manager: 7 Chuck Tanner; Coaches: 32 Joe Lonnett (Third Base); 42 Al Monchak (Hitting); 2 José Pagán (First Base); 51 Larry Sherry (Pitching) |

== Player stats ==
=== Batting ===
==== Starters by position ====
Note: Pos = Position; G = Games played; AB = At bats; H = Hits; Avg. = Batting average; HR = Home runs; RBI = Runs batted in

| Pos | Player | G | AB | H | Avg. | HR | RBI |
|---|---|---|---|---|---|---|---|
| C | Ed Ott | 112 | 379 | 102 | .269 | 9 | 38 |
| 1B | Willie Stargell | 122 | 390 | 115 | .295 | 28 | 97 |
| 2B | Rennie Stennett | 106 | 333 | 81 | .243 | 3 | 35 |
| SS | Frank Taveras | 157 | 654 | 182 | .278 | 0 | 38 |
| 3B | Phil Garner | 154 | 528 | 138 | .261 | 10 | 66 |
| LF | Bill Robinson | 136 | 499 | 123 | .246 | 14 | 80 |
| CF | Omar Moreno | 155 | 515 | 121 | .235 | 2 | 33 |
| RF | Dave Parker | 148 | 581 | 194 | .334 | 30 | 117 |

==== Other batters ====
Note: G = Games played; AB = At bats; H = Hits; Avg. = Batting average; HR = Home runs; RBI = Runs batted in

| Player | G | AB | H | Avg. | HR | RBI |
|---|---|---|---|---|---|---|
| John Milner | 108 | 295 | 80 | .271 | 6 | 38 |
| Manny Sanguillén | 85 | 220 | 58 | .264 | 3 | 16 |
| Duffy Dyer | 58 | 175 | 37 | .211 | 0 | 13 |
| Dale Berra | 56 | 135 | 28 | .207 | 6 | 14 |
| Steve Brye | 66 | 115 | 27 | .235 | 1 | 9 |
| Mario Mendoza | 57 | 55 | 12 | .218 | 1 | 3 |
| Ken Macha | 29 | 52 | 11 | .212 | 0 | 5 |
| Fernando González | 9 | 21 | 4 | .190 | 0 | 0 |
| Jim Fregosi | 20 | 20 | 4 | .200 | 0 | 1 |
| Doe Boyland | 6 | 8 | 2 | .250 | 0 | 1 |
| Steve Nicosia | 3 | 5 | 0 | .000 | 0 | 1 |
| Dave May | 5 | 4 | 0 | .000 | 0 | 0 |
| Alberto Lois | 3 | 4 | 1 | .250 | 0 | 0 |
| Cito Gaston | 2 | 2 | 1 | .500 | 0 | 0 |
| Matt Alexander | 7 | 0 | 0 | ---- | 0 | 0 |

=== Pitching ===
| = Indicates league leader |

==== Starting pitchers ====
Note: G = Games pitched; IP = Innings pitched; W = Wins; L = Losses; ERA = Earned run average; SO = Strikeouts

| Player | G | IP | W | L | ERA | SO |
|---|---|---|---|---|---|---|
| Bert Blyleven | 34 | 243.2 | 14 | 10 | 3.03 | 182 |
| Don Robinson | 35 | 228.1 | 14 | 6 | 3.47 | 135 |
| John Candelaria | 30 | 189.0 | 12 | 11 | 3.24 | 94 |
| Jim Rooker | 28 | 163.1 | 9 | 11 | 4.24 | 76 |

==== Other pitchers ====
Note: G = Games pitched; IP = Innings pitched; W = Wins; L = Losses; ERA = Earned run average; SO = Strikeouts

| Player | G | IP | W | L | ERA | SO |
|---|---|---|---|---|---|---|
| Jim Bibby | 34 | 107.0 | 8 | 7 | 3.53 | 72 |
| Bruce Kison | 28 | 96.0 | 6 | 6 | 3.19 | 62 |
| Jerry Reuss | 23 | 82.2 | 3 | 2 | 4.90 | 42 |
| Odell Jones | 3 | 9.0 | 2 | 0 | 2.00 | 10 |

==== Relief pitchers ====
Note: G = Games pitched; W = Wins; L = Losses; SV = Saves; ERA = Earned run average; SO = Strikeouts

| Player | G | W | L | SV | ERA | SO |
|---|---|---|---|---|---|---|
| Kent Tekulve | 91 | 8 | 7 | 31 | 2.33 | 77 |
| Grant Jackson | 60 | 7 | 5 | 5 | 3.26 | 45 |
| Ed Whitson | 43 | 5 | 6 | 4 | 3.28 | 64 |
| Dave Hamilton | 16 | 0 | 2 | 1 | 3.42 | 15 |
| Will McEnaney | 6 | 0 | 0 | 0 | 10.38 | 6 |
| Clay Carroll | 2 | 0 | 0 | 0 | 2.25 | 0 |

== Awards and honors ==
- Willie Stargell, Hutch Award

=== All-Stars ===
1978 Major League Baseball All-Star Game

- Willie Stargell, reserve

== Farm system ==
| Level | Team | League | Manager |
|---|---|---|---|
| AAA | Columbus Clippers | International League | Johnny Lipon |
| AA | Shreveport Captains | Texas League | Steve Demeter |
| A | Salem Pirates | Carolina League | Jim Mahoney |
| A | Charleston Patriots | Western Carolinas League | Bill Scripture |
| Rookie | GCL Pirates | Gulf Coast League | Woody Huyke |
