= 1978 Cincinnati Reds season =

1978 Cincinnati Reds
- League: National League
- Division: West
- Ballpark: Riverfront Stadium
- City: Cincinnati
- Record: 92–69 (.571)
- Divisional place: 2nd
- Owners: Louis Nippert
- General managers: Bob Howsam, Dick Wagner
- Managers: Sparky Anderson
- Television: WLWT (Ken Coleman, Bill Brown)
- Radio: WLW (Marty Brennaman, Joe Nuxhall)

The 1978 Cincinnati Reds season was the 109th season for the franchise in Major League Baseball, and their 9th season at Riverfront Stadium. The Reds finished in second place in the National League West with a record of 92-69, 2½ games behind the Los Angeles Dodgers. The Reds were managed by Sparky Anderson and played their home games at Riverfront Stadium. Following the season, Anderson was replaced as manager by John McNamara, and Pete Rose left to sign with the Philadelphia Phillies for the 1979 season.

== Offseason ==
- October 31, 1977: Woodie Fryman and Bill Caudill were traded by the Reds to the Chicago Cubs for Bill Bonham.
- October 31, 1977: Joe Henderson was purchased from the Reds by the Toronto Blue Jays.
- December 9, 1977: Dave Collins was acquired by the Reds from the Seattle Mariners for Shane Rawley.
- February 25, 1978: Dave Revering and cash were traded by the Reds to the Oakland Athletics for Doug Bair.

== Spring training ==
In honor of Saint Patrick's Day, Reds general manager Dick Wagner had green versions of the Reds' uniforms made. The Reds hosted the New York Yankees at Al Lopez Field on March 17, 1978. This was the first time a major league team wore green trimmed uniforms on March 17, a practice adopted in subsequent years by multiple major league teams.

== Regular season ==
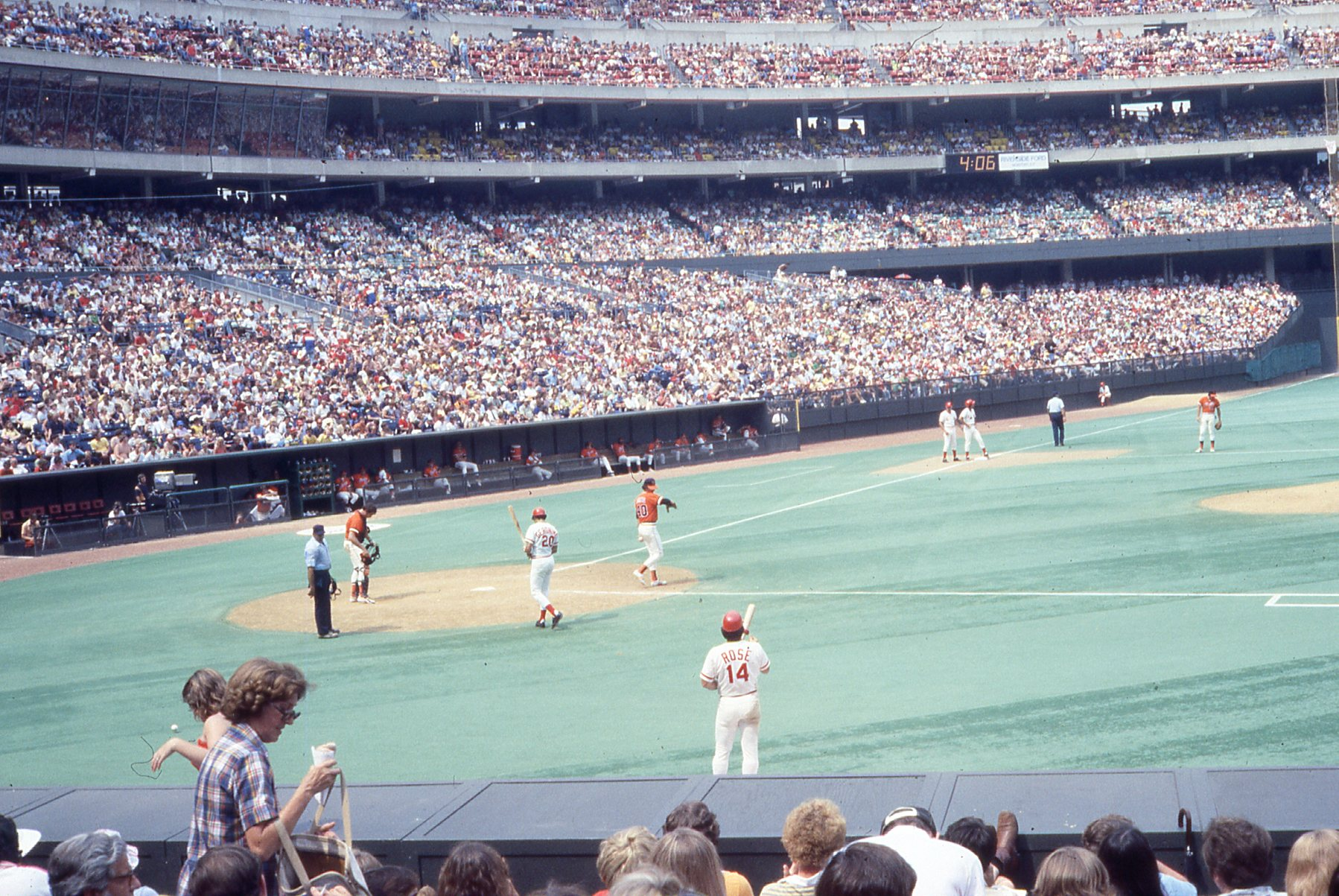
Reds vs. Giants at Riverfront Stadium, 1978. This was the 25th game of Pete Rose's 44-game hitting streak.

During the season, Pete Rose tied the National League record with a 44-game hitting streak held by Willie Keeler. The streak began on June 14, and came to an end on August 1.

On June 16, 1978 at Riverfront Stadium, Tom Seaver recorded a 4-0 no-hitter against the St. Louis Cardinals. It was the only no-hitter of his professional career.

=== Season standings ===
NL West
Team	W	L	Pct.	GB	Home	Road
Los Angeles Dodgers	95	67	.586	—	54‍–‍27	41‍–‍40
Cincinnati Reds	92	69	.571	2½	49‍–‍31	43‍–‍38
San Francisco Giants	89	73	.549	6	50‍–‍31	39‍–‍42
San Diego Padres	84	78	.519	11	50‍–‍31	34‍–‍47
Houston Astros	74	88	.457	21	50‍–‍31	24‍–‍57
Atlanta Braves	69	93	.426	26	39‍–‍42	30‍–‍51

=== Record vs. opponents ===
1978 National League record Sources:
Team	ATL	CHC	CIN	HOU	LAD	MON	NYM	PHI	PIT	SD	SF	STL
Atlanta	—	5–7	6–12	8–10	5–13	5–7	6–6	8–4	2–10	8–10	11–7	5–7
Chicago	7–5	—	7–5	6–6	4–8	7–11	11–7	4–14	7–11	7–5	4–8	15–3
Cincinnati	12–6	5–7	—	11–7	9–9	8–4	7–5	7–5	4–7	9–9	12–6	8–4
Houston	10–8	6–6	7–11	—	7–11	6–6	7–5	6–6	4–8	8–10	6–12	7–5
Los Angeles	13–5	8–4	9–9	11–7	—	8–4	7–5	7–5	7–5	9–9	11–7	5–7
Montreal	7–5	11–7	4–8	6–6	4–8	—	8–10	9–9	7–11	6–6	5–7	9–9
New York	6–6	7–11	5–7	5–7	5–7	10–8	—	6–12	7–11	5–7	3–9	7–11
Philadelphia	4-8	14–4	5–7	6–6	5–7	9–9	12–6	—	11–7	8–4	6–6	10–8
Pittsburgh	10–2	11–7	7–4	8–4	5–7	11–7	11–7	7–11	—	5–7	4–8	9–9
San Diego	10–8	5–7	9–9	10–8	9–9	6–6	7–5	4–8	7–5	—	8–10	9–3
San Francisco	7–11	8–4	6–12	12–6	7–11	7–5	9–3	6–6	8–4	10–8	—	9–3
St. Louis	7–5	3–15	4–8	5–7	7–5	9–9	11–7	8–10	9–9	3–9	3–9	—

=== Notable transactions ===
- June 6, 1978: 1978 Major League Baseball draft
  - Skeeter Barnes was drafted by the Reds in the 16th round. Player signed June 8, 1978.
  - Otis Nixon was drafted by the Reds in the 21st round, but did not sign.
- May 19, 1978: Dale Murray was traded by the Reds to the New York Mets for Ken Henderson.

=== Pete Rose hitting streak ===
On May 5, 1978, Rose became the 13th and youngest player in major league history to collect his 3,000th career hit, with a single off Expos pitcher Steve Rogers. Three days later, due to an illness and back spasms, Rose was forced to snap a 678 consecutive games played streak, which was the longest active streak in the majors at the time.

On June 14 in Cincinnati, Rose singled in the first inning off Cubs pitcher Dave Roberts; Rose would proceed to get a hit in every game he played until August 1, making a run at Joe DiMaggio's record 56-game hitting streak, which had stood virtually unchallenged for 37 years. The streak started quietly, but by the time it had reached 30 games, the media took notice and a pool of reporters accompanied Rose and the Reds to every game. On July 19 against the Phillies, Rose was hitless going into the ninth with his team trailing. He ended up walking and the streak appeared over. But the Reds managed to bat through their entire lineup, giving Rose another chance. Facing Ron Reed, Rose laid down a perfect bunt single to extend the streak to 32 games.

He eventually tied Willie Keeler's single season National League record at 44 games; but on August 1, the streak came to an end as Gene Garber of the Braves struck out Rose in the ninth inning. The competitive Rose was sour after the game, blasting Garber and the Braves for treating the situation "like it was the ninth inning of the 7th game of the World Series" and adding that "Phil Niekro would have given me a fastball to hit."

Game	Date	Pitcher	Team	Singles	Doubles
1	06-14-1978	Dave Roberts	Chicago Cubs	2	0
2	06-16-1978	John Denny	St. Louis Cardinals	2	1
3	06-17-1978	Pete Vukovich	St. Louis Cardinals	2	0
4	06-18-1978	Silvio Martinez	St. Louis Cardinals	1	0
5	06-20-1978	John Montefusco	San Francisco Giants	2	1
6	06-21-1978	Ed Halicki	San Francisco Giants	1	0
7	06-22-1978	Bob Knepper	San Francisco Giants	1	0
8	06-23-1978	Burt Hooton	Los Angeles Dodgers	1	0
9	06-24-1978	Bob Welch	Los Angeles Dodgers	1	0
10	06-25-1978	Tommy John	Los Angeles Dodgers	2	0
11	06-26-1978	Mark Lemongello	Houston Astros	1	0
12	06-27-1978	Joe Niekro	Houston Astros	1	0
13	06-28-1978	Tom Dixon	Houston Astros	1	0
14	06-29-1978	Floyd Bannister	Houston Astros	1	1
15	06-30-1978	Lance Rautzhan	Los Angeles Dodgers	1	0
16	06-30-1978	Bob Welch	Los Angeles Dodgers	3	0
17	07-01-1978	Rick Rhoden	Los Angeles Dodgers	1	1
18	07-02-1978	Doug Rau	Los Angeles Dodgers	1	1
19	07-03-1978	Floyd Bannister	Houston Astros	3	1
20	07-04-1978	J. R. Richard	Houston Astros	1	0
21	07-05-1978	Joe Niekro	Houston Astros	1	0
22	07-07-1978	Vida Blue	San Francisco Giants	3	0
23	07-07-1978	Jim Barr	San Francisco Giants	1	0
24	07-08-1978	John Montefusco	San Francisco Giants	1	0
25	07-09-1978	Ed Halicki	San Francisco Giants	3	0
26	07-13-1978	Jerry Koosman	New York Mets	2	1
27	07-14-1978	Pat Zachry	New York Mets	2	0
28	07-15-1978	Craig Swan	New York Mets	1	0
29	07-16-1978	Paul Siebert	New York Mets	1	1
30	07-17-1978	Stan Bahnsen	Montreal Expos	1	0
31	07-18-1978	Hal Dues	Montreal Expos	2	1
32	07-19-1978	Ron Reed	Philadelphia Phillies	1	0
33	07-20-1978	Jim Kaat	Philadelphia Phillies	1	0
34	07-21-1978	Ross Grimsley	Montreal Expos	1	0
35	07-22-1978	Dan Schatzeder	Montreal Expos	1	0
36	07-22-1978	Steve Rogers	Montreal Expos	2	1
37	07-24-1978	Pat Zachry	New York Mets	1	0
38	07-25-1978	Craig Swan	New York Mets	3	1
39	07-26-1978	Nino Espinosa	New York Mets	1	1
40	07-28-1978	Randy Lerch	Philadelphia Phillies	1	1
41	07-28-1978	Steve Carlton	Philadelphia Phillies	1	0
42	07-29-1978	Jim Lonborg	Philadelphia Phillies	3	0
43	07-30-1978	Larry Christenson	Philadelphia Phillies	2	0
44	07-31-1978	Phil Niekro	Atlanta Braves	1	0

=== Roster ===
1978 Cincinnati Reds
Roster
Pitchers: 40 Doug Bair; 42 Bill Bonham; 34 Pedro Borbón; 44 Doug Capilla; 50 Dan Dumoulin; 47 Tom Hume; 51 Mike LaCoss; 31 Paul Moskau; 37 Dale Murray; 32 Fred Norman; 45 Manny Sarmiento; 41 Tom Seaver; 36 Mario Soto; 43 Dave Tomlin	Catchers: 5 Johnny Bench; 9 Vic Correll; 7 Don Werner; Infielders: 23 Rick Auerbach; 13 Dave Concepción; 58 Arturo DeFreites; 22 Dan Driessen; 17 Mike Grace; 26 Junior Kennedy; 25 Ray Knight; 8 Joe Morgan; 16 Ron Oester; 14 Pete Rose	Outfielders: 29 Dave Collins; 15 George Foster; 20 César Gerónimo; 30 Ken Griffey; 19 Ken Henderson; 21 Mike Lum; 28 Champ Summers; Other batters: 56 Harry Spilman	Manager: 10 Sparky Anderson; Coaches: 6 Alex Grammas; 18 Ted Kluszewski; 2 Russ Nixon; 11 Ron Plaza; 3 George Scherger; 4 Larry Shepard

== Player stats ==
= Indicates team leader

=== Batting ===
==== Starters by position ====
Note: Pos = Position; G = Games played; AB = At bats; H = Hits; Avg. = Batting average; HR = Home runs; RBI = Runs batted in

Pos	Player	G	AB	H	Avg.	HR	RBI
C	Johnny Bench	120	393	102	.260	23	73
1B	Dan Driessen	153	524	131	.250	16	70
2B	Joe Morgan	132	441	104	.236	13	75
3B	Pete Rose	159	655	198	.302	7	52
SS	Dave Concepción	153	565	170	.301	6	67
LF	George Foster	158	604	170	.281	40	120
CF	César Gerónimo	122	296	67	.226	5	27
RF	Ken Griffey	158	614	177	.288	10	63

==== Other batters ====
Note: G = Games played; AB = At bats; H = Hits; Avg. = Batting average; HR = Home runs; RBI = Runs batted in

Player	G	AB	H	Avg.	HR	RBI
Junior Kennedy	89	157	40	.255	0	11
Mike Lum	86	146	39	.267	6	23
Ken Henderson	64	144	24	.167	3	19
Don Werner	50	113	17	.150	0	11
Vic Correll	52	105	25	.238	1	6
Dave Collins	102	102	22	.216	0	7
Ray Knight	83	65	13	.200	1	4
Rick Auerbach	63	55	18	.327	2	5
Champ Summers	13	35	9	.257	1	3
Arturo DeFreites	9	19	4	.211	1	2
Ron Oester	6	8	3	.375	0	1
Harry Spilman	4	4	1	.250	0	0
Mike Grace	5	3	0	.000	0	0

=== Pitching ===
==== Starting pitchers ====
Note: G = Games pitched; IP = Innings pitched; W = Wins; L = Losses; ERA = Earned run average; SO = Strikeouts

Player	G	IP	W	L	ERA	SO
Tom Seaver	36	259.2	16	14	2.88	226
Fred Norman	31	177.1	11	9	3.70	111
Paul Moskau	26	145.0	6	4	3.97	88
Bill Bonham	23	140.1	11	5	3.53	83
Mike LaCoss	16	96.0	4	8	4.50	31

==== Other pitchers ====
Note: G = Games pitched; IP = Innings pitched; W = Wins; L = Losses; ERA = Earned run average; SO = Strikeouts

Player	G	IP	W	L	ERA	SO
Tom Hume	42	174.0	8	11	4.14	90
Mario Soto	5	18.0	1	0	2.50	13
Doug Capilla	6	11.0	0	1	9.82	9

==== Relief pitchers ====
Note: G = Games pitched; W = Wins; L = Losses; SV = Saves; ERA = Earned run average; SO = Strikeouts

Player	G	W	L	SV	ERA	SO
Doug Bair	70	7	6	28	1.97	91
Manny Sarmiento	63	9	7	5	4.38	72
Pedro Borbón	62	8	2	4	4.98	35
Dave Tomlin	57	9	1	4	5.78	32
Dale Murray	15	1	1	2	4.13	25
Dan Dumoulin	3	1	0	0	1.80	2

== Farm system ==
Level	Team	League	Manager
AAA	Indianapolis Indians	American Association	Roy Majtyka
AA	Nashville Sounds	Southern League	Chuck Goggin
A	Tampa Tarpons	Florida State League	Mike Compton
A	Shelby Reds	Western Carolinas League	Jim Lett
A-Short Season	Eugene Emeralds	Northwest League	Greg Riddoch
Rookie	Billings Mustangs	Pioneer League	Jim Hoff

LEAGUE CHAMPIONS: Billings
