= 1978 Major League Baseball draft =

Major League Baseball draft

Overview
- First selection: Bob Horner; Atlanta Braves
- First round selections: 26
- Hall of Famers: 2: SS Cal Ripken Jr.; 2B Ryne Sandberg

The 1978 Major League Baseball draft was held June 6–8, 1978, consisting of 48 rounds, during which a total of 779 players were selected by 26 Major League Baseball (MLB) organizations. The first overall selection was Bob Horner, drafted by the Atlanta Braves.

Four of the selected players made their professional debuts in MLB without first playing in Minor League Baseball: third baseman Horner from Arizona State University, Oakland High School pitchers Tim Conroy and Mike Morgan, and catcher Brian Milner from Southwest High School in Fort Worth, Texas.

In addition to Horner, the Braves also selected future major-leaguer players Matt Sinatro (2nd round), Steve Bedrosian (3rd round), Rick Behenna (4th round), Jose Alvarez (8th round) and Gerald Perry (11th round).

Others notable players drafted included Lloyd Moseby and Dave Stieb (Toronto), Mike Marshall and Steve Sax (Los Angeles), Cal Ripken Jr. and Mike Boddicker (Baltimore), Kirk Gibson (Detroit), Kent Hrbek (Minnesota) and Hubie Brooks (New York Mets).

== First round selections ==
The following are the first round picks in the 1978 Major League Baseball draft.

= All-Star	= Baseball Hall of Fame

Pick	Player	Team	Position	School
1	Bob Horner	Atlanta Braves	3B	Arizona State
2	Lloyd Moseby	Toronto Blue Jays	1B	Oakland High School (Oakland, California)
3	Hubie Brooks	New York Mets	SS	Arizona State
4	Mike Morgan	Oakland Athletics	RHP	Valley High School (Las Vegas, Nevada)
5	Andy Hawkins	San Diego Padres	RHP	Midway High School (Hewitt, Texas)
6	Tito Nanni	Seattle Mariners	OF	Chestnut Hill Academy High School (Philadelphia, Pennsylvania)
7	Bob Cummings	San Francisco Giants	C	Brother Rice High School (Chicago, Illinois)
8	Nick Hernandez	Milwaukee Brewers	C	Hialeah High School (Hialeah, Florida)
9	Glenn Franklin	Montreal Expos	SS	Chipola Junior College
10	Phil Lansford	Cleveland Indians	SS	Wilcox High School (Santa Clara, California)
11	Rod Boxberger	Houston Astros	RHP	University of Southern California
12	Kirk Gibson	Detroit Tigers	OF	Michigan State University
13	Bill Hayes	Chicago Cubs	C	Indiana State University
14	Tom Brunansky	California Angels	OF	West Covina High School (West Covina, California)
15	Robert Hicks	St. Louis Cardinals	1B	Tate High School (Pensacola, Florida)
16	Lenny Faedo	Minnesota Twins	SS	Jefferson High School (Tampa, Florida)
17	Nick Esasky	Cincinnati Reds	SS	Carol City High School (Carol City, Florida)
18	Rex Hudler	New York Yankees (Note: Pick from Chicago White Sox as compensation for signing of free agent Ron Blomberg)	SS	Bullard High School (Fresno, California)
19	Brad Garnett	Pittsburgh Pirates	1B	DeSoto High School (DeSoto, Texas)
20	Tim Conroy	Oakland Athletics (Note: Pick from Texas Rangers as compensation for signing of free agent Mike Jorgensen)	LHP	Gateway High School (Monroeville, Pennsylvania)
21	Gerry Aubin	Pittsburgh Pirates (Note: Pick from Los Angeles Dodgers as compensation for signing of free agent Terry Forster)	OF	Dougherty Comprehensive High School (Albany, Georgia)
22	Robert Boyce	Baltimore Orioles	3B	Deer Park High School (Cincinnati, Ohio)
23	Rip Rollins	Philadelphia Phillies	1B/RHP	Allegheny High School (Sparta, North Carolina)
24	Matt Winters	New York Yankees (Note: Pick from Boston Red Sox as compensation for signing of free agent Mike Torrez)	OF	Williamsville High School (Williamsville, New York)
25	Buddy Biancalana	Kansas City Royals	SS	Redwood High School (Greenbrae, California)
26	Brian Ryder	New York Yankees	RHP	Shrewsbury High School (Shrewsbury, Massachusetts)

== Other notable players ==
= All-Star	= Baseball Hall of Famer

Round	Pick	Player	Team	Position
2	37	Danny Heep	Houston Astros	OF
2	39	Mel Hall	Chicago Cubs	OF
2	48	Cal Ripken Jr.	Baltimore Orioles	3B
2	52	Steve Balboni	New York Yankees	1B
3	53	Steve Bedrosian	Atlanta Braves	RHP
3	70	Britt Burns	Chicago White Sox	LHP
3	74	Bobby Bonner	Baltimore Orioles	SS
4	85	Rob Deer	San Francisco Giants	OF
4	92	Mike Witt	California Angels	RHP
5	106	Dave Stieb	Toronto Blue Jays	OF
6	151	Mike Marshall	Los Angeles Dodgers	1B
6	152	Mike Boddicker	Baltimore Orioles	RHP
8	196	Tim Wallach*	California Angels	1B
9	229	Steve Sax	Los Angeles Dodgers	SS
15	377	Mark Langston*	Chicago Cubs	LHP
15	381	Gary Redus	Cincinnati Reds	SS
16	415	Frank Viola*	Kansas City Royals	LHP
17	432	Kent Hrbek	Minnesota Twins	1B
18	447	Eric Show	San Diego Padres	RHP
18	460	John Stuper	Pittsburgh Pirates	RHP
19	475	Kevin McReynolds*	Milwaukee Brewers	OF
20	511	Ryne Sandberg	Philadelphia Phillies	IF
21	531	Dave Dravecky	Pittsburgh Pirates	LHP
23	577	Howard Johnson*	New York Yankees	RHP
24	594	Rick Leach	Philadelphia Phillies	1B
39	758	Vance Law	Pittsburgh Pirates	SS
47	778	Ron Reeves	Cleveland Indians	RHP

* Did not sign

Preceded by Harold Baines	1st Overall Picks; Bob Horner	Succeeded by Al Chambers
