= Reggie Baldwin =

American baseball player (born 1954)

- Catcher
- Born: August 19, 1954 (age 71); River Rouge, Michigan
- Batted: Right Threw: Right

MLB debut
- May 25, 1978, for the Houston Astros

Last MLB appearance
- September 24, 1979, for the Houston Astros

MLB statistics
- Batting average: .241
- Home runs: 1
- Runs batted in: 12
- Stats at Baseball Reference

Teams
- Houston Astros (1978–1979)

Reginald Conrad Baldwin (born August 19, 1954) is an American former right-handed Major League Baseball catcher who played in 1978 and 1979 for the Houston Astros, although his minor league career spanned from 1976 to 1980. He was 6 ft 1 in (1.85 m) tall and he weighed 195 pounds.

Prior to playing professionally, Baldwin attended Grambling State University. He was drafted by the Astros in the third round of the 1976 amateur draft. He began his professional career that year with the rookie-league Covington Astros, hitting .286 with ten home runs in 245 at-bats.

In 1977, he played for the Columbus Astros and Charleston Charlies, hitting a combined .284 in 104 at-bats. His on-base percentage was a mere .309, because he walked only six times in 359 at-bats. He spent only 36 games in the minors in 1978, all for the Columbus Astros. With them, he hit .323 in 133 at-bats. That earned him a call-up to the major leagues, and on May 25, he made his debut. In his first game - which was against the San Francisco Giants - he replaced Astros starting catcher Joe Ferguson in the bottom of the seventh inning. In his first and only at-bat of the game, he flied out against pitcher Ed Halicki. Overall, he hit .254 with one home run and 11 RBI in 38 games in his first season. In 67 at-bats, he walked only three times - but he struck out only three times as well.

Baldwin spent most of 1979 in the minors, splitting his minor league season between the Columbus Astros and Charleston Charlies. In 71 minor league games, he hit .278 with seven home runs, walking only six times in 255 at-bats. He also spent 14 games in the big leagues that year, hitting only .200 in 20 at-bats. On September 24, he played his final game.

Although his major league career was done after the 1979 season, his minor league career was not. After being traded to the New York Mets on February 20, 1980, for Keith Bodie, he played for the Tidewater Tides in their farm system that season. He hit .273 in 96 games. 1980 was his final professional season.

Overall, Baldwin hit .241 with one home run and 12 RBI in 52 big league games. In a five-year minor league career, he hit .285 with 29 home runs in 370 games.
