= Mike Vail =

American baseball player (born 1951)

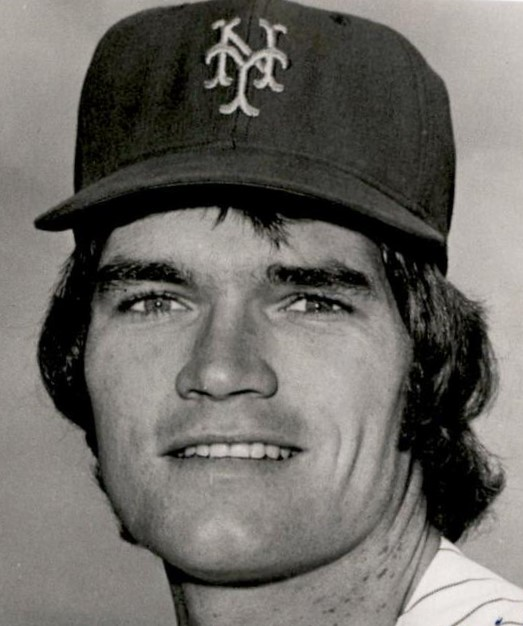
- Outfielder
- Born: November 10, 1951 (age 74); San Francisco, California, U.S.
- Batted: Right Threw: Right

MLB debut
- August 18, 1975, for the New York Mets

Last MLB appearance
- July 30, 1984, for the Los Angeles Dodgers

MLB statistics
- Batting average: .279
- Home runs: 34
- Runs batted in: 219
- Stats at Baseball Reference

Teams
- New York Mets (1975–1977); Cleveland Indians (1978); Chicago Cubs (1978–1980); Cincinnati Reds (1981–1982); San Francisco Giants (1983); Montreal Expos (1983); Los Angeles Dodgers (1984)

Michael Lewis Vail (born November 10, 1951) is an American former Major League Baseball outfielder.

== St. Louis Cardinals farm system ==
Vail was original drafted by the Los Angeles Dodgers in the seventeenth round of the 1970 Major League Baseball draft as a senior at Archbishop Mitty High School in San Jose, California. He declined, choosing, instead, to attend De Anza College. Seven months later, the St. Louis Cardinals selected him in the fourth round of the January 1971 secondary draft.

Through his first three seasons in the Cardinals' farm system, Vail batted .256 with 27 home runs and 158 runs batted in. In 1974, his fourth season in professional baseball split evenly between the class A Modesto Reds and the double A Arkansas Travelers, Vail batted .334 with fifteen home runs and 76 RBIs. After the season, he and shortstop Jack Heidemann were dealt to the New York Mets for infielder Ted Martinez.

== New York Mets ==
His first season in the Mets' organization, Vail batted .342 with seven home runs and 79 RBIs for the Tidewater Tides to earn the 1975 International League "Player of the Year" award. He was called up to the majors in August, and got a pinch hit single off Houston Astros ace J. R. Richard in his first major league at bat. On August 22, Vail went 2-for-5 against the San Francisco Giants. Three days later, Vail went 4-for-4 with two doubles and an RBI against the San Diego Padres. He was intentionally walked in his fifth plate appearance in the ninth inning. From there, he proceeded to tie a modern Major League rookie record 23 game hitting streak. Over the course of this streak, Vail batted .364 with three home runs and fifteen RBIs.

The streak ended on September 16, when he was unable to collect a hit in an eighteen inning marathon with the Montreal Expos in which he had seven at bats. At the time, it was also the longest hitting streak in Mets' franchise history (both records have since been broken). Vail's 23 game hitting streak still stands, as of 2019, as a New York Mets Rookie Record, and the ball in that 23rd game is on display in at the Baseball Hall of Fame in Cooperstown, New York.

Over the remainder of the season, Vail batted .211 with two RBIs and no home runs. Still, the Mets anointed Vail their "Player of the Future," and during the off-season, traded star right fielder Rusty Staub to the Detroit Tigers to make room for Vail in their outfield. Two months after this deal was completed, and just as Spring training was set to get underway, Vail dislocated his left foot playing basketball.

Vail did not return to the Mets until mid-June 1976, and saw just limited use through the end of the month. He assumed his starting job in right field in July, but batted just .190 with one RBI. He began hitting in the beginning of August, but soon fell off, and ended the season with a .217 batting average, nine RBIs and no home runs in nineteen fewer at bats than the previous season.

Vail got off to a slow start in 1977, batting .200 with three RBIs and no home runs through May 1. On May 2, he hit his first home run since September 8, 1975, and put together a 22-game stretch in which he batted .417 with two home runs and eight RBIs, and brought his average to a season high .363. He batted over .300 for much of the season, however, off months of August (.159 avg., 2 HR, 5 RBI) and September (.191 avg., 0 HR, 1 RBI) dropped his season average to .262 with a career high eight home runs and 35 RBIs.

== Cleveland Indians ==
After batting .143 during Spring training 1978, he was placed on waivers, and selected by the Cleveland Indians. He began the season in the minors, however, injuries soon opened up a major league roster spot. In his American League debut, Vail went 2-for-2, including a game winning, walk-off hit in the ninth. Despite this early success, Vail saw limited use during his time in Cleveland. On June 15, he was dealt to the Chicago Cubs for fellow outfielder Joe Wallis.

== Chicago Cubs ==
After a bunch of pinch hitter and late-inning defensive replacement appearances, Vail went 2-for-2 in his first start as a Cub. Over the month of July, Vail batted .347 with two home runs (including one on July 6, in his first game back at Shea Stadium since leaving the Mets) and twelve RBIs. For the season, Vail batted .333 with four home runs and 33 RBIs as a Cub.

In 1979, in a platoon with left-handed-hitting Scot Thompson in right field, Vail batted .335 with seven home runs and 35 RBIs. Herman Franks resigned as manager with seven games left in the season, naming several players whose attitudes he blamed for driving him out. One was Vail, who Franks labeled a "constant whiner who made him sick". Said Franks, "I just got tired of being around him. There isn't enough money in the world to pay me to manage if I have to look at that face every day."

1980 Cubs manager Preston Gomez stuck with the Thompson/Vail lefty/righty platoon. Vail was batting .305 with four home runs and 32 RBIs when Gomez was fired, and replaced with Joey Amalfitano (who served as interim manager for the last seven games of the 1979 season). Under Amalfitano, Vail's playing time reduced substantially (only thirteen starts in the last 72 games). After the season, Vail was traded to the Cincinnati Reds.

== Cincinnati Reds ==
With both Ken Griffey and George Foster having been dealt during the off-season, Vail saw much more playing time in the outfield in 1982 (he was only on the field for 11 innings all of 1981). In the first game of the season, Vail hit an RBI double off Willie Hernández — his first extra base hit in over a year. He made his first start as a Red 499 days after signing his first contract with the team on April 9, and went 1-for-3 with a double and a walk. On May 15, he capped off a five-run ninth inning against the Pittsburgh Pirates with a two-run home run, his first with the Reds. All told, Vail batted .254 with four home runs and 29 RBIs his second season in Cincinnati.

== 1983 season ==
On January 5, 1983, Vail was traded to the San Francisco Giants for pitcher Rich Gale. The San Francisco native was 0 for his first eleven Giants bats, until April 20, when his pivotal pinch hit single in the tenth inning led to an extra innings victory over the rival Dodgers. Vail's stay with his home town team was short and uneventful, however. On May 25, he was traded to the Montreal Expos for infielder Wallace Johnson.

On May 27, he homered in his first at bat as an Expo off Hall of Famer Steve Carlton. His second, and only other, home run in an Expos uniform also came off Carlton on June 29. Overall, he batted .283, mostly as a right-handed bat off the bench for Montreal.

== Los Angeles Dodgers ==
The Expos released Vail at the end of Spring training 1984. He caught on with the Dodgers in June, but only managed one hit and one walk in seventeen plate appearances. That one hit, however, was a walk off single to beat the Cardinals in extra innings on July 6.

== Career statistics ==
Seasons	Games	PA	AB	Runs	Hits	2B	3B	HR	RBI	SB	BB	HBP	SO	Avg.	OBP	Fld%
10	665	1705	1604	146	447	71	11	34	219	3	81	5	317	.279	.313	.969

Though he never lived up to his expectations, Vail still managed a respectable ten-year career. In three seasons and 275 games as a Cub, Vail batted .317 with seventeen home runs and 115 RBIs. While his greatest success was as a Cub, his greatest success was also against the Cubs, as he has a .365 career batting average against the Cubs.

Vail was roommates with "Macho Man" Randy Savage when both were teenage farmhands with the St. Louis Cardinals. In 1989, Vail played two games for the Orlando Juice of the Senior Professional Baseball Association.
