= Lynn McGlothen =

American baseball player (1950–1984)

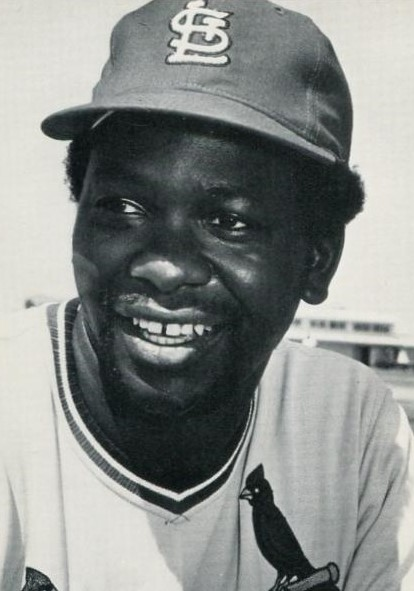
- Pitcher
- Born: March 27, 1950; Monroe, Louisiana, U.S.
- Died: August 14, 1984 (aged 34); Dubach, Louisiana, U.S.
- Batted: Left Threw: Right

MLB debut
- June 25, 1972, for the Boston Red Sox

Last MLB appearance
- September 19, 1982, for the New York Yankees

MLB statistics
- Win–loss record: 86–93
- Earned run average: 3.98
- Strikeouts: 939
- Stats at Baseball Reference

Teams
- Boston Red Sox (1972–1973); St. Louis Cardinals (1974–1976); San Francisco Giants (1977–1978); Chicago Cubs (1978–1981); Chicago White Sox (1981); New York Yankees (1982)

Career highlights and awards
- All-Star (1974)

Lynn Everett McGlothen (March 27, 1950 – August 14, 1984) was an American professional baseball player. He played in Major League Baseball as a right-handed pitcher from 1972 through 1982. He played for the Boston Red Sox (1972–1973), St. Louis Cardinals (1974–1976), San Francisco Giants (1977–1978), Chicago Cubs (1978–1981), Chicago White Sox (1981) and New York Yankees (1982). McGlothen was named to the National League team in the 1974 All-Star Game as a member of the St. Louis Cardinals.

== Baseball career ==
A native of Monroe, Louisiana, McGlothen graduated from Grambling High School in 1968. He then briefly attended Grambling State University. He was drafted by the Boston Red Sox in 1968. He pitched in part of two seasons for the Boston Red Sox. He had his first full season with the Cardinals in 1974, finishing 16–12 with a 2.70 ERA and an All-Star berth. He had 15 and 13 wins in 1975 and 1976, respectively, and was traded to the Giants for Ken Reitz on December 10, 1976. On August 19, 1975, he struck out three batters on nine pitches in the second inning of a 2–1 win over the powerful Cincinnati Reds after yielding a single by Tony Perez to begin the inning.

Hampered by a shoulder problem, McGlothen spent much of 1977 on the disabled list. He was sent from the Giants to the Cubs for Héctor Cruz at the trade deadline on June 15, 1978. He won 13 for the Cubs in 1979 and 12 in 1980, but elbow problems limited him to six starts with the Cubs and White Sox the following year before closing out his career with the Yankees in 1982.

In an 11-season career, McGlothen posted an 86–93 record with 939 strikeouts and a 3.98 ERA in 1492.2 innings.

Two years later, in 1984, McGlothen was killed at age 34. In a mobile home fire at around 2:00 AM in Dubach, Louisiana, the homeowner saved her own daughters, then went back in to save McGlothen. Both adults perished in the fire.
