= Héctor Cruz (baseball) =

Puerto Rican baseball player (born 1953)

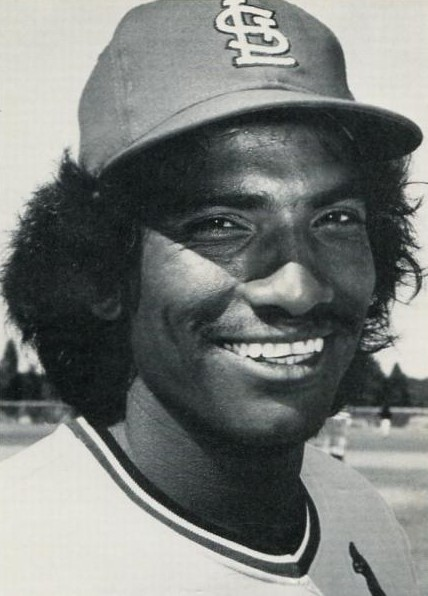
- Outfielder / Third baseman
- Born: April 2, 1953 (age 73); Arroyo, Puerto Rico
- Batted: Right Threw: Right

Professional debut
- MLB: August 11, 1973, for the St. Louis Cardinals
- NPB: 1983, for the Yomiuri Giants

Last appearance
- MLB: July 15, 1982, for the Chicago Cubs
- NPB: 1983, for the Yomiuri Giants

MLB statistics
- Batting average: .225
- Home runs: 39
- Runs batted in: 200
- Stats at Baseball Reference

Teams
- St. Louis Cardinals (1973, 1975–1977); Chicago Cubs (1978); San Francisco Giants (1978–1979); Cincinnati Reds (1979–1980); Chicago Cubs (1981–1982); Yomiuri Giants (1983)

Member of the Caribbean

Baseball Hall of Fame
- Induction: 2007

Héctor Louis Cruz Dilan (born April 2, 1953) is a Puerto Rican former professional baseball outfielder and third baseman. He played in Major League Baseball (MLB) between 1973 and 1982 for four different teams, and played in Nippon Professional Baseball (NPB) in 1983. Listed at 5 feet 11 inches (1.80 m) and 170 pounds (77 kg), he batted and threw right-handed. He is also known by his nickname Heity.

== Career ==
Born in Arroyo, Cruz came from a distinguished baseball family of Puerto Rico. He is the younger brother of former major leaguers José and Tommy Cruz, while his nephew José Cruz Jr. also played in the majors.

Cruz played in the Cardinals minor league system from 1970 through 1973. He debuted with the big team in September 1973, but was demoted to the minors again the following year. In 1975, Cruz won The Sporting News Minor League Player of the Year Award after hitting 29 home runs and 116 RBIs for the Tulsa Oilers of the American Association. He also appeared in 23 games for the Cardinals in 1975, staying with them for three seasons before joining the Chicago Cubs in 1978. He was dealt from the Cubs to the San Francisco Giants for Lynn McGlothen at the trade deadline on June 15, 1978. He also played for the Cincinnati Reds (1979–1980) and finished his major league career back with the Cubs (1981–1982).

In 1976, his first regular season with the Cardinals, Cruz topped the National League rookies with 13 homers and 71 RBIs, but also led the league third basemen with 26 errors. Then he switched to outfield, although he did not play regularly for the rest of his career. In a nine-season career, Cruz was a .225 hitter with 39 home runs and 200 RBIs in 624 games appearances. After that, he played in Japan for the Yomiuri Giants in 1983.

Following his playing retirement, he worked for the United States Postal Service as a mail carrier on the West Side of Chicago. In 2007, Cruz gained induction into the Caribbean Baseball Hall of Fame as part of its 11th class.

== See also ==
- List of Major League Baseball players from Puerto Rico
