= Alberto Lois =

Dominican baseball player (1956–2019)

- Pinch runner / Outfielder
- Born: May 6, 1956; Hato Mayor del Rey, Dominican Republic
- Died: March 12, 2019 (aged 62); Consuelo, Dominican Republic
- Batted: Right Threw: Right

MLB debut
- September 8, 1978, for the Pittsburgh Pirates

Last MLB appearance
- September 29, 1979, for the Pittsburgh Pirates

MLB statistics
- Games played: 14
- At bats: 4
- Hits: 1
- Batting average: .250
- Stats at Baseball Reference

Teams
- Pittsburgh Pirates (1978–1979)
Medals
Men's baseball
Representing Dominican Republic
Central American and Caribbean Games
Silver medal – second place	1974 Santo Domingo	Team

Alberto Lois (May 6, 1956 – March 12, 2019) was a Dominican Major League Baseball player. Lois played for the Pittsburgh Pirates in 1978 and 1979. He was used primarily as a pinch runner, but was also an outfielder.

On January 5, 1980, Lois sustained serious injuries in a vehicular accident in the Dominican Republic when the truck he was driving collided with a train that was parked, unlit, in the middle of a grade crossing. Six of the nine people in the truck were killed. Lois was thrown from the vehicle; he was unconscious for six days, and damage to his right eye ended his career in professional baseball.

== Personal life ==
Lois was of Haitian descent. He died at his home on March 12, 2019.
