= Jim Obradovich (baseball) =

American baseball player (1949–2012)

- First baseman
- Born: September 13, 1949; Fort Campbell, Kentucky, U.S.
- Died: March 3, 2012 (aged 62); Lancaster, Kentucky, U.S.
- Batted: Left Threw: Left

MLB debut
- September 12, 1978, for the Houston Astros

Last MLB appearance
- September 29, 1978, for the Houston Astros

MLB statistics
- Batting average: .176
- Home runs: 0
- Runs batted in: 2
- Stats at Baseball Reference

Teams
- Houston Astros (1978)

James Thomas Obradovich (September 13, 1949 – March 3, 2012) was an American professional baseball player who appeared in ten Major League games for the Houston Astros in September of 1978, mostly as a pinch hitter, but also as a first baseman. He threw and batted left-handed, stood 6 feet 2 inches (1.88 m) tall and weighed 200 pounds (91 kg).

A native of Fort Campbell, Kentucky, and the son of a military officer, Obradovich attended high school in Fort Knox, Kentucky, and signed with the Minnesota Twins in 1967 after being taken in the 24th round of the 1967 Major League Baseball draft. He missed the 1971 and 1972 minor league seasons while serving in Germany for the United States Army. He was in his tenth full professional baseball season when he was recalled by Houston in 1978, after he batted a career-high .306 with 21 home runs and 85 runs batted in for the Triple-A Charleston Charlies.

Obradovich started three games at first base for Houston during the season's final weeks. In 17 at bats, he collected three hits, including one triple — hit off eventual Hall of Famer Gaylord Perry of the San Diego Padres on September 16. The blow knocked in the only Astro run in a 2–1 defeat.

After spending the 1979 season at Charleston, he spent the next three seasons in the Mexican League before retiring.

== Sources ==
- Career statistics from Baseball Reference · Retrosheet · Baseball Almanac
