= Mike Grace (third baseman) =

American baseball player (born 1956)

- Third baseman / Pinch hitter
- Born: June 14, 1956 (age 70); Pontiac, Michigan, U.S.
- Batted: Right Threw: Right

MLB debut
- April 18, 1978, for the Cincinnati Reds

Last MLB appearance
- May 1, 1978, for the Cincinnati Reds

MLB statistics
- Games played: 5
- At bats: 3
- Hits: 0
- Stats at Baseball Reference

Teams
- Cincinnati Reds (1978)

Michael Lee Grace (born June 14, 1956) is an American former Major League Baseball player. Grace played in five games for the Cincinnati Reds in 1978 as a third baseman and pinch hitter.
