= Arturo DeFreites =

Dominican baseball player (born 1953)

- First baseman
- Born: April 26, 1953 (age 72); San Pedro de Macorís, Dominican Republic
- Batted: Right Threw: Right

MLB debut
- September 7, 1978, for the Cincinnati Reds

Last MLB appearance
- June 27, 1979, for the Cincinnati Reds

MLB statistics
- Batting average: .208
- Home runs: 1
- Runs batted in: 6
- Stats at Baseball Reference

Teams
- Cincinnati Reds (1978–1979)

Arturo Marcelino DeFreites Simon (born April 26, 1953) is a Dominican former professional baseball first baseman. He played parts of two seasons in Major League Baseball, 1978 and 1979, for the Cincinnati Reds.

Following his major league career, DeFreites played in the Mexican League from 1980 until 1986. He was also a minor league baseball manager for the Gulf Coast League Expos in 2004 and the Dorados de Chihuahua in 2009.
