= Bill Bonham =

American baseball player (born 1948)

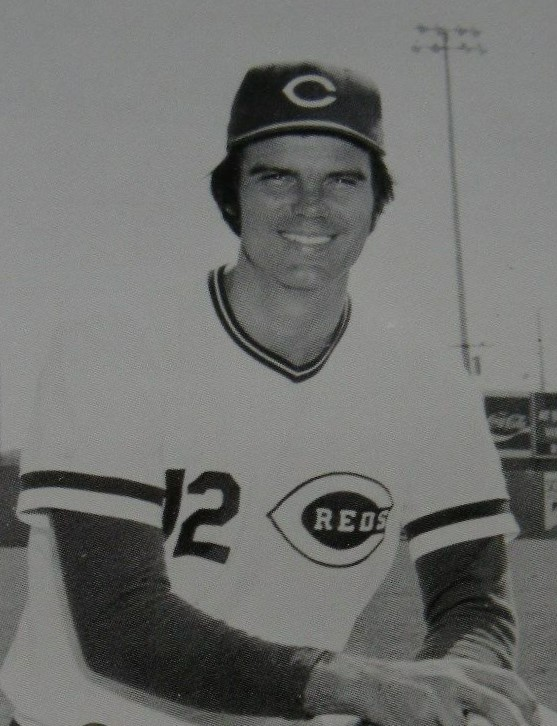
- Pitcher
- Born: October 1, 1948 (age 77); Glendale, California, U.S.
- Batted: Right Threw: Right

MLB debut
- April 7, 1971, for the Chicago Cubs

Last MLB appearance
- July 26, 1980, for the Cincinnati Reds

MLB statistics
- Win–loss record: 75–83
- Earned run average: 4.01
- Strikeouts: 985
- Stats at Baseball Reference

Teams
- Chicago Cubs (1971–1977); Cincinnati Reds (1978–1980)

William Gordon Bonham (born October 1, 1948) is an American former pitcher for the Chicago Cubs (1971–77) and Cincinnati Reds (1978–80). He played for the UCLA Bruins and was a member of the 1969 College World Series team with Chris Chambliss.

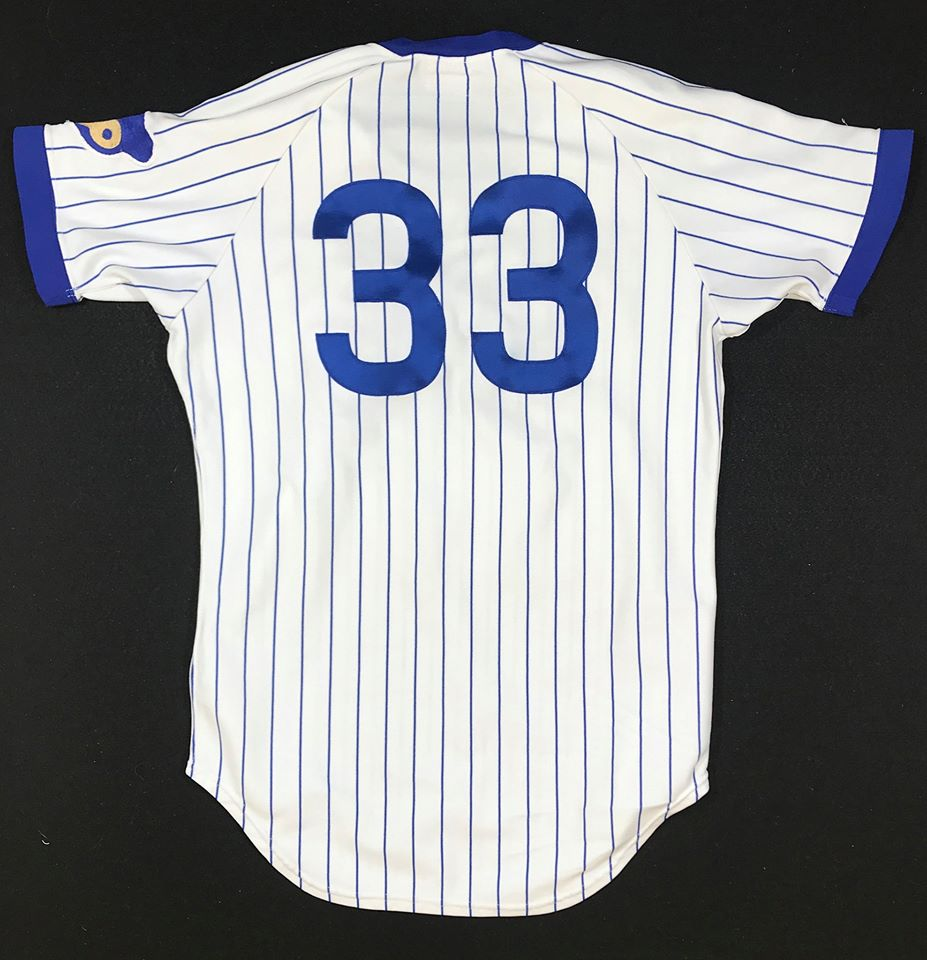
1973 Chicago Cubs #33 Bill Bonham game worn home jersey

He helped the Reds win the 1979 National League Western Division.

Bonham led the National League in losses (22) in 1974.

On July 31, 1974, Bonham tied a Major League record (shared by 49 pitchers) by striking out four batters in an inning (2nd).

He also led the National League in earned runs allowed (120) in 1975.

In 10 years he had a 75–83 win–loss record and had 300 games, 214 games started, 27 complete games, 4 shutouts, 33 games finished, 11 saves, 1,487 1/3 innings pitched, 1,512 hits allowed, 743 runs allowed, 662 earned runs allowed, 98 home runs allowed, 636 walks allowed, 985 strikeouts, 35 hit batsmen, 68 wild pitches, 6,484 batters faced, 57 intentional walks, 19 balks and a 4.01 ERA.

== See also ==
- List of Major League Baseball single-inning strikeout leaders
