= Scot Thompson (baseball) =

American baseball player (born 1955)

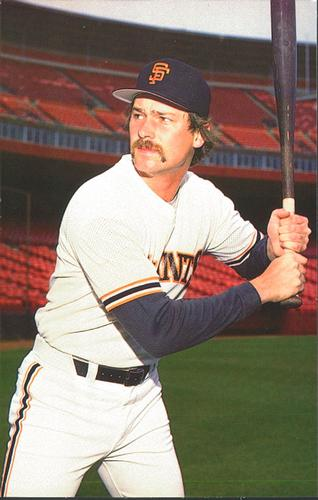
- Outfielder / First baseman
- Born: December 7, 1955 (age 70); Grove City, Pennsylvania, U.S.
- Batted: Left Threw: Left

MLB debut
- September 3, 1978, for the Chicago Cubs

Last MLB appearance
- October 4, 1985, for the Montreal Expos

MLB statistics
- Batting average: .262
- Home runs: 5
- Runs batted in: 110
- Stats at Baseball Reference

Teams
- Chicago Cubs (1978–1983); San Francisco Giants (1984–1985); Montreal Expos (1985)

Vernon Scot Thompson (born December 7, 1955) is an American former professional baseball player who played outfield in the Major Leagues from 1978 to 1985 for the Chicago Cubs, Montreal Expos, and San Francisco Giants.

He was born in Grove City, Pennsylvania. He is the brother-in-law to former Cubs teammate and pitcher Rick Reuschel, who married his sister Barbara on July 12, 1988.
