= Frank Riccelli =

American baseball player (born 1953)

- Pitcher
- Born: February 24, 1953 (age 73); Syracuse, New York, U.S.
- Batted: Left Threw: Left

MLB debut
- September 11, 1976, for the San Francisco Giants

Last MLB appearance
- June 17, 1979, for the Houston Astros

MLB statistics
- Win–loss record: 3-3
- Earned run average: 4.39
- Strikeouts: 32
- Stats at Baseball Reference

Teams
- San Francisco Giants (1976); Houston Astros (1978–1979)

Frank Joseph Riccelli (born February 24, 1953) is an American former Major League Baseball pitcher. He pitched parts of three seasons in the majors, 1976 for the San Francisco Giants, and 1978 and 1979 for the Houston Astros.

Riccelli attended Christian Brothers Academy in DeWitt, New York, where he was a high school baseball standout. He was three times named to the All-Central New York team. As a junior in 1970, he had an earned run average of 0.74 and 140 strikeouts in 73 innings. As a senior in 1971, he struck out 139 batters in 65 innings. He was selected by the San Francisco Giants with the eighteenth pick of the 1971 MLB draft, ahead of future Hall of Famers George Brett and Mike Schmidt.

Riccelli began his professional career in Montana in 1971 with the Great Falls Giants. In 1972, with the Amarillo Giants, Riccelli had 16 and 17-strikeout games en route to a 183-strikeout season, a total he would not top again in any one year.

On September 11, 1976, Riccelli made his Major League debut. He and Bob Knepper, who had debuted the day before, became the first starting pitchers in San Francisco Giants history to make their debuts in consecutive games. Riccelli finished the season in the Major Leagues before returning to the Triple-A Phoenix Giants for the entirety of the following season.

On October 25, 1976, Riccelli was traded to the St. Louis Cardinals for a player to be named later. On June 8, 1978, the Cardinals sent Riccelli to Houston for Bob Coluccio. Riccelli would appear in two games for the Astros that year, pitching three scoreless innings. During a start in 1979, Riccelli suffered an injury which required him to undergo Tommy John surgery. He returned to baseball with the Pittsburgh Pirates and Toronto Blue Jays organizations in 1980 and 1981 respectively but never returned to the Major Leagues.

He later pitched for the Gold Coast Suns in the Senior Professional Baseball Association.

== Sources ==
- Career statistics from Baseball Reference · Baseball Reference (Minors) · Retrosheet · Baseball Almanac
