= Jesús Figueroa =

Dominican baseball player (born 1957)

Toronto Blue Jays – No. 65
- Outfielder / Batting practice pitcher
- Born: February 20, 1957 (age 68); Villa Mella, Santo Domingo, Dominican Republic
- Batted: Left Threw: Left

MLB debut
- April 22, 1980, for the Chicago Cubs

Last MLB appearance
- October 5, 1980, for the Chicago Cubs

MLB statistics
- Batting average: .253
- Home runs: 1
- Runs batted in: 11
- Stats at Baseball Reference

Teams
- As a player: Chicago Cubs (1980); As a batting practice pitcher: Toronto Blue Jays (1989–present)

Jesús Maria Figueroa (born February 20, 1957) is a Dominican former professional baseball player. He appeared in 115 games during the 1980 baseball season with the Chicago Cubs, mostly as a pinch hitter and defensive replacement. Figueroa also played 611 games in Minor League Baseball, over the course of nine seasons.

Figueroa works for the Toronto Blue Jays as their batting practice pitcher, a position he has held since 1989. He was a member of the 1992 and '93 teams that won back-to-back World Series.
