= Joe Ferguson (baseball) =

American baseball player (born 1946)

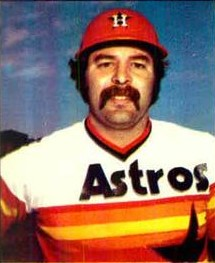
- Catcher / Right fielder
- Born: September 19, 1946 (age 80); San Francisco, California, U.S.
- Batted: Right Threw: Right

MLB debut
- September 12, 1970, for the Los Angeles Dodgers

Last MLB appearance
- June 17, 1983, for the California Angels

MLB statistics
- Batting average: .240
- Home runs: 122
- Runs batted in: 445
- Stats at Baseball Reference

Teams
- As player: Los Angeles Dodgers (1970–1976); St. Louis Cardinals (1976); Houston Astros (1977–1978); Los Angeles Dodgers (1978–1981); California Angels (1981–1983); As coach: Texas Rangers (1986–1987); Los Angeles Dodgers (1988–1994)

Career highlights and awards
- World Series champion (1988)

Joseph Vance Ferguson (born September 19, 1946) is an American former professional baseball player and coach. He played as a catcher in Major League Baseball from 1970 to 1983 for the Los Angeles Dodgers, St. Louis Cardinals, Houston Astros, and the California Angels. After his playing career, Ferguson became a coach and minor league manager.

== Career ==
Ferguson in 1973 for Los Angeles Dodgers

Prior to his professional baseball career, Ferguson played baseball but also basketball at the University of the Pacific in Stockton, CA. In fact, he played in the West Regional Final in March 1967, where Pacific fell to eventual National champion UCLA, led by sophomore Kareem Abdul-Jabbar.

Ferguson reached the majors in 1970 with the Los Angeles Dodgers, becoming their everyday catcher in 1973. He set a major league record for catchers by committing only three errors, leading the National League catchers in fielding percentage (.996) and double plays (17), while hitting .263 with a .369 on-base percentage. He also reached career-highs in games played (136), home runs (25), RBI (88), runs (84), doubles (26) and walks (87).

When Steve Yeager became a regular behind the plate midseason in 1973, Ferguson split his catching duties with playing right field against left-handed pitchers. He soon became known for having one of the strongest throwing arms of any outfielder in the major leagues. In Game One of the 1974 World Series he stepped in front of center fielder Jimmy Wynn in deep right-center field to catch Reggie Jackson's high fly ball and proceeded to throw a 300-foot strike to catcher Yeager who tagged out Sal Bando in a collision at home plate to end the top of the eighth inning. He explained after the game that Wynn had been bothered by a shoulder problem in his throwing arm all season long and added, "There was never any worry about a collision between us. We talked about it earlier in the game that if such a flyball like that was hit with a guy on third base that if I could get there I'd take it. I'd make the throw. I didn't realize how good the throw was because my sunglasses slipped over my eyes." In Game Two, Ferguson hit a two-run homer off Vida Blue to provide the only Dodgers' victory in the Series. He enjoyed another fine season in 1977 with Houston, catching 122 games and hitting 16 home runs with 61 RBI and a .379 OBP. Reacquired by the Dodgers in the 1978 midseason, he helped his team reach the 1978 World Series.

After retiring, he coached at the major league level with the Texas Rangers (1986–87), working under former Dodger teammate Bobby Valentine, and the Dodgers (1988–94). He also managed in the Dodgers, Baltimore Orioles and San Diego Padres minor league systems. He managed the Camden Riversharks Atlantic League baseball team in New Jersey for 3 seasons from 2007 - 2009.

In a 14-season career, Ferguson was a power-hitter who was very efficient at getting on base. Although he only had a .240 batting average, he had a .358 on-base percentage to go along with 122 home runs and 445 RBI in 1013 games. In 13 postseason games he batted .200, but had an excellent .378 on-base percentage to go along with 1 HR and 4 RBI's.

Preceded by Tim Blackwell	High Desert Mavericks Manager; 1996	Succeeded by Chris Speier
Preceded by Tim Blackwell	Bowie Baysox Manager; 1997-1999	Succeeded by Andy Etchebarren
Preceded by Butch Davis	Delmarva Shorebirds Manager; 2000-2002	Succeeded by Stan Hough
