= 1978 New York Mets season =

1978 New York Mets
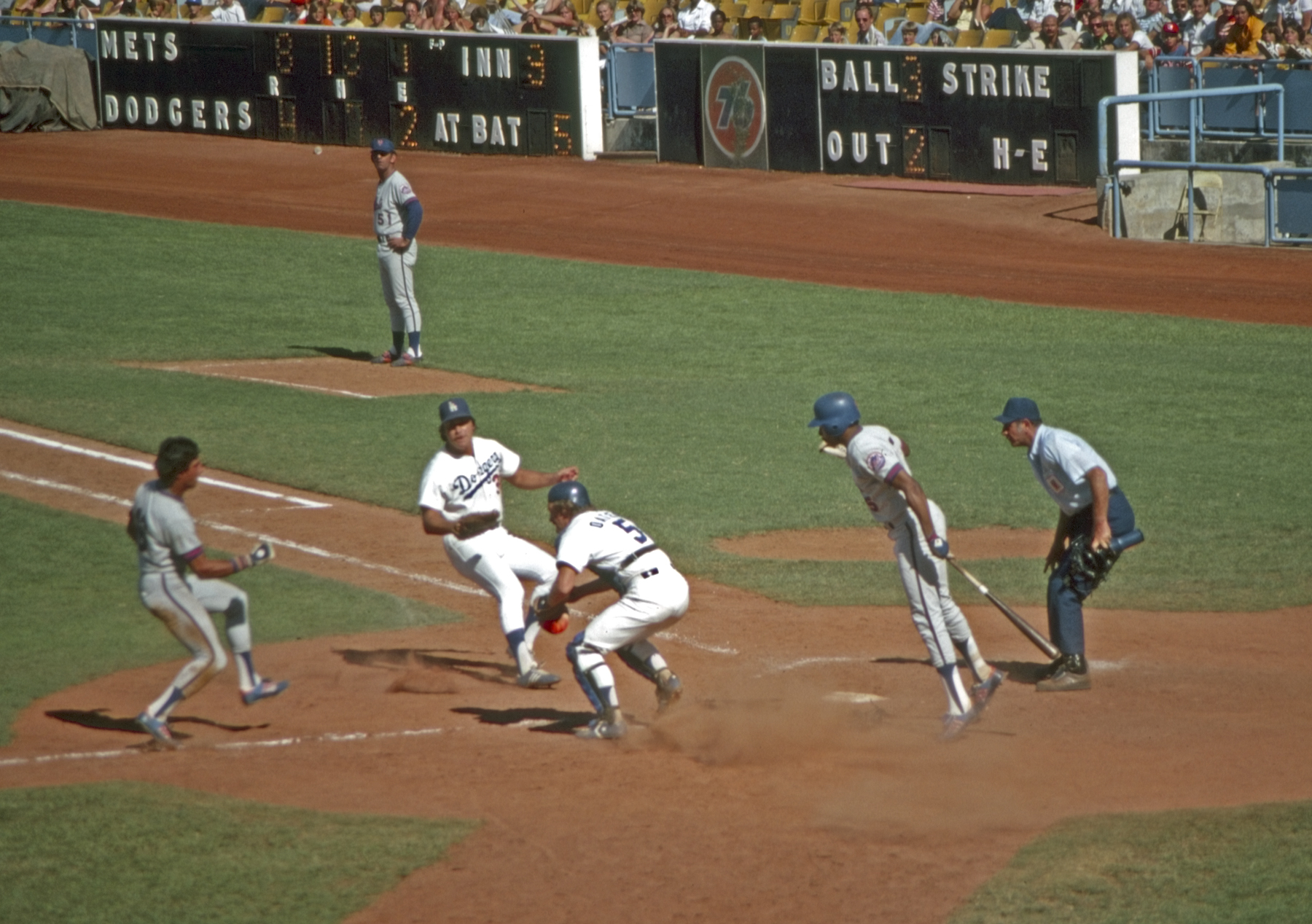
- League: National League
- Division: East
- Ballpark: Shea Stadium
- City: New York City, New York
- Record: 66–96 (.407)
- Divisional place: 6th
- Owners: Charles Shipman Payson
- General manager: Joe McDonald
- Manager: Joe Torre
- Television: WWOR-TV
- Radio: WMCA (Ralph Kiner, Lindsey Nelson, Bob Murphy)
- Stats: ESPN.com; Baseball Reference

The 1978 New York Mets season was the 17th regular season for the Mets, who played their home games at Shea Stadium. Led by manager Joe Torre, the team had a 66–96 record and finished in sixth place in the National League East, twenty-four games behind the first place Philadelphia Phillies.

== Offseason ==
- November 21, 1977: Tom Hausman was signed by the Mets as a free agent.
- November 30: Elliott Maddox was signed by the Mets as a free agent.
- December 6: Kevin Kobel was purchased by the Mets from the Milwaukee Brewers.
- December 7: Tim Foli was purchased by the Mets from the San Francisco Giants.
- December 8: In an unusual four-team trade, the Atlanta Braves sent Willie Montañez to the Mets, the Texas Rangers sent Adrian Devine, Tommy Boggs and Eddie Miller to the Braves; Tom Grieve and a player to be named later to the Mets, and Bert Blyleven to the Pittsburgh Pirates. The Pirates sent Al Oliver and Nelson Norman to the Rangers, and the Mets sent Jon Matlack to the Rangers and John Milner to the Pirates. The Rangers later sent Ken Henderson to the Mets to complete the trade (March 15, 1978).
- December 9: Roy Staiger was traded by the Mets to the New York Yankees for Sergio Ferrer.
- January 10, 1978: Ricky Jones was drafted by the Mets in the 5th round of the 1978 Major League Baseball draft but did not sign.
- March 26: Mike Vail was claimed on waivers from the Mets by the Cleveland Indians.
- April 5: Butch Metzger claimed on waivers by the Mets from the St. Louis Cardinals.

== Regular season ==
On May 1, in a game against the Mets, Atlanta Braves manager Bobby Cox was ejected from a game for the first time in his career. Cox would go on to set the record for most ejections by a manager.

On June 16, in his 12th major league season speckled with near-misses, Tom Seaver, now of the Cincinnati Reds, finally hurls a no-hitter. The Cardinals are the 4–0 victims as Seaver strikes out 3 batters.

=== Season summary ===
Expectations were low for the Mets heading into the 1978 season. The Amazin's only drew 11,736 for the season opener at Shea, which had acquired the nickname "Grant's Tomb." The Mets beat the Montreal Expos 3–1. Opening Day starter Jerry Koosman struck out seven in his complete game victory.

From there, things went poorly for Koosman and the Mets. He only won two more games with the Mets in 1978, versus 15 losses despite a respectable 3.75 earned run average. His third win of the season came on July 13 in Cincinnati against Tom Seaver. Following the season, Koosman would be traded to the Minnesota Twins for Jesse Orosco and Greg Field. Koosman had gone 11–35 in his last two seasons as a Met, bringing his career mark to 140–137—not nearly indicative of the stellar career he had with the Mets.

The ace of the staff turned out to be Pat Zachry, whom they'd acquired on June 15, 1977, as part of the infamous "Midnight Massacre", when he, Doug Flynn, Dan Norman and Steve Henderson were traded to the Mets from the Reds for Seaver.

Zachry had a 10–4 record, and was selected by Tommy Lasorda as the sole Mets representative on the National League All-Star team, but did not play. After dropping his next two decisions, On July 24, Zachry was the starting pitcher against the Cincinnati Reds for the largest crowd of the season at Shea (35,939) as Pete Rose entered the game with a 36-game hitting streak. Rose was 0–3 until a seventh inning single gave him a 37-game hitting streak to tie the N.L. record. Four batters latter, Zachry was pulled in favor of Kevin Kobel. Frustrated, Zachry went to kick a batting helmet sitting on the dugout steps, missed the helmet and kicked the step—fracturing his left foot, and ending his season. In his absence, Craig Swan assumed the role of staff ace. Swan went 7–1 following the injury to Zachry, leading the National League with a 2.43 ERA for the season.

With his hard, physical play, catcher John Stearns emerged as a Mets fan favorite for a team with desperately few stars. On April 8, he triggered a bench-clearing brawl by running into Montreal Expos catcher Gary Carter at the plate. On June 30, Stearns defeated the Pittsburgh Pirates by tagging out Dave Parker to end the game. Parker, who had run over two other catchers in the previous two weeks, suffered a broken cheekbone in the collision with Stearns. When the Pirates in-state rivals (also the Mets' own division rivals), the Philadelphia Phillies, next came to New York, they thanked Stearns for standing up to Parker. Stearns also led the Mets in stolen bases with 25, and in the process broke the National League record for catchers, which had been held by Johnny Kling since 1902.

=== Season standings ===
NL East
Team	W	L	Pct.	GB	Home	Road
Philadelphia Phillies	90	72	.556	—	54‍–‍28	36‍–‍44
Pittsburgh Pirates	88	73	.547	1½	55‍–‍26	33‍–‍47
Chicago Cubs	79	83	.488	11	44‍–‍38	35‍–‍45
Montreal Expos	76	86	.469	14	41‍–‍39	35‍–‍47
St. Louis Cardinals	69	93	.426	21	37‍–‍44	32‍–‍49
New York Mets	66	96	.407	24	33‍–‍47	33‍–‍49

=== Record vs. opponents ===
1978 National League record Sources:
Team	ATL	CHC	CIN	HOU	LAD	MON	NYM	PHI	PIT	SD	SF	STL
Atlanta	—	5–7	6–12	8–10	5–13	5–7	6–6	8–4	2–10	8–10	11–7	5–7
Chicago	7–5	—	7–5	6–6	4–8	7–11	11–7	4–14	7–11	7–5	4–8	15–3
Cincinnati	12–6	5–7	—	11–7	9–9	8–4	7–5	7–5	4–7	9–9	12–6	8–4
Houston	10–8	6–6	7–11	—	7–11	6–6	7–5	6–6	4–8	8–10	6–12	7–5
Los Angeles	13–5	8–4	9–9	11–7	—	8–4	7–5	7–5	7–5	9–9	11–7	5–7
Montreal	7–5	11–7	4–8	6–6	4–8	—	8–10	9–9	7–11	6–6	5–7	9–9
New York	6–6	7–11	5–7	5–7	5–7	10–8	—	6–12	7–11	5–7	3–9	7–11
Philadelphia	4-8	14–4	5–7	6–6	5–7	9–9	12–6	—	11–7	8–4	6–6	10–8
Pittsburgh	10–2	11–7	7–4	8–4	5–7	11–7	11–7	7–11	—	5–7	4–8	9–9
San Diego	10–8	5–7	9–9	10–8	9–9	6–6	7–5	4–8	7–5	—	8–10	9–3
San Francisco	7–11	8–4	6–12	12–6	7–11	7–5	9–3	6–6	8–4	10–8	—	9–3
St. Louis	7–5	3–15	4–8	5–7	7–5	9–9	11–7	8–10	9–9	3–9	3–9	—

=== Opening Day lineup ===
1. Lenny Randle 3B
2. Tim Foli SS
3. Steve Henderson LF
4. Willie Montañez 1B
5. Ken Henderson RF
6. Lee Mazzilli CF
7. John Stearns C
8. Doug Flynn 2B
9. Jerry Koosman P

=== Notable transactions ===
- May 19, 1978: Ken Henderson was traded by the Mets to the Cincinnati Reds for Dale Murray.
- June 6: 1978 Major League Baseball draft
  - Hubie Brooks was drafted in the 1st round (3rd overall) by the Mets.
  - Brian Giles was drafted in the 3rd round by the Mets.
  - Mike Fitzgerald was drafted in the fifth round by the Mets.
  - Mark Davis was drafted by the Mets in the 22nd round but did not sign.
  - Rick Anderson was drafted by the Mets in the 24th round.
- July 4: Butch Metzger was purchased from the Mets by the Philadelphia Phillies.
- July 28: Gil Flores was claimed on waivers by the Mets from the California Angels.

=== Roster ===
1978 New York Mets
Roster
Pitchers: 43,48 Juan Berenguer; 28 Dwight Bernard; 26 Mike Bruhert; 47 Mardie Cornejo; 39 Nino Espinosa; 32 Tom Hausman; 31 Roy Lee Jackson; 49 Kevin Kobel; 36 Jerry Koosman; 38 Skip Lockwood; 45 Butch Metzger; 22 Dale Murray; 44 Bob Myrick; 43 Paul Siebert; 27 Craig Swan; 40 Pat Zachry	Catchers: 15,19 Butch Benton; 42 Ron Hodges; 12 John Stearns; 6 Alex Treviño; Infielders: 1,3 Sergio Ferrer; 23 Doug Flynn; 19 Tim Foli; 25 Willie Montañez; 11 Lenny Randle; 1 Bobby Valentine	Outfielders: 4 Bruce Boisclair; 17 Gil Flores; 3 Tom Grieve; 20 Ken Henderson; 5 Steve Henderson; 7 Ed Kranepool; 21 Elliott Maddox; 16 Lee Mazzilli; 8 Dan Norman; 18 Joel Youngblood	Manager: 9 Joe Torre; Coaches: 50 Phil Cavarretta; 53 Dal Maxvill; 24 Willie Mays; 52 Joe Pignatano; 51 Denny Sommers; 54 Rube Walker

== Player stats ==
=== Batting ===
==== Starters by position ====
Note: Pos = Position; G = Games played; AB = At bats; H = Hits; Avg. = Batting average; HR = Home runs; RBI = Runs batted in

Pos	Player	G	AB	H	Avg.	HR	RBI
C	John Stearns	143	477	126	.264	15	73
1B	Willie Montañez	159	609	156	.256	17	96
2B	Doug Flynn	156	532	126	.237	0	36
3B	Lenny Randle	132	437	102	.233	2	35
SS	Tim Foli	113	413	106	.257	1	27
LF	Steve Henderson	157	587	156	.266	10	65
CF	Lee Mazzilli	148	542	148	.273	16	61
RF	Elliott Maddox	119	389	100	.257	2	39

==== Other batters ====
Note: G = Games played; AB = At bats; H = Hits; Avg. = Batting average; HR = Home runs; RBI = Runs batted in

Player	G	AB	H	Avg.	HR	RBI
Joel Youngblood	113	266	67	.252	7	30
Bruce Boisclair	107	214	48	.224	4	15
Bobby Valentine	69	160	43	.269	1	18
Ron Hodges	47	102	26	.255	0	7
Tom Grieve	54	101	21	.208	2	8
Ed Kranepool	66	81	17	.210	3	19
Dan Norman	19	64	17	.266	4	10
Sergio Ferrer	37	33	7	.212	0	1
Gil Flores	11	29	8	.276	0	1
Ken Henderson	7	22	5	.227	1	4
Alex Treviño	6	12	3	.250	0	0
Butch Benton	4	4	2	.500	0	2

=== Pitching ===
==== Starting pitchers ====
Note: G = Games pitched; IP = Innings pitched; W = Wins; L = Losses; ERA = Earned run average; SO = Strikeouts

Player	G	IP	W	L	ERA	SO
Jerry Koosman	38	235.1	3	15	3.75	160
Craig Swan	29	207.1	9	6	2.43	125
Nino Espinosa	32	203.2	11	15	4.73	76
Pat Zachry	21	138.0	10	6	3.33	78
Mike Bruhert	27	133.2	4	11	4.78	56
Tom Hausman	10	51.2	3	3	4.70	16

==== Other pitchers ====
Note: G = Games pitched; IP = Innings pitched; W = Wins; L = Losses; ERA = Earned run average; SO = Strikeouts

Player	G	IP	W	L	ERA	SO
Kevin Kobel	32	108.1	5	6	2.91	51
Juan Berenguer	5	13.0	0	2	8.31	8
Roy Lee Jackson	4	12.2	0	0	9.24	6

==== Relief pitchers ====
Note: G = Games pitched; W = Wins; L = Losses; SV = Saves; ERA = Earned run average; SO = Strikeouts

Player	G	W	L	SV	ERA	SO
Skip Lockwood	57	7	13	15	3.57	73
Dale Murray	53	8	5	5	3.65	37
Dwight Bernard	30	1	4	0	4.31	26
Paul Siebert	27	0	2	1	5.14	12
Butch Metzger	25	1	3	0	6.51	21
Mardie Cornejo	25	4	2	3	2.45	17
Bob Myrick	17	0	3	0	3.28	13

== Farm system ==
Level	Team	League	Manager
AAA	Tidewater Tides	International League	Frank Verdi
AA	Jackson Mets	Texas League	Bob Wellman
A	Lynchburg Mets	Carolina League	Jack Aker
A	Wausau Mets	Midwest League	Dan Monzon
A-Short Season	Little Falls Mets	New York–Penn League	Chris Krug

LEAGUE CHAMPIONS: Lynchburg
