= 1978 Philadelphia Phillies season =

1978 Philadelphia Phillies
- National League East champions
- League: National League
- Division: East
- Ballpark: Veterans Stadium
- City: Philadelphia
- Owners: R. R. M. "Ruly" Carpenter III
- General managers: Paul Owens
- Managers: Danny Ozark
- Television: WPHL-TV
- Radio: KYW (Harry Kalas, Richie Ashburn, Andy Musser, Chris Wheeler)

The 1978 Philadelphia Phillies season was the 96th season in the history of the franchise. The Phillies won their third straight National League East title with a record of 90–72, a game and a half over the Pittsburgh Pirates, as the Phillies defeated the Pirates in Pittsburgh on the next to last day of the season. For the third consecutive season the Phillies came up short in the NLCS, as the Los Angeles Dodgers defeated them three games to one, as they had the previous season. The Phillies were managed by Danny Ozark and played their home games at Veterans Stadium.

== Offseason ==
- March 7, 1978: George Bell was signed as an amateur free agent by the Phillies.
- March 24, 1978: Fred Andrews was traded by the Phillies to the New York Mets for Bud Harrelson.

== Regular season ==
=== Season standings ===
NL East
Team	W	L	Pct.	GB	Home	Road
Philadelphia Phillies	90	72	.556	—	54‍–‍28	36‍–‍44
Pittsburgh Pirates	88	73	.547	1½	55‍–‍26	33‍–‍47
Chicago Cubs	79	83	.488	11	44‍–‍38	35‍–‍45
Montreal Expos	76	86	.469	14	41‍–‍39	35‍–‍47
St. Louis Cardinals	69	93	.426	21	37‍–‍44	32‍–‍49
New York Mets	66	96	.407	24	33‍–‍47	33‍–‍49

=== Record vs. opponents ===
1978 National League record Sources:
Team	ATL	CHC	CIN	HOU	LAD	MON	NYM	PHI	PIT	SD	SF	STL
Atlanta	—	5–7	6–12	8–10	5–13	5–7	6–6	8–4	2–10	8–10	11–7	5–7
Chicago	7–5	—	7–5	6–6	4–8	7–11	11–7	4–14	7–11	7–5	4–8	15–3
Cincinnati	12–6	5–7	—	11–7	9–9	8–4	7–5	7–5	4–7	9–9	12–6	8–4
Houston	10–8	6–6	7–11	—	7–11	6–6	7–5	6–6	4–8	8–10	6–12	7–5
Los Angeles	13–5	8–4	9–9	11–7	—	8–4	7–5	7–5	7–5	9–9	11–7	5–7
Montreal	7–5	11–7	4–8	6–6	4–8	—	8–10	9–9	7–11	6–6	5–7	9–9
New York	6–6	7–11	5–7	5–7	5–7	10–8	—	6–12	7–11	5–7	3–9	7–11
Philadelphia	4-8	14–4	5–7	6–6	5–7	9–9	12–6	—	11–7	8–4	6–6	10–8
Pittsburgh	10–2	11–7	7–4	8–4	5–7	11–7	11–7	7–11	—	5–7	4–8	9–9
San Diego	10–8	5–7	9–9	10–8	9–9	6–6	7–5	4–8	7–5	—	8–10	9–3
San Francisco	7–11	8–4	6–12	12–6	7–11	7–5	9–3	6–6	8–4	10–8	—	9–3
St. Louis	7–5	3–15	4–8	5–7	7–5	9–9	11–7	8–10	9–9	3–9	3–9	—

=== Notable transactions ===
- April 23, 1978: Julio Franco was signed by the Phillies as an amateur free agent.
- June 14, 1978: Bobby Brown and Jay Johnstone were traded by the Phillies to the New York Yankees for Rawly Eastwick.
- June 30, 1978: Carmen Castillo was signed by the Phillies as an amateur free agent.
- September 2, 1978: Dan Warthen was traded by the Phillies to the Houston Astros for Dan Larson.
- September 14, 1978: Horacio Piña was purchased by the Phillies from the Rieleros de Aguascalientes.

==== Draft picks ====
- June 6, 1978: 1978 Major League Baseball draft
  - Ed Hearn was drafted by the Phillies in the 4th round.
  - Ryne Sandberg was drafted by the Phillies in the 20th round. Player signed June 15, 1978.
  - Rick Leach was drafted by the Phillies in the 24th round, but did not sign.

=== Phillie Phanatic ===
The Phillie Phanatic debuted on April 25, 1978, at The Vet when the Phils played the Chicago Cubs. Tim McCarver introduced the Phanatic on the "Captain Noah and His Magical Ark" show on WPVI-TV in his role promoting the team. The Phanatic was originally portrayed by Dave Raymond.

=== Game log ===
1978 game log (Overall Record: 90–72)
April (10–7)

#	Date	Opponent	Score	Win	Loss	Save	Attendance	Record
1	April 7	Cardinals	1–5	Bob Forsch (1–0)	**Steve Carlton** (0–1)	None	47,791	0–1
2	April 8	Cardinals	7–0	**Larry Christenson** (1–0)	Eric Rasmussen (0–1)	None	24,441	1–1
3	April 9	Cardinals	12–3	**Randy Lerch** (1–0)	John Urrea (0–1)	None	35,104	2–1
–	April 11	Expos	Postponed (rain); Makeup: September 26 as a traditional double-header					
4	April 12	Expos	7–8	Steve Rogers (1–1)	**Jim Lonborg** (0–1)	Bill Atkinson (1)	19,110	2–2
5	April 14	@ Cardinals	4–3	**Steve Carlton** (1–1)	Pete Vuckovich (0–1)	**Tug McGraw** (1)	17,921	3–2
6	April 15	@ Cardinals	3–2 (10)	**Tug McGraw** (1–0)	Pete Vuckovich (0–2)	None	13,844	4–2
7	April 16	@ Cardinals	0–5	Bob Forsch (3–0)	**Randy Lerch** (1–1)	None	11,495	4–3
8	April 17	@ Pirates	6–2	**Jim Lonborg** (1–1)	John Candelaria (1–2)	None	7,343	5–3
–	April 18	@ Pirates	Postponed (rain); Makeup: August 4 as a traditional double-header					
–	April 21	@ Expos	Postponed (rain); Makeup: April 22 as a traditional double-header					
9	April 22 (1)	@ Expos	3–7	Wayne Twitchell (1–1)	**Steve Carlton** (1–2)	Stan Bahnsen (1)	see 2nd game	5–4
10	April 22 (2)	@ Expos	3–5	Ross Grimsley (3–0)	**Larry Christenson** (1–1)	Stan Bahnsen (2)	19,237	5–5
11	April 23	@ Expos	2–5	Steve Rogers (2–2)	**Jim Lonborg** (1–2)	Darold Knowles (1)	17,922	5–6
12	April 24	Cubs	12–2	**Randy Lerch** (2–1)	Woodie Fryman (0–1)	None	20,115	6–6
13	April 25	Cubs	7–0	**Jim Kaat** (1–0)	Dennis Lamp (1–3)	None	17,227	7–6
14	April 26	Cubs	2–4	Rick Reuschel (3–2)	**Steve Carlton** (1–3)	Bruce Sutter (3)	17,299	7–7
15	April 28	Padres	3–2	**Larry Christenson** (2–1)	Bob Owchinko (1–2)	**Ron Reed** (1)	26,872	8–7
16	April 29	Padres	7–2	**Jim Lonborg** (2–2)	Dave Freisleben (0–2)	None	28,390	9–7
17	April 30	Padres	11–4	**Randy Lerch** (3–1)	Randy Jones (1–2)	None	31,101	10–7

May (12–14)

#	Date	Opponent	Score	Win	Loss	Save	Attendance	Record
18	May 1	@ Reds	12–1	**Steve Carlton** (2–3)	Tom Seaver (0–3)	None	21,476	11–7
19	May 3	@ Reds	3–12	Fred Norman (4–0)	**Larry Christenson** (2–2)	None	26,054	11–8
20	May 5	Mets	9–4	**Jim Lonborg** (3–2)	Nino Espinosa (1–2)	**Tug McGraw** (2)	22,116	12–8
21	May 6	Mets	7–2	**Steve Carlton** (3–3)	Pat Zachry (3–1)	None	22,250	13–8
22	May 7	Mets	8–5	**Gene Garber** (1–0)	Craig Swan (1–2)	**Tug McGraw** (3)	39,106	14–8
–	May 8	Astros	Postponed (rain); Makeup: July 21 as a traditional double-header					
23	May 9	Astros	1–5	J. R. Richard (2–3)	**Larry Christenson** (2–3)	None	18,144	14–9
24	May 10	Astros	3–1	**Jim Lonborg** (4–2)	Mark Lemongello (2–4)	None	20,096	15–9
25	May 11	Reds	4–1	**Steve Carlton** (4–3)	Tom Seaver (1–4)	None	32,580	16–9
26	May 12	Reds	0–3	Bill Bonham (4–0)	**Randy Lerch** (3–2)	Paul Moskau (1)	38,179	16–10
27	May 13	Reds	3–4	Manny Sarmiento (3–1)	**Tug McGraw** (1–1)	None	35,802	16–11
28	May 14	Reds	7–4	**Larry Christenson** (3–3)	Tom Hume (2–5)	**Ron Reed** (2)	30,482	17–11
29	May 15	@ Astros	0–5	J. R. Richard (3–3)	**Jim Lonborg** (4–3)	None	9,943	17–12
30	May 16	@ Astros	1–6	Mark Lemongello (3–4)	**Steve Carlton** (4–4)	None	11,381	17–13
31	May 17	@ Astros	1–2	Joaquín Andújar (3–2)	**Randy Lerch** (3–3)	Tom Dixon (1)	11,856	17–14
32	May 18	@ Astros	8–5^{^{[a]}}	**Gene Garber** (2–0)	Joe Sambito (2–1)	None	10,828	18–14
33	May 19	@ Mets	3–4	Skip Lockwood (3–3)	**Tug McGraw** (1–2)	None	13,181	18–15
34	May 20	@ Mets	9–4 (11)	**Tug McGraw** (2–2)	Dale Murray (1–2)	None	14,110	19–15
35	May 21	@ Mets	5–6 (10)	Skip Lockwood (4–3)	**Tug McGraw** (2–3)	None	18,183	19–16
–	May 23	@ Cubs	Postponed (rain); Makeup: June 30 as a traditional double-header					
36	May 24	@ Cubs	4–6 (10)	Bruce Sutter (4–2)	**Gene Garber** (2–1)	None	17,901	19–17
37	May 25	@ Cubs	1–5	Rick Reuschel (5–3)	**Steve Carlton** (4–5)	Bruce Sutter (6)	19,788	19–18
38	May 26	@ Braves	2–4	Phil Niekro (5–6)	**Randy Lerch** (3–4)	None	16,638	19–19
39	May 27	@ Braves	6–5	**Tug McGraw** (3–3)	Rick Camp (0–2)	**Gene Garber** (1)	15,081	20–19
40	May 28	@ Braves	3–5	Preston Hanna (4–0)	**Larry Christenson** (3–4)	Jamie Easterly (1)	22,233	20–20
41	May 29	Pirates	4–3 (14)	**Warren Brusstar** (1–0)	Dave Hamilton (0–1)	None	34,353	21–20
42	May 30	Pirates	6–1	**Steve Carlton** (5–5)	Bert Blyleven (3–5)	None	26,123	22–20
43	May 31	Pirates	1–2	John Candelaria (5–6)	**Randy Lerch** (3–5)	Kent Tekulve (5)	29,595	22–21

June (18–10)

#	Date	Opponent	Score	Win	Loss	Save	Attendance	Record
44	June 2	Dodgers	4–2	**Jim Lonborg** (5–3)	Burt Hooton (4–5)	**Gene Garber** (2)	42,347	23–21
45	June 3	Dodgers	5–1	**Tug McGraw** (4–3)	Terry Forster (1–1)	None	31,442	24–21
46	June 4	Dodgers	9–4	**Jim Kaat** (2–0)	Tommy John (7–3)	None	42,066	25–21
47	June 5	Giants	4–3	**Steve Carlton** (6–5)	Vida Blue (6–4)	**Ron Reed** (3)	37,684	26–21
48	June 6	Giants	7–6	**Tug McGraw** (5–3)	Gary Lavelle (4–4)	None	28,093	27–21
49	June 7	Giants	5–4	**Tug McGraw** (6–3)	Randy Moffitt (5–2)	None	20,708	28–21
50	June 9	Braves	6–1	**Larry Christenson** (4–4)	Eddie Solomon (1–4)	None	40,272	29–21
51	June 10	Braves	6–2	**Jim Kaat** (3–0)	Dick Ruthven (2–6)	**Gene Garber** (3)	33,292	30–21
52	June 11	Braves	0–4	Phil Niekro (7–6)	**Steve Carlton** (6–6)	None	58,367	30–22
53	June 12	@ Dodgers	5–6	Burt Hooton (5–5)	**Jim Lonborg** (5–4)	Lance Rautzhan (1)	26,604	30–23
54	June 13	@ Dodgers	3–5	Don Sutton (5–6)	**Randy Lerch** (3–6)	None	41,257	30–24
55	June 14	@ Giants	1–2	Vida Blue (8–4)	**Larry Christenson** (4–5)	Randy Moffitt (4)	13,902	30–25
56	June 15	@ Giants	1–6	John Montefusco (6–2)	**Jim Kaat** (3–1)	None	14,754	30–26
57	June 16	@ Padres	5–0	**Steve Carlton** (7–6)	Randy Jones (5–5)	None	21,124	31–26
58	June 17	@ Padres	0–7	Bob Owchinko (4–6)	**Jim Lonborg** (5–5)	None	27,319	31–27
59	June 18	@ Padres	1–4	Gaylord Perry (7–2)	**Dick Ruthven** (2–7)	Rollie Fingers (15)	21,195	31–28
60	June 20	Cardinals	2–4	Bob Forsch (8–6)	**Larry Christenson** (4–6)	Mark Littell (2)	30,119	31–29
–	June 21	Cardinals	Postponed (rain); Makeup: September 8 as a traditional double-header					
61	June 22	Cardinals	2–1	**Steve Carlton** (8–6)	John Denny (6–6)	None	29,183	32–29
62	June 23 (1)	Cubs	6–1	**Dick Ruthven** (3–7)	Dave Roberts (3–2)	None	see 2nd game	33–29
63	June 23 (2)	Cubs	6–1	**Jim Lonborg** (6–5)	Dennis Lamp (2–8)	None	45,234	34–29
64	June 24	Cubs	6–2	**Jim Kaat** (4–1)	Ken Holtzman (1–2)	**Ron Reed** (4)	41,605	35–29
65	June 25	Cubs	4–2	**Larry Christenson** (5–6)	Rick Reuschel (8–5)	None	36,075	36–29
66	June 26	@ Expos	1–5	Steve Rogers (9–7)	**Steve Carlton** (8–7)	None	19,487	36–30
67	June 27	@ Expos	1–0	**Dick Ruthven** (4–7)	Hal Dues (1–4)	None	36,885	37–30
68	June 28	@ Expos	7–5	**Jim Lonborg** (7–5)	Mike Garman (0–3)	**Tug McGraw** (4)	35,182	38–30
69	June 29	@ Cubs	9–3	**Jim Kaat** (5–1)	Dave Roberts (3–3)	**Tug McGraw** (5)	25,669	39–30
70	June 30 (1)	@ Cubs	0–2	Mike Krukow (1–0)	**Larry Christenson** (5–7)	None	see 2nd game	39–31
71	June 30 (2)	@ Cubs	6–5	**Tug McGraw** (7–3)	Bruce Sutter (5–3)	None	29,525	40–31

July (15–14)

#	Date	Opponent	Score	Win	Loss	Save	Attendance	Record
72	July 1	@ Cubs	2–1	**Randy Lerch** (4–6)	Dennis Lamp (2–10)	**Ron Reed** (5)	26,042	41–31
73	July 2	@ Cubs	6–5	**Dick Ruthven** (5–7)	Ken Holtzman (1–3)	**Tug McGraw** (6)	25,934	42–31
–	July 3	@ Mets	Postponed (rain); Makeup: July 5					
74	July 4 (1)	@ Mets	0–4	Pat Zachry (10–3)	**Larry Christenson** (5–8)	None	see 2nd game	42–32
75	July 4 (2)	@ Mets	3–2	**Rawly Eastwick** (3–1)	Craig Swan (1–5)	**Ron Reed** (6)	10,410	43–32
76	July 5	@ Mets	7–5	**Warren Brusstar** (2–0)	Jerry Koosman (2–9)	**Tug McGraw** (7)	8,667	44–32
77	July 6	Expos	7–6	**Rawly Eastwick** (4–1)	Ross Grimsley (11–6)	None	50,149	45–32
78	July 7	Expos	4–7	Steve Rogers (11–7)	**Dick Ruthven** (5–8)	Mike Garman (6)	45,193	45–33
79	July 8 (1)	Expos	6–3	**Larry Christenson** (6–8)	Woodie Fryman (3–7)	**Ron Reed** (7)	see 2nd game	46–33
80	July 8 (2)	Expos	1–8	Hal Dues (3–4)	**Jim Lonborg** (7–6)	None	50,098	46–34
81	July 9	Expos	8–7	**Tug McGraw** (8–3)	Darold Knowles (2–2)	None	40,949	47–34
–	July 11	**1978 Major League Baseball All-Star Game** at San Diego Stadium in San Diego						
82	July 14	@ Braves	2–7	Phil Niekro (10–9)	**Steve Carlton** (8–8)	None	17,464	47–35
83	July 15	@ Braves	2–3	Rick Camp (2–2)	**Jim Kaat** (5–2)	Gene Garber (12)	N/A^{^{[b]}}	47–36
84	July 16	@ Braves	4–2	**Dick Ruthven** (6–8)	Preston Hanna (7–6)	**Ron Reed** (8)	20,734	48–36
85	July 17	@ Astros	1–2 (11)	Joe Niekro (6–7)	**Rawly Eastwick** (4–2)	None	14,397	48–37
86	July 18	@ Astros	1–9	J. R. Richard (9–9)	**Jim Lonborg** (7–7)	None	15,478	48–38
87	July 19	Reds	2–7	Dave Tomlin (6–1)	**Steve Carlton** (8–9)	Doug Bair (16)	45,608	48–39
88	July 20	Reds	8–6	**Warren Brusstar** (3–0)	Manny Sarmiento (7–6)	**Tug McGraw** (8)	44,054	49–39
89	July 21 (1)	Astros	6–1	**Dick Ruthven** (7–8)	Joe Niekro (6–8)	None	see 2nd game	50–39
90	July 21 (2)	Astros	8–2	**Larry Christenson** (7–8)	Rick Williams (1–2)	None	35,389	51–39
91	July 22	Astros	3–2 (10)	**Ron Reed** (1–0)	Ken Forsch (4–4)	None	33,672	52–39
92	July 23	Astros	13–2	**Steve Carlton** (9–9)	Tom Dixon (5–7)	None	30,554	53–39
93	July 24	Braves	1–5	Eddie Solomon (3–4)	**Jim Lonborg** (7–8)	Craig Skok (2)	30,184	53–40
94	July 25	Braves	0–4	Tommy Boggs (2–5)	**Larry Christenson** (7–9)	None	25,954	53–41
95	July 26	Braves	2–4	Phil Niekro (12–10)	**Jim Kaat** (5–3)	None	50,218	53–42
96	July 28 (1)	@ Reds	12–2	**Randy Lerch** (5–6)	Fred Norman (9–6)	None	see 2nd game	54–42
97	July 28 (2)	@ Reds	1–2	Tom Seaver (10–9)	**Steve Carlton** (9–10)	Doug Bair (18)	51,779	54–43
98	July 29	@ Reds	2–6	Paul Moskau (2–2)	**Jim Lonborg** (7–9)	None	49,108	54–44
99	July 30	@ Reds	3–5	Tom Hume (5–10)	**Larry Christenson** (7–10)	Doug Bair (19)	44,092	54–45
100	July 31	Mets	6–1	**Dick Ruthven** (8–8)	Nino Espinosa (9–9)	None	21,133	55–45

August (16–14)

#	Date	Opponent	Score	Win	Loss	Save	Attendance	Record
101	August 1	Mets	1–5	Kevin Kobel (2–2)	**Steve Carlton** (9–11)	None	31,085	55–46
102	August 2	Mets	8–6	**Randy Lerch** (6–6)	Jerry Koosman (3–12)	**Tug McGraw** (9)	32,382	56–46
103	August 4 (1)	@ Pirates	2–0	**Larry Christenson** (8–10)	Jim Rooker (6–8)	None	see 2nd game	57–46
104	August 4 (2)	@ Pirates	2–5	Don Robinson (6–5)	**Jim Kaat** (5–4)	None	30,865	57–47
–	August 5	@ Pirates	Postponed (rain); Makeup: September 29 as a traditional double-header					
105	August 6 (1)	@ Pirates	3–2	**Dick Ruthven** (9–8)	Bert Blyleven (9–7)	None	see 2nd game	58–47
106	August 6 (2)	@ Pirates	5–0	**Steve Carlton** (10–11)	Jim Bibby (6–6)	None	31,141	59–47
107	August 7	@ Cardinals	3–6	Aurelio López (1–1)	**Randy Lerch** (6–7)	Mark Littell (6)	18,671	59–48
108	August 8 (1)	@ Cardinals	0–2	Pete Vuckovich (9–9)	**Larry Christenson** (8–11)	None	see 2nd game	59–49
109	August 8 (2)	@ Cardinals	2–6	Tom Bruno (2–0)	**Jim Lonborg** (7–10)	None	26,880	59–50
110	August 9	@ Cardinals	6–3	**Jim Kaat** (6–4)	Bob Forsch (9–13)	**Ron Reed** (9)	16,172	60–50
111	August 10	Pirates	3–1	**Dick Ruthven** (10–8)	Bert Blyleven (9–8)	None	34,672	61–50
112	August 11	Pirates	15–4	**Steve Carlton** (11–11)	Bruce Kison (3–4)	None	35,101	62–50
113	August 12	Pirates	10–1	**Randy Lerch** (7–7)	Jim Bibby (6–7)	None	30,110	63–50
114	August 13	Pirates	3–7	Don Robinson (8–5)	**Larry Christenson** (8–12)	None	38,119	63–51
115	August 15	Dodgers	4–5	Doug Rau (12–7)	**Dick Ruthven** (10–9)	Lance Rautzhan (4)	38,386	63–52
116	August 16	Dodgers	2–5	Bob Welch (5–0)	**Jim Kaat** (6–5)	None	37,660	63–53
117	August 17	Dodgers	2–5	Burt Hooton (13–8)	**Tug McGraw** (8–4)	Terry Forster (15)	36,325	63–54
118	August 18	Giants	5–6	Gary Lavelle (10–9)	**Tug McGraw** (8–5)	None	36,554	63–55
119	August 19	Giants	3–0	**Steve Carlton** (12–11)	John Montefusco (9–5)	None	54,288	64–55
120	August 20	Giants	5–3	**Dick Ruthven** (11–9)	Jim Barr (6–10)	**Ron Reed** (10)	51,088	65–55
121	August 21	Padres	3–7	Gaylord Perry (15–5)	**Warren Brusstar** (3–1)	Bob Shirley (4)	27,124	65–56
122	August 22	Padres	5–3	**Larry Christenson** (9–12)	Eric Rasmussen (12–10)	**Ron Reed** (11)	36,339	66–56
123	August 23	Padres	5–6	Rollie Fingers (5–11)	**Ron Reed** (1–1)	None	31,032	66–57
124	August 24	@ Dodgers	4–5	Tommy John (15–9)	**Warren Brusstar** (3–2)	Charlie Hough (7)	49,064	66–58
125	August 25	@ Dodgers	5–6	Lance Rautzhan (2–0)	**Ron Reed** (1–2)	None	46,548	66–59
126	August 26	@ Dodgers	3–1	**Randy Lerch** (8–7)	Doug Rau (12–8)	None	50,194	67–59
127	August 27	@ Dodgers	9–3	**Larry Christenson** (10–12)	Bob Welch (5–2)	None	43,065	68–59
128	August 28	@ Padres	6–1	**Jim Kaat** (7–5)	Randy Jones (11–12)	None	33,768	69–59
129	August 29	@ Padres	9–5	**Dick Ruthven** (12–9)	Bob Owchinko (8–11)	None	13,568	70–59
130	August 30	@ Padres	6–5	**Warren Brusstar** (4–2)	Rollie Fingers (5–12)	None	15,941	71–59

September (19–12)

#	Date	Opponent	Score	Win	Loss	Save	Attendance	Record
131	September 1	@ Giants	3–4	Gary Lavelle (11–9)	**Steve Carlton** (12–12)	None	16,413	71–60
132	September 2	@ Giants	3–1 (10)	**Larry Christenson** (11–12)	Gary Lavelle (11–10)	None	27,457	72–60
133	September 3 (1)	@ Giants	1–4	Bob Knepper (15–9)	**Dick Ruthven** (12–10)	None	see 2nd game	72–61
134	September 3 (2)	@ Giants	2–3	John Montefusco (10–6)	**Warren Brusstar** (4–3)	John Curtis (1)	39,596	72–62
135	September 4 (1)	@ Cardinals	2–3	Bob Forsch (11–15)	**Randy Lerch** (8–8)	Mark Littell (9)	see 2nd game	72–63
136	September 4 (2)	@ Cardinals	10–2	**Jim Lonborg** (8–10)	Silvio Martínez (8–8)	None	19,015	73–63
137	September 6	@ Cubs	8–1	**Steve Carlton** (13–12)	Rick Reuschel (13–12)	None	14,269	74–63
138	September 7	@ Cubs	5–3	**Warren Brusstar** (5–3)	Donnie Moore (9–7)	**Ron Reed** (12)	11,427	75–63
139	September 8 (1)	Cardinals	1–0	**Dick Ruthven** (13–10)	Tom Bruno (4–2)	None	see 2nd game	76–63
140	September 8 (2)	Cardinals	2–1	**Ron Reed** (2–2)	Dan O'Brien (0–1)	None	35,160	77–63
141	September 9	Cardinals	6–3	**Randy Lerch** (9–8)	Bob Forsch (11–16)	None	35,824	78–63
142	September 10	Cardinals	6–8 (10)	Mark Littell (2–8)	**Ron Reed** (2–3)	Buddy Schultz (6)	33,106	78–64
143	September 11	Pirates	10–3	**Steve Carlton** (14–12)	Don Robinson (12–6)	None	33,198	79–64
144	September 12	Pirates	1–5	John Candelaria (11–11)	**Larry Christenson** (11–13)	Kent Tekulve (29)	31,355	79–65
145	September 13	Cubs	6–2	**Dick Ruthven** (14–10)	Ray Burris (5–12)	None	30,114	80–65
146	September 14	Cubs	11–5	**Warren Brusstar** (6–3)	Rick Reuschel (14–13)	**Ron Reed** (13)	20,037	81–65
147	September 15	Mets	4–5 (10)	Dale Murray (9–5)	**Tug McGraw** (8–6)	None	29,257	81–66
148	September 16	Mets	2–1 (10)	**Steve Carlton** (15–12)	Dwight Bernard (1–2)	None	44,307	82–66
149	September 17	Mets	0–2	Mike Bruhert (4–9)	**Larry Christenson** (11–14)	None	35,301	82–67
150	September 19	@ Expos	2–5	Scott Sanderson (3–2)	**Dick Ruthven** (14–11)	Mike Garman (13)	9,429	82–68
151	September 20	@ Expos	4–2	**Randy Lerch** (10–8)	Dan Schatzeder (7–6)	**Ron Reed** (14)	9,298	83–68
–	September 21	@ Expos	Postponed (rain); Makeup: September 25 in Philadelphia					
–	September 22	@ Mets	Postponed (rain); Makeup: September 23 as a traditional double-header					
152	September 23 (1)	@ Mets	1–0	**Larry Christenson** (12–14)	Mike Bruhert (4–10)	None	see 2nd game	84–68
153	September 23 (2)	@ Mets	6–3	**Dick Ruthven** (15–11)	Dwight Bernard (1–3)	None	9,694	85–68
154	September 24	@ Mets	8–2	**Steve Carlton** (16–12)	Nino Espinosa (10–15)	None	25,473	86–68
155	September 25	Expos	3–2 (12)	**Ron Reed** (3–3)	Stan Bahnsen (1–5)	None	11,651	87–68
156	September 26 (1)	Expos	5–3	**Jim Kaat** (8–5)	David Palmer (0–1)	**Ron Reed** (15)	see 2nd game	88–68
157	September 26 (2)	Expos	0–3	Rudy May (8–10)	**Tug McGraw** (8–7)	None	29,506	88–69
158	September 27	Expos	5–4	**Larry Christenson** (13–14)	Ross Grimsley (19–11)	**Ron Reed** (16)	27,410	89–69
159	September 29 (1)	@ Pirates	4–5	Kent Tekulve (7–7)	**Ron Reed** (3–4)	None	see 2nd game	89–70
160	September 29 (2)	@ Pirates	1–2	Kent Tekulve (8–7)	**Steve Carlton** (16–13)	None	45,134	89–71
161	September 30	@ Pirates	10–8	**Randy Lerch** (11–8)	Grant Jackson (7–5)	**Ron Reed** (17)	28,905	90–71

October (0–1)

#	Date	Opponent	Score	Win	Loss	Save	Attendance	Record
162	October 1	@ Pirates	3–5	Odell Jones (2–0)	**Kevin Saucier** (0–1)	Kent Tekulve (31)	30,224	90–72

^{^[a]}The May 18, 1978, game was protested by the Phillies in the top of the seventh inning. The protest was later denied.
^{^[b]}The attendance for the July 15, 1978, game at Atlanta was not available on the baseball-reference.com website and was omitted from Associated Press box scores.

- Phillies win
- Phillies loss
- Postponement
- Bold: Phillies team member

=== Roster ===
1978 Philadelphia Phillies
**Roster**
**Pitchers**: 46 Dan Boitano; 40 Warren Brusstar; 32 Steve Carlton; 38 Larry Christenson; 49 Rawly Eastwick; 26 Gene Garber; 39 Jim Kaat; 48 Dan Larson; 47 Randy Lerch; 41 Jim Lonborg; 45 Tug McGraw; 35 Horacio Piña; 42 Ron Reed; 44 Dick Ruthven; 33 Kevin Saucier	**Catchers**: 8 Bob Boone; 9 Barry Foote; 11 Tim McCarver; 34 Keith Moreland; **Infielders**: 10 Larry Bowa; 1 José Cardenal; 48,16 Todd Cruz; 14 Bud Harrelson; 18 Richie Hebner; 15 Davey Johnson; 21 Jay Johnstone; 24 Pete Mackanin; 16 Jim Morrison; 20 Mike Schmidt; 6 Ted Sizemore	**Outfielders**: 26 Kerry Dineen; 17 Orlando González; 19 Greg Luzinski; 31 Garry Maddox; 25 Jerry Martin; 22,21 Bake McBride; 27 Lonnie Smith	**Manager**: 3 Danny Ozark; **Coaches**: 5 Carroll Beringer; 2 Billy DeMars; 4 Ray Rippelmeyer (Pitching); 12 Tony Taylor (Hitting); 7 Bobby Wine

== Player stats ==
= Indicates team leader

=== Batting ===
==== Starters by position ====
Note: Pos = Position; G = Games played; AB = At bats; H = Hits; Avg. = Batting average; HR = Home runs; RBI = Runs batted in

Pos	Player	G	AB	H	Avg.	HR	RBI
C	Bob Boone	132	435	123	.283	12	62
1B	Richie Hebner	137	435	123	.283	17	71
2B	Ted Sizemore	108	351	77	.219	0	25
3B	Mike Schmidt	145	513	129	.251	21	78
SS	Larry Bowa	156	654	192	.294	3	43
LF	Greg Luzinski	155	540	143	.265	35	101
CF	Garry Maddox	155	598	172	.288	11	68
RF	Bake McBride	122	472	127	.269	10	49

==== Other batters ====
Note: G = Games played; AB = At bats; H = Hits; Avg. = Batting average; HR = Home runs; RBI = Runs batted in

Player	G	AB	H	Avg.	HR	RBI
Jerry Martin	128	266	72	.271	9	36
José Cardenal	87	201	50	.249	4	33
Tim McCarver	90	146	36	.247	1	14
Jim Morrison	53	108	17	.157	3	10
Bud Harrelson	71	103	22	.214	0	9
Davey Johnson	44	89	17	.191	2	14
Barry Foote	39	57	9	.158	1	4
Jay Johnstone	35	56	10	.179	0	4
Orlando González	26	26	5	.192	0	0
Kerry Dineen	5	8	2	.250	0	0
Pete Mackanin	5	8	2	.250	0	1
Lonnie Smith	17	4	0	.000	0	0
Todd Cruz	3	4	2	.500	0	2
Keith Moreland	1	2	0	.000	0	0

=== Pitching ===
==== Starting pitchers ====
Note: G = Games pitched; IP = Innings pitched; W = Wins; L = Losses; ERA = Earned run average; SO = Strikeouts

Player	G	IP	W	L	ERA	SO
Steve Carlton	34	247.1	16	13	2.84	161
Larry Christenson	33	228.0	13	14	3.24	131
Randy Lerch	33	184.0	11	8	3.96	96
Dick Ruthven	20	150.2	13	5	2.99	75
Jim Kaat	26	140.1	8	5	4.10	48
Jim Lonborg	22	113.2	8	10	5.23	48

==== Relief pitchers ====
Note: G = Games pitched; W = Wins; L = Losses; SV = Saves; ERA = Earned run average; SO = Strikeouts

Player	G	W	L	SV	ERA	SO
Ron Reed	66	3	4	17	2.24	85
Warren Brusstar	58	6	3	0	2.33	60
Tug McGraw	55	8	7	9	3.21	63
Rawly Eastwick	22	2	1	0	4.02	14
Gene Garber	22	2	1	3	1.40	24
Horacio Piña	2	0	0	0	0.00	4
Dan Boitano	1	0	0	0	0.00	0
Dan Larson	1	0	0	0	9.00	2
Kevin Saucier	1	0	1	0	18.00	2

== 1978 National League Championship Series ==
The Los Angeles Dodgers win the Series, 3 games to 1, over the Phillies.

Game	Score	Date	Location	Attendance
1	**Los Angeles** – 9, Philadelphia – 5	October 4	Veterans Stadium	63,460
2	**Los Angeles** – 4, Philadelphia – 0	October 5	Veterans Stadium	60,642
3	**Philadelphia** – 9, Los Angeles – 4	October 6	Dodger Stadium	55,043
4	Philadelphia – 3, **Los Angeles** – 4	October 7	Dodger Stadium	55,124

=== Postseason game log ===
1978 Postseason game log (Overall Record: 1–3)
National League Championship Series (1–3)

#	Date	Opponent	Score	Win	Loss	Save	Attendance	Record
1	October 4	Dodgers	5–9	Bob Welch (1–0)	**Larry Christenson** (0–1)	None	63,460	0–1
2	October 5	Dodgers	0–4	Tommy John (1–0)	**Dick Ruthven** (0–1)	None	60,642	0–2
3	October 6	@ Dodgers	9–4	**Steve Carlton** (1–0)	Don Sutton (0–1)	None	55,043	1–2
4	October 7	@ Dodgers	3–4 (10)	Terry Forster (1–0)	**Tug McGraw** (0–1)	None	55,124	1–3

- Phillies win
- Phillies loss
- Postponement
- Bold: Phillies team member

== Awards and honors ==
- Greg Luzinski, Roberto Clemente Award

== Farm system ==
Level	Team	League	Manager
AAA	Oklahoma City 89ers	American Association	Mike Ryan
AA	Reading Phillies	Eastern League	Lee Elia
A	Peninsula Pilots	Carolina League	Jim Snyder
A	Spartanburg Phillies	Western Carolinas League	Ron Clark
Rookie	Helena Phillies	Pioneer League	Larry Rojas
