= Mardie =

Mardie may refer to:

- Mardie Station, in the Pilbara region of Western Australia;
- Mardié, in the Loiret department in north-central France;
- Mardie Cornejo, born 1951, an American baseball player
