= Bob Myrick =

American baseball player (1952–2012)

- Pitcher
- Born: October 1, 1952; Hattiesburg, Mississippi, U.S.
- Died: August 23, 2012 (aged 59); Hattiesburg, Mississippi, U.S.
- Batted: Right Threw: Left

MLB debut
- May 28, 1976, for the New York Mets

Last MLB appearance
- May 18, 1978, for the New York Mets

MLB statistics
- Win–loss record: 3–6
- Earned run average: 3.48
- Strikeouts: 73
- Stats at Baseball Reference

Teams
- New York Mets (1976–1978)

Robert Howard Myrick (October 1, 1952 – August 23, 2012) was an American relief pitcher in Major League Baseball. He was the great-nephew of longtime Washington Senators second baseman Buddy Myer.

== Early years ==
Myrick was a star athlete at Blair Center Hattiesburg High School in Hattiesburg, Mississippi, and was drafted by the Baltimore Orioles in the 29th round of the 1970 Major League Baseball draft. He also received scholarship offers in baseball, basketball & football, and decided to take Mississippi State University up on their baseball scholarship. After four years at MSU, he was selected by the New York Mets in the twentieth round of the 1974 Major League Baseball draft.

Myrick made his professional debut with the Batavia Trojans of the NY-Penn League, earning his first victory on Monday August 14, 1974 pitching 6 1/3 no-hit baseball before giving up a home run against the Niagara Falls Pirates.

== New York Mets ==
He went 15–9 with a 3.45 earned run average in two plus minor league seasons before making his major league debut on May 28, 1976. He threw just one pitch to the St. Louis Cardinals' Héctor Cruz, inducing a ground ball to shortstop to end the fifth inning. After which, he was taken out for pinch hitter Bruce Boisclair. He appeared in all three games of the series with the Cardinals at Shea Stadium, facing four batters without allowing a hit. He walked one batter, however, promptly erased him on a double play the next batter. He made eleven appearances, all in losses until facing the Philadelphia Phillies on July 27. Entering the game with the Mets trailing 1–0 in the fourth inning, Myrick stepped up to the plate for his first career at bat in the fifth inning. Phillies pitcher Tom Underwood uncorked a wild pitch, bringing Roy Staiger home with the tying run. Then, Myrick grounded out to third baseman Mike Schmidt, bringing Bud Harrelson home with the go-ahead run of his first career win. He went 1–0 with a 2.96 ERA in twenty relief appearances. His only loss came in his only start against the Montreal Expos on September 28.

Myrick unquestionably pitched better in relief than he did as a starter. In 1977, Myrick was 2–1 with a 2.75 ERA & two saves as a reliever. In four starts, he was 0–1 with a 7.63 ERA. In his final start of the season against the Atlanta Braves on September 4, Myrick allowed four runs in the first inning without retiring a batter before being removed from the game.

Despite a stellar 2.28 ERA, Myrick was 0-3 through fifteen appearances in 1978. Two consecutive poor appearances raised his ERA to 3.28, and got him demoted to triple A by the middle of May. He went 4–8 with a 3.83 ERA with the Tidewater Tides over the remainder of the season.

== Retirement ==
On June 15, 1979, Myrick and Mike Bruhert were dealt to the Texas Rangers for Dock Ellis. Myrick went 3–4 with a 4.93 for the triple A Tucson Toros, and was released at the end of the season. He briefly rejoined the Mets in 1980, but was dealt to the Chicago Cubs for minor leaguer Todd Winterfeldt after just two appearances at Tidewater. He went 6–2 with a 2.84 ERA & five saves for the Cubs' triple A affiliate, the Wichita Aeros, in 1980. He was one of five left handers competing for a spot in Joe Amalfitano's bullpen in 1981. He failed to make the club, and was released after twelve appearances with the American Association's Iowa Oaks, in which he compiled a 12.75 ERA.

Shortly afterwards, Myrick returned to Economy Supply, the building supply business his grandfather founded in 1941 that he had been working part-time with since he was thirteen. He eventually became co-owner with his brother Mike and cousins Lewis & Lance Myrick. Myrick died after suffering a heart attack at the age of 59. He is survived by his wife, Debi, and four sons, Adam, Joel, Daniel & Benjamin.
