= Sergio Ferrer =

Puerto Rican baseball player

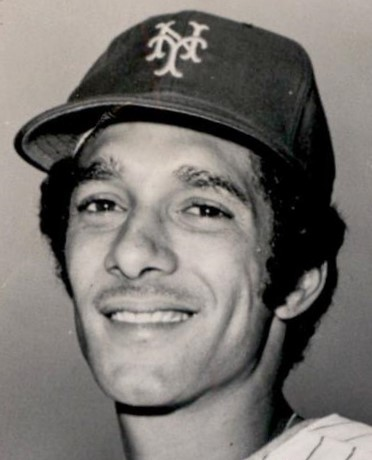
- Shortstop
- Born: January 29, 1951 (age 75); Santurce, Puerto Rico
- Batted: Switch Threw: Right

MLB debut
- April 5, 1974, for the Minnesota Twins

Last MLB appearance
- September 28, 1979, for the New York Mets

MLB statistics
- Batting average: .242
- At-bats: 178
- Runs batted in: 3
- Stats at Baseball Reference

Teams
- Minnesota Twins (1974–1975); New York Mets (1978–1979)

Sergio Ferrer Marrero (born January 29, 1951) is a Puerto Rican former Major League Baseball (MLB) shortstop.

== Minnesota Twins ==
Ferrer was born in Santurce, Puerto Rico, and signed with the Los Angeles Dodgers at nineteen years old. After three seasons in their farm system, in which he batted .280 with nine home runs and 121 runs batted in, he was selected by the Minnesota Twins from the Albuquerque Dukes in the Rule 5 draft on December 3, 1973.

Ferrer made the Twins out of Spring training 1974, and immediately made an impact on his new club. In the season opener, he went two-for-five with two runs scored. The second came in the eleventh inning, when the speedy Ferrer scored from second base on a deep sacrifice fly to centerfield by Larry Hisle. He spent the first two months of the season as the Twins' starting shortstop, batting a respectable .281 and scoring twelve runs in the lead-off spot of the Twins' batting order, however, his inconsistent fielding led Twins manager Frank Quilici to give the starting shortstop job back to incumbent Danny Thompson. He was optioned to the triple A Tacoma Twins in late May, but his glove showed no improvement, and he remained in the minors for the rest of the season.

Ferrer again started the season in the majors in 1975. He got most of his playing time early in the season backing up Hall of Famer Rod Carew at second, but the switch hitter was soon moved into a platoon with Thompson at short. It proved effective, as Ferrer batted .333 against right-handed pitchers. Regardless, he was optioned back to Tacoma at the start of June much to the dismay of Carew, who openly expressed his unhappiness with this decision. After the season, he was traded to the Philadelphia Phillies for catcher Larry Cox.

== New York Mets ==
With All-Stars Larry Bowa and Dave Cash in the Phillies' middle infield, Ferrer was unable to crack the major league roster, and spent the 1976 season in triple A. Following Cash's departure via free agency, Ferrer went into Spring training 1977 battling Ted Sizemore for the job at second base. When Sizemore won the job, Ferrer was dealt to the New York Yankees for outfielder Kerry Dineen. After one season with the triple A Syracuse Chiefs, he went cross-town to the New York Mets in exchange for third baseman Roy Staiger at the Winter Meetings on December 9, 1977.

When starting shortstop Tim Foli tore the outer ligament on his left knee early in the 1978 season, Ferrer saw his first major league action in nearly three years. Unfortunately for Ferrer, Mets manager Joe Torre opted to shift second baseman Doug Flynn to short, and added Bobby Valentine to his starting line-up at second rather than giving playing time to Ferrer. He appeared in 37 games for the Mets, mostly as a pinch runner or late inning defensive replacement. Once Foli returned from the disabled list, Ferrer was optioned back to triple A Tidewater. He returned to the club in late July, but his role didn't change much. His stint with the Mets in 1979 proved even less eventful; he appeared in 32 games and logged just nine plate appearances.

== Liga Mexicana de Béisbol ==
Midway through the 1980 season, Ferrer was released by the Mets. He briefly played minor league ball with the Cincinnati Reds before heading to Mexico to play in the Mexican League, where he played through 1982. In 1989, he played for the St. Petersburg Pelicans and St. Lucie Legends in the Senior Professional Baseball Association.
