= Butch Benton =

American baseball player (born 1957)

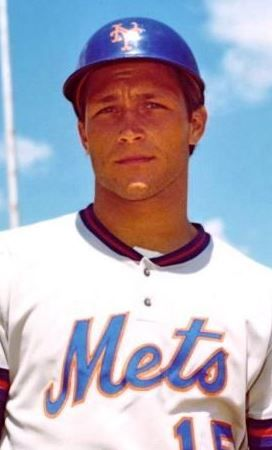
- Catcher
- Born: August 24, 1957 (age 68); Tampa, Florida, U.S.
- Batted: Right Threw: Right

MLB debut
- September 14, 1978, for the New York Mets

Last MLB appearance
- June 15, 1985, for the Cleveland Indians

MLB statistics
- Batting average: .162
- Home runs: 0
- Runs batted in: 10
- Stats at Baseball Reference

Teams
- New York Mets (1978, 1980); Chicago Cubs (1982); Cleveland Indians (1985)

Alfred Lee "Butch" Benton (born August 24, 1957) is an American former Major League Baseball right-handed catcher. He was selected sixth overall in the 1975 Major League Baseball draft by the New York Mets.

== Early years ==
Benton played both football and baseball at Godby High School in Tallahassee, Florida. He declined a football scholarship to the University of Florida when the Mets drafted him in the first round of the 1975 amateur draft. After four seasons in their farm system, in which he batted .275 with 22 home runs and 189 runs batted in, he made the jump from double A to the major leagues at age 21 in 1978 when he joined the Mets as a September call-up.

== New York Mets ==
He made his major league debut on September 14, pinch-hitting for Roy Lee Jackson. Facing the Montreal Expos' Dan Schatzeder, Benton flew out to center field. He did not break into the lineup again until September 29 at Wrigley Field, when he was hit by a Mike Krukow pitch as a pinch hitter. Benton scored his only run as a Met pinch running for Ed Kranepool the next day.

On October 1, the last day of the season, Benton saw his first opportunity to play in the field. Again facing the Chicago Cubs at Wrigley, his first major league hit was a single off Lynn McGlothen that drove in a run. He also singled off Dave Geisel in the ninth, driving in the fifth run of the Mets' 5–3 victory. Benton was the sixth-youngest player to appear in the National League in 1978.

Benton spent the entirety of the 1979 season with the Mets' triple A affiliate in Tidewater and fared poorly, hitting only .198 with three home runs and 25 runs batted in. As the fourth catcher in the Mets' depth chart, he was called up midway through the 1980 season when both John Stearns and Ron Hodges were sidelined with injuries. Batting .263 at the time of his promotion, Benton managed just one hit in 21 at bats as Alex Trevino's backup over the remainder of the season in the major leagues.

== Chicago Cubs ==
Before the 1981 season, the Mets traded him to the Cubs for future considerations. He again spent the balance of the season in the minors, hitting just .202 for the triple A Iowa Cubs. The best season of Benton's minor league career came in 1982, when he batted .330 with eleven home runs and 57 runs batted in for Iowa. He was called up to the majors that September, and managed one hit in seven at bats over four games; the one hit coming against the Mets.

== Cleveland Indians ==
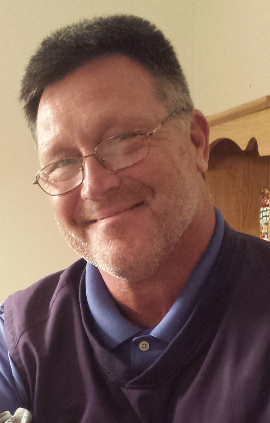
Benton in 2015

Benton spent the next few seasons as a minor league journeyman. Before the 1983 season, the Cubs traded him to the Montreal Expos for infielder Jerry Manuel. Neither player saw any major league experience with his next franchise. Benton's .298 batting average and nine home runs for Montreal's triple A affiliate, the Wichita Aeros, earned him a minor league deal and an invitation to spring training from the Philadelphia Phillies. However, he failed to make the club, and was released. Shortly afterwards, he signed with the Detroit Tigers, and spent the 1984 season catching for their triple A team in Evansville.

He then signed with the Cleveland Indians organization, who decided to go into the 1985 season with three catchers (Benton, Jerry Willard and Chris Bando). On April 27, about six and a half years after his major league debut, Benton garnered his first extra-base hit, a double that drove in a run off Scott McGregor. Later in the same inning, Benton got a single and a second run batted in off Tippy Martinez. For the month, Benton batted .250 with three runs batted in. Meanwhile, Willard and Bando combined to go 5-for-50 with two runs batted in during April. With Willard out for the entire month of May with an injury, Benton saw his first real opportunity to earn a starting job. However, after going 2-for-3 with a run batted in against the Texas Rangers on May 4, Benton went 5-for-40 over the rest of the month. Shortly after Willard returned, Benton was demoted to triple A, where he remained for the duration of the season. The Indians released him in February 1986.

== Career statistics ==
Games	PA	AB	Runs	Hits	2B	3B	HR	RBI	BB	SO	HBP	Avg.	Slg.	Fld%	CS%
51	109	99	6	16	4	0	0	10	5	14	2	.162	.202	.959	28%

Benton played for the St. Petersburg Pelicans of the Senior Professional Baseball Association in 1990. His team won the championship in the league's only full year of existence, which may have prompted Benton's attempted comeback in 1991 at age 33 with the Toledo Mud Hens. He batted just .133 in nine games with the Tigers affiliate, and was subsequently released, and retired from baseball.

== Personal life ==
Benton's wife is the former Linn Abshier. They married in 1996, and reside in Ocala, Florida. They have nine children and many grandchildren.

Benton was a member of the PGA from 2007 to 2015, and worked as a general manager at a Golf Club in Central Florida. He is a member of the Major League Baseball Players Alumni Association and attends charity events along with other retired major league players.
