= National League East =

Division of Major League Baseball

- League: National League
- Sport: Major League Baseball
- Founded: 1969
- No. of teams: 5
- Most recent champions: Atlanta Braves (2026; 19th title)
- Most titles: Atlanta Braves (19)

National League East Teams Location

The National League East is one of Major League Baseball's six divisions. Along with the American League Central and National League Central, it is one of three divisions to have every current member team win at least one World Series title; it is also the only division whose current members have all won the championship while playing there.

After having internal, informal divisions for scheduling purposes during the pre-expansion era, the division was formally created when the National League (NL) (along with the American League) added two expansion teams and divided into two divisions, East and West, effective for the 1969 season. The National League's geographical alignment was rather peculiar as its geographic partitioning was less east–west than north–south. Two teams in the Eastern Time Zone, the Atlanta Braves and the Cincinnati Reds, were in the same division as teams on the Pacific coast. This was due to the demands of the Chicago Cubs and St. Louis Cardinals, who refused to support expansion unless they were promised they would be kept together in the newly created East Division.

During the two-division era, from 1969 to 1993, the Philadelphia Phillies and the Pittsburgh Pirates together owned more than half of the division titles, having won a combined 15 of 25 championships during that span. They were also the only teams in the division to have won consecutive titles during that span.

When the National League realigned into three divisions in 1994, the Pittsburgh Pirates were originally supposed to stay in the East while the Braves were to be moved to the newly created National League Central. However, the Braves, wanting to form a natural rivalry with the expansion Florida Marlins, elected to be placed in the East. Despite the Marlins offering to go to the Central, the Pirates instead gave up their spot in the East to the Braves. Since then, the Pirates have tried several times unsuccessfully to be placed back in the East.

== Division membership ==
=== Current members ===
- Atlanta Braves – Joined in 1994; formerly of the NL West
- Miami Marlins – Joined in 1993 as an expansion team (originally as the Florida Marlins)
- New York Mets – Founding member
- Philadelphia Phillies – Founding member
- Washington Nationals – Founding member (originally as the Montreal Expos in 1969)

=== Former members ===
- Chicago Cubs – Founding member, moved to the NL Central in 1994.
- Pittsburgh Pirates – Founding member, moved to the NL Central in 1994.
- St. Louis Cardinals – Founding member, moved to the NL Central in 1994.

=== Membership timeline ===
Place cursor over year for division champ or World Series team.

NL East Division^{[A]}
Years
69	70	71	72	73	74	75	76	77	78	79	80	81	82	83	84	85	86	87	88	89	90	91	92	93	94	95	96	97	98
Chicago Cubs^{[C]}																													
Montreal Expos
New York Mets
Philadelphia Phillies
Pittsburgh Pirates^{[C]}																													
St. Louis Cardinals^{[C]}																													
																								Florida Marlins^{[B]}					
																									Atlanta Braves^{[C]}				
NL East Division^{[A]}
Years
99	00	01	02	03	04	05	06	07	08	09	10	11	12	13	14	15	16	17	18	19	20	21	22	23	24	25	26	27	
Montreal Expos						Washington Nationals^{[D]}																							
New York Mets
Philadelphia Phillies
Florida Marlins													Miami Marlins^{[E]}																
Atlanta Braves
Team not in division Division Won World Series Division Won NL Championship

^{A} The creation of the division with the expansion of the league – with the Expos added.
^{B} Florida Marlins added in the 1993 expansion
^{C} The Atlanta Braves moved in from the NL West, and the Chicago Cubs, Pittsburgh Pirates, and St. Louis Cardinals moved into newly created National League Central
^{D} The Montreal Expos relocated to Washington, D.C., becoming the Washington Nationals
^{E} The Florida Marlins relocated from Miami Gardens, Florida to Miami and changed their name to the Miami Marlins

== Champions by year ==
- Team names link to the season in which each team played

Year	Winner	Record	%	Playoff Results
1969	New York Mets (1)	100–62	.617	Won NLCS (Braves) 3–0; Won World Series (Orioles) 4–1
1970	Pittsburgh Pirates (1)	89–73	.549	Lost NLCS (Reds) 3–0
1971	Pittsburgh Pirates (2)	97–65	.599	Won NLCS (Giants) 3–1; Won World Series (Orioles) 4–3
1972	Pittsburgh Pirates (3)	96–59	.619	Lost NLCS (Reds) 3–2
1973	New York Mets (2)	82–79	.509	Won NLCS (Reds) 3–2; Lost World Series (Athletics) 4–3
1974	Pittsburgh Pirates (4)	88–74	.543	Lost NLCS (Dodgers) 3–1
1975	Pittsburgh Pirates (5)	92–69	.571	Lost NLCS (Reds) 3–0
1976	Philadelphia Phillies (1)	101–61	.623	Lost NLCS (Reds) 3–0
1977	Philadelphia Phillies (2)	101–61	.623	Lost NLCS (Dodgers) 3–1
1978	Philadelphia Phillies (3)	90–72	.556	Lost NLCS (Dodgers) 3–1
1979	Pittsburgh Pirates (6)	98–64	.605	Won NLCS (Reds) 3–0; Won World Series (Orioles) 4–3
1980	Philadelphia Phillies (4)	91–71	.562	Won NLCS (Astros) 3–2; Won World Series (Royals) 4–2
1981	Montreal Expos (1)†	60–48	.556	Won NLDS (Phillies) 3–2; Lost NLCS (Dodgers) 3–2
1982	St. Louis Cardinals (1)	92–70	.570	Won NLCS (Braves) 3–0; Won World Series (Brewers) 4–3
1983	Philadelphia Phillies (5)	90–72	.556	Won NLCS (Dodgers) 3–1; Lost World Series (Orioles) 4–1
1984	Chicago Cubs (1)	96–65	.596	Lost NLCS (Padres) 3–2
1985	St. Louis Cardinals (2)	101–61	.623	Won NLCS (Dodgers) 4–2; Lost World Series (Royals) 4–3
1986	New York Mets (3)	108–54	.667	Won NLCS (Astros) 4–2; Won World Series (Red Sox) 4–3
1987	St. Louis Cardinals (3)	95–67	.586	Won NLCS (Giants) 4–3; Lost World Series (Twins) 4–3
1988	New York Mets (4)	100–60	.625	Lost NLCS (Dodgers) 4–3
1989	Chicago Cubs (2)	93–69	.574	Lost NLCS (Giants) 4–1
1990	Pittsburgh Pirates (7)	95–67	.586	Lost NLCS (Reds) 4–2
1991	Pittsburgh Pirates (8)	98–64	.605	Lost NLCS (Braves) 4–3
1992	Pittsburgh Pirates (9)	96–66	.593	Lost NLCS (Braves) 4–3
1993	Philadelphia Phillies (6)	97–65	.599	Won NLCS (Braves) 4–2; Lost World Series (Blue Jays) 4–2
1994§	No playoffs due to 1994–95 Major League Baseball strike			
1995	Atlanta Braves (1)	90–54	.625	Won NLDS (Rockies) 3–1; Won NLCS (Reds) 4–0; Won World Series (Indians) 4–2
1996	Atlanta Braves (2)	96–66	.593	Won NLDS (Dodgers) 3–0; Won NLCS (Cardinals) 4–3; Lost World Series (Yankees) 4–2
1997	Atlanta Braves (3)	101–61	.623	Won NLDS (Astros) 3–0; Lost NLCS (Marlins) 4–2
1998	Atlanta Braves (4)	106–56	.654	Won NLDS (Cubs) 3–0; Lost NLCS (Padres) 4–2
1999	Atlanta Braves (5)	103–59	.636	Won NLDS (Astros) 3–1; Won NLCS (Mets) 4–2; Lost World Series (Yankees) 4–0
2000	Atlanta Braves (6)	95–67	.586	Lost NLDS (Cardinals) 3–0
2001	Atlanta Braves (7)	88–74	.543	Won NLDS (Astros) 3–0; Lost NLCS (Diamondbacks) 4–1
2002	Atlanta Braves (8)	101–59	.631	Lost NLDS (Giants) 3–2
2003	Atlanta Braves (9)	101–61	.623	Lost NLDS (Cubs) 3–2
2004	Atlanta Braves (10)	96–66	.593	Lost NLDS (Astros) 3–2
2005	Atlanta Braves (11)	90–72	.556	Lost NLDS (Astros) 3–1
2006	New York Mets (5)	97–65	.599	Won NLDS (Dodgers) 3–0; Lost NLCS (Cardinals) 4–3
2007	Philadelphia Phillies (7)	89–73	.549	Lost NLDS (Rockies) 3–0
2008	Philadelphia Phillies (8)	92–70	.568	Won NLDS (Brewers) 3–1; Won NLCS (Dodgers) 4–1; Won World Series (Rays) 4–1
2009	Philadelphia Phillies (9)	93–69	.574	Won NLDS (Rockies) 3–1; Won NLCS (Dodgers) 4–1; Lost World Series (Yankees) 4–2
2010	Philadelphia Phillies (10)	97–65	.599	Won NLDS (Reds) 3–0; Lost NLCS (Giants) 4–2
2011	Philadelphia Phillies (11)	102–60	.630	Lost NLDS (Cardinals) 3–2
2012	Washington Nationals (2)	98–64	.605	Lost NLDS (Cardinals) 3–2
2013	Atlanta Braves (12)	96–66	.593	Lost NLDS (Dodgers) 3–1
2014	Washington Nationals (3)	96–66	.593	Lost NLDS (Giants) 3–1
2015	New York Mets (6)	90–72	.556	Won NLDS (Dodgers) 3–2; Won NLCS (Cubs) 4–0; Lost World Series (Royals) 4–1
2016	Washington Nationals (4)	95–67	.586	Lost NLDS (Dodgers) 3–2
2017	Washington Nationals (5)	97–65	.599	Lost NLDS (Cubs) 3–2
2018	Atlanta Braves (13)	90–72	.556	Lost NLDS (Dodgers) 3–1
2019	Atlanta Braves (14)	97–65	.599	Lost NLDS (Cardinals) 3–2
2020††	Atlanta Braves (15)	35–25	.583	Won NLWC (Reds) 2–0; Won NLDS (Marlins) 3–0; Lost NLCS (Dodgers) 4–3
2021	Atlanta Braves (16)	88–73	.547	Won NLDS (Brewers) 3–1; Won NLCS (Dodgers) 4–2; Won World Series (Astros) 4–2
2022	Atlanta Braves (17)†††	101–61	.623	Lost NLDS (Phillies) 3–1
2023	Atlanta Braves (18)	104–58	.642	Lost NLDS (Phillies) 3–1
2024	Philadelphia Phillies (12)	95–67	.586	Lost NLDS (Mets) 3–1
2025	Philadelphia Phillies (13)	96–66	.593	Lost NLDS (Dodgers) 3–1
2026	Atlanta Braves (19)	94–68	.580	Won NLWC (Phillies) 2–1; Lost NLDS (Dodgers) 3–1

† – Due to the 1981 Major League Baseball strike, the season was split. Montreal won the second half and defeated first-half champion Philadelphia (59–48) in the postseason.
§ – Due to the 1994–95 Major League Baseball strike starting August 12, no official winner was awarded. Montreal was leading at the strike.
†† – Due to the COVID-19 pandemic, the season was shortened to 60 games. By virtue of the eight-team postseason format used for that season, division runner-up Miami (30–29, .508) also qualified for the playoffs.
††† – The Braves and Mets finished tied for first place with identical records. The Braves were declared division winners, due to having won the season series against the Mets, and the Mets received the wild card berth.

== Other postseason teams ==
Year	Winner	Record	%	GB	Playoff Results
1997	Florida Marlins	92–70	.568	9	Won NLDS (Giants) 3–0; Won NLCS (Braves) 4–2; Won World Series (Indians) 4–3
1999	New York Mets*	97–66	.595	6.5	Won NLDS (Diamondbacks) 3–1; Lost NLCS (Braves) 4–2
2000	New York Mets	94–68	.580	1	Won NLDS (Giants) 3–1; Won NLCS (Cardinals) 4–1; Lost World Series (Yankees) 4–1
2003	Florida Marlins	91–71	.562	10	Won NLDS (Giants) 3–1; Won NLCS (Cubs) 4–3; Won World Series (Yankees) 4–2
2010	Atlanta Braves	91–71	.562	6	Lost NLDS (Giants) 3–1
2012	Atlanta Braves**	94–68	.580	4	Lost NLWC (Cardinals)
2016	New York Mets**	87–75	.537	8	Lost NLWC (Giants)
2019	Washington Nationals**	93–69	.574	4	Won NLWC (Brewers); Won NLDS (Dodgers) 3–2; Won NLCS (Cardinals) 4–0; Won World Series (Astros) 4–3
2020	Miami Marlins**	31–29	.517	4	Won NLWC (Cubs) 2–0; Lost NLDS (Braves) 3–0
2022	New York Mets**†††	101–61	.623	0	Lost NLWC (Padres) 2–1
2022	Philadelphia Phillies**	87–75	.537	14	Won NLWC (Cardinals) 2–0; Won NLDS (Braves) 3–1; Won NLCS (Padres) 4–1; Lost World Series (Astros) 4–2
2023	Philadelphia Phillies**	90–72	.556	14	Won NLWC (Marlins) 2–0; Won NLDS (Braves) 3–1; Lost NLCS (Diamondbacks) 4–3
2023	Miami Marlins**	84–78	.519	20	Lost NLWC (Phillies) 2–0
2024	Atlanta Braves**††††	89–73	.549	6	Lost NLWC (Padres) 2–0
2024	New York Mets**††††	89–73	.549	6	Won NLWC (Brewers) 2–1; Won NLDS (Phillies) 3–1; Lost NLCS (Dodgers) 4–2
2026	Philadelphia Phillies**	88–74	.543	6	Lost NLWC (Braves) 2–1

* – Defeated the Cincinnati Reds in a one-game playoff for the Wild Card, 5–0.

** – From 2012 to 2019, and in 2021, the Wild Card was expanded to two teams. Those teams faced each other in the Wild Card Game to determine the final participant in the National League Division Series. In 2020 only, eight teams, including the three division winners, played in a best-of-three Wild Card Series, with the winners advancing to the Division Series. Starting in 2022, the Wild Card field was increased to three teams, and along with the lowest-ranked division winner, qualified for the best-of-three Wild Card Series to determine the remaining two slots in the Division Series.

††† – In 2022, the Braves and Mets finished tied for first place with identical 101–61 records. The Braves were declared division winners, due to having won the season series against the Mets, and the Mets received the wild card berth.

†††† – In 2024, the Braves and Mets finished tied for the second wild card berth with identical 89–73 records. The Braves won the second wild card berth, due to having won the season series against the Mets, and the Mets received the third wild card berth.

== Season results ==
^{(#)}	Denotes team that won the World Series
^{(#)}	Denotes team that won the National League pennant, but lost World Series
^{(#)}	Denotes team that qualified for the MLB postseason

Season	Team (record)						
Season	1st	2nd	3rd	4th	5th	6th	7th
1969: The National League East was formed with six inaugural members: the Chicago Cubs, Montreal Expos, New York Mets, Philadelphia Phillies, Pittsburgh Pirates and St. Louis Cardinals.
1969	N.Y. Mets (100–62)	Chicago Cubs (92–70)	Pittsburgh (88–74)	St. Louis (87–75)	Philadelphia (63–99)	Montreal (52–110)	
1970	Pittsburgh (89–73)	Chicago Cubs (84–78)	N.Y. Mets (83–79)	St. Louis (76–86)	Philadelphia (73–88)	Montreal (73–89)	
1971	Pittsburgh (97–65)	St. Louis (90–72)	Chicago Cubs (83–79)	N.Y. Mets (83–79)	Montreal (71–90)	Philadelphia (67–95)	
1972	Pittsburgh (96–59)	Chicago Cubs (85–70)	N.Y. Mets (83–73)	St. Louis (75–81)	Montreal (70–86)	Philadelphia (59–97)	
1973	N.Y. Mets (82–79)	St. Louis (81–81)	Pittsburgh (80–82)	Montreal (79–83)	Chicago Cubs (77–84)	Philadelphia (71–91)	
1974	Pittsburgh (88–74)	St. Louis (86–75)	Philadelphia (80–82)	Montreal (79–82)	N.Y. Mets (71–91)	Chicago Cubs (66–96)	
1975	Pittsburgh (92–69)	Philadelphia (86–76)	N.Y. Mets (82–80)	St. Louis (82–80)	Chicago Cubs (75–87)	Montreal (75–87)	
1976	Philadelphia (101–61)	Pittsburgh (92–70)	N.Y. Mets (86–76)	Chicago Cubs (75–87)	St. Louis (72–90)	Montreal (55–107)	
1977	Philadelphia (101–61)	Pittsburgh (96–66)	St. Louis (83–79)	Chicago Cubs (81–81)	Montreal (75–87)	N.Y. Mets (64–98)	
1978	Philadelphia (90–72)	Pittsburgh (88–73)	Chicago Cubs (79–83)	Montreal (76–86)	St. Louis (69–93)	N.Y. Mets (66–96)	
1979	Pittsburgh (98–64)	Montreal (95–65)	St. Louis (86–76)	Philadelphia (84–78)	Chicago Cubs (80–82)	N.Y. Mets (63–99)	
1980	Philadelphia (91–71)	Montreal (90–72)	Pittsburgh (83–79)	St. Louis (74–88)	N.Y. Mets (67–95)	Chicago Cubs (64–98)	
1981: Due to the player's strike, the season was split and a Division Series was created to pit the first and second half champions from each division. The Philadelphia Phillies won the first half and the Montreal Expos won the second half. The Expos won the NLDS 3–2 to claim the National League East championship.
1981	St. Louis (59–43)	Montreal (60–48)	Philadelphia (59–48)	Pittsburgh (46–56)	N.Y. Mets (41–62)	Chicago Cubs (38–65)	
1982	St. Louis (92–70)	Philadelphia (89–73)	Montreal (86–76)	Pittsburgh (84–78)	Chicago Cubs (73–89)	N.Y. Mets (65–97)	
1983	Philadelphia (90–72)	Pittsburgh (84–78)	Montreal (82–80)	St. Louis (79–83)	Chicago Cubs (71–91)	N.Y. Mets (68–94)	
1984	Chicago Cubs (96–65)	N.Y. Mets (90–72)	St. Louis (84–78)	Philadelphia (81–81)	Montreal (78–83)	Pittsburgh (75–87)	
1985	St. Louis (101–61)	N.Y. Mets (98–64)	Montreal (84–77)	Chicago Cubs (77–84)	Philadelphia (75–87)	Pittsburgh (57–104)	
1986	N.Y. Mets (108–54)	Philadelphia (86–75)	St. Louis (79–82)	Montreal (78–83)	Chicago Cubs (70–90)	Pittsburgh (64–98)	
1987	St. Louis (95–67)	N.Y. Mets (92–70)	Montreal (91–71)	Philadelphia (80–82)	Pittsburgh (80–82)	Chicago Cubs (76–85)	
1988	N.Y. Mets (100–60)	Pittsburgh (85–75)	Montreal (81–81)	Chicago Cubs (77–85)	St. Louis (76–86)	Philadelphia (65–96)	
1989	Chicago Cubs (93–69)	N.Y. Mets (87–75)	St. Louis (86–76)	Montreal (81–81)	Pittsburgh (74–88)	Philadelphia (67–95)	
1990	Pittsburgh (95–67)	N.Y. Mets (91–71)	Montreal (85–77)	Chicago Cubs (77–85)	Philadelphia (77–85)	St. Louis (70–92)	
1991	Pittsburgh (98–64)	St. Louis (84–78)	Philadelphia (78–84)	Chicago Cubs (77–83)	N.Y. Mets (77–84)	Montreal (71–90)	
1992	Pittsburgh (96–66)	Montreal (87–75)	St. Louis (83–79)	Chicago Cubs (78–84)	N.Y. Mets (72–90)	Philadelphia (70–92)	
1993: An expansion team, Florida Marlins, joined the division.
1993	Philadelphia (97–65)	Montreal (94–68)	St. Louis (87–75)	Chicago Cubs (84–78)	Pittsburgh (75–87)	Florida (64–98)	N.Y. Mets (59–103)
1994: The Chicago Cubs, Pittsburgh Pirates and St. Louis Cardinals left to join the National League Central. The Atlanta Braves joined from the National League West. Due to the player's strike, the remainder of the season was cancelled on August 12. The postseason and World Series was also cancelled.
1994	Montreal (74–40)	Atlanta (68–46)	N.Y. Mets (55–58)	Philadelphia (54–61)	Florida (51–64)		
1995	^{(1)} Atlanta (90–54)	N.Y. Mets (69–75)	Philadelphia (69–75)	Florida (67–76)	Montreal (66–78)		
1996	^{(1)} Atlanta (96–66)	Montreal (88–74)	Florida (80–82)	N.Y. Mets (71–91)	Philadelphia (67–95)		
1997	^{(1)} Atlanta (101–61)	^{(4)} Florida (92–70)	N.Y. Mets (88–74)	Montreal (78–84)	Philadelphia (68–94)		
1998	^{(1)} Atlanta (106–56)	N.Y. Mets (88–74)	Philadelphia (75–87)	Montreal (65–97)	Florida (54–108)		
1999	^{(1)} Atlanta (103–59)	^{(4)} N.Y. Mets^{[a]} (97–66)	Philadelphia (77–85)	Montreal (68–94)	Florida (64–98)		
2000	^{(3)} Atlanta^{[b]} (95–67)	^{(4)} N.Y. Mets (94–68)	Florida (79–82)	Montreal (67–95)	Philadelphia (65–97)		
2001	^{(3)} Atlanta (88–74)	Philadelphia (86–76)	N.Y. Mets (82–80)	Florida (76–86)	Montreal (68–94)		
2002	^{(1)} Atlanta (101–59)	Montreal (83–79)	Philadelphia (80–81)	Florida (79–83)	N.Y. Mets (75–86)		
2003	^{(1)} Atlanta (101–61)	^{(4)} Florida (91–71)	Philadelphia (86–76)	Montreal (83–79)	N.Y. Mets (66–95)		
2004	^{(2)} Atlanta (96–66)	Philadelphia (86–76)	Florida (83–79)	N.Y. Mets (71–91)	Montreal (67–95)		
2005: The Montreal Expos relocated to Washington, D.C. as the Washington Nationals.
2005	^{(2)} Atlanta (90–72)	Philadelphia (88–74)	Florida (83–79)	N.Y. Mets (83–79)	Washington (81–81)		
2006	^{(1)} N.Y. Mets (97–65)	Philadelphia (85–77)	Atlanta (79–83)	Florida (78–84)	Washington (71–91)		
2007	^{(2)} Philadelphia (89–73)	N.Y. Mets (88–74)	Atlanta (84–78)	Washington (73–89)	Florida (71–91)		
2008	^{(2)} Philadelphia (92–70)	N.Y. Mets (89–73)	Florida (84–77)	Atlanta (72–90)	Washington (59–102)		
2009	^{(2)} Philadelphia (93–69)	Florida (87–75)	Atlanta (86–76)	N.Y. Mets (70–92)	Washington (59–103)		
2010	^{(1)} Philadelphia (97–65)	^{(4)} Atlanta (91–71)	Florida (80–82)	N.Y. Mets (79–83)	Washington (69–93)		
2011	^{(1)} Philadelphia (102–60)	Atlanta (89–73)	Washington (80–81)	N.Y. Mets (77–85)	Florida (72–90)		
2012: The Florida Marlins rebranded as the Miami Marlins.
2012	^{(1)} Washington (98–64)	^{(4)} Atlanta (94–68)	Philadelphia (81–81)	N.Y. Mets (74–88)	Miami (69–93)		
2013	^{(2)} Atlanta (96–66)	Washington (86–76)	N.Y. Mets (74–88)	Philadelphia (73–89)	Miami (62–100)		
2014	^{(1)} Washington (96–66)	Atlanta (79–83)	N.Y. Mets (79–83)	Miami (77–85)	Philadelphia (73–89)		
2015	^{(3)} N.Y. Mets (90–72)	Washington (83–79)	Miami (71–91)	Atlanta (67–95)	Philadelphia (63–99)		
2016	^{(2)} Washington (95–67)	^{(4)} N.Y. Mets^{[c]} (87–75)	Miami (79–82)	Philadelphia (71–91)	Atlanta (68–93)		
2017	^{(2)} Washington (97–65)	Miami (77–85)	Atlanta (72–90)	N.Y. Mets (70–92)	Philadelphia (66–96)		
2018	^{(3)} Atlanta (90–72)	Washington (82–80)	Philadelphia (80–82)	N.Y. Mets (77–85)	Miami (63–98)		
2019	^{(2)} Atlanta (97–65)	^{(4)} Washington (93–69)	N.Y. Mets (86–76)	Philadelphia (81–81)	Miami (57–105)		
2020: Due to the COVID-19 pandemic, the season was shortened to 60 games. The postseason field was expanded to eight teams and the wild-card round became a best-of-three series.
2020	^{(2)} Atlanta (35–25)	^{(6)} Miami (31–29)	Philadelphia (28–32)	Washington (26–34)	N.Y. Mets (26–34)		
2021	^{(3)} Atlanta (88–73)	Philadelphia (82–80)	N.Y. Mets (77–85)	Miami (67–95)	Washington (65–97)		
2022	^{(2)} Atlanta^{[d]} (101–61)	^{(4)} N.Y. Mets^{[d]} (101–61)	^{(6)} Philadelphia (87–75)	Miami (69–93)	Washington (55–107)		
2023	^{(1)} Atlanta (104–58)	^{(4)} Philadelphia (90–72)	^{(5)} Miami^{[e]} (84–78)	N.Y. Mets (75–87)	Washington (71–91)		
2024	^{(2)} Philadelphia (95–67)	^{(5)} Atlanta^{[f]} (89–73)	^{(6)} N.Y. Mets^{[f]} (89–73)	Washington (71–91)	Miami (62–100)		
2025	^{(2)} Philadelphia (96–66)	N.Y. Mets^{[g]} (83–79)	Miami (79–83)	Atlanta (76–86)	Washington (66–96)		
2026	^{(3)} Atlanta (94–68)	^{(6)} Philadelphia (88–74)	Miami (80–82)	Washington (77–85)	N.Y. Mets (74–88)		

Notes and tiebreakers

- ^{a} New York and Cincinnati of the National League Central were tied for the wild-card berth and played in a tie-breaker game. The Mets won 5–0 to claim the wild-card spot.
- ^{b} Atlanta and St. Louis of the National League Central were tied for the second and third seed, but the Braves were relegated to the third seed by losing the season series 4–3.
- ^{c} New York and San Francisco of the National League West were tied for both wild-card berths, but the Mets claimed the first wild-card spot by winning the season series 4–3.
- ^{d} Atlanta and New York were tied for the division title, but the Braves claimed the National League East title by winning the season series 10–9.
- ^{e} Miami and Arizona of the National League West were tied for the fifth seed and the second wild-card berth, but the Marlins claimed the second wild-card spot by winning the season series 4–2.
- ^{f} Atlanta, New York and Arizona of the National League West were tied for the fifth seed and the second wild card berth, but the Braves claimed the second wild card spot by winning the season series 7–6 over the Mets, and the Mets claimed the third wild card spot by winning the season series 4–3 over the Diamondbacks. The Diamondbacks also lost to the Braves 5–2 in their season series.
- ^{g} New York and Cincinnati of the National League Central were tied for the sixth seed and the third wild card berth, but the Reds claimed the third wild card spot by winning the season series 4–2

== NL East statistics ==
Team	Division championships			Postseason records (Note: Reflects postseason record of each team only during the team's time as a member of the NL East.)				
Team	Number	Year(s)	Most recent	Wild Card (Note: Number of times qualifying as a wild card team.)	NLWC	NLDS	NLCS	World Series
Current Teams in Division
Atlanta Braves	19	1995–2005, 2013, 2018–2021, 2022*, 2023, 2026	2026	3	1–2	8–11	4–4	2–2
Philadelphia Phillies	13	1976–1978, 1980, 1983, 1993, 2007–2011, 2024–2025	2025	2	2–0	5–4	6–5	2–4
New York Mets	6	1969, 1973, 1986, 1988, 2006, 2015	2015	5	1–2	5–0	5–4	2–3
Washington Nationals / Montreal Expos	5	1981, 2012, 2014, 2016–2017	2017	1	1–0	2–4	1–1	1–0
Miami Marlins (Note: Formerly known as Florida Marlins.)	0	—	—	4	1–1	2–1	2–0	2–0
Former Teams in Division
Pittsburgh Pirates†	9	1970–1972, 1974–1975, 1979, 1990–1992	1992	—	—	0–0	2–7	2–0
St. Louis Cardinals†	3	1982, 1985, 1987	1987	—	—	0–0	3–0	1–2
Chicago Cubs†	2	1984, 1989	1989	—	—	0–0	0–2	0–0
Total	57	1969–1993, 1995–present	2024	15	6‍–‍5	22‍–‍20	23‍–‍23	12‍–‍11

* – Won division via tiebreaker
† indicates no longer in division since 1994

Totals updated through conclusion of the 2024 postseason.

== Rivalries ==
- Braves–Mets rivalry
- Mets–Phillies rivalry

== See also ==
- National League Central
- National League West
- American League East
- American League Central
- American League West
