= Lenny Randle =

American baseball player (1949–2024)

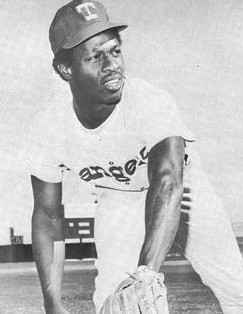
- Randle in 1974
- Third baseman / Second baseman
- Born: February 12, 1949; Long Beach, California, U.S.
- Died: December 29, 2024 (aged 75); Murrieta, California, U.S.
- Batted: Switch Threw: Right

MLB debut
- June 16, 1971, for the Washington Senators

Last MLB appearance
- June 20, 1982, for the Seattle Mariners

MLB statistics
- Batting average: .257
- Home runs: 27
- Runs batted in: 322
- Stats at Baseball Reference

Teams
- Washington Senators / Texas Rangers (1971–1976); New York Mets (1977–1978); New York Yankees (1979); Chicago Cubs (1980); Seattle Mariners (1981–1982)
Medals
International Amateur Tournament
| Gold medal – first place | 1968 Mexico City | Team |

Leonard Shenoff Randle (February 12, 1949 – December 29, 2024) was an American professional baseball player. He played in Major League Baseball (MLB) for the Washington Senators/Texas Rangers franchise, New York Mets, New York Yankees, Chicago Cubs, and Seattle Mariners from 1971 to 1982. He also played in the Italian Baseball League. The National Baseball Hall of Fame wrote that "Randle may have seen more memorable moments than any other player of his era."

== Early life ==
Born on February 12, 1949, in Long Beach, California, Randle was captain of both the baseball and football teams at Centennial High School in Compton. He was selected by the St. Louis Cardinals in the 10th round (190th overall) 1967 Major League Baseball draft, but chose instead to attend Arizona State University. Along with playing college football and second base for the 1969 NCAA championship Arizona State Sun Devils baseball team, Randle graduated with a Bachelor of Science degree in 1973.

== Professional career ==
=== MLB ===
==== Washington Senators and Texas Rangers ====
Randle was the first round pick (10th overall) of the Washington Senators in the secondary phase of the June 1970 Major League Baseball draft. After a little more than one season in the minors, Randle debuted as a second baseman with the Washington Senators in 1971. He made his major league debut on June 16, going 1-for-4 in a 5–1 loss to the Oakland Athletics. He split time between the minors and with the newly renamed and relocated Texas Rangers his first three seasons, spending most of 1973 in Triple-A with the Spokane Indians.

Randle had a breakthrough 1974 season, batting .302 with a home run, 49 RBI, 26 stolen bases and 65 runs scored in 151 games while splitting time at second base, third base and in the outfield. He split time in all three positions in 1975 as well before being returned to second base in 1976.

==== 1974 brawl ====
During a game in Arlington between the Texas Rangers and the Cleveland Indians on May 29, 1974, in the bottom of the eighth inning, Randle bunted off Cleveland pitcher Milt Wilcox, one pitch after Wilcox had thrown a pitch that flew behind Randle's back. But as Wilcox tried to tag him out, Randle smashed into Wilcox. As Randle attempted to continue to first base, he was tackled by other Cleveland players. Randle was ruled out because he had deliberately left the baseline to collide with Wilcox. A bench-clearing brawl ensued. This incident preceded the 10 Cent Beer Night riot in Cleveland six days later on June 4.

==== 1977 punching incident ====
During spring training in 1977, first round draft choice Bump Wills earned the starting second base job over Randle. On March 28, the Rangers were in Orlando for an exhibition game with the Minnesota Twins. During batting practice an hour before the first pitch, Randle approached Rangers manager Frank Lucchesi. Suddenly, Randle punched Lucchesi in the face three times before the altercation was stopped by bystanders. Randle said that Lucchesi had called him a "punk", and, though Lucchesi denied it, he had done so to a group of reporters and insisted they print it.

Lucchesi was hospitalized for a week, needing plastic surgery to repair his fractured cheekbone which Randle had broken in three places. He also received bruises to his kidney and back. The Rangers suspended Randle for 30 days without pay and fined him $10,000. On April 26, before the suspension was complete, Texas traded him to the New York Mets for cash and a player to be named later; Texas later received Rick Auerbach.

Randle was charged with assault, and pleaded no contest to battery charges in a Florida court, receiving a $1,050 fine. The Rangers fired Lucchesi on June 21. Lucchesi sued Randle for $200,000. They settled for $20,000.

==== New York Mets ====
Randle began his tenure with the Mets playing second base. With opening day third baseman Roy Staiger batting only .236 with one home run and eight runs batted in, Randle was shifted to third base by Joe Torre when he replaced Joe Frazier as manager of the team.

Randle ended an extra innings marathon with the Montreal Expos on July 9 at Shea Stadium in the seventeenth inning with a walk off home run off Will McEnaney. Four days later, he was at bat for the Mets when the power went out at Shea Stadium during the New York City blackout of 1977. He commented, "I thought, 'God, I'm gone.' I thought for sure He was calling me. I thought it was my last at‐bat."

For the season, Randle batted .304 with five home runs, 27 RBI, a career-high 33 stolen bases and 78 runs scored in 136 games for the last place Mets. His stats fell off considerably in 1978, when he batted .233 with two home runs, 35 RBI, 14 stolen bases and 53 runs in 132 games. The Mets released Randle during spring training in 1979.

==== San Francisco Giants, Pittsburgh Pirates and New York Yankees ====
After his release from the Mets, Randle signed with the San Francisco Giants on May 12, 1979, and was assigned to their Triple-A Pacific Coast League affiliate in Phoenix. He was traded along with Bill Madlock and Dave Roberts from the Giants to the Pittsburgh Pirates for Al Holland, Ed Whitson and Fred Breining on June 28, but again was assigned to their Triple-A affiliate. After 24 games with the Portland Beavers, he saw his first major league experience of the season when his contract was purchased by the New York Yankees on August 3. He batted .179 with 3 RBI in 20 games as an outfielder with the Yankees.

==== Seattle Mariners and Chicago Cubs ====
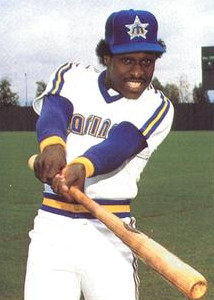
Randle in 1981

On February 21, 1980, Randle signed with the Seattle Mariners as a non-roster invitee. By the end of spring training, he was dealt to the Chicago Cubs. He batted .276 and with five home runs, 39 RBI and 19 stolen bases as the Cubs' regular third baseman. On February 18, 1981, Randle returned to the Mariners as a free agent. In two seasons with the Mariners, he batted .223 with four home runs and 26 RBI backing up second and third base.

With the Kansas City Royals visiting the Kingdome on May 27, 1981, Royals center fielder Amos Otis hit a slow roller down the third base line in the sixth inning. Randle got on his hands and knees and blew the ball over the foul line; the umpires disallowed his action, and ruled it fair.

In a 12-year, 1,138 game major league career, Randle batted .257 (1,016-for-3,950) with 27 home runs, 488 runs scored and 322 RBI.

=== Italian Baseball League ===
In 1983, Randle became the first American major league player to play baseball in Italy. He holds the record for the longest home run in the Italian Serie-A1 league, most home runs and singles hit in a three-game series and the most hits in a three-game series. Randle won a batting title in Italy with a .477 batting average. In October 1983, he was featured on 60 Minutes for his involvement with Italian baseball.

Following his stint in Italy, Randle played with the St. Petersburg Pelicans in the Senior Professional Baseball Association.

== Legacy ==
The unusual events throughout Randle's career led Rolling Stone to call him a "viable candidate" for "baseball's version of 'The Most Interesting Man in the World'". Later that year in 2015, the documentary "Lenny Randle: The Most Interesting Man in Baseball" premiered on MLB Network. He was inducted into the Arizona State University Sports Hall of Fame.

== Personal life ==
Randle and his wife had three sons. Bradley played briefly in the National Football League and Canadian Football League. Randle's cousin Marques Johnson played in the National Basketball Association.

In addition to his native English, Randle was fluent in French, Spanish and Italian. He died in Murrieta, California, on December 29, 2024, at the age of 75.
