= Gil Flores =

Puerto Rican baseball player (born 1952)

- Outfielder
- Born: October 27, 1952 (age 73); Ponce, Puerto Rico
- Batted: Right Threw: Right

MLB debut
- May 8, 1977, for the California Angels

Last MLB appearance
- September 30, 1979, for the New York Mets

MLB statistics
- Batting average: .269
- Home runs: 2
- Runs batted in: 47
- Stats at Baseball Reference

Teams
- California Angels (1977); New York Mets (1978–1979)

Gilberto Garcia Flores (born October 27, 1952) is a Puerto Rican former Major League Baseball player.

Originally signed by the Baltimore Orioles as an amateur free agent in 1970, he batted .288 in a little over one season in their farm system. Following the 1972 season, he went to the California Angels in the minor league draft. He made his major league debut in 1977, and batted .278 with one home run and 26 runs batted in.

He began the 1978 season assigned to the triple A Salt Lake City Gulls before being dealt to the New York Mets for a player to be named later on July 28. He joined the Mets as a September call-up, and batted .276 in eleven games. His batting average dipped to .194 in 1979. He remained in the minors with the Mets through 1984.

== See also ==
- List of Major League Baseball players from Puerto Rico
