= Tom Hausman =

American baseball player (1953–2019)

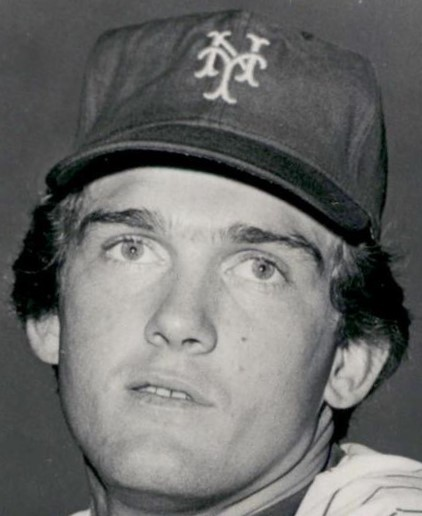
- Pitcher
- Born: March 31, 1953; Mobridge, South Dakota, U.S.
- Died: January 16, 2019 (aged 65); Las Vegas, Nevada, U.S.
- Batted: Right Threw: Right

MLB debut
- April 26, 1975, for the Milwaukee Brewers

Last MLB appearance
- September 30, 1982, for the Atlanta Braves

MLB statistics
- Win–loss record: 15–23
- Earned run average: 3.80
- Strikeouts: 180
- Stats at Baseball Reference

Teams
- Milwaukee Brewers (1975–1976); New York Mets (1978–1982); Atlanta Braves (1982)

Thomas Matthew Hausman (March 31, 1953 – January 16, 2019) was an American Major League Baseball pitcher. He was the first free agent signing of the New York Mets.

== Early career ==
Hausman was born in Mobridge, South Dakota, but moved to California as a child. He was an All-state baseball and basketball player, and pitched two years of American Legion ball in La Verne, California. The Milwaukee Brewers drafted the right hander right out of high school in the tenth round of the 1971 Major League Baseball draft.

== Minor leagues ==
Hausman spent his first professional baseball season in the class "A" New York–Penn League with the fourth-place Newark Co-Pilots. He appeared in thirteen games and 74 innings and allowed 54 hits and 30 walks. He struck out 54 and had an earned run average of 2.68.

His 1972 season was spent playing for Joe Nossek and the class "A" Midwest League champions in Danville. An injury placing him on the disabled list from June 13 to August 6, limiting his appearances to only ten games, with 55 innings pitched. He gave up 53 hits and 17 walks, struck out 32 and his ERA was a 2.13.

As a starter in 1973, Hausman pitched 162 innings in 25 games at class "AA" Texas League for the Shreveport Captains. With a record of 12–9, he allowed 193 hits, 49 walks, struck out 56 and had a rather high 4.44 ERA, however, his performance earned him a promotion to AAA for the 1974 season.

In 26 games for the Pacific Coast League's last-place Sacramento Solons, he led the league in complete games with eleven. In 180 innings, he struck out 104, but gave up 215 hits, fifty of which were home runs. As a result, he had an inflated 6.00 ERA.

== Milwaukee Brewers ==
The fifth place Milwaukee Brewers needed pitching in 1975, and Hausman made the team. He made his major league debut in relief in a 10-1 loss to the New York Yankees on April 26. On May 27, Hausman entered a game against the Chicago White Sox in relief of Ed Sprague in the second inning with the Brewers already down 3-0. As soon as Hausman entered the game, an error by Robin Yount at shortstop made the score 4-0. From there, Hausman pitched 6.2 innings, and allowed three runs. The Brewers, meanwhile, battered Wilbur Wood for eight runs to earn Hausman his first major league victory.

Hausman's first major league start was cut short by a back injury. He made his second start in the first game of a July 6 doubleheader with the Detroit Tigers. He faced four batters without recording an out. Undeterred, he pitched seven innings in the second game.

His record was 3-2 with a 3.92 ERA when he was moved into the starting rotation. On July 27, Hausman pitched eight innings of scoreless ball against the Baltimore Orioles, and was in line for his first win as a starting pitcher when he handed the ball to relief pitcher Tom Murphy with a 6-0 lead. The bullpen imploded for six runs, and Hausman ended up with a no decision. Facing the O's again in his next start, Hausman pitched his first career complete game, and lost, 3-1. Hausman would end up going 0-4 with a 4.66 ERA in August. His recurring back injury forced the Brewers to shut him down for the last month of the season.

In 1976, Hausman appeared in only three games with the Brewers, all in relief. In three innings of work, he gave up three hits, three walks and two earned runs. The rest of the year was spent with the AAA Spokane Indians who finished last in the PCL West. He played in 22 games (111 innings) and allowed 135 hits and 36 walks for an ERA of 5.68. Hausman struck out forty and was on their suspended list from August 14 to September 7.

In 1977, Hausman remained the whole year at Spokane where he led the PCL in games started with 30. He completed a career high 207 innings, had a 13–6 record for the second place team. Hausman gave up 251 hits, 55 walks with a 4.22 ERA. He struck out 88. He declared as a free agent after the season.

== New York Mets ==
On, November 21, 1977, Hausman signed as a free agent with the New York Mets. Despite being the franchise's first free agent signing, Hausman began the 1978 season in triple A with the Tidewater Tides. In ten starts, Hausman went 5-2 with a 1.22 ERA to quickly earn a call up to New York; however, a stint on the DL from May 25 to June 17 delayed his Mets' debut until July 7. Hausman earned his first win as a starter on July 17, against the Atlanta Braves, and also collected his first career run batted in. His finest start of the season was his third start, also against the Braves. He pitched eight innings of shutout ball before handing the ball to Mets closer Skip Lockwood. All told, Hausman went 3-3 with a 4.70 ERA.

As he had the prior year, Hausman, began the 1979 season in AAA. For Tidewater (12 g, 72 inn), Hausman gave up 75 hits, 23 walks and struck out 27. His ERA was 4.50. When he came up in June, he split his time between starting and relief roles, and lost all four of his first four decisions despite an impressive 2.84 ERA. He earned his first career save on July 8 against the San Diego Padres, pitching 3.1 innings of one hit ball. His first win of the season was a complete game victory over Vida Blue and the San Francisco Giants six days later. He was lifted early in his July 31 start against the Pittsburgh Pirates when he hurt his lower back covering first on a ground ball. After sitting out the entire month of August, he wouldn't earn a second win until September 26 against the Chicago Cubs. For the season, he went 2-6 with two saves and a 2.75 ERA.

Hausman began the 1980 season as a starter. After falling to 0-1 with a 6.75 ERA, he was moved into a "mop up duty" role in the bullpen, but an exceptional month of June changed that. His first win of the season came on June 6 against the Pirates. He entered in the fifth inning, and pitched 4.2 innings of scoreless ball. His next win came in his next appearance, when he pitched five innings of shutout ball against the Los Angeles Dodgers. Perhaps his finest performance came on June 27, when he earned his only save on the season by pitching three innings of no hit ball against the eventual World Series champion Philadelphia Phillies.

The strong pitching continued into July. Facing the Montreal Expos on July 3, he pitched five innings and allowed only one unearned run, picking up his fourth win of the season. From June 6 through July 18, Hausman was 4-1 with a 0.94 ERA. For the season, he went 6-5 with a 3.98 ERA. He pitched a career high 122 innings, and gave up 125 hits and only 26 walks while striking out 53.

Slowed by an elbow injury in 1981, he made only 20 relief appearances for the Mets. In 33 innings, he allowed 28 hits and 7 walks with 13 strike outs, while posting a sparkling ERA of 2.18. The injuries continued in 1982, as he suffered both shoulder and elbow problems. He pitched part of the year for Tidewater (9.00 ERA) and was in 21 games for the Mets (37 inn, 44 hits, 6 walks, 16 so, 4.42 ERA, .295 OBA). On September 10, he was reunited with his former manager Joe Torre, when he was traded to the first place Braves for Carlos Diaz. During their stretch run, he appeared in 3 games (4 innings) for his new club, allowing 6 hits and 4 walks.

== Late career ==
Hausman signed with the Pirates during spring training 1983. He appeared in four games with the Pacific Coast League's Hawaii Islanders. going 2–1 with a 1.59 ERA. He was out of baseball in 1984, but attempted a comeback in the PCL for the Padres' affiliate, the Las Vegas Stars, and the Dodgers' affiliate, the Albuquerque Dukes in 1985. His record was 3–4 with a 5.25 ERA.

== Career stats ==
| W | L | Pct | ERA | G | GS | GF | SHO | IP | H | ER | R | HR | BB | K | WP | HBP | BAA | Fld% | Avg. |
| 15 | 23 | .395 | 3.80 | 160 | 33 | 52 | 0 | 441 | 439 | 186 | 211 | 37 | 121 | 180 | 12 | 16 | .262 | .959 | .111 |

== Death ==
Hausman died on January 16, 2019.
