= Alex Treviño =

Mexican baseball player (born 1957)

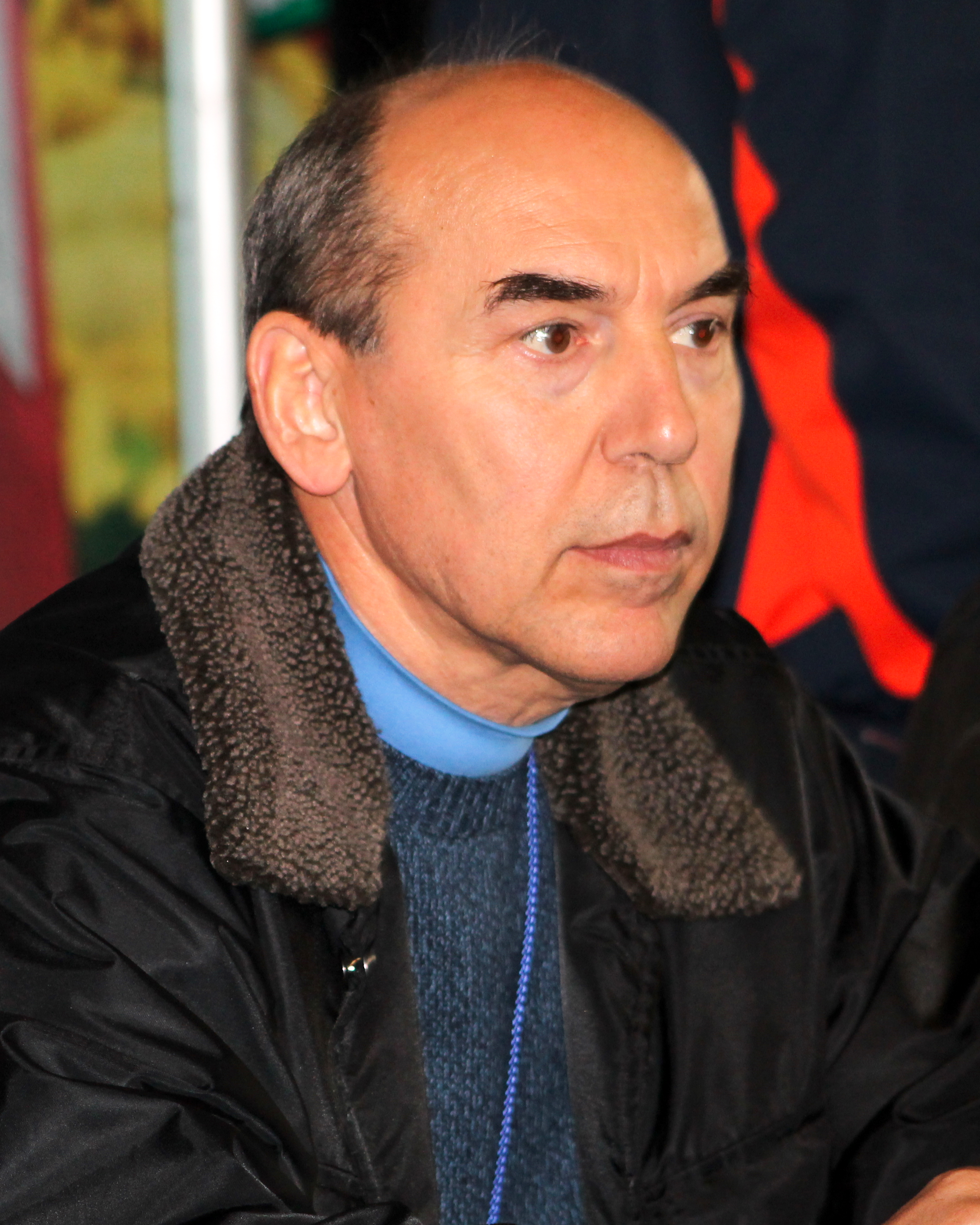
- Treviño in 2015
- Catcher
- Born: August 26, 1957 (age 68); Monterrey, Nuevo León, Mexico
- Batted: Right Threw: Right

MLB debut
- September 11, 1978, for the New York Mets

Last MLB appearance
- September 30, 1990, for the Cincinnati Reds

MLB statistics
- Batting average: .249
- Home runs: 23
- Runs batted in: 244
- Stats at Baseball Reference

Teams
- New York Mets (1978–1981); Cincinnati Reds (1982–1984); Atlanta Braves (1984); San Francisco Giants (1985); Los Angeles Dodgers (1986–1987); Houston Astros (1988–1990); New York Mets (1990); Cincinnati Reds (1990)

Career highlights and awards
- World Series champion (1990)

Alejandro Treviño Castro (born August 26, 1957) is a Mexican former professional baseball catcher. He played in Major League Baseball (MLB) for the New York Mets, Cincinnati Reds, Atlanta Braves, San Francisco Giants, Los Angeles Dodgers, and Houston Astros from 1978 to 1990. Since 1996, Treviño has been a broadcaster for Astros games. He is the younger brother of MLB outfielder Bobby Treviño.

== Early years ==
Treviño was born in Monterrey, Nuevo León, Mexico. He was ten years old when his brother debuted with the California Angels in 1968, and by the time he was fifteen years old, he began playing professional baseball himself, with Ciudad Victoria Henequneros in the Mexican Center League. He was sixteen years old when the New York Mets purchased his contract from Ciudad Victoria. Originally an infielder in Mexico, he was moved behind the plate his first season with the Appalachian League Marion Mets. He batted .237 with seven home runs & 108 runs batted in in the Mets' farm system when he received a September call up in 1978.

== New York Mets ==
He made his major league debut on September 11, catching Mardie Cornejo in the ninth. His first at bat came pinch hitting against the Philadelphia Phillies on September 23. He made his first start against the Chicago Cubs at Wrigley Field on September 29, and collected his first major league hit against Mike Krukow in the sixth. On October 1, the last day of the season, Treviño started the game behind the plate, but moved to third base in the third inning.

Though Treviño was primarily a catcher by this point in his career, the Mets made regular use of his ability to play the infield. In 1979, he made 27 appearances at third base and eight at second. The Mets were following a similar script in 1980 until injuries to John Stearns and Ron Hodges made Treviño the primary catcher. He responded by setting a career high in RBIs (37), and throwing out a league leading 44% of potential base stealers (47 of 106). In a more limited role, he threw out 48% in 1979. He returned to being Stearns' backup in 1981, batting .279 in the first half of the strike shortened season. While his production dropped in the second half (.222 avg., 2 RBIs), he returned to regular use on the infield, and also made his outfield debut.

Following the season, he and pitchers Greg A. Harris and Jim Kern were dealt to the Cincinnati Reds for former National League MVP George Foster.

== Cincinnati Reds ==
As Johnny Bench was 34 years old to start the 1982 season, his days behind the plate were officially over. Joe Nolan, who had done the bulk of the catching for the Reds in 1981, was dealt to the Baltimore Orioles during Spring training, opening the door for Treviño to be Bench's heir. On September 14, in his 1,056th career at bat, Treviño hit his first career home run off the San Francisco Giants' Atlee Hammaker. For the season, Treviño batted .251 with 33 RBIs and just the one home run in a career high 401 plate appearances. While Treviño's numbers were not surprising (he batted .261 in his Mets career), Treviño seemed to fall off defensively. Whereas he had caught 45% of base stealers as a Met, in his first season as a Red, that dipped to 29% (league average: 32%).

1982 was the first time in Cincinnati Reds franchise history that they lost over a hundred games, and the "Big Red Machine" was used to more production from the catcher position. The catching duties were handed over to former first-round pick Dann Bilardello for 1983. As his backup, Treviño batted .216 with one home run and thirteen RBIs. Sixteen games into the 1984 season, Treviño was dealt to the Atlanta Braves for a player to be named later.

== Atlanta Braves ==
The Braves finished the 1983 season in second place in the National League West, three games back of the Los Angeles Dodgers. Treviño was excited to join a winning franchise for the first time in his career. In his first game as a Brave, Treviño caught former Mets teammate Pete Falcone, who held the Houston Astros to three hits in pitching his first shutout since 1981. It was the first of eight consecutive wins with Treviño behind the plate that the Braves strung together upon his arrival. During this stretch, Treviño batted .400 (12 for 30) with five RBIs and six runs scored. Facing the Montreal Expos on May 6, Treviño hit an eighth inning one out double, and came around to score the go ahead run on Mike Jorgensen's single to give the Braves the lead. Tim Wallach led off the bottom of the ninth with a home run for Montreal. The Expos then put the tying and winning runs on base with no outs. Treviño picked the lead runner off second to ease the threat. In his only season in Atlanta, Treviño batted .244 with three home runs and 28 RBIs splitting catching duties pretty evenly with Bruce Benedict.

== San Francisco Giants ==
Seven games into the 1985 season, the Braves and San Francisco Giants swapped catchers, a straight exchange of Treviño for John Rabb. Treviño spent one season in San Francisco. Whereas he only received 157 at bats as Bob Brenly's backup, he hit a career high six home runs. After the season, he was dealt to the Los Angeles Dodgers for outfielder Candy Maldonado.

== Los Angeles Dodgers ==
With Mike Scoscia firmly locking down the catching job in L.A., Treviño did not see much playing time there, either. On June 13, 1986 against the San Diego Padres at Jack Murphy Stadium, Treviño and Fernando Valenzuela formed the first Mexican-born battery in major league history. For the season, he batted .262 with four home runs and 26 RBIs, and threw out 44% of base stealers (31 of 70). He also made his debut at first base. In 1987, he batted .222 with three home runs and sixteen RBIs.

== Houston Astros ==
Toward the end of Spring training 1988, the Dodgers signed free agent veteran catcher Rick Dempsey. Five days later, the Dodgers released Treviño. Soon afterward, Treviño signed with the Houston Astros. He spent the 1988 season platooning with Alan Ashby behind the plate, and the 1989 season as Craig Biggio's backup.

After two full seasons in Houston, Treviño spent his final year in Major League baseball with three different teams. Treviño began the 1990 season in Houston, then returned to the New York Mets briefly before finishing his career back in Cincinnati with the Reds. The year in which he finished his career as a member of the Reds, they went on to win the 1990 World Series.

== Career statistics ==
Games	PA	AB	Runs	Hits	2B	3B	HR	RBI	BB	SO	HBP	Avg.	OBP	Slg.	Fld%	CS%
939	2701	2430	245	604	117	10	23	244	205	317	19	.249	.310	.333	.978	35%

Treviño went 3-for-10 in his return to the Mets in 1990. He holds the franchise record for most at bats without a home run (733). He hit two against them in 131 at bats.

== Broadcasting career ==
Treviño joined the Houston Astros broadcast team in 1996 and has called more than 3,000 Astros games, seven postseason appearances and the 2005 World Series run. In September 2014, Treviño was inducted into the Houston Baseball Media Wall of Honor for his significant and lasting contributions to the landscape of Houston baseball through his work in broadcasting. As of 2019, Treviño's 24 seasons in the broadcast booth are the most in franchise history by a Spanish broadcaster, surpassing Orlando Sanchez Diago's record of 21 years.
