= Mike Bruhert =

American baseball player (born 1951)

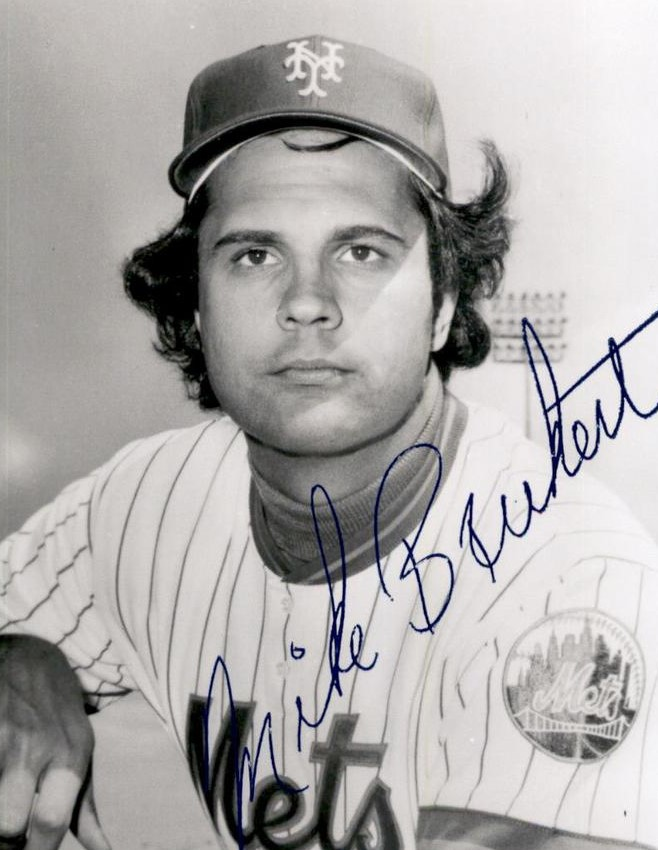
- Pitcher
- Born: June 24, 1951 (age 74); Jamaica, New York, U.S.
- Batted: Right Threw: Right

MLB debut
- April 9, 1978, for the New York Mets

Last MLB appearance
- September 29, 1978, for the New York Mets

MLB statistics
- Win–loss record: 4–11
- Earned run average: 4.78
- Strikeouts: 56
- Stats at Baseball Reference

Teams
- New York Mets (1978)

Michael Edwin Bruhert (born June 21, 1951) is an American former Major League Baseball pitcher. He is the former son-in-law of former New York Mets manager Gil Hodges.

Bruhert attended Christ the King Regional High School in Middle Village, Queens where he won only one game as a pitcher in four seasons. After high school, he worked scooping ice cream at a local Carvel and played for a local sandlot team. Bruhert found enough success in the Queens-Nassau Summer League to land a tryout at Shea Stadium, after which he signed with the New York Mets.

Shortly after joining the Mets, he began dating Gil Hodges' daughter, Irene. The two were engaged by the time Bruhert was selected by the Philadelphia Phillies in the Rule 5 draft on November 27, 1972. Following Spring training 1973, he was returned to the Mets.

After seven seasons in the Mets' farm system, in which he went 38–51 with a 3.69 earned run average, Bruhert made his major league debut in the second game of a doubleheader with the Montreal Expos on April 9, 1978. He pitched six strong innings, allowing only one earned run (two unearned), however, he took the loss. He earned his first win in his next start against the St. Louis Cardinals. His finest performance was a complete game shutout of the Phillies on September 17, in which he struck out five and allowed just four hits.

For the season, Bruhert went 4–11 with a 4.78 ERA and 56 strikeouts. He was traded to the Texas Rangers in 1979 along with Bob Myrick for star pitcher Dock Ellis. Bruhert went 9–10 with a 5.58 ERA in the Rangers' farm system, but never reached the majors.

He spent the 1981 and 1982 seasons with the New York Yankees' International League affiliate, the Columbus Clippers, going 11–7 with a 3.69 ERA, before retiring. Shortly afterwards, he became pitching coach at Fordham University.

He served in the United States Army Reserve in the early 1970s.
