= Kevin Kobel =

American baseball player (born 1953)

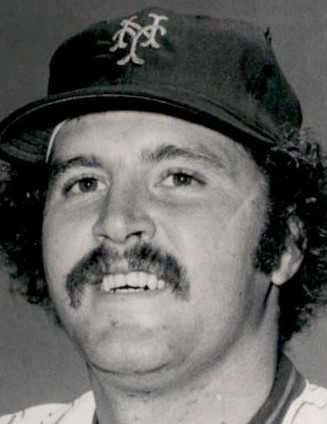
- Pitcher
- Born: October 2, 1953 (age 72); Buffalo, New York, U.S.
- Batted: Right Threw: Left

MLB debut
- September 8, 1973, for the Milwaukee Brewers

Last MLB appearance
- June 7, 1980, for the New York Mets

MLB statistics
- Win–loss record: 18–34
- Earned run average: 3.88
- Strikeouts: 205
- Stats at Baseball Reference

Teams
- Milwaukee Brewers (1973–1974, 1976); New York Mets (1978–1980)

Kevin Richard Kobel (born October 2, 1953) is an American former professional baseball pitcher. Having made his major league debut with the Milwaukee Brewers a month shy of his 20th birthday on September 8, 1973, he is the only pitcher in franchise history to make his major league debut as a teenager. He later pitched for the New York Mets.

== Career ==
Kobel was selected by the Milwaukee Brewers out of Saint Francis High School in Athol Springs, New York in the 11th round (250th overall) of the 1971 Major League Baseball draft. After three seasons in their farm system, in which he went 20–24 with a 3.60 earned run average, Kobel joined the Brewers as a September call-up in 1973. He began his major league career with a perfect inning of work in which he struck out the first two New York Yankees batters he faced and induced a weak ground ball to first base from the third. In his second inning, however, he surrendered a grand slam to light-hitting shortstop Fred Stanley.

His first major league win also came against the Yankees on May 12, 1974. Kobel held the Yankees scoreless on two hits through seven innings in the rain delayed second game of a doubleheader at Shea Stadium. After surrendering a home run to Rick Dempsey to lead off the eighth, the game was called due to rain. Kobel spent the entire 1974 season in the majors, compiling a 6–14 record and 3.99 ERA. He seemed to be at his best against the Yankees, as his ERA against the Yankees was 2.10, and three of those six wins were at their expense.

He developed arm troubles that limited him to 30 innings for the Triple-A Sacramento Solons in 1975. He remained a minor leaguer with the Brewers until receiving a second September call-up in 1976. Following a 1977 season spent in the minors, his contract was purchased by the New York Mets. He pitched parts of three seasons for the Mets, in which he went 12–18 with a 3.58 ERA. On June 17, 1980, he was traded to the Kansas City Royals for a player to be named later. He appeared in eight games for the Triple-A Omaha Royals. He joined Leones de Yucatán of the Mexican League in 1981. In 1982, he pitched briefly for the Pittsburgh Pirates' Triple-A affiliate, the Portland Beavers, and the Indios de Ciudad Juárez in Mexico.
