= Bruce Boisclair =

American baseball player (born 1952)

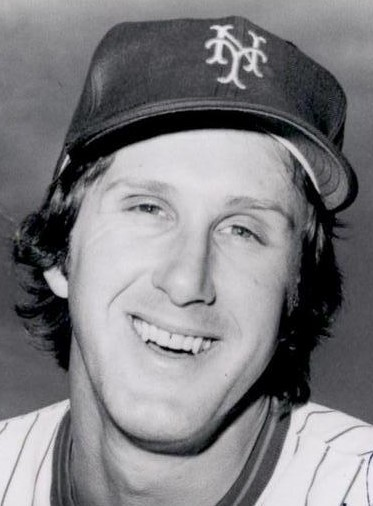
- Outfielder
- Born: December 9, 1952 (age 73); Putnam, Connecticut, U.S.
- Batted: Left Threw: Left

MLB debut
- September 11, 1974, for the New York Mets

Last MLB appearance
- September 30, 1979, for the New York Mets

MLB statistics
- Batting average: .263
- Home runs: 10
- Runs batted in: 77

NPB statistics
- Batting average: .249
- Home runs: 8
- Runs batted in: 26
- Stats at Baseball Reference

Teams
- New York Mets (1974–1979); Hanshin Tigers (1980)

Bruce Armand Boisclair (born December 9, 1952) is an American former Major League Baseball outfielder, who spent his entire major league career with the New York Mets from 1974 to 1979. He also played for the Hanshin Tigers of Nippon Professional Baseball in 1980.

== Killingly High School ==
Boisclair attended Killingly High School in Killingly, Connecticut, where he starred in football, basketball & baseball. Before being drafted by the New York Mets in the 20th round of the 1970 Major League Baseball draft, the tight end was expected to attend Boston College on a football scholarship.

== New York Mets ==
After five seasons in their farm system, where he batted .277 with twelve home runs and 150 runs batted in, Boisclair received a September call-up from the Mets in 1974. In a 25 inning marathon with the St. Louis Cardinals at Shea Stadium, Boisclar made his major league debut in the 23rd inning, pinch running for Duffy Dyer. He batted .250 with one RBI (against the Philadelphia Phillies) over the remainder of the season.

He failed to make the big league club out of Spring training 1975, and was assigned to the triple A Tidewater Tides, where he spent the entire season. He fared better in the spring of 1976, and won the fourth outfielder/left-handed bat off the bench job. He performed admirably in that role, batting .287 with two home runs & thirteen RBIs. He had a stellar .571 batting average & one home run as a pinch hitter.

He remained in that role for 1977, and batted .293 with four home runs, 44 RBIs and 21 doubles, all career bests. This played a part in the Mets' giving up on the Mike Vail experiment in the spring of 1978. He began the season platooning with right-handed free agent acquisition Elliott Maddox in right field, and hit a two run home run in his first start of the season. However, he batted just .222 in April, and soon found himself back in his familiar reserve role.

== Hanshin Tigers ==
He missed half of the 1979 season due to a wrist injury, and batted just .163 upon his return. He was released during spring training of 1980, and signed with the Hanshin Tigers for the 1980 season. He batted .246 with eight home runs and 26 RBIs, and enjoyed the only two home run game of his career in his only season in Japan.

He attempted to come back to Major League Baseball with the Toronto Blue Jays in 1981, but failed to make the club out of spring training.

== Career stats ==
Games	PA	AB	Runs	Hits	2B	3B	HR	RBI	SB	BB	HBP	SO	Avg.	OBP	Slg.	Fld%
410	1030	917	114	241	47	6	10	77	18	86	2	183	.263	.324	.360	.976

He batted .286 with two home runs, twelve RBIs and a .444 slugging percentage as a pinch hitter.

== Personal life ==
Bosclair & his wife, Delores, have two daughters, Erin & Britt. Erin became a nationally ranked tennis pro who won the Southern California Junior Championship when she was 13 years old (1993).
