= Dwight Bernard =

American baseball player (born 1952)

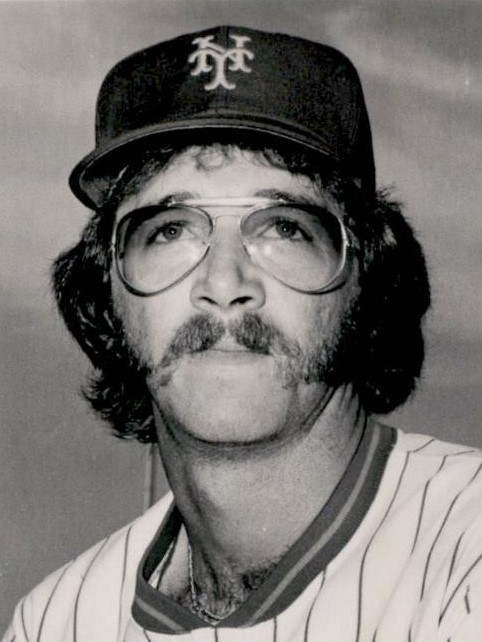
- Pitcher
- Born: May 31, 1952 (age 72); Mount Vernon, Illinois, U.S.
- Batted: Right Threw: Right

MLB debut
- June 29, 1978, for the New York Mets

Last MLB appearance
- October 2, 1982, for the Milwaukee Brewers

MLB statistics
- Win–loss record: 4–8
- Earned run average: 4.14
- Strikeouts: 92
- Stats at Baseball Reference

Teams
- New York Mets (1978–1979); Milwaukee Brewers (1981–1982)

Dwight Vern Bernard (born May 31, 1952) is an American former Major League Baseball pitcher who is currently a coach in the San Francisco Giants organization.

== Belmont University ==
After attending Mount Vernon Township High School, where he played basketball, the Mount Vernon, Illinois native traveled to Nashville, Tennessee to attend Belmont University. During his fourth season of college baseball with the Belmont Rebels, Bernard was named District Player of the Year in 1974. He currently ranks second in school history in earned run average at 2.18.

== New York Mets ==
Bernard was drafted by the New York Mets in the second round of the 1974 Major League Baseball draft. Over four seasons as a starting pitcher in their farm system Bernard went 28–40 with a 4.17 ERA. With the Tidewater Tides in 1978, Bernard was moved into the bullpen, and responded with a 1.64 ERA as a reliever to earn a call up to the majors.

Bernard made his major league debut on June 29, pitching one inning, and allowing one earned run against the Pittsburgh Pirates. He allowed just one earned run over his next five appearances, and made a spot start in the second game of a July 20 doubleheader with the Houston Astros. With the score tied at two, Bernard was pulled in the fifth inning after walking the first two batters. He earned his first career win on September 10 against the Pirates. It would turn out to be his only career win with the club, as he would go 1–7 with a 4.50 ERA over two seasons as a Met. Following the 1979 season, the Mets traded Bernard to the Milwaukee Brewers for fellow pitcher Mark Bomback.

== Milwaukee Brewers ==
After spending the entire 1980 and 1981 seasons in the minors, Bernard received a September call up to the Brewers in 1981, making five appearances. The Brewers went 31–22 in the second half of the strike shortened season to face the New York Yankees in the 1981 American League Division Series. Bernard made two appearances in the ALDS, pitching 2.1 innings without allowing a base runner.

He spent the full 1982 season in Milwaukee, and put together his finest season. On May 2, Bernard earned his first career save against the Minnesota Twins. He was 2–1 with a 4.50 ERA and the one save when the Brewers replaced manager Buck Rodgers with Harvey Kuenn. Under Kuenn, Bernard improved to 1–0 with a 3.26 ERA and five saves. Meanwhile, the Brewers improved to 72–43 to capture the American League East.

Bernard appeared in game one of the 1982 American League Championship Series and game six of the 1982 World Series, and did not allow a base runner in either appearance.

== Coaching career ==
Bernard was not able to carry his successful 1982 season into 1983. He was released during Spring training, and caught on with the Houston Astros. He went 4–0 with a 2.73 ERA and three saves for the Astros' triple A affiliate, the Tucson Toros in 1983, and 6–3 with a 4.57 ERA and two saves in 1984, but failed to crack the major league squad. He spent the 1985 season in the Baltimore Orioles' farm system before retiring, and going into coaching.

In 2006, Bernard became the pitching coach for the Triple-A Tacoma Rainiers, a minor league team for the Seattle Mariners. He was named pitching coach of the Class-A Clinton LumberKings of the Midwest League after the '09 season.

Bernard was let go by the Mariners organization after the 2013 season, then quickly hired by the San Francisco Giants as the pitching coach for their Sacramento River Cats minor league affiliate. As of 2019, Bernard was pitching coach of the Salem-Keizer Volcanoes.
