= Kerry Dineen =

American baseball player (1952-2015)

- Outfielder
- Born: July 1, 1952; Englewood, New Jersey, U.S.
- Died: November 21, 2015 (aged 63); Henderson, Nevada, U.S.
- Batted: Left Threw: Left

MLB debut
- June 14, 1975, for the New York Yankees

Last MLB appearance
- October 1, 1978, for the Philadelphia Phillies

MLB statistics
- Batting average: .324
- Home runs: 0
- Runs batted in: 2
- Stats at Baseball Reference

Teams
- New York Yankees (1975–1976); Philadelphia Phillies (1978)

Kerry Michael Dineen (July 1, 1952 – November 21, 2015) was an American professional baseball player. He played in Major League Baseball as an outfielder from 1975 to 1978 for the New York Yankees and the Philadelphia Phillies. He never appeared in more than seven games in any single season. Dineen is the first cousin of former big leaguer Ken Henderson.

Dineen attended the University of San Diego, where he played college baseball for the Toreros from 1971–73.

Dineen died of cancer in Henderson, Nevada, on November 21, 2015.
