= Roy Staiger =

American baseball player (born 1950)

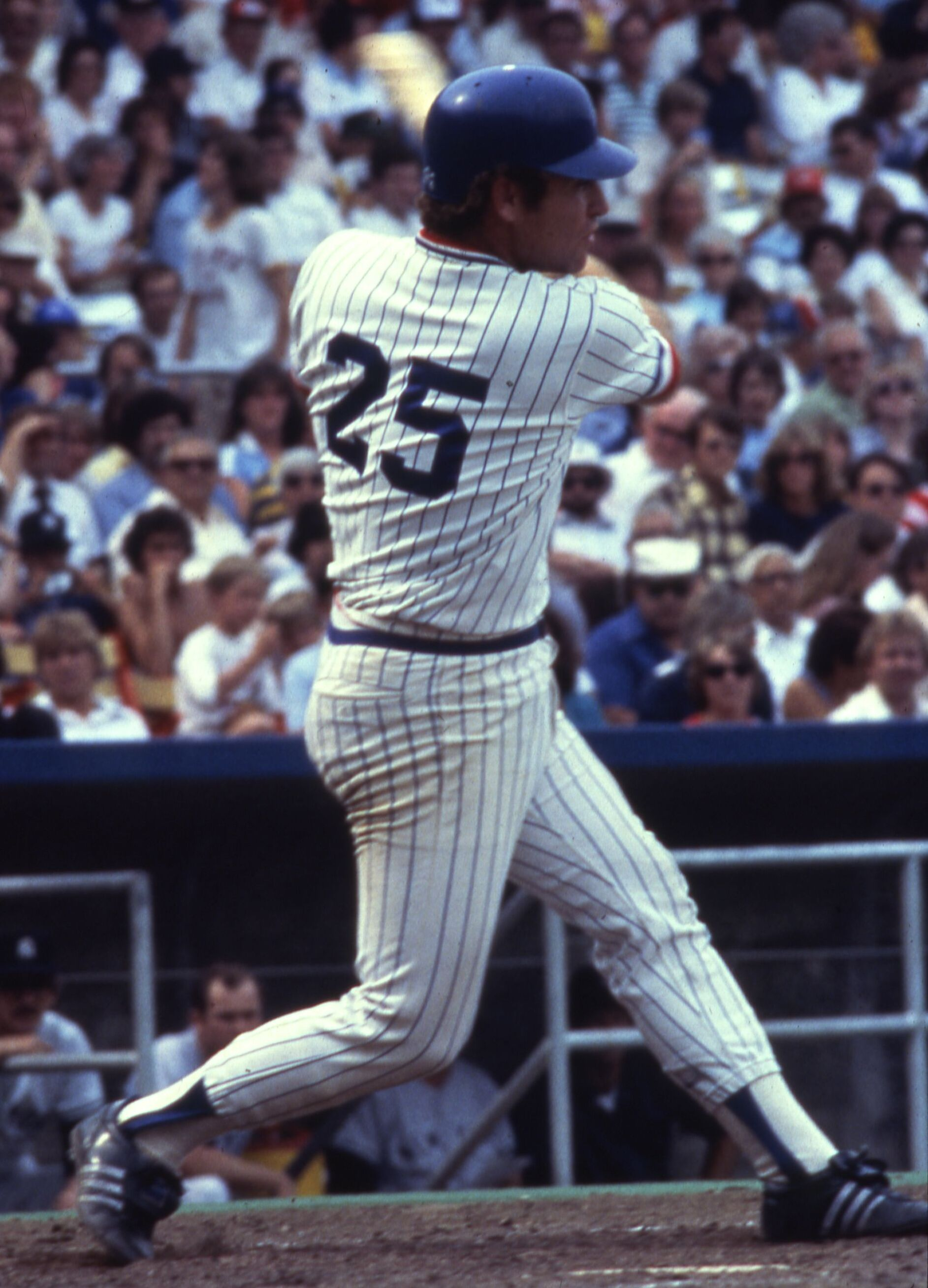
- Staiger with the Columbus Clippers in 1979
- Third baseman
- Born: January 6, 1950 (age 76); Tulsa, Oklahoma, U.S.
- Batted: Right Threw: Right

MLB debut
- September 12, 1975, for the New York Mets

Last MLB appearance
- September 23, 1979, for the New York Yankees

MLB statistics
- Batting average: .228
- Home runs: 4
- Runs batted in: 38
- Stats at Baseball Reference

Teams
- New York Mets (1975–1977); New York Yankees (1979)

Roy Joseph Staiger (born January 6, 1950) is an American former Major League Baseball third baseman. He was part of the first player trade between the New York Mets and New York Yankees that did not also involve a third team.

== Draft ==
Staiger was born and raised in Tulsa, Oklahoma, and was a standout athlete at Will Rogers High School. He attended Bacone College in nearby Muskogee, Oklahoma. He was drafted by the Los Angeles Dodgers in the fifteenth round of the 1969 Major League Baseball draft but did not sign. Seven months later, he was drafted by the New York Mets in the first round (24th overall) of the 1970 January Secondary Amateur Draft.

== Minor League career ==
After a subpar first season with the California League's Visalia Mets in 1970 (.239 avg., 7 HR, 34 RBI in 76 games), Staiger displayed the power that led the Mets to make him a first round pick his second season in Visalia. In 139 games, he clubbed 19 home runs and 18 doubles, while driving in 83 runs with a .282 batting average and .445 slugging percentage.

As a franchise, the Mets were notoriously unstable at third base throughout their brief history. Staiger's improved production prompted the Mets to use him, who had split the 1970 season pretty evenly between second, third and shortstop, primarily at third base in 1971. Likewise, he was used exclusively at third in 1972 with the double A Memphis Blues. Injuries limited Staiger to just 81 games, in which he hit three home runs and once again batted .282 with 38 runs batted in. His slugging percentage dropped to .379, and he registered an on-base percentage of .306.

Staiger spent the next three seasons stuck at triple A. In 1973, his first season with the International League's Tidewater Tides, he appeared in 136 games. He had a batting average of .249, a slugging percentage of .339 and an on-base percentage of .302. Although the Mets had several injuries to their infielders on the Major League team, Staiger was passed up in favor of other Tidewater infielders — Brian Ostrosser and Lute Barnes — and did receive time in the majors that season.

In 1974, he again played in 136 games, and improved his batting average to .272, his slugging percentage to .343 and his on-base percentage to .343. In his third consecutive season at Tidewater in 1975, he improved his batting average and slugging percentage again to .282 and .418, respectively. This earned Staiger a promotion to the Mets major league team that September.

== New York Mets ==
When Staiger made his major league debut on September 12, against the St. Louis Cardinals at Busch Stadium, he became the 50th third baseman in Mets history. He went 0-for-4 in his debut, however, the following day, he got his first major league hit, a double off Cards closer "The Mad Hungarian" Al Hrabosky, and scored his first major league run on a Mike Phillips single the next batter. He collected just two more hits, both singles, over the rest of the season, giving him three hits in nineteen at bats for a .158 batting average.

Staiger began the 1976 season in a platoon with Wayne Garrett at third until midway through the season, when Garrett was dealt to the Montreal Expos with Del Unser for Pepe Mangual and Jim Dwyer. At the time of the trade, Staiger was batting an even .200 with no home runs and six RBIs in 34 games, however, Mets manager Joe Frazier had managed Staiger at Tidewater the previous season, and believed in Staiger's ability to serve as the Mets' full-time third baseman. He showed modest improvement following the trade, batting .230 with 20 RBIs over the rest of the season. He hit his first career home run off Expos pitcher Woodie Fryman on August 2. Three days later, he hit his only other home run of the season off the Pittsburgh Pirates' Kent Tekulve.

After the 1977 Mets got off to a 15-30 start, Frazier was fired as manager, and replaced with player/manager Joe Torre. Under Frazier, Staiger was the Mets' starting third baseman, and batted .236 with two home runs and eight RBIs. Torre, however, favored Lenny Randle, acquired from the Texas Rangers earlier in the season. Staiger garnered just two more plate appearances before being demoted to Tidewater. In 73 games with Tidewater he batted .287 with 15 home runs to earn a call back up to the Mets that September. In fifteen at bats, he collected six hits, three RBIs and three runs scored.

== New York Yankees ==
Staiger was traded by the Mets to their cross-town rival New York Yankees for Sergio Ferrer at the Winter Meetings on December 9, 1977. Staiger spent the entire 1978 season with the Yankees' triple A affiliate, the Tacoma Yankees. Though he batted .283 with 19 home runs and 85 RBIs, it was not enough to earn him a call up to the World Series champions that September. He did, however, receive a brief call up to the Yankees in September 1979. In his second game as a Yankee, Staiger missed a hit and run call, resulting in a triple play. He appeared in four games for the Yankees, getting three hits in eleven at-bats. In 1980 Staiger played once again for the Columbus Clippers. After batting .234 in 90 games, he ended his professional baseball career.
