= Mardie Cornejo =

American baseball player (born 1951)

- Pitcher
- Born: August 5, 1951 (age 74); Wellington, Kansas, U.S.
- Batted: Right Threw: Right

MLB debut
- April 8, 1978, for the New York Mets

Last MLB appearance
- September 29, 1978, for the New York Mets

MLB statistics
- Win–loss record: 4–2
- Earned run average: 2.45
- Strikeouts: 17
- Stats at Baseball Reference

Teams
- New York Mets (1978)

Nieves Mardie Cornejo (born August 5, 1951 in Wellington, Kansas) is an American former professional baseball relief pitcher who played Major League Baseball (MLB) for the 1978 New York Mets. He is a member of the Kansas Baseball Hall of Fame.

His son, Nate Cornejo, played for the Detroit Tigers from 2001 to 2004.

== Draft history ==
Cornejo began his college career at Miami University before switching to the University of Tulsa (TU). He was first selected by the Washington Senators in the third round of the 1970 Major League Baseball January Draft, and again in the second round of the secondary phase of the 1970 draft, but did not sign. The Mets drafted him in the third round of the secondary phase of the 1971 amateur draft, and were also unable to sign him. He eventually signed with the Mets when they drafted him again in the 21st round of the 1973 amateur draft.

== MLB debut ==
Cornejo began his professional career as a starting pitcher, going 9-30 with a 4.06 earned run average in that role his first three seasons in the minors. He was moved into the bullpen for the 1976. He responded by going 17-12 with a 2.50 ERA & 15 saves over his next two seasons to earn a trip to Spring training in 1978.

Cornejo earned a spot in the Met's bullpen, and entered the second game of the season against the Montreal Expos in the eighth inning with the Expos leading 5–2. He pitched the final two innings without giving up a run. The Mets, meanwhile, scored two in the eighth and two in the ninth to earn the victory for Cornejo in his Major League debut. He took the mound again the next day, and earned his first career save.

Despite respectable numbers (3-2, 3.75 ERA, 2 saves), Cornejo was back in Tidewater by the end of May. He returned to the Mets in September, and pitched 12.2 innings without allowing an earned run to lower his ERA to 2.45 for the season.

== Detroit Tigers ==
Prior to the start of the 1979 season, he was traded to the Detroit Tigers for Ed Glynn. After one season with the Tigers' triple-A affiliate, the Evansville Triplets, Cornejo retired from baseball.
