= 1978 in baseball =

The following are the baseball events of the year 1978 throughout the world.

== Champions ==
=== Major League Baseball ===
- World Series: New York Yankees over Los Angeles Dodgers (4–2); Bucky Dent, MVP

League Championship Series (ALCS, NLCS)
East	NY Yankees	3
West	Kansas City	1
East	Philadelphia	1
West	Los Angeles	3

World Series
AL	NY Yankees	4
NL	Los Angeles	2

- American League Championship Series MVP: None
- National League Championship Series MVP: Steve Garvey
- All-Star Game, July 11 at San Diego Stadium: National League, 7–3; Steve Garvey, MVP

=== Other champions ===
- Amateur World Series: Cuba
- College World Series: USC
- Japan Series: Yakult Swallows over Hankyu Braves (4–3)
- Big League World Series: Taipei, Taiwan
- Little League World Series: Pin-Kuang, Pin-Tung, Taiwan
- Senior League World Series: Hualien, Taiwan

Winter Leagues

- 1978 Caribbean Series: Indios de Mayagüez
- Dominican Republic League: Águilas Cibaeñas
- Mexican Pacific League: Tomateros de Culiacán
- Puerto Rican League: Indios de Mayagüez
- Venezuelan League: Leones del Caracas

== Awards and honors ==
- Baseball Hall of Fame
  - Addie Joss
  - Eddie Mathews
  - Larry MacPhail (executive)

Baseball Writers' Association of America Awards
BBWAA Award	National League	American League
Rookie of the Year	Bob Horner (ATL)	Lou Whitaker (DET)
Cy Young Award	Gaylord Perry (SD)	Ron Guidry (NYY)
Most Valuable Player	Dave Parker (PIT)	Jim Rice (BOS)
Babe Ruth Award (World Series MVP)	—	Bucky Dent (NYY)
Gold Glove Awards
Position	National League	American League
Pitcher	Phil Niekro (ATL)	Jim Palmer (BAL)
Catcher	Bob Boone (PHI)	Jim Sundberg (TEX)
1st Base	Keith Hernandez (STL)	Chris Chambliss (NYY)
2nd Base	Davey Lopes (LAD)	Frank White (KC)
3rd Base	Mike Schmidt (PHI)	Graig Nettles (NYY)
Shortstop	Larry Bowa (PHI)	Mark Belanger (BAL)
Outfield	Garry Maddox (PHI)	Dwight Evans (BOS)
Outfield	Dave Parker (PIT)	Fred Lynn (BOS)
Outfield	Ellis Valentine (MON)	Rick Miller (CAL)

== Statistical leaders ==
	American League		National League	
Stat	Player	Total	Player	Total
AVG	Rod Carew (MIN)	.333	Dave Parker (PIT)	.334
HR	Jim Rice (BOS)	46	George Foster (CIN)	40
RBI	Jim Rice (BOS)	139	George Foster (CIN)	120
W	Ron Guidry (NYY)	25	Gaylord Perry (SD)	21
ERA	Ron Guidry (NYY)	1.74	Craig Swan (NYM)	2.43
K	Nolan Ryan (CAL)	260	J. R. Richard (HOU)	303

== Major league baseball final standings ==
=== American League final standings ===
AL East
Team	W	L	Pct.	GB	Home	Road
^{(1)} New York Yankees	100	63	.613	—	55‍–‍26	45‍–‍37
Boston Red Sox	99	64	.607	1	59‍–‍23	40‍–‍41
Milwaukee Brewers	93	69	.574	6½	54‍–‍27	39‍–‍42
Baltimore Orioles	90	71	.559	9	51‍–‍30	39‍–‍41
Detroit Tigers	86	76	.531	13½	47‍–‍34	39‍–‍42
Cleveland Indians	69	90	.434	29	42‍–‍36	27‍–‍54
Toronto Blue Jays	59	102	.366	40	37‍–‍44	22‍–‍58

AL West
Team	W	L	Pct.	GB	Home	Road
^{(2)} Kansas City Royals	92	70	.568	—	56‍–‍25	36‍–‍45
Texas Rangers	87	75	.537	5	52‍–‍30	35‍–‍45
California Angels	87	75	.537	5	50‍–‍31	37‍–‍44
Minnesota Twins	73	89	.451	19	38‍–‍43	35‍–‍46
Chicago White Sox	71	90	.441	20½	38‍–‍42	33‍–‍48
Oakland Athletics	69	93	.426	23	38‍–‍42	31‍–‍51
Seattle Mariners	56	104	.350	35	32‍–‍49	24‍–‍55

Locations of teams for the 1977–1981 American League seasons
West East

=== National League final standings ===
NL East
Team	W	L	Pct.	GB	Home	Road
^{(2)} Philadelphia Phillies	90	72	.556	—	54‍–‍28	36‍–‍44
Pittsburgh Pirates	88	73	.547	1½	55‍–‍26	33‍–‍47
Chicago Cubs	79	83	.488	11	44‍–‍38	35‍–‍45
Montreal Expos	76	86	.469	14	41‍–‍39	35‍–‍47
St. Louis Cardinals	69	93	.426	21	37‍–‍44	32‍–‍49
New York Mets	66	96	.407	24	33‍–‍47	33‍–‍49

NL West
Team	W	L	Pct.	GB	Home	Road
^{(1)} Los Angeles Dodgers	95	67	.586	—	54‍–‍27	41‍–‍40
Cincinnati Reds	92	69	.571	2½	49‍–‍31	43‍–‍38
San Francisco Giants	89	73	.549	6	50‍–‍31	39‍–‍42
San Diego Padres	84	78	.519	11	50‍–‍31	34‍–‍47
Houston Astros	74	88	.457	21	50‍–‍31	24‍–‍57
Atlanta Braves	69	93	.426	26	39‍–‍42	30‍–‍51

Locations of teams for the 1977–1992 National League seasons
West East

== Nippon Professional Baseball final standings ==
=== Central League final standings ===
Central League
Team	G	W	L	T	Pct.	GB
Yakult Swallows	130	68	46	16	.596	–
Yomiuri Giants	130	65	49	16	.570	3.0
Hiroshima Toyo Carp	130	62	50	18	.554	5.0
Yokohama Taiyo Whales	130	64	57	9	.529	7.5
Chunichi Dragons	130	53	71	6	.427	20.0
Hanshin Tigers	130	41	80	9	.339	30.5

=== Pacific League final standings ===
Pacific League
Team	G	W	L	T	Pct.	1st half ranking	2nd half ranking
Hankyu Braves	130	82	39	9	.678	1	1
Kintetsu Buffaloes	130	71	46	13	.607	2	2
Nippon-Ham Fighters	130	55	63	12	.466	3	4
Lotte Orions	130	53	62	15	.461	5	3
Crown Lighter Lions	130	51	67	12	.432	4	5
Nankai Hawks	130	42	77	11	.353	6	6

== Events ==
=== January ===
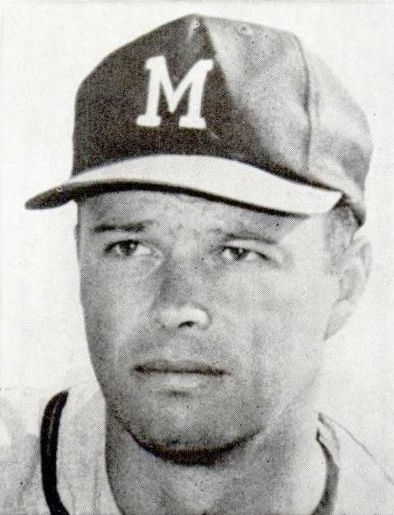
Eddie Mathews

- January 19 – Eddie Mathews, a 12-time All-Star third baseman who slugged 512 career homers over his 17-year career, is elected to the Hall of Fame by the Baseball Writers' Association of America on 301 of 379 ballots.
- January 20 – George Bamberger, who has spent the past decade as the highly successful pitching coach of the Baltimore Orioles, fills the Milwaukee Brewers' managerial vacancy, open since Alex Grammas' firing in November 1977. Bamberger, 54, has never managed before, but between 1968 and 1977, his Oriole staff included 18 twenty-game winners and helped win five American League East championships, three AL pennants, and the 1970 World Series.
- January 21 – The Texas Rangers sign first baseman Mike Jorgensen, who was granted free agency from the Oakland Athletics on October 30, 1977.
- January 25 – The San Diego Padres send southpaw Dave Tomlin and $125,000 to the Texas Rangers in return for veteran Gaylord Perry, who will win this year's National League Cy Young Award.
- January 31 – Commissioner of Baseball Bowie Kuhn voids the Oakland Athletics' trade of Vida Blue to the Cincinnati Reds, citing the "best interests of baseball" clause. As compensation, the A's send Doug Bair to the Reds for minor-league prospect Dave Revering on February 25.

=== February ===
- February 2 – The San Diego Padres sign veteran southpaw Mickey Lolich, 37, who was granted free agency from the New York Mets on January 5.
- February 3 – Nick Mileti sells the Cleveland Indians to a group headed by trucking industry magnate Francis "Steve" O'Neill, 78, who most recently was a limited partner in George Steinbrenner's New York Yankees ownership syndicate. O'Neill's group includes longtime executive Gabe Paul, who begins a second stint as the Indians' club president.
- February 8 – The Milwaukee Brewers reacquire power hitter Gorman Thomas from the Texas Rangers for cash. In 1978, Thomas, 27, who had failed an earlier, 1973–1976 audition with Milwaukee, will develop into an everyday centerfielder for the Brewers and bash 175 homers over the next five seasons.
- February 15 – Bob Howsam, general manager of the Cincinnati Reds since January 1967 and club president since March 1974, turns over both roles to longtime assistant Dick Wagner, 50. Howsam, two weeks shy of his 60th birthday, was Cincinnati's hard-nosed front-office boss during the "Big Red Machine" era; his clubs won five National League West titles, four National League pennants and two World Series (1975, 1976). He's known to be a firm opponent of the free agency era and its rising player salaries.
- February 17 – The Boston Red Sox sign veteran left-handed reliever Tom Burgmeier, 34, granted free agency from the Minnesota Twins on November 2, 1977.
- February 28:
  - The San Diego Padres trade first baseman Mike Ivie to the San Francisco Giants for versatile infielder Derrel Thomas. Ivie, 25, was the first overall pick in the June 1970 amateur draft.
  - The Texas Rangers trade left-hander and former Texas schoolboy sensation David Clyde, the first overall pick in the June 1973 draft, along with veteran outfielder Willie Horton, to the Cleveland Indians for pitcher Tom Buskey and outfielder John Lowenstein.

=== March ===
- March 6 – The Detroit Tigers acquire veteran right-hander Jack Billingham, 35, from the Cincinnati Reds for young lefty George Cappuzzello and minor-league outfielder John Valle.
- March 15:
  - The San Francisco Giants win the "Vida Blue Sweepstakes", obtaining the star southpaw from Charlie Finley's cross-bay Oakland Athletics in exchange for seven players and a cash payment of between $300,000 and $400,000. Commissioner Bowie Kuhn immediately says he will not block the transaction. The seven players traded by the Giants are pitchers Dave Heaverlo, Phil Huffman, John Henry Johnson and Alan Wirth, catcher Gary Alexander, infielder Mario Guerrero ("player to be named later") and outfielder Gary Thomasson. Blue will go 18–10 (2.79), make the National League All-Star team, and finish third in NL Cy Young Award balloting in 1978.
  - The Toronto Blue Jays make two deals: they send pitcher Dennis DeBarr to the Cleveland Indians for designated hitter Rico Carty; then they trade hurler Tom Bruno and cash to the St. Louis Cardinals for outfielder Rick Bosetti.
- March 17 – At Al Lopez Field in Tampa, Florida, the Cincinnati Reds host the New York Yankees in a spring training match-up wearing green uniforms in honor of St. Patrick's Day. In 1990, the Boston Red Sox become the second team to adopt this tradition.
- March 21 – With 17 days to go in spring training, the San Diego Padres fire manager Alvin Dark and replace him with Roger Craig, the club's pitching coach. It's Craig's first MLB managing opportunity.
- March 24 – The New York Mets trade veteran shortstop Bud Harrelson to the Philadelphia Phillies for second baseman Fred Andrews and cash. Harrelson, 33, has appeared in 1,322 games over 13 seasons in a Met uniform, and is a member of their 1969 World Series champions and 1973 National League pennant-winners.
- March 28 – Among the players who draw career-ending unconditional releases, as teams cut rosters to prepare for Opening Day, are pitcher Larry Dierker (released by the St. Louis Cardinals), designated hitter and 2025 Baseball Hall of Fame inductee Dick Allen (dropped by the Oakland Athletics), and second baseman Denny Doyle (cut by the Boston Red Sox).
- March 30:
  - The Boston Red Sox pull off a blockbuster trade, acquiring top-of-the-rotation starter Dennis Eckersley, 23, from the Cleveland Indians, along with backup catcher Fred Kendall, for pitchers Mike Paxton and Rick Wise, catcher Bo Díaz and third baseman Ted Cox. Eckersley will go 20–8 (2.99) for 1978 Red Sox.
  - The Oakland Athletics trade pitcher Pablo Torrealba to the Chicago White Sox for fellow hurler Steve Renko and catcher Jim Essian.

=== April ===
- April 1 – Starting off with a bang, Japanese star Sadaharu Oh hits a grand slam home run on opening day. It is his 757th home run.
- April 4:
  - The Kansas City Royals sell the contract of two-time American League All-Star first baseman John Mayberry to the Toronto Blue Jays.
  - The Pittsburgh Pirates reacquire veteran catcher Manny Sanguillén from the Oakland Athletics for pitcher Elias Sosa, outfielder Miguel Dilone and second baseman Mike Edwards ("PTBNL"). Sanguillén, 34, was a three-time National League All-Star during his previous term (1967, 1969–1976) with the Bucs.
- April 9 – Comeback hopeful Steve Busby, making his first major-league start since July 6, 1976, hurls 51/3 innings before being relieved and Darrell Porter drives in two runs as the Kansas City Royals top the Cleveland Indians, 5–4.
- April 13 – The New York Yankees defeat the Chicago White Sox 4–2 in their home opener on Reggie Candy Bar Day. Reggie Jackson slugs a 3-run home run in the first inning, and the field is showered with "Reggie Bar" candy bars which were given out free to the fans at the game.
- April 16 – The St. Louis Cardinals' Bob Forsch hurls a no-hitter in beating the Philadelphia Phillies 5–0. Forsch walks two and strikes out three in pitching the first home no-hitter by a Cardinal since Jesse Haines in 1924. His brother, the Houston Astros' Ken Forsch, will toss a no-hitter the following season against the Atlanta Braves – making them the first big-league brothers to each author a no-hitter.
- April 20 – With two out in the top of the fourth inning, the Atlanta Braves' Jeff Burroughs hits a ground ball up the middle that acrobatic San Diego Padres rookie shortstop Ozzie Smith dives for behind second base. The ball hits the base as he's airborne and caroms behind Smith. Although he's diving in the opposite direction, Smith reaches out with his bare hand, catches the ball, bounces up, and throws Burroughs out at first. The Padres win, 2–0. Future Hall of Famer Smith will earn the nickname "The Wizard of Oz."
- April 22 – Cleveland Indians first baseman Andre Thornton hits for the cycle in a 13–4 victory over the Boston Red Sox at Fenway Park.
- April 25 – The struggling, 6–11 St. Louis Cardinals fire second-year manager Vern Rapp. His permanent replacement, former Redbird star Ken Boyer, will take the helm of the club on April 29.
- April 27 – Willie McCovey drives in four runs and a double and his 496th home run in leading Vida Blue and the San Francisco Giants to a 5–3 win over the Atlanta Braves.
- April 29:
  - Pete Rose smashes three home runs in the Cincinnati Reds' 14–7 win over the New York Mets at Shea Stadium.
  - In Ken Boyer's debut as manager, the St. Louis Cardinals defeat the Los Angeles Dodgers 1–0. The game ties a record for quickest game in Cardinals history, lasting just one hour and thirty-three minutes.

=== May ===
- May 5 – Pete Rose singles off Montreal's Steve Rogers for career hit 3,000 and gets a hug at first base from former teammate Tony Pérez. The Montreal Expos beat the Cincinnati Reds 4–3.
- May 12 – At Royals Stadium, a potential game-ending routine fly ball becomes an Amos Otis walk-off inside-the-park home run as Reggie Jackson and Mickey Rivers collide in the outfield. The Kansas City Royals defeat the New York Yankees, 4–3. The misplay turns a sure Goose Gossage save into a sour loss for the current World Series champion Yankees.
- May 14:
  - With the Chicago Cubs losing 7–5 to the Los Angeles Dodgers, Dave Kingman hits a two-run home run with two outs in the ninth inning to send the game into extra innings. Kingman, who had also homered in the sixth, hits his third home run of the day in the fifteenth inning to give the Cubs a 10–7 victory over the Dodgers at Dodger Stadium, and end his day with eight RBIs. Following the game, Paul Olden, a reporter for Los Angeles radio station KLAC, asks Dodger manager Tommy Lasorda, "What's your opinion of Kingman's performance?" during his post-game interview. Lasorda goes off in a now-famous obscenity-laced tirade.
  - Bert Campaneris of the Texas Rangers recorded his 600th career stolen base in the second inning against the Baltimore Orioles. He became the 10th player to reach this mark.
- May 15 – The Minnesota Twins sign relief pitcher Mike Marshall, the 1974 National League Cy Young Award winner, who had been granted free agency from the Texas Rangers on November 9, 1977. In Minnesota, Marshall, 35, will reunite with manager Gene Mauch, for whom he starred with the Montreal Expos in 1972–1973, and become the Twins' bullpen ace.
- May 16:
  - The surprising Detroit Tigers improve to 20–9 on the season with a 16-inning, 4–2 home victory over the Seattle Mariners. Second-year catcher Lance Parrish's walk-off home run seals the win. Parrish, 21, is one of the Tigers' core of young players who have sparked a rejuvenation of the franchise after a difficult mid-1970s rebuilding program.
  - With his team in last place and suffering through its worst start since 1968, Chicago White Sox owner Bill Veeck trades Bobby Bonds to the Texas Rangers for outfielders Claudell Washington and Rusty Torres and a minor league player to be named later. Acquired in a high-profile trade from the California Angels the previous December, Bonds, 32, plays just 26 games in a White Sox uniform.
- May 17 – Oakland Athletics outfielder Bill North, a veteran of the club's 1973–1974 pennant- and World Series-winning teams, is traded to the Los Angeles Dodgers for Glenn Burke. North will become a free agent at the end of 1978 season.
- May 20 – At Olympic Stadium, Willie Stargell of the Pittsburgh Pirates hits two home runs off Wayne Twitchell in a 6–0 victory over the Montreal Expos. His second is a 535-foot shot in the fourth inning that lands in the upper deck – the only fair ball ever to be hit there.
- May 23:
  - After almost eight full months, the Boston Red Sox are finally sold—to a group now headed by former sole owner Jean R. Yawkey, ex-Red Sox catcher and front-office lieutenant Haywood Sullivan, and the club's former athletic trainer, Buddy LeRoux. The American League accepts the restructured deal, valued at $20.5 million, after it initially nixed Yawkey's attempt to sell the team to Sullivan and LeRoux for $15 million in September 1977; under that arrangement, the duo would have invested only $200,000 of their own capital and borrowed the rest to obtain a 52 percent share. With the retention of the wealthy Mrs. Yawkey in a leading ownership role, the sale (reportedly the highest price yet paid for a sports franchise in the U.S.) goes through.
  - With the Oakland Athletics leading the American League West division (24–15), manager Bobby Winkles walks off the job because of owner Charlie Finley's constant second-guessing. Jack McKeon, whom Winkles had replaced in the manager's chair on June 8, 1977, gets his old job back. It's Finley's 15th managerial change in his 18 years as owner.
- May 26 – The St. Louis Cardinals obtain outfielder George Hendrick from the San Diego Padres for pitcher Eric Rasmussen. Hendrick, 28, will become a two-time NL All-Star and Silver Slugger Award winner in his seven years in St. Louis.
- May 30 – In his National League debut, Silvio Martínez fires a complete game one-hitter as the Cardinals beat the New York Mets, 8–2. The only hit Martínez gives up is a two-run homer by Steve Henderson.

=== June ===
- June 1 – The Kansas City Royals trade pitcher Jim Colborn, an 18-game winner in 1977, to the Seattle Mariners for outfielder Steve Braun.
- June 2 – For the fourth time in five seasons, cowboy Gene Autry changes horses in midstream when his 25–21 California Angels fire manager Dave Garcia and replace him with former Angels' star shortstop Jim Fregosi. Between 1974 and 1978, only in 1975 did Autry keep the same manager (Dick Williams) in place all season; Fregosi, 36, is the team's seventh non-interim skipper in eight years. Released by the Pittsburgh Pirates the day before, he goes right from the active ranks to the manager's job. During his playing days with the Angels, 1961 to 1971, Fregosi made six American League All-Star teams. As their skipper, he pulls the Halos out of a losing skid and compiles a 62–54 mark through season's end; the club finishes 87–75, tied for second in the American League West, five games behind the Kansas City Royals.
- June 3 – Davey Johnson becomes the first major leaguer to hit two pinch-hit grand slams in a season, as the Philadelphia Phillies beat the Los Angeles Dodgers, 5–1.
- June 6 – In the 1978 Major League Baseball draft, slugging third baseman Bob Horner of the Arizona State Sun Devils is chosen first overall by the Atlanta Braves. In the second round of the same draft (48th overall), the Baltimore Orioles select Cal Ripken Jr., a shortstop out of Maryland's Aberdeen High School. Future Baseball Hall of Famer Ripken is then best known as the son and namesake of the Orioles' third-base coach.
- June 10 – The New York Yankees trade veteran left-hander Ken Holtzman to his original major league team, the Chicago Cubs, for 22-year-old righty Ron Davis, a prospect then pitching in Double-A. Davis will go 14–2 (2.85) with nine saves for the 1979 Yankees.
- June 14:
  - Pete Rose starts his 44-game hitting streak by collecting two hits in the Cincinnati Reds' 3–1 win over the Chicago Cubs.
  - The second-place New York Yankees add to their bench strength by acquiring veteran outfielder and pinch hitter Jay Johnstone from the Philadelphia Phillies for pitcher Rawly Eastwick. The Bombers also receive outfield prospect Bobby Brown in the transaction.
- June 15:
  - The high-flying Boston Red Sox, currently 42–19 and six games ahead of the New York Yankees in the American League East, subtract from their bench strength by selling the contract of reserve outfielder and ace left-handed pinch hitter Bernie Carbo to the Cleveland Indians. Red Sox left-hander Bill Lee protests the deal by staging a one-day walkout; he and Carbo are among of group of Red Sox players who've fallen out of favor with general manager Haywood Sullivan and manager Don Zimmer.
  - The Philadelphia Phillies reacquire right-handed pitcher and former top draft pick Dick Ruthven from the Atlanta Braves, straight up, for relief pitcher Gene Garber. Struggling so far with the downtrodden Braves, Ruthven, 27, will post a 13–5 record in 20 starts to help the Phillies win their third straight National League East championship in 1978.
  - The Houston Astros sell the contract of Roger Metzger, their longtime starting shortstop and a former Gold Glove Award winner, to the San Francisco Giants.
  - The New York Yankees continue to strengthen their roster, obtaining backup outfielder Gary Thomasson from the Oakland Athletics for infielder Mickey Klutts, outfielder Dell Alston and $50,000.
  - The Chicago Cubs trade outfielder Héctor Cruz to the San Francisco Giants for pitcher Lynn McGlothen. The Cubs also trade Joe Wallis to the Cleveland Indians for fellow outfielder Mike Vail.
  - Cleveland then sends Wallis to the Oakland Athletics for catcher/designated hitter Gary Alexander.
- June 16:
  - In a 12-season MLB career marked by near-misses — five one-hit games and eight two-hit games until today — Cincinnati's Tom Seaver finally hurls a no-hitter. The St. Louis Cardinals are the 4–0 victims as Seaver strikes out three batters, and walks three.
  - Fresh off the Arizona State University campus with no minor league experience, the Atlanta Braves' Bob Horner homers in his first major league game off Bert Blyleven of the Pittsburgh Pirates.

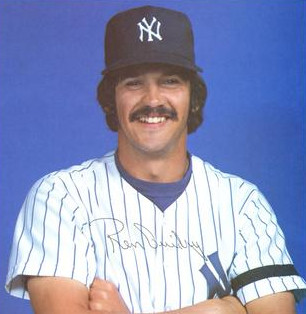
Ron Guidry

- June 17 – The New York Yankees' Ron Guidry strikes out 18 batters—15 in six innings—in a 4–0 shutout of the California Angels, setting an American League record for left-handers. The victory raises the southpaw's record to 11–0.
- June 26 – In only their second season, the 22–47 Toronto Blue Jays are world beaters—for one day—as they score 24 runs on 24 hits against a 40–30 Baltimore Orioles squad. The result is a football-like final score of 24–10 before 16,184 at Toronto's Exhibition Stadium.
- June 27 – Joe Rudi hits a pinch-hit grand slam homer in the seventh to help his California Angels knock the Kansas City Royals out of a tie for first place with a 5–4 Angels win.
- June 29 – Don Sutton sets a Los Angeles Dodgers career strikeout record, fanning Gary Matthews in the first inning for his 2,284th career K. He passes a Dodger record previously held by Don Drysdale in a 7–3 win over the Atlanta Braves.
- June 30:
  - Bill Veeck's 34–40 Chicago White Sox, in fifth place in the American League West but only 5½ games out of first, change managers, replacing current Baseball-Hall-of-Famer Bob Lemon with future Hall-of-Famer Larry Doby. Lemon is sacked despite having led the 1977 White Sox to a stellar 90–72 record. Doby becomes MLB's second black manager, after Frank Robinson, former skipper of the Cleveland Indians.
  - In the first game of a 10–9, 10–5 doubleheader loss to the Atlanta Braves at Fulton County Stadium, the San Francisco Giants' Willie McCovey hits his 500th career home run. With the blow, hit off Braves pitcher Jamie Easterly, McCovey becomes the 12th member of the 500th home run club. Giant Mike Ivie adds his second pinch grand slam of the year in the opener. San Francisco's Jack Clark socks three homers in the twin bill.

=== July ===
- July 1 – The Los Angeles Dodgers reacquire catcher/outfielder Joe Ferguson, whom they traded away in June 1976, obtaining him along with cash considerations from the Houston Astros in exchange for two "players to be named later": infielder Rafael Landestoy and outfield prospect Jeffrey Leonard.
- July 4 – At the unofficial halfway milestone of the regular season, there are tight races in three of MLB's four divisions. The San Francisco Giants lead their traditional enemies, the Los Angeles Dodgers (46–34), by two games in the National League West, with the Cincinnati Reds (46–35) only 2½ back. In the National League East, the two-time defending division champ Philadelphia Phillies (43–32) sport a four-game bulge over the Chicago Cubs (40–37). On the crowded American League West leaderboard, the California Angels (42–38) sit in first place, with every other club in the division, except the last-place Seattle Mariners, within six games of the top. However, the American League East race appears to be a runaway, with the Boston Red Sox (53–24) nine full games in front of the Milwaukee Brewers and New York Yankees (both 45–34).
- July 9 – The first dark cloud appears on the Boston Red Sox' 1978 horizon when shortstop Rick Burleson suffers an ankle injury. The AL All-Star will miss 17 games, and the Red Sox will win only six of them before Burleson returns to the lineup on July 28. Burleson's replacement, veteran Frank Duffy, makes three errors in today's game, a 7–1 loss to the Cleveland Indians; a .973 career fielder, Duffy cannot maintain that level of defense in 1978, posting a .929 mark in 21 games as Boston's backup shortstop.
- July 11 – At San Diego, the National League wins the All-Star Game over the American League, 7–3. Dodgers first baseman Steve Garvey earns the MVP trophy. Vida Blue starts for the NL, becoming the first pitcher to start for both leagues in the All-Star Game. Blue also started in 1971 and 1975 for the American League.
- July 13:
  - Jerry Koosman and Tom Seaver lock up for the second time since Seaver's trade to the Cincinnati Reds. Koosman and the Mets beat Seaver and the Reds, 4–2. Only one of the three runs Seaver gives up is earned.
  - Nolan Ryan of the California Angels and Steve Renko of the Boston Red Sox take no-hitters into the ninth inning of their respective games before both lose their no-hit bids. Ryan's Angels defeat the New York Yankees, 6–1, while Renko's Red Sox shut out the Oakland Athletics, 2–0.
- July 17:
  - The Kansas City Royals defeat the New York Yankees 9–7 in 11 innings, but the game is remembered for Reggie Jackson ignoring signs from third-base coach Dick Howser. With the score tied 5–5 in the bottom of the tenth and Thurman Munson on first, manager Billy Martin signals for Jackson to sacrifice bunt. Jackson makes a half-hearted attempt on the first pitch, and Martin removes the bunt sign. Jackson, however, then defies Martin and still attempts a bunt, popping out to the catcher. Jackson is suspended by Martin for five games.
  - In a Monday Night Baseball game televised nationally by ABC, the San Francisco Giants' Rob Andrews hits his first major league home run. The hit turns out to be the game-winning run in a 9–7 win over the St. Louis Cardinals. The game is only shown nationally because ABC's scheduled game between the Boston Red Sox and Minnesota Twins is long-delayed by rain.
- July 19 – The Yankees win the first of five straight games without the suspended Reggie Jackson, defeating the Minnesota Twins, 2–0, at Metropolitan Stadium.
- July 20 – Shortstop Chris Speier of the Montreal Expos hits for the cycle against the Atlanta Braves, going 4–4 with 6 RBI in a 7–3 win at Olympic Stadium.
- July 21:
  - As Reggie Jackson is returning from suspension, Billy Martin says in a post-game interview about Jackson and Yankee owner George Steinbrenner, "One's a born liar [referring to Jackson], and the other's convicted [Steinbrenner, referring to his 1974 conviction on charges of making illegal presidential campaign contributions]." Martin later appears on live television tearfully announcing his resignation from the Yankees, although some sources believe that Steinbrenner actually fired him. With the Yankees at 50–42 and 12 games behind the front-running Boston Red Sox, Steinbrenner names Bob Lemon manager for the remainder of the season; he'd been fired from the Chicago White Sox three weeks earlier.
  - Cleveland Indians starter Mike Paxton strikes out four batters in the fifth inning of an 11–0 win over the Seattle Mariners.
- July 24 – In Kansas City, an anguished Billy Martin announces his resignation as Yankees manager. At the time, the defending champion Yankees are 52–42 and 10 games behind the first-place Boston Red Sox in the American League East. Martin's resignation comes one day after he said of right fielder Reggie Jackson and owner George Steinbrenner, "The two of them deserve each other. One's a born liar, and the other's convicted." Bob Lemon is named manager, but third base coach Dick Howser fills in for Martin that evening against the Royals.
- July 26 – Cincinnati Reds catcher Johnny Bench hits his 300th career home run, a 2-run shot off the Mets' Nino Espinosa at Shea Stadium. The Reds lose, 12–3.
- July 27 – Minnesota Twins third baseman Mike Cubbage hits for the cycle in a 6–3 win over the Toronto Blue Jays at Metropolitan Stadium. Cubbage goes 4–4 with 4 RBI.
- July 29 – Before an Old Timers Day crowd of 46,711, Yankee Stadium announcer Bob Sheppard reveals that Billy Martin, who resigned as Yankees manager just five days earlier, will return as manager beginning in 1980, with Bob Lemon moving to the front office as GM. As it happens, the Yankees accelerate the timetable and Martin winds up taking over during the 1979 season.
- July 31 – The slumping Boston Red Sox defeat the Chicago White Sox, 9–2, at Fenway Park. It's only Boston's third win in their final 13 July games, and their American League East lead has shrunk from nine games on July 19 to five games (over the Milwaukee Brewers) today. The New York Yankees are third, 7½ back.

=== August ===
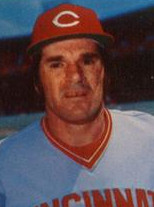
Pete Rose

- August 1 – The Atlanta Braves trounce the Cincinnati Reds, 16–4, and stop Pete Rose's hitting streak at 44 games. Larry McWilliams and Gene Garber are the Atlanta pitchers. Rose goes 0-for-4, including striking out in the 9th inning to end the game. Rose's streak is the second-longest in major league history. He goes 70-for-182 during the skein (a batting average of .385).
- August 2–3 – In a game played over successive nights in the Bronx, the first-place Boston Red Sox overcome an early, 5–0 deficit, tie the score at five, and battle the New York Yankees into extra innings. When a 1 a.m. curfew suspends the contest in the 15th frame, it resumes the next night. In the top of the 17th, Rick Burleson's two-run single gives Boston a 7–5 lead, and Bob Stanley holds the Yanks scoreless in the home half to deliver a Red Sox victory. The Red Sox also win a rain-shortened regularly scheduled game on August 3, 8–1, increasing their margin over the fourth-place Yankees to 8½ games. However, Boston will lose its next six games against its foes when the teams meet again in September.
- August 4 – Lou Brock of the St. Louis Cardinals breaks the all-time record for career stolen bases previously set by Billy Hamilton set in 1901, when he steals his 915th base in the third inning against the New York Mets.
- August 5 – At Old-Timers Day at Yankee Stadium, recently fired Billy Martin is announced as the Bombers' manager for the 1980 season.
- August 6 – Setting a record no batter wants, in the ninth inning of an important game, future Baseball Hall of Fame slugger Willie Stargell strikes out for the 1,711th time, breaking the major-league record for Ks by a hitter previously held by Mickey Mantle. Stargell's strikeout comes in the ninth inning of a 3–2 loss to the Philadelphia Phillies.
- August 10 – Ron Guidry fires a three-hitter to become the American League's first 16-game winner this year, and Chris Chambliss knocks in four runs with a single and a double, leading the New York Yankees to their fifth straight win, a 9–0 triumph over the Milwaukee Brewers. Now in second place, the Yankees (64–49) trail the Boston Red Sox (71–41) by 7½ games in the American League East.
- August 15 – The Toronto Blue Jays trade designated hitter Rico Carty to the Oakland Athletics for pitcher Phil Huffman and DH Willie Horton. Carty, 38, is in the process of slugging 31 homers in his next-to-last MLB season.
- August 20 – Before the Los Angeles Dodgers' game against the New York Mets, Steve Garvey and Don Sutton engage in a clubhouse fistfight over sardonic comments made by Sutton in an interview with The Washington Post describing Garvey as the "All-American boy".
- August 25 – A one-day strike by the Major League Umpires Association causes amateur arbiters (and two MLB coaches, Jerry Zimmerman of the Minnesota Twins and Don Leppert of the Toronto Blue Jays) to officiate today's 14 MLB games. A federal judge based in Philadelphia then enjoins the union from staging a longer walk-out to protest pay and working conditions. The abortive work stoppage is a prelude to the 1979 Major League umpires strike, which will last from March 7 to May 17.
- August 31:
  - Joe Morgan, George Foster and Johnny Bench hit home runs to help the Cincinnati Reds snap a six-game losing streak via 12–6 win over the St. Louis Cardinals. Tom Seaver goes seven innings for the win and reliever Tom Hume gave a ninth inning grand slam by Wayne Garrett.
  - The Cleveland Indians trade outfielder Johnny Grubb to the Texas Rangers for two "players to be named later": pitcher Bobby Cuellar and minor-league outfielder Dave Rivera.

=== September ===
- September 3 – in Pittsburgh, Willie Stargell collects his 2,000th career hit against Craig Skok of the Braves in the ninth inning. Dale Berra homers in the ninth and the Pirates win 6–3.
- September 5 – The Montreal Expos defeat the Chicago Cubs 10–8 in a 9-inning game that sees a Major-League record 45 players participate.
- September 7 – The "Boston Massacre" begins. The Boston Red Sox enter today's opening game of a four-game series in Boston with a four-game lead over the New York Yankees; a lead which had been fourteen games just weeks earlier. The Yankees defeat the Red Sox 15–3, and go on to sweep the series with 13–2, 7–0, and 7–4 victories. The Yankees outscore the Red Sox 42 to 9, and erase the Red Sox lead in the American League East division, leading the division for the first time all season.
- September 14 – Thirty-nine-year-old Atlanta Braves pitcher Jim Bouton earns his 62nd and final big league victory (and first since 1970), a 4–1 win over the San Francisco Giants. Bouton is best known as the author of the baseball diary Ball Four. His win over the Giants comes four days after his first start against the Los Angeles Dodgers in which he was hit hard for six hits and six runs over five innings. The Giants were vocal with their displeasure over the Braves using Bouton in the Dodger game because they were still in a tight division race with their arch-rivals, only to lose to him in this, his very next start.
- September 15 – The Los Angeles Dodgers become the first team in major league history to draw 3 million fans in a season.
- September 20 – The Yankees' Ron Guidry suffers his third and final loss in a stellar 25–3, Cy Young Award-winning season. The Yankees are defeated by the Toronto Blue Jays with left-hander Mike Willis the winning pitcher. All three of Guidry's losses in 1978 were to left-handers named "Mike": Caldwell, Flanagan, and Willis.
- September 22:
  - Third baseman Butch Hobson, still in the Boston Red Sox' lineup despite crippling bone chips in his right elbow, commits his record-setting 43rd error of the 1978 season. His miscue leads to two unearned runs, as the Red Sox fall 5–4 to the Toronto Blue Jays and remain two games behind the New York Yankees in the American League East race. Manager Don Zimmer finally replaces Hobson and makes utilityman Jack Brohamer his starting third baseman on September 23. The Red Sox then win eight games in a row to force the 1978 American League East tie-breaker game on October 2.
  - Ralph Houk, 59, manager of the Detroit Tigers since 1974, announces his retirement after five years at the helm. Houk supervised the rebuilding of the Tigers on the field: in 1975, they went 57–102; this season, their record will be 86–76 with their roster featuring some of the brightest young stars in baseball. Former MLB catcher Les Moss, the highly successful, 53-year-old manager of the Tigers' Triple-A Evansville affiliate, is named Houk's successor.
- September 23–24 – California Angels outfielder and marquee free-agent signing Lyman Bostock, 27, is shot on the night of the 23rd while riding in a car with his uncle and several others following a dinner party in Gary, Indiana, dying two hours later in the early morning of the 24th. The estranged husband of a female passenger pulls alongside Bostock's uncle's car and fires a single shotgun blast into the vehicle, inflicting fatal head wounds on the Angels' star. The shooter is ultimately acquitted by reason of insanity.
- September 24 – Ron Guidry of the New York Yankees ties an American League record for left-handed pitchers with his ninth shutout of the season, blanking the Cleveland Indians, 4–0. The record was set by Red Sox southpaw Babe Ruth in 1916.
- September 28 – Houston Astros pitcher J. R. Richard fans Bruce Benedict of the Atlanta Braves for his 303rd strikeout of the season, setting the National League single-season record for strikeouts by a right-handed pitcher.
- September 30:
  - The Philadelphia Phillies overcome a first-inning grand slam by Willie Stargell to beat the host Pittsburgh Pirates, their in-state rivals, 10–8, to clinch their third straight National League East Title. Winning pitcher Randy Lerch contributes two home runs to his cause. The loss snaps the Pirates' streak of 24 straight wins at Three Rivers Stadium.
  - With one game left in the season, volatile Texas Rangers owner Brad Corbett fires manager Billy Hunter and replaces him with coach Pat Corrales. Hunter had turned down a five-year contract extension offered by Corbett a few weeks earlier. The Rangers are 86–75, second in the American League West and five games behind the division champion Kansas City Royals.

=== October ===
- October 1:
  - Led by home runs from Rick Burleson and Jim Rice, and Luis Tiant's two-hit pitching, the Boston Red Sox shut out the Toronto Blue Jays 5–0 at Fenway Park, closing out the regular season with an eight-game winning streak. They will have to play a one-game playoff at Fenway the very next day against the New York Yankees, whom they had led by as many as 14 games in July, as the Cleveland Indians and Rick Waits defeat the Yankees 9–2 at Yankee Stadium. News of the Indians' victory is announced on Fenway Park's video screen with the words "THANK YOU, RICK WAITS – GAME TOMORROW." His brilliant two-hitter comes in what will be Tiant's final appearance in a Red Sox uniform.
  - Gaylord Perry of the San Diego Padres records his 3,000th career strikeout when he fans Joe Simpson of the Dodgers in the eighth inning of a Padres' 4–3 victory.

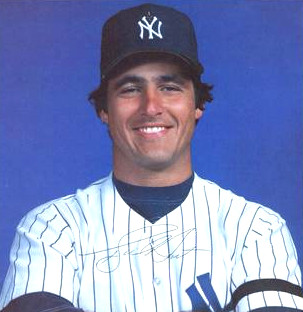
Bucky Dent

- October 2 – Bucky Dent's crucial 7th-inning home run helps the New York Yankees beat the Boston Red Sox, 5–4, in a one-game playoff for the American League East title. It is another defining moment in the Yankees – Red Sox rivalry. With Kansas City, Los Angeles and Philadelphia also having won their divisions, all four defending division winners repeat. Ron Guidry closes out the year with a 25–3 record, but not before giving up a home run to Carl Yastrzemski—the only one he will allow to a left-handed hitter all season
- October 3 – Three-time former All-Star outfielder Bobby Bonds changes addresses again when the Texas Rangers trade him, along with pitcher Len Barker, to the Cleveland Indians for pitcher Jim Kern and infielder Larvell Blanks. After spending his first seven seasons with the San Francisco Giants, Bonds has now been traded five times in less than four calendar years.
- October 4 – Steve Garvey smashes two home runs and a triple to pace the Los Angeles Dodgers to a 9–5 win over the Philadelphia Phillies in the opener of the National League Championship Series. Davey Lopes and Steve Yeager also homer at Veterans Stadium.
- October 6 – The Yankees overcome three home runs by the Royals' George Brett to win Game 3 of the American League Championship Series, 6–5, and take a 2 games to 1 series lead.
- October 7:
  - The Los Angeles Dodgers win the National League Championship Series, three games to one, with a 4–3 home victory over the Philadelphia Phillies. Bill Russell's 10th-inning, two-out single scores Ron Cey with the winning run. A walk to Cey and a routine liner that Garry Maddox muffs in center field sets up Russell's game-winner. Dusty Baker collects four hits for the Dodgers.
  - For the third straight year, the New York Yankees defeat the Kansas City Royals in the American League Championship Series, also three games to one. In their Game 4, 2–1 clinching victory, Ron Guidry goes eight innings for his second win of the ALCS, and Goose Gossage nails down the save. Roy White's sixth-inning homer provides the winning run. The Yankees and Dodgers will thus meet for the second straight year in the World Series—their tenth such clash since 1941.
- October 10:
  - Shortly before the start of game one of the world series, the Los Angeles Dodgers hold a special ceremony where the franchise retires the number 19 in honor of one of the team coaches, Jim Gilliam, who died suddenly from a massive brain hemorrhage two days prior to the start of the series. Gilliam becomes the first non hall-of-fame member of the Dodgers to receive this honor.
  - The World Series, a rematch from last season, begins at Dodger Stadium. Davey Lopes belts 2 home runs and drives in 5 runs to lead the Dodgers to an 11–5 win over the Yankees.
- October 11 – The Dodgers take a 2–0 lead in the World Series with a 4–3 win in Game 2. The Dodgers' Ron Cey and the Yankees' Reggie Jackson drive in all the runs for their respective teams. Bob Welch saves the win for Burt Hooton in dramatic fashion, putting two runners on before striking out Jackson for the final out.
- October 13 – The World Series moves to Yankee Stadium, where the Yankees win their first game of the Series, 5–1, behind the mastery of Ron Guidry and defensive prowess of Graig Nettles.
- October 14 – The Yankees even the Series with the Dodgers 2–2 when Lou Piniella's 10th-inning single scores Roy White with the winning run in a 4–3 Yankees victory.
- October 15 – The Yankees move one win from clinching the World Series with a 12–2 rout of the Dodgers. Thurman Munson drives in 5 runs and Roy White contributes 3.
- October 17 – At Dodger Stadium, the New York Yankees win their fourth straight game, 7–2, to clinch their second consecutive World Series over the Los Angeles Dodgers. Yankees shortstop Bucky Dent is named Series MVP, batting .417 with 10 hits, 7 RBI, and 3 runs scored.
- October 18:
  - The St. Louis Cardinals fire general manager Bing Devine, 62, and replace him with former Redbird executive John Claiborne, 38. Devine was a major architect of the Cardinals' mid-1960s three-time pennant-winners and 2x World Series champions, but in 1978 his club fell to a 69–93 record, their worst in over a half-century.
  - John J. McHale, president/CEO of the Montreal Expos since the team's founding in 1968, adds additional responsibilities when he also becomes the Expos' general manager. McHale, 57, succeeds Charlie Fox as the third GM in franchise history.
- October 19 – The Chicago White Sox change managers again, replacing Larry Doby, who led them to a 37–50 record from July 1 through the end of the 1978 campaign, with shortstop Don Kessinger, 36, who will be a player-manager. It's Bill Veeck's fourth managerial change in less than three years as owner of the White Sox.
- October 25:
  - The San Diego Padres' Gaylord Perry (21–6, 2.73) is named winner of the 1978 National League Cy Young Award; the 40-year-old veteran, who won the 1972 AL Cy Young Award with the Cleveland Indians, becomes the first pitcher to earn the award in each major league.
  - The Padres trade third baseman Dave Roberts, outfielder Oscar Gamble and $300,000 to the Texas Rangers for catcher Bill Fahey, first baseman Mike Hargrove and infielder Kurt Bevacqua.
- October 27 – George Bamberger of the Milwaukee Brewers is named the United Press International American League Manager of the Year. He guided the Brewers to 93 triumphs and the Brewers' first winning season. Bamberger receives 20 first-place votes to nine for Bob Lemon of the New York Yankees.

=== November ===
- November 1 – Ron Guidry of the New York Yankees is named winner of the American League Cy Young Award by a unanimous vote, taking all 28 first-place tallies.
- November 2 – Thirty-eight players are granted free agency after playing out their contracts, including Pete Rose, Tommy John and Luis Tiant.
- November 6 – Pitcher Andy Messersmith, the co-plaintiff with Dave McNally in the 1975 arbitration case that led to the Seitz decision and free agency, is unconditionally released by the New York Yankees. He will return to the Los Angeles Dodgers, the team he took to arbitration in the Seitz case, as a free agent in February 1979 and finish his career there.

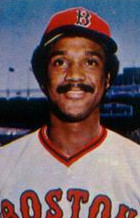
Jim Rice

- November 7 – Jim Rice of the Boston Red Sox, who led his league in almost every offensive category (including hits, triples, home runs, runs batted in, slugging percentage, OPS, and total bases), is rewarded by being selected American League MVP.
- November 10 – In a ten-player transaction, the New York Yankees send former Cy Young Award winner Sparky Lyle along with Mike Heath, Larry McCall, Dave Rajsich, Domingo Ramos and cash consideration to the Texas Rangers, in exchange for Juan Beníquez, Mike Griffin, Paul Mirabella, Dave Righetti and minor-leaguer Greg Jemison. Righetti, considered the top left-handed pitching prospect in the minors, will win AL Rookie of the Year honors in 1981.
- November 13:
  - Pitcher Luis Tiant, famed as "El Tiante" when he won 122 games with the Boston Red Sox since joining them in 1971, signs as a free agent with the Red Sox's dreaded rivals, the New York Yankees.
  - Left-hander Larry Gura, who was granted free agency November 2, decides to return to his 1978 team, the Kansas City Royals. Gura had gone 16–4 (2.72) this past season, and he'll post two 18-win seasons for the Royals in 1980 and 1982.
- November 16 – Future Baseball Hall of Fame inductee and Pittsburgh Pirates right-fielder Dave Parker, already a Gold Glove recipient, now wins the 1978 National League Most Valuable Player Award with 21 of 24 first-place votes.
- November 21 – The New York Yankees sign free-agent left-hander Tommy John, formerly with the Los Angeles Dodgers.
- November 22 – Detroit Tigers second baseman Lou Whitaker wins the American League Rookie of the Year Award with 21 of 28 first places votes over future Hall-of-Famer Paul Molitor of the Milwaukee Brewers.
- November 27:
  - The Houston Astros acquire catcher Alan Ashby from the Toronto Blue Jays for pitcher Mark Lemongello, third baseman Pedro Hernández and outfielder Joe Cannon. Ashby will play for the Astros for 11 seasons and later become a member of their broadcast team.
  - The Baltimore Orioles obtain outfielder John Lowenstein on waivers from the Texas Rangers. Lowenstein, 31, will play a key role on two American League pennant-winning teams, including the Orioles' 1983 World Series champions.
- November 28 – The Cincinnati Reds dismiss their nine-year, Cooperstown-bound manager, Sparky Anderson, who has refused his front office's demand that he overhaul his coaching staff. Since 1970, Anderson has led the Reds to five National League West titles, four National League pennants, two World Series championships (1975–1976), and averaged 96 wins per season. Cincinnati appoints John McNamara as Anderson's successor the same day; McNamara, 46, is the former skipper of the Oakland Athletics (1969–1970) and San Diego Padres (1974–1977).
- November 29 – The Baltimore Orioles sign veteran right-hander Steve Stone, who had been granted free agency from the Chicago White Sox. In Baltimore, Stone, 31, will win 25 games and the 1980 American League Cy Young Award before beginning his long broadcasting career.

=== December ===
- December 4:
  - The Detroit Tigers obtain right-hander Aurelio López and outfielder Jerry Morales from the St. Louis Cardinals for two left-handers, Bob Sykes and minor-leaguer John Murphy. López, 30, will earn the nickname "Señor Smoke" coming out of the Detroit bullpen, and play a key role on the Tigers' 1984 world championship team.
  - The California Angels trade first baseman Ron Jackson and designated hitter Danny Goodwin to the Minnesota Twins for outfielder Dan Ford.
- December 5:
  - The Philadelphia Phillies sign free-agent Pete Rose to a four-year, $3.2 million contract after he plays out his contract with his hometown team, the Cincinnati Reds. Rose is expected to become the Phillies' regular first baseman in 1979.
  - Free-agent third baseman Darrell Evans decides to remain with the San Francisco Giants, signing a five-year, $1.44 million contract.
  - The Toronto Blue Jays acquire shortstop prospect Alfredo Griffin, along with minor-league first baseman Phil Lansford, from the Cleveland Indians for pitcher Víctor Cruz. Griffin, 21, will win the 1979 American League Rookie of the Year Award and spend six seasons as Toronto's starting shortstop.
  - The New York Mets acquire left-hander Pete Falcone from the St. Louis Cardinals for pitcher Kim Seaman and outfielder Tom Grieve. Falcone is a cousin of Mets' bullpen coach Joe Pignatano.
- December 6 – The Philadelphia Phillies trade outfield prospect "Super Joe" Charboneau to the Cleveland Indians for pitcher Cardell Camper. Charboneau will win the 1980 American League Rookie of the Year Award.
- December 7 – Purging another discontented player via another one-sided trade, the Boston Red Sox send veteran left-hander Bill "Spaceman" Lee to the Montreal Expos for utility infielder Stan Papi. Lee—at odds with Boston management, especially skipper Don Zimmer—is a three-time 17-game winner with the Red Sox. He wins 16 games for Montreal in 1979. Papi plays 51 games in a Red Sox uniform and bats .188.
- December 8:
  - The New York Mets trade pitcher Jerry Koosman to the Minnesota Twins for minor league pitcher Greg Field and a player to be named later. The trade leaves Ed Kranepool as the last remaining member of the ″Miracle Mets″ team that won the 1969 World Series. The Twins will complete the trade by sending Jesse Orosco to the Mets on February 7, 1979.
  - Two of the American League's top third basemen change teams, when the Cleveland Indians trade Buddy Bell to the Texas Rangers for Toby Harrah in a one-for-one transaction.
  - The Seattle Mariners deal their 25-year-old All-Star shortstop, Craig Reynolds, to the Houston Astros for left-hander Floyd Bannister, 23. Both Reynolds and Bannister will become All-Stars in their respective new leagues.

== Movies ==
- A Love Affair: The Eleanor and Lou Gehrig Story (TV)
- The Bad News Bears Go to Japan
- One in a Million: The Ron LeFlore Story (TV)

== Births ==
=== January ===
- January 3 – Delvin James
- January 4:
  - Chris Gissell
  - Willie Martínez
- January 6 – Casey Fossum
- January 7 – Kevin Mench
- January 11 – Greg Aquino
- January 12 – Luis Ayala
- January 16 – Alfredo Amézaga
- January 17 – Mark Malaska
- January 18 – Brian Falkenborg
- January 19 – Wilton Veras
- January 20:
  - Chris Mears
  - John Rodriguez
- January 22 – Chone Figgins
- January 25 – Derrick Turnbow
- January 26:
  - Esteban Germán
  - Steve Green
  - Andrés Torres
- January 27:
  - Ángel Berroa
  - Pete Laforest
- January 28 – Tomás de la Rosa
- January 30 – John Patterson

=== February ===
- February 1:
  - Erick Almonte
  - Dusty Bergman
- February 5 – Devern Hansack
- February 6:
  - Steve Andrade
  - Adam Shabala
- February 7 – Endy Chávez
- February 10:
  - Cedrick Bowers
  - Rubén Mateo
- February 11 – Brent Butler
- February 12 – Tim Redding
- February 13 – Scott Dohmann
- February 21 – René Reyes
- February 23 – Luke Prokopec
- February 24:
  - Steve Torrealba
  - DeWayne Wise
- February 28 – Brian Reith

=== March ===
- March 1:
  - Ken Harvey
  - Kris Keller
- March 2 – Jared Sandberg
- March 3 – Matt Diaz
- March 4 – Rodrigo Rosario
- March 5 – Mike Hessman
- March 9 – Mike Neu
- March 11 – Kevin Reese
- March 14 – Matt Kata
- March 18 – Kasey Olemberger
- March 20 – Mike Bynum
- March 21:
  - Jeff Bajenaru
  - Cristian Guzmán
- March 22 – Jeremy Griffiths
- March 24 – José Valverde
- March 27 – Dee Brown
- March 29 – Eric Bruntlett
- March 30 – Josh Bard

=== April ===
- April 2 – John Gall
- April 3 – Bobby Hill
- April 4 – Jason Ellison
- April 5 – Brandon Backe
- April 6 – Blaine Neal
- April 11 – Josh Hancock
- April 15:
  - Milton Bradley
  - Tim Corcoran
- April 21 – Jack Taschner
- April 26 – Joe Crede
- April 27 – Runelvys Hernández
- April 29 – Tony Armas Jr.

=== May ===
- May 9 – Aaron Harang
- May 12 – Josh Phelps
- May 13:
  - Ryan Bukvich
  - Barry Zito
- May 15:
  - Clayton Andrews
  - Guillermo Rodríguez
- May 16 – Nick Bierbrodt
- May 17:
  - John Foster
  - Carlos Peña
- May 18 – Marcus Giles
- May 20 – Wilson Valdez
- May 21 – Ricardo Rodríguez
- May 23:
  - Scott Dunn
  - Mike González
  - Chris Sampson
- May 24:
  - Dave Pember
  - Brad Penny
- May 25:
  - Travis Hughes
  - Mike Vento
- May 30 – Rico Washington

=== June ===
- June 3 – Steve Smyth
- June 5 – Travis Chapman
- June 6 – Jaime Bubela
- June 7 – Donaldo Méndez
- June 10 – Carlos Rivera
- June 14 – Edgar Gonzalez
- June 15 – Zach Day
- June 17 – Dernell Stenson
- June 19 – Claudio Vargas
- June 20:
  - Kevin Gregg
  - Bobby Seay
- June 21 – Luis Rivera
- June 22:
  - Anthony Ferrari
  - Willie Harris
- June 25:
  - Aramis Ramírez
  - Luke Scott
- June 27 – Oscar Salazar
- June 29:
  - Trey Hodges
  - Joe Inglett

=== July ===
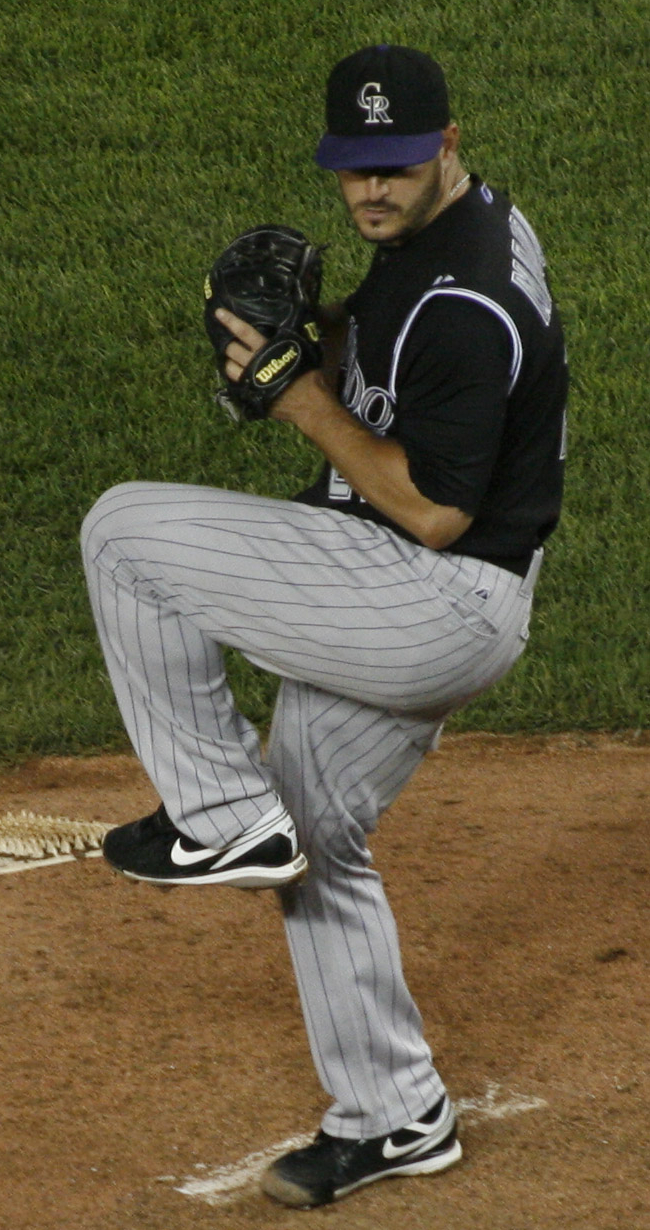
All-Star Jason Marquis

- July 2 – Greg Dobbs
- July 3 – Juan Rivera
- July 10 – Sam Marsonek
- July 13 – Ryan Ludwick
- July 14 – Mike Burns
- July 15 – Miguel Olivo
- July 16 – Jorge Vásquez
- July 17 – Jason Jennings
- July 18 – Ben Sheets
- July 19:
- Yorvit Torrealba
- Steve Watkins
- July 21 – Willie Eyre
- July 29 – Mike Adams

=== August ===
- August 1 – Tim Olson
- August 2 – Matt Guerrier
- August 4:
  - Luke Allen
  - Jon Knott
- August 5 – Jamal Strong
- August 8:
  - Alexis Gómez
  - Brian Sanches
- August 10 – Jorge Campillo
- August 11 – Eric Crozier
- August 12 – Michel Hernández
- August 15 – Santiago Ramírez
- August 16 – Brian Gordon
- August 17 – Chad Qualls
- August 18:
  - Kevin Barry
  - Matt Hensley
- August 19:
  - Eude Brito
  - Chris Capuano
- August 20:
  - Chris Schroder
  - T. J. Tucker
- August 21:
  - Lee Gronkiewicz
  - Jason Marquis
- August 29 – Ed Rogers
- August 30:
  - Cliff Lee
  - Todd Wellemeyer
- August 31 – Tim Drew

=== September ===
- September 1 – Stephen Smitherman
- September 3 – Juan Pérez
- September 4 – Nick Regilio
- September 5 – Matt Watson
- September 6:
  - Frank Brooks
  - Alex Escobar
- September 8 – Gil Meche
- September 9 – Kurt Ainsworth
- September 10 – Nick Green
- September 11 – Junior Herndon
- September 14 – Carlos Torres
- September 18 – Wilkin Ruan
- September 19 – Nick Johnson
- September 20 – Jason Bay
- September 25 – Joel Piñeiro
- September 27 – Jon Rauch
- September 28 – Joey Nation

=== October ===
- October 3 – Steve Kent
- October 4 – Kyle Lohse
- October 8 – Keith Reed
- October 10 – Dan Bellino
- October 14 – Ryan Church
- October 15:
  - Juan Cruz
  - Josh Rabe
- October 23 – John Lackey
- October 24 – Chris Bootcheck
- October 25 – J. J. Davis
- October 26 – Jaime Cerda
- October 30 – Luis Matos

=== November ===
- November 2 – Carmen Cali
- November 3 – Anastacio Martínez
- November 4 – John Grabow
- November 5 – Corey Thurman
- November 7 – Juan Salas
- November 9:
  - Todd Self
  - Jason Standridge
- November 10 – Jorge DePaula
- November 12 – Aaron Heilman
- November 14 – Xavier Nady
- November 17:
  - Darnell McDonald
  - Valentino Pascucci
- November 18 – Tim Hummel
- November 19 – Jeff Bailey
- November 20 – Bill White
- November 25:
  - Joe Borchard
  - Zach McClellan
- November 27 – Jimmy Rollins

=== December ===
- December 2 – Peter Moylan
- December 3 – Matt Childers
- December 5 – Josh Stewart
- December 6:
  - Chris Başak
  - Jason Bulger
- December 8 – Vernon Wells
- December 9 – Jeff Duncan
- December 11 – Jason Szuminski
- December 14 – Dave Gassner
- December 15 – Michael Wuertz
- December 17:
  - Alex Cintrón
  - Chase Utley
- December 19:
  - Andy Cannizaro
  - Vinnie Chulk
  - Marshall McDougall
  - Mark Woodyard
- December 21 – Dicky Gonzalez
- December 22 – Chris Jakubauskas
- December 23 – Víctor Martínez
- December 26 – Charles Thomas

== Deaths ==
=== January ===
- January 2 – Óscar Estrada, 75, Cuban southpaw pitcher and outfielder who played in both the Eastern Colored League (33 games for the 1924 Cuban Stars East) and segregated Organized Baseball (including one game for the 1929 St. Louis Browns)
- January 4 – Joe Dawson, 80, pitcher for 1924 Cleveland Indians and 1927–1929 Pittsburgh Pirates, getting into 59 career games; member of 1927 National League champions who hurled a scoreless inning against the "Murderers' Row" 1927 Yankees in Game 2 of Fall Classic
- January 5 – Snipe Conley, 85, pitcher who worked in 60 games for the 1914–1915 Baltimore Terrapins of the "outlaw" Federal League, then appeared in five games for the 1918 Cincinnati Reds
- January 6 – Tony Rego, 80, Hawaiian-born, diminutive catcher—he was listed as 5 feet 4 inches (1.63 m) tall—who appeared in 44 games for 1924–1925 St. Louis Browns
- January 7 – George H. Burns, 84, first baseman for five American League teams who batted .307 in 1,866 career games over 16 seasons; led AL in hits twice (1918 and 1926) and won the league's MVP award in the latter year; member of two World Series champions, the 1920 Cleveland Indians and 1929 Philadelphia Athletics
- January 13:
  - Bill Clowers, 79, pitcher for the Boston Red Sox in the 1920s
  - Merwin Jacobson, 83, backup outfielder for the New York Giants, Chicago Cubs and Brooklyn Robins between 1915 and 1927
  - Joe McCarthy, 90, Hall of Fame manager who led the New York Yankees to eight pennants and record seven World Series titles; also won 1929 NL pennant with Chicago Cubs, and was first manager to capture flags in both leagues; posted a 1,460–867 (.627) mark with the Yankees alone, from 1931 through May 23, 1946, when he resigned; also managed Boston Red Sox from 1948 to June 18, 1950; as of 2021, his 2,125 career wins ranked eighth in major league history, and his winning percentages of .615 (regular season) and .698 (postseason) were both all-time records
- January 19 – Milt Shoffner, 72, left-handed hurler for 1929–1931 Cleveland Indians, 1937–1939 Boston Bees and 1939–1940 Cincinnati Reds, working in 134 career major league games
- January 23 – Thurman Jennings, 87, outfielder and second baseman for the 1920–1921 Chicago Giants of the Negro National League
- January 27:
  - Sarge Connally, 79, pitcher who appeared in 304 games in 12 seasons spanning 1921 to 1934 for the Chicago White Sox and Cleveland Indians
  - Monte Pearson, 69, All-Star pitcher who won 100 games, mainly with the 1932–1935 Indians and 1936–1940 New York Yankees; four time World Series champion as a member of Bronx Bombers
- January 28 – Larry Raines, 47, middle infielder and third baseman for the Cleveland Indians from 1957 to 1958, who is recognized for having been the first ballplayer to perform professionally in Minor League Baseball, Negro league baseball, Japanese Baseball and the major leagues
- January 29 – Sam Thompson, 69, pitcher who appeared in the Negro leagues between 1932 and 1942, primarily for the Philadelphia Stars of the Negro National League

=== February ===
- February 1 – Jack Saltzgaver, 75, infielder for New York Yankees (1932 and 1934–1937) who, after almost eight full years in the minors, returned to MLB at age 42 in 1945 for a final stint for the wartime Pittsburgh Pirates; two-time (1936, 1937) World Series champion
- February 2 – Archie Wise, 65, appeared in three games as a pitcher and pinch hitter for 1932 Chicago White Sox
- February 3:
  - Pete Compton, 88, outfielder who appeared in 291 games for five clubs, notably the St. Louis Browns, between 1911 and 1918
  - Ray Flaskamper, 76, Chicago White Sox shortstop who played in 26 games in 1927
  - Mike Herrera, 85, Cuban second baseman for the Cuban Stars of the Negro National League and Eastern Colored League (1920–1921, 1928) and Boston Red Sox (1925–1926); one of the first to play in both the pre-integration U.S. Major Leagues and Negro leagues
- February 4 – Dave Keefe, 81, pitcher in 97 games for Philadelphia Athletics and Cleveland Indians between 1917 and 1922, later a longtime coach and traveling secretary for the Athletics
- February 6:
  - Babe Ganzel, 76, outfielder who appeared in 23 games for 1927–1928 Washington Senators; son of 19th century MLB catcher
  - Roy Grover, 86, second baseman for Philadelphia Athletics (1916–1917, 1919) and Washington Senators (1919); played in 207 big-league games
- February 8 – Josephine Kabick, 55, female pitcher who played from 1944 through 1947 in the All-American Girls Professional Baseball League
- February 15 – Claude Hayslett, 65, second baseman and pitcher in the Negro leagues between 1937 and 1941
- February 18 – Luke Hamlin, 73, pitcher who worked in 261 games over nine seasons between 1933 and 1944 for four MLB clubs, notably the Brooklyn Dodgers, for whom he went 20–13 in 1939
- February 19 – Phil Paine, 47, who compiled a 10–1 won–lost mark in 95 games pitched for the Boston/Milwaukee Braves (1951, 1954–1957) and St. Louis Cardinals (1958); said to be the first American to play in Nippon Professional Baseball when he hurled for the 1953 Nishitetsu Lions during his posting to Japan as a U.S. serviceman
- February 21 – Slicker Parks, 82, pitcher who worked in ten contests for the 1921 Detroit Tigers
- February 23 – Vic Harris, 72, outfielder and manager in the Negro leagues who guided the Homestead Grays to seven Negro National League pennants, including five in a row from 1937 to 1941; played in six East-West All-Star games between 1933 and 1947
- February 27 – Gerard "Nig" Lipscomb, 67, second baseman and pitcher who appeared in 36 games for 1937 St. Louis Browns

=== March ===
- March 3 – Ted Strong, 61, multi-year All-Star at both right field and shortstop who played in the Negro American League between 1937 and 1948, principally for the Kansas City Monarchs; member of Monarchs' 1942 Negro World Series champions; also a member of basketball's Harlem Globetrotters
- March 7 – Steve Bilko, 49, portly first baseman who appeared in 600 MLB games for the St. Louis Cardinals (1949–1954), Chicago Cubs (1954), Cincinnati Redlegs (1958), Los Angeles Dodgers (1958), Detroit Tigers (1960) and Los Angeles Angels (1961–1962); legendary minor-league slugger who led Pacific Coast League in home runs for three straight years (1955–1957), belting 55 and 56 homers in the latter two seasons and winning the 1956 PCL Triple Crown; three-time PCL MVP and member of its Hall of Fame
- March 8 – Wade Johnston, 79, outfielder who played for five Negro leagues clubs between 1922 and 1933, notably the Kansas City Monarchs and Detroit Stars; led 1930 Negro National League with ten triples in 69 games played
- March 12:
  - Ferrell Anderson, 60, backup catcher who played in 97 career games for the 1946 Brooklyn Dodgers and 1953 St. Louis Cardinals
  - Alex McCarthy, 88, infielder for the Pittsburgh Pirates and Chicago Cubs from 1910 to 1917, getting into 432 career contests
  - Gene Moore, 68, right fielder known for his accurate arm who played 1,042 games for six MLB clubs between 1931 and 1945; 1937 National League All-Star and member of 1944 St. Louis Browns, only team from that city to win an American League pennant
- March 14 – Kent Greenfield, 75, pitcher who appeared in 152 games between 1924 and 1929 for the New York Giants, Boston Braves and Brooklyn Robins
- March 16 – Moe Franklin, 63, infielder who got into 61 career games for 1941–1942 Detroit Tigers
- March 21 – Fritz Coumbe, 88, a pitcher for the Boston Red Sox, Cleveland Naps and Indians and the Cincinnati Reds between 1914 and 1921
- March 27 – Dutch Zwilling, 89, outfielder in 366 games for three Chicago MLB teams during the 1910s: the 1910 White Sox, 1914–1915 Whales (of the then "outlaw" Federal League), and 1916 Cubs; led Fed circuit in home runs with 16 in 1914 and runs batted in with 94 the following season; longtime minor-league manager and big-league scout
- March 30 – Billy Cox, 58, third baseman, mainly with the Brooklyn Dodgers (1948–1954), well known for his spectacular defense

=== April ===
- April 2 – Bill Brubaker, 67, third baseman for the Pittsburgh Pirates for all or parts of 1932 through 1940, then briefly for Boston Braves in 1943; drove in 102 runs in 1936, but led NL hitters in strikeouts
- April 3 – Ray French, 83, shortstop/second baseman in 82 games for the 1920 New York Yankees, 1923 Brooklyn Robins and 1924 Chicago White Sox
- April 8:
  - Ford Frick, 83, Hall of Fame executive who served as Commissioner of Baseball (1951–1965) and president of the National League (1935–1951); ex-sportswriter and "ghostwriter" for Babe Ruth who ruled in 1961 that home run records of Ruth and Roger Maris would be recorded separately based on season length
  - Dick Risenhoover, 51, Dallas sportscaster; member of the Texas Rangers' broadcast team since the team moved from Washington in 1972 and lead announcer from 1974 until his death
- April 14 – Joe Gordon, 63, Baseball Hall of Famer and nine-time All-Star second baseman in 11 seasons for the New York Yankees and Cleveland Indians, who won the 1942 MVP award and set an American League record of 246 home runs at his position; later a manager (Indians, Detroit Tigers, Kansas City Athletics and Kansas City Royals between 1958 and 1969)
- April 20 – Jack Graney, 91, Canadian left fielder who played his entire career (1908, 1910–1922) with the Cleveland Naps/Indians; first batter to face hurler Babe Ruth in a major-league game (July 11, 1914); in 1932 became the Indians' play-by-play broadcaster—the first former player to transition to radio booth—and held the job through 1953
- April 25 – Leo Najo, 79, first Mexican-born player to play professional baseball in the US.
- April 28 – Art Doll, 64, batteryman who played seven MLB games for Boston of the National League in 1935, 1936 and 1938—four as a pitcher and three as a catcher

=== May ===
- May 1 – Claude Corbitt, 62, infield utility who played for the Brooklyn Dodgers and Cincinnati Reds in a span of four seasons from 1945 to 1949
- May 8 – Red Smith, 73, two-sport star at Notre Dame, then a player and coach in both professional baseball and professional football; debuted as a catcher for the New York Giants of the National League in 1927 and later played with the Green Bay Packers of the National Football League; later an assistant coach with the Packers and New York football Giants, a minor league manager, and a coach for Chicago Cubs, 1945–1949
- May 15 – Herman Dunlap, 70, outfielder for the Chicago American Giants of the Negro American League in 1937 and 1938
- May 16 – Mike Wilson, 81, catcher for the 1921 Pittsburgh Pirates
- May 20 – Bob Logan, 68, pitcher who played for the Brooklyn Dodgers, Detroit Tigers, Chicago Cubs, Cincinnati Reds and Boston Braves in all or part of five seasons between 1935 and 1945
- May 22 – Pete Susko, 73, first baseman for the Washington Senators in its 1934 season
- May 26 – Harris McGalliard, 71, Japanese Baseball League catcher who played for Nagoya and the Korakuen Eagles from 1936 to 1938
- May 29 – Carl Reynolds, 75, fine outfielder and consistent hitter who played from 1927 through 1939 for the Chicago White Sox, Washington Senators, St. Louis Browns, Boston Red Sox, and Chicago Cubs, ending his career with a lifetime .302 batting average, including 1,357 hits, 80 home runs, and 699 runs batted in 1,222 games

=== June ===
- June 2 – Bob McGraw, 83, pitcher for the New York Yankees, Boston Red Sox, Brooklyn Robins, St. Louis Cardinals and Philadelphia Phillies in a span of nine seasons from 1917 to 1929
- June 3 – Marv Rickert, 57, backup outfielder who played with five different clubs in five seasons, including the 1948 Boston Braves who won the National League pennant
- June 16 – Hugh Shelley, 67, outfielder who played for the Detroit Tigers in 1935, though he was not on their World Series roster that season
- June 20 – Bill Dietrich, 68, nicknamed "Bullfrog", pitcher who played from 1933 through 1948 for the Philadelphia Athletics, Washington Senators and Chicago White Sox, whose no-hitter over the St. Louis Browns on June 1, 1937, boosted the White Sox' chances during their futile pursuit of the American League pennant
- June 20 – Stack Martin, 79, who played every position (although mainly a first baseman) for the Indianapolis ABCs and Detroit Stars of the Negro National League from 1925 to 1928
- June 21 – Tom Fiall, 84, outfielder for Brooklyn, Baltimore and New York of the Eastern Colored League in 1923 and 1925
- June 28 – Johnny Schulte, 81, backup catcher for five teams in all of his five years in the Major Leagues between 1923 and 1932; member of the 1929 National League pennant-winning Chicago Cubs; later a coach during 15 full seasons for the New York Yankees from 1934 to 1948, winning seven World Series rings; trusted advisor of Hall of Fame manager Joe McCarthy
- June 30 – Danny Lynch, 52, second baseman for the 1948 Chicago Cubs

=== July ===
- July 1 – Joe Vance, 72, pitcher for the Chicago White Sox and New York Yankees in parts of three seasons between 1935 and 1938
- July 12 – Herb Souell, 65, All-Star third baseman for the 1940–1948 Kansas City Monarchs; led Negro American League in stolen bases (twice, in 1946–1947), runs batted in (1945), triples (1946), and hits (1947); member of 1942 Negro World Series champs
- July 15 – Deacon Meyers, 78, pitcher/first baseman for the St. Louis Giants/Stars and Dayton Marcos of the Negro National League between 1921 and 1926
- July 24 – Joel Hunt, 72, Hall of Fame football player and coach, who also played 16 games in the majors as an outfielder and pinch hitter for the 1931–1932 St. Louis Cardinals
- July 29 – Charlie Bold, 83, Swedish first baseman who played for the St. Louis Browns in its 1914 season

=== August ===
- August 2 – Ewing Russell, 72, third baseman for the 1924 and 1926 Harrisburg Giants (Eastern Colored League) and 1926 Dayton Marcos (Negro National League)
- August 5 – Jesse Haines, 85, Hall of Fame pitcher who won 210 games, including a no-hitter, for the St. Louis Cardinals, while compiling three 20-win seasons, and two wins in the 1926 World Series
- August 7 – Kay Lionikas, 54, second baseman with the Kenosha Comets, one of three descendants of Greek immigrants to play in the All-American Girls Professional Baseball League
- August 14 – Maury Newlin, 64, pitcher who played with the St. Louis Browns in the 1940 and 1941 seasons
- August 15 – Ed Chaplin, 84, catcher for the Boston Red Sox between 1920 and 1922
- August 18 – George Harper, 86, outfielder for six teams in five seasons between 1943 and 1950, who hit .300 or higher in three of these seasons
- August 23 – Hal Weafer, 78, American League umpire from 1943 to 1947; former minor league first baseman and manager
- August 30 – Ed Sicking, 81, middle infielder and third baseman who played for the Chicago Cubs, New York Giants, Philadelphia Phillies, Cincinnati Reds and Pittsburgh Pirates over part of five seasons from 1916 to 1927

=== September ===
- September 11:
  - Mike Gazella, 82, utility infielder for the New York Yankees in four seasons between 1923 and 1928, being a member of three World Series champion teams and one AL pennant winner
  - Snipe Hansen, 71, pitcher for the Philadelphia Phillies and St. Louis Browns in a span of five seasons from 1930 to 1935
- September 15 – Larry Bettencourt, 72, outfielder and third baseman who played for the St. Louis Browns in three seasons from 1928 to 1932, and later served as a center for the NFL Green Bay Packers in 1933
- September 16 – Bill Foster, 74, star pitcher in the Negro leagues where he was a dominant left-hander, and later a head coach at Alcorn State University for two decades
- September 18 – Joe Lillard, 73, NFL halfback (1932–1933) and outfielder/pitcher for the Chicago American Giants and Cincinnati Tigers of the Negro leagues between 1932 and 1937
- September 24 – Lyman Bostock, 27, fine defensive outfielder and base runner for California Angels who hit .323 and .336 during his first two full big league seasons with the 1976–1977 Minnesota Twins; his life and career were cut short when he was the victim of a meaningless, accidental homicide; son of Negro leagues star Lyman Sr.
- September 25 – Pepper Daniels, 76, catcher for four Negro leagues clubs between 1921 and 1935, primarily the Detroit Stars

=== October ===
- October 1:
  - Abe White, 74, pitcher for the St. Louis Cardinals in 1937
  - Ed Steele, 63, outfielder for the 1942–1948 Birmingham Black Barons who batted .359 lifetime and led the Negro American League in hitting (.391) in 1945
- October 8 – Jim Gilliam, 49, two-time All-Star second baseman for the Brooklyn/Los Angeles Dodgers from 1953 to 1966, player-coach in 1965–1966, and full-time Dodgers' coach from 1967 until his death; won four World Series rings, as well as Rookie of the Year Award honors both in the Negro leagues and the National League; after his passing, his jersey #19 was retired by the Dodgers
- October 13 – George Jeffcoat, 64, pitcher in 70 career games for the Brooklyn Dodgers and Boston Braves in four seasons between 1936 and 1943; brother of Hal Jeffcoat; after baseball, became an ordained Baptist minister
- October 16 – Eddie Stumpf, 84, minor league player, manager, coach, scout and executive in a career that spanned more than four decades
- October 25 – Molly Craft, 82, pitcher who played from 1916 through 1919 for the Washington Senators
- October 27 – Rube Walberg, 82, pitcher who won 155 games between 1923 and 1937, primarily with the Philadelphia Athletics; member of 1929–1930 world champions
- October 30 – Reese Diggs, 63, pitcher who appeared in four games for the Washington Senators in the 1934 season

=== November ===
- November 5 – Tommy O'Brien, 59, backup outfielder for the Pittsburgh Pirates, Boston Red Sox and Washington Senators in a span of five seasons from 1943 to 1950
- November 8 – Steve Gerkin, 75, 32-year-old rookie pitcher who played for the Philadelphia Athletics in its 1945 season, one of many ballplayers who only appeared in the major leagues during World War II
- November 11 – Bennie Borgmann, 80, minor-league infielder and manager and NBA basketball player who served the St. Louis Cardinals as a longtime scout; member of Basketball Hall of Fame
- November 12:
  - Buzz Boyle, 70, outfielder for the Boston Braves and Brooklyn Dodgers during five seasons spanning 1929–1935; led National League outfielders in assists in 1934 and also had a 25-game hitting streak that year; later a minor league manager and served as pilot of the 1946 Muskegon Lassies of the All-American Girls Professional Baseball League; longtime scout for Cincinnati Reds and Montreal Expos
  - Roy Elsh, 87, backup outfielder for the Chicago White Sox over part of two seasons from 1923 to 1925
  - George Shears, 88, pitcher for the 1912 New York Highlanders
- November 13 – Les Powers, 69, first baseman who played with the New York Giants in 1938 and for the Philadelphia Phillies in 1939
- November 16:
  - France Laux, 80, St. Louis sportscaster who gained fame as voice of the 1930s Cardinals, calling their games (and those of the American League's Browns) from 1930 through 1942; focused on Cardinals in 1943 and then switched to Browns in 1948, continuing with them part-time until 1953, their last season in Missouri before they became the Baltimore Orioles; worked six World Series and eight All-Star games
  - Harry Matuzak, 68, pitcher who played for the Philadelphia Athletics in the 1936 and 1938 seasons
- November 20 – Warren Brown, 84, Chicago sportswriter, who earned J. G. Taylor Spink Award honors in 1973, and was inducted in the National Baseball Hall of Fame the same year along with outfielder Mickey Mantle, pitcher Whitey Ford and umpire Jocko Conlan
- November 23 – Buck Ross, 63, pitcher who played from 1936 through 1945 for the Philadelphia Athletics and Chicago White Sox
- November 29 – Al Williamson, 78, pitcher for the 1928 Chicago White Sox

=== December ===
- December 8 – Nick Cullop, 78, backup outfielder who played for the New York Yankees, Washington Senators, Cleveland Indians, Brooklyn Robins and Cincinnati Reds over part of five seasons spanning 1926–1931; fearsome slugger and longtime skipper in minor leagues
- December 9 – Dick Siebert, 66, All-Star first baseman for the Philadelphia Athletics who twice batted .300, and later coached at the University of Minnesota for 31 years, while winning three College World Series titles
- December 11 – Paul O'Dea, 58, two-way player (primarily an outfielder who appeared in four games as a southpaw hurler) who played in 163 contests for the Cleveland Indians from 1944 to 1945 and later scouted and managed in the Cleveland farm system
- December 12 – Nick Dumovich, 76, pitcher for the 1923 Chicago Cubs
- December 20 – Willard Mullin, 76, cartoonist whose caricature of the Brooklyn Bum personified the Dodgers franchise prior to its move to Los Angeles in 1958
- December 21:
  - Joe Mathes, 87, second baseman who played for the Philadelphia Athletics, St. Louis Terriers and Boston Braves in a span of three seasons from 1912 to 1916; managed in the minor leagues off and on from 1919 through 1934, then became a scout and farm system director for the St. Louis Cardinals
  - Gus Rooney, 86, Boston sportswriter believed to be the first play-by-play radio announcer for the Boston Red Sox on April 13, 1926; also broadcast games of the National League Braves that season
- December 24:
  - George McQuinn, 68, seven-time All-Star first baseman for the St. Louis Browns and New York Yankees, who had 34-game hitting streak in 1938
  - Bill Rodgers, 91, second baseman who played between 1915 and 1916 for the Cleveland Indians, Boston Red Sox and Cincinnati Reds
- December 29 – Walt Alexander, 87, backup who played for the St. Louis Browns and New York Yankees in part of four seasons from 1912 to 1917
- December 30 – Bobby Williams, 83, shortstop whose career was mostly spent with the Chicago American Giants of the Negro National League between 1920 and 1928; managed the 1934 Cleveland Red Sox to a 4–24 record
- December 31 – Tod Davis, 54, infielder and pinch-hitter who played for the Philadelphia Athletics in the 1949 and 1951 seasons
