= Jeffcoat =

Jeffcoat is a surname. Notable people with the surname include:

- Emma Jeffcoat (born 1994), Australian triathlete
- George Jeffcoat (1913–1978), American baseball player
- Hal Jeffcoat (1924–2007), American baseball player
- Harold George Jeffcoat (born 1947), American academic administrator
- Hollis Jeffcoat (1952–2018), American painter
- Jackson Jeffcoat (born 1990), American football player
- Jan Jeffcoat (born 1980), American television news anchor
- Jim Jeffcoat (born 1961), American football player
- John Jeffcoat, American film director
- Mike Jeffcoat (born 1959), American baseball player
- Rupert Jeffcoat (born 1970), Scottish organist
- Trajan Jeffcoat (born 1999), American football player

== See also ==
- Jeffcott
