= Joe Vance =

American baseball player (1905–1978)

- Pitcher
- Born: September 16, 1905; Devine, Texas, U.S.
- Died: July 4, 1978 (aged 72); Devine, Texas, U.S.
- Batted: Right Threw: Right

MLB debut
- April 18, 1935, for the Chicago White Sox

Last MLB appearance
- August 10, 1938, for the New York Yankees

MLB statistics
- Win–loss record: 3–2
- Earned run average: 5.81
- Strikeouts: 17
- Stats at Baseball Reference

Teams
- Chicago White Sox (1935); New York Yankees (1937–1938)

Joseph 'Sandy' Albert Vance (September 16, 1905 – July 4, 1978) was an American professional baseball pitcher in Major League Baseball. He pitched parts of three seasons in the majors between 1935 and 1938 for the Chicago White Sox and New York Yankees.

Vance was born in Devine, Texas, and went to Devine High School and then Southwest Texas State Teachers College where he lettered in five sports including football (1927), basketball (1928-29), baseball and track (1927).

While he didn't have much success as a pitcher, Vance was known for being fast - and likely the fastest person in baseball at one point. In 1929, he set the world record for running the bases at 13 seconds. Speaking in 1943, pitcher Max Macon of the baseball Dodgers, against whom Vance had competed in both the American Association and International League, called his former mound opponent the fastest man he'd ever seen. He turned down a chance to compete in the 1928 Olympics in track to concentrate on baseball.

He started his career in the minors and played 13 seasons of minor league baseball between 1930 and 1942. He finished with a win-loss record at that level of 108-101, and a 3.53 earned run average.

Vance also played 11 games for the football Brooklyn Dodgers in 1931 as a running back.

In 1933 Vance played for the Dallas Steers in the Texas League where he was named the best all-around player in the Texas League. In 1934 he was signed by the Chicago White Sox in September but continued to play for the Steers and also played football for the Dallas Rams of the 1934 American Football League. In June of 1935 he was released by the White Sox to Toronto. By 1936, he was playing for the Kansas City Blues.

Late in the 1937 season, Vance was called up to the Yankees and started the 1938 season with them before spending a short time back with the Blues. In 1938, Vance's season was cut short when he came down with appendicitis, which led the Yankees to trade Myril Hoag to the Nationals for Wes Ferrell. The Yankees won the World Series in both 1937 and 1938, but Vance did not play in those games.

In Panama he met his wife, Helen Liddy and the two were married in New York City in 1938. During World War II, he served in the Navy.

== Sources ==
- Career statistics from Baseball Reference · Baseball Reference (Minors) · Retrosheet
