= Jeffcott =

Jeffcott is a surname. Notable people with the surname include:

- John Jeffcott (1796–1837), first judge of the Supreme Court of South Australia
- John Moore Jeffcott (1817–1892), Isle of Man advocate and politician
- William Jeffcott (1800–1855), judge of the Supreme Court of New South Wales

== See also ==
- Jeffcoat, surname
- Jeffcott rotor
