= 1978 Senior League World Series =

American youth baseball tournament

Tournament information
- Location: Gary, Indiana
- Dates: August 14–19, 1978

Final positions
- Champions: Hualien, Taiwan
- Runner-up: Burbank, Illinois

The 1978 Senior League World Series took place from August 14–19 in Gary, Indiana, United States. Hualien, Taiwan defeated Burbank, Illinois in the championship game. It was Taiwan's seventh straight championship.

== Teams ==
United States	International
(New York (state)) Queens Village, New York East	Surrey, British Columbia Canada
(Illinois) Burbank, Illinois North	(Spain) Madrid, Spain Europe
(Texas) Waskom, Texas South	(Taiwan) Hualien, Taiwan Far East
(Hawaii) Kaneohe, Hawaii West	(Netherlands Antilles) Aruba, Netherlands Antilles Latin America

== Results ==
Upper round 1	Upper round 2	Upper final	Championship
—	(New York (state)) New York	9
—	Canada	6
1–0	(New York (state)) New York	2
1–0	Taiwan	16
—	Taiwan	13
—	Illinois	1
2–0	Taiwan	12
2–0	Texas	3
—	Netherlands Antilles	0
—	Hawaii	4
1–0	Hawaii	1
1–0	Texas	3
—	Spain	0
—	Texas	6	3–0	Taiwan	3	—
4–1	Illinois	2	—
Lower round 1	Lower round 2	Lower round 3	Lower final
1–1	Hawaii	1
0–1	Canada	2	1–1	Illinois	4	2–1	Texas	0
0–1	Illinois	13	2–1	Illinois	3	3–1	Illinois	22
2–1	Netherlands Antilles	0
1–1	(New York (state)) New York	4
0–1	Netherlands Antilles	2	1–1	Netherlands Antilles	8
0–1	Spain	0

1978 Senior League World Series Champions
Hualien, Taiwan
