= Devine Independent School District =

School district in Texas, United States

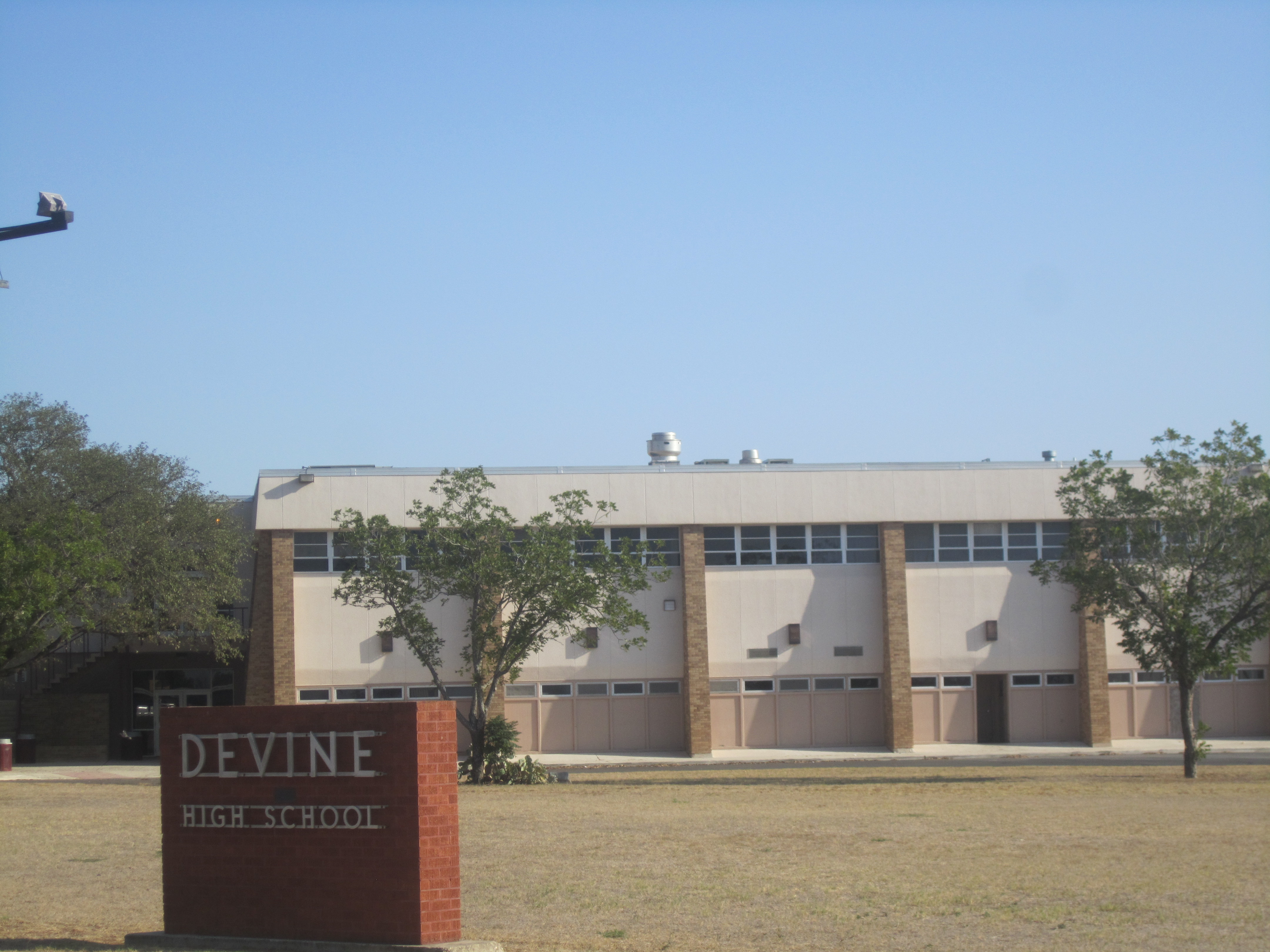
Devine High School

Devine Independent School District is a public school district based in Devine, Texas (USA).

Located in Medina County, a portion of the district extends into Frio County.

In 2009, the school district was rated "academically acceptable" by the Texas Education Agency.

== Schools ==
- Devine High (Grades 9-12)
- Devine Middle (Grades 6-8)
- Devine Intermediate (Grades 3-5)
- John J. Ciavarra Elementary (Grades PK-2)
