= Claude Hayslett =

American baseball player

- Pitcher
- Born: August 2, 1912; Fayette County, Tennessee, U.S.
- Died: February 15, 1978 (aged 65); Memphis, Tennessee, U.S.
- Threw: Right

Negro league baseball debut
- 1937, for the Indianapolis Athletics

Last appearance
- 1941, for the New York Black Yankees
- Stats at Baseball Reference

Teams
- Indianapolis Athletics (1937); Memphis Red Sox (1937–1938); Indianapolis ABCs (1939); New York Black Yankees (1941)

Claude Hayslett (August 2, 1912 – February 15, 1978), nicknamed "Tupelo Tornado", was an American Negro league baseball pitcher between 1937 and 1941.

A native of Fayette County, Tennessee, Hayslett made his Negro leagues debut in 1937 with the Indianapolis Athletics and Memphis Red Sox. He played for Memphis again the following season, then spent 1939 with the Indianapolis ABCs, and finished his career in 1941 with the New York Black Yankees. Hayslett died in Memphis, Tennessee in 1978 at age 65.
