= Ewing Russell =

American baseball player

- Third baseman
- Born: April 22, 1906; Nashville, Tennessee, U.S.
- Died: August 2, 1978 (aged 72); Nashville, Tennessee, U.S.
- Threw: R

Negro league baseball debut
- 1924, for the Harrisburg Giants

Last appearance
- 1936, for the Cincinnati Tigers

Teams
- Harrisburg Giants (1924, 1926); Dayton Marcos (1926); Cincinnati Tigers (1936)

Ewing "Big Boy" Russell (April 22, 1906 – August 2, 1978) was an American Negro league baseball third baseman who played in the 1920s and 1930s.

Russell played for the Harrisburg Giants in 1924 and 1926, and also played with the Dayton Marcos in 1926. He later played for the Cincinnati Tigers in 1936. In 34 recorded professional games, he posted 31 hits in 129 plate appearances.
