= Devine High School =

Public school in Texas, United States

Coordinates: 29.1484°N 98.9189°W

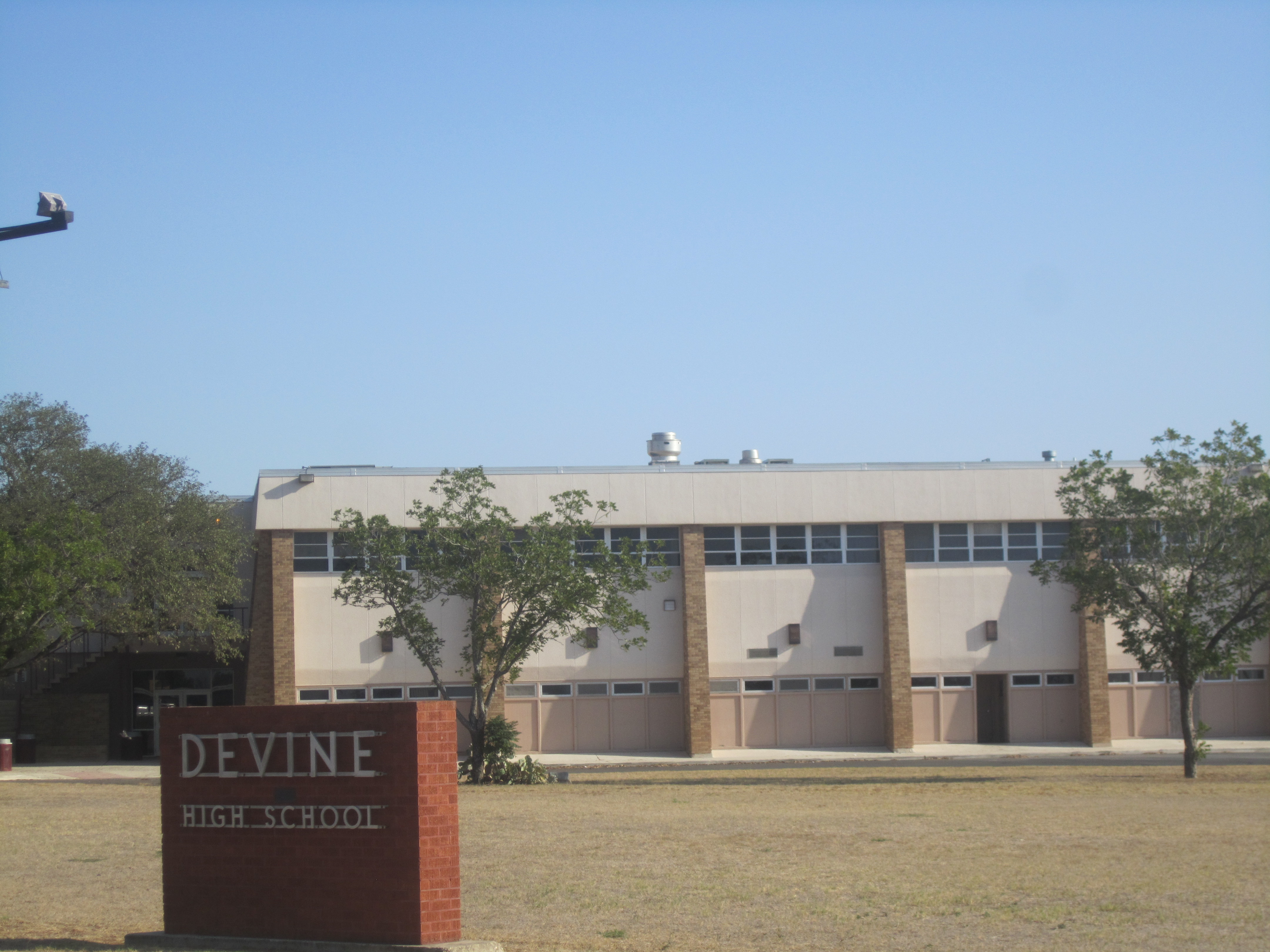

Location
- 1225 West Hondo Avenue; Devine, Texas 78016-1997; United States

Information
- School type: Public high school
- Established: 1881
- School district: Devine Independent School District
- Principal: Michael Gomez
- Grades: 9-12
- Enrollment: 575 (2023-2024)
- Colors: Maroon and gold
- Athletics conference: UIL Class AAA
- Mascot: Warhorse/Arabian
- Yearbook: Corral
- Website: www.devineisd.org/schools/dhs

Devine High School is a public high school located in the city of Devine, Texas, USA and classified as a 4A school by the UIL. It is a part of the Devine Independent School District located in southeastern Medina County. In 2015, the school was rated "Met Standard" by the Texas Education Agency.

== Athletics ==
The Devine Warhorses compete in these sports -

Volleyball, Cross Country, Football, Basketball, Powerlifting, Golf, Tennis, Track, Baseball & Softball

=== State Titles ===
- Girls Basketball -
  - 1962(2A)
- Volleyball -
  - 1987(3A), 1988(3A)

==== State Finalist ====
- Softball -
  - 1994(3A), 2000(3A)
