= Devine, Texas =

- City
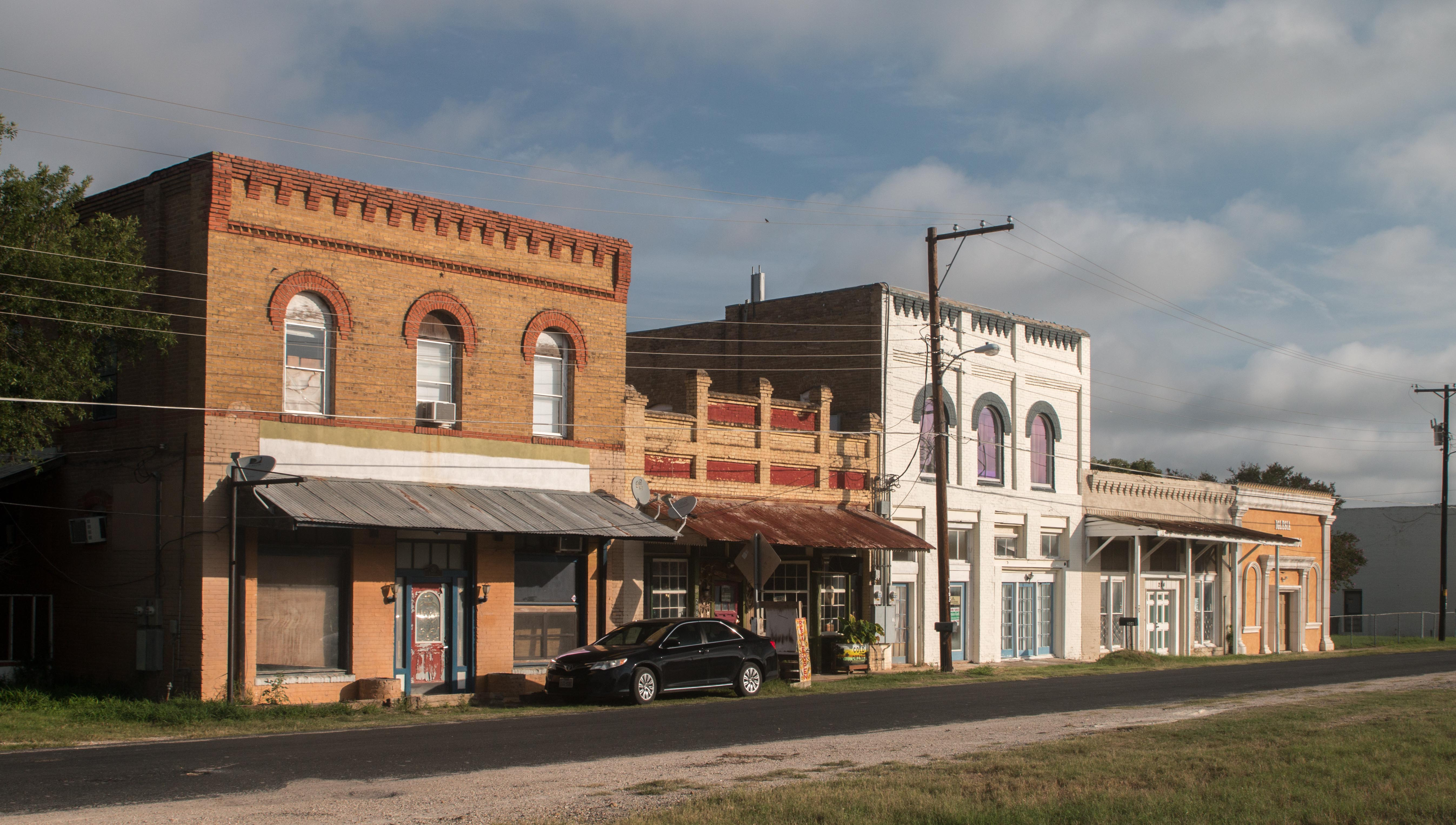
- Downtown Devine, Texas

- Location within Medina County

- Location within Texas Location within the United States
- Coordinates: 29°08′05″N 98°54′16″W
- Country: United States
- State: Texas
- County: Medina

Area
  - Total: 3.22 sq mi (8.35 km^{2})
  - Land: 3.21 sq mi (8.32 km^{2})
  - Water: 0.012 sq mi (0.03 km^{2})
- Elevation: 656 ft (200 m)

Population (2020)
  - Total: 4,324
  - Density: 1,345.4/sq mi (519.45/km^{2})
- Time zone: UTC-6 (Central (CST))
  - Summer (DST): UTC-5 (CDT)
- ZIP code: 78016
- Area code: 830
- FIPS code: 48-20152
- GNIS feature ID: 2410332
- Website: https://cityofdevine.org/

Devine is a city in Medina County, Texas, United States. The population was 4,324 at the 2020 census. It is part of the San Antonio metropolitan area.

== History ==
Devine, Texas, is named for Hon. Thomas J. Devine, a native of San Antonio.

== Geography ==
Devine is located 25 miles southwest of Downtown San Antonio. According to the United States Census Bureau, the city has a total area of 3.2 square miles (8.3 km^{2}), all of it land.

== Demographics ==
Historical population
Census	Pop.	Note	%±
1910	1,042		—
1920	995		−4.5%
1930	1,093		9.8%
1940	1,398		27.9%
1950	1,672		19.6%
1960	2,522		50.8%
1970	3,311		31.3%
1980	3,756		13.4%
1990	3,928		4.6%
2000	4,140		5.4%
2010	4,350		5.1%
2020	4,324		−0.6%
U.S. Decennial Census

=== 2020 census ===
As of the 2020 census, Devine had a population of 4,324. The median age was 39.4 years. 25.3% of residents were under the age of 18 and 18.7% of residents were 65 years of age or older. For every 100 females there were 94.2 males, and for every 100 females age 18 and over there were 89.5 males age 18 and over.

0.0% of residents lived in urban areas, while 100.0% lived in rural areas.

There were 1,561 households in Devine, of which 38.2% had children under the age of 18 living in them. Of all households, 46.0% were married-couple households, 17.1% were households with a male householder and no spouse or partner present, and 30.6% were households with a female householder and no spouse or partner present. About 24.3% of all households were made up of individuals and 12.9% had someone living alone who was 65 years of age or older.

There were 1,724 housing units, of which 9.5% were vacant. The homeowner vacancy rate was 2.8% and the rental vacancy rate was 6.2%.

Racial composition as of the 2020 census
Race	Number	Percent
White	2,805	64.9%
Black or African American	38	0.9%
American Indian and Alaska Native	51	1.2%
Asian	12	0.3%
Native Hawaiian and Other Pacific Islander	1	0.0%
Some other race	520	12.0%
Two or more races	897	20.7%
Hispanic or Latino (of any race)	2,643	61.1%

Devine racial composition (NH = Non-Hispanic) (Note: Note: the US Census treats Hispanic/Latino as an ethnic category. This table excludes Latinos from the racial categories and assigns them to a separate category. Hispanics/Latinos can be of any race.)
Race	Number	Percentage
White (NH)	1,551	35.87%
Black or African American (NH)	31	0.72%
Native American or Alaska Native (NH)	14	0.32%
Asian (NH)	8	0.19%
Pacific Islander (NH)	1	0.02%
Some Other Race (NH)	18	0.42%
Mixed/Multi-Racial (NH)	58	1.34%
Hispanic or Latino	2,643	61.12%
Total	4,324	

=== 2000 census ===
As of the census of 2000, there were 4,140 people, 1,443 households, and 1,079 families living in the city. The population density was 1,331.4 inhabitants per square mile (514.1/km^{2}). There were 1,551 housing units at an average density of 498.8 per square mile (192.6/km^{2}). The racial makeup of the city was 76.64% White, 0.68% African American, 0.77% Native American, 0.29% Asian, 18.53% from other races, and 3.09% from two or more races. Hispanic or Latino of any race were 52.25% of the population.

There were 1,443 households, out of which 38.0% had children under the age of 18 living with them, 54.7% were married couples living together, 14.1% had a female householder with no husband present, and 25.2% were non-families. 22.2% of all households were made up of individuals, and 10.7% had someone living alone who was 65 years of age or older. The average household size was 2.82 and the average family size was 3.29.

In the city, the population was spread out, with 29.3% under the age of 18, 9.6% from 18 to 24, 25.8% from 25 to 44, 21.1% from 45 to 64, and 14.2% who were 65 years of age or older. The median age was 34 years. For every 100 females, there were 95.6 males. For every 100 females age 18 and over, there were 89.6 males.

The median income for a household in the city was $28,712, and the median income for a family was $35,429. Males had a median income of $26,395 versus $18,605 for females. The per capita income for the city was $14,530. About 16.6% of families and 19.6% of the population were below the poverty line, including 24.4% of those under age 18 and 29.1% of those age 65 or over.

== Education ==
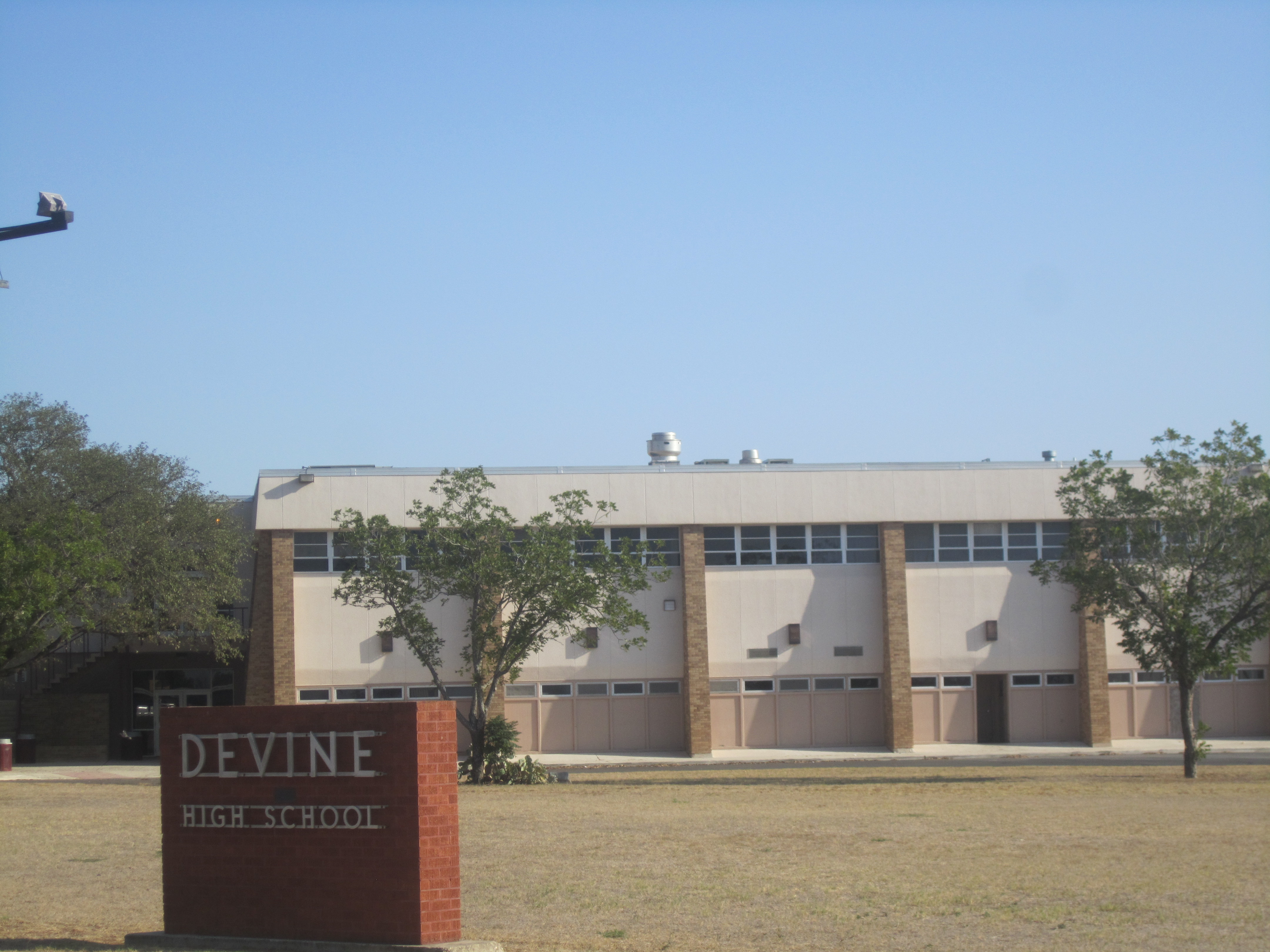
Devine High School

The City of Devine is served by the Devine Independent School District.

== Popular culture ==
The city serves as the setting for the murder mystery The Lesser of Two Evils by Zoe E. Whitten. NatureSweet, a tomato cultivar, was founded in the city.

== Government ==
The city is a General Law A Municipality with Government of a Mayor and Five Councilmen and/or Councilwomen. The mayor is Butch Cook

== Gallery ==
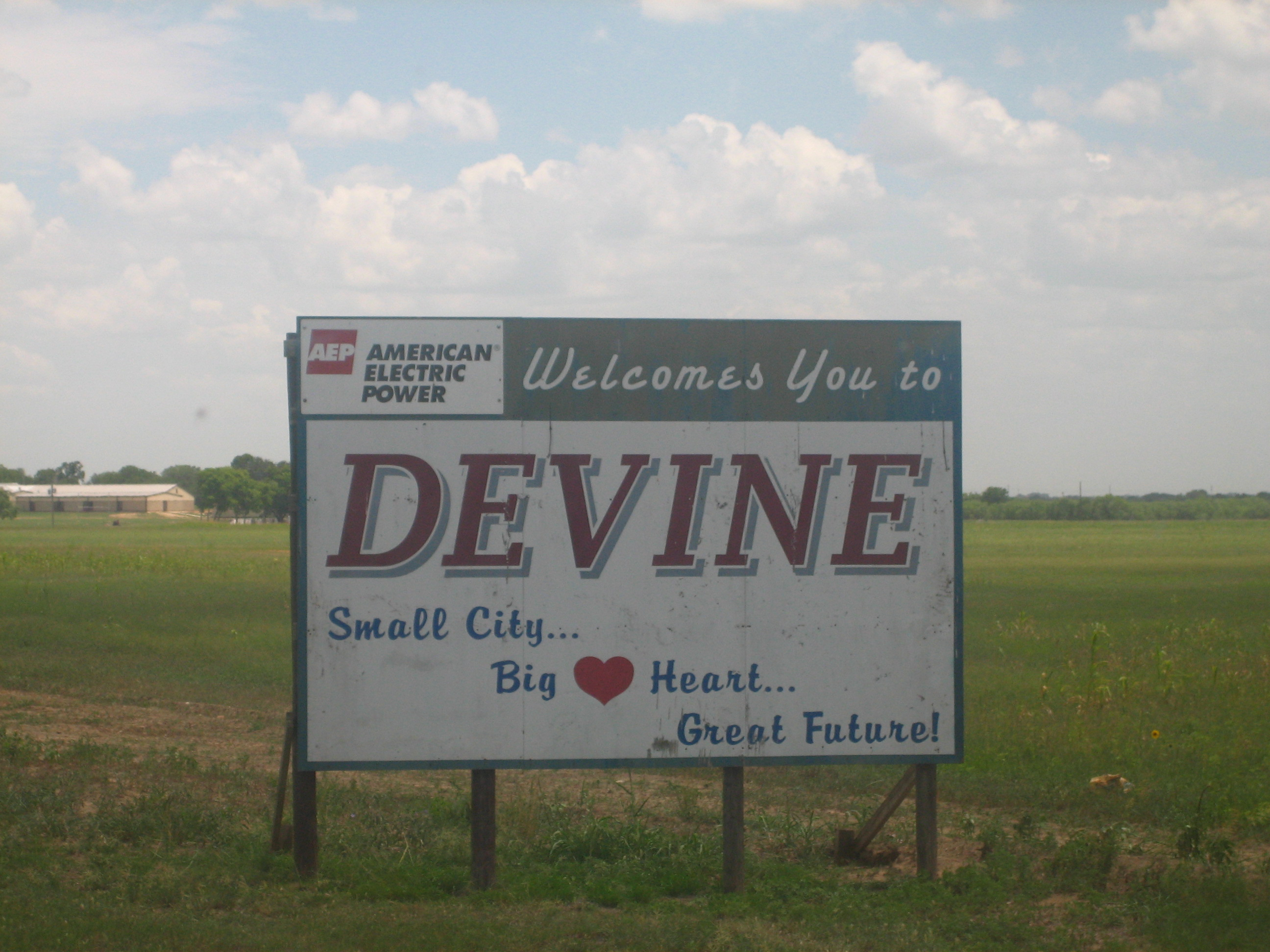
2008 picture of Devine entrance sign: "Small City, Big Heart, Great Future"

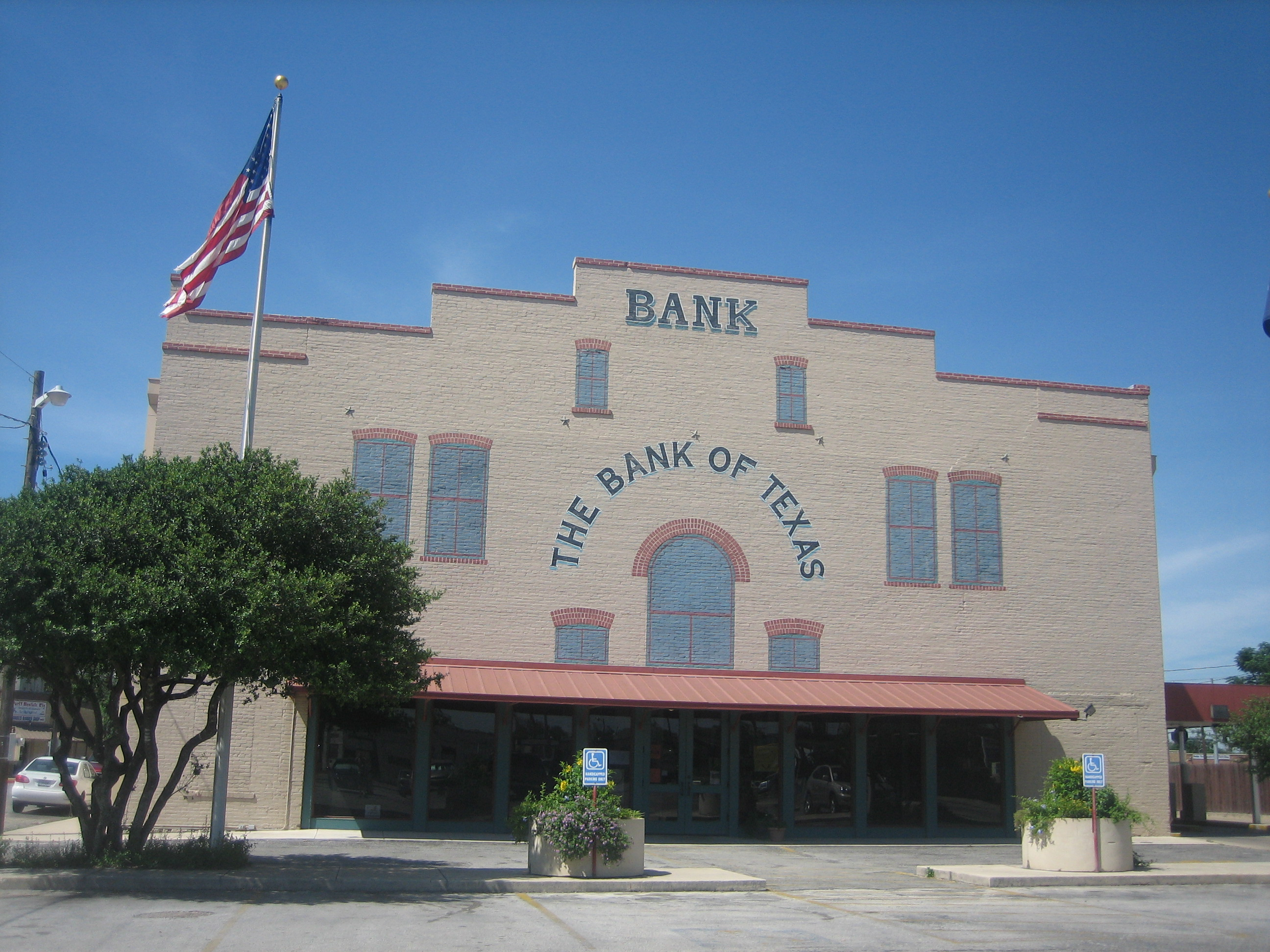
The Bank of Texas in Devine.

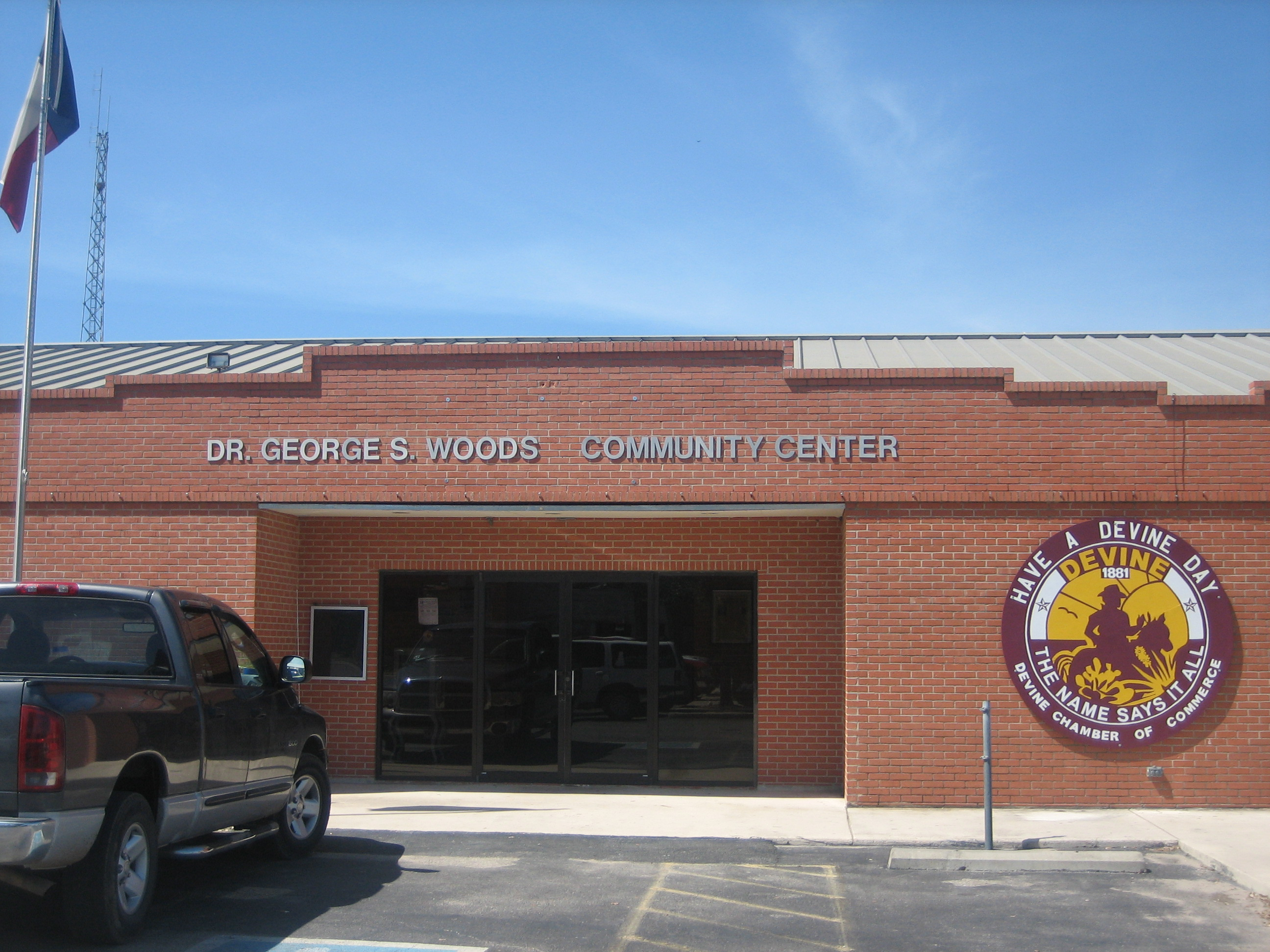
Dr. George S. Woods Community Center in Devine is located next to the library.

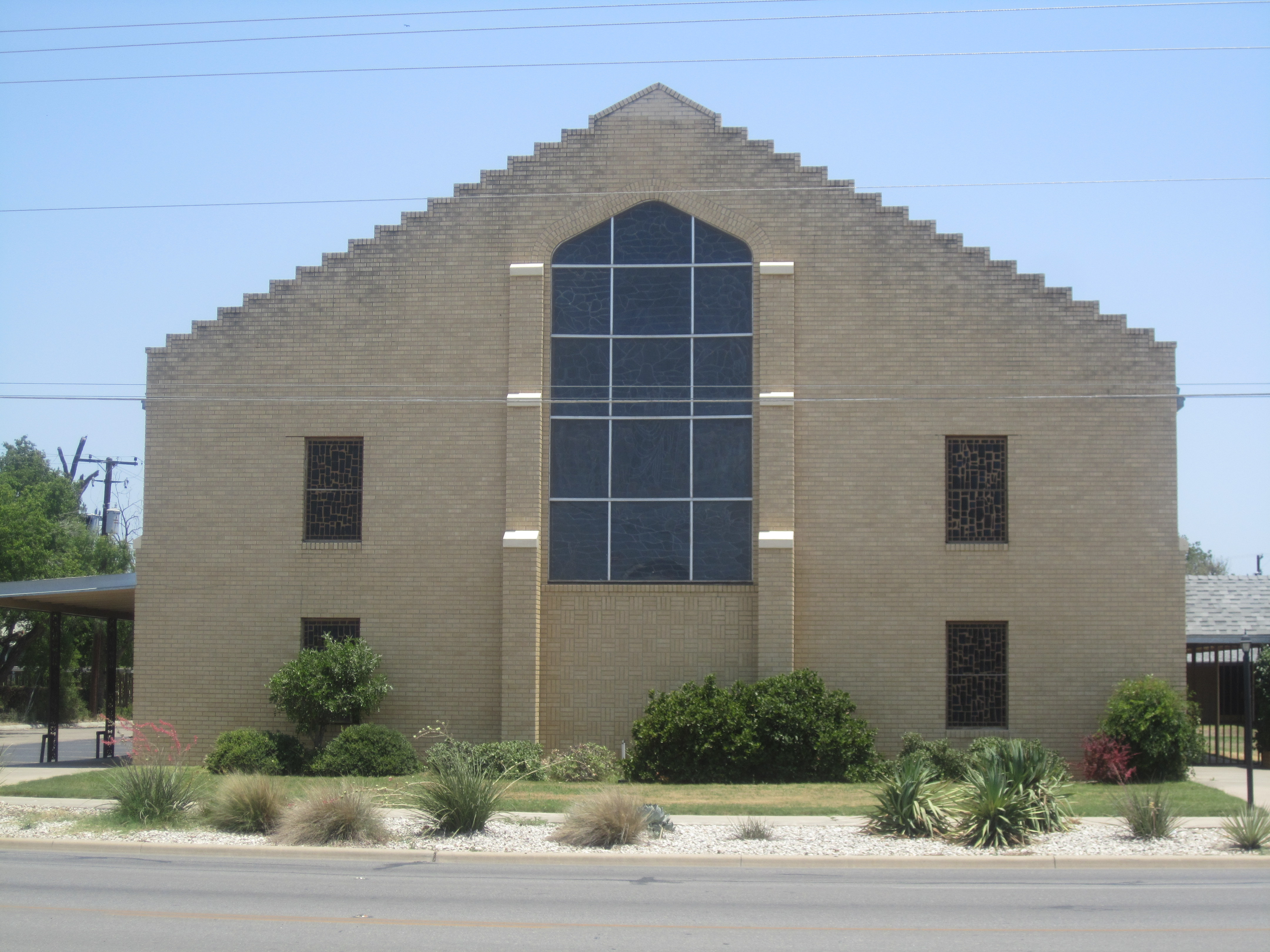
First Baptist Church at 308 W. Hondo (Highway 173)
