= Gus Rooney =

American journalist

Gus Rooney

Augustine Joseph Rooney (8 January 1892 – 21 December 1978) was an American sportswriter, baseball umpire, football referee, and sports announcer.

== Early life and education ==
Rooney was born in Boston on January 8, 1892. He attended Harvard College as a special student in 1919–1920.

== Career ==
Rooney worked as a sportswriter for The Boston Traveler for several decades. On April 13, 1926, he became the first man to call a Boston Red Sox game, where he announced the opening day game for WNAC. That season, he also announced some Boston Braves games as well.

He subsequently returned to his work as a sportswriter at the Traveler, retiring in 1938. In addition to sportswriting, his obituary notes that he was a publicist for Suffolk Downs when it opened.

== Death ==
Rooney died in Buzzards Bay, Cape Cod, on December 21, 1978, at the age of 86.
