= Deacon Meyers =

American baseball player (1899–1978)

- Pitcher
- Born: October 9, 1899; Columbia, Tennessee
- Died: July 15, 1978 (aged 78); Dayton, Ohio
- Batted: Right Threw: Right

Negro league baseball debut
- 1921, for the St. Louis Giants

Last appearance
- 1926, for the Dayton Marcos

Teams
- St. Louis Giants (1921); St. Louis Stars (1922–1925); Dayton Marcos (1926)

George Allen Meyers (October 9, 1899 – July 15, 1978), nicknamed "Deacon", was an American Negro league pitcher in the 1920s.

A native of Columbia, Tennessee, Meyers made his Negro leagues debut in 1921 with the St. Louis Giants. He played four seasons with the St. Louis Stars, and finished his career in 1926 with the Dayton Marcos. Meyers died in Dayton, Ohio in 1978 at age 78.
