= George Jeffcoat =

American baseball player (1913–1978)

- Pitcher
- Born: December 24, 1913; New Brookland, South Carolina, U.S.
- Died: October 13, 1978 (aged 64); Leesville, South Carolina, U.S.
- Batted: Right Threw: Right

MLB debut
- April 20, 1936, for the Brooklyn Dodgers

Last MLB appearance
- June 20, 1943, for the Boston Braves

MLB statistics
- Win–loss record: 7–11
- Earned run average: 4.51
- Strikeouts: 86
- Stats at Baseball Reference

Teams
- Brooklyn Dodgers (1936–1937, 1939); Boston Braves (1943)

George Edward Jeffcoat (December 24, 1913 – October 13, 1978) was an American professional baseball pitcher who played in the major leagues for the Brooklyn Dodgers and Boston Braves from 1936 to 1943.

Jeffcoat was the last player in the Dodgers franchise to wear jersey number 42 before Jackie Robinson. He wore the jersey during only the 1939 season.

Jeffcoat's younger brother, Hal Jeffcoat, also played in the major leagues as an outfielder and pitcher, and his nephew Harold George Jeffcoat pitched in the minor leagues.

Born in New Brookland, South Carolina, Jeffcoat died of a self-inflicted gunshot wound in Leesville, South Carolina in 1978.
