= Harold George Jeffcoat =

American academic administrator and former baseball player

Harold George Jeffcoat (born September 3, 1947) is the former president of Texas Wesleyan University and Millikin University and a former professional baseball player.

== Early life and athletic career ==
Jeffcoat was born in Nashville, Tennessee in 1947, the first child of professional baseball player Hal Jeffcoat and his wife Valma. Raised mainly in Tampa, Florida, he graduated from T.R. Robinson High School where he earned All-State honors as a quarterback and punter, and All-American in baseball. Drafted in the fourth round in the 1965 major league draft by the San Francisco Giants, he played in the minor leagues for ten years before retiring and returning to college to pursue a second career as a scholar and administrator.

== Educational career ==
Jeffcoat graduated with bachelor's and master's degrees from the University of South Florida, and later earned a doctorate in Educational Policy Studies and Evaluation from the University of Kentucky, and a law degree from the University of Leicester College of Law in the United Kingdom. Previously, he served as Vice Chancellor at the University of Missouri and Assistant Vice President at Purdue University in West Lafayette, Indiana. At the University of Missouri, Jeffcoat won grant support to create The European Union Center, an academic resource to study economic and agricultural issues in the European Union, serving as the Center's founding Director. At Purdue University, he helped lead the Purdue: Vision 21, a campaign that raised in excess of $330 million in support of the university academic programs and student scholarships. Jeffcoat's publications and research interest focus mainly on aspects of European Union Competition Law and the philosophy of law.

He served as tenured professor of law and humanities at Texas Wesleyan University, as its President and CEO from 2000-2010, and as President and CEO of Millikin University from 2011 until he retired in February 2013. In 2013 he joined the firm of Benz, Whaley and Flessner as Of counsel and retired from professional life in 2015. Jeffcoat now resides in summer in Halsnøya, Norway and winters in Kissimmee, Florida.
