= Hal Jeffcoat =

American baseball player (1924–2007)

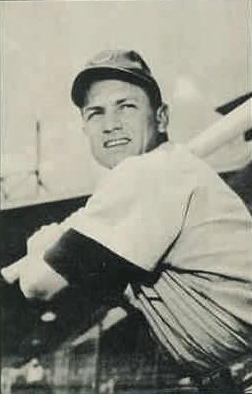
- Jeffcoat in 1953
- Outfielder / Pitcher
- Born: September 6, 1924; Columbia, South Carolina, U.S.
- Died: August 30, 2007 (aged 82); Tampa, Florida, U.S.
- Batted: Right Threw: Right

MLB debut
- April 20, 1948, for the Chicago Cubs

Last MLB appearance
- August 6, 1959, for the St. Louis Cardinals

MLB statistics
- Batting average: .248
- Home runs: 24
- Runs batted in: 188
- Win–loss record: 39–37
- Earned run average: 4.22
- Strikeouts: 239
- Stats at Baseball Reference

Teams
- Chicago Cubs (1948–1955); Cincinnati Redlegs / Reds (1956–1959); St. Louis Cardinals (1959)

Harold Bentley Jeffcoat (September 6, 1924 – August 30, 2007) was an American professional baseball player who forged a 12-season, 918-game Major League Baseball career, first as an outfielder (1948–1953) and then as a right-handed pitcher (1954–1959) as a member of the Chicago Cubs (1948–1955), Cincinnati Redlegs and Reds (1956–1959), and St. Louis Cardinals (1959). Born in West Columbia, South Carolina, he batted right-handed and was listed as 5 feet, 101/2 inches (1.8 meters) tall and 185 pounds (84 kg). He was the younger brother by 11 years of former major league pitcher George Jeffcoat.

Jeffcoat served in the United States Army during World War II before his baseball career began. A paratrooper, he saw combat during the Italian Campaign, where he was wounded; he was awarded a Purple Heart as a result. He entered professional baseball in 1946, and in his second year, he led the 1947 Double-A Southern Association in base hits (218) and knocked in 118 runs, despite striking only four home runs all season. His major league career began with the Cubs the following year.

== Career ==
As a hitter in the majors, in 1,963 at-bats, Jeffcoat scored 249 runs and collected 487 hits, including 95 doubles, 18 triples, 26 home runs, 696 total bases, 188 runs batted in, 49 stolen bases and 114 bases on balls received. He batted .248, with a .291 on-base percentage and .355 slugging percentage. Jeffcoat also had 47 sacrifice hits and two sacrifice flies. His best season as a position player came as a rookie in 1948, when he appeared in 132 games and batted .279 with 132 hits.

Jeffcoat converted from outfielder to pitcher in 1954 while playing for the Cubs. He worked in 43 games pitched that season, all but three in relief, and would log only four more games in the outfield for the remainder of his major league career. In his debut year on the mound, he won five of 11 decisions and earned seven saves, leading the club. In 104 innings pitched, he posted a poor 5.19 earned run average.

His most successful seasons as a pitcher came from 1955 through 1957. In 1955, he lowered his ERA to 2.95, then won eight of ten decisions in 1956 and recorded ten complete games as a starting pitcher in 1957. Overall, in 245 MLB games pitched, with 51 games started, he posted a win–loss record of 39–37, with 13 complete games, one shutout (a 3–0 six-hitter against the Brooklyn Dodgers at Ebbets Field on June 9, 1957), with 25 saves. In 697 innings pitched, he allowed 772 hits, 365 runs, 327 earned runs, 73 home runs and 257 walks, with 239 strikeouts, 22 hit batsmen, 13 wild pitches, 3,053 batters faced, 35 intentional walks and a 4.22 career earned run average. He is also remembered as the pitcher who beaned Brooklyn's Don Zimmer on June 23, 1956, fracturing Zimmer's cheekbone and ending his season.

== Personal life ==
Jeffcoat married Valma Viola Ala, whom he met while she served as a member of the Women’s Auxiliary Army Corps, in 1946. They had three sons together, including Harold George Jeffcoat, who would go on to have a ten-year minor league career before having an academic career during which he served as the president of Texas Wesleyan University and Millikin University.

Jeffcoat died in Tampa, Florida in 2007 after suffering a stroke.
