= Carlton Fisk's 1975 World Series home run =

Baseball play

In Game 6 of the 1975 World Series, the Boston Red Sox' Carlton Fisk hit a walk-off home run against the Cincinnati Reds at Fenway Park in Boston, Massachusetts, on October 21, 1975. Fisk's 12th-inning home run won the game for the Red Sox over the Reds by the final score of 7–6 to tie the series at three games each and force a deciding seventh game, and capped off what many consider to be the best World Series game ever played.

Facing Reds right-hander Pat Darcy, Fisk hit a long fly ball down the left field line. It appeared to be heading foul, but Fisk, after initially appearing unsure of whether or not to continue running to first base, famously jumped and waved his arms to the right as if to somehow direct the ball fair; the ball ricocheted off the foul pole. Fisk's "body English", "waving" the ball fair, was captured on a TV camera stationed in the scoreboard.

Though the home run remains to many the most iconic moment of the 1975 World Series, the Reds defeated the Red Sox in the following night's winner-take-all Game 7 on a tie-breaking single in the ninth inning, and prolonged the Red Sox' World Series title drought, which began in 1918 and eventually lasted until 2004.

== Background ==
During the 1975 baseball season, the Boston Red Sox had contended for the pennant during the previous season and entered the 1975 with Carlton Fisk and Rick Wise available for the full season. Rick Burleson established himself as the team's shortstop and performed better offensively in the major leagues than he had in the minors. The Red Sox also had two highly regarded rookies, Fred Lynn and Jim Rice. However, the team's collapse late in the 1974 season remained a concern for some fans.

At first most of the preseason talk had to do with the decision by Tony Conigliaro to try one more comeback and with the salary hassle concerning Luis Tiant, who felt he deserved more than the $70,000 he was earning and would not show up at Winter Haven, Florida, causing team owner Tom Yawkey to meet with "El Tiante", agree on a raise (to $90,000) and get the Sox pitching ace back in camp.

The likelihood of the Boston Red Sox winning became more unlikely after Fisk, returning from the serious knee injury of 1974, was hit in the right arm and broke it, resulting in Fisk being sidelined.

Fred Lynn attended the University of Southern California, where he played both baseball and football before focusing on baseball during his collegiate career. He was selected by the Boston Red Sox in the second round of the 1973 MLB draft. In 1975, Lynn earned both the American League Rookie of the Year and Most Valuable Player awards while contributing to the Red Sox’s World Series appearance. During his early major league career, Lynn and Jim Rice were often mentioned together as key young contributors in Boston’s lineup.

Rick Wise, back after a year of shoulder trouble and a broken finger, looked ready to boost a pitching staff, which already had Luis Tiant, Bill Lee, Reggie Cleveland, and Roger Moret. The bullpen also looked strong, with Dick Drago as the closer and Dick Pole and veteran Diego Seguí.

Additionally, the word on Tony Conigliaro was encouraging. Carl Yastrzemski was at first base, and after three short trials in previous years Cecil Cooper was going to make this team and potentially be the designated hitter.

With 1975, the Big Red Machine lineup solidified with the starting team of Johnny Bench (c), Tony Pérez (1b), Joe Morgan (2b), Dave Concepción (ss), Pete Rose (3b), Ken Griffey (rf), César Gerónimo (cf), and George Foster (lf). The starting pitchers included Don Gullett, Fred Norman, Gary Nolan, Jack Billingham, Pat Darcy, and Clay Kirby. Rawly Eastwick and Will McEnaney were the key closers with a combined 37 saves. Pedro Borbón and Clay Carroll filled in as stretchers between the starters and the finishers. However, this was not the lineup on opening day.

At that time, Rose still played in left field and Foster was not a starter, while John Vukovich, an off-season acquisition from the Milwaukee Brewers was the starting third baseman, replacing Dan Driessen. While Vuckovich was considered a strong defensive third baseman, he was also seen as a weak hitter, as was Denis Menke. In May, with the team off to a slow start and trailing the Dodgers, Sparky Anderson moved Rose to third base (a position where he had very little experience) and inserted Foster in left field to bat cleanup. Rose proved to be reliable on defense, while adding Foster to the outfield helped the offense. During the season, the Cincinnati Reds won 41 out of 50 games in one stretch.

=== Postseason ===
Cincinnati clinched the NL West with 108 victories, 20 games ahead of the Los Angeles Dodgers, then swept the Pittsburgh Pirates in three games to win the NL pennant.

After a great season of their own, the Red Sox swept the Oakland Athletics in three games in the American League Championship Series to advance to their first World Series since 1967. Carlton Fisk batted .417 in the ALCS.

Luis Tiant won Games 1 and 4 of the World Series but after five games, the Red Sox trailed the series 3 games to 2.

In the 10th inning of Game 3 of the 1975 World Series, in which Larry Barnett was working behind home plate, Cincinnati Reds hitter Ed Armbrister laid down a sacrifice bunt, and then collided with Boston Red Sox catcher Carlton Fisk, who was trying to field the ball. Fisk committed a throwing error on the play after colliding with Armbrister, which led to the Reds' winning run. Barnett declined to make an interference call on Armbrister, despite Boston's pleas. Barnett's failure to call an interference was criticized by NBC television broadcaster Curt Gowdy (a former Red Sox announcer), who was particularly harsh in his comments, reputedly leading NBC to drop Gowdy from its baseball coverage. Gowdy had reportedly been given the correct interpretation of the rule—that interference can be called only if a batter intentionally gets in the way of a fielder—by NBC Radio Producer Jay Scott (who was a Triple-A fill-in umpire at the time as well), but did not use it. Barnett later claimed he had received death threats on account of Gowdy's criticism.

More to the point, Tony Kubek, on the NBC telecast, immediately charged that Armbrister interfered (with the attempted forceout), even though home plate umpire Barnett did not agree. Later, Kubek got 1,000 letters dubbing him a Boston stooge. Prior to Game 2 of the 1986 World Series, NBC did a feature on replays narrated by Bob Costas. One of the plays cited by Costas was the Armbrister play, and Barnett and Costas both insisted that Barnett had made the correct call, although Barnett declared, "You won't find many people in Boston who believe it was the right call." Costas used the feature to condemn the suggested notion of instant replay to settle calls, noting that it was the "same kind of mentality that adds color to classic movies and calls it progress."

To this day, Major League Baseball maintains that Barnett made the correct call. In fact, the Professional Baseball Umpires Corporation (the organization that oversees all minor league baseball umpires) instructs and teaches its umpires to make the same call as Barnett did should the same incident occur in a future game. Specifically, Major League Baseball has interpreted Rule 7.09(l) as saying "a catcher trying to field a batted ball that remains in the immediate vicinity of the plate cannot be protected because of the right of the batter-runner to begin his advance to first. Barring an intentional action on the part of either player, contact in this instance is incidental, and is not interference..." (Jaksa/Roder Umpires' Manual, 1997 Edition. Pg. 57).

== The setup ==
=== World Series Game 6 ===
Game 6 was postponed three days because of rain. Bernie Carbo did not join his teammates for batting practice at Tufts University because he said he couldn't find it. He spent the early part of Game 6 working on his Louisville Slugger. "I’m sitting there and I’m whittling this bat, I took a lathe and took all the polish off. It's nice and smooth. Rick Wise is sitting next to me and says, ‘You know, you can’t use that bat. It doesn’t have an emblem on it.’ So as the game was going I took a magic marker and wrote ‘Louisville Slugger’ on it. That's how I kept myself amused."

Game 6 played at Fenway Park is thought to be one of the greatest, if not the greatest, game in postseason history. The Sox struck first on a 1st inning Fred Lynn blast. But by the 8th they were down 6–3 in the bottom of the eighth when pinch hitter Carbo with two outs and two batters on base, hit a three-run homer into the center field bleachers off Reds fireman Rawly Eastwick to tie the game. Bernie Carbo later said:

And I said, "Hey, I’m not going to hit. Juan Beníquez, grab a bat, you’re going to hit. Sparky's going to go to the lefthander because Sparky goes by the book." Darrell said, "Well, go up and stand on the on-deck circle." And they introduced me. So I’m still thinking Sparky will come out and take Rawly Eastwick out and go with Will McEnaney. But the umpire says, "C’mon, you’ve been announced, you’re hitting."

So I go into the batter's box. I ain't ready to hit. Next thing, strike one, strike two, ball one, ball two. Then he threw me a cut fastball, a little slider and I took it right out of Bench's glove – the ball just dribbled out. I step out and I’m thinking, "Aw man, I almost struck out. I was lucky."

I hit the next pitch to center field. I rounded first base and I saw César Gerónimo going back. Rounding second, I knew it was gone and I’m yelling to Pete Rose, "Don’t you wish you were this strong?" And Pete is yelling back, "Ain’t this fun, Bernie? This is what the World Series is about. This is fun."

Johnny Bench said after the game it looked like a Little Leaguer learning how to hit. Pete Rose said it was the worst swing he ever saw. Don Zimmer said he thought it was over. Rico Petrocelli said it looked like a pitcher who hurt his arm, trying to make a comeback as a hitter.

In the bottom of the ninth-inning, the score was tied 6–6 and the bases were loaded with no outs. Denny Doyle was on third base when Fred Lynn lifted a soft fly ball to short and shallow left field. After Reds left fielder George Foster made the catch, Doyle tagged up and attempted to score the winning run. He was thrown out at home plate, which inadvertently helped set the stage for Fisk's subsequent game-winning home run. After the game, Red Sox third-base coach Don Zimmer told the press, "I was yelling 'no, no, no' and with the crowd noise, he (Doyle) thought I was saying 'go, go, go.'" In a World Series that included five future Hall of Fame players, Doyle was the only player on either team to hit safely in all seven games.

In the top of the eleventh inning, Red Sox right fielder Dwight Evans made a spectacular catch of a Joe Morgan line drive and doubled off Ken Griffey Sr. at first base to preserve the tie. The Red Sox allowed two Reds singles in the 12th inning, but did not allow a run.

=== The play ===
Still tied entering the bottom of 12th inning, Carlton Fisk led off for the Red Sox against Reds reliever Pat Darcy, who had retired all six batters he had faced in the game to that point. On a 1–0 count, Fisk hit a sinker high and deep down the left field line. In one of baseball's most iconic moments, Fisk waved his arms as if trying to keep the ball fair, before the ball hit the foul pole and was called a home run, winning the game for Boston. Satch Davidson was the one who called it a home run, saying he had a better view of the ball than the umpires at third base and in left field.

The left foul pole, renamed "Fisk's Pole" in honor of his famous home run in the 1975 World Series, stands 310 feet away from home plate. During this time, cameramen covering baseball were instructed to follow the flight of the ball. In a 1999 interview, NBC cameraman Lou Gerard said that he had been distracted by a nearby rat. Unable to follow the ball, he kept the camera on Fisk instead. This play was perhaps the most important catalyst in getting camera operators to focus most of their attention on the players themselves.

== The calls ==
=== Ned Martin ===
During Martin's three decades with the Red Sox, he called the entire career of Hall-of-Famer Carl Yastrzemski, and was behind the microphone for some of baseball's most memorable moments, including the final win of the Red Sox "Impossible Dream" season of 1967, Carlton Fisk's game-winning home run off the foul pole in Game 6 of the 1975 World Series, Yastrzemski's 400th home run and 3000th base hit in 1979, and Roger Clemens' first 20-strikeout game on April 29, 1986. Martin was known for his erudition and literary references during broadcasts (quotations from Shakespeare were not uncommon) and for his signature exclamation, "Mercy!", after an exciting play.

The 1–0 delivery to Fisk. He swings...long drive, left field...if it stays fair, it's gone...HOME RUN! The Red Sox win! And the series is tied, three games apiece! – Martin on NBC Radio, calling Carlton Fisk's 12th inning game-winning home run at Fenway Park, October 21, 1975, off Pat Darcy of the Cincinnati Reds. (Audio)

Curt Gowdy was Martin's color man on that home run. This was the final World Series play-by-play assignment for Gowdy, who had been NBC's lead baseball announcer since 1966. Joe Garagiola would take over full-time as the network's main play-by-play voice for baseball the following season.

=== Dick Stockton ===
In 1965, he began his sportscasting career at local radio and television stations in Philadelphia. He became sports director at KDKA-TV in Pittsburgh in 1967, and moved to WBZ-TV and WBZ radio in Boston in 1971. Three years later, he began calling Boston Celtics telecasts for WBZ, and the following year he became the lead announcer for Boston Red Sox games on WSBK-TV. Stockton was part of the broadcast crew for NBC Sports' coverage of the 1975 World Series, and on television called Carlton Fisk's famous, game-winning home run in Game 6 of that series as follows:

There it goes! A long drive. . . . if it stays fair. . . . home run!

Stockton stayed silent as Fisk rounded the bases, waiting until he made his way into the Red Sox dugout before proclaiming: "We will have a seventh game in this 1975 World Series."

Lesley Visser and Stockton met at the sixth game of the 1975 World Series, where Stockton called Fisk's home run for NBC and Visser was covering the game for The Boston Globe. They eventually were married from 1983 until 2010.

== Aftermath ==
The homer arguably changed the way televised sports are covered; because camera operators missed a cue from the producer, the camera lingered on Fisk trying to "wave his home run fair." This image of Fisk proved so dramatic that "reaction shots" became standard fare in sports broadcasting.

Despite the dramatic victory, the Red Sox were not able to secure what would have been their first World Series title in 57 years. In Game 7 the following night, Red Sox took an early 3–0 lead on a RBI single by Carl Yastrzemski and two bases-loaded walks allowed by Reds starting pitcher Don Gullett in the third innning. Red Sox starter Bill Lee, meanwhile, held the Reds scoreless through five innings, but with a runner on base and two outs in the sixth inning, he threw a slow looping curve which he called a "Leephus pitch" or "space ball" to Reds first baseman Tony Pérez, who hit the ball over the Green Monster to bring the Reds within a run. The Reds tied the game in the seventh inning, and then scored the winning run in the ninth inning on Joe Morgan's RBI bloop single with two outs. Carlton Fisk said famously about the 1975 World Series, "We won that thing 3 games to 4." With a .370 batting average, 10 hits, 2 runs batted in, Cincinnati third baseman Pete Rose was named the World Series Most Valuable Player. The Game 7 victory gave the Reds their first championship in 35 years. The Reds have not lost a World Series game since Carlton Fisk's home run, a span of nine straight wins (Game 7 in 1975, and then two four-game sweeps in the 1976 and 1990 World Series.)

In 2003, ESPN ranked it the second-greatest World Series ever played, trailing only the 1991 series, while in 2020, Sam Miller of ESPN named it the best World Series ever.

The 1976 Red Sox never got on track under Darrell Johnson, who was replaced by Don Zimmer as manager on July 19. He led them to a winning record, but a disappointing third-place finish in the AL East with only 83 wins. The Red Sox would win more than 90 games in each of Zimmer's three full seasons (1977–1979) as manager, only the second time they had pulled off this feat since World War I. His 1978 team won 99 games, still the fourth-best record in franchise history.

In 1976, the Reds won the NL West by ten games over the archrival Dodgers. They went undefeated in the postseason, sweeping the Philadelphia Phillies (winning Game 3 in their final at-bat) to return to the World Series. They continued to dominate by sweeping the Yankees in the newly renovated Yankee Stadium, the first World Series games played in Yankee Stadium since 1964. This was only the second ever sweep of the proud Yankees in the World Series. In winning the Series, the Reds became the first NL team since the 1921–22 New York Giants to win back-to-back World Series championships.

Fisk was among the top offensive catchers in the American League in his eight full seasons with the Boston Red Sox. His best year in Boston was in 1977, when he hit .315 with 26 home runs and 102 runs batted in.

Facing the rival New York Yankees in the 1978 AL East Playoff, Fisk went 1-for-3 with a single in Boston's 5–4 loss to the Yankees. Some fans attributed Boston's 1978 loss to a rib injury sustained by Fisk. The same injury left Fisk on the sidelines for several games during the 1979 season, a year in which his primary position was designated hitter.

Fisk was reportedly among a group of several Red Sox players who lobbied Boston management for players to be paid what they deserved, which made him none too popular with Haywood Sullivan, the Boston general manager. When Fisk's contract expired at the end of the 1980 season, Sullivan in fact mailed him a new contract, but put it in the mail one day after the contractual deadline. As a result, Fisk was technically a free agent and he signed a $3.5 million deal with the Chicago White Sox, beginning with the 1981 season.

In 11 years with the Boston Red Sox, Fisk was selected to seven All-Star games, and batted .284 with 161 home runs and 568 RBI. He nearly had more RBIs than strikeouts, striking out only 588 times in 4353 plate appearances with the Red Sox, with an OBP of .356.

Fisk's home run occurred 11 years and 6 days after the previous walk-off home run in the World Series, hit by Mickey Mantle for the Yankees in Game 3 of the 1964 Series. It would be just under 13 years until the next World Series walk-off homer, hit by Kirk Gibson in Game 1 of the 1988 Series. Those are the two longest stretches between walk-off home runs in the World Series since the first one was hit in 1949.

Game 6 of the 1975 World Series became, at the time, the longest post-season game in terms of innings to be decided by a walk-off home run. No walk-off home run would be hit in the 12th inning or later of a post-season game until Tony Peña hit one in the 13th inning for Cleveland against the Red Sox in Game 1 of the 1995 American League Division Series. No walk-off home run would be hit in an inning later than the 12th inning of a World Series game until the Los Angeles Dodgers' Max Muncy homered in the 18th inning of Game 3 of the 2018 World Series, also against the Red Sox (Álex González of the Florida Marlins also hit a walk-off homer in the 12th inning, in Game 4 of the 2003 World Series against the New York Yankees.)

=== The Fisk Foul Pole ===
On June 13, 2005, the Red Sox honored Carlton Fisk and the 12th-inning home run that won Game 6 of the 1975 World Series by naming the left field foul pole, which the famous home run contacted, the Fisk Foul Pole. In a pregame ceremony from the Monster Seats, Fisk was cheered by the Fenway Park crowd while the shot was replayed to the strains of Handel's Hallelujah Chorus, the song longtime Fenway Park organist John Kiley originally played following the home run. The Red Sox scheduled the ceremony to coincide with an interleague series against the Cincinnati Reds, who were making their first trip back to Fenway Park since the '75 Series.

30 years later, the video of Fisk trying to wave the ball fair remains one of the game's enduring images. At precisely 12:34 am. ET early on the morning of October 22, 1975, Fisk drove a 1–0 fastball from Cincinnati right-hander Pat Darcy into the air, heading down the left-field line. "The ball only took about two and half seconds", recalled Fisk. "It seemed like I was jumping and waving for more than two and a half seconds." The ball then caromed off the yellow pole, ending one of the most dramatic World Series games ever played and giving the Red Sox a 7–6 win over the Reds in 12 hard-fought innings.

On the field, Fisk threw out the ceremonial first pitch to his former batterymate Luis Tiant. From now on, like the Pesky Pole down the right-field line, the left-field pole will officially be called the Fisk Foul Pole. The idea was the inspiration of the countless fans who contacted the Red Sox about recognizing the historic moment. Fenway's right field foul pole, which is just 302 feet (92 m) from the plate, is named Pesky's Pole for former Red Sox shortstop Johnny Pesky. Mel Parnell named the pole after Pesky in 1948 when he won a game with a home run just inside the right-field pole.

On October 19, 2020, Thomas Boswell announced in his Washington Post column that he would not be covering the World Series for the first time since 1975. The 72-year-old Boswell cited health concerns related to the COVID-19 pandemic, saying that it was too risky for someone at his age to make the trip. Boswell pointed out in his column that at the time, the 1975 World Series was considered the greatest World Series ever played, largely due to the dramatic game six that ended with Carlton Fisk's historic home run. The drama of the series convinced him to remain a journalist with the Post and, in his column, he speculates "Where would I be today if Fisk’s ball had gone foul?"
