= 1974 Cincinnati Reds season =

1974 Cincinnati Reds
- League: National League
- Division: West
- Ballpark: Riverfront Stadium
- City: Cincinnati
- Record: 98–64 (.605)
- Divisional place: 2nd
- Owners: Louis Nippert
- General managers: Bob Howsam
- Managers: Sparky Anderson
- Television: WLWT (Charlie Jones, Woody Woodward)
- Radio: WLW (Marty Brennaman, Joe Nuxhall)

The 1974 Cincinnati Reds season was the 105th season for the franchise in Major League Baseball, and their 5th and 4th full season at Riverfront Stadium. The Reds finished in second place in the National League West with a record of 98–64, four games behind the NL West and pennant-winning Los Angeles Dodgers. The Reds were managed by Sparky Anderson and played their home games at Riverfront Stadium.

The Reds' 98 victories were second-best in all of Major League baseball to the Dodgers' 102 victories. The Dodgers had finished in second place from 1970 to 1973: in three of those years the Reds won the NL West, (except for 1971, when the San Francisco Giants won). In the 1973-74 offseason, the Dodgers added center fielder Jimmy Wynn in a trade from Houston and acquired future Cy Young Award winning reliever Mike Marshall from Montreal. The Reds added a solid starter in 12-game winner Clay Kirby in the offseason.

== Pennant Race ==
Just as they had done the previous season, the Dodgers started hot and built a large lead on the Reds in the division, due largely to their head-to-head success against the Reds, winning nine of their first ten games against Cincinnati. After losing 6–3 to the Dodgers on August 5, the Reds trailed the Dodgers by 7 1/2 games despite a solid 66–45 record. By August 15, the Reds had cut the lead to 1 1/2 games after winning the first two of a three-game set at Dodger Stadium marking 9 losses in 11 games for Los Angeles. In the third game, Wynn hit a seventh-inning grand slam to break open a tight game as the Dodgers rallied to a 7–1 victory, which helped keep the Dodgers ahead in the NL West. The Reds would get no closer than two games the rest of the season.

Johnny Bench put up one of his best seasons (career-highs in 108 runs scored and 160 games played, 33 home runs, 129 RBI and 315 total bases) to finish fourth in the NL MVP voting to winner Steve Garvey, runner-up Lou Brock, and Marshall. Wynn was fifth.

The 1974 season also marked the first with future Hall of Fame broadcaster Marty Brennaman. Brennaman replaced another nationally known broadcaster, Al Michaels, who moved to San Francisco to take the same position with the Giants.

== Offseason ==
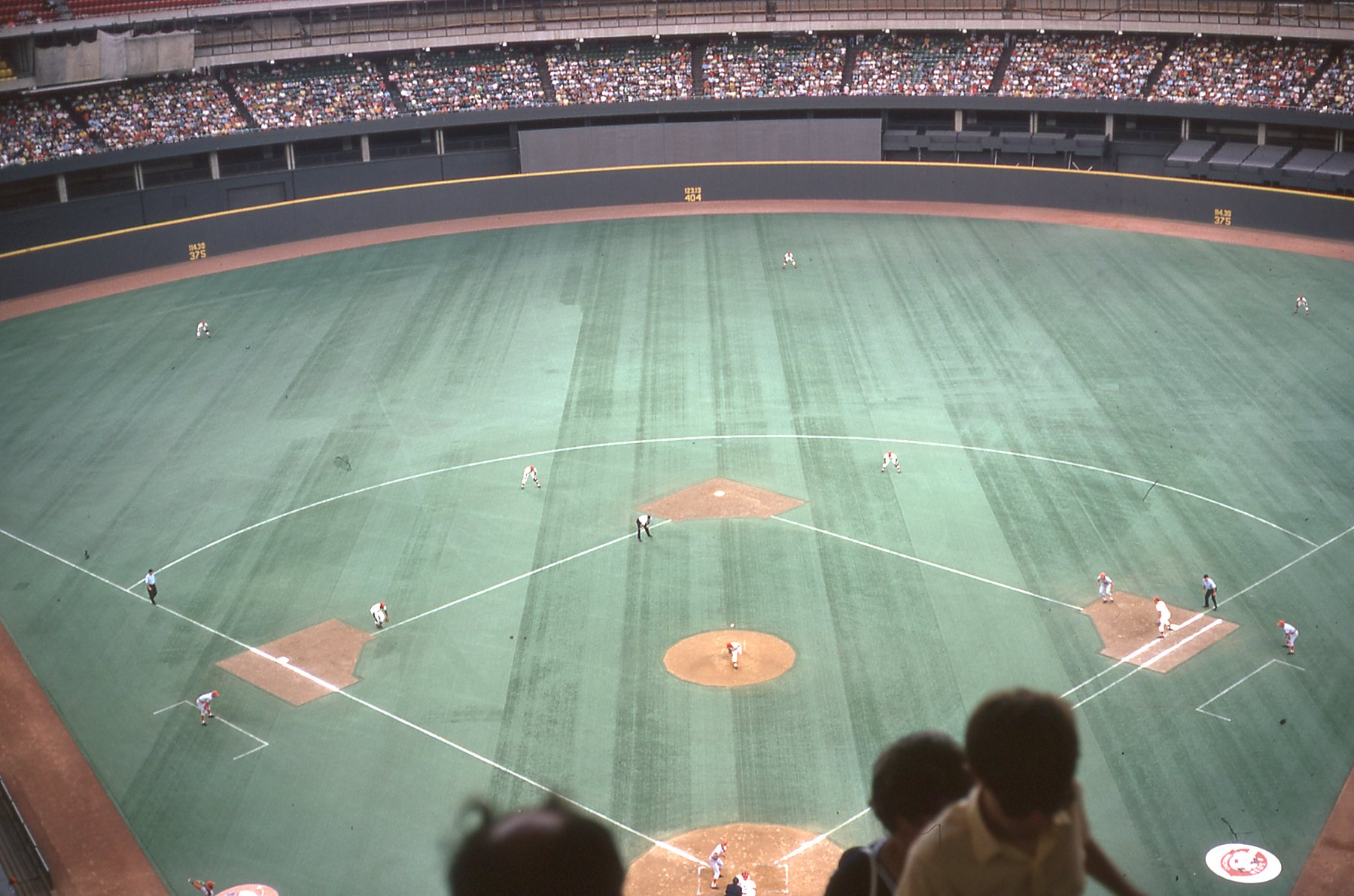
The Reds play at Riverfront Stadium, 1974

- December 3, 1973: Mario Soto was signed as an amateur free agent by the Reds.
- December 4, 1973: Ross Grimsley and Wally Williams (minors) were traded by the Reds to the Baltimore Orioles for Merv Rettenmund, Junior Kennedy and Bill Wood (minors).
- December 12, 1973: Steve Blateric was traded by the Reds to the Cleveland Indians for Roger Freed.
- Prior to 1974 season: Dan Dumoulin was signed as an amateur free agent by the Reds.

== Regular season ==
=== Season standings ===
NL West
Team	W	L	Pct.	GB	Home	Road
Los Angeles Dodgers	102	60	.630	—	52‍–‍29	50‍–‍31
Cincinnati Reds	98	64	.605	4	50‍–‍31	48‍–‍33
Atlanta Braves	88	74	.543	14	46‍–‍35	42‍–‍39
Houston Astros	81	81	.500	21	46‍–‍35	35‍–‍46
San Francisco Giants	72	90	.444	30	37‍–‍44	35‍–‍46
San Diego Padres	60	102	.370	42	36‍–‍45	24‍–‍57

=== Record vs. opponents ===
1974 National League record Sources:
Team	ATL	CHC	CIN	HOU	LAD	MON	NYM	PHI	PIT	SD	SF	STL
Atlanta	—	4–8	7–11–1	6–12	8–10	9–3	8–4	8–4	4–8	17–1	8–10	9–3
Chicago	8–4	—	5–7	4–8	2–10	5–13	8–10	8–10	9–9	6–6	6–6	5–13
Cincinnati	11–7–1	7–5	—	14–4	6–12	6–6	9–3	8–4	8–4	12–6	11–7	6–6
Houston	12–6	8–4	4–14	—	5–13	6–6	6–6	6–6	5–7	7–11	10–8	8–4
Los Angeles	10–8	10–2	12–6	13–5	—	8–4	5–7	6–6	4–8	16–2	12–6	6–6
Montreal	3–9	13–5	6–6	6–6	4–8	—	9–9	11–7	9–9	6–6	4–8	8–9
New York	4–8	10–8	3–9	6–6	7–5	9–9	—	7–11	7–11	6–6	6–6	6–12
Philadelphia	4-8	10–8	4–8	6–6	6–6	7–11	11–7	—	10–8	5–7	8–4	9–9
Pittsburgh	8–4	9–9	4–8	7–5	8–4	9–9	11–7	8–10	—	9–3	8–4	7–11
San Diego	1–17	6–6	6–12	7–11	2–16	6–6	6–6	7–5	3–9	—	11–7	5–7
San Francisco	10–8	6–6	7–11	8–10	6–12	8–4	6–6	4–8	4–8	7–11	—	6–6
St. Louis	3–9	13–5	6–6	4–8	6–6	9–8	12–6	9–9	11–7	7–5	6–6	—

=== Roster ===
1974 Cincinnati Reds
Roster
Pitchers: 44 Dick Baney; 43 Jack Billingham; 34 Pedro Borbón; 36 Clay Carroll; 51 Tom Carroll; 58 Pat Darcy; 49 Rawly Eastwick; 35 Don Gullett; 21 Tom Hall; 31 Clay Kirby; 37 Will McEnaney; 47 Mike McQueen; 45 Roger Nelson; 32 Fred Norman; 46 Pat Osburn	Catchers: 5 Johnny Bench; 6 Hal King; 9 Bill Plummer; Infielders: 12 Darrel Chaney; 13 Dave Concepción; 22 Dan Driessen; 28 Roger Freed; 16 Phil Gagliano; 11 Junior Kennedy; 25 Ray Knight; 23 Andy Kosco; 8 Joe Morgan; 24 Tony Pérez	Outfielders: 33 Ed Armbrister; 17 Terry Crowley; 15 George Foster; 20 César Gerónimo; 30 Ken Griffey; 26 Merv Rettenmund; 14 Pete Rose	Manager: 10 Sparky Anderson; Coaches: 2 Alex Grammas; 18 Ted Kluszewski; 3 George Scherger; 4 Larry Shepard

== Player stats ==
= Indicates team leader

=== Batting ===
==== Starters by position ====
Note: Pos = Position; G = Games played; AB = At bats; H = Hits; Avg. = Batting average; HR = Home runs; RBI = Runs batted in

Pos	Player	G	AB	H	Avg.	HR	RBI
C	Johnny Bench	160	621	174	.280	33	129
1B	Tony Pérez	158	596	158	.265	28	101
2B	Joe Morgan	149	512	150	.293	22	67
SS	Dave Concepción	160	594	167	.281	14	82
3B	Dan Driessen	150	470	132	.281	7	56
LF	Pete Rose	163	652	185	.284	3	51
CF	César Gerónimo	150	474	133	.281	7	54
RF	Ken Griffey	88	227	57	.251	2	19

==== Other batters ====
Note: G = Games played; AB = At bats; H = Hits; Avg. = Batting average; HR = Home runs; RBI = Runs batted in

Player	G	AB	H	Avg.	HR	RBI
George Foster	106	276	73	.264	7	41
Merv Rettenmund	80	208	45	.216	6	28
Darrel Chaney	117	135	27	.200	2	16
Terry Crowley	84	125	30	.240	1	20
Bill Plummer	50	120	27	.225	2	10
Andy Kosco	33	37	7	.189	0	5
Phil Gagliano	46	31	2	.065	0	0
Junior Kennedy	22	19	3	.158	0	0
Hal King	20	17	3	.176	0	3
Ray Knight	14	11	2	.182	0	2
Ed Armbrister	9	7	2	.286	0	0
Roger Freed	6	6	2	.333	1	3

=== Pitching ===
==== Starting pitchers ====
Note: G = Games pitched; IP = Innings pitched; W = Wins; L = Losses; ERA = Earned run average; SO = Strikeouts

Player	G	IP	W	L	ERA	SO
Don Gullett	36	243.0	17	11	3.04	183
Clay Kirby	36	230.2	12	9	3.28	160
Jack Billingham	36	212.1	19	11	3.94	103
Fred Norman	35	186.1	13	12	3.14	141
Roger Nelson	14	85.1	4	4	3.38	42
Tom Carroll	16	78.1	4	3	3.68	37

==== Other pitchers ====
Note: G = Games pitched; IP = Innings pitched; W = Wins; L = Losses; ERA = Earned run average; SO = Strikeouts

Player	G	IP	W	L	ERA	SO
Pat Darcy	6	17.0	1	0	3.71	14

==== Relief pitchers ====
Note: G = Games pitched; W = Wins; L = Losses; SV = Saves; ERA = Earned run average; SO = Strikeouts

Player	G	W	L	SV	ERA	SO
Pedro Borbón	73	10	7	14	3.24	53
Clay Carroll	57	12	5	6	2.15	46
Tom Hall	40	3	1	1	4.08	48
Dick Baney	22	1	0	1	5.49	12
Will McEnaney	24	2	1	2	4.33	12
Rawly Eastwick	8	0	0	2	2.04	14
Mike McQueen	10	0	0	0	5.40	5
Pat Osburn	6	0	0	0	8.00	4

== Farm system ==
Level	Team	League	Manager
AAA	Indianapolis Indians	American Association	Vern Rapp
AA	Trois-Rivières Aigles	Eastern League	Jim Snyder
A	Tampa Tarpons	Florida State League	Russ Nixon
A-Short Season	Seattle Rainiers	Northwest League	Greg Riddoch
Rookie	Billings Mustangs	Pioneer League	Jim Hoff
