= 1975 Cincinnati Reds season =

1975 Cincinnati Reds
- World Series champions National League champions National League West champions
- League: National League
- Division: West
- Ballpark: Riverfront Stadium
- City: Cincinnati
- Record: 108–54 (.667)
- Divisional place: 1st place
- Owner: Louis Nippert
- General manager: Bob Howsam
- Manager: Sparky Anderson
- Television: WLWT (Ken Coleman, Woody Woodward)
- Radio: WLW (Marty Brennaman, Joe Nuxhall)

The 1975 Cincinnati Reds season was the 106th season for the franchise in Major League Baseball, and their 6th and 5th full season at Riverfront Stadium. The Reds dominated the league all season, and won the National League West Division with a record of 108 wins and 54 losses, the best record in MLB and finished 20 games ahead of the Los Angeles Dodgers. The Reds went on to win the NLCS by defeating the Pittsburgh Pirates in three straight games, and the World Series in seven games over the Boston Red Sox. The Reds were managed by Sparky Anderson and played their home games at Riverfront Stadium. It was the first World Series championship for Cincinnati since 1940. The 1975 Reds are one of the few teams to consistently challenge the 1927 New York Yankees for the title of the best team in major league history. The Reds went 64–17 at home in 1975, which remains the best home record ever by a National League team. It is currently the second-best home record in MLB history, behind the 1961 Yankees, who went 65-16.

== Offseason ==
- October 25, 1974: Andy Kosco was released by the Reds.
- October 25, 1974: Phil Gagliano was released by the Reds.
- January 2, 1975: Joe Henderson was purchased by the Reds from the Chicago White Sox.

== Regular season ==
The 1975 Reds clinched a playoff appearance on September 7, the earliest clinch date of any MLB team in a 162-game season.

Joe Morgan was the National League's Most Valuable Player in 1975.

=== Season standings ===
NL West
Team	W	L	Pct.	GB	Home	Road
Cincinnati Reds	108	54	.667	—	64‍–‍17	44‍–‍37
Los Angeles Dodgers	88	74	.543	20	49‍–‍32	39‍–‍42
San Francisco Giants	80	81	.497	27½	46‍–‍35	34‍–‍46
San Diego Padres	71	91	.438	37	38‍–‍43	33‍–‍48
Atlanta Braves	67	94	.416	40½	37‍–‍43	30‍–‍51
Houston Astros	64	97	.398	43½	37‍–‍44	27‍–‍53

=== Record vs. opponents ===
1975 National League record Sources:
Team	ATL	CHC	CIN	HOU	LAD	MON	NYM	PHI	PIT	SD	SF	STL
Atlanta	—	5–7	3–15	12–6	8–10	8–4	4–8	5–7	4–8	7–11	8–9	3–9
Chicago	7–5	—	1–11	7–5	5–7	9–9	7–11	12–6	6–12	5–7	5–7	11–7
Cincinnati	15–3	11–1	—	13–5	8–10	8–4	8–4	7–5	6–6	11–7	13–5	8–4
Houston	6–12	5–7	5–13	—	6–12	8–4	4–8	6–6	6–5	9–9	5–13	4–8–1
Los Angeles	10–8	7–5	10–8	12–6	—	5–7	6–6	7–5	5–7	11–7	10–8	5–7
Montreal	4–8	9–9	4–8	4–8	7–5	—	10–8	7–11	7–11	7–5	5–7	11–7
New York	8–4	11–7	4–8	8–4	6–6	8–10	—	7–11	5–13	8–4	8–4	9–9
Philadelphia	7-5	6–12	5–7	6–6	5–7	11–7	11–7	—	11–7	7–5	7–5	10–8
Pittsburgh	8–4	12–6	6–6	5–6	7–5	11–7	13–5	7–11	—	8–4	5–7	10–8
San Diego	11–7	7–5	7–11	9–9	7–11	5–7	4–8	5–7	4–8	—	8–10	4–8
San Francisco	9–8	7–5	5–13	13–5	8–10	7–5	4–8	5–7	7–5	10–8	—	5–7
St. Louis	9–3	7–11	4–8	8–4–1	7–5	7–11	9–9	8–10	8–10	8–4	7–5	—

=== Notable transactions ===
- April 8, 1975: Roger Freed was purchased from the Reds by the Sultanes de Monterrey.
- May 6, 1975: Doug Corbett was signed as a free agent by the Reds.

=== Roster ===
1975 Cincinnati Reds
Roster
Pitchers: 43 Jack Billingham; 34 Pedro Borbón; 36 Clay Carroll; 51 Tom Carroll; 44 Pat Darcy; 49 Rawly Eastwick; 35 Don Gullett; 21 Tom Hall; 31 Clay Kirby; 37 Will McEnaney; 38 Gary Nolan; 32 Fred Norman	Catchers: 5 Johnny Bench; 9 Bill Plummer; 55 Don Werner; Infielders: 12 Darrel Chaney; 13 Dave Concepción; 17 Terry Crowley; 22 Dan Driessen; 23 Doug Flynn; 8 Joe Morgan; 24 Tony Pérez; 14 Pete Rose; 16 John Vukovich	Outfielders: 33 Ed Armbrister; 15 George Foster; 20 César Gerónimo; 30 Ken Griffey; 26 Merv Rettenmund	Manager: 10 Sparky Anderson; Coaches: 2 Alex Grammas; 18 Ted Kluszewski; 3 George Scherger; 4 Larry Shepard

== Game log ==
=== Regular season ===
Legend
	Reds win
	Reds loss
	Postponement
	Clinched division
**Bold**	Reds team member

1975 regular season game log: 108–54 (Home: 64–17; Away: 44–37)
April: 12–11 (Home: 7–2; Away: 5–9)

#	Date	Time (ET)	Opponent	Score	Win	Loss	Save	Time of Game	Attendance	Record	Box/ Streak
1	April 7	2:30 p.m. EST	Dodgers	**W** 2–1 (14)	**Darcy** (1–0)	Hough (0–1)	—	3:23	52,526	1–0	W1
2	April 9	8:05 p.m. EST	Dodgers	**W** 4–3	**Borbón** (1–0)	Marshall (0–1)	—	2:40	15,554	2–0	W2
3	April 10	8:05 p.m. EST	Dodgers	**W** 7–6	**C. Carroll** (1–0)	Hough (0–2)	—	2:43	20,550	3–0	W3
7	April 14	8:15 p.m. EST	@ Dodgers	L 2–5	Rau (1–0)	**Billingham** (0–1)	Marshall (1)	2:22	45,502	4–3	L1
8	April 15	10:30 p.m. EST	@ Dodgers	L 1–3	Sutton (2–0)	**Kirby** (0–1)	—	2:05	31,663	4–4	L2
9	April 16	10:30 p.m. EST	@ Dodgers	L 6–7	Marshall (1–1)	**C. Carroll** (1–1)	—	3:06	36,578	4–5	L3
10	April 17	4:15 p.m. EST	@ Dodgers	L 4–5 (11)	Marshall (2–1)	**C. Carroll** (1–2)	—	3:01	27,835	4–6	L4

May: 16–10 (Home: 11–3; Away: 5–7)

#	Date	Time (ET)	Opponent	Score	Win	Loss	Save	Time of Game	Attendance	Record	Box/ Streak
—	May 12	7:35 p.m. EDT	@ Phillies	Postponed (rain); Makeup: May 15							
33	May 13	7:35 p.m. EDT	@ Phillies	L 0–4	Underwood (4–3)	**Nolan** (1–3)	—	2:12	11,634	18–15	L2
34	May 14	7:35 p.m. EDT	@ Phillies	L 0–4	Carlton (2–4)	**Darcy** (1–2)	—	2:30	30,908	18–15	L3
35 (1)	May 15	5:35 p.m. EDT	@ Phillies	L 3–6	McGraw (2–0)	**Gullett** (4–2)	—	2:20	—	18–16	L4
36 (2)	May 15	8:20 p.m. EDT	@ Phillies	L 3–5	Garber (2–2)	**Carroll** (3–4)	McGraw (3)	2:37	24,038	18–17	L5
42	May 23	8:05 p.m. EDT	Phillies	**W** 5–2	**Nolan** (3–3)	Christenson (0–1)	**Carroll** (3)	2:05	36,197	22–20	W2
43	May 24	7:05 p.m. EDT	Phillies	**W** 3–2 (11)	**Carroll** (4–4)	McGraw (2–2)	—	3:20	36,165	23–20	W3
44	May 25	2:15 p.m. EDT	Phillies	**W** 4–3	**Kirby** (3–3)	Lonborg (3–2)	**Eastwick** (1)	2:29	25,72636,165	24–20	W4

June: 21–7 (Home: 12–4; Away: 9–3)

#	Date	Time (ET)	Opponent	Score	Win	Loss	Save	Time of Game	Attendance	Record	Box/ Streak
—	June 2	7:35 p.m. EDT	@ Pirates	Postponed (rain); Makeup: August 22							
51	June 3	7:35 p.m. EDT	@ Pirates	**W** 8–4	**Nolan** (5–3)	Moose (0–2)	—	2:26	9,438	30–21	W3
52	June 4	7:35 p.m. EDT	@ Pirates	L 1–2	Reuss (5–4)	**Norman** (2–2)	Hernández (1)	2:25	13,754	30–22	L1
57	June 9	8:30 p.m. EDT	Pirates	L 2–9	Reuss (6–4)	**Norman** (2–3)	—	2:08	22,555	34–23	L1
58	June 10	8:05 p.m. EDT	Pirates	L 5–9	McDowell (2–1)	**Darcy** (1–3)	Hernández (2)	2:45	19,107	34–24	L2

July: 20–9 (Home: 14–3; Away: 6–6)

#	Date	Time (ET)	Opponent	Score	Win	Loss	Save	Time of Game	Attendance	Record	Box/ Streak
84	July 7	8:25 p.m. EDT	Phillies	**W** 7–3	**Darcy** (4–5)	Carlton (7–7)	—	2:30	25,096	55–29	W4
85	July 8	8:05 p.m. EDT	Phillies	**W** 2–1	**Nolan** (8–5)	Underwood (9–6)	**Eastwick** (4)	2:14	28,479	56–29	W5
86	July 9	8:05 p.m. EDT	Phillies	**W** 9–7	**Borbón** (5–1)	Garber (7–5)	—	2:25	28,789	57–29	W6
—	July 15	8:30 p.m. EDT	**46th All-Star Game in Milwaukee, WI**								
94	July 20	1:35 p.m. EDT	@ Phillies	L 4–11	Underwood (10–7)	**Kirby** (7–4)	Garber (7)	2:51	44,134	62–32	L2
95	July 21	7:35 p.m. EDT	@ Phillies	**W** 10–4	**Darcy** (5–5)	Schueler (3–2)	—	2:48	43,698	63–32	W1
99 (1)	July 25	5:35 p.m. EDT	Dodgers	L 3–4	Messersmith (13–8)	**Carroll** (5–5)	Marshall (7)	2:33	—	64–35	L1
100 (2)	July 25	8:33 p.m. EDT	Dodgers	**W** 6–3	**Darcy** (6–5)	Marshall (6–9)	**Borbón** (4)	2:06	51,087	65–35	W1
101	July 26	2:15 p.m. EDT	Dodgers	**W** 5–3	**Billingham** (11–5)	Rau (8–8)	**Eastwick** (9)	2:33	50,236	66–35	W2
102	July 27	2:15 p.m. EDT	Dodgers	L 3–5	Sutton (14–9)	**T. Carroll** (3–1)	Marshall (8)	2:38	50,609	66–36	L1

August: 21–8 (Home: 11–2; Away: 10–6)

#	Date	Time (ET)	Opponent	Score	Win	Loss	Save	Time of Game	Attendance	Record	Box/ Streak
107	August 1	10:30 p.m. EDT	@ Dodgers	L 3–5 (10)	Hough (1–4)	**Borbón** (6–3)	—	2:45	50,331	69–38	L1
108	August 2	10:00 p.m. EDT	@ Dodgers	**W** 1–0	**T. Carroll** (4–1)	Messersmith (13–10)	**C. Carroll** (5)	2:34	52,015	70–38	W1
109	August 3	4:00 p.m. EDT	@ Dodgers	**W** 3–1	**Darcy** (8–5)	Rau (9–9)	**Eastwick** (10)	2:15	51,667	71–38	W2
118	August 14	8:05 p.m. EDT	Pirates	**W** 6–1	**Nolan** (11–6)	Reuss (12–9)	—	1:54	40,062	79–39	W5
119	August 15	8:15 p.m. EDT	Pirates	**W** 8–3	**Norman** (8–3)	Rooker (8–9)	—	2:20	45,003	80–39	W6
120	August 16	8:05 p.m. EDT	Pirates	**W** 5–3	**Billingham** (14–5)	Candelaria (6–3)	**Eastwick** (13)	2:15	51,286	81–39	W7
121	August 17	2:15 p.m. EDT	Pirates	**W** 3–1	**Darcy** (9–5)	Kison (9–10)	**Eastwick** (14)	1:56	50,121	82–39	W8
125 (1)	August 22	6:05 p.m. EDT	@ Pirates	L 2–7	Demery (6–3)	**Billingham** (14–6)	—	2:41	—	83–42	L3
126 (2)	August 22	9:11 p.m. EDT	@ Pirates	L 2–4	Candelaria (7–3)	**McEnaney** (4–2)	Giusti (14)	2:04	46,756	83–43	L4
127	August 23	2:15 p.m. EDT	@ Pirates	**W** 12–7	**Kirby** (9–4)	Kison (9–11)	**Eastwick** (16)	3:21	32,068	84–43	W1
128	August 24	1:35 p.m. EDT	@ Pirates	L 1–5	Reuss (14–9)	**Nolan** (11–8)	—	1:53	35,598	84–44	L1

September: 18–9 (Home: 9–3; Away: 9–6)

#	Date	Time (ET)	Opponent	Score	Win	Loss	Save	Time of Game	Attendance	Record	Box/ Streak
138	September 3	8:05 p.m. EDT	Dodgers	**W** 13–2	**Nolan** (13–8)	Messersmith (15–14)	—	2:36	27,881	92–46	W2
139	September 4	8:05 p.m. EDT	Dodgers	L 2–3	Rau (13–9)	**Kirby** (9–5)	—	2:14	29,512	92–47	L1
145	September 10	10:30 p.m. EDT	@ Dodgers	L 2–3	Hooton (16–9)	**Eastwick** (5–3)	—	2:25	27,432	96–49	L2
146	September 11	10:30 p.m. EDT	@ Dodgers	L 2–5	Rhoden (2–2)	**Billingham** (15–8)	—	2:16	27,640	96–50	L3

=== Postseason Game log ===
Legend
	Reds win
	Reds loss
	Postponement
**Bold**	Reds team member

1975 Postseason game log: 7–3 (Home: 4–1; Away: 3–2)
NL Championship Series vs. Pittsburgh Pirates 3–0 (Home: 2–0; Away: 1–0)

#	Date	Time (ET)	Opponent	Score	Win	Loss	Save	Time of Game	Attendance	Series	Box/ Streak
1	October 4	4:00 p.m. EDT	Pirates	**W** 8–3	**Gullett** (1–0)	Reuss (0–1)	—	3:00	54,633	CIN 1–0	W1
2	October 5	4:00 p.m. EDT	Pirates	**W** 6–1	**Norman** (1–0)	Rooker (8–9)	**Eastwick** (1)	2:51	54,752	CIN 2–0	W2
3	October 7	8:32 p.m. EDT	@ Pirates	**W** 5–3 (10)	**Eastwick** (1–0)	Hernández (0–1)	**Borbón** (1)	2:47	46,355	CIN 3–0	W3

World Series vs. Boston Red Sox 4–3 (Home: 2–1; Away: 2–2)

#	Date	Time (ET)	Opponent	Score	Win	Loss	Save	Time of Game	Attendance	Series	Box/ Streak
1	October 11	1:00 p.m. EDT	@ Red Sox	L 0–6	Tiant (1–0)	**Gullett** (0–1)	—	2:27	35,205	BOS 1–0	L1
2	October 12	1:00 p.m. EDT	@ Red Sox	**W** 3–2	**Eastwick** (1–0)	Drago (0–1)	—	2:38	35,205	TIE 1–1	W1
3	October 14	8:30 p.m. EDT	Red Sox	**W** 6–5 (10)	**Eastwick** (2–0)	Willoughby (0–1)	—	3:03	55,392	CIN 2–1	W2
4	October 15	8:30 p.m. EDT	Red Sox	L 4–5	Tiant (2–0)	**Norman** (0–1)	—	2:52	55,667	TIE 2–2	L1
5	October 16	8:30 p.m. EDT	Red Sox	**W** 6–2	**Gullett** (1–1)	Cleveland (0–1)	**Eastwick** (1)	2:23	56,393	CIN 3–2	W1
—	October 18	1:00 p.m. EDT	@ Red Sox	Postponed (rain); Makeup: October 21							
—	October 19	1:00 p.m. EDT	@ Red Sox	Postponed (rain); Makeup: October 21							
—	October 20	8:15 p.m. EDT	@ Red Sox	Postponed (rain); Makeup: October 21							
6	October 21	8:15 p.m. EDT	@ Red Sox	L 6–7 (12)	Wise (1–0)	**Darcy** (0–1)	—	4:01	35,205	TIE 3–3	L1
7	October 22	8:15 p.m. EDT	@ Red Sox	**W** 4–3	**C. Carroll** (1–0)	Burton (0–1)	**McEnaney** (1)	2:52	35,205	CIN 4–3	W1

== Player stats ==
= Indicates team leader

= Indicates league leader

=== Batting ===
==== Starters by position ====
Note: Pos = Position; G = Games played; AB = At bats; H = Hits; Avg. = Batting average; HR = Home runs; RBI = Runs batted in

Pos	Player	G	AB	H	Avg.	HR	RBI
C	Johnny Bench	142	530	150	.283	28	110
1B	Tony Pérez	137	511	144	.282	20	109
2B	Joe Morgan	146	498	163	.327	17	94
3B	Pete Rose	162	662	210	.317	7	74
SS	Dave Concepción	140	507	139	.274	5	49
LF	George Foster	134	463	139	.300	23	78
CF	César Gerónimo	148	501	129	.257	6	53
RF	Ken Griffey	132	463	141	.305	4	46

==== Other batters ====
Note: G = Games played; AB = At bats; H = Hits; Avg. = Batting average; HR = Home runs; RBI = Runs batted in

Player	G	AB	H	Avg.	HR	RBI
Dan Driessen	88	210	59	.281	7	38
Merv Rettenmund	93	188	45	.239	2	19
Darrel Chaney	71	160	35	.219	2	26
Bill Plummer	65	159	29	.182	1	19
Doug Flynn	89	127	34	.268	1	20
Terry Crowley	66	71	19	.268	1	11
Ed Armbrister	59	65	12	.185	0	2
John Vukovich	31	38	8	.211	0	2
Don Werner	7	8	1	.125	0	0

=== Pitching ===
==== Starting pitchers ====
Note: G = Games pitched; IP = Innings pitched; W = Wins; L = Losses; ERA = Earned run average; SO = Strikeouts

Player	G	IP	W	L	ERA	SO
Gary Nolan	32	210.2	15	9	3.16	74
Jack Billingham	33	208.0	15	10	4.11	79
Fred Norman	34	188.0	12	4	3.73	119
Don Gullett	22	159.2	15	4	2.42	98
Pat Darcy	27	130.2	11	5	3.58	46
Clay Kirby	26	110.2	10	6	4.72	48

==== Other pitchers ====
Note: G = Games pitched; IP = Innings pitched; W = Wins; L = Losses; ERA = Earned run average; SO = Strikeouts

Player	G	IP	W	L	ERA	SO
Tom Carroll	12	47.0	4	1	4.98	14

==== Relief pitchers ====
Note: G = Games pitched; W = Wins; L = Losses; SV = Saves; ERA = Earned run average; SO = Strikeouts

Player	G	W	L	SV	ERA	SO
Rawly Eastwick	58	5	3	22	2.60	61
Will McEnaney	70	5	2	15	2.47	48
Pedro Borbón	67	9	5	5	2.95	29
Clay Carroll	56	7	5	7	2.62	44
Tom Hall	2	0	0	0	0.00	3

== Postseason ==
=== National League Championship Series ===
==== Game One ====
October 4, Riverfront Stadium

Team	1	2	3	4	5	6	7	8	9	R	H	E
Pittsburgh	0	2	0	0	0	0	0	0	1	3	8	0
Cincinnati	0	1	3	0	4	0	0	0	X	8	11	0
W: Don Gullett (1–0) L: Jerry Reuss (0–1)
HRs: CIN – Don Gullett (1)

==== Game Two ====
October 5, Riverfront Stadium

Team	1	2	3	4	5	6	7	8	9	R	H	E
Pittsburgh	0	0	0	1	0	0	0	0	0	1	5	0
Cincinnati	2	0	0	2	0	1	1	0	X	6	12	1
W: Fred Norman (1–0) L: Jim Rooker (0–1) SV: Rawly Eastwick (1)
HRs: CIN – Tony Pérez (1)

==== Game Three ====
October 7, Three Rivers Stadium

Team	1	2	3	4	5	6	7	8	9	10	R	H	E
Cincinnati	0	1	0	0	0	0	0	2	0	2	5	6	0
Pittsburgh	0	0	0	0	0	2	0	0	1	0	3	7	2
W: Rawly Eastwick (1–0) L: Ramón Hernández (0–1) SV: Pedro Borbón (1)
HRs: CIN – Dave Concepción (1), Pete Rose (1); PIT – Al Oliver (1)

=== World Series ===
NL Cincinnati Reds (4) vs. AL Boston Red Sox (3)
Game	Score	Date	Location	Attendance	Time of Game
1	Reds – 0, Red Sox – 6	Sat. Oct 11 (D)	Fenway Park	35,205	2:27
2	Reds – 3, Red Sox – 2	Sun. Oct 12 (D)	Fenway Park	35,205	2:38
3	Red Sox – 5, Reds – 6 (10 inns)	Tue. Oct 14 (N)	Riverfront Stadium	55,392	3:03
4	Red Sox – 5, Reds – 4	Wed. Oct 15 (N)	Riverfront Stadium	55,667	2:52
5	Red Sox – 2, Reds – 6	Thu. Oct 16 (N)	Riverfront Stadium	56,393	2:23
6	Reds – 6, Red Sox – 7 (12 inns)	Tue. Oct 21 (N)	Fenway Park	35,205	4:01
7	Reds – 4, Red Sox – 3	Wed. Oct 22 (N)	Fenway Park	35,205	2:52

== Awards and honors ==
- Sparky Anderson, Associated Press NL Manager of the Year
- Johnny Bench, Lou Gehrig Award
- Gary Nolan, Hutch Award
- Pete Rose, World Series Most Valuable Player
- Joe Morgan, NL MVP

=== All-Stars ===
All-Star Game

- Johnny Bench, catcher, starter
- Dave Concepción, shortstop, starter
- Joe Morgan, second baseman, starter
- Pete Rose, right fielder, starter
- Tony Pérez, reserve

== Farm system ==
Level	Team	League	Manager
AAA	Indianapolis Indians	American Association	Vern Rapp
AA	Trois-Rivières Aigles	Eastern League	Jim Snyder and Ron Plaza
A	Tampa Tarpons	Florida State League	Russ Nixon
A-Short Season	Eugene Emeralds	Northwest League	Greg Riddoch
Rookie	Billings Mustangs	Pioneer League	Jim Hoff

LEAGUE CHAMPIONS: Eugene
