= 1975 Los Angeles Dodgers season =

1975 Los Angeles Dodgers
- League: National League
- Division: West
- Ballpark: Dodger Stadium
- City: Los Angeles
- Record: 88–74 (.543)
- Divisional place: 2nd
- Owners: Walter O'Malley, heirs of James Mulvey
- President: Peter O'Malley
- General managers: Al Campanis
- Managers: Walter Alston
- Television: KTTV (11)
- Radio: KABC; Vin Scully, Jerry Doggett; XEGM; Jaime Jarrín, Rudy Hoyos

The 1975 Los Angeles Dodgers season was the 86th season for the Los Angeles Dodgers franchise in Major League Baseball (MLB), their 18th season in Los Angeles, California, and their 14th season playing their home games at Dodger Stadium in Los Angeles California. The Dodgers finished in second place, 20 games behind the Cincinnati Reds in the National League West. This would be long time manager Walter Alston's final full season in charge. Alston would step down towards the end of the 1976 season and was replaced by his third base coach Tommy Lasorda.

== Offseason ==
- January 29, 1975: Von Joshua was selected off waivers from the Dodgers by the San Francisco Giants.

== Regular season ==
=== Season standings ===
NL West
Team	W	L	Pct.	GB	Home	Road
Cincinnati Reds	108	54	.667	—	64‍–‍17	44‍–‍37
Los Angeles Dodgers	88	74	.543	20	49‍–‍32	39‍–‍42
San Francisco Giants	80	81	.497	27½	46‍–‍35	34‍–‍46
San Diego Padres	71	91	.438	37	38‍–‍43	33‍–‍48
Atlanta Braves	67	94	.416	40½	37‍–‍43	30‍–‍51
Houston Astros	64	97	.398	43½	37‍–‍44	27‍–‍53

=== Record vs. opponents ===
1975 National League record Sources:
Team	ATL	CHC	CIN	HOU	LAD	MON	NYM	PHI	PIT	SD	SF	STL
Atlanta	—	5–7	3–15	12–6	8–10	8–4	4–8	5–7	4–8	7–11	8–9	3–9
Chicago	7–5	—	1–11	7–5	5–7	9–9	7–11	12–6	6–12	5–7	5–7	11–7
Cincinnati	15–3	11–1	—	13–5	8–10	8–4	8–4	7–5	6–6	11–7	13–5	8–4
Houston	6–12	5–7	5–13	—	6–12	8–4	4–8	6–6	6–5	9–9	5–13	4–8–1
Los Angeles	10–8	7–5	10–8	12–6	—	5–7	6–6	7–5	5–7	11–7	10–8	5–7
Montreal	4–8	9–9	4–8	4–8	7–5	—	10–8	7–11	7–11	7–5	5–7	11–7
New York	8–4	11–7	4–8	8–4	6–6	8–10	—	7–11	5–13	8–4	8–4	9–9
Philadelphia	7-5	6–12	5–7	6–6	5–7	11–7	11–7	—	11–7	7–5	7–5	10–8
Pittsburgh	8–4	12–6	6–6	5–6	7–5	11–7	13–5	7–11	—	8–4	5–7	10–8
San Diego	11–7	7–5	7–11	9–9	7–11	5–7	4–8	5–7	4–8	—	8–10	4–8
San Francisco	9–8	7–5	5–13	13–5	8–10	7–5	4–8	5–7	7–5	10–8	—	5–7
St. Louis	9–3	7–11	4–8	8–4–1	7–5	7–11	9–9	8–10	8–10	8–4	7–5	—

=== Opening day lineup ===
Opening Day starters
Name	Position
Davey Lopes	Second baseman
Bill Buckner	Left fielder
Jimmy Wynn	Center fielder
Joe Ferguson	Right fielder
Steve Garvey	First baseman
Ron Cey	Third baseman
Steve Yeager	Catcher
Bill Russell	Shortstop
Don Sutton	Starting pitcher

=== Notable transactions ===
- May 2, 1975: Geoff Zahn and Eddie Solomon were traded by the Dodgers to the Chicago Cubs for Burt Hooton.
- July 15, 1975: Jim Brewer was purchased from the Dodgers by the California Angels.

=== Roster ===
1975 Los Angeles Dodgers
Roster
Pitchers: 21 Jim Brewer; 44 Al Downing; 46 Burt Hooton; 49 Charlie Hough; 35 Dennis Lewallyn; 46 Juan Marichal; 28 Mike Marshall; 47 Andy Messersmith; 31 Doug Rau; 36 Rick Rhoden; 41 Dave Sells; 20 Don Sutton; 45 Stan Wall; 38 Geoff Zahn	Catchers: 13 Joe Ferguson; 12,71 Paul Powell; 7 Steve Yeager; Infielders: 1 Rick Auerbach; 10 Ron Cey; 14 Iván DeJesús; 6 Steve Garvey; 34 Lee Lacy; 15 Davey Lopes; 5 Ken McMullen; 18 Bill Russell	Outfielders: 22 Bill Buckner; 27 Willie Crawford; 37 Henry Cruz; 43 John Hale; 9 Leron Lee; 11 Manny Mota; 17 Tom Paciorek; 8 Jerry Royster; 38 Joe Simpson; 23 Jimmy Wynn; Other batters: 2 Orlando Alvarez; 16 Charlie Manuel	Manager: 24 Walter Alston; Coaches: 26 Red Adams; 54 Monty Basgall; 58 Mark Cresse; 19 Jim Gilliam; 52 Tommy Lasorda

== Game log ==
=== Regular season ===
Legend
	Dodgers win
	Dodgers loss
	Postponement
	Eliminated from playoff race
**Bold**	Dodgers team member

1975 regular season game log: 94–67–1 (Home: 45–36; Away: 49–31–1)
April: 15–8 (Home: 8–2; Away: 7–6)

#	Date	Time (PT)	Opponent	Score	Win	Loss	Save	Time of Game	Attendance	Record	Box Streak
1	April 7		@ Reds	L 1–2 (14)						0–1	L1
2	April 9		@ Reds	L 3–4						0–2	L2
3	April 10		@ Reds	L 6–7						0–3	L3
7	April 14		Reds	**W** 5–2						3–4	W2
8	April 15		Reds	**W** 3–1						4–4	W3
9	April 16		Reds	**W** 7–6						5–4	W4
10	April 17		Reds	**W** 5–4 (11)						6–4	W5

May: 15–12 (Home: 9–7; Away: 6–5)

#	Date	Time (PT)	Opponent	Score	Win	Loss	Save	Time of Game	Attendance	Record	Box Streak
30	May 9		@ Pirates	L 3–11						19–11	L1
31	May 10		@ Pirates	**W** 6–2						20–11	W1
32	May 11		@ Pirates	**W** 7–0						21–11	W2
36	May 16		Pirates	L 2–3						23–13	L2
37	May 17		Pirates	**W** 4–3 (10)						24–13	W1
38	May 18		Pirates	L 2–7						24–14	L1

June: 13–16 (Home: 6–5; Away: 7–11)

#	Date	Time (PT)	Opponent	Score	Win	Loss	Save	Time of Game	Attendance	Record	Box Streak
55	June 6		@ Phillies	**W** 3–2						33–22	W3
56	June 7		@ Phillies	L 0–4						33–23	L1
57	June 8		@ Phillies	L 2–4						33–24	L2
62	June 13		Phillies	L 1–5						34–28	L4
63	June 14		Phillies	**W** 4–3						35–28	W1
64	June 15		Phillies	L 3–4						35–29	L1

July: 12–16 (Home: 7–7; Away: 5–9)

#	Date	Time (PT)	Opponent	Score	Win	Loss	Save	Time of Game	Attendance	Record	Box Streak
86	July 8		@ Pirates	**W** 3–0						48–38	W3
87	July 9		@ Pirates	L 2–3						48–39	L1
88	July 10		@ Pirates	L 1–4						48–40	L2
—	July 15	5:30 p.m. PDT	46th All-Star Game	National League vs. American League (Milwaukee County Stadium, Milwaukee, Wisconsin)							
92	July 17		Pirates	L 2–5						49–43	L3
93	July 18		Pirates	**W** 4–3						50–43	W1
94	July 19		Pirates	L 3–5						50–44	L1
100 (1)	July 25		@ Reds	**W** 4–3						53–47	W2
101 (2)	July 25		@ Reds	L 3–6						53–48	L1
102	July 26		@ Reds	L 3–5						53–49	L1
103	July 27		@ Reds	**W** 5–3						54–49	W1

August: 17–12 (Home: 8–9; Away: 9–3)

#	Date	Time (PT)	Opponent	Score	Win	Loss	Save	Time of Game	Attendance	Record	Box Streak
108	August 1		Reds	**W** 5–3 (10)						56–52	W1
109	August 2		Reds	L 0–1						56–53	L1
110	August 3		Reds	L 1–3						56–54	L2
117	August 11		@ Phillies	**W** 7–1						62–55	W4
112	August 12		@ Phillies	**W** 7–6						62–56	W5
113	August 13		@ Phillies	**W** 5–4						62–57	W6
130	August 25		Phillies	L 2–4						68–62	L3
131	August 26		Phillies	**W** 8–1						68–63	W1
132	August 27		Phillies	**W** 10–0						69–63	W2

September: 16–10 (Home: 11–3; Away: 5–7)

#	Date	Time (PT)	Opponent	Score	Win	Loss	Save	Time of Game	Attendance	Record	Box Streak
139	September 3		@ Reds	L 2–13						73–66	L2
140	September 4		@ Reds	**W** 3–2						74–66	W1
146	September 10		Reds	**W** 3–2						78–68	W3
147	September 11		Reds	**W** 5–2						79–68	W4

=== Detailed records ===
**National League**
Opponent	Home	Away	Total	Pct.	Runs scored	Runs allowed
**NL East**
Philadelphia Phillies	3–3	4–2	7–5	.583	52	38
Pittsburgh Pirates	2–4	3–3	5–7	.417	39	46
	**5–7**	**7–5**	**12–12**	**.500**	**91**	**84**
**NL West**
Cincinnati Reds	7–2	3–6	10–8	.556	64	69
**Los Angeles Dodgers**	—	—	—	—	—	—
	**7–2**	**3–6**	**10–8**	**.556**	**64**	**69**

== Player stats ==
=== Batting ===
==== Starters by position ====
Note: Pos = Position; G = Games played; AB = At bats; H = Hits; Avg. = Batting average; HR = Home runs; RBI = Runs batted in

Pos	Player	G	AB	H	Avg.	HR	RBI
C	Steve Yeager	135	452	103	.228	12	54
1B	Steve Garvey	160	659	210	.319	18	95
2B	Davey Lopes	155	618	162	.262	8	41
SS	Bill Russell	84	252	52	.206	0	14
3B	Ron Cey	158	566	160	.283	25	101
LF	Bill Buckner	92	288	70	.243	6	31
CF	Jim Wynn	130	412	102	.248	18	58
RF	Willie Crawford	124	373	98	.263	9	46

==== Other batters ====
Note: G = Games played; AB = At bats; H = Hits; Avg. = Batting average; HR = Home runs; RBI = Runs batted in

Player	G	AB	H	Avg.	HR	RBI
Lee Lacy	101	306	96	.314	7	40
John Hale	71	204	43	.211	6	22
Joe Ferguson	66	202	42	.208	5	23
Rick Auerbach	85	170	38	.224	0	12
Tom Paciorek	62	145	28	.193	1	5
Henry Cruz	53	94	25	.266	0	5
Iván DeJesús	63	87	16	.184	0	2
Manny Mota	52	49	13	.265	0	10
Ken McMullen	39	46	11	.239	2	14
Leron Lee	48	43	11	.256	0	2
Jerry Royster	13	36	9	.250	0	1
Charlie Manuel	15	15	2	.133	0	2
Paul Powell	8	10	2	.200	0	0
Joe Simpson	9	6	2	.333	0	0
Orlando Álvarez	4	4	0	.000	0	0

=== Pitching ===
= Indicates league leader

==== Starting pitchers ====
Note: G = Games pitched; IP = Innings pitched; W = Wins; L = Losses; ERA = Earned run average; SO = Strikeouts

Player	G	IP	W	L	ERA	SO
Andy Messersmith	42	321.2	19	14	2.29	213
Doug Rau	38	257.2	15	9	3.11	151
Don Sutton	35	254.1	16	13	2.87	175
Burt Hooton	31	223.2	18	7	2.82	148
Juan Marichal	2	6.0	0	1	13.50	1

==== Other pitchers ====
Note: G = Games pitched; IP = Innings pitched; W = Wins; L = Losses; ERA = Earned run average; SO = Strikeouts

Player	G	IP	W	L	ERA	SO
Rick Rhoden	26	99.1	3	3	3.08	40
Al Downing	22	74.2	2	1	2.89	39

==== Relief pitchers ====
Note: G = Games pitched; W = Wins; L = Losses; SV = Saves; ERA = Earned run average; SO = Strikeouts

Player	G	W	L	SV	ERA	SO
Mike Marshall	58	9	14	13	3.29	64
Charlie Hough	38	3	7	4	2.95	34
Jim Brewer	21	3	1	2	5.18	21
Stan Wall	10	0	1	0	1.69	6
Dave Sells	5	0	2	0	3.86	1
Geoff Zahn	2	0	1	0	9.00	1
Dennis Lewallyn	2	0	0	0	0.00	0

== Awards and honors ==
- Gold Glove Award
  - Steve Garvey
  - Andy Messersmith
- NL Pitcher of the Month
  - Don Sutton (April 1975)
  - Don Sutton (May 1975)
  - Burt Hooton (August 1975)
  - Burt Hooton (September 1975)
- NL Player of the Week
  - Burt Hooton and Don Sutton (Aug. 4–10)
  - Andy Messersmith (Sep. 8–14)

=== All-Stars ===
- 1975 Major League Baseball All-Star Game
  - Steve Garvey starter
  - Ron Cey starter
  - Jimmy Wynn starter
  - Mike Marshall reserve
  - Don Sutton reserve
  - Andy Messersmith reserve
- TSN National League All-Star
  - Steve Garvey

== Farm system ==
Level	Team	League	Manager
AAA	Albuquerque Dukes	Pacific Coast League	Stan Wasiak
AA	Waterbury Dodgers	Eastern League	Don LeJohn
A	Bakersfield Dodgers	California League	Ron Brand
A	Danville Dodgers	Midwest League	Bart Shirley
Rookie	Bellingham Dodgers	Northwest League	Bill Berrier

== 1975 Major League Baseball draft ==
The Dodgers drafted 33 players in the June draft and 11 in the January draft. Of those, six players would eventually play in the Major Leagues.

The top draft pick was shortstop Mark Bradley from Elizabethtown High School in Elizabethtown, Kentucky. He spent two seasons with the Dodgers as an outfielder in 1981–82 and a third season with the New York Mets and hit .204 in 113 at-bats.

The most successful draft pick was pitcher Dave Stewart, a 16th round pick out of St. Elizabeth High School in Oakland, California. He reached the Majors in 1978 with the Dodgers and played through 1995, primarily with the Oakland Athletics. He was 168–129 with a 3.95 ERA, was a 1989 All-Star, 3 time World Series Champion, a World Series MVP and 3 time League Championship Series MVP. Following his playing career he became a coach, an agent and a General Manager.

1975 draft picks

=== January draft ===
Round	Name	Position	School	Signed	Career span	Highest level
1	Donald Washington	OF	Laney College	Yes	1975–1977	A
2	Dale Emmer	OF	Santa Monica College	No		
3	Gavin Long	P	College of San Mateo	No; Braves-1977	1977	Rookie
4	Patrick Buckner	C	Sacramento City College	No	1977	A-
5	Steven Watson	P	Midland College	No		
6	Mike Tennant	RHP	Crowder College	Yes	1975–1981	AAA
7	Ronald Weirum	2B	Santa Barbara City College	Yes	1975–1977	A
8	Terry Watkins	P	Sacramento City College	No; Blue Jays-1978	1978	A-

==== January secondary phase ====
Round	Name	Position	School	Signed	Career span	Highest level
1	Gil Patterson	OF	Miami Dade College	No; Yankees-1975	1975–1982	MLB
2	William Yarbrough	IF	State College of Florida, Manatee–Sarasota	No; Royals-1977	1977–1979	AA
3	Earl Bass	RHP	University of South Carolina	No; Cardinals-1975	1975–1978	AAA

=== June draft ===
Round	Name	Position	School	Signed	Career span	Highest level
1	Mark Bradley	SS	Elizabethtown High School	Yes	1975–1984	MLB
2	Myron White	OF	Sana Ana Valley High School	Yes	1975–1981	MLB
3	Rod Scheller	RHP	Greeley West High School	Yes	1975–1979	A
4	James Evans	LHP	East Technical High School	Yes	1975–1977	A
5	Marvin Garrison	OF	Verbum Dei High School	Yes	1975–1980	AAA
6	Robert Adams	SS	Fairview High School	Yes	1975–1976	A
7	Kenneth Townsend	RHP	Sonora High School	Yes	1975–1978	A
8	Jacky Parish	C	University of Oklahoma	Yes	1975–1976	A
9	Arthur Toal	SS	Tottenville High School	No; Tigers-1978	1978–1980	AA
10	Charles Martin	OF	Wheaton North High School	Yes	1975	A-
11	Michael Lake	LHP	Hueneme High School	Yes	1975–1978	A
12	Robert Healey	RHP	Roosevelt High School	No; Angels-1977	1977–1979	A
13	Robert Lowman	RHP	Mamaroneck High School	Yes	1975	A-
14	Samuel Roberts	1B	Carson-Newman College	No		
15	Bob Stoffie	RHP	John F. Kennedy High School	Yes	1975–1977	A
16	Dave Stewart	RHP	St. Elizabeth High School	Yes	1975–1995	MLB
17	Brad Gulden	C	Chaska High School	Yes	1975–1986	MLB
18	Mike Walters	RHP	Alta Loma High School	No; Angels-1977	1977–1985	MLB
19	Robert Dove	RHP	Tustin High School	No		
20	William Seney	RHP	Apple Valley High School	No		
21	Stephen Youngman	1B	North Brunswick High School	No		
22	Paul Jacobs	OF	John F. Kennedy High School	No		
23	Paul Touchstone	RHP	Galveston College	No		
24	Robert Newman	RHP	Mt. Hood Community College	No		
25	Kris Kaminska	RHP	Peoria High School	No		
26	Jay Nelson	RHP	Chaska High School	No		
27	Mitch Dean	RHP	Concord High School	No		
28	Arthur Fischetti	2B	Lafayette College	Yes	1975–1977	AA
29	Michael Otto	RHP	John F. Kennedy High School	No	1980	A-
30	Paul Lanier	C	Moultrie High School	No		
31	Rudy Rufer	SS	Valley Stream High School	No		
32	James Black	OF	Camden High School	No		
33	Alan Clark	RHP	Hiawatha High School	No		
