= Ken Griffey =

Ken Griffey may refer to two baseball players:

- Ken Griffey Sr., who played from 1973 to 1991 for the Cincinnati Reds, New York Yankees, Atlanta Braves, and Seattle Mariners
- Ken Griffey Jr., who played from 1989 to 2010 for the Seattle Mariners, Cincinnati Reds, and Chicago White Sox
