= Terry Crowley =

American baseball player (born 1947)

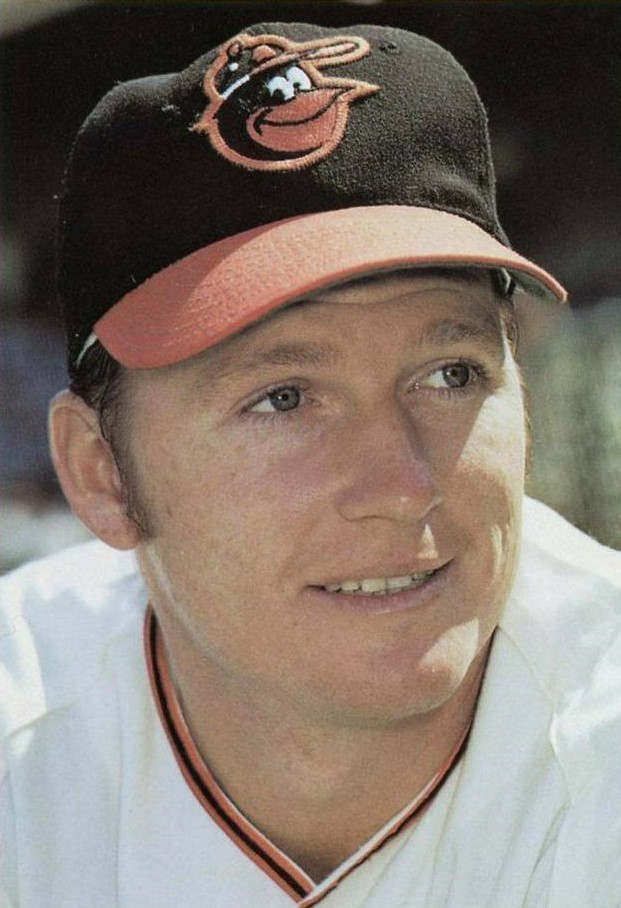
- Outfielder / Designated hitter
- Born: February 16, 1947 (age 79); Staten Island, New York, U.S.
- Batted: Left Threw: Left

MLB debut
- September 4, 1969, for the Baltimore Orioles

Last MLB appearance
- October 2, 1983, for the Montreal Expos

MLB statistics
- Batting average: .250
- Home runs: 42
- Runs batted in: 229
- Stats at Baseball Reference

Teams
- As player: Baltimore Orioles (1969–1973); Cincinnati Reds (1974–1975); Atlanta Braves (1976); Baltimore Orioles (1976–1982); Montreal Expos (1983); As coach: Baltimore Orioles (1985–1988); Minnesota Twins (1991–1998); Baltimore Orioles (1999–2011)

Career highlights and awards
- 3× World Series champion (1970, 1975, 1991); Baltimore Orioles Hall of Fame

Terrence Michael Crowley (born February 16, 1947) is an American former professional baseball player and coach. He played in Major League Baseball as an outfielder, first baseman and pinch hitter from 1969 through 1983, most notably as a member of the Baltimore Orioles dynasty that won three consecutive American League pennants from 1969 to 1971 and, won the World Series in 1970. He serves as an organizational hitting instructor for the Baltimore Orioles. Crowley has been inducted into the Staten Island Sports Hall of Fame.

== Playing career ==
Crowley played for the Orioles from 1969 to 1973 and from 1976 to 1982. He was a backup player who could play the outfield and first base. When the designated hitter rule was implemented, he was the first Oriole to fulfill this role. However, he was best known during his playing career for being a pinch hitter. As of the end of the 2011 season, Crowley's 108 career pinch-hits is still the 13th-most all-time, tying him with Denny Walling. Teammate Jim Palmer called him "a really great pinch hitter who studies pitchers to get himself psyched to hit."

Crowley's contract was sold by the Orioles to the Texas Rangers at the Winter Meetings on December 6, 1973. He never appeared in a regular-season contest with the Rangers, as he was claimed off waivers by the Cincinnati Reds during spring training on March 19, 1974. He was traded from the Reds to the Atlanta Braves for Mike Thompson on April 7, 1976.

In 865 games over 15 seasons, Crowley compiled a .250 batting average (379-for-1,518) with 174 runs, 62 doubles, 1 triple, 42 home runs, 229 RBI, 222 base on balls, 181 strikeouts, .345 on-base percentage and .375 slugging percentage. He posted a .987 fielding percentage. In 13 post-season games, all in a pinch-hitting role (3 WS, 2 ALCS, 1 NLCS), he hit .273 (3-for-11) with 3 RBI.

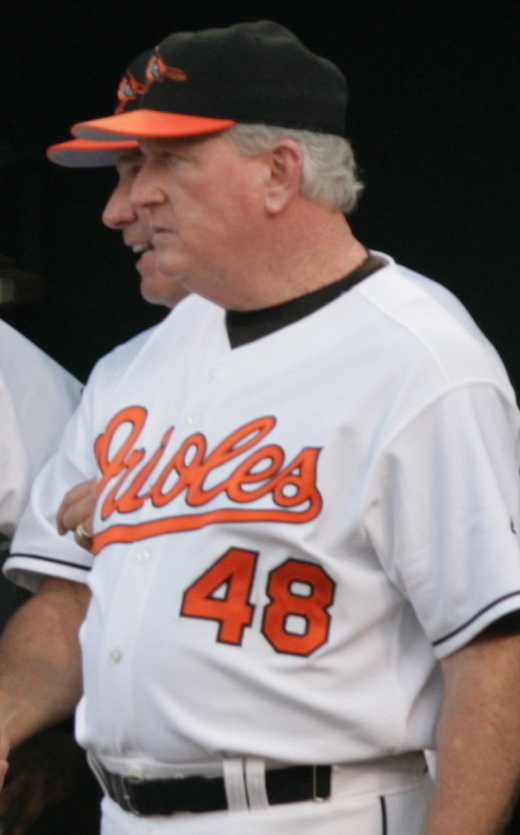
Crowley coaching with the Baltimore Orioles in 2006

== Coaching career ==
Crowley has served as the hitting coach for the Baltimore Orioles from 1985 through 1988, the Minnesota Twins from 1991 through 1998, and the Orioles again from 1999 through 2010. Crowley served as a roving hitting instructor in the Orioles organization in 2011. He was an interim bullpen coach in 2011, following Mark Connor's resignation and the subsequent promotion of bullpen coach Rick Adair. In 2014, Crowley worked with Oriole Chris Davis on his hitting.

== Personal life ==
Crowley graduated from Curtis High School. He attended Long Island University, Brooklyn Campus, before being drafted by the Orioles in 1966.

== Sources ==
- Career statistics from Baseball Reference · Baseball Reference (Minors) · Retrosheet · Baseball Almanac

Preceded by Ralph Rowe	Baltimore Orioles hitting coach 1985–1988	Succeeded by Tommy McCraw
Preceded by Tony Oliva	Minnesota Twins hitting coach 1991–1998	Succeeded by Scott Ullger
Preceded by Rick Down	Baltimore Orioles hitting coach 1999–2010	Succeeded by Jim Presley
