= Henry Cruz =

American baseball player (born 1952)

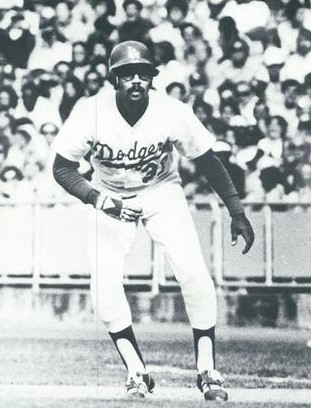
- Outfielder
- Born: February 27, 1952 (age 74); Christiansted, United States Virgin Islands
- Batted: Left Threw: Left

MLB debut
- April 18, 1975, for the Los Angeles Dodgers

Last MLB appearance
- July 30, 1978, for the Chicago White Sox

MLB statistics
- Batting average: .229
- Home runs: 8
- Runs batted in: 34
- Stats at Baseball Reference

Teams
- Los Angeles Dodgers (1975–1976); Chicago White Sox (1977–1978)

Henry (Acosta) Cruz (born February 27, 1952) is a former professional baseball outfielder who currently works as the director of the Los Angeles Dodgers Dominican baseball academy.

== Career ==
Cruz was signed as an undrafted free agent by the Los Angeles Dodgers on January 1, 1971. He made his major league debut, as a pinch hitter, on April 18, 1975, against the San Francisco Giants. He recorded his first hit on April 20 against the Giants.

Cruz played parts of the 1975 and 1976 seasons with the Dodgers. He was claimed off waivers by the Chicago White Sox near the end of the 1977 season while hitting .353 for the AAA Albuquerque Dukes.

Cruz was signed off waivers by the Chicago White Sox in September 1977. He played 16 games for the Sox in 77 and another 53 games in 1978. He remained in the Sox minor league system through 1980, when he was picked up off waivers by the Detroit Tigers.

Cruz retired after playing for the Evansville Triplets in 1981. However, he then went on to play in the Mexican League for the following 4 years: 1982 played for Reynosa Broncos; 1983 played for Leon, Guanahuato; and 1984–85 played for the Saltillo Seraperos. He ended his playing career after the 1985 season.

He was also one of the most consistent hitters for the Arecibo Wolves in the Puerto Rico Winter Baseball League during this period.

Cruz spent 10 seasons as a scout for the Cleveland Indians following his playing days. In 2007, the Dodgers hired him to be the hitting instructor for Class-A Ogden Raptors. He was moved to the Inland Empire 66ers in 2008.
