= Mark Bradley (baseball) =

American baseball player (1956–2024)

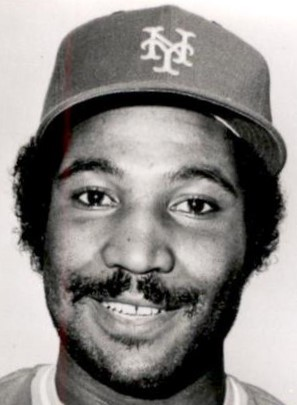
- Bradley in 1983
- Outfielder
- Born: December 3, 1956; Elizabethtown, Kentucky, U.S.
- Died: December 30, 2024 (aged 68); Louisville, Kentucky, U.S.
- Batted: Right Threw: Right

MLB debut
- September 3, 1981, for the Los Angeles Dodgers

Last MLB appearance
- October 2, 1983, for the New York Mets

MLB statistics
- Batting average: .204
- Home runs: 3
- Runs batted in: 5
- Stats at Baseball Reference

Teams
- Los Angeles Dodgers (1981–1982); New York Mets (1983)

Mark Allen Bradley (December 3, 1956 – December 30, 2024) was an American professional baseball outfielder. He played in Major League Baseball (MLB) for the Los Angeles Dodgers and New York Mets from 1981 to 1983.

== Biography ==
The Elizabethtown High School graduate was originally an infielder when he was drafted by the Los Angeles Dodgers in the first round of the 1975 Major League Baseball draft. He batted .283 with seventy home runs and 442 runs batted in over seven seasons in the Dodgers' farm system when he received a September call up in 1981. His only hit in six at bats was a double off the Houston Astros' Billy Smith.

Back in triple A for 1982, he batted .317 with twelve home runs and 101 RBIs for the Pacific Coast League's Albuquerque Dukes. Receiving a second September call up that year, he was 1-for-3 with a run scored.

In Spring training 1983, Bradley was hitting .353 when he was traded to the injury riddled New York Mets for two minor league pitchers.

He was 0-for his first-8 at bats as a Met before getting his first hit on May 10. He went 3-for-5 with a double, a stolen base and a run in a 5–4 extra innings loss to the Astros.

He hit his first major league home run as a pinch hitter on June 2 off Fernando Valenzuela to send that game to extra innings. The Mets lost in fourteen innings, giving them a record of 16–30, and prompting manager George Bamberger to resign after the game. "I've probably suffered enough." He saw more limited playing time under new manager Frank Howard. In his only full season in the majors, Bradley batted .202 with three home runs and five RBIs.

On February 22, 1984, he was released by the Mets. He batted .242 with one home run and sixteen RBIs for the California League's San Jose Bees that season before retiring.

On December 30, 2024, Bradley was found dead at his residence in Louisville, Kentucky; he had previously been undergoing treatment for colorectal cancer.
