= Tom Carroll (pitcher) =

American baseball player (born 1952)

- Pitcher
- Born: November 5, 1952 (age 73); Oriskany, New York, U.S.
- Batted: Left Threw: Right

MLB debut
- July 7, 1974, for the Cincinnati Reds

Last MLB appearance
- September 13, 1975, for the Cincinnati Reds

MLB statistics
- Win–loss record: 8–4
- Earned run average: 4.16
- Strikeouts: 51
- Stats at Baseball Reference

Teams
- Cincinnati Reds (1974–1975)

Thomas Michael Carroll (born November 5, 1952) is an American former Major League Baseball pitcher for the Cincinnati Reds.

The Reds selected Carroll in the sixth round of the June 1970 Major League Baseball draft out of North Allegheny High School in Pittsburgh, Pennsylvania at age 17. At 18, Carroll went 18–5 with a 2.39 earned run average and 148 strikeouts with the Florida State League's Tampa Tarpons. At 20, in 1973, Carroll went 15-9 for the AAA Indianapolis Indians in the American Association.

Carroll tossed a no-hitter against Omaha for Indianapolis in 1974 to improve his season record to 8-4 and his career minor league record to 51–33 when he received his first call to the majors. He made his major league debut on July 7, 1974 at Riverfront Stadium. Facing Bob Forsch (also making his major league debut) in the first game of a doubleheader with the St. Louis Cardinals, he held the Cardinals to just two hits over seven innings while striking out six.

The Reds went on to win in each of Carroll's first seven starts and at that point, he was 4–0 with 3 no decisions. He left the game after seven innings of his eighth start, giving up 3 hits and one run. The Reds eventually lost 2–1. He lost his final three decisions of the year, and ended the season 4–3 with a 3.68 ERA.

He began the 1975 season with the AAA Indianapolis Indians, and was called to the majors when Reds starter Don Gullett fractured his left thumb. Immediately starting upon his arrival, he won his first two games, beating Houston 4-3 and then threw 8 shutout innings against Atlanta, giving up three hits. On August 2, Carroll pitched 6 1/3 scoreless innings against the Dodgers in front of 52,015 fans. Clay Carroll came in in relief and together they beat Andy Messersmith and Mike Marshall 1–0. It would be his last major league win.

He finished the season 4–1 with a 4.98 ERA in place of Gullett. Though he did not participate in the Big Red Machine's 1975 World Series victory over the Boston Red Sox, he was voted a three-quarter World Series share by his teammates.

He struggled with arm problems for the rest of his career and spent the 1976 season with Indianapolis, going 9–12 with a 5.38 ERA. Following the season, the Reds traded him to the Pittsburgh Pirates for Jim Sadowski. He was taken from the Pirates as the first selection in the 1976 Rule V draft by the Montreal Expos. Lacking velocity during Montreal’s 1977 spring training, he was optioned to AAA Denver. He left baseball in midsummer when his arm did not rebound and attempted a brief comeback in 1980 with an independent team before retiring for good.

Carroll earned bachelor’s and master's degrees from Georgetown University and retired in 2024 after 30 years in various technical and management roles from The MITRE Corporation.

From 2012 to 2024, he served as an adjunct professor in Georgetown University's School of Foreign Service where he taught courses on international security.

== Career stats ==
W	L	PCT	ERA	G	GS	CG	SHO	SV	IP	H	ER	R	HR	BB	K	WP	HBP	Fld%	BA
8	4	.667	4.16	28	20	0	0	0	125.1	120	58	72	12	70	51	6	2	.944	.100

As a hitter, one of his four career singles came on July 17, 1974, against Bob Gibson as Gibson stood with 2999 career strikeouts. The next batter, César Gerónimo, ended up being Gibson's 3000th career strikeout.
