= Big Red Machine =

Nickname for Cincinnati Reds baseball teams during the 1970s

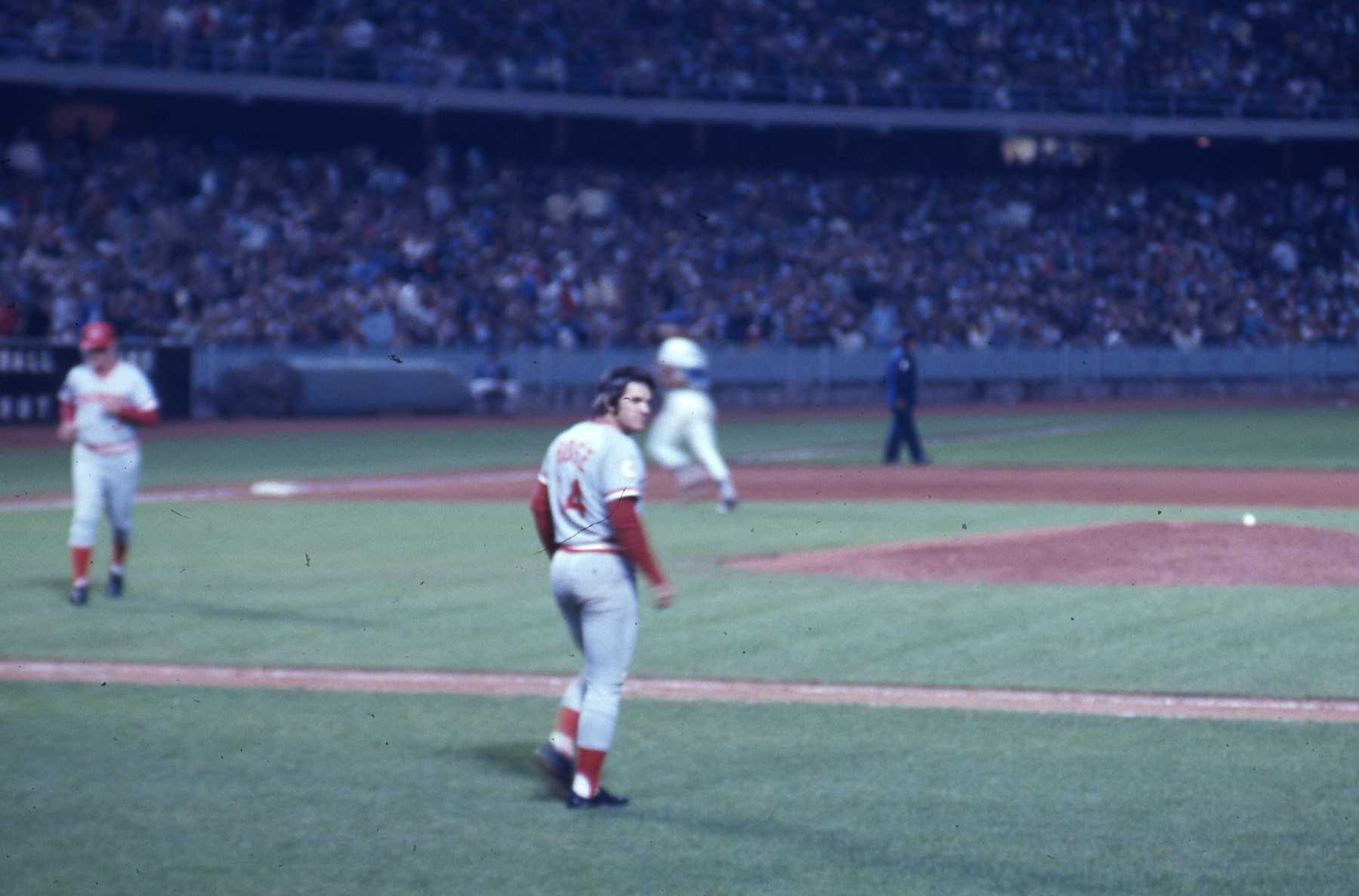
Pete Rose pictured during the Big Red Machine era

The Big Red Machine is a nickname for the Cincinnati Reds baseball team that dominated the National League from 1970 to 1979 and is widely recognized as being among the best in baseball history.

The team won six National League West Division titles, four National League pennants, and two World Series titles. Between 1970 and 1979, they averaged over 95 wins a season, with a total record of 953 wins and 657 losses.

The core of that Reds team had the best record in the Major Leagues in 1981, but did not make the postseason because of the split-season playoff format due to the 1981 players' strike.

== Origins ==
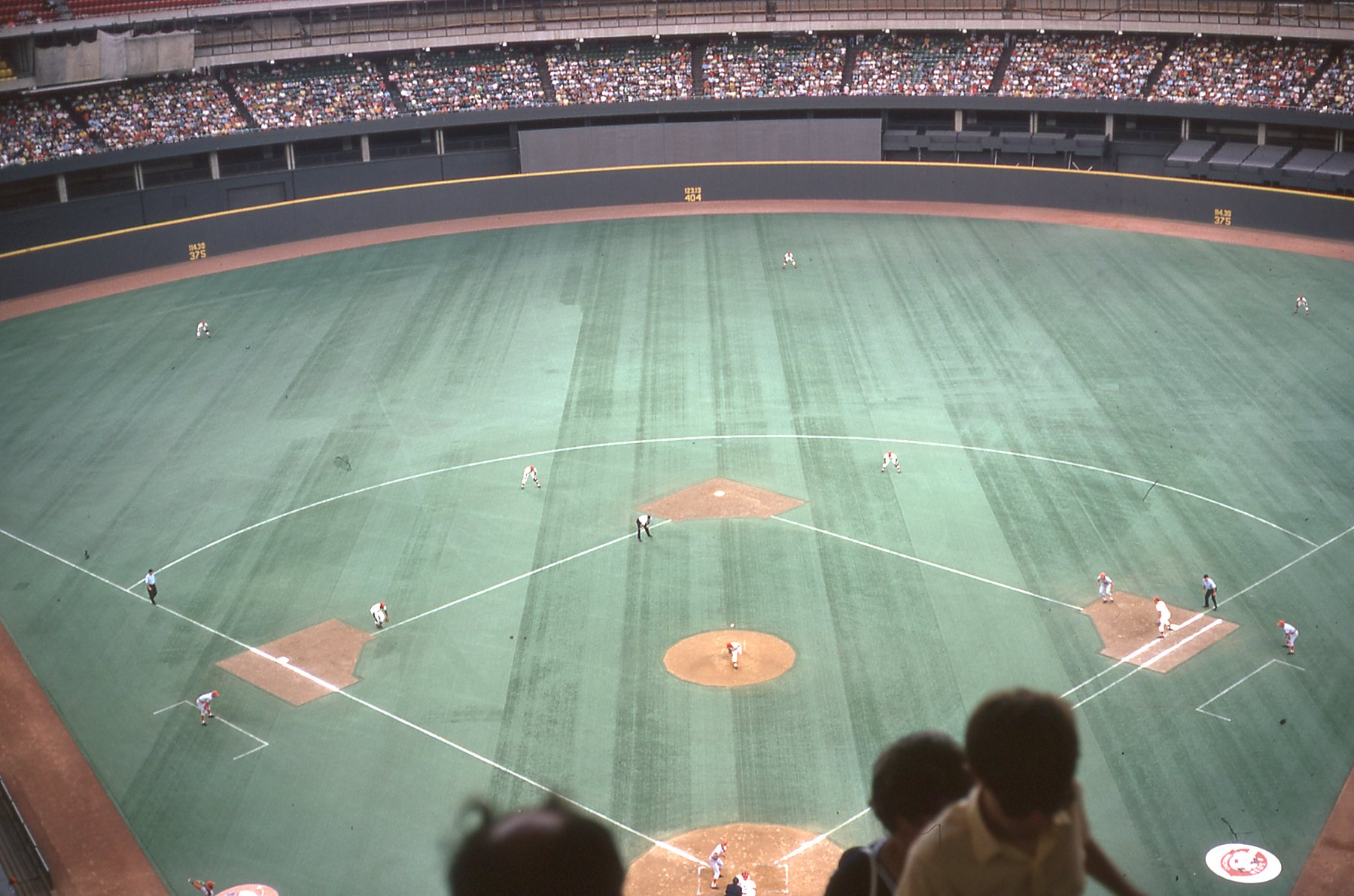
Riverfront Stadium, where the Reds played during the 1970s

The nickname is generally credited to sportswriter Bob Hertzel of The Cincinnati Enquirer, who used it in his coverage of the Reds during the 1969 season, but gained prominence in reference to the 1970 team, which won 70 of its first 100 games and posted a regular season record of 102–60 and won the National League pennant. Future Hall of Fame manager Sparky Anderson, whose major league managerial career began with the Reds' 1970 season, headed the Big Red Machine, which at its peak featured Pete Rose, Johnny Bench, Joe Morgan and Tony Pérez, and was supported by Dave Concepción, George Foster, César Gerónimo and Ken Griffey, Sr. The Cincinnati Reds of the 1970s garnered more World Series appearances than any other team during that decade, and compiled an overall record of 953 wins and 657 losses. They are the only National League team besides the 1907 and 1908 Chicago Cubs, the 1921 and 1922 New York Giants, and the 2024 and 2025 Los Angeles Dodgers to win back-to-back World Championships. The 2010–2014 San Francisco Giants won three World Series championships in five years but did not reach the postseason in consecutive years during this span.

== The "Great Eight" ==
The eight players most frequently referenced as members of the Big Red Machine include baseball's all-time hit leader in Rose; three Hall of Fame players in Bench, Pérez and Morgan, six National League MVP selections, four National League home run season leaders, and three NL Batting Champions. Between them, these eight players collectively won 25 Gold Glove awards and made 63 All-Star Game appearances. The starting lineup of Rose, Morgan, Pérez, Bench, Concepción, Foster, Griffey, and Gerónimo (collectively referred to as the "Great Eight") played 88 games together during the 1975 and 1976 seasons, losing only 19.

== Later years ==
Although some of the original players departed the team prior to the 1977 season, the Big Red Machine nickname is still often applied to the next two seasons of Reds teams until the departures of Anderson and Rose following the 1978 season. After Pérez was traded to the Montreal Expos and replaced by Dan Driessen at first base, the Reds would turn around to finish both the 1977 and 1978 seasons in second place. Ray Knight took over third base after Rose left Cincinnati in 1979, and the Reds would go on to win another division title that season, with their starting contingent still featuring six of the original eight members of the "Great Eight" lineup in Bench, Morgan, Foster, Concepción, Griffey and Gerónimo. They would go on to lose the National League Championship Series (NLCS) to the eventual World Series-winning Pittsburgh Pirates three games to none.

The Big Red Machine had one last great run in 1981 when they finished the strike-shortened season with the best record in baseball. Only three of the Great Eight remained in the starting lineup: Foster, Griffey, and Concepción. Bench had an injury plagued season and was moved from catcher to third base. Tom Seaver had a win–loss record of 14–2 and an ERA of 2.54 while starting only 23 games in the Reds' strike-shortened 108-game regular season. Despite that, the Reds finished second in the National League West in both halves of the season, making them ineligible to compete in the postseason despite having the best overall record in baseball.

== Rivalries ==
The Big Red Machine's archrivals were the Los Angeles Dodgers. The two teams often competed for the NL West division title and finished either first or second in every year from 1970 through 1979 with the one exception being 1971. Reds manager Sparky Anderson once said, "I don't think there's a rivalry like ours in either league. The Giants are supposed to be the Dodgers' natural rivals, but I don't think the feeling is there anymore. It's not there the way it is with us and the Dodgers." The rivalry ended when division realignment moved the Reds to the NL Central. They met again in the 1995 NLDS, with the Reds sweeping the Dodgers in three games.

The Big Red Machine was also part of the rivalry with the two Pennsylvania teams. All of the Reds' four pennants in the 1970s came against these teams (Pittsburgh Pirates in 1970, 1972, and 1975, and Philadelphia Phillies in 1976). In 1979, Pete Rose added to the notion of the Big Red Machine being part of the rivalry when he signed with the Phillies and helped them win their first World Series championship in 1980.

== Statistics ==
Cincinnati Reds season results, 1970–1979
| Season | Record | Divisional finish | Playoffs |
|---|---|---|---|
| 1970 | 102–60 | 1st (West) | Won NLCS vs. Pittsburgh Pirates, 3–0; Lost World Series to Baltimore Orioles, 4–1 |
| 1971 | 79–83 | 4th (West) | |
| 1972 | 95–59 | 1st (West) | Won NLCS vs. Pittsburgh Pirates, 3–2; Lost World Series to Oakland Athletics, 4–3 |
| 1973 | 99–63 | 1st (West) | Lost NLCS vs. New York Mets, 3–2 |
| 1974 | 98–64 | 2nd (West) | |
| 1975 | 108–54 | 1st (West) | Won NLCS vs. Pittsburgh Pirates, 3–0; Won World Series vs. Boston Red Sox, 4–3 |
| 1976 | 102–60 | 1st (West) | Won NLCS vs. Philadelphia Phillies, 3–0; Won World Series vs. New York Yankees, 4–0 |
| 1977 | 88–74 | 2nd (West) | |
| 1978 | 92–69 | 2nd (West) | |
| 1979 | 90–71 | 1st (West) | Lost NLCS vs. Pittsburgh Pirates, 3–0 |

== Sons of the Big Red Machine ==
The clubhouse of the Big Red Machine was full of young kids who would go on to play in the Major Leagues. The most successful was Ken Griffey Sr.'s son Ken Griffey Jr., who went on to have a Hall of Fame career. Furthermore, Ed Sprague Sr.'s son Ed Sprague Jr., Charlie Leibrandt's son Brandon Leibrandt, Pedro Borbon's son Pedro Borbón Jr., Ed Crosby's son Bobby Crosby, Pete Rose's son Pete Rose Jr., Clyde Mashore's sons Damon Mashore and Justin Mashore, Hal McRae's son Brian McRae, Julian Javier's son Stan Javier, and Tony Perez's son Eduardo Perez as well as Bill Plummer's grandson Conner Menez, and Lee May's grandson Jacob May, all played in MLB. Additionally, Paul Blair's son Paul Blair III, Bobby Tolan's son Robbie Tolan, Lee May's son Lee May Jr., Tommy Helms' son Tommy Helms Jr., Rich Hinton's son Robert Hinton, Darrel Chaney's son Keith Chaney and grandson Chase Chaney, Andy Kosco's son Bryn Kosco, Ken Griffey Sr.'s son Craig Griffey, and Tony Perez's son Victor Perez, all played minor league baseball.
