= Darrel Chaney =

American baseball player (born 1948)

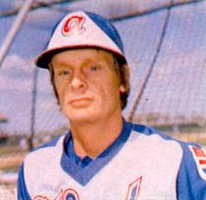
- Shortstop
- Born: March 9, 1948 (age 78); Hammond, Indiana, U.S.
- Batted: Both Threw: Right

MLB debut
- April 11, 1969, for the Cincinnati Reds

Last MLB appearance
- September 30, 1979, for the Atlanta Braves

MLB statistics
- Batting average: .217
- Home runs: 14
- Runs batted in: 190
- Stats at Baseball Reference

Teams
- Cincinnati Reds (1969–1975); Atlanta Braves (1976–1979)

Career highlights and awards
- World Series champion (1975)

Darrel Lee Chaney (born March 9, 1948) is an American former professional baseball player and television sports color commentator. He played in Major League Baseball as a shortstop from 1969 to 1979, most notably as a member of the Cincinnati Reds dynasty that won three National League pennants and a World Series championship between 1970 and 1975. He finished his playing career with the Atlanta Braves then served with the Braves as a television announcer along with Ernie Johnson, Skip Caray and Pete Van Wieren. He was on the Atlanta Braves Radio Network as well as WTBS-TV.

== Baseball career ==
Chaney was born in Hammond, Indiana and graduated of Oliver P. Morton High School, where he was a three-sport athlete and named 1st Team All-American Quarterback football player by Parade Magazine and was named the Northwest Indiana Times Athlete of the Year in 1966. His wife Cindy is also from Hammond and is a graduate of George Rogers Clark High School.

He had several football scholarship offers from Big Ten schools but signed with Ball State University because there he could play both football and baseball. However, he was selected by the Reds in the second round of the 1966 draft and signed for a $6,000 bonus.

Chaney served during the Vietnam War in the 478th Engineer Battalion of the U.S. Army based at Fort Thomas, Kentucky. His unit included several of his teammates including Johnny Bench, Pete Rose and Bobby Tolan.

Although a light-hitting infielder in the minor leagues, he broke through and led the Southern League with 23 home runs in 1968, earning him a spot on the Reds' roster in 1969, when he shared the shortstop position with Woody Woodward and Chico Ruiz. Chaney continued with the Reds in the 1970s but after the emergence of Dave Concepción was primarily a reserve.

He played in three World Series for the Reds' "Big Red Machine" teams, in 1970 and 1972 and on the World Series-winning team of 1975.

Chaney's trade to Atlanta for Mike Lum on December 12, 1975 was a reunion with Dave Bristol, his first major-league manager with the Reds. In 1976 he batted .252 with one home run and 50 RBI as the Braves' regular shortstop. Over the next three seasons, however, he was relegated to utility player and was released at the end of the 1979 season.

In 915 career games, Chaney hit for a .217 batting average, with 14 home runs, 190 runs batted in, 237 runs scored, 458 hits, 75 doubles, 17 triples and 19 stolen bases.

In 1980, Chaney played professional softball with the Cincinnati Suds of the American Professional Slo-Pitch League (APSPL).

Chaney is a past Chairman of the Board of the Major League Alumni Marketing (MLAM) and a Founder of Prime Retail Services, a North American Retail Construction Company V He is a Christian and a motivational speaker; Dan Hettinger has written a biography of Chaney entitled Welcome to the Big Leagues . . . Every Man's Journey to Significance. He lives in Hoschton, Georgia with his wife Cindy.

Darrel's son, Keith, played 2 years in the Braves Minor League System. Keith's son, Chase, is currently a pitcher in the California Angels Organization.
