= Fred Norman (baseball) =

American baseball player (born 1942)

- Pitcher
- Born: August 20, 1942 (age 82); San Antonio, Texas, U.S.
- Batted: Switch Threw: Left

MLB debut
- September 21, 1962, for the Kansas City Athletics

Last MLB appearance
- September 25, 1980, for the Montreal Expos

MLB statistics
- Win–loss record: 104–103
- Earned run average: 3.64
- Strikeouts: 1,303
- Stats at Baseball Reference

Teams
- Kansas City Athletics (1962–1963); Chicago Cubs (1964–1967); Los Angeles Dodgers (1970); St. Louis Cardinals (1970–1971); San Diego Padres (1971–1973); Cincinnati Reds (1973–1979); Montreal Expos (1980)

Career highlights and awards
- 2× World Series champion (1975, 1976); Cincinnati Reds Hall of Fame

Fredie Hubert Norman (born August 20, 1942) is an American former professional baseball player. He played in Major League Baseball as a left-handed pitcher from 1962 through 1980, most notably as a member of the Cincinnati Reds dynasty that won four division titles, two National League pennants and two World Series championships between 1973 and 1977. He also played for the Kansas City Athletics, Chicago Cubs, Los Angeles Dodgers, St. Louis Cardinals, San Diego Padres and the Montreal Expos.

Norman was one of the Reds' most durable and reliable pitchers during the mid-1970s when the team became known as the Big Red Machine for their dominance of the National League. He posted double-digit victory totals in each of his seasons with the Reds and was the team leader in strikeouts in 1975. In 2018, Norman was inducted into the Cincinnati Reds Hall of Fame.

== Baseball career ==
Norman was born in San Antonio, Texas and his family moved to Miami, Florida shortly after his birth. The 5-foot, 8-inch Norman graduated from Miami Jackson High School and was signed to a professional contract as an amateur free agent by the Kansas City Athletics in 1961. Norman was a screwball pitcher.

He was called up to the majors at age 20 on September 4, 1962 and made his major league debut on September 21, 1962 for the Athletics in a 6–1 home loss to the Detroit Tigers. Entering the game in the top of the eighth inning in relief of Diego Seguí, he induced Norm Cash to fly out and pitched two complete innings, giving up one run.

However, he spent nearly all of the decade in the minors, pitching only 15 big-league games in parts of five seasons — in 1962 and 1963 for the Athletics and in 1964, 1966 and 1967 for the Chicago Cubs. In 1970, he pitched 30 games for the Los Angeles Dodgers and one for the St. Louis Cardinals, then split time in 1971 between the Cardinals and the San Diego Padres, to whom he was traded. At age 28 he finally saw significant playing time, pitching 20 games (starting 18) with a 3–12 record but a fine 3.32 earned run average, and he followed that in 1972 with a 9–11 record and 3.44 ERA in 42 games (28 starts).

His biggest break came in 1973. After starting the season for the Padres 1–7 with a 4.26 ERA, on June 12 he was traded to the defending National League champion Cincinnati Reds, for whom he then pitched seven seasons (mid-1973–1979), was a consistently effective starter and won two World Series rings. For the Reds during that time, he made 196 starts, including 38 complete games, a record of 85–64, and an ERA every season between 3.09 and 3.73. In three World Series games (two in 1975, one in 1976), he pitched 10.1 innings with a record of 0-1 and an ERA of 6.10.

For the 1980 season, he signed as a free agent with the Montreal Expos, for whom he was mainly a reliever (starting eight games in 48 appearances) with a 4–4 record and a 4.13 ERA. At age 38, it was his final big-league season.

In 2018, he was named to the Cincinnati Reds Hall of Fame.
