= Pat Darcy =

American baseball player (born 1950)

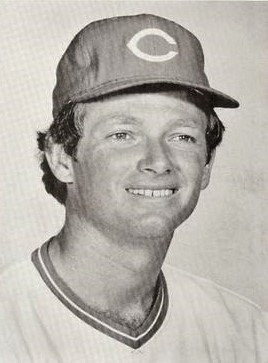
- Pitcher
- Born: May 12, 1950 (age 76); Troy, Ohio, U.S.
- Batted: Left Threw: Right

MLB debut
- September 12, 1974, for the Cincinnati Reds

Last MLB appearance
- June 13, 1976, for the Cincinnati Reds

MLB statistics
- Win–loss record: 14–8
- Earned run average: 4.15
- Strikeouts: 75
- Stats at Baseball Reference

Teams
- Cincinnati Reds (1974–1976)

Career highlights and awards
- World Series champion (1975)

Patrick Leonard Darcy (born May 12, 1950) is an American former professional baseball player. He played his entire career in Major League Baseball as a right-handed pitcher for the Cincinnati Reds from 1974 through 1976. Darcy was a member of the Reds team known as The Big Red Machine that won two consecutive World Series championships in 1975 and 1976.

Signed as an amateur free agent in 1969 by the Houston Astros, Darcy came to the Cincinnati Reds organization in 1974 when he was exchanged for Denis Menke.

Darcy is best known as the pitcher who gave up Carlton Fisk's walk-off home run in Game 6 of the 1975 World Series. The following season, after recording a 6.23 ERA in 11 appearances with the Reds, Darcy was demoted to the team's Indianapolis Indians farm club in June of that year. Darcy would never again pitch at the major league level.

Darcy was born near Dayton, Ohio. His family relocated to Tucson, Arizona, when he was a small child, and he considers Tucson his hometown; Darcy was a standout high school outfielder and pitcher for Rincon High School. Before becoming a professional pitcher, he attended and played for Mesa Community College. Darcy returned to Tucson after his major league career, earning his degree at the University of Arizona, starting his family, becoming active in the real estate industry and various aspects of local civic life. Darcy hosted local sports talk radio programs, ran for mayor of Tucson twice, and drew upon his connections and relationships in Major League Baseball to help bring the Colorado Rockies to Tucson in 1993 as a spring training team. Darcy was inducted into the Pima County (Arizona) Sports Hall of Fame in 1995 and is currently the president of the organization.
