= Ken Griffey Sr. =

American baseball player and manager (born 1950)

Ken Griffey
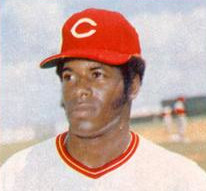
- Griffey with the Reds circa 1977
- Outfielder
- Born: April 10, 1950 (age 75); Donora, Pennsylvania, U.S.
- Batted: Left Threw: Left

MLB debut
- August 25, 1973, for the Cincinnati Reds

Last MLB appearance
- May 31, 1991, for the Seattle Mariners

MLB statistics
- Batting average: .296
- Hits: 2,143
- Home runs: 152
- Runs batted in: 859
- Stats at Baseball Reference

Teams
- Cincinnati Reds (1973–1981); New York Yankees (1982–1986); Atlanta Braves (1986–1988); Cincinnati Reds (1988–1990); Seattle Mariners (1990–1991)

Career highlights and awards
- 3× All-Star (1976, 1977, 1980); 2× World Series champion (1975, 1976); Cincinnati Reds Hall of Fame

George Kenneth Griffey Sr. (born April 10, 1950) is an American former professional baseball outfielder. He played in Major League Baseball (MLB) from 1973 through 1991, most notably as a member of the Cincinnati Reds team that won three division titles and two World Series championships between 1973 and 1976. He also played for the New York Yankees, Atlanta Braves, and Seattle Mariners.

A three-time All-Star, Griffey hit over .300 in five seasons for the powerful Cincinnati batting order that was known as the Big Red Machine for their dominance of the National League in the mid-1970s. In 2004, Griffey was inducted into the Cincinnati Reds Hall of Fame. He is the father of Hall of Fame outfielder Ken Griffey Jr.; the two were teammates on the Mariners for 51 games between 1990 and 1991.

== Early life ==
Griffey was born to Ruth Griffey (née Bailey) and Joseph "Buddy" Griffey—a high school teammate of another Hall of Fame outfielder, Stan Musial. Griffey's parents divorced when he was two and he and his siblings were raised by their mother. In a 2016 interview with ESPN, he said he did not see his father again until he was 16. His contemporaries in his hometown of Donora, Pennsylvania, did not think he would become a baseball star; they considered his best sport to be football, where he was a star wide receiver. Griffey himself considered football to be his best sport, followed by basketball, track, and only then baseball. At times, he even competed in track meets during baseball games, rushing up the hill between Donora High School's baseball field and track between at-bats when it came time for his track events.

However, as his high school graduation in 1969 neared, he discovered his girlfriend was pregnant. He was soon chosen by the Cincinnati Reds in the 29th round (682nd overall) of the 1969 Major League Baseball draft, signed with the organization, and married his girlfriend. After his first minor-league season, Ken Griffey Jr. was born. Though Griffey left Donora in 1972 as his professional career advanced, he retained close ties to the town.

== MLB career ==
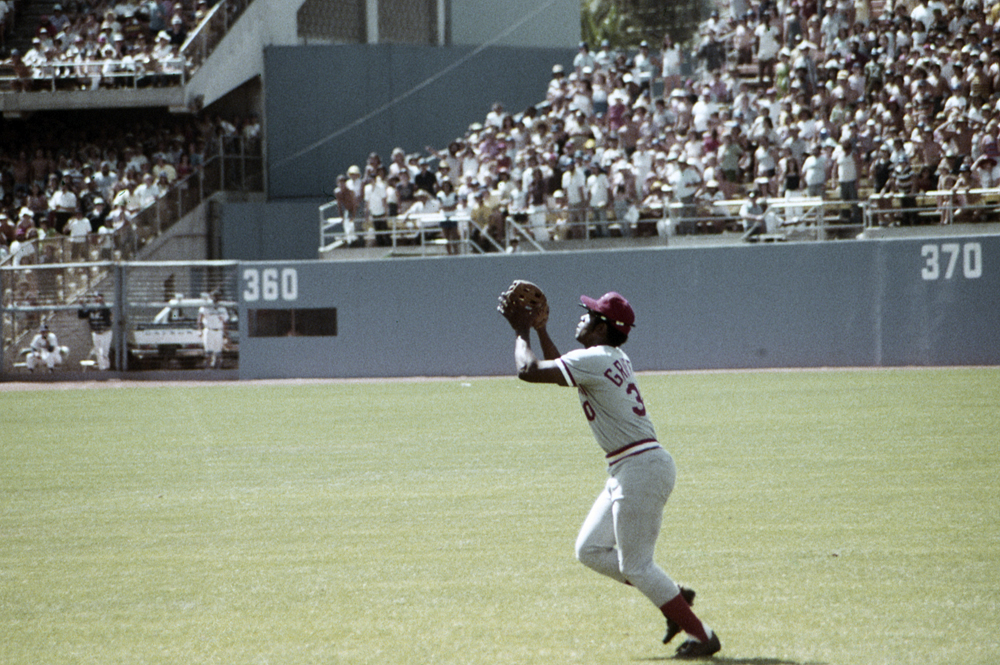
Griffey at Dodger Stadium, June 25, 1978

Griffey made his MLB debut with the Reds on August 25, 1973, finishing 2-for-4 in a 6–4 win over the St. Louis Cardinals. That season, Griffey played in only 25 games, but batted .384 with three home runs and 14 RBI. The following season, Griffey saw more playing time with 88 games, and hit .251 with two home runs and 19 RBI. In 1975, Griffey began to break out with a .305 batting average with four home runs and 46 RBI in 132 games. He batted .289 with 5 stolen bases in 10 postseason games as the Reds won the World Series.

Griffey's best season came in 1976, when he lost the batting title to Bill Madlock of the Chicago Cubs on the final day of the season. Griffey, leading Madlock .338 to .333, was initially pencilled into the starting lineup, but manager Sparky Anderson, after talking with Reds stars Pete Rose, Johnny Bench, Joe Morgan, and Tony Pérez, pulled Griffey. However, Madlock went 4-for-4, and news spread to the Reds. Griffey entered the game as a pinch hitter, batting 0-for-2 and falling behind Madlock. Griffey said after the game that he wanted to play but listened to Anderson. Griffey finished with a career-high .336 average, six home runs, and 74 RBI in 148 games. He also finished with a career-high 34 stolen bases. He finished eighth in NL Most Valuable Player voting, and was named to the Sporting News National League All-Star team. The Reds won their second consecutive World Series title in 1976, though Griffey batted 1-for-17 in the series. That year also marked the beginning of the end of their "Big Red Machine" phase. In the next four seasons, Griffey batted .318, .288, .316, and .294 with a total of 43 home runs. In Griffey's final season of his first stint with the Reds, the strike-shortened 1981 campaign, he batted .311 with only two home runs and 34 RBI in 101 games.

On November 4, 1981, the Reds traded Griffey to the New York Yankees for Fred Toliver and Brian Ryder. He played for the Yankees from 1982 to 1986 at first base and outfield. Injuries often plagued Griffey, who hit .306 with 11 homers and 46 RBI in 1983, his best season with the Yankees. Tommy John thought Griffey was a better player on Astroturf fields (like Riverfront Stadium) than natural grass fields (like Yankee Stadium). An incident during his tenure, where he was told to take his son, Ken Griffey Jr., off the field, while white teammate Graig Nettles' son was allowed to stay, resulted in Griffey Jr. later refusing to consider playing for the Yankees.

On June 30, 1986, Griffey was traded to the Atlanta Braves with Andre Robertson in exchange for Claudell Washington and Paul Zuvella. Griffey played only one full season with the Braves in 1987, batting .286 with 14 home runs and 64 RBI in 122 games. However, he struggled to begin the 1988 season, batting .249 with two home runs and 19 RBI in 69 games. On July 28, Griffey was released by the Braves.

Five days after his release from the Braves, Griffey signed a contract to return to the Reds on August 2. He batted .280 with two home runs and 4 RBI in 25 games with the Reds to finish the season. He spent the 1989 season with the Reds and was then released in the middle of the Reds' championship 1990 season. Griffey then signed with the Seattle Mariners to conclude the season, joining his son, Griffey Jr. They became the first father and son to be teammates in MLB. Although Griffey played in only 21 games to finish the season, he excelled, batting .377 with three home runs and 18 RBI. On December 17, 1990, he returned to the Mariners on a one-year deal for the 1991 season.

Griffey played in his final major league game on May 31, 1991, against the Texas Rangers. In November, Griffey chose to retire after 19 seasons due to a neck injury. In 1,997 games, Griffey compiled a lifetime batting average of .296, with 152 home runs and 859 RBI. Griffey was also the Most Valuable Player of the 1980 All-Star Game. In 2014, Griffey published his memoir Big Red: Baseball, Fatherhood, and My Life in the Big Red Machine, in which he discussed his childhood, formative years, professional career with both the Reds and the Yankees, and his relationships with friends and family.

== Post-playing career ==
Griffey was inducted into the Cincinnati Reds Hall of Fame in 2004. In 2010, Griffey was hired as the batting coach for the Dayton Dragons, the Reds' Single-A minor league affiliate. In 2011, he was named manager of the Bakersfield Blaze, the Reds' Single-A affiliate of the California League. In 2014, Griffey was replaced by Pat Kelly. Griffey remained in the organization as a roving instructor, focusing on hitting and bunting.

== The Griffey family ==
Ken's father, Joseph "Buddy" Griffey, was a local athlete who was a teammate of Stan Musial on the Donora High School baseball team.

The Griffeys (Ken Sr. and Ken Jr.) became the first father-and-son tandem to play on the same MLB team at the same time. They played their first game together for the Seattle Mariners on August 31, 1990, against the Kansas City Royals. On September 14, 1990, father and son hit back-to-back home runs in a game against the California Angels; this is the only time in major league history that this has happened. Griffey's younger son Craig played in the Mariners' minor league system and appeared with his brother in the outfield during some Cactus League games. Craig retired from baseball after failing to make it past Triple-A, where he appeared in a handful of games with the Tacoma Rainiers. Ken also has a younger daughter Jasmine Turner (37) living in Las Vegas. She was born out of wedlock in Atlanta, GA in 1988 when Griffey played for the Braves.

Griffey's grandson Trey Griffey went undrafted in the 2017 NFL draft and spent time with the Indianapolis Colts, Miami Dolphins, and Pittsburgh Steelers.

== See also ==
- List of second-generation Major League Baseball players
- List of Major League Baseball career hits leaders
- List of Major League Baseball career runs scored leaders
- List of Major League Baseball career stolen bases leaders
