= Tony Pérez =

Cuban baseball player and manager (born 1942)

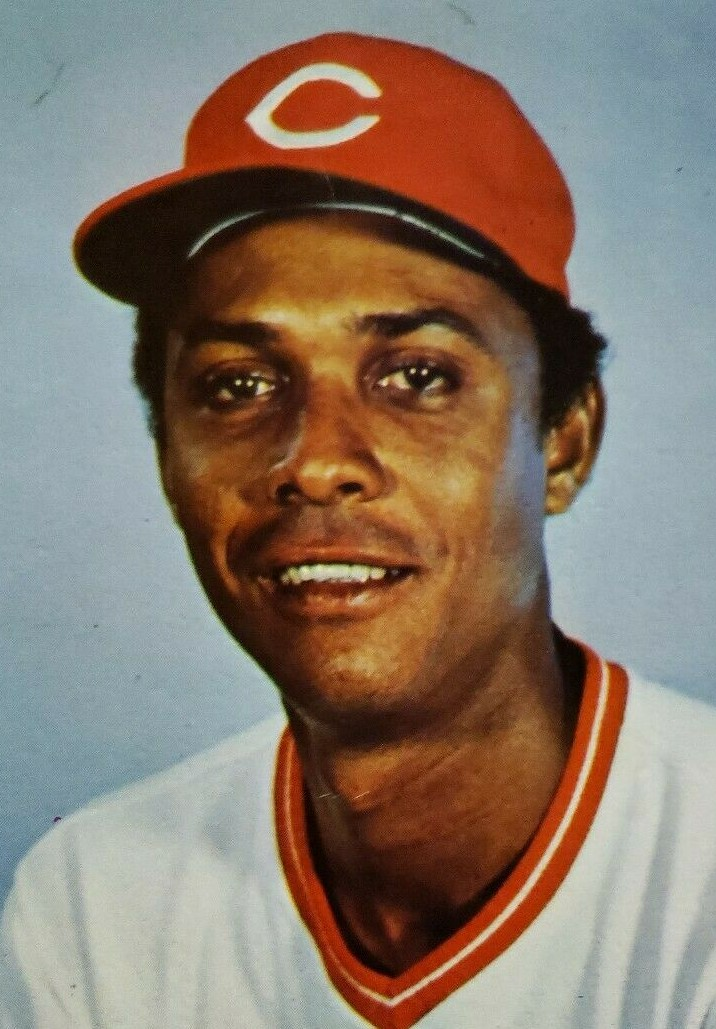
- Pérez with the Cincinnati Reds, c. 1976
- First baseman / Third baseman / Manager
- Born: May 14, 1942 (age 84); Ciego de Ávila, Cuba
- Batted: Right Threw: Right

MLB debut
- July 26, 1964, for the Cincinnati Reds

Last MLB appearance
- October 5, 1986, for the Cincinnati Reds

MLB statistics
- Batting average: .279
- Hits: 2,732
- Home runs: 379
- Runs batted in: 1,652
- Managerial record: 74–84
- Winning %: .468
- Stats at Baseball Reference
- Managerial record at Baseball Reference

Teams
- As player: Cincinnati Reds (1964–1976); Montreal Expos (1977–1979); Boston Red Sox (1980–1982); Philadelphia Phillies (1983); Cincinnati Reds (1984–1986); As manager: Cincinnati Reds (1993); Florida Marlins (2001); As coach: Cincinnati Reds (1987–1992)

Career highlights and awards
- 7× All-Star (1967–1970, 1974–1976); 3× World Series champion (1975, 1976, 1990); Cincinnati Reds No. 24 retired; Cincinnati Reds Hall of Fame

Member of the National

Baseball Hall of Fame
- Induction: 2000
- Vote: 77.2% (ninth ballot)

Atanasio "Tony" Pérez Rigal (born May 14, 1942), nicknamed Big Dog, is a Cuban-American former professional baseball player, coach and manager. He played in Major League Baseball (MLB) as a first baseman and third baseman from 1964 through 1986, most notably as a member of the Cincinnati Reds dynasty that won four National League pennants and two World Series championships between 1970 and 1976. He also played for the Montreal Expos, Boston Red Sox and the Philadelphia Phillies.

A seven-time All-Star, Pérez averaged more than 100 runs batted in per season from 1970 to 1976 for the powerful Cincinnati team that became known as the Big Red Machine for their dominance of the National League in the mid-1970s. Variously nicknamed "Big Dog", "Big Doggie", and "Doggie", he was one of the most popular players in Reds history.

After his playing career, Pérez became a coach and later managed the Reds and the Florida Marlins. From 1993 through the 2017 season, he was Special Assistant to the General Manager with the Marlins. In 2000, Pérez was inducted into the Baseball Hall of Fame.

== Early life ==
Pérez was born in Ciego de Ávila, Cuba in 1942, the son of José Manuel and Teodora (Rígal) Pérez. Tony and his parents and siblings all lived in a two-bedroom row house owned by the sugar mill where Tony's father, and eventually Tony, worked. Tony later played shortstop for the Mill's baseball team, Central Violeta.

He was signed to a pro contract in 1960 at age 17 by Cincinnati Reds scout Tony Pacheco while playing on the Camagüey sugar factory team. He was assigned to the instructional team of the Reds' AAA affiliate Havana Sugar Kings. His "bonus" for signing with the Reds was the $2.50 cost of a visa and a plane ticket to Miami, Florida.

== Career ==
=== Early days ===
Pérez arrived in Florida in the spring of 1960 and participated in the Reds' spring training in Tampa. He played his first minor league game for the Reds' Class D affiliate in Geneva, New York at age 17 on May 1, 1960, in the season-opener for the New York–Pennsylvania League team. Starting at second base, his first professional hit was a triple as he went 1–5 in a 6–5, 13-inning loss to the Auburn Yankees. He went hitless in the next game (the Redlegs' home opener) in a 17–16 Redlegs win, and in the next game he got the team's only hit (a single) in a 5–0 loss. On June 25 he was placed on the disabled list. That same day, he was replaced on the active roster by just-signed 19-year-old Pete Rose, who was inserted into the starting lineup at second base. Upon Pérez's return, Rose remained at second base and Pérez played third base. Another of his teammates was Martín Dihigo Jr., son of Baseball Hall of Fame member and Negro leagues great and Cuban native Martín Dihigo. Pérez hit .279 with 6 home runs in 104 games.

In 1961 he again played for Geneva and set several team batting records, batting .348 with 27 home runs in 121 games. In 1962 he was promoted to the Class B Rocky Mount Leafs in the Carolina League. He reported two weeks late, as he had trouble getting out of his homeland of Cuba. In 100 games, he hit .292 with 18 home runs and 74 RBI, making the all-star team as a third baseman, but his season was cut short after those 100 games due to a broken ankle. In 1963 he was promoted to the Macon Peaches of the Class AA South Atlantic League, where in 69 games as a third baseman he hit .309 with 11 home runs and 48 RBIs before being promoted that same year to the Class AAA San Diego Padres of the Pacific Coast League. For San Diego that year, in 8 games he hit .379 with 1 home run and 5 RBI.

Playing for the Padres in 1964, Pérez, now playing first base, was named Most Valuable Player in the Pacific Coast League. Pérez hit .309 with 34 home runs and 107 RBI. He was called up to the Reds and played his first two games in a doubleheader on July 26, 1964, at Cincinnati's Crosley Field. In his debut he started at first base, and in his first at-bat he drew a walk against left-handed pitcher Joe Gibbon. He went 0–2 against Gibbon and Don Schwall in a 7–2 Reds win, then went 0–4 against pitcher Bob Veale in a 5–1 Pirates win.

The following day he started at first base and batted fifth against the Braves at Milwaukee County Stadium. In an 11–2 Reds win, he got his first hit, a second-inning double off Denny Lemaster, and then scored his first run on a Johnny Edwards double. In the seventh inning he got his first RBI, a single off Lemaster to score Frank Robinson.

From 1964 through 1966, he platooned at first base, primarily with Deron Johnson and Gordy Coleman. His first career home run, a grand slam, came in the Reds' second game of 1965, at home in Crosley Field against Milwaukee – and again against Denny Lemaster. The grand slam came with 2 outs and scored Vada Pinson, Frank Robinson, and Deron Johnson.

Pérez became the Reds' starter at third base in 1967 and was selected to his first All-Star team in 1967. The game, played on July 11, 1967, at Anaheim Stadium, went into 15 innings, the longest All-Star Game in history (since equaled by the 2008 game). Pérez's home run off future fellow Hall of Famer Catfish Hunter propelled the National League to a 2–1 victory. He was subsequently voted the game's Most Valuable Player.

In 1970, Pérez hit the first home run in Pittsburgh's Three Rivers Stadium. The 1970 campaign was his finest year, statistically: in addition to his 129 RBIs, Pérez hit .317, slugged 40 home runs and scored 107 runs. His performance through the first half of the season (.363, 28 HRs) ranks among the finest in the history of the sport. He came in third in the Most Valuable Player voting behind Billy Williams and Reds' teammate and winner Johnny Bench.

Pérez also played winter ball for 10 seasons between 1964–65 and 1982–83 in the Puerto Rico Baseball League for the Santurce Crabbers (Cangrejeros de Santurce). He won the batting title and was named league MVP in 1966–67.

=== Big Red Machine ===
After platooning and playing first base in the early part of his career (1964–66) with the Cincinnati Reds, he became a perennial all-star starting at third base from 1967 to 1971. From 1972 onward he starred at first base. Pérez was one of the premier RBI men of his generation, driving in 100 or more runs seven times in his 23-year-long career. In an 11-year stretch from 1967 to 1977, Pérez drove in 90 or more runs each year, with a high of 129 RBIs in 1970. During the decade of the 1970s, Pérez was second among all major-leaguers in RBI, with 954, behind only his teammate Johnny Bench.

Beginning in 1970, the Reds went to the World Series four times in seven years, winning back-to-back world championships in 1975 and 1976, with Pérez starting at first base. Following the Reds sweep of the Phillies in the 1976 League Championship Series and New York Yankees in the 1976 World Series (the only time a team has ever swept the postseason since the League Championship Series was introduced in 1969), Pérez was traded to the Montreal Expos with Will McEnaney for Woodie Fryman and Dale Murray. After his trade, the "Big Red Machine"—considered one of baseball's all-time greatest teams—sputtered and never again got into the Series, reaching the playoffs but one more time in 1979. Sparky Anderson, the Reds manager during the championships of the 1970s, has stated in many interviews since that Pérez was the leader, and heart and soul of those teams.

After three seasons in Montreal (in which he hit 46 home runs with 242 RBIs and a .281 batting average), for the 1980 season, Pérez signed as a free agent with the Boston Red Sox. In his first season with the Red Sox, he finished in the top 10 in the American League in home runs (25), RBIs (105) and intentional walks (11), and won the Lou Gehrig Memorial Award.

=== Cincinnati reunion ===
For the 1983 season, Pérez reunited with "Big Red Machine" teammates Pete Rose and Joe Morgan on the Philadelphia Phillies. Still a feared hitter based on his reputation, Pérez was a reserve player for their Phillies during their run to the World Series that year, and batted .242 in his five World Series appearances. Following the season, he returned to the Cincinnati Reds as a free agent, where he remained until his retirement following the 1986 season.

In 1984, at age 42, he became the oldest player to hit a walk-off pinch-hit home run (off the Pirates' Don Robinson). On May 13, 1985, batting against Philadelphia Phillies' reliever Dave Rucker, he became the oldest player (44) to hit a grand slam, breaking a 70-year-old record held by Honus Wagner. The new record stood until Julio Franco broke it at age 46 in 2004. Pérez was named National League Player of the Week during the final week of his career at age 44, when he went 8-for-19 with a home run, three doubles, and 6 runs batted in.

His final career hit and RBI came on October 4, 1986, at Riverfront Stadium when he hit a solo home run off San Diego Padres pitcher Ed Whitson in a 10–7 Reds win. The following day was the Reds' last game of the year and the final game of his career. In his final at-bat, he flied out against Andy Hawkins in a 2–1 Padres' win.

=== Managerial career ===
After serving six seasons as a coach for the Reds, Perez was hired as manager for the 1993 season. The Reds started slowly with a 12-18 record, but quickly went on a seven-game winning streak before going on a seven-game West Coast road trip. Before a game against the San Francisco Giants, Reds beat writer Hal McCoy approached Perez with an idea to bat catcher Joe Oliver in the game instead of backup catcher Dan Wilson, since Oliver hit Giants starting pitcher Bud Black well. Perez took McCoy's suggestion and the Reds won the game, the only win they would have on the trip. McCoy wrote about his meeting in his column shortly thereafter. Reds general manager Jim Bowden read the column and was angry that Perez allowed McCoy to influence a managerial decision and fired Perez with the team having a 20-24 record.

Shortly after being fired by the Reds, Perez was hired by the Florida Marlins as special assistant to the general manager and later special assistant to the team president. In 2001, he replaced John Boles as manager of the Marlins after a 22-26 start and managed the team to the end of the season, going 54-60. Perez remained with the Marlins' organization until 2017.

=== Legacy ===
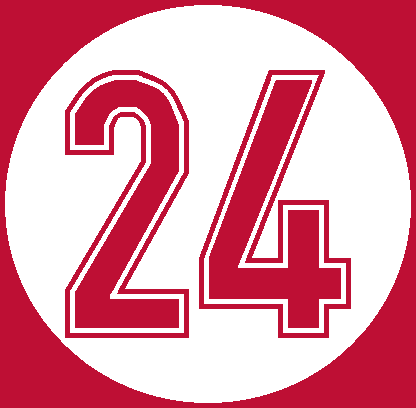
Tony Pérez's number 24 was retired by the Cincinnati Reds in 2000.

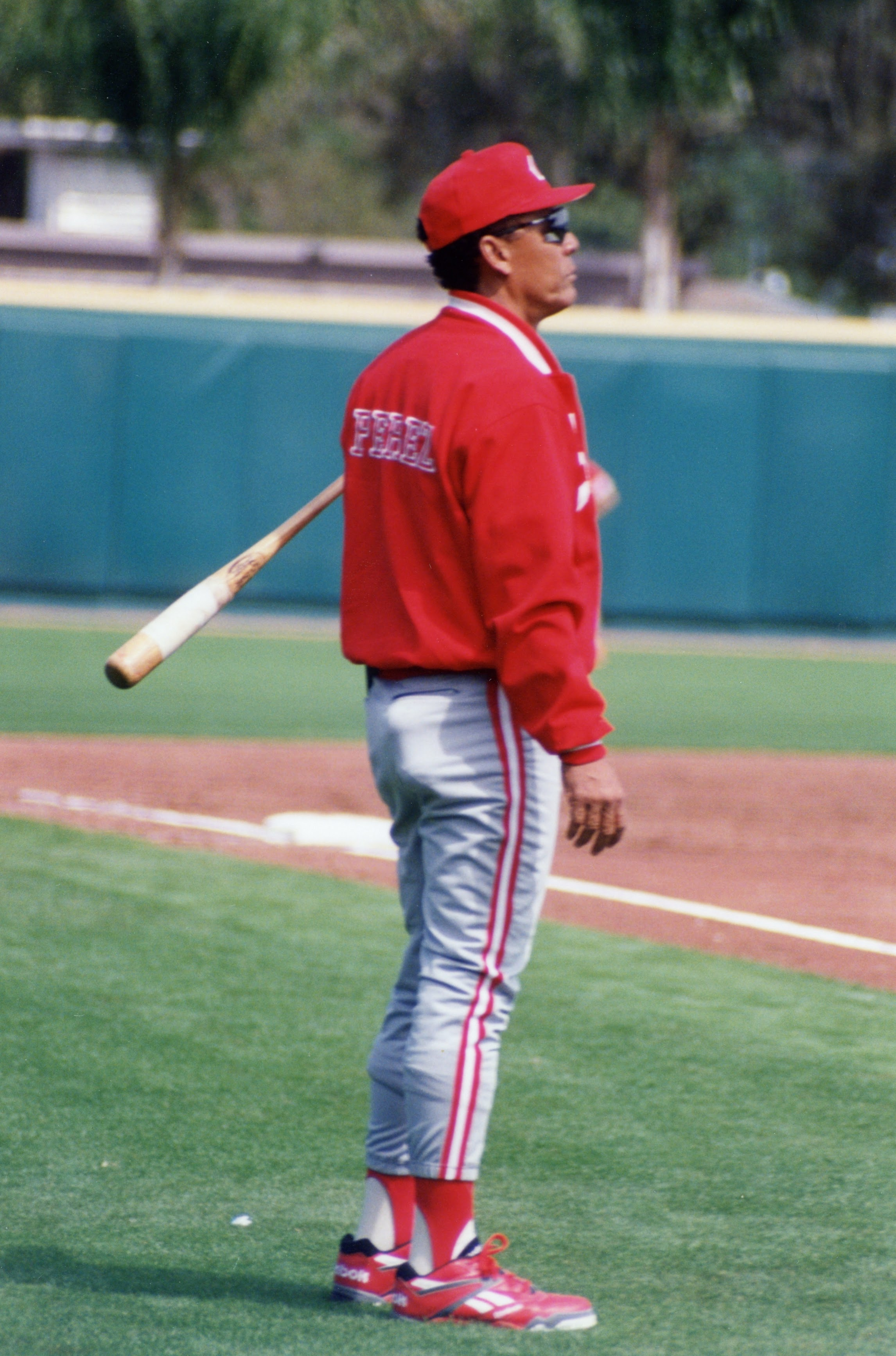
Perez managing the Cincinnati Reds during Spring Training in 1993 in Bradenton, Florida

Pérez was inducted into the Cincinnati Reds Hall of Fame in 1998. On May 27, 2000, in an on-field pre-game ceremony at Cinergy Field with family and former teammates and managers, the Reds retired his number, 24.

In 2000, Pérez was elected to the Baseball Hall of Fame in Cooperstown, New York, garnering 385 votes on 499 ballots for a total of 77.15%, just over the three-quarters minimum required for induction. He was inducted in July 2000 along with Sparky Anderson, Carlton Fisk, Bid McPhee and Turkey Stearnes. In his induction speech, he said, "I doubt that a king at his coronation feels better than me today." Each year since his induction, he has attended the weekend ceremonies, including riding in the annual parade and playing in the annual golf outing and old-timers' baseball game.

Pérez was inducted into the Hispanic Heritage Baseball Museum Hall of Fame in 2001 at a pre-game ceremony held at the San Francisco Giants' Pacific Bell Park. That same year he threw out the ceremonial first pitch at the 2001 All-Star Game at Safeco Field in Seattle. He had played at the Kingdome in Seattle during the 1979 All-Star Game. Pérez in 1998 was inducted into the Caribbean Baseball Hall of Fame, which honors those that have made significant achievements in the Caribbean Series. He was one of 24 inaugural inductees into the Latino Baseball Hall of Fame in 2010. He was inducted in 2010 to the Cuban Sports Hall of Fame.

In 2011, with Pérez and his sons in attendance at opening ceremonies of the Museo del Deporte de Puerto Rico in Guaynabo, Puerto Rico, his adopted homeland, presented him with a surprise honor. He was proclaimed an official "native son" of Puerto Rico "for his dedication to the commonwealth as a family and community member, and for his impressive baseball accolades while representing the island." Also present were fellow Hall of Famers Orlando Cepeda and Roberto Alomar, as well as Vera Zabala, the widow of Roberto Clemente.

On August 10, 2014, at the annual Reds Hall of Fame Induction Gala, former Reds teammates Johnny Bench and Joe Morgan along with Pérez himself announced that the Reds would erect a statue of Pérez outside Great American Ball Park.

Perez's statue at Great American Ball Park

On August 21–22, 2015, the Cincinnati Reds held Tony Pérez Weekend during a series with the Arizona Diamondbacks. At least 12 players of the Big Red Machine were part of a post-game ceremony that Friday's night. On Saturday, a bronze statue of Pérez was unveiled near the entrance to Great American Ball Park. The larger-than-life bronze statue by Tom Tsuchiya shows Pérez hitting the 2-run homer that helped spur the Reds to victory in the 1975 World Series. Fans attending the game received replica statues, and there was a pre-game ceremony honoring Pérez, followed by him throwing the ceremonial first pitch.

Tommy John thought Pérez was one of the toughest hitters he ever had to face due to his ability to hit to right-center field with power. "He waited on the ball well and I couldn't throw hard enough to get it by him inside," John recollected.

=== Managerial record ===
Team	From	To	Regular season record			Post–season record		
Team	From	To	W	L	Win %	W	L	Win %
Cincinnati Reds	1993	1993	20	24	.455	—		
Florida Marlins	2001	2001	54	60	.474	—		
Total			74	84	.468	0	0	–

== Personal life ==
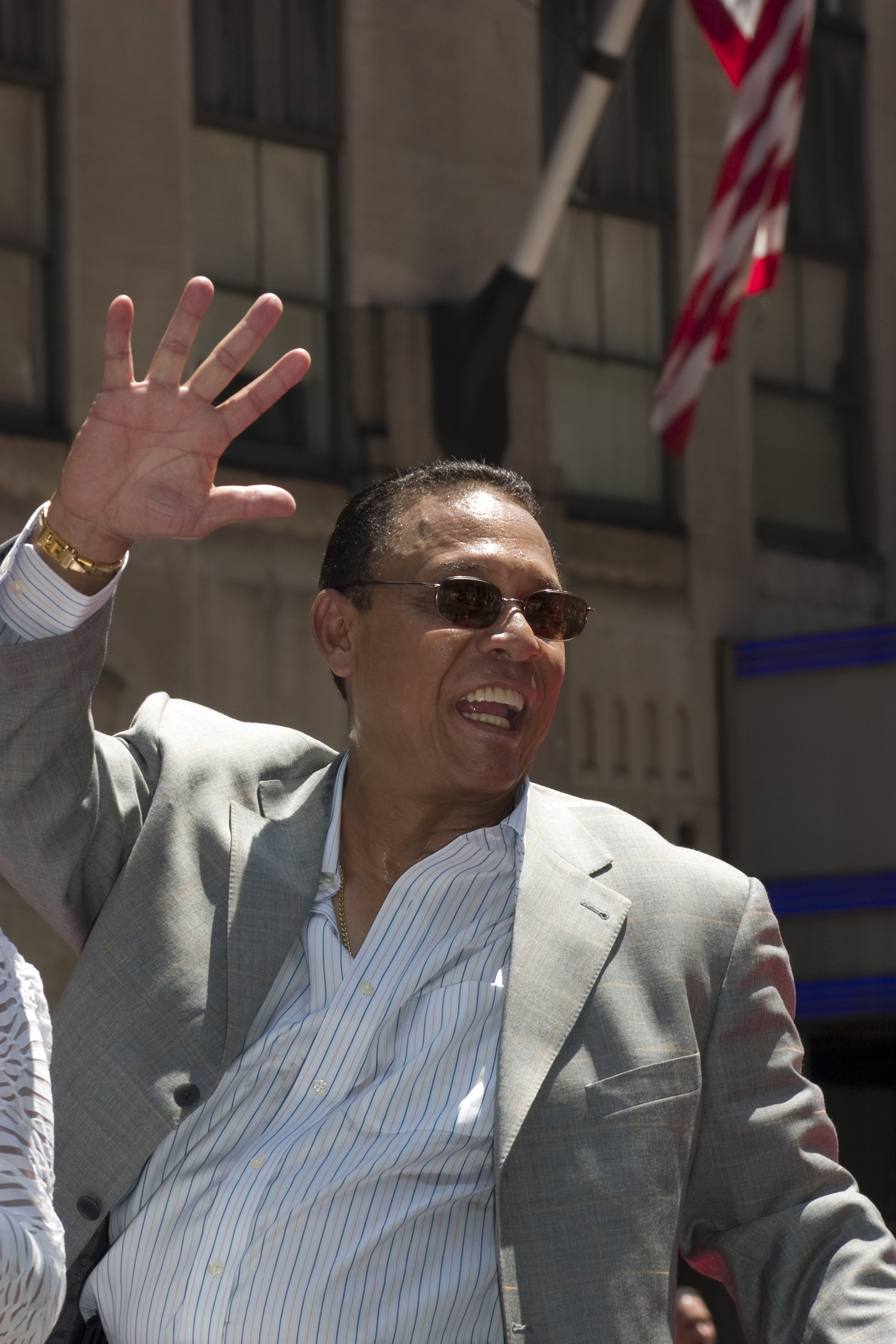
Pérez at the 2008 All-Star Game Red Carpet Parade

While playing winter ball in Puerto Rico in 1964, Pérez met Juana ("Pituka") de la Cantera, daughter of Pablo de la Cantera and Edilia Cortina. Also of Cuban descent, she grew up in Puerto Rico. Four months after meeting, the couple married in early 1965. They both became American citizens on October 18, 1971 in Cincinnati. They have two sons, both born in Cincinnati, Victor Pérez (May 11, 1966) and Eduardo Pérez (September 11, 1969).

Victor played one season in the Reds' minor league system in 1990. He attended and graduated from Xavier University in Cincinnati with a Bachelor of Applied Science degree in Finance and Computer Science. He later moved to New York City, where he worked in real estate and in telecommunications. He also attended acting school there and became a professional actor, first in New York City, and then for several years in London.

Eduardo was an All-American third baseman at Florida State University and played in the College World Series. He was drafted in the first round (17th overall pick) by the California Angels. He played Major League Baseball for 13 seasons. After retiring as a player, he served as an ESPN commentator for five years. In 2009, he managed Leones de Ponce to the Puerto Rican League championship, and in 2011 and 2012 he was hitting coach for the Miami Marlins. He was bench coach of the Houston Astros for the 2013 season. In 2016, Eduardo joined SiriusXM's MLB Network Radio hosting The Leadoff Spot with Steve Phillips. He is married to Mirba (Rivera) and they have two daughters, Andreanna and Juliana.

In November 1972, Pérez was granted a 20-day visa to return to Cuba for the first time since a 1963 trip; however, the visa did not permit his wife and children to go, according to "Latino Baseball Legends: An Encyclopedia" by Lew Freedman. He took 17 suitcases of gifts, clothes, and medical supplies and reunited with his family in Central Violeta, Cuba—a 400-mile train ride from Havana.

Tony's father, Jose Manuel – with whom Tony worked alongside as a teenager at the Camagüey sugar factory, hauling and stamping the company's name on the bags – died in 1979 at age 84 (some sources list his year of death as 1977). Tony has stated that, during his playing career, his family in Cuba would listen to the Voice of America, which would give daily updates on Cuban players playing in the majors.

Tony's mother, Teodora ("Tita"), was 88 when Tony called her with the news in 2000 that he had been elected to the Hall of Fame. Tony was able to make a return visit to Cuba in 2002, only this time with his sons. Teodora died in 2008. Tony's oldest sister died in 1997. In 2000, for a luncheon honoring Tony, the Marlins arranged to surprise him by helping his two living sisters, Argelia and Gloria, secure visas and come to Miami from their homes in Central Violeta, Camagüey, Cuba.

Pérez has cited Cuban-born Minnie Miñoso as his boyhood idol. Pérez advocated for many years in articles, speeches, and discussions to get Minoso elected to the Baseball Hall of Fame.

A 326-page biography, Tony Pérez: From Cuba to Cooperstown, written by John Erardi, was published on April 2, 2018.

== See also ==
- List of Major League Baseball career home run leaders
- List of Major League Baseball career hits leaders
- List of Major League Baseball career doubles leaders
- List of Major League Baseball career runs scored leaders
- List of Major League Baseball career runs batted in leaders
- List of Major League Baseball career total bases leaders
- Cincinnati Reds Hall of Fame
