= 1976 Cincinnati Reds season =

1976 Cincinnati Reds
- World Series champions National League champions National League West champions
- League: National League
- Division: West
- Ballpark: Riverfront Stadium
- City: Cincinnati
- Record: 102–60 (.630)
- Divisional place: 1st
- Owners: Louis Nippert
- General managers: Bob Howsam
- Managers: Sparky Anderson
- Television: WLWT (Ken Coleman, Bill Brown)
- Radio: WLW (Marty Brennaman, Joe Nuxhall)

The 1976 Cincinnati Reds season was the 107th season for the franchise in Major League Baseball, and their 7th and 6th full season at Riverfront Stadium. The Reds entered the season as the reigning World Series champions. The Reds dominated the league all season and won their second consecutive National League West title with a record of 102–60, finishing ten games ahead of the Los Angeles Dodgers. With the best record in baseball, they went on to defeat the Philadelphia Phillies in the NLCS in three straight games to reach the World Series. They proceeded to win the title in four straight games over the New York Yankees. They were the third National League team to achieve this distinction, and the first since the 1921–22 New York Giants. The Reds drew 2,629,708 fans to their home games at Riverfront Stadium, an all-time franchise attendance record. As mentioned above, the Reds swept through the entire postseason with their sweeps of the Phillies and Yankees, achieving a record of 7–0. As of 2026, the Reds are the only team in baseball history to sweep through an entire postseason in the divisional era.

== Offseason ==
- October 24, 1975: Joaquín Andújar was traded by the Reds to the Houston Astros for players to be named later. The Astros completed the deal by sending Luis Sánchez and Carlos Alfonso (minors) to the Reds on December 12.
- December 12, 1975: Clay Carroll was traded by the Reds to the Chicago White Sox for Rich Hinton and Jeff Sovern (minors).

== Regular season ==
=== Season summary ===
The "Big Red Machine" was at the height of its power in the 1976 season, with four future Hall-of-Famers (Johnny Bench, Joe Morgan, Tony Pérez, and manager Sparky Anderson), the future MLB all-time hits leader Pete Rose, and a notable supporting line up including Dave Concepción at shortstop, and Ken Griffey, César Gerónimo, and George Foster in the outfield. This would also turn out to be the final full year for the Big Red Machine, Perez would be traded in the offseason to the Montreal Expos.

The Reds retained their NL pennant by winning the NLCS in three games over the Phillies, and their second consecutive World Series title by defeating the Yankees in four games, becoming only the second team to sweep a World Series from the Yankees (following the 1963 Los Angeles Dodgers). By sweeping both the Phillies and Yankees, the Reds became the first and only team to have a perfect postseason since the League Championship Series was started in 1969. Joe Morgan was the NL's Most Valuable Player for the second straight season and Johnny Bench was the World Series MVP.

To celebrate the National League's 100th anniversary, the Reds and several other teams adopted pillbox-style caps.

=== Season standings ===
NL West
Team	W	L	Pct.	GB	Home	Road
Cincinnati Reds	102	60	.630	—	49‍–‍32	53‍–‍28
Los Angeles Dodgers	92	70	.568	10	49‍–‍32	43‍–‍38
Houston Astros	80	82	.494	22	46‍–‍36	34‍–‍46
San Francisco Giants	74	88	.457	28	40‍–‍41	34‍–‍47
San Diego Padres	73	89	.451	29	42‍–‍38	31‍–‍51
Atlanta Braves	70	92	.432	32	34‍–‍47	36‍–‍45

=== Record vs. opponents ===
1976 National League record Sources:
Team	ATL	CHC	CIN	HOU	LAD	MON	NYM	PHI	PIT	SD	SF	STL
Atlanta	—	6–6	6–12	7–11	8–10	8–4	4–8	5–7	3–9	10–8	9–9	4–8
Chicago	6–6	—	3–9	5–7	3–9	11–7	5–13	8–10	8–10	6–6	8–4	12–6
Cincinnati	12–6	9–3	—	12–6	13–5	9–3	6–6	5–7	8–4	13–5	9–9	6–6
Houston	11–7	7–5	6–12	—	5–13	10–2	6–6	4–8	2–10	10–8	10–8	9–3
Los Angeles	10–8	9–3	5–13	13–5	—	10–2	7–5	5–7	9–3	6–12	8–10	10–2
Montreal	4–8	7–11	3–9	2–10	2–10	—	8–10	3–15	8–10	4–8	7–5	7–11
New York	8–4	13–5	6–6	6–6	5–7	10–8	—	5–13	10–8	7–5	7–5	9–9
Philadelphia	7-5	10–8	7–5	8–4	7–5	15–3	13–5	—	8–10	8–4	6–6	12–6
Pittsburgh	9–3	10–8	4–8	10–2	3–9	10–8	8–10	10–8	—	7–5	9–3	12–6
San Diego	8–10	6–6	5–13	8–10	12–6	8–4	5–7	4–8	5–7	—	8–10	4–8
San Francisco	9–9	4–8	9–9	8–10	10–8	5–7	5–7	6–6	3–9	10–8	—	5–7
St. Louis	8–4	6–12	6–6	3–9	2–10	11–7	9–9	6–12	6–12	8–4	7–5	—

=== Notable transactions ===
- April 5, 1976: Merv Rettenmund was traded by the Reds to the San Diego Padres for Rudy Meoli.

=== Roster ===
1976 Cincinnati Reds
Roster
Pitchers: 42 Santo Alcalá; 43 Jack Billingham; 34 Pedro Borbón; 44 Pat Darcy; 49 Rawly Eastwick; 35 Don Gullett; 53 Joe Henderson; 36 Rich Hinton; 37 Will McEnaney; 38 Gary Nolan; 32 Fred Norman; 45 Manny Sarmiento; 40 Pat Zachry	Catchers: 5 Johnny Bench; 9 Bill Plummer; 7 Don Werner; Infielders: 13 Dave Concepción; 22 Dan Driessen; 23 Doug Flynn; 8 Joe Morgan; 24 Tony Pérez; 14 Pete Rose	Outfielders: 33 Ed Armbrister; 11 Bob Bailey; 15 George Foster; 20 César Gerónimo; 30 Ken Griffey; 21 Mike Lum; 19 Joel Youngblood	Manager: 10 Sparky Anderson; Coaches: 18 Ted Kluszewski; 2 Russ Nixon; 3 George Scherger; 4 Larry Shepard

=== Game log ===
Game Log
April (10–7)

#	Date	Opponent	Score	Record	Win	Loss	Save	Attendance
1	April 8	Houston Astros	W 11–5	1–0	Gary Nolan	J. R. Richard	Pedro Borbón	52,949
2	April 10	Houston Astros	W 13–7	2–0	Jack Billingham	Larry Dierker	Rawly Eastwick	16,728
3	April 11	Houston Astros	W 9–3	3–0	Pat Darcy	Joe Niekro		53,390
4	April 13	@ Atlanta Braves	W 6–1	4–0	Fred Norman	Pablo Torrealba		37,973
5	April 15	@ Atlanta Braves	L 5–10	4–1	Phil Niekro	Jack Billingham		15,716
6	April 16	San Francisco Giants	L 7–14	4–2	Jim Barr	Pat Darcy		37,147
7	April 17	San Francisco Giants	W 11–0	5–2	Fred Norman	Ed Halicki		21,219
8	April 18	San Francisco Giants	L 1–5	5–3	John Montefusco	Gary Nolan	Gary Lavelle	23,701
9	April 20	San Diego Padres	L 5–7	5–4	Butch Metzger	Will McEnaney		18,126
10	April 21	San Diego Padres	W 5–4	6–4	Fred Norman	Dave Wehrmeister	Rawly Eastwick	16,603
11	April 23	@ Montreal Expos	L 4–5	6–5	Don Stanhouse	Jack Billingham		5,306
12	April 24	@ Montreal Expos	W 6–4 (11)	7–5	Rawly Eastwick	Don Carrithers		11,190
13	April 25	@ Montreal Expos	W 7–0	8–5	Don Gullett	Steve Renko	Pat Darcy	8,095
14	April 26	@ Philadelphia Phillies	L 9–10	8–6	Tug McGraw	Rawly Eastwick		16,565
15	April 27	@ Philadelphia Phillies	W 7–3	9–6	Jack Billingham	Tom Underwood		17,818
16	April 28	@ Philadelphia Phillies	L 6–7	9–7	Jim Lonborg	Pat Darcy	Tug McGraw	20,215
17	April 30	Montreal Expos	W 7–2	10–7	Gary Nolan	Dan Warthen		20,166

May (18–10)

#	Date	Opponent	Score	Record	Win	Loss	Save	Attendance
26	May 1	Montreal Expos	W 6–1	11–7	Don Gullett	Don Carrithers		28,138
27	May 2	Montreal Expos	L 4–8 (16)	11–8	Don Stanhouse	Pat Darcy		49,285
28	May 4	@ New York Mets	L 3–5	11–9	Tom Seaver	Fred Norman	Skip Lockwood	11,205
29								
30								
31								
32								
33								
34								
35								
36								
37								
38								
39								
40								
41								
42								
43								
44								
45								

June (18–12)

#	Date	Opponent	Score	Record	Win	Loss	Save	Attendance
46								
47								
48								
49								
50								
51								
52								
53								
54								
55								
56								
57								
58								
59								
60								
61								
62								
63	June 18	@ Philadelphia Phillies	L 5–6	39–24	Jim Lonborg	Jack Billingham	Gene Garber	50,635
64	June 19	@ Philadelphia Phillies	W 4–3	40–24	Gary Nolan	Ron Reed	Rawly Eastwick	36,808
65	June 20	@ Philadelphia Phillies	L 1–6	40–25	Jim Kaat	Don Gullett		38,669
66								
67								
68	June 23	Philadelphia Phillies	L 2–4	42–26	Ron Reed	Pedro Borbón	Gene Garber	35,266
69	June 24	Philadelphia Phillies	L 4–5	42–27	Jim Kaat	Gary Nolan	Tug McGraw	34,053
70								
71								
72								
73								
74								
75								

July (20–9)

#	Date	Opponent	Score	Record	Win	Loss	Save	Attendance
76								
77								
78								
79								
80								
81								
82								
83								
84								
85								
86								
87								
88								
89								
90								
91								
92								
93								
94								
95								
96								
97								
98								
99								
100								
101								
102								
103								
104								

August (18–11)

#	Date	Opponent	Score	Record	Win	Loss	Save	Attendance
105								
106								
107								
108								
109								
110								
111								
112								
113								
114								
115								
116								
117								
118								
119								
120								
121								
122								
123								
124								
125								
126								
127								
128	August 26	Philadelphia Phillies	L 5–4 (13)	80–48	Tug McGraw	Rawly Eastwick		38,094
129	August 27	Philadelphia Phillies	W 4–1	81–48	Fred Norman	Tom Underwood	Pedro Borbón	49,821
130	August 28	Philadelphia Phillies	W 8–7	82–48	Rawly Eastwick	Tug McGraw		51,091
131	August 29	Philadelphia Phillies	W 6–5 (15)	83–48	Santo Alcalá	Jim Kaat		51,376
132								
133								

September (16–10)

#	Date	Opponent	Score	Record	Win	Loss	Save	Attendance
134								
135								
136								
137								
138								
139								
140								
141								
142								
143								
144								
145								
146								
147								
148								
149								
150								
151								
152								
153								
154								
155								
156								
157								
158								
159								

October (2–1)

#	Date	Opponent	Score	Record	Win	Loss	Save	Attendance
160								
161								
162								

== Player stats ==
=Indicates team leader

= Indicates league leader

=== Batting ===
==== Starters by position ====
Note: Pos=Position; G=Games played; AB=At bats; R=Runs scored; H=Hits; Avg.=Batting average; HR=Home runs; RBI=Runs batted in; SB=Stolen Bases

Pos	Player	G	AB	R	H	Avg.	HR	RBI	SB
C	Johnny Bench	135	465	62	109	.234	16	74	13
1B	Tony Pérez	139	527	77	137	.260	19	91	10
2B	Joe Morgan	141	472	113	151	.320	27	111	60
3B	Pete Rose	162	665	130	215	.323	10	63	9
SS	Dave Concepción	152	576	74	162	.281	9	69	21
LF	George Foster	144	562	86	172	.306	29	121	17
CF	César Gerónimo	149	486	59	149	.307	2	49	22
RF	Ken Griffey	148	562	111	189	.336	6	74	34

==== Other batters ====
Note: G=Games played; AB=At bats; R=Runs scored; H=Hits; Avg.=Batting average; HR=Home runs; RBI=Runs batted in; SB=Stolen Bases

Player	G	AB	R	H	Avg.	HR	RBI	SB
Dan Driessen	98	219	32	54	.247	7	44	14
Doug Flynn	93	219	20	62	.283	1	20	2
Bill Plummer	56	153	16	38	.248	4	19	0
Mike Lum	84	136	15	31	.228	3	20	0
Bob Bailey	69	124	17	37	.298	6	23	0
Joel Youngblood	55	57	8	11	.193	0	1	1
Don Werner	3	4	0	2	.500	0	1	0

=== Pitching ===
==== Starting pitchers ====
Note: G=Games pitched; IP=Innings pitched; W=Wins; L=Losses; ERA=Earned run average; SO=Strikeouts

Player	G	IP	W	L	ERA	SO
Gary Nolan	34	239.1	15	9	3.46	113
Pat Zachry	38	204.0	14	7	2.74	143
Fred Norman	33	180.1	12	7	3.10	126
Jack Billingham	34	177.0	12	10	4.32	76
Santo Alcalá	30	132.0	11	4	4.70	67
Don Gullett	23	126.0	11	3	3.00	64

==== Other pitchers ====
Note: G=Games pitched; IP=Innings pitched; W=Wins; L=Losses; ERA=Earned run average; SO=Strikeouts

Player	G	IP	W	L	ERA	SO
Pat Darcy	11	39.0	2	3	6.23	15

==== Relief pitchers ====
Note: G=Games pitched; W=Wins; L=Losses; SV=Saves; ERA=Earned run average; SO=Strikeouts

Player	G	W	L	SV	ERA	SO
Rawly Eastwick	71	11	5	26	2.09	70
Pedro Borbón	69	4	3	8	3.35	53
Will McEnaney	55	2	6	7	4.85	28
Manny Sarmiento	22	5	1	0	2.06	20
Rich Hinton	12	1	2	0	7.64	8
Joe Henderson	4	2	0	0	0.00	7

== Postseason ==
=== NLCS ===
==== Game 1 ====
October 9, Veterans Stadium

Team	1	2	3	4	5	6	7	8	9	R	H	E
Cincinnati	0	0	1	0	0	2	0	3	0	6	10	0
Philadelphia	1	0	0	0	0	0	0	0	2	3	6	1
W: Don Gullett (1–0) L: Steve Carlton (0–1) SV: None
HRs: CIN – George Foster (1) PHI – None

Reds starter Don Gullett held the Phils to two hits in eight strong innings and helped his own cause with an RBI single in the sixth and a two-run double in the eighth. George Foster added a solo homer.

==== Game 2 ====
October 10, Veterans Stadium

Team	1	2	3	4	5	6	7	8	9	R	H	E
Cincinnati	0	0	0	0	0	4	2	0	0	6	6	0
Philadelphia	0	1	0	0	1	0	0	0	0	2	10	1
W: Pat Zachry (1–0) L: Jim Lonborg (0–1) SV: Pedro Borbón (1)
HRs: CIN – None PHI – Greg Luzinski (1)

==== Game 3 ====
October 12, Riverfront Stadium

Team	1	2	3	4	5	6	7	8	9	R	H	E
Philadelphia	0	0	0	1	0	0	2	2	1	6	11	0
Cincinnati	0	0	0	0	0	0	4	0	3	7	9	2
W: Rawly Eastwick (1–0) L: Gene Garber (0–1) SV: None
HRs: CIN – George Foster (2) Johnny Bench (1) PHI – None

=== 1976 World Series ===
==== Summary ====
NL Cincinnati Reds (4) vs. AL New York Yankees (0)
Game	Road	Home	Score	Date	Location	Attendance	Time of Game
1	Yankees	Reds	5–1	Sat. Oct 16 (D)	Riverfront Stadium	54,826	2:10
2	Yankees	Reds	4–3	Sun. Oct 17 (N)	Riverfront Stadium	54,816	2:33
3	Reds	Yankees	6–2	Tue. Oct 19 (N)	Yankee Stadium	56,667	2:40
4	Reds	Yankees	7–2	Thu. Oct 21 (N)	Yankee Stadium	56,700	2:36

== Awards and honors ==
- Johnny Bench, Babe Ruth Award
- Johnny Bench, World Series Most Valuable Player Award
- George Foster, All-star Game Most Valuable Player Award
- Pete Rose, Roberto Clemente Award

1976 Major League Baseball All-Star Game

- Johnny Bench, catcher, starter
- Joe Morgan, second base, starter
- Pete Rose, third base, starter
- Dave Concepción, shortstop, starter
- George Foster, outfield, starter
- Tony Pérez, first base, reserve
- Ken Griffey, Sr., outfielder, reserve

== Farm system ==
Level	Team	League	Manager
AAA	Indianapolis Indians	American Association	Jim Snyder
AA	Trois-Rivières Aigles	Eastern League	Roy Majtyka
A	Tampa Tarpons	Florida State League	Ron Brand
A-Short Season	Eugene Emeralds	Northwest League	Greg Riddoch
Rookie	Billings Mustangs	Pioneer League	Jim Hoff
