= Jim Willoughby =

American baseball player (born 1949)

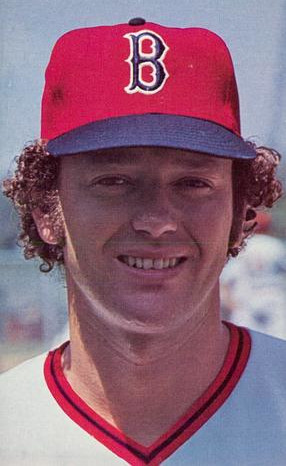
- Pitcher
- Born: January 31, 1949 (age 77); Salinas, California, U.S.
- Batted: Right Threw: Right

MLB debut
- September 5, 1971, for the San Francisco Giants

Last MLB appearance
- September 28, 1978, for the Chicago White Sox

MLB statistics
- Win–loss record: 26–36
- Earned run average: 3.79
- Strikeouts: 250
- Stats at Baseball Reference

Teams
- San Francisco Giants (1971–1974); Boston Red Sox (1975–1977); Chicago White Sox (1978)

James Arthur Willoughby (born January 31, 1949) is an American former pitcher in Major League Baseball who played from 1971 through 1978 for the San Francisco Giants, Boston Red Sox and Chicago White Sox. Listed at 6 ft 2 in (1.88 m) and 185 lb (84 kg), he batted and threw right handed.

In his entire career from the rotation to the bullpen, Willoughby was a ground ball pitcher who relied on a sinker ball and a slider, which he consistently threw from a three-quarters arm slot with a high leg lift. Eventually, he used a slow curveball, low and just off the outside of the plate.

== Early life ==
"Willow", as he was often called, was the only son of three children born to James Roger Willoughby and Marlene Dickinson Willoughby. He had Pottawatomi heritage in addition to his British ancestry, as his great-aunt Mamie Echo Hawk served as the tribe’s chief lobbyist in Washington DC office for many years.

Born in Salinas, California, Willoughby was raised and attended high school in the town of Gustine in San Joaquin Valley. While attending Gustine High School, he played four years of varsity baseball as well as basketball and football, eventually participating in track events. He then was selected by the Giants in the 11th round of the 1967 MLB draft, being assigned immediately to the rookie class Salt Lake City Giants. Willoughby later pitched for other teams in the Giants minor league system, as well as pursuing a degree in electrical engineering as part of his scholarship plan signed with San Francisco. As a result, he spent the 1967–1968 offseason at UC Berkeley and also attended Fresno State, Phoenix College, and the College of San Mateo.

== Career ==
=== San Francisco Giants ===
Willoughby debuted with the Giants in their 1971 season during a game against the Houston Astros on September 9. He started the game and lasted only three innings, allowing three runs on six hits and one walk with three strikeouts, being credited with the loss. He finished the year with one inning of relief.

Back to the minors in 1972, Willoughby was recalled on August 3 to replace injured starter Sam McDowell. Three days later, Willoughby avenged on the Astros for the loss in his debut the year before by earning his first career win against them with a 6–2, complete game victory at Candlestick Park. He finished the season with a 6-4 record and a 2.36 ERA in 11 starts, striking out 40 and walking 14 in 87 2/3 innings while completing seven games. He then was used as long reliever and spot starter in 1973, and went 4-5 with a 4.68 ERA in 39 games. Furthermore, he accomplished his only career shutout against the St. Louis Cardinals on April 28, limiting them to four hits and one walk, while striking out six in the 1–0 victory.

Following a subpar season in 1974, Willoughby was traded to the Cardinals in exchange for second baseman Tom Heintzelman. Then St. Louis sent him to the Boston Red Sox in July 1975 to complete an earlier deal made for shortstop Mario Guerrero.

=== Boston Red Sox ===
By 1975, Boston was on the way to its first pennant since the 1967 "Impossible Dream" season, and Willoughby helped the team win the title when the bullpen was short handed and plagued by injuries of late.

Willoughby had never been a full-time reliever before, but he responded with a very solid season, as he made 24 appearances and went 5-2 with eight saves and a 3.54 ERA in 48 1/3 innings of work, but was not used in the 1975 ALCS against the three-time defending World Champion Oakland Athletics, which was swept by Boston in three games. Nevertheless, he assumed relief duties in three crucial games of the 1975 World Series against the Cincinnati Reds.

In Game 3 of the Series, Willoughby relieved in the bottom of the seventh inning with the score tied at 5–5 and retired nine consecutive hitters. He returned in the bottom of the tenth inning, only to set the stage for a wild and controversial finish.

Willoughby gave off a leadoff single to César Gerónimo. After that, Ed Armbrister attempted a sacrifice bunt that bounced high near the plate toward the first-base line. And Armbrister hesitated before running, apparently thinking the ball would go foul, while Boston catcher Carlton Fisk appeared to collide with him as he was retrieving the ball. In a controversial decision, the umpiring crew did not call Armbrister out for interference. Amid the confusion, Fisk attempted to force out Gerónimo, but his throw sailed high over shortstop Rick Burleson. This allowed Gerónimo to advance to third and Armbrister to advance to second. Both Fisk and Red Sox manager Darrell Johnson argued that Armbrister should have been ruled out for interference, but home plate umpire Larry Barnett ruled otherwise. Johnson then brought in Roger Moret, and elected to load the bases with an intentionally walk to Pete Rose and set up a force play situation. And that move failed. Moret struck out pinch hitter Merv Rettenmund, but Joe Morgan drove in Gerónimo with the winning run by hitting a deep sacrifice fly to center field, while Willoughby was tagged with the loss.

In his next Series appearances, Willoughby hurled two scoreless innings in Game 5 and was called on to calm things down in decisive Game 7. The score was tied, 3–3, in the top of the seventh inning, and Johnny Bench stepped to the plate with the bases loaded and two outs. Willoughby took care of the situation and easily retired Bench on a foul pop to catcher Fisk. He then pitched a clean 1-2-3 eighth inning. In the bottom of the eight, though, with two outs, none on base, and the score still tied, manager Johnson pulled Willoughby in favor of pinch-hitter Cecil Cooper. Cooper was retired on a pop out to third baseman Rose in foul territory. Afterwards, rookie left-handed Jim Burton came on to pitch the top half of the ninth for the Red Sox. Burton was selected by Johnson because the Reds were expected to send up three left-handed hitters in a row. But the strategy did not work, because Burton gave up two walks sandwiched around two outs and surrendered a single to Morgan, allowing Ken Griffey to score the go-ahead and eventual winning run of the Series. Overall, Willoughby allowed an unearned run, three singles and one walk, while striking out three in 6 1/3 innings.

In 1976, Willoughby posted an unfortunate record of 3-12 in 54 relief appearances, but he pitched well enough to post a 2.86 ERA in 99 innings while saving 10 games. But his role with the 1977 Red Sox team was reduced, as he spent time on the disabled list for the first time in his major league career. On May 22, Willoughby broke his right ankle when he slipped on the grass during a pregame warm up. He returned in the month of August, but was ineffective for the rest of the season, ending with a 6-2 record and two saves in 31 games. Moreover, he recorded an ERA of 4.94, his highest ever in a regular season.

=== Chicago White Sox ===
The Red Sox sold Willoughby to the Chicago White Sox at the end of the 1978 spring training. At Chicago, he was used exclusively as a middle reliever and setup man for closer Lerrin LaGrow. Willoughby pitched 59 games, going 1-6 with a 3.86 ERA and 13 saves in 93⅓ innings, during what turned out to be his final Major League season.

In October 1978, Chicago had sent Willoughby to the St. Louis Cardinals in exchange for outfielder John Scott. But Willoughby was released during the 1979 spring training, and he decided to sign a Double-A contract to play with the Wichita Aeros in the Chicago Cubs system. His contract allowed him to request his release if he was not called up to Chicago by the trade deadline. Then, when the Cubs declined to promote him, he made a deal with the Pittsburgh Pirates and joined the Triple–A Portland Beavers. Finally, he was included on the active roster of the eventual World Series champion Pirates as bullpen insurance but never appeared in a game. Nevertheless, he received a $250 World Series share from the 'We Are Family' Bucs that defeated the Baltimore Orioles in seven games.

=== Winterball ===
In between, Willoughby played in the winter for the Tigres de Aragua and Tiburones de La Guaira clubs of the Venezuelan League in the 1973–74 and 1979-80 seasons, respectively. In 1979, Willoughby played the entire minor league season with undiagnosed diabetes mellitus type 1, but was unaware of it until he went to Venezuela late in the year and suffered a diabetic coma. It was neither lengthy nor deep, but he was briefly in the hospital. At this point, he decided to retire for good from playing.

== After baseball ==
Following his playing retirement, Willoughby moved to Massachusetts and briefly hosted a radio talk show in Waltham. He then was named baseball head coach at Suffolk University in December 1980, but resigned four months later after being suspended for a bat-throwing incident during practice. Subsequently, he returned to his native California, where he worked as a construction contractor and developed a career building houses on the western slope of the Sierra Nevada.

== Returning to baseball ==
In 1989, Willoughby was working as a carpenter in California and received an invitation to play in the recent founded Senior Professional Baseball Association, where he joined the Winter Haven Super Sox pitching staff. Apparently, the team's owners wanted to put the old Red Sox team on the field. There, he also had a chance to reunite with some of his former 1970s teammates, who, like Willoughby, were dubbed the 'Buffalo Heads' for their counterculture behavior while playing at Boston. Consequently, Bill Lee pitched and managed the Super Sox, Ferguson Jenkins served as their pitching coach, Bill Campbell and Rick Wise pitched, Butch Hobson was the regular third baseman, and Bernie Carbo contributed as a part-time DH and pinch-hitter. Willoughby spent one more season in the league while pitching for the San Bernardino Pride in 1990, completing a professional baseball career for 15 years spanning four different decades from 1967–1990.

== Personal life ==
Married three times, Willoughby had two sons by his second wife: Trevor, who played baseball at Cal State Fullerton, and Ryan, who played basketball in high school.

Willoughby later became a resident of Pollock Pines in California, where he continued working as a painting and decorating contractor.

== Pitching statistics ==
Years	League	W	L	W-L%	ERA	GP	GS	CG	SHO	SV	IP	HA	RA	ER	SO	BB	IBB
1971–1978	MLB	26	36	4.19	3.79	238	28	8	1	34	550 2/3	558	266	232	250	145	29
1975	WS	0	1	.000	.000	3	0	0	0	0	6 1/3	3	1	0	2	0	0
1967–1972; 1974–1975; 1979	MiLB	73	55	.570	3.79	217	151	52	12	12	1153	1164	587	478	806	344	27
