= Major League Baseball on television in the 1970s =

By 1969, Major League Baseball had grown to 24 teams and the net local TV revenues had leaped to $20.7 million. This is in sharp contrast to 1950 when local television brought the then 16 Major League clubs a total net income of $2.3 million. Changes baseball underwent during this time, such as expansion franchises and increasing the schedule from 154 games to 162, led to a wider audience for network and local television.

From 1972 to 1975 NBC televised Monday games under a contract worth $72 million. In 1973, NBC extended the Monday night telecasts (with a local blackout) to 15 straight. On September 1, 1975, NBC's last Monday Night Baseball game, in which the Montreal Expos beat the host Philadelphia Phillies 6–5.

In the aftermath of the thrilling 1975 World Series, attendance figures, television contracts (this time including two networks, NBC and now ABC), and player salaries all soared. In the eyes of some, that particular World Series restored baseball as America's national pastime (ahead of football).

== Year-by-year breakdown ==
=== 1970 ===
In 1970, NBC televised the second games of both League Championship Series on a regional basis. Some markets received the NLCS at 1:00 pm. Eastern Time along with a 4:00 p.m. football game, while other markets got the ALCS at 4:00 p.m. along with a 1:00 p.m. football game.

=== 1971 ===
In 1971, Sandy Koufax signed a ten-year contract with NBC for $1 million to serve as a broadcaster on the Saturday Game of the Week. Koufax never felt comfortable being in front of the camera, and quit before the 1973 season.

Also in 1971, Game 1 of the ALCS was rained out on Saturday, October 2. NBC did not televise the rescheduled Game 1 the following day (the network had only planned an NLCS telecast that day), but added a telecast of Game 2 on Monday, October 4 (which had been a scheduled travel day).

On October 13, 1971, the World Series held a night game for the very first time. Commissioner Bowie Kuhn, who felt that baseball could attract a larger audience by featuring a prime time telecast (as opposed to a mid-afternoon broadcast, occurring when most fans either worked or attended school), pitched the idea to NBC. An estimated 61 million people watched Game 4 on NBC; television ratings for a World Series game during the daytime hours would not have approached such a record number.

=== 1972 ===
In 1972, NBC began televising prime time regular-season games on Mondays, under a four-year contract worth $72 million.

In the early years of the League Championship Series, NBC typically televised a doubleheader on Saturday, a single game on Sunday (because of football coverage). At the time, the network covered the weekday games with a 1 1/2-hour overlap, joining the second game in progress when the first one ended (unless a rain delay caused the second game to start after the first game ended, as was the case during the 1972 NLCS, when the Pirates-Reds Game 5 was delayed long enough that by the time that the A's-Tigers ALCS Game 4 was over, NBC could join the game in time for the first pitch.). NBC usually swapped announcer crews after Game 2.

NBC did not air Game 2 of the 1972 NLCS or the 1974 NLCS.

=== 1973 ===
In 1973, NBC extended the Monday night telecasts (with a local blackout) to 15 consecutive games.

=== 1974 ===
During NBC's telecast of the Monday night Dodgers–Braves game on April 8, 1974, in which Hank Aaron hit his record-breaking 715th career home run, Kubek criticized Commissioner Bowie Kuhn on-air for failing to be in attendance at Fulton County Stadium in Atlanta on that historic night; Kuhn argued that he had a prior engagement that he could not break.

=== 1975 ===
Starting in 1975, Joe Garagiola and Curt Gowdy alternated as the Saturday Game of Week play-by-play announcers with Tony Kubek doing color analysis. Then on weeks in which NBC had Monday Night Baseball, Gowdy and Garagiola worked together. One would call play-by-play for 4 1/2 innings, the other would handle color analysis. Then in the bottom of the 5th inning, their roles switched. Ultimately, in November 1975, Chrysler forced NBC to totally remove Curt Gowdy from NBC's top baseball team. Instead, the company wanted their spokesman, Joe Garagiola, to call all "A" regular season games, All-Star Games (when NBC had them), the top League Championship Series (when NBC had it), and the World Series (when NBC had it).

NBC hoped that, in replacing Curt Gowdy, Garagiola's charm and unorthodox dwelling on the personal would stop the decade-long ratings dive for the Game of the Week. Instead, the ratings bobbed from 6.7 (1977) via 7.5 (1978) to 6.3 (1981–82). "Saturday had a constituency, but it didn't swell" said NBC Sports executive producer Scotty Connal. Some believed that millions missed Dizzy Dean while local-team television broadcasters split the audience. Scotty Connal believed that the team of Joe Garagiola and Tony Kubek were "A great example of black and white". Connal added by saying "A pitcher throws badly to third, Joe says, 'The third baseman's fault.' Tony: 'The pitcher's'." Media critic Gary Deeb termed theirs "the finest baseball commentary ever carried on network TV."

Another factor behind Gowdy's dismissal was the criticism from the national media which alleged that he sided with the Boston Red Sox (a franchise that he had covered prior to his days at NBC) on a controversial play in the 10th inning of Game 3 of the 1975 World Series. Cincinnati Reds pitcher Ed Armbrister reached base on what was ruled an error by Red Sox catcher Carlton Fisk on Armbrister's bunt attempt. Gowdy said numerous times that, in his opinion, Armbrister had interfered with Fisk. Gowdy had been given the correct interpretation by NBC Radio Producer Jay Scott (who was a Triple-A fill-in umpire at the time as well), but did not use it. Umpire Larry Barnett claimed he had received death threats on account of Gowdy's criticism. More to the point, Tony Kubek, on the NBC telecast, immediately charged that Armbrister interfered (with the attempted forceout), even though home plate umpire Barnett did not agree. Later, Kubek got 1,000 letters dubbing him a Boston stooge. Prior to Game 2 of the 1986 World Series, NBC did a feature on replays narrated by Bob Costas. One of the plays cited by Costas was the Armbrister play, and Barnett and Costas both insisted that Barnett had made the correct call, although Barnett declared, "You won't find many people in Boston who believe it was the right call." Costas used the feature to condemn the suggested notion of instant replay to settle calls, noting that it was the "same kind of mentality that adds color to classic movies and calls it progress."

While Gowdy was on hand in the press box for Carlton Fisk's legendary home run in Game 6 of the 1975 World Series, the actual calls went to two of Gowdy's Red Sox successors, Dick Stockton on television and Ned Martin on radio. Gowdy was Martin's color commentator on that home run. Meanwhile, according to the NBC cameraman Lou Gerard located above the third base stands, cameramen at the time were instructed to follow the flight of the ball. Instead Gerard was distracted by a rat nearby, thus he lost track of the baseball and instead decided to capture the image of Fisk "magically" waving the ball fair.

NBC's last Monday Night Baseball game aired on September 1, 1975, in which the Montreal Expos beat the Philadelphia Phillies, 6–5. Curt Gowdy called the games with Tony Kubek from 1972 to 1974, being joined in the 1973 and 1974 seasons by various guest commentators from both within and outside of the baseball world (among them Dizzy Dean, Joe DiMaggio, Satchel Paige, Bobby Riggs, Dave DeBusschere, Howard Cosell, Mel Allen, Danny Kaye and Willie Mays). Jim Simpson and Maury Wills called the secondary backup games. Joe Garagiola hosted the pre-game show, The Baseball World of Joe Garagiola, and teamed with Gowdy to call the games in 1975.

Except for Game 1 in both League Championship Series, all games in 1975 were regionally televised. Game 3 of both League Championship Series were aired in prime time, the first time such an occurrence happened.

=== 1976 ===
Under the initial agreement with ABC, NBC and Major League Baseball (running through the 1976 to 1979 seasons), both networks paid $92.8 million for the league broadcast rights. ABC paid $12.5 million per year to show 16 Monday night games in 1976, 18 in the next three years, plus half the postseason (the League Championship Series in even-numbered years and World Series in odd-numbered years). NBC paid $10.7 million per year to show 25 Saturday Games of the Week and the other half of the postseason (the League Championship Series in odd-numbered years and World Series in even-numbered years).

Major League Baseball media director John Lazarus said of the new arrangement between NBC and ABC "Ratings couldn't get more from one network so we approached another." NBC's Joe Garagiola was not very fond of the new broadcasting arrangement at first saying "I wished they hadn't got half the package. Still, 'Game', half of the postseason – we got lots left." By 1980, income from television broadcasts accounted for a record 30% of the game's $500 million in revenues.

In 1976, ABC picked up the television rights for Monday Night Baseball games from NBC. For most of its time on ABC, the Monday night games were held on "dead travel days" when few games were scheduled. The team owners liked that arrangement as the national telecasts didn't compete against their stadium box offices. ABC on the other hand, found the arrangement far more complicated. ABC often had only one or two games to pick from for each telecast from a schedule designed by Major League Baseball. While trying to give all of the teams national exposure, ABC ended up with far too many games between sub .500 clubs from small markets. Reviewing the network's first two weeks of coverage for Sports Illustrated, William Leggett opined: "It may be unfair to say that Monday Night Baseball, as it has been presented by ABC so far this season, is the worst television treatment ever given a major sport, because by all odds somebody at sometime must have done something worse. But it is difficult to remember when or where that might have happened."

Just like with Monday Night Football, ABC brought in the concept of the three-man-booth (originally with Bob Prince, Bob Uecker, and Warner Wolf as the primary crew) to their baseball telecasts. Said ABC Sports head Roone Arledge "It'll take something different for it to work - i.e. curb viewership yawns and lulls with Uecker as the real difference", so Arledge reportedly hoped. Prince disclosed to his broadcasting partner Jim Woods about his early worries about calling a network series for the first time. Prince for one, didn't have as much creative control over the broadcasts on ABC as he did calling Pittsburgh Pirates games on KDKA radio. On the June 7, 1976 edition of Monday Night Baseball, Prince returned to Three Rivers Stadium, from which he had been exiled for over a year. Although Prince received a warm reception, he was confused when the next day the Pittsburgh Post-Gazette read: "Ratings are low, negative reviews rampant."

June 28, 1976, the Detroit Tigers faced the New York Yankees on Monday Night Baseball, with 47,855 attending at Tiger Stadium and a national television audience, Tigers pitcher Mark "The Bird" Fidrych talked to the ball and groomed the mound, as the Tigers won, 5–1 in a game that lasted only 1 hour and 51 minutes. After the game, the crowd would not leave the park until Fidrych came out of the dugout to tip his cap.

For ABC's coverage of the 1976 All-Star Game, the team of Bob Prince, Bob Uecker and Warner Wolf alternated roles for the broadcast. For the first three innings, Prince did play-by-play with Wolf on color commentary and Uecker doing field interviews. For the middle innings, Uecker worked play-by-play with Prince on color and Wolf doing the interviews. For the final three innings, Wolf worked play-by-play with Uecker on color and Prince doing interviews.

Bob Prince was gone by the fall of 1976, with Keith Jackson, Howard Cosell, and guest analyst Reggie Jackson calling that year's American League Championship Series. (Warner Wolf, Al Michaels and guest analyst Tom Seaver worked the NLCS.) On the subject of his dismissal from ABC, Bob Prince said "I hated Houston, and ABC never let me be Bob Prince." MLB commissioner Bowie Kuhn strongly objected to ABC's recruitment of Howard Cosell because of comments by Cosell in recent years about how dull baseball had become. But Roone Arledge held the trump card as the contract he had signed with Major League Baseball gave ABC the final say over announcers. So Cosell worked the 1976 ALCS and became a regular member of Monday Night Baseball the next season.

Keith Jackson was unavailable to call Game 1 of the 1976 ALCS because he had just gotten finished calling an Oklahoma-Texas college football game for ABC. Thus, Bob Uecker filled-in for Jackson for Game 1. Uecker also took part in the postgame interviews for Game 5 of the 1976 ALCS, while Warner Wolf did an interview of George Brett in the Kansas City locker room.

=== 1977 ===
On June 18, 1977, in the New York Yankees' 10–4 loss to the Boston Red Sox in a nationally televised game at Fenway Park in Boston, Jim Rice, a powerful hitter but a slow runner, hit a ball into right field that Reggie Jackson seemed to get to without much speed, and Rice reached second base. Furious, Yankees manager Billy Martin removed Jackson from the game without even waiting for the end of the inning, sending Paul Blair out to replace him. When Jackson arrived at the dugout, Martin yelled that Jackson had shown him up. The two men argued, and Jackson said that Martin's heavy drinking had impaired his judgment. Despite Jackson being eighteen years younger, about two inches taller and maybe 40 pounds heavier, Martin lunged at him, and had to be restrained by coaches Yogi Berra and Elston Howard. Red Sox fans could see this in the dugout and began cheering wildly; NBC television cameras showed the confrontation to the entire country.

Still on the disabled list toward the end of the 1977 season, Mark Fidrych worked as a guest color analyst on a Monday Night Baseball telecast for ABC; he was subsequently criticized for his lack of preparation, as when play-by-play partner Al Michaels tried talking with him about Philadelphia Phillies player Richie Hebner and Fidrych responded, "Who's Richie Hebner?" As an American League player, Fidrych had never had to face Hebner, who played in the National League.

The 1977 World Series marked the first time that the participating teams' local announcers were not featured as booth announcers on the network telecast of a World Series. 1977 was also the first year in which one announcer (in this case, ABC's Keith Jackson) provided all of the play-by-play for a World Series telecast. In previous years, the play-by-play announcers and color commentators had alternated roles during each game. Meanwhile, Yankees announcer Bill White and Dodgers announcer Ross Porter alternated between pregame/postgame duties on ABC and calling the games for CBS Radio. White worked the ABC telecasts for the games in New York (including the clubhouse trophy presentation ceremony after Game 6) while Porter did likewise for the games in Los Angeles.

=== 1978 ===
In 1978, Baseball Hall of Famer Don Drysdale joined ABC Sports with assignments such as Monday Night Baseball, Superstars, and Wide World of Sports. In 1979, Drysdale covered the World Series Trophy presentation. According to Drysdale "My thing is to talk about inside things. Keith [Jackson] does play-by-play. Howard's [Cosell] role is anything since anything can happen in broadcasting." When ABC released and then rehired him in 1981, Drysdale explained it by saying "If there is nothing to say, be quiet." Ultimately, Drysdale seemed to be slowly phased out of the ABC picture as fellow Hall of Fame pitcher Jim Palmer was considered ABC's new poster child "[of] superior looks and...popularity from underwear commercials." By 1989, Palmer would earn $350,000 from ABC for appearing on around ten regular season broadcasts and making a few postseason appearances.

For a national television audience, the 1978 American League East tie-breaker game (New York Yankees/Boston Red Sox) aired on ABC with Keith Jackson and Don Drysdale on the call. Meanwhile, the game aired locally in New York City on WPIX and on WSBK in Boston. Phil Rizzuto, Frank Messer and Bill White called the game on WPIX while Dick Stockton and Ken Harrelson called the game on WSBK. Also in 1978, Keith Jackson called an Oklahoma-Texas college football game for ABC and then, flew to New York, arriving just in time to call Game 4 of the ALCS that same night (October 7).

=== 1979 ===
In 1979, 22 teams (all but the Atlanta Braves, Houston Astros, New York Mets, and St. Louis Cardinals) participated in a one-year cable deal with United Artists Television and Columbia Pictures Television, then-owners of the USA Network. The deal involved the airing of a Thursday night Game of the Week in markets at least 50 miles (80 km) from a major league park. The deal earned Major League Baseball less than $500,000, but led to a new two-year contract for 40–45 games per season. The program ran through the 1983 season.

With USA's Thursday night coverage, it ended ABC's Monday night broadcast's position as the exclusive national, prime time television franchise for Major League Baseball.

The start of ABC's Monday Night Baseball coverage was moved back to June, due to poor ratings during the May sweeps period. In place of April and May prime time games, ABC began airing Sunday Afternoon Baseball games in September. The network also aired one Friday night game (Yankees at Angels) on July 13 of that year. On August 6, 1979 the entire Yankee team attended team captain/catcher Thurman Munson's funeral in Canton, Ohio. Teammates Lou Piniella and Bobby Murcer, who were Munson's best friends, gave eulogies. That night (before a national viewing audience on ABC's Monday Night Baseball) the Yankees beat the Baltimore Orioles 5–4 in New York, with Murcer driving in all five runs with a three-run home run in the seventh inning and a two-run single in the bottom of the ninth.
