= 1973 Major League Baseball All-Star Game =

1973 American baseball competition

	1	2	3	4	5	6	7	8	9	R	H	E
National League	0	0	2	1	2	2	0	0	0	7	10	0
American League	0	1	0	0	0	0	0	0	0	1	5	0
- Date: July 24, 1973
- Venue: Royals Stadium
- City: Kansas City, Missouri
- Managers: Sparky Anderson (CIN); Dick Williams (OAK)
- MVP: Bobby Bonds (SF)
- Attendance: 40,849
- Ceremonial first pitch: Lefty Gomez, Bill Hallahan and Ewing Kauffman
- Television: NBC
- TV announcers: Curt Gowdy and Tony Kubek
- Radio: NBC
- Radio announcers: Jim Simpson and Maury Wills

The 1973 Major League Baseball All-Star Game was the 44th midseason exhibition between the all-stars of the American League (AL) and the National League (NL), the two leagues comprising Major League Baseball. The game was played on July 24, 1973, at Royals Stadium in Kansas City, Missouri, home of the Kansas City Royals of the American League. The game resulted in a 7–1 victory for the NL.

Royals Stadium had not even been open for four months when it hosted this, its first All-Star Game. The game had been hosted in Kansas City once before (1960) when the Kansas City Athletics had been the host team at Kansas City's Municipal Stadium. After this game was played, the Royals did not host another All-Star Game until they were awarded the 2012 All-Star Game.

Arrowhead Stadium, which shares the same parking lot as part of the Harry S. Truman Sports Complex, hosted the 1974 Pro Bowl about six months after this game.

This game marked the 40th anniversary year of the first All-Star Game in 1933. As a part of that recognition, some of the surviving stars from that first game, including Dick Bartell, Joe Cronin, Jimmie Dykes, Charlie Gehringer, Lefty Gomez, Lefty Grove, Bill Hallahan, and Carl Hubbell were in attendance.

== National League roster ==
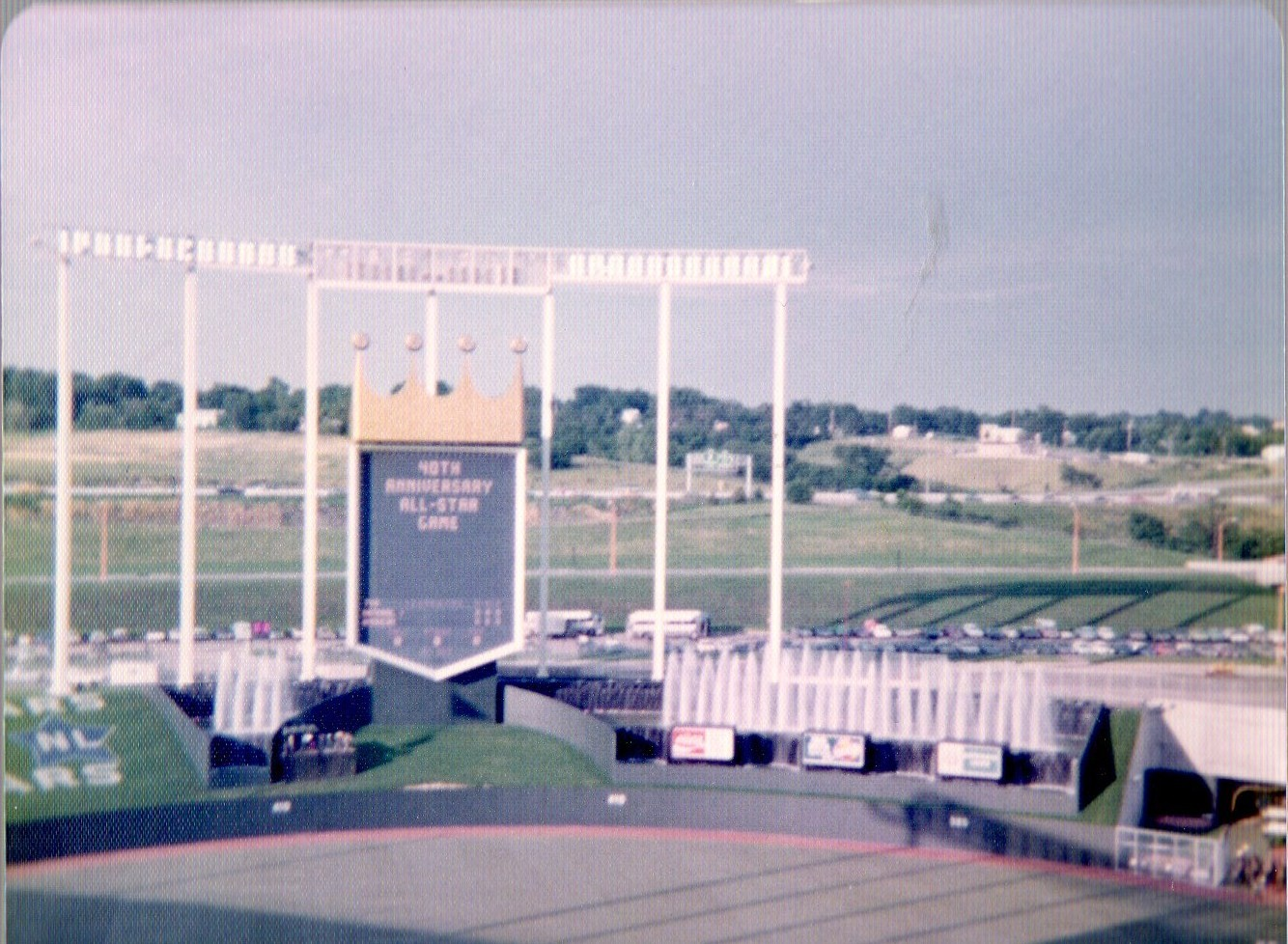
View of Royals Stadium during the All-Star Game

The National League roster included 11 future Hall of Fame players and coaches, denoted in italics.

=== Elected starters ===
Position	Player	Team	Notes
C	Johnny Bench	Cincinnati Reds
1B	Hank Aaron	Atlanta Braves
2B	Joe Morgan	Cincinnati Reds
3B	Ron Santo	Chicago Cubs
SS	Chris Speier	San Francisco Giants
OF	César Cedeño	Houston Astros
OF	Pete Rose	Cincinnati Reds
OF	Billy Williams	Chicago Cubs

=== Pitchers ===
Throws	Pitcher	Team	Notes
RH	Jack Billingham	Cincinnati Reds	did not pitch
LH	Jim Brewer	Los Angeles Dodgers
RH	Dave Giusti	Pittsburgh Pirates
LH	Claude Osteen	Los Angeles Dodgers
RH	Tom Seaver	New York Mets
RH	Don Sutton	Los Angeles Dodgers
RH	Wayne Twitchell	Philadelphia Phillies
RH	Rick Wise	St. Louis Cardinals	starting pitcher

=== Reserve position players ===
Position	Player	Team	Notes
C	Ted Simmons	St. Louis Cardinals
1B	Nate Colbert	San Diego Padres
1B	Ron Fairly	Montreal Expos
2B	Davey Johnson	Atlanta Braves
3B	Darrell Evans	Atlanta Braves
3B	Joe Torre	St. Louis Cardinals
SS	Dave Concepción	Cincinnati Reds	injured
SS	Bill Russell	Los Angeles Dodgers
OF	Bobby Bonds	San Francisco Giants
OF	Willie Davis	Los Angeles Dodgers
OF	Willie Mays	New York Mets
OF	Manny Mota	Los Angeles Dodgers
OF	Willie Stargell	Pittsburgh Pirates
OF	Bob Watson	Houston Astros

=== Coaching staff ===
Position	Manager	Team
Manager	Sparky Anderson	Cincinnati Reds
Coach	Gene Mauch	Montreal Expos
Coach	Bill Virdon	Pittsburgh Pirates

== American League roster ==
The American League roster included 12 future Hall of Fame players and coaches, denoted in italics.

=== Elected starters ===
Position	Player	Team	Notes
C	Carlton Fisk	Boston Red Sox
1B	Dick Allen	Chicago White Sox	injured
2B	Rod Carew	Minnesota Twins
3B	Brooks Robinson	Baltimore Orioles
SS	Bert Campaneris	Oakland Athletics
OF	Reggie Jackson	Oakland Athletics
OF	Bobby Murcer	New York Yankees
OF	Amos Otis	Kansas City Royals

=== Pitchers ===
Throws	Pitcher	Team	Notes
RH	Bert Blyleven	Minnesota Twins
RH	Jim Colborn	Milwaukee Brewers	did not pitch
RH	Rollie Fingers	Oakland Athletics
LH	Ken Holtzman	Oakland Athletics
RH	Catfish Hunter	Oakland Athletics	starting pitcher
LH	Bill Lee	Boston Red Sox	did not pitch
LH	Sparky Lyle	New York Yankees
RH	Nolan Ryan	California Angels
RH	Bill Singer	California Angels

=== Reserve position players ===
Position	Player	Team	Notes
C	Bill Freehan	Detroit Tigers	did not play
C	Thurman Munson	New York Yankees
1B	John Mayberry	Kansas City Royals	started for Allen
1B	Jim Spencer	Texas Rangers
1B	Carl Yastrzemski	Boston Red Sox	injured
2B	Dave Nelson	Texas Rangers
2B	Cookie Rojas	Kansas City Royals
3B	Sal Bando	Oakland Athletics
3B	Buddy Bell	Cleveland Indians
SS	Ed Brinkman	Detroit Tigers
OF	Paul Blair	Baltimore Orioles
OF	Willie Horton	Detroit Tigers
OF	Pat Kelly	Chicago White Sox
OF	Dave May	Milwaukee Brewers

=== Coaching staff ===
Position	Manager	Team
Manager	Dick Williams	Oakland Athletics
Coach	Whitey Herzog	Texas Rangers
Coach	Chuck Tanner	Chicago White Sox

== Starting lineups ==
While the starters were elected by the fans, the batting orders and starting pitchers were selected by the managers.

National League				American League			
Order	Player	Team	Position	Order	Player	Team	Position
1	Pete Rose	Cincinnati Reds	LF	1	Bert Campaneris	Oakland Athletics	SS
2	Joe Morgan	Cincinnati Reds	2B	2	Rod Carew	Minnesota Twins	2B
3	César Cedeño	Houston Astros	CF	3	John Mayberry	Kansas City Royals	1B
4	Hank Aaron	Atlanta Braves	1B	4	Reggie Jackson	Oakland Athletics	RF
5	Billy Williams	Chicago Cubs	RF	5	Amos Otis	Kansas City Royals	CF
6	Johnny Bench	Cincinnati Reds	C	6	Bobby Murcer	New York Yankees	LF
7	Ron Santo	Chicago Cubs	3B	7	Carlton Fisk	Boston Red Sox	C
8	Chris Speier	San Francisco Giants	SS	8	Brooks Robinson	Baltimore Orioles	3B
9	Rick Wise	St. Louis Cardinals	P	9	Catfish Hunter	Oakland Athletics	P

== Umpires ==
Position	Umpire
Home Plate	Nestor Chylak(AL)
First Base	Ken Burkhart(NL)
Second Base	Larry Barnett(AL)
Third Base	Bill Williams(NL)
Left Field	Ron Luciano(AL)
Right Field	Bob Engel (NL)

== Scoring summary ==
Scoring began in the bottom of the second inning, with Rick Wise in his second and final inning of pitching for the NL. Reggie Jackson led off with a double, and came home when the next batter, Amos Otis, singled. This would be the beginning and end of scoring for the American League.

The National League wasted no time coming back, taking advantage of new pitcher, Bert Blyleven, in the top of the third inning. Darrell Evans, pinch hitting for Rick Wise, walked, and was forced out at second base when Pete Rose hit into a fielder's choice. Joe Morgan walked. César Cedeño's single scored Rose, and sent Morgan to third base. Hank Aaron singled to Murcer who threw out Cedeño at third, but not before Morgan had scored to give the NL a 2–1 lead.

The NL added a single run in the top of the fourth inning, as Johnny Bench, the first hitter AL relief pitcher Bill Singer faced, hit a lead off home run.

In the top of the fifth inning, the NL scoring continued off of Bill Singer. Joe Morgan led off with a double. Three hitters later, with two outs, Bobby Bonds hit a two-run home run, bringing the score to 5–1.

In the top of the sixth inning, Nolan Ryan came in to pitch in relief, though the outcome was virtually identical to the previous inning. Ron Santo led off with a walk. Two batters later with one out, Willie Davis, pinch hitting for the pitcher, Don Sutton, hit a two-run home run to extend the NL lead to 7–1, and closing out scoring for the game.

=== Line score ===
Tuesday, July 24, 1973 7:30 pm (CT) at Royals Stadium in Kansas City, Missouri
Team	1	2	3	4	5	6	7	8	9	R	H	E
National League	0	0	2	1	2	2	0	0	0	7	10	0
American League	0	1	0	0	0	0	0	0	0	1	5	0
WP: Rick Wise (1-0) LP: Bert Blyleven (0-1) Sv: Jim Brewer (1); Home runs: NL: Johnny Bench (1), Bobby Bonds (1), Willie Davis (1); AL: None

== Game notes and records ==
Rick Wise was credited with the win. Bert Blyleven was credited with the loss. Jim Brewer was credited with the save.

This was the 24th and final All-Star Game appearance for Willie Mays. Mays appeared in every game from 1954 to 1973. Only Hank Aaron and Stan Musial have played in as many All-Star Games as Mays.

Jim Spencer became the first member of the Texas Rangers to appear in an All-Star Game. The Rangers were playing their second season in Arlington, Texas after moving from Washington, D.C., where they were the second incarnation of the Washington Senators from 1961 to 1971. Toby Harrah, Texas' lone representative in the 1972 game, was injured.

Catfish Hunter was removed from the game in the second inning after Billy Williams hit a line drive that hit Hunter's right hand, breaking his thumb. He missed two weeks of the regular season.

This All-Star Game saw 54 players (28 for the NL and 26 for the AL) enter the game. This became a new All-Star Game record for participating players.

Buddy Bell became the second son of a former All-Star (Gus Bell) to appear in an All-Star Game.

In total, there were 19 future hall of famers involved with the game. The non-players involved in the 1973 All-Star Game that have been inducted into the Baseball Hall of Fame are Sparky Anderson, Dick Williams, Whitey Herzog, and Nestor Chylak.

As of 2020, Royals Stadium is the last facility to host the MLB All-Star Game in its first season of operation. Cincinnati's Riverfront Stadium hosted the 1970 game 12 days after it opened, and St. Louis' Busch Memorial Stadium opened two months prior to the 1966 game. Pittsburgh's Three Rivers Stadium, which opened two weeks after Riverfront, hosted the 1974 game. Royals Stadium was scheduled to open for the 1972 season, but labor strife and bad weather caused long delays, forcing the Royals to spend 1972 at Municipal Stadium.
