= Dave Concepción =

Venezuelan baseball player (born 1948)

David Concepción
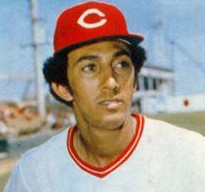
- Shortstop
- Born: June 17, 1948 (age 78); Ocumare de la Costa, Venezuela
- Batted: Right Threw: Right

MLB debut
- April 6, 1970, for the Cincinnati Reds

Last MLB appearance
- September 15, 1988, for the Cincinnati Reds

MLB statistics
- Batting average: .267
- Hits: 2,326
- Home runs: 101
- Runs batted in: 950
- Stats at Baseball Reference

Teams
- Cincinnati Reds (1970–1988)

Career highlights and awards
- 9× All-Star (1973, 1975–1982); 2× World Series champion (1975, 1976); 5× Gold Glove Award (1974–1977, 1979); 2× Silver Slugger Award (1981, 1982); Cincinnati Reds No. 13 retired; Cincinnati Reds Hall of Fame

David Ismael Concepción Benitez (born June 17, 1948) is a Venezuelan former professional baseball player and manager. He played his entire career in Major League Baseball as a shortstop for the Cincinnati Reds dynasty that won four National League pennants and two World Series championships between 1970 and 1976.

A nine-time All-Star player, Concepción earned five Gold Glove Awards as he teamed with Joe Morgan for one of the best middle-infield combinations of their era. He also won two Silver Slugger Awards and was named the MVP of the 1982 All-Star Game. In 2000, Concepción was inducted into the Cincinnati Reds Hall of Fame and in 2007, the team retired Concepción's uniform #13.

== Early life ==
Concepción was born in Ocumare de la Costa, Aragua State, Venezuela, the son of a truck driver and his wife, Ernestina. He attended Agustin Codazzi High School. After high school, he worked as a bank teller and played part-time for the local Tigres de Aragua baseball team. His coach, Wilfredo Calviño, was also a Cincinnati Reds' scout, and Calviño signed Concepción to a Reds' contract in 1967.

== Career ==
Following the steps of his childhood heroes Chico Carrasquel and Luis Aparicio, Jr., Concepción, originally drafted as a pitcher, came out of Venezuela to become one of the Reds' and the National League's greatest all-time shortstops. He made his big-league debut at the age of 21 on April 6, 1970, starting at shortstop and going 0-for-4 as the Reds defeated the Montreal Expos, 5–1. He went 0-for-4 again the next day against the Los Angeles Dodgers before getting his first hit on April 8, a seventh-inning double off Dodgers pitcher (and future Reds teammate) Fred Norman.

In his first three seasons, Reds manager Sparky Anderson played him part-time, sharing duties with Woody Woodward and Darrel Chaney. In one of those appearances, in 1971, he was the only team member to reach base safely when the Reds were no-hit by the Philadelphia Phillies' Rick Wise; a sixth-inning walk spoiled what would have been a perfect game. In 1973, Concepción blossomed, both at bat and in the field, being named the starting shortstop. On May 9, in a Reds 9–7 victory over the Philadelphia Phillies, Johnny Bench hit three home runs and drove in seven runs against pitcher Steve Carlton. It was the second time that Bench smashed three homers against Carlton in a game. However, a Concepción two-run tie-breaker homer in the ninth, off Barry Lersch, was the game-winner. Concepción had been named to the NL All-Star team, but on July 22, two days before the game he dislocated his knee and broke his leg (sliding into third base after moving from first base with Denis Menke base hit against the Expos in the bottom of the seventh inning at Riverfront, fracturing the fibula of left leg) and missed the second half of the year. At this time, he was batting .287, with 8 home runs, 46 RBI, 39 runs, 18 doubles, three triples and 22 stolen bases.

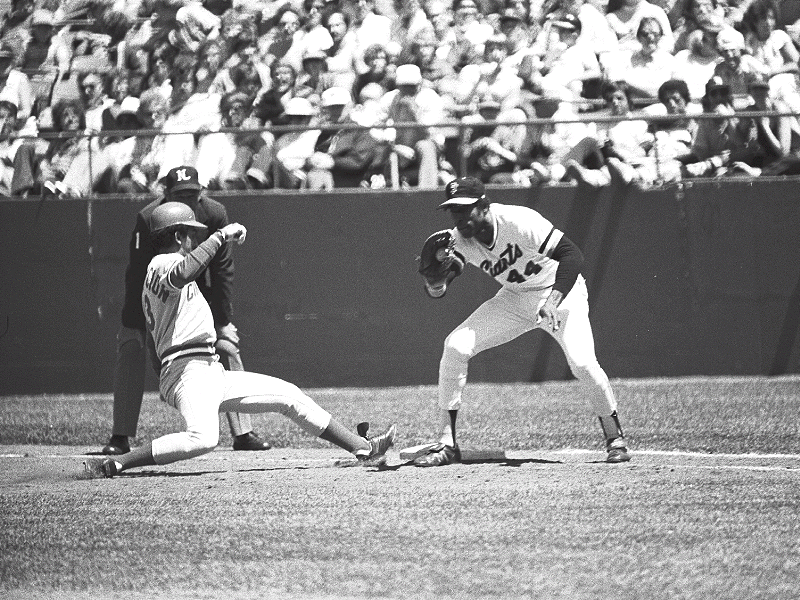
Willie McCovey attempts to tag out Concepción at first base in McCovey's final game at Candlestick Park, 1980

Concepción returned in 1974 and played 160 games. He enjoyed his best overall season, batting .281, with 14 home runs and 82 RBI, as well as winning his first of five Gold Glove Awards.

By 1975, Concepción joined Pete Rose, Johnny Bench, Joe Morgan, Tony Pérez, Ken Griffey, Sr., George Foster and César Gerónimo in the famous "Great Eight" starting lineup of The Big Red Machine that would help the Reds win the next two World Series titles. Even after Concepción had established himself in the major leagues as a star shortstop, he continued to play winter ball in Venezuela, helping to improve his batting. After his .274, 5, 49 totals in the 1975 Major League season, Concepción posted marks of: .281, 9, 69 (1976); .271, 8, 64 (1977); .301, 6, 67 (1978); .281, 16, 84 (1979); .260, 5, 77 (1980); .306, 5, 67 (1981); and .287, 5, 53 (1982).

On July 13, 1982, the first All-Star Game outside of the United States was held at Montreal's Olympic Stadium. Concepción hit a two-run homer to help the National League to a 4–1 win (the NL's 11th straight victory and 19th in the last 20 contests). Concepción was named the game's Most Valuable Player.

Later in his career, Concepción worked with Tony Pérez and perfected the one-bounce throw to first base. Concepción was the first shortstop to use this method to take advantage of the smooth artificial turf at Riverfront Stadium and other parks in the National League.

Hampered by age, an elbow injury and shoulder surgery in 1982, Concepción had consecutive sub-par seasons from 1983 to 1984. Grooming Barry Larkin as his successor, he became a dependable handyman at all four infield positions. He was replaced by Larkin in 1986, only 44 games away from Larry Bowa's NL record for shortstops.

In 1988, which would be his 19th and final season with the Reds, manager Pete Rose sent Concepción in to pitch 1.1 innings in Dodger Stadium late in a blow-out game. He gave up two hits, no runs, and struck out one batter. The Reds released Concepción after the 1988 season. He attempted a 20th Major League season in 1989, trying out for the California Angels, but he failed to make the roster and retired from playing at the age of 40.

Concepcion ranks second in Cincinnati Reds history in career games played and at-bats; third in hits, doubles and stolen bases; and fifth in runs scored and total bases. He and his successor at shortstop Barry Larkin share the franchise record with 19 seasons played in a Reds uniform.

== Personal life ==
After retiring in 1989, he served as manager of the Tigres de Aragua in the Venezuelan Professional Baseball League.

Concepción resides with his wife, Delia, in Urbanizacion El Castaño, a community in Maracay, Venezuela at the base of the mountains near Henri Pittier National Park. They have three grown children, sons David Alejandro and David Eduardo, and daughter Daneska. Concepción owns a farm as well as a trucking business.

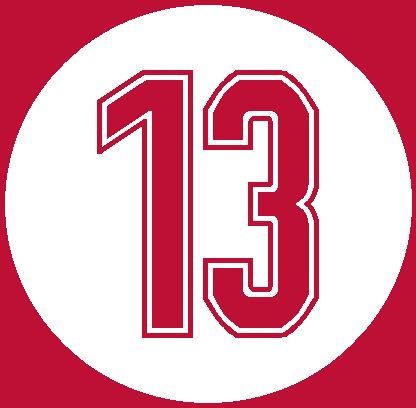
Dave Concepción's number 13 was retired by the Cincinnati Reds in 2007.

On August 25, 2007, the Cincinnati Reds held a pre-game ceremony to retire Concepción's number 13.

Joining him were several other all-time Reds greats whose numbers were retired, including former teammates Tony Pérez, Johnny Bench, Joe Morgan and manager Sparky Anderson as well as former teammates Ken Griffey and George Foster. Concepción has said that he originally chose that number to honor his mother, Ernestina, who was born in 1913. It was the first occasion in Major League history that the number 13 was retired by a team.

His number 13 was also retired by the Venezuelan team for which he played 20 years of winter ball, Tigres de Aragua of Maracay. In 2014, he was named vice president of the club. He is a member of the Caribbean Series Hall of Fame.

In 2014, Concepción returned to Cincinnati to serve as grand marshal of the annual opening day Findlay Market Parade, and later he and his successor at shortstop for the Reds, Barry Larkin, threw the ceremonial first pitches prior to the Reds' season opener.

== Articles ==
- Reds' Brass Excited Over Concepción, Fast-Rising Infield Whiz. The Sporting News, by Earl Lawson – November 8, 1969 (Vol. 168, Issue 17) -- p. 39
- The Making of Dave Concepción. Baseball Digest, by Si Burick – August, 1974 (Vol. 33, Issue 8) -- p. 40, 3 page(s)
- Friday the 13th. Sports Illustrated, by Robert H. Boyle – June 23, 1980 (Vol. 52, Issue 26) -- p. 13, 14
- Dave Concepción Best in the Business. Boys' Life, by Jim Brosnan – September, 1975 (Vol. 65, Issue 9) -- p. 20, 4 page(s)

== See also ==
- List of NL Gold Glove winners at shortstop
- List of Gold Glove middle infield duos
- List of Major League Baseball career hits leaders
- List of Major League Baseball career stolen bases leaders
- List of Major League Baseball players who spent their entire career with one franchise
- List of Major League Baseball players from Venezuela
- Tigres de Aragua

Preceded by Gary Carter	National League Player of the Month; April, 1981	Succeeded by Art Howe
