= Bernie Carbo =

American baseball player (born 1947)

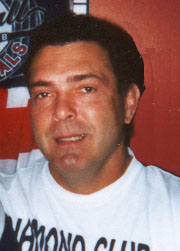
- Carbo in 1993
- Outfielder
- Born: August 5, 1947 (age 78); Detroit, Michigan, U.S.
- Batted: Left Threw: Right

MLB debut
- September 2, 1969, for the Cincinnati Reds

Last MLB appearance
- September 29, 1980, for the Pittsburgh Pirates

MLB statistics
- Batting average: .264
- Home runs: 96
- Runs batted in: 358
- Stats at Baseball Reference

Teams
- Cincinnati Reds (1969–1972); St. Louis Cardinals (1972–1973); Boston Red Sox (1974–1976); Milwaukee Brewers (1976); Boston Red Sox (1977–1978); Cleveland Indians (1978); St. Louis Cardinals (1979–1980); Pittsburgh Pirates (1980)

Bernardo Carbo (born August 5, 1947) is an American former professional baseball outfielder and designated hitter who played 12 seasons in Major League Baseball (MLB). He began his career with the Cincinnati Reds, and went on to play with five other teams, including two stints with the St. Louis Cardinals and Boston Red Sox.

== Early life ==
Carbo was raised in the Detroit suburb of Livonia and graduated in 1965 from Franklin High School, playing for the school's baseball team while there. He batted left-handed and threw right-handed.

== Career ==
An outfielder, Carbo was the Cincinnati Reds' first selection (16th overall) in the inaugural 1965 draft, ahead of Johnny Bench, and his first major league hit was a home run. In his 1970 rookie season, Carbo posted career highs in batting average (.310), home runs (21), runs batted in (63), hits (113), on-base percentage (.454), slugging average (.551), OPS (1.005) and games played (125). Carbo was selected Rookie of the Year by The Sporting News, but he slumped in the next two seasons and was sent to the St. Louis Cardinals.

=== Boston Red Sox ===
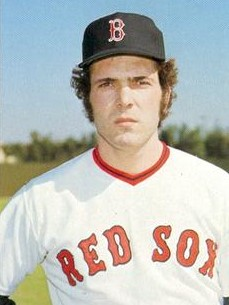
Carbo with the Boston Red Sox

After the 1973 season in late October, St. Louis traded Carbo and Rick Wise to the Boston Red Sox for Reggie Smith and Ken Tatum. He said of coming to Boston: "When I first met [Red Sox owner] Mr. Yawkey, he was shining shoes in the clubhouse," said Carbo, "and I went up to him and gave him $20 and told him to get me a cheeseburger and fries." While playing for the Red Sox, he was a part of the "Buffalo Heads", with Bill "Spaceman" Lee and Ferguson Jenkins. Carbo would also carry around a giant stuffed gorilla that was named Mighty Joe Young. The gorilla sat next to him in the middle seat on planes. Carl Yastrzemski wanted the gorilla placed on the bat rack in the dugout.

The 1975 World Series matched the Red Sox with the heavily favored Cincinnati Reds, who were looking for their first title since 1940. Boston had also suffered a drought by not winning a Series since 1918. The clubs battled back and forth, with the Reds winning three of the first five games. Carbo was excited to see some of his old teammates. Carbo would be on the bench, and his former teammates were sympathetic. Clay Carroll inscribed a picture for him and it read "Good luck in the World Series." After Game 3, when Carbo hit a home run off him, Carbo said, "They told me Carroll was in here and just went crazy, ripping up the picture into little pieces."

Game 6 was postponed three days because of rain. Carbo did not join his teammates for batting practice at Tufts University because he said he couldn't find it. He spent the early part of Game 6 working on his Louisville Slugger. "I’m sitting there and I’m whittling this bat, I took a lathe and took all the polish off. It's nice and smooth. Rick Wise is sitting next to me and says, ‘You know, you can’t use that bat. It doesn’t have an emblem on it.’ So as the game was going I took a magic marker and wrote ‘Louisville Slugger’ on it. That's how I kept myself amused."

In Game 6 (October 21), with two outs and two batters on base in the eighth inning, Roger Moret was scheduled to bat. Darrell Johnson told Carbo to get ready.

And I said, "Hey, I'm not going to hit. Juan Beníquez, grab a bat, you're going to hit. Sparky's going to go to the lefthander because Sparky goes by the book." Darrell said, "Well, go up and stand on the on-deck circle." And they introduced me. So I'm still thinking Sparky will come out and take Rawly Eastwick out and go with Will McEnaney. But the umpire says, "C'mon, you’ve been announced, you’re hitting."

So I go into the batter's box. I ain’t ready to hit. Next thing, strike one, strike two, ball one, ball two. Then he threw me a cut fastball, a little slider and I took it right out of Bench's glove — the ball just dribbled out. I step out and I’m thinking, "Aw man, I almost struck out. I was lucky."

I hit the next pitch to center field. I rounded first base and I saw César Gerónimo going back. Rounding second, I knew it was gone and I'm yelling to Pete Rose, "Don't you wish you were this strong?" And Pete is yelling back, "Ain't this fun, Bernie? This is what the World Series is about. This is fun."

Johnny Bench said after the game it looked like a Little Leaguer learning how to hit. Pete Rose said it was the worst swing he ever saw. Don Zimmer said he thought it was over. Rico Petrocelli said it looked like a pitcher who hurt his arm, trying to make a comeback as a hitter.

Carbo's pinch three-run home run tied the score 6-6, paving the way for Carlton Fisk's game-winning homer in the bottom of the twelfth for a 7-6 Red Sox victory. Carbo's pinch homer was his second of the Series, tying Chuck Essegian's 16-year-old record for most in a World Series. Game 7, watched by an estimated 71 million TV viewers, saw the Reds triumph in the ninth inning on a bloop single by Joe Morgan for a 4-3 win. Carbo's Game 6 home run was later inducted into the Boston Red Sox Hall of Fame in 2004 as a memorable moment.

Tom Yawkey would pass away in 1976, and Carbo wept. Carbo saw Yawkey as a father figure, because his father did not really care about him. Even after his game tying home run in Game 6, he waited all night for a call and did not receive one. New owners Haywood Sullivan and Buddy LeRoux hired a private detective to follow Carbo.

=== Later career ===
Carbo's contract was sold to the Cleveland Indians in June 1978. This made Bill Lee mad, and he called the owners "gutless" and staged a walkout. Carbo's major league career ended in 1980 with the Pittsburgh Pirates. In a 12-year career, Carbo was a .264 hitter with 96 home runs and 358 RBI in 1,010 games.

In 1989–90, while playing in a senior league in St. Petersburg, Florida, Carbo hit rock bottom. His mother had committed suicide, his father died two months later, and his family was disintegrating. He was spending $32,000 a month on drugs (mostly cocaine). Dalton Jones, a member of the Red Sox 1967 Impossible Dream team, took one look at Carbo and said, "You need Jesus."

Carbo was the manager for the Pensacola Pelicans from 2003 to 2005. Carbo compiled a record of 150–103 in his three seasons as the field manager, a winning percentage of .593. He led the Pelicans to the championship series in the independent Southeastern League in 2003, losing to the Baton Rouge RiverBats. Carbo resigned in February 2006, in order to return full-time to Diamond Club Ministry.

== After baseball ==
After retiring, Carbo went on to cosmetology school and opened a hairdressing salon. In 1985, in a federal drug distribution trial, former Cardinal Keith Hernandez said Carbo was the man who introduced him to cocaine in 1980. Carbo subsequently lost his house and his salon because of the bad publicity.

He has since become a born again Christian. In 1993, he founded the evangelical organization "Diamond Club Ministry." and now spends his time ministering to families and their children through his love for the game. He says he has not used drugs or alcohol in over fifteen years.

On April 1, 2010, in an interview with the Boston Globe, Carbo admitted to doing drugs during the 1975 World Series. He states, "I probably smoked two joints, drank about three or four beers, got to the ballpark, took some [amphetamines], took a pain pill, drank a cup of coffee, chewed some tobacco, had a cigarette, and got up to the plate and hit." It was not just a one-time binge, however. In the same article, Carbo states, "I played every game high. I was addicted to anything you could possibly be addicted to. I played the outfield sometimes where it looked like the stars were falling from the sky."

"I threw away my career", said Carbo. "If I knew Jesus Christ was my savior at 17, I would have been one heck of a ballplayer, a near Hall of Famer. Instead, I wanted to die."

== See also ==
- The Sporting News Rookie of the Year Award
