= Joe Henderson (baseball) =

American baseball player (born 1946)

- Pitcher
- Born: July 4, 1946 (age 79); Lake Cormorant, Mississippi, U.S.
- Batted: Left Threw: Right

MLB debut
- June 7, 1974, for the Chicago White Sox

Last MLB appearance
- July 16, 1977, for the Cincinnati Reds

MLB statistics
- Win–loss record: 3–2
- Earned run average: 6.69
- Strikeouts: 27
- Stats at Baseball Reference

Teams
- Chicago White Sox (1974); Cincinnati Reds (1976–1977)

Joseph Lee Henderson (born July 4, 1946) is an American former professional baseball player. He played in Major League Baseball as a pitcher for the Chicago White Sox and Cincinnati Reds during the mid-1970s.

== Biography ==
Henderson was selected by the California Angels in the fifth round of the 1965 Major League Baseball draft, as a third baseman out of Edison High School in Fresno, California. His professional career spanned 1965 to 1981. Early in his professional career, he converted to pitching, posting a 17–8 win–loss record at the Class A level in 1968, but he missed most of the 1969 season due to injury. Henderson first reached the Triple-A level in 1971. On July 31, 1974, he pitched a no-hitter for the Triple-A Iowa Oaks.

Henderson played parts of three seasons in the major leagues, in 1974 with the Chicago White Sox and in 1976 and 1977 with the Cincinnati Reds, exclusively as a pitcher. In four games with the 1976 Cincinnati Reds, he did not allow an earned run in 11 innings pitched. The Reds went on to win the 1976 World Series, although Henderson did not pitch for them in the postseason. After 1977, he completed he professional career in the Mexican League; league records of the era are incomplete.

Overall, in 16 major-league games (three starts), Henderson compiled a 3–2 record with a 6.69 earned run average (ERA) while striking out 27 batters in 35 innings. During his minor-league career, Henderson compiled an 80–49 record in 276 games pitched (111 starts), posting a 3.24 ERA while striking out 831 batters in 1085 innings. He also played 230 games as an outfielder, 59 games as a first baseman, and 14 games as a third baseman during his minor-league career. He hit 37 home runs and had 160 runs batted in (RBIs) in 1265 minor-league at bats, compiling a .206 batting average.

Following his baseball career, Henderson worked for Circle K, and helped former teammate Rudy May join the company after his baseball career ended. Henderson's nephew Dave Henderson was also a major-league player.
