= Jim Burton (baseball) =

American baseball player (1949–2013)

- Relief pitcher
- Born: October 27, 1949; Royal Oak, Michigan, U.S.
- Died: December 12, 2013 (aged 64); Charlotte, North Carolina, U.S.
- Batted: Right Threw: Left

MLB debut
- June 10, 1975, for the Boston Red Sox

Last MLB appearance
- September 17, 1977, for the Boston Red Sox

MLB statistics
- Win–loss record: 1–2
- Earned run average: 2.75
- Strikeouts: 42
- Stats at Baseball Reference

Teams
- Boston Red Sox (1975, 1977)
Medals
Men's baseball
Representing United States
Amateur World Series
Silver medal – second place	1970 Cartagena	Team

Jim Scott Burton (October 27, 1949 – December 12, 2013) was an American middle relief pitcher who played for the Boston Red Sox in the 1975 and 1977 seasons. Listed at 6 feet 3 inches (1.91 m), 175 pounds (79 kg), Burton batted right-handed and threw left-handed. He was born in Royal Oak, Michigan.

The Red Sox drafted Burton out of the University of Michigan in the first round (5th pick) of the 1971 draft. He was 25 years old when he made his major league debut on June 10, 1975. His uniform number was 43.

== Professional career ==
Burton is best known as the losing pitcher of Game 7 of the 1975 World Series. After Red Sox manager Darrell Johnson pinch hit for closer Jim Willoughby in the bottom of the eighth inning, Burton was sent to the mound for the top of the ninth inning to face the Cincinnati Reds in a 3–3 tied game. In two-thirds of an inning, he walked two batters and surrendered the game-winning hit to the Reds' Joe Morgan.

Burton made his last pitching appearance on September 17, 1977. Then, on March 29, 1978, he was traded by the Red Sox to the New York Mets in exchange for utility infielder Leo Foster.

In a two-season career, Burton posted a 1–2 record with a 2.75 ERA and one save in 30 games pitched. He played 29 games in the 1975 season, with 53 innings pitched and a 2.89 ERA, but only pitched 2.2 innings in a 1977 game. His one save came on September 13, 1975, in the second game of a Red Sox doubleheader against the Brewers. Burton pitched 1 2/3 scoreless innings to nail down the 6–3 victory over the Brewers. Burton saved the game for starting pitcher Reggie Cleveland.

== Death ==
Burton died in December 2013 in Charlotte, North Carolina, at the age of 64.
