= Santo Alcalá =

Dominican baseball player (born 1952)

- Pitcher
- Born: December 23, 1952 (age 72); San Pedro de Macorís, Dominican Republic
- Batted: Right Threw: Right

MLB debut
- April 10, 1976, for the Cincinnati Reds

Last MLB appearance
- September 25, 1977, for the Montreal Expos

MLB statistics
- Win–loss record: 14–11
- Earned run average: 4.76
- Strikeouts: 140
- Stats at Baseball Reference

Teams
- Cincinnati Reds (1976–1977); Montreal Expos (1977)

Santo Anibal Alcalá (born December 23, 1952) is a Dominican former Major League Baseball starting pitcher. He batted and threw right-handed during his baseball career. Alcala was signed by the Cincinnati Reds organization as an amateur free agent and initially assigned to the minor leagues.

== Major League Baseball career ==
Alcala made his major league debut on April 10, 1976, with the Cincinnati Reds. Alcala pitched to four batters, giving up four hits and three earned runs in his debut. In 1976, Alcala pitched one shutout. Despite winning 11 games in 1976, Alcala had an earned run average of 4.70, with a strikeout-to-walk ratio of 67–67. While Alcala's team went on to the World Series, Alcala didn't have any playoff appearances. At age 23, Alcala was the second youngest player on an aging 1976 Reds team. In 1977, Alcala had a 5.74 earned run average before being traded to the Expos, where he recorded a 4.69 earned run average. In his final major league appearance, Alcala pitched a scoreless inning in relief, bringing his 1977 earned run average to 4.83.

On May 21, 1977, the Cincinnati Reds traded Alcala to the Montreal Expos for players to be named later. The Expos later sent Shane Rawley and Angel Torres to the Cincinnati Reds to complete the trade. In 1978, Alcala was selected off waivers by the Seattle Mariners, only to be sent back to the Expos in the same year. He never pitched in the major leagues again.

At the time of his retirement Alcala had a 14–11 record, a 4.76 ERA, 121 walks, and 140 strikeouts. Alcala was 8 for 71 hitting, with a lifetime batting average of .113. His lifetime fielding percentage was .978.
