= 1975 World Series =

72nd edition of Major League Baseball's championship series

Team (Wins)	Managers	Season
Cincinnati Reds (4)	Sparky Anderson	108–54, .667, GA: 20
Boston Red Sox (3)	Darrell Johnson	95–65, .594, GA: 4 1/2
- Dates: October 11–22
- Venue(s): Fenway Park (Boston); Riverfront Stadium (Cincinnati)
- MVP: Pete Rose (Cincinnati)
- Umpires: Art Frantz (AL), Dick Stello (NL), George Maloney (AL), Satch Davidson (NL), Larry Barnett (AL), Nick Colosi (NL)
- Hall of Famers: Reds: Sparky Anderson (mgr.); Johnny Bench; Joe Morgan; Tony Pérez; Red Sox: Carlton Fisk; Jim Rice (injured); Carl Yastrzemski

Broadcast
- Television: NBC
- TV announcers: Curt Gowdy (Games 1, 3, 5, 7); Joe Garagiola (Games 2, 4, 6); Dick Stockton (Games 1, 6; in Boston); Ned Martin (Games 2, 7; in Boston); Marty Brennaman (in Cincinnati); Tony Kubek
- Radio: NBC
- Radio announcers: Joe Garagiola (Games 1, 3, 5, 7); Curt Gowdy (Games 2, 4, 6); Marty Brennaman (in Boston); Ned Martin (Games 3, 5–6); Dick Stockton (Games 4, 7)
- ALCS: Boston Red Sox over Oakland Athletics (3–0)
- NLCS: Cincinnati Reds over Pittsburgh Pirates (3–0)

The 1975 World Series was the championship series of Major League Baseball's (MLB) 1975 season. The 72nd edition of the World Series, it was a best-of-seven playoff played between the American League (AL) champion Boston Red Sox and the National League (NL) champion Cincinnati Reds. The Reds narrowly defeated the Red Sox in seven games to win their first World Series title since 1940. Reds third baseman Pete Rose was named World Series MVP, with a batting average of .370, 10 hits, and two RBIs while scoring 3 runs.

The sixth game of the World Series was a 12-inning classic at Boston's Fenway Park, which culminated with a walk-off home run by Carlton Fisk to extend the series to seven games. The Reds rallied from a 3–0 deficit to win the seventh and deciding game of the series on a ninth-inning single by Joe Morgan after being seven outs away from elimination.

None of the six umpires in this World Series worked a previous Fall Classic, and two, Art Frantz and George Maloney, would not umpire in another. This was the fourth time in five years that a seven-game World Series winner (following Pittsburgh in 1971, and Oakland in 1972 and 1973) was outscored.

Sports outlets have hailed the 1975 Fall Classic as the greatest World Series of all time, with its Game 6 regarded as among the greatest games in MLB history.

== Background ==
=== Cincinnati Reds ===
The Reds, at the height of their Big Red Machine dynasty, recorded a franchise-high 108 victories in 1975 and won the NL West division by 20 games over the Los Angeles Dodgers. In the postseason, they swept their archrival in the Pittsburgh Pirates in the NLCS to reach the World Series for the third time this decade.

=== Boston Red Sox ===
The Red Sox won the AL East division by 4 1/2 games over the Baltimore Orioles. In the postseason, they swept the three-time defending World Series champion Oakland Athletics in the ALCS to win their first pennant in eight years. For the Red Sox, the 1975 World Series was their first World Series appearance since losing to the St. Louis Cardinals in seven games in 1967.

== Summary ==
NL Cincinnati Reds (4) vs. AL Boston Red Sox (3)

Game	Date	Score	Location	Time	Attendance
1	October 11	Cincinnati Reds – 0, Boston Red Sox – 6	Fenway Park	2:27	35,205
2	October 12	Cincinnati Reds – 3, Boston Red Sox – 2	Fenway Park	2:38	35,205
3	October 14	Boston Red Sox – 5, Cincinnati Reds – 6 (10)	Riverfront Stadium	3:03	55,392
4	October 15	Boston Red Sox – 5, Cincinnati Reds – 4	Riverfront Stadium	2:52	55,667
5	October 16	Boston Red Sox – 2, Cincinnati Reds – 6	Riverfront Stadium	2:23	56,393
6	October 21†	Cincinnati Reds – 6, Boston Red Sox – 7 (12)	Fenway Park	4:01	35,205
7	October 22	Cincinnati Reds – 4, Boston Red Sox – 3	Fenway Park	2:52	35,205

†: postponed from October 18 due to rain

== Matchups ==
=== Game 1 ===
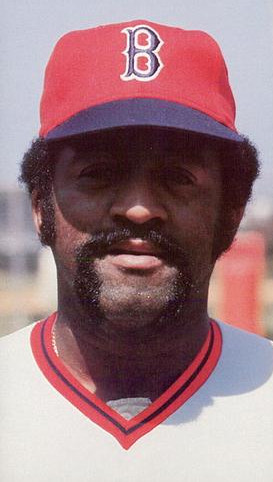
Luis Tiant

October 11, 1975 1:00 pm (ET) at Fenway Park in Boston, Massachusetts 59 °F (15 °C), drizzle
Team	1	2	3	4	5	6	7	8	9	R	H	E
Cincinnati	0	0	0	0	0	0	0	0	0	0	5	0
Boston	0	0	0	0	0	0	6	0	X	6	12	0
WP: Luis Tiant (1–0) LP: Don Gullett (0–1)

Ace pitchers Luis Tiant and Don Gullett were locked in a scoreless duel until the seventh inning. Tiant led off with a single and later scored Boston's first run on a single by Carl Yastrzemski. Then the floodgates opened: Reds reliever Clay Carroll walked Carlton Fisk to force in a run, Rico Petrocelli slapped a two-run single, Rick Burleson had an RBI single, and Cecil Cooper ended the scoring with a sacrifice fly. Tiant finished with a five-hitter against a team that had scored an MLB-high 840 runs during the regular season.

=== Game 2 ===
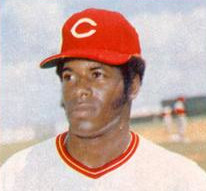
Ken Griffey Sr.

October 12, 1975 1:00 pm (ET) at Fenway Park in Boston, Massachusetts 55 °F (13 °C), overcast
Team	1	2	3	4	5	6	7	8	9	R	H	E
Cincinnati	0	0	0	1	0	0	0	0	2	3	7	1
Boston	1	0	0	0	0	1	0	0	0	2	7	0
WP: Rawly Eastwick (1–0) LP: Dick Drago (0–1)

Game 2 proved to be a very pivotal game as the Reds were on the brink of being down two games before rallying for victory in the ninth inning. Red Sox starter Bill Lee held the Reds to four hits and a run through eight innings. Johnny Bench led off the ninth with a double to right field. Lee was then replaced by right-handed closer Dick Drago. Bench moved to third on a groundout by Tony Pérez. After George Foster popped out for the second out, Dave Concepción hit a clutch single up the middle that Boston second baseman Denny Doyle fielded behind second base, but had no play at first as Bench scored to tie the game. After Concepcion stole second base, Ken Griffey hit a double into left-center field scoring Concepcion with the game-winner. Rawly Eastwick retired the Sox in the ninth to get the win and even the series.

The Reds' only other run scored in the fourth when Joe Morgan walked, went to third on a Bench single, and scored on a Pérez force out.

The Red Sox sandwiched the Reds' run with single tallies of their own in the first inning on an RBI single by Carlton Fisk, and in the sixth on an RBI single by Rico Petrocelli.

=== Game 3 ===
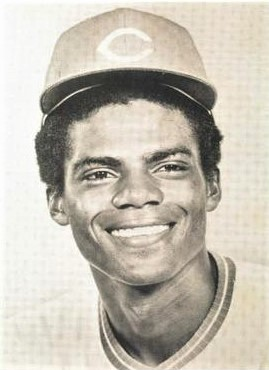
Ed Armbrister

October 14, 1975 8:30 pm (ET) at Riverfront Stadium in Cincinnati, Ohio 72 °F (22 °C), mostly clear
Team	1	2	3	4	5	6	7	8	9	10	R	H	E
Boston	0	1	0	0	0	1	1	0	2	0	5	10	2
Cincinnati	0	0	0	2	3	0	0	0	0	1	6	7	0
WP: Rawly Eastwick (2–0) LP: Jim Willoughby (0–1); Home runs: BOS: Carlton Fisk (1), Bernie Carbo (1), Dwight Evans (1); CIN: Johnny Bench (1), Dave Concepción (1), César Gerónimo (1)

At home, the Reds prevailed in another squeaker in a game that featured the first major controversy of the series that involved the umpires.

For nine innings, the game was a homer-fest as each team put three over the wall. Fisk put the Sox on the board in the second with a homer off Reds starter Gary Nolan. The Reds countered by taking a 2–1 lead in the fourth when Tony Pérez walked and Johnny Bench hit a two-run shot off Sox starter Rick Wise. The Reds then chased Wise in the fifth when Dave Concepción and César Gerónimo hit back-to-back home runs. Pete Rose followed with a one-out triple and scored on Joe Morgan's sacrifice fly to give the Reds a 5–1 lead. The Sox scratched back in the sixth when Reds reliever Pat Darcy issued consecutive walks to Carl Yastrzemski and Fisk, wild-pitched Yastrzemski to third, and then gave up a sacrifice fly to Fred Lynn. In the seventh, former Cincinnati Red Bernie Carbo closed the gap to 5–3 with a pinch-hit homer off Clay Carroll. In the top of the ninth, with Reds closer Eastwick on the mound, Rico Petrocelli singled and Evans hit the game-tying home run, sending the game into extra innings.

After the Red Sox failed to score in the tenth, the Reds sent the bottom of the order to lead off the bottom of the tenth. Cesar Geronimo led off with a single off Jim Willoughby. Reds manager Sparky Anderson then sent pinch-hitter Ed Armbrister up to sacrifice in place of reliever Rawly Eastwick. Armbrister's bunt bounced high near the plate toward the first-base line. Boston catcher Carlton Fisk was quick to pounce on the ball in front of the plate as Armbrister was slow to get out of the box. He hesitated before running and appeared to collide with (or at least impede) Fisk as he was retrieving the ball. Fisk's hurried throw to second base to force out Geronimo sailed over shortstop Rick Burleson into center field as Geronimo went to third base and Armbrister to second. Fisk and Boston manager Darrell Johnson argued that Armbrister should have been ruled out for interference, but home plate umpire Larry Barnett ruled otherwise. The play stood and the Reds had the potential winning run on third with no outs. Willoughby then intentionally walked Pete Rose to load the bases and set up a force play at any base. Johnson then brought in left-hander Roger Moret, to face Ken Griffey, but Anderson countered with right-handed hitting Merv Rettenmund. Rettenmund struck out for out No. 1, but Joe Morgan knocked in Geronimo with the game-winner by hitting a deep fly to center over a drawn in outfield.

=== Game 4 ===
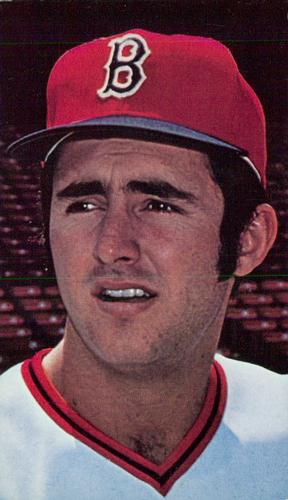
Fred Lynn

October 15, 1975 8:30 pm (ET) at Riverfront Stadium in Cincinnati, Ohio 64 °F (18 °C), overcast
Team	1	2	3	4	5	6	7	8	9	R	H	E
Boston	0	0	0	5	0	0	0	0	0	5	11	1
Cincinnati	2	0	0	2	0	0	0	0	0	4	9	1
WP: Luis Tiant (2–0) LP: Fred Norman (0–1)

With the Reds leading the series 2–1, Luis Tiant pitched his second complete game win of the Series. More importantly, this win forced the Reds to win at least one of two games at Fenway Park to win the Series.

The Reds struck first off Tiant in the first on RBI doubles by Ken Griffey and Johnny Bench. The Sox, however, would get all the runs they needed in the fourth. Dwight Evans tied the game with a two-run triple, then Rick Burleson put the Sox ahead by doubling in Evans off Reds starter Fred Norman. Tiant, continuing his surprising hitting, singled Burleson to third. Burleson then scored on a Tony Pérez error on a ball hit by Juan Beníquez, while Tiant went to second. Carl Yastrzemski drove in Tiant with a single for what would turn out to be the winning run.

The Reds were able to counter with two runs in their half of the fourth on an RBI double by Dave Concepción and an RBI triple by César Gerónimo. The Reds had a shot at winning the game in the bottom of the ninth when, with two on and one out, Ken Griffey sent a deep drive into left-center that Fred Lynn made an over the shoulder catch. Joe Morgan then popped out to first on Tiant's 163rd pitch of the game. Boston's win tied the series at two games apiece and guaranteed a return to Fenway.

=== Game 5 ===
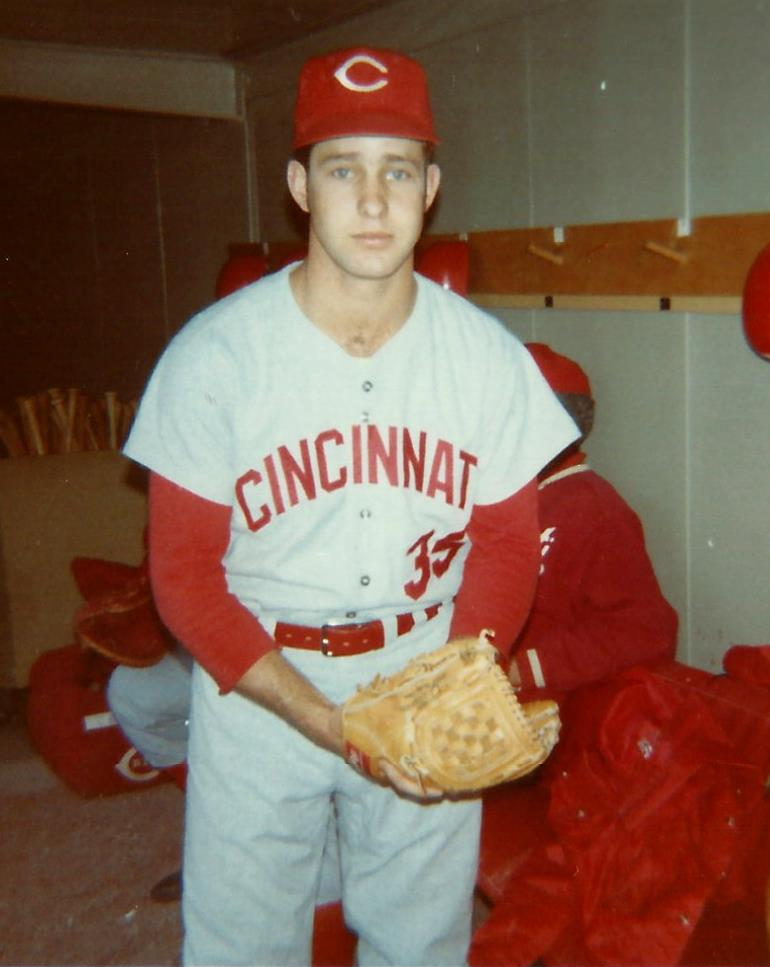
Don Gullett

October 16, 1975 8:30 pm (ET) at Riverfront Stadium in Cincinnati, Ohio 54 °F (12 °C), overcast
Team	1	2	3	4	5	6	7	8	9	R	H	E
Boston	1	0	0	0	0	0	0	0	1	2	5	0
Cincinnati	0	0	0	1	1	3	0	1	X	6	8	0
WP: Don Gullett (1–1) LP: Reggie Cleveland (0–1) Sv: Rawly Eastwick (1); Home runs: BOS: None; CIN: Tony Pérez 2 (2)

Reds' lefty Don Gullett pitched like an ace as the Reds won their final home game in Game 5 to put Cincinnati on the brink of their first World Series championship in 35 years. Cincinnati first baseman and cleanup hitter Tony Pérez broke out of an 0–for–15 World Series slump with a pair of home runs while driving in four runs off Boston starter Reggie Cleveland. Pete Rose contributed an RBI double and Dave Concepción hit a sacrifice fly for the other Reds runs, while Gullett pitched 8 2/3 innings, limiting the powerful Boston lineup to five hits. Reds closer Rawly Eastwick came on to strike out Boston third baseman Rico Petrocelli for the game's final out.

=== Game 6 ===
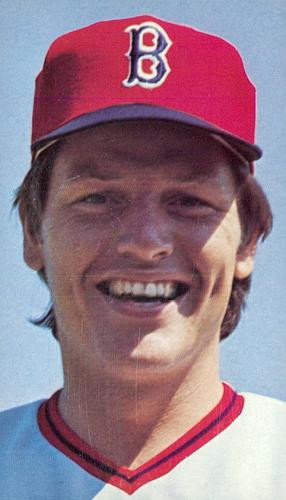
Carlton Fisk in 1976.

October 21, 1975 8:15 pm (ET) at Fenway Park in Boston, Massachusetts 63 °F (17 °C), partly cloudy
Team	1	2	3	4	5	6	7	8	9	10	11	12	R	H	E
Cincinnati	0	0	0	0	3	0	2	1	0	0	0	0	6	14	0
Boston	3	0	0	0	0	0	0	3	0	0	0	1	7	10	1
WP: Rick Wise (1–0) LP: Pat Darcy (0–1); Home runs: CIN: César Gerónimo (2); BOS: Fred Lynn (1), Bernie Carbo (2), Carlton Fisk (2)

With a travel day followed by three days of heavy rain in Boston, both pitching staffs got four days of rest. Red Sox manager Darrell Johnson was afforded the luxury of having his top two starting pitchers, Luis Tiant and Bill Lee, available for Games 6 and 7, respectively, while the Reds were able to have their ace, Don Gullett, available for a potential Game 7 after pitching a gem in Game 5.

With the Red Sox in a must win situation, Boston's Fred Lynn opened the scoring in the first with a two-out, three-run homer off Reds starter Gary Nolan. Meanwhile, Tiant breezed through the first four innings, holding the Reds scoreless. The Reds finally broke through in the fifth. With Ed Armbrister on third and Pete Rose on first, Ken Griffey tripled to deep center field on a ball that Lynn just missed making a leaping catch against the wall. He suffered a rib injury, but remained in the game; Lynn told moderator Bob Costas during MLB Network's "Top 20 games in the last 50 years" that, for a short time, he was barely conscious and couldn't feel his legs. Johnny Bench singled Griffey home to tie the game at 3–3.

With two outs in the seventh, George Foster put the Reds ahead with a two-run double high off the center field wall. In the top of the eighth, César Gerónimo led off and hit the first pitch down the right-field line for a home run to chase Tiant and give the Reds a 6–3 lead.

In the bottom of the eighth, Reds reliever Pedro Borbón gave up an infield single off his leg to Lynn, and then walked Rico Petrocelli to bring the tying run to the plate. Rawly Eastwick replaced Borbón, struck out Dwight Evans, and retired Rick Burleson on a line-out to left. Bernie Carbo was called on to bat for reliever Roger Moret. Sparky Anderson was on the top step of the dugout, ready to call in left-hander Will McEnaney to pitch to the left-hand hitting Carbo. Anderson said later that he was concerned that the Sox would call on right-handed Juan Beníquez to pinch hit for Carbo if he made the move. Carbo looked overmatched by Eastwick, missing on a swing for a 2–2 count; he fouled off two more pitches late, the latter just barely fought off to avoid a strikeout. On the next pitch, Carbo tied the game with a three-run home run to center field. It was his second pinch-hit homer in the series, tying the record set by Chuck Essegian in 1959.

As Carbo approached third base on his home run trot, Carbo yelled out to former teammate Rose, "Hey, Pete, don't you wish you were that strong?" To which Rose replied, "This is fun."

In the bottom of the ninth, the Red Sox appeared poised to win. Denny Doyle walked on four pitches and went to third on a Carl Yastrzemski single; McEnaney, the Reds' seventh pitcher, replaced Eastwick and intentionally walked Carlton Fisk, loading the bases with no outs to face the left-handed hitting Lynn. He flied out to Foster in foul territory in left; Doyle tagged up and attempted to score but was thrown out as Bench caught the ball on a bounce and made a sweeping tag from fair territory to nip him just before his hand touched the plate. With runners at first and third, McEnaney retired Petrocelli with a ground ball to end the jam.

Rose led off the top of the 11th and was awarded first base after a pitch lightly grazed him. Griffey bunted, but Fisk's throw forced out Rose at second base. Joe Morgan hit a deep drive to right off Dick Drago that looked to be for extra bases. Evans made a leaping catch near the visitors bullpen in deep right to rob Morgan and doubled-up Griffey at first.

In the top of the 12th, Boston's Rick Wise caught Gerónimo looking with two men on to end the threat. In the bottom of the inning, Pat Darcy, the Reds' eighth pitcher, remained in the game after retiring the previous six batters in order. As the game passed four hours, Fisk led off; with a 1–0 count, he lifted a sinker down the left-field line and the ball struck the foul pole well above the Green Monster. In what has now become an iconic baseball film highlight, NBC's left-field game camera (in the scoreboard) caught Fisk wildly waving his arms to his right after hitting the ball and watching its path while drifting down the first base line, as if he was trying to coax the ball to "stay fair." The ball indeed stayed fair and Fisk triumphantly leaped into the air as the Red Sox tied the Series. (The cameraman in the scoreboard was supposed to follow the flight of the ball but was distracted by a nearby rat and ended up capturing Fisk instead.) This would be the last time in World Series play that a catcher hit a home run in extra innings until J. T. Realmuto did so in the 2022 World Series, 47 years later. To date, this is the last World Series game the Reds have lost.

This game ranked No. 7 in ESPN SportsCentury Greatest Games of the 20th Century in 1999.

=== Game 7 ===
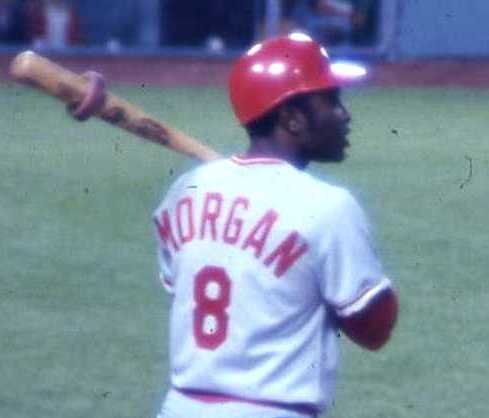
Joe Morgan

October 22, 1975 8:15 pm (ET) at Fenway Park in Boston, Massachusetts 67 °F (19 °C), clear
Team	1	2	3	4	5	6	7	8	9	R	H	E
Cincinnati	0	0	0	0	0	2	1	0	1	4	9	0
Boston	0	0	3	0	0	0	0	0	0	3	5	2
WP: Clay Carroll (1–0) LP: Jim Burton (0–1) Sv: Will McEnaney (1); Home runs: CIN: Tony Pérez (3); BOS: None

The game was scoreless until the third inning when Reds starter Don Gullett experienced control problems. After giving up an RBI single to Carl Yastrzemski, Gullett walked Carlton Fisk to load the bases. He then walked Rico Petrocelli and Dwight Evans to force in two more runs before striking out Rick Burleson for the final out. Gullett pitched a scoreless fourth before being relieved by Jack Billingham. The Reds bullpen pitched five scoreless innings to give the offense a chance to rally.

Boston starter Bill Lee was again sharp, as he shut out the Reds through five innings. In the sixth, with Pete Rose on first base and one out, Johnny Bench hit a routine grounder that appeared would be an inning-ending double play. Shortstop Burleson fielded the grounder and under-handed the ball to Denny Doyle covering second base to force Rose out at second. But as Doyle pivoted to make a throw to first base, Rose slid high and hard into Doyle to force an errant throw that sailed into the Boston dugout preventing the double play as Bench moved onto second base. On a 1–0 count, Lee threw a blooper pitch to Tony Pérez who slammed the ball over the Green Monster and onto Lansdowne Street for a two-run home run, his third home run in the final three Series games, to draw the Reds to within 3–2.

The Reds tied it in the seventh when Lee walked Ken Griffey, who stole second and scored on a two-out single to centerfield by Rose off of reliever Roger Moret.

In the ninth, Boston left-handed rookie reliever Jim Burton entered the game and began by walking the leadoff man Griffey, who was sacrificed to second by César Gerónimo, and went to third on a groundout by Dan Driessen. Burton then walked Rose to set up a forceout, but Joe Morgan reached down and blooped a low breaking ball into center field to score Griffey with the go-ahead run. It was the second time in the series Rose was intentionally walked prior to Morgan driving in the game-winning run. Morgan, the 1975 National League MVP, also knocked in the game-winner in Game 3.

Will McEnaney retired the Sox in order, with Yastrzemski flying out to center fielder Geronimo to end the game, clinching a World Series championship that had eluded the Reds for 35 years, and extending the Curse of the Bambino to 57 years. It would not be broken until 2004, after the Red Sox went 86 years without a championship.

== Composite line score ==
1975 World Series (4–3): Cincinnati Reds (N.L.) beat Boston Red Sox (A.L.).

Team	1	2	3	4	5	6	7	8	9	10	11	12	R	H	E
Cincinnati Reds	2	0	0	6	7	5	3	2	3	1	0	0	29	59	2
Boston Red Sox	5	1	3	5	0	2	7	3	3	0	0	1	30	60	6
Total attendance: 308,272 Average attendance: 44,039; Winning player's share: $19,060 Losing player's share: $13,326

For the fourth time in five years, the Series went a full seven games and the champions were outscored.

== Series statistics ==
=== Boston Red Sox ===
==== Batting ====
Note: GP=Games played; AB=At bats; R=Runs; H=Hits; 2B=Doubles; 3B=Triples; HR=Home runs; RBI=Runs batted in; BB=Walks; AVG=Batting average; OBP=On base percentage; SLG=Slugging percentage

Player	GP	AB	R	H	2B	3B	HR	RBI	BB	AVG	OBP	SLG	Reference
Carlton Fisk	7	25	5	6	0	0	2	4	7	.240	.406	.480	
Carl Yastrzemski	7	29	7	9	0	0	0	4	4	.310	.382	.310	
Denny Doyle	7	30	3	8	1	1	0	0	2	.267	.313	.367	
Rico Petrocelli	7	26	3	8	1	0	0	4	3	.308	.379	.346	
Rick Burleson	7	24	1	7	1	0	0	2	4	.292	.393	.333	
Juan Beniquez	3	8	0	1	0	0	0	1	1	.125	.222	.125	
Fred Lynn	7	25	3	7	1	0	1	5	3	.280	.345	.440	
Dwight Evans	7	24	3	7	1	1	1	5	3	.292	.393	.542	
Cecil Cooper	5	19	0	1	1	0	0	1	0	.053	.050	.105	
Bernie Carbo	4	7	3	3	1	0	2	4	1	.429	.500	1.429	
Rick Miller	3	2	0	0	0	0	0	0	0	.000	.000	.000	
Doug Griffin	1	1	0	0	0	0	0	0	0	.000	.000	.000	
Bob Montgomery	1	1	0	0	0	0	0	0	0	.000	.000	.000	
Luis Tiant	3	8	2	2	0	0	0	0	2	.250	.400	.250	
Bill Lee	2	6	0	1	0	0	0	0	0	.167	.167	.167	
Reggie Cleveland	3	2	0	0	0	0	0	0	0	.000	.000	.000	
Rick Wise	2	2	0	0	0	0	0	0	0	.000	.000	.000	

==== Pitching ====
Note: G=Games Played; GS=Games Started; IP=Innings Pitched; H=Hits; BB=Walks; R=Runs; ER=Earned Runs; SO=Strikeouts; W=Wins; L=Losses; SV=Saves; ERA=Earned Run Average

Player	G	GS	IP	H	BB	R	ER	SO	W	L	SV	ERA	Reference
Luis Tiant	3	3	25	25	8	10	10	12	2	0	0	3.60	
Bill Lee	2	2	14 1/3	12	3	5	5	7	0	0	0	3.14	
Reggie Cleveland	3	1	6 2/3	7	3	5	5	5	0	1	0	6.75	
Rick Wise	2	1	5 1/3	6	2	5	5	2	1	0	0	8.44	
Jim Willoughby	3	0	6 1/3	3	0	1	0	2	0	1	0	0.00	
Dick Drago	2	0	4	3	1	1	1	1	0	1	0	2.25	
Roger Moret	3	0	1 2/3	2	3	0	0	1	0	0	0	0.00	
Jim Burton	2	0	1	1	3	1	1	0	0	1	0	9.00	
Diego Segui	1	0	1	0	0	0	0	0	0	0	0	0.00	
Dick Pole	1	0	0	0	2	1	1	0	0	0	0	∞	

=== Cincinnati Reds ===
==== Batting ====
Note: GP=Games played; AB=At bats; R=Runs; H=Hits; 2B=Doubles; 3B=Triples; HR=Home runs; RBI=Runs batted in; BB=Walks; AVG=Batting average; OBP=On base percentage; SLG=Slugging percentage

Player	GP	AB	R	H	2B	3B	HR	RBI	BB	AVG	OBP	SLG	Reference
Johnny Bench	7	29	5	6	2	0	1	4	2	.207	.258	.379	
Tony Pérez	7	28	4	5	0	0	3	7	3	.179	.258	.500	
Joe Morgan	7	27	4	5	1	0	0	3	5	.259	.364	.296	
Pete Rose	7	27	3	10	1	1	0	2	5	.370	.485	.481	
Dave Concepción	7	28	3	5	1	0	1	4	0	.179	.200	.321	
George Foster	7	29	1	8	1	0	0	2	1	.276	.300	.310	
César Gerónimo	7	25	3	7	0	1	2	3	3	.280	.357	.600	
Ken Griffey	7	26	4	7	3	1	0	4	4	.269	.367	.462	
Merv Rettenmund	3	3	0	0	0	0	0	0	0	.000	.000	.000	
Darrel Chaney	2	2	0	0	0	0	0	0	0	.000	.000	.000	
Terry Crowley	2	2	0	1	0	0	0	0	0	.500	.500	.500	
Dan Driessen	2	2	0	0	0	0	0	0	0	.000	.000	.000	
Ed Ambrister	4	1	1	0	0	0	0	0	2	.000	.667	.000	
Don Gullett	3	7	1	2	0	0	0	0	0	.286	.286	.286	
Jack Billingham	3	2	0	0	0	0	0	0	0	.000	.000	.000	
Rawly Eastwick	5	1	0	0	0	0	0	0	0	.000	.000	.000	
Will McEnaney	5	1	0	1	0	0	0	0	0	1.000	1.000	1.000	
Gary Nolan	2	1	0	0	0	0	0	0	0	.000	.000	.000	
Pat Darcy	2	1	0	0	0	0	0	0	0	.000	.000	.000	
Fred Norman	2	1	0	0	0	0	0	0	0	.000	.000	.000	
Pedro Borbón	3	1	0	0	0	0	0	0	0	.000	.000	.000	

==== Pitching ====
Note: G=Games Played; GS=Games Started; IP=Innings Pitched; H=Hits; BB=Walks; R=Runs; ER=Earned Runs; SO=Strikeouts; W=Wins; L=Losses; SV=Saves; ERA=Earned Run Average

Player	G	GS	IP	H	BB	R	ER	SO	W	L	SV	ERA	Reference
Don Gullett	3	3	18 2/3	19	10	9	9	15	1	1	0	4.34	
Jack Billingham	3	1	9	8	5	2	1	7	0	0	0	1.00	
Rawly Eastwick	5	0	8	6	3	2	2	4	2	0	1	2.25	
Will McEnaney	5	0	6 2/3	3	2	2	2	5	0	0	1	2.70	
Gary Nolan	2	2	6	6	1	4	4	2	0	0	0	6.00	
Pat Darcy	2	0	4	3	2	2	2	1	0	1	0	4.50	
Fred Norman	2	1	4	8	3	4	4	2	0	1	0	9.00	
Pedro Borbón	3	0	3	3	2	3	2	1	0	0	0	6.00	
Clay Carroll	5	0	5 2/3	4	2	2	2	3	1	0	0	3.18	

== Broadcasting ==
NBC aired the series on television and radio. Curt Gowdy and Joe Garagiola alternated the play-by-play between the two mediums along with local team announcers Dick Stockton and Ned Martin (Red Sox) and Marty Brennaman (Reds), while Tony Kubek provided color commentary on the telecasts.

This was the final World Series play-by-play assignment for Gowdy, who had been NBC's lead baseball announcer since 1966. Garagiola took over full-time as NBC's primary play-by-play voice for baseball the following season. It was the only World Series for Stockton (who later became a prominent national announcer for CBS, Fox, and TNT) and for Martin.

This was also the last World Series broadcast for NBC Radio, which had retained exclusive rights to the event since 1957. CBS Radio became the exclusive national radio network for MLB beginning the following season.

This is the earliest World Series for which telecasts of all games survive today in their entirety. While portions of many previous Series telecasts also survive, the general practice of the networks in earlier years was to reuse old tapes to save money and space. All subsequent World Series telecasts since this one also have had all their games preserved.

== See also ==
- 1975 Japan Series
- Curse of the Bambino
