= Jack Billingham =

American baseball player (born 1943)

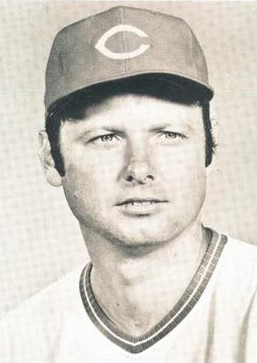
- Billingham with the Cincinnati Reds in 1974
- Pitcher
- Born: February 21, 1943 (age 83); Orlando, Florida, U.S.
- Batted: Right Threw: Right

MLB debut
- April 11, 1968, for the Los Angeles Dodgers

Last MLB appearance
- June 20, 1980, for the Boston Red Sox

MLB statistics
- Win–loss record: 145–113
- Earned run average: 3.83
- Strikeouts: 1,141
- Stats at Baseball Reference

Teams
- Los Angeles Dodgers (1968); Houston Astros (1969–1971); Cincinnati Reds (1972–1977); Detroit Tigers (1978–1980); Boston Red Sox (1980)

Career highlights and awards
- All-Star (1973); 2× World Series champion (1975, 1976); Cincinnati Reds Hall of Fame

John Eugene Billingham (born February 21, 1943) is an American former professional baseball player and coach. He played in Major League Baseball as a right-handed pitcher from 1968 through 1980, most notably as a member of the Cincinnati Reds dynasty that won three National League pennants and two World Series championships between 1972 and 1977.

Billingham's 0.36 earned run average over the 1972, 1975 and 1976 World Series was the lowest in World Series history until it was surpassed by Madison Bumgarner in 2014. He also played for the Los Angeles Dodgers, Houston Astros, Detroit Tigers and the Boston Red Sox. In 1984, Billingham was inducted into the Cincinnati Reds Hall of Fame.

== Baseball career ==
Billingham was born in Orlando, Florida and graduated from Winter Park High School in 1961. He believes that he is a distant cousin of Baseball Hall of Fame member Christy Mathewson, although the exact relationship is not known. He was signed by the Los Angeles Dodgers as an amateur free agent on June 12, 1961. He spent seven years in the Dodgers’ minor-league system, where he was groomed as a relief pitcher.

Billingham made his major league debut with the Dodgers on April 11, 1968, at the age of 25. He didn't give up a run until his seventh appearance as a relief pitcher for the Dodgers. In his only appearance as a starting pitcher, he shut out the Pirates through eight innings. Billingham finished the season with a 3-0 win–loss record with a 2.14 earned-run average however, the Dodgers left Billingham unprotected and he was selected by the Montreal Expos in the 1968 Major League Baseball expansion draft.

In January 1969, the Expos traded Donn Clendenon to the Houston Astros for Rusty Staub. Clendenon refused to report, and Billingham was later sent to Houston to complete the trade. In 1969, Billingham was again used as a reliever (52 games, 6–7 record, 4.25 ERA). In 1970 he was moved into the starting rotation (46 games, 24 starts), before becoming exclusively a starting pitcher in 1971.

On November 29, 1971, Billingham was acquired from the Astros along with Ed Armbrister, Cesar Geronimo, Denis Menke and Joe Morgan. The trade helped to transform the Reds into the juggernaut known as the Big Red Machine that would dominate the National League for the next five seasons.

In Game 3 of the 1972 World Series, Billingham pitched eight shutout innings versus the Oakland A's. Billingham was removed from the game in favor of reliever Clay Carroll by Reds' manager Sparky Anderson while facing the first Oakland batter in the bottom of the ninth inning. Cincinnati won the game, 1–0, and Billingham got credit for the victory.

In 1973, Billingham went 19–10 with a career-best 3.04 ERA. He led the National League with 40 starts, 293 innings pitched and seven shutouts and earned a berth on the National League All-Star team in the 1973 All-Star Game. He followed that with a 19–11 season in 1974. On April 4, 1974, Billingham gave up Hank Aaron's 714th career home run, which tied Aaron with Babe Ruth for No. 1 on the all-time home run list at the time.

In the 1975 World Series, he was the starting pitcher for Cincinnati in their Game 2 victory where, Billingham gave up a first-inning run before holding the Boston Red Sox scoreless for the next four innings. His scoreless streak continued in Game 6 where he appeared as a relief pitcher and allowed one hit in one inning pitched. In the climactic Game 7, Billingham entered the game in the bottom of the fifth inning as a relief pitcher with the Reds trailing the Red Sox by a score of 3–0. He held the Red Sox scoreless for two innings, allowing the Reds to come from behind to take a 4–3 victory and clinch the 1975 World Series championship.

In seven games (including three starts) for Cincinnati, he went 2–0 with a 0.36 ERA, allowing just one earned run in 25 1/3 innings pitched. In 1979, he posted a 10–9 record with the Detroit Tigers to finish his tenth consecutive season of ten or more wins.

== Career statistics ==
In a 13-season major league career, Billingham posted a 145–113 record with 1,141 strikeouts and a 3.83 earned run average in 2,231.1 innings pitched, including 27 shutouts and 74 complete games. He posted a 1.93 earned run average in 42 innings of postseason pitching.

== Awards ==
- Cincinnati Reds Hall of Fame inductee: 1984
- National League All-Star: 1973
- Johnny Vander Meer Award (Reds' Most Outstanding Pitcher): 1973

== NL leader ==
- Innings pitched: 1973 (293 1/3)
- Shutouts: 1973 (7)
- Hit batsmen: 1971 (16) and 1977 (10)

== See also ==
- List of Major League Baseball career hit batsmen leaders
