= Denis Menke =

American baseball player (1940–2020)

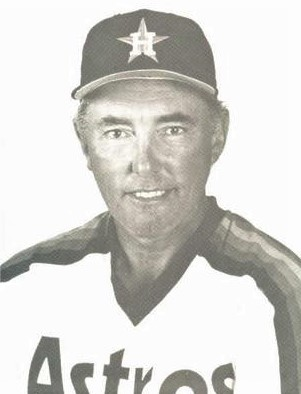
- Infielder
- Born: July 21, 1940; Bancroft, Iowa, U.S.
- Died: December 1, 2020 (aged 80); Tarpon Springs, Florida, U.S.
- Batted: Right Threw: Right

MLB debut
- April 14, 1962, for the Milwaukee Braves

Last MLB appearance
- July 10, 1974, for the Houston Astros

MLB statistics
- Batting average: .250
- Home runs: 101
- Runs batted in: 606
- Stats at Baseball Reference

Teams
- Milwaukee / Atlanta Braves (1962–1967); Houston Astros (1968–1971); Cincinnati Reds (1972–1973); Houston Astros (1974)

Career highlights and awards
- 2× All-Star (1969, 1970)

Denis John Menke (July 21, 1940 – December 1, 2020) was an American professional baseball infielder and coach. He played all or parts of 13 seasons in Major League Baseball from 1962 to 1974. He played for the Milwaukee / Atlanta Braves (1962–67), Houston Astros (1968–71, 1974) and Cincinnati Reds (1972–73), all of the National League. He was elected to the National League All-Star team in 1969 and 1970.

== Early life ==
Menke was born in Bancroft, Iowa, and raised on a 480-acre farm in the northern part of the state. He played at St. John's High School in Bancroft, where he pitched for the school's team. Menke signed with the Milwaukee Braves in 1958 for $175,000 (equivalent to $1,907,238 in 2024).

In October 1965, Bancroft held a Denis Menke Day.

== Playing career ==
=== Minor league career ===
Menke played full-time in the Braves minor league system from 1958 to 1961. In 1958–59, he split his time between Class-D and Class-B baseball, playing shortstop. In 1960, he played a full season for the Class-B Yakima Braves of the Northwest League. Again playing shortstop, he had a .336 batting average, with 28 home runs, 114 runs scored, 103 runs batted in (RBI), 88 bases on balls and a 1.039 on-base plus slugging (OPS).

In 1961, still only 20-years old, Menke was promoted to the Triple-A Vancouver Mounties of the Pacific Coast League. He hit .293, with 15 homes runs, 75 runs scored, 73 RBIs and 89 bases on balls. He again played shortstop, and had a .956 fielding percentage, the best of his minor league career at that position.

In 1962, he split the season between the Toronto Maple Leafs of the Triple-A International League and the Milwaukee Braves. He began the season with the Braves, but could not find a place in the lineup and was assigned to Toronto. Of the 79 games he played in Toronto, most were at first base, with some at second and third base. None were at shortstop. In 1961–62, the Braves had Roy McMillan at shortstop. Although McMillan only hit .220 and .246 respectively those years, his .975 fielding percentage in 1961 led all shortstops in major league baseball. McMillan's 1962 fielding percentage was .972, second in the league to José Pagán's .973.

=== Major league career ===
==== Milwaukee/Atlanta Braves ====
Menke played his first major league games in 1962, appearing in 50 games for the Braves. He hit .192 in 146 at bats, with only two home runs; the first one of which was a grand slam. He played second base, third base and first base in the field; though unlike his time in Toronto, the majority of his games were at second and third base.

In 1963, Menke played a full season with Milwaukee, batting .234 with 11 home runs. He played over 80 games at shortstop, as well as playing over 50 games at second base and over 20 at third base. He had a .976 fielding percentage at shortstop, .971 at second base, and .928 at third base. From 1964 to 1967 he played a variety of positions for the Braves, but the majority of his games were at shortstop. He suffered injuries in 1965, including missing 38 games with phlebitis after a violent collision at home plate. Over his full six-year Braves career (in Milwaukee and Atlanta), he had a .245 batting average with 59 homes runs, 257 runs scored and 248 RBIs.

==== Houston Astros ====
On October 8, 1967, the Braves traded Menke and pitcher Denny Lemaster to the Houston Astros for Sonny Jackson and Chuck Harrison, where he played from 1968 to 1971. He continued to play multiple positions as an Astro. In 1968, he played 119 of his 150 games at second base, with a .982 fielding percentage that was second in the league. In 1969-70 he played a 131 and 133 games at shortstop, respectively; and then in 1971, Menke played 101 games at first base, 32 at third base, 17 at shortstop and only five at second base. In 1970–71, he had two of his three career best hitting seasons (.269 and .304) and his best two RBI years by far (90 and 92).

Menke was selected to the 1969 and 1970 National League All-Star teams, as a shortstop. He struck out in the 1969 game. He appeared in the 1970 game and had a base on balls and was hit by a pitch, but played in the field at second base, rather than shortstop. In 1969, he was 15th in voting for the National League's Most Valuable Player award.

==== Cincinnati Reds ====
Menke was one of the five Houston players who went to the Reds in a blockbuster trade between the 1971 and 1972 seasons. Along with Menke, the Reds received future Hall of Fame second baseman Joe Morgan, starting pitcher Jack Billingham, center fielder César Gerónimo and utility outfielder Ed Armbrister, while the Astros received second baseman Tommy Helms, first baseman Lee May and utility infielder Jimmy Stewart. This trade is generally regarded as being one of the most lopsided in the history of Major League Baseball, as it was a major force in developing the Big Red Machine that would go on to win back-to-back World Series in 1975 and 1976, although Menke would be traded back to Houston before then.

Menke played for the Reds in 1972–73. In 1972, he chiefly played third base, hitting only .233 with nine home runs, though his .955 fielding percentage at third base was fifth best in the league. In the Reds 3–2 championship series victory over the Pittsburgh Pirates, Menke hit .250 in the five games. In the 1972 World Series that saw the Reds lose to the Oakland A's in seven games, Menke hit only .083 in seven games, but did have a home run. He set a world series record for most chances at third base without an error (29).

In 1973, Menke again played chiefly at third base, but his playing time was reduced as he hit only .191; though his .966 fielding percentage at third base was second best in the league. Menke was traded back to the Astros after the 1973 season for Pat Darcy and cash, where he played sparingly for one year before retiring.

==== Legacy ====
During his full 13-year career, Menke hit 101 home runs and compiled a batting average of .250. In 1964, Menke hit 20 home runs, his single season best. In 1970, as a Houston Astro, he compiled a .304 batting average, the only time he hit over .300 as a major leaguer. In 1969, Menke and Houston outfielder Jim Wynn hit grand slam home runs in the same inning.

Menke was a versatile player in the field. He played first, second, third base, shortstop, and five games as an outfielder. Menke compiled a career fielding percentage of .969. He played his last major league game July 10, 1974 with the Houston Astros.

He owns the dubious distinction of being the most unsuccessful would-be base stealer in MLB history (minimum 80 attempts), having only succeeded on 34 of his 86 career stolen base attempts, for a 38.6% success rate. He ranks 891st (as of 2025).

== Coaching career ==
Menke started his coaching career as a manager in 1977 with the Burlington Bees of the Midwest League, a farm team of the Milwaukee Brewers. The Bees won the League Championship that season in a three-game play-off against the Waterloo Indians. The following year he managed the Dunedin Blue Jays of the Florida State League, with 59 wins and 89 losses. The next year (1979) his record was 68 wins and 69 losses.

For the years 1980 and 1981 he was the first base coach for the Toronto Blue Jays.

Menke returned to the Astros as a hitting coach in 1983 and continued in that position until moving to third base coach in 1986.

In 1989 he joined the Philadelphia Phillies as the hitting coach and continued in that position until 1996. He was credited with having an individual approach with his players. He was hitting coach on an overachieving 1993 Phillies team that went to the World Series, leading the National League in hits, runs, doubles, RBIs, walks, extra-base hits, total bases, on-base percentage, and OPS. Four 1993 Phillies players had 85 or more RBIs, and eight players had 100 or more hits.

Menke finished his coaching career returning to the Cincinnati Reds as the bench coach for the years 1997–2000.

== Death ==
Menke died at his home in Tarpon Springs, Florida, on December 1, 2020, at the age of 80. He was survived by his wife of 57 years, Jean, and their three children and nine grandchildren.
