= Will McEnaney =

American baseball player (born 1952)

- Pitcher
- Born: February 14, 1952 (age 74); Springfield, Ohio, U.S.
- Batted: Left Threw: Left

MLB debut
- July 3, 1974, for the Cincinnati Reds

Last MLB appearance
- September 27, 1979, for the St. Louis Cardinals

MLB statistics
- Win–loss record: 12–17
- Earned run average: 3.76
- Strikeouts: 148
- Stats at Baseball Reference

Teams
- Cincinnati Reds (1974–1976); Montreal Expos (1977); Pittsburgh Pirates (1978); St. Louis Cardinals (1979)

Career highlights and awards
- 2× World Series champion (1975, 1976)

William Henry McEnaney (born February 14, 1952) is an American former professional baseball player. He was a left-handed pitcher over parts of six seasons in Major League Baseball (1974–79) with the Cincinnati Reds, Montreal Expos, Pittsburgh Pirates and St. Louis Cardinals.

McEnaney was one of five children of William and Eleanor (Grieb) McEnaney and attended Springfield North High School in Springfield, Ohio. He was drafted by the Reds in the eighth round of the 1970 amateur draft. He made his Major League debut at age 22 on July 3, 1974, in relief of starter Clay Carroll in a 4–1 Reds loss to the Los Angeles Dodgers at Riverfront Stadium. McEnaney's first-ever inning was a 1–2–3 one as he induced popouts from Tommy John, Davey Lopes and Bill Buckner, and for the game he pitched two scoreless innings. In his rookie season, he pitched 24 games, with a 2–1 record and a 4.44 earned run average.

McEnaney was a key member of the bullpen of the Big Red Machine Reds teams that were the 1975 and 1976 World Series champions. In 1975, he posted a 5–2 record with a 2.47 ERA and 15 saves in 70 pitching appearances. But he is best known for his performance in the Series, in which he pitched five games (6 2/3 innings) in relief with a 2.70 ERA and one save. He earned the save in the seventh and final game as he pitched a perfect three-out ninth inning.

In 1976 he fell to 2–6 with a 4.85 ERA in 55 games. But he again excelled in the World Series, pitching 4 2/3 scoreless innings in two games and earning two saves. And, just as in the previous World Series, he closed out the series with a 1–2–3 9th inning, for a four-game sweep over the New York Yankees.

In December 1976 he was traded to the Expos. In 1977, he pitched 69 games with a 3–5 record and a 3.95 ERA. He was then traded to the Pirates for the 1978 season and pitched only six games with a 10.38 ERA. Released by the Pirates, he played for the Cardinals in 1979. In that season, he pitched in 45 games with an 0–3 record and a 2.95 ERA, but it was his final season in the majors as the Cardinals released him prior to the 1980 season. For his Major League career he compiled 12–17 record with a 3.76 earned run average and 148 strikeouts in 269 appearances, all as a relief pitcher.

McEnaney played in Mexico with the Águilas de Mexicali and the Plataneros de Tabasco, as well as for the West Palm Beach Tropics of the Senior Professional Baseball Association. In 1980, while pitching for Mexicali, McEnaney hurled a 1–0 no-hitter against the Algodoneros de Guasave.

McEnaney lives in Florida with his second wife, Cindy. They have two adult sons. He also has a daughter from his first wife, Lynne Magaw. After baseball, he has been an investment banker, had a painting business, later a bathtub refinishing business for 12 years and was most recently the scoreboard operator for the Miami Marlins minor league affiliate Jupiter Hammerheads.
