= Larry Barnett =

American baseball umpire (born 1945)

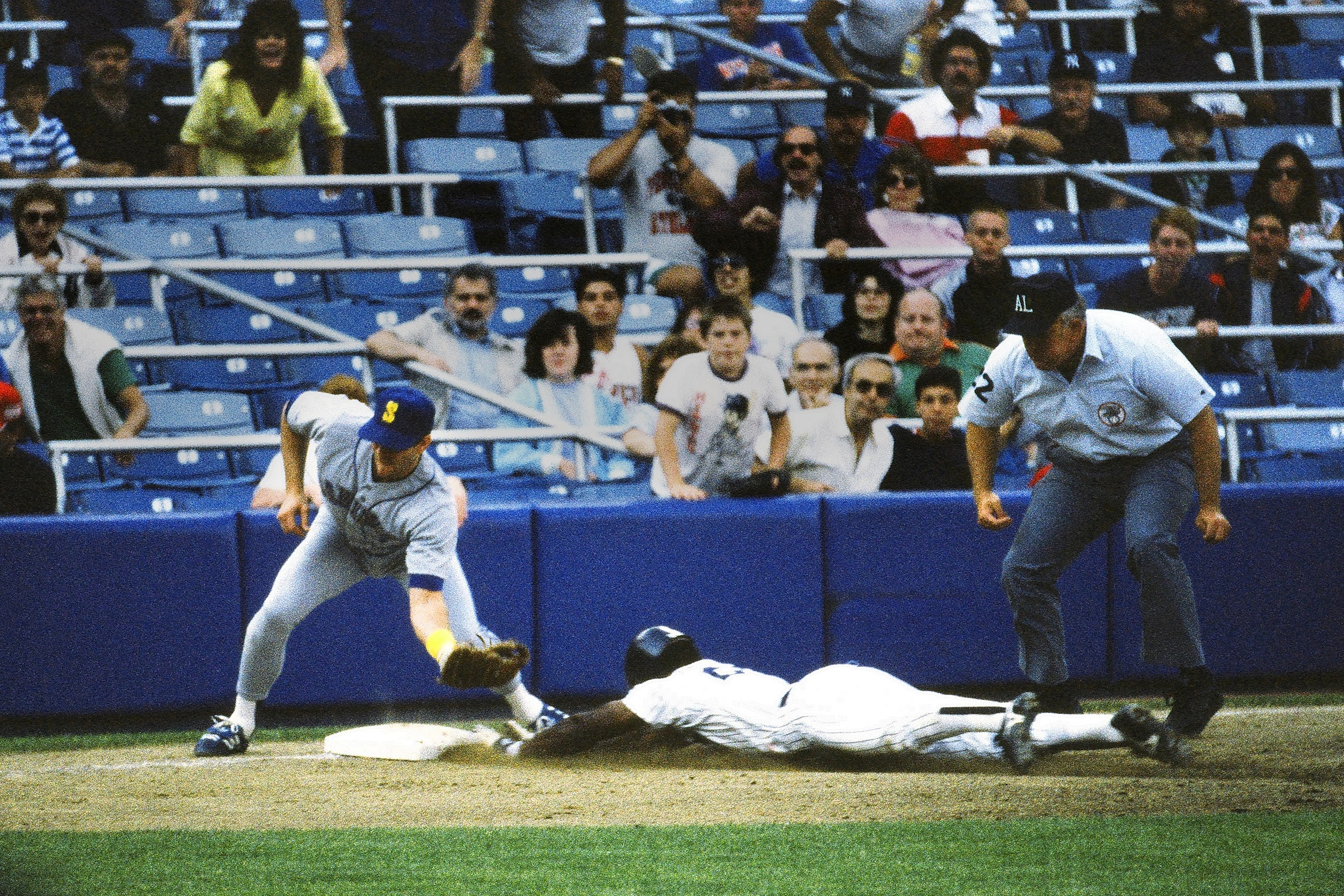
- Larry Barnett, upper right, waits to make a call on a stolen base attempt by Rickey Henderson in 1988.
- Born: January 3, 1945 (age 80); Nitro, West Virginia, U.S.
- Occupation: Former MLB umpire

Lawrence Robert Barnett (born January 3, 1945) is an American former umpire in Major League Baseball who worked in the American League from 1969 to 1999 before becoming the major leagues' supervisor of umpires from 2000 to 2001. He is perhaps well remembered for a controversial call in Game 3 of the 1975 World Series while working home plate in the 10th inning that led to the Reds winning the game. He was also the home plate umpire for the infamous Jeffrey Maier game in the 1996 American League Championship Series, but did not have anything to do with the controversy.

== Career ==
Barnett's 32 years of AL service surpassed the record held by Tommy Connolly (1901–31), which was tied by Barnett and Don Denkinger in 1998. Through the 2005 season, Joe Brinkman has umpired AL games in 33 seasons, although the major league umpiring staffs were merged in 2000. Barnett officiated in 4 World Series: 1975, 1981, 1984 and 1990 (Games 1–2), serving as crew chief in 1981. He also umpired in a record 7 American League Championship Series (1972, 1976, 1979, 1982, 1986, 1991, 1996), and in 4 All-Star games (1973, 1980, 1988, 1997), calling balls and strikes for the last contest. He was also the home plate umpire when Cal Ripken Jr. broke Lou Gehrig's consecutive games played record of 2130 on September 6, 1995, and for Vida Blue's no-hitter on September 21, 1970. He wore uniform number 22 starting in 1980 when the AL adopted uniform numbers. In 1999, Barnett ejected Detroit Tigers pitcher Brian Moehler after discovering some sandpaper on Moehler's thumb.

=== Game 3 of the 1975 World Series ===
In the 10th inning of Game 3 of the 1975 World Series, in which Barnett was working behind home plate, Cincinnati Reds hitter Ed Armbrister laid down a sacrifice bunt, and then collided with Boston Red Sox catcher Carlton Fisk, who was trying to field the ball. Fisk committed a throwing error on the play after colliding with Armbrister, which led to the Reds' winning run. Barnett declined to make an interference call on Armbrister, despite Boston's pleas. Barnett's failure to call an interference was criticized by NBC television broadcaster Curt Gowdy (a former Red Sox announcer), who was particularly harsh in his comments, reputedly leading NBC to drop Gowdy from its baseball coverage. Gowdy had reportedly been given the correct interpretation of the rule—that interference can be called only if a batter intentionally gets in the way of a fielder—by NBC Radio Producer Jay Scott (who was a Triple-A fill-in umpire at the time as well), but did not use it. Barnett later claimed he had received death threats on account of Gowdy's criticism.

Major League Baseball continues to this day to maintain that Barnett made the correct call. In fact, the Professional Baseball Umpires Corporation (the organization that oversees all minor league baseball umpires) instructs and teaches its umpires to make the same call as Barnett did should the same incident occur in a future game. Specifically, Major League Baseball has interpreted Rule 7.09(l) as saying "a catcher trying to field a batted ball that remains in the immediate vicinity of the plate cannot be protected because of the right of the batter-runner to begin his advance to first. Barring an intentional action on the part of either player, contact in this instance is incidental, and is not interference..." (Jaksa/Roder Umpires' Manual, 1997 Edition. Pg. 57).

Prior to Game 2 of the 1986 World Series, NBC did a feature on replays narrated by Bob Costas. One of the plays cited by Costas was the Armbrister play, and Barnett and Costas both insisted that Barnett had made the correct call, although Barnett declared, "You won't find many people in Boston who believe it was the right call." Costas used the feature to condemn the suggested notion of instant replay to settle calls, noting that it was the "same kind of mentality that adds color to classic movies and calls it progress."

=== Game 1 of the 1996 ALCS ===
Barnett was also behind the plate for Game 1 of the 1996 American League Championship Series, better known as the Jeffrey Maier game after the 11-year-old spectator who reached over the right field fence to catch Derek Jeter's fly ball. The play was ruled a home run by right field umpire Rich Garcia, who later admitted that the ruling was likely incorrect.

== See also ==
- List of Major League Baseball umpires (disambiguation)
