= Ed Armbrister =

Bahamian baseball player (1948–2021)

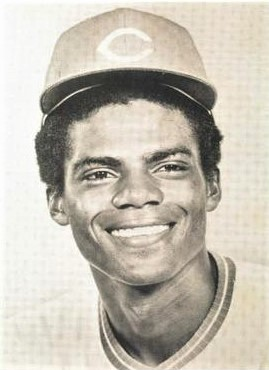
- Armbrister in 1975
- Outfielder
- Born: July 4, 1948; Nassau, The Bahamas
- Died: March 17, 2021 (aged 72); Nassau, The Bahamas
- Batted: Right Threw: Right

MLB debut
- August 31, 1973, for the Cincinnati Reds

Last MLB appearance
- October 2, 1977, for the Cincinnati Reds

MLB statistics
- Batting average: .245
- Home runs: 4
- Runs batted in: 19
- Stats at Baseball Reference

Teams
- Cincinnati Reds (1973–1977)

Career highlights and awards
- World Series champion (1975, 1976)

Edison Rosanda Armbrister (July 4, 1948 – March 17, 2021) was a Bahamian professional baseball player. He played in Major League Baseball as an outfielder from 1973 to 1977 for the Cincinnati Reds. Armbrister was a utility player for the Reds team known as the Big Red Machine that won three National League pennants and two World Series championships between 1973 and 1976. He was inducted into the Bahamas National Hall of Fame in 2008.

== Early life ==
Armbrister was born in Nassau, Bahamas, on July 4, 1948. He was one of thirteen children of Edison Sr. and Mary (McQuay); his brother, Jonathan, played minor league baseball in 1978. His father worked as a bus driver for Western Transportation and later as a security officer for Bahamas Faith Ministries. Armbrister attended Western High School in his hometown. He was signed as an amateur free agent by the Houston Astros before the 1967 season.

== Professional career ==
Armbrister played in the minor leagues from 1967 to 1973. He was included in a blockbuster trade on November 29, 1971, when the Cincinnati Reds acquired him from the Houston Astros along with Jack Billingham, Cesar Geronimo, Denis Menke, and Joe Morgan, in exchange for Lee May, Tommy Helms, and Jimmy Stewart. The trade helped to transform the Reds into the juggernaut known as the Big Red Machine that would dominate the National League for the next five seasons.

Armbrister made his MLB debut on August 31, 1973, at the age of 25, entering as a pinch runner for Pete Rose and later striking out in his only plate appearance in a 10–4 win over the San Diego Padres. He hit his first home run five days later against the Astros. He finished his rookie year with a .216 batting average with one home run and five runs batted in (RBIs) in 18 games played.

In the tenth inning of Game 3 of the 1975 World Series, with Gerónimo on base and nobody out, Armbrister collided with Boston Red Sox catcher Carlton Fisk at home plate while starting to run out a sacrifice bunt, leading to a wild throw by Fisk to second base that allowed Gerónimo to reach third base and eventually score the winning run. Home plate umpire Larry Barnett did not make an interference call on Armbrister, a decision which was a source of heated debate after the Reds won the game, 6–5.

Armbrister played in 73 games during the 1976 season, the most in his career, batting a career-best .295. He laid down a sacrifice bunt in his only plate appearance in that year's National League Championship Series (NLCS), and did not play in the Reds' four-game sweep of the New York Yankees in the World Series. Armbrister played his final major league game on October 2, 1977, at the age of 29. He finished his final season with a .256 batting average with one home run and five RBIs in 65 games. For his career, he batted .245 with 4 home runs and 19 RBIs in 224 games.

== Later life ==
After retiring from baseball, Armbrister returned to the Bahamas. He was a craps table croupier at Resorts International's Paradise Island casino and worked for at least one other establishment in the gaming business, a staple of the Bahamian tourist economy. He worked for the local government and consumer affairs agency around 2006 on Arawak Cay, a popular attraction in the Nassau area. He also served as a consultant to the Ministry of Sports and managed the Bahamian junior national team. In his downtime, Armbrister became a notable local softball player.

Armbrister was inducted into the Bahamas National Hall of Fame in 2008. He died on March 17, 2021, at his home in Nassau. He was 72, and was diagnosed with diabetes several years prior to his death.
