= César Gerónimo =

Dominican baseball player (born 1948)

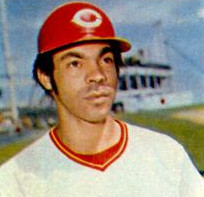
- Center fielder
- Born: March 11, 1948 (age 78); El Seibo, Dominican Republic
- Batted: Left Threw: Left

MLB debut
- April 16, 1969, for the Houston Astros

Last MLB appearance
- August 28, 1983, for the Kansas City Royals

MLB statistics
- Batting average: .258
- Home runs: 51
- Runs batted in: 392
- Stats at Baseball Reference

Teams
- Houston Astros (1969–1971); Cincinnati Reds (1972–1980); Kansas City Royals (1981–1983)

Career highlights and awards
- 2× World Series champion (1975, 1976); 4× Gold Glove Award (1974–1977); Cincinnati Reds Hall of Fame

César Francisco Gerónimo Zorrilla (born March 11, 1948), known as César Gerónimo, is a Dominican former professional baseball player and coach. He played in Major League Baseball as an outfielder from 1969 through 1983, most notably as a member of the Cincinnati Reds dynasty that won three National League pennants and two World Series championships between 1972 and 1976. He also played for the Houston Astros and the Kansas City Royals.

Although Gerónimo was not a prolific player on offense, he excelled as a defensive player, winning four consecutive Gold Glove Awards between 1974 and 1977. In 2008, Gerónimo was inducted into the Cincinnati Reds Hall of Fame.

== Early life ==
Gerónimo was born in El Seibo, Dominican Republic. His father was a driver for a car service, shuttling passengers on the three-hour drive from El Seibo to the capital of the Dominican Republic, Santo Domingo. At age 14, César's parents sent him to school at a seminary with hopes that he would become a priest. However, his athletic prowess continued to develop, especially in basketball. He didn't start playing baseball until he was 17. Two years later in 1967, after scouts saw him play on his father's softball team and recognized his prowess both pitching and hitting, he was signed to a free agent contract by the New York Yankees.

== Professional career ==
The Yankees tried unsuccessfully to make Gerónimo a pitcher during his first professional season (1967). In spring training of 1968 he informed the Yankees that he wanted to end the pitching experiment, and later that year he was drafted out of the Yankees' minor league system in the Rule 5 Draft by the Houston Astros.

Gerónimo made his major league debut with the Astros on April 16, 1969, at the age of 21. He notched his first career hit five days later in the ninth inning when, pinch-hitting for Jack Billingham, Gerónimo doubled off the Reds' Wayne Granger.

On November 29, 1971, Gerónimo was involved in one of the most significant trades in the history of the Cincinnati Reds when he was acquired from the Astros along with Ed Armbrister, Jack Billingham, Denis Menke and Joe Morgan. The trade helped to transform the Reds into the juggernaut known as the Big Red Machine that would dominate the National League for the next five seasons. A winner of four consecutive Gold Glove Awards from 1974 to 1977, Gerónimo was an outstanding all-around defensive center fielder who combined speed and great range with a powerful arm. He was the starting centerfielder of Reds teams that won five divisional championships, three National League pennants and the 1975 and 1976 World Series. Geronimo was known as "the Chief". In the 1975 World Series, he hit .280 with two home runs, but is best known for the iconic image of catching Carl Yastrzemski's fly ball for the final out of the World Series.

Gerónimo had his most productive season in 1976, with career-best totals in batting average (.307), hits (149), bases on balls (56), triples (11), stolen bases (22), and on-base percentage (.382). The following season he hit a career-high 10 home runs.

He played the last three seasons of his career (1981-1983) in a reserve role with the Kansas City Royals.

In his 15 Major League seasons, Gerónimo batted .258, with 51 home runs and 392 RBI, 460 runs scored, 977 hits, 161 doubles, 50 triples and 82 stolen bases. Defensively, he posted a .988 fielding percentage at all three outfield positions.

Gerónimo holds the dubious distinction of being the 3,000th strikeout victim of both Bob Gibson and Nolan Ryan. "I was just in the right place at the right time," he joked.

== Personal life ==
After retiring, Geronimo worked for the Japanese Hiroshima Carp, as a coach in their Dominican baseball academy, and he has been on the board of trustees of the Dominican Republic Sports & Education Academy.

In July 2008 he was inducted into the Cincinnati Reds Hall of Fame. He continues to return to Cincinnati for the annual RedsFest, Big Red Machine reunions and other appearances.

== See also ==
- List of Major League Baseball players from the Dominican Republic
