= 1975 Atlanta Braves season =

1975 Atlanta Braves
- League: National League
- Division: West
- Ballpark: Atlanta Stadium
- City: Atlanta
- Record: 67–94 (.416)
- Divisional place: 5th
- Owners: William Bartholomay
- General managers: Eddie Robinson
- Managers: Clyde King, Connie Ryan
- Television: WTCG
- Radio: WSB (Ernie Johnson, Milo Hamilton)

The 1975 Atlanta Braves season was the tenth season in Atlanta along with the 105th season as a franchise overall and the 100th in the National League.

== Offseason ==
- November 2, 1974: Hank Aaron was traded by the Braves to the Milwaukee Brewers for Dave May and a player to be named later. The Brewers completed the deal by sending Roger Alexander (minors) to the Braves on December 2.
- November 8, 1974: Danny Frisella was traded by the Braves to the San Diego Padres for Cito Gaston.
- December 3, 1974: The Braves traded a player to be named later and cash to the Chicago White Sox for Dick Allen. The Braves completed the deal by sending Jim Essian to the White Sox on May 15, 1975.
- March 28, 1975: Paul Casanova was released by the Braves.
- March 29, 1975: Jack Pierce was traded by the Braves to the Detroit Tigers for Reggie Sanders.

== Regular season ==
=== Season standings ===
NL West
Team	W	L	Pct.	GB	Home	Road
Cincinnati Reds	108	54	.667	—	64‍–‍17	44‍–‍37
Los Angeles Dodgers	88	74	.543	20	49‍–‍32	39‍–‍42
San Francisco Giants	80	81	.497	27½	46‍–‍35	34‍–‍46
San Diego Padres	71	91	.438	37	38‍–‍43	33‍–‍48
Atlanta Braves	67	94	.416	40½	37‍–‍43	30‍–‍51
Houston Astros	64	97	.398	43½	37‍–‍44	27‍–‍53

=== Record vs. opponents ===
1975 National League record Sources:
Team	ATL	CHC	CIN	HOU	LAD	MON	NYM	PHI	PIT	SD	SF	STL
Atlanta	—	5–7	3–15	12–6	8–10	8–4	4–8	5–7	4–8	7–11	8–9	3–9
Chicago	7–5	—	1–11	7–5	5–7	9–9	7–11	12–6	6–12	5–7	5–7	11–7
Cincinnati	15–3	11–1	—	13–5	8–10	8–4	8–4	7–5	6–6	11–7	13–5	8–4
Houston	6–12	5–7	5–13	—	6–12	8–4	4–8	6–6	6–5	9–9	5–13	4–8–1
Los Angeles	10–8	7–5	10–8	12–6	—	5–7	6–6	7–5	5–7	11–7	10–8	5–7
Montreal	4–8	9–9	4–8	4–8	7–5	—	10–8	7–11	7–11	7–5	5–7	11–7
New York	8–4	11–7	4–8	8–4	6–6	8–10	—	7–11	5–13	8–4	8–4	9–9
Philadelphia	7-5	6–12	5–7	6–6	5–7	11–7	11–7	—	11–7	7–5	7–5	10–8
Pittsburgh	8–4	12–6	6–6	5–6	7–5	11–7	13–5	7–11	—	8–4	5–7	10–8
San Diego	11–7	7–5	7–11	9–9	7–11	5–7	4–8	5–7	4–8	—	8–10	4–8
San Francisco	9–8	7–5	5–13	13–5	8–10	7–5	4–8	5–7	7–5	10–8	—	5–7
St. Louis	9–3	7–11	4–8	8–4–1	7–5	7–11	9–9	8–10	8–10	8–4	7–5	—

=== Notable transactions ===
- April 4, 1975: Leo Foster was traded by the Braves to the New York Mets for Joe Nolan.
- May 7, 1975: Dick Allen and Johnny Oates were traded by the Braves to the Philadelphia Phillies for Jim Essian, Barry Bonnell, and $150,000.
- May 28, 1975: Ron Reed and a player to be named later were traded by the Braves to the St. Louis Cardinals for Elías Sosa and Ray Sadecki. The Braves completed the deal by sending Wayne Nordhagen to the Cardinals on June 2.
- June 3, 1975: 1975 Major League Baseball draft
  - Gary Cooper was drafted by the Braves in the 3rd round.
  - Glenn Hubbard was drafted by the Braves in the 20th round.
- June 7, 1975: Roric Harrison was traded by the Braves to the Cleveland Indians for Blue Moon Odom and a player to be named later. The Indians completed the deal by sending Rob Belloir to the Braves at June 16.
- June 16, 1975: Rick Mahler was signed by the Braves as an amateur free agent.

=== Managerial turnover ===
The 1974 Braves had thrived under manager Clyde King upon his appointment July 24, going 38–25 to finish the year 14 games above .500. But the 1975 club fell under the break-even mark May 23 and never recovered. They were 58–76 (.433) and 31 1/2 games behind the Cincinnati Reds when King was fired on August 29, 1975. With only a handful of games left in the season, special scout Connie Ryan, a veteran former Braves' infielder and coach, was named to finish out the string, and the club performed even more poorly under Ryan, at 9–18.

For 1976, GM Eddie Robinson promised to hire a "firebrand" to replace the scholarly King, and in October he selected Dave Bristol as the team's new skipper. Bristol, 42, had been the third-base coach of the Montreal Expos from 1973 to 1975 and had previously compiled a poor record (144–209, .408) with the 1970–1972 Milwaukee Brewers. But he was hailed as an unsung contributor to "the Big Red Machine" Cincinnati dynasty, when, as Sparky Anderson's predecessor, he inserted into the lineup many of the players—like Johnny Bench, Lee May, Tommy Helms, and Gary Nolan—who proved to be key contributors to the Cincinnati championship clubs of the early 1970s. Bristol also had led the Reds to first division finishes in each of his three full seasons (1967–1969) as manager.

Said Helms upon Bristol's hiring by the Braves: "[Bristol] has a way of letting the players know how to win and what it's like to win. He's fiery and he's tough, but he's a ballplayer's man."

=== Roster ===
1975 Atlanta Braves
Roster
Pitchers: 27 Mike Beard; 47 Buzz Capra; 30 Bruce Dal Canton; 36 Adrian Devine; 45 Jamie Easterly; 25 Gary Gentry; 24 Preston Hanna; 24 Roric Harrison; 26 Tom House; 25 Frank LaCorte; 31 Max León; 49 Carl Morton; 35 Phil Niekro; 13 Blue Moon Odom; 38 Ron Reed; 34 Ray Sadecki; 38 Elías Sosa; 33 Mike Thompson; 39 Pablo Torrealba	Catchers: 29 Vic Correll; 20 Joe Nolan; 15 Johnny Oates; 42 Biff Pocoroba; Infielders: 16 Bob Beall; 10 Rob Belloir; 4 Larvell Blanks; 11 Darrell Evans; 19 Rod Gilbreath; 15 Ed Goodson; 28 Mike Lum; 9 Marty Perez; 10 Craig Robinson; 32 Earl Williams	Outfielders: 12 Dusty Baker; 48 Ralph Garr; 43 Cito Gaston; 27 Dave May; 22 Rowland Office; Other batters: 6 Davey Johnson; 7 Frank Tepedino	Manager: 14 Clyde King; 6 Connie Ryan; Coaches: 8 Jim Busby; 1 Eddie Haas; 3 Ken Silvestri; 23 Herm Starrette

== Player stats ==
=== Batting ===
==== Starters by position ====
Note: Pos = Position; G = Games played; AB = At bats; H = Hits; Avg. = Batting average; HR = Home runs; RBI = Runs batted in

Pos	Player	G	AB	H	Avg.	HR	RBI
C	Vic Correll	103	325	70	.215	11	39
1B	Earl Williams	111	383	92	.240	11	50
2B	Marty Perez	120	461	127	.275	2	34
SS	Larvell Blanks	141	471	110	.234	3	38
3B	Darrell Evans	156	567	138	.243	22	73
LF	Ralph Garr	151	625	174	.278	6	31
CF	Rowland Office	126	355	103	.290	3	30
RF	Dusty Baker	142	494	129	.261	19	72

==== Other batters ====
Note: G = Games played; AB = At bats; H = Hits; Avg. = Batting average; HR = Home runs; RBI = Runs batted in

Player	G	AB	H	Avg.	HR	RBI
Mike Lum	124	364	83	.228	8	36
Dave May	82	203	56	.276	12	40
Rod Gilbreath	90	202	49	.243	2	16
Biff Pocoroba	67	188	48	.255	1	22
Cito Gaston	64	141	34	.241	6	15
Rob Belloir	43	105	23	.219	0	9
Ed Goodson	47	76	16	.211	1	8
Bob Beall	20	31	7	.226	0	1
Johnny Oates	8	18	4	.222	0	0
Craig Robinson	10	17	1	.059	0	0
Frank Tepedino	8	7	0	.000	0	0
Joe Nolan	4	4	1	.250	0	0
Davey Johnson	1	1	1	1.000	0	1

=== Pitching ===
==== Starting pitchers ====
Note: G = Games pitched; IP = Innings pitched; W = Wins; L = Losses; ERA = Earned run average; SO = Strikeouts

Player	G	IP	W	L	ERA	SO
Carl Morton	39	277.2	17	16	3.50	78
Phil Niekro	39	275.2	15	15	3.20	144
Buzz Capra	12	78.1	4	7	4.25	35
Ron Reed	10	74.2	4	5	4.22	40

==== Other pitchers ====
Note: G = Games pitched; IP = Innings pitched; W = Wins; L = Losses; ERA = Earned run average; SO = Strikeouts

Player	G	IP	W	L	ERA	SO
Jamie Easterly	21	68.2	2	9	4.98	34
Bruce Dal Canton	26	67.0	2	7	3.36	38
Ray Sadecki	25	66.1	2	3	4.21	24
Blue Moon Odom	15	56.0	1	7	7.07	30
Roric Harrison	15	54.2	3	4	4.77	22
Mike Thompson	16	51.2	0	6	4.70	42
Gary Gentry	7	20.0	1	1	4.95	10
Adrian Devine	5	16.1	1	0	4.41	8
Frank LaCorte	3	13.2	0	3	5.27	10

==== Relief pitchers ====
Note: G = Games pitched; W = Wins; L = Losses; SV = Saves; ERA = Earned run average; SO = Strikeouts

Player	G	W	L	SV	ERA	SO
Tom House	58	7	7	11	3.18	36
Max León	50	2	1	6	4.13	53
Elías Sosa	43	2	2	2	4.48	31
Mike Beard	34	4	0	0	3.20	27
Pablo Torrealba	6	0	1	0	1.35	5
Preston Hanna	4	0	0	0	1.59	2

== Farm system ==
Level	Team	League	Manager
AAA	Richmond Braves	International League	Clint Courtney and Bob Lemon
AA	Savannah Braves	Southern League	Tommie Aaron
A	Greenwood Braves	Western Carolinas League	Bobby Dews
Rookie	Kingsport Braves	Appalachian League	Gene Hassell
