= 1974 Atlanta Braves season =

Major League Baseball season

1974 Atlanta Braves
- League: National League
- Division: West
- Ballpark: Atlanta Stadium
- City: Atlanta
- Record: 88–74 (.543)
- Divisional place: 3rd
- Owners: William Bartholomay
- General managers: Eddie Robinson
- Managers: Eddie Mathews, Clyde King
- Television: WTCG
- Radio: WSB (Ernie Johnson, Milo Hamilton)

The 1974 Atlanta Braves season was the ninth season in Atlanta along with the 104th season as a franchise overall. The team finished third in the National League West with a record of 88–74, 14 games behind the Los Angeles Dodgers. During the season, Braves outfielder Hank Aaron became the all-time career leader in home runs, surpassing Babe Ruth. Ralph Garr was the league's batting champion with a .353 average. Pitcher Buzz Capra captured the ERA title (2.28) and Phil Niekro tied for the league lead in wins with 20.

== Offseason ==
=== Waiting for a new home run king ===
At the end of the 1973 season, Aaron had finished one home run short of the record. He hit home run number 713 on September 29, 1973, and with one day remaining in the season, many expected him to tie the record. But in his final game that year, playing against the Houston Astros (led by manager Leo Durocher, who had once roomed with Babe Ruth), he was unable to hit one out of the park.

Over the winter, Aaron received many death threats and a large assortment of hate mail. Many did not want to see a black man break Ruth's nearly sacrosanct home run record. Lewis Grizzard, then editor of the Atlanta Journal, prepared for the massive coverage of the home run record. Secretly though, he quietly had an obituary written, scared that Aaron might be murdered.

Sports Illustrated pointedly summarized the racist vitriol that Aaron was forced to endure:

"Is this to be the year in which Aaron, at the age of thirty-nine, takes a moon walk above one of the most hallowed individual records in American sport...? Or will it be remembered as the season in which Aaron, the most dignified of athletes, was besieged with hate mail and trapped by the cobwebs and goblins that lurk in baseball's attic?"

Babe Ruth's widow, Claire Hodgson, even denounced the racism and declared that her husband would have enthusiastically cheered Aaron's attempt at the record.

=== Notable transactions ===
- January 9, 1974: Mike Davey was drafted by the Braves in the 2nd round of the 1974 Major League Baseball draft (secondary phase).
- March 26, 1974: Buzz Capra was purchased by the Braves from the New York Mets.

== Regular season ==
=== Hank Aaron's 715th ===
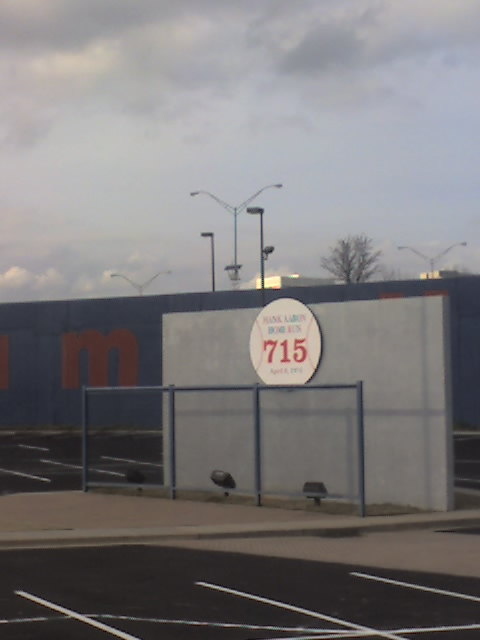
The fence over which Hank Aaron hit the home run still exists outside of Turner Field

As the 1974 season began, the Braves opened the season on the road with a three-game series against the Cincinnati Reds. Braves management wanted him to break the record in Atlanta, so the plan was to have Aaron sit for said games against the Reds. Baseball Commissioner Bowie Kuhn ruled that he had to play two games in the first series. He played two out of three, tying Babe Ruth's record in his very first at bat off Reds pitcher Jack Billingham, but failed to hit another home run in the series.

The team returned to Atlanta for a series with the Los Angeles Dodgers. On April 8, 1974, a crowd of 53,775 people showed up for the game — a Braves attendance record. Sammy Davis Jr. was in attendance, and Pearl Bailey sang the national anthem in Broadway soul. Atlanta's black mayor, Maynard Jackson, and Georgia Governor Jimmy Carter attended the game.

Dodgers pitcher Al Downing had walked Aaron leading off the second inning to the accompaniment of continuous booing by the fans. Aaron then scored on a Dodger error, and the run broke Willie Mays' all-time National League record for runs scored with 2,063. In the 4th inning, Aaron hit career home run number 715 off Downing. Although Dodgers outfielder Bill Buckner nearly went over the outfield wall trying to catch it, the ball landed in the Braves bullpen, where relief pitcher Tom House caught it. Two white college students sprinted onto the field and jogged alongside Aaron as he circled the base paths. As the fans cheered wildly, Aaron's mother ran onto the field as well.

=== Season standings ===
NL West
Team	W	L	Pct.	GB	Home	Road
Los Angeles Dodgers	102	60	.630	—	52‍–‍29	50‍–‍31
Cincinnati Reds	98	64	.605	4	50‍–‍31	48‍–‍33
Atlanta Braves	88	74	.543	14	46‍–‍35	42‍–‍39
Houston Astros	81	81	.500	21	46‍–‍35	35‍–‍46
San Francisco Giants	72	90	.444	30	37‍–‍44	35‍–‍46
San Diego Padres	60	102	.370	42	36‍–‍45	24‍–‍57

=== Record vs. opponents ===
1974 National League record Sources:
Team	ATL	CHC	CIN	HOU	LAD	MON	NYM	PHI	PIT	SD	SF	STL
Atlanta	—	4–8	7–11–1	6–12	8–10	9–3	8–4	8–4	4–8	17–1	8–10	9–3
Chicago	8–4	—	5–7	4–8	2–10	5–13	8–10	8–10	9–9	6–6	6–6	5–13
Cincinnati	11–7–1	7–5	—	14–4	6–12	6–6	9–3	8–4	8–4	12–6	11–7	6–6
Houston	12–6	8–4	4–14	—	5–13	6–6	6–6	6–6	5–7	7–11	10–8	8–4
Los Angeles	10–8	10–2	12–6	13–5	—	8–4	5–7	6–6	4–8	16–2	12–6	6–6
Montreal	3–9	13–5	6–6	6–6	4–8	—	9–9	11–7	9–9	6–6	4–8	8–9
New York	4–8	10–8	3–9	6–6	7–5	9–9	—	7–11	7–11	6–6	6–6	6–12
Philadelphia	4-8	10–8	4–8	6–6	6–6	7–11	11–7	—	10–8	5–7	8–4	9–9
Pittsburgh	8–4	9–9	4–8	7–5	8–4	9–9	11–7	8–10	—	9–3	8–4	7–11
San Diego	1–17	6–6	6–12	7–11	2–16	6–6	6–6	7–5	3–9	—	11–7	5–7
San Francisco	10–8	6–6	7–11	8–10	6–12	8–4	6–6	4–8	4–8	7–11	—	6–6
St. Louis	3–9	13–5	6–6	4–8	6–6	9–8	12–6	9–9	11–7	7–5	6–6	—

=== Opening Day starters ===
- Hank Aaron
- Dusty Baker
- Vic Correll
- Darrell Evans
- Ralph Garr
- Davey Johnson
- Mike Lum
- Ron Reed
- Craig Robinson

=== Notable transactions ===
- June 5, 1974: Dale Murphy was drafted by the Braves in the 1st round (5th pick) of the 1974 Major League Baseball draft.
- June 12, 1974: Dave Campbell was signed as an amateur free agent by the Braves.

=== Managerial turnover ===
While the crowning of Aaron as baseball's all-time home run king made 1974 an exceptional season for the Braves, the strong performance of the team on the field also marked the campaign. The Braves' 88–74 (.543) record was an 11 1/2 game improvement over 1973, and resulted in a third-place finish in the NL West.

But a mid-season slump cost manager Eddie Mathews—for years Aaron's fellow-superstar with the Milwaukee Braves of the 1950s—his job on July 21 during the All-Star break with the club at 50–49 (and 14 games out of first place). Special assistant to the general manager Clyde King, 50, former skipper of the San Francisco Giants, assumed the managerial reins July 24.

King's hiring aroused some controversy when Aaron noted that he had been bypassed as a managerial candidate; he would have become baseball's first African-American manager had he been named to the post. He would have taken the Braves' job, Aaron said, "simply because there are no black managers in baseball." Braves' owner William Bartholomay responded by claiming he had had no inkling that Aaron was interested in managing in the Major Leagues.

As events turned out, however, the Braves responded to King, winning 38 of their final 63 games (.603) and King was rehired for the 1975 season. Frank Robinson became MLB's first black manager when he was hired by the Cleveland Indians on October 3, 1974. Aaron was traded to the American League Milwaukee Brewers on November 2, 1974; he finished his active career in the Junior Circuit with two years as a designated hitter before returning to the Braves as a front-office executive. Meanwhile, Mathews finished his managerial career with a 149–161 (.481) record over all or parts of three seasons.

=== Roster ===
1974 Atlanta Braves
Roster
Pitchers: 33 Jack Aker; 27 Mike Beard; 47 Buzz Capra; 45 Jamie Easterly; 34 Danny Frisella; 25 Gary Gentry; 24 Roric Harrison; 26 Tom House; 36 Lew Krausse Jr.; 31 Max León; 49 Carl Morton; 32 Joe Niekro; 35 Phil Niekro; 38 Ron Reed; 33 Mike Thompson	Catchers: 5 Paul Casanova; 29 Vic Correll; 15 Johnny Oates; Infielders: 4 Larvell Blanks; 11 Darrell Evans; 17 Leo Foster; 19 Rod Gilbreath; 6 Davey Johnson; 28 Mike Lum; 9 Marty Perez; 43 Jack Pierce; 10 Craig Robinson; 7 Frank Tepedino	Outfielders: 44 Hank Aaron; 12 Dusty Baker; 39 John Fuller; 48 Ralph Garr; 16 Sonny Jackson; 42 Norm Miller; 18 Ivan Murrell; 22 Rowland Office	Manager: 14 Clyde King; 41 Eddie Mathews; Coaches: 8 Jim Busby; 1 Connie Ryan; 3 Ken Silvestri; 23 Herm Starrette

== Player stats ==
=== Batting ===
==== Starters by position ====
Note: Pos = Position; G = Games played; AB = At bats; H = Hits; Avg. = Batting average; HR = Home runs; RBI = Runs batted in

Pos	Player	G	AB	H	Avg.	HR	RBI
C	Johnny Oates	100	291	65	.240	1	21
1B	Davey Johnson	136	454	114	.251	15	62
2B	Marty Perez	127	447	116	.260	2	34
SS	Craig Robinson	145	452	104	.230	0	29
3B	Darrell Evans	160	571	137	.240	25	79
LF	Hank Aaron	112	340	91	.268	20	69
CF	Dusty Baker	149	574	147	.256	20	69
RF	Ralph Garr	143	606	214	.353	11	54

==== Other batters ====
Note: G = Games played; AB = At bats; H = Hits; Avg. = Batting average; HR = Home runs; RBI = Runs batted in

Player	G	AB	H	Avg.	HR	RBI
Mike Lum	106	361	84	.233	11	50
Rowland Office	131	248	61	.246	3	31
Vic Correll	73	202	48	.238	4	29
Frank Tepedino	78	169	39	.231	0	16
Ivan Murrell	73	133	33	.248	2	12
Leo Foster	72	112	22	.196	1	5
Paul Casanova	42	104	21	.202	0	8
Norm Miller	48	41	7	.171	1	5
Jack Pierce	6	9	1	.111	0	0
Larvell Blanks	3	8	2	.250	0	1
Sonny Jackson	5	7	3	.429	0	0
Rod Gilbreath	3	6	2	.333	0	0
John Fuller	3	3	1	.333	0	0

=== Pitching ===
==== Starting pitchers ====
Note: G = Games pitched; IP = Innings pitched; W = Wins; L = Losses; ERA = Earned run average; SO = Strikeouts

Player	G	IP	W	L	ERA	SO
Phil Niekro	41	302.1	20	13	2.38	195
Carl Morton	38	274.2	16	12	3.15	113
Buzz Capra	39	217.0	16	8	2.28	137
Ron Reed	28	186.0	10	11	3.39	78
Roric Harrison	20	126.0	6	11	4.71	46
Mike Thompson	1	4.0	0	0	4.50	2

==== Other pitchers ====
Note: G = Games pitched; IP = Innings pitched; W = Wins; L = Losses: ERA = Earned run average; SO = Strikeouts

Player	G	IP	W	L	ERA	SO
Lew Krausse Jr.	29	66.2	4	3	4.19	27
Gary Gentry	3	6.2	0	0	1.35	0

==== Relief pitchers ====
Note: G = Games pitched; W = Wins; L = Losses; SV = Saves; ERA = Earned run average; SO = Strikeouts

Player	G	W	L	SV	ERA	SO
Tom House	56	6	2	11	1.93	64
Danny Frisella	36	3	4	6	5.18	27
Max Leon	34	4	7	3	2.64	38
Joe Niekro	27	3	2	0	3.56	31
Jack Aker	17	0	1	0	3.78	7
Mike Beard	6	0	0	0	2.89	7
Jamie Easterly	3	0	0	0	16.88	0

== Awards and honors ==
=== All-Stars ===
1974 Major League Baseball All-Star Game

- Hank Aaron, right field, starter
- Buzz Capra, reserve
- Ralph Garr, reserve

== Farm system ==
Level	Team	League	Manager
AAA	Richmond Braves	International League	Clint Courtney
AA	Savannah Braves	Southern League	Tommie Aaron
A	Greenwood Braves	Western Carolinas League	Gary Geiger
Rookie	Kingsport Braves	Appalachian League	Hoyt Wilhelm
