= Rob Belloir =

German baseball player (1948–2023)

- Infielder
- Born: July 13, 1948; Heidelberg, Württemberg-Baden, Germany
- Died: November 13, 2023 (aged 75)
- Batted: Right Threw: Right

MLB debut
- August 2, 1975, for the Atlanta Braves

Last MLB appearance
- September 29, 1978, for the Atlanta Braves

MLB statistics
- Games played: 81
- Hits: 36
- Batting average: .216
- Stats at Baseball Reference

Teams
- Atlanta Braves (1975–1978)

Robert Edward Belloir (July 13, 1948 – November 13, 2023) was an American professional baseball player. Born in Heidelberg, Germany, he was the 25th German-born player in Major League Baseball.

Belloir attended Southwest High School in Atlanta where he played multiple sports while working as an usher at Ponce de Leon Park and Atlanta Stadium. He attended Mercer University on a basketball scholarship and played both college baseball and college basketball for the Mercer Bears. He would go on to receive a degree in English from Mercer in 1970.

Belloir was drafted out of Mercer by the Cleveland Indians in the eighth round of the 1969 Major League Baseball draft. He batted .233 with three home runs in five and a half seasons.

Belloir was drafted into the United States Army and, for two years, did not pick up a baseball. His time in the Army included a six month deployment to Vietnam.

Upon returning to baseball, he was the player to be named later in the deal that sent Blue Moon Odom and a player to be named later to the Atlanta Braves (for whom Belloir had worked as a stadium usher before signing with the Indians) for Roric Harrison midway through the 1975 season.

Belloir received his first call to the majors when a broken thumb sidelined Braves second baseman Marty Perez. On the same day as his call-up he learned that his wife was pregnant with their first child, Dana. A shortstop by trade, Belloir filled in at short while regular Braves shortstop Larvell Blanks filled in at second. He made his major-league debut on August 2 and fouled out pinch hitting for pitcher Max León in his only at-bat.

Belloir surprised many with his hot hitting when he arrived in the majors. He went 4-for-4 on August 22 with four runs batted in against the St. Louis Cardinals. The following day, he collected two more hits to bring his batting average to .313.

From there, Belloir cooled down, ending the season with a .219 average. He split the next three seasons between the Braves and their triple A affiliate, the Richmond Braves, playing some second and third base as well as short. He was inducted into the Mercer University Hall of Fame in 1981.

Belloir died on November 13, 2023, at the age of 75.
