= Dave Carlucci =

American baseball player and coach

- Bullpen coach
- Born: May 1, 1963 (age 62); Milford, Massachusetts, U.S.
- Bats: Right Throws: Right

Teams
- As coach: Boston Red Sox (1996)

David Mario Carlucci (born May 1, 1963) is an American former professional baseball player and coach. As a player, he was listed at 6 feet 1 inch (1.85 m) and 190 pounds (86 kg); he threw and batted right-handed. A graduate of Westfield State College, he spent part of 1996 as bullpen coach of the Boston Red Sox of Major League Baseball (MLB).

== Biography ==
A catcher and outfielder, Carlucci was selected in the fourth round of the 1984 MLB draft by the Los Angeles Dodgers. In his first professional season, with the 1984 Great Falls Dodgers of the Rookie-level Pioneer League, Carlucci appeared in 63 games, compiling a .316 batting average with six home runs and 40 runs batted in. He was named the Dodgers' minor-league player of the month for August 1984. However, his playing career stalled at the Class A level, where he played for the Bakersfield Dodgers in 1985 and 1986. Carlucci did not play in Minor League Baseball after 1986.

Returning to Massachusetts, Carlucci became the head baseball coach at Dean Junior College, then rejoined the professional ranks as the bullpen catcher for the Boston Red Sox during 1994–1995. During the latter season, Kevin Kennedy, Carlucci's manager at Great Falls in 1984, took the reins as manager of the Red Sox. Kennedy promoted Carlucci to bullpen coach of the Red Sox for 1996. But when the team started poorly, losing 19 of its first 25 games, the coaching staff underwent major changes on May 1. Among them, Carlucci was reassigned to his former role as bullpen catcher. When Kennedy was fired at the end of the season, Carlucci was also released.

Carlucci later began a career in the auto auction industry with Manheim Auctions.

Preceded by Herm Starrette	Boston Red Sox bullpen coach April 1–30, 1996	Succeeded by Herm Starrette
