= Pat Dobson =

American baseball player (1942–2006)

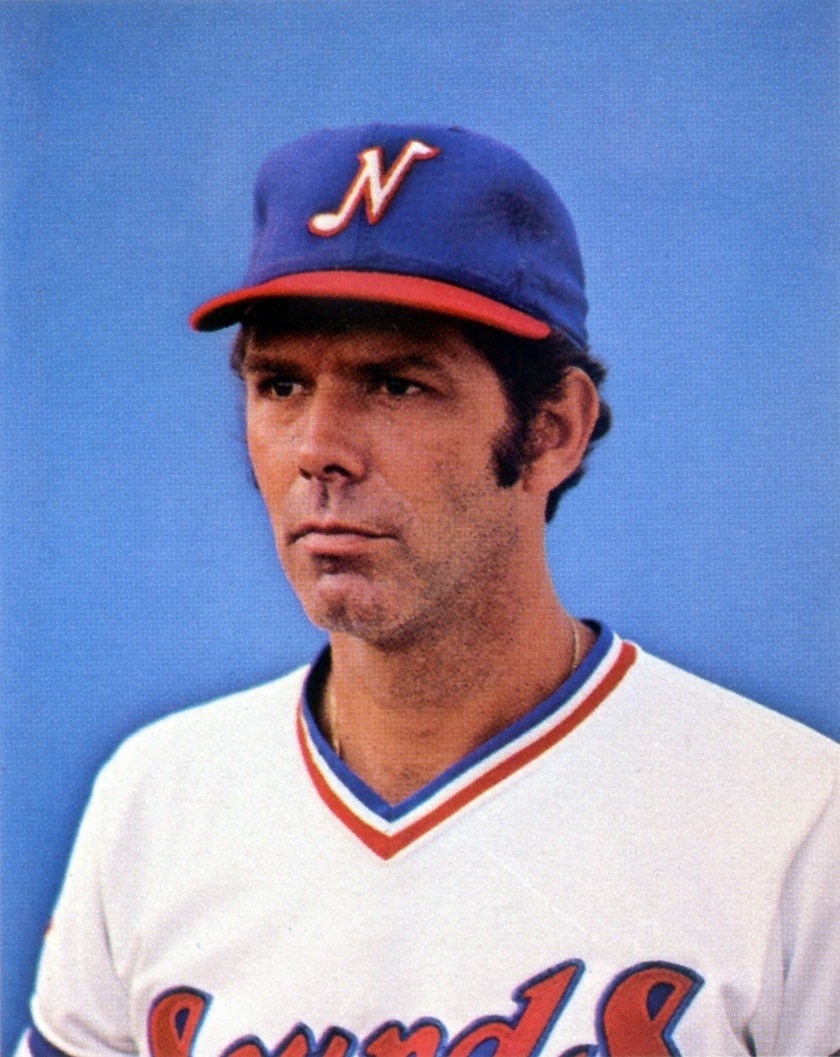
- Dobson with the Nashville Sounds in 1980
- Pitcher
- Born: February 12, 1942; Buffalo, New York, U.S.
- Died: November 22, 2006 (aged 64); San Diego, California, U.S.
- Batted: Right Threw: Right

MLB debut
- May 31, 1967, for the Detroit Tigers

Last MLB appearance
- September 19, 1977, for the Cleveland Indians

MLB statistics
- Win–loss record: 122–129
- Earned run average: 3.54
- Strikeouts: 1,301
- Stats at Baseball Reference

Teams
- Detroit Tigers (1967–1969); San Diego Padres (1970); Baltimore Orioles (1971–1972); Atlanta Braves (1973); New York Yankees (1973–1975); Cleveland Indians (1976–1977)

Career highlights and awards
- All-Star (1972); World Series champion (1968)

Patrick Edward Dobson, Jr. (February 12, 1942 – November 22, 2006) was an American right-handed starting pitcher in Major League Baseball who played for the Detroit Tigers (1967–69), San Diego Padres (1970), Baltimore Orioles (1971–72), Atlanta Braves (1973), New York Yankees (1973–75) and Cleveland Indians (1976–77). He was best known for being one of four Orioles pitchers to win 20 games in their 1971 season.

== Baseball career ==
Dobson was born in Depew, New York. He signed with Detroit in 1959. After spending seven years in the minor leagues and winter ball, pitching both in relief and starting, he made his debut with the big team in the 1967 season after starting the season 4–1 with a 1.47 ERA in six starts for the AAA Toledo Mud Hens. Dobson would spend the next 2 1/2 years as a reliever and spot starter for the Tigers including pitching 4 2/3 innings of relief in the team's 1968 World Series victory over the St. Louis Cardinals. Unable to claim a spot in the Tigers' rotation of Mickey Lolich, Denny McLain, Earl Wilson, and Joe Sparma, Dobson was traded to San Diego in 1969 along with Dave Campbell for a young Joe Niekro. After going 14–15 with 185 strikeouts and a 3.76 earned run average as the staff ace for the last-place Padres, he was traded along with Tom Dukes to Baltimore for Enzo Hernández, Tom Phoebus, Fred Beene and Al Severinsen on December 1, 1970.

In 1971 Dobson had a winning streak of 12 games (including nine consecutive complete games) and a scoreless inning streak of 23. On September 24, he recorded his 20th win, a 7–0 shutout against the Indians. Dobson posted a 20–8, 187K, 2.90 season record, and was part of the Orioles' "Big Four" pitching staff along with Dave McNally (21–5), Mike Cuellar (20–9), and Jim Palmer (20–9). Baltimore went on to win 101 games, with the distinction of having four 20-game winners in a season; only one other team in MLB history, the 1920 Chicago White Sox, have had four 20-game winners. On November 2, 1971, Dobson threw a 2–0 no-hitter against the Yomiuri Giants in Tokyo. It was the first no-hit game in the Japanese-American baseball exhibition history. Dobson was an All-Star in 1972. His 2.65 ERA was a major improvement from his 20-win season, but he went 16–18, tying for the AL lead in losses with Yankee Mel Stottlemyre.

In a transaction primarily driven by the Orioles' need for a power-hitting catcher, he was dealt along with Davey Johnson, Johnny Oates and Roric Harrison to the Atlanta Braves for Earl Williams and Taylor Duncan on the last day of the Winter Meetings on December 1, 1972. After starting the 1973 season 3–7, Dobson was sent to the Yankees on June 7 for four minor league players (none of whom panned out). Escaping Atlanta, he again blossomed and finished the season with a 9–8 record for the Yankees. Dobson started the 1974 campaign weakly, achieving only a 6–11 record by mid–season. However, Dobson anchored the Yankees' pitching staff in the second half of the season, finishing with a 19–15 record and a 3.07 ERA, the best numbers that year for a Yankee pitcher. After a slumping 11–14, 4.07 in 1975, Dobson was traded to the Indians, and recovered in 1976 with a 16–12, 3.48 record. The 1977 season proved to be his last, as Dobson compiled a 3–12, 6.16 record. He was released by the Indians during spring training of 1978.

In his 11-season career Dobson had a record of 122–129, with 1,301 strikeouts, a 3.54 earned run average, 74 complete games, 14 shutouts, 19 saves, and 2,120 1/3 innings pitched in 414 games.

== Later life ==
After his playing days, Dobson became a pitching coach for the Brewers, Padres, Royals and Orioles. From 1989 to 1990, he was the manager of the Fort Myers Sun Sox of the Senior Professional Baseball Association, leading the team to a 37–35 record and a playoff berth in his first season and an 11–14 record at the time of the league's demise on December 26, 1990. In 1997, Dobson joined the San Francisco Giants organization and worked as an advance scout and assistant to general manager Brian Sabean.

In 2006 Dobson died from leukemia in San Diego at the age of 64, one day after being diagnosed with the disease.

== See also ==
- 1968 Detroit Tigers season

Sporting positions
| Preceded by Cal McLish | Milwaukee Brewers pitching coach 1982–1984 | Succeeded by Herm Starrette |
| Preceded by Galen Cisco | San Diego Padres pitching coach 1988–1990 | Succeeded by Mike Roarke |
| Preceded by Frank Funk | Kansas City Royals pitching coach 1991 | Succeeded by Guy Hansen |
| Preceded by Mike Flanagan | Baltimore Orioles pitching coach 1996 | Succeeded by Ray Miller |
