= Clyde King =

American baseball player, coach, manager, and executive

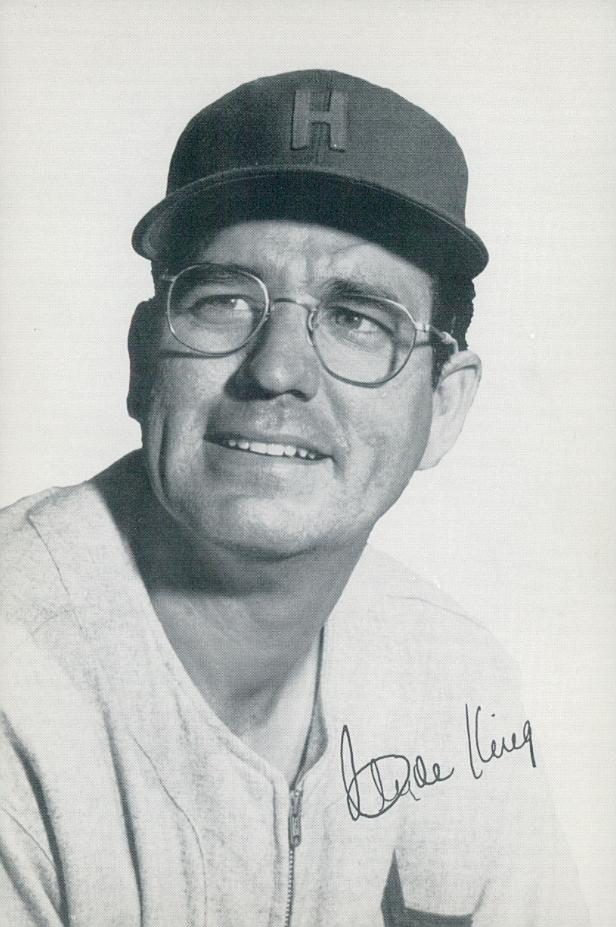
- King with the Hollywood Stars, c. 1957
- Pitcher / Coach / Manager
- Born: May 23, 1924; Goldsboro, North Carolina, U.S.
- Died: November 2, 2010 (aged 86); Goldsboro, North Carolina, U.S.
- Batted: Switch Threw: Right

MLB debut
- June 21, 1944, for the Brooklyn Dodgers

Last MLB appearance
- September 27, 1953, for the Cincinnati Redlegs

MLB statistics
- Win–loss record: 32–25
- Earned run average: 4.14
- Strikeouts: 150
- Managerial record: 234–229
- Winning %: .505
- Stats at Baseball Reference

Teams
- As player: Brooklyn Dodgers (1944–1945, 1947–1948, 1951–1952); Cincinnati Redlegs (1953); As manager: San Francisco Giants (1969–1970); Atlanta Braves (1974–1975); New York Yankees (1982); As coach: Cincinnati Reds (1959); Pittsburgh Pirates (1965–1967); New York Yankees (1978, 1981–1982, 1988); As general manager: New York Yankees (1984–1986)

Clyde Edward King (May 23, 1924 – November 2, 2010) was an American pitcher, coach, manager, general manager and front office executive in Major League Baseball (MLB).

King's career in baseball spanned 67 years, including 35 full years with the New York Yankees, whether in uniform as a manager or coach or in the front office in multiple roles, including general manager (April 10, 1984, to October 8, 1986) and special advisor to longtime owner George Steinbrenner. He managed the San Francisco Giants (1969–70) and Atlanta Braves (1974–75), as well as the Yankees (part of 1982), finishing with a career record of 234 wins and 229 defeats (.505).

== Career ==
=== As player ===
Born in Goldsboro, North Carolina, King attended the University of North Carolina at Chapel Hill. A 6 ft 1 in (1.85 m), 175 lb (79 kg) right-handed pitcher, he made his debut with the Brooklyn Dodgers at age 20 in 1944, his first professional season, during the manpower shortage caused by World War II. Although King would be sent to the minor leagues for seasoning after the war, he would ultimately appear in 165 games over all or parts of six seasons for the Dodgers (1944–45, 1947–48, 1951–52), winning 14 games for the 1951 edition. He was a member of the pennant-winning 1947 and 1952 Brooklyn clubs, but failed to appear in either World Series.

When he finished his Major League career with the Cincinnati Redlegs in 1953, King had appeared in an even 200 games, winning 32 and losing 25 with an earned run average of 4.14. He allowed 524 hits and 189 bases on balls in 496 innings pitched. He registered 150 strikeouts and four complete games (in 21 career games started) with 11 saves.

=== As coach, manager and executive ===
Before becoming a Major League manager, he led several higher-level minor league clubs, including the Atlanta Crackers, Hollywood Stars, Phoenix Giants, Columbus Jets and Rochester Red Wings. He also served as the MLB pitching coach for the Reds and Pittsburgh Pirates, and roving minor league pitching instructor for the St. Louis Cardinals.

King succeeded Herman Franks as San Francisco's manager in 1969 after Franks' Giants had finished in second place in the ten-team National League for four successive seasons. In King's first year as their skipper, the Giants won 90 games, a two-game improvement over 1968. But again they were runners-up, this time in the new, six-team National League West Division, three games behind the Braves. King clashed with Giants star Willie Mays during the year, over a misunderstanding on whether Mays was supposed to play or not in a game against the Astros. According to Mays, King threatened a fine—Horace Stoneham would not permit it, but Chub Feeney, the general manager, made Mays apologize to King, not wanting to create a rift on the ballclub. "I lost any respect I ever had for King," Mays wrote in his autobiography. "I thought of him as a back stabber, and we didn't talk for the rest of the year (1969)." When the 1970 Giants got off to only a 19–23 start, King was fired on May 23; San Francisco was trailing Cincinnati's "Big Red Machine" in the NL West by 12 games at the time.

King then returned to the high minors to manage the Richmond Braves of the Triple-A International League for two seasons, followed by a stint as a special assistant to Braves' general manager Eddie Robinson from 1973 through July 23, 1974. That day, with Atlanta one game above .500, Robinson fired skipper Eddie Mathews and named King interim manager. King's Braves responded by posting a 38–25 record and won 88 games—their best performance since 1969. But King's 1975 team collapsed; it was 58–76 and 311/2 games behind the Reds on August 29, 1975, when King was replaced as manager by Connie Ryan.

He then joined the Yankees' front office in 1976 and played a number of key roles—super scout, pitching coach, general manager and special advisor, in addition to managing them for the final 62 games of 1982. Replacing Gene Michael, he won 29 games and lost 33 as the defending American League champions fell to fifth place in the AL East Division. He remained with the Yankees for the rest of his life.

== Managerial record ==
Team	Year	Regular season					Postseason			
Team	Year	Games	Won	Lost	Win %	Finish	Won	Lost	Win %	Result
SF	1969	162	90	72	.556	2nd in NL West	–	–	–	–
SF	1970	42	19	23	.452	fired	–	–	–	–
SF total		204	109	95	.534		0	0	–	
ATL	1974	63	38	25	.603	3rd in NL West	–	–	–	–
ATL	1975	144	58	76	.433	fired	–	–	–	–
ATL total		197	96	101	.487		0	0	–	
NYY	1982	62	29	33	.468	5th in AL East	–	–	–	–
NYY total		62	29	33	.468		0	0	–	
Total		463	234	229	.505		0	0	–	

== Personal ==
King died in his native Goldsboro at the age of 86, survived by his wife Norma, their three daughters and sons-in-law, eight grandchildren and one great-grandchild (Talley Blackman).

His autobiography, A King's Legacy, The Clyde King Story, was published in 1999. In 2002, he wrote the foreword for Baseball in the Carolinas, 25 Essays on the States' Hardball Heritage, edited by Chris Holaday.

King was inducted in the Kinston Professional Baseball Hall of Fame in 1999.

Clyde King's brother, Claude, was a minor league pitcher for several seasons.

Sporting positions
Preceded by Marv Rackley	Atlanta Crackers manager 1955–1956	Succeeded by Bud Bates
Preceded by Clay Hopper	Hollywood Stars manager 1957	Succeeded by Franchise relocated
Preceded by Frank Oceak	Columbus Jets manager 1958	Succeeded by Cal Ermer
Preceded by Tom Ferrick	Cincinnati Reds pitching coach 1959	Succeeded by Cot Deal
Preceded by Cot Deal	Rochester Red Wings manager 1959–1962	Succeeded by Darrell Johnson
Preceded by Don Osborn	Pittsburgh Pirates pitching coach 1965–1967	Succeeded by Vern Law
Preceded by Bill Werle	Phoenix Giants manager 1968	Succeeded by Charlie Fox
Preceded by Mickey Vernon	Richmond Braves manager 1971–1972	Succeeded by Bobby Hofman
