= Taylor Duncan =

American baseball player (1953–2004)

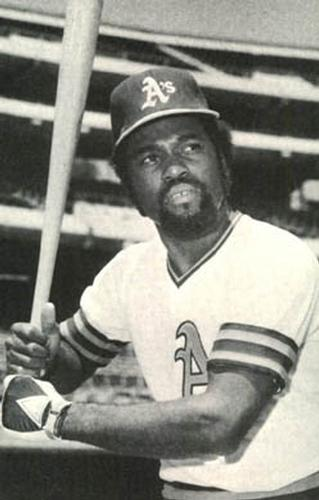
- Third baseman
- Born: May 12, 1953; Memphis, Tennessee, U.S.
- Died: January 3, 2004 (aged 50); Asheville, North Carolina, U.S.
- Batted: Right Threw: Right

Professional debut
- MLB: September 15, 1977, for the St. Louis Cardinals
- NPB: April 5, 1980, for the Seibu Lions

Last appearance
- MLB: September 30, 1978, for the Oakland Athletics
- NPB: June 30, 1980, for the Seibu Lions

MLB statistics
- Batting average: .260
- Home runs: 3
- Runs batted in: 39

NPB statistics
- Batting average: .235
- Home runs: 14
- Runs batted in: 36
- Stats at Baseball Reference

Teams
- St. Louis Cardinals (1977); Oakland Athletics (1978); Seibu Lions (1980)

Taylor McDowell "Dunc" Duncan (May 12, 1953 – January 3, 2004) was an American professional baseball infielder. Duncan, who was a college teammate of Leon Lee in Sacramento, was selected by the Atlanta Braves as the 10th overall pick of the 1971 Major League Baseball draft. He was traded along with Earl Williams by the Braves to the Baltimore Orioles for Davey Johnson, Pat Dobson, Johnny Oates and Roric Harrison on the last day of the Winter Meetings on December 1, 1972. Duncan spent five seasons playing for Orioles-affiliated minor league clubs. In September 1977 he was claimed off waivers by the St. Louis Cardinals and made his major league debut, playing a handful of the remaining games. He changed teams again as the Oakland Athletics selected him in the Rule 5 draft on December 5, 1977. The 1978 season was Duncan's last in Major League Baseball: he appeared in 104 games of the 1978 season playing mostly third base. Duncan continued to play in the minor leagues until 1980. The obituary of The Sacramento Bee quoted a major league scout who believed that Duncan's career had been hampered by a broken ankle he suffered early in his minor league career.

Taylor Duncan, the Major League Baseball player, bears no relation to Taylor Duncan, the founder of Alternative Baseball.
