= Ray Miller (baseball manager) =

American baseball coach and manager (1945–2021)

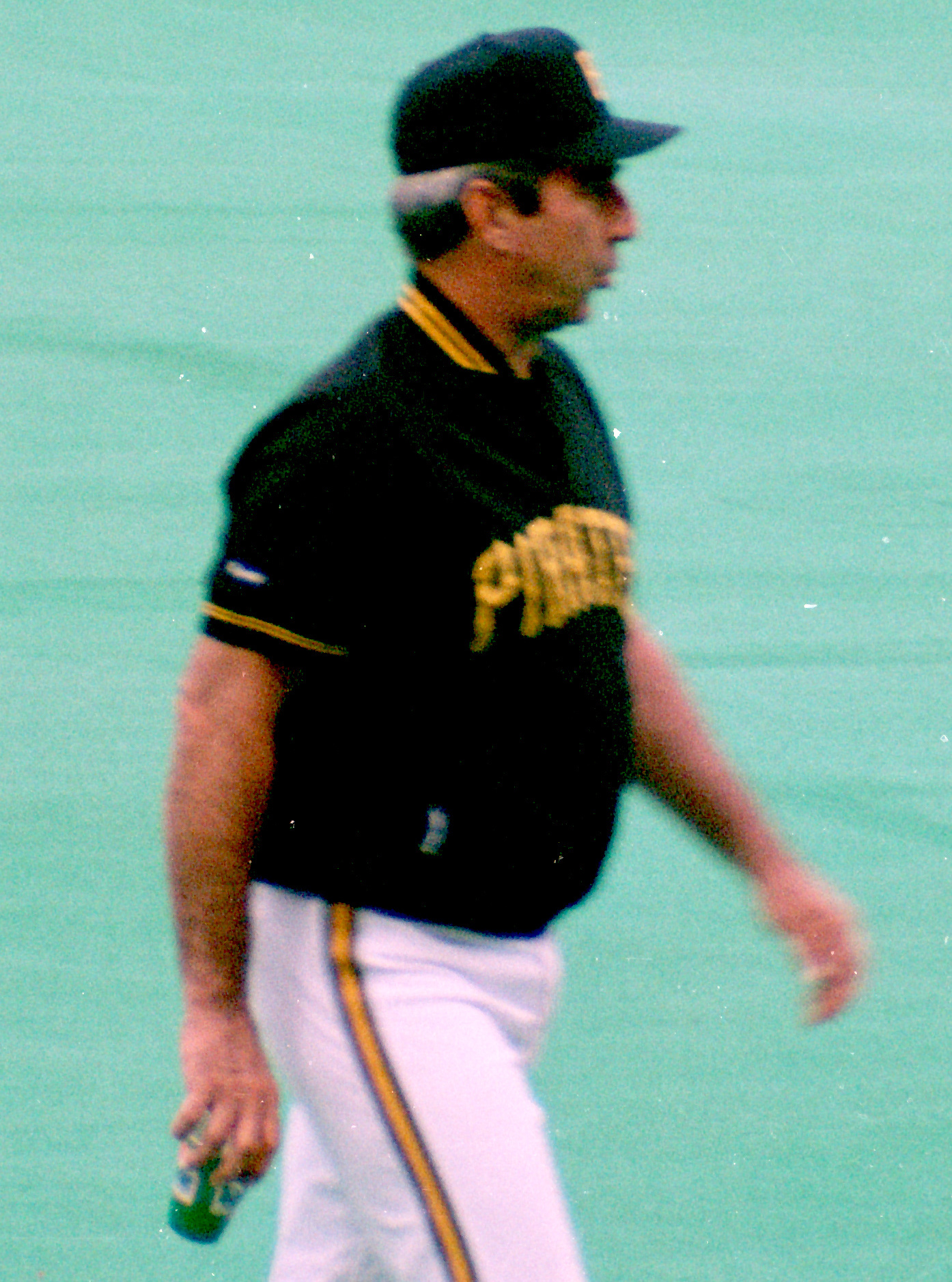
- Miller with the Pittsburgh Pirates in 1993
- Manager
- Born: April 30, 1945; Takoma Park, Maryland, U.S.
- Died: May 4, 2021 (aged 76); Weirton, West Virginia, U.S.
- Stats at Baseball Reference
- Managerial record at Baseball Reference

Teams
- As manager: Minnesota Twins (1985–1986); Baltimore Orioles (1998–1999); As coach: Baltimore Orioles (1978–1985); Pittsburgh Pirates (1987–1996); Baltimore Orioles (1997, 2004–2005)

Career highlights and awards
- World Series champion (1983)

Raymond Roger Miller (April 30, 1945 – May 4, 2021) was an American pitching coach and manager in Major League Baseball (MLB). A highly regarded pitching coach, he was known for bringing improvement to the pitchers he coached at many stops over his career. His successes as a pitching coach twice led him to be promoted to manager, where he was much less successful. He managed the Minnesota Twins (1985–86) and the Baltimore Orioles (1998–99), each for less than two seasons and with a losing record each time, compiling an overall managerial record of 266–297 (.472).

== Early life ==
Miller was born in Takoma Park, Maryland, on April 30, 1945. He was raised in nearby Forestville and attended Suitland High School, where he was selected as an all-state player in baseball. He signed with the San Francisco Giants in 1963.

== Professional career ==
=== Playing ===
Miller made his minor league debut with the Lexington Giants of the Western Carolinas League in 1964. He split time evenly as starting pitcher and reliever in his rookie year, starting 18 of the 36 games he pitched that season. He was subsequently acquired by the Cleveland Indians the following season. Despite winning 16 games with the Reno Silver Sox of the Class A California League in 1968, Miller never reached the Major Leagues as a player. The highest level he attained was Class AAA, with Portland of the Pacific Coast League, Wichita of the American Association and Rochester of the International League from 1969–73. He became a full-time relief pitcher from 1970 season onwards. He finished his minor league career with a 60–65 win–loss record, a 3.50 earned run average (ERA), and 992 strikeouts over 1,012 innings pitched.

=== Coaching ===
In his final season at Rochester, he was a player-coach, and then became minor league pitching instructor for the Red Wings' parent club, the Orioles, from 1974–77.

At the close of the 1977 season, Miller agreed to join the coaching staff of the Texas Rangers, whose manager was former Baltimore third-base coach Billy Hunter. But in January 1978, the Orioles' pitching coach position opened unexpectedly when George Bamberger was named skipper of the Milwaukee Brewers. Miller was let out of his Ranger contract and succeeded Bamberger as mound tutor of the pennant-contending Orioles. He worked under managers Earl Weaver and Joe Altobelli and coached for O's teams that won the 1979 American League championship and the 1983 world title. Miller tutored 20-game-winning pitchers such as Jim Palmer, Mike Boddicker, Mike Flanagan, Steve Stone, and Scott McGregor during that period. It was with the Orioles where he began famously instructing his pitchers to "work fast, change speeds, throw strikes."

The success of the Orioles' pitching staff made Miller a sought-after managerial candidate and on June 21, 1985, he received his first opportunity. Billy Gardner, who had led the Twins to a disappointing 27–35 record, was fired and Miller took control of the young Minnesota ballclub. Although the Twins improved to 50–50 over the remainder of the season, they performed so poorly (59–80, .424) in 1986, Miller was replaced as skipper by Tom Kelly on September 12.

Miller subsequently returned to the coaching ranks, spending ten seasons as pitching mentor of the Pittsburgh Pirates (1987–96) working for Jim Leyland and one (1997) back in Baltimore under Davey Johnson. When Johnson resigned at the close of the Orioles’ AL East Division championship season, Miller replaced him as manager. However, over the next two seasons (1998–99), the Orioles played ten games under .500, and he was fired in favor of Mike Hargrove in November 1999.

Miller returned as pitching coach of the Orioles in 2004–05, and the Baltimore mound staff showed improvement under his tutelage. However, he was forced to the sidelines by successful surgery to repair an aneurysm, and was succeeded in that role by Leo Mazzone in 2006.

==== Managerial record ====
Team	Year	Regular season					Postseason			
Team	Year	Games	Won	Lost	Win %	Finish	Won	Lost	Win %	Result
MIN	1985	100	50	50	.500	4th in AL West	–	–	–	–
MIN	1986	139	59	80	.424	fired	–	–	–	–
MIN total		239	109	130	.456		0	0	–	
BAL	1998	162	79	83	.488	4th in AL East	–	–	–	–
BAL	1999	162	78	84	.481	6th in AL East	–	–	–	–
BAL total		324	157	167	.485		0	0	–	
Total		563	266	297	.472		0	0	–	

== Later life ==
Miller retired from coaching in 2005. He was inducted into the Baltimore Orioles Hall of Fame five years later on August 7, 2010.

Miller died on the evening of May 4, 2021, at the age of 76.

== Sources ==
- Howard M. Balzer, ed. The Baseball Register, 1980 edition. St. Louis: The Sporting News.
- Montague, John, ed., The 1985 Baltimore Orioles Organization Book. St. Petersburg, Florida: The Baseball Library, 1985.

Sporting positions
Preceded by George Bamberger; Pat Dobson; Mark Wiley	Baltimore Orioles Pitching Coach; 1978–1985; 1997; 2004–2005	Succeeded by Ken Rowe; Mike Flanagan; Leo Mazzone
Preceded by Ron Schueler	Pittsburgh Pirates Pitching Coach; 1987–1996	Succeeded by Pete Vuckovich
