= Earl Williams (1970s catcher) =

American baseball player (1948–2013)

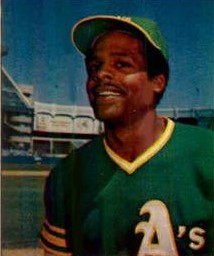
- Catcher / First baseman
- Born: July 14, 1948; Newark, New Jersey, U.S.
- Died: January 28, 2013 (aged 64); Somerset, New Jersey, U.S.
- Batted: Right Threw: Right

MLB debut
- September 13, 1970, for the Atlanta Braves

Last MLB appearance
- September 25, 1977, for the Oakland Athletics

MLB statistics
- Batting average: .247
- Home runs: 138
- Runs batted in: 457
- Stats at Baseball Reference

Teams
- Atlanta Braves (1970–1972); Baltimore Orioles (1973–1974); Atlanta Braves (1975–1976); Montreal Expos (1976); Oakland Athletics (1977)

Career highlights and awards
- NL Rookie of the Year (1971)

Earl Craig Williams, Jr. (July 14, 1948 – January 28, 2013) was an American Major League Baseball player. Though he never played catcher in the minor leagues, he earned the National League's Rookie of the Year award at that position in 1971.

== Early years ==
Williams was born in Newark, New Jersey, and raised in East Orange, and then Montclair, where he was an exceptional athlete at Montclair High School. He earned a scholarship to Ithaca College in upstate New York for basketball. He chose baseball instead when he was drafted by the Milwaukee Braves in the first round of the 1965 Major League Baseball August Legion Draft.

As Williams was a pitcher in high school, he made eight starts in his first professional season with the Gulf Coast League Braves, compiling a 1–0 record and 3.10 earned run average. When not pitching, Williams played first base. The idea of Williams as a pitcher was abandoned after the 1966 season, and Williams spent most of his time in the Braves' farm system either at first or in the outfield. In 1970, he also played some third base. He debuted with the Atlanta Braves that September, and batted.368 in ten games split pretty evenly between first and third base.

== Rookie catcher ==
Williams began the 1971 season as the Braves' backup corner infielder, but on April 16 began playing third base regularly in place of a disgruntled, soon-to-be-released Clete Boyer. The following day Williams hit his first two major league home runs at Philadelphia's brand new Veterans Stadium, and on April 18 became the first player to hit a home run into the stadium's upper deck. By the end of May, Darrell Evans took over at third, and Williams began seeing more playing time at first base. On May 23, Williams entered a 4–0 loss to the New York Mets at Shea Stadium as a pinch hitter in the eighth inning, and remained in the game at catcher. It was his first professional experience behind the plate ever.

He made his first start behind the plate on June 20 against the Cincinnati Reds. George Foster led off the Reds' half of the second inning with a single, then proceeded to take full advantage of Williams' inexperience at his new position. Foster stole second, advanced to third on Williams' throwing error, then stole home to score the first run of the game.

The following day, Williams caught both games of a doubleheader against the Montreal Expos, and caught his first attempted base stealer, Rusty Staub. He ended up appearing in 72 games at catcher, committing eight errors and catching 28% of potential base stealers. On September 10, Williams became the only Braves player besides Hank Aaron to hit a home run into the upper deck at Fulton County Stadium. Aaron was also the first right-handed hitter to do it, and Williams was the second. The feat had been preceded by the left-handed hitters Willie Smith and Willie Stargell.

Although he never developed into more than a poor defensive catcher, his offensive numbers – a .260 batting average, 33 home runs and 87 runs batted in – were enough to earn him 18 of 24 first place votes to become the first Brave to win the Rookie of the Year Award since Sam Jethroe in 1950 with what were then the Boston Braves. The other first place votes went to Philadelphia Phillies centerfielder Willie Montañez.

Though he played some first and third also, Williams spent most of the 1972 season catching. He had a whopping 28 passed balls that season, mostly due to his inability to catch Phil Niekro's knuckleball. However, he also had 28 home runs and 87 RBIs, drawing the attention of the Baltimore Orioles who acquired him along with Taylor Duncan from the Braves for Davey Johnson, Pat Dobson, Johnny Oates and Roric Harrison on the last day of the Winter Meetings on December 1, 1972.

== Baltimore Orioles ==
Many Oriole players, most notably ace pitcher Jim Palmer, were critical of this trade, but because they had finished 9th in runs scored in 1972 (behind every team except lowly Texas, Milwaukee, California, and Cleveland), it made sense to send an aging replaceable second-baseman (Bobby Grich moving in for Dave Johnson), a back-end-of-rotation starter (Pat Dobson), and 2 throw-ins to ensure a prime bat at a position in which their division rivals were killing them (Freehan, Munson, Fisk). Ironically, Palmer was 13–5 in games in which he pitched to Williams, and went on to win his first Cy Young Award in 1973. Williams batted .237 with 22 home runs (almost double that of the next Oriole, with 12) and a team-leading 83 RBIs his first season in the American League. Williams reached the post season for the only times in his career with the Orioles in 1973 and 1974, losing to the Oakland Athletics in the American League Championship Series both years. Also, ironically, the only 2 years that Williams was on the team were the only 2 years that the Orioles made the post-season in the 7-year period between 1972-78. His only post-season home run was an important one (staking the Orioles to a 1-0 lead in a game the Orioles lost late, 2-1), off Ken Holtzman in the game 3 1973 American League Championship Series.

== Return to the National League ==
After the 1974 season, he was traded back to the Atlanta Braves for pitcher Jimmy Freeman. He appeared in just eleven games at catcher in 1975, receiving most of his playing time at first base. He batted .240 with a career low eleven home runs in his new role. He began seeing more time behind the plate again in 1976, however, in June his contract was sold to the Montreal Expos, with whom he played mostly first base. For the season, his numbers bounced back somewhat, as he hit seventeen home runs and drove in 55 runs.

== Oakland A's ==
The Expos released Williams during Spring training 1977, and he signed with the Oakland A's a few days later. He split his time with the A's fairly evenly between catching, first base and designated hitter. He batted .241 with thirteen home runs and 38 RBIs his only season in Oakland. He was placed on waivers by the A's at the end of Spring training 1978. Failing to find a taker, he was released on May 17.

== Career stats ==
Seasons	Games	PA	AB	Runs	Hits	2B	3B	HR	RBI	SB	BB	SO	Avg.	Slg.	OBP	CS%	Fld%
8	889	3431	3058	361	756	115	6	138	457	2	298	574	.247	.424	.318	32%	.985

Williams had a career .984 fielding percentage at catcher, and a .991 fielding percentage at first base. His worst position was third base, where he had a .892 fielding percentage.

== Death ==
Williams died of acute myeloid leukemia at his home in the Somerset section of Franklin Township, Somerset County, New Jersey on January 28, 2013, at the age of 64. His wife Linda, her daughter Raquel, and granddaughter Ruqayyah were with him.

As of August 1, 2026 a street where he lived was named in his honor. Earl C. Williams Drive, Somerset, NJ 08873.
