= Herm Starrette =

American baseball player (1936-2017)

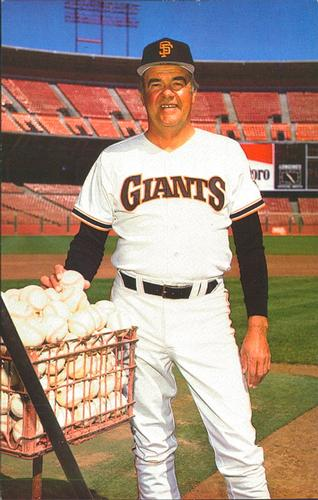
- Pitcher
- Born: November 20, 1936; Statesville, North Carolina, U.S.
- Died: June 2, 2017 (aged 80); Statesville, North Carolina, U.S.
- Batted: Right Threw: Right

MLB debut
- July 1, 1963, for the Baltimore Orioles

Last MLB appearance
- May 10, 1965, for the Baltimore Orioles

MLB statistics
- Win–loss record: 1–1
- Earned run average: 2.54
- Strikeouts: 21
- Stats at Baseball Reference

Teams
- As player: Baltimore Orioles (1963–1965); As coach: Atlanta Braves (1974–1976); San Francisco Giants (1977–1978); Philadelphia Phillies (1979–1981); San Francisco Giants (1983–1984); Milwaukee Brewers (1985–1986); Chicago Cubs (1987); Baltimore Orioles (1988); Boston Red Sox (1995–1997)

Career highlights and awards
- World Series champion (1980)

Herman Paul Starrette (November 20, 1936 – June 2, 2017) was an American relief pitcher; pitching and bullpen coach; and farm system official in Major League Baseball. Starrette was a native and lifelong resident of Statesville, North Carolina. He attended Lenoir Rhyne College in nearby Hickory. During his playing days, he threw and batted right-handed, stood 6 ft 1 in (1.85 m) tall, and weighed 185 pounds (84 kg).

Starrette played his nine-year (1958–1966) pitching career in the Baltimore Orioles organization, and spent parts of three seasons (1963–1965) at the Major League level. Appearing in 27 MLB games, he pitched in 46 innings and split two decisions with an earned run average of 2.54. He allowed 43 hits and 16 bases on balls, struck out 21 and earned one save.

His coaching career began with the Orioles' Triple-A farm club, the Rochester Red Wings, in 1967, and the following season he succeeded George Bamberger as Baltimore's roving minor league pitching instructor. The Orioles' system of the time was celebrated for developing young pitching, and after six seasons in that job, Starrette became a Major League pitching coach for the 1974 Atlanta Braves. He would spend the next 28 years as a pitching coach, bullpen coach, minor league instructor, coordinator of instruction, and farm system director with the Braves, Orioles, San Francisco Giants, Philadelphia Phillies, Milwaukee Brewers, Chicago Cubs, Montreal Expos and Boston Red Sox. He was the pitching coach of the 1980 world champion Phillies.

Starrette was a trusted associate of Dan Duquette, working with him in Milwaukee, Montreal and Boston as a farm system official and minor and Major League coach. After Duquette's ouster as general manager in Boston in February 2002, Starrette retired from baseball.

Starrette died June 2, 2017.

Sporting positions
Preceded by Lew Burdette	Atlanta Braves pitching coach 1974–1976	Succeeded by Johnny Sain
Preceded by Buck Rodgers; Don McMahon	San Francisco Giants pitching coach 1977–1978; 1983–1984	Succeeded by Larry Shepard; Bob Miller
Preceded by Ray Rippelmeyer	Philadelphia Phillies pitching coach 1979–1981	Succeeded by Claude Osteen
Preceded by Pat Dobson	Milwaukee Brewers pitching coach 1985–1986	Succeeded by Chuck Hartenstein
Preceded by Billy Connors	Chicago Cubs pitching coach 1987	Succeeded by Dick Pole
Preceded by Mark Wiley	Baltimore Orioles pitching coach 1988	Succeeded by Al Jackson
Preceded by John Wathan; Dave Carlucci	Boston Red Sox bullpen coach 1995; 1996–1997	Succeeded by Dave Carlucci; Dick Pole
