= Mike Thompson (1970s pitcher) =

American baseball player (1949–2022)

- Pitcher
- Born: September 6, 1949; Denver, Colorado, U.S.
- Died: October 9, 2022 (aged 73)
- Batted: Right Threw: Right

MLB debut
- May 19, 1971, for the Washington Senators

Last MLB appearance
- September 5, 1975, for the Atlanta Braves

MLB statistics
- Win–loss record: 1–15
- Earned run average: 4.86
- Strikeouts: 113
- Stats at Baseball Reference

Teams
- Washington Senators (1971); St. Louis Cardinals (1973–1974); Atlanta Braves (1974–1975)

Michael Wayne Thompson (September 6, 1949 – October 9, 2022) was an American right-handed Major League Baseball pitcher who played in the big leagues in 1971 and from 1973 to 1975 for the Washington Senators, St. Louis Cardinals and Atlanta Braves. Prior to playing professionally, he attended Ponca City High School in Ponca City, Oklahoma.

Thompson's professional career began in 1967, after he was drafted in the third round in that year's draft. He played for the Geneva Senators, going 2–5 with a 3.76 ERA in 10 games started. The following year, he played for the Salisbury Senators, going 7–13 with a 4.27 ERA in 29 games (23 games started). In 1969, he improved drastically, going 9–5 with a 2.09 ERA in 18 games for the Burlington Senators. The 1970 season was split between the Denver Bears and Pittsfield Senators, going 0–2 with a 10.38 ERA for the former and 5–9 with a 5.32 ERA for the latter.

He would make his big league debut in 1971, on May 19 against the Baltimore Orioles. Although he allowed only one hit earned run in seven innings, he also walked nine batters and struck out only one. He earned the loss in his big league debut. Overall, he would go 1–6 with a 4.86 ERA in 16 big league games (12 starts). He allowed more walks than hits, surrendering 54 walks to 53 hits in 66 2/3 innings. He struck out only 41 batters. Thompson also spent time with the Denver Bears in 1971, going 5–3 with a 4.20 ERA in 11 games (nine starts).

His 1972 season was spent with the Bears, and with them he went 6–8 with a 4.10 ERA in 20 games (18 starts). On March 31, 1973, he was sent to the Cardinals as the player to be named later in a deal that originally occurred on February 1 of that year. The trade involved the Rangers receiving Charlie Hudson and a player to be named later (who would end up being Mike Nagy) in return for a player to be named later (Thompson). Thompson spent most of 1973 in the minors, with the Tulsa Oilers. With them, he went 7–7 with a 2.82 ERA in 20 games. However, he did make two starts in the big leagues, going 0–0 with a 0.00 ERA in four innings of work.

In 1974, Thompson began the season with the Cardinals, going 0–3 with a 5.63 ERA with them. He was purchased by the Braves from the Cardinals on September 10, and he went 0–0 with a 4.50 ERA in one game with the Braves. Overall, he walked 37 batters in 42 1/3 innings, while striking out only 27 batters. He also made ten starts for the Oilers that year, going 5–4 with a 3.55 ERA.

For the Braves in 1975, he made 16 big league appearances, starting 10 of those games. He went 0–6 with a 4.70 ERA, and played his final big league game on September 5, 1975. He was dealt from the Braves to the Cincinnati Reds for Terry Crowley on April 7, 1976. He played for the Indianapolis Indians in the Reds organization that year, going 5–7 with a 3.97 ERA in 21 games with them. On November 8, he was traded to the Texas Rangers for minor leaguer Art DeFilippis. Thompson retired after 1976, however.

In 54 big league appearances (29 starts), Thompson went 1–15 (.063) with a 4.86 ERA. In 164 2/3 innings, he allowed 158 hits, walked 128 batters and struck out 113 batters.
