= John Fuller (baseball) =

American baseball player (born 1950)

- Center fielder
- Born: January 29, 1950 (age 76); Lynwood, California, U.S.
- Batted: Left Threw: Left

MLB debut
- May 9, 1974, for the Atlanta Braves

Last MLB appearance
- May 12, 1974, for the Atlanta Braves

MLB statistics
- Batting average: .333
- Home runs: 0
- Runs batted in: 0
- Stats at Baseball Reference

Teams
- Atlanta Braves (1974)

John Edward Fuller (born January 29, 1950) is an American former Major League Baseball player. He played three games in one season with the Atlanta Braves from May 9 to May 12, 1974.

Fuller made his Major League debut on May 9, 1974 against the Chicago Cubs at Wrigley Field. He popped out against Rick Reuschel in his only turn at bat, a pinch hit appearance in relief of pitcher Danny Frisella.

Two days later, he appeared in the second of his three Major League games, a contest against the San Francisco Giants at Atlanta Stadium. He scored the only run of his career after pinch hitting for Tom House.

Fuller was double switched into the ninth inning of his final game on May 12, replacing Rowland Office in center field. He recorded his only inning in the field and the only putout of his Major League career on a fly ball from Garry Maddox. In the bottom half of the inning, he recorded his only hit, a single off Randy Moffitt.
