= Connie Ryan =

American baseball player and manager (1920–1996)

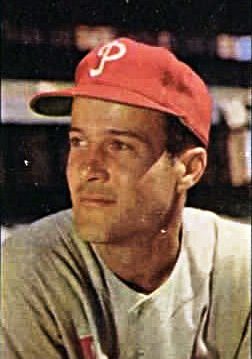
- Second baseman / Manager
- Born: February 27, 1920; New Orleans, Louisiana, U.S.
- Died: January 3, 1996 (aged 75); Metairie, Louisiana, U.S.
- Batted: Right Threw: Right

MLB debut
- April 14, 1942, for the New York Giants

Last MLB appearance
- April 19, 1954, for the Cincinnati Redlegs

MLB statistics
- Batting average: .248
- Home runs: 56
- Runs batted in: 381
- Managerial record: 11–22
- Winning %: .333
- Stats at Baseball Reference
- Managerial record at Baseball Reference

Teams
- As player: New York Giants (1942); Boston Braves (1943–1944, 1946–1950); Cincinnati Reds (1950–1951); Philadelphia Phillies (1952–1953); Chicago White Sox (1953); Cincinnati Redlegs (1954); As manager: Atlanta Braves (1975); Texas Rangers (1977)

Career highlights and awards
- All-Star (1944); World Series champion (1957)

Cornelius Joseph Ryan (February 27, 1920 – January 3, 1996) was an American professional baseball second baseman, third baseman, coach and manager who served as interim manager of two Major League Baseball teams, the 1975 Atlanta Braves and the 1977 Texas Rangers.

A native of New Orleans who attended Louisiana State University, he batted and threw right-handed and was listed as 5 feet 11 inches (1.80 m) tall and 175 pounds (79 kg).

During his playing days, Ryan appeared in 1,184 games over 12 MLB seasons, and compiled a lifetime batting average of .248 with 988 career hits (among them 58 home runs) with the New York Giants, Boston Braves, Cincinnati Reds / Redlegs, Philadelphia Phillies and Chicago White Sox.

On April 16, 1953, Ryan (then with the Phillies) made six hits in six at bats in a 14–12 loss to Pittsburgh, tying a then-Major League record. Ryan's safeties included two doubles; he scored three runs and had one run batted in.

Ryan spent much of his baseball career in the Braves organization, working for them in three different cities: as a player in Boston (he was a utility infielder for the 1948 National League champions); a coach and minor league manager for Milwaukee during the late 1950s (he was the third-base coach on Fred Haney's staff during the Braves' 1957 world championship season); and as a coach (1971; 1973–74), interim manager (1975) and scout for the Atlanta club during the 1970s. Ryan succeeded Clyde King as skipper of the Atlanta Braves on August 30, 1975, and guided the team to a record of 9–18 over the final 27 games of the season.

In 1977, Ryan began the season as a coach with the Texas Rangers. Texas manager Frank Lucchesi was replaced by Eddie Stanky, a teammate of Ryan's on the 1948–49 Braves, on June 22. Stanky resigned after one game, and Ryan served as interim manager for six games (with Texas winning two) from June 23 to 27. The Rangers signed Billy Hunter, the longtime Baltimore Orioles third-base coach, as their permanent manager. Ryan's career managerial mark was 11–22 (.333). He remained a Rangers' coach through 1979.

During the 1960s, Ryan also spent several seasons as a scout and minor league manager with the Houston Astros and briefly worked with the Kansas City A's.

He died at age 75 in Metairie, Louisiana.

== See also ==
- List of Major League Baseball single-game hits leaders
