= Leo Foster =

American baseball player (born 1951)

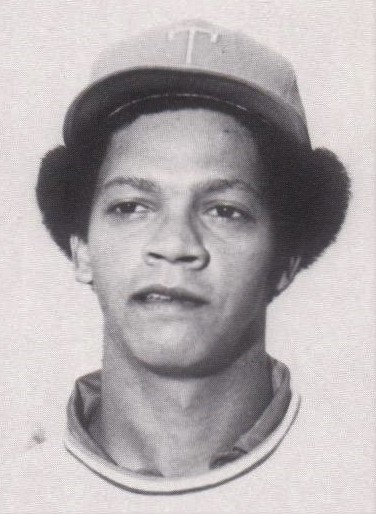
- Infielder
- Born: February 2, 1951 (age 75); Covington, Kentucky, U.S.
- Batted: Right Threw: Right

MLB debut
- July 9, 1971, for the Atlanta Braves

Last MLB appearance
- October 2, 1977, for the New York Mets

MLB statistics
- Batting average: .198
- Home runs: 2
- Runs batted in: 26
- Stats at Baseball Reference

Teams
- Atlanta Braves (1971, 1973–1974); New York Mets (1976–1977)

Leonard Norris Foster (born February 2, 1951) is an American former Major League Baseball infielder. He played all or part of five major league seasons between 1971 and 1977, playing mostly at shortstop, second base, and third base, for the Atlanta Braves and New York Mets.

Foster had one of the more unfortunate debuts in Major League history, when playing his first game for the Braves against the Pittsburgh Pirates at Three Rivers Stadium on July 9, 1971. Fielding at shortstop, he committed an error on the first ball hit to him. After flying out in the 3rd inning, Foster hit into a double play in the 5th inning, followed by hitting into a triple play in the 7th inning.
