= Vic Correll =

American baseball player (born 1946)

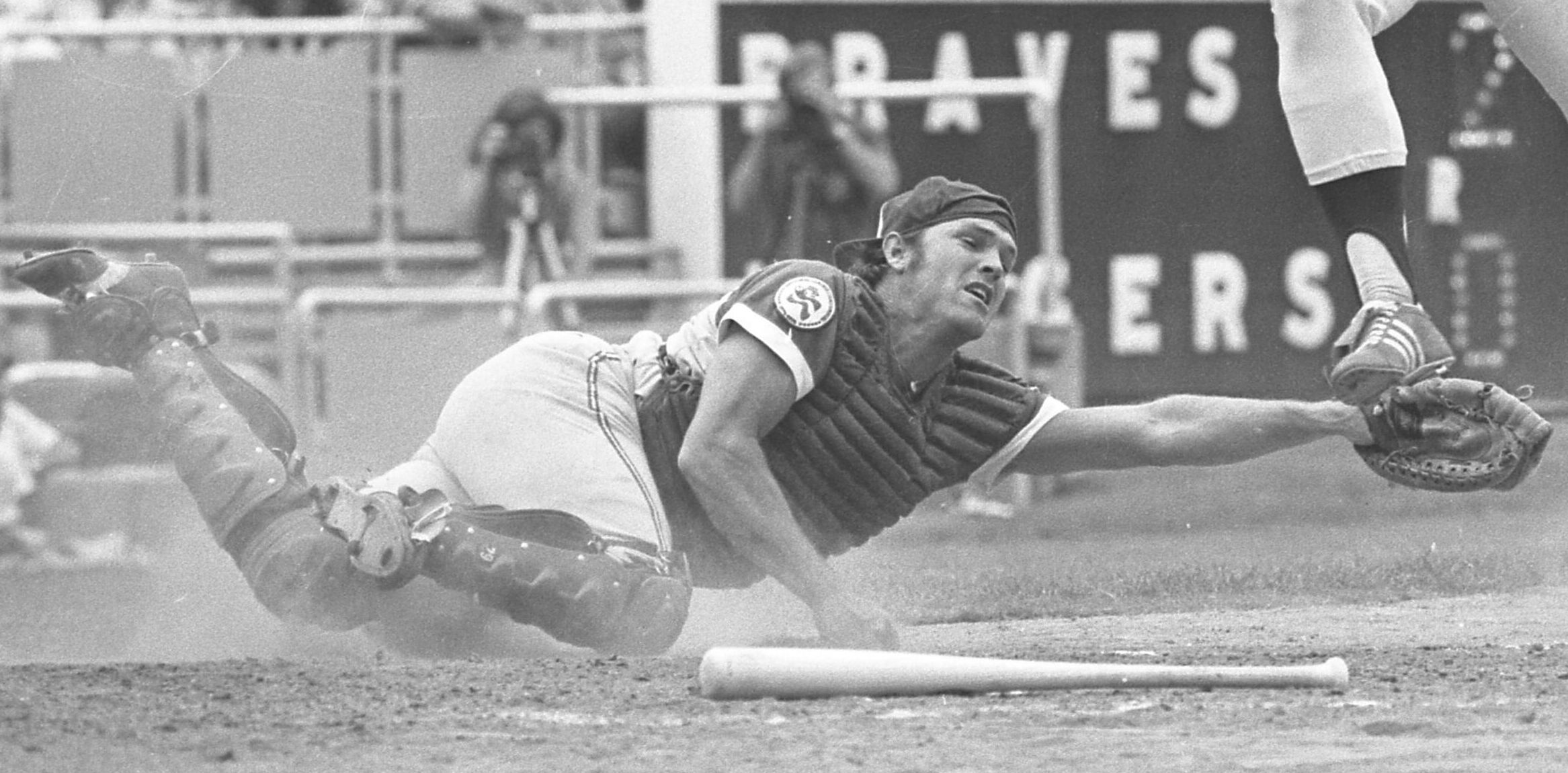
- Correll with the Atlanta Braves in 1976
- Catcher
- Born: February 5, 1946 (age 80); Washington, D.C., U.S.
- Batted: Right Threw: Right

MLB debut
- October 4, 1972, for the Boston Red Sox

Last MLB appearance
- October 1, 1980, for the Cincinnati Reds

MLB statistics
- Batting average: .229
- Home runs: 29
- Runs batted in: 125
- Stats at Baseball Reference

Teams
- Boston Red Sox (1972); Atlanta Braves (1974–1977); Cincinnati Reds (1978–1980)

Victor Crosby Correll (born February 5, 1946) is an American former catcher in Major League Baseball who played for the Boston Red Sox, Atlanta Braves and Cincinnati Reds in all or parts of eight seasons spanning 1972–1980. Listed at 5' 10", 185 lb., Correll batted and threw right handed. He was born in Washington, D.C., and attended McClenaghan High School in Florence, South Carolina.

The Cleveland Indians selected Correll in the ninth round of the 1967 MLB draft out of Georgia Southern University. He spent four seasons in the Indians Minor League system before joining the Chicago White Sox, Red Sox, Braves, and Reds organizations.

Correll spent most of his major league career as a backup catcher. From 1974 to 1976, he played behind Johnny Oates at Atlanta and was the starting catcher in 1975 and 1976. He returned to a backup role when Biff Pocoroba became the starter in 1977. In Cincinnati, he was the backup catcher behind Johnny Bench in 1978 and 1979. The Reds won the National West Division title in 1979, but Correll did not appear in post-season play.

His most productive season came in 1975 with the Braves when he posted career numbers in home runs (11), RBI (39) and games played (103).

Correll batted .247 with 82 homers and 346 RBI in 767 minor league games. He played winter ball for the Cardenales de Lara club of the Venezuelan Winter League in the 1975–76 and 1976–77 seasons.
