= Davey Johnson =

American baseball player and manager (1943–2025)

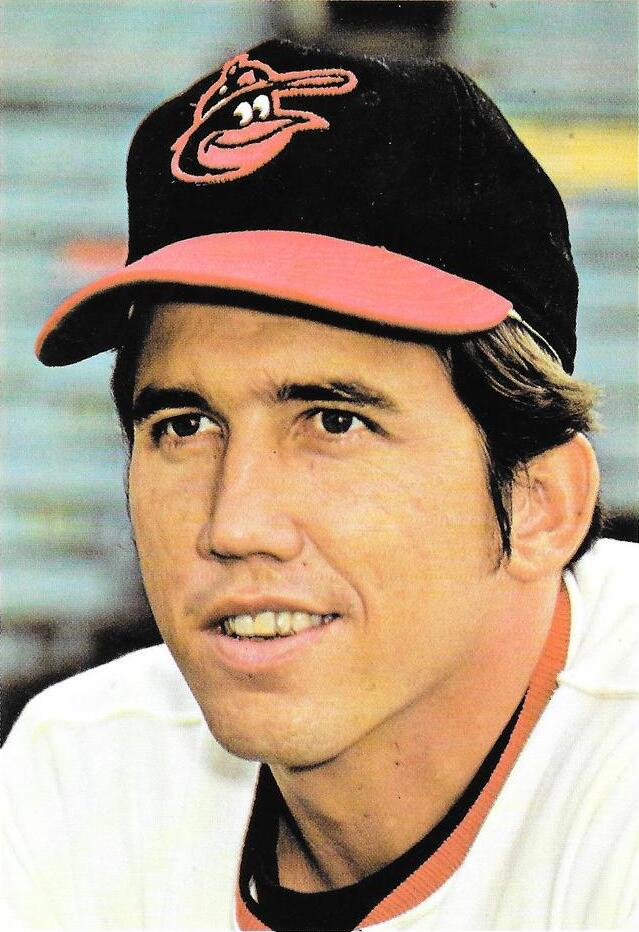
- Johnson with the Baltimore Orioles in 1972
- Second baseman / Manager
- Born: January 30, 1943; Orlando, Florida, U.S.
- Died: September 5, 2025 (aged 82); Sarasota, Florida, U.S.
- Batted: Right Threw: Right

Professional debut
- MLB: April 13, 1965, for the Baltimore Orioles
- NPB: April 22, 1975, for the Yomiuri Giants

Last appearance
- NPB: November 2, 1976, for the Yomiuri Giants
- MLB: September 29, 1978, for the Chicago Cubs

MLB statistics
- Batting average: .261
- Home runs: 136
- Runs batted in: 609
- Managerial record: 1,372–1,071
- Winning %: .562

NPB statistics
- Batting average: .241
- Home runs: 39
- Runs batted in: 112
- Stats at Baseball Reference
- Managerial record at Baseball Reference

Teams
- As player: Baltimore Orioles (1965–1972); Atlanta Braves (1973–1975); Yomiuri Giants (1975–1976); Philadelphia Phillies (1977–1978); Chicago Cubs (1978); As manager: New York Mets (1984–1990); Cincinnati Reds (1993–1995); Baltimore Orioles (1996–1997); Los Angeles Dodgers (1999–2000); Washington Nationals (2011–2013)

Career highlights and awards
- 4× All-Star (1968–1970, 1973); 3× World Series champion (1966, 1970, 1986); 3× Gold Glove Award (1969–1971); 2× Manager of the Year (1997, 2012); Baltimore Orioles Hall of Fame; New York Mets Hall of Fame
Medals
Men's baseball
Manager for the United States
Summer Olympics
Bronze medal – third place	2008 Beijing	Team
Baseball World Cup
Gold medal – first place	2007 Tianmu	Team
Manager for Netherlands
European Championship
Gold medal – first place	2003 Netherlands	Team

David Allen Johnson (January 30, 1943 – September 5, 2025) was an American professional baseball player and manager. He played as a second baseman from 1965 through 1978, most notably in Major League Baseball (MLB) as a member of the Baltimore Orioles dynasty which won four American League pennants and two World Series championships between 1966 and 1971. Johnson played in MLB from 1965 to 1975, then played for two seasons in Nippon Professional Baseball (NPB) before returning to play in MLB with the Philadelphia Phillies and Chicago Cubs from 1977 to 1978. A three-time Rawlings Gold Glove Award winner, he was selected to four All-Star Game teams during his playing career.

A mathematics major at Trinity University in San Antonio, Texas, Johnson was among the first Major League managers to apply computer-based statistical analysis to decision-making, an approach which later became known as sabermetrics.

After retiring as a player, Johnson became a successful manager. He led the New York Mets to the 1986 World Series title, and to an additional National League East title in 1988. He won the American League's Manager of the Year Award in 1997, when he led the Baltimore Orioles wire-to-wire to the American League East division championship. He won the same award in the National League in 2012, when he led the Washington Nationals to the franchise's first division title since they moved to Washington, D.C., and its first overall since 1981. Johnson managed teams to their respective League Championship Series in three consecutive years – the Cincinnati Reds in 1995 and the Orioles in both 1996 and 1997. He also briefly managed the Los Angeles Dodgers. He led the United States national team at the 2009 World Baseball Classic, earning fourth place.

== Early life ==
Johnson was born to a military family in Orlando, Florida; Frederick served as an tank commander in the U.S. Army in World War II while his mother Florence was formerly a competitive swimmer. The family moved around various Army bases before eventually settling in San Antonio, Texas, where he attended Alamo Heights High School.

Johnson elected to attend Texas A&M University in College Station after being recruited by head coach Tom Chandler. He ended up playing two years on the basketball team, with his sophomore season seeing him letter as a guard. He played at shortstop for the Aggies on the baseball team in 1962 and batted .309 while initially studying to be a veterinarian. At age 19, he was approached by scouts.

== Playing career ==
Johnson signed with the Baltimore Orioles as an amateur free agent in 1962. He had been scouted by the Orioles’ Jim Russo. Johnson was then assigned to the Stockton Ports in the Class C California League where he hit .309 with 10 home runs and 63 runs batted in (RBIs) in 97 games. Promoted to the AA Elmira Pioneers in 1963, he hit .326 in 63 games before advancing to the AAA Rochester Red Wings for the final 63 games of the season. Returning to the Red Wings for the entire 1964 season, Johnson had 19 home runs, 73 RBIs, and 87 runs.

In 1965, Johnson made the Orioles' team after spring training, but after hitting only .170 in 20 games he spent the latter part of the season with the Red Wings, batting .301 in 52 games. Back with the Orioles in 1966, Johnson took the starting second baseman job from Jerry Adair, which led to the Orioles trading Adair to the Chicago White Sox on June 13. Johnson then hit for a .257 batting average, seven home runs and 56 RBIs to finish third in American League Rookie of the Year balloting for 1966. Johnson was a full-time starter in the major leagues for the next eight seasons, averaging over 142 games played in a season.

Johnson reached the World Series with the Orioles in 1966, 1969, 1970, and 1971, winning World Series rings in 1966 and 1970. He also won the AL Gold Glove Award the final three seasons. Orioles shortstop Mark Belanger won the award as well in 1969 and 1971, making them one of the few middle infield duos to have won the honor in the same season. Third baseman Brooks Robinson also was in the middle of his record 16 straight Gold Glove streak when Johnson and Belanger won their awards.

Upset after being replaced as the starting second baseman by Bobby Grich, and with the Orioles in need of a power-hitting catcher, Johnson was traded along with Pat Dobson, Johnny Oates, and Roric Harrison to the Atlanta Braves for Earl Williams and Taylor Duncan on the last day of the Winter Meetings on December 1, 1972. The following season with the Braves, Johnson hit 40 home runs for the first and only time in his career, tying Rogers Hornsby's record for most single-season home runs by a second baseman with 42, and hitting a 43rd as a pinch-hitter. Johnson's second-highest home run total was 18, in the 1971 season. That same season Atlanta's Darrell Evans hit 41 home runs, and Hank Aaron hit 40 homers, making the 1973 Braves the first team to feature three teammates that each hit 40 home runs in the same season. Four games into the 1975 season and after getting a hit in his only at bat, Johnson was released by the Braves.

Johnson then signed with the Yomiuri Giants of Japan's Central League, with whom he played in both the 1975 and 1976 seasons. Johnson was the Giants' first foreign player of note in more than 15 years, and faced a lot of pressure to perform in Japan. He struggled in his first season, battling injuries, and incurred the wrath of the Giants' manager (and former Hall of Fame player) Shigeo Nagashima. Despite playing much better in 1976, Johnson was not invited back by the Giants, who also reportedly prevented him from signing with any other NPB teams.

In 1977, Johnson returned to the United States, signing as a free agent with the Philadelphia Phillies. As a utility infielder, Johnson hit .321 with eight home runs in 78 games and played in one game in the Phillies' National League Championship Series loss to the Dodgers.

During the 1978 season, Johnson hit two grand slams as a pinch-hitter, becoming the first major leaguer to accomplish this in a season. (Four other players, Mike Ivie (1978), Darryl Strawberry (1998), Ben Broussard (2004), and Brooks Conrad (2010), subsequently matched Johnson's feat.) Shortly afterwards, Philadelphia dealt him to the Chicago Cubs, with whom he played the final 24 games of his career before retiring at the end of the 1978 season.

== Managing career ==
=== Minor leagues ===
In 1979, Johnson was hired to be the manager of the Miami Amigos of the Triple-A Inter-American League. Although Johnson guided the team of released and undrafted players to a .708 winning percentage, the league folded 72 games into its only season, having planned to play a 130-game season. In 1981, Johnson was hired to manage the New York Mets Double-A team, the Jackson Mets, leading the team to a 68–66 record in his only season with the team. In 1983, Johnson was named as the manager of the Mets Triple-A Tidewater Tides, which finished with a 71–68 record.

=== New York Mets ===
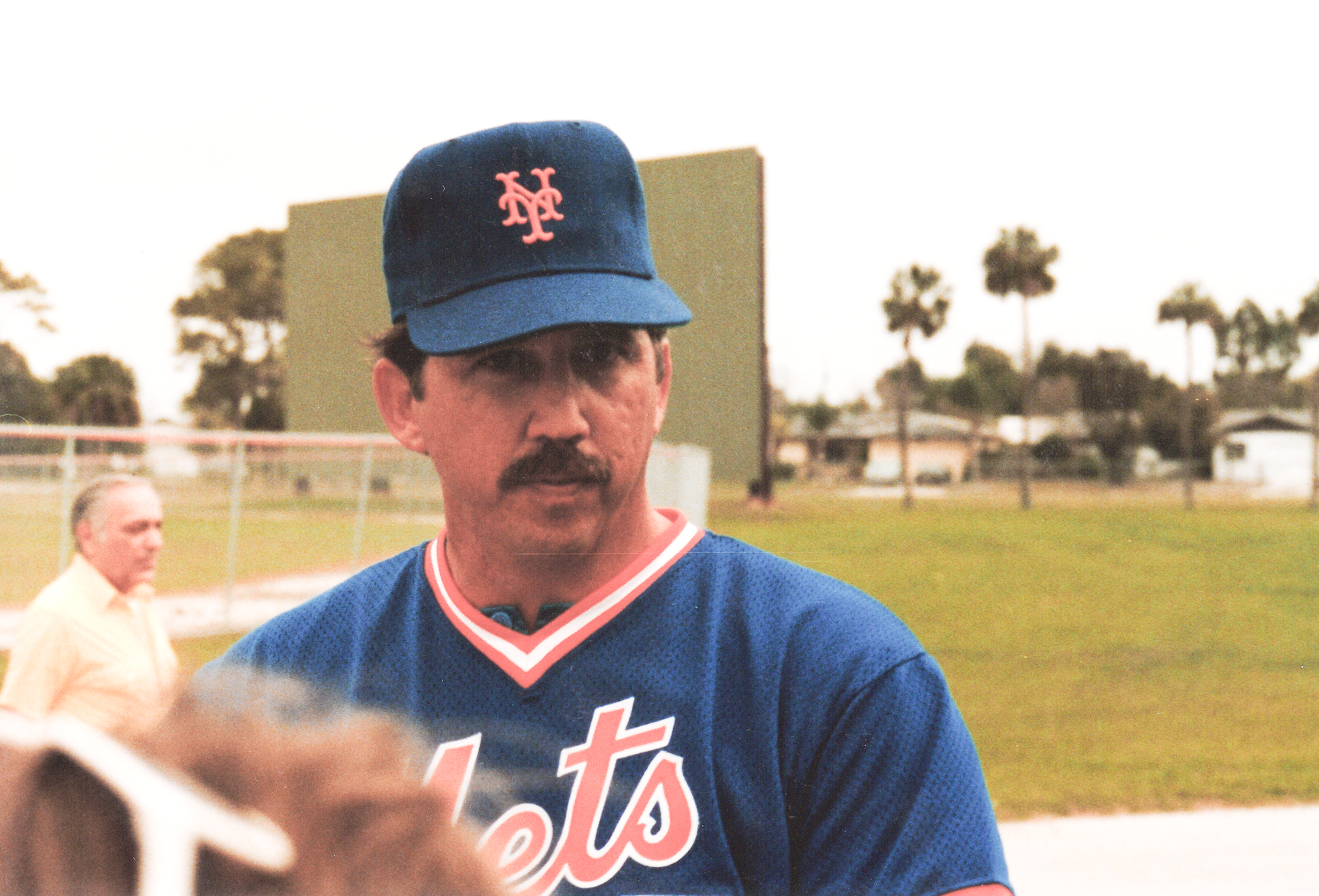
Johnson during spring training in St. Petersburg, Florida, February 1986

Johnson took over the Mets in 1984, a team that had not won a pennant since 1973. He became the first National League manager to win at least 90 games in each of his first five seasons. The highlight of his time with the Mets was winning the 1986 World Series against the Boston Red Sox.

Years later, he summed up his approach to managing by saying, "I treated my players like men. As long as they won for me on the field, I didn't give a flying fuck what they did otherwise." The 1983 team had won 68 games, but talent was showing for a potential winner with rookie Darryl Strawberry. A trade to acquire Keith Hernandez and Johnson's decision to suggest bringing up Dwight Gooden helped turn them into a winner of 90 games for the 1984 season. Gary Carter was acquired in December 1984, and the Mets won 98 games the next year, but it was only good enough for another second-place finish (three games behind St. Louis). The 1986 team won 108 games, which was the best in the majors. It was only the second time the Mets won 100 games in a season, with the other time being 1969.

The Mets won 92 games the following season, but they fell three games short of matching St. Louis. The next year, they won 100 games to win the division. The NLCS ended with a seven-game loss to the Los Angeles Dodgers, which turned on a loss in Game 4 after winning two of the first three games.

Johnson had a bitter feud with general manager Frank Cashen. When the Mets struggled early in the 1990 season, starting the season 20–22, Johnson was fired. He finished with a record of 595 wins and 417 losses in the regular season and 11 wins and nine losses in the postseason. He is the winningest manager in Mets history and was inducted into the Mets Hall of Fame with Cashen, Strawberry, and Gooden on August 1, 2010.

=== Cincinnati Reds ===
After more than two seasons out of baseball, the Cincinnati Reds hired Johnson 44 games into the 1993 season. As was the case with the Mets, Johnson revived the Reds almost immediately. The next season, he led the team to the National League Central division lead at the time of the 1994 players' strike and won the first official NL Central title in 1995. However, early in the 1995 season, Reds owner Marge Schott announced Johnson would not return in 1996, regardless of how the Reds did. Schott named former Reds third baseman Ray Knight, who had played for Johnson on the Mets championship team, as bench coach, with the understanding that he would take over as manager in 1996.

Johnson and Schott had never gotten along, and relations had deteriorated to the point that he had nearly been fired after the 1994 season. According to Johnson, Schott would even send notes to him that were addressed to him by her St. Bernard. By most accounts, the final straw came because Schott did not approve of Johnson living with his fiancée Susan before they were married (the two met in 1993 and married a year later). According to The Washington Post, Schott had decided before the 1995 season even started that it would be Johnson's last one in Cincinnati. The Reds defeated the Dodgers in the NLDS and reached the NLCS in Johnson's last season as the Reds' manager, being swept by the eventual World Series champion Atlanta Braves. Johnson finished with a record of 204 wins and 172 losses in the regular season and three wins and four losses in the post-season. The Reds would not reach the postseason again until Dusty Baker led them to the NL Central title in 2010. To date, Johnson remains the last Reds manager to win a playoff series.

=== Baltimore Orioles ===
In 1996, Johnson returned to Baltimore as the Orioles' manager on a three-year, $2.25 million contract. The Orioles had gone 71–73 the previous year, but the team had promising talent to go with future Hall of Famers Cal Ripken Jr., Mike Mussina, Eddie Murray, and Roberto Alomar. The team went 88–74, finishing four games behind the New York Yankees in the AL East but it was good enough for the wild card by three games. It was the Orioles' first trip to the postseason since winning the 1983 World Series. The Orioles defeated the Cleveland Indians in the Division Series, the defending champion of the American League who had won 99 games, the best in the majors that season, and lost the Championship Series against the New York Yankees.

In 1997, the Orioles went 98–64 to finish with the best record in the American League while retaining the key core from before (albeit with the loss of Murray while acquiring future Hall of Famer Harold Baines mid-season). In the Division Series, they faced the Seattle Mariners. The Orioles won the series in four games, as they routed the Mariners with 23 runs while allowing just 11. They met the Cleveland Indians in the Championship Series, who had upset the Yankees. The Orioles lost in six games.

Johnson and Orioles owner Peter Angelos never got along. In fact, the two men almost never spoke to each other. The end reportedly came when Johnson fined Roberto Alomar for skipping a team banquet in April 1997 and an exhibition game against the Triple-A Rochester Red Wings during the 1997 All-Star Break. Johnson ordered Alomar to pay the fine by making out a check to a charity for which his wife served as a fundraiser. However, Alomar donated the money to another charity after players' union lawyers advised him of the possible conflict of interest. In negotiations after the season, Angelos let it be known that he considered Johnson's handling of the Alomar fine to be grossly inappropriate, enough to be a fireable offense. Johnson was prepared to admit he had made an error in judgment regarding the fine, but Angelos demanded Johnson admit he had acted recklessly in not leaving the decision to him. Presumably, such an admission would have given Angelos grounds to fire Johnson for cause. Johnson refused to do so. Johnson had doubts over whether he would return for the final year of his contract (saying as much eight days after the Orioles had lost on October 15), and a spirited 90-minute phone call between Johnson and Angelos a week later was the last time they spoke to each other. He offered his resignation by fax (after failing to reach Angelos by phone), which Angelos accepted on the same day that Johnson was named American League Manager of the Year on November 5. Johnson did not express bitterness with his time in Baltimore, although Angelos released the text of his response letter to the resignation, stating that Johnson's letter "fails to recognize the real issue posed by your imposition and handling of the Alomar fine and your divisive statement to the press in July that unless the Orioles got to the World Series, you would not be permitted to return ... Your own actions and conduct, not mine, have produced the fulfillment of your prophecy."

The Orioles promoted pitching coach Ray Miller (who Angelos had hired after ordering Pat Dobson to be removed after the 1996 season), but the team did not have another winning season, let alone win a postseason berth until 2012. As Orioles manager, Johnson logged a winning percentage of .574.

=== Los Angeles Dodgers ===
Johnson had interviewed with the Toronto Blue Jays after the 1997 season but wasn't hired. Two years later, he returned to the majors as manager of the Los Angeles Dodgers, who had won 88 games the previous year. On May 3, he won his 1,000th game as manager, doing so with a 7–0 victory over the Montreal Expos. Johnson did so in his 1,740th game as manager. No manager reached the 1,000 wins plateau nearly as fast as Johnson until Joe Girardi (1,808) in 2020. Johnson suffered the only full losing season of his managerial career, finishing in third place eight games under .500 with 77 wins. While the Dodgers rebounded to second place the next year, it was not enough to save Johnson's job. He finished with a record of 163 wins and 161 losses despite having high-priced talent, such as Kevin Brown and Gary Sheffield (alongside growing talent in future Hall of Famer Adrián Beltré), acquired by general manager Kevin Malone.

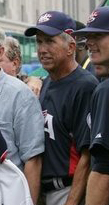
Johnson with the U.S. national team in August 2008, President George W. Bush is directly on Johnson's right, not seen in photo

=== International baseball ===
Johnson briefly managed the Netherlands national team in 2003 during the absence of Robert Eenhoorn, first at the 2003 World Port Tournament, where the Netherlands lost to Cuba in the finals, and then at the 2003 European Baseball Championship, where the Netherlands won the tournament. Johnson served as a bench coach under Eenhoorn at the 2003 Baseball World Cup and at the 2004 Summer Olympics.

He then managed the United States national team to a seventh-place finish out of an 18-team field in the 2005 Baseball World Cup, held in the Netherlands. The American team finished tied for second in its group during group play with a 6–2 record before falling, 11–3, to eventual winner and 24-time World Cup champion Cuba in the quarterfinals. A subsequent 9–0 loss to Nicaragua put the Americans into the seventh-place game with Puerto Rico, where they prevailed with an 11–3 win.

Johnson served as bench coach for the U.S. during the inaugural 2006 World Baseball Classic. At the 2007 Baseball World Cup in Taiwan, he managed the U.S. to its first world title in more than three decades. He went on to manage the team at the 2008 Summer Olympics in China, earning a bronze medal, and at 2009 World Baseball Classic, finishing in fourth place.

He also coached in the Florida Collegiate Summer League, for the DeLand Suns in 2009 then the Sanford River Rats in 2010.

=== Washington Nationals ===
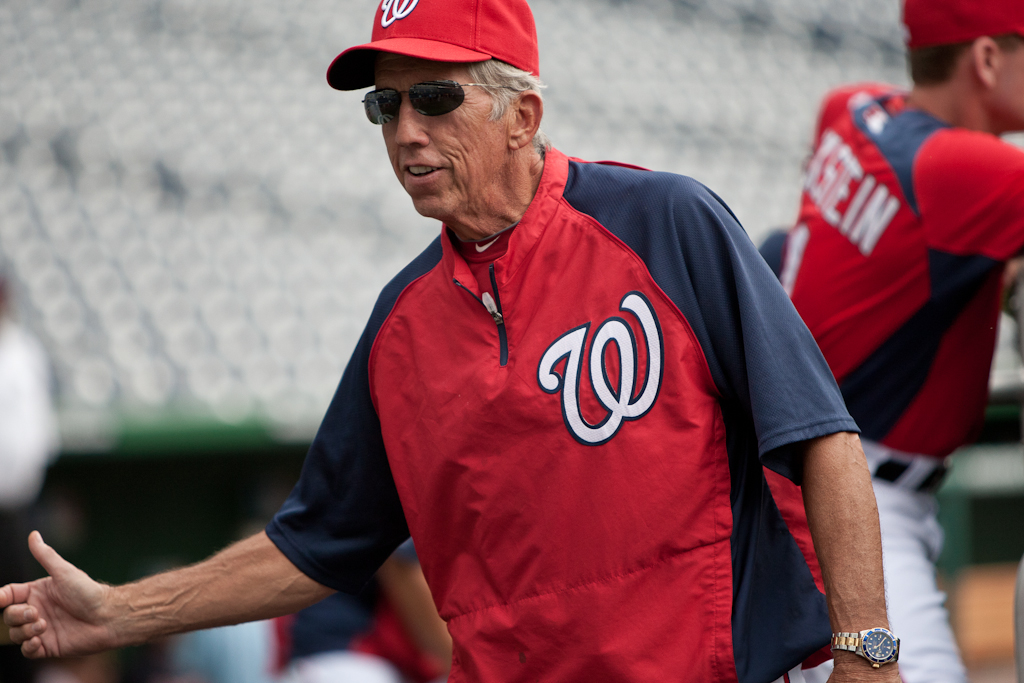
Johnson with the Nationals in August 2011

Johnson first joined the Washington Nationals front office on June 7, 2006, when he was appointed a consultant by vice president/general manager Jim Bowden. He was named a senior advisor to former GM Mike Rizzo after the 2009 campaign. He became the Nationals manager on June 26, 2011, after the unexpected resignation of Jim Riggleman three days earlier. He served as manager for the rest of the 2011 season. The Nationals won eighty total games in that season, which was good enough for a third-place finish, the best finish for the organization since the move to Washington. On October 31, the Nationals announced that Davey Johnson would be their manager for the 2012 season.

Johnson led the Nationals to the franchise's first division title since 1981 (when they were the Montreal Expos) in 2012, achieving a franchise-record 98 wins—the most wins in baseball that year. They lost the Division Series to the St. Louis Cardinals. It was the third and final time that Johnson had led a team to the best record in the majors without leading them to the World Series. On November 10, Johnson signed a contract to return as manager of the Nationals for the 2013 season. Three days later, Johnson was named National League Manager of the Year. Johnson noted in his autobiography that just before being awarded the Manager of the Year award, he was offered to sign a document by owner Mark Lerner and GM Mike Rizzo to retire after the 2013 season, as opposed to simply not renewing the contract. At any rate, Johnson called the season a "World Series or bust" year, which came to backfire on him.

The 2013 team struggled after a promising start of winning seven of their first ten games, as they went into the All-Star break with a 48–47 record. Despite having a 18–9 record in the month of September, they finished four games out of a wild card berth while finishing second in the NL East with an 86–76 record. On September 29, 2013, Johnson announced his retirement. He had the club record for wins (224) until Dave Martinez passed him in 2021. In 2014, Johnson became a consultant.

Just fifteen managers have finished with a record of 300 or more wins above .500. Johnson finished with a record of 1,372–1,071–2 to finish 301 games above .500 as a manager. In all but one full season as a manager, he won at least 85 games. He is also tenth all time in winning percentage for managers with 1,000 wins. All but Johnson in each category have been inducted into the National Baseball Hall of Fame and Museum, and he has missed induction four times (twice on the Veterans Committee in 2008 and 2010 and twice with Today's Game ballot in 2017 and 2019).

=== Managerial record ===
Team	Year	Regular season					Postseason			
Team	Year	Games	Won	Lost	Win %	Finish	Won	Lost	Win %	Result
NYM	1984	162	90	72	.556	2nd in NL East	–	–	–	–
NYM	1985	162	98	64	.605	2nd in NL East	–	–	–	–
NYM	1986	162	108	54	.667	1st in NL East	8	5	.615	Won World Series (BOS)
NYM	1987	162	92	70	.568	2nd in NL East	–	–	–	–
NYM	1988	160	100	60	.625	1st in NL East	3	4	.429	Lost NLCS (LAD)
NYM	1989	162	87	75	.537	2nd in NL East	–	–	–	–
NYM	1990	42	20	22	.476	fired	–	–	–	–
NYM total		1012	595	417	.588		11	9	.550	
CIN	1993	118	53	65	.449	5th in NL West	–	–	–	–
CIN	1994	114	66	48	.579	1st in NL Central	–	–	–	–
CIN	1995	144	85	59	.590	1st in NL Central	3	4	.429	Lost NLCS (ATL)
CIN total		376	204	172	.543		3	4	.429	
BAL	1996	162	88	74	.543	2nd in AL East	4	5	.444	Lost ALCS (NYY)
BAL	1997	162	98	64	.605	1st in AL East	5	5	.500	Lost ALCS (CLE)
BAL total		324	186	138	.574		9	10	.474	
LAD	1999	162	77	85	.475	3rd in NL West	–	–	–	–
LAD	2000	162	86	76	.531	2nd in NL West	–	–	–	–
LAD total		324	163	161	.503		0	0	–	
WAS	2011	83	40	43	.482	3rd in NL East	–	–	–	–
WAS	2012	162	98	64	.605	1st in NL East	2	3	.400	Lost NLDS (STL)
WAS	2013	162	86	76	.531	2nd in NL East	–	–	–	–
WAS total		407	224	183	.550		2	3	.400	
Total		2443	1372	1071	.562		25	26	.490	

== Pioneering use of sabermetrics ==
Johnson was an early proponent of what would later become known as sabermetrics. A mathematics major at Trinity University, he taught himself computer programming in 1969 and used statistical simulations to analyze player performance and optimize lineups. During his playing career, he earned the nickname "Dum Dum" for advising pitchers to challenge hitters by throwing more strikes over the middle of the plate, based on his data-driven approach. He also created computer printouts suggesting lineup strategies for Orioles manager Earl Weaver, although Weaver chose not to use them.

As a manager, Johnson integrated data-driven strategies—such as emphasizing on-base percentage and favorable platoon matchups—long before such methods gained mainstream acceptance in Major League Baseball. His analytical approach, particularly with the New York Mets in the 1980s, helped lay the groundwork for the sport's later embrace of sabermetrics.

== Personal life ==
Johnson was born in Orlando, Florida. He graduated from Alamo Heights High School in San Antonio, Texas. He attended Johns Hopkins University in Baltimore, as well as Texas A&M University, and graduated from Trinity University in San Antonio, Texas, in 1964, with a bachelor's degree in mathematics.

Johnson's first marriage, to Mary Nan, ended in divorce. Together they had three children: David Jr., Dawn, and Andrea.

Johnson met his second wife, Susan, in 1993 (they married the following January) while she was organizing a golf tournament for her deaf-blind son Jake and his learning center (she also specialized in working with a charity for Johns Hopkins Hospital). Both Davey and Susan had been married once prior, and both had dealt with health issues of offspring, an issue over which they bonded. Johnson's daughter, Andrea, was a nationally ranked amateur surfer in the late 1980s. She died in 2005 from septic shock and complications from schizophrenia. In 2011, Susan's son (Davey's stepson) Jake died from pneumonia at age 34.

Johnson co-wrote Bats, a diary of the Mets' 1985 season, with longtime sportswriter Peter Golenbock. It was released early in 1986. After the Mets captured the World Series title in October 1986, Davey and Golenbock added another chapter about that season for the paperback edition, published in early 1987.

In 2018, Davey Johnson, alongside Erik Sherman, wrote his autobiography, My Wild Ride in Baseball and Beyond, with the proceeds going to his wife Susan's nonprofit organization, Support Our Scholars.

In 2021, Davey Johnson was treated in a hospital after contracting COVID-19, but recovered.

== Death ==
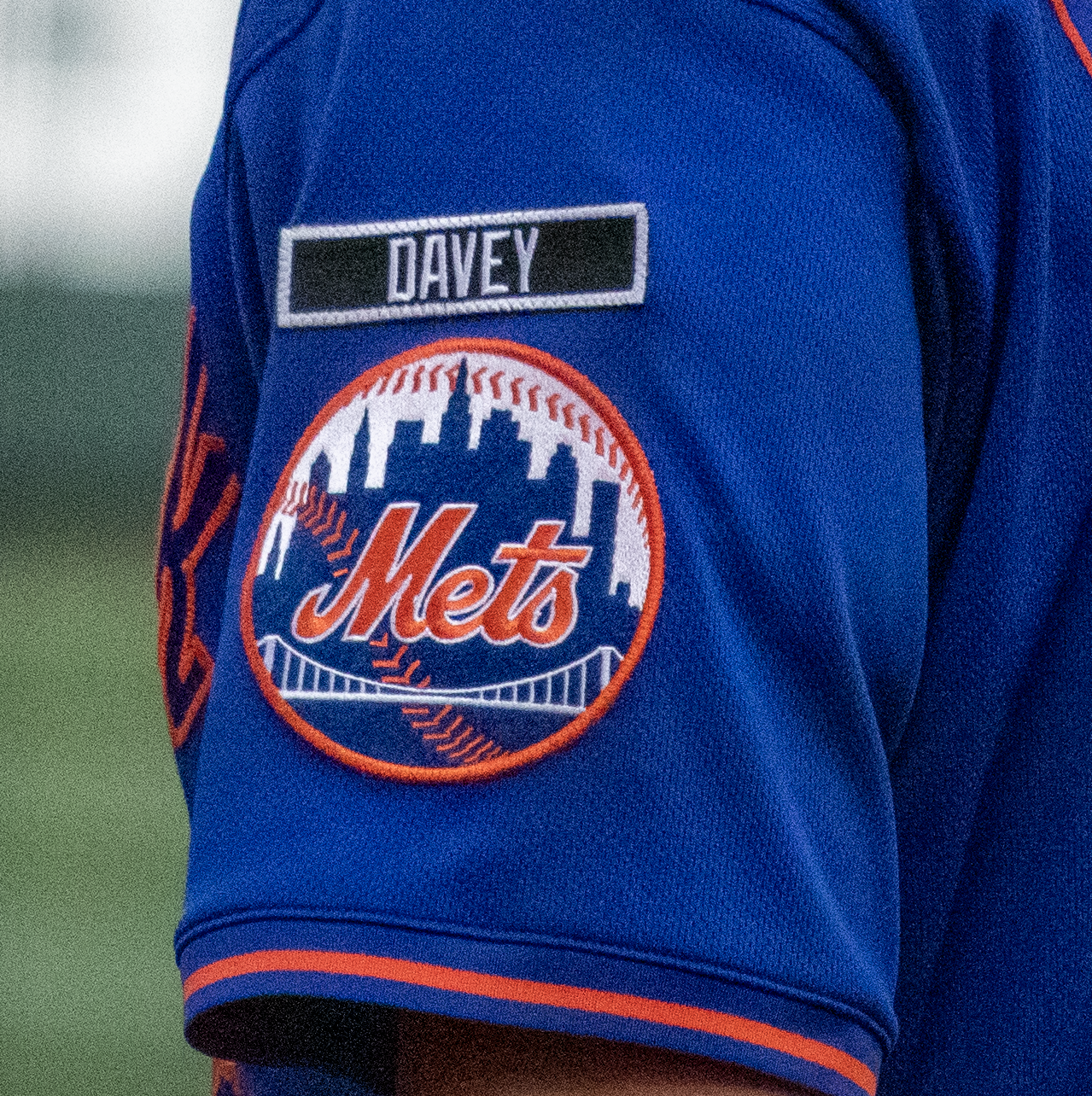
Davey Johnson Patch worn to honor the late Mets Manager.

Johnson died at a hospital in Sarasota, Florida, on September 5, 2025. He was 82.

That day, Ken Rosenthal was on Fox broadcasting a game between Houston and Texas, and memorialized Davey on air: "...'96 and '97, those were two fun years. Davey Johnson was the smartest guy in the room and he knew that he was the smartest guy in the room. There was a night in Chicago... the Orioles at the time had an alternate closer thing going on Benitez, Randy Myers. They were sort of trying to choose between the two (pitchers-selecting a closer). A cold night in Chicago in April, Davey uses one when it appeared that he might use the other. We all go downstairs to interview him after the game. He's still shivering. He opens up without even taking a question by saying I know you guys, us the writers, were second-guessing me up there. I'm the manager, I'm the one making all the money, I'm good (without having to answer to you!) At that point there was nothing to ask, that was Davey ...the other thing I remember so vividly, he had this feud with the Orioles owner at the time, Peter Angelos when he (Johnson) was named the manager of the year. This was the only time in baseball history that this has (ever) happened. He (Johnson) resigned that day and on the conference call that day, he said hey, anybody know of any openings? I could use a job!"

== See also ==
- List of Gold Glove middle infield duos
- List of Major League Baseball managers with most career wins
