= Johnny Oates =

American baseball player, coach and manager (1946–2004)

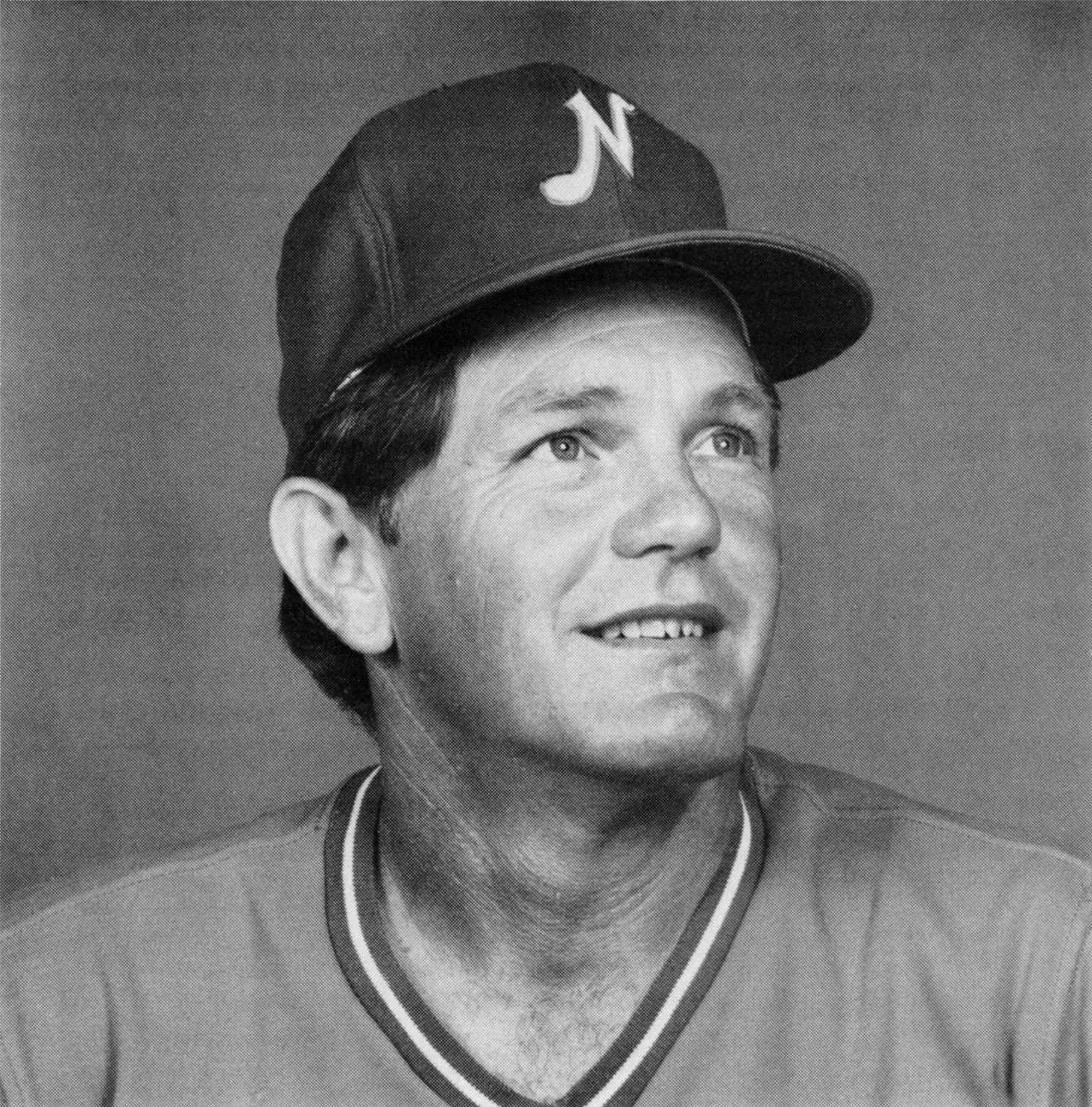
- Oates with the Nashville Sounds in 1982
- Catcher / Manager
- Born: January 21, 1946; Sylva, North Carolina, U.S.
- Died: December 24, 2004 (aged 58); Richmond, Virginia, U.S.
- Batted: Left Threw: Right

MLB debut
- September 17, 1970, for the Baltimore Orioles

Last MLB appearance
- May 24, 1981, for the New York Yankees

MLB statistics
- Batting average: .250
- Home runs: 14
- Runs batted in: 126
- Managerial record: 797–746
- Winning %: .517
- Stats at Baseball Reference
- Managerial record at Baseball Reference

Teams
- As player: Baltimore Orioles (1970, 1972); Atlanta Braves (1973–1975); Philadelphia Phillies (1975–1976); Los Angeles Dodgers (1977–1979); New York Yankees (1980–1981); As manager: Baltimore Orioles (1991–1994); Texas Rangers (1995–2001); As coach: Chicago Cubs (1984–1987); Baltimore Orioles (1989–1991)

Career highlights and awards
- AL Manager of the Year (1996); Texas Rangers No. 26 retired; Baltimore Orioles Hall of Fame; Texas Rangers Hall of Fame

Johnny Lane Oates (January 21, 1946 – December 24, 2004) was an American professional baseball player, coach, and manager. He played in Major League Baseball (MLB) as a catcher for the Baltimore Orioles, Atlanta Braves, Philadelphia Phillies, Los Angeles Dodgers, and New York Yankees from 1970 to 1981. During his playing career, Oates was a light-hitting player who was valued for his defensive skills and played most of his career as a reserve player. It was as a big league manager that Oates experienced his greatest success, when, under his leadership, the Texas Rangers won three American League Western Division titles.

== Baseball playing career ==
Born in Sylva, North Carolina, Oates graduated from Prince George High School in Prince George, Virginia, before going on to Virginia Tech in Blacksburg. He was selected by the Baltimore Orioles as their first round pick in the 1967 Major League Baseball Secondary Draft.

Oates began his professional baseball career with the Bluefield Orioles, then the Miami Marlins in 1967 at the age of 21. After two seasons with Miami, Oates moved up to the Dallas–Fort Worth Spurs in 1969, where he hit for a .288 batting average in 66 games. He continued his climb up the minor league ladder in 1970, playing for the Triple-A Rochester Red Wings before making his major league debut with the Baltimore Orioles at the age of 24 on September 17, 1970. Oates was not on the post-season roster for The Orioles that won the 1970 World Series. Oates returned to the minor leagues in 1971, playing another season with Rochester, where he posted a .277 batting average along with a respectable .364 on-base percentage.

Oates was brought back up to the Orioles for the 1972 season, where he caught the majority of the Orioles' games. His defensive skills became apparent as he led American League catchers with a .995 fielding percentage. In a transaction primarily driven by the Orioles' need for a power-hitting catcher, Oates was traded along with Davey Johnson, Pat Dobson and Roric Harrison to the Atlanta Braves for Earl Williams and Taylor Duncan on the last day of the Winter Meetings on December 1, 1972. Oates spent two seasons with the Braves, platooning alongside Paul Casanova, then Vic Correll, before being traded to the Philadelphia Phillies in May 1975.

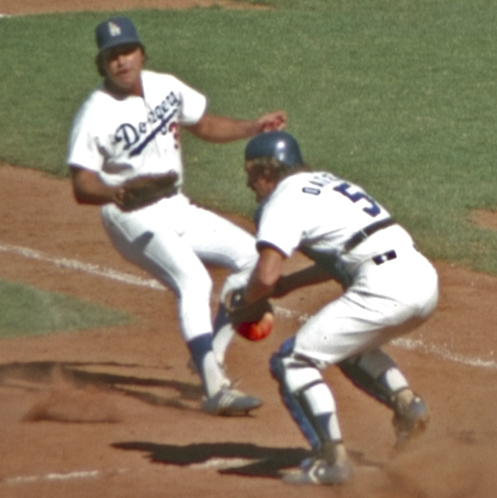
Oates (right) playing catcher for the Los Angeles Dodgers in 1978

Oates had been designated to platoon at catcher with Bob Boone for the 1976 season; however, in the season-opening game against the Pittsburgh Pirates, he cracked his collar bone in a collision at home plate with Dave Parker and missed almost half the season. "That play changed my career", he said afterwards. He returned to help the Phillies win the 1976 National League Eastern Division pennant. Oates had one plate appearance, as a pinch hitter, in the 1976 National League Championship Series as the Phillies lost to the eventual world champion Cincinnati Reds. After the season, he was traded to the Los Angeles Dodgers on December 20, 1976.

With the Dodgers, Oates worked as a second-string catcher behind Steve Yeager and would once again reach the post-season as the Dodgers clinched the 1977 National League West title. The Dodgers went on to defeat the Philadelphia Phillies in the 1977 National League Championship Series before eventually losing to the New York Yankees in the 1977 World Series. In 1978, Oates appeared in only 40 games as the Dodgers repeated as Western Division champions and, once again defeated the Philadelphia Phillies in the 1978 National League Championship Series. The 1978 World Series was also a repeat of the previous year, as the Dodgers once again lost to the Yankees in a six-game series. Oates' playing time decreased further in 1979, as he appeared in only 26 games before being released at the end of the season. He became a free agent and signed a contract to play for the New York Yankees on April 4, 1980. Oates served as a backup to Rick Cerone during the 1980 season before playing in his final game on May 24, 1981, at the age of 35.

== Managing ==
Oates began managing in baseball in 1982. That year, he guided the New York Yankees' Double-A Nashville Sounds to the Southern League title. From 1984 to 1987, he worked as a coach for the Chicago Cubs and was credited with developing Jody Davis into a Gold Glove Award winning catcher. He rejoined the Orioles organization at their Rochester AAA affiliate in 1988. The following year, he was promoted to the majors where he worked as first base coach under Frank Robinson, and in 1991, after Robinson started 13–24, Oates was promoted to the manager of the Orioles. In his first full season with the team, Oates led the Orioles to an 89–73 record and then to an 85–77 record in 1993, which helped him to win The Sporting News Manager of the Year Award. However, following the strike-shortened 1994 season, Oates was dismissed by new owner Peter Angelos. He finished his Orioles managerial career with a record of 291 wins and 270 losses.

Oates was hired by the Texas Rangers, who had just fired their previous manager, Kevin Kennedy. Oates proceeded to lead the Rangers to their first playoff appearance in team history during the 1996 season. Despite the team's poor ERA (the team averaged 4.65 collectively), the Rangers' batting lineup was incredibly potent, featuring Iván Rodríguez, Will Clark, Mark McLemore, Dean Palmer, Rusty Greer, Juan González, and Mickey Tettleton; the team finished 90–72. Oates won the 1996 American League Manager of the Year Award that year, sharing honors with the Yankees' Joe Torre.

Oates continued to lead the Rangers for several more seasons, leading them to American League West titles in 1998 and 1999. However, the Rangers would win just one playoff game in that span (winning Game 1 of the 1996 American League Division Series), and the latter two ALDS appearances saw the Rangers score only one run each time, all at the hands of the New York Yankees, who won the World Series in those respective years. Oates' record of 1–9 (.100) is the worst for any manager with multiple postseason appearances.

In a blowout game on September 6, 2000, Oates had Scott Sheldon play all nine positions in a single game, making him the third player in MLB history to do so. Oates told reporters "After it got to be 10-1 … I thought it was the perfect night to do it."

Following a fourth-place finish in 2000 and beginning the 2001 season with an 11–17 record, Oates resigned as manager and third base coach Jerry Narron replaced him. Many fans, however, blamed Rangers management for the team's woes, saying that team management placed unreasonable expectations on Oates, especially after spending $252 million on free agent shortstop Alex Rodriguez. He finished his Rangers managerial career with a record of 506 wins and 476 losses.

== Career statistics ==
=== Playing ===
In an 11-year major league career, Oates played in 593 games, accumulating 410 hits in 1,637 at bats for a .250 career batting average along with 14 home runs, 126 runs batted in and a .309 on-base percentage. A good defensive player, he ended his career with a .987 fielding percentage.

=== Managerial record ===
Team	Year	Regular season					Postseason			
Team	Year	Games	Won	Lost	Win %	Finish	Won	Lost	Win %	Result
BAL	1991	125	54	71	.432	6th in AL East	–	–	–	–
BAL	1992	162	89	73	.549	3rd in AL East	–	–	–	–
BAL	1993	162	85	77	.525	3rd in AL East	–	–	–	–
BAL	1994	112	63	49	.563	2nd in AL East	–	–	–	–
BAL total		561	291	270	.519		0	0	–	
TEX	1995	144	74	70	.514	3rd in AL West	–	–	–	–
TEX	1996	162	90	72	.556	1st in AL West	1	3	.250	Lost ALDS (NYY)
TEX	1997	162	77	85	.475	3rd in AL West	–	–	–	–
TEX	1998	162	88	74	.543	1st in AL West	0	3	.000	Lost ALDS (NYY)
TEX	1999	162	95	67	.586	1st in AL West	0	3	.000	Lost ALDS (NYY)
TEX	2000	162	71	91	.438	4th in AL West	–	–	–	–
TEX	2001	28	11	17	.393	resigned	–	–	–	–
TEX total		982	506	476	.515		1	9	.100	
Total		1543	797	746	.517		1	9	.100	

== Honors ==
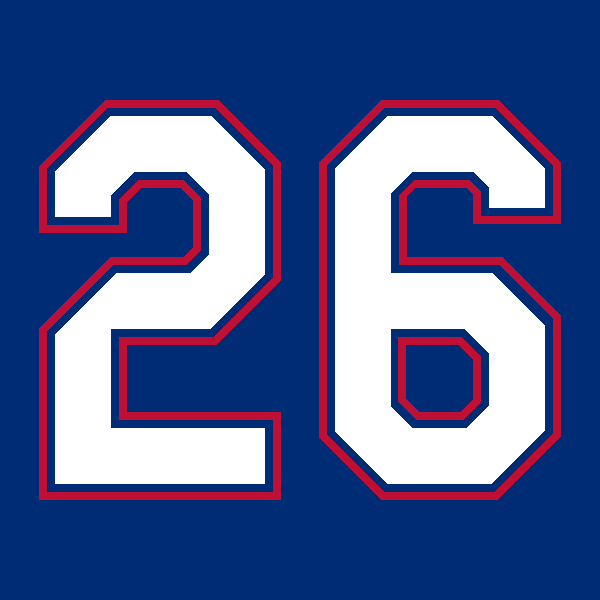
Johnny Oates's number 26 was retired by the Texas Rangers in 2005.

Oates was named American League Manager of the Year in 1996 when he led the Rangers to their first playoff berth in franchise history, winning the American League West Division. He won the Sporting News American League Manager of the Year Award that year (and also when he was managing the Orioles in 1993).

His uniform number 26 was retired by the Rangers on August 5, 2005. It was only the second number retired by the Rangers, following the 34 of Nolan Ryan. During the 2005 season, a commemorative patch was worn on all Ranger uniforms and a sign was hung on the outfield wall in his honor. Prior to Game 3 of the 2010 American League Division Series against the Tampa Bay Rays, his eight-year-old grandson, Johnny Oates II, threw out the ceremonial first pitch.

Oates was posthumously inducted into the Baltimore Orioles Hall of Fame on August 7, 2010. That same year, Buck Showalter had honored his friend Oates by choosing the number '26' as he took over management of the Baltimore Orioles.

Oates was inducted into the Virginia Tech Sports Hall of Fame in 1983. He was inducted into the Virginia Sports Hall of Fame (the state-wide organization) in 2003.

== Personal life ==
Oates was considering returning to managing when he was diagnosed with an aggressive brain tumor, glioblastoma multiforme. Doctors gave Oates only about a year to live, but he survived for over three years—enough time to attend his daughter's wedding, his grandchild's birth, and his induction into the Texas Rangers Hall of Fame at The Ballpark in Arlington. During the ceremony at The Ballpark, he was given a standing ovation as Oates, weakened by the cancer and its treatment, required the help of his wife Gloria and a cane to walk.

Oates died at age 58 at Virginia Commonwealth University Medical Center in Richmond on Christmas Eve 2004.

Sporting positions
Preceded by Stump Merrill	Nashville Sounds Manager; 1982	Succeeded by Doug Holmquist
Preceded by Frank Verdi	Columbus Clippers Manager; 1983	Succeeded by Stump Merrill
Preceded by Duffy Dyer	Chicago Cubs Bullpen Coach; 1984–1987	Succeeded by Larry Cox
Preceded by John Hart	Rochester Red Wings Manager; 1988	Succeeded by Greg Biagini
Preceded by Minnie Mendoza	Baltimore Orioles First Base Coach; 1989–1991	Succeeded by Curt Motton
