= Marty Perez =

American baseball player (born 1946)

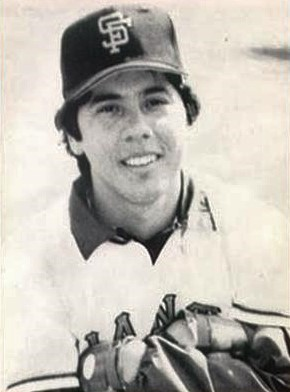
- Shortstop / Second baseman
- Born: February 28, 1946 (age 80); Visalia, California, U.S.
- Batted: Right Threw: Right

MLB debut
- September 9, 1969, for the California Angels

Last MLB appearance
- September 16, 1978, for the Oakland Athletics

MLB statistics
- Batting average: .246
- Home runs: 22
- Runs batted in: 241
- Stats at Baseball Reference

Teams
- California Angels (1969–1970); Atlanta Braves (1971–1976); San Francisco Giants (1976); New York Yankees (1977); Oakland Athletics (1977–1978)

Martin Roman Perez (born February 28, 1946) is an American former professional baseball shortstop and second baseman. He played in Major League Baseball (MLB) for the California Angels (1969–70), Atlanta Braves (1971–76), San Francisco Giants (1976), New York Yankees (1977) and Oakland Athletics (1977–78).

During his career as a shortstop and second baseman, he was a double play leader in the Texas and Pacific Coast leagues and a member of two championship-winning Minor League teams before being called up to the majors. He helped set an all-time Atlanta Braves' record for double plays in a season and for a season was the San Francisco Giants' most-used second baseman and led National League second basemen in fielding percentage.

== Early life ==
Perez was born in Visalia, California, to Martin and Dora (Garcia) Perez. He was the third of five children.

Martin Sr. was born in Aguascalientes, Mexico, and was a sheet metal worker. Dora was born in Pomona, California and was a "Rosie the Riveter" during World War II. She was a posthumous recipient of the Rosie the Riveter Congressional Gold Medal, awarded by the U.S. Congress in 2019 "to the women in the United States who joined the workforce during World War II, providing the aircraft, vehicles, weaponry, ammunition and other material to win the war ..."

Dora's father, identified in records as Mission Indian, attended Sherman Indian School in Riverside, California. Dora's mother was a Yaqui curandera, or traditional healer, from Altar, Sonora, Mexico. The family had close ties to the family of Mike Garcia, the pitcher for the Cleveland Indians, and both referred to each other as cousins.

Perez played football, basketball and baseball for Redwood High School in Visalia. He graduated from Redwood in 1964. He briefly attended College of the Sequoias and served for six years in the U.S. Marine Corps Reserve.

== Minor League career ==
Perez played shortstop and second base for Idaho Falls, Quad Cities and San Jose from 1964–67, hitting .238 in 113 games and garnering notice for his glove from the National Association of Baseball Writers, which named him to the 1967 Class A All-Stars West Squad. He was promoted in 1968 to the Class AA El Paso Sun Kings in the Texas League.

In El Paso, Perez led Texas League shortstops in assists with 363 and in double plays with 72; the Sun Kings won the Texas League championship that year. The Sporting News described Perez as “an exceptional young shortstop” and reported that the Angels had placed him on its roster.

Perez was promoted in 1969 to the Class AAA Hawaiian Islanders. He led Pacific Coast League shortstops in double plays with 79 and the Islanders went on to win the PCL Southern Division Championship.

== Major League career ==
Perez was called up to the majors as relief shortstop for Jim Fregosi in September 1969. He was traded in October 1970 to Atlanta.

Perez, 5 feet 10 inches and 160 pounds, was the Braves' starting shortstop from 1971–73 and their starting second baseman the following two seasons. In 1971, he helped the club break the all-time Braves' record for double plays in a season with 180 and in 1974 led National League second basemen in fielding percentage.

He was acquired by San Francisco on June 13, 1976 in a trade that included future Giants slugger Darrell Evans. Perez was the Giants' most-used second baseman that season, appearing in 89 games.

Perez was acquired in March 1977 by the defending AL champion New York Yankees to shore up their middle infield and possibly compete for the starting shortstop position. Soon after, however, the Yankees traded for Bucky Dent and Perez finished his Major League career at Oakland in 1977-78.

Perez played his last game for Oakland on May 16, 1978 and played the remainder of the season with the Tidewater Tides, a AAA farm club of the New York Mets.

In 10 seasons in the Major Leagues, Perez played in 931 games and had 3,131 at bats, 313 runs, 771 hits, 180 doubles, 22 triples, 22 home runs, 241 RBI, 11 stolen bases and 245 walks. His career batting average was .246. He had a .301 on-base percentage and .316 slugging percentage with 989 total bases, 56 sacrifice hits, 20 sacrifice flies and 10 intentional walks.
