= Roric Harrison =

American baseball player (1946–2023)

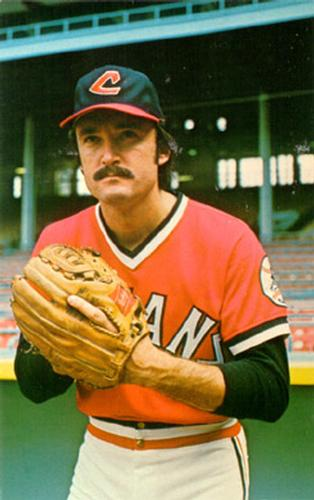
- Pitcher
- Born: September 20, 1946; Los Angeles, California, U.S.
- Died: September 17, 2023 (aged 76); Houston, Texas, U.S.
- Batted: Right Threw: Right

MLB debut
- April 18, 1972, for the Baltimore Orioles

Last MLB appearance
- July 23, 1978, for the Minnesota Twins

MLB statistics
- Win–loss record: 30–35
- Earned run average: 4.24
- Strikeouts: 319
- Stats at Baseball Reference

Teams
- Baltimore Orioles (1972); Atlanta Braves (1973–1975); Cleveland Indians (1975); Minnesota Twins (1978)

Roric Edward Harrison (September 20, 1946 – September 17, 2023) was an American professional baseball pitcher. He played in Major League Baseball for the Baltimore Orioles, Atlanta Braves, Cleveland Indians, and Minnesota Twins from 1972 to 1978.

== Early years ==
Harrison signed with the Houston Astros out of Westchester High School in Westchester, California, in 1965. Harrison amassed a 13–28 record in Houston's farm system and pitched just two innings for the Oklahoma City 89ers in 1969 when he was dealt to the Seattle Pilots with Dooley Womack for Jim Bouton.

Harrison pitched for the franchise's (now known as the Milwaukee Brewers) triple A affiliate, the Portland Beavers in 1970, and went 6–11 with a 5.57 earned run average. During spring training the following season, he and Marion Jackson were traded to the Baltimore Orioles for Marcelino López.

== Baltimore Orioles ==
Harrison improved to 15–5 with a 2.81 ERA for the Orioles' triple A affiliate, the Rochester Red Wings in 1971. The best pitcher in the International League that year, he attended spring training with the Orioles in 1972. He made the team, but as a relief, as Baltimore's four starters had each won 20 or more games the previous year. He did, however, make two emergency starts in the second games of doubleheaders, going 1–1 with a 6.75 in his two starts. For the season, he went 3–4 with a 2.30 ERA and four saves.

== Atlanta Braves ==
After just one season in Baltimore, Harrison was traded along with Davey Johnson, Pat Dobson and Johnny Oates to the Atlanta Braves for Earl Williams and Taylor Duncan on the last day of the Winter Meetings on December 1, 1972. Harrison was used as both a starter and reliever in Atlanta, compiling an 11–8 record and 4.16 ERA in both roles. He also added two home runs to his career total despite having only three hits all season (the other was a double).

Harrison was 20–23 with a 4.45 ERA in his career for Atlanta when he was dealt to the Cleveland Indians during the 1975 season for pitcher Blue Moon Odom.

== Journeyman ==
Harrison went 7–7 with a 4.79 ERA in nineteen starts for the Indians in 1975. During Spring training 1976, he was dealt to the St. Louis Cardinals for Harry Parker. After one season playing triple A ball for the franchise, he was released. He played minor league ball with the Pittsburgh Pirates and Detroit Tigers before seeing major league experience again with the Minnesota Twins in 1978. In nine games, he was 0–1 with a 7.50 ERA.

== Death ==
Roric Harrison died on September 17, 2023, three days before his 77th birthday.
