= Cincinnati Reds award winners and league leaders =

Cincinnati Reds players who have won MLB awards

This article is a list of baseball players who are Cincinnati Reds players that are winners of Major League Baseball awards and recognitions, Reds awards and recognitions, and/or are league leaders in various statistical areas.

== Award winners ==
=== National League MVP ===
- 1938 – Ernie Lombardi
- 1939 – Bucky Walters
- 1940 – Frank McCormick
- 1961 – Frank Robinson
- 1970 – Johnny Bench
- 1972 – Johnny Bench
- 1973 – Pete Rose
- 1975 – Joe Morgan
- 1976 – Joe Morgan
- 1977 – George Foster
- 1995 – Barry Larkin
- 2010 – Joey Votto

=== National League Cy Young ===
- 2020 – Trevor Bauer

=== National League Rookie of the Year ===
- 1956 – Frank Robinson
- 1963 – Pete Rose
- 1966 – Tommy Helms
- 1968 – Johnny Bench
- 1976 – Pat Zachry
- 1988 – Chris Sabo
- 1999 – Scott Williamson
- 2021 – Jonathan India
- 2026 – Sal Stewart

=== National League Manager of the Year Award ===
See footnote

- 1999 – Jack McKeon

=== Rawlings Gold Glove Award (NL) ===
Pitcher

- Harvey Haddix (1958)
- Bronson Arroyo (2010)

Catcher

- Johnny Edwards [2] (1963–64)
- Johnny Bench [10] (1968–77)
- Tucker Barnhart [2] (2017, 2020)

First base

- Joey Votto (2011)

Second base

- Tommy Helms [2] (1970–71)
- Joe Morgan [5] (1973–77)
- Bret Boone (1998)
- Pokey Reese [2] (1999–2000)
- Brandon Phillips [4] (2008, 2010–11, 2013)

Third base

- Scott Rolen (2010)
- Ke'Bryan Hayes (2025)

Shortstop

- Roy McMillan [3] (1957–59)
- Leo Cárdenas (1965)
- Dave Concepción [5] (1974–77, 1979)
- Barry Larkin [3] (1994–96)

Outfield

- Frank Robinson (1958)
- Vada Pinson (1961)
- Pete Rose [2] (1969–70)
- Cesar Geronimo [4] (1974–77)
- Eric Davis [3] (1987–89)

=== Wilson Defensive Player of the Year Award ===
See explanatory note at Atlanta Braves award winners and league leaders.
Team (all positions)

- Brandon Phillips (2012)
- Jay Bruce (2013)

Pitcher (in MLB)

- Johnny Cueto (2014)

=== Silver Slugger Award (NL) ===
Pitcher
Catcher
First base
Second base

- Joe Morgan (1982)
- Brandon Phillips (2011)

Third base
Shortstop

- Dave Concepción [2] (1981–82)
- Barry Larkin [9] (1988–92, 1995–96, 1998–99)
- Felipe López (2005)
- Elly De La Cruz (2026)

Outfield

- George Foster (1981)
- Dave Parker [2] (1985–86)
- Eric Davis [2] (1987, 1989)
- Jay Bruce [2] (2012–13)

=== All-MLB Team ===
- 2020 – Trevor Bauer (SP; 1st)
- 2021 – Nick Castellanos (OF; 2nd)
- 2026 – Elly De La Cruz (SS; 1st)

=== National League Hank Aaron Award ===
- 2010 – Joey Votto

=== National League Rolaids Relief Man Award ===
- 1976 – Rawly Eastwick
- 1988 – John Franco
- 1996 – Jeff Brantley
- 1997 – Jeff Shaw

=== MLB "This Year in Baseball Awards" ===
Note: These awards were renamed the "GIBBY Awards" in 2010 and then the "Esurance MLB Awards" in 2015.

==== "GIBBY Awards" Best Bounceback Player ====
- 2014 – Johnny Cueto

=== Triple Crown Winner (pitching) ===
- 1939 – Bucky Walters

=== All-Star Game MVP Award ===
Note: This was re-named the Ted Williams Most Valuable Player Award in 2002.

- 1967 – Tony Pérez
- 1972 – Joe Morgan
- 1976 – George Foster
- 1980 – Ken Griffey, Sr.
- 1982 – Dave Concepción

=== MLB All-Century Team (1999) ===
- Johnny Bench – catcher
- Pete Rose – outfielder

=== DHL Hometown Heroes (2006) ===
- Pete Rose — voted by MLB fans as the most outstanding player in the history of the franchise, based on on-field performance, leadership quality and character value

=== MLB All-Time Team (1997; Baseball Writers' Association of America) ===
- Johnny Bench – catcher (first team)
- Joe Morgan – second base (second team/runner-up)

=== Baseball Prospectus Internet Baseball Awards NL Most Valuable Player ===
See: Baseball Prospectus#Internet Baseball Awards

- 2010 – Joey Votto

=== USA Today NL Most Valuable Player ===
- 2010 – Joey Votto

=== Topps All-Star Rookie teams ===
- 1959 Jim O'Toole (left-handed pitcher)
- 1963 Pete Rose (second base) & Tommy Harper (outfield)
- 1964 Bill McCool (left-handed pitcher)
- 1965 Tony Pérez (first base)
- 1966 Tommy Helms (third base)
- 1967 Lee May (first base)
- 1968 Johnny Bench (catcher)
- 1970 Bernie Carbo (outfield)
- 1971 Ross Grimsley (left-handed pitcher)
- 1973 Dan Driessen (third base)
- 1980 Ron Oester (shortstop)
- 1981 Bruce Berenyi (right-handed pitcher)
- 1983 Nick Esasky (third base)
- 1985 Tom Browning (left-handed pitcher)
- 1988 Chris Sabo (third base)
- 1990 Hal Morris (first base)
- 1992 Reggie Sanders (outfield)
- 2001 Adam Dunn (outfield)
- 2002 Austin Kearns (outfield)
- 2008 Joey Votto (first base) & Jay Bruce (outfield)
- 2012 Zack Cozart (shortstop) & Todd Frazier (third base)
- 2014 Billy Hamilton (outfield)
- Note: In 2000, Ken Griffey Jr., at the time an outfielder for the Reds, was one of ten former Topps All-Star Rookies who were featured in a 40th anniversary "special card insert set" put in all of the regular issues of 2000 Topps All-Star Rookie Team sets. Each of the ten cards featured a current player who was a former Topps All-Star Rookie at their position, and on the back of the card was a list of all the Topps All-Star Rookies who were named at that position.

=== USA Today Manager of the Year ===
See footnote

- 2010 – Dusty Baker

== Team championship awards ==
The Reds were National League Champions and/or World Series Champions in more than just these seasons. However, Major League Baseball did not start awarding the NLCS trophy until 1969, and did not start issuing a World Series trophy until 1967. For the Reds' earlier N.L. pennants and World Series championships, see the team's "Awards and achievements" navigation box.

- 1970 – National League Championship Series Trophy
- 1972 – National League Championship Series Trophy
- 1975 – World Series Trophy
- 1976 – World Series Trophy
- 1990 – Warren Giles Trophy (National League champion)
- 1990 – Commissioner's Trophy (World Series)

== Other team awards ==
- 2012 – Baseball America Organization of the Year
- 2014 – Wilson Defensive Team of the Year

== Other achievements ==
=== Cincinnati Reds Players in the National Baseball Hall of Fame ===
See: Cincinnati Reds § Baseball Hall of Famers

=== Cincinnati Reds' Team Most Valuable Player (Cincinnati chapter of Baseball Writers' Association of America (BBWAA)) ===
See: Ernie Lombardi Award and Baseball Writers' Association of America § Chapter awards (BBWAA)

=== Cincinnati Reds' Team Pitcher of the Year (Cincinnati chapter of BBWAA) ===
See: Cincinnati Reds Hall of Fame

=== Cincinnati Reds retired numbers ===
See: Cincinnati Reds § Retired numbers

- 1 – Fred Hutchinson
- 5 – Johnny Bench
- 8 – Joe Morgan
- 10 – Sparky Anderson
- 11 – Barry Larkin
- 13 – Dave Concepción
- 14 – Pete Rose
- 18 – Ted Kluszewski
- 20 – Frank Robinson
- 24 – Tony Pérez
- 42 – Jackie Robinson (retired throughout all of professional baseball on April 15, 1997)

=== Sporting News Sportsman of the Year ===
- 1985 – Pete Rose

=== Hickok Belt ===
See footnote

- 1975 – Pete Rose

=== Fastest Pitch Ever Recorded ===
- On September 24, 2010, against the San Diego Padres, Aroldis Chapman was clocked at 105.1 mph, according to pitch f/x, which makes it the fastest pitch ever recorded in Major League Baseball.

== National League Statistical Leaders ==
=== Batting ===
==== Batting average ====
- 1905 – Cy Seymour (.377)
- 1916 – Hal Chase (.339)
- 1917 – Edd Roush (.341)
- 1919 – Edd Roush (.321)
- 1926 – Bubbles Hargrave (.353)
- 1938 – Ernie Lombardi (.342)
- 1968 – Pete Rose (.335)
- 1969 – Pete Rose (.348)
- 1973 – Pete Rose (.338)

==== On-base percentage ====
- 1917 – Heinie Groh (.385)
- 1918 – Heinie Groh (.395)
- 1926 – Cuckoo Christensen (.426)
- 1962 – Frank Robinson (.421)
- 1968 – Pete Rose (.391)
- 1972 – Joe Morgan (.417)
- 1974 – Joe Morgan (.427)
- 1975 – Joe Morgan (.466)
- 1976 – Joe Morgan (.444)
- 1988 – Kal Daniels (.397)
- 2010 – Joey Votto (.424)
- 2011 – Joey Votto (.416)
- 2013 – Joey Votto (.435)
- 2016 – Joey Votto (.434)
- 2017 – Joey Votto (.454)

==== Slugging percentage ====
- 1905 – Cy Seymour (.559)
- 1918 – Edd Roush (.455)
- 1960 – Frank Robinson (.595)
- 1961 – Frank Robinson (.611)
- 1962 – Frank Robinson (.624)
- 1976 – Joe Morgan (.576)
- 1977 – George Foster (.631)
- 2010 – Joey Votto (.600)

==== OPS ====
- 1905 – Cy Seymour (.988)
- 1918 – Edd Roush (.823)
- 1919 – Heinie Groh (.823)
- 1960 – Frank Robinson (1.002)
- 1961 – Frank Robinson (1.015)
- 1962 – Frank Robinson (1.015)
- 1975 -Joe Morgan (.974)
- 1976 – Joe Morgan (1.020)
- 1977 – George Foster (1.013)
- 2010 – Joey Votto (1.024)

==== Games ====
- 1907 – Miller Huggins (156)
- 1911 – Dick Hoblitzel (158)
- 1915 – Tommy Griffith (160)
- 1915 – Heinie Groh (160)
- 1917 – Heinie Groh (156)
- 1919 – Jake Daubert (140)
- 1922 – George Burns (156)
- 1922 – Jake Daubert (156)
- 1922 – Babe Pinelli (156)
- 1923 – George Burns (154)
- 1952 – Bobby Adams (154)
- 1952 – Roy McMillan (154)
- 1954 – Roy McMillan (154)
- 1955 – Gus Bell (154)
- 1955 – Wally Post (154)
- 1963 – Vada Pinson (162)
- 1964 – Leo Cárdenas (163)
- 1972 – Pete Rose (154)
- 1974 – Pete Rose (163)
- 1975 – Pete Rose (162)
- 1977 – Pete Rose (162)
- 1986 – Dave Parker (162)
- 2002 – Aaron Boone (162)
- 2013 – Joey Votto (162)
- 2017 – Joey Votto (162)

==== At bats ====
- 1910 – Dick Hoblitzel (611)
- 1911 – Dick Hoblitzel (622)
- 1917 – Hal Chase (602)
- 1938 – Frank McCormick (640)
- 1940 – Frank McCormick (618)
- 1944 – Woody Williams (653)
- 1945 – Dain Clay (656)
- 1952 – Bobby Adams (637)
- 1956 – Johnny Temple (632)
- 1959 – Vada Pinson (648)
- 1960 – Vada Pinson (652)
- 1965 – Pete Rose (670)
- 1972 – Pete Rose (645)
- 1973 – Pete Rose (680)
- 1977 – Pete Rose (655)
- 1989 – Todd Benzinger (628)
- 2015 – Todd Frazier (619)

==== Plate appearances ====
- 1911 – Bob Bescher (716)
- 1917 – Heinie Groh (685)
- 1923 – George Burns (724)
- 1944 – Woody Williams (707)
- 1947 – Frank Baumholtz (711)
- 1955 – Ted Kluszewski (686)
- 1959 – Vada Pinson (706)
- 1960 – Vada Pinson (706)
- 1965 – Pete Rose (757)
- 1972 – Pete Rose (729)
- 1973 – Pete Rose (752)
- 1974 – Pete Rose (770)
- 1976 – Pete Rose (759)
- 1977 – Pete Rose (731)
- 1978 – Pete Rose (729)
- 2013 – Joey Votto (726)

==== Runs ====
- 1912 – Bob Bescher (120)
- 1918 – Heinie Groh (86)
- 1939 – Billy Werber (115)
- 1956 – Frank Robinson (122)
- 1959 – Vada Pinson (131)
- 1962 – Frank Robinson (134)
- 1965 – Tommy Harper (126)
- 1972 – Joe Morgan (122)
- 1974 – Pete Rose (110)
- 1975 – Pete Rose (112)
- 1976 – Pete Rose (130)
- 1977 – George Foster (124)

==== Hits ====
- 1905 – Cy Seymour (219)
- 1916 – Hal Chase (184)
- 1917 – Heinie Groh (182)
- 1938 – Frank McCormick (209)
- 1939 – Frank McCormick (209)
- 1940 – Frank McCormick (191)
- 1955 – Ted Kluszewski (192)
- 1961 – Vada Pinson (208)
- 1963 – Vada Pinson (204)
- 1965 – Pete Rose (209)
- 1968 – Pete Rose (210)
- 1970 – Pete Rose (205)
- 1972 – Pete Rose (198)
- 1973 – Pete Rose (230)
- 1976 – Pete Rose (215)

==== Total bases ====
- 1902 – Sam Crawford (256)
- 1905 – Cy Seymour (325)
- 1974 – Johnny Bench (315)
- 1977 – George Foster (388)
- 1985 – Dave Parker (350)
- 1986 – Dave Parker (304)

==== Doubles ====
- 1903 – Harry Steinfeldt (32)
- 1905 – Cy Seymour (40)
- 1917 – Heinie Groh (39)
- 1918 – Heinie Groh (28)
- 1923 – Edd Roush (41)
- 1940 – Frank McCormick (44)
- 1947 – Eddie Miller (38)
- 1957 – Don Hoak (39)
- 1959 – Vada Pinson (47)
- 1960 – Vada Pinson (37)
- 1962 – Frank Robinson (51)
- 1974 – Pete Rose (45)
- 1975 – Pete Rose (47)
- 1976 – Pete Rose (42)
- 1978 – Pete Rose (51)
- 1985 – Dave Parker (42)
- 2011 – Joey Votto (40)

==== Triples ====
- 1890 – John Reilly (26)
- 1902 – Sam Crawford (22)
- 1905 – Cy Seymour (21)
- 1907 – John Ganzel (16)
- 1909 – Mike Mitchell (17)
- 1910 – Mike Mitchell (18)
- 1922 – Jake Daubert (22)
- 1924 – Edd Roush (21)
- 1932 – Babe Herman (19)
- 1935 – Ival Goodman (18)
- 1936 – Ival Goodman (14)
- 1963 – Vada Pinson (14)
- 1967 – Vada Pinson (13)
- 1990 – Mariano Duncan (11)

==== Home runs ====
- 1892 – Bug Holliday (13)
- 1901 – Sam Crawford (16)
- 1905 – Fred Odwell (9)
- 1954 – Ted Kluszewski (49)
- 1970 – Johnny Bench (45)
- 1972 – Johnny Bench (40)
- 1977 – George Foster (52)
- 1978 – George Foster (40)

==== RBI ====
- 1905 – Cy Seymour (121)
- 1918 – Sherry Magee (76)
- 1939 – Frank McCormick (128)
- 1954 – Ted Kluszewski (141)
- 1965 – Deron Johnson (130)
- 1970 – Johnny Bench (148)
- 1972 – Johnny Bench (125)
- 1974 – Johnny Bench (129)
- 1976 – George Foster (121)
- 1977 – George Foster (149)
- 1978 – George Foster (120)
- 1985 – Dave Parker (125)

==== Walks ====
- 1905 – Miller Huggins (103)
- 1907 – Miller Huggins (83)
- 1913 – Bob Bescher (94)
- 1916 – Heinie Groh (84)
- 1923 – George Burns (101)
- 1957 – Johnny Temple (94)
- 1972 – Joe Morgan (115)
- 1975 – Joe Morgan (132)
- 1980 – Dan Driessen (93)
- 2011 – Joey Votto (110)
- 2012 – Joey Votto (94)
- 2013 – Joey Votto (135)
- 2015 – Joey Votto (143)
- 2017 – Joey Votto (134)

==== Strikeouts ====
- 1911 – Bob Bescher (78)
- 1931 – Nick Cullop (86)
- 1948 – Hank Sauer (85)
- 1955 – Wally Post (102)
- 1956 – Wally Post (124)
- 1994 – Reggie Sanders (114)
- 2004 – Adam Dunn (195)
- 2005 – Adam Dunn (168)
- 2006 – Adam Dunn (194)

==== Stolen bases ====
- 1909 – Bob Bescher (54)
- 1910 – Bob Bescher (70)
- 1911 – Bob Bescher (81)
- 1912 – Bob Bescher (67)
- 1940 – Lonny Frey (22)
- 1970 – Bobby Tolan (57)

==== Singles ====
- 1906 – Miller Huggins (141)
- 1917 – Edd Roush (141)
- 1938 – Frank McCormick (160)
- 1952 – Bobby Adams (145)
- 1956 – Johnny Temple (157)
- 1961 – Vada Pinson (150)
- 1973 – Pete Rose (181)

==== Runs created ====
- 1902 – Sam Crawford (99)
- 1905 – Cy Seymour (139)
- 1918 – Heinie Groh (76)
- 1962 – Frank Robinson (158)
- 1968 – Pete Rose (115)
- 1976 – Joe Morgan (123)
- 1977 – George Foster (148)
- 2010 – Joey Votto (144)
- 2013 – Joey Votto (132)
- 2016 – Joey Votto (139)

==== Extra-base hits ====
- 1905 – Cy Seymour (69)
- 1962 – Frank Robinson (92)
- 1970 – Johnny Bench (84)
- 1974 – Johnny Bench (73)
- 1977 – George Foster (85)
- 1985 – Dave Parker (80)

==== Times on base ====
- 1917 – Heinie Groh (261)
- 1918 – Heinie Groh (219)
- 1965 – Pete Rose (286)
- 1968 – Pete Rose (270)
- 1969 – Pete Rose (311)
- 1972 – Joe Morgan (282)
- 1973 – Pete Rose (301)
- 1974 – Pete Rose (296)
- 1975 – Pete Rose (310)
- 1976 – Pete Rose (307)

==== Hit by pitch ====
- 1914 – Heinie Groh (13)
- 1915 – Red Killefer (19)
- 1923 – Bubbles Hargrave (12)
- 1936 – Ival Goodman (9)
- 1938 – Ival Goodman (15)
- 1939 – Ival Goodman (7)
- 1956 – Frank Robinson (20)
- 1959 – Frank Robinson (8)
- 1960 – Frank Robinson (9)
- 1962 – Frank Robinson (11)
- 1963 – Frank Robinson (14)
- 1965 – Frank Robinson (18)
- 1980 – Dan Driessen (6)
- 2013 – Shin Soo Choo (26)

==== Sacrifice hits ====
- 1896 – Dummy Hoy (33)
- 1918 – Edd Roush (33)
- 1919 – Jake Daubert (39)
- 1924 – Babe Pinelli (33)
- 1925 – Babe Pinelli (34)
- 1939 – Lonny Frey (25)
- 1940 – Mike McCormick (20)
- 1954 – Roy McMillan (31)
- 1957 – Johnny Temple (16)
- 1958 – Johnny Temple (17)
- 1969 – Jim Merritt (15)
- 2012 – Johnny Cueto (17)

==== Sacrifice flies ====
- 1959 – Johnny Temple (13)
- 1961 – Frank Robinson (10)
- 1965 – Deron Johnson (10)
- 1970 – Johnny Bench (11)
- 1972 – Johnny Bench (12)
- 1973 – Johnny Bench (10)
- 1976 – Joe Morgan (12)

==== Intentional walks ====
- 1955 – Ted Kluszewski (25)
- 1961 – Frank Robinson (23)
- 1962 – Frank Robinson (16)
- 1963 – Frank Robinson (20)
- 1964 – Frank Robinson (20)
- 1965 – Leo Cárdenas (25)
- 1966 – Leo Cárdenas (18)
- 1972 – Johnny Bench (23)
- 1985 – Dave Parker (24)
- 2012 – Joey Votto (18)
- 2013 – Joey Votto (19)
- 2017 – Joey Votto (20)

==== Grounded into double plays ====
- 1933 – Ernie Lombardi (26)
- 1934 – Ernie Lombardi (24)
- 1938 – Ernie Lombardi (30)
- 1940 – Frank McCormick (23)
- 1941 – Frank McCormick (22)
- 1980 – Ray Knight (24)
- 1981 – Ray Knight (18)
- 1983 – Dave Concepción (21)
- 1985 – Dave Parker (26)
- 2005 – Sean Casey (27)

==== Caught stealing ====
- 1921 – Sam Bohne (22)
- 1925 – Edd Roush (20)
- 1970 – Bobby Tolan (20)
- 2014 – Billy Hamilton (23)

==== At bats per strikeout ====
- 1910 – Hans Lobert (34.9)
- 1917 – Ivey Wingo (30.7)
- 1918 – Edd Roush (43.5)
- 1921 – Edd Roush (52.2)
- 1931 – Edd Roush (75.2)
- 1935 – Ernie Lombardi (55.3)
- 1941 – Frank McCormick (46.4)
- 1988 – Barry Larkin (24.5)
- 2008 – Jeff Keppinger (19.1)

==== At bats per home run ====
- 1892 – Bug Holliday (46.3)
- 1901 – Sam Crawford (32.2)
- 1905 – Fred Odwell (52)
- 1954 – Ted Kluszewski (11.7)
- 1977 – George Foster (11.8)
- 1978 – George Foster (15.1)

==== Outs ====
- 1898 – Tommy Corcoran (481)
- 1907 – Miller Huggins (449)
- 1910 – Dick Hoblitzel (459)
- 1911 – Dick Hoblitzel (464)
- 1917 – Larry Kopf (450)
- 1926 – Hughie Critz (467)
- 1934 – Mark Koenig (491)
- 1940 – Frank McCormick (451)
- 1944 – Woody Williams (513)
- 1945 – Dain Clay (487)
- 1952 – Bobby Adams (489)
- 1960 – Vada Pinson (490)
- 1986 – Dave Parker (493)
- 1989 – Todd Benzinger (498)

=== Pitching ===
==== ERA ====
- 1890 – Billy Rhines (1.95)
- 1896 – Billy Rhines (2.45)
- 1923 – Dolf Luque (1.93)
- 1925 – Dolf Luque (2.63)
- 1939 – Bucky Walters (2.29)
- 1940 – Bucky Walters (2.48)
- 1941 – Elmer Riddle (2.24)
- 1944 – Ed Heusser (2.38)
- 2020 – Trevor Bauer (1.73)

==== Wins ====
- 1922 – Eppa Rixey (25)
- 1923 – Dolf Luque (27)
- 1926 – Pete Donohue (20)
- 1939 – Bucky Walters (27)
- 1940 – Bucky Walters (22)
- 1943 – Elmer Riddle (21)
- 1944 – Bucky Walters (23)
- 1947 – Ewell Blackwell (22)
- 1961 – Joey Jay (21)
- 1981 – Tom Seaver (14)
- 1988 – Danny Jackson (23)
- 2006 – Aaron Harang (16)

==== Win–loss % ====
- 1892 – Mike Sullivan (.750)
- 1919 – Dolf Luque (.769)
- 1923 – Dolf Luque (.771)
- 1939 – Paul Derringer (.781)
- 1941 – Elmer Riddle (.826)
- 1943 – Clyde Shoun (.737)
- 1962 – Bob Purkey (.821)
- 1970 – Wayne Simpson (.824)
- 1972 – Gary Nolan (.750)
- 1981 – Tom Seaver (.875)
- 1991 – José Rijo (.714)

==== WHIP ====
- 1890 – Billy Rhines (1.121)
- 1896 – Billy Rhines (1.231)
- 1925 – Dolf Luque (1.172)
- 1929 – Red Lucas (1.204)
- 1939 – Bucky Walters (1.125)
- 1940 – Bucky Walters (1.092)
- 1951 – Ken Raffensberger (1.086)
- 1982 – Mario Soto (1.060)
- 1991 – José Rijo (1.077)
- 2020 – Trevor Bauer (0.795)

==== Hits allowed/9IP ====
- 1892 – Tony Mullane (6.77)
- 1896 – Billy Rhines (8.06)
- 1920 – Dolf Luque (7.28)
- 1923 – Dolf Luque (7.80)
- 1925 – Dolf Luque (8.13)
- 1929 – Red Lucas (8.90)
- 1938 – Johnny Vander Meer (7.07)
- 1939 – Bucky Walters (7.05)
- 1940 – Bucky Walters (7.11)
- 1941 – Johnny Vander Meer (6.84)
- 1944 – Bucky Walters (7.36)
- 1950 – Ewell Blackwell (7.00)
- 1970 – Wayne Simpson (6.39)
- 1980 – Mario Soto (5.96)

==== Walks/9IP ====
- 1904 – Noodles Hahn (1.06)
- 1910 – George Suggs (1.62)
- 1924 – Rube Benton (1.33)
- 1926 – Pete Donohue (1.23)
- 1933 – Red Lucas (.74)
- 1939 – Paul Derringer (1.05)
- 1940 – Paul Derringer (1.46)
- 1950 – Ken Raffensberger (1.51)
- 1951 – Ken Raffensberger (1.38)
- 1959 – Don Newcombe (1.09)
- 1967 – Milt Pappas (1.57)
- 1975 – Gary Nolan (1.24)
- 1976 – Gary Nolan (1.02)

==== Strikeouts/9IP ====
- 1919 – Hod Eller (4.97)
- 1941 – Johnny Vander Meer (8.03)
- 1942 – Johnny Vander Meer (6.86)
- 1943 – Johnny Vander Meer (5.42)
- 1947 – Ewell Blackwell (6.36)
- 1950 – Ewell Blackwell (6.48)
- 1963 – Jim Maloney (9.53)
- 1967 – Gary Nolan (8.18)
- 1980 – Mario Soto (8.61)
- 1982 – Mario Soto (9.57)
- 1993 – José Rijo (7.94)

==== Games ====
- 1912 – Rube Benton (50)
- 1936 – Paul Derringer (51)
- 1948 – Harry Gumbert (61)
- 1967 – Ted Abernathy (70)
- 1968 – Ted Abernathy (78)
- 1969 – Wayne Granger (90)
- 1971 – Wayne Granger (70)
- 1984 – Ted Power (78)
- 1988 – Rob Murphy (76)

==== Saves ====
- 1893 – Frank Dwyer (2)
- 1895 – Tom Parrott (3)
- 1910 – Harry Gaspar (7)
- 1914 – Red Ames (6)
- 1924 – Jakie May (6)
- 1940 – Joe Beggs (7)
- 1948 – Harry Gumbert (17)
- 1967 – Ted Abernathy (28)
- 1970 – Wayne Granger (35)
- 1972 – Clay Carroll (37)
- 1975 – Rawly Eastwick (22)
- 1976 – Rawly Eastwick (26)
- 1988 – John Franco (39)
- 1996 – Jeff Brantley (44)
- 1997 – Jeff Shaw (42)

==== Innings ====
- 1901 – Noodles Hahn (375 1/3)
- 1922 – Eppa Rixey (313 1/3)
- 1925 – Pete Donohue (301)
- 1926 – Pete Donohue (285 2/3)
- 1938 – Paul Derringer (307)
- 1939 – Bucky Walters (319)
- 1940 – Bucky Walters (305)
- 1941 – Bucky Walters (302)
- 1973 – Jack Billingham (293 1/3)
- 2006 – Bronson Arroyo (240 2/3)

==== Strikeouts ====
- 1899 – Noodles Hahn (145)
- 1900 – Noodles Hahn (132)
- 1901 – Noodles Hahn (239)
- 1939 – Bucky Walters (137)
- 1941 – Johnny Vander Meer (202)
- 1942 – Johnny Vander Meer (186)
- 1943 – Johnny Vander Meer (174)
- 1947 – Ewell Blackwell (193)
- 1993 – José Rijo (227)
- 2006 – Aaron Harang (216)
- 2014 – Johnny Cueto (242)

==== Games started ====
- 1912 – Rube Benton (39)
- 1922 – Eppa Rixey (38)
- 1925 – Pete Donohue (38)
- 1926 – Pete Donohue (38)
- 1928 – Eppa Rixey (37)
- 1936 – Paul Derringer (37)
- 1938 – Paul Derringer (37)
- 1939 – Bucky Walters (36)
- 1940 – Paul Derringer (37)
- 1943 – Johnny Vander Meer (36)
- 1949 – Ken Raffensberger (38)
- 1973 – Jack Billingham (40)
- 1981 – Mario Soto (25)
- 1986 – Tom Browning (39)
- 1988 – Tom Browning (36)
- 1989 – Tom Browning (37)
- 1990 – Tom Browning (35)
- 1993 – José Rijo (36)
- 1994 – José Rijo (36)
- 2006 – Bronson Arroyo (35)
- 2006 – Aaron Harang (35)
- 2012 – Johnny Cueto (33)
- 2014 – Johnny Cueto (34)

==== Complete games ====
- 1901 – Noodles Hahn (41)
- 1925 – Pete Donohue (27)
- 1926 – Carl Mays (24)
- 1929 – Red Lucas (28)
- 1931 – Red Lucas (24)
- 1932 – Red Lucas (28)
- 1938 – Paul Derringer (26)
- 1939 – Bucky Walters (31)
- 1940 – Bucky Walters (29)
- 1941 – Bucky Walters (27)
- 1947 – Ewell Blackwell (23)
- 1983 – Mario Soto (18)
- 1984 – Mario Soto (13)
- 1988 – Danny Jackson (15)
- 2006 – Aaron Harang (6)
- 2020 – Trevor Bauer (2)

==== Shutouts ====
- 1900 – Noodles Hahn (4)
- 1921 – Dolf Luque (3)
- 1923 – Dolf Luque (6)
- 1924 – Eppa Rixey (4)
- 1925 – Dolf Luque (4)
- 1926 – Pete Donohue (5)
- 1928 – Red Lucas (4)
- 1937 – Lee Grissom (5)
- 1946 – Ewell Blackwell (5)
- 1949 – Ken Raffensberger (5)
- 1952 – Ken Raffensberger (6)
- 1955 – Joe Nuxhall (5)
- 1961 – Joey Jay (4)
- 1966 – Jim Maloney (5)
- 1973 – Jack Billingham (7)
- 1979 – Tom Seaver (5)
- 2009 – Bronson Arroyo (2)
- 2020 – Trevor Bauer (2)

==== Home runs allowed ====
- 1894 – Frank Dwyer (27)
- 1950 – Ken Raffensberger (34)
- 1960 – Jay Hook (31)
- 1966 – Sammy Ellis (35)
- 1969 – Jim Merritt (33)
- 1976 – Gary Nolan (28)
- 1981 – Mario Soto (13)
- 1983 – Mario Soto (28)
- 1985 – Mario Soto (30)
- 1988 – Tom Browning (36)
- 1989 – Tom Browning (31)
- 1991 – Tom Browning (32)
- 2005 – Eric Milton (40)

==== Walks allowed ====
- 1915 – Gene Dale (107)
- 1917 – Pete Schneider (117)
- 1918 – Pete Schneider (117)
- 1943 – Johnny Vander Meer (162)
- 1948 – Johnny Vander Meer (124)
- 1949 – Herm Wehmeier (117)
- 1950 – Herm Wehmeier (135)
- 1952 – Herm Wehmeier (103)
- 1981 – Bruce Berenyi (77)

==== Hits Allowed ====
- 1912 – George Suggs (320)
- 1922 – Eppa Rixey (337)
- 1926 – Pete Donohue (298)
- 1928 – Eppa Rixey (317)
- 1936 – Paul Derringer (331)
- 1938 – Paul Derringer (315)
- 1939 – Paul Derringer (321)
- 1941 – Bucky Walters (292)
- 1949 – Ken Raffensberger (289)
- 1989 – Rick Mahler (242)

==== Strikeout to walk ====
- 1901 – Noodles Hahn (3.46)
- 1939 – Paul Derringer (3.66)
- 1947 – Ewell Blackwell (2.03)
- 1958 – Harvey Haddix (2.56)
- 1976 – Gary Nolan (4.19)
- 1982 – Mario Soto (3.86)

==== Losses ====
- 1914 – Red Ames (23)
- 1915 – Pete Schneider (19)
- 1922 – Dolf Luque (23)
- 1930 – Benny Frey (18)
- 1931 – Si Johnson (19)
- 1932 – Ownie Carroll (19)
- 1934 – Si Johnson (22)
- 1949 – Howie Fox (19)
- 1951 – Ken Raffensberger (17)
- 1951 – Willie Ramsdell (17)
- 1982 – Bruce Berenyi (18)
- 1984 – Jeff Russell (18)

==== Earned runs allowed ====
- 1901 – Bill Phillips (145)
- 1918 – Pete Schneider (85)
- 1934 – Si Johnson (125)
- 1936 – Paul Derringer (126)
- 1950 – Herm Wehmeier (145)
- 1965 – Sammy Ellis (111)
- 1966 – Sammy Ellis (130)
- 1969 – Jim Merritt (122)
- 1991 – Tom Browning (107)
- 1992 – Tim Belcher (99)
- 2005 – Eric Milton (134)

==== Wild pitches ====
- 1900 – Ed Scott (11)
- 1904 – Jack Harper (12)
- 1927 – Jakie May (8)
- 1943 – Bucky Walters (8)
- 1949 – Herm Wehmeier (7)
- 1950 – Ewell Blackwell (11)
- 1950 – Herm Wehmeier (11)
- 1951 – Willie Ramsdell (9)
- 1963 – Jim Maloney (19)
- 1969 – Jim Maloney (16)
- 1997 – Mike Remlinger (12)
- 2007 – Aaron Harang (12)

==== Hit batsmen ====
- 1904 – Tom Walker (18)
- 1907 – Jake Weimer (23)
- 1910 – Harry Gaspar (15)
- 1911 – Art Fromme (16)
- 1912 – Rube Benton (18)
- 1927 – Jakie May (14)
- 1932 – Ownie Carroll (9)
- 1948 – Kent Peterson (6)
- 1950 – Ewell Blackwell (13)
- 1951 – Ewell Blackwell (9)
- 1952 – Frank Smith (7)
- 1952 – Herm Wehmeier (7)
- 1956 – Johnny Klippstein (10)
- 1962 – Bob Purkey (14)
- 1968 – George Culver (14)
- 1977 – Jack Billingham (10)
- 1989 – Rick Mahler (10)
- 2008 – Johnny Cueto (14)
- 2008 – Edinson Vólquez (14)

==== Batters faced ====
- 1912 – Rube Benton (1,302)
- 1922 – Eppa Rixey (1,303)
- 1926 – Pete Donohue (1,191)
- 1938 – Paul Derringer (1,263)
- 1939 – Bucky Walters (1,283)
- 1940 – Bucky Walters (1,207)
- 2006 – Aaron Harang (993)

==== Games finished ====
- 1896 – Chauncey Fisher (11)
- 1897 – Red Ehret (11)
- 1898 – Bill Dammann (13)
- 1905 – Charlie Chech (13)
- 1917 – Hod Eller (21)
- 1924 – Jakie May (21)
- 1940 – Joe Beggs (27)
- 1948 – Harry Gumbert (46)
- 1956 – Hersh Freeman (47)
- 1967 – Ted Abernathy (61)
- 1969 – Wayne Granger (55)
- 1970 – Wayne Granger (59)
- 1980 – Tom Hume (62)
- 1987 – John Franco (60)
- 1988 – John Franco (61)
- 2007 – David Weathers (60)

== See also ==
- Arizona Fall League § Stenson Award
- Baseball awards
- Baseball statistics
- List of MLB awards
