= Gordy Coleman =

American baseball player (1934–1994)

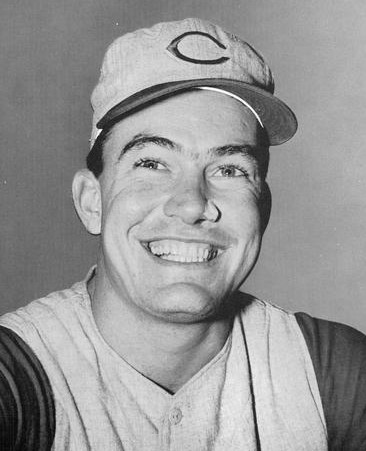
- Coleman in 1961
- First baseman
- Born: July 5, 1934; Rockville, Maryland, U.S.
- Died: March 12, 1994 (aged 59); Cincinnati, Ohio, U.S.
- Batted: Left Threw: Right

MLB debut
- September 19, 1959, for the Cleveland Indians

Last MLB appearance
- May 3, 1967, for the Cincinnati Reds

MLB statistics
- Batting average: .273
- Home runs: 98
- Runs batted in: 387
- Stats at Baseball Reference

Teams
- Cleveland Indians (1959); Cincinnati Reds (1960–1967)

Career highlights and awards
- Cincinnati Reds Hall of Fame

Gordon Calvin Coleman (July 5, 1934 – March 12, 1994) was an American professional baseball first baseman. He played in Major League Baseball with the Cleveland Indians and Cincinnati Reds. He helped the Reds win the 1961 National League pennant, and was inducted into the Cincinnati Reds Hall of Fame in 1972. In 1966, he led all Major League Baseball with a .368 average as a pinch-hitter.

In nine Major League seasons, he appeared in 773 games, totaled 98 home runs, 387 runs batted in, and compiled a .273 batting average.

== Early life ==
Gordy Coleman was born July 5, 1934, in Rockville, Maryland, located in Montgomery County. He was a star athlete at Richard Montgomery High School, earning letters in baseball, football, basketball, and track. He was an All-State end in football his junior or senior year, and was invited to play in a national high school all-star game, but could not attend once they learned he was only a junior. Coleman led the school's basketball team to the state semifinals his senior year, and in baseball he excelled as both a pitcher and a hitter.

Coleman's high school baseball coach went to school in Minnesota, and Coleman followed him to play summer baseball in Minnesota in 1951 and 1952. He played semi-pro baseball in Brainerd, Minnesota for the Brainerd Braves, along with future major league pitcher Herb Score. Coleman played first base for the Braves and led the team in batting average in 1951. Score's presence drew major league scouts and Coleman was also approached about playing major league baseball. He told the scouts he wanted to go to college first. On his 18th birthday in 1952, Coleman hit three home runs, a double and four singles, while playing two games for the Braves that day.

He attended Duke University on a football scholarship, playing both baseball and football as a freshman. He had about 30 football scholarship offers, but chose Duke because baseball was also an important sport played there. He attended Duke for one year before turning to professional baseball in 1953. He had decided that if he was still offered a professional baseball contract after one year at Duke, he would pursue baseball.

== Professional career ==
=== Minor leagues and military service ===
Coleman was signed as an amateur free agent by the Cleveland Indians in August 1953. He was a first baseman in college, but the Indians wanted to convert him into an outfielder. He was assigned to the Reading Indians of the Eastern League, where he played in 13 games. His Reading teammates included future Major League manager Joe Altobelli, and Major Leaguers Score and Rocky Colavito, under future Major League manager Kerby Farrell.

His first full minor league season came in 1954, as an outfielder for the Spartanburg Peaches of the Class B Tri-State League. He had a .318 batting average, with 13 home runs, 100 runs batted in (RBI), 93 runs scored, and an .852 OPS (on-base plus slugging). He had a .953 fielding percentage as an outfielder, with 228 putouts, 18 assists and 12 errors. Coleman had a conventional batting stance prior to this season, but changed his stance so he could deal with inside pitches, which he otherwise could not handle.

In 1955, he played almost the entire season for Cleveland's Class B affiliate in the Illinois-Indiana-Iowa League (Three-I League), the Keokuk Kernels. Coleman missed 27 games after undergoing an emergency appendectomy. In 93 games, he hit .349, with 16 home runs, 77 RBIs, 78 runs scored and a .925 OPS. However, his fielding percentage in the outfield fell to .920, with 12 errors and 11 assists. The Kernels were Three-I League champions with a 92–34 record, winning the league title by 22 games. In addition to Coleman, the team included future Major League Baseball (MLB) players, Jim "Mudcat" Grant, Norm Cash, Russ Nixon and Tony Kubek. Coleman was the only Kernel player named to the Three-I first-team All-Star team.

Coleman was invited to Cleveland's spring training in 1956, after which he was assigned to the Mobile Bears of the Double-A Southern Association. Coleman found his prior two minor league seasons frustrating as an outfielder, but was converted back to playing as a first baseman in the spring of 1956. He hit .316, with 27 home runs, 118 RBIs, 83 runs and an .875 OPS. He had a .988 fielding percentage at first base.

He was out of baseball in 1957 and 1958 while serving in the U.S. Army at Fort McPherson, Georgia.

Coleman returned to baseball in 1959, again assigned by Cleveland to the Mobile Bears of the Southern Association. He won the Southern Association's Triple Crown with 30 home runs, 110 RBIs and a .353 batting average, and was named the Southern Association's Most Valuable Player. He had a .989 fielding percentage playing first base.

=== Major leagues ===
Coleman made his Major League debut for the Indians on September 19, 1959 at age 25 in a game hosted by the Kansas City Athletics and won by the Indians, 13–7. In one at-bat as a pinch hitter, he got his first big-league hit, a fifth-inning triple off Bob Grim. He had only 16 plate appearances in six games, but batted .533. These were his only games for Cleveland. On December 15, 1959, Coleman was traded along with Billy Martin and Cal McLish to the Cincinnati Reds for Johnny Temple.

In 1960 he split time with the Reds, for whom he played 66 games, and the Reds' Triple-A affiliate Seattle Rainiers of the Pacific Coast League. He began the season in Seattle and hit .324, with 10 home runs, 60 RBIs, 54 runs scored and an .894 OPS for the Rainiers; with a .991 fielding percentage at first base. The Reds called him up in late July. With the Reds, he hit .271, with six home runs, 32 RBIs, 26 runs scored and a .699 OPS; and he had a .998 fielding percentage at first base. Coleman took over at first base for the Reds, and future Hall of Fame outfielder Frank Robinson moved to left field, replacing Wally Post. He hit a home run in his first at bat for the Reds.

The Reds won the National League title in 1961, with a 93–51 record. Coleman played his first full major league season, as the Reds first baseman. He hit .287, with 26 home runs (tied for second on the team to Frank Robinson's 37), a career-high 87 RBIs and an .845 OPS. He had a .991 fielding percentage at first base, and started 140 games for the Reds (in a 154 game season). The Reds lost the 1961 World Series to the New York Yankees, four games to one. Coleman batted .250 (5 for 20) with one home run and two runs batted in. His two-run home run came in game 2 at Yankee Stadium in the fourth inning off starting pitcher Ralph Terry in a 6–2 Reds' win, their only one of the series.

In 1962, Coleman hit a career-high 28 home runs, to go along with 86 RBIs, a .277 batting average and .816 OPS. He started 121 of the 128 games in which he played in the National League's first 162-game season. In 1963, he only played in 105 games, starting 94. He hit .247 with 14 home runs and 59 RBIs. Coleman hit .400 as a pinch-hitter in 1963.

Coleman was the Reds' starting first baseman in the 1961 through 1963 seasons for the majority of the team's games in each season. Beginning in 1964, he began to split time at first base; first with Deron Johnson and later Tony Pérez. In 1964, Johnson started 106 games at first base for the Reds, with Coleman only starting 48. Johnson hit .273 with 21 home runs and 79 RBIs; and Coleman hit .242 with five home runs and 27 RBIs.

In 1965, the Reds moved Johnson to third base. Coleman started 87 games at first base, with future Hall of Famer Pérez starting 66 games at first base in his rookie season. Coleman hit a career-high .302, with 14 home runs and 57 RBIs, while Pérez hit .260 with 12 home runs and 47 RBIs. In 1966, he started only 63 games at first base, and hit .251 with five home runs and 37 RBI. Pérez started 62 games, with a .265 average, four home runs and 39 RBIs. Rookie and future All-Star Lee May started 16 games at first base, and hit .333 in 75 at bats; and Johnson played 11 games at first base.

In 1966, he led all Major League Baseball with a .368 average as a pinch-hitter.

1967 was the 33-year old Coleman's final year in the Major Leagues and professional baseball. Johnson and May were now splitting time at first base, with Pérez playing third base for the Reds. Coleman only played in four games for the Reds, with eight plate appearances. The Reds assigned him to the Triple-A Buffalo Bisons of the International League, where he hit .198 in 34 games. He finished the 1967 season with the Los Angeles Dodgers' Triple-A affiliate the Spokane Indians in the Pacific Coast League, hitting .195 in only 91 plate appearances.

Over his career, Coleman had a .273 batting average, with 98 home runs, 387 RBIs, 282 runs scored and a .772 OPS. Over a six-year period with the Reds, he was 40 for 117 (.342) as a pinch-hitter. He was not known as a good fielder (though he had a career .990 fielding percentage at first base), and had an unconventional batting style, hitting with one foot "in the bucket".

== Honors ==
In 1972, he was selected to join the Cincinnati Reds Hall of Fame.

== Baseball executive and broadcaster ==
Coleman served as a minor league manager for a short time in Spokane at the end of the 1967 season. After his playing career ended, beginning in 1968, Coleman worked for many years in public relations for the Cincinnati Reds as director of the team's speakers bureau, making thousands of appearances speaking at civic and other organizations' events, and interacting with local newspapers. He focused on a four-state area known as "Reds Country" (Ohio, Kentucky, Indiana and West Virginia), and would travel thousands of miles each year. Coleman had given over 2,000 talks for the Reds by his first ten years as head of the speakers bureau. He also served as a color commentator on Reds television broadcasts from 1990 to 1993.

== Personal life and death ==
Coleman married Marian Huggins (b. 1934) on October 12, 1955; she still resides in Cincinnati. They had a son, Shawn.

Coleman died of a heart attack at age 59 on March 12, 1994, in Cincinnati, Ohio. The city of his birth, Rockville, Maryland, declared July 5, 2008, (what would have been his 74th birthday) Gordy Coleman Day after a group of Richard Montgomery High School alumni sought to raise funds for a new baseball field scoreboard and plaque commemorating Coleman's life and to name the field in his honor. Coleman was especially known for his humble, genial and respectful nature. In his thousands of speaker engagements, he never told off-color or ethnically based stories, but rather spoke in a manner that would be acceptable to everyone.
