= Bubbles Hargrave =

American baseball player (1892–1969)

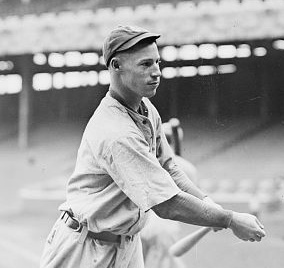
- Catcher
- Born: July 15, 1892; New Haven, Indiana, U.S.
- Died: February 23, 1969 (aged 76); Cincinnati, Ohio, U.S.
- Batted: Right Threw: Right

MLB debut
- September 18, 1913, for the Chicago Cubs

Last MLB appearance
- September 6, 1930, for the New York Yankees

MLB statistics
- Batting average: .310
- Home runs: 29
- Runs batted in: 376
- Stats at Baseball Reference

Teams
- Chicago Cubs (1913–1915); Cincinnati Reds (1921–1928); New York Yankees (1930)

Career highlights and awards
- NL batting champion (1926); Cincinnati Reds Hall of Fame

Eugene Franklin "Bubbles" Hargrave (July 15, 1892 – February 23, 1969) was an American catcher in Major League Baseball who played for the Chicago Cubs, Cincinnati Reds, and New York Yankees. He won the National League batting title in 1926 while playing for Cincinnati. He was nicknamed "Bubbles" because he stuttered when saying "B" sounds. Bubbles' younger brother, Pinky Hargrave, was also a major league catcher.

== Career ==
Hargrave was born in New Haven, Indiana. He started his professional baseball career in 1911 in the Central League and made his major league debut in 1913 with the Chicago Cubs. He was their backup catcher until 1915. From 1916 to 1920, he played mostly in the American Association. In 1920, he had a big season with the St. Paul Saints, batting .335 with 22 home runs and finishing second in the league batting race. St. Paul won the pennant.

Hargrave was then acquired by the Cincinnati Reds. He was their starting catcher for most of the 1920s and consistently put up good hitting numbers. In 1926, he won the National League batting title with a .353 average. The rules at the time required batting champions to play in at least 100 games, and Hargrave pinch hit several times to get to 105. He was the first catcher to lead the NL in batting average. In 1927, he led the league's catchers in fielding percentage.

Hargrave went back to St. Paul for the 1929 season. He managed the club to a second-place finish and also made the league All-Star team. He batted .369 in 104 games. The following year, Hargrave served as a backup catcher for the New York Yankees. He then went back to the minors for a few seasons before retiring in 1934.

== Later life ==
After his baseball career, Hargrave became a supervisor for the William Powell Valve Company in Cincinnati, Ohio. Hargrave died at the Emerson A. Norrth Hospital in the College Hill section of Cincinnati on February 23, 1969, age 76. Hargrave and Ted Kluszewski were elected by fans to the Cincinnati Reds Hall of Fame in July 1962. He was posthumously inducted into the Indiana Baseball Hall of Fame in January 2005.

== See also ==
- List of Major League Baseball batting champions
- Cincinnati Reds award winners and league leaders
