= Cincinnati Reds Hall of Fame and Museum =

Entity established by Major League Baseball's Cincinnati Reds franchise

Coordinates: 39.09718°N 84.50840°W

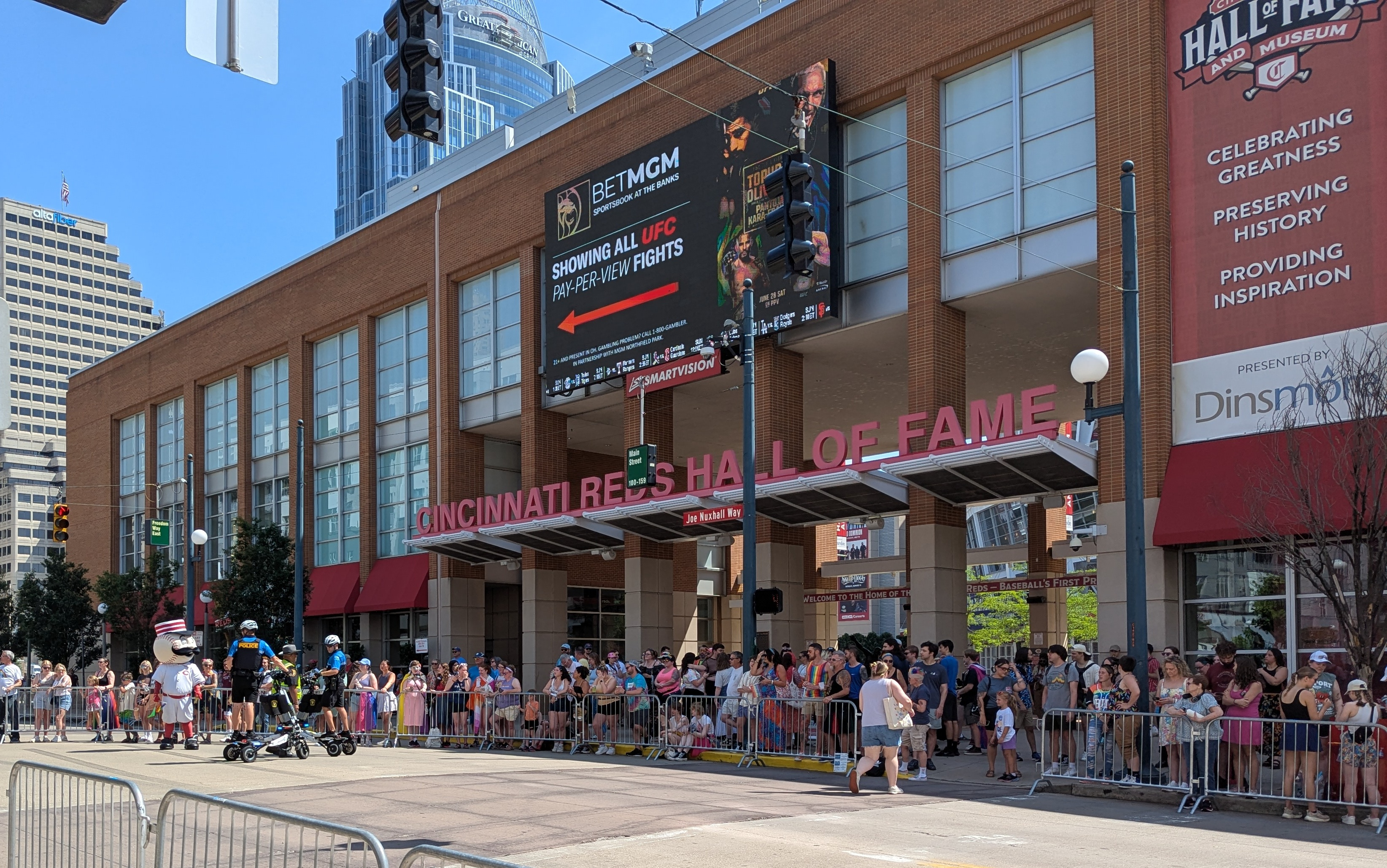
The Hall of Fame during the 2025 Cincinnati Pride parade

The Cincinnati Reds Hall of Fame and Museum is an entity established by Major League Baseball's Cincinnati Reds franchise that pays homage to the team's past through displays, photographs and multimedia. It was instituted in 1958 to recognize the career of former Cincinnati Reds players, managers and front-office executives, but did not have a physical facility until 2004. It is adjacent to Great American Ball Park on the banks of the Ohio River. Currently, the Hall of Fame section is home to 97 inductees. These inductees include players, managers & executives who were involved in Cincinnati's baseball legacy, which dates back to 1869, the year the original Cincinnati Red Stockings took the field. Inductions take place every other year.

== History ==
The Reds first teamed up with the Cincinnati Chapter of Commerce in 1958 to promote the inductions, which were voted on by Reds fans. Nevertheless, no induction took place in 1985, and starting in 1989, the discontinuation of the ceremonies lasted for nine years. In 1998, Reds executive John Allen revived the inductions and turned over voting to the local chapter of the Baseball Writers' Association of America, which also votes annually for the team's Most Valuable Player and pitcher. The museum opened September 25, 2004, next to Great American Ball Park. It has more than 15,000 square feet (1,400 m^{2}) of exhibit space on two floors and is open year-round. The museum showcases such unique items such as World Series trophies (from 1975, 1976 and 1990), the scorebook from the 1869 Cincinnati Red Stockings (baseball's first professional team), MVP trophies of Johnny Bench and Joe Morgan, a gallery of the Reds Hall of Fame plaques and other items. Rick Walls took over the role of museum executive director on August 1, 2007, for Greg Rhodes (the museum's first executive director), who remained with the Cincinnati Reds as team historian.

== Past exhibits ==
In 2010 The Hall featured a Pete Rose Exhibit, focusing on the playing career of baseball's all time hits leader, during his life under a lifetime ban from baseball. Artifacts include: the bat and ball from hit 4192; balls from hits leading up to 4192; artifacts from the Crosley and Riverfront/Cinergy years; gloves that Rose wore playing outfield, 2nd base, 3rd base, and 1st base; a uniform shirt from Rose's High School (Western Hills – also the alma mater of major leaguers Don Zimmer, Eddie Brinkman, Russ Nixon, and others); baseball cards from Rose's career; Sports Illustrated covers of Rose; the "wall of balls" representing all 4256 of Rose's hits; and other items.

In 2009 the museum launched its Crosley Field exhibit honoring the team's former ballpark.

The Reds Hall of Fame unveiled a statue of Hall of Famer Johnny Bench on September 17, 2011. The statue of Bench, one of the stars of the Big Red Machine, features him in a throwing motion toward an imaginary second base. September 17, was the anniversary of Johnny Bench Night at Riverfront Stadium in 1983, when Bench hit a two-run, game tying home run in the third inning.

== Cincinnati Reds Hall of Fame members ==
Key
Year	Year inducted
**Bold**	Member of the Baseball Hall of Fame
†	Member of the Baseball Hall of Fame as a Red
**Bold**	Recipient of the Hall of Fame's Ford C. Frick Award

Year	No.	Inductee	Position	Tenure
1958	30	Paul Derringer	P	1933–1942
1958	4	**Ernie Lombardi**^{†}	C	1932–1941
1958	10	Frank McCormick	1B	1934–1945
1958	33	Johnny Vander Meer	P	1937–1943; 1946–1949
1958	31	Bucky Walters	P/3B; Manager	1938–1948; 1948–1949
1959	24	Ival Goodman	RF	1935–1942
1959	18	**Eppa Rixey**^{†}	P	1921–1933
1960	44, 47	Ewell Blackwell	P	1942, 1946–1952
1960	—	**Edd Roush**^{†}	CF	1916–1926, 1931
1961	11	Lonny Frey	2B/SS	1938–1946
1961	18	Billy Werber	3B	1939–1941
1962	—	Hughie Critz	2B	1924–1930
1962	—	Bubbles Hargrave	C	1921–1928
1962	18	Ted Kluszewski	1B; Coach	1947–1957; 1970–1978, 1983
1963	—	Rube Bressler	LF/P	1917–1927
1963	23	Harry Craft	CF	1937–1942
1963	—	Heinie Groh	3B	1913–1921
1963	—	Noodles Hahn	P	1899–1905
1964	25	Gus Bell	OF	1953–1961
1964	—	Pete Donohue	P	1921–1930
1965	1	Fred Hutchinson	Manager	1959–1964
1965	—	Larry Kopf	SS	1916–1917; 1919–1921
1965	12	Red Lucas	P	1926–1933
1965	25, 28, 29	Wally Post	RF	1949, 1951–1957; 1960–1963
1965	5, 16	Johnny Temple	2B	1952–1959, 1964
1966	—	Jake Daubert	1B	1919–1924
1966	20	Mike McCormick	OF	1940–1943, 1946
1966	12	Billy Myers	SS	1935–1940
1967	—	Dolf Luque	P	1918–1929
1967	1	**Bill McKechnie**^{†}	3B; Manager	1916–1917; 1938–1946
1968	—	**Sam Crawford**	OF	1899–1902
1968	39, 41, 43	Joe Nuxhall	P Broadcaster	1944, 1952–1960; 1962–1966; 1967–2007
1969	—	**Warren Giles**	President/GM	1937–1951
1970	31	Jim O'Toole	P	1958–1966
1971	11	Roy McMillan	SS	1951–1960
1972	18	Gordy Coleman	1B	1960–1967
1973	46	Jim Maloney	P	1960–1970
1974	37	Bob Purkey	P	1958–1964
1975	7, 12	Smoky Burgess	C	1955–1958
1976	46	Brooks Lawrence	P	1956–1960
1977	5, 28	Vada Pinson	OF	1958–1968
1978	20	**Frank Robinson**	OF	1956–1965
1979	19, 50	Tommy Helms	2B; Manager	1964–1971; 1988–1989
1980	36	Clay Carroll	P	1968–1975
1981	16, 17	Leo Cárdenas	SS	1960–1968
1982	37	Wayne Granger	P	1969–1971
1983	38	Gary Nolan	P	1967–1977
1984	43	Jack Billingham	P	1972–1977
1986	5	**Johnny Bench**^{†}	C	1967–1983
1987	8	**Joe Morgan**^{†}	2B	1972–1979
1988	24	Jerry Lynch	OF	1957–1963
1998	24	**Tony Pérez**^{†}	1B; Manager	1964–1976; 1984–1986; 1993
1998	—	Cy Seymour	OF/P	1902–1906
2000	10	**Sparky Anderson**^{†}	Manager	1970–1978
2000	13	Dave Concepción	SS	1970–1988
2001	—	Bob Ewing	OF/P	1902–1909
2001	36	Mario Soto	P	1977–1988
2002	35	Don Gullett	P	1970–1976
2002	—	**Bid McPhee**^{†}	2B	1882–1899
2003	15	George Foster	LF	1971–1981
2003	—	Dummy Hoy	CF	1894–1897, 1902
2004	30	Ken Griffey Sr.	OF	1973–1981; 1988–1990
2004	—	Bob Howsam	GM	1967–1977
2004	—	Will White	P	1882–1886
2005	44	Eric Davis	OF	1984–1991, 1996
2005	27	José Rijo	P	1988–1995; 2001–2002
2005	—	**George Wright**	SS	1869–1870
2005	—	**Harry Wright**	CF/Manager	1866–1870
2006	32	Tom Browning	P	1984–1994
2006	23	Lee May	1B	1965–1971
2006	41	**Tom Seaver**	P	1977–1982
2008	20	César Gerónimo	CF	1972–1980
2008	—	August Herrmann	President	1902–1927
2008	30	Joey Jay	P	1961–1966
2008	11	**Barry Larkin**^{†}	SS	1986–2004
2010	34	Pedro Borbón	P	1970–1979
2010	17	Chris Sabo	3B	1988–1993, 1996
2010	—	Tony Mullane	P	1886–1893
2012	21	Sean Casey	1B	1998–2005
2012	22	Dan Driessen	1B	1973–1984
2012	—	John Reilly	1B	1883–1891
2014	3, 30	**Ken Griffey Jr.**	CF	2000–2008
2014	39	**Dave Parker**	RF	1984–1987
2014	16	Ron Oester	2B	1978–1990
2014	—	**Jake Beckley**	1B	1897–1903
2016	14	Pete Rose	OF, IF; Manager	1963–1978; 1984–1986; 1984–1989
2018	44	Adam Dunn	LF/1B	2001–2008
2018	32	Fred Norman	P	1973–1979
2018	4	Dave Bristol	Manager	1966–1969
2021	—	**Marty Brennaman**	Broadcaster	1974–2019
2023	32	Danny Graves	P	1997–2005
2023	61	Bronson Arroyo	P	2006–2013, 2017
2023	—	Gabe Paul	General manager	1951–1960
2026	39	Aaron Harang	P	2003–2010
2026	4	Brandon Phillips	2B	2006–2016
2026	53, 16	Reggie Sanders	OF	1991–1998
2026	41	Lou Piniella	Manager	1990–1992

== See also ==
- Cincinnati Reds award winners and league leaders
