= Leo Cárdenas =

Cuban baseball player (born 1938)

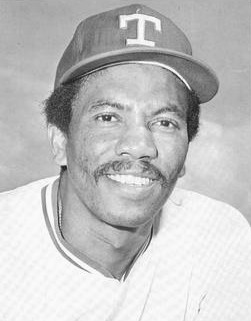
- Cárdenas in 1974
- Shortstop
- Born: December 17, 1938 (age 87); Matanzas, Cuba
- Batted: Right Threw: Right

MLB debut
- July 25, 1960, for the Cincinnati Reds

Last MLB appearance
- September 26, 1975, for the Texas Rangers

MLB statistics
- Batting average: .257
- Home runs: 118
- Runs batted in: 689
- Stats at Baseball Reference

Teams
- Cincinnati Reds (1960–1968); Minnesota Twins (1969–1971); California Angels (1972); Cleveland Indians (1973); Texas Rangers (1974–1975)

Career highlights and awards
- 5× All-Star (1964–1966, 1968, 1971); Gold Glove Award (1965); Cincinnati Reds Hall of Fame

Leonardo Lazaro Cárdenas Alfonso (/ˈkɑːrdɛnəs/ KAR-deh-nəs; born December 17, 1938) is a Cuban former professional baseball player. He played in Major League Baseball as a shortstop from 1960 to 1975, most prominently as a member of the Cincinnati Reds, where he was the starting shortstop for seven seasons.

A five-time All-Star, Cárdenas was one of the top defensive shortstops of his era. Nicknamed "Mr. Automatic" because his defensive play was so reliable; he won a Gold Glove Award for his defensive prowess in 1965. His 20 home runs in 1966 set a Reds team record for home runs by a shortstop that stood for 30 years. He also played for the Minnesota Twins, California Angels, Cleveland Indians, and Texas Rangers. Cárdenas was inducted into the Cincinnati Reds Hall of Fame in 1981.

== Early years ==
Cárdenas was born in Matanzas, Cuba, one of 15 children of Rafael and Roberta Cardenas. He came to the U.S. in 1956 at age 16 (although he claimed to be 17, the minimum age to be signed by a major league team) and received a $500 signing bonus. He was among the last of the Cuban players to make it out of Cuba before the borders were sealed. He batted .316 for the Arizona–Mexico League's Tucson Cowboys in 1956, and signed with the Cincinnati Reds the following season. While playing for the Havana Sugar Kings in the International League in 1959, Cárdenas was inadvertently shot by raucous Fidel Castro supporters firing off rifles in the grandstand in celebration of the 26th of July Movement. The Havana team was moved to Jersey City, New Jersey the following July and renamed the Jerseys.

== Major league career ==
=== Cincinnati Reds ===
Cárdenas was called up to the Reds in 1960 to fill in for an injured Roy McMillan. Cárdenas made his Major League debut on July 25, 1960, starting and batting eighth and playing shortstop in a 6–5 Reds win over the Chicago Cubs at Wrigley Field. After grounding into a double play and later lining out, he notched his first career hit with a seventh-inning run-scoring single off Cubs pitcher Bob Anderson. For the season, he batted .232 with one home run and 12 runs batted in (RBI). After the season, McMillan was dealt to the Milwaukee Braves for pitchers Joey Jay and Juan Pizarro.

Reds Manager Fred Hutchinson's original plan heading into the 1961 season was to platoon Cárdenas and utility infielder Eddie Kasko at short, with Cárdenas being the better fielder and Kasko being the better hitter. Cárdenas, however, surprised his boss with a .308 batting average. He also clubbed five home runs to Kasko's two in 271 fewer at bats.

Cárdenas was awarded the full-time starting shortstop job in 1962, and responded with a .294 average, 10 home runs and 60 RBI. He remained the Reds' starting shortstop for seven seasons, earning All-Star nods in 1964, 1965, and 1968, and being elected to start in 1966. Cárdenas had eight RBI and belted four home runs in a doubleheader against the Chicago Cubs, on June 5, 1966, on his way to setting a club record for home runs by a shortstop with 20 (later broken by Barry Larkin). Following the 1968 season, Cárdenas was traded to the Minnesota Twins for pitcher Jim Merritt.

=== Minnesota Twins ===
The Twins had something of a revolving door at short in 1968 with Jackie Hernández, Rick Renick, Ron Clark and César Tovar all manning the position at one point or another. Bringing in Cárdenas for 1969 solidified the Twins at their weakest position, and helped turn around the team's fortune. They went from 79–83 and seventh place in the American League (AL) to 97–65 and winning the American League West the first year of divisional play. For his part, Cárdenas batted .280 with 10 home runs and 70 RBI at the bottom of the Twins' batting order. He tied an AL record for assists by a shortstop, with 570.

Cárdenas was batting .285 with 11 home runs and 46 RBI at the 1971 All-Star break, leading to him being named to his only AL All-Star team; however, Cárdenas did not appear in the game. He ended the season with 18 home runs and 75 RBI and a stellar .985 fielding percentage to receive the Calvin R. Griffith Award given each season to the Twins' Most Valuable Player. Cárdenas‘ 1971 fielding percentage was the highest recorded in the American League since records began in 1901.

=== California Angels ===
At the 1971 Winter meetings, the California Angels acquired Cárdenas for relief pitcher Dave LaRoche. The acquisition marked former All-Star shortstop Jim Fregosi as trade bait; he would go to the New York Mets for Nolan Ryan a week later.

At 33 years old, Cárdenas was clearly on the decline by the time he joined the Angels. He batted only .143 in the month of June, and ended the season with a .223 average, six home runs and 42 RBI. During Spring training 1973, Cárdenas was traded to the Cleveland Indians for Tommy McCraw and minor leaguer Bob Marcano to make room for Bobby Valentine at short, whom they had recently acquired from the Los Angeles Dodgers.

=== Cleveland Indians ===
With the Indians in 1973, Cárdenas found himself in more of a back-up role, for the first time in his career. He made his first big league appearance at third, on August 16, and committed an error.

=== Texas Rangers ===
Following Cárdenas‘ only season in Cleveland, he was dealt to the Texas Rangers in a controversial deal for catcher Ken Suarez, who had just filed for arbitration a week before the February 12, 1974 trade. He filed a formal grievance against the Rangers claiming that he was traded in retaliation. Suarez never appeared in a game with the Indians, retiring instead.

Cárdenas, meanwhile, appeared in 34 games for the Rangers, 21 of which were at third base. He spent one more season with the Rangers as a third baseman, before retiring.

== Career stats ==
Seasons	Games	PA	AB	Runs	Hits	TB	2B	3B	HR	RBI	BB	SO	SB	Avg.	OBP	Slg.	Fld%
16	1941	7402	6707	662	1725	2462	285	49	118	689	522	1135	39	.257	.311	.367	.970

Cárdenas led NL shortstops in fielding percentage in 1963 (.972) and 1966 (.980), and the AL in 1971 (.985). He won his only Gold Glove award in 1965. The five-time All Star also appeared in back-to-back AL Championship Series with the Minnesota Twins, in 1969 and 1970, and the 1961 World Series against the New York Yankees. During his career, he hit six home runs off of Hall of Fame pitcher Juan Marichal. Cárdenas led the NL in intentional walks in 1965 and 1966 (25 and 18, respectively). He was voted into the Cincinnati Reds Hall of Fame, in 1981.

== Personal life ==
Despite coming to the United States in 1956 and twice being married to American women, Cárdenas never sought American citizenship. He has eight children. In 1998, Cárdenas was sentenced to three months in jail for assault, after breaking out the windows of a car that his wife and a male co-worker were sitting in, and breaking the man's arm with a bat.

Cárdenas lives in Cincinnati and makes regular appearances at the Reds Hall of Fame, Great American Ball Park and every December at Reds Fest.
