= Joey Jay =

American baseball player (1935–2024)

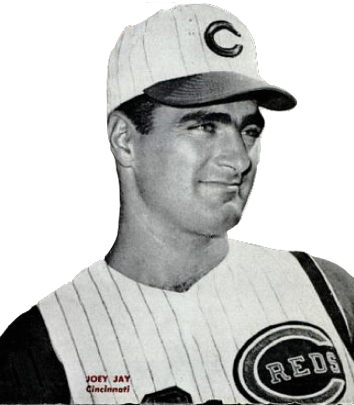
- Jay in 1962
- Pitcher
- Born: August 15, 1935; Middletown, Connecticut, U.S.
- Died: September 27, 2024 (aged 89); Lutz, Florida, U.S.
- Batted: Switch Threw: Right

MLB debut
- July 21, 1953, for the Milwaukee Braves

Last MLB appearance
- October 2, 1966, for the Atlanta Braves

MLB statistics
- Win–loss record: 99–91
- Earned run average: 3.77
- Strikeouts: 999
- Stats at Baseball Reference

Teams
- Milwaukee Braves (1953–1955, 1957–1960); Cincinnati Reds (1961–1966); Atlanta Braves (1966)

Career highlights and awards
- 2× All-Star (1961, 1961²); NL wins leader (1961); Cincinnati Reds Hall of Fame

Joseph Richard Jay (August 15, 1935 – September 27, 2024) was an American professional baseball starting pitcher, who played in Major League Baseball (MLB) from 1953 through 1966, Jay played for the Milwaukee / Atlanta Braves (1953–1955, 1957–1960, 1966), and Cincinnati Reds (1961–1966). He was a switch-hitter and threw right-handed.

In a 13-season big league career, Jay posted a 99–91 win–loss record, with 999 strikeouts, and a 3.77 earned run average (ERA), in 1546 1/3 innings pitched. In July 2008, he was inducted into the Cincinnati Reds Hall of Fame.

== Bonus baby ==
In addition to being the first Little League player to advance to the major leagues, Jay was one of the first "bonus baby" players in the major leagues. This resulted when he signed a significant contract ($20,000) with the Braves, which forced the Braves to keep Jay on their major league roster for two seasons because of the contract's amount. On September 20, 1953, at the age of 17, making his first career start (having pitched only one game in relief previous), he pitched a seven-inning complete game shutout (the game was shortened due to rain), but generally was unremarkable in his two years with the team. Following the end of his two years, he was sent to the minors to gain experience on a staff that already was loaded with Hall of Famer Warren Spahn, Bob Buhl and Lew Burdette. Jay went 7–5 with an ERA of 2.14 in 18 games for the Braves in his best season (1958), becoming the first pitcher (fourth player overall) to win the NL Player of the Month award in July (going 5–2 in seven starts, posting an ERA of 1.39, and earning 46 strikeouts in 58 1/3 innings) but a broken finger kept him out of the World Series.

== Second chance with Cincinnati ==
The Braves traded Jay to the Cincinnati Reds after the 1960 season for infielder Roy McMillan. Braves General Manager at the time, John McHale, reportedly made the deal based on the feeling Carl Willey could do a better job for Milwaukee than Jay.

Jay took full advantage of the trade, as he became a key figure in the Reds' stunning revival in 1961. Jay won 21 games (the first pitcher to win 20 since Ewell Blackwell in 1947), tied for the league lead in wins and shutouts, and won his second NL Player of the Month award in May (winning all six starts, including a May 4 one-hitter against the Phillies, a 2.72 ERA, and 38 strikeouts in 51 2/3 innings) as the Reds surged to their first National League pennant since 1940. However, the Reds faced a powerful New York Yankees club which won 109 games and featured Roger Maris, Mickey Mantle and Whitey Ford, as the Reds lost in five games. The lone Reds win occurred in Game 2, a 6–2 victory as Jay threw a complete-game four-hitter at Yankee Stadium, being Jay's single-game career highlight.

On May 1, 1962, at the Polo Grounds, off New York Mets pitcher Sherman Jones, Jay hit a three-run home run (base runners were Wally Post and Leo Cárdenas), in the sixth inning, for his first MLB home run. At Crosley Field, on May 28, 1962, Jay hit his only other career home run, off Houston Colt .45s pitcher Bobby Tiefenauer, in the fifth inning, a two-run blast (Don Zimmer was on base).

Jay also won 21 games in 1962 as the Reds won 98 games to finish in third place behind the Giants and Dodgers. Jay's heavy workload in 1961 and 1962 took a toll the following year, as he struggled to a 7–18 record. Jay posted a mark of 11–11 mark in 1964, as the Reds finished a single game behind the eventual World Series champion St. Louis Cardinals.

Jay would finish his career by returning to the Braves for their initial season in Atlanta in 1966.

== Post-baseball career ==
Jay resided in Florida after retiring from baseball and pursued a business career. An exploration and drilling company in which he was a partner expanded to own several oil fields in West Virginia. In addition, Jay owned or had ownership stakes in taxicab companies, limousine fleets, a carpet-cleaning company and building maintenance firms.

== Personal life and death ==
In October 1954, Jay married Lois Elizabeth Bruggen in Middletown, Connecticut. They were the parents of five children.

Jay died in Lutz, Florida on September 27, 2024, at the age of 89.

== See also ==
- List of Major League Baseball annual wins leaders

Awards and achievements
Preceded by Frank Thomas	Major League Player of the Month; July 1958	Succeeded by Lew Burdette
Preceded by Ken Boyer	Major League Player of the Month; May 1961	Succeeded by George Altman
