= Dan Driessen =

American baseball player (born 1951)

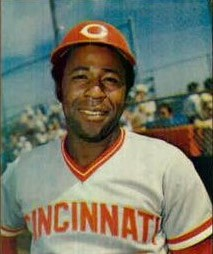
- First baseman
- Born: July 29, 1951 (age 74); Hilton Head Island, South Carolina, U.S.
- Batted: Left Threw: Right

MLB debut
- June 9, 1973, for the Cincinnati Reds

Last MLB appearance
- October 3, 1987, for the St. Louis Cardinals

MLB statistics
- Batting average: .267
- Home runs: 153
- Runs batted in: 763
- Stats at Baseball Reference

Teams
- Cincinnati Reds (1973–1984); Montreal Expos (1984–1985); San Francisco Giants (1985–1986); Houston Astros (1986); St. Louis Cardinals (1987)

Career highlights and awards
- 2× World Series champion (1975, 1976); Cincinnati Reds Hall of Fame

Daniel Driessen (born July 29, 1951) is an American former professional baseball player. He played in Major League Baseball as a first baseman from 1973 to 1987, most notably as a member of the Cincinnati Reds dynasty that won three National League pennants and two World Series championships between 1973 and 1976. He was inducted into the Cincinnati Reds Baseball Hall of Fame on June 23, 2012.

== Early life ==
Driessen was born in Hilton Head Island, South Carolina as one of eight children, all raised by their mother who worked as a maid. His father died when he was six years old. He attended Michael C. Riley High School (which did not have a baseball team) until his senior year. He then went to Hardeeville High School in Hardeeville, South Carolina, which also did not have a team, but he made a name for himself as a catcher with the town team, the Hardeeville Boll Weevils. His coach, Hal Young, wrote to Major League teams touting Driessen, and the Atlanta Braves and Reds showed interest. The Braves passed on him, but the Reds offered him a contract.

== Major League career ==
Driessen was signed by the Reds as an amateur free agent in 1969. He made his major-league debut at age 21 on June 9, 1973, in an 8-4 Reds win over the Chicago Cubs at Wrigley Field. Starting at third base and batting sixth, he had one hit and one walk in five at-bats. His first career hit was a ninth-inning double off Jack Aker.

He had a productive rookie season, hitting .301 with four home runs and 47 runs batted in. Driessen received the nickname "The Cobra" during his rookie season because of the quick, lethal way his bat struck. He became Cincinnati's starting third baseman in 1974, but was soon replaced at that position by Pete Rose.

Driessen was part of the Reds' 1975 World Series-winning team, going hitless in two at-bats in the Reds' seven-game win over the Boston Red Sox. In 1976, Driessen became the National League's first-ever designated hitter in a World Series. Although he went 0–4 in the series opener against the New York Yankees, overall he made the most of his opportunity by hitting .357 with five hits (including two doubles and a home run) and two walks in 16 plate appearances as the Reds swept the series for their second consecutive World Series crown.

He was the Reds' starting first baseman from 1977 to 1984 after the trade of Tony Pérez. His most productive year was in 1977 as he hit .300 with 17 home runs and a career-high 91 runs batted in along with a career-high 31 stolen bases. Driessen led all National League first basemen in fielding three times. He also led the NL in walks with 93 in 1980.

He was traded in the middle of the 1984 season to the Montreal Expos. He saw significant playing time that season as well as in 1985 for the Expos and then, following another mid-season trade, to the San Francisco Giants. In 1986, his playing time fell significantly as, for the third consecutive season, he played for two teams, the Giants, who released him on May 1, and the Houston Astros, who signed him on June 2. He was released after the season and signed with the St. Louis Cardinals on June 9, 1987.

Filling in at first base for the 1987 National League champion Cardinals, in his third World Series he hit .231 in 14 plate appearances as the Cardinals fell in seven games to the Minnesota Twins. It was Driessen's final major-league season.

== Career statistics ==
In 1732 games over 15 seasons, Driessen compiled a .267 batting average (1464-for-5479) with 746 runs, 282 doubles, 23 triples, 153 home runs, 763 RBI, 154 stolen bases, 761 bases on balls, .356 on-base percentage and .411 slugging percentage. He posted a .992 fielding percentage playing at first base, third base, and left and right field. In the post-season, in four National League Championship Series and three World Series covering 23 games, he batted .212 (14-for-66) with 9 runs, 1 home run and 4 RBI.

== Personal life ==
Driessen married his wife, Bonnie, in 1976 and they raised three daughters. In the early 1990s the family moved from Cincinnati to Hilton Head, where Driessen owns and operates Driessen Excavating Services and helps coach the Hilton Head High School baseball team.

He was inducted into the Cincinnati Reds Baseball Hall of Fame on June 23, 2012. He is the uncle of former major-leaguer Gerald Perry.
