= Pete Donohue =

American baseball player (1900–1988)

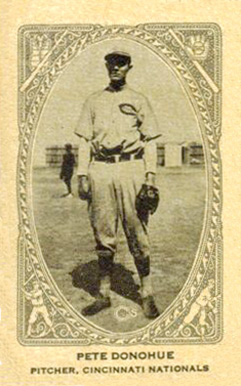
- Pitcher
- Born: November 5, 1900; Athens, Texas, U.S.
- Died: February 23, 1988 (aged 87); Fort Worth, Texas, U.S.
- Batted: Right Threw: Right

MLB debut
- July 1, 1921, for the Cincinnati Reds

Last MLB appearance
- May 6, 1932, for the Boston Red Sox

MLB statistics
- Win–loss record: 134–118
- Earned run average: 3.87
- Strikeouts: 574
- Stats at Baseball Reference

Teams
- Cincinnati Reds (1921–1930); New York Giants (1930–1931); Cleveland Indians (1931); Boston Red Sox (1932)

Career highlights and awards
- NL wins leader (1926); Cincinnati Reds Hall of Fame

Peter Joseph Donohue (November 5, 1900 – February 23, 1988) was an American right-handed starting pitcher with a 12-year career from 1921 to 1932. He played for the Cincinnati Reds, New York Giants, both of the National League, and the Cleveland Indians and Boston Red Sox of the American League. His interment was located at Fort Worth's Greenwood Memorial Park along with Tom Baker and Jackie Tavener.

During a start on June 12, 1928, Donohue pitched 6 1/3 innings and allowed 11 earned runs on 14 hits. However, thanks in part to his own home run, he was credited with the win. As of 2022, his game score of 1 is the lowest for a winning pitcher since the earned run became an official statistic in 1913.

Donohue was a very good hitting pitcher in his major league career, posting a .246 batting average (180-for-732) with 44 runs, 6 home runs, 87 RBI and drawing 21 bases on balls.

== Highlights ==
- Led National League in wins (1926, with 20 wins)

== See also ==
- List of Major League Baseball annual wins leaders
