= Johnny Temple =

American baseball player (1927–1994)

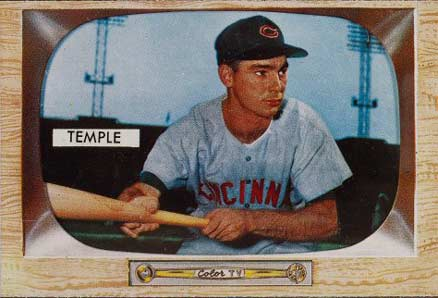
- Second baseman
- Born: August 8, 1927; Lexington, North Carolina, U.S.
- Died: January 9, 1994 (aged 66); Anderson, South Carolina, U.S.
- Batted: Right Threw: Right

MLB debut
- April 15, 1952, for the Cincinnati Reds

Last MLB appearance
- July 8, 1964, for the Cincinnati Reds

MLB statistics
- Batting average: .284
- Home runs: 22
- Runs batted in: 395
- Stats at Baseball Reference

Teams
- Cincinnati Reds (1952–1959); Cleveland Indians (1960–1961); Baltimore Orioles (1962); Houston Colt .45s (1962–1963); Cincinnati Reds (1964)

Career highlights and awards
- 6× All-Star (1956, 1957, 1959, 1959², 1961, 1961²); Cincinnati Reds Hall of Fame

John Ellis Temple (August 8, 1927 – January 9, 1994) was an American professional baseball player and coach. He played in Major League Baseball as a second baseman from 1952 to 1964, most prominently as a member of the Cincinnati Reds, where he was the leadoff hitter and starting second baseman for six seasons.

A six-time All-Star player, Temple had a .300-plus batting average three times with the Reds and was one of the top defensive second basemen of his era. He teamed with shortstop Roy McMillan to form one of the best double-play combinations of the 1950s.

He also played for the Cleveland Indians, Baltimore Orioles and the Houston Colt .45s. Temple was inducted into the Cincinnati Reds Hall of Fame in 1965.

== Early baseball career ==
Temple was born in Lexington, North Carolina where he attended Reed High School, now known as West Davidson High School. When he was 16-years-old, he suffered a broken leg and severe burns on his left leg while escaping a house fire, causing him to wear a protective shin guard over the injuries while participating in sports. At Reed High School, he served as captain of the school's baseball and basketball teams and graduated as the class valedictorian in 1945.

Temple excelled as a high school basketball player and he received an athletic scholarship to play basketball for Duke University however, as a poor farm boy, he felt out of place at the prestigious university and left the school after two weeks. Instead, he decided to enroll at Catawba College in Salisbury, North Carolina. He then joined the United States Navy and served on the aircraft carrier USS Randolph toward the end of the Second World War. While playing for Navy baseball teams, Temple discovered that he enjoyed playing baseball enough to try to make a professional career out of it.

In 1948, Temple signed a contract to play for the Cincinnati Reds after attending a Reds tryout camp in Mooresville, North Carolina. He was assigned to play for the Morganton Aggies of the Western Carolina League where he produced a .316 batting average in 59 games. In 1949, he hit .400 while playing in 116 games for the Ogden Reds of the Pioneer League.

By the 1951 season, he had progressed to the top of the minor league ladder with the Tulsa Oilers where the presence of the superb-fielding shortstop Roy McMillan forced Temple to convert to playing as a second baseman.

== Major leagues ==
Temple made his major league debut with the Reds on April 15, 1952 at the age of 24. He was a career .284 hitter with 22 home runs and 395 RBI in 1420 games. A legitimate leadoff hitter and four-time All-Star, he was a very popular player in Cincinnati in the 1950s. He teamed with McMillan from 1954 through the 1959 season to become the second longest double play combination in the NL since 1900.(The longest was Joe Morgan and Dave Concepción of the Cincinnati Reds in the 1970s.). Throughout his career, he walked more often than he struck out, compiling an outstanding 1.92 walk-to-strikeout ratio (648-to-338) and a .363 on-base percentage. Temple also had above-average speed and good instincts on the base paths. Quietly, he had 140 steals in 198 attempts (71%).

In 1957, Temple and six of his Redleg teammates—Ed Bailey, Roy McMillan, Don Hoak, Gus Bell, Wally Post and Frank Robinson—were voted into the National League All-Star starting lineup, the result of a ballot stuffing campaign by Redlegs fans. Bell remained on the team as a reserve, but Post was taken off altogether. Bell and Post were replaced as starters by Hank Aaron and Willie Mays.

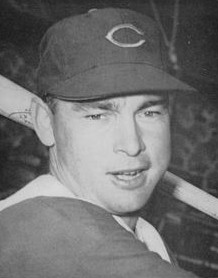
Temple in 1957

Temple enjoyed his best year in 1959, with career-highs in batting average (.311), home runs (8), RBI (67), runs (102), hits (186), at-bats (598), doubles (35) and triples (6). At the end of the season he was sent to Cleveland for Billy Martin, Gordy Coleman and Cal McLish.

Temple also played with Baltimore and Houston, and again with Cincinnati for his last major season, where he was a part-time coach. In August 1964, he cleaned out his locker after having a fight with fellow coach, Reggie Otero. When Fred Hutchinson had to leave the Reds due to his health, Cincinnati management decided to go with only two coaches and not reinstate Temple.

After his baseball career was over, Temple worked as a television newsman in Houston, Texas and got involved with a business that sold boats and RVs. The business failed causing Temple to lose everything, including his home. In 1977, Temple was arrested and charged with larceny of farm equipment. Through the efforts of his wife, who wrote a public letter to The Sporting News, Temple got legal assistance. He gave testimony to the South Carolina assembly against his criminal partners.

Temple died in Anderson, South Carolina in 1994 at the age of 66.
