= Larry Kopf =

American baseball player (1890–1986)

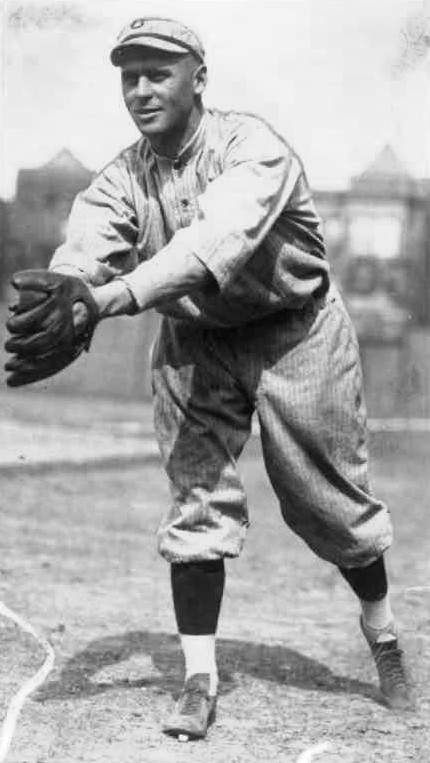
- Shortstop
- Born: November 3, 1890; Bristol, Connecticut, U.S.
- Died: October 15, 1986 (aged 95); Hamilton County, Ohio, U.S.
- Batted: Switch Threw: Right

MLB debut
- September 2, 1913, for the Cleveland Naps

Last MLB appearance
- June 16, 1923, for the Boston Braves

MLB statistics
- Batting average: .249
- Home runs: 5
- Runs batted in: 266
- Stats at Baseball Reference

Teams
- Cleveland Naps (1913); Philadelphia Athletics (1914–1915); Cincinnati Reds (1916–1917, 1919–1921); Boston Braves (1922–1923)

Career highlights and awards
- World Series champion (1919); Cincinnati Reds Hall of Fame

William Lorenz "Larry" Kopf (November 3, 1890 – October 15, 1986) was an American professional baseball player who played infield in the Major Leagues from 1913 to 1923. He would play for the Cleveland Indians, Philadelphia Athletics, Boston Braves and Cincinnati Reds. Best known for his part in the only double no hitter in major league history. Kopf led off the tenth inning with a line drive single, breaking up a full nine innings without a hit for either team. He later scored on a single by Jim Thorpe.

He was the brother of football coach Herb Kopf.
