= Jakie May =

American baseball player (1895–1970)

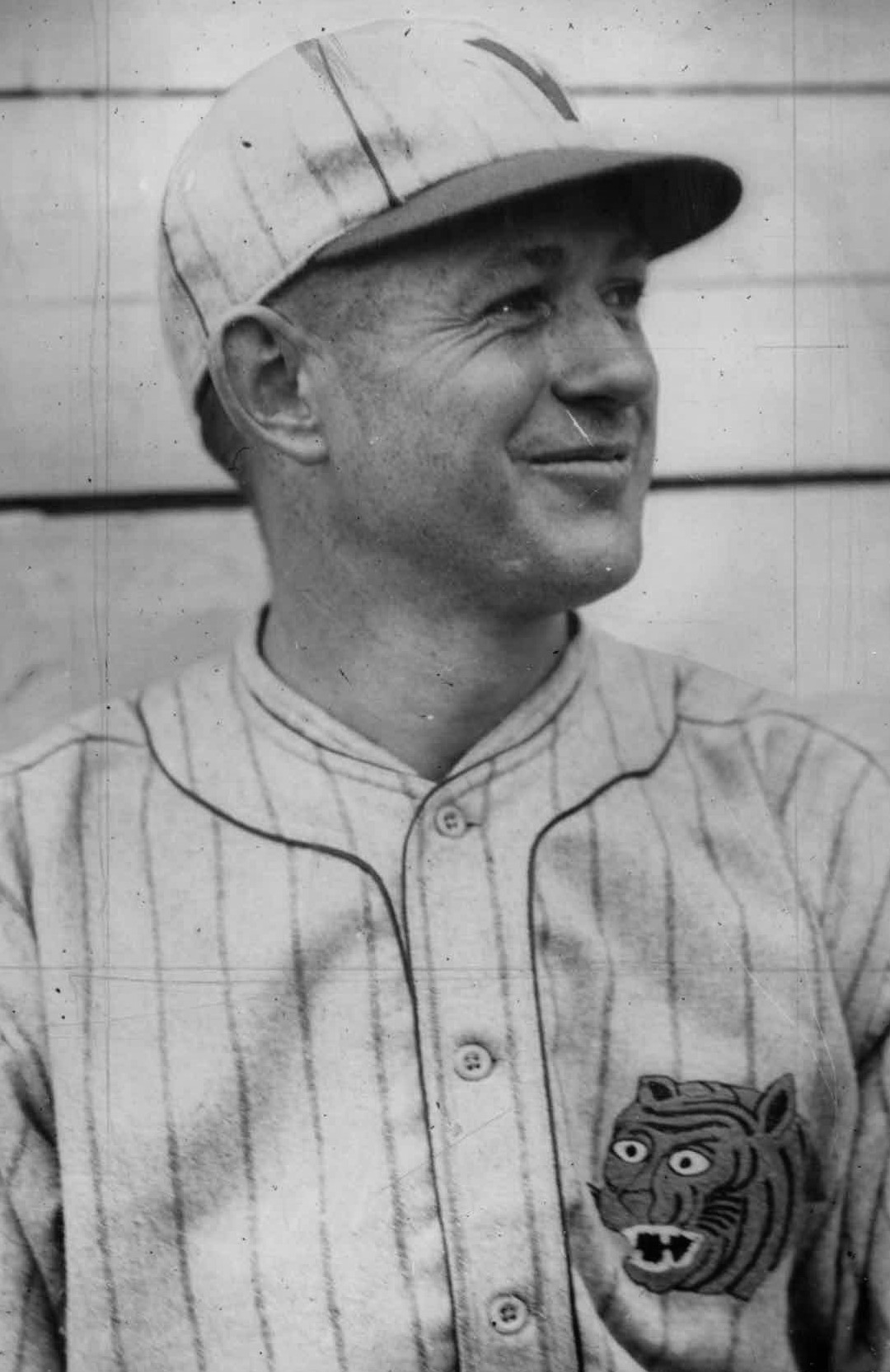
- Pitcher
- Born: November 25, 1895; Youngsville, North Carolina, U.S.
- Died: June 3, 1970 (aged 74); Wendell, North Carolina, U.S.
- Batted: Right Threw: Left

MLB debut
- June 26, 1917, for the St. Louis Cardinals

Last MLB appearance
- September 25, 1932, for the Chicago Cubs

MLB statistics
- Win–loss record: 72–95
- Earned run average: 3.88
- Strikeouts: 765
- Stats at Baseball Reference

Teams
- St. Louis Cardinals (1917–1921); Cincinnati Reds (1924–1930); Chicago Cubs (1931–1932)

Frank Spruiell "Jakie" May (November 25, 1895 – June 3, 1970) was an American professional baseball player. He was a left-handed pitcher over parts of 14 seasons (1917–1921, 1924–1932) with the St. Louis Cardinals, Cincinnati Reds and Chicago Cubs. For his career, he compiled a 72–95 record in 410 appearances, most as a relief pitcher, with a 3.88 earned run average and 765 strikeouts.

May won 35 games for the Vernon Tigers in 1922, breaking Cack Henley's record for wins in a Pacific Coast League season. May was a member of the National League pennant-winning 1932 Cubs, suffering the loss in the fourth and final game of the 1932 World Series against the New York Yankees. In World Series play, he had a 0–1 record in two appearances, with an 11.57 earned run average and 4 strikeouts.

May was born in Youngsville, North Carolina and later died in Wendell, North Carolina at the age of 74.

== See also ==
- List of Major League Baseball annual saves leaders
- List of Major League Baseball career hit batsmen leaders
