= Heinie Groh =

American baseball player and manager (1889–1968)

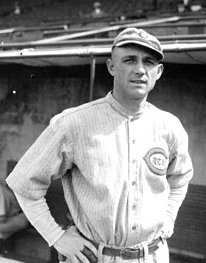
- Heinie Groh c. 1919
- Third baseman / Manager
- Born: September 18, 1889; Rochester, New York, U.S.
- Died: August 22, 1968 (aged 78); Cincinnati, Ohio, U.S.
- Batted: Right Threw: Right

MLB debut
- April 12, 1912, for the New York Giants

Last MLB appearance
- October 2, 1927, for the Pittsburgh Pirates

MLB statistics
- Batting average: .292
- Home runs: 26
- Runs batted in: 566
- Stats at Baseball Reference
- Managerial record at Baseball Reference

Teams
- As player: New York Giants (1912–1913); Cincinnati Reds (1913–1921); New York Giants (1922–1926); Pittsburgh Pirates (1927); As manager: Cincinnati Reds (1918)

Career highlights and awards
- 2× World Series champion (1919, 1922); Cincinnati Reds Hall of Fame

Henry Knight "Heinie" Groh (September 18, 1889 – August 22, 1968) was an American professional baseball player and manager. He played in Major League Baseball as a third baseman from 1912 to 1927, spending nearly his entire career with the Cincinnati Reds and New York Giants before playing his final season for the Pittsburgh Pirates. He excelled as a fielder, becoming the National League's top third baseman in the late 1910s and early 1920s, and captained championship teams with the 1919 Reds and 1922 Giants. Renowned for his "bottle bat", he was an effective leadoff hitter, batting .300 four times and leading the league in doubles twice and in hits, runs and walks once each.

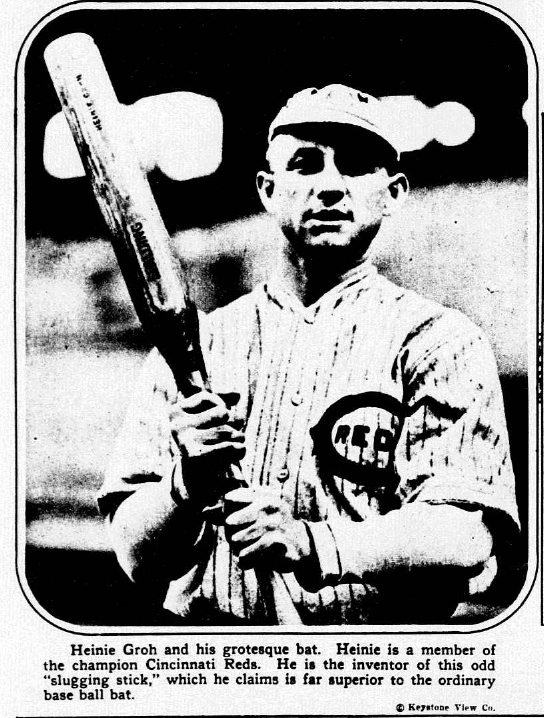
Heinie Groh and his signature "bottle bat"

Defensively, Groh led the National League in double plays six times and in fielding percentage five times, both records. He led the league in putouts three times; his .983 fielding average in 1924 was then a major league record. He set major league records for career fielding average (.967) and double plays (278), and upon retiring ranked third in NL history in games (1,299) and assists (2,554) and fourth in putouts (1,456) and total chances (4,146) at third base.

== Professional playing career ==
Born in Rochester, New York, to German immigrant parents Louis and Ernestine Schneider Groh, Heinie Groh was a premier third baseman in the dead-ball era, during a period when both the playing fields and the players were rough. He made his debut as a second baseman with the Giants in 1912, playing for John McGraw and with star pitcher Christy Mathewson. At 5 feet 8 inches and 158 pounds, he appeared younger than his 23 years; in his first major league at bat, umpire Bill Klem questioned whether McGraw had mistakenly sent a batboy to the plate, but Groh came through with a base hit.

It was McGraw who suggested that Groh use a heavier bottle-style bat, though Groh shaved the handle down even further for better weight distribution and became a skilled bunter. But after just 31 games with the Giants, he was traded to the Reds in May 1913, and finished his rookie year with a .282 average. He improved to .288 in 1914 and led the league in times hit by pitch, but also led the league in errors at second base, and manager Buck Herzog—who had played both second and third base himself—shifted Groh to third base permanently in 1915.

The move was spectacularly successful, as Groh not only hit .290 with 32 doubles and 170 hits, but set a new league record with 34 double plays, breaking Lave Cross' 1899 mark of 32; he also finished within a fraction of a point of Bobby Byrne for the lead in fielding average at .969. On July 5, he hit for the cycle against the Chicago Cubs, becoming the only player to do so between 1913 and 1917; no Red would do so again until 1940. In 1916 he led the league in both walks (84) and double plays (32), and was among the top five NL players in runs and triples. In 1917 he batted .304, with a 23-game hitting streak, and led the NL in putouts (178) and fielding average (.966); his 39 doubles led the NL, and fell just short of Cy Seymour's 1905 club record of 40. He also led the league in hits (182) and on-base percentage (.385), and was second in runs (91), walks (71) and total bases (246) and sixth in slugging average (.411).

1918 was an even better season in various ways, as despite a season curtailed by World War I and the influenza epidemic, he tied Billy Nash's 1890 major league record of 37 double plays, also leading the league in putouts (180) and fielding average (.969); Pie Traynor would set a new record with 41 double plays for the 1925 Pittsburgh Pirates. Groh hit .320 (third in the league), led the NL in runs (86), doubles (28) and on-base percentage (.395), and was second in hits (158) and third in walks (54) and total bases (195). He also managed the team for its final ten games (with a 7–3 record) after Mathewson entered the military.

The 1919 team marked the peak of his Cincinnati years, with the team winning its first pennant since its 1882 inaugural season in the American Association. Groh again led the NL with 171 putouts and 22 double plays, was fourth in the league with a .310 batting average, and was among the top five players in runs (79), runs batted in (63), on-base percentage (.392), slugging (.431) and walks (56), even though he missed much of September with an injury. The Reds went on to defeat the favored Chicago White Sox in the scandal-tainted World Series; after the Chicago players were discredited as having fixed the Series, Groh was famously quoted as saying "I think we'd have beaten them either way." In Game 1, Groh—batting third in the Series—drove in the first run of the Series on a sacrifice fly, and also had an RBI single in the 9–1 win. He scored in the 4–2 Game 2 victory, and also scored a disputed run in the 5–0 Game 5 win; White Sox catcher Ray Schalk was thrown out of the game for complaining about the call. In the final Game 8 (it being a best-of-nine Series), he had a single and scored in the 4-run first inning, and singled and scored again in the second as the Reds cruised to a 10–5 win and their first Series championship. During the 1919 season, his brother Lew Groh appeared in two games for the Philadelphia Athletics.

In 1920, Groh slipped slightly to a .298 average, posting solid totals in walks, runs and doubles, and led the NL in double plays for the fifth time with 30. He batted .331 in 1921, but was bothered by injuries throughout the year. He had begun the year with a long contract holdout, only joining the team in June for $10,000 (less than the $12,000 he had requested) on the condition that he would be immediately traded to the Giants. A deal was completed to send him back to New York, where McGraw had long been trying to re-acquire him; but Commissioner Kenesaw Mountain Landis cancelled the trade, requiring that Groh complete the year with the Reds. In December, after the Giants had won the World Series, he was finally sent to New York for two players and cash (varying reports give amounts from $100,000 to $250,000).

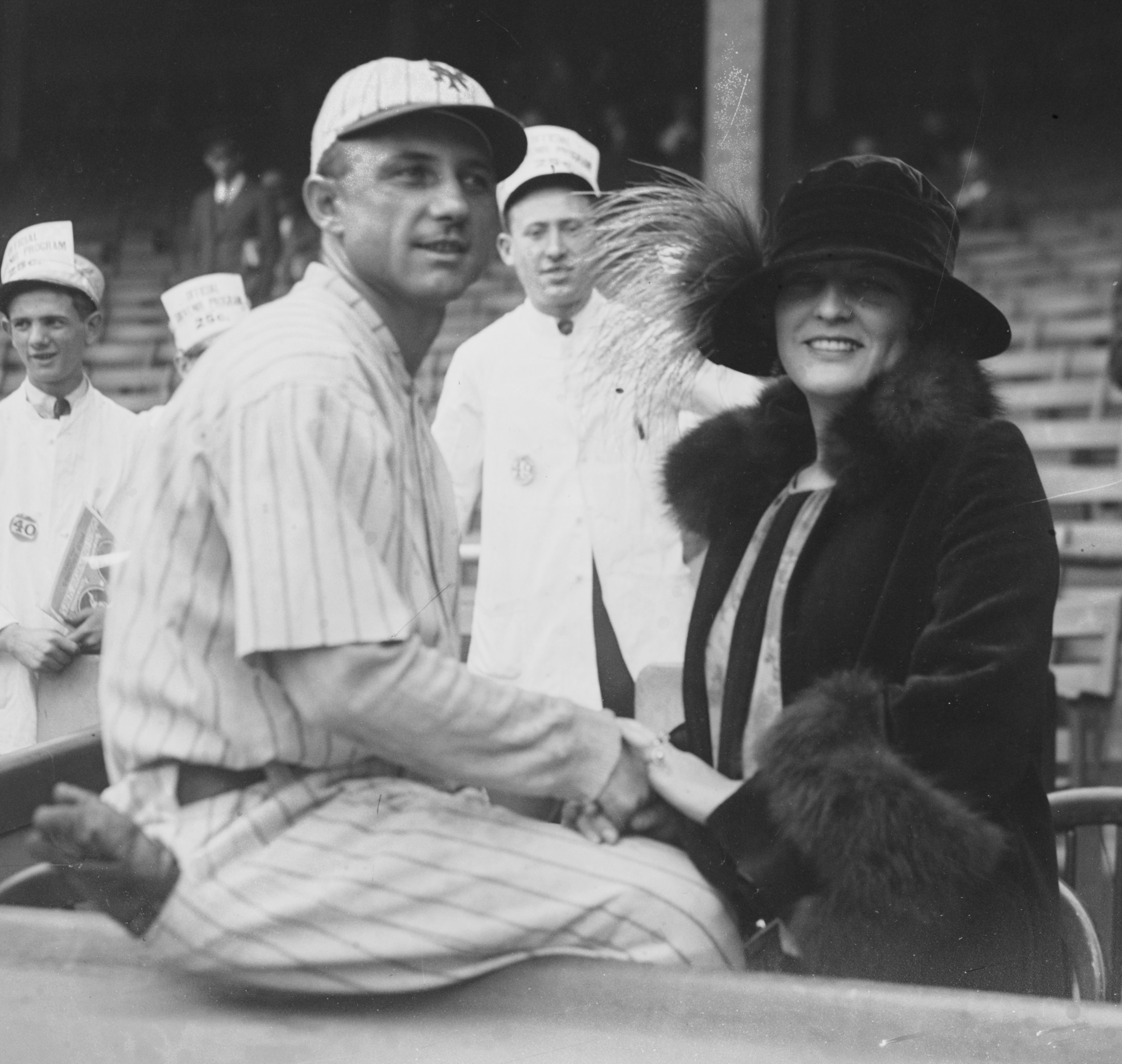
Groh with his wife c. 1922

Although his batting marks were never the same with the Giants as they had been with the Reds, he posted good batting averages with over 20 doubles in each of his three full seasons in New York. In 1922 he led the NL in double plays (25) for the sixth and last time, and also in fielding average (.965) for the third time; in that year he broke Nash's NL record of 220 career double plays. His season highlights came in the World Series against the New York Yankees, as he batted .474 in the five-game sweep (four wins and a tie). Batting second, he was 3-for-3 with a triple in Game 1, singling and scoring in a 3-run eighth-inning rally that propelled the team to a 3–2 win. He singled twice and scored in a 3–0 win in Game 3, and singled and scored again in a 4-run fifth inning in Game 4, with New York hanging on for a 4–3 triumph. In Game 5, he singled with one out in the eighth inning to start a 3-run rally that gave the Giants their final 5–3 lead, although he was thrown out at the plate in the inning. For the rest of his life, Groh maintained the Ohio license plate number 474. He also noted that he had figured out the Yankees' signs, saying, "I knew when they were going to bunt and when they were going to hit away. Which is a very nice thing for a third baseman to know."

Although his fielding range had declined, Groh continued to better his accuracy. In 1923 he set a league record with a .975 fielding average, topping Hans Lobert's 1913 mark of .974; he also hit .290 during the season. The Giants won the pennant again, becoming the first team to remain in first place all season, but lost the World Series in six games to the Yankees, with Groh batting only .182. In 1924 he bettered his own mark by setting a new major league record with a .983 fielding average, breaking Larry Gardner's record of .976 with the 1920 Cleveland Indians. Willie Kamm would set a new record of .984 with the 1933 White Sox, but Groh's mark remains the best by an NL third baseman. In 1924 Groh also broke Nash's major league record of 265 career double plays, and again led the league in times being hit by a pitch. The Giants went to the World Series for the fourth straight year, but lost again to the Washington Senators in seven games. Groh, who had suffered a knee injury late in the season, made just a single pinch-hitting appearance, singling in the 11th inning of the final game; the Giants lost 4–3 in the 12th when, with one out and runners on first and second, Earl McNeely hit a ground ball to rookie third baseman Freddie Lindstrom which apparently struck a pebble and bounced over his head for a double.

Groh appeared in a limited role for the Giants in each of the next two years, and ended his career with the Pirates in 1927. His final major league appearance was as a pinch-hitter in the ninth inning of Game 3 of the 1927 World Series against the Yankees, in which the Pirates were swept; he popped up to pitcher Herb Pennock. Groh retired with a .292 batting average, 1,774 hits, 918 runs, 566 RBI, 26 home runs, 308 doubles, 87 triples, 696 walks and 180 stolen bases in 1,676 games. His career fielding average was later topped by Kamm, and remained an NL record until Ken Reitz surpassed it in 1979; Traynor broke his record for career double plays in 1933. Groh's 1,299 games at third base trailed only Harry Steinfeldt (1386) and Milt Stock (1349) in NL history.

== Post-professional career ==
Groh became a minor league manager as well as a scout after retiring as a player. He later worked as a racetrack cashier, and was among the baseball figures interviewed for Lawrence Ritter's landmark 1966 book, The Glory of Their Times.

Groh was inducted into the Cincinnati Reds Hall of Fame in 1963, and died at age 78 in Cincinnati; he is interred in Spring Grove Cemetery there.

== See also ==
- List of Major League Baseball players to hit for the cycle
- List of Major League Baseball annual runs scored leaders
- List of Major League Baseball annual doubles leaders
- List of Major League Baseball career stolen bases leaders
- List of Major League Baseball player-managers

== Notes ==
Achievements
| Preceded by Ed Lennox | Hitting for the cycle July 5, 1915 | Succeeded by Cliff Heathcote |
