= Hughie Critz =

American baseball player (1900–1980)

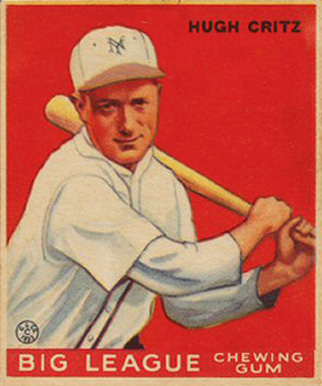
- Second baseman
- Born: September 17, 1900; Starkville, Mississippi, U.S.
- Died: January 10, 1980 (aged 79); Greenwood, Mississippi, U.S.
- Batted: Right Threw: Right

MLB debut
- May 31, 1924, for the Cincinnati Reds

Last MLB appearance
- September 18, 1935, for the New York Giants

MLB statistics
- Batting average: .268
- Home runs: 38
- Runs batted in: 531
- Stats at Baseball Reference

Teams
- Cincinnati Reds (1924–1930); New York Giants (1930–1935)

Career highlights and awards
- World Series champion (1933); Cincinnati Reds Hall of Fame

Hugh Melville Critz (September 17, 1900 – January 10, 1980) was an American second baseman in Major League Baseball for the Cincinnati Reds in the 1920s and the New York Giants in the 1930s.

== Career overview ==
Critz was born in Starkville, Mississippi, the oldest of three children. He attended college in his home town at Mississippi State University, where his father, Professor Colonel Hugh Critz Sr., was a respected instructor and was appointed president of the university, then known as Mississippi A&M, in 1930.

Critz began playing in the Cotton States League. He was 68 inches (170 cm) tall and weighed 150 pounds (68 kg); one New York writer described him as "one of the little fellers in baseball". In 1922, the Greenwood Indians team in the Cotton States League sold him for $2,000 to Memphis, entering the minor leagues.

In May 1924, the second baseman of the Cincinnati Reds, Sam Bohne, was injured; the team reached out to the Minneapolis Millers and obtained Critz, then 23 years old, on May 29. Minneapolis in returned received pitcher Bill Harris, along with 15,000 dollars, and two players to be named later.

In his first major league game, he had two hits off Hall-of-Fame pitcher Grover Cleveland Alexander, and went on to hit .322 in 102 games, with 19 stolen bases, as a rookie.

Through the 1920s, he was an extremely solid, speedy, good-hitting second baseman for many decent Reds teams although the team began to decline in the late 1920s, finishing seventh in the eight-team National League in 1929 and 1930. In the Reds' best year with Critz on the team, 1926, they finished second in the league two games behind the champion St. Louis Cardinals. Alongside the Reds' success that year, he also batted .270, with 3 homers and 79 RBIs. He tied his career high for triples with 14 and had his next-best career high in RBIs with 79. He finished second in MVP voting, behind only Bob O'Farrell.

Although his speed numbers only decreased from his rookie season, when he stole 19 bases, he still averaged 11 stolen bases per season for his career. In 1929, he was named captain of the Reds during spring training.

In 1930, his career took a sudden turn when he was traded to the Giants for pitcher Larry Benton. With them, he won a World Series in 1933, had more quality years, and retired on September 27, 1935.

In a 12-season career, he batted .268 with 38 home runs and 531 RBIs in 1478 games. He had 97 career stolen bases, 832 runs scored, 195 doubles and 95 triples, accumulating 1591 hits in 5930 at bats. Defensively, he recorded a .974 fielding percentage as a second baseman.

He made the Cincinnati Reds Hall of Fame in 1962, and died in Greenwood, Mississippi at age 79.

Critz was married to Mary Wiggs, with whom he had two children.
