= Roy McMillan =

American baseball player and manager (1929–1997)

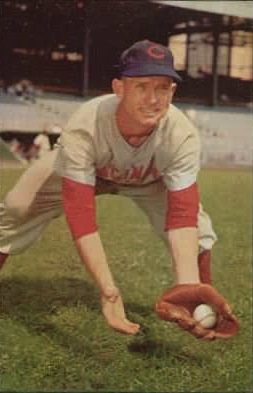
- McMillan, c. 1953
- Shortstop / Manager
- Born: July 17, 1929; Bonham, Texas, U.S.
- Died: November 2, 1997 (aged 68); Bonham, Texas, U.S.
- Batted: Right Threw: Right

MLB debut
- April 17, 1951, for the Cincinnati Reds

Last MLB appearance
- August 3, 1966, for the New York Mets

MLB statistics
- Batting average: .243
- Home runs: 68
- Runs batted in: 594
- Managerial record: 27–28
- Winning %: .491
- Stats at Baseball Reference

Teams
- As player: Cincinnati Reds (1951–1960); Milwaukee Braves (1961–1964); New York Mets (1964–1966); As manager: Milwaukee Brewers (1972); New York Mets (1975)

Career highlights and awards
- 2× All-Star (1956, 1957); 3× Gold Glove Award (1957–1959); Cincinnati Reds Hall of Fame

Roy David McMillan (July 17, 1929 – November 2, 1997) was an American professional baseball player, coach and manager. He played in Major League Baseball as a shortstop from 1951 to 1966, most prominently as a member of the Cincinnati Reds, where he was the starting shortstop for nine seasons.

A two-time All-Star player, McMillan was one of the top defensive shortstops of his era. Nicknamed "Mr. Shortstop" because of his defensive play, he won three Gold Glove Awards during his tenure with the Reds. He teamed with Reds second baseman, Johnny Temple, to form one of the best double-play combinations of the 1950s.

McMillan also played for the Milwaukee Braves and the New York Mets. Following his retirement as a player, McMillan managed the Brewers and Mets. McMillan was inducted into the Cincinnati Reds Hall of Fame in 1971.

== Early life ==
McMillan was born in Bonham, Texas, and attended Bonham High School where he was a member of the football, basketball, tennis, and the track and field teams. Although his high school did not have a baseball team, he did play as a third baseman on the town softball team. After high school, Roy attended Texas A&M University for one semester hoping to play sports of some kind but, returned to Bonham after failing to make the football team.

In 1947, McMillan attended a Cincinnati Reds try-out camp in McKinney, Texas conducted by Red scout Hack Miller. Although his baseball experience was extremely limited, Miller saw his athletic ability, especially his ability to catch ground balls. In 1947 he was assigned to the Ballinger Cats of the Longhorn League. By the 1950 season, he had progressed to the top of the minor league ladder with the Tulsa Oilers where he produced a .274 batting average.

== Major League Baseball career ==
McMillan made his major league debut with the Reds on April 16, 1951 at the age of 21 however, he saw little playing time as he served as a back up to the starting shortstop, Virgil Stallcup. Unhappy with Stallcup's performance, Reds manager Luke Sewell decided to promote McMillan to be the starting shortstop for the 1952 season.

McMillan became a defensive standout and would lead the National League (NL) in fielding percentage four times, putouts three times, assists four times, and double plays four consecutive years from 1953 to 1956. When second baseman, Johnny Temple joined the Reds in 1954, he teamed with McMillan through the 1959 season to become the second longest double play combination in the NL since 1900.(The longest was Joe Morgan and Dave Concepción of the Cincinnati Reds in the 1970s.) He played in 150 or more games in eight different seasons–six in a row. In 1954, he set a since-surpassed major league record of 129 double plays.

The Reds’ best result during McMillan’s career came in 1956 when the Reds were in first place at mid-season and stayed in the pennant race until the last day of the season, ending up with a 91–63 record, two games behind the Brooklyn Dodgers. Despite the performance of home run hitting Frank Robinson, the Cincinnati Baseball Writers Association named McMillan the Reds’ Most Valuable Player in 1956 in recognition of the value of his excellent defensive play. He also received recognition from national baseball writers when he placed sixth in the National League Most Valuable Player Award.

Further national recognition came in 1957 when The Sporting News named him to their All-Star Fielding team and recipient of the Rawlings Gold Glove Award in the first year the award was made. McMillan would win the award again in 1958 and 1959. He was elected to the National League All-Star team in 1956 and 1957.

In 1957, the Reds were once again in first place at mid-season when, McMillan and six of his Redleg teammates—Ed Bailey, Johnny Temple, Don Hoak, Gus Bell, Wally Post and Frank Robinson—were voted into the National League All-Star starting lineup, the result of a ballot stuffing campaign by Reds fans. Bell remained on the team as a reserve, but Post was taken off altogether. Bell and Post were replaced as starters by Hank Aaron and Willie Mays. The Reds faltered after the All-Star break and dropped to fourth place in the season final standings. With the Reds in need of pitching, McMillan was traded on December 15, 1960, to the Milwaukee Braves for Joey Jay (who won 20 games in two straight seasons) and Juan Pizarro.

McMillan also played with the Milwaukee Braves and New York Mets and finished his career in 1966. He played in his final major league game on August 3, 1966, at the age of 37. Dubiously, with 2,093 games played, McMillan is one of fourteen players to have played over two thousand games without ever reaching the postseason (the closest he came was with the 1956 season, where they finished two games out of a pennant).

== Statistics ==
In a 16-year major league career, McMillan played in 2,093 games, accumulating 1,639 hits in 6,752 at bats for a .243 career batting average along with 68 home runs, 594 runs batted in and an on-base percentage of .314. He retired with a .972 fielding percentage.

McMillan ranked 8th overall among major league shortstops in double plays turned. He ranks 16th overall among major league shortstops in assists and, ranks 19th overall in putouts.

== Post-playing career ==
In 1970, McMillan returned to Milwaukee as first-base coach with the Brewers, served as interim skipper in 1972 between Dave Bristol and Del Crandall, then coached for the New York Mets. In 1975, he replaced Yogi Berra as the Mets' interim manager. Late in his career, McMillan was a scout for the Montreal Expos based in Bonham.

McMillan was inducted into the Cincinnati Reds Hall of Fame in 1971 and was subsequently inducted into the Texas Baseball Hall of Fame and the Ohio Baseball Hall of Fame.

McMillan died on November 2, 1997, at the age of 68, having collapsed in his kitchen. He was survived by his wife of 45 years, along with two children and three grandchildren.
