= Ted Kluszewski =

American baseball player (1924–1988)

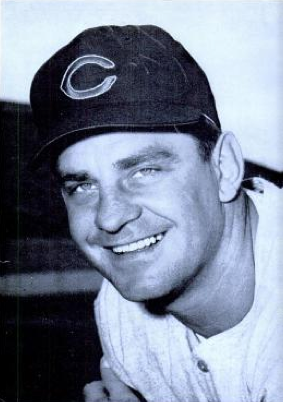
- Kluszewski in 1954
- First baseman
- Born: September 10, 1924; Argo, Illinois, U.S.
- Died: March 29, 1988 (aged 63); Cincinnati, Ohio, U.S.
- Batted: Left Threw: Left

MLB debut
- April 18, 1947, for the Cincinnati Reds

Last MLB appearance
- October 1, 1961, for the Los Angeles Angels

MLB statistics
- Batting average: .298
- Home runs: 279
- Runs batted in: 1,028
- Stats at Baseball Reference

Teams
- As player: Cincinnati Reds / Redlegs (1947–1957); Pittsburgh Pirates (1958–1959); Chicago White Sox (1959–1960); Los Angeles Angels (1961); As coach: Cincinnati Reds (1970–1978, 1983)

Career highlights and awards
- 4× All-Star (1953–1956); 2× World Series champion (1975, 1976); NL home run leader (1954); NL RBI leader (1954); Cincinnati Reds No. 18 retired; Cincinnati Reds Hall of Fame

Theodore Bernard Kluszewski (September 10, 1924 – March 29, 1988), nicknamed "Big Klu", was an American professional baseball player, best known as a power-hitting first baseman for the Cincinnati Reds teams of the 1950s. He played from 1947 through 1961 with four teams in Major League Baseball (MLB), spending 11 of those 15 seasons with the Reds, and became famous for his bulging biceps and mammoth home runs.

Kluszewski was a four-time National League (NL) All-Star who hit at least .300 seven times, and 40 or more home runs in three consecutive seasons. He retired with a .298 lifetime batting average, 279 home runs, and 1,028 runs batted in (RBI) in 1,718 games.

On August 25, 1959, the Chicago White Sox acquired Kluszewski from the Pittsburgh Pirates in return for pitcher Robert Sagers and outfielder Harry Simpson. The veteran hit .297 in 31 games and helped the "Go-Go White Sox" clinch the American League pennant. In six games versus the Los Angeles Dodgers in that year's World Series, Kluszewski hit .391 with three home runs and drove in 10 runs.

Kluszewski ranks among the all-time Reds leaders in home runs (sixth), slugging percentage (sixth), on-base plus slugging percentage (eighth), and RBIs (ninth). His .642 slugging percentage, 1.049 OPS, and home run rate of one per 11.4 at-bats in the 1954 season have been team records for seven decades. In 1962, he was inducted into the Cincinnati Reds Hall of Fame.

== Early life and athletic success ==
Kluszewski was born of Polish descent in Summit, Illinois, 14 miles (23 km) west of Comiskey Park in Chicago, where he played with the White Sox in the 1959 and 1960 seasons. He was a star football and baseball player at Argo Community High School. He went on to Indiana University in Bloomington, where he also played both sports. In 1945, he was part of the Hoosiers football powerhouse that finished with a 9–0–1 record. The same year he hit .443 with their baseball team.

== Minor league career ==
Due to wartime travel restrictions, the Cincinnati Reds, who normally held spring training in Tampa, Florida, were forced to train at Indiana University from 1943 to 1945. As a student-athlete at the college, Kluszewski drew the attention of Reds groundskeeper Matty Schwab, who saw him launch several balls over an embankment near the baseball diamond, a 500-plus-foot distance that none of the Reds players were able to reach at the plate. Team scouts were similarly impressed, but Kluszewski, who also was a standout tight end on the Hoosiers football squad, was reluctant to sign a contract because he did not want to jeopardize his collegiate eligibility. Instead, he waited until after graduation in 1946.

After Kluszewski produced .325 and .377 batting averages in two minor league seasons, it was only a matter of time for his big promotion.

== Trademark fashion statement ==
Early in the 1948 season, the 6 ft 2 in (1.88 m), 225-pound (102 kg) Kluszewski became a regular player. He became noted across the league for his physical strength. When asked to name the five strongest players in baseball, manager Leo Durocher left Kluszewski off his list, later joking, "I'm talking about human beings!"

Much to the chagrin of team management, Kluszewski made a bold fashion statement when he cut off both sleeves of his jersey. He explained that they constricted his enormous biceps and shoulders and limited his ability to swing a baseball bat freely: "They got pretty upset, but it was either that or change my swing — and I wasn't about to change my swing."

== Major League Career ==
=== Cincinnati Reds (1947–1957) ===
In 1947, Kluszewski earned a spot on the Opening Day roster and remained with the Reds in the first month of the season. After a four-month stint at Class AAA Memphis, he returned to the parent club in September. Kluszewski recorded his first hit on Sept. 23 at Crosley Field, an RBI single off Chicago Cubs starter Hank Wyse in the fifth inning. One year later, he nailed down the starter job that would be his for nine seasons.

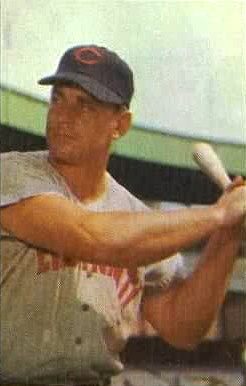
Kluszewski showing his famous short sleeves

It wasn't long before Kluszewski gained the reputation as one of the most unique hitters of his time, one who combined immense power with the ability to make contact on a consistent basis. In 10 of his 15 major league seasons, the first baseman walked (492) more often than he struck out (365). In 1953, Kluszewski hit 40 homers and struck out a mere 34 times. The following season he upped this to 49 homers against just 35 strikeouts. In 1955 he parked 47 home runs and struck out an even 40 times, the last time a major leaguer has hit 40 homers and struck out 40 or fewer times in the same season.

Kluszewski was his most dominant from 1953 through 1956 and was named to the National League All-Star roster in each of the four seasons. In that stretch, he hit a total of 171 home runs, more than any player in the big leagues. He also drove in more than 100 runs each season with a league-high of 141 RBI in the 1954 campaign.

Also in that period, Kluszewski became the first and only player in MLB history to hit 35 or more homers in four seasons in which he had fewer strikeouts than homers. Only three other major leaguers achieved the feat even twice: Lou Gehrig, Joe DiMaggio and Johnny Mize, all Hall of Fame members.

Despite somewhat limited range, Kluszewski was a capable defender who combined sure hands with nimble footwork in the field. He led National League first basemen in fielding percentage five straight years (1951–1955), a major league record. In 1,479 games, he compiled a career .993 fielding percentage, which ranked 99th in major league history at the start of the 2025 season.

Kluszewski had his most dominant season in 1954, when he was the NL Most Valuable Player runner-up. He was in contention for the elusive Triple Crown for much of the season, leading the league in home runs (49) and RBI (141) and finishing fifth in batting average (.326). As late as September 19, he trailed New York Giants star Willie Mays by only eight points (.341–.333) in the batting race. Kluszewski went into a 3-of-20 tailspin down the stretch, while Mays held steady to secure the crown.

In 1956, Kluszewski was headed toward a fourth straight 40-home run season, but after a back issue flared up in September, he hit only .202 and two home runs in the month. He aggravated the injury early in the next season and spent most of the first four weeks as a pinch-hitter. While Kluszewski weighed his medical options, many of his fans offered get-well wishes and "sure cures" for what ailed him.

"On Opening Day, I made a sudden, quick movement to field a ball and the pain was unbearable," Kluszewski recalled. "Finally, it was decided that I had a slipped disc. Some doctors recommended an operation and some didn't. But none would assure me that I would still have as much mobility and I decided against going under the knife."

Kluszewski returned to action on June 12 but was slow to recover. After six consecutive starts, he returned to a pinch-hit role for the remainder of the season. When the veteran was traded after the season, he was widely considered to be the greatest left-handed hitter and among the best fielding first baseman in Reds history. The organization retired his uniform number 18 in a pre-game ceremony on July 18, 1998, at Cinergy Field.

=== Pittsburgh Pirates (1958–1959) ===
On December 28, 1957, Kluszewski was traded to the Pittsburgh Pirates in return for Dee Fondy in a swap of experienced first basemen. In spring training, the 33-year-old reported that his back issues had subsided, which raised hopes that he would approach his former All-Star standards. While the veteran hit a respectable .292 in 100 games, however, the problem persisted and his power numbers were limited as a result. He hit only four home runs in 331 at-bats.

In 1959, Kluszewski appeared in 60 games for the Pirates before he was traded to the Chicago White Sox, who were in the midst of a tight pennant race.

=== Chicago White Sox (1959–1960) ===
When Kluszewski arrived in Chicago, the White Sox had a tenuous two-game lead on the Cleveland Indians in the AL pennant race. Their primary concern was a chronic lack of power, particularly at the left side, where rookie Norm Cash and veteran Earl Torgeson were the only threats to hit an occasional long ball. In Kluszewski, the front office believed it had a potential solution even though all three candidates played the same position.

“We didn't have a regular first baseman,” White Sox pitcher Billy Pierce told Paul Ladewski in a story for the Society for American Baseball Research. “When we got Ted, we all thought it was a very, very good thing for us, because he gave us a strong left-handed hitter with a good reputation. We never thought he was past his prime but that he would help us. We were very glad to have him on our ballclub.”

The trade failed to pay immediate dividends, however, and it was not until his 14th game Kluszewski finally went deep with his new team. He hit a pair of home runs against the Kansas City Athletics in the second game of a doubleheader on Sept. 7 at Comiskey Park. Even though he would not hit another homer in the regular season, Kluszewski fared well enough (.297 batting average) to hold down a starter role.

After the White Sox held off the Indians to claim their first pennant in 40 years, Kluszewski rose to the occasion and then some against the Los Angeles Dodgers in the first World Series of his career. In 25 plate appearances, Kluszewski hit .391, with three home runs, two walks, and 10 RBI.

In his first trip to the plate, Kluszewski singled off starter Roger Craig to give the White Sox a 1–0 lead in the first inning. He triggered a seven-run onslaught two innings later with a towering drive that landed in the lower deck in right field, a three-run homer which knocked Craig out of the game.

In the fourth, Kluszewski launched his second two-run homer in as many innings, a monstrous shot off reliever Chuck Churn that completed an 11–0 rout. "The Los Angeles right-hander throws a curve ... and Kluszewski lets go with another long salvo to right field ... It's a home run into the upper deck!" NBC Radio broadcaster Byrum Saam exclaimed. "Pandemonium breaks loose in Chicago on the South Side!"

The Dodgers pitched more carefully to Kluszewski from that point on, as they elected to take their chances against Sherm Lollar and Al Smith behind him in the order. They won four of the next five games and the series, but not before the first baseman hit another homer in the final contest.

Before the series, local automobile mogul Jim Moran offered a free car to any White Sox player who hit a home run. As he recalled in a 2005 interview with Mike Downey of the Chicago Tribune, Kluszewski received three original 1960 Ford Falcons when all was said and done.

In 1960, Kluszewski was the Opening Day starter at first base, although the veteran was unable to discover his magic of the previous postseason and served primarily a pinch-hitter in the final four months of the season.

The farewell season for Kluszewski in Chicago was not without an unusual major league record, though. White Sox owner Bill Veeck introduced uniforms with the player's last name on the back of the jersey, and on a road trip to New York, Kluszewski became the first player to appear in a game with a misspelled name which had a backwards "z" as well as an "x" instead of the second "k".

When Major League Baseball expanded in the 1960 season, the White Sox left the 36-year-old Kluszewski unprotected in the expansion draft. The Los Angeles Angels chose him at the 45th overall pick, the second first baseman taken, on the belief he would be a good fit for the short power alleys of that city's minor league Wrigley Field the team would use for its inaugural season.

=== Los Angeles Angels (1961) ===
Kluszewski continued to be slowed by back and leg problems in the 1961 season, but his last hurrah produced several historic firsts.

In a telephone interview on the eve of the season opener against the Baltimore Orioles at Memorial Stadium in Baltimore, Kluszewski was asked about his expectations. “If that Milt Pappas is pitching, I'll do alright," The Sporting News quoted him. "I’ve always been able to hit him."

On April 11, with Albie Pearson on first base, Kluszewski stepped to the plate against Pappas in the first inning before hitting a drive deep into the right-field bleachers for the first home run in franchise history. Don Wells called the home run on the Angels radio broadcast:

Big Klu stands in ... On this chilly day, he has that heavy sweatshirt on, no muscles bare here this afternoon... Here's the stretch again ... And the pitch to Klu ... A swing ... A long, long belt! Stay fair!" Wells begged. "Out there! It is ... good-bye, baseball! Kluszewski gets one!

The Angels went on to win their first game by a 7–2 count. One inning later, Kluszewski hit his second homer in as many innings, this one off rookie reliever John Papa with two runners on base.

Kluszewski spent the season as part of a lefty-righty platoon with veteran Steve Bilko at first base. He finished the season with a .243 batting average, 15 homers and 39 RBI in 107 games.

=== Career statistics ===
G	AB	R	H	2B	3B	HR	RBI	BB	BA	OBP	SLG	OPS	TB	FLD%	Ref.
1718	5929	848	1766	290	29	279	1028	492	.298	.353	.498	.850	2951	.993	

== Personal life ==
In 1958, Kluszewski became a partner in Ted Kluszewski's Steak House in the Walnut Hills neighborhood of Cincinnati, a business venture that lasted 21 years. The popular eatery had five locations at both sides of the Ohio River and reportedly served more than 1,000 pounds of beef on a weekly basis.

After his retirement as a player, Kluszewski returned to the Cincinnati Reds as batting coach in 1970 and remained in that capacity for nine seasons. It was under his tutelage that the so-called Big Red Machine became one of the most potent offenses of the expansion era and won consecutive World Series titles in the 1975 and 1976 campaigns.

"There are a lot of coaches who have received more notoriety than Klu, but I don't think anyone's had more success," said three-time batting champion Pete Rose, one of his prized pupils. "He was just a prince. I never heard a bad word said about him. He was a nice man, a gentle man."

In 1979, largely because of health reasons, Kluszewski took on a less strenuous role as the Reds minor league hitting instructor. He served in the position until 1986, when a massive heart attack resulted in emergency bypass surgery that prompted him to leave baseball permanently. On March 29 two years later, the 63-year-old Kluszewski was stricken by a second heart attack and died at a suburban Cincinnati hospital.

== MLB highlights and records ==
=== Highlights ===
- NL All-Star (1953, 1954, 1955, 1956)
- NL leader in home runs (1954)
- NL leader in RBIs (1954)
- NL leader in hits (1955)
- NL leader in putouts as first baseman (1951, 1955)
- NL leader in fielding average as first baseman (1951, 1952, 1953, 1954, 1955)
- AL pennant team (1959)
- First home run in Los Angeles Angels history (1961)

=== Records ===
- MLB: three home runs by four team members in single game in same season: 1950 Dodgers, 1956 Reds (Gus Bell, Ted Kluszewski, Ed Bailey, and Bob Thurman), and 2001 Brewers
- NL: five-time leader in fielding average as a first baseman (1951–1955)
- NL: 17 consecutive games scoring runs (1955)

== Other honors and recognitions ==
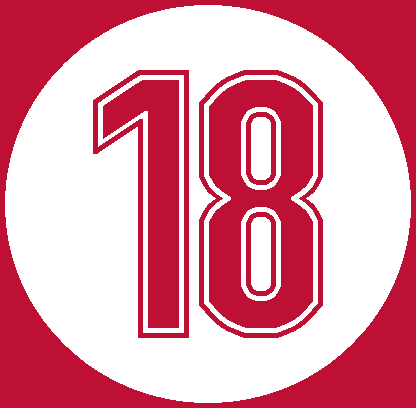
Ted Kluszewski's number 18 was retired by the Cincinnati Reds in 1998.

1962: Ted Kluszewski is inducted into the Cincinnati Reds Hall of Fame and Museum.

1974: Ted Kluszewski was inducted into the National Polish-American Sports Hall of Fame.

1981: "Ted Kluszewski" is in first line of the chorus to Terry Cashman's song, "Talkin' Baseball", a musical tribute to baseball.

1998: On July 18, Kluszewski's number 18 was retired by the Cincinnati Reds at a pregame ceremony at Cinergy Field. His widow, Elenor Guckel, threw out the ceremonial first pitch before the game between the San Diego Padres and the Cincinnati Reds.

Ted Kluszewski's statue outside the Great American Ball Park

2003: Great American Ball Park, the home of the Cincinnati Reds, opened on March 31. Before the inaugural game, the Reds dedicated a bronze statue of Kluszewski on the Crosley Terrace area outside the main gate. Statues of Crosley Field era stars Ernie Lombardi, Joe Nuxhall, Frank Robinson, and Pete Rose were erected later. The statues were sculpted by Cincinnati artist Tom Tsuchiya.

== See also ==
- List of Major League Baseball annual runs batted in leaders
- List of Major League Baseball annual home run leaders
- List of Major League Baseball career home run leaders
- List of Major League Baseball career runs batted in leaders
- List of Major League Baseball retired numbers
