= Wally Post =

American baseball player (1929–1982)

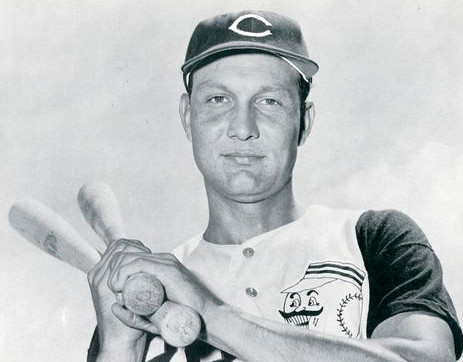
- Right fielder
- Born: July 9, 1929; Wendelin, Ohio, U.S.
- Died: January 6, 1982 (aged 52); St. Henry, Ohio, U.S.
- Batted: Right Threw: Right

MLB debut
- September 18, 1949, for the Cincinnati Reds

Last MLB appearance
- May 9, 1964, for the Cleveland Indians

MLB statistics
- Batting average: .266
- Home Runs: 210
- Runs batted in: 699
- Stats at Baseball Reference

Teams
- Cincinnati Redlegs (1949, 1951–1957); Philadelphia Phillies (1958–1960); Cincinnati Reds (1960–1963); Minnesota Twins (1963); Cleveland Indians (1964)

Career highlights and awards
- Cincinnati Reds Hall of Fame

Walter Charles Post (July 9, 1929 – January 6, 1982) was an American professional baseball player. He played in Major League Baseball as a right fielder from 1949 to 1964, most prominently as a member of the Cincinnati Reds, where he was one of the most prolific power hitters in team history, and was an integral member of the 1961 National League pennant-winning team.

Post formed a power-hitting tandem with Frank Robinson for the Reds teams of the 1950s and early 1960s. Post was also notable for his long distance home runs.

He also played for the Philadelphia Phillies, Minnesota Twins and the Cleveland Indians. Post was inducted into the Cincinnati Reds Hall of Fame in 1965.

== Career ==
Post is a native of Wendelin, Ohio, and played baseball for St. Henry High School. He spent most of his career with Cincinnati teams. A powerful slugger in the mid-1950s, he also was respected for his strong and accurate throwing arm.

Post broke into professional baseball as a minor league pitcher in 1946 and was converted to an outfielder in 1949, the year of his majors debut. Post spent time in both the minor and major leagues for the next two years before finally being permanently called up to Cincinnati in 1954. His most productive season came in 1955, when he hit .309 with 40 home runs with 109 RBI, all career highs.

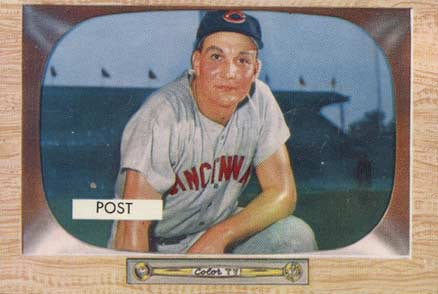
A baseball card of Post

In 1957, Post and six of his Redleg teammates—Ed Bailey, Johnny Temple, Roy McMillan, Don Hoak, Gus Bell and Frank Robinson—were "voted" starters on the National League All-Star team, the result of a ballot stuffing campaign by Redlegs fans. Major League Baseball Commissioner Ford Frick intervened, removing Bell and Post from the starting lineup and replacing them with Hank Aaron and Willie Mays. Frick allowed Bell to remain on the team as a reserve, while Post was injured and would have been unable to play in any event.

On April 14, 1961, Post hit one of the longest recorded home runs in baseball history at Busch Stadium in St. Louis. The mammoth blast was estimated at 569 ft. Post is also noted as the man who ended Aaron's record-setting stint on the 1950s Home Run Derby show.

Post also hit the first home run at Dodger Stadium in Los Angeles on April 10, 1962. After playing for the Phillies, Twins, Indians, and in a second stint with the Reds, Post retired in 1963. He was inducted into the Cincinnati Reds Hall of Fame in 1965. In a 15-season career, Post was a .266 hitter with 210 home runs and 699 RBI in 1,204 games.

Following his baseball career, Post worked in management at his father-in-law's business, the Minster Canning Company of Minster, Ohio. Post died in St. Henry, Ohio in 1982. He had been undergoing treatments for cancer. He was married to Patricia (Beckman) and they had four children together: Sue, John, Mary, and Cynthia. Post has 13 grandchildren and nine great-grandchildren. One of his grandchildren is former Ohio State and NFL quarterback Bobby Hoying.
