= 1979 Philadelphia Phillies season =

1979 Philadelphia Phillies
- League: National League
- Division: East
- Ballpark: Veterans Stadium
- City: Philadelphia
- Owners: R. R. M. "Ruly" Carpenter III
- General managers: Paul Owens
- Managers: Danny Ozark, Dallas Green
- Television: WPHL-TV
- Radio: KYW (Harry Kalas, Richie Ashburn, Andy Musser, Chris Wheeler)

The 1979 Philadelphia Phillies season was the 97th season in the history of the franchise, and the 9th season for the Philadelphia Phillies at Veterans Stadium. The team finished fourth in the National League East, 14 games behind the first-place and eventual World Series champion Pittsburgh Pirates.

== Offseason ==
Prior to the 1979 season, Pete Rose signed a four-year, $3.2-million contract with the Philadelphia Phillies, temporarily making him the highest-paid athlete in team sports. The Phillies were in the middle of the greatest era in the history of the franchise when Rose came on board. They had won the National League East three years running (1976–78) two of which were won with 101 win seasons.

The Phillies entered the 1979 season with one of the strongest lineups in the league with the addition of Rose but with numerous injuries on the pitching staff. AP sports writer Hal Bock picked the Phils to finish second behind the Pirates as the Phillies would enter the season with pitchers Larry Christenson, prospect Jim Wright, and Dick Ruthven all injured.

=== Notable transactions ===
- December 4, 1978: Jeff Schneider was drafted from the Phillies by the Baltimore Orioles in the 1978 rule 5 draft.
- December 5, 1978: Carmelo Castillo was drafted by the Cleveland Indians from the Philadelphia Phillies in the 1978 minor league draft.
- December 5, 1978: Pete Rose was signed as a free agent by the Phillies.
- December 6, 1978: Joe Charboneau was traded by the Phillies to the Cleveland Indians for Cardell Camper.
- January 9, 1979: Mark Davis was drafted by the Phillies in the 1st round (1st pick) of the secondary phase of the 1979 Major League Baseball draft.
- February 23, 1979: Barry Foote, Ted Sizemore, Jerry Martin, Derek Botelho, and Henry Mack (minors) were traded by the Phillies to the Chicago Cubs for Manny Trillo, Greg Gross and Dave Rader.
- March 27, 1979: Richie Hebner and José Moreno were traded by the Phillies to the New York Mets for Nino Espinosa.
- March 27, 1979: Rudy Meoli was signed as a free agent by the Phillies.
- March 28, 1979: Dan Boitano was traded by the Phillies to the Milwaukee Brewers for Gary Beare.
- March 29, 1979: Del Unser was signed as a free agent by the Phillies.

== Regular season ==
**Richie**
**Ashburn**
OF, TV
Retired 1979

On April 18, in a victory versus the Pirates, Greg Luzinski became the first visiting player to hit a home run into the fifth level of Three Rivers Stadium.

On May 17, 1979, the Phillies beat the Cubs 23–22 at Wrigley Field in ten innings with a 30-mph wind blowing out to left field. After the game, the Phils were 14 games over .500 and in first place by 3 1/2 games over the Montreal Expos.

On July 10, Del Unser hit his third consecutive pinch hit home run. Unser tied a Major League Baseball record with homers in three straight pinch at bats. The at bats were on June 30, July 5, and July 10.

By August 29, the team had fallen to fifth place and two games under .500, 12 1/2 games behind the Pirates. Mid-season injuries to Manny Trillo, Larry Bowa, and Greg Luzinski contributed to hurt the club. The team's decline led to the firing of manager Danny Ozark on August 31 who was replaced by Dallas Green. Green was named interim manager, a position made permanent shortly after the end of the season.

=== Alternate uniforms ===
The Phillies front office introduced an alternate all-burgundy version of the team uniform for the 1979 season to be worn for Saturday games. They were called "Saturday Night Specials", in a derisive nod to cheap handguns then called by that name and were worn for the first and last time on May 19, 1979, a 10–5 loss to the Expos. The immediate reaction of the media, fans, and players alike was negative, with many describing the despised uniforms as pajama-like.

=== Season standings ===
NL East
| Team | W | L | Pct. | GB | Home | Road |
|---|---|---|---|---|---|---|
| Pittsburgh Pirates | 98 | 64 | .605 | — | 48‍–‍33 | 50‍–‍31 |
| Montreal Expos | 95 | 65 | .594 | 2 | 56‍–‍25 | 39‍–‍40 |
| St. Louis Cardinals | 86 | 76 | .531 | 12 | 42‍–‍39 | 44‍–‍37 |
| Philadelphia Phillies | 84 | 78 | .519 | 14 | 43‍–‍38 | 41‍–‍40 |
| Chicago Cubs | 80 | 82 | .494 | 18 | 45‍–‍36 | 35‍–‍46 |
| New York Mets | 63 | 99 | .389 | 35 | 28‍–‍53 | 35‍–‍46 |

=== Record vs. opponents ===
1979 National League record Sources:
| Team | ATL | CHC | CIN | HOU | LAD | MON | NYM | PHI | PIT | SD | SF | STL |
|---|---|---|---|---|---|---|---|---|---|---|---|---|
| Atlanta | — | 4–8 | 6–12 | 7–11 | 12–6 | 1–9 | 4–8 | 7–5 | 4–8 | 6–12 | 11–7 | 4–8 |
| Chicago | 8–4 | — | 7–5 | 6–6 | 5–7 | 6–12 | 8–10 | 9–9 | 6–12 | 9–3 | 8–4 | 8–10 |
| Cincinnati | 12–6 | 5–7 | — | 8–10 | 11–7 | 6–6 | 8–4 | 8–4 | 8–4 | 10–7 | 6–12 | 8–4 |
| Houston | 11–7 | 6–6 | 10–8 | — | 10–8 | 7–5 | 9–3 | 5–7 | 4–8 | 14–4 | 7–11 | 6–6 |
| Los Angeles | 6–12 | 7–5 | 7–11 | 8–10 | — | 6–6 | 9–3 | 3–9 | 4–8 | 9–9 | 14–4 | 6–6 |
| Montreal | 9–1 | 12–6 | 6–6 | 5–7 | 6–6 | — | 15–3 | 11–7 | 7–11 | 7–5 | 7–5 | 10–8 |
| New York | 8–4 | 10–8 | 4–8 | 3–9 | 3–9 | 3–15 | — | 5–13 | 8–10 | 4–8 | 8–4 | 7–11 |
| Philadelphia | 5–7 | 9–9 | 4–8 | 7–5 | 9–3 | 7–11 | 13–5 | — | 8–10 | 9–3 | 6–6 | 7–11 |
| Pittsburgh | 8–4 | 12–6 | 4–8 | 8–4 | 8–4 | 11–7 | 10–8 | 10–8 | — | 7–5 | 9–3 | 11–7 |
| San Diego | 12–6 | 3–9 | 7–10 | 4–14 | 9–9 | 5–7 | 8–4 | 3–9 | 5–7 | — | 8–10 | 4–8 |
| San Francisco | 7–11 | 4–8 | 12–6 | 11–7 | 4–14 | 5–7 | 4–8 | 6–6 | 3–9 | 10–8 | — | 5–7 |
| St. Louis | 8–4 | 10–8 | 4–8 | 6–6 | 6–6 | 8–10 | 11–7 | 11–7 | 7–11 | 8–4 | 7–5 | — |

=== Notable transactions ===
- April 3, 1979: Todd Cruz was traded by the Phillies to the Kansas City Royals for Doug Bird.
- May 11, 1979: Jim Kaat was purchased from the Phillies by the New York Yankees.
- June 5, 1979: Roy Smith was drafted by the Phillies in the 3rd round of the 1979 Major League Baseball draft. Player signed on July 30.
- June 16, 1979: Jim Lonborg was released by the Phillies.
- June 29, 1979: Rudy Meoli was purchased from the Phillies by the Minnesota Twins.

=== 1979 Game Log ===
Legend
| | Phillies win |
| | Phillies loss |
| | Phillies tie |
| | Postponement |
| **Bold** | Phillies team member |

1979 Game Log
Overall Record: 84–78
April (14–5)

| # | Date | Opponent | Score | Win | Loss | Save | Attendance | Record |
|---|---|---|---|---|---|---|---|---|
| 1 | April 6 | @ Cardinals | 1–8 | John Denny (1–0) | **Steve Carlton** (0–1) | None | 40,526 | 0–1 |
| 2 | April 7 | @ Cardinals | 2–3 | Pete Vuckovich (1–0) | **Ron Reed** (0–1) | None | 15,294 | 0–2 |
| 3 | April 8 | @ Cardinals | 2–2 (5) | None | None | None | 20,055 | 0–2 |
| – | April 9 | Pirates | Postponed (rain); Makeup: April 10 | | | | | |
| 4 | April 10 | Pirates | 7–3 | **Dick Ruthven** (1–0) | Enrique Romo (0–2) | None | 48,235 | 1–2 |
| 5 | April 11 | Pirates | 5–4 | **Steve Carlton** (1–1) | Bert Blyleven (0–1) | None | 26,281 | 2–2 |
| 6 | April 12 | @ Mets | 2–3 | Pat Zachry (2–0) | **Randy Lerch** (0–1) | None | 8,719 | 2–3 |
| – | April 14 | @ Mets | Postponed (rain); Makeup: August 2 as a traditional double-header | | | | | |
| 7 | April 15 (1) | @ Mets | 3–2 | **Dick Ruthven** (2–0) | Craig Swan (1–1) | **Tug McGraw** (1) | see 2nd game | 3–3 |
| 8 | April 15 (2) | @ Mets | 6–3 | **Nino Espinosa** (1–0) | Neil Allen (0–1) | **Ron Reed** (1) | 18,401 | 4–3 |
| – | April 16 | @ Pirates | Postponed (rain); Makeup: August 3 as a traditional double-header | | | | | |
| 9 | April 17 | @ Pirates | 13–2 | **Steve Carlton** (2–1) | Bert Blyleven (0–2) | None | 7,739 | 5–3 |
| 10 | April 18 | @ Pirates | 3–2 | **Randy Lerch** (1–1) | Don Robinson (1–1) | None | 12,195 | 6–3 |
| 11 | April 20 | Mets | 8–0 | **Dick Ruthven** (3–0) | Craig Swan (1–2) | None | 33,253 | 7–3 |
| 12 | April 21 | Mets | 3–0 | **Nino Espinosa** (2–0) | Neil Allen (0–2) | **Tug McGraw** (2) | 31,851 | 8–3 |
| 13 | April 22 | Mets | 2–4 | Jesse Orosco (1–0) | **Steve Carlton** (2–2) | Skip Lockwood (2) | 35,020 | 8–4 |
| 14 | April 23 | Dodgers | 4–3 (10) | **Tug McGraw** (1–0) | Lance Rautzhan (0–2) | None | 32,826 | 9–4 |
| 15 | April 24 | Dodgers | 7–6 (10) | **Ron Reed** (1–1) | Jerry Reuss (1–2) | None | 31,140 | 10–4 |
| 16 | April 25 | Dodgers | 5–4 | **Ron Reed** (2–1) | Rick Sutcliffe (1–1) | None | 34,303 | 11–4 |
| 17 | April 27 | Padres | 2–0 | **Nino Espinosa** (3–0) | Gaylord Perry (2–1) | None | 28,522 | 12–4 |
| 18 | April 28 | Padres | 0–5 | John D'Acquisto (2–1) | **Steve Carlton** (2–3) | None | 31,633 | 12–5 |
| 19 | April 29 | Padres | 4–3 | **Ron Reed** (3–1) | Rollie Fingers (1–2) | None | 50,722 | 13–5 |
| 20 | April 30 | Giants | 4–1 | **Dick Ruthven** (4–0) | Philip Nastu (0–1) | **Tug McGraw** (3) | 29,169 | 14–5 |

May (13–15)

| # | Date | Opponent | Score | Win | Loss | Save | Attendance | Record |
|---|---|---|---|---|---|---|---|---|
| 21 | May 1 | Giants | 0–7 | Bob Knepper (2–2) | **Nino Espinosa** (3–1) | None | 29,048 | 14–6 |
| 22 | May 3 | @ Dodgers | 2–5 | Rick Sutcliffe (2–2) | **Steve Carlton** (2–4) | None | 41,215 | 14–7 |
| 23 | May 4 | @ Dodgers | 5–2 | **Randy Lerch** (2–1) | Don Sutton (3–3) | None | 42,717 | 15–7 |
| 24 | May 5 | @ Dodgers | 11–0 | **Dick Ruthven** (5–0) | Andy Messersmith (1–2) | None | 45,169 | 16–7 |
| 25 | May 6 | @ Dodgers | 4–0 | **Nino Espinosa** (4–1) | Doug Rau (0–4) | None | 42,184 | 17–7 |
| 26 | May 7 | @ Padres | 11–6 | **Steve Carlton** (3–4) | Bob Owchinko (0–1) | **Rawly Eastwick** (1) | 20,766 | 18–7 |
| 27 | May 8 | @ Padres | 9–8 (12) | **Jim Kaat** (1–0) | John D'Acquisto (2–3) | None | 12,288 | 19–7 |
| 28 | May 9 | @ Padres | 2–0 | **Dick Ruthven** (6–0) | Eric Rasmussen (0–3) | None | 15,606 | 20–7 |
| 29 | May 10 | @ Padres | 3–2 | **Nino Espinosa** (5–1) | Gaylord Perry (3–3) | **Ron Reed** (2) | 17,208 | 21–7 |
| 30 | May 11 | @ Giants | 1–2 | Bob Knepper (3–2) | **Steve Carlton** (3–5) | Gary Lavelle (4) | 22,860 | 21–8 |
| 31 | May 12 | @ Giants | 1–4 | Ed Halicki (3–3) | **Randy Lerch** (2–2) | None | 23,836 | 21–9 |
| 32 | May 13 | @ Giants | 12–3 | **Ron Reed** (4–1) | Vida Blue (6–3) | None | 32,585 | 22–9 |
| 33 | May 15 | @ Cubs | 1–7 | Lynn McGlothen (5–4) | **Nino Espinosa** (5–2) | None | 13,834 | 22–10 |
| 34 | May 16 | @ Cubs | 13–0 | **Steve Carlton** (4–5) | Rick Reuschel (2–5) | None | 18,015 | 23–10 |
| 35 | May 17 | @ Cubs | 23–22 (10) | **Rawly Eastwick** (1–0) | Bruce Sutter (1–1) | None | 14,952 | 24–10 |
| 36 | May 18 | Expos | 3–5 | Stan Bahnsen (1–1) | **Dick Ruthven** (6–1) | Elías Sosa (4) | 31,481 | 24–11 |
| 37 | May 19 | Expos | 5–10 | Rudy May (2–0) | **Rawly Eastwick** (1–1) | Dan Schatzeder (1) | 33,212 | 24–12 |
| 38 | May 20 | Expos | 6–10 | Stan Bahnsen (2–1) | **Nino Espinosa** (5–3) | Elías Sosa (5) | 48,631 | 24–13 |
| 39 | May 21 | Cardinals | 5–3 | **Steve Carlton** (5–5) | John Denny (3–3) | None | 28,192 | 25–13 |
| 40 | May 22 | Cardinals | 3–1 | **Tug McGraw** (2–0) | Bob Forsch (1–4) | None | 33,379 | 26–13 |
| 41 | May 23 | Cardinals | 1–3 | Silvio Martínez (2–1) | **Dick Ruthven** (6–2) | Mark Littell (3) | 32,349 | 26–14 |
| 42 | May 25 | Cubs | 0–3 | Lynn McGlothen (6–5) | **Nino Espinosa** (5–4) | Bruce Sutter (8) | 34,456 | 26–15 |
| 43 | May 26 | Cubs | 1–4 | Dennis Lamp (4–1) | **Larry Christenson** (0–1) | Dick Tidrow (3) | 32,313 | 26–16 |
| 44 | May 27 | Cubs | 6–4 | **Steve Carlton** (6–5) | Bill Caudill (0–1) | None | 47,087 | 27–16 |
| 45 | May 28 | Cubs | 1–4 | Dick Tidrow (3–1) | **Randy Lerch** (2–3) | Bruce Sutter (9) | 51,381 | 27–17 |
| 46 | May 29 | @ Expos | 0–9 | Steve Rogers (5–2) | **Dick Ruthven** (6–3) | None | 32,078 | 27–18 |
| 47 | May 30 | @ Expos | 0–2 | Bill Lee (5–2) | **Nino Espinosa** (5–5) | None | 21,761 | 27–19 |
| 48 | May 31 | @ Expos | 0–1 | Scott Sanderson (4–3) | **Larry Christenson** (0–2) | None | 22,388 | 27–20 |

June (12–16)

| # | Date | Opponent | Score | Win | Loss | Save | Attendance | Record |
|---|---|---|---|---|---|---|---|---|
| 49 | June 1 | @ Reds | 2–4 | Doug Bair (3–0) | **Steve Carlton** (6–6) | Pedro Borbón (2) | 48,968 | 27–21 |
| 50 | June 2 | @ Reds | 2–4 | Mike LaCoss (6–0) | **Randy Lerch** (2–4) | Doug Bair (7) | 37,907 | 27–22 |
| 51 | June 3 (1) | @ Reds | 6–4 | **Ron Reed** (5–1) | Pedro Borbón (2–2) | **Tug McGraw** (4) | see 2nd game | 28–22 |
| 52 | June 3 (2) | @ Reds | 2–12 | Tom Hume (4–4) | **Jim Lonborg** (0–1) | None | 50,262 | 28–23 |
| 53 | June 4 | @ Astros | 0–3 | Randy Niemann (2–0) | **Larry Christenson** (0–3) | None | 19,062 | 28–24 |
| 54 | June 5 | @ Astros | 8–0 | **Steve Carlton** (7–6) | Rick Williams (2–2) | None | 28,244 | 29–24 |
| 55 | June 6 | @ Astros | 3–4 | Joe Sambito (3–2) | **Ron Reed** (5–2) | Bert Roberge (2) | 28,955 | 29–25 |
| 56 | June 8 | Braves | 5–11 (10) | Gene Garber (3–7) | **Ron Reed** (5–3) | None | 41,136 | 29–26 |
| 57 | June 9 | Braves | 9–3 | **Larry Christenson** (1–3) | Mickey Mahler (2–6) | None | 38,035 | 30–26 |
| 58 | June 10 | Braves | 3–10 | Phil Niekro (7–9) | **Steve Carlton** (7–7) | None | 58,707 | 30–27 |
| 59 | June 11 | Astros | 4–2 | **Randy Lerch** (3–4) | J. R. Richard (6–5) | None | 31,085 | 31–27 |
| 60 | June 12 | Astros | 4–0 | **Nino Espinosa** (6–5) | Rick Williams (2–3) | None | 34,177 | 32–27 |
| 61 | June 13 | Astros | 3–4 | Joe Niekro (10–2) | **Dick Ruthven** (6–4) | None | 33,627 | 32–28 |
| 62 | June 15 | Reds | 3–6 | Tom Seaver (4–5) | **Larry Christenson** (1–4) | None | 50,222 | 32–29 |
| 63 | June 16 | Reds | 4–3 | **Tug McGraw** (3–0) | Doug Bair (3–1) | None | 50,224 | 33–29 |
| 64 | June 17 | Reds | 9–3 | **Randy Lerch** (4–4) | Doug Bair (3–2) | None | 46,153 | 34–29 |
| 65 | June 18 | @ Braves | 5–10 | Rick Matula (4–5) | **Nino Espinosa** (6–6) | None | 9,394 | 34–30 |
| 66 | June 19 | @ Braves | 4–10 | Phil Niekro (8–9) | **Larry Christenson** (1–5) | None | 8,146 | 34–31 |
| 67 | June 20 | @ Braves | 10–4 | **Steve Carlton** (8–7) | Eddie Solomon (3–3) | None | 8,681 | 35–31 |
| 68 | June 22 | @ Expos | 5–6 | Ross Grimsley (7–4) | **Randy Lerch** (4–5) | Elías Sosa (7) | 40,729 | 35–32 |
| 69 | June 23 | @ Expos | 0–3 | Steve Rogers (7–4) | **Nino Espinosa** (6–7) | None | 24,439 | 35–33 |
| 70 | June 24 | @ Expos | 5–2 | **Larry Christenson** (2–5) | Bill Lee (7–4) | **Tug McGraw** (5) | 41,593 | 36–33 |
| 71 | June 25 | @ Cubs | 2–8 | Lynn McGlothen (8–6) | **Steve Carlton** (8–8) | None | 27,246 | 36–34 |
| 72 | June 26 | @ Cubs | 5–3 | **Dick Ruthven** (7–4) | Donnie Moore (1–3) | **Tug McGraw** (6) | 35,970 | 37–34 |
| 73 | June 27 | @ Cubs | 4–11 | Mike Krukow (5–5) | **Randy Lerch** (4–6) | None | 29,858 | 37–35 |
| 74 | June 29 (1) | @ Cardinals | 8–7 | **Kevin Saucier** (1–0) | Bob Forsch (3–8) | **Tug McGraw** (7) | see 2nd game | 38–35 |
| 75 | June 29 (2) | @ Cardinals | 1–7 | Pete Vuckovich (7–4) | **Larry Christenson** (2–6) | None | 29,300 | 38–36 |
| 76 | June 30 | @ Cardinals | 6–4 (10) | **Ron Reed** (6–3) | George Frazier (0–1) | **Tug McGraw** (8) | 30,960 | 39–36 |

July (15–13)

| # | Date | Opponent | Score | Win | Loss | Save | Attendance | Record |
|---|---|---|---|---|---|---|---|---|
| 77 | July 1 (1) | @ Cardinals | 7–13 | Mark Littell (5–2) | **Tug McGraw** (3–1) | None | see 2nd game | 39–37 |
| 78 | July 1 (2) | @ Cardinals | 1–2 | Mark Littell (6–2) | **Randy Lerch** (4–7) | None | 41,903 | 39–38 |
| 79 | July 2 | Mets | 6–2 | **Nino Espinosa** (7–7) | Dock Ellis (1–6) | None | 29,142 | 40–38 |
| 80 | July 3 | Mets | 4–2 | **Warren Brusstar** (1–0) | Wayne Twitchell (3–2) | **Tug McGraw** (9) | 56,285 | 41–38 |
| 81 | July 4 | Mets | 1–0 | **Steve Carlton** (9–8) | Andy Hassler (2–4) | None | 40,215 | 42–38 |
| 82 | July 5 | Mets | 2–3 | Craig Swan (8–6) | **Dickie Noles** (0–1) | None | 28,720 | 42–39 |
| 83 | July 6 | Giants | 6–1 | **Nino Espinosa** (8–7) | John Curtis (4–5) | None | 36,097 | 43–39 |
| 84 | July 7 | Giants | 6–8 | Pedro Borbón (4–2) | **Ron Reed** (6–4) | None | 42,047 | 43–40 |
| 85 | July 8 | Giants | 5–3 | **Steve Carlton** (10–8) | Bob Knepper (6–3) | None | 41,387 | 44–40 |
| 86 | July 9 | Giants | 4–2 | **Dickie Noles** (1–1) | Vida Blue (7–7) | **Warren Brusstar** (1) | 38,353 | 45–40 |
| 87 | July 10 | Padres | 6–5 | **Doug Bird** (1–0) | Rollie Fingers (7–6) | None | 30,234 | 46–40 |
| 88 | July 11 | Padres | 3–7 | John D'Acquisto (6–5) | **Randy Lerch** (4–8) | None | 35,248 | 46–41 |
| 89 | July 12 | Padres | 4–3 | **Steve Carlton** (11–8) | Rollie Fingers (7–7) | **Tug McGraw** (10) | 33,501 | 47–41 |
| 90 | July 13 | Dodgers | 3–2 | **Dickie Noles** (2–1) | Rick Sutcliffe (8–8) | **Tug McGraw** (11) | 46,542 | 48–41 |
| 91 | July 14 | Dodgers | 10–7 | **Nino Espinosa** (9–7) | Don Sutton (7–11) | **Tug McGraw** (12) | 40,602 | 49–41 |
| 92 | July 15 | Dodgers | 10–3 | **Randy Lerch** (5–8) | Bob Welch (4–6) | **Rawly Eastwick** (2) | 47,315 | 50–41 |
| – | July 17 | **1979 Major League Baseball All-Star Game at the Kingdome in Seattle** | | | | | | |
| 93 | July 19 | @ Giants | 0–1 | John Curtis (6–5) | **Dickie Noles** (2–2) | None | 20,732 | 50–42 |
| 94 | July 20 | @ Giants | 6–4 | **Randy Lerch** (6–8) | Tom Griffin (4–5) | **Ron Reed** (3) | 21,110 | 51–42 |
| 95 | July 21 | @ Giants | 1–4 | Bob Knepper (7–4) | **Steve Carlton** (11–9) | None | 25,386 | 51–43 |
| 96 | July 22 | @ Padres | 5–2 | **Nino Espinosa** (10–7) | John D'Acquisto (6–7) | **Tug McGraw** (13) | 23,308 | 52–43 |
| 97 | July 23 | @ Padres | 5–6 | Rollie Fingers (8–7) | **Ron Reed** (6–5) | None | 16,785 | 52–44 |
| 98 | July 24 | @ Dodgers | 3–15 | Burt Hooton (9–7) | **Randy Lerch** (6–9) | None | 39,336 | 52–45 |
| 99 | July 25 | @ Dodgers | 8–16 | Rick Sutcliffe (9–8) | **Dick Ruthven** (7–5) | None | 34,370 | 52–46 |
| 100 | July 27 | Cardinals | 0–5 | Bob Forsch (4–9) | **Nino Espinosa** (10–8) | None | 40,792 | 52–47 |
| 101 | July 28 | Cardinals | 4–5 | Mark Littell (7–3) | **Ron Reed** (6–6) | None | 40,063 | 52–48 |
| 102 | July 29 | Cardinals | 5–6 | Pete Vuckovich (10–7) | **Randy Lerch** (6–10) | None | 38,069 | 52–49 |
| 103 | July 30 | Cubs | 5–4 (10) | **Ron Reed** (7–6) | Bruce Sutter (4–3) | None | 37,151 | 53–49 |
| 104 | July 31 | Cubs | 4–1 | **Nino Espinosa** (11–8) | Mike Krukow (8–6) | None | 37,412 | 54–49 |

August (12–18)

| # | Date | Opponent | Score | Win | Loss | Save | Attendance | Record |
|---|---|---|---|---|---|---|---|---|
| 105 | August 1 | @ Mets | 9–6 | **Dickie Noles** (3–2) | Dock Ellis (2–9) | **Rawly Eastwick** (3) | 12,295 | 55–49 |
| 106 | August 2 (1) | @ Mets | 7–4 | **Ron Reed** (8–6) | Andy Hassler (4–5) | None | see 2nd game | 56–49 |
| 107 | August 2 (2) | @ Mets | 1–2 | Pete Falcone (3–7) | **Kevin Saucier** (1–1) | Neil Allen (2) | 15,319 | 56–50 |
| 108 | August 3 (1) | @ Pirates | 3–6 | Enrique Romo (7–3) | **Tug McGraw** (3–2) | None | see 2nd game | 56–51 |
| 109 | August 3 (2) | @ Pirates | 1–5 | Jim Bibby (8–2) | **Larry Christenson** (2–7) | None | 45,309 | 56–52 |
| 110 | August 4 | @ Pirates | 0–4 | John Candelaria (10–7) | **Nino Espinosa** (11–9) | None | 34,754 | 56–53 |
| 111 | August 5 (1) | @ Pirates | 8–12 | Kent Tekulve (5–6) | **Rawly Eastwick** (1–2) | None | see 2nd game | 56–54 |
| 112 | August 5 (2) | @ Pirates | 2–5 | Enrique Romo (8–3) | **Dickie Noles** (3–3) | Kent Tekulve (20) | 46,006 | 56–55 |
| 113 | August 7 | Expos | 4–2 | **Larry Christenson** (3–7) | Scott Sanderson (7–7) | None | 38,237 | 57–55 |
| 114 | August 8 | Expos | 4–3 | **Ron Reed** (9–6) | Elías Sosa (5–7) | None | 36,476 | 58–55 |
| 115 | August 9 | Expos | 6–4 | **Nino Espinosa** (12–9) | Bill Lee (10–9) | **Rawly Eastwick** (4) | 46,233 | 59–55 |
| 116 | August 10 (1) | Pirates | 4–3 (12) | **Rawly Eastwick** (2–2) | Grant Jackson (6–4) | None | see 2nd game | 60–55 |
| 117 | August 10 (2) | Pirates | 2–3 | Bruce Kison (7–6) | **Randy Lerch** (6–11) | Kent Tekulve (21) | 63,346 | 60–56 |
| 118 | August 11 | Pirates | 11–14 | Enrique Romo (9–3) | **Rawly Eastwick** (2–3) | Kent Tekulve (22) | 51,118 | 60–57 |
| – | August 12 | Pirates | Postponed (rain); Makeup: September 19 as a traditional double-header | | | | | |
| 119 | August 13 | Pirates | 1–9 | Jim Bibby (9–2) | **Larry Christenson** (3–8) | None | 43,111 | 60–58 |
| 120 | August 14 | @ Reds | 1–2 (10) | Tom Hume (7–6) | **Steve Carlton** (11–10) | None | 38,442 | 60–59 |
| 121 | August 15 | @ Reds | 3–2 | **Nino Espinosa** (13–9) | Fred Norman (10–9) | None | 36,678 | 61–59 |
| 122 | August 17 | @ Astros | 5–2 | **Randy Lerch** (7–11) | Frank LaCorte (1–1) | None | 33,782 | 62–59 |
| 123 | August 18 | @ Astros | 1–0 | **Larry Christenson** (4–8) | J. R. Richard (12–12) | **Ron Reed** (4) | 37,735 | 63–59 |
| 124 | August 19 | @ Astros | 3–2 | **Steve Carlton** (12–10) | Joaquín Andújar (12–9) | None | 30,631 | 64–59 |
| 125 | August 20 | Braves | 2–5 | Phil Niekro (16–16) | **Ron Reed** (9–7) | Gene Garber (20) | 35,156 | 64–60 |
| 126 | August 21 | Braves | 4–5 | Larry Bradford (1–0) | **Rawly Eastwick** (2–4) | Gene Garber (21) | 30,234 | 64–61 |
| 127 | August 22 | Braves | 3–4 | Eddie Solomon (5–10) | **Larry Christenson** (4–9) | Gene Garber (22) | 30,349 | 64–62 |
| 128 | August 24 | Astros | 5–3 | **Steve Carlton** (13–10) | Joaquín Andújar (12–10) | None | 32,124 | 65–62 |
| 129 | August 25 | Astros | 1–3 | Joe Niekro (18–7) | **Nino Espinosa** (13–10) | Joe Sambito (16) | 43,109 | 65–63 |
| 130 | August 26 | Astros | 1–4 | Pete Ladd (1–0) | **Kevin Saucier** (1–2) | Joe Sambito (17) | 32,559 | 65–64 |
| 131 | August 27 | Reds | 2–4 | Tom Hume (9–6) | **Larry Christenson** (4–10) | None | 28,421 | 65–65 |
| 132 | August 28 | Reds | 2–5 | Frank Pastore (3–6) | **Steve Carlton** (13–11) | Tom Hume (11) | 31,113 | 65–66 |
| 133 | August 29 | Reds | 6–7 | Mario Soto (2–2) | **Kevin Saucier** (1–3) | Doug Bair (16) | 30,133 | 65–67 |
| 134 | August 31 | @ Braves | 6–2 (6) | **Doug Bird** (2–0) | Tony Brizzolara (6–9) | None | 6,009 | 66–67 |

September (18–11)

| # | Date | Opponent | Score | Win | Loss | Save | Attendance | Record |
|---|---|---|---|---|---|---|---|---|
| 135 | September 1 | @ Braves | 6–4 | **Larry Christenson** (5–10) | Phil Niekro (17–18) | **Ron Reed** (5) | 16,990 | 67–67 |
| 136 | September 2 | @ Braves | 2–1 (10) | **Ron Reed** (10–7) | Joey McLaughlin (4–3) | None | 10,040 | 68–67 |
| 137 | September 3 (1) | @ Pirates | 2–0 | **Steve Carlton** (14–11) | Bert Blyleven (11–5) | **Tug McGraw** (14) | see 2nd game | 69–67 |
| 138 | September 3 (2) | @ Pirates | 3–7 | Jim Rooker (3–6) | **Randy Lerch** (7–12) | Kent Tekulve (25) | 43,444 | 69–68 |
| – | September 5 | Mets | Postponed (rain); Makeup: September 6 as a traditional double-header | | | | | |
| 139 | September 6 (1) | Mets | 3–5 | Ed Glynn (1–2) | **Nino Espinosa** (13–11) | Andy Hassler (2) | see 2nd game | 69–69 |
| 140 | September 6 (2) | Mets | 2–1 | **Randy Lerch** (8–12) | Pete Falcone (5–12) | **Rawly Eastwick** (5) | 21,091 | 70–69 |
| 141 | September 7 | @ Cubs | 3–4 | Dennis Lamp (11–8) | **Tug McGraw** (3–3) | None | 10,359 | 70–70 |
| 142 | September 8 | @ Cubs | 9–8 | **Rawly Eastwick** (3–4) | Bruce Sutter (4–5) | None | 20,767 | 71–70 |
| 143 | September 9 | @ Cubs | 2–15 | Rick Reuschel (17–9) | **Kevin Saucier** (1–4) | None | 20,922 | 71–71 |
| 144 | September 11 | @ Mets | 5–2 | **Nino Espinosa** (14–11) | Pete Falcone (5–13) | **Rawly Eastwick** (6) | 4,713 | 72–71 |
| 145 | September 12 | @ Mets | 4–0 | **Randy Lerch** (9–12) | Craig Swan (12–12) | None | 4,158 | 73–71 |
| 146 | September 13 | @ Mets | 2–1 | **Steve Carlton** (15–11) | Juan Berenguer (0–1) | **Tug McGraw** (15) | 3,890 | 74–71 |
| 147 | September 14 | Cubs | 0–2 (10) | Bruce Sutter (5–6) | **Ron Reed** (10–8) | None | 20,838 | 74–72 |
| 148 | September 15 | Cubs | 8–1 | **Dan Larson** (1–0) | Lynn McGlothen (11–13) | None | 33,042 | 75–72 |
| 149 | September 16 | Cubs | 4–3 | **Ron Reed** (11–8) | Dick Tidrow (12–5) | None | 30,261 | 76–72 |
| 150 | September 17 | @ Cardinals | 7–5 | **Steve Carlton** (16–11) | Darold Knowles (2–5) | **Tug McGraw** (16) | 6,479 | 77–72 |
| 151 | September 18 | @ Cardinals | 5–3 (10) | **Tug McGraw** (4–3) | Dan O'Brien (1–1) | None | 7,340 | 78–72 |
| 152 | September 19 (1) | Pirates | 6–9 | Kent Tekulve (10–7) | **Rawly Eastwick** (3–5) | Grant Jackson (14) | see 2nd game | 78–73 |
| 153 | September 19 (2) | Pirates | 6–5 | **Jack Kucek** (1–0) | Enrique Romo (10–5) | **Kevin Saucier** (1) | 30,566 | 79–73 |
| 154 | September 20 | Pirates | 2–1^{^{[a]}} | **Randy Lerch** (10–12) | Kent Tekulve (10–8) | None | 16,299 | 80–73 |
| – | September 21 | Expos | Postponed (rain); Makeup: September 22 as a traditional double-header | | | | | |
| 155 | September 22 (1) | Expos | 9–8 (10) | **Ron Reed** (12–8) | Dale Murray (5–10) | None | see 2nd game | 81–73 |
| 156 | September 22 (2) | Expos | 2–8 | David Palmer (10–2) | **Dickie Noles** (3–4) | None | 35,186 | 81–74 |
| 157 | September 23 | Expos | 4–7 | Bill Lee (16–10) | **Nino Espinosa** (14–12) | None | 26,507 | 81–75 |
| 158 | September 24 | Cardinals | 2–7 | Pete Vuckovich (15–10) | **Randy Lerch** (10–13) | None | 17,694 | 81–76 |
| 159 | September 25 | Cardinals | 1–4 | John Fulgham (10–6) | **Dan Larson** (1–1) | None | 16,163 | 81–77 |
| 160 | September 26 | Cardinals | 11–5 | **Steve Carlton** (17–11) | Silvio Martínez (15–8) | None | 18,458 | 82–77 |
| 161 | September 28 | @ Expos | 3–2 (11) | **Ron Reed** (13–8) | Woodie Fryman (3–6) | None | 40,303 | 83–77 |
| 162 | September 29 | @ Expos | 2–3 | Elías Sosa (8–7) | **Rawly Eastwick** (3–6) | None | 50,332 | 83–78 |
| 163 | September 30 | @ Expos | 2–0 | **Steve Carlton** (18–11) | Steve Rogers (13–12) | None | 50,824 | 84–78 |

^{^[a]}The September 20, 1979, game was protested by the Phillies in the bottom of the sixth inning. The protest was later denied.

=== Roster ===
1979 Philadelphia Phillies
**Roster**
| **Pitchers**: 43 Doug Bird; 40 Warren Brusstar; 32 Steve Carlton; 38 Larry Christenson; 49 Rawly Eastwick; 35 Nino Espinosa; 39 Jim Kaat; 34 Jack Kucek; 48 Dan Larson; 47 Randy Lerch; 41 Jim Lonborg; 45 Tug McGraw; 48 Dickie Noles; 42 Ron Reed; 44 Dick Ruthven; 33 Kevin Saucier | **Catchers**: 8 Bob Boone; 11 Tim McCarver; 34 Keith Moreland; 6 Dave Rader; **Infielders**: 16 Ramón Avilés; 10 Larry Bowa; 14,15 Bud Harrelson; 17 Pete Mackanin; 18 Rudy Meoli; 14 Pete Rose; 20 Mike Schmidt; 9 Manny Trillo; 18 John Vukovich | **Outfielders**: 22 Mike Anderson; 1 José Cardenal; 23 Greg Gross; 19 Greg Luzinski; 31 Garry Maddox; 21 Bake McBride; 26 John Poff; 27 Lonnie Smith; 25 Del Unser | **Manager**: 46 Dallas Green; 3 Danny Ozark; **Coaches**: 2 Billy DeMars; 4 Herm Starrette; 12 Tony Taylor (Hitting); 5 Bobby Tiefenauer; 7 Bobby Wine |

== Player stats ==
=== Batting ===
==== Starters by position ====
Note: Pos = Position; G = Games played; AB = At bats; H = Hits; Avg. = Batting average; HR = Home runs; RBI = Runs batted in

| Pos | Player | G | AB | H | Avg. | HR | RBI |
|---|---|---|---|---|---|---|---|
| C | Bob Boone | 119 | 398 | 114 | .286 | 9 | 58 |
| 1B | Pete Rose | 163 | 628 | 208 | .331 | 4 | 59 |
| 2B | Manny Trillo | 118 | 431 | 112 | .260 | 6 | 42 |
| SS | Larry Bowa | 147 | 539 | 130 | .241 | 0 | 31 |
| 3B | Mike Schmidt | 160 | 541 | 137 | .253 | 45 | 114 |
| LF | Greg Luzinski | 137 | 452 | 114 | .252 | 18 | 81 |
| CF | Garry Maddox | 148 | 548 | 154 | .281 | 13 | 61 |
| RF | Bake McBride | 151 | 582 | 163 | .280 | 12 | 60 |

==== Other batters ====
Note: G = Games played; AB = At bats; H = Hits; Avg. = Batting average; HR = Home runs; RBI = Runs batted in

| Player | G | AB | H | Avg. | HR | RBI |
|---|---|---|---|---|---|---|
| Greg Gross | 118 | 174 | 58 | .333 | 0 | 15 |
| Del Unser | 95 | 141 | 42 | .298 | 6 | 29 |
| Tim McCarver | 79 | 137 | 33 | .241 | 1 | 12 |
| Mike Anderson | 79 | 78 | 18 | .231 | 1 | 2 |
| Rudy Meoli | 30 | 73 | 13 | .178 | 0 | 6 |
| Bud Harrelson | 53 | 71 | 20 | .282 | 0 | 7 |
| Ramón Avilés | 27 | 61 | 17 | .279 | 0 | 12 |
| Dave Rader | 31 | 54 | 11 | .204 | 1 | 5 |
| José Cardenal | 29 | 48 | 10 | .208 | 0 | 9 |
| Keith Moreland | 14 | 48 | 18 | .375 | 0 | 8 |
| Lonnie Smith | 17 | 30 | 5 | .167 | 0 | 3 |
| John Poff | 12 | 19 | 2 | .105 | 0 | 1 |
| John Vukovich | 10 | 15 | 3 | .200 | 0 | 1 |
| Pete Mackanin | 13 | 9 | 1 | .111 | 1 | 2 |

=== Pitching ===
==== Starting pitchers ====
Note: G = Games pitched; IP = Innings pitched; W = Wins; L = Losses; ERA = Earned run average; SO = Strikeouts

| Player | G | IP | W | L | ERA | SO |
|---|---|---|---|---|---|---|
| Steve Carlton | 35 | 251.0 | 18 | 11 | 3.62 | 213 |
| Randy Lerch | 37 | 214.0 | 10 | 13 | 3.74 | 92 |
| Nino Espinosa | 33 | 212.0 | 14 | 12 | 3.65 | 88 |
| Dick Ruthven | 20 | 122.1 | 7 | 5 | 4.27 | 58 |
| Larry Christenson | 19 | 106.0 | 5 | 10 | 4.50 | 53 |
| Dickie Noles | 14 | 90.0 | 3 | 4 | 3.80 | 42 |
| Dan Larson | 3 | 19.0 | 1 | 1 | 4.26 | 9 |

==== Other pitchers ====
Note: G = Games pitched; IP = Innings pitched; W = Wins; L = Losses; ERA = Earned run average; SO = Strikeouts

| Player | G | IP | W | L | ERA | SO |
|---|---|---|---|---|---|---|
| Jim Kaat | 3 | 8.1 | 1 | 0 | 4.32 | 2 |
| Jim Lonborg | 4 | 7.1 | 0 | 1 | 11.05 | 7 |

==== Relief pitchers ====
Note: G = Games pitched; W = Wins; L = Losses; SV = Saves; ERA = Earned run average; SO = Strikeouts

| Player | G | W | L | SV | ERA | SO |
|---|---|---|---|---|---|---|
| Tug McGraw | 65 | 4 | 3 | 16 | 5.16 | 57 |
| Ron Reed | 61 | 13 | 8 | 5 | 4.15 | 58 |
| Rawly Eastwick | 51 | 3 | 6 | 6 | 4.90 | 47 |
| Doug Bird | 32 | 2 | 0 | 0 | 5.16 | 33 |
| Kevin Saucier | 29 | 1 | 4 | 1 | 4.19 | 21 |
| Warren Brusstar | 13 | 1 | 0 | 1 | 6.91 | 3 |
| Jack Kucek | 4 | 1 | 0 | 0 | 8.31 | 2 |
| Mike Anderson | 1 | 0 | 0 | 0 | 0.00 | 2 |

== Farm system ==
| Level | Team | League | Manager |
|---|---|---|---|
| AAA | Oklahoma City 89ers | American Association | Lee Elia |
| AA | Reading Phillies | Eastern League | Jim Snyder |
| A | Peninsula Pilots | Carolina League | Ron Clark |
| A | Spartanburg Phillies | Western Carolinas League | Bill Dancy |
| A-Short Season | Central Oregon Phillies | Northwest League | Tom Harmon |
| Rookie | Helena Phillies | Pioneer League | Roly de Armas |

LEAGUE CHAMPIONS: Central Oregon
