= 1979 Pittsburgh Pirates season =

Major League Baseball season

1979 Pittsburgh Pirates
- World Series champions National League champions National League East champions
- League: National League
- Division: East
- Ballpark: Three Rivers Stadium
- City: Pittsburgh, Pennsylvania
- Record: 98–64 (.605)
- Divisional place: 1st
- Owners: John W. Galbreath (majority shareholder); Thomas P. Johnson (minority shareholder)
- General managers: Harding "Pete" Peterson
- Managers: Chuck Tanner
- Television: KDKA-TV 2 (Milo Hamilton, Lanny Frattare, Nelson Briles)
- Radio: KDKA–AM 1020 (Milo Hamilton, Lanny Frattare)
- Stats: ESPN.com; Baseball Reference

The 1979 Pittsburgh Pirates had a record of 98 wins and 64 losses and captured the National League East title by two games over the Montreal Expos. The Pirates beat the Cincinnati Reds to win their ninth National League pennant, and the Baltimore Orioles to win their fifth World Series title – and also their last playoff series victory to date. The disco hit "We Are Family" by Sister Sledge was used as the team's theme song that season. This remains the last World Series victory for the Pirates; they currently hold the longest World Series drought in the National League at 47 seasons. They are second only to the Cleveland Guardians in longest World Series drought in Major League Baseball.

== Offseason ==
- October 23, 1978: Will McEnaney was released by the Pirates.
- December 4, 1978: Ken Macha was drafted from the Pirates by the Montreal Expos in the 1978 rule 5 draft.
- December 5, 1978: Odell Jones, Rafael Vásquez, and Mario Mendoza were traded by the Pirates to the Seattle Mariners for Enrique Romo, Rick Jones and Tom McMillan.

== Regular season ==
=== Key transactions ===
- April 19, 1979: Traded Frank Taveras to the New York Mets for Tim Foli and Greg Field (minors).
- June 28, 1979: Traded Fred Breining, Al Holland and Ed Whitson to the San Francisco Giants for Bill Madlock, Lenny Randle, and Dave Roberts.

=== Season standings ===
NL East
Team	W	L	Pct.	GB	Home	Road
Pittsburgh Pirates	98	64	.605	—	48‍–‍33	50‍–‍31
Montreal Expos	95	65	.594	2	56‍–‍25	39‍–‍40
St. Louis Cardinals	86	76	.531	12	42‍–‍39	44‍–‍37
Philadelphia Phillies	84	78	.519	14	43‍–‍38	41‍–‍40
Chicago Cubs	80	82	.494	18	45‍–‍36	35‍–‍46
New York Mets	63	99	.389	35	28‍–‍53	35‍–‍46

=== Record vs. opponents ===
1979 National League record Sources:
Team	ATL	CHC	CIN	HOU	LAD	MON	NYM	PHI	PIT	SD	SF	STL
Atlanta	—	4–8	6–12	7–11	12–6	1–9	4–8	7–5	4–8	6–12	11–7	4–8
Chicago	8–4	—	7–5	6–6	5–7	6–12	8–10	9–9	6–12	9–3	8–4	8–10
Cincinnati	12–6	5–7	—	8–10	11–7	6–6	8–4	8–4	8–4	10–7	6–12	8–4
Houston	11–7	6–6	10–8	—	10–8	7–5	9–3	5–7	4–8	14–4	7–11	6–6
Los Angeles	6–12	7–5	7–11	8–10	—	6–6	9–3	3–9	4–8	9–9	14–4	6–6
Montreal	9–1	12–6	6–6	5–7	6–6	—	15–3	11–7	7–11	7–5	7–5	10–8
New York	8–4	10–8	4–8	3–9	3–9	3–15	—	5–13	8–10	4–8	8–4	7–11
Philadelphia	5–7	9–9	4–8	7–5	9–3	7–11	13–5	—	8–10	9–3	6–6	7–11
Pittsburgh	8–4	12–6	4–8	8–4	8–4	11–7	10–8	10–8	—	7–5	9–3	11–7
San Diego	12–6	3–9	7–10	4–14	9–9	5–7	8–4	3–9	5–7	—	8–10	4–8
San Francisco	7–11	4–8	12–6	11–7	4–14	5–7	4–8	6–6	3–9	10–8	—	5–7
St. Louis	8–4	10–8	4–8	6–6	6–6	8–10	11–7	11–7	7–11	8–4	7–5	—

== Roster ==
1979 Pittsburgh Pirates
Roster
Pitchers: 26 Jim Bibby; 22 Bert Blyleven; 45 John Candelaria; 41 Joe Coleman; 17 Dock Ellis; 23 Grant Jackson; 25 Bruce Kison; 44 Rick Rhoden; 49 Dave Roberts; 43 Don Robinson; 15 Enrique Romo; 19 Jim Rooker; 27 Kent Tekulve; 31 Ed Whitson	Catchers: 16 Steve Nicosia; 14 Ed Ott; 35 Manny Sanguillén; Infielders: 4 Dale Berra; 10 Tim Foli; 3 Phil Garner; 5 Bill Madlock; 8 Willie Stargell; 6 Rennie Stennett; 10 Frank Taveras	Outfielders: 36 Matt Alexander; 24 Mike Easler; 17 Lee Lacy; 34 John Milner; 18 Omar Moreno; 39 Dave Parker; 28 Bill Robinson; Other batters: 44 Doe Boyland; 2 Gary Hargis; 37 Alberto Lois	Manager: 7 Chuck Tanner; Coaches: 57,31 Harvey Haddix (Pitching); 32 Joe Lonnett (Third base); 42 Al Monchak (First base); 48 Bob Skinner (Hitting)

=== Opening Day Lineup ===
Opening Day Starters
#	Name	Position
10	Frank Taveras	SS
18	Omar Moreno	CF
39	Dave Parker	RF
8	Willie Stargell	1B
28	Bill Robinson	LF
6	Rennie Stennett	2B
14	Ed Ott	C
3	Phil Garner	3B
22	Bert Blyleven	P

== Game log ==
=== Regular season ===
Legend
	Pirates win
	Pirates loss
	Postponement
	Clinched division
**Bold**	Pirates team member

1979 regular season game log: 98–64 (Home: 48–33; Away: 50–31)
April: 7–11 (Home: 5–6; Away: 2–5)

#	Date	Time (ET)	Opponent	Score	Win	Loss	Save	Time of Game	Attendance	Record	Box/ Streak
1	April 6	12:35 p.m. EST	Expos	2–3 (10)	Sosa (1–0)	**Tekulve** (0–1)	—	3:02	36,141	0–1	L1
2	April 7	2:15 p.m. EST	Expos	7–6	**Jackson** (1–0)	Sosa (1–1)	—	3:00	8,700	1–1	W1
3	April 8	1:05 p.m. EST	Expos	4–5	May (1–0)	**Romo** (0–1)	Palmer (1)	3:03	8,680	1–2	L1
4	April 10		@ Phillies	3–7	Ruthven	**Romo** (0–2)	—		48,235	1–3	L2
5	April 11		@ Phillies	4–5	Carlton	**Blyleven** (0–1)	—		26,281	1–4	L3
6	April 12		Cardinals	3–1	**Robinson** (1–0)	Denny	—		3,986	2–4	W1
7	April 13		Cardinals	7–6	**Bibby** (1–0)	Schultz	**Jackson** (1)		4,395	3–4	W2
8	April 14		Cardinals	7–4	**Whitson** (1–0)	Forsch	**Jackson** (2)		10,940	4–4	W3
9	April 15		Cardinals	4–9 (10)	Littell	**Tekulve** (0–2)	—		3,012	4–5	L1
10	April 17		Phillies	2–13	Carlton	**Blyleven** (0–2)	—		7,739	4–6	L2
11	April 18		Phillies	2–3	Lerch	**Robinson** (1–1)	—		12,195	4–7	L3
12	April 20	8:35 p.m. EST	@ Astros	4–5 (10)	Sambito (1–0)	**Bibby** (1–1)	—	3:16	19,834	4–8	L4
13	April 21	8:35 p.m. EST	@ Astros	4–5 (10)	Andújar (2–0)	**Tekulve** (0–3)	—	3:23	48,977	4–9	L5
14	April 22	3:05 p.m. EST	@ Astros	2–3	Andújar (3–0)	**Candelaria** (0–1)	Sambito (2)	2:27	22,403	4–10	W1
15	April 24	8:05 p.m. EST	@ Reds	9–2	**Robinson** (2–1)	Pastore (0–2)	—	2:30	18,372	5–10	W2
16	April 25	12:35 p.m. EST	@ Reds	3–2 (11)	**Tekulve** (1–3)	Tomlin (0–1)	—	3:05	20,155	6–10	W3
17	April 27	7:35 p.m. EST	Astros	8–9 (11)	Riccelli (1–0)	**Whitson** (1–1)	—	3:30	5,767	6–11	L1
—	April 28		Astros	**Postponed (Rain)** (Makeup date: July 19)							
18	April 29	1:05 p.m. EDT	Astros	10–5	**Kison** (1–0)	Niekro (1–2)	**Jackson** (3)	3:07	7,598	7–11	W1

May: 16–10 (Home: 7–4; Away: 9–6)

#	Date	Time (ET)	Opponent	Score	Win	Loss	Save	Time of Game	Attendance	Record	Box/ Streak
19	May 1	7:35 p.m. EDT	Braves	2–5	Niekro (3–4)	**Tekulve** (1–4)</span	—	2:37	5,122	7–12	L1
20	May 2	7:35 p.m. EDT	Braves	10–2	**Candelaria** (1–1)	M. Mahler (0–2)	—	2:21	4,840	8–12	W1
—	May 3		Braves	**Postponed (Rain)** (Makeup date: July 23)							
21	May 4		@ Cardinals	3–4	Sykes	**Robinson** (2–2)	Schultz		13,525	8–13	L1
22	May 5		@ Cardinals	6–5	**Jackson** (2–0)	Vuckovich	**Whitson** (1)		17,440	9–13	W1
23	May 6		@ Cardinals	2–4	Martinez	**Kison** (1–1)	Knowles		20,966	9–14	L1
24	May 7	7:35 p.m. EDT	@ Braves	4–2	**Candelaria** (2–1)	M. Mahler (0–3)	**Tekulve** (1)	2:54	8,166	10–14	W1
25	May 8	7:35 p.m. EDT	@ Braves	1–4	Solomon (2–1)	**Rhoden** (0–1)	—	2:57	5,741	10–15	L1
26	May 9	7:43 p.m. EDT	@ Braves	17–9	**Bibby** (2–1)	Garber (1–5)	**Tekulve** (2)	3:42	6,855	11–15	W1
27	May 11	7:35 p.m. EDT	Reds	4–8	Tomlin (1–1)	**Whitson** (1–2)	Bair (6)	2:48	14,115	11–16	L1
28	May 12	2:15 p.m. EDT	Reds	3–2	**Bibby** (3–1)	Pastore (1–3)	**Jackson** (4)	2:55	18,745	12–16	W1
29	May 13	1:05 p.m. EDT	Reds	3–7	LaCoss (4–0)	**Candelaria** (2–2)	—	2:46	10,253	12–17	L1
30	May 15		Mets	0–3	Swan	**Robinson** (2–3)	Lockwood		6,097	12–18	L2
31	May 16		Mets	4–3 (13)	**Romo** (1–2)	Lockwood	—		7,621	13–18	W1
32	May 17		Mets	6–5	**Tekulve** (2–4)	Orosco	—		6,295	14–18	W2
33	May 18		@ Cubs	9–5	**Candelaria** (3–2)	Holtzman	—		12,578	15–18	W3
34	May 19		@ Cubs	3–0	**Rooker** (1–0)	Krukow	**Jackson** (5)		29,460	16–18	W4
35	May 20		@ Cubs	6–5	**Robinson** (3–3)	McGlothen	**Tekulve** (3)		30,998	17–18	W5
36	May 21	1:35 p.m. EDT	@ Expos	4–2	**Blyleven** (1–2)	Sanderson (2–3)	**Tekulve** (4)	2:58	25,154	18–18	W6
37	May 22	1:35 p.m. EDT	@ Expos	3–6	Grimsley (4–2)	**Whitson** (1–3)	Fryman (2)	2:42	15,227	18–19	L1
38	May 23	7:35 p.m. EDT	@ Expos	0–3	Rogers (4–2)	**Candelaria** (3–3)	—	2:18	7,041	18–20	L2
39	May 25		@ Mets	3–3 (11)			—		6,611	18–20	
40	May 26		@ Mets	8–10	Lockwood	**Tekulve** (2–5)	—		20,272	18–21	L3
41	May 27		@ Mets	2–1	**Jackson** (3–0)	Murray	—		25,545	19–21	W1
42	May 28		@ Mets	6–1	**Candelaria** (4–3)	Falcone	**Jackson** (6)		10,619	20–21	W2
43	May 29		Cubs	8–0	**Robinson** (4–3)	Holtzman	—		7,196	21–21	W3
44	May 30		Cubs	9–2	**Rooker** (2–0)	McGlothen	—		7,107	22–21	W4
45	May 31		Cubs	4–3 (10)	**Kison** (2–1)	Sutter	—		6,438	23–21	W5

June: 14–13 (Home: 7–9; Away: 7–4)

#	Date	Time (ET)	Opponent	Score	Win	Loss	Save	Time of Game	Attendance	Record	Box/ Streak
46	June 1		Padres	9–8	**Tekulve** (3–5)	Shirley	—		12,928	24–21	W6
47	June 2		Padres	1–3	Perry	**Candelaria** (4–4)	—		20,977	24–22	L1
48	June 3		Padres	7–0	**Kison** (3–1)	Owchinko	—		13,370	25–22	W1
49	June 4		Dodgers	2–4	Sutcliffe	**Rooker** (2–1)	—		14,727	25–23	L1
50	June 5		Dodgers	3–1	**Blyleven** (2–2)	Sutton	**Tekulve** (5)		11,088	26–23	W1
51	June 6		Dodgers	5–4	**Romo** (2–2)	Welch	**Tekulve** (6)		16,666	27–23	W2
52	June 8		Giants	3–2	**Romo** (3–2)	Curtis	**Jackson** (7)		18,227	28–23	W3
53	June 9		Giants	2–6	Blue	**Kison** (3–2)	—		25,814	28–24	L1
54	June 10		Giants	4–7	Lavelle	**Romo** (3–3)	—		25,536	28–25	L2
55	June 12		@ Padres	3–6	Perry	**Candelaria** (4–5)	—		23,759	28–26	L3
56	June 13		@ Padres	2–3	Owchinko	**Kison** (3–3)	Fingers		17,845	28–27	L4
57	June 14		@ Padres	1–2 (14)	D'Acquisto	**Candelaria** (4–6)	—		15,444	28–28	L5
58	June 15		@ Dodgers	6–2	**Blyleven** (3–2)	Sutton	**Tekulve** (7)		50,299	29–28	W1
59	June 16		@ Dodgers	6–3	**Robinson** (5–3)	Welch	—		49,448	30–28	W2
60	June 17		@ Dodgers	5–1	**Whitson** (2–3)	Reuss	**Tekulve** (8)		45,835	31–28	W3
61	June 19		@ Giants	9–4	**Candelaria** (5–6)	Montefusco	**Romo** (1)		39,861	32–28	W4
62	June 20		@ Giants	8–5	**Jackson** (4–0)	Lavelle	**Tekulve** (9)		19,637	33–28	W5
63	June 22		Cubs	7–2	**Blyleven** (4–2)	Holtzman	—		21,006	34–28	W6
64	June 23		Cubs	3–4	Krukow	**Robinson** (5–4)	Sutter		18,513	34–29	L1
65	June 24		Cubs	0–5	Reuschel	**Kison** (3–4)	—		43,402	34–30	L2
66	June 25		@ Mets	8–1	**Candelaria** (6–6)	Swan		—		35–30	W1
67	June 25		@ Mets	0–4	Falcone	**Rooker** (2–2)	—		14,666	35–31	L1
68	June 26		@ Mets	2–1	**Blyleven** (5–2)	Hausman	**Jackson** (8)		11,903	36–31	W1
69	June 27		Mets	9–12	Twitchell	**Jackson** (4–1)	—		13,168	36–32	L1
70	June 28		Mets	2–3	Allen	**Bibby** (3–2)	Glynn		10,137	36–33	L2
71	June 29	7:35 p.m. EDT	Expos	6–5	**Kison** (4–4)	Lee (7–5)	**Tekulve** (10)	2:45	35,677	37–33	W1
72	June 30	2:15 p.m. EDT	Expos	3–5	Sanderson (5–4)	**Blyleven** (5–3)	Fryman (5)	2:38	13,865	37–34	L1

July: 20–11 (Home: 8–5; Away: 12–6)

#	Date	Time (ET)	Opponent	Score	Win	Loss	Save	Time of Game	Attendance	Record	Box/ Streak
—	July 1 (1)		Expos	**Postponed (Rain)** (Makeup date: September 24)							
—	July 1 (2)		Expos	**Postponed (Rain)** (Makeup date: September 24)							
73	July 2		@ Cardinals	5–4	**Romo** (4–3)	Knowles	**Jackson** (9)		18,042	38–34	W1
74	July 3		@ Cardinals	4–1	**Candelaria** (7–6)	Forsch	**Romo** (2)		17,130	39–34	W2
75	July 4		@ Cardinals	6–4	**Blyleven** (6–3)	Vuckovich	**Jackson** (10)		14,766	40–34	W3
76	July 5		@ Cardinals	0–2	Fulgham	**Rooker** (2–3)	—		16,626	40–35	L1
77	July 6	8:05 p.m. EDT	@ Reds	1–2	Bair (5–4)	**Jackson** (4–2)	—	2:20	32,264	40–36	L2
78	July 7	5:35 p.m. EDT	@ Reds	2–6	Moskau (5–3)	**Robinson** (5–5)	—	2:55	36,300	40–37	L3
79	July 8 (1)	1:05 p.m. EDT	@ Reds	2–4	Norman (5–7)	**Candelaria** (7–7)	—	2:04	—	40–38	L4
80	July 8 (2)	4:00 p.m. EDT	@ Reds	2–1	**Jackson** (5–2)	Tomlin (2–2)	**Tekulve** (11)	2:15	43,099	41–38	W1
81	July 10	8:35 p.m. EDT	@ Astros	4–3	**Bibby** (4–2)	Andújar (10–5)	**Tekulve** (12)	3:09	31,341	42–38	W2
82	July 11	8:35 p.m. EDT	@ Astros	5–1	**Kison** (5–4)	Richard (7–9)	—	2:10	25,330	43–38	W3
83	July 12	8:35 p.m. EDT	@ Astros	5–3	**Blyleven** (7–3)	Niekro (13–4)	**Tekulve** (13)	2:44	22,956	44–38	W4
84	July 13	7:39 p.m. EDT	@ Braves	4–13	Niekro (12–11)	**Rooker** (2–4)	—	2:16	17,018	44–39	L1
85	July 14	7:39 p.m. EDT	@ Braves	5–1	**Candelaria** (8–7)	Matula (6–6)	—	2:13	25,083	45–39	W1
86	July 15	7:00 p.m. EDT	@ Braves	7–3	**Bibby** (5–2)	Solomon (2–1)	—	2:45	11,304	46–39	W2
**50th All-Star Game in Seattle, Washington**
87	July 19 (1)	6:05 p.m. EDT	Astros	9–5	**Roberts** (1–0)	Forsch (5–6)	—	2:41	—	47–39	W3
88	July 19 (2)	9:21 p.m. EDT	Astros	4–2	**Kison** (6–4)	Niekro (13–5)	**Jackson** (11)	2:12	33,464	48–39	W4
89	July 20	7:35 p.m. EDT	Astros	9–3	**Candelaria** (9–7)	Richard (7–11)	—	2:40	23,585	49–39	W5
90	July 21	2:15 p.m. EDT	Astros	6–5	**Romo** (5–3)	Sambito (4–3)	**Tekulve** (14)	3:00	19,570	50–39	W6
91	July 22 (1)	1:35 p.m. EDT	Braves	5–4	**D. Robinson** (6–5)	Solomon (4–7)	**Tekulve** (15)	2:24	—	51–39	W7
92	July 22 (2)	7:55 p.m. EDT	Braves	3–2	**Bibby** (6–2)	M. Mahler (2–9)	**Tekulve** (16)	2:44	29,533	52–39	W8
93	July 23 (1)	6:05 p.m. EDT	Braves	7–1	**Blyleven** (8–3)	Hanna (0–1)	—	2:30	—	53–39	W9
94	July 23 (2)	9:12 p.m. EDT	Braves	0–8	Niekro (14–11)	**Rooker** (2–5)	—	2:13	27,148	53–40	L1
95	July 24	7:35 p.m. EDT	Reds	5–6	Norman (7–8)	**Kison** (6–5)	Bair (14)	3:16	19,517	53–41	L2
96	July 25	7:35 p.m. EDT	Reds	5–6 (10)	Bair (6–5)	**Tekulve** (3–6)	—	2:55	17,296	53–42	L3
97	July 26	7:35 p.m. EDT	Reds	7–9	Soto (1–2)	**Roberts** (1–1)	Hume (3)	2:51	20,339	53–43	L4
98	July 27 (1)	6:05 p.m. EDT	@ Expos	5–4	**Tekulve** (4–6)	Sosa (5–6)	**Romo** (3)	2:48	—	54–43	W1
99	July 27 (2)	9:28 p.m. EDT	@ Expos	9–1	**Blyleven** (9–3)	Sanderson (6–6)	—	2:46	59,260	55–43	W2
100	July 28	7:35 p.m. EDT	@ Expos	5–3	**Bibby** (7–2)	Schatzeder (5–4)	**Tekulve** (17)	2:33	38,661	56–43	W3
101	July 29	1:35 p.m. EDT	@ Expos	3–5	Rogers (10–6)	**Kison** (6–6)	—	2:22	35,245	56–44	L1
102	July 30		Mets	8–5	**Jackson** (6–2)	Bernard	**Tekulve** (18)		11,837	57–44	W1
103	July 31		Mets	1–2	Twitchell	**Blyleven** (9–4)	Glynn		10,739	57–45	L1

August: 21–9 (Home: 12–4; Away: 9–5)

#	Date	Time (ET)	Opponent	Score	Win	Loss	Save	Time of Game	Attendance	Record	Box/ Streak
104	August 1		Cardinals	4–3	**Romo** (6–3)	Forsch	**Tekulve** (19)		16,124	58–45	W1
105	August 2		Cardinals	4–5	Frazier	**Jackson** (6–3)	Knowles		25,163	58–46	L1
106	August 3		Phillies	6–3	**Romo** (7–3)	McGraw	—			59–46	W1
107	August 3		Phillies	5–1	**Bibby** (8–2)	Christenson	—		45,309	60–46	W2
108	August 4		Phillies	4–0	**Candelaria** (10–7)	Espinosa	—		34,754	61–46	W3
109	August 5		Phillies	12–8	**Tekulve** (5–6)	Eastwick	—			62–46	W4
110	August 5		Phillies	5–2	**Romo** (8–3)	Noles	**Tekulve** (20)		46,006	63–46	W5
111	August 7		@ Cubs	2–15	Reuschel	**Rooker** (2–6)	—		34,641	63–47	L1
112	August 8		@ Cubs	5–2 (10)	**Tekulve** (6–6)	Tidrow	—		34,255	64–47	W1
113	August 9		@ Cubs	3–11	Lamp	**Candelaria** (10–8)	—		29,645	64–48	L1
114	August 10		@ Phillies	3–4 (12)	Eastwick	**Jackson** (6–4)		—		64–49	L2
115	August 10		@ Phillies	3–2	**Kison** (7–6)	Lerch	**Tekulve** (21)		63,346	65–49	W1
116	August 11		@ Phillies	14–11	**Romo** (9–3)	Eastwick	**Tekulve** (22)		51,118	66–49	W2
117	August 13		@ Phillies	9–1	**Bibby** (9–2)	Christenson	—		43,111	67–49	W3
118	August 14		Padres	7–1	**Candelaria** (11–8)	D'Acquisto	—		23,210	68–49	W4
119	August 15		Padres	5–1	**Blyleven** (10–4)	Jones	—		14,219	69–49	W5
120	August 16		Padres	5–4	**Kison** (8–6)	Perry	**Romo** (4)		14,201	70–49	W6
121	August 17		Dodgers	6–7	Patterson	**Bibby** (9–3)	Castillo		22,416	70–50	L1
122	August 18		Dodgers	1–5	Reuss	**Robinson** (6–6)	—		40,238	70–51	L2
123	August 19		Dodgers	2–0	**Tekulve** (7–6)	Hooton	—		28,382	71–51	W1
124	August 20		Giants	6–5	**Romo** (10–3)	Lavelle	**Tekulve** (23)		18,714	72–51	W2
125	August 21		Giants	1–6	Knepper	**Kison** (8–7)	—		20,999	72–52	L1
126	August 22		Giants	8–6	**Tekulve** (8–6)	Lavelle	—		19,768	73–52	W1
127	August 24		@ Padres	2–3	Jones	**Romo** (10–4)	Lee		16,890	73–53	L1
128	August 25		@ Padres	4–3 (19)	**Roberts** (2–1)	D'Acquisto	—		14,607	74–53	W1
129	August 26		@ Padres	9–2	**Kison** (9–7)	Shirley	—		13,006	75–53	W2
130	August 27		@ Dodgers	2–4	Brett	**Tekulve** (8–7)	—		35,705	75–54	L1
131	August 28		@ Dodgers	4–1	**Candelaria** (12–8)	Hough	—		31,587	76–54	W1
132	August 29		@ Dodgers	4–1	**Blyleven** (11–4)	Reuss	**Tekulve** (24)		32,816	77–54	W2
133	August 31		@ Giants	6–4	**Robinson** (7–6)	Curtis	**Jackson** (12)		19,377	78–54	W3

September: 20–10 (Home: 9–5; Away: 11–5)

#	Date	Time (ET)	Opponent	Score	Win	Loss	Save	Time of Game	Attendance	Record	Box/ Streak
134	September 1		@ Giants	5–3	**Kison** (10–7)	Montefusco	**Jackson** (13)		25,551	79–54	W4
135	September 1		@ Giants	7–2	**Bibby** (10–3)	Knepper	—		27,382	80–54	W5
136	September 2		@ Giants	5–3	**Candelaria** (13–8)	Blue	—		15,663	81–54	W6
137	September 3		Phillies	0–2	Carlton	**Blyleven** (11–5)	McGraw			81–55	L1
138	September 3		Phillies	7–3	**Rooker** (3–6)	Lerch	**Tekulve** (25)		43,444	82–55	W1
139	September 5		@ Cardinals	7–5 (11)	**Roberts** (3–1)	Thomas	**Tekulve** (26)		23,059	83–55	W2
140	September 6		@ Cardinals	6–8	Martinez	**Bibby** (10–4)	McEnaney		14,767	83–56	L1
141	September 7		@ Mets	6–4 (14)	**Jackson** (7–4)	Allen	—		8,290	84–56	W1
142	September 8		@ Mets	2–3 (15)	Ellis	**Rooker** (3–7)	—		8,095	84–57	L1
143	September 9		@ Mets	6–5	**Tekulve** (9–7)	Glynn	—		9,093	85–57	W1
144	September 11		Cardinals	7–3	**Roberts** (4–1)	Denny	—		15,757	86–57	W2
145	September 12		Cardinals	2–0	**Candelaria** (14–8)	Forsch	**Tekulve** (27)		17,669	87–57	W3
—	September 13		Cardinals	**Postponed (Rain)** (Makeup date: September 27)							
146	September 15		Mets	5–4	**Roberts** (5–1)	Glynn	**Tekulve** (28)		18,060	88–57	W4
147	September 16		Mets	0–3	Falcone	**Candelaria** (14–9)	Allen		25,364	88–58	L1
148	September 17	7:35 p.m. EDT	@ Expos	2–1	**Robinson** (8–6)	Rogers (13–10)	—	2:28	54,609	89–58	W1
149	September 18	7:35 p.m. EDT	@ Expos	5–3 (11)	**Jackson** (8–4)	Murray (4–9)	**Roberts** (1)	3:04	56,976	90–58	W2
150	September 19		@ Phillies	9–6	**Tekulve** (10–7)	Eastwick	**Jackson** (14)			91–58	W3
151	September 19		@ Phillies	5–6	Kucek	**Romo** (10–5)	Saucier		30,566	91–59	L1
152	September 20		@ Phillies	1–2	Lerch	**Tekulve** (10–8)	—		16,299	91–60	L2
153	September 21		@ Cubs	0–2	McGlothen	**Robinson** (8–7)	—		9,552	91–61	L3
154	September 22		@ Cubs	4–1	**Kison** (11–7)	Riley	**Tekulve** (29)		24,657	92–61	W1
155	September 23		@ Cubs	6–0	**Bibby** (11–4)	Reuschel	—		24,571	93–61	W2
156	September 24 (1)	6:05 p.m. EDT	Expos	5–2	**Blyleven** (12–5)	Schatzeder (10–5)	**Tekulve** (30)	2:30	—	94–61	W3
157	September 24 (2)	9:10 p.m. EDT	Expos	6–7	Grimsley (10–9)	**Jackson** (8–5)	Sosa (18)	3:28	47,268	94–62	L1
158	September 25	7:35 p.m. EDT	Expos	10–4	**Rooker** (4–7)	Sanderson (9–8)	**Romo** (5)	3:06	31,348	95–62	W1
159	September 26	7:35 p.m. EDT	Expos	10–1	**Kison** (12–7)	Rogers (13–11)	—	3:00	42,043	96–62	W2
160	September 27		Cardinals	5–9	Forsch	**Roberts** (5–2)	Littell		11,172	96–63	L1
161	September 28		Cubs	6–1	**Bibby** (12–4)	Reuschel	—		14,778	97–63	W1
162	September 29		Cubs	6–7 (13)	Caudill	**Robinson** (8–8)	—		25,734	97–64	L1
163	September 30		Cubs	5–3	**Kison** (13–7)	McGlothen	**Tekulve** (31)		42,176	98–64	W1

=== Detailed records ===
National League
Opponent	W	L	WP	RS	RA
NL East
Chicago Cubs	12	6	0.667	86	68
Montreal Expos	11	7	0.611	89	66
New York Mets	10	8	0.556	78	73
Philadelphia Phillies	10	8	0.556	94	79
**Pittsburgh Pirates**					
St. Louis Cardinals	11	7	0.611	82	77
Div Total	54	36	0.600	429	363
NL West
Atlanta Braves	8	4	0.667	65	54
Cincinnati Reds	4	8	0.333	46	55
Houston Astros	8	4	0.667	70	49
Los Angeles Dodgers	8	4	0.667	46	33
San Diego Padres	7	5	0.583	55	36
San Francisco Giants	9	3	0.750	64	53
Div Total	44	28	0.611	346	280
Season Total	98	64	0.605	775	643

Month	Games	Won	Lost	Win %	RS	RA
April	18	7	11	0.389	85	93
May	27	16	10	0.615	130	104
June	27	14	13	0.519	116	10327
July	31	20	11	0.645	143	119
August	30	21	9	0.700	151	121
September	30	20	20	0.667	150	103
Total	163	98	64	0.605	775	643

	Games	Won	Lost	Win %	RS	RA
Home	81	48	33	0.593	399	339
Away	82	50	31	0.617	376	304
Total	163	98	64	0.605	775	643

=== Composite Box ===
1979 Pittsburgh Pirates Inning–by–Inning Boxscore
Team	1	2	3	4	5	6	7	8	9	10	11	12	13	14	15	16	17	18	19	R	H	E
Opponents	81	77	81	69	56	82	67	67	48	9	1	2	1	1	1	0	0	0	0	643	1424	142
Pirates	104	73	87	71	99	67	86	98	76	4	5	1	1	2	0	0	0	0	1	775	1541	134

=== Postseason Game log ===
Legend
	Pirates win
	Pirates loss
	Postponement
**Bold**	Pirates team member

1979 Postseason game log: 7–3 (Home: 2–2; Away: 5–1)
NL Championship Series: vs. Cincinnati Reds 3–0 (Home: 1–0; Away: 2–0)

#	Date	Time (ET)	Opponent	Score	Win	Loss	Save	Time of Game	Attendance	Series	Box/ Streak
1	October 2	8:30 p.m. EDT	@ Reds	5–2 (11)	**Jackson** (1–0)	Hume (0–1)	**Robinson** (1)	3:14	55,006	PIT 1–0	W1
2	October 3	3:15 p.m. EDT	@ Reds	3–2 (10)	**Robinson** (1–0)	Bair (0–1)	—	3:24	55,000	PIT 2–0	W2
3	October 5	3:15 p.m. EDT	Reds	7–1	**Blyleven** (1–0)	LaCoss (0–1)	—	2:45	42,240	PIT 3–0	W3

World Series: vs. Baltimore Orioles 4–3 (Home: 1–2; Away: 3–1)

#	Date	Time (ET)	Opponent	Score	Win	Loss	Save	Time of Game	Attendance	Series	Box/ Streak
—	October 9		@ Orioles	**Postponed (Rain)** (Makeup date: October 10)						Tied 0–0	
1	October 10	8:30 p.m. EDT	@ Orioles	4–5	Flanagan (2–0)	**Kison** (0–1)	—	3:18	53,735	BAL 1–0	L1
2	October 11	8:30 p.m. EDT	@ Orioles	3–2	**Robinson** (2–0)	Stanhouse (1–2)	**Tekulve** (1)	3:13	53,739	Tied 1–1	W1
3	October 12	8:30 p.m. EDT	Orioles	4–8	McGregor (2–0)	**Candelaria** (0–1)	—	2:51	50,848	BAL 2–1	L1
4	October 13	1:00 p.m. EDT	Orioles	6–9	Stoddard (1–0)	**Tekulve** (0–1)	—	3:48	50,883	BAL 3–1	L2
5	October 14	4:30 p.m. EDT	Orioles	7–1	**Blyleven** (2–0)	Flanagan (2–1)	—	2:54	50,920	BAL 3–2	W1
6	October 16	8:30 p.m. EDT	@ Orioles	4–0	**Candelaria** (1–1)	Palmer (0–1)	**Tekulve** (2)	2:30	53,739	Tied 3–3	W2
7	October 17	8:30 p.m. EDT	@ Orioles	4–1	**Jackson** (2–0)	McGregor (2–1)	**Tekulve** (3)	2:54	53,733	PIT 4–3	W3

== Player stats ==
Batting

Note: G = Games played; AB = At bats; H = Hits; Avg. = Batting average; HR = Home runs; RBI = Runs batted in

Regular season
Player	G	AB	H	Avg.	HR	RBI
R. Rhoden	1	1	1	1.000	0	0
M. Alexander	44	13	7	0.538	0	1
B. Madlock	85	311	102	0.328	7	44
D. Parker	158	622	193	0.310	25	94
P. Garner	150	549	161	0.293	11	59
T. Foli	133	525	153	0.291	1	65
S. Nicosia	70	191	55	0.288	4	13
O. Moreno	162	695	196	0.282	8	69
W. Stargell	126	424	119	0.281	32	82
M. Easler	55	54	15	0.278	2	11
J. Milner	128	326	90	0.276	16	60
E. Ott	117	403	110	0.273	7	51
B. Robinson	148	421	111	0.264	24	75
L. Lacy	84	182	45	0.247	5	15
F. Taveras	11	45	11	0.244	0	1
R. Stennett	108	319	76	0.238	0	24
M. Sanguillén	56	74	17	0.230	0	4
D. Berra	44	123	26	0.211	3	15
D. Robinson	29	49	10	0.204	0	3
J. Coleman	10	5	1	0.200	0	0
J. Bibby	34	45	8	0.178	2	5
E. Romo	84	12	2	0.167	0	1
B. Kison	37	55	8	0.145	1	6
K. Tekulve	94	15	2	0.133	0	1
J. Candelaria	33	68	9	0.132	0	6
B. Blyleven	38	70	9	0.129	0	3
J. Rooker	19	33	4	0.121	0	0
D. Boyland	4	3	0	0.000	0	0
D. Ellis	3	1	0	0.000	0	0
G. Jackson	72	9	0	0.000	0	1
D. Roberts	21	5	0	0.000	0	1
E. Whitson	19	13	0	0.000	0	0
G. Hargis	1	0	0	—	0	0
A. Lois	11	0	0	—	0	0
Team totals	163	5,661	1,541	0.272	148	710

Postseason
Player	G	AB	H	Avg.	HR	RBI
R. Stennett	2	1	1	1.000	0	0
P. Garner	10	36	17	0.472	1	6
W. Stargell	10	41	17	0.415	5	13
D. Parker	10	41	14	0.341	0	6
B. Madlock	10	36	12	0.333	1	5
M. Sanguillén	3	3	1	0.333	0	1
T. Foli	10	42	14	0.333	0	6
O. Moreno	10	45	14	0.311	0	3
E. Ott	6	25	7	0.280	0	3
L. Lacy	4	4	1	0.250	0	0
B. Robinson	10	22	5	0.227	0	2
B. Blyleven	3	6	1	0.167	0	0
J. Candelaria	3	6	1	0.167	0	0
J. Milner	6	18	3	0.167	0	1
S. Nicosia	4	16	1	0.063	0	0
E. Romo	4	1	0	0.000	0	0
G. Jackson	6	2	0	0.000	0	0
J. Bibby	3	4	0	0.000	0	0
J. Rooker	2	2	0	0.000	0	0
K. Tekulve	7	3	0	0.000	0	0
M. Easler	3	2	0	0.000	0	0
B. Kison	1	0	0	—	0	0
D. Roberts	1	0	0	—	0	0
D. Robinson	6	0	0	—	0	0
M. Alexander	2	0	0	—	0	0
Team totals	10	356	109	0.306	7	46

Pitching

Note: G = Games pitched; IP = Innings pitched; W = Wins; L = Losses; ERA = Earned run average; SO = Strikeouts

Regular season
Player	G	IP	W	L	ERA	SO
D. Ellis	3	7	0	0	2.57	1
K. Tekulve	94	134 1/3	10	8	2.75	75
J. Bibby	34	137 2/3	12	4	2.81	103
G. Jackson	72	82	8	5	2.96	39
E. Romo	84	129 1/3	10	5	2.99	106
B. Kison	33	172 1/3	13	7	3.19	105
J. Candelaria	33	207	14	9	3.22	101
D. Roberts	21	38 2/3	5	2	3.26	15
B. Blyleven	37	237 1/3	12	5	3.60	172
D. Robinson	29	160 2/3	8	8	3.87	96
E. Whitson	19	57 2/3	2	3	4.37	31
J. Rooker	19	103 2/3	4	7	4.60	44
J. Coleman	10	20 2/3	0	0	6.10	14
R. Rhoden	1	5	0	1	7.20	2
Team totals	163	1,493 1/3	98	64	3.41	904

Postseason
Player	G	IP	W	L	ERA	SO
G. Jackson	6	6 2/3	2	0	0.00	4
J. Rooker	2	8 2/3	0	0	1.04	4
B. Blyleven	3	19	2	0	1.42	13
J. Bibby	3	17 1/3	0	0	2.08	15
K. Tekulve	7	12	0	1	3.00	12
E. Romo	4	5	0	0	3.60	5
D. Robinson	6	7	2	0	3.86	6
J. Candelaria	3	16	1	1	3.94	8
B. Kison	1	1/3	0	1	108.00	0
D. Roberts	1	0	0	0	—	0
Team totals	10	92	7	3	2.74	67

== Postseason ==
=== National League Championship Series ===
==== Game 1 ====
October 2, Riverfront Stadium

Team	1	2	3	4	5	6	7	8	9	10	11	R	H	E
Pittsburgh	0	0	2	0	0	0	0	0	0	0	3	5	10	0
Cincinnati	0	0	0	2	0	0	0	0	0	0	0	2	7	0
W: Grant Jackson (1-0) L: Tom Hume (0-1) SV: Don Robinson (1)
HRs: PIT – Phil Garner (1) Willie Stargell (1) CIN – George Foster (1)

==== Game 2 ====
October 3, Riverfront Stadium

Team	1	2	3	4	5	6	7	8	9	10	R	H	E
Pittsburgh	0	0	0	1	1	0	0	0	0	1	3	11	0
Cincinnati	0	1	0	0	0	0	0	0	1	0	2	8	0
W: Don Robinson (1-0) L: Doug Bair (0-1) SV: None
HRs: PIT – None CIN – None

==== Game 3 ====
October 5, Three Rivers Stadium

Team	1	2	3	4	5	6	7	8	9	R	H	E
Cincinnati	0	0	0	0	0	1	0	0	0	1	8	1
Pittsburgh	1	1	2	2	0	0	0	1	X	7	7	0
W: Bert Blyleven (1-0) L: Mike LaCoss (0-1) SV: None
HRs: CIN – Johnny Bench (1) PIT – Willie Stargell (2) Bill Madlock (1)

=== World Series ===
The Pirates became one of only six teams in the 20th century to have won a World Series after trailing three games to one. Two of those teams were the Pirates, in 1925 and 1979. The others were the 1903 Boston Red Sox (in a best-of-nine series), 1958 New York Yankees, 1968 Detroit Tigers, and 1985 Kansas City Royals. Five Pirates had 10 or more hits in this series, a World Series record.

Chuck Tanner's mother died the morning of Game 5 and 1960 World Series hero Bill Mazeroski threw out the first ball in Game 5. The Pirates were the last team in the 20th Century to win Game 7 of the World Series on the road. U.S. President Jimmy Carter made an appearance in Game 7, he threw out the first ball, and after the game made a visit to the victorious Pittsburgh locker room.

Willie Stargell at 38 was the oldest player to win MVP honors for both the National League and the World Series. In the World Series, he hit .400 with a record seven extra-base hits and matched Reggie Jackson's record of 25 total bases, set in 1977. Stargell, Bruce Kison, Rennie Stennett, and Manny Sanguillén were the only players left over from the 1971 World Series when the Pirates beat the Orioles. For Baltimore, Jim Palmer, Mark Belanger, coach Frank Robinson (who played on the 1971 team), and manager Earl Weaver were the only ones still with the team that faced the Pirates in 1971.

==== Game 1 ====
October 10, 1979, at Memorial Stadium in Baltimore, Maryland. Attendance: 53,735

Team	1	2	3	4	5	6	7	8	9	R	H	E
Pittsburgh	0	0	0	1	0	2	0	1	0	4	11	3
Baltimore	5	0	0	0	0	0	0	0	0	5	6	3
W: Mike Flanagan (1-0) L: Bruce Kison (0-1)
HR: PIT – Willie Stargell (1); BAL – Doug Decinces (1)

==== Game 2 ====
October 11, 1979, at Memorial Stadium in Baltimore, Maryland. Attendance: 53,739

Team	1	2	3	4	5	6	7	8	9	R	H	E
Pittsburgh	0	2	0	0	0	0	0	0	1	3	11	2
Baltimore	0	1	0	0	0	1	0	0	0	2	6	1
W: Don Robinson (1-0) L: Don Stanhouse (0-1) S: Kent Tekulve (1)
HR: PIT – none; BAL – Eddie Murray (1)

==== Game 3 ====
October 12, 1979, at Three Rivers Stadium in Pittsburgh, Pennsylvania. Attendance: 50,848

Team	1	2	3	4	5	6	7	8	9	R	H	E
Baltimore	0	0	2	5	0	0	1	0	0	8	13	0
Pittsburgh	1	2	0	0	0	1	0	0	0	4	9	2
W: Scott McGregor (1-0) L: John Candelaria (0-1)
HR: BAL – Benny Ayala (1); PIT – none

==== Game 4 ====
October 13, 1979, at Three Rivers Stadium in Pittsburgh, Pennsylvania. Attendance: 50,883

Team	1	2	3	4	5	6	7	8	9	R	H	E
Baltimore	0	0	3	0	0	0	0	6	0	9	12	0
Pittsburgh	0	4	0	0	1	1	0	0	0	6	17	1
W: Tim Stoddard (1-0) L: Kent Tekulve (0-1)
HR: BAL – none; PIT – Willie Stargell (2)

==== Game 5 ====
October 14, 1979, at Three Rivers Stadium in Pittsburgh, Pennsylvania. Attendance: 50,920

Team	1	2	3	4	5	6	7	8	9	R	H	E
Baltimore	0	0	0	0	1	0	0	0	0	1	6	2
Pittsburgh	0	0	0	0	0	2	2	3	x	7	13	1
W: Bert Blyleven (1-0) L: Mike Flanagan (1-1)
HR: BAL – none; PIT – none

==== Game 6 ====
October 16, 1979, at Memorial Stadium in Baltimore, Maryland. Attendance: 53,739

Team	1	2	3	4	5	6	7	8	9	R	H	E
Pittsburgh	0	0	0	0	0	0	2	2	0	4	10	0
Baltimore	0	0	0	0	0	0	0	0	0	0	7	1
W: John Candelaria (1-1) L: Jim Palmer (0-1) S: Kent Tekulve (2)
HR: PIT – none; BAL – none

==== Game 7 ====
October 17, 1979, at Memorial Stadium in Baltimore, Maryland. Attendance: 53,733

Team	1	2	3	4	5	6	7	8	9	R	H	E
Pittsburgh	0	0	0	0	0	2	0	0	2	4	10	0
Baltimore	0	0	1	0	0	0	0	0	0	1	4	2
W: Grant Jackson (1-0) L: Scott McGregor (1-1) S: Kent Tekulve (3)
HR: PIT – Willie Stargell (3); BAL – Rich Dauer (1)

==== Composite Box ====
1979 World Series (4-3): Pittsburgh Pirates (N.L.) over Baltimore Orioles (A.L.)

Team	1	2	3	4	5	6	7	8	9	R	H	E
Pittsburgh Pirates	1	8	0	1	1	8	4	6	3	32	81	9
Baltimore Orioles	5	1	6	5	1	1	1	6	0	26	54	9
Total Attendance: 367,597 Average Attendance: 52,514
Winning Player's Share: – $28,264, Losing Player's Share – $22,114 * Includes Playoffs and World Series

== Awards and honors ==
- Willie Stargell, Associated Press Athlete of the Year
- Willie Stargell, 1B, Babe Ruth Award
- Willie Stargell, 1B, National League Most Valuable Player Award
- Willie Stargell, 1B, National League Championship Series Most Valuable Player Award
- Willie Stargell, 1B, World Series Most Valuable Player Award

=== All-Stars ===
1979 Major League Baseball All-Star Game

- Dave Parker, OF, starter, game MVP

=== League leaders ===
- Omar Moreno, National League stolen base leader, 77
- Dave Parker, led NL in extra-base hits
- Dave Parker, led NL in sacrifice flies

==== Other team leaders ====
- Runs scored – Omar Moreno (110)
- Stolen bases – Omar Moreno (77)
- Walks – Dave Parker (67)

== Farm system ==
Level	Team	League	Manager
AAA	Portland Beavers	Pacific Coast League	Johnny Lipon
AA	Buffalo Bisons	Eastern League	Steve Demeter
A	Salem Pirates	Carolina League	Jim Mahoney
A	Shelby Pirates	Western Carolinas League	Tom Zimmer
Rookie	GCL Pirates	Gulf Coast League	Woody Huyke
