= Ed Ott =

American baseball player and coach (1951–2024)

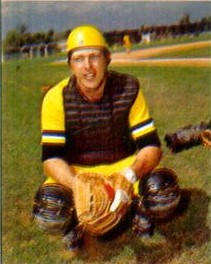
- Ott in 1979
- Catcher
- Born: July 11, 1951; Muncy, Pennsylvania, U.S.
- Died: March 3, 2024 (aged 72); Danville, Pennsylvania, U.S.
- Batted: Left Threw: Right

MLB debut
- June 10, 1974, for the Pittsburgh Pirates

Last MLB appearance
- October 2, 1981, for the California Angels

MLB statistics
- Batting average: .259
- Home runs: 33
- Runs batted in: 195
- Stats at Baseball Reference

Teams
- As player: Pittsburgh Pirates (1974–1980); California Angels (1981); As coach: Houston Astros (1989–1993); Detroit Tigers (2001–2002)

Career highlights and awards
- World Series champion (1979)

Nathan Edward Ott (July 11, 1951 – March 3, 2024), nicknamed "Otter", was an American professional baseball player, coach, and manager. He played as a catcher in Major League Baseball (MLB) from 1974 to 1981 for the Pittsburgh Pirates and the California Angels. Ott was a member of the 1979 World Series champions with the Pirates. After his playing career, Ott was a coach for the Houston Astros and Detroit Tigers.

== Early life ==
Ott was born on July 11, 1951, in Muncy, Pennsylvania, where he attended Muncy High School. He is not known to be related to Baseball Hall of Fame member Mel Ott. Although Muncy High School did not have a baseball team, Ott excelled at football and wrestling. In the summer, he played American Legion Baseball where he became a standout third baseman. Before turning professional, Ott enjoyed playing and learning the game of baseball with his older brothers, Tom and Ron, for Lycoming County's Hughesville Travelers baseball club.

== Professional career ==
The Pittsburgh Pirates selected Ott in the 23rd round of the 1970 Major League Baseball draft. He was a left-handed batter and threw right-handed.

Ott began his professional baseball career in 1970 with the Niagara Falls Pirates of the New York-Pennsylvania League where his manager converted him into an outfielder. The next season, he posted a .292 batting average while playing for the Monroe Pirates then hit .304 for the Salem Pirates in 1972. His performance earned him a promotion to the Triple-A Charleston Charlies in 1973. He was briefly promoted to the major leagues, making his debut with the Pirates on June 10, 1974, at the age of 22, before returning to play for Charleston.

The Pirates asked Ott to become a catcher during the 1974 season, and while he initially opposed the move, he eventually agreed as it presented him with the easiest path to return to the major leagues. Ott spent the 1975 season as a full-time catcher learning the trade in the minor leagues before being recalled to the major leagues on September 16, 1975, at Wrigley Field in Chicago against the Chicago Cubs in a late-season September call-up.

Ott made the Pirates major league roster as third-string catcher in 1976, backing up Manny Sanguillén and Duffy Dyer. The Pirates traded Sanguillen to the Oakland Athletics before the 1977 season, and new Pirates manager Chuck Tanner installed Ott into a platoon role alongside Dyer. He played in 104 games that year while hitting for a .264 batting average.

Known as a tough, no-nonsense player, Ott was a former Muncy High School star wrestler who was not afraid to use those skills on a baseball diamond. In an August 12, 1977, game against the New York Mets, Ott slid hard into Mets' second baseman Felix Millán trying to break up a double play. Millán shouted at Ott and hit him with a baseball in his hand. Ott answered this by picking Millan up in a wrestling move, upending him, and then slamming him into his extended knee at Three Rivers Stadium, severely injuring Millan's shoulder. The incident effectively ended Millan's MLB playing career.

Ott appeared in 112 games for the Pirates in 1978 as, the team battled from being 11.5 games behind on August 25 to finish the season 1.5 games behind the Philadelphia Phillies. He won the National League Player of the Week Award for the week of September 3 and, his batting average improved to .269.

Ott platooned with catcher Steve Nicosia in 1979, and had his best season with a .273 batting average along with 7 home runs, 51 runs batted in and a career-high .994 fielding percentage, second only to Gene Tenace among National League catchers. Led by future Hall of Fame member, Willie Stargell, the 1979 Pirates won the National League Eastern Division pennant, then defeated the Cincinnati Reds in the 1979 National League Championship Series, before winning the 1979 World Series against the Baltimore Orioles. Ott, who was known to be a team clubhouse leader, was solid during the seven-game World Series posting a .333 batting average along with 3 runs batted in to help lift the Pirates to their fifth World Series Championship.

With young catcher Tony Peña ready to take over the catching duties, the Pirates traded Ott to the California Angels in April 1981 with Mickey Mahler for Jason Thompson. Ott had a down year in 1981, batting just .217. Ott tore his rotator cuff and underwent surgery, causing him to miss the entire 1982 season. He appeared briefly as a first baseman in the Angels minor-league organization in 1983 and 1984 before retiring as a player at the age of 32.

== Career statistics ==
In an eight-year major league career, Ott played in 567 games, accumulating 465 hits in 1,792 at bats for a .259 career batting average along with 33 home runs and 195 runs batted in and a .311 on-base percentage. He posted a .983 career fielding percentage.

== Coaching career ==
Ott later became a coach with the Houston Astros, serving under manager and former Pirates teammate Art Howe, from 1989 to 1993, where he is remembered for his role in an on-field altercation against the Cincinnati Reds. In 1991, Reds reliever Rob Dibble ignited a brawl when he threw a pitch behind the back of the Astros' Eric Yelding, late in the game of a 4–1 Reds loss. A melee ensued and the 6 ft 4 in (1.93 m), 230 lb (100 kg), Dibble wound up on the bottom of a pile with the relatively diminutive Ott having put Dibble in such a chokehold that Dibble's face turned blue. Ott later served as a bullpen coach for the Detroit Tigers (2001–2002).

In February 1997, Ott became the first manager of the Allentown Ambassadors of the Northeast League and later the Northern League of Independent Professional Baseball. Ott was named manager of the Sussex Skyhawks of the Canadian-American Association of Professional Baseball for the 2010 season. A former resident of Forest, Virginia, at the time of his death Ott resided back in his home state of Montgomery, Pennsylvania Ott was a past pitching coach for the New Jersey Jackals of the Canadian-American Association of Professional Baseball.

== Later life and death ==
Ott had a daughter Michelle. He died suddenly in Danville, Pennsylvania, on March 3, 2024, at the age of 72.
