= Gary Hargis =

American baseball player (born 1956)

- Pinch runner
- Born: November 2, 1956 (age 69); Minneapolis, Minnesota, U.S.
- Batted: Right Threw: Right

MLB debut
- September 29, 1979, for the Pittsburgh Pirates

Last MLB appearance
- September 29, 1979, for the Pittsburgh Pirates

MLB statistics
- Games played: 1
- At bats: 0
- Stats at Baseball Reference

Teams
- Pittsburgh Pirates (1979)

Gary Lynn Hargis (born November 2, 1956) is an American former professional baseball player who appeared in one Major League Baseball (MLB) game, for the 1979 Pittsburgh Pirates.

== Biography ==
Hargis was born in Minneapolis in 1956, and his family moved to Lompoc, California, in 1971. He played high school baseball in Lompoc for Cabrillo High School, and at age 17 he was selected by the Pittsburgh Pirates in the second round of the 1974 MLB draft. Hargis later stated that he had an athletic scholarship offer from Arizona State, which he considered accepting, but he signed with the Pirates after they increased his signing bonus.

Hargis had a career in Minor League Baseball from 1974 through 1981, with various farm teams of the Pirates, playing five seasons at the Triple-A level. He primarily played as a shortstop and second baseman, while also making appearances as a third baseman and outfielder. He had a batting average of .273 with 33 home runs and 335 runs batted in (RBIs) in 812 games during his minor-league career. He also played winter league baseball during the 1977–78 offseason; while records are lacking, a baseball card features Hargis as a player for Navegantes del Magallanes of the Venezuelan Professional Baseball League. His baseball career came to an end in the 1982 preseason, when he declined to be traded to the Kansas City Royals organization and was granted his release.

Hargis made his lone major-league appearance on September 29, 1979, in a game with playoff implications on the next-to-last day of the regular season, as the Pirates lost to the visiting Chicago Cubs, 7–6 in 13 innings. In the bottom of the 13th inning, Tim Foli singled with two outs, and Hargis was inserted as a pinch runner. Dave Parker then had an infield single, advancing to Hargis to second base. However, Willie Stargell then struck out, ending the game. The Pirates went on to win the 1979 World Series, for which Hargis received an extra $250 ($1,109 in 2025).

Years later, Hargis spoke about his "cup of coffee" in the major leagues: "You keep thinking, 'Just let me get in one game so my name can get into the book.' When you do, it's just like the movies. Your eyes light up, you never want the night to end. You just want to play ball, like you did when you were a kid."
