= Rennie Stennett =

Panamanian baseball player (1949–2021)

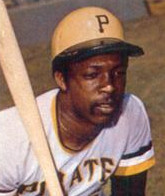
- Stennett circa 1977
- Second baseman
- Born: April 5, 1949; Colón, Panama
- Died: May 18, 2021 (aged 72); Coconut Creek, Florida, U.S.
- Batted: Right Threw: Right

MLB debut
- July 10, 1971, for the Pittsburgh Pirates

Last MLB appearance
- August 24, 1981, for the San Francisco Giants

MLB statistics
- Batting average: .274
- Home runs: 41
- Runs batted in: 432
- Stats at Baseball Reference

Teams
- Pittsburgh Pirates (1971–1979); San Francisco Giants (1980–1981)

Career highlights and awards
- World Series champion (1979)

Reinaldo Antonio Stennett Porte (April 5, 1949 – May 18, 2021) was a Panamanian professional baseball second baseman, who played in Major League Baseball (MLB) for the Pittsburgh Pirates (1971–79) and San Francisco Giants (1980–81). He batted and threw right-handed. A World Series champion with the Pirates in 1979, Stennett is one of two players (with Wilbert Robinson) to collect seven hits in a nine-inning game, which he did in a 22–0 victory over the Chicago Cubs in 1975. Stennett was also a member of the first all-Black and Latino starting lineup in big league history.

== Early life ==
Stennett was born in Colón, Panama, on April 5, 1949. He was raised in the Panama Canal Zone and attended Paraiso High School, the same as Rod Carew. Stennett piqued the interest of the New York Yankees, San Francisco Giants, and Houston Astros, who wanted him to continue his schooling in the United States and develop him into a pitcher. However, he rejected their overtures on the recommendation of his father. He was signed as an amateur free agent by the Pittsburgh Pirates on February 12, 1969.

== Career ==
Stennett played for four minor league teams in the Pirates' farm system from 1969 to 1971: the Class A Gastonia Pirates (1969), the Class A Salem Rebels (1970), the Triple-A Columbus Jets (1970), and the Triple-A Charleston Charlies (1971). He made his MLB debut on July 10, 1971, at the age of 20, leading off for the Pirates and going 0-for-4 against the Atlanta Braves. He collected his first major league hits a week later, going 2-for-4 against the San Diego Padres. On September 1, Pittsburgh faced the Phillies with the first major league all-Black starting lineup Stennett led off the game for the Pirates, who won 10–7.

In his first three seasons with Pittsburgh, Stennett was used at shortstop and second base. He also played a solid defense at all three outfield positions, with an average arm and great reaction speed. He showed progress in 1973, when he hit 10 home runs and 55 RBIs in 128 games. Following the 1973 season, Pittsburgh traded incumbent second baseman Dave Cash to Philadelphia and gave Stennett the starting job. Batting from the leadoff spot, he responded with a .291 average, 84 runs, 56 RBI, and a career-high 196 hits.

On September 16, 1975, Stennett became the only player in the 20th century to have seven hits in seven at bats in a nine-inning game, as Pittsburgh routed the Cubs, 22–0. Stennett's first hit in that game came off starter Rick Reuschel and his seventh was off Rick's brother Paul. Pittsburgh also set a major league record for the largest winning score in a shutout game in the modern era (later matched by the Cleveland Indians in 2004). He was the third player to collect seven hits in a single game, and the second to do it in a nine-inning game, equaling the record set by Wilbert Robinson of the 1892 Baltimore Orioles. With Stennett's position at second base secure in a lineup loaded with young hitters such as Dave Parker, Richie Zisk, and Rich Hebner and complemented by veterans Willie Stargell and Manny Sanguillén, Pittsburgh traded up-and-coming second baseman Willie Randolph to the New York Yankees after the 1975 season.

On August 21, 1977, Stennett was batting .336 for the season, but he broke his right leg while sliding into second base in a game versus San Francisco. He was out for the year and had fewer than the required number of plate appearances (12), falling short of qualifying for the batting title, won by teammate Dave Parker (.338). In that season, Stennett collected a career-high 28 stolen bases. Stennett was part of the 1979 Pirates team that won the World Series. He singled in his only at-bat in the series, in which Phil Garner was the starter at second base for each game.

Stennett signed a five-year, $3 million free agent contract with the San Francisco Giants on December 12, 1979. He struggled, however, with the Giants, who released him in April 1982, after just two years of the five year contract. He hit a combined .242 with San Francisco. Not yet 31 years of age, Stennett would never again play in Major League Baseball. He played in the Mexican League in 1982 before finishing his professional career with 55 games for the Double-A Wichita Aeros in 1983. In 1992, Sports Illustrated wrote an article about a huge free-agent spending spree by MLB clubs and mentioned that Stennett had traveled to that year's owners meetings to pitch his services in a comeback; no team expressed any interest and he went home to resume his retirement.

== Personal life ==
Stenett fathered five children; He had three sons: Rennie Jr., Camden, and Roberto, and two daughters: Renee [Lujo] and Nevaeh.

In August 2016, he met with Brandon Crawford of the San Francisco Giants at Marlins Park, two days after Crawford's seven-hit game against the Miami Marlins. Crawford was the first major league player to collect seven hits in a game, although in extra innings, since Stennett.

His grandson, Rylan Lujo, won four Florida 7-A state titles and three national championships (including a USA Baseball championship in 2022) with Marjory Stoneman Douglas High School. Rylan was an infielder for the Dayton Flyers and Georgia Bulldogs between 2025-2026. He was considered a top prospect for the 2026 Major League Baseball draft and attended the 2026 MLB Draft Combine at Chase Field. He was drafted in the 4th round (109th overall) to the Los Angeles Angels in the draft. He signed with the Angels for a $747.5 thousand signing bonus.

=== Death ===
Stennett died on May 18, 2021, in Coconut Creek, Florida. He was 72, and suffered from cancer prior to his death.

== See also ==
- List of Major League Baseball single-game hits leaders
