= Doe Boyland =

American baseball player (born 1955)

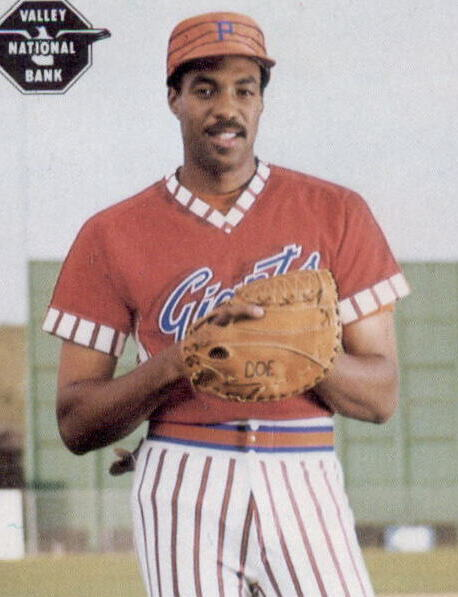
- Boyland with the Phoenix Giants c. 1982
- First baseman
- Born: January 6, 1955 (age 71); Chicago, Illinois, U.S.
- Batted: Left Threw: Left

MLB debut
- September 4, 1978, for the Pittsburgh Pirates

Last MLB appearance
- October 4, 1981, for the Pittsburgh Pirates

MLB statistics
- Batting average: .105
- Home runs: 0
- Runs batted in: 1
- Stats at Baseball Reference

Teams
- Pittsburgh Pirates (1978–1979, 1981)

Dorian "Doe" Boyland (born January 6, 1955) is an American former Major League Baseball first baseman who was drafted in the second round of the 1976 Major League Baseball draft by the Pittsburgh Pirates. After his playing career, he opened a series of car dealerships across the United States.

== Career ==
After graduating from South Shore High School in Chicago, Boyland attended the University of Wisconsin–Oshkosh to play college basketball for the Titans but eventually earned a spot on the school's baseball team.

Boyland played in just 21 games with the Pirates in 1978, 1979, and 1981 and was later traded to the San Francisco Giants.

He is the only MLB player whose first at bat in the majors was a strikeout while sitting on the bench after he was removed with a 1-2 count. On September 4, 1978, the Pirates and the New York Mets played a doubleheader. In the first game, the Pirates tied the game at 4-4 in the 7th. With one out and a man on first, Pirates manager Chuck Tanner pinch-hit Boyland for relief pitcher Ed Whitson, sending the 23-year-old rookie up for his first-ever at bat. After going up 1-2 on Boyland, Mets pitcher Skip Lockwood was pulled for Kevin Kobel, prompting Tanner to counter by replacing Boyland with pinch-hitter Rennie Stennett. Stenett struck out, but scoring rules assign the strikeout to Boyland.

Boyland made his last appearance on the Pirates on October 4, 1981. That December, he was traded to the San Francisco Giants for Tom Griffin. In 1982, he retired.

== Post-baseball career ==
Boyland opened a series of car dealerships in Florida, Oregon, Wisconsin, and other states after his playing career.

In 2019, Boyland received an honorary doctorate degree from the University of Wisconsin-Oshkosh.

In 2021, New York Post baseball columnist Joel Sherman reported Boyland was not interested in working in the Mets front office amidst their search for a president of baseball operations and was "happy to run his car dealerships."
