= Steve Nicosia =

American baseball player (born 1955)

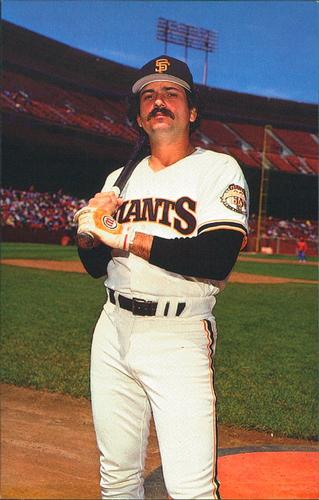
- Catcher
- Born: August 6, 1955 (age 71); Paterson, New Jersey, U.S.
- Batted: Right Threw: Right

MLB debut
- July 8, 1978, for the Pittsburgh Pirates

Last MLB appearance
- September 27, 1985, for the Toronto Blue Jays

MLB statistics
- Batting average: .248
- Home runs: 11
- Runs batted in: 88
- Stats at Baseball Reference

Teams
- Pittsburgh Pirates (1978–1983); San Francisco Giants (1983–1984); Montreal Expos (1985); Toronto Blue Jays (1985)

Career highlights and awards
- World Series champion (1979)

Steven Richard Nicosia (born August 6, 1955) is an American former professional baseball player. He played in Major League Baseball as a catcher from 1978 through 1985 for the Pittsburgh Pirates, San Francisco Giants, Montreal Expos and Toronto Blue Jays. The 1973 first-round draft pick was a member of the 1979 world champion Pittsburgh Pirates team. Listed at 5' 10" and weighing 185 lb., Nicosia batted and threw right-handed.

== Major League Baseball career ==
Nicosia was born in Paterson, New Jersey. He was a first-round draft pick of the Pittsburgh Pirates out of North Miami Beach High School in 1973. At the age of only twenty-two, Nicosia made his major league debut for the Pirates on July 8, 1978. In the following season, Nicosia was primarily a platoon catcher (he started 52 out of 58 regular-season games against left-handed starting pitchers, but only 3 games against right-handed starters) and he was called on to start at catcher for four of the seven games in the 1979 World Series against the lefty-heavy starting rotation of the Baltimore Orioles. Nicosia was behind the plate for the Pirates' World Series-winning Game Seven victory over the Orioles. During highlights of Game Seven of the 1979 World Series, Nicosia can be seen delivering several punches to a fan who tried to take his catcher's mask following the conclusion of the game. The fan was one of hundreds who had invaded the playing surface of Baltimore's Memorial Stadium trying to secure souvenirs of the victory. The mask is preserved in the permanent collection of the Smithsonian Institution's National Museum of American History.
