= John Poff =

American baseball player (born 1952)

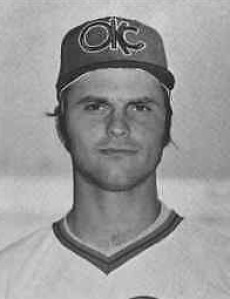
- Outfielder
- Born: October 23, 1952 (age 72); Chillicothe, Ohio, U.S.
- Batted: Left Threw: Left

MLB debut
- September 8, 1979, for the Philadelphia Phillies

Last MLB appearance
- October 5, 1980, for the Milwaukee Brewers

MLB statistics
- Batting average: .218
- Home runs: 1
- Runs batted in: 8
- Stats at Baseball Reference

Teams
- Philadelphia Phillies (1979); Milwaukee Brewers (1980)

John William Poff (born October 23, 1952) is an American former professional baseball outfielder. He played parts of two seasons in the Major League Baseball (MLB), 1979 for the Philadelphia Phillies and 1980 for the Milwaukee Brewers of the Major League Baseball (MLB).

A native of Chillicothe, Ohio, Poff attended Findlay High School, and went on to play college baseball at Duke University, graduating in 1974. In 1972 and 1973, he played collegiate summer baseball with the Wareham Gatemen of the Cape Cod Baseball League.

He was signed by the Philadelphia Phillies as an amateur free agent on July 2, 1974 as an amateur free agent.

On September 1, 1980, he was selected off waivers by the Milwaukee Brewers from the Philadelphia Phillies.

On April 1, 1981, he was traded by the Milwaukee Brewers to the Chicago White Sox for outfielder / pinch hitter Thad Bosley, although played only at Triple-A in 1981 with the Edmonton Trappers of the Pacific Coast League, retiring from the game at the end of that season at age 28.
