= Manny Sanguillén =

Panamanian baseball player (born 1944)

- Sanguillén in 2008
- Catcher
- Born: March 21, 1944 (age 82); Colón, Panama
- Batted: Right Threw: Right

MLB debut
- July 23, 1967, for the Pittsburgh Pirates

Last MLB appearance
- October 5, 1980, for the Pittsburgh Pirates

MLB statistics
- Batting average: .296
- Home runs: 65
- Runs batted in: 585
- Stats at Baseball Reference

Teams
- Pittsburgh Pirates (1967, 1969–1976); Oakland Athletics (1977); Pittsburgh Pirates (1978–1980)

Career highlights and awards
- 3× All-Star (1971, 1972, 1975); 2× World Series champion (1971, 1979); Pittsburgh Pirates Hall of Fame

Manuel De Jesus Sanguillén Magan (born March 21, 1944) is a Panamanian former professional baseball player. He played in Major League Baseball as a catcher in 1967 and from 1969 through 1980, most notably as a member of the Pittsburgh Pirates teams that won five National League Eastern Division titles in six years between 1970 and 1975 and won the World Series in 1971 and 1979, twice over the Baltimore Orioles. He also played one season for the Oakland Athletics.

A three-time All-Star, Sanguillén's lifetime batting average of .296 is the fourth-highest by a catcher since World War II, and tenth-highest for catchers in Major League Baseball history. Although he was often overshadowed by his contemporary Johnny Bench, Sanguillén was considered one of the best catchers in Major League baseball in the early 1970s. While he didn't possess Bench's power hitting ability, Sanguillen hit for a higher batting average. He was an integral member of the Pirates teams that won three consecutive National League Eastern Division pennants between 1970 and 1972, and a World Series victory in 1971. Sanguillen was also a fast baserunner for a catcher and was a good defensive player with a strong throwing arm.

== Major League career ==
1971 print photo of Sanguillén for Pittsburgh Pirates

Sanguillén was born in Colón, Panama. Author Kal Wagenheim, who interviewed Sanguillen among many others while researching his 1973 biography of Roberto Clemente, notes that the Pirates' catcher came to baseball remarkably late.

Sanguillen grew up in a tough barrio and didn't touch a baseball until he was nineteen, when he heard a pastor preaching sermons on a street corner, joined the Evangelical Baptist Church, and became a member of the church team. Two years later he was signed to play professional baseball. (Note: His rapid transition from baseball novice notwithstanding, Sanguillen's connection and commitment to the Baptist faith proved considerably more durable, and to Protestantism as whole, more durable still.)

On the field, Sanguillen was notorious for being a "bad-ball" hitter. Most pitchers will try to strike out an aggressive, free-swinging hitter by forcing him to swing at pitches outside the strike zone when he had two strikes on him. Sanguillen often irritated opposing pitchers and managers by hitting bad pitches for base hits. He rarely walked, and was the only player since 1900 with at least six straight seasons with 475 plate appearances and fewer than 22 walks. This was also why, in spite of his high batting average, his on-base percentage was lower than the league average over his career.

After playing for three years in the minor leagues, Sanguillen joined the Pirates in 1967, playing in 30 games. He played another season in the minor leagues in 1968, before returning to the Major Leagues in 1969. He replaced Jerry May as the Pirates starting catcher and posted a .303 batting average. He solidified his reputation as one of the top hitting catchers in baseball by hitting for a .325 batting average in 1970, finishing third in the National League batting championship behind Rico Carty and Joe Torre.

Sanguillen was a valuable member of the world champion 1971 Pirates. He had his best year in terms of offensive production by hitting for a .319 batting average, while hitting 7 home runs and 81 runs batted in. He also had his best year defensively, finishing third among National League catchers in games caught (135), second in base runners caught stealing (37), caught stealing percentage (51.4%), fielding percentage (.994) and first in assists (72). The Pirates won the National League Eastern Division pennant by 7 games over the St. Louis Cardinals, then defeated the San Francisco Giants in the 1971 National League Championship Series, before winning the World Series against the Baltimore Orioles. In the seven-game series, Sanguillen had a .379 batting average with 11 hits, second only to the 12 hits by Roberto Clemente.

After the tragic death of Roberto Clemente before the 1973 season, the Pirates slated Sanguillen to take Clemente's place in right field. By mid-June, it was apparent that Sanguillen couldn't adapt to playing the outfield and he was moved back to the catcher's position. Sanguillen had another strong year in 1975, when he posted a .328 batting average, third in the National League batting championship behind Bill Madlock and Ted Simmons. In 1977, Sanguillen was traded by the Pirates to the Oakland Athletics for the services of then-A's manager Chuck Tanner and $100,000 as a settlement of Tanner's contract with the A's.

After one season with the A's, Sanguillen was traded back to the Pirates for Miguel Diloné and Elías Sosa. He played in only 85 games in 1978, mostly as a first baseman as Ed Ott and Duffy Dyer platooned at the catcher's position. His playing time diminished further in 1979, playing in only 56 games, although he contributed a two-out, game-winning single and RBI for the Pirates in Game 2 of the 1979 World Series against the Orioles. The 1980 season was Sanguillen's last in the majors, although he returned in 1982 to play in the Mexican League.

Sanguillen was a close friend of his teammate Roberto Clemente. In 1972, Sanguillen, who had been playing winter baseball with the San Juan Senators, spoke to Clemente about accompanying him on a relief mission to Nicaragua. Sanguillen missed the plane because he had misplaced his car key and was totally devastated when he learned the plane had crashed, killing Clemente. Against the advice of Pirates General Manager Joe Brown, Sanguillen insisted on helping to recover the bodies of those who died in the crash. The sight of many sharks swimming in the water did not stop Sanguillen. As Pirates teammate Steve Blass told The Sporting News, "Manny dove from dawn till midnight." So focused on this task was he that he missed the January 4 memorial service attended by his Pirates teammates.

== Career statistics ==
In a 13-year career, Sanguillen played in 1,448 games, accumulating 1,500 hits in 5,062 at bats for a .296 career batting average, along with 65 home runs and 585 runs batted in. He ended his career with a .986 fielding percentage. Sanguillen was the Pirates' catcher on September 20, 1969 when Bob Moose pitched a no-hitter. Along with his three All-Star Game appearances, he was a member of two world championship winning teams in 1971 and 1979, and finished in eighth place in the 1971 Most Valuable Player Award balloting results. Sanguillen edged out Johnny Bench on The Sporting News National League All-Star Team in 1971, the only time between 1967 and 1975 that Bench was not selected.

Sanguillen currently operates "Manny's BBQ", a barbecue-style concession stand at the Pirates' current home, PNC Park. He sits in a chair greeting fans in line to buy food, signing autographs and posing for photos.

Before the Pirates' win over the Cincinnati Reds at PNC Park on August 24, 2019, Sanguillen was inducted into the Hispanic Heritage Baseball Museum Hall of Fame in a special ceremony before over 26,000 fans. Sanguillen was subsequently also inducted into the Pittsburgh Pirates Hall of Fame in 2024.

== See also ==
- List of Afro-Latinos
