= Frank Taveras =

Dominican baseball player (born 1949)

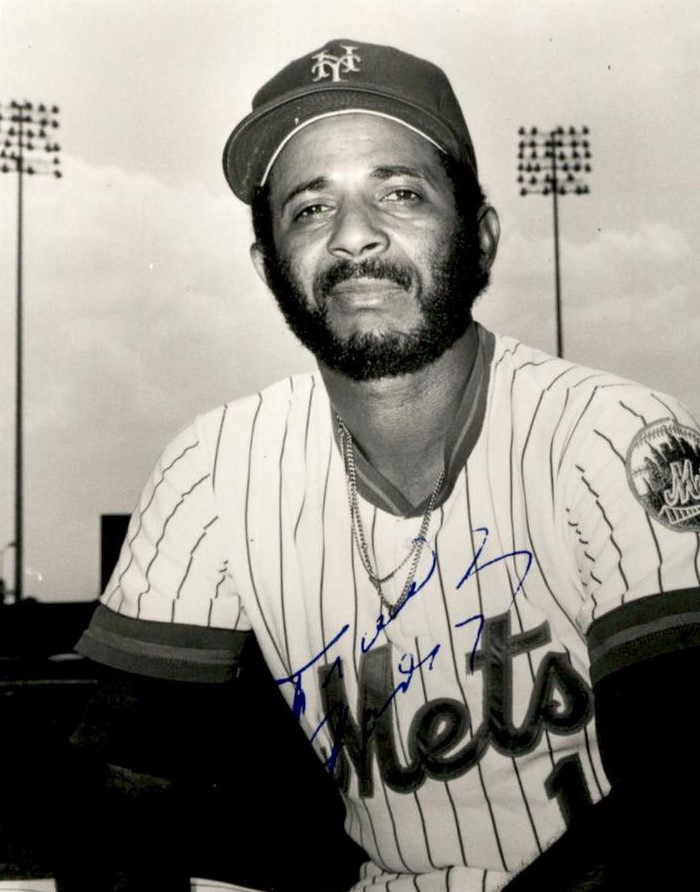
- Shortstop
- Born: December 24, 1949 (age 76); Las Matas de Santa Cruz, Dominican Republic
- Batted: Right Threw: Right

MLB debut
- September 25, 1971, for the Pittsburgh Pirates

Last MLB appearance
- July 25, 1982, for the Montreal Expos

MLB statistics
- Batting average: .255
- Home runs: 2
- Runs batted in: 214
- Stolen bases: 300
- Stats at Baseball Reference

Teams
- Pittsburgh Pirates (1971–1972, 1974–1979); New York Mets (1979–1981); Montreal Expos (1982)

Career highlights and awards
- NL stolen base leader (1977)

Franklin Crisostomo Taveras Fabian (born December 24, 1949) is a Dominican former Major League shortstop from 1971 to 1982 for the Pittsburgh Pirates, New York Mets and Montreal Expos.

== Career ==
=== Pittsburgh Pirates ===
Taveras signed with the Pittsburgh Pirates as an amateur free agent January 8, 1968, and made his major league debut on September 25, 1971, as a pinch runner for Willie Stargell in the fifteenth inning of an extra inning marathon with the New York Mets (won 2-1 by the Mets in the bottom of the 15th). After only four appearances, mostly as a late inning defensive replacement in 1972, and spending the entire 1973 season in the minors, Taveras made the Pirates for good in 1974. On August 5, 1977, he hit an inside-the-park grand slam in the second inning of the second game of a doubleheader at Cincinnati. Taveras led the National League in stolen bases in 1977 with 70, and followed that up with leading the NL in times caught stealing with 25 in 1978. In an unfortunate set of circumstances, he was not given a World Series ring in 1971 after the Pirates won because he was not listed on any post-season roster. He also didn't receive a World Series ring when the Pirates won in 1979 because he was traded just weeks into the season to the New York Mets.

=== New York Mets ===
Eleven games into the 1979 season, Taveras was traded to the New York Mets for Tim Foli and minor leaguer Greg Field on April 19. During his first season with the Mets, he hit his only career home run that actually went over the wall against Mike LaCoss. Coincidentally, it too was in Cincinnati. Taveras managed to play in 164 regular season games that year, as the Mets had played nine games when Taveras arrived in New York, two fewer than Pittsburgh had, and Taveras played in every game that year for each team he represented while he was on the roster.

=== Montreal Expos ===
The Mets traded Taveras to the Montreal Expos for pitcher Steve Ratzer prior to the start of the 1982 season. With Montreal, Taveras made his Major League debut as a second baseman. He was released on August 13 after compiling only a .161 batting average in 48 games.

== See also ==
- List of Major League Baseball career stolen bases leaders
- List of Major League Baseball annual stolen base leaders
