= Nino Espinosa =

Dominican baseball player (1953–1987)

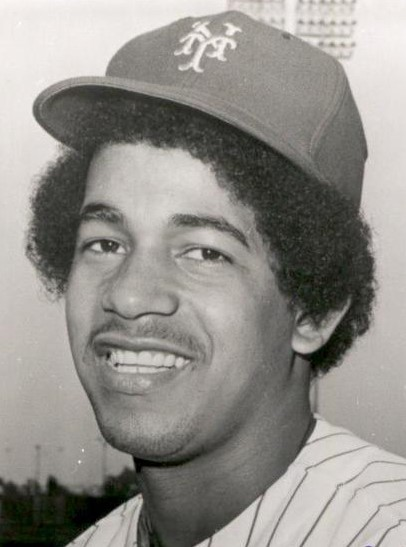
- Pitcher
- Born: August 15, 1953; Villa Altagracia, San Cristóbal Province, Dominican Republic
- Died: December 24, 1987 (aged 34); Villa Altagracia, San Cristóbal Province, Dominican Republic
- Batted: Right Threw: Right

MLB debut
- September 13, 1974, for the New York Mets

Last MLB appearance
- September 23, 1981, for the Toronto Blue Jays

MLB statistics
- Win–loss record: 44–55
- Earned run average: 4.17
- Strikeouts: 338
- Stats at Baseball Reference

Teams
- New York Mets (1974–1978); Philadelphia Phillies (1979–1981); Toronto Blue Jays (1981)

Career highlights and awards
- World Series champion (1980)

Arnulfo Acevedo Espinosa (August 15, 1953 – December 24, 1987) was a Dominican professional baseball pitcher. He played in Major League Baseball (MLB) for the New York Mets, Philadelphia Phillies, and Toronto Blue Jays. He threw and batted right-handed.

Espinosa signed as an amateur free agent with the Mets in September 1970, at the age of 17. He was a September call-up for the 1974 Mets. For his Mets career, Espinosa compiled a 25–33 record. Following the 1978 season, he was traded to the Phillies for Richie Hebner and José Moreno. In 1979, Espinosa had a 14–12 record, with a 3.65 earned run average (ERA), and 212 innings pitched.

Espinosa went 3–5, with a 3.77 ERA, while contributing to the 1980 Phillies World Series championship run, but was not part of the postseason roster. After struggling early in the following year, he was released midway through the 1981 season. The Toronto Blue Jays picked him up, but after only one inning in relief in which he gave up one earned run and four hits, they released him, too. Espinosa retired from baseball after an unsuccessful attempt to make the Pittsburgh Pirates in spring 1983.

Espinosa died of a heart attack, at age 34, on Christmas Eve, 1987.
