= Eddie Solomon =

American baseball player (1951–1986)

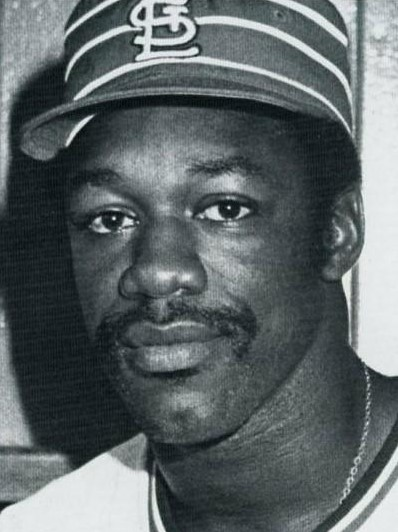
- Pitcher
- Born: February 9, 1951; Perry, Georgia, U.S.
- Died: January 12, 1986 (aged 34); Macon, Georgia, U.S.
- Batted: Right Threw: Right

MLB debut
- September 2, 1973, for the Los Angeles Dodgers

Last MLB appearance
- July 1, 1982, for the Chicago White Sox

MLB statistics
- Win–loss record: 36–42
- Earned run average: 4.00
- Strikeouts: 337
- Stats at Baseball Reference

Teams
- Los Angeles Dodgers (1973–1974); Chicago Cubs (1975); St. Louis Cardinals (1976); Atlanta Braves (1977–1979); Pittsburgh Pirates (1980–1982); Chicago White Sox (1982)

Eddie Solomon Jr. (February 9, 1951 – January 12, 1986), nicknamed "Buddy J", was an American right-handed pitcher in Major League Baseball who appeared in 191 games for six teams between 1973 and 1982. Born in Perry, Georgia, Solomon was listed as 6 feet 2 inches (1.88 m) tall and 185 pounds (84 kg). During his career, he toiled for the Los Angeles Dodgers, Chicago Cubs, St. Louis Cardinals, Atlanta Braves, Pittsburgh Pirates and Chicago White Sox.

Solomon went undrafted in 1969 and signed with the Dodgers as a free-agent amateur. After five seasons in the club's farm system, he was given his first MLB trial in September 1973. But he appeared in only eight games over two seasons as a Dodger, and was included, with Geoff Zahn, in the impactful May 2, 1975, trade in which Los Angeles acquired Burt Hooton from the Cubs. His Chicago stay was also brief, with only six MLB games pitched in 1975 before he was dealt to the Cardinals' organization. The 1976 season saw Solomon's first extended tenure in the majors, when he appeared in 26 games for the Cards, 24 of them in relief. But when 1977 began, Solomon found himself back in the minor leagues. He was traded for the third time in three seasons when St. Louis shipped him to the Braves on May 24. After he spent more time in Triple-A, the Braves recalled him in July, and gave Solomon his first opportunity as a starting pitcher; appearing in 18 games, 16 as a starter, he compiled a 6–6 won–lost record for a team that would lose 101 games. Although 1978 saw Solomon back in the bullpen, he returned to Atlanta's starting rotation in 1979, setting career bests in games started (30), innings pitched (186), complete games (4) and strikeouts (96). Still, he struggled in the won–lost column, going 7–14 and finishing fifth in the National League in games lost.

Nevertheless, his performance attracted the attention of the defending World Series champion Pittsburgh Pirates, who acquired Solomon late in spring training in 1980. The transaction set up Solomon's two most successful seasons in the majors. Working as a "swing man" who shifted between starting and relieving, he won 15 games and lost nine during 1980 and 1981, with four complete games, one save, and a composite earned run average of 2.93 in 2271/3 inning pitched. However, 1982 brought misfortune: Solomon was ineffective in 11 appearances with the Pirates through June 2, then traded to the White Sox on June 14. Solomon worked out of the ChiSox bullpen for six games, and won his only decision, but he was handed his unconditional release on July 2. He retired from minor league baseball after the 1983 season.

As a big leaguer, Solomon posted a 36–42 career won–lost mark with a 4.00 earned run average in 191 games, almost evenly split between starts (96) and relief appearances (95). He posted eight career complete games (with no shutouts) and four saves. In 718 innings pitched he gave up 764 hits and 247 bases on balls, with 337 strikeouts.

Slightly more than two years after his final pro season, Solomon died in a one-car accident in Macon, Georgia, on January 12, 1986, at age 34.
