= 1979 World Series =

76th edition of Major League Baseball's championship series

Team (Wins)	Managers	Season
Pittsburgh Pirates (4)	Chuck Tanner	98–64, .605, GA: 2
Baltimore Orioles (3)	Earl Weaver	102–57, .642, GA: 8
- Dates: October 10–17
- Venue(s): Memorial Stadium (Baltimore); Three Rivers Stadium (Pittsburgh)
- MVP: Willie Stargell (Pittsburgh)
- Umpires: Jerry Neudecker (AL), Bob Engel (NL), Russ Goetz (AL), Paul Runge (NL), Jim McKean (AL), Terry Tata (NL)
- Hall of Famers: Pirates: Bert Blyleven; Dave Parker; Willie Stargell; Orioles: Eddie Murray; Jim Palmer; Frank Robinson (coach); Earl Weaver (manager)

Broadcast
- Television: ABC
- TV announcers: Keith Jackson (in Baltimore); Al Michaels (in Pittsburgh); Howard Cosell and Don Drysdale
- Radio: CBS
- Radio announcers: Vin Scully and Sparky Anderson
- ALCS: Baltimore Orioles over California Angels (3–1)
- NLCS: Pittsburgh Pirates over Cincinnati Reds (3–0)

The 1979 World Series was a best-of-seven playoff between the National League (NL) champion Pittsburgh Pirates (98–64) and the American League (AL) champion Baltimore Orioles (102–57) to determine the Major League Baseball championship. In winning, the Pirates became the fourth team ever to come back from a three games to one deficit to win the World Series. This marked the second time in the 1970s that the Pirates won a World Series Game 7 on the road against the Orioles, the previous time being in 1971. The Pirates were known for adopting Sister Sledge's hit "We Are Family" as their theme song during the season.

Willie Stargell, Bruce Kison, and Manny Sanguillén were the only players left from the Pirates team that defeated the Orioles in 1971, and Jim Palmer and Mark Belanger, along with manager Earl Weaver, were the only remaining Orioles from the 1971 team. Grant Jackson pitched for the Orioles in the 1971 series and for the Pirates in the 1979 series, and Frank Robinson, the Orioles' hitting coach, played for Baltimore in 1971. Pirates' infielder Rennie Stennett was not on the team's World Series roster in 1971.

In this series, each game was played under National League rules. As a result, the Orioles' pitchers had to bat, and Tim Stoddard got his first major league hit and runs batted in (R.B.I.) in Game 4. Lee May, Baltimore's Designated Hitter, was reduced to three pinch-hitting appearances, but if the DH had been in use, Pittsburgh would have platooned Lee Lacy and Mike Easler in the role, which would have negated any advantage to Baltimore.

Willie Stargell was voted World Series Most Valuable Player after batting .400 with a record seven extra-base hits, matching Reggie Jackson's record of 25 total bases set two years earlier. At age 38, Stargell became the oldest World Series MVP, breaking the previous mark set by his late teammate Roberto Clemente, who was MVP in 1971 at the age of 37.

The 1979 Pirates were the last team to win Game 7 of a World Series on the road until 2014, when the San Francisco Giants defeated the Royals in Kansas City. Pittsburgh became the third city to win the Super Bowl and the World Series in the same season or calendar year, with the Steelers having already won Super Bowl XIII (they would later repeat in Super Bowl XIV following the Pirates' championship). New York's Jets and Mets won championships in the 1969 calendar year, followed by Baltimore (Orioles and Colts) in the 1970 season, New York (Mets and Giants) in the 1986 season, and Boston/New England in the 2004 (Red Sox and Patriots) and 2018 seasons (Red Sox and Patriots).

As of 2026, this is Pittsburgh's last World Series victory and appearance, and their second-most recent postseason victory. The Pirates currently hold the longest active World Series appearance drought in the National League, and the fifth longest championship drought in the majors.

== Background ==
=== Baltimore Orioles ===
The same two teams met in 1971. Earl Weaver's Orioles won the first two games of that series only to lose in seven. Gone were the likes of slugger Boog Powell and defensive wizard Brooks Robinson, with shortstop Mark Belanger and pitcher Jim Palmer the only two remaining players from the 1971 roster. Eddie Murray was a star at first base, and right fielder Ken Singleton set career highs in home runs (35) and runs batted in (111). Center fielder Al Bumbry provided 37 steals, and the left field platoon of Gary Roenicke and John Lowenstein, along with third-baseman Doug DeCinces, provided additional power. The starting pitchers were 1979 Cy Young Award winner Mike Flanagan (23–9, 3.08), Dennis Martinez {15-16 (18 complete games), 3.66}, Scott McGregor (13–6, 3.35), Steve Stone (11–7, 3.77), and Jim Palmer (10–6, 3.30). The bullpen, with 30 wins against 13 losses, was led by Don Stanhouse (7–3, 21 saves) and Tippy Martinez (10–3, 2.88). The Orioles won the American League East easily, finishing eight games ahead of the second-place Milwaukee Brewers.

=== Pittsburgh Pirates ===
On the other hand, the Pittsburgh Pirates struggled early, but won the National League East by two games over the Montreal Expos. The Pirates won consistently after acquiring Tim Foli (from the New York Mets) and Bill Madlock (from the San Francisco Giants) in the first half of the season. In a comeback year, the club's longtime star Willie Stargell led them to a sweep of the Cincinnati Reds in the League Championship Series.

The lineup featured the National League leader in stolen bases, Omar Moreno, with 77, as well as four-time NL batting champion Madlock and All-Star right fielder Dave Parker. The pitching rotation was led by Bert Blyleven and John Candelaria, and a dominant bullpen that featured Kent Tekulve, who won ten games and saved 31, good for second in the league.

Stargell hit three home runs in the World Series to become the oldest player to be regular season MVP and World Series MVP in the same year.

== Summary ==
NL Pittsburgh Pirates (4) vs. AL Baltimore Orioles (3)

Game	Date	Score	Location	Time	Attendance
1	October 10	Pittsburgh Pirates – 4, Baltimore Orioles – 5	Memorial Stadium	3:18	53,735
2	October 11	Pittsburgh Pirates – 3, Baltimore Orioles – 2	Memorial Stadium	3:13	53,739
3	October 12	Baltimore Orioles – 8, Pittsburgh Pirates – 4	Three Rivers Stadium	2:51 (1:07 delay)	50,848
4	October 13	Baltimore Orioles – 9, Pittsburgh Pirates – 6	Three Rivers Stadium	3:48	50,883
5	October 14	Baltimore Orioles – 1, Pittsburgh Pirates – 7	Three Rivers Stadium	2:54	50,920
6	October 16	Pittsburgh Pirates – 4, Baltimore Orioles – 0	Memorial Stadium	2:30	53,739
7	October 17	Pittsburgh Pirates – 4, Baltimore Orioles – 1	Memorial Stadium	2:54	53,733

== Matchups ==
=== Game 1 ===
John Lowenstein hit into a fielder's choice in the first inning that could've easily turned into a double play but ended up scoring two runs on an error to start a five-run barrage for Baltimore

October 10, 1979 8:30 pm (ET) at Memorial Stadium in Baltimore, Maryland 41 °F (5 °C), overcast
Team	1	2	3	4	5	6	7	8	9	R	H	E
Pittsburgh	0	0	0	1	0	2	0	1	0	4	11	3
Baltimore	5	0	0	0	0	0	0	0	X	5	6	3
WP: Mike Flanagan (1–0) LP: Bruce Kison (0–1); Home runs: PIT: Willie Stargell (1); BAL: Doug DeCinces (1)

Game 1 was originally scheduled for Tuesday, October 9 but was postponed due to rain and snow. The following night, the first-pitch temperature of 41 °F (5 °C) was the coldest in the history of the World Series until 1997. A steady rain that fell throughout the contest factored into six total errors, three committed by each team. All five Orioles runs were scored in the first inning: two on a throwing error by second baseman Phil Garner, followed by one on a wild pitch by Bruce Kison, and the final two on a Doug DeCinces home run. A pair of RBIs each for Garner (two-out single in the sixth) and Willie Stargell (groundout in the fourth, leadoff homer in the eighth) sparked a Pirates comeback that fell a run short.

=== Game 2 ===
Manny Sanguillén hit a two-out single to deliver the go-ahead run as Pittsburgh evened the Series.

October 11, 1979 8:30 pm (ET) at Memorial Stadium in Baltimore, Maryland 46 °F (8 °C), overcast
Team	1	2	3	4	5	6	7	8	9	R	H	E
Pittsburgh	0	2	0	0	0	0	0	0	1	3	11	2
Baltimore	0	1	0	0	0	1	0	0	0	2	6	1
WP: Don Robinson (1–0) LP: Don Stanhouse (0–1) Sv: Kent Tekulve (1); Home runs: PIT: None; BAL: Eddie Murray (1)

This time, the Pirates struck first with two in the second on an RBI single by Bill Madlock and a sacrifice fly by Ed Ott. The Orioles countered in the bottom half with an Eddie Murray homer. Murray tied the game in the sixth by doubling in Ken Singleton. Murray tried to put the Orioles ahead in the same inning by attempting to score on a fly out to right by John Lowenstein, but Dave Parker threw him out easily. Murray tried to bowl Ott over at home plate, but was not successful.

In the eighth, with DeCinces on 1st, Murray on 2nd, and no outs, Lowenstein grounded to shortstop Tim Foli. Murray, who had to go to third, stopped. Foli attempted a tag, which Murray eluded. Foli then threw to Garner at second to force out DeCinces. Murray's hesitation allowed Garner to throw to third, catching Murray in a rundown for a double play. Murray should have run back to second immediately, since he was entitled to the base after DeCinces was out.

Murray did not collect another hit or an RBI for the rest of the Series.

In the ninth, after a two-out single by Ott and a walk to Garner, Manny Sanguillén batted for Don Robinson and hit an outside fastball from Don Stanhouse into right field for a single. Ott slid past the outstretched arm of catcher Rick Dempsey to score the winning run, after Murray mistakenly cut off a strong throw from Ken Singleton. Kent Tekulve retired the side in the ninth for the save.

=== Game 3 ===
October 12, 1979 8:30 pm (ET) at Three Rivers Stadium in Pittsburgh, Pennsylvania 51 °F (11 °C), overcast
Team	1	2	3	4	5	6	7	8	9	R	H	E
Baltimore	0	0	2	5	0	0	1	0	0	8	13	0
Pittsburgh	1	2	0	0	0	1	0	0	0	4	9	2
WP: Scott McGregor (1–0) LP: John Candelaria (0–1); Home runs: BAL: Benny Ayala (1); PIT: None

The Pirates jumped out to an early 3–0 lead on a Dave Parker sacrifice fly in the first and a one-out, two-run double by Garner in the second. A Benny Ayala one-out, two-run homer cut the Orioles' deficit to one just before a 67-minute rain delay in the third inning. The Orioles seized the momentum after play resumed by scoring five runs in the fourth, highlighted by a Kiko Garcia bases-loaded triple that chased starter John Candelaria from the game along with an RBI single by Ken Singleton and a groundout by Doug DeCinces off of Enrique Romo. Garcia added a two-out RBI single in the seventh, finishing the game 4-for-4 with four RBI. Scott McGregor allowed one run after the second inning (on Bill Madlock's RBI single in the sixth after a Willie Stargell double) and pitched a complete game to give the Orioles a 2–1 series lead.

=== Game 4 ===
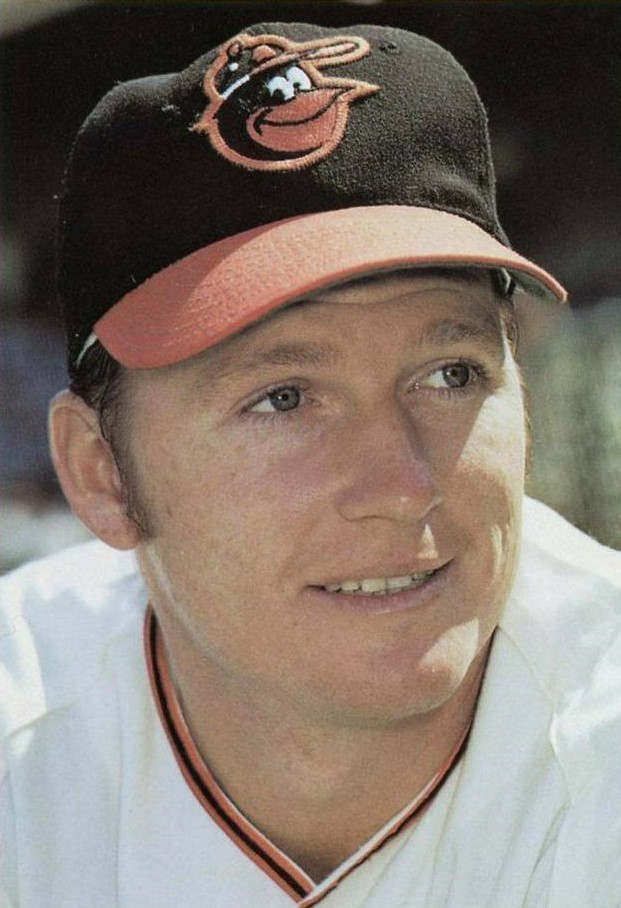
Terry Crowley hit a crucial two-run double to give Baltimore the lead in a six-run eighth inning as the Orioles prevailed to get within one win from a World Series title.

October 13, 1979 1:00 pm (ET) at Three Rivers Stadium in Pittsburgh, Pennsylvania 43 °F (6 °C), mostly cloudy
Team	1	2	3	4	5	6	7	8	9	R	H	E
Baltimore	0	0	3	0	0	0	0	6	0	9	12	0
Pittsburgh	0	4	0	0	1	1	0	0	0	6	17	1
WP: Tim Stoddard (1–0) LP: Kent Tekulve (0–1); Home runs: BAL: None; PIT: Willie Stargell (2)

The Pirates seized an early 4–0 lead in the second on a leadoff homer by Stargell, a two-run double by Ott, and a two-out RBI single by Omar Moreno, leading to an early exit from the game for starter Dennis Martínez. The Orioles countered with three runs in the third off of Jim Bibby on one-out doubles by Garcia and Ken Singleton. The Pirates stretched the lead to 6–3 on RBI doubles by John Milner and Parker in the fifth and sixth innings respectively.

With one out in the eighth and the bases loaded, Chuck Tanner sent Kent Tekulve in to face Gary Roenicke. Earl Weaver countered with pinch-hitter John Lowenstein, who hit a two-run double. After a walk loaded the bases, Weaver sent Terry Crowley up to bat for Dave Skaggs. Crowley's two-run double off Tekulve gave the Orioles the lead. Tim Stoddard, batting only because Weaver was out of pinch hitters, followed with an RBI single. An RBI groundout by Al Bumbry ended the scoring.

=== Game 5 ===
October 14, 1979 4:30 pm (ET) at Three Rivers Stadium in Pittsburgh, Pennsylvania 46 °F (8 °C), mostly cloudy
Team	1	2	3	4	5	6	7	8	9	R	H	E
Baltimore	0	0	0	0	1	0	0	0	0	1	6	2
Pittsburgh	0	0	0	0	0	2	2	3	X	7	13	1
WP: Bert Blyleven (1–0) LP: Mike Flanagan (1–1)

With the world championship on the line, Chuck Tanner went with Jim Rooker as his starter after Rooker pitched well in relief of Bruce Kison in Game 1. Tanner planned to let Rooker go as far as he could, followed by Bert Blyleven to finish and saving John Candelaria and Jim Bibby for Games 6 and 7. The move paid off when Rooker retired the first ten Orioles, had a no-hitter through four innings, and held the Orioles to one run through five innings after Gary Roenicke scored on a double play. The Pirates got to Mike Flanagan in the sixth on a sacrifice fly by Willie Stargell and an RBI single by Bill Madlock. The Pirates added two more in the seventh on a triple by Tim Foli and a double by Dave Parker, and three more in the eighth on a single by Phil Garner and a two-run single by Foli. Thanks to Rooker and Blyleven, a 4–for–4 day from Madlock, and Foli's three RBIs, the Pirates staved off defeat.

Chuck Tanner's mother died the morning of the game. According to Kent Tekulve, Tanner told the team before the game that his mother "knew we needed some help, so she went to get us some." 1960 World Series hero Bill Mazeroski threw out the first ball. This was the last World Series game played at Three Rivers Stadium, and, to date, the last World Series game played in Pittsburgh.

=== Game 6 ===
Dave Parker scored the first run for Pittsburgh with an RBI single as Pittsburgh shutout Baltimore to force Game 7.

October 16, 1979 8:30 pm (ET) at Memorial Stadium in Baltimore, Maryland 55 °F (13 °C), overcast
Team	1	2	3	4	5	6	7	8	9	R	H	E
Pittsburgh	0	0	0	0	0	0	2	2	0	4	10	0
Baltimore	0	0	0	0	0	0	0	0	0	0	7	1
WP: John Candelaria (1–1) LP: Jim Palmer (0–1) Sv: Kent Tekulve (2)

Back at Memorial Stadium, John Candelaria and Jim Palmer were locked in a scoreless duel through six. Dave Parker broke the ice with an RBI single in the seventh, followed by a Willie Stargell sacrifice fly. The Pirates added two more in the eighth on a Bill Robinson sac fly and an RBI single by Omar Moreno. Kent Tekulve earned his second save of the series.

After the game, Howard Cosell's limousine was surrounded and attacked by Oriole fans, prompting Baltimore police to complement Cosell's private security for Game 7.

=== Game 7 ===
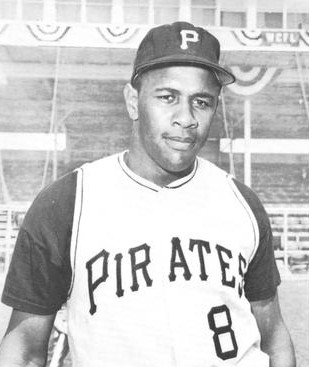
Willie Stargell had a four-hit night in Game 7 on his way to World Series MVP honors

October 17, 1979 8:30 pm (ET) at Memorial Stadium in Baltimore, Maryland 59 °F (15 °C), mostly cloudy
Team	1	2	3	4	5	6	7	8	9	R	H	E
Pittsburgh	0	0	0	0	0	2	0	0	2	4	10	0
Baltimore	0	0	1	0	0	0	0	0	0	1	4	2
WP: Grant Jackson (1–0) LP: Scott McGregor (1–1) Sv: Kent Tekulve (3); Home runs: PIT: Willie Stargell (3); BAL: Rich Dauer (1)

The Pirates finished their comeback on the strength of Willie Stargell, who was 4–for–5 including two doubles and a two-run homer in the sixth off Scott McGregor, who pitched eight innings in a losing cause. In the ninth, Omar Moreno added an RBI single and scored when Dave Parker and Bill Robinson were hit by pitches back-to-back. Orioles manager Earl Weaver made five pitching changes in the ninth inning to keep the game within reach. Baltimore's only run came on a Rich Dauer homer in the third, the team's only RBI in the last three games. Eddie Murray was 0-for-21 in the final five games, including a fly-out to end the eighth with the bases loaded. Following their six-run outburst in the eighth inning of Game 4, the Orioles scored two runs on 17 hits over the final 28 innings.

U.S. President Jimmy Carter threw out the first pitch and paid a visit to the victorious Pittsburgh clubhouse after the game.

This was the last postseason series win for the Pirates until the 2013 National League Wild Card Game. All five of the Pirates' World Series victories thus far have gone the maximum seven games.

== Composite box ==
1979 World Series (4–3): Pittsburgh Pirates (N.L.) over Baltimore Orioles (A.L.)

Team	1	2	3	4	5	6	7	8	9	R	H	E
Pittsburgh Pirates	1	8	0	1	1	8	4	6	3	32	81	9
Baltimore Orioles	5	1	6	5	1	1	1	6	0	26	54	9
Total attendance: 367,597 Average attendance: 52,514; Winning player's share: $28,264 Losing player's share: $22,114

== Records ==
- Five Pirates had ten or more hits in this series, a World Series record. Phil Garner and Willie Stargell had twelve hits each, Omar Moreno eleven, and Tim Foli and Dave Parker each had ten. Bill Madlock had nine. The Orioles set a record for most pitchers used in a single inning (five).

== Uniforms ==
The Pirates wore four different uniform combinations during the series:

- gold cap, black jersey, and gold pants for Games 1 and 5
- black cap, gold jersey, and black pants for Games 2, 6, and 7
- black cap and solid white pinstriped uniform for Game 3
- black cap and solid gold uniform for Game 4.

The Orioles wore three different uniform combinations of their own:

- white cap, orange jersey, and white pants for Games 1 and 7
- white cap, white jersey, and white pants for Games 2 and 6
- white cap, grey jersey, and grey pants for Games 3, 4 and 5

== Broadcasting ==
The series was televised by ABC, with play-by-play announcers Keith Jackson in Baltimore and Al Michaels in Pittsburgh, and color commentators Howard Cosell and Don Drysdale. The ABC broadcast was also shown on the Orioles' and Pirates' respective local television outlets, both of them CBS affiliates: WMAR-TV in Baltimore and KDKA-TV in Pittsburgh, in addition to ABC's own local affiliates WJZ-TV and WTAE-TV. In 2006, a DVD box set featuring the complete ABC telecasts of all seven games was issued by Major League Baseball and A&E Home Video.

CBS Radio carried the series with Vin Scully on play-by-play and Sparky Anderson on color commentary. This was the first World Series since the start of the television era for which the local announcers of the participating teams were not involved in the play-calling for any national broadcast on either television or radio.

== See also ==
- 1979 Japan Series
