= Members of the New South Wales Legislative Council, 1856–1861 =

Members of the New South Wales Legislative Council who served from 1856 to 1861 were appointed for a fixed term by the Governor on the advice of the Premier. The 1855 Constitution of New South Wales provided that the first council following self-government was for a period of 5 years from the first appointments, but that subsequent members would be appointed for life. The first appointments were on 13 May 1856 so that the first term lapsed on 13 May 1861. The number of members of the council had to be at least 21 and subsequent appointments also lapsed on 13 May 1861. The President was Sir Alfred Stephen until 28 January 1857, John Plunkett until 6 February 1858 and then Sir William Burton.

The 3 judges of the Supreme Court, Sir Alfred Stephen, John Dickson and Roger Therry were all among the initial appointments to the Legislative Council in 1856. Stephen accepted the position of President and was particularly active in the council, introducing 14 bills, 6 of which were passed by the parliament. Judges sitting in the Council became controversial and Stephen resigned as President on 28 January 1857. Dickinson resigned from the Council on 29 March 1858, Stephen resigned from the Council on 12 November 1858, while Therry continued to sit until after he retired as a judge on 31 January 1859. Therry's replacement on the Supreme Court, Samuel Milford, was not appointed to the Council and Edward Wise resigned from the Council upon his appointment to the Supreme Court.

The term ended in controversy when Charles Cowper and John Robertson attempted to swamp the chamber by appointing 21 new members on 10 May 1861, because the council had rejected the Robertson land bills. When the council met and the new members were waiting to be sworn in, the President Sir William Burton stated that he felt he had been treated with discourtesy in the matter, resigned his office of president and his membership, and left the chamber. 19 other members also resigned in protest. In the absence of the President and Chairman of Committees, under the standing orders the council was adjourned until the next sitting day. There were no further sitting days before the terms of the members of council expired.

Name	Years in office	Office
Arthur A'Beckett (Note: The original 31 members were appointed on 13 May 1856, and took their seats when the council first met on 22 May 1856.) (Note: The seat of Arthur A'Beckett was declared vacant due to absence on 9 November 1860.)	1856–1860	
John Alexander (Note: 20 members resigned on 10 May 1861, in protest at the attempt to swamp the council.)	1856–1861	
George Allen	1856–1861, 1861–1877	Chairman of Committees
George Wigram Allen (Note: George Wigram Allen and Francis Oakes were appointed on 25 May 1860, and took their seats on 6 June 1860.)	1860–1861	
Lyttleton Bayley (Note: Lyttleton Bayley was appointed on 18 January 1859, took his seat on 19 January 1859 and resigned on 28 April 1859 to successfully contest the election for Mudgee.)	1859	Representative of the Government (23 February 1859 – 8 April 1859)
Alexander Berry	1856–1861	
Isidore Blake (Note: Isidore Blake was appointed on 29 March 1858, took his seat on 7 April 1858 and resigned on 3 November 1859.)	1858–1859	
William Bland (Note: 5 members were appointed on 23 March 1858, and took their seats on 24 March 1858.) (Note: William Bland resigned on 20 March 1861.)	1858–1861	
James Bligh (Note: James Bligh resigned on 16 March 1859.)	1856–1859	
Henry Bloomfield (Note: Henry Bloomfield resigned on 10 November 1857.)	1856–1857	
Edward Broadhurst	1856–1861	
Sir William Burton (Note: Sir William Burton and John Lamb were appointed on 9 July 1857, and took their seats on 11 August 1857.)	1857–1861	President (9 February 1858 – 10 March 1861)
Alexander Busby (Note: 5 members were appointed on 20 May 1856, and took their seats when the council first met on 22 May 1856.) (Note: Alexander Busby resigned on 15 February 1858.)	1856–1858	
James Byrnes (Note: 21 members were appointed on 10 May 1861, but were unable to take their seats before the term of the council lapsed.)	1861	
William Byrnes (Note: William Byrnes, John MacFarlane and Bourn Russell were appointed on 19 August 1858, and took their seats on 25 August 1858.)	1858–1861, 1861–1891	
John Campbell (Note: John Campbell resigned on 7 June 1856 to unsuccessfully contest the ministerial by-election for Sydney Hamlets.)	1856, 1861–1886	
James Comrie	1856–1861	
Charles Cowper (Note: Charles Cowper was appointed on 9 March 1860, took his seat on the same day and resigned on 29 November 1860 to return to the Legislative Assembly.)	1860	Colonial Secretary (9 March 1860 – 15 October 1863)
William Dalley	1861, 1870–1873, 1875–1880, 1883–1888	
John Dawson	1861	
William Day	1861	
John Dickinson (Note: John Dickinson resigned on 29 March 1858 amid criticism of judges being members of parliament.)	1856–1858	
John Dickson (Note: John Dickson and James Norton were appointed on 16 September 1856, and took their seats on 24 September 1856.) (Note: John Dickson resigned on 7 November 1859.)	1856–1859, 1861	Representative of the Government (30 August 1859 – 28 September 1859)
Joseph Docker	1856–1861, 1863–1884	
Henry Douglass (Note: Henry Douglass was appointed on 27 November 1856, and took his seat on 3 December 1856.)	1856–1861	
William Dumaresq (Note: William Dumaresq resigned on 19 May 1856 without taking his seat.)	1856	
Geoffrey Eagar (Note: Geoffrey Eagar was appointed on 13 September 1859, and took his seat on 14 September 1859.) (Note: Geoffrey Eagar resigned on 23 November 1860.)	1859–1860	Representative of the Government (27 October 1859 – 8 March 1860)
William Faithfull	1856–1861	
Robert Fitzgerald	1856–1861, 1861–1865	
George Forbes (Note: George Forbes and Edward Hunt were appointed on 25 March 1858, and took their seats on 31 March 1858.)	1858–1861	
James Giles	1861	
George Graham	1861	
William Hardy	1861	
John Hargrave (Note: John Hargrave was appointed on 10 October 1859, and took his seat on 12 October 1859.)	1859–1861, 1861–1865	Representative of the Government (12 October 1859 – 26 October 1859) (9 March 1860 – 15 October 1863)
William Hellyer	1861	
Edward Hill	1861	
George Hill	1856–1861	
Rowland Hill	1861	
George Holden	1856–1861, 1861–1863	
Thomas Hood (Note: Thomas Hood, William Mayne and John McNamara were appointed on 4 August 1856, and took their seats on 6 and 20 August 1856.)	1856–1861	
Edward Hunt	1858–1861	
William Innes	1861	
Robert Isaacs (Note: Robert Isaacs and Edward Wise were appointed on 19 February 1857, and took their seats on 25 February 1857.)	1857–1861	
Robert Jenkins (Note: Robert Jenkins died on 26 October 1859.)	1856–1859	
Robert Johnson	1856–1861, 1863–1866	
David Jones (Note: David Jones resigned on 29 March 1860.)	1856–1860	
Edward Knox (Note: Edward Knox resigned on 9 November 1857.)	1856–1857, 1881–1894	
John Lamb	1857–1861	
Andrew Lang (Note: Andrew Lang was appointed on 29 March 1858, and took his seat on 31 March 1858.)	1858–1861	
George Leary	1861	
Robert Lethbridge (Note: Robert Lethbridge resigned on 16 November 1857.)	1856–1857	
Francis Lord	1856–1861, 1864–1892	
Alfred Lutwyche (Note: Alfred Lutwyche and Charles Riley were appointed on 12 September 1856, and took their seats on 24 September 1856.) (Note: Alfred Lutwyche resigned on 22 February 1859 having been appointed Resident Judge at Moreton Bay.)	1856–1859	Representative of the Government (12 September 1856 – 2 October 1856) (19 November 1857 – 21 February 1859)
John MacFarlane	1858–1861, 1861–1870	
William Mayne (Note: William Mayne resigned on 25 August 1856 when he was appointed Auditor-General.)	1856	Representative of the Government (6 June 1856 – 25 August 1856 )
John McNamara (Note: John McNamara resigned on 27 August 1859.)	1856–1859	
Francis Merewether	1856–1861, 1861–1865	
James Mitchell	1856–1861, 1861–1869	
Jacob Montefiore (Note: Jacob Montefiore resigned on 23 April 1860.)	1856–1860, 1874–1877	
James Murphy	1861	
James Murray (Note: James Murray was appointed on 2 June 1856, took his seat on 4 June 1856 and died on 24 June 1856.) (Note: James Fitzgerald Murray died on 24 June 1856.)	1856	
James Norton	1856–1861	
Francis Oakes	1860–1861	
George Oakes	1861, 1879–1881	
Alexander Park (Note: Alexander Park was appointed on 1 May 1858, and took his seat on 5 May 1858.)	1858–1861, 1868–1873	
William Pennington (Note: William George Pennington resigned on 14 June 1859.)	1858–1859	
John Plunkett (Note: John Plunkett was appointed on 28 January 1857, and took his seat on the same day.) (Note: John Plunkett resigned on 6 February 1858.)	1857–1858, 1861–1869	President (29 January 1857 – 6 February 1858)
Alexander Portus	1861	
Henry Prince	1858–1861	
Charles Richardson	1861	
Campbell Riddell (Note: The seat of Campbell Riddell was declared vacant due to absence on 8 December 1858.)	1856–1858	
Charles Riley (Note: Charles Riley resigned on 13 May 1858.)	1856–1858	
John Robertson (Note: John Robertson was appointed on 2 April 1861, to promote the Robertson land bills in the council.)	1861, 1861, 1878–1881	Secretary for Lands (9 March 1860 – 15 October 1863)
Ralph Robey	1858–1861, 1861–1864	
Bourn Russell	1858–1861, 1861–1880	
Henry Smith (Note: Henry Gilbert Smith resigned on 28 July 1858.)	1856–1858	
William Spain (Note: William Spain was appointed on 28 October 1856, and took his seat on 31 October 1856.) (Note: William Spain resigned on 20 May 1858.)	1856–1858	
Sir Alfred Stephen (Note: Sir Alfred Stephen resigned on 12 November 1858 amid criticism of judges being members of parliament.)	1856–1858, 1875–1879, 1879–1885, 1885–1890	President (20 May 1856 – 28 January 1857)
James Taylor	1861	
Roger Therry (Note: Roger Therry resigned on 3 March 1859 to retire to England.)	1856–1859	
Edward Deas Thomson	1856–1861, 1861–1879	Representative of the Government (3 October 1856 – 7 September 1857)
George Thornton	1861, 1877–1891	
Robert Tooth (Note: Robert Tooth resigned on 5 February 1857.)	1856–1857	
Robert Towns	1856–1861, 1863–1873	
James Walker (Note: James Walker died on 24 November 1856.)	1856	
John Waller	1861	
Randolph Want	1856–1861	
Alexander Warren (Note: Alexander Warren resigned on 10 March 1858.)	1856–1858	
John Williams	1861	
James Wilshire (Note: James Wilshire died on 30 August 1860.)	1858–1860	
Edward Wise (Note: Edward Wise resigned on 15 February 1860 having been appointed Judge of the Supreme Court.)	1857–1860	Attorney General (27 October 1859 – 13 February 1860)

== See also ==
- Donaldson ministry (1856)
- First Cowper ministry (1856)
- Parker ministry (1856–1857)
- Second Cowper ministry (1857–1859)
- Forster ministry (1859–1860)
- First Robertson ministry (1860–1861)
- Third Cowper ministry (1861–1863)
