= Alexander Busby =

Alexander Busby may refer to:

- Alexander Busby (politician) (1808–1873), English-born Australian politician
- Matt Busby (Sir Alexander Matthew Busby, 1909–1994), Scottish football player and manager
