= William Innes =

William Innes may refer to:

- William T. Innes, American aquarist and author
- William Innes (Australian politician), member of the New South Wales Legislative Council
- William Innes (merchant), British merchant and politician
- Sir William Innes, 8th Baronet (died 1817), of the Innes baronets
