= Grand jury =

Jury that screens potential prosecutions

A grand jury is a jury empowered by law to conduct legal proceedings, investigate potential criminal conduct, and determine whether criminal charges should be brought. A grand jury may subpoena physical evidence or a person to testify. A grand jury is separate from the courts, which do not preside over its functioning.

Originating in England during the Middle Ages, modern examples include grand juries in the United States, and to a lesser extent, Liberia. In Japan, there are citizen Prosecutorial Review Commissions which review cases that have been dropped by the prosecution, but they are not required for an indictment like in the previous two. Grand juries perform both accusatory and investigatory functions. The investigatory functions of grand juries include obtaining and reviewing documents and other evidence, and hearing sworn testimonies of witnesses who appear before it; the accusatory function determines whether there is probable cause to believe that one or more persons committed a particular offense within the jurisdiction of a court. While most grand juries focus on criminal matters, some civil grand juries serve an independent watchdog function. Around the 18th and 19th-century in Ireland and the U.S., grand juries were occasionally formed to pass or approve public policy.

The grand jury (from the French word grand meaning "large") is so named because traditionally it has more jurors than a trial jury, sometimes called a petty or petit jury (from the French word petit meaning "small"). A grand jury in the United States usually has 16 to 23 members, though in Virginia it has fewer members for regular or special grand juries.

== Purpose ==
The grand jury has been described as a "shield and sword" that has both an offensive purpose and defensive purpose. It has been called the shield of the people against the power of the crown; though Green says this is a myth. It has been described as the "sword of the people" and as a sword of the crown.

Federal courts in the United States have nonetheless repeatedly affirmed the grand jury's protective function. The U.S. Supreme Court has described the grand jury's “historic office” as providing “a shield against arbitrary or oppressive action, by insuring that serious criminal accusations will be brought only upon the considered judgment of a representative body of citizens." More recently, a federal district court reaffirmed that “the purpose of a grand jury is to serve as a shield against unjust prosecutions, not as a sword to rubber-stamp criminal charges."

=== Criminal ===
The function of a grand jury is to accuse persons who may be guilty of a crime, but the institution is also a shield against unfounded and oppressive prosecution. It is a means for lay citizens, representative of the community, to participate in the administration of justice. It can also make presentments on crime and maladministration in its area. Traditionally, a grand jury consists of 23 members.

The mode of accusation is by a written statement of two types:

1. in solemn form (indictment) describing the offense with proper accompaniments of time and circumstances, and certainty of act and person, or
2. by a less formal mode, which is usually the spontaneous act of the grand jury, called presentment.

No indictment or presentment can be made except by concurrence of at least twelve of the jurors. The grand jury may accuse upon their own knowledge, but it is generally done upon the testimony of witnesses under oath and other evidence heard before them. Grand jury proceedings are, in the first instance, held at the instigation of the government or other prosecutors, and are done ex parte and in secret deliberation. The accused has no knowledge of nor right to interfere with their proceedings.

If they find the accusation credible, which is usually drawn up in form by the prosecutor or an officer of the court, they write upon the indictment the words "a true bill" which is signed by the foreperson of the grand jury and presented to the court publicly in the presence of all the jurors. If the indictment is not proven to the satisfaction of the grand jury, the word ignoramus (Note: In Latin, ignoramus literally means "we are ignorant of" or "we do not know" – in the context of a Grand Jury it effectively means "we do not know of any reason why this person should be indicted on these charges". This use of ignoramus long predates its more common English meaning of an ignorant person or dunce.) or "not a true bill" is written upon it by the grand jury, or by their foreman and then said to be ignored, and the accusation is dismissed as unfounded; the potential defendant is said to have been "no-billed" by the grand jury. If the grand jury returns an indictment as a true bill (billa vera), the indictment is said to be founded and the party to stand indicted and required to be put on trial.

=== Watchdog ===
In Japan, the Prosecutorial Review Commission is made up of 11 randomly selected citizens, is appointed to a six-month term, and its primary purpose is examining cases prosecutors have chosen not to continue prosecuting. It has therefore been perceived as a way to combat misfeasance in public officials. This is similar to civil grand juries in U.S. states like California.

Similarly, in 2011, there was a private member's bill in Ontario, Canada which would create citizen grand juries to oversee government institutions. The bill did not make any progress and was not passed.

=== Legislative ===
Many early grand juries in the U.S. had quasi-legislative functions like passing legislation or approving taxes or expenditures.

From the 17th century until 1898 in Ireland, Grand Juries also functioned as local government authorities:

They fixed the salaries of public officers; they regulated prisons and houses of correction; they levied funds for the support of hospitals; they made and repaired roads and bridges, and they framed accounts of the expenses incurred in these matters... They determined what public works should be undertaken — what price should be paid for them, and who were the individuals that should undertake them, and be responsible for their completion. They settled the amount of the local taxation of the county, and, under their direction, it was levied from the actual occupiers of the land.

== Present-day use ==
=== United States ===
At the time of the founding of the United States, a grand jury indictment was required for almost all prosecutions, and juries rendered the final verdict of almost all criminal and civil cases. The Fifth Amendment to the Constitution of the United States reads, "No person shall be held to answer for a capital, or otherwise infamous crime, unless on a presentment or indictment of a grand jury ..."

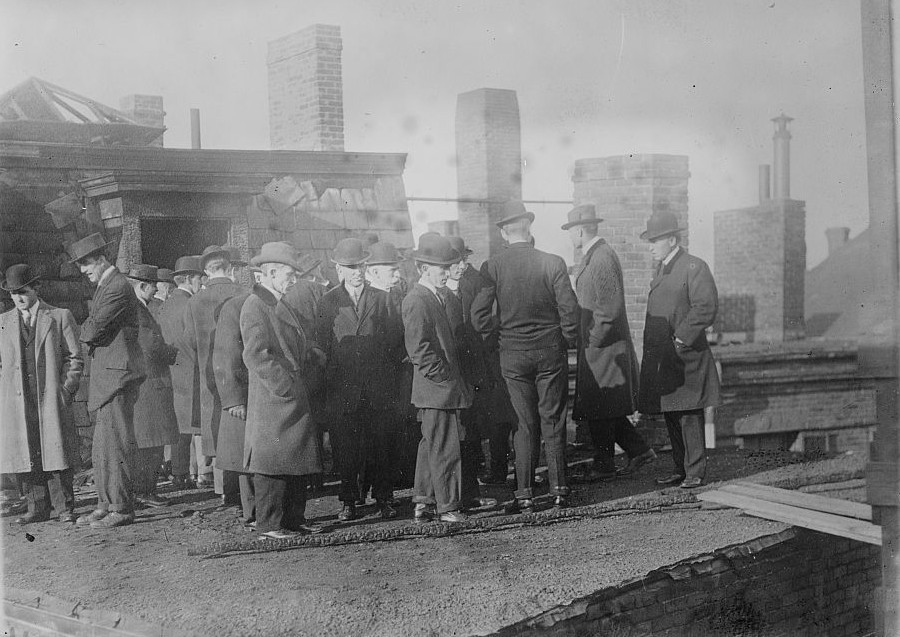
A grand jury investigating the Arcadia Hotel fire in Boston, Massachusetts in 1913

In the early decades of the United States, grand juries played a major role in public matters. During that period counties followed the traditional practice of requiring all decisions be made by at least 12 of the grand jurors, (e.g., for a 23-person grand jury, 12 people would constitute a bare majority). Most criminal prosecutions were conducted by private parties, either a law enforcement officer, a lawyer hired by a crime victim or his family, or even by laymen. A layman could bring a bill of indictment to the grand jury; if the grand jury found that there was sufficient evidence for a trial, that the act was a crime under law, and that the court had jurisdiction, it would return the indictment to the complainant. The grand jury would then appoint the complaining party to exercise essentially the same authority as a state attorney general has, that is, a general power of attorney to represent the state in the case.

The grand jury served to screen out incompetent or malicious prosecutions. The advent of official public prosecutors in the later decades of the 19th century largely displaced private prosecutions.

In 1974, the second Watergate grand jury indicted seven White House aides, including former Attorney General John Mitchell, and named President Nixon as a "secret, un-indicted, co-conspirator". Despite evading impeachment by resigning from office, Nixon was still required to testify before a grand jury. In 1998, President Bill Clinton became the first sitting president required to testify before a grand jury as the subject of an investigation by the Office of Independent Counsel.

While all states have provisions for grand juries as of 2003, today approximately half of the states employ them and 22 states have provision to prevent the abolition of grand juries by legislatures or courts as of 2003. Six states (Oklahoma, Nebraska, New Mexico, North Dakota, Nevada, and Kansas) allow citizens to circulate a petition in order to impanel a grand jury.

An American federal grand jury has from 16 to 23 jurors, with twelve votes usually required to return an indictment. All grand jury proceedings are conducted behind closed doors, without a presiding judge. The prosecutors are tasked with arranging for the appearance of witnesses, as well as drafting the order in which they are called, and take part in the questioning of witnesses. The targets of the grand jury or their lawyers have no right to appear before a grand jury unless they are invited, nor do they have a right to present exculpatory evidence.

Although prosecutors present evidence, federal grand jurors are not passive recipients of the government’s case. Jurors may question witnesses, request that additional witnesses or documents be subpoenaed, and decline to indict even when prosecutors recommend doing so.

If jurors believe a prosecutor is acting improperly or presenting misleading information, they may report that conduct to the supervising judge.

In the United States, grand jury refusals to indict (known as "no-bills") have historically been rare. Federal court data showed that in fiscal year 2010, approximately 11 of roughly 162,000 proposed federal indictments resulted in no-bills; in fiscal year 2013, the figure was approximately 5 out of more than 165,000. Beginning in late 2025, legal observers documented a marked increase in no-bill decisions in federal cases, particularly in matters arising from protest-related activity.

Even an indictment that does not result in conviction can carry significant consequences for the accused, including legal defense costs, reputational damage, and a potential chilling effect on others' conduct. In the United States federal system, courts treat the grand jury's probable cause determination as effectively conclusive and rarely set indictments aside prior to trial.

=== Japan ===
After World War II, under the influence of the Allies, Japan passed the Prosecutorial Review Commission Law on July 12, 1948, which created the Kensatsu Shinsakai (or Prosecutorial Review Commission (PRC) system), analogous to the grand jury system in the United States. Until 2009, the PRC's recommendations were not binding, and were only regarded as advisory. A survey conducted by the Japanese Cabinet Office in October 1990 showed that 68.8% of surveyed Japanese citizens were not familiar with the PRC system. On May 21, 2009, the Japanese government introduced new legislation which would make the PRC's decisions binding. A PRC is made up of 11 randomly selected citizens, is appointed to a six-month term, and its primary purpose is examining cases prosecutors have chosen not to continue prosecuting. It has therefore been perceived as a way to combat misfeasance in public officials. This an inverse of American grand juries, as they investigate if a case should be reinstated after being dropped by the prosecution, as opposed to if there is probable cause for changes to be laid in the first place. In this sense, a Japanese PRC functions for the benefit of the one pressing charges, as opposed to being a check on prosecutorial power.

From 1945 to 1972, Okinawa was under American administration. Grand jury proceedings were held in the territory from 1963 until 1972. By an ordinance of the civil administration of the Ryukyu Islands promulgated in 1963, grand jury indictment and petit jury trial were assured for criminal defendants in the civil administration courts. This ordinance reflected the concern of the U.S. Supreme Court that U.S. civilians tried for crimes abroad under tribunals of U.S. provenance should not be shorn of the protections of the U.S. Bill of Rights. Indeed, the District Court in Washington twice held that the absence of the jury system in the civil administration courts in Okinawa invalidated criminal convictions.

=== Liberia ===
Grand juries in Liberia were included in section 7 of article 1 of the constitution of 1847. By article 21 of the Constitution of Liberia, 'No person shall be held to answer for a capital or infamous crime except in cases of impeachment, cases arising in the Armed Forces and petty offenses, unless upon indictment by a Grand Jury". For example, the national Port Authority's managing director was indicted by the Monteserrado County Grand Jury in July 2015, on charges of economic sabotage, theft of property and criminal conspiracy. It is one of the only remaining countries using a grand jury in this manner.

== History ==
=== Origins ===
Richard Helmholz traces the Grand Jury's origins to the Assize of Clarendon in 1166, an Act of Henry II of England, though others note that the trial jury was brought to England by the Normans, and a form of grand jury may have been used during the reign of Æthelred the Unready. Henry's chief impact on the development of the English monarchy was to increase the jurisdiction of the royal courts at the expense of the feudal courts. Itinerant justices on regular circuits were sent out once each year to enforce the "King's Peace". To make this system of royal criminal justice more effective, Henry employed the method of inquest used by William the Conqueror in the Domesday Book. In each shire, a body of important men were sworn (juré) to report to the sheriff all crimes committed since the last session of the circuit court. Thus originated the more recent grand jury that presents information for an indictment. The grand jury was later recognized by King John in Magna Carta in 1215 on demand of the nobility.

=== England and Wales ===
The sheriff of every county was required to return to every quarter sessions and assizes (or more precisely the commission of oyer and terminer and of gaol delivery), 24 men of the county "to inquire into, present, do and execute all those things which, on the part of our Lord the King (or our Lady the Queen), shall then be commanded them". Grand jurors at the assizes or at the borough quarter sessions did not have property qualifications; but, at the county quarter sessions, they had the same property qualification as petty jurors. However, at the assizes, the grand jury generally consisted of gentlemen of high standing in the county.

After the court was opened by the crier making proclamation, the names of those summoned to the grand jury were called and they were sworn. They numbered at least 14 and not more than 23. The person presiding (the judge at the assizes, the chairman at the county sessions, the recorder at the borough sessions) gave the charge to the grand jury, i.e. he directed their attention to points in the various cases about to be considered which required explanation.

The charge having been delivered, the grand jury withdrew to their own room, having received the bills of indictment. The witnesses whose names were endorsed on each bill were sworn as they came to be examined, in the grand jury room, the oath being administered by the foreman, who wrote his initials against the name of the witness on the back of the bill. Only the witnesses for the prosecution were examined, as the function of the grand jury was merely to inquire whether there was sufficient ground to put the accused on trial. If the majority of them (and at least 12) thought that the evidence so adduced made out a sufficient case, the words "a true bill" were endorsed on the back of the bill. If they were of the opposite opinion, the phrase "not a true bill", or the single Latin word ignoramus ("we do not know" or "we are ignorant (of)"), was endorsed instead and the bill was said to be "ignored" or thrown out. They could find a true bill as to the charge in one count, and ignore that in another; or as to one defendant and not as to another; but they could not, like a petty jury, return a special or conditional finding, or select part of a count as true and reject the other part. When some bills were "found", some of the jurors came out and handed the bills to the clerk of arraigns (in assizes) or clerk of the peace, who announced to the court the name of the prisoner, the charge, and the endorsements of the grand jury. They then retired and considered other bills until all were disposed of; after which they were discharged by the judge, chairman, or recorder.

If a bill was thrown out, although it could not again be referred to the grand jury during the same assizes or sessions, it could be preferred at subsequent assizes or sessions, but not in respect of the same offense if a petty jury had returned a verdict.

Ordinarily, bills of indictment were preferred after there had been an examination before the magistrates. But this need not always take place. With certain exceptions, any person would prefer a bill of indictment against another before the grand jury without any previous inquiry into the truth of the accusation before a magistrate. This right was at one time universal and was often abused. A substantial check was put on this abuse by the Vexatious Indictments Act 1859. This Act provided that for certain offences which it listed (perjury, libel, etc.), the person presenting such an indictment must be bound by recognizance to prosecute or give evidence against the accused, or alternatively had judicial permission (as specified) so to do.

If an indictment was found in the absence of the accused, and he/she was not in custody and had not been bound over to appear at assizes or sessions, then process was issued to bring that person into court, as it is contrary to the English law to "try" an indictment in the absence of the accused.

The grand jury's functions were gradually made redundant by the development of committal proceedings in magistrates' courts from 1848 onward when the (three) Jervis Acts, such as the Justices Protection Act 1848, codified and greatly expanded the functions of magistrates in pre-trial proceedings; these proceedings developed into almost a repeat of the trial itself. In 1933, the grand jury ceased to function in England, under the Administration of Justice (Miscellaneous Provisions) Act 1933 and was entirely abolished in 1948, when a clause from 1933 saving grand juries for offences relating to officials abroad was repealed by the Criminal Justice Act 1948.

=== Scotland ===
The grand jury was introduced in Scotland, solely for high treason, a year after the union with England, by the Treason Act 1708, an Act of the Parliament of Great Britain. Section III of the Act required the Scottish courts to try cases of treason and misprision of treason according to English rules of procedure and evidence. This rule was repealed in 1945.

The first Scottish grand jury under this Act met at Edinburgh on 10 October 1748 to take cognisance of the charges against such rebels as had not surrendered, following the Jacobite rising of 1745.

An account of its first use in Scotland illustrates the institution's characteristics. It consisted of 23 good and lawful men, chosen out of 48 who were summoned: 24 from the county of Edinburgh (Midlothian), 12 from Haddington (East Lothian) and 12 from Linlithgow (West Lothian). The court consisted of three judges from the High Court of Justiciary (Scotland's highest criminal court), of whom Tinwald (Justice Clerk) was elected preses (presiding member). Subpoenas under the seal of the court and signed by the clerk were executed on a great number of persons in different shires, requiring them to appear as witnesses under the penalty of £100 each. The preses named Sir John Inglis of Cramond as Foreman of the Grand Jury, who was sworn first in the English manner by kissing the book; the others followed three at a time; after which Lord Tinwald, addressing the jurors, informed them that the power His Majesty's advocate possessed before the union, of prosecuting any person for high treason, who appeared guilty on a precognition taken of the facts, being now done away, power was lodged with them, a grand jury, 12 of whom behoved to concur before a true bill could be found. An indictment was then preferred in court and the witnesses endorsed on it were called over and sworn; on which the jury retired to the exchequer chambers and the witnesses were conducted to a room near it, whence they were called to be examined separately. Two solicitors for the crown were present at the examination but no one else; and after they had finished and the sense of the jury was collected, the indictment was returned a "true bill", if the charges were found proved, or "ignoramus" if doubtful. The proceedings continued for a week, in which time, out of 55 bills, 42 were sustained and 13 dismissed.

=== Ireland ===
In Ireland, grand juries were active from the Middle Ages during the Lordship of Ireland in parts of the island under the control of the English government (The Pale), that was followed by the Kingdom of Ireland in 1542. They mainly functioned as local government authorities at the county level. The system was so-called as the grand jurors had to present their public works proposals and budgets in court for official sanction by a judge. Grand jurors were usually the largest local payers of rates, and therefore tended to be the larger landlords, and on retiring they selected new members from the same background.

Distinct from their public works function, as property owners they also were qualified to sit on criminal juries hearing trials by jury, as well as having a pre-trial judicial function for serious criminal cases. Many of them also sat as magistrates judging the less serious cases. They were usually wealthy "country gentlemen" (i.e. landowners, landed gentry, farmers and merchants):

A country gentleman as a member of a Grand Jury... levied the local taxes, appointed the nephews of his old friends to collect them, and spent them when they were gathered in. He controlled the boards of guardians and appointed the dispensary doctors, regulated the diet of paupers, inflicted fines and administered the law at petty sessions.

From 1691 to 1793, Catholics and Protestants who were not members of Church of Ireland were excluded from membership. The concentration of power and wealth in a few families caused resentment over time. The system of local government started to become more representative from the passing of the Municipal Corporations (Ireland) Act 1840. A divergence of opinions can be seen in the House of Commons debate on 8 March 1861 led by Isaac Butt. Grand juries were eventually replaced by democratically elected county councils by the Local Government (Ireland) Act 1898, as regards their administrative functions.

After the formation of Irish Free State, grand juries were abolished by section 27 of the Courts of Justice Act 1924, but they persisted in Northern Ireland until abolished by the Grand Jury (Abolition) Act (Northern Ireland) 1969 of the Parliament of Northern Ireland in 1969.

=== Canada ===
Grand juries were once common across Canada. The institution of British civil government in 1749 at Nova Scotia brought the judicature system peculiar to that form, and the grand jury was inherent to it. A similar form derived in Quebec from the promise of the Royal Proclamation of 1763 that a faithful copy of Laws of England would be instituted in the North American possessions of the Crown. Archival records are found that document the presentments of a grand jury in Quebec as early as 16 October 1764. One of the chief complaints was related to the jury trial, and the use of language. The desire for English law was a driver for the division in 1791 of Quebec, as it was then known, at the Ottawa river into Upper Canada and Lower Canada, as each of the two groups (French and English) desired to maintain their traditions. In point of fact, the second law passed in Upper Canada relates to (petit) jury trial. This was continued so that Chapter 31 of the 1859 Consolidated Statutes of Upper Canada specifies the constitution of Grand and Petit Juries in the province (now known as Ontario). The colony at St. John's Island, ceded by France in 1763, and separated on 30 May 1769 from Nova Scotia, became Prince Edward Island on 29 November 1798. Prince Edward Island derived its grand jury from its administrative parent between 1763 and 1769, Nova Scotia, as did Sunbury County when it was split off in 1784 to become the Colony of New Brunswick. The Colony of British Columbia, when it was formed on 2 August 1858, instituted a grand jury, along with the Colony of the Queen Charlotte Islands (1853–1863) and the Colony of Vancouver Island (1848–1866) when the latter were absorbed by the former.

Old courthouses with the two jury boxes necessary to accommodate the 24 jurors of a grand jury can still be seen. The grand jury would evaluate charges and return what was called a "true bill (of indictment)" if the charges were to proceed. or a verdict of nolle prosequi if not. The practice gradually disappeared in Canada over the course of the twentieth century, after being the subject of extended discussions late in the 19th. Quebec abolished grand juries in 1933. It was ultimately abolished in 1984 when the Nova Scotia courts formally ended the practice.

In the present day, probable cause is determined by a judge in the preliminary hearing. In many circumstances, the attorney general can skip the preliminary hearing and have the case go directly to trial if it is in the interests of public safety.

=== Australia ===
The grand jury existed in New South Wales for a short period in the 1820s. The New South Wales Act 1823 (UK) enabled the establishment of quarter sessions, as a subsidiary court structure below that of the Supreme Court. Francis Forbes, Chief Justice, reasoned that this entailed the creation of quarter sessions as they existed in England. Thus, inadvertently, trial by jury and indictment by grand jury were introduced, but only for these subsidiary courts. Grand juries met in Sydney, Parramatta, Windsor and other places. This democratic method of trial proved very popular, but was resented by conservatives. Eventually, conservative elements in the colony were successful in having these innovations suppressed by the Australian Courts Act 1828 (9 Geo. 4. c. 83 (Imp)). George Forbes, a member of the Legislative Council, unsuccessfully moved for the reintroduction of grand juries in 1858, but this was thwarted by the Attorney-General and the Chief Justice.

In South Australia and Western Australia, grand juries existed for longer periods of time. In South Australia, the first grand jury sat on 13 May 1837, but they were abolished in 1852. In Western Australia, by the Grand Jury Abolition Act Amendment Act 1883 (WA), grand juries were abolished (section 4: "A Grand Jury shall not be summoned for the Supreme Court of Western Australia, nor for any General Quarter Sessions for the said Colony"). This 1883 abolition act was itself repealed by the Criminal Procedure and Appeals (Consequential and Other Provisions) Act 2004 (section 5: "The Grand Jury Abolition Act Amendment Act 1883 is repealed").

The Australian state of Victoria maintained, until 2009, provisions for a grand jury in the Crimes Act 1958 under section 354 indictments, which had been used on rare occasions by individuals to bring other persons to court seeking them to be committed for trial on indictable offences. Grand juries were introduced by the Judicature Act 1874 and have been used on a very limited number of occasions. Their function in Victoria particularly relates to alleged offences either by bodies corporate or where magistrates have aborted the prosecution.

=== New Zealand ===
The grand jury was established in New Zealand in 1844. Its function was to consider bills of indictment preferred against persons committed for trial and to decide whether the evidence against them justified their standing trial. At first the grand jury retained the theoretical power to present an indictment of its own motion, a relic of mediaeval times when the grand jury's purpose was to accuse rather than protect from trial. This power has disappeared in 1893. Grand juries were later abolished in 1961 and followed by special juries in 1981.

=== Cape Colony ===
Trial by jury was introduced in the Cape Colony by Richard Bourke, Lieutenant Governor and acting Governor of the colony between 1826 and 1828. The acting Governor, who was later influential in the establishment of jury trial in New South Wales, obtained the consent of the Secretary of State for the Colonies in August 1827 and the first Charter of Justice was issued on 24 August 1827.

Jury trial was brought into practical operation in 1828 and the 1831 Ordinance 84 laid down that criminal cases would be heard by a panel of nine, selected from males aged between 21 and 60, owning or renting property to a value of £1.17s (37 shillings) per annum or having liability for taxes of 30 shillings in Cape Town and 20 shillings outside the town. Black (i.e. non-white) jurors were not entirely excluded and sat occasionally. This is not to imply, however, that juries did not operate in an oppressive manner towards the Black African and Asian residents of the Cape, whose participation in the jury lists was, in any event, severely limited by the property qualification. The property qualification was amended in 1831 and 1861 and, experimentally, a grand jury came into operation.

The grand jury was established for Cape Town alone. It met quarterly. In 1842 it was recorded that it served a district of 50,000 inhabitants and in one quarterly session there were six presentments (1 homicide, 2 assaults, 1 robbery, 1 theft, 1 fraud).

As elsewhere, the judge could use his charge to the grand jury to bring matters of concern to him to the attention of the public and the government. In May 1879 Mr. Justice Fitzpatrick, returning from circuit in the northern and western parts of Cape Colony, gave a charge to the grand jury at the Criminal Sessions at Cape Town, in which, after congratulating them upon the lightness of the calendar, he observed there were indications in the country of a growing mutual bad feeling between the races, etc. This was reported in the Cape Argus and was a subject of a question to the government in the House of Commons in London.

The grand jury continued in operation until 1885, by which time the Cape was under responsible government, when it was abolished by Act 17 of 1885 of the Cape Parliament.

=== France ===
Grand juries were established in France in 1791 under the name jury d'accusation, but they were abolished with the introduction of the Code of Criminal Instruction in 1808.

The jury law of 1791 created an eight-man jury d'accusation in each arrondissement (a subdivision of the departement) and a 12-man jury de jugement in each departement. In each arrondissement the procureur-syndic drew up a list of 30 jurors from the electoral roll every three months for the jury d'accusation. There was no public prosecutor or juge d'instruction. Instead the police or private citizens could bring a complaint to the Justice of the Peace established in each canton (a subdivision of the arrondissement). This magistrate interrogated the accused to determine whether grounds for prosecution existed and if so sent the case to the directeur du jury (the director of the jury d'accusation), who was one of the arrondissement's civil court judges, and who served in the post for six months on a rotating basis. He decided whether to dismiss the charges or, if not, whether the case was a délit (misdemeanour) or a crime (felony, i.e. imprisonable for 2 years or more). Délits went to the tribunal de police correctionnelle of the arrondissement, while for crimes the directeur de jury convoked the jury d'accusation of the arrondissement, in order to get an indictment. The directeur du jury drew up the bill of indictment (acte d'accusation) summarising the charges to be presented to the jury d'accusation. The directeur made a presentation to the jury in the absence of the accused and the jury heard the witnesses. The jury then decided by majority vote whether there were sufficient grounds for the case to go to the tribunal criminel of the departement. Between 1792 and 1795 there was no property qualification for jurors.

The functions of the jury d’accusation were prescribed in the law of 1791 passed by the Constituent Assembly and were maintained and re-enacted in the Code des Délits et des Peines of 3 Brumaire, Year 4 (25 October 1795) and this was the operative law until it was abolished in 1808. Special juries and special grand juries were originally defined in law, for cases thought to require more qualified jurors, but these were abolished in Year 8 (1799).

=== Sierra Leone ===
Under the administration of the Sierra Leone Company, which began in 1792, the Governor and Council or any two members thereof, being also justices of the peace, held quarter sessions for the trial of offences committed within the colony. The process for indictment etc. was the same as the practice in England or as near as possible thereto. To effect this, they were empowered to issue their warrant or precept to the Sheriff, commanding him to summon a grand jury to sit at the court of quarter sessions. Grand juries continued in operation after the transfer to the colony to the Crown in 1807.

Governor Kennedy (1852–1854) was concerned that jurors were frustrating government policy by being biased in certain cases; in particular he felt that liberated Africans on the grand jury would never convict another liberated African on charges of owning or importing slaves. He promulgated the Ordinance of 29 November 1853 which abolished the grand jury. Opposition was immediately mounted in Freetown. A public meeting launched a petition with 550 names to the Colonial Secretary in London, and the opposition declared that the Kennedy ordinance was a reproach upon the loyalty of the community. Grand juries have been considered one colonial body representative of local opinion and the Colonial Secretary's support for Kennedy upholding the abolition inspired a round of agitation for a local voice in government decision-making.

== See also ==
- Blue-ribbon committee
- Examining magistrate
- Immunity from prosecution
- Sortition
