= 1979 Major League Baseball season =

1979 MLB season
- League: American League (AL); National League (NL)
- Sport: Baseball
- Duration: Regular season: April 4 – September 30, 1979; Postseason: October 2–17, 1979
- Games: 162
- Teams: 26 (14 AL, 12 NL)
- TV partner(s): ABC, NBC, USA

Draft
- Top draft pick: Al Chambers
- Picked by: Seattle Mariners

Regular season
- Season MVP: AL: Don Baylor (CAL); NL: Willie Stargell (PIT); Keith Hernandez (STL)

Postseason
- AL champions: Baltimore Orioles
- AL runners-up: California Angels
- NL champions: Pittsburgh Pirates
- NL runners-up: Cincinnati Reds

World Series
- Champions: Pittsburgh Pirates
- Runners-up: Baltimore Orioles
- World Series MVP: Willie Stargell (PIT)

MLB seasons
- ← 1978 1980 →

Locations of teams for the 1977–1981 American League seasons
West East
Locations of teams for the 1977–1992 National League seasons
West East

The 1979 major league baseball season began on April 4 while the regular season ended on September 30. The postseason began on October 2. In the second iteration of this World Series matchup, the 76th World Series then began on October 10 and concluded on October 17 with the Pittsburgh Pirates of the National League defeating the Baltimore Orioles of the American League, four games to three, to win their fifth title in franchise history.

The 50th All-Star Game was held on July 17 at the Kingdome, home of the Seattle Mariners. The National League won, 7–6, and was the eighth win in what would be an 11-game win streak that lasted until 1983.

None of the postseason teams of 1977 or 1978 returned to the 1979 postseason.

Beginning in April and lasting until May 18, members of the Major League Umpires Association (MLUA), in lieu of signing the required individual contracts necessary for the American and National Leagues to field them, went on strike against the leagues, demanding better working conditions and salaries. The leagues hired retired arbiters, minor-league umpires, and amateur officials as strikebreakers in the interim to fill positions necessary for baseball to continue. The strike ended when an agreement for higher salaries, and a two-week in-season vacation was granted to the MLUA. Most scab umpires were shunned and would eventually resign.

== Schedule ==
The 1979 schedule consisted of 162 games for all 14 teams in the American League and 12 teams in the National League. Both leagues saw different schedule formats, as they had since 1977. The American League was split into two seven-team divisions. The schedule format in place since 1977 was modified to be more balanced, with each team was scheduled to play 13 games (down from 15) against their six division rivals, totaling 78 games (down from 90), and 12 games against seven opponents (down from 10 against five and 11 against two), totaling 84 interdivision games. This format would be used until the league realigned into three division for the 1994 season. Meanwhile, the National League was split into two six-team divisions. Each team was scheduled to play 18 games against their five division rivals, totaling 90 games, and 12 games against six interdivision opponents, totaling 72 games. This continued the format put in place since the 1969 and would continue to be the format in use until 1993.

Opening Day took place on April 4, featuring four teams. The final day of the regular season was on September 30, featuring all 26 teams. The National League Championship Series took place between October 2 and October 5, while the American League Championship Series took place between October 3 and October 6. The World Series took place between October 10 and October 17.

== Rule changes ==
The 1979 season saw the following rule changes:

- No scoring decisions in conflict with scoring rules are allowed to be made by the official scorer.
- Rules surrounding caught stealing were clarified:
  - Any player who is tagged out with any degree of movement towards the next base shall be considered to have been caught stealing.
  - However, no caught stealing shall be charged when a player is put out advancing to the next base when a pitched ball eludes the catcher.
- It was clarified that all intentional walks in the context of earned runs are to be treated as any other base on balls.
- Two rules were adopted, though not implemented, due to approval by the Major League Baseball Players Association not occurring until 1980:
  - Previously, any shortened game that was halted due to rain or other circumstances, which saw the visiting team tie or take the lead in the top half of the inning but not see the conclusion of said inning, would be scored as a shortened, completed game as of the end of the previous complete inning. Now, the game is to be considered suspended and completed at a future date.
  - The game-winning RBI was introduced, defined as the RBI that gives a team a lead in which it never relinquished (no matter how many future runs the opponent scored later).
- A rule was put in effect and adopted (though not in the rule book until 1980) regarding protesting games. Even if a protested game was in violation of rules, replay of the game will only occur if the League President feels that the chance of winning for the protesting team was negatively affected due to the violation.

== Teams ==
League	Division	Team	City	Ballpark	Capacity	Manager
American League	East	Baltimore Orioles	Baltimore, Maryland	Baltimore Memorial Stadium	52,862	Earl Weaver
American League	East	Boston Red Sox	Boston, Massachusetts	Fenway Park	33,538	Don Zimmer
American League	East	Cleveland Indians	Cleveland, Ohio	Cleveland Stadium	74,483	Jeff Torborg
American League	East	Cleveland Indians	Cleveland, Ohio	Cleveland Stadium	74,483	Dave Garcia
American League	East	Detroit Tigers	Detroit, Michigan	Tiger Stadium	52,806	Les Moss
American League	East	Detroit Tigers	Detroit, Michigan	Tiger Stadium	52,806	Dick Tracewski
American League	East	Detroit Tigers	Detroit, Michigan	Tiger Stadium	52,806	Sparky Anderson
American League	East	Milwaukee Brewers	Milwaukee, Wisconsin	Milwaukee County Stadium	53,192	George Bamberger
American League	East	New York Yankees	New York, New York	Yankee Stadium	57,145	Bob Lemon
American League	East	New York Yankees	New York, New York	Yankee Stadium	57,145	Billy Martin
American League	East	Toronto Blue Jays	Toronto, Ontario	Exhibition Stadium	43,737	Roy Hartsfield
American League	West	California Angels	Anaheim, California	Anaheim Stadium	43,500	Jim Fregosi
American League	West	Chicago White Sox	Chicago, Illinois	Comiskey Park	44,492	Don Kessinger
American League	West	Chicago White Sox	Chicago, Illinois	Comiskey Park	44,492	Tony La Russa
American League	West	Kansas City Royals	Kansas City, Missouri	Royals Stadium	40,613	Whitey Herzog
American League	West	Minnesota Twins	Bloomington, Minnesota	Metropolitan Stadium	45,919	Gene Mauch
American League	West	Oakland Athletics	Oakland, California	Oakland–Alameda County Coliseum	50,000	Jim Marshall
American League	West	Seattle Mariners	Seattle, Washington	Kingdome	59,059	Darrell Johnson
American League	West	Texas Rangers	Arlington, Texas	Arlington Stadium	41,284	Pat Corrales
National League	East	Chicago Cubs	Chicago, Illinois	Wrigley Field	37,702	Herman Franks
National League	East	Chicago Cubs	Chicago, Illinois	Wrigley Field	37,702	Joey Amalfitano
National League	East	Montreal Expos	Montreal, Quebec	Olympic Stadium	59,149	Dick Williams
National League	East	New York Mets	New York, New York	Shea Stadium	55,300	Joe Torre
National League	East	Philadelphia Phillies	Philadelphia, Pennsylvania	Veterans Stadium	62,382	Danny Ozark
National League	East	Philadelphia Phillies	Philadelphia, Pennsylvania	Veterans Stadium	62,382	Dallas Green
National League	East	Pittsburgh Pirates	Pittsburgh, Pennsylvania	Three Rivers Stadium	58,722	Chuck Tanner
National League	East	St. Louis Cardinals	St. Louis, Missouri	Civic Center Busch Memorial Stadium	53,138	Ken Boyer
National League	West	Atlanta Braves	Atlanta, Georgia	Atlanta–Fulton County Stadium	52,532	Bobby Cox
National League	West	Cincinnati Reds	Cincinnati, Ohio	Riverfront Stadium	52,953	John McNamara
National League	West	Houston Astros	Houston, Texas	Houston Astrodome	47,000	Bill Virdon
National League	West	Los Angeles Dodgers	Los Angeles, California	Dodger Stadium	56,000	Tommy Lasorda
National League	West	San Diego Padres	San Diego, California	San Diego Stadium	50,000	Roger Craig
National League	West	San Francisco Giants	San Francisco, California	Candlestick Park	58,945	Joe Altobelli
National League	West	San Francisco Giants	San Francisco, California	Candlestick Park	58,945	Dave Bristol

== Standings ==
=== American League ===
AL East
Team	W	L	Pct.	GB	Home	Road
Baltimore Orioles	102	57	.642	—	55‍–‍24	47‍–‍33
Milwaukee Brewers	95	66	.590	8	52‍–‍29	43‍–‍37
Boston Red Sox	91	69	.569	11½	51‍–‍29	40‍–‍40
New York Yankees	89	71	.556	13½	51‍–‍30	38‍–‍41
Detroit Tigers	85	76	.528	18	46‍–‍34	39‍–‍42
Cleveland Indians	81	80	.503	22	47‍–‍34	34‍–‍46
Toronto Blue Jays	53	109	.327	50½	32‍–‍49	21‍–‍60

AL West
Team	W	L	Pct.	GB	Home	Road
California Angels	88	74	.543	—	49‍–‍32	39‍–‍42
Kansas City Royals	85	77	.525	3	46‍–‍35	39‍–‍42
Texas Rangers	83	79	.512	5	44‍–‍37	39‍–‍42
Minnesota Twins	82	80	.506	6	39‍–‍42	43‍–‍38
Chicago White Sox	73	87	.456	14	33‍–‍46	40‍–‍41
Seattle Mariners	67	95	.414	21	36‍–‍45	31‍–‍50
Oakland Athletics	54	108	.333	34	31‍–‍50	23‍–‍58

=== National League ===
NL East
Team	W	L	Pct.	GB	Home	Road
Pittsburgh Pirates	98	64	.605	—	48‍–‍33	50‍–‍31
Montreal Expos	95	65	.594	2	56‍–‍25	39‍–‍40
St. Louis Cardinals	86	76	.531	12	42‍–‍39	44‍–‍37
Philadelphia Phillies	84	78	.519	14	43‍–‍38	41‍–‍40
Chicago Cubs	80	82	.494	18	45‍–‍36	35‍–‍46
New York Mets	63	99	.389	35	28‍–‍53	35‍–‍46

NL West
Team	W	L	Pct.	GB	Home	Road
Cincinnati Reds	90	71	.559	—	48‍–‍32	42‍–‍39
Houston Astros	89	73	.549	1½	52‍–‍29	37‍–‍44
Los Angeles Dodgers	79	83	.488	11½	46‍–‍35	33‍–‍48
San Francisco Giants	71	91	.438	19½	38‍–‍43	33‍–‍48
San Diego Padres	68	93	.422	22	39‍–‍42	29‍–‍51
Atlanta Braves	66	94	.412	23½	34‍–‍45	32‍–‍49

=== Tie games ===
2 tie games (2 in NL), which are not factored into winning percentage or games behind (and were often replayed again) occurred throughout the season.

==== National League ====
The New York Mets, Philadelphia Phillies, Pittsburgh Pirates, and St. Louis Cardinals had one tie each.

- April 8, Philadelphia Phillies vs. St. Louis Cardinals, tied at 2 after five innings. The game was suspended in the top of the 6th on account of rain and was replayed on June 29.
- May 25, Pittsburgh Pirates vs. New York Mets, tied at 3 during the 11th inning. The made it to the first batter in the bottom of the 11th, following a routine fly ball being lost in dense fog. The game was called following a 78-minute delay.

== Postseason ==
The postseason began on October 2 and ended on October 17 with the Pittsburgh Pirates defeating the Baltimore Orioles in the 1979 World Series in seven games.

=== Bracket ===
League Championship Series (ALCS, NLCS)
East	Baltimore	3
West	California	1
East	Pittsburgh	3
West	Cincinnati	0

World Series
AL	Baltimore	3
NL	Pittsburgh	4

== Managerial changes ==
=== Off-season ===
Team	Former Manager	New Manager
Chicago White Sox	Larry Doby	Don Kessinger
Cincinnati Reds	Sparky Anderson	John McNamara
Detroit Tigers	Ralph Houk	Les Moss
Oakland Athletics	Chuck Tanner	Jack McKeon

=== In-season ===
Team	Former Manager	New Manager
Chicago Cubs	Herman Franks	Joey Amalfitano
Chicago White Sox	Don Kessinger	Tony La Russa
Cleveland Indians	Jeff Torborg	Dave Garcia
Detroit Tigers	Les Moss	Dick Tracewski
Detroit Tigers	Dick Tracewski	Sparky Anderson
New York Yankees	Bob Lemon	Billy Martin
Philadelphia Phillies	Danny Ozark	Dallas Green
San Francisco Giants	Joe Altobelli	Dave Bristol

== League leaders ==
=== American League ===
Hitting leaders
Stat	Player	Total
AVG	Fred Lynn (BOS)	.333
OPS	Fred Lynn (BOS)	1.059
HR	Gorman Thomas (MIL)	45
RBI	Don Baylor (CAL)	139
R	Don Baylor (CAL)	120
H	George Brett (KC)	212
SB	Willie Wilson (KC)	83

Pitching leaders
Stat	Player	Total
W	Mike Flanagan (BAL)	23
L	Phil Huffman (TOR)	18
ERA	Ron Guidry (NYY)	2.78
K	Nolan Ryan (CAL)	223
IP	Dennis Martínez (BAL)	292.1
SV	Mike Marshall (MIN)	32
WHIP	Scott McGregor (BAL)	1.185

=== National League ===
Hitting leaders
Stat	Player	Total
AVG	Keith Hernandez (STL)	.344
OPS	Dave Kingman (CHC)	.956
HR	Dave Kingman (CHC)	48
RBI	Dave Winfield (SD)	118
R	Keith Hernandez (STL)	116
H	Garry Templeton (STL)	211
SB	Omar Moreno (PIT)	77

Pitching leaders
Stat	Player	Total
W	Joe Niekro (HOU); Phil Niekro (ATL)	21
L	Phil Niekro (ATL)	20
ERA	J. R. Richard (HOU)	2.71
K	J. R. Richard (HOU)	313
IP	Phil Niekro (ATL)	342.0
SV	Bruce Sutter (CHC)	37
WHIP	Ken Forsch (HOU)	1.069

== Milestones ==
=== Batters ===
==== Cycles ====
- George Brett (KC):
  - Brett hit for his first cycle and third in franchise history on May 28 against the Baltimore Orioles.
- Dan Ford (CAL):
  - Ford hit for his first cycle and third in franchise on August 10 against the Seattle Mariners.
- Bob Watson (BOS/HOU):
  - Watson hit for his second cycle, 15th in franchise history, and 11th natural cycle in Major League history, on September 15 as a member of the Boston Red Sox against the Baltimore Orioles. Having done it for the Houston Astros on June 24, 1977, he is the first player to do this in both leagues.
- Frank White (KC):
  - White hit for his first cycle and fourth in franchise history on September 26 against the California Angels.

==== Other batting accomplishments ====
- Carl Yastrzemski (BOS):
  - Became the 18th player in Major League history to hit 400 home runs in the seventh inning against the Oakland Athletics on July 24.
  - Became the 15th member of the 3,000-hit club with a single in the eighth inning against the New York Yankees on September 12.
- Fred Lynn (BOS):
  - Hits his 100th career home run against the Milwaukee Brewers on August 5.
- Lou Brock (STL):
  - Became the 14th member of the 3,000-hit club with a single in the fourth inning against the Chicago Cubs on August 13.
  - Set the Major League record for most career stolen bases when he stole his 938th base against the New York Mets on September 23.
- Pete Rose (PHI):
  - Sets a Major League record by hitting his 200th hit of the season against the St. Louis Cardinals on September 24, giving him ten seasons with at least 200 hits. This breaks the record set by Ty Cobb.
- Joe Morgan (CIN):
  - Recorded his 600th career stolen base in the first inning against the San Diego Padres on September 26. He became the 11th player to reach this mark.

=== Pitching ===
==== No-hitters ====
- Ken Forsch (HOU):
  - Forsch threw his first no-hitter and sixth no-hitter in franchise history, by defeating the Atlanta Braves 6–0 on April 7. He walked two and struck out three. This marked the earliest calendar date for a no-hitter in Major League history until Hideo Nomo's no-hitter on April 4, 2001. This also makes him and Bob Forsch, who hurled a no-hitter in 1978, the first brothers in major league history to both pitch no-hit games during their careers.

==== Other pitching accomplishments ====
- J. R. Richard (HOU):
  - Fires six wild pitches in a game on April 10, setting a Major League record.
- Phil Niekro (ATL):
  - Breaks multiple wild pitch records on August 4 in game two of a doubleheader, tying a Major League record set earlier in the season by throwing six wild pitches. Four of these wild pitches were thrown in the fifth inning, which broke a National League record for most wild pitches thrown in a single inning.

== Awards and honors ==
=== Regular season ===
Baseball Writers' Association of America Awards
BBWAA Award	National League	American League
Rookie of the Year	Rick Sutcliffe (LAD)	John Castino (MIN); Alfredo Griffin (TOR)
Cy Young Award	Bruce Sutter (CHC)	Mike Flanagan (BAL)
Most Valuable Player	Keith Hernandez (STL); Willie Stargell (PIT)	Don Baylor (CAL)
Babe Ruth Award (World Series MVP)	Willie Stargell (PIT)	—
Gold Glove Awards
Position	National League	American League
Pitcher	Phil Niekro (ATL)	Jim Palmer (BAL)
Catcher	Bob Boone (PHI)	Jim Sundberg (TEX)
1st Base	Keith Hernandez (STL)	Cecil Cooper (MIL)
2nd Base	Manny Trillo (PHI)	Frank White (KC)
3rd Base	Mike Schmidt (PHI)	Buddy Bell (TEX)
Shortstop	Dave Concepción (CIN)	Rick Burleson (BOS)
Outfield	Garry Maddox (PHI)	Dwight Evans (BOS)
Outfield	Dave Parker (PIT)	Sixto Lezcano (MIL)
Outfield	Dave Winfield (SD)	Fred Lynn (BOS)

=== Other awards ===
- Outstanding Designated Hitter Award: Willie Horton (SEA)
- Roberto Clemente Award (Humanitarian): Andre Thornton (CLE)
- Hutch Award: Lou Brock (STL)
- National League Championship Series Most Valuable Player Award: Willie Stargell (PIT)
- Rolaids Relief Man Award: Bruce Sutter (CHC, National); Jim Kern (TEX, American)
- Sport Magazine's World Series Most Valuable Player Award: Willie Stargell (PIT)

The Sporting News Awards
Award	National League	American League
Player of the Year	Willie Stargell (PIT)	—
Pitcher of the Year	Joe Niekro (HOU)	Mike Flanagan (BAL)
Fireman of the Year (Relief pitcher)	Bruce Sutter (CHC)	Jim Kern (TEX); Mike Marshall (MIN)
Rookie Player of the Year	Jeffrey Leonard (HOU)	Pat Putnam (TEX)
Rookie Pitcher of the Year	Rick Sutcliffe (LAD)	Mark Clear (CAL)
Comeback Player of the Year	Lou Brock (STL)	Willie Horton (SEA)
Manager of the Year	—	Earl Weaver (BAL)
Executive of the Year	—	Hank Peters (BAL)

=== Monthly awards ===
==== Player of the Month ====
Month	National League	American League
April	George Foster (CIN)	Cecil Cooper (MIL)
May	Lou Brock (STL)	Don Baylor (CAL)
June	George Foster (CIN)	Dan Meyer (SEA)
July	Mike Schmidt (PHI)	Don Baylor (CAL)
August	Keith Hernandez (STL)	Fred Lynn (BOS)
September	Pete Rose (PHI)	Alfredo Griffin (TOR)

==== Pitcher of the Month ====
Month	National League	American League
April	Ken Forsch (HOU)	Tommy John (NYY)
May	Joe Niekro (HOU)	Jim Kern (TEX
June	Joaquín Andújar (HOU)	Mark Clear (CAL)
July	Dick Tidrow (CHC)	Sid Monge (CLE)
August	Rick Reuschel (CHC)	Rick Langford (OAK)
September	J. R. Richard (HOU)	Goose Gossage (NYY)

=== Baseball Hall of Fame ===
- Willie Mays
- Hack Wilson
- Warren Giles (executive)

== Home field attendance ==
Team name	Wins	%±	Home attendance	%±	Per game
Los Angeles Dodgers	79	−16.8%	2,860,954	−14.5%	35,320
Philadelphia Phillies	84	−6.7%	2,775,011	7.4%	34,259
New York Yankees	89	−11.0%	2,537,765	8.6%	31,330
California Angels	88	1.1%	2,523,575	43.8%	31,155
Cincinnati Reds	90	−2.2%	2,356,933	−6.9%	29,462
Boston Red Sox	91	−8.1%	2,353,114	1.4%	29,414
Kansas City Royals	85	−7.6%	2,261,845	0.3%	27,924
Montreal Expos	95	25.0%	2,102,173	47.3%	25,953
Milwaukee Brewers	95	2.2%	1,918,343	19.8%	23,683
Houston Astros	89	20.3%	1,900,312	68.7%	23,461
Baltimore Orioles	102	13.3%	1,681,009	59.8%	21,279
Chicago Cubs	80	1.3%	1,648,587	8.1%	20,353
Detroit Tigers	85	−1.2%	1,630,929	−4.9%	20,387
St. Louis Cardinals	86	24.6%	1,627,256	27.3%	19,845
Texas Rangers	83	−4.6%	1,519,671	5.0%	18,761
San Diego Padres	68	−19.0%	1,456,967	−12.8%	17,987
San Francisco Giants	71	−20.2%	1,456,402	−16.3%	17,980
Pittsburgh Pirates	98	11.4%	1,435,454	48.9%	17,722
Toronto Blue Jays	53	−10.2%	1,431,651	−8.4%	17,675
Chicago White Sox	73	2.8%	1,280,702	−14.1%	16,211
Minnesota Twins	82	12.3%	1,070,521	35.9%	13,216
Cleveland Indians	81	17.4%	1,011,644	26.4%	12,489
Seattle Mariners	67	19.6%	844,447	−3.8%	10,425
New York Mets	63	−4.5%	788,905	−21.7%	9,621
Atlanta Braves	66	−4.3%	769,465	−14.9%	9,740
Oakland Athletics	54	−21.7%	306,763	−41.8%	3,787

== Media ==
=== Television ===
Twenty-two teams (all but the Atlanta Braves, Houston Astros, New York Mets, and St. Louis Cardinals) signed a one-year cable deal with United Artists Television and Columbia Pictures Television, then-owners of the USA Network. The deal involved the airing of Thursday Night Baseball in markets at least 50 miles (80 km) from a major league park. The deal earned Major League Baseball less than $500,000, but led to a new two-year contract for 40–45 games per season.

ABC aired Monday Night Baseball and the World Series. NBC televised the weekend Game of the Week, the All-Star Game, and both League Championship Series.

== Retired numbers ==
- Thurman Munson had his No. 15 retired by the New York Yankees on August 3, the day after he died in a plane crash while practicing landings. This was the ninth number retired by the team.
- Richie Ashburn had his No. 1 retired by the Philadelphia Phillies on August 24. This was the second number retired by the team.
- Lou Brock had his No. 20 retired by the St. Louis Cardinals on September 9. This was the fourth number retired by the team.

== See also ==
- 1979 in baseball (Events, Movies, Births, Deaths)
- 1979 Nippon Professional Baseball season
