= General Bloomfield =

General Bloomfield may refer to:

- Benjamin Bloomfield, 1st Baron Bloomfield (1768–1846), British Army lieutenant general
- Henry Bloomfield (politician) (c. 1798–1870), British Army lieutenant general
- John Bloomfield (British Army officer) (c. 1793–1880), British Army general
- Joseph Bloomfield (1753–1823), U.S. Army brigadier general

== See also ==
- Thomas Blomefield (1744–1822), British Army major general
- Charles James Blomfield (Indian Army officer) (1855–1928), British Indian Army major general
- Valentine Blomfield (1898–1980), British Army major general
