= Henry Bloomfield =

Henry Bloomfield may refer to:

- Henry Bloomfield (rugby union) (born 1973), American rugby union
- Henry Bloomfield (British Army officer) (c. 1798–1870), English soldier and whilst serving in New South Wales an Australian politician
