= Lethbridge (disambiguation) =

Lethbridge is a city in Alberta, Canada.

Lethbridge may also refer to:

== Places ==
- Lethbridge, Victoria, a township outside Geelong, Victoria, Australia
- Lethbridge, Newfoundland and Labrador, a community in Canada
- Lethbridge County, a municipal district in Alberta, Canada
- Lethbridge Park, a suburb of Sydney, New South Wales, Australia

=== Canadian electoral districts ===
- Lethbridge (federal electoral district), federal electoral district in Canada
- Lethbridge-West, provincial electoral district
- Lethbridge-East, provincial electoral district
- Lethbridge (provincial electoral district), defunct Alberta provincial electoral district
- Lethbridge City, defunct provincial electoral district
- Lethbridge District, defunct provincial electoral district
- Lethbridge (territorial electoral district), defunct N.W.T. territorial electoral district

== Education ==
- University of Lethbridge, Lethbridge, Alberta
- Lethbridge College, Lethbridge, Alberta
- Lethbridge Collegiate Institute, Lethbridge, Alberta
- Lethbridge School, Swindon, England

== Other uses ==
- Lethbridge (surname)
- Lethbridge (band), an Australian R&B group

== See also ==
- Brigadier Lethbridge-Stewart (Doctor Who character)
