= George Leary =

George Leary may refer to:

- George Leary (politician), Australian politician
- George Leary (sport shooter), Canadian sports shooter

== See also ==
- George O'Leary, American football coach and college athletics administrator
