= Andrew Lang (disambiguation) =

Andrew Lang (1844–1912) was a Scottish poet, novelist and critic.

Andrew Lang may also refer to:

- Andrew Lang (Australian politician), New South Wales politician
- Andrew Lang (basketball) (born 1966), American basketball player
- Andrew Lang (physicist) (1924–2008), British scientist and crystallographer
- Andrew Lang (Minnesota politician), member of the Minnesota Senate

== See also ==
- Andrew E. Lange (1957–2010), American astrophysicist
