= 64th (2nd Staffordshire) Regiment of Foot =

- Active: 10 December 1756–1 July 1881
- Disbanded: 1881, amalgamated with 98th Foot to become The Prince of Wales's (North Staffordshire) Regiment
- Country: Kingdom of Great Britain (1756–1800); United Kingdom (1801–1881)
- Branch: British Army
- Type: Infantry
- Role: Line Infantry
- Size: One battalion
- Garrison/HQ: Whittington Barracks, Staffordshire
- Nickname: The Black Knots
- Colors: Black facings
- March: Romaika
- Engagements: Seven Years' War, American War of Independence, Napoleonic Wars, Anglo-Persian War, Indian Rebellion
- Battle honours: Guadeloupe 1759; Martinique 1794; St Lucia 1803; Surinam; Reshire; Bushire; Koosh-Ab; Persia; Lucknow

The 64th (2nd Staffordshire) Regiment of Foot was an infantry regiment of the British Army. The regiment was created as the 2nd Battalion, 11th Regiment of Foot in 1756, redesignated as the 64th Regiment of Foot in 1758, and took a county title as the 64th (2nd Staffordshire) Regiment of Foot in 1782. Following the Cardwell Reforms the regiment amalgamated with the 98th (Prince of Wales's) Regiment of Foot to become The Prince of Wales's (North Staffordshire Regiment) in 1881. In the new regiment the 64th Foot became the 1st Battalion due to its seniority over the 98th Foot.

Although the 64th Foot fought in many of the major conflicts of the late 18th and early 19th centuries, it was normally in the more minor theatres of these conflicts. During the Seven Years' War it served in the West Indies; in the Napoleonic Wars, its role was limited, again, to the West Indies and South America. In the mid-19th century, it fought in the Anglo-Persian War and the Indian Rebellion of 1857, where one of its soldiers was awarded the Victoria Cross.

== History ==
=== Formation ===
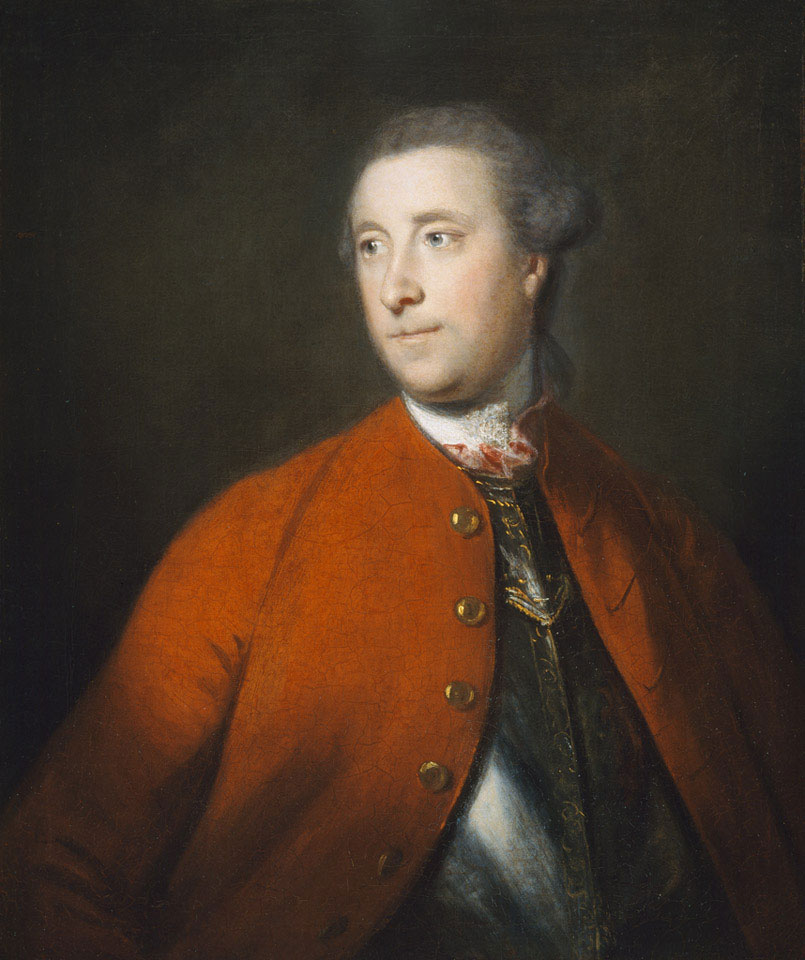
Major-General John Barrington, first colonel of the regiment, by Sir Joshua Reynolds

The formation of the 64th Foot was prompted by the expansion of the army as a result of the commencement of the Seven Years' War. On 25 August 1756 it was ordered that a number of existing regiments should raise a second battalion; among those chosen was the 11th Regiment of Foot. The 2nd Battalion of the 11th Foot was raised at Southampton on 10 December 1756 before moving to Newcastle upon Tyne. On 21 April 1758 the War Office ordered that the 2nd battalions raised two years previously should become independent regiments in their own right and on that day the 2nd Battalion 11th Foot became the 64th Foot. Shortly after King George II ordered that the dates of seniority of the 64th Foot and the other regiments created on 21 April 1758 should be backdated to the date of their raising as 2nd battalions, therefore the date seniority of the 64th Foot became 1756. The first colonel of the regiment was the Honourable John Barrington and it was he who decided that the facings of the 64th Foot should be black.

=== Seven Years' War ===
Almost immediately after becoming the 64th Foot, the regiment was sent to the West Indies. Upon arrival, in 1759, it took part in the unsuccessful attempt to take Martinique and then in the successful invasion of Guadeloupe. Participation in this action earned the regiment its first battle honour Guadaloupe 1759, though this honour was not actually awarded until 1909. The regiment returned to England in June 1759 severely reduced in numbers by men drafted to other units and by tropical disease. On arrival at Portsmouth only 137 other ranks out of an establishment strength of 790 were fit for duty, though officer strength was almost up to strength. Recovery took a long time and after a brief period in Suffolk the regiment spent three years in the Scottish Highlands and five years in Ireland before sailing for North America in 1768.

=== North America and the American War of Independence ===
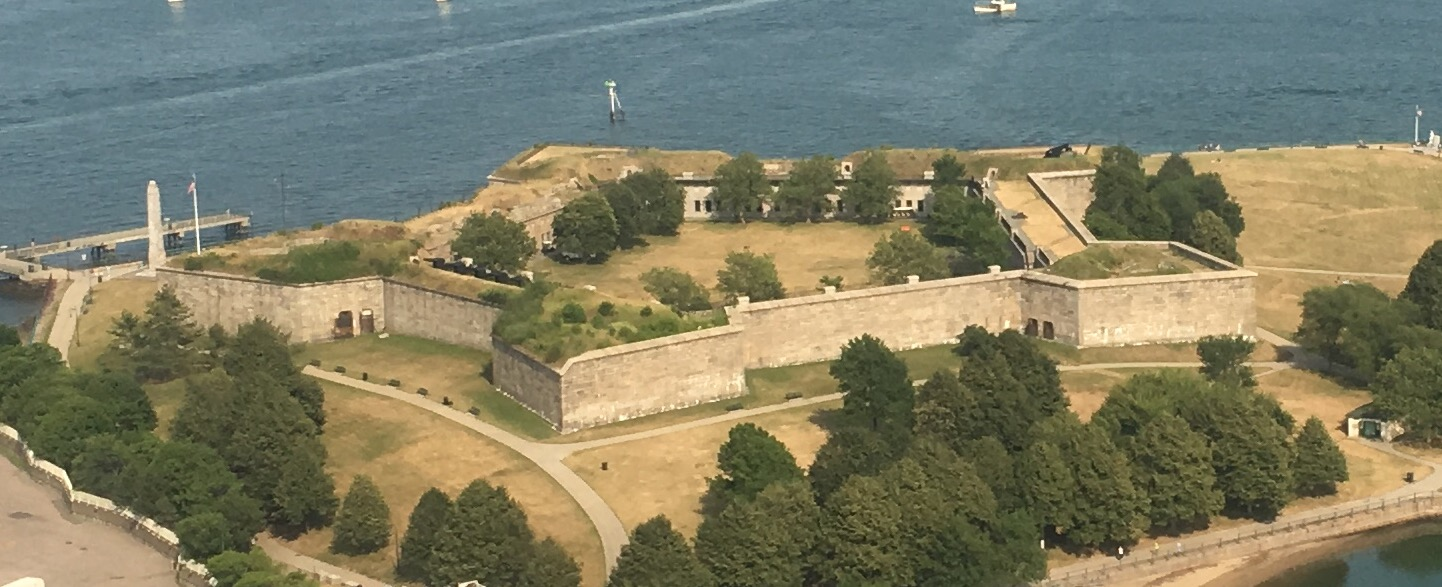
Castle William, the regiment's base during the American War of Independence

The first posting for the 64th in America was Boston, at the time a centre of discontent and an unhappy posting as a result. In 1770 the regiment moved to Halifax, Nova Scotia but in 1772 returned to Boston being stationed at Castle William.

As unrest grew the 64th took place in an incident which lays a claim to the first blood of the American War of Independence being shed in Salem, Massachusetts. On 26 February 1775 a supply of weapons and ammunition was known to be in Salem. The 64th, under their commander Lieutenant Colonel Alexander Leslie, were ordered to seize the weapons. American patriots in Salem were forewarned and tried to prevent the 64th from carrying out their orders. In the scuffle that ensued a local Salem man, Joseph Whicher, was slightly injured by a British bayonet. Negotiations prevented any further bloodshed and the 64th withdrew to Boston, their mission a failure.

When, in March 1776, the British abandoned Boston, the 64th were the last regiment to depart for Halifax, giving them the distinction of being the last British unit to set foot in the Commonwealth of Massachusetts during the war.

Following the reorganisation of the army the 64th, like most regiments, found itself without its flank (grenadier and light infantry) companies which had been detached to form part of the 2nd Grenadier and 2nd Light Infantry Battalions respectively. All three battalions took part in the 1776 capture of New York and the 64th was engaged in the later Battle of Ridgefield.

In 1777 all three units participated in the Philadelphia campaign, taking part in the Battle of Brandywine, the Battle of Paoli and the Battle of Germantown. Remaining in Philadelphia over the winter and into 1778, the 64th and 2nd Grenadier Battalion formed part of the rearguard when Lieutenant-General Clinton evacuated the city in June 1778. Returning to New York, the 64th took part in several small operations. The Light company took part in the skirmish that became known as the Baylor Massacre.

November 1779 saw all the companies of the regiment being transferred to the Southern theatre of operations. In April 1780 the 64th was part of the covering force besieging Charleston, while the grenadier and light companies formed part of the main siege force. After the capture of Charleston, the grenadier and light companies were withdrawn to New York and as Major-General Cornwallis began to advance on Virginia, the 64th remained in Carolina as guard troops. In 1781 the 64th were involved in the Battle of Eutaw Springs and a year later in one of the last actions of the war, the Battle of the Combahee River. The grenadier company was reunited with the 64th but the light company was among the units that surrendered with Cornwallis at Yorktown.

In December 1782 the regiment left America for Jamaica. Back in England, a change occurred in army policy, to hopefully increase recruiting, infantry regiments were given additional territorial titles. The 64th became the 64th (2nd Staffordshire) Foot and began its long association with the city of Lichfield as the depot companies moved there and soon after began to wear the Staffordshire Knot on its uniform.

=== Napoleonic Wars ===
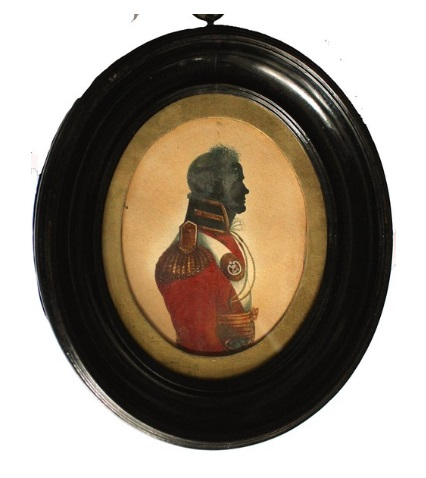
An officer of the 64th (2nd Staffordshire) Regiment of Foot, c.1805

Following the defeat in America, the 64th remained in Jamaica for two years, returning to England in 1783. Four years later the regiment was stationed in Ireland, before sailing once more for the West Indies in 1793 at the outbreak of the Napoleonic Wars. At the end of the Seven Years' War both Martinique and Guadeloupe had been returned to France under the terms of the Treaty of Paris. From Barbados the 64th Foot took part in the invasion of Martinique in early 1794. As before the flank companies were detached from the rest of the regiment but all three elements were involved in the actions in Martinique. This short but successful campaign earned the regiment its second battle honour, Martinique 1794 —although as with the earlier Guadeloupe honour, it was not actually awarded until 1909.

The light and grenadier companies were involved in the capture, shortly afterwards, of St Lucia and the recapture of Guadeloupe. A short period as garrison duty followed and then the regiment returned to England, severely weakened by both losses in battle and sickness, mostly yellow fever. Sir Charles Grey, commander of the British forces in the West Indies, estimated that he had lost 5,000 out of 7,000 troops in less than six months.

The regiment returned to England in 1795, before moving to Gibraltar and then Ireland, where it played a minor part in suppressing the 1798 rebellion. The 64th returned to England in 1800.

Within months the 64th had returned to the West Indies for a campaign of seizing islands held by, variously, France, The Netherlands and Denmark. The first island to fall was the Franco-Dutch island of Saint Martin. This was followed by the Dutch island of St Eustatius and the Danish islands of Saint Thomas, Saint John and Saint Croix. With the signing of the Treaty of Amiens, which restored to France and its allies all territories conquered by the British, the 64th were withdrawn to Barbados. Peace did not last long and in 1803 war with France broke out again. The 64th was immediately in action being part of an expeditionary force that took St Lucia, earning the battle honour St Lucia 1803 — the award of this honour was more timely, it being awarded in 1818. The expedition continued onto the South American mainland with the capture of Dutch held Surinam in 1804. A fourth battle honour, Surinam, was awarded — again in 1818. Garrison duties kept the 64th in Surinam for the next nine years meaning that the regiment played no further part in the Napoleonic Wars.

A move to Halifax, Nova Scotia in 1813 found the 64th providing the funeral guard for James Lawrence, Captain of the USS Chesapeake after the capture of the Chesapeake. In 1815 the regiment returned to Europe to be sent to France as part of the Army of Occupation after the Battle of Waterloo.

=== Years of peace ===
It was to be 1856 before the regiment found itself on active service again. In the interim there had been a short spell in England, a long posting in Gibraltar, several years in Ireland, another six-year tour in the West Indies — where once again fever caused much suffering. These were followed by a short three-year tour in Canada which provided one item of note. On the voyage home two companies, under the command of Captain James Draper, and about 100 women and children were on board the barque Alert when the ship hit a reef about 100 miles out of Halifax. The ship was refloated but in a heavy sea was at risk of sinking and was taking on water. The master of the Alert decided that the only course of action was to beach the vessel but was worried that the ship was becoming top heavy as the troops and their families made for the upper deck. Captain Draper and the troops were persuaded to remain on the troop deck despite the rising water level. The ship was beached on an uninhabited island and all on board were later rescued. The Duke of Wellington Commander-in-chief of the British army directed that the story of Captain Draper's detachment be read out to every regiment and corps in the army as an example of the rewards of steadiness and discipline. The two companies were reunited with the rest of the regiment in England, serving in England and Ireland until being posted to India. Based here until 1856 it saw no active service despite being mobilised as part of a Reserve Field Force in Sindh in 1852.

=== Anglo-Persian War ===
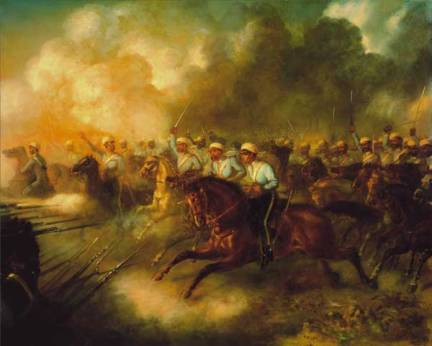
The Battle of Khushab where the regiment saw action in February 1857

War between Britain and Persia broke out in 1856 and the 64th, together with the 20th Bombay Native Infantry, formed the 1st Brigade in the expeditionary force assembled for the campaign. Landing in Persia in late November, the regiment took place in battles at Reshire and Bushire. In 1857 the force advanced inland and defeated the Persian field army at Koosh-Ab on 8 February 1857 while the flank companies were involved in action at Ahwaz. Although hostilities lasted for a little over three months, four battle honours were awarded; Reshire, Bushire, Koosh-Ab and Persia. The 64th were the only British regiment to be awarded all four.

=== Indian Rebellion ===
Following the Persian campaign the 64th returned to India arriving in Bombay only two weeks after the first unrest had occurred in Meerut. The regiment was immediately ordered to take part in the Cawnpore relief force under Major-General Sir Henry Havelock. The relief force did not reach Cawnpore before the city fell under rebel control, a forced march was therefore ordered and the first clash with the rebel forces occurred at Fatehpur. From there a number of skirmishes took place until the force met with the rebels in a significant engagement at Ahwera on 16 July. It was for his actions in this battle that Lieutenant Henry Havelock of the 10th Foot was awarded the Victoria Cross. This award created considerable discontent within the 64th as the citation inferred that it was only due to Lt Havelock's actions that the regiment advanced and achieved its objectives. The matter was referred to Sir Colin Campbell, Commander in Chief, India who upheld the complaint raised and voiced strong criticism of staff officers — Havelock was serving as Aide-de-camp to his father — interfering with regimental officers doing their duty. The relief force entered Cawnpore on 17 July 1857. Subsequently, elements of the regiment played a small part in the relief of Lucknow but the majority of the regiment remained in Cawnpore and it was here that, on 28 November 1857, Drummer Thomas Flinn won the only Victoria Cross awarded to a member of the regiment for tackling two enemy artillerymen despite having been wounded himself. Subsequently, the regiment moved to Fatehgarh and remained there for the rest of the campaign until June 1859 when it returned to Bombay. A single battle honour Lucknow was awarded to the regiment.

=== Final years and amalgamation ===
On return from India in 1861, the regiment spent six years in England, moving to Malta in 1867, then Ireland in 1872. In 1874, as part of the Cardwell Reforms, line infantry battalions were linked in pairs, and the 64th formed a joint depot with the 98th (Prince of Wales's) Regiment of Foot at Limerick. The two regiments were assigned as district no. 20 with a new depot at Whittington Barracks, Staffordshire in 1880. Up to 1879 the 64th was stationed in various parts of the United Kingdom, often performing police duties. The regiment returned to Ireland in 1879, based at Templemore, County Tipperary and it was based here when it was formally amalgamated with the 98th to become the Prince of Wales's (North Staffordshire) Regiment on 1 July 1881.

The regiment was renamed The North Staffordshire (The Prince of Wales's) Regiment in 1920. In 1959 the North Staffordshire and South Staffordshire Regiments amalgamated to form The Staffordshire Regiment (The Prince of Wales's). In September 2007 The Staffordshire Regiment amalgamated with the Cheshire Regiment and the Worcestershire and Sherwood Foresters Regiment to form The Mercian Regiment, in which the Staffords became the 3rd (Staffordshire) Battalion.

The black facings worn by the 64th Foot are today commemorated by the use of black backing to chevrons and rank insignia by all Warrant Officers and Non-commissioned officers of the Mercian Regiment.

== Battle honours ==
Battle honours awarded to the regiment were:

- Guadaloupe 1759, Martinique 1794 (both awarded 1909)
- St. Lucia 1803, Surinam
- Anglo-Persian War: Reshire, Bushire, Koosh-Ab, Persia
- Indian Mutiny: Lucknow

== Colonels of the Regiment ==
Colonels of the Regiment were:

=== 64th Regiment of Foot (1756–1782) ===
- 1758–1759: Maj-Gen. Hon. John Barrington
- 1759: F.M. George Townshend, 1st Marquess Townshend
- 1759–1766: Gen. Hon. George Cary
- 1766–1790: Lt-Gen. John Pomeroy

=== 64th (2nd Staffordshire) Regiment of Foot (1782–1881) ===
- 1790–1808: Gen. John Leland
- 1808: Lt-Gen. William Anne Vilettes
- 1808–1816: Gen. Henry Wynyard
- 1816–1837: Lt-Gen. Sir William Henry Pringle, GCB
- 1837–1855: Gen. Sir Richard Bourke, KCB
- 1855–1867: Gen. Sir James Freeth, KCB, KH
- 1867–1870: Lt-Gen. Henry Keane Bloomfield
- 1870–1881: Gen. Charles Algernon Lewis

== Sources ==
- Commager, Henry Steele & Morris, Richard Brandon, eds. (1967). The Spirit Of Seventy-six (One-Volume ed.). New York: Harper & Row. OCLC 426466.
- Cook, Hugh (1970). The North Staffordshire Regiment (The Prince of Wales's). Famous Regiments. London: Leo Cooper. ISBN 0-85052-056-8.
- Cooper, Dave (2003). Knotted Together. The Staffordshire Regiments: 1705–1919. Vol. 1. Leek, Staffordshire: Churnet Valley Books. ISBN 1-904546-03-X.
- Cooper, Dave (2004). The Scrapbook. The Staffordshire Regiments: 1705–1919. Vol. 2. Leek, Staffordshire: Churnet Valley Books. ISBN 1-904546-10-2.
- Dodd, George (1859). The History of the Indian Revolt. London: W and R Chambers. p. 625.
- Fortescue, John W (1911). A History of the British Army. Vol. 3 (2nd ed.). London: Macmillan. OCLC 10382285.
- Riddick, John F (30 April 2006). The history of British India. Praeger. ISBN 978-0-313-32280-8.
- Rodger, Alexander (2003). Battle Honours of the British Empire and Commonwealth Land Forces 1662–1991. Marlborough, Wiltshire: The Crowood Press. ISBN 1-86126-637-5.
- Sandes, Lt-Col Edward W C (1948). The Indian Sappers and Miners. Chatham, Kent: The Institute of Royal Engineers.
- Swager, Christine R (30 June 2006). The Valiant Died: The Battle of Eutaw Springs September 8, 1781. Westminster, Maryland: Heritage Books. ISBN 978-0-7884-4102-8.
- "Treaty of Amiens, Article III". Research Series:Government and Politics. The Napoleon Series (published 2002). 25 March 1802.
- "Treaty of Paris, Article VIII". The Avalon Project. Yale Law School (published 2008). 10 February 1763.
