= William Pennington (disambiguation) =

William Pennington (1796–1862) was an American politician who served as Governor of New Jersey and Speaker of the House.

William Pennington may also refer to:

- William Sanford Pennington (1757–1826), American politician and judge, father of the above
- William George Pennington, 19th-century Australian politician
- William Henry Pennington (1833-1923), British soldier and actor
- William Pennington (businessman) (1923–2011), American casino executive
