= John McNamara =

John McNamara or Macnamara may refer to:

== Politics ==
- John Macnamara (MP), MP for Leicester in the 1780s
- John McNamara (Australian politician) (fl. 1850s), New South Wales politician
- John Macnamara (1905–1944), British Army officer and politician
- John McNamara, mayor of Rockford, Illinois (1981–89)

== Sports ==
- John J. McNamara (author) (1932–1986), banker, author and Olympic sailor
- John McNamara (baseball) (1932–2020), American baseball manager
- Jackie McNamara Sr. (born 1952), Scottish footballer
- Jackie McNamara (born 1973), Scottish footballer
- JT McNamara (1975–2016), Irish steeplechase jockey

== Others ==
- John J. McNamara (1876–1941), one of the McNamara brothers who bombed the office of the Los Angeles Times in 1910
- John Michael McNamara (1878–1960), American clergyman of the Roman Catholic Church
- John McNamara (VC) (1887–1918), recipient of the Victoria Cross
- John J. McNamara (architect) (fl. 1930s–1960s), American theater architect
- John Leo McNamara (1922–2004), Australian bushman, poet, historian and author
- John R. McNamara (1927–2001), U.S. Navy officer and Catholic bishop
- John McNamara (artist) (born 1950), American artist
- John McNamara (sportswriter) (1961/2–2018), sports reporter killed in the Capital Gazette shooting
- John McNamara (writer) (born 1962), co-creator of Profit
- John McNamara (fraudster) (fl. 1980s–1990s), Long-Island car dealer convicted of defrauding GMAC
- John McNamara (mathematical biologist), English mathematical biologist
