= James Freeth =

British Army general (1786–1867)

General Sir James Freeth KCB KH
- Born: 5 March 1786; Edgbaston, Warwickshire
- Died: 19 January 1867 (aged 80); London, England
- Military career
- Allegiance: United Kingdom
- Branch: British Army
- Service years: 1806–1867
- Rank: General
- Unit: Royal Staff Corps
- Commands: Quartermaster-General to the Forces
- Conflicts: Napoleonic Wars; Peninsular War; Battle of Fuentes de Oñoro; Siege of Ciudad Rodrigo; Siege of Badajoz; Battle of Salamanca; Siege of Burgos; Battle of Vitoria; Battle of the Pyrenees; Battle of Nivelle; Battle of the Nive
- Awards: Military General Service Medal

General Sir James Freeth KCB KH (5 March 1786 – 19 January 1867) was Quartermaster-General to the Forces.

== Military career ==
Freeth was commissioned into the 98th Regiment of Foot in 1806. He served in the Peninsular War and in France from 1809 to 1814 and, in 1851, was appointed Quartermaster-General to the Forces. He became colonel of the 64th Regiment of Foot in 1855.

He was promoted lieutenant-general in 1858 and full general in 1865.

== Family ==
He married Harriett Holt and together they went on to have six sons and two daughters. Three of his sons became major-generals; his great-grandchild, Francis Arthur Freeth, was a chemist who developed a number of processes in explosives manufacture and a major in the Territorial Army. Another of his great-grandchildren, George Douglas Freeth Junior, renewed interest in surfing in Hawaii at the turn of the twentieth century, helped popularize the sport in California beginning in 1907, and created the foundation of Southern California's lifeguard service.

Military offices
Preceded by Sir James Gordon	Quartermaster-General to the Forces; 1851–1855	Succeeded by Sir Richard Airey
Preceded by Sir Richard Bourke	Colonel of the 64th (2nd Staffordshire) Regiment of Foot; 1855–1867	Succeeded by Sir Henry Keane Bloomfield
