= Dunmore House =

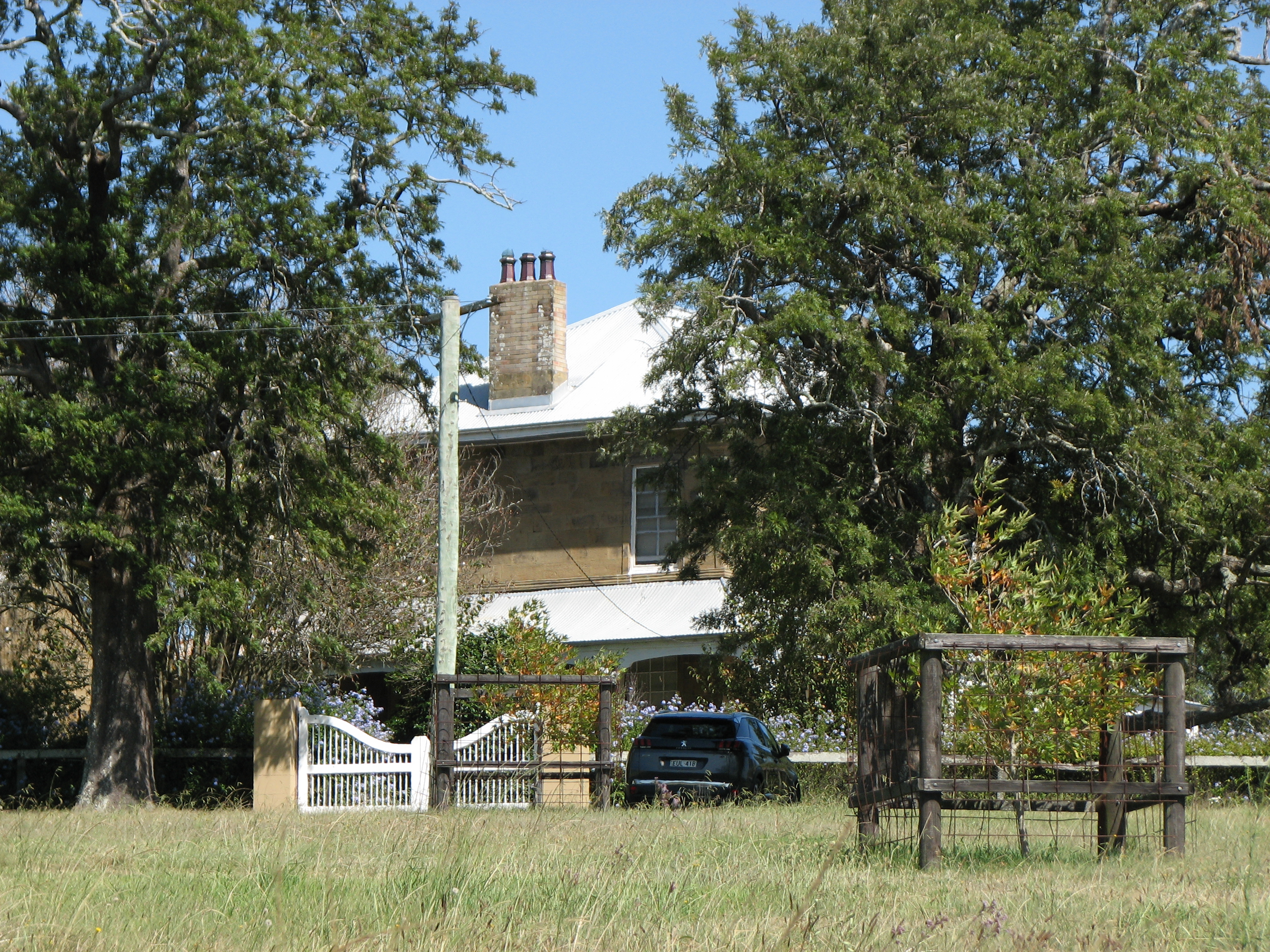
- Dunmore House, Paterson Road, Bolwarra Heights, NSW

- Location within New South Wales Location within Australia
- 32.6862°S 151.5993°E
- Location: 557 Paterson Road, Bolwarra Heights, New South Wales, Australia

History
- Built: 1830–1833

New South Wales Heritage Register
- Official name: Dunmore House
- Type: state heritage (built)
- Designated: 16 August 2012
- Reference no.: 1887
- Type: Homestead building
- Category: Residential buildings (private)
- Builders: William and Andrew Lang

Dunmore House is a heritage-listed residence at 557 Paterson Road, Bolwarra Heights, in the Hunter Valley of New South Wales, Australia. It was built from 1830 to 1833 by William and Andrew Lang. It was added to the New South Wales State Heritage Register on 16 August 2012.

== History ==
=== Lang family's emigration to New South Wales ===
William Lang of Greenock in Scotland, was a wood merchant specialising in block making, coopering and ship's joinery. He married Mary Dunmore and four children were born to them:

- John Dunmore, born August, 1799.
- George Dunmore, born 1801.
- Andrew, born 1804.
- Isabella Ninian, born 1806.

In 1806, William retired from business and settled on the farm, Nethra Dochra near Largs (Scotland), which his wife had inherited.

The Laird, Colonel Thomas Brisbane, who was later to be knighted and become Governor of New South Wales, negotiated to purchase Dochra from the Langs for £800, but the purchase fell through and the Langs remained on the farm.

John entered Glasgow University at the age of 12. After 8 years he graduated with a Master of Arts degree, later completing his Doctorate in Divinity.

George commenced his studies in Medicine, but was offered a glamorous position of superintendent of a large sugar plantation at Lucia in the West Indies. However, his patron was killed just before George left, putting George's future in jeopardy. His brother, John, wrote to his friend Captain Piper in New South Wales regarding a career in the new country for his brother. As a result, on 24 April 1821, George sailed from London for Hobart on the Brixton under Captain Lush. He arrived in Hobart in the following August. He then proceeded to Sydney arriving 16 September 1821, a few months before Sir Thomas Brisbane was to arrive to relieve Lachlan Macquarie of his position as governor.

John Dunmore Lang left for New South Wales at the urging of his brother George, to raise the moral tone of the colony. He sailed from Leith on 14 October 1822 on the Andromeda under Captain James Muddle. Most of his fellow travellers were settlers with grants and some were already agriculturalists.

The two elder boys now being so far away from the family, those of the immediate family remaining is Scotland, chose to emigrate also. In 1823, the Lang family, comprising William and Mary and their children Andrew and Isabella, accompanied by one female servant, who travelled steerage at a cost of £40, left Leith aboard the vessel Greenock.

They were greeted on arrival at Campbell's wharf by their older sons. The Brisbanes also welcomed them, with William being offered a grant of 2000 acres, and pledging to take 20 convicts. Of these, he received four. William and Andrew began work as builders in the rapidly developing town of Sydney, a logical extension of his father's trade in Scotland.

=== Securing the Land Grant and the establishment of Dunmore ===
On his arrival in Sydney, George Lang obtained a job in the mercantile house of Riley and Walker through the goods offices of Deputy Commissary, General William Wemyss (in whose house John was to board when he arrived in Sydney). Later, George moved to Parramatta where he joined the Commissariat Department.

He had been a conscientious worker, not having given time to the development of his land grants and in one case, not having even made a selection of land.

George did not have a Home Governor's Order for land. However, he applied for a grant of land on 5 March 1822 and he was granted an initial 1000 acres (424 ha) from Governor Macquarie, adjacent Standish Harris' land. The site he chose was between the future villages of Largs and Paterson. He later purchased an additional 600 ha and named the property Dunmore. Cecily Mitchell ascribes the naming of Dunmore to William Lang's wife's maiden name, Mary Dunmore. This is verified in an implicit way in John Dunmore Lang's History of New South Wales.

Conditions applicable to the grant included the following:

- George Lang was not to sell within five years.
- The government reserved the right to take out timber deemed fit for naval purposes.
- And that grant "procure and have assigned to him 10 convicts who were to be clothed and fed until the expiration or remission of their respective sentences." The convicts were to be used exclusively on the grant of land.

Tragically, George Lang died in 1825, in Sydney, aged 23. The property was inherited by his elder brother, Dr John Dunmore Lang, who became the first Presbyterian minister in the colony. Dr Lang was unable to remain at Dunmore and the estate passed to his younger brother Andrew. Andrew supposedly paid 5/- (shillings) for the property. J. D. Lang in his account says that he was in England at the time of his brother's death, and that the land "consequently fell to my younger brother, Andrew Lang."

Dunmore House was built by Andrew and his father William. It was possibly commenced in 1827 and completed in 1830. These dates are quoted differently in many references, ranging from a commencement in 1830 to a completion in 1833. J. D. Lang writes that his brother took possession of the land in 1826, but "as he had to reside in Sydney the whole of that year, he entrusted it to the management of an emancipated convict overseer, who proved a very inefficient servant, and did very little in the way of improving it."

Historical Records of Australia give an account of Andrew's later representations to the Governor to acquire further lands. He wrote to Governor Bourke from Dunmore, Hunter's River, 30 April 1832 explaining that his brother George Lang arrived in the colony as a free settler in 1821, and that he, Andrew, as an heir to his brother's estate, was claiming 400 acres of land that had been offered to his brother from Governor Macquarie, but had not been selected by his brother. Governor Brisbane, to whom George had been well known, had granted George a further 1000 acres. Andrew explained that until 1824, his brother had been employed in His Majesty's Service as a store keeper in the Commissariat Department and was unable to leave his station and go in search of land. He left the Department on 24 December 1824 to settle on his land at Hunter's River, then died in 1825. The recorded reasons vary. He "was seized with an inflammatory fever...of which he died on 18th January 1825" (in Sydney) according to one record. In Cynthia Hunter's work "The Settlers of Paterson's Plains" wherein George Lang is said to have drowned in the wreck of a sailing coaster between Sydney and Newcastle in January 1825.

In April 1827, Andrew was seeking to secure further lands comprising 400 acres immediately adjacent to his 1000 acres property, Dunmore. In the meantime, this land had been claimed by Mr George Sparke in August 1831. Lang wrote and warned him to "desist from improving it in any way until the case was referred to (the Governor)."

Governor Richard Bourke wrote to Viscount Goderich in Despatch number 73 (per ship Rubicon) in relation to this matter. This correspondence was acknowledged by the Right Honourable E. G. Stanley on 15 April 1833. The request of both Andrew Lang, as well as Mrs Lang, whom had also applied, was not accepted. Andrew Lang wanted alternative land, if he could not obtain the 400 acre adjacent parcel of land. The influence of Reverend Dr Lang was impetus enough for Governor Bourke to look further toward a positive answer.

In reply the Right Honourable E. G. Stanley wrote: "The application of Mr Andrew Lang to be allowed to benefit by the Order for 500 acres, given by Governor Macquarie (sic) to his late brother, is totally inadmissible."

Standish Lawrence Harris had 2000 acres adjacent to Lang's grant. In 1825, he purchased 1114 acres which he named Goulburn Grove. This gave him an area of land from the banks of the Paterson River (Phoenix Park) to the Hunter River adjoining Maitland Vale north of the city of Maitland. Harris became insolvent in 1833 and his properties were put up for auction in 1835. Andrew Lang purchased 1400 acres (556.560ha) for 24/- an acre. He estimated that it cost five to six pounds an acre to clear the impenetrable brush containing huge forest trees (the land was also still heavily wooded along the Paterson River). This gave him a large and superb estate with five miles of river frontage.

J. D. Lang describes the property;

"My deceased brother's grant...-consisted partly of a belt of heavily timbered alluvial land, extending about a mile and a half in length along the windings of the river, which at that part of its course and for several miles higher up is both deep and broad-sufficiently so indeed for the largest vessels-although towards the ocean, which is about 40 miles distant by water, there are shallows which large vessels could not get over. Beyond the belt of alluvial land, there are two large lagoons, nearly parallel to the course of the river, the frequent resort of innumerable wild ducks, and occasionally pelicans and black swans. The beds and banks of the lagoons consist of the richest alluvial soil, the rest of the farm being good forest pasture land, very lightly timbered."

=== Settling Dunmore ===
Just prior to moving north, the Langs sold some of their furniture, and the following advertisement appeared in The Australian:

"To be sold by Public Auction at the residence of Messrs. William and Andrew Lang builders Elizabeth Street, on Wednesday December 29th, 1824, an elegant assortment of Spanish mahogany furniture as follows: 1 set of Dining Tables 14' long; 4 Pembroke Tables; 1 Card Table; 2 Tea Tables;1 Ladies work table; 2 Chests of Drawers with wardrobe; Post and tent bedsteads etc., etc."

Andrew and his father William took possession of the property on the Paterson River in 1825, but did not settle the land until 1826. "The settlement of the Scots Church in Sydney having been attended with much greater difficulty and expense than was anticipated, and certain influential Scotsmen in the colony having rather augmented than diminished the burden that was thus entailed on its friends, my relatives had been induced to make common cause with myself, in bringing whatever capital and credit they could command in the colony to bear upon the ultimate accomplishment of that object. My brother was consequently left with comparatively little capital to commence upon his land."

Not only did they build the church, but the Langs had also to contribute their own monies for the completion of the church.

By his brother's account, Andrew Lang was a frugal man, who instead of following the trend of the surrounding landowners in mortgaging their properties and purchasing sheep and cattle, "he remained satisfied with the few that he possessed, and determined not to buy more until he could pay for them."

"Prepare thy work without, and make it fit for thyself in the field; and afterwards build thine house." Proverbs XXIV 27. Andrew Lang's method of going about establishment of the property, was scriptural according to J D Lang, when he drew on this verse to exemplify an object lesson of good stewardship. He put forward the development of Dunmore as a good example of this passage in action. He and his family were all given to take evangelistic opportunities.

By 1827, some dwelling had been erected at Dunmore, as Mrs Lang had furniture made by Quong and Tchion, cabinetmakers of Sydney. This was as J. D. Lang described the property: "The first dwelling erected was formed of rough slabs of split timber, the lower ends of which were sunk in the ground, the upper brought together in a wall plate. It was thatched with reeds or coarse grass, and contained three apartments-a parlour or sitting room, a store room, and a bedroom, each of which served a number of different purposes as required. The kitchen was detached, and was inhabited by a convict servant and his wife. The bare ground served as the floor, and the gaps between the vertical slabs were grouted with a composition of mud, to form a plaster. The walls were white washed inside and out. It was fitted with glass windows and a timber floor at a later stage. It served as the farmhouse for three or four years."

By 1830, with the aid of convict labour, they had erected two stone buildings incorporating a barn and granary, dairy, kitchen and store. The two stone pavilions were later used as outbuildings upon completion of the two storey stone residence, which formed the next phase in the establishment of the Dunmore buildings. The wooden buildings were given up to the farm overseer. In the interim period, these stone buildings were fitted up and used as a second temporary residence (from JD Lang's account). These buildings are still standing and after significant reconstruction and stabilisation, are in use today, and form two sides of a quadrangle behind the main house.

J. D. Lang goes on to describe the final residence, adjoining the out buildings "...on an elevated and commanding situation, between the two lagoons, and about half a mile from the river. It is a two story(sic) house, built of hewn stone, having a verandah or covered portico all around." That the rear (south) single storey flanking walls are completed in ruled render, would be accounted for by the fact of the verandah running around the whole house originally. It is therefore likely that the southern verandah was closed in to form a store room off the kitchen and a laundry at a later time. The turned balusters in the now roofed parapet of the south east and southwest flanking rooms are not explained in Lang's account. It is assumed that the rooms were a later addition. Also, as the stone pavilions were constructed prior to the main house, with direct reference to the detail and quality of stone work on the north facade, it would appear that the dressed facing stones are an applique or veneer, applied when the stonework for the main house was being cut and dressed, and as a final aesthetic touch to relate the earlier buildings to the newer homestead in their detail and outward presentation. Symmetry and congruency of detail are important elements in the Colonial Georgian style of building.

In the Sydney Gazette of 9 January 1828, W. and A. Lang advertised that they were going to erect a flourmill on Paterson's River. It would appear that the mill was ultimately run by the husband of Isabella, Robert Muir.

From Robert Muir's diary, he went to Largs on 2 August 1838 at three thirty bound for Plymouth. On 15 September 1838 the steamer Juno left for Plymouth. It arrived at 11pm on 16 September. He arrived in Sydney Tuesday 15 January 1839.

On Sunday 21 June 1840 he went to Maitland arriving in the afternoon. On Monday 22 JUne he visited Dunmore where he remained all day. He again visited Dunmore on Thursday 25 June, staying until Friday 26 June. Conjecturally one would conclude that he met Isabella Ninian Lang on this occasion, leading ultimately to their subsequent marriage in Scots Church, Sydney on 8 July 1845.

Muir's mill operated on the banks of the Paterson River at Woodville. Four masted barques came up the Paterson to Woodville to procure flour from Mitchell's flour mills. An old boiler-probably a ship's boiler- was to be seen until recently (1947) and still may be, in a creeper covered building on the water's brink, where the old punt used to be. In this building, the first flour mill worked by steam was erected by Mr Robert Muir. Later on the mill changed hands.

The road to the Paterson River was diverted from its original route as indicated as a "Sufferance Road" on the accompanying map, to make straighter and more direct approaches to the new bridge, constructed in 1864 or 1865. Until then the road passed far closer to Dunmore House than it does now present, skirting the crown of the ridge upon which the house stands, and leading to the punt that was located to the west of the present position of Dunmore Bridge.

This would explain the definition of gate positions on the eastern side of the immediate house yard, and the presence of the stand of giant bamboo in its position to the southeast of the house, a feature that designated an entry point in properties of the day.

=== The Midlothian immigrants ===
One of the most important and indeed controversial phases in the growth of land settlement at Dunmore, was the arrival of the highland settlers who travelled to New South Wales on the Midlothian. During 1837, Dr J. Lang commenced his Bounty Scheme for bringing out to Australia carefully selected (described as upright Calvinist highlanders) Scottish and some Irish migrant families. The scheme continued through until 1852. It had a considerable effect on the development of society and religious values in the colonies. Amongst the Scots who settled on the Paterson at Dunmore were the Beatons, Campbells, Gillies, McKay, McLeod, McKinnons, McWilliams, McShaws, McLennans, McRaes, Munros, Shaws, Grants and Grahams. A great many of them were highlanders from the Isle of Skye, refugees from the Highland Clearances.

The following is from G. S. Munro's essay on J. D. Lang.

"Much has been said (not least by Lang himself!) about the arrival of the Scots Mechanics on the Stirling Castle in 1831. But let us look at a lesser know(sic) episode which illustrates Lang's evangelical activism in the area of immigration, and again raises questions about possible mixed motives."

The barque Midlothian entered Sydney Heads on 12 December 1837. The passengers disembarked the next day. It was the third ship of twenty in Lang's Bounty Scheme. Bounty ships gave assisted passage to 4000 Scots between 1837-40. The second, William Nicol, arrived in Sydney a week before the Midlothian. Lang himself arrived back from England at the same time on the "Portland". A week after arriving, the Midlothian passengers attended the first Gaelic speaking church service in Australia, at Scots Church. They refused to be split up as the first shipload had been, and demanded to be settled as a community, with their clergyman, William McIntyre. They presented a petition through Lang and McIntyre "representing that they had been induced to emigrate by the hope held out to them of being enabled to settle in one neighbourhood, so as to be within reach of religious ordinances administered in their native language, the only one understood by four fifths of their number, and praying that facilities to enable them to do so might be granted by the Government". (FN57)

The Executive Council had an emergency meeting, and decided that even though no such undertaking had been given, the Highlanders should be allowed to settle together, if any large landowner could be found who would accept them as a body. The government would give them free passage and supplies for six months.

Rather suspiciously, the landowner willing to take them was Lang's brother, Andrew, who ran the family property of Dunmore. It is hard not to wonder whether Lang orchestrated the whole affair so that Andrew could establish twenty families of tenant farmers on his property at the Government's expense.

FN 59 goes onto say that "Governor Gipps was not at all happy about the situation, as expressed in his despatch to Glenelg of 20th July, 1838...considerable dissatisfaction has been expressed in this Colony at the manner in which a number of Emmigrants [from] the ship "Midlothian" were disposed of, they having been settled as a Body and thus become occupiers of land on their own account, instead of being forced to work for wages as farm labourers. One suspects the "considerable dissatisfaction" was felt by other landed gentry deprived of the opportunity to exploit these new migrants and jealous of Andrew Lang's windfall."

Added to the above sentiments, Harry Boyle writes in his publication Historic Largs Village "John Eales came to the government's aid and offered to take them. Before accepting, they sent two of their number to inspect the property, which they reported, was subject to flooding. The group said they would not accept. They settled on Goulburn Grove, which had now become part of the Dunmore Estate."

The village that began to form, probably as flood free place to build homes and to accommodate the services needed for this large group, was named Dunmore. This name was retained until the death of Emily Lang in 1889 when the name adopted was Largs.

Within the private village, a National School was built in 1838 as a school/church for the Presbyterians, on land provided by the Langs, to educate the children of the tenant farmers, approximately 60 families and to be used as a Presbyterian Kirk on Sundays. St Andrews Presbyterian Kirk was built in 1846 and remained the only church for some time to come.

=== The character of Dunmore ===
In 1827, John Dunmore Lang visited Dunmore describing the journey and the character. Forty miles from the mouth of the Hunter, 70 miles north of Sydney. It was hard riding over 110 miles of rugged mountainous countryside, via Wollombi, where he was forced to sleep out for two nights. If he travelled by boat, he still took several days on the journey, as the boat trip ended at the mouth of the river (Paterson) and he had to be rowed upriver by two boat men, which all meant delay, fatigue, annoyance and expense.

He wrote that Dunmore Estate was "250 acres-4 square miles, 1500 acres of alluvial land, 300 acres of wheat, worked by 40 convicts under an overseer. The land was let in small farms of 20 to 150 acres for 10/- to 20/- per acre per annum."

Lang describes there being 300 souls on the property. There was a 14 horsepower mill, the Presbyterian Church, the National Board School, with 76 pupils, of whom but 30 were of the tenantry. Grain was grown for the Sydney market. In 1830, Dr Lang commented on the advisability of growing tobacco in the district, after his father had pointed out to him indigenous tobacco growing in the bed of the dried up lagoon. It was he who suggested the cultivation of cotton, and he was a strong advocate for the cultivation of the grape. Historical Records of Australia shows that German immigrant vinedressers were brought to Dunmore for the purpose of caring for the vineyards in the 1840s.

The grape crop yielded 1800 gallons of wine in 1849 under the supervision of George Schmid. The property was famous for its vineyards in its early days. Grapes still grow in the southern courtyard. Whether these are black Hamburgh, remnant of Schmid's time is not known.

The grapes grew on the alluvial flats of the Paterson. In 1850, Andrew Lang had eight acres planted. Grapes were sold on site as well as being taken to the Maitland Fruit Market, as well as wine being produced.

Initially, Andrew established a small dairy establishment with the cattle he already possessed, and agricultural operations were commenced on the alluvial flat. The dairy was managed by a tenant family, with the produce being regularly sent to market in Sydney "to meet the various items of expenditure incurred in the maintenance of the other convict-servants on the farm."

The convict labour was employed in felling and burning off trees for land clearing operations and cultivation, or in grubbing up the roots of those that had been already felled; in ploughing, sowing, reaping, threshing and grinding wheat; in planting, hoeing, pulling, and threshing Indian corn. About one hundred and fifty acres of heavily timbered land had been cleared and cultivated in this way.

In 1832, about eighty acres of land was under wheat and another eighty acres was under maize. The wheat was ground into flour and sold as flour in Maitland. The maize was either shipped to Sydney or used in the feeding of horses, or in fattening pigs and poultry on the farm.

Potatoes and tobacco was also grown for sale as well as for consumption on the farm.

During the summer months, the dairy produce was cheese, which was sold in Sydney by the hundred-weight or the ton. For the rest of the year, butter was produced for shipping fresh to Sydney every week by steam-boat and sold at market. The quantity per week was in the order of 70 to 100 pounds.

In 1832, when the cattle herd had increased to 3400 head, he purchased a flock of fine wool sheep. These were sent, together with his horses and cattle to his property some 30 miles distant to form a grazing station under the management of a hired overseer.

A garden comprising fruit trees had earlier been destroyed through floods, so a second orchard was established beyond the reach of flood waters, together with a vineyard. To the northwest of the house is a steep cliff. Described in the Newcastle and Hunter District Historical Society article relating to a visit to the house in 1946;

"A walk down one of the fields led to an unexpected change of altitude. The ground level ended abruptly in a line of heard rocks, the edges straight and clean as if sliced out by a gigantic knife. Immediately below was an orchard with some of the trees bearing blossoms. Between there and the river smooth acres of cultivation lay like a patchwork quilt. Miss Swan, of Lemon Grove, remembers her mother saying that this land had been known in Andrew Lang's time to have 18 feet of water on it."

There is no orchard remaining in this location on the property.

=== The Lang family ===
William Lang, aged 52 (the patriarch) was drowned in 1840 while travelling from Newcastle to Sydney in a small coastal vessel. Cecily Mitchell puts his death in April 1830 and offers the following description of the circumstances surrounding his death:

"William Lang was to make a visit to Sydney to attend the May meeting of the Sydney College Committee. He could not get a berth on the usual packet so accepted passage on a very small vessel. During the night a southerly gale blew up, the vessel wrecked and William was drowned."

In the Weekly Register, 10 August 1844: " DEATH: On 5th inst. At the residence of her son, Mr Andrew Lang, of Dunmore, Hunter's River, in the 75th year of her age, Mrs Mary Dunmore Lang, relict of Mr William Lang of Sydney, and mother of Dr. Lang."

Andrew Lang married Emily Caswell in Maitland Presbyterian Church on 8 November 1849 at the age of 45. Emily Caswell was from the nearby property of Ballicara. Emily, daughter of Lieutenant William Caswell, was 23. There was one child to this marriage, said to have been a son, who died at birth in June 1851. After this occurrence, they returned to England settling in Devonshire.

Andrew returned to sell Dunmore and his other properties. Andrew returned to his English home, also called Dunmore, dying in London on 3 June 1874.

Emily died in Devonshire on 17 October 1889, aged 63.

Isabella Ninian Muir died as a result of childbirth on 20 June 1847, leaving a two month old baby, John Sibbald Muir, born 11 April 1847. He died unmarried at the age of 27 in August 1874, as a result of falling from a horse.

Robert Muir, Isabella's husband died on 1 July 1851, leaving the child of nearly 5 years of age, parentless.

The Reverend Doctor John Dunmore Lang was the founder and minister of Scots Church Sydney, between 1826 and 1878, when he died aged 79.

In the property to the east of Dunmore lay a tomb, bearing the inscription:

Sacred to the Memory of
Mary Dunmore Lang
Isabella Ninian Muir
Robert Muir
Infant Child of Emily and Andrew Lang

=== Later owners of Dunmore ===
Joseph Pearce, of "Edinglassie" near Muswellbrook, who owned other properties near Denman and Jerry's Plains, bought Dunmore in 1872, then a 490 ha property. He subdivided the property into four small farms, which were let to tenant farmers, keeping the house on a block of six hectares.

A few years later, when Pearce retired to Armidale, the property was sold to Henry Trenchard, a West Maitland bank manager on Saturday 30 October 1886.

The Warden family, Arthur and Amy of Paterson, purchased "Dunmore House" in 1892. They kept it for 18 years until Arthur's death, when Amy moved to Sydney.

John Graham, born 1843, apparently in the kitchen of Dunmore House, purchased the property in 1910 and died there in 1932. The property passed onto William, his son. In 1954, William's eldest son, Malcolm, bought out his brother's interests and embarked on a much needed renovation of the property, before taking up residence in 1965 with his wife, Elizabeth. The residency ended with Elizabeth's death in 1999. The property was occupied by the Graham family for 90 years, until it was sold to Paris and Mittie Osborne in 2000.

Paris and Mittie Osborne have made a significant contribution to the repair and reconstruction of the two flanking outbuildings to the south east and south west of the two storey homestead. These buildings were in a state of partial collapse when they purchased the property. The stone work has been dismantled and relaid on new footings. The roofs having been maintained in their original line and position through supplementary support during reconstruction. The outbuildings have become viable residential and potential hospitality resources, ensuring these important elements in the group remain intact and serviceable condition.

== Description ==
The buildings are prominently located on a ridge line overlooking the Paterson River and Dunmore Bridge at Woodville, to the north and has sight line to other principal properties along the river alignment from Mindariba to Wallalong.

It is an identifiable group of buildings from the north, south and eastern approaches to the site, and has a prominent stand of Giant cane marking the historical entry to the building group.

Dunmore House and its site consists of four principal buildings forming four sides of a quadrangle in which a water cistern and old grapevine covered pergola are located along the centre line subtended between the vertical slab barn to the south and the two storey stone residence to the north.

The main homestead is a large two storey residence which commenced construction in 1830 and was completed by 1833. It displays the symmetry of a classical Georgian (Regency) building. A flagged verandah enclosed in part extends around all four sides. Original columns replaced earlier this century by unsympathetic posts with Art Nouveau brackets detail. Sash windows and door openings have a raised stone surround. The interiors, consisting of four rooms on two levels, are largely intact featuring fine cedar joinery and an original cantilevered stone staircase off the central ground floor entrance hall.

Forming a courtyard at the rear are two single storey stone outbuildings, which predate the main house, dating from the 1820s. The eastern outtbuilding was formerly a stable, with stone flagged flooring, and a wine cellar and larder. The western building formerly functioned as a bakehouse, bread oven, kitchen and laundry, with a workshop to the north. It is understood that the eastern building was the earliest of the stone outbuildings to be constructed, with the western building following; being utilised by the Langs as a temporary residence during the construction of the main residence.

=== Condition ===
Work in refurbishment and reconstruction of the two southern pavilions commenced in 2002. Since the reconstruction of the stonework of the two southern pavilions and the adaptive reuse of these structures as guest rooms and Laundry (western pavilion) and barn and entertainment area (east pavilion) the condition is now excellent. Before these conservation works, the northern exterior walls were badly cracked, the west pavilion west wall was in a state of partial collapse, the bread oven was beyond repair, the timber lintels over openings were badly deteriorated and infested with white ants, the render that had been applied to the field stone walls to east, west and south walls of each pavilion were badly fretted, the mortar had all but disappeared and the walls were crumbling. This has all been rectified. The roof has been reclad, but was held in its original position and form while the stone work was relaid.

The two storey residence has been retained in much the same manner as it was when purchased by the present owners. Stone flagging on the verandah has been raised and relaid in its original configuration. Reroofing has been undertaken on the verandah.

Trees in close proximity to the house, that were jeopardising the stability of the building, were removed.

Geotechnical investigation was carried out in the courtyard formed by the house and two outer pavilions. This was found to be fill material to a depth of approximately 600mm. There may be archaeological potential in the surrounding area. Sections of the original dressed stone from the pavilions and collapsed stone chimneys post 1989 earthquake, had been used as garden edging. Some of these elements have been able to be refixed in their original position. The chimneys were rebuilt in brickwork post earthquake, and have not been subject of further intervention.

=== Modifications and dates ===
c. 1827 Original construction of a vertical slab dwelling as temporary accommodation during the construction of the two stone outbuildings. The location of this structure is not determined. In 1827, the original building consisted of three apartments–a parlour or sitting room, a store room and a bedroom and was constructed from vertical slabs of split timber.

During this time frame, the detached kitchen was built consisting of bare ground for the floor, a composition of mud to block the gaps between the vertical slabs for the walls. At a later stage these walls were white washed inside and out and were also fitted with glass windows and the original bare floor was lined with timber. This kitchen served as a farm house for 3–4 years.

c. 1829 two stone buildings were erected incorporating a barn, granary, a dairy, a kitchen and a store room. These two stone buildings were used as outbuildings upon completion of the two storey stone residence. Construction of the outbuildings and use as temporary accommodation during the construction of the principal two storey residence.

In 1830, construction of the two storey residence had begun and the two stone buildings were later used as outbuildings upon the completion of the two-storey stone residence. These stone buildings are still standing and form two sides of a quadrangle behind the main house.

1833 completion of construction of the quadrangle behind the main house.

Around this time, the original wooden buildings consisting of the three apartments and detached kitchen were given up to the farm overseer.

1890 (circa) Kitchen additions to the western outbuilding

== Heritage listing ==
Dunmore House represents a fine and early example of a convict-built Colonial Georgian homestead complex dating from c.1833. The Georgian property maintains links to the earliest establishment of the New South Wales colony in the Hunter region. It represents the early settlement and farming practices of the colony, as well the colony's early connections to the Presbyterian Church, evangelism, Scotland and Scottish migration.

Dunmore House has strong associations with the colony's first Presbyterian Minister, the Reverend John Dunmore Lang. The land was granted to, built on and used as the principal residence for his brother's family, as recorded in Lang's journals. John Dunmore Lang was an active proponent for moral reform in the young colony and served as a member of the New South Wales Legislative Assembly. Lang was instrumental in establishing the Presbyterian Church and education in the colony, including successfully agitating for British funding for building churches for this faith. Scots Church in Sydney was largely funded by the Lang family through income derived from farming this estate.

Dunmore House is also closely associated with John Dunmore Lang's significant endeavours for promoting early Scottish migration to the colony during the early to mid-19th century, which influenced the development of society and religious values in the early colony, as well as the development of early Australian industries such as viticulture. From 1837 to 1852 Lang's pioneering Bounty migration scheme provided assisted passage to Scottish, German and Irish settlers who were carefully selected to inject religious values into the colony as well as much needed trades and skills. Dunmore House has direct associations with this migration scheme as the destination point, place of settlement and work for many of the Scottish migrants imported through this scheme.

Dunmore House provides evidence of two forms of early colonial settlement - in its use of convict labour under private assignment for constructing the buildings and farming the estate, as well as the migration, settlement and use of skilled free settlers mostly from Scotland and Germany for farming the estate and establishing a society modelled, it seems, on Scotland.

Dunmore House is likely to have social significance to members of the Scots Church in Sydney, the Presbyterian community and present-day descendants of the early German, Scottish and Irish settlers who Lang was responsible for shipping out to the Colony and who settled at and worked for the Lang family on the Dunmore House estate.

Dunmore House was listed on the New South Wales State Heritage Register on 16 August 2012 having satisfied the following criteria.

The place is important in demonstrating the course, or pattern, of cultural or natural history in New South Wales.

The convict-built and operated Georgian property maintains links to the earliest establishment of the New South Wales colony in the Hunter region. It represents the early settlement and farming practices of the Colony, as well the colony's early connections to the Presbyterian Church, evangelism, Scotland and Scottish migration.

The place has a strong or special association with a person, or group of persons, of importance of cultural or natural history of New South Wales's history.

Dunmore House has strong associations with the colony's first Presbyterian Minister, the Reverend John Dunmore Lang. The land was granted to, built for, and used as, the principal residence for his brother's family, as recorded in Lang's journals. John Dunmore Lang was an active proponent for moral reform in the young colony and served as a Member of Parliament. Lang was instrumental in establishing the Presbyterian Church and education in the colony, including successfully agitating for British funding for building churches for this faith. Scots Church in Sydney was largely funded by the Lang family through income derived from farming this estate.

Dunmore House is also closely associated with John Dunmore Lang's significant endeavours for promoting early Scottish migration to the colony during the early to mid-19th century, which influenced the development of society and religious values in the early Colony, as well as the development of early Australian industries such as viticulture. From 1837 to 1852 Lang's pioneering Bounty migration scheme provided assisted passage to Scottish, German and Irish settlers who were carefully selected to inject religious values into the colony as well as much needed trades and skills. Dunmore House has direct associations with this migration scheme as the destination point, place of settlement and work for many of the Scottish migrants imported through this scheme.

Lang is recognised in J. M. Freeland's Architecture in Australia as an "Australia-conscious leader" in the colony. Through his major migrant intake he brought trade skills to the country which influenced the evolution and quality of colonial architecture. His Presbyterian beliefs manifested themselves in other architectural idioms at the time including, in 1824, the introduction of the first appearance of the Gothic style in Australian building (under architect Standish Lawrence Harris) who designed a small stone kirk in the form of a parish church.

The place is important in demonstrating aesthetic characteristics and/or a high degree of creative or technical achievement in New South Wales.

Dunmore House represents a fine and early example of a convict-built Colonial Georgian homestead complex dating from c.1833. It retains many of its original outbuildings, which have recently undergone extensive conservation works. The homestead complex is a prominent local landmark visible from multiple directions because of its elevated situation in a landscape of rolling hills intersected by the river. It predates the construction of Tocal Homestead and Aberglasslyn House by seven years, making it a very early surviving example of a substantial European residential/rural development in the Hunter Region.

The property also demonstrates the nature of rural properties established as a result of land grants given by Governor Macquarie. It also represents a substantial record of the incremental manner in which this property grew under the hand of a person who purchased and developed the place on the basis of cash rather than mortgages, a family philosophy.

The place has strong or special association with a particular community or cultural group in New South Wales for social, cultural or spiritual reasons.

Dunmore House is likely to have social significance to members of the Scots Church in Sydney, the Presbyterian community and present-day descendants of the early German, Scottish and Irish settlers who Lang was responsible for shipping out to the Colony as part of his pioneering Bounty Scheme which operated from 1837-1852. Many were highlanders from the Isle of Skye, who were refugees from the Highland clearances. A large number of these Scottish migrants settled as a group around Dunmore House to farm his family's estate, including twenty families off the "Midlothian" ship. The nearby Largs village (originally named "Dunmore") was established by the Lang family to house these new migrants.

One present-day descendant of German migrants who made a submission on the proposed listing recalls her ancestors, Ignatz and Anna Maria Hartge, who sailed from England in 1849 on the "Parland", a British merchant vessel. On this ship alone were 165 German immigrants - nearly all from the Rheinish provinces of Germany. The Hartge family were sent to work on the property for Andrew Lang as vine dressers. The free German settlers were valued for their knowledge of the culture of the vine.

The place has potential to yield information that will contribute to an understanding of the cultural or natural history of New South Wales.

Dunmore House has potential to provide evidence of two forms of early colonial settlement - in its use of convict labour under private assignment for constructing the buildings and farming the estate, as well as the migration, settlement and use of skilled free settlers mostly from Scotland and Germany for farming the estate and establishing a society modelled, it seems, on Scotland. The property also provides evidence of early 19th century farming practices, architecture and building techniques used in the settlement of the early New South Wales colony.

The place possesses uncommon, rare or endangered aspects of the cultural or natural history of New South Wales.

Dunmore House predates the construction of Tocal homestead and Aberglasslyn House by seven years, making it a very early surviving example of a substantial European residential/rural development in the Hunter region.

The place is important in demonstrating the principal characteristics of a class of cultural or natural places/environments in New South Wales.

The convict-built and operated Colonial Georgian property represents the early settlement and farming practices of the New South Wales colony, as well the colony's early connections to the Presbyterian Church, evangelism and Scottish immigration.

Dunmore House meets this criterion of State significance because it shows much of the layering of development of the property from 1827 onwards. The only external component missing is the slab hut that was the original shelter while the pavilion was constructed.

The group of buildings retain their landmark qualities. Residents lower down on the Paterson River, towards Raymond Terrace and Millers Forest, relied on the forewarnings of floods impending from properties upstream. The large landholdings were the key locations for these warnings, including houses at Tocal, Mindariba, Dunmore, Wallalong properties, providing a chain of visual communication. The openness of the landscape and lines of sight of each of these properties to the other facilitated this important measure.

Dunmore was a large agricultural producer including wheat and maize for flour, milled on site, tobacco, dairy products including milk, butter and cheese, fruit and wine. German vinedressers were brought to the colony for the particular task of tending the vineyard.

Dunmore supplied the Sydney markets via the steam ferries that plied the Paterson and Hunter Rivers and traversed the coast from Newcastle to Sydney. The buildings remaining demonstrate the core support facilities that provided such produce. The property supported 300 people engaged in tending the land as tenant farmers and labourers.

While the property is much smaller now, Dunmore still retains the riverfront views for its 8.047 km (5 mile) river frontage, that which was finally included within the scope of the property.

== See also ==
- Australian residential architectural styles
