= Lethbridge (surname) =

Lethbridge is a surname. Notable people with the surname include:

- Alice Lethbridge (1866–1948), English music hall dancer and Gaiety Girl
- Arthur Lethbridge (Ivor of Ivor Moreton and Dave Kaye) (1908–1984), British singer and pianist
- Bradley Lethbridge (born 2000), English footballer
- Christopher Lethbridge (cricketer) (born 1961), English cricketer
- Grace Marguerite Lethbridge or Grace Marguerite Hay Drummond-Hay (1895–1946), the first woman to travel around the world by air
- John Lethbridge (1675–1759), inventor of an early diving apparatus in 1715
- John Sydney Lethbridge (1897–1961), British soldier
- Julian Lethbridge (born 1947), British painter
- Robert Lethbridge (born 1947), professor of French and Master of Fitzwilliam College Cambridge
- Robert Lethbridge (politician), Australian politician
- Roper Lethbridge (1840–1919), British academic and civil servant in India
- T. C. Lethbridge (1901–1971), British explorer, author, archaeologist and psychic researcher
- Timothy C. Lethbridge (born 1963), Canadian computer scientist and Professor, University of Ottawa
- William Lethbridge (1825–1901), after whom the city of Lethbridge, Alberta, was named
- Nemone Lethbridge (1932–present), barrister and playwright. Daughter of John Sydney Lethbridge

Fictional characters:

- Brigadier Lethbridge-Stewart, a character on the television show Doctor Who
