= Alexander Warren =

Scottish-born Australian politician

Alexander Warren (1795 – 3 July 1876) was a Scottish-born Australian politician.

He was born in Glasgow to merchant William Warren and Jean Jarvie. He migrated to New South Wales in 1824, working as an agent for a mercantile firm based in Edinburgh. He acquired land on the Williams River, where he had vineyards. From 1856 to 1858 he was a member of the New South Wales Legislative Council. Warren died in 1876.
