= Charles Riley (politician) =

Australian politician

Charles Riley was an Australian politician.

He was a barrister who was called to the bar in 1852. He resided on the North Shore. He was a member of the New South Wales Legislative Council from 1856 until his resignation in 1858. While in parliament, he was involved in a public stoush with William Forster over media reports regarding comments allegedly made in parliament.
