= John McNamara (artist) =

American artist

Congestion by John McNamara, 1985, Honolulu Museum of Art

John McNamara (born 1950) is an American artist who was born in Cambridge, Massachusetts. He graduated from the Massachusetts College of Art in 1971 with a BFA in painting and in 1977 with an MFA. In 1975, he began teaching painting at the Massachusetts College of Art and remained there until 1983. He received a National Endowment for the Arts fellowship in 1981. Since 1993, he has taught at University of California, Berkeley. He currently lives in Novato CA with his wife, educator and writer Diane Darrow and sons filmmaker Jeremy McNamara and musician Seamus McNamara.

John McNamara's paintings from the 1980s and 1990s are abstract landscapes. Congestion, in the collection of the Honolulu Museum of Art, is an example of the artist's abstract landscapes that have been described as both sensual and painterly. Although superficially resembling abstract expressionism, vegetation is clearly present. In 1992, McNamara began investigating the relationship between painting and photography by affixing photographs and postcards to canvas or wood panels and then proceeding to paint over them. The Boston Public Library, the Davis Museum and Cultural Center (Wellesley College, Wellesley, MA), the DeCordova Museum and Sculpture Park (Lincoln, MA), the Fitchburg Art Museum (Fitchburg, MA), the Honolulu Museum of Art the Metropolitan Museum of Art, the Museum of Fine Arts, Boston, the Rose Art Museum (Brandeis University, Waltham, MA), the Smith College Museum of Art (Northampton, MA), the Currier Museum of Art (Manchester, NH), the Speed Art Museum (Louisville, KY) and the Tucson Museum of Art (Tucson, AZ) are among the public collections holding work by John McNamara.
