= Alexander Portus =

Australian politician

Alexander Brown Portus (1834 – 1905) was an Australian engineer and politician.

Portus was born at Black Creek, near Morpeth, the son of a mill owner John Portus and wife Elizabeth. He was educated at a local school under a Mr. Carmichael, and travelled to Europe at 21 for the 1855 Paris Exhibition, also visiting British North America and the United States. Upon his return, he worked as an engineer alongside his brother at Raymond Terrace. He was also a director of the Maitland and Morpeth Railway Company and the Hunter River New Steam Navigation Company. In May 1861, he was one of Charles Cowper's 21 appointments to the New South Wales Legislative Council, however did not take his seat in the council.

He was appointed to the dredge section of the Department of Public Works in 1865 under Edward Orpen Moriarty. He was assigned to Newcastle as master and engineer of the dredge Hunter, and in 1873 assumed command of the new dredge Newcastle. He was promoted to head the section as superintending engineer for dredges in 1886, at which time he moved to Sydney. He was credited with having been responsible for designing many of the state's dredges and upgrading the colony's dredging capacity. He retired from the public service in September 1904.

He died at his home in Sydney in 1905 and was buried at Morpeth.
