= James Walker (New South Wales politician) =

Australian politician

James Walker (I November 1785 – 24 November 1856) was a Scottish-born Australian politician.

He came to New South Wales in 1823 with the Royal Marine Artillery, and became a merchant in partnership with his brother and nephews. . He acquired extensive pastoral land in the 1840s. In May 1856 he was appointed to the New South Wales Legislative Council, but he died on 24 November 1856 (aged 70–71) in Sydney, .

== Qualifications, occupations and interests ==
James Walker joined the Royal Marine Artillery and arrived in Sydney in September 1823 as an officer with the Royal Marine Artillery as an officer on half-pay and a shareholder with his elder brother William and two nephews, William Bejamin and one other in William Walker & Company; merchants, coastal shippers and whalers. He was soon granted 2000 acres at Wallerawang and settled there in 1824. He visited London with his brother in 1831, founding Walker Bros. & Company; in which in the late 1830s exported large quantities of wool to London. In the 1840s he joined the squatting rush, acquiring large holdings. In 1854 his interests included sixteen runs totalling 256,000 acres in the Bligh District, four runs totalling 70,500 acres in the Wellington District, and Baradean, 19,840 acres on the Liverpool Plains.

In May 1856 he was appointed to the New South Wales Legislative Council, but he died on 24 November 1856 in Sydney, .

== Personal ==
He was the eldest son of Archibald Walker, Laird of Edenshead, Fife, and merchant of Perth, Scotland, and his second wife Isabel Walker, daughter of the Laird of Falfield. Married Robina Walker in 1832. His immediate younger brother William was also a prominent merchant in early Sydney.
