= James Fitzgerald Murray =

Irish-born Australian politician

James Fitzgerald Murray (1805 – 24 June 1856) was an Irish-born Australian politician.

He was born at Limerick to Captain Terence Murray and Ellen Fitzgerald. He attended Trinity College, Dublin and the Edinburgh College of Surgeons, and migrated to New South Wales in 1828. He was a surgeon at Sydney Hospital and acquired extensive property. On 4 June 1856 he was appointed to the New South Wales Legislative Council, but he died 21 days later at Lake George.

His siblings were the politician Terence Aubrey Murray and writer Anna Maria Bunn.
