= Francis Oakes =

Australian politician

Francis Oakes (1818 – 5 August 1866) was an Australian politician.

He was born in New South Wales to public servant Francis Oakes and Rebecca Oakes, née Small. He was a pastoralist with land in the Lachlan River district. From 1860 to 1861 he was a member of the New South Wales Legislative Council. Oakes died in 1866 at Parramatta.
