= William Hardy (Australian politician) =

Australian lawyer and politician

William Hardy (died 11 November 1878) was an Australian lawyer and politician.

Hardy was a solicitor and a partner in the prominent Sydney law firm of Stenhouse and Hardy. He was one of Charles Cowper's 21 appointments to the New South Wales Legislative Council in May 1861, but did not take his seat. He subsequently left New South Wales and returned to Ireland. He died from smallpox in 1878 at Booterstown, near Dublin.
