= William Innes (Australian politician) =

Australian politician

William Innes was an Australian politician.

He was one of Charles Cowper's 21 appointments to the New South Wales Legislative Council in May 1861, but did not take his seat.
