= Alexander Busby (politician) =

Australian politician

Alexander Busby (1808 – 26 April 1873) was an English-born Australian politician.

He was the son of surveyor John Busby and Sarah Kennedy, and migrated to New South Wales in 1824. He bought land near Cassilis in the 1830s in partnership with his brother William. A pastoralist, he married Caroline Cripps. From 1856 to 1858 he was a member of the New South Wales Legislative Council. Busby died in England in 1873.
