= George Forbes (New South Wales politician) =

Australian politician

George Forbes was an Australian politician.

He was probably of private means and lived at Parramatta. From 1858 to 1861 he was a member of the New South Wales Legislative Council.
