= Andrew Lang (Australian politician) =

Scottish-born Australian politician (1804-1874)

Andrew Lang (1804−3 June 1874) (Note: The Maitland Mercury gives his date of death as 3 May 1874.) was a Scottish-born farmer, builder and politician in the Colony of New South Wales.

He was the third son of William and Mary Lang; his father was a small landowner and ship's joiner. His brothers George and John had migrated to New South Wales and Andrew followed with his parents and sister Isabella in 1823 aboard the vessel Greenock. George acquired 1,000 acres (400 ha) of land near Maitland, which was between what is now Largs and Paterson. He then purchased an additional 600 acres (240 ha) which he named Dunmore. George died in 1825 and his property passed to Andrew. His father and Andrew built Dunmore House around 1830. Andrew also acquired land near Maitland and in the Illawarra.

In 1858 he was appointed a member of the New South Wales Legislative Council. His term ended in 1861 and he was not re-appointed.

He died in London on 3 June 1874 (aged 70).

Dunmore House at Maitland is now heritage-listed.
