= Robert Lethbridge (politician) =

Australian politician

Robert Lethbridge was an Australian politician.

He was a navy captain, and married Mary Luxmore in 1822, after which he migrated to New South Wales to breed merino sheep. He acquired extensive pastoral land in the colony. From 1856 to 1857 he was a member of the New South Wales Legislative Council.
