= William George Pennington =

Australian politician

William George Pennington was an Australian politician.

He was a solicitor who qualified in Britain and migrated to New South Wales in 1849. In the colony he was a law reporter, and from 1858 to 1859 a member of the New South Wales Legislative Council. In 1863 he was secretary of the Court of Claims and from 1867 to 1868 second examiner of titles at the Land Titles Office.
