= John McNamara (Australian politician) =

Australian politician

John McNamara was an Australian politician.

He was a merchant and shipowner. From 1856 to 1859 he was a member of the New South Wales Legislative Council.
