= Henry Bloomfield (British Army officer) =

British Army officer and Australian politician (1798–1870)

Lieutenant-General Henry Bloomfield
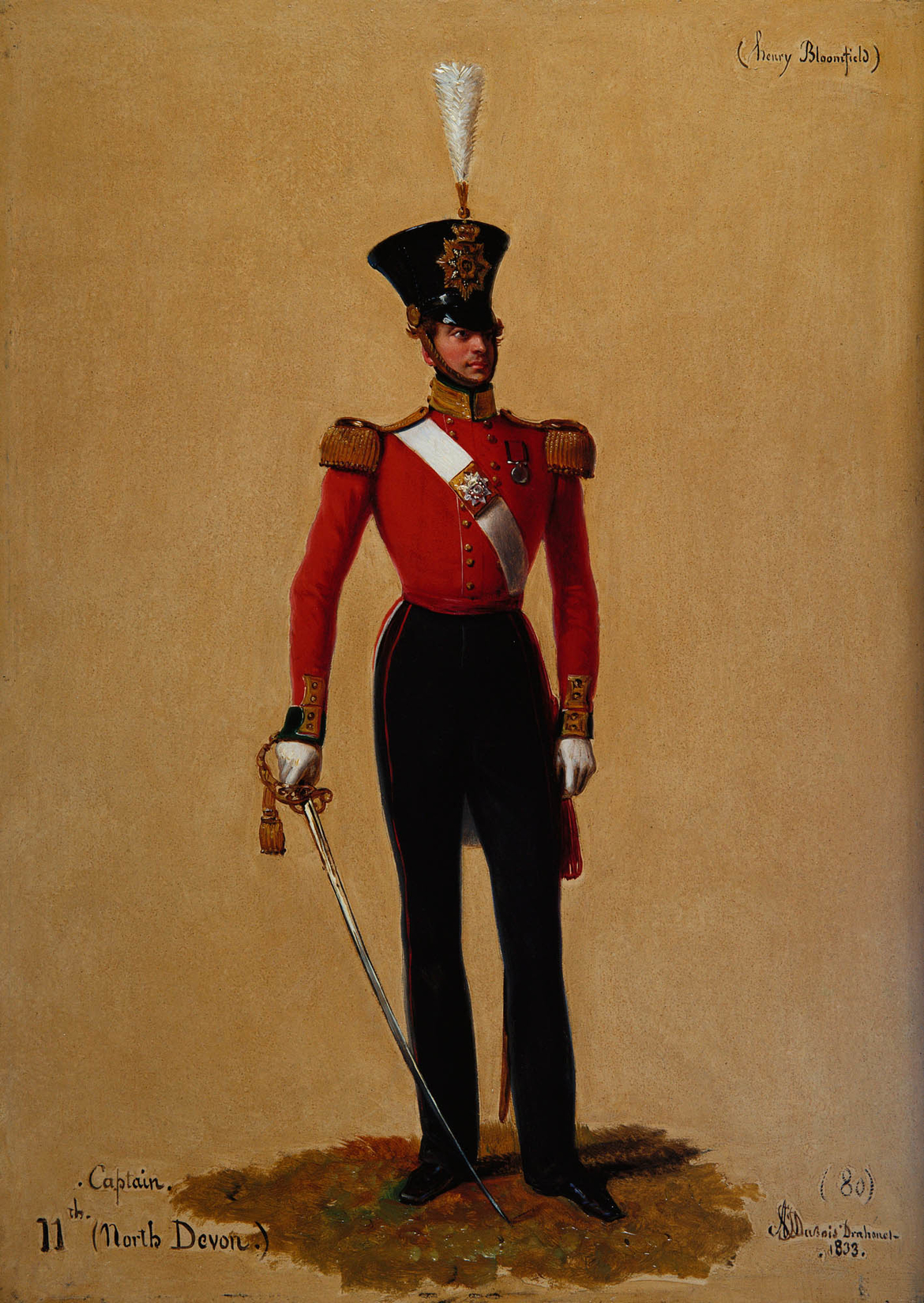
- Portrait by Alexandre-Jean Dubois-Drahonet, 1833
- Birth name: Henry Keane Bloomfield
- Born: c. 1798
- Died: 11 February 1870 Piccadilly, London, England

Lieutenant-General Henry Keane Bloomfield (c. 1798 - 11 February 1870) was an English soldier and whilst serving in New South Wales an Australian politician.

He was a soldier, being first commissioned as an ensign in 1813 with the 59th (2nd Nottinghamshire) Regiment of Foot. He served at the Battle of Waterloo in 1815 and received the Waterloo Medal, and in 1817 was promoted to lieutenant. In 1823 he transferred to the 11th Regiment of Foot. He was further promoted to captain in 1824, major in 1838 and lieutenant colonel in 1845. He became a brevet colonel in 1858.

In 1856, while in command of the army in New South Wales, he was appointed to the New South Wales Legislative Council, but he left the colony with his regiment in 1857.

In 1867 he was given the colonelcy for life of the 64th (2nd Staffordshire) Regiment of Foot and in 1868 made lieutenant-general.

Bloomfield died at 108 Jermyn Street, Piccadilly, London on 11 February 1870.

Military offices
Preceded by Sir James Freeth	Colonel of the 64th (2nd Staffordshire) Regiment of Foot; 1867–1870	Succeeded by Sir Charles Algernon Lewis
