= Charles Algernon Lewis =

British Army general

General Charles Algernon Lewis
- Born: Charles Algernon Lewis; 7 July 1807; Weston super Mare, Somerset, England
- Died: 30 January 1904 (aged 96); London, England
- Military career
- Allegiance: United Kingdom
- Branch: British Army
- Service years: 1825–1903
- Rank: General
- Units: Grenadier Guards; 64th Regiment of Foot
- Commands: 3rd Battalion the Grenadier Guards
- Conflicts: Crimean War Battle of Sebastopol
- Awards: Crimea Medal

General Charles Algernon Lewis (1807-1904) was a senior British Army officer, who served in the Crimean War and became one of the oldest generals in the British Army when he died at the age of 96.

== Family background ==
Charles Lewis was born in Weston-super-Mare on 7 Jul 1807; his parents were Israel and Anne Lewis. His father was the vicar of Long Ashton in Somerset. Charles Lewis married Mary Mirehouse (daughter of John and Mary Mirehouse) in St George's Church, Hannover Square, London in 1852. His wife Mary was 11 years his junior when they were married. They do not appear to have had any children. General Lewis died in London on 30 January 1904. On his death he was survived by his wife who died in 1911.

== Military career ==
Charles Lewis was commissioned as an ensign in the 2nd Battalion The First (Grenadier) Regiment of Foot Guards on 13 October 1825; he was promoted to lieutenant on 15 August 1826. He is recorded as being posted to the 2nd Dragoon Guards in 1830, although he returns to the Foot Guards and is promoted to captain on 12 April 1833. He then promotes to captain (and lieutenant colonel in the Guards) on 30 December 1843 (all promotions were by purchase). He was promoted to colonel on 20 June 1854 by brevet. He was promoted to major general on 19 June 1860, to lieutenant general on 8 March 1869 and to general on 5 April 1876.

Charles Lewis served with his regiment in Canada during the rebellion (1838-1839). His campaign service also included the Crimean War and he is recorded as having commanded his regiment and divisions in actions against the Russians. He was at the Siege of Sevastopol (1854–55). He was awarded the Crimea Medal along with two Turkish Decorations (the Order of the Medjidie 5th Class and the Turkish Crimea Medal) for his war service.

General Lewis would become the Regimental Colonel of the 64th Regiment of Foot in 1870 a post he was still holding in 1902 (albeit an honorary post).
