= 1979 Houston Astros season =

18th season in Major League Baseball for the Houston Astros

1979 Houston Astros
- League: National League
- Division: West
- Ballpark: Astrodome
- City: Houston, Texas
- Record: 89–73 (.549)
- Divisional place: 2nd
- Owners: John McMullen
- General managers: Tal Smith
- Managers: Bill Virdon
- Television: KRIV
- Radio: KPRC (AM) (Gene Elston, Dewayne Staats, Larry Dierker)

The 1979 Houston Astros season was the 18th season for the Major League Baseball (MLB) franchise located in Houston, Texas, their 15th as the Astros, 18th in the National League (NL), 11th in the NL West division, and 15th at The Astrodome. The Astros entered the season having completed a 74–88 record for fifth place and 21 games behind the division-champion and NL pennant-winning Los Angeles Dodgers.

On Opening Day, April 6, J. R. Richard made his fourth Opening Day start for Houston, who hosted the Atlanta Braves and won, 2–1. On April 7, Ken Forsch tossed a no-hitter versus Atlanta, the sixth no-hitter in Astros history, and 6–0 Astros win. On May 16, the National League approved the sale of the Astros to John McMullen. During the amateur draft, Houston's first round selection was catcher John Mizerock at eighth overall. In the sixth round, they chose second baseman Bill Doran.

For the first time, Houston sent as many as four representatives for the National League in the MLB All-Star Game, including shortstop Craig Reynolds, his second selection, and pitchers Joe Niekro (first), Joaquín Andújar (second), and Joe Sambito (first).

The season after becoming the first right-hander in National League history to convert 300 strikeouts, Richard improved on the category, leading the NL for a second successive season (313). He also become the first Astro to garner the earned run average (ERA) title (2.71), while Niekro became the first Astro to lead the league in wins (21). Moreover, Niekro became the first Astro to be recognized for a full-season pitching award, by The Sporting News as the NL Pitcher of the Year. (Note: From its inception in 1944 until 2013, The Sporting News recognized one pitcher each from the NL and the American League (AL) for this award.) Another Sporting News award went to outfielder Jeffrey Leonard, as the NL Rookie Player of the Year (Note: From 1961–2003, The Sporting News declared one rookie position player and pitcher from each league, the NL and the American League (AL), for this award. Starting in 2004, this system was modified to selecting one rookie from each league for the award, regardless of position.) and selection to the Topps All-Star Rookie Team. The 1979 Astros also were the final National League franchise of the 20th century to hit more triples (52) than home runs (49).

The Astros concluded the season with an 89–73 record, in second place and 1½ games behind the first-place Cincinnati Reds. At the time, this represented the most wins in club history along with the closest to first place ever finished, supplanting the records of the 1972 club. The following year, the Astros exceeded this new club record for wins while winning their first division title.

== Offseason ==
- December 8, 1978: Floyd Bannister was traded by the Astros to the Seattle Mariners for Craig Reynolds.

== Regular season ==
=== Summary ===
==== Opening Day ====
Opening Day starting lineup
Uniform	Player	Position
21	Terry Puhl	Right fielder
12	Craig Reynolds	Shortstop
28	César Cedeño	Center fielder
25	José Cruz	Left fielder
23	Enos Cabell	Third baseman
27	Bob Watson	First baseman
18	Art Howe	Second baseman
14	Alan Ashby	Catcher
50	J. R. Richard	Pitcher
Venue: Astrodome • Final: Houston 2, Atlanta 1 Sources:

For Opening Day, April 6, the Astros hosted and defeated the Atlanta Braves, 2–1. Starter J. R. Richard tossed one-run ball over 5 1/3 frames, earning the victory. During the bottom of the first inning, Enos Cabell punched a run batted in-single that plated Terry Puhl and José Cruz for all the support Richard would require. Joaquín Andújar took over for the final 3 2/3 frames to earn the save. Richard's Opening Day start was his fourth, tying him with Larry Dierker for most by an Astros hurler.

==== Ken Forsch's no-hitter ====
On April 7, Ken Forsch tossed a no-hitter of the Braves to lead a 6–0 win at the Astrodome. From the second until the eighth inning, the Astros hurler retired 20 batters consecutively. Catcher Alan Ashby, who tripled in two runs in the seventh to chase Braves' starter Larry McWilliams, drove in three overall. Forsch earned a game score of 88.

In the eighth inning, shortstop Craig Reynolds made a key play, stabbing a line shot to his left barreled off the bat of Dale Murphy. Reynolds fielded the scorcher on one-hop, and fired to first for the out.

During the ninth, Forsch secured a ground ball out from pinch-hitter Rowland Office. Next, Jerry Royster battled, with a ball, a strike, then another ball, before pegging a vicious liner eight feet foul down the third-base line. Royster ended the at bat with a meek grounder to Reynolds. One pitch later, Glenn Hubbard lightly tapped a slow roller to Reynolds, who threw to first for the final out of the masterpiece.

The sixth no-hitter in club history, Forsch's was the first for the Astros since Larry Dierker no-hit the Montreal Expos on July 9, 1976. The subsequent achievement by a Houston Astro was by Nolan Ryan, who srymied the Los Angeles Dodgers on September 26, 1981.

The April 7 date was the earliest in the calendar year for a no-hitter until Hideo Nomo accomplished the feat on April 6, 2001. Sixty-two years earlier, on April 14, 1917, Ed Cicotte of the Chicago White Sox had hurled the previous earliest calendar-date no-hitter by leading a blanking over the St. Louis Browns.

Forsch's batterymate, Ashby, who caught the no-hitter, did so for the first of three for Houston.

Though Forsch had been mainstay on the Astros' pitching staff throughout the entire decade since picking up his first major league win in 1970, he had authored a 23–28 record over the next three seasons. Hence, Forsch was moved from the starting rotation to the bullpen. He did gain an All-Star selection in 1976 while recording 19 saves. In 1979, Forsch was reinstated into the rotation. Meanwhile, his older brother, Bob, had also pitched a no-hitter as a member of the St. Louis Cardinals nearly one year prior on April 16, 1978, a 5–0 victory over the Philadelphia Phillies. Hence, the Forsches become the first set of brothers to have pitched a no-hitter in the major leagues..

Forsch was recognized with the NL Player of the Week Award for April 8.

==== Rest of April ====
During his second start of the season on April 10, Richard set the modern-day record (Note: Since 1893.) for wild pitches uncorked in one game, with 6. In spite of notable lack of control including four bases on balls issued, Richard fired a six-hit complete game against the Los Angeles Dodgers with just one run surrendered, struck out 13, and obtained a game score of 80 for his second win of the season. Houston won by a margin of 2–1, propelled by two doubles courtesy of César Cedeño, another by José Cruz, and a run batted in (RBI) single by Enos Cabell.

Three Astros authored concurrent hitting streaks, with the first starting April 17, and lasting exactly 15 games each. All overlapped from April 26 through May 5. On April 17, Craig Reynolds, began his and maintained until May 5, batting .386. José Cruz produced his from April 21–May 9, hitting .393. Finally, Enos Cabell followed suit, going from April 26 to May 11, batting .320.

Cruz' hitting streak represented his best while in an Astros' uniform until he hit in 19 straight from August 23—September 12, 1983. Cabell's and Reynolds' represented career-highs while with Houston.

For the month of April, Forsch was recognized with the National League (NL) Pitcher of the Month Award. In 5 games, all starts, he went 3–0 with a 2.39 earned run average (ERA) over 39 1/3 innings pitched, and 1.017 walks plus hits per inning pitched (WHIP).

==== May ====
On May 9, to protest the calls of substitute umpire Dave Pallone, the Cardinals bench threw helmets and bats onto the field, which led to the ejection of the Cardinals' entire coaching staff. Pallone, who previously had worked in the minor leagues, was appointed to officiate the game due to the umpires strike.

The sale of the Astros was announced on May 10 from the Ford Motor Credit Company to Dr John McMullen, formerly a partner of George Steinbrenner, owner of the New York Yankees. Quipped McMullen, "There is nothing in life quite so limited as being a limited partner of George Steinbrenner." Six days later, the National League approved for McMullen, a businessman and former Naval architect, to acquire the franchise for a reported figure of $19 million. McMullen had previously owned the Astros and also later became owner of the NHL's New Jersey Devils. This date corresponded to the announcement of another sale of the team which took place in 2011.

The Astros posted a season-high 11 runs scored on May 12 during the premier contest of a doubleheader versus the Chicago Cubs. Cruz, Reynolds, and Terry Puhl each had three hits and at least two runs batted in (RBI), while Bob Watson, Julio González, and Alan Ashby each collected two hits. The Astros totaled 16 hits and 5 bases on balls. Meanwhile, Forsch went the distance, allowed just 2 earned runs to pick up his fourth win, and registered a game score of 64.

During the month of May, Joe Niekro made 7 starts and registered a perfect 6–0 record with 1.70 ERA over 58 1/3 frames, four complete games, two shutouts, and 1.029 WHIP. Hence, Niekro was recognized as NL Pitcher of the Month, succeeding Forsch in a consecutive month.

==== June ====
During the month of June, Joaquín Andújar made six starts, while registering a 5–1 record with 1.59 ERA over 51 frames, five complete games, and 1.020 WHIP. Hence, Andújar was recognized as NL Pitcher of the Month, succeeding Forsch and Niekro for a third consecutive month. This was the first time that Houston presented three awardees during a single season.

==== July ====
Since the inception of the Colt .4s/Astros franchise, Houston had not yet seen a playoff push. Their closest prior to 1979 had been 1972—also the team's first winning season—with an 84–69 record and second-place finish, trailing first place by 10 1/2 games. Yet, as of July 4, they posted a winning percentage upward of .600 and held a 10 1/2-game lead in the NL West.

==== MLB All-Star Game ====
For the first time, four Astros represented the club at the MLB All-Star Game, including shortstop Craig Reynolds, his second selection, and pitchers Joe Niekro (first), Joaquín Andújar (second), and Joe Sambito (first). Prior to this, three were appointed for the 1967 Classic. This record was tied at the 1986 Game, and maintained as the most Astros All-Stars until five were chosen for the 1994 contest.

After Garry Templeton declined his invitation to the All-Star Game, NL manager Tommy Lasorda added Reynolds to the NL roster. A member of the Seattle Mariners the year before, Reynolds was also chosen for the American League in that year's All-Star Game.

==== Later July ====
Struggling through a mid-season slump, on July 22, Houston rallied for a 7–6 victory at Busch Memorial Stadium. In the top of the ninth inning, José Cruz singled home Julio González for the game-winning run batted in (RBI). Terry Puhl cranked a home run and Enos Cabell and Jeffrey Leonard collected three hits apiece to add to the momentum. Joe Sambito hurled two scoreless innings in relief to preserve the win over St. Louis. Just their second win over their previous 14 contests, Houston's ten-game division lead from two weeks earlier had shrunk to just four games.

On July 29, César Cedeño connected for the third walk-off triple in club history. This scored starting pitcher J. R. Richard during the bottom of the ninth for 4–3 victory over Los Angeles. (Note: The most recent walk-off triple was by César Gerónimo on April 28, 1971. The next occurrence was by Casey Candaele on September 28, 1990.) Hence, Richard (9–11), who bookended the contest by also delivering the first pitch, went the distance.

==== August ====
On August 3, J. R. Richard turned in the second 15-strikeout outing of his career and first since his MLB debut on September 5, 1971. The Astros hosted Atlanta, and at the start of play, owned a 3 1/2-game lead in the NL West. In the top of the first, Jerry Royster struck out, then Richard induced a fly out by Gary Matthews, and finished off the frame with a whiff of Rowland Office.

On August 14, the switch-hitting pitcher Joaquín Andûjar slugged his first major league home run, from an offering by the Montreal Expos' notorious eccentric, Bill "Spaceman" Lee. Andujar had warned Lee against a fastball; however, Lee challenged him in the bottom of the second. Hence, Andûjar nailed it for a two-run, inside-the-park home run high off the center field wall, that stood up for an Astros 2–1 Astros victory. On the mound, Andûjar hurled a complete game four hitter, earning the win a game score of 76, yielding the only run of the game to Lee via fielder's choice RBI groundout.

Richard hurled his sixth career two-hitter on August 27, leading a 3–0 defeat of the Expos. César Cedeño kicked off the scoring in the top of the third, doubling in Rafael Landestoy. Cabell plated two runs in the top of the sixth, scoring Craig Reynolds and Terry Puhl off Scott Sanderson. Richard's (14–12) effort garnered a game score of 89. It was Richard's first two-hit effort with double figures in strikeouts (12).

Two weeks after lifting his first major league home run, on August 28, Andûjar connected for his second, off Steve Rogers, also against the Expos. Cabell and Denny Walling both scored a pair of runs; however, the Expos triumphed via a walk-off base on balls that Warren Cromartie coaxed from Joe Sambito with one out in the bottom of the ninth.

During the month of August, Richard completed all six contests in which he appeared, allowing just for earned runs for a 0.67 ERA in 54 innings. He went 5–1, whiffed 62, and surrendered 18 bases on balls.

==== September ====
J. R. Richard whiffed 15 batters on September 21, tying his career-high, last accomplished the previous August 3.

On September 26, the Braves' Phil Niekro doubled in two runs off his younger brother, Joe, to spark a 9–4 win over the Astros. The elder Niekro tallied 4 RBI for the game, while the win evened his record at 20–20, earning the distinction of posting the first record in the National League in 74 years of winning and losing 20 games each. (Note: The most recent pitcher to produce this win–loss record milestone had been Wilbur Wood of the Chicago White Sox in the American League (AL), who tossed a 24‐20 record in 1973.) Niekro's NL predecessor, Irving Young of the Boston Beaneaters (Note: Also a prior season for the Atlanta Braves franchise.) was credited with a 20–21 record. The win tied also made the Niekro brothers the first pair in National League history to record at least 20 wins each.

J. R. Richard earned NL Pitcher of the Month honors for September. His second monthly award, he first won for July 1978, while becoming the first Astro to win two monthly honors. Richard was also the fourth Astro during the season to receive Pitcher of the Month Award to extend the club record. Over 7 September starts, Richard went 4–1, with 4 completed games, 2 shutouts, 1.24 earned run average (ERA), and recorded 69 strikeouts over 58 IP. Additionally, the league hit for .164 batting average against (BAA) while baserunners reached on 0.828 walks plus hits per inning pitched (WHIP).

==== Performance overview ====
The Astros concluded the season with an 89–73 (.549) performance, in second place in the NL West, and trailing Cincinnati by 1 1/2 games. Their performance jumped by 15 wins and 19 1/2 games in the standings. At the time, this represented each of the club's most wins, highest standing within the division, and fewest games away from the division title and hence playoff appearance. The 1979 squad supplanted the achievements of their 1972 counterpart (84 wins, 3rd place, 10 1/2 games behind) for the franchise records. The 1979 club also maintained the upward trend of competitive momentum the following season, finally capturing both their first-ever division title and playoff berth, while recording 93 wins to break the franchise mark yet again.

Having drawn 1,900,312 fans, Houston saw attendance rise steadily over the fourth consecutive season since 1975. This was the second-highest figure in club history, trailing only the 1965 edition, which drew 2,151,470 during their first year at the Astrodome. The next year, fans returned to the 2-million threshold. Bill Virdon also cemented his place as the longest-tenured manager is club history.

The 1979 Astros achieved another distinction by remaining as the final National League franchise of the 20th century to hit more triples (52) than home runs (49). Houston's starting pitchers belted four of home runs—two each by Andújar and Richard.

Commencing with Forsch's early-season no-hitter, and All-Star nods for Niekro, Andújar, and Sambito, Astros pitching led the most successful-to-date season in club history, setting a number of franchise records along with unprecedented achievements. The starting rotation took turns claiming four National League (NL) Pitcher of the Month Awards, more than they had won in any year prior, starting in April (Forsch), May (Niekro), June (Andújar), and September (J. R. Richard). Richard and Niekro further led the league in a number of key individual categories.

The season after becoming the first right-hander in NL history to reach the 300-strikeout plateau, and simultaneously the first Astro lead to league in the category (303), J. R. Richard improved upon his 1978 strikeout total by whiffing 313 and winning his second title in a row. He also became the first to accumulate 300 whiffs in successive years since Sandy Koufax in 1965 and 1966. Moreover, per the Elias Sports Bureau (ESB), Richard became the second hurler since 1950 to lead MLB in strikeouts, ERA, and batting average against, joining Koufax in 1965. (Note: In 1986, Mike Scott became the second Astros pitcher to equal this feat.) Richard complemented this unprecedented achievement for the team by becoming the first Astros pitcher to lead the league in earned run average (2.71 ERA). Thus, Richard became the first in club history to lead the league in two-thirds of the pitching Triple Crown, (Note: Composed of leading the league in each of wins, strikeouts and ERA.) and the Astros' first five-time team leader in strikeouts. (Note: Bob Bruce, Mike Cuellar, Don Wilson, Jerry Reuss, and Larry Dierker, all had previously led the Colt .45s/Astros pitching staff twice.) This was also his fourth successive campaign with 18 or more wins, another club record. (Note: Number of seasons player meets criteria, playing for HOU, in the regular season, requiring wins ≥ 18, sorted by descending instances.)

Meanwhile, Joe Niekro set the franchise record in wins with 21, and became the club's first league leader. (Note: Tied his older brother, Phil, for the league lead in wins, the only time two brothers have accomplished this feat.) Richard, as the ERA and strikeout leader, along with Niekro, combined to lead the NL in all three Triple Crown categories. The 1979 season marked first time that all three individual Triple Crown categories were claimed by Astros pitching.

In 2019, another tandem of Astros hurlers swept the individual Triple Crown categories. Gerrit Cole led the American League (AL) in ERA (2.50) and strikeouts (326), while Justin Verlander was the AL leader in wins (21).

Niekro became the first Astro to win The Sporting News (TSN) NL Pitcher of the Year Award, while outfielder Jeffrey Leonard was recognized by TSN as the NL Rookie Player of the Year, the fourth overall in franchise history—preceded by second baseman Joe Morgan (1965), right-hander Tom Griffin (1969), and right fielder Greg Gross (1974). Niekro was also recognized with the Houston Astros' team Most Valuable Player Award (MVP).

=== League standings ===
==== National League West ====
NL West
Team	W	L	Pct.	GB	Home	Road
Cincinnati Reds	90	71	.559	—	48‍–‍32	42‍–‍39
Houston Astros	89	73	.549	1½	52‍–‍29	37‍–‍44
Los Angeles Dodgers	79	83	.488	11½	46‍–‍35	33‍–‍48
San Francisco Giants	71	91	.438	19½	38‍–‍43	33‍–‍48
San Diego Padres	68	93	.422	22	39‍–‍42	29‍–‍51
Atlanta Braves	66	94	.412	23½	34‍–‍45	32‍–‍49

==== Record versus opponents ====
National League

1979 National League record Sources:
Team	ATL	CHC	CIN	HOU	LAD	MON	NYM	PHI	PIT	SD	SF	STL
Atlanta	—	4–8	6–12	7–11	12–6	1–9	4–8	7–5	4–8	6–12	11–7	4–8
Chicago	8–4	—	7–5	6–6	5–7	6–12	8–10	9–9	6–12	9–3	8–4	8–10
Cincinnati	12–6	5–7	—	8–10	11–7	6–6	8–4	8–4	8–4	10–7	6–12	8–4
Houston	11–7	6–6	10–8	—	10–8	7–5	9–3	5–7	4–8	14–4	7–11	6–6
Los Angeles	6–12	7–5	7–11	8–10	—	6–6	9–3	3–9	4–8	9–9	14–4	6–6
Montreal	9–1	12–6	6–6	5–7	6–6	—	15–3	11–7	7–11	7–5	7–5	10–8
New York	8–4	10–8	4–8	3–9	3–9	3–15	—	5–13	8–10	4–8	8–4	7–11
Philadelphia	5–7	9–9	4–8	7–5	9–3	7–11	13–5	—	8–10	9–3	6–6	7–11
Pittsburgh	8–4	12–6	4–8	8–4	8–4	11–7	10–8	10–8	—	7–5	9–3	11–7
San Diego	12–6	3–9	7–10	4–14	9–9	5–7	8–4	3–9	5–7	—	8–10	4–8
San Francisco	7–11	4–8	12–6	11–7	4–14	5–7	4–8	6–6	3–9	10–8	—	5–7
St. Louis	8–4	10–8	4–8	6–6	6–6	8–10	11–7	11–7	7–11	8–4	7–5	—

=== Notable transactions ===
- April 27, 1979: The Astros traded a player to be named later to the Kansas City Royals for George Throop. The Astros completed the deal by sending Keith Drumright to the Royals on October 26.
- June 13, 1979: Bob Watson was traded by the Astros to the Boston Red Sox for Pete Ladd, a player to be named later, and cash. The Red Sox completed the deal by sending Bobby Sprowl to the Astros on June 19.

==== Draft picks ====
- June 5, 1979: 1979 Major League Baseball draft
  - John Mizerock was drafted by the Houston Astros in the 1st round (8th pick).
  - Bill Doran was drafted by the Astros in the 6th round.
  - Mark Ross was drafted by the Astros in the 7th round.
  - Lemmie Miller was drafted by the Astros in the 1st round (20th pick) of the secondary phase, but did not sign.

=== Roster ===
1979 Houston Astros
Roster
Pitchers: 47 Joaquín Andújar; 37 Tom Dixon; 43 Ken Forsch; 31 Frank LaCorte; 39 Pete Ladd; 39 Bo McLaughlin; 54 Mike Mendoza; 36 Joe Niekro; 46 Randy Niemann; 34 Gordie Pladson; 45 Frank Riccelli; 50 J. R. Richard; 42 Bert Roberge; 48 Vern Ruhle; 35 Joe Sambito; 41 Bobby Sprowl; 33 George Throop; 38 Rick Williams; 41 Gary Wilson	Catchers: 14 Alan Ashby; 6 Reggie Baldwin; 13 Bruce Bochy; 11 Alan Knicely; 8 Luis Pujols; Infielders: 16 Dave Bergman; 23 Enos Cabell; 28 César Cedeño; 9 Julio González; 18 Art Howe; 17 Rafael Landestoy; 12 Craig Reynolds; 24 Jimmy Sexton; 27 Bob Watson	Outfielders: 22 Jesús Alou; 25 José Cruz; 20 Danny Heep; 30 Jeffrey Leonard; 21 Terry Puhl; 29 Denny Walling; 19 Tom Wiedenbauer	Manager: 7 Bill Virdon; Coaches: 4 Deacon Jones; 5 Bob Lillis; 3 Tony Pacheco; 2 Mel Wright

== Game log ==
=== Regular season ===
1979 regular season game log: 89–73 (Home: 52–29; Away: 37–44)
April: 15–6 (Home: 8–1; Away: 7–5)

#	Date	Time (CT)	Opponent	Score	Win	Loss	Save	Time of Game	Attendance	Record	Box/ Streak
1	April 6		Braves							1–0	W1
2	April 7		Braves							2–0	W2
3	April 8		Braves							3–0	W3
4	April 9		Dodgers							3–1	L1
5	April 10		Dodgers							4–1	W1
6	April 11		Dodgers							5–1	W2
7	April 13		@ Giants							5–2	L1
8	April 14		@ Giants							5–3	L2
9 (1)	April 15		@ Giants						–	6–3	W1
10 (2)	April 15		@ Giants							7–3	W2
11	April 16		@ Dodgers							8–3	W3
12	April 17		@ Dodgers							8–4	L1
13	April 18		@ Dodgers							9–4	W1
14	April 20	7:35 p.m. CST	Pirates	**W** 5–4 (10)	**Sambito** (1–0)	Bibby (1–1)	–	3:16	19,834	10–4	W2
15	April 21	7:35 p.m. CST	Pirates	**W** 5–4 (10)	**Andújar** (2–0)	Tekulve (0–3)	–	3:23	48,977	11–4	W3
16	April 22	3:00 p.m. CST	Pirates	**W** 3–2	**Andújar** (3–0)	Candelaria (0–1)	**Sambito** (2)	2:27	22,403	12–4	W4
—	April 24		@ Cubs	**Postponed (Rain)** (Makeup date: July 7)							
17	April 25		@ Cubs							12–5	L1
18	April 26		@ Cubs							13–5	W1
19	April 27	6:35 p.m. CST	@ Pirates	**W** 9–8 (11)	**Riccelli** (1–0)	Whitson (1–1)	–	3:30	5,767	14–5	W2
—	April 28		@ Pirates	**Postponed (Rain)** (Makeup date: July 19)							
20	April 29	12:05 p.m. CDT	@ Pirates	L 5–10	Kison (1–0)	**Niekro** (1–2)	Jackson (3)	3:07	7,598	14–6	L1
21	April 30		@ Cardinals							15–6	W1

May: 14–17 (Home: 9–8; Away: 5–9)

#	Date	Time (CT)	Opponent	Score	Win	Loss	Save	Time of Game	Attendance	Record	Box/ Streak
22	May 1		@ Cardinals							15–7	L1
23	May 2		@ Cardinals							15–8	L2
24	May 3		@ Cardinals							16–8	W1
25	May 4		@ Reds	L 5–6 (10)		**Riccelli** (1–1)	–	3:47	20,988	16–9	L1
26	May 5		@ Reds	L 2–6		**Andújar** (3–1)		2:13	25,044	16–10	L2
27 (1)	May 6		@ Reds	L 5–17				2:48	–	16–11	L3
28 (2)	May 6		@ Reds	**W** 8–2				3:00	33,618	17–11	W1
29	May 8		Cardinals							17–12	L1
30	May 9		Cardinals							18–12	W1
31	May 10		Cardinals							18–13	L1
32	May 11		Cubs							18–14	L2
33	May 12 (1)		Cubs						–	19–14	W1
34	May 12 (2)		Cubs							19–15	L1
35	May 13		Cubs							20–15	W1
36	May 15		Giants							20–16	L1
37	May 16		Giants							20–17	L2
38	May 17		Giants							20–18	L3
39	May 18		Padres							21–18	W1
40	May 19		Padres							21–19	L1
41 (1)	May 20		Padres						–	22–19	W1
42 (2)	May 20		Padres							23–19	W2
43	May 21		@ Braves							23–20	L1
44	May 22		@ Braves							24–20	W1
45	May 23		@ Braves							24–21	L1
46	May 25		@ Padres							24–22	L2
47	May 26		@ Padres							25–22	W1
48	May 27		@ Padres							26–22	W2
49	May 28		@ Padres							26–23	L1
50	May 29		Reds	**W** 2–1				2:09	17,458	27–23	W1
51	May 30		Reds	**W** 6–3	**Niekro** (7–2)		**Sambito** (4)	2:32	21,757	28–23	W2
52	May 31		Reds	**W** 3–0				2:07	25,453	29–23	W3

June: 20–8 (Home: 13–2; Away: 7–6)

#	Date	Time (CT)	Opponent	Score	Win	Loss	Save	Time of Game	Attendance	Record	Box/ Streak
53	June 1		Expos							30–23	W4
54	June 2		Expos							31–23	W5
55	June 3		Expos							32–23	W6
56	June 4		Phillies							33–23	W7
57	June 5		Phillies							33–24	L1
58	June 6		Phillies							34–24	W1
59	June 8		@ Mets							35–24	W2
60	June 9		@ Mets							35–25	L1
61	June 10		@ Mets							36–25	W1
62	June 11		@ Phillies							36–26	L1
63	June 12		@ Phillies							36–27	L2
64	June 13		@ Phillies							37–27	W1
65	June 15		@ Expos							38–27	W2
66	June 16		@ Expos							38–28	L1
67	June 17		@ Expos							38–29	L2
68	June 18		Mets							39–29	W1
69	June 19		Mets							40–29	W2
70	June 20		Mets							41–29	W3
71	June 22		Padres							42–29	W4
72	June 23		Padres							43–29	W5
73	June 24		Padres							44-29	W6
74 (1)	June 25		Reds	L 1–2				2:31	–	44–30	L1
75 (2)	June 25		Reds	**W** 4–0				2:22	46,313	45–30	W1
76	June 26		Reds	**W** 6–5			**Sambito** (7)	2:32	37,114	46–30	W2
77	June 27		@ Giants							46–31	L1
78	June 28		@ Giants							47–31	W1
79	June 29		@ Padres							48–31	W2
80	June 30		@ Padres							49–31	W3

July: 12–16 (Home: 6–8; Away: 6–8)

#	Date	Time (CT)	Opponent	Score	Win	Loss	Save	Time of Game	Attendance	Record	Box/ Streak
81	July 1		@ Padres							50–31	W4
82	July 3		@ Reds	**W** 3–2				2:13	36,787	51–31	W5
83	July 4		@ Reds	**W** 3–2	**Andújar** (10–4)		**Sambito** (9)	2:24	25,713	52–31	W6
84	July 5		@ Reds	L 4–5				2:48	28,249	52–32	L1
85	July 6		@ Cubs							53–32	W1
86 (1)	July 7		@ Cubs						–	53–33	L1
87 (2)	July 7		@ Cubs							53–34	L2
88	July 8		@ Cubs							53–35	L3
89	July 10	7:30 p.m. CDT	Pirates	L 3–4	Bibby (4–2)	**Andújar** (10–5)	Tekulve (12)	3:09	31,341	53–36	L4
90	July 11	7:35 p.m. CDT	Pirates	L 1–5	Kison (5–4)	**Richard** (7–9)	–	2:10	25,330	53–37	L5
91	July 12	7:35 p.m. CDT	Pirates	L 3–5	Blyleven (7–3)	**Niekro** (13–4)	Tekulve (13)	2:44	22,956	53–38	L6
92	July 13		Cardinals							53–39	L7
93	July 14		Cardinals							54–39	W1
94	July 15		Cardinals							54–40	L1
**50th All-Star Game in Seattle, Washington**
95 (1)	July 19	5:05 p.m. CDT	@ Pirates	L 5–9	Roberts (1–2)	**Forsch** (5–6)	–	2:41	–	54–41	L2
96 (2)	July 19	8:16 p.m. CDT	@ Pirates	L 2–4	Kison (6–4)	**Niekro** (13–5)	Jackson (11)	2:12	33,464	54–42	L3
97	July 20	6:35 p.m. CDT	@ Pirates	L 3–9	Candelaria (9–7)	**Richard** (7–11)	–	2:40	23,585	54–43	L4
98	July 21	1:15 p.m. CDT	@ Pirates	L 5–6	Romo (5–3)	**Sambito** (4–3)	Tekulve (14)	3:00	19,570	54–44	L5
99	July 22		@ Cardinals							55–44	W1
100	July 23		@ Cardinals							56–44	W2
101	July 24		Cubs							57–44	W3
102	July 25		Cubs							58–44	W4
103	July 26		Dodgers							58–45	L1
104	July 27		Dodgers							58–46	L2
105	July 28		Dodgers							59–46	W1
106	July 29		Dodgers							60–46	W2
107	July 30		Giants							60–47	L1
108	July 31		Giants							61–47	W1

August: 15–11 (Home: 8–4; Away: 7–7)

#	Date	Time (CT)	Opponent	Score	Win	Loss	Save	Time of Game	Attendance	Record	Box/ Streak
109	August 1		Giants							62–47	W2
110	August 3		Braves							63–47	W3
111 (1)	August 4		Braves						–	64–47	W4
112 (2)	August 4		Braves							65–47	W5
113	August 5		Braves							66–47	W6
114	August 7		@ Dodgers							66–48	L1
115	August 8		@ Dodgers							67–48	W1
116	August 9		@ Dodgers							67–49	L1
117	August 10		@ Braves							68–49	W1
—	August 11		@ Braves	**Postponed (Rain)** (Makeup date: September 24)							
118	August 12		@ Braves							68–50	L1
119	August 13		Expos							69–50	W1
120	August 14		Expos							70–50	W2
121	August 15		Expos							70–51	L1
122	August 17		Phillies							70–52	L2
123	August 18		Phillies							70–53	L3
124	August 19		Phillies							70–54	L4
125	August 20		@ Mets							71–54	W1
126	August 21		@ Mets							71–55	L1
127	August 22		@ Mets							72–55	W1
128	August 24		@ Phillies							72–56	L1
129	August 25		@ Phillies							73–56	W1
130	August 26		@ Phillies							74–56	W2
131	August 27		@ Expos							75–56	W3
132	August 28		@ Expos							75–57	L1
133	August 29		@ Expos							75–58	L2
134	August 31		Mets							76–58	W1

September: 13–15 (Home: 8–6; Away: 5–9)

#	Date	Time (CT)	Opponent	Score	Win	Loss	Save	Time of Game	Attendance	Record	Box/ Streak
135	September 1		Mets							77–58	W2
136	September 2		Mets							77–59	L1
137	September 3		Dodgers							77–60	L2
138	September 4		Dodgers							78–60	W1
139	September 5		Padres							79–60	W2
140	September 6		Padres							80–60	W3
141	September 7		Giants							80–61	L1
142	September 8		Giants							80–62	L2
143	September 9		Giants							81–62	W1
144	September 11		@ Reds	L 8–9		**Sambito** (7–6)	–	3:14	40,574	81–63	L1
145	September 12		@ Reds	L 4–7		**Niekro** (18–10)		3:00	42,035	81–64	L2
146	September 14		@ Giants							82–64	W1
147	September 15		@ Giants							82–65	L1
148	September 16		@ Giants							82–66	L2
149	September 17		@ Padres							83–66	W1
150	September 18		@ Padres							83–67	L1
151	September 19		Braves							83–68	L2
152	September 20		Braves							84–68	W1
153	September 21		Reds	**W** 3–2 (13)	**Sambito** (8–6)		–	3:30	44,975	85–68	W2
154	September 22		Reds	**W** 4–1	**Niekro** (20–10)		**Sambito** (20)	2:50	46,037	86–68	W3
155	September 23		Reds	L 1–7			–	2:47	42,067	86–69	L1
156 (1)	September 24		@ Braves						–	86–70	L2
157 (2)	September 24		@ Braves							86–71	L3
158	September 25		@ Braves							87–71	W1
159	September 26		@ Braves							87–72	L1
160	September 28		@ Dodgers							87–73	L2
161	September 29		@ Dodgers							88–73	W1
162	September 30		@ Dodgers							89–73	W2

Legend: = Win = Loss = Postponement
Bold = Astros team member

== Player stats ==
Table legend
*	Left-handed batter or pitcher	League leader (Bold: MLB leader)
#	Switch hitter	League top ten
	Leader in appearances at position	Team leader

=== Batting ===
==== Starters by position ====
Note: Pos = Position; G = Games played; AB = At bats; H = Hits; Avg. = Batting average; HR = Home runs; RBI = Runs batted in

Pos	Player	G	AB	H	Avg.	HR	RBI
C	Alan Ashby	108	336	68	.202	2	35
1B	César Cedeño	132	470	123	.262	6	54
2B	Rafael Landestoy	129	282	76	.270	0	30
SS	Craig Reynolds	146	555	147	.265	0	39
3B	Enos Cabell	155	603	164	.272	6	67
LF	José Cruz	157	558	161	.289	9	72
CF	Terry Puhl	157	600	172	.287	8	49
RF	Jeffrey Leonard	134	411	119	.290	0	47

==== Other batters ====
Note: G = Games played; AB = At bats; H = Hits; Avg. = Batting average; HR = Home runs; RBI = Runs batted in

Player	G	AB	H	Avg.	HR	RBI
Art Howe	118	355	88	.248	6	33
Julio González	68	181	45	.249	0	10
Bob Watson	49	163	39	.239	3	18
Denny Walling	82	147	48	.327	3	31
Bruce Bochy	56	129	28	.217	1	6
Luis Pujols	26	75	17	.227	0	8
Jimmy Sexton	52	43	9	.209	0	1
Jesús Alou	42	43	11	.256	0	10
Reggie Baldwin	14	20	4	.200	0	1
Dave Bergman	13	15	6	.400	1	2
Danny Heep	14	14	2	.143	0	2
Alan Knicely	7	6	0	.000	0	0
Tom Wiedenbauer	4	6	4	.667	0	2

=== Starting pitchers ===
Note: G = Games pitched; IP = Innings pitched; W = Wins; L = Losses; ERA = Earned run average; SO = Strikeouts

Player	G	IP	W	L	ERA	SO
J. R. Richard	38	292.1	18	13	**2.71**	**313**
Joe Niekro	38	263.2	21	11	3.00	119
Ken Forsch	26	177.2	11	6	3.04	58
Vern Ruhle	13	66.1	2	6	4.07	33

==== Other pitchers ====
Note: G = Games pitched; IP = Innings pitched; W = Wins; L = Losses; ERA = Earned run average; SO = Strikeouts

Player	G	IP	W	L	ERA	SO
Joaquín Andújar	46	194.0	12	12	3.43	77
Rick Williams	31	121.1	4	7	3.26	37
Randy Niemann	26	67.0	3	2	3.76	24
Frank LaCorte	12	27.0	1	2	5.00	24
Frank Riccelli	11	22.0	2	2	4.09	20

==== Relief pitchers ====
Note: G = Games pitched; Innings pitched; W = Wins; L = Losses; SV = Saves; ERA = Earned run average; SO = Strikeouts

Player	G	IP	W	L	SV	ERA	SO
Joe Sambito	63	91.1	8	7	22	1.77	83
Bert Roberge	26	32.0	3	0	4	1.69	13
Tom Dixon	19	25.2	1	2	0	6.66	9
George Throop	14	22.1	1	0	0	3.22	15
Bo McLaughlin	12	16.1	1	2	0	5.51	12
Pete Ladd	10	12.1	1	1	0	2.92	6
Gary Wilson	6	7.1	0	0	0	12.27	6
Gordie Pladson	4	4.0	0	0	0	4.50	2
Bobby Sprowl	3	4.0	0	0	0	0.00	3
Mike Mendoza	1	1.0	0	0	0	0.00	0

== Awards and achievements ==
=== Pitching achievements ===
300 strikeout club
Player	K	W–L	ERA	K/9
J. R. Richard	313	18–13	2.71	9.6

==== No-hit game ====
Date	Pitcher	IP	BB	BR	K	BF	Catcher	Final	Opponent	Venue	Plate umpire	Box
April 7, 1979	Ken Forsch	9	2	2	3	29	Alan Ashby	6–0	Atlanta Braves	Astrodome	Murray Strey	
April 7, 1979	Forsch: Game score: 88 • Win (1–0)											

=== Awards ===
1979 Houston Astros award winners
Name of award		Recipient	Ref.
Associated Press (AP) All-Star	Pitcher	Joe Niekro	
Associated Press (AP) All-Star	Pitcher	J. R. Richard	
Baseball Digest Rookie All-Star	Left fielder	Jeffrey Leonard	
Houston Astros Most Valuable Player Award (MVP)		Joe Niekro	
MLB All-Star Game	Reserve infielder	Craig Reynolds	
MLB All-Star Game	Reserve pitcher	Joaquín Andújar	
MLB All-Star Game	Reserve pitcher	Joe Niekro	
MLB All-Star Game	Reserve pitcher	Joe Sambito	
National League (NL) Pitcher of the Month	April	Ken Forsch	
National League (NL) Pitcher of the Month	May	Joe Niekro	
National League (NL) Pitcher of the Month	June	Joaquín Andújar	
National League (NL) Pitcher of the Month	September	J. R. Richard	
National League (NL) Player of the Week	April 8	Ken Forsch	
National League (NL) Player of the Week	September 9	Rafael Landestoy	
The Sporting News	NL All-Star—Pitcher	Joe Niekro	
The Sporting News	NL Pitcher of the Year	Joe Niekro	
The Sporting News	NL Rookie Player of the Year	Jeffrey Leonard	
Topps All-Star Rookie Team	Outfielder	Jeffrey Leonard	
United Press International (UPI) All-Star	Pitcher	J. R. Richard	

Other awards results

Name of award	Voting recipient(s) (Team)	Ref.
NL Cy Young Award	1st—Sutter (CHC) • 2nd—J. Niekro (HOU) • 3rd—Richard (HOU)	
NL Most Valuable Player	1st, tied—K. Hernandez (STL) • 1st, tied—Stargell (PIT) • 6th—Niekro (HOU); Other Astros: 19th—Richard • 21st—Sambito	
NL Rookie of the Year	1st—Sutcliffe (LAD) • 2nd—Leonard (HOU)	
Roberto Clemente	Winner—Thornton (CLE) • Nominee—Cruz (HOU)	

=== League leaders ===
NL batting leaders

- Sacrifice flies: César Cedeño (9)
- Sacrifice hits: Craig Reynolds: (34—led MLB)

NL pitching leaders

- Bases on balls per nine innings pitched (BB/9): Ken Forsch (1.8)
- Earned run average (ERA): J. R. Richard (2.71—led MLB)
- Fielding Independent Pitching (FIP): J. R. Richard (2.21—led MLB)
- Hits per nine innings pitched (H/9): J. R. Richard (6.8—led MLB)
- Home runs per nine innings (HR/9): Joaquín Andújar (0.3)
- Shutouts: Joe Niekro (5—led MLB)
- Strikeouts per nine innings pitched (K/9): J. R. Richard (9.6—led MLB)
- Strikeout-to-walk ratio (K/BB): J. R. Richard (3.19—led MLB)
- Strikeouts (SO or K): J. R. Richard (313—led MLB)
- Strikeouts per nine innings pitched (K/9): J. R. Richard (9.6—led MLB)
- Walks plus hits per inning pitched (WHIP): Ken Forsch (1.069—led MLB)
- Wins: Joe Niekro (21)
- Wild pitches: Joe Niekro & J. R. Richard (19—tied, led MLB)

=== Other ===
1979 grand slams
No.	Date	Astros batter	Venue	Inning	Pitcher	Opposing team	Box
None (Note: Houston's second consecutive season without a grand slam.)

== Minor league system ==
Level	Team	League	Manager
AAA	Charleston Charlies	International League	Jim Beauchamp
AA	Columbus Astros	Southern League	Jimmy Johnson
A	Daytona Beach Astros	Florida State League	Carlos Alfonso
Rookie	GCL Astros	Gulf Coast League	Julio Linares

LEAGUE CHAMPIONS: GCL Astros

== See also ==
- 300 strikeout club
- List of Major League Baseball annual ERA leaders
- List of Major League Baseball annual shutout leaders
- List of Major League Baseball annual strikeout leaders
- List of Major League Baseball annual wins leaders
- List of Major League Baseball no-hitters
- List of Major League Baseball titles leaders
