= 1979 San Francisco Giants season =

1979 San Francisco Giants
- League: National League
- Division: West
- Ballpark: Candlestick Park
- City: San Francisco, California
- Owners: Bob Lurie
- General managers: Spec Richardson
- Managers: Joe Altobelli, Dave Bristol
- Television: KTVU (Lindsey Nelson, Gary Park)
- Radio: KNBR (Lindsey Nelson, Hank Greenwald)

The 1979 San Francisco Giants season was the Giants' 97th season in Major League Baseball, their 22nd season in San Francisco since their move from New York following the 1957 season, and their 20th at Candlestick Park. The team finished in fourth place in the National League West with a 71–91 record, 19½ games behind the Cincinnati Reds.

== Offseason ==
- December 4, 1978: Max Venable was drafted by the Giants from the Los Angeles Dodgers in the 1978 rule 5 draft.
- December 5, 1978: Darrell Evans was signed as a free agent by the Giants.
- February 24, 1979: Bill Bordley was signed as an amateur free agent by the Giants.

== Regular season ==
=== Season standings ===
NL West
Team	W	L	Pct.	GB	Home	Road
Cincinnati Reds	90	71	.559	—	48‍–‍32	42‍–‍39
Houston Astros	89	73	.549	1½	52‍–‍29	37‍–‍44
Los Angeles Dodgers	79	83	.488	11½	46‍–‍35	33‍–‍48
San Francisco Giants	71	91	.438	19½	38‍–‍43	33‍–‍48
San Diego Padres	68	93	.422	22	39‍–‍42	29‍–‍51
Atlanta Braves	66	94	.412	23½	34‍–‍45	32‍–‍49

=== Record vs. opponents ===
1979 National League record Sources:
Team	ATL	CHC	CIN	HOU	LAD	MON	NYM	PHI	PIT	SD	SF	STL
Atlanta	—	4–8	6–12	7–11	12–6	1–9	4–8	7–5	4–8	6–12	11–7	4–8
Chicago	8–4	—	7–5	6–6	5–7	6–12	8–10	9–9	6–12	9–3	8–4	8–10
Cincinnati	12–6	5–7	—	8–10	11–7	6–6	8–4	8–4	8–4	10–7	6–12	8–4
Houston	11–7	6–6	10–8	—	10–8	7–5	9–3	5–7	4–8	14–4	7–11	6–6
Los Angeles	6–12	7–5	7–11	8–10	—	6–6	9–3	3–9	4–8	9–9	14–4	6–6
Montreal	9–1	12–6	6–6	5–7	6–6	—	15–3	11–7	7–11	7–5	7–5	10–8
New York	8–4	10–8	4–8	3–9	3–9	3–15	—	5–13	8–10	4–8	8–4	7–11
Philadelphia	5–7	9–9	4–8	7–5	9–3	7–11	13–5	—	8–10	9–3	6–6	7–11
Pittsburgh	8–4	12–6	4–8	8–4	8–4	11–7	10–8	10–8	—	7–5	9–3	11–7
San Diego	12–6	3–9	7–10	4–14	9–9	5–7	8–4	3–9	5–7	—	8–10	4–8
San Francisco	7–11	4–8	12–6	11–7	4–14	5–7	4–8	6–6	3–9	10–8	—	5–7
St. Louis	8–4	10–8	4–8	6–6	6–6	8–10	11–7	11–7	7–11	8–4	7–5	—

=== Opening Day starters ===
- Vida Blue
- Jack Clark
- Darrell Evans
- Marc Hill
- Mike Ivie
- Bill Madlock
- Roger Metzger
- Billy North
- Terry Whitfield

=== Notable transactions ===
- April 1, 1979: Joe Coleman was signed as a free agent by the Giants.
- April 21, 1979: Joe Coleman was released by the Giants.
- June 5, 1979: Scott Garrelts was drafted by the Giants in the 1st round (15th pick) of the 1979 Major League Baseball draft.
- June 13, 1979: John Tamargo was traded by the Giants to the Montreal Expos for a player to be named later and cash. The Expos completed the deal by sending Joe Pettini to the Giants on March 15, 1980.
- June 17, 1979: Dan Gladden was signed by the Giants as an amateur free agent.
- June 28, 1979: Bill Madlock, Lenny Randle and Dave Roberts were traded by the Giants to the Pittsburgh Pirates for Ed Whitson, Fred Breining, and Al Holland.
- June 28, 1979: Héctor Cruz was traded by the Giants to the Cincinnati Reds for Pedro Borbón.

=== Roster ===
1979 San Francisco Giants
Roster
Pitchers: 14 Vida Blue; 34 Pedro Borbón; 29 Joe Coleman; 40 John Curtis; 43 Tom Griffin; 28 Ed Halicki; 19 Al Holland; 39 Bob Knepper; 46 Gary Lavelle; 38 Greg Minton; 17 Randy Moffitt; 26 John Montefusco; 25 Philip Nastu; 37 Ed Plank; 25 Dave Roberts; 32 Ed Whitson	Catchers: 2 Marc Hill; 30 Bob Kearney; 47 Dennis Littlejohn; 3 Mike Sadek; 30 John Tamargo; Infielders: 21 Rob Andrews; 41 Darrell Evans; 15 Mike Ivie; 10 Johnnie LeMaster; 18 Bill Madlock; 44 Willie McCovey; 16 Roger Metzger; 20 Joe Strain	Outfielders: 22 Jack Clark; 9 Héctor Cruz; 31 Larry Herndon; 18 Greg Johnston; 36 Billy North; 49 Max Venable; 45 Terry Whitfield	Manager: 6 Joe Altobelli; 1 Dave Bristol; Coaches: 1 Dave Bristol (Third Base); 12 Jim Davenport (First Base/Third Base); 5 Tom Haller (Bullpen); -- Salty Parker (First Base); -- Hank Sauer (Hitting); 8 Larry Shepard (Pitching)

== Player stats ==
= Indicates team leader

=== Batting ===
==== Starters by position ====
Note: Pos = Position; G = Games played; AB = At bats; H = Hits; Avg. = Batting average; HR = Home runs; RBI = Runs batted in

Pos	Player	G	AB	H	Avg.	HR	RBI
C	Dennis Littlejohn	63	193	38	.197	1	13
1B	Willie McCovey	117	353	88	.249	15	57
2B	Joe Strain	67	257	62	.241	1	12
SS	Johnnie LeMaster	108	343	87	.254	3	29
3B	Darrell Evans	160	562	142	.253	17	70
LF	Terry Whitfield	133	394	113	.287	5	44
CF	Bill North	142	460	119	.259	5	30
RF	Jack Clark	143	527	144	.273	26	86

==== Other batters ====
Note: G = Games played; AB = At bats; H = Hits; Avg. = Batting average; HR = Home runs; RBI = Runs batted in

Player	G	AB	H	Avg.	HR	RBI
Mike Ivie	133	402	115	.286	27	89
Larry Herndon	132	354	91	.257	7	36
Roger Metzger	94	259	65	.251	0	31
Bill Madlock	69	249	65	.261	7	41
Marc Hill	63	169	35	.207	3	15
Rob Andrews	75	154	40	.260	2	13
Mike Sadek	63	126	30	.238	1	11
Max Venable	55	85	14	.165	0	3
Greg Johnston	42	74	15	.203	1	7
John Tamargo	30	60	12	.200	2	6
Héctor Cruz	16	25	3	.120	0	1
Bob Kearney	2	0	0	----	0	0

=== Pitching ===
==== Starting pitchers ====
Note: G = Games pitched; IP = Innings pitched; W = Wins; L = Losses; ERA = Earned run average; SO = Strikeouts

Player	G	IP	W	L	ERA	SO
Vida Blue	34	237.0	14	14	5.01	138
Bob Knepper	34	207.1	9	12	4.64	123
John Montefusco	22	137.0	3	8	3.94	76
John Curtis	27	120.2	10	9	4.18	85
Ed Whitson	18	100.1	5	8	3.95	62

==== Other pitchers ====
Note: G = Games pitched; IP = Innings pitched; W = Wins; L = Losses; ERA = Earned run average; SO = Strikeouts

Player	G	IP	W	L	ERA	SO
Ed Halicki	33	125.2	5	8	4.58	81
Phil Nastu	25	100.0	3	4	4.32	47

==== Relief pitchers ====
Note: G = Games pitched; W = Wins; L = Losses; SV = Saves; ERA = Earned run average; SO = Strikeouts

Player	G	W	L	SV	ERA	SO
Gary Lavelle	70	7	9	20	2.51	80
Tom Griffin	59	5	6	2	3.91	82
Greg Minton	46	4	3	4	1.81	33
Pedro Borbón	30	4	3	3	4.89	26
Randy Moffitt	28	2	5	2	7.71	16
Dave Roberts	26	0	2	3	2.57	23
Joe Coleman	5	0	0	0	0.00	0
Ed Plank	4	0	0	0	7.36	1
Al Holland	3	0	0	0	0.00	7

== Awards and honors ==
=== All-Stars ===
All-Star Game

- Jack Clark, Outfield, Reserve

== Farm system ==
Level	Team	League	Manager
AAA	Phoenix Giants	Pacific Coast League	Rocky Bridges
AA	Shreveport Captains	Texas League	Andy Gilbert
A	Fresno Giants	California League	Jack Mull
A	Cedar Rapids Giants	Midwest League	Wayne Cato
Rookie	Great Falls Giants	Pioneer League	Ernie Rodriguez
