= 1979 Atlanta Braves season =

1979 Atlanta Braves
- League: National League
- Division: West
- Ballpark: Atlanta–Fulton County Stadium
- City: Atlanta
- Record: 66–94 (.413)
- Divisional place: 6th
- Owners: Ted Turner
- General managers: Bill Lucas, John Mullen
- Managers: Bobby Cox
- Television: WTCG
- Radio: WSB (Ernie Johnson, Pete Van Wieren, Skip Caray)

The 1979 Atlanta Braves season was the 109th season for the franchise and their 14th in Atlanta.

== Offseason ==
- January 9, 1979: Brook Jacoby was drafted by the Braves in the 7th round of the 1979 Major League Baseball draft.
- February 22, 1979: Mike Davey was purchased from the Braves by the Seattle Mariners.
- March 31, 1979: Dave Campbell was traded by the Braves to the Montreal Expos for Pepe Frías.

== Regular season ==
=== Season standings ===
NL West
| Team | W | L | Pct. | GB | Home | Road |
|---|---|---|---|---|---|---|
| Cincinnati Reds | 90 | 71 | .559 | — | 48‍–‍32 | 42‍–‍39 |
| Houston Astros | 89 | 73 | .549 | 1½ | 52‍–‍29 | 37‍–‍44 |
| Los Angeles Dodgers | 79 | 83 | .488 | 11½ | 46‍–‍35 | 33‍–‍48 |
| San Francisco Giants | 71 | 91 | .438 | 19½ | 38‍–‍43 | 33‍–‍48 |
| San Diego Padres | 68 | 93 | .422 | 22 | 39‍–‍42 | 29‍–‍51 |
| Atlanta Braves | 66 | 94 | .412 | 23½ | 34‍–‍45 | 32‍–‍49 |

=== Record vs. opponents ===
1979 National League record Sources:
| Team | ATL | CHC | CIN | HOU | LAD | MON | NYM | PHI | PIT | SD | SF | STL |
|---|---|---|---|---|---|---|---|---|---|---|---|---|
| Atlanta | — | 4–8 | 6–12 | 7–11 | 12–6 | 1–9 | 4–8 | 7–5 | 4–8 | 6–12 | 11–7 | 4–8 |
| Chicago | 8–4 | — | 7–5 | 6–6 | 5–7 | 6–12 | 8–10 | 9–9 | 6–12 | 9–3 | 8–4 | 8–10 |
| Cincinnati | 12–6 | 5–7 | — | 8–10 | 11–7 | 6–6 | 8–4 | 8–4 | 8–4 | 10–7 | 6–12 | 8–4 |
| Houston | 11–7 | 6–6 | 10–8 | — | 10–8 | 7–5 | 9–3 | 5–7 | 4–8 | 14–4 | 7–11 | 6–6 |
| Los Angeles | 6–12 | 7–5 | 7–11 | 8–10 | — | 6–6 | 9–3 | 3–9 | 4–8 | 9–9 | 14–4 | 6–6 |
| Montreal | 9–1 | 12–6 | 6–6 | 5–7 | 6–6 | — | 15–3 | 11–7 | 7–11 | 7–5 | 7–5 | 10–8 |
| New York | 8–4 | 10–8 | 4–8 | 3–9 | 3–9 | 3–15 | — | 5–13 | 8–10 | 4–8 | 8–4 | 7–11 |
| Philadelphia | 5–7 | 9–9 | 4–8 | 7–5 | 9–3 | 7–11 | 13–5 | — | 8–10 | 9–3 | 6–6 | 7–11 |
| Pittsburgh | 8–4 | 12–6 | 4–8 | 8–4 | 8–4 | 11–7 | 10–8 | 10–8 | — | 7–5 | 9–3 | 11–7 |
| San Diego | 12–6 | 3–9 | 7–10 | 4–14 | 9–9 | 5–7 | 8–4 | 3–9 | 5–7 | — | 8–10 | 4–8 |
| San Francisco | 7–11 | 4–8 | 12–6 | 11–7 | 4–14 | 5–7 | 4–8 | 6–6 | 3–9 | 10–8 | — | 5–7 |
| St. Louis | 8–4 | 10–8 | 4–8 | 6–6 | 6–6 | 8–10 | 11–7 | 11–7 | 7–11 | 8–4 | 7–5 | — |

=== Death of GM Bill Lucas ===
On May 5, 1979, the Braves were staggered by the sudden death, at 43, of the club's general manager, Bill Lucas. The first African-American general manager in Major League Baseball, and the highest-ranking black executive in the game at the time of his death, he had been stricken at home May 2 with a massive cerebral hemorrhage, after watching a Braves' road-game victory on television.

Lucas had been the Braves' top baseball operations official since September 17, 1976, and on his watch the team introduced players who would be integral parts of its early 1980s contending teams—such as Dale Murphy, Bob Horner and Glenn Hubbard. During Lucas' term, the club had also hired Bobby Cox for his first term (1978–81) as manager. Lucas had been a player and executive with the Braves since 1957; his sister, Barbara, also was the former wife of Hall of Famer and Braves' legend Henry Aaron.

Lucas was succeeded May 16 by John Mullen, 54, a vice president with the Houston Astros since 1967 but previously a longtime member of the Braves' management team in Boston, Milwaukee and Atlanta. Mullen would serve as the Braves' general manager until his replacement, by Cox, in October 1985.

=== Notable transactions ===
- April 3, 1979: Buzz Capra was released by the Braves.
- June 5, 1979: 1979 Major League Baseball draft
  - Paul Runge was drafted by the Braves in the 9th round.
  - Brett Butler was drafted by the Braves in the 23rd round. Player signed June 11, 1979.

=== Roster ===
1979 Atlanta Braves
Roster
| Pitchers: 50 Tommy Boggs; 34 Larry Bradford; 43 Tony Brizzolara; 38 Adrian Devine; 45 Jamie Easterly; 26 Gene Garber; 49 Preston Hanna; 42 Frank LaCorte; 24 Mickey Mahler; 39 Rick Mahler; 29 Rick Matula; 32 Bo McLaughlin; 50 Joey McLaughlin; 27 Larry McWilliams; 35 Phil Niekro; 48 Craig Skok; 37 Eddie Solomon | Catchers: 20 Bruce Benedict; 11 Joe Nolan; 4 Biff Pocoroba; Infielders: 25 Bob Beall; 15 Darrel Chaney; 9 Pepe Frías; 5 Bob Horner; 17 Glenn Hubbard; 28 Mike Lum; 31 Mike Macha; 3 Dale Murphy; 1 Jerry Royster; 16 Jim Wessinger | Outfielders: 30 Brian Asselstine; 2 Barry Bonnell; 7 Jeff Burroughs; 36 Gary Matthews; 14 Eddie Miller; 22 Rowland Office; 46 Charlie Spikes; 18 Larry Whisenton | Manager: 6 Bobby Cox; Coaches: 23 Tommie Aaron; 48 Cloyd Boyer; 10 Bobby Dews; 8 Alex Grammas |

== Player stats ==
=== Batting ===
==== Starters by position ====
Note: Pos = Position; G = Games played; AB = At bats; H = Hits; Avg. = Batting average; HR = Home runs; RBI = Runs batted in

| Pos | Player | G | AB | H | Avg. | HR | RBI |
|---|---|---|---|---|---|---|---|
| C | Bruce Benedict | 76 | 204 | 46 | .225 | 0 | 15 |
| 1B | Dale Murphy | 104 | 384 | 106 | .276 | 21 | 57 |
| 2B | Glenn Hubbard | 97 | 325 | 75 | .231 | 3 | 29 |
| 3B | Bob Horner | 121 | 487 | 153 | .314 | 33 | 98 |
| SS | Pepe Frías | 140 | 475 | 123 | .259 | 1 | 44 |
| LF | Jeff Burroughs | 116 | 397 | 89 | .224 | 11 | 47 |
| CF | Rowland Office | 124 | 277 | 69 | .249 | 2 | 37 |
| RF | Gary Matthews | 156 | 631 | 192 | .304 | 27 | 90 |

==== Other batters ====
Note: G = Games played; AB = At bats; H = Hits; Avg. = Batting average; HR = Home runs; RBI = Runs batted in

| Player | G | AB | H | Avg. | HR | RBI |
|---|---|---|---|---|---|---|
| Jerry Royster | 154 | 601 | 164 | .273 | 3 | 51 |
| Barry Bonnell | 127 | 375 | 97 | .259 | 12 | 45 |
| Joe Nolan | 89 | 230 | 57 | .248 | 4 | 21 |
| Mike Lum | 111 | 217 | 54 | .249 | 6 | 27 |
| Darrel Chaney | 63 | 117 | 19 | .162 | 0 | 10 |
| Eddie Miller | 27 | 113 | 35 | .310 | 0 | 5 |
| Charlie Spikes | 66 | 93 | 26 | .280 | 3 | 21 |
| Biff Pocoroba | 28 | 38 | 12 | .316 | 0 | 4 |
| Larry Whisenton | 13 | 37 | 9 | .243 | 0 | 1 |
| Bob Beall | 17 | 15 | 2 | .133 | 0 | 1 |
| Mike Macha | 6 | 13 | 2 | .154 | 0 | 1 |
| Brian Asselstine | 8 | 10 | 1 | .100 | 0 | 0 |
| Jim Wessinger | 10 | 7 | 0 | .000 | 0 | 0 |

=== Pitching ===
==== Starting pitchers ====
Note: G = Games pitched; IP = Innings pitched; W = Wins; L = Losses; ERA = Earned run average; SO = Strikeouts

| Player | G | IP | W | L | ERA | SO |
|---|---|---|---|---|---|---|
| Phil Niekro | 44 | 342.0 | 21 | 20 | 3.39 | 208 |
| Eddie Solomon | 31 | 186.0 | 7 | 14 | 4.21 | 96 |
| Rick Matula | 28 | 171.1 | 8 | 10 | 4.15 | 67 |
| Tony Brizzolara | 20 | 107.1 | 6 | 9 | 5.28 | 64 |
| Larry McWilliams | 13 | 66.1 | 3 | 2 | 5.56 | 32 |
| Tommy Boggs | 3 | 12.2 | 0 | 2 | 6.39 | 1 |

==== Other pitchers ====
Note: G = Games pitched; IP = Innings pitched; W = Wins; L = Losses; ERA = Earned run average; SO = Strikeouts

| Player | G | IP | W | L | ERA | SO |
|---|---|---|---|---|---|---|
| Mickey Mahler | 26 | 100.0 | 5 | 11 | 5.85 | 71 |
| Preston Hanna | 6 | 24.1 | 1 | 1 | 2.96 | 15 |

==== Relief pitchers ====
Note: G = Games pitched; W = Wins; L = Losses; SV = Saves; ERA = Earned run average; SO = Strikeouts

| Player | G | W | L | SV | ERA | SO |
|---|---|---|---|---|---|---|
| Gene Garber | 68 | 6 | 16 | 25 | 4.33 | 56 |
| Craig Skok | 44 | 1 | 3 | 2 | 3.98 | 30 |
| Adrian Devine | 40 | 3 | 2 | 0 | 3.24 | 22 |
| Joey McLaughlin | 37 | 5 | 3 | 5 | 2.48 | 40 |
| Bo McLaughlin | 37 | 1 | 1 | 0 | 4.89 | 45 |
| Larry Bradford | 21 | 1 | 0 | 2 | 0.95 | 11 |
| Rick Mahler | 15 | 0 | 0 | 0 | 6.14 | 12 |
| Frank LaCorte | 6 | 0 | 0 | 0 | 7.56 | 6 |
| Jamie Easterly | 4 | 0 | 0 | 0 | 13.50 | 3 |

== Farm system ==
| Level | Team | League | Manager |
|---|---|---|---|
| AAA | Richmond Braves | International League | Tom Burgess |
| AA | Savannah Braves | Southern League | Eddie Haas |
| A | Greenwood Braves | Western Carolinas League | Al Gallagher |
| Rookie | Kingsport Braves | Appalachian League | Gene Hassell |
| Rookie | GCL Braves | Gulf Coast League | Pedro González |

LEAGUE CHAMPIONS: Greenwood

== Awards and honors ==
=== League leaders ===
- Phil Niekro, National League leader, Losses
