= Mike Mendoza =

Mike Mendoza may refer to:

- Mike Mendoza (broadcaster), British radio presenter and politician
- Mike Mendoza (wrestler), Puerto Rican professional wrestler
- Mike Mendoza (baseball), baseball player

== See also ==
- Michael Mendoza, American football quarterback
