= 1979 Montreal Expos season =

1979 Montreal Expos
- League: National League
- Division: East
- Ballpark: Olympic Stadium
- City: Montreal
- Record: 95–65 (.594)
- Divisional place: 2nd
- Owners: Charles Bronfman
- General managers: John McHale
- Managers: Dick Williams
- Television: CBC Television (Dave Van Horne, Duke Snider); Télévision de Radio-Canada (Jean-Pierre Roy, Guy Ferron)
- Radio: CFCF (English) (Dave Van Horne, Duke Snider); CKAC (French) (Claude Raymond, Jacques Doucet)

The 1979 Montreal Expos season was the 11th in franchise history. The team finished second in the National League East with a record of 95–65, 2 games behind the first-place Pittsburgh Pirates. The 1979 season was the Expos' first winning season in franchise history (and it would be the most wins they would have in a season in the team's history before they relocated).

== Offseason ==
- November 28, 1978: Duffy Dyer was signed as a free agent by the Expos.
- December 4, 1978: Ken Macha was drafted by the Expos from the Pittsburgh Pirates in the 1978 rule 5 draft.
- December 7, 1978: Stan Papi was traded by the Expos to the Boston Red Sox for Bill Lee.
- December 8, 1978: Mike Hart was traded by the Expos to the Texas Rangers for Jim Mason.
- December 9, 1978: Randy St. Claire was signed by the Expos as an amateur free agent.
- December 14, 1978: Sam Mejías was traded by the Expos to the Chicago Cubs for Jerry White and Rodney Scott.
- March 30, 1979: Mike Garman was released by the Expos.
- March 31, 1979: Pepe Frías was traded by the Expos to the Atlanta Braves for Dave Campbell.

== Spring training ==
The Expos held spring training at City Island Ball Park in Daytona Beach, Florida. It was their seventh season there.

== Regular season ==
=== Season standings ===
NL East
Team	W	L	Pct.	GB	Home	Road
Pittsburgh Pirates	98	64	.605	—	48‍–‍33	50‍–‍31
Montreal Expos	95	65	.594	2	56‍–‍25	39‍–‍40
St. Louis Cardinals	86	76	.531	12	42‍–‍39	44‍–‍37
Philadelphia Phillies	84	78	.519	14	43‍–‍38	41‍–‍40
Chicago Cubs	80	82	.494	18	45‍–‍36	35‍–‍46
New York Mets	63	99	.389	35	28‍–‍53	35‍–‍46

=== Record vs. opponents ===
1979 National League record Sources:
Team	ATL	CHC	CIN	HOU	LAD	MON	NYM	PHI	PIT	SD	SF	STL
Atlanta	—	4–8	6–12	7–11	12–6	1–9	4–8	7–5	4–8	6–12	11–7	4–8
Chicago	8–4	—	7–5	6–6	5–7	6–12	8–10	9–9	6–12	9–3	8–4	8–10
Cincinnati	12–6	5–7	—	8–10	11–7	6–6	8–4	8–4	8–4	10–7	6–12	8–4
Houston	11–7	6–6	10–8	—	10–8	7–5	9–3	5–7	4–8	14–4	7–11	6–6
Los Angeles	6–12	7–5	7–11	8–10	—	6–6	9–3	3–9	4–8	9–9	14–4	6–6
Montreal	9–1	12–6	6–6	5–7	6–6	—	15–3	11–7	7–11	7–5	7–5	10–8
New York	8–4	10–8	4–8	3–9	3–9	3–15	—	5–13	8–10	4–8	8–4	7–11
Philadelphia	5–7	9–9	4–8	7–5	9–3	7–11	13–5	—	8–10	9–3	6–6	7–11
Pittsburgh	8–4	12–6	4–8	8–4	8–4	11–7	10–8	10–8	—	7–5	9–3	11–7
San Diego	12–6	3–9	7–10	4–14	9–9	5–7	8–4	3–9	5–7	—	8–10	4–8
San Francisco	7–11	4–8	12–6	11–7	4–14	5–7	4–8	6–6	3–9	10–8	—	5–7
St. Louis	8–4	10–8	4–8	6–6	6–6	8–10	11–7	11–7	7–11	8–4	7–5	—

=== Opening Day lineup ===
- Andre Dawson, CF
- Rodney Scott, 2B
- Warren Cromartie, LF
- Ellis Valentine, RF
- Tony Pérez, 1B
- Gary Carter, C
- Larry Parrish, 3B
- Chris Speier, SS
- Steve Rogers, P

=== Notable transactions ===
- June 13, 1979: The Expos traded a player to be named later and cash to the San Francisco Giants for John Tamargo. The Expos completed the deal by sending Joe Pettini to the Giants on March 15, 1980.
- July 20, 1979: The Expos traded a player to be named later and cash to the Detroit Tigers for Rusty Staub. The Expos completed the deal by sending Randy Schafer (minors) to the Tigers on December 3.

=== Youppi! ===
Youppi!, a creation of Acme Mascots, Inc. (a division of Harrison/Erickson, Inc.), was commissioned by Expos vice-president Roger D. Landry. Originally leased by the team in 1979, the mascot was eventually purchased by the Expos and represented the team.

=== Roster ===
1979 Montreal Expos
**Roster**
**Pitchers**: 42 Bill Atkinson; 22 Stan Bahnsen; 35 Woodie Fryman; 48 Ross Grimsley; 34 Bill Gullickson; 20 Bob James; 37 Bill Lee; 43 Rudy May; 29 Dale Murray; 46 Dave Palmer; 45 Steve Rogers; 21 Scott Sanderson; 36 Dan Schatzeder; 27 Elías Sosa	**Catchers**: 8 Gary Carter; 5 Duffy Dyer; 47 John Tamargo; **Infielders**: 57 Randy Bass; 7 Tony Bernazard; 30 Dave Cash; 14 Tommy Hutton; 31 Ken Macha; 12 Jim Mason; 15 Larry Parrish; 24 Tony Pérez; 3 Rodney Scott; 25 Tony Solaita; 4 Chris Speier; 6 Rusty Staub	**Outfielders**: 49 Warren Cromartie; 10 Andre Dawson; 17 Ellis Valentine; 18 Jerry White; **Other batters**: 32 Tim Raines	**Manager**: 23 Dick Williams; **Coaches**: 16 Felipe Alou (Third base); 2 Jim Brewer (Pitching); 58 Pat Mullin (Hitting); 40 Norm Sherry (Bullpen); 9 Vern Rapp (Bench); 1 Ozzie Virgil (First base)

=== Game log ===
1979 Game Log: 95–65 (Home: 56–25; Away: 39–40)
April: 14–5 (Home: 10–1; Away: 4–4)

#	Date	Opponent	Score	Win	Loss	Save	Attendance	Record	Streak

May: 15–10 (Home: 7–2; Away: 8–8)

#	Date	Opponent	Score	Win	Loss	Save	Attendance	Record	Streak

June: 14–12 (Home: 9–3; Away: 5–9)

#	Date	Opponent	Score	Win	Loss	Save	Attendance	Record	Streak

July: 14–16 (Home: 8–10; Away: 6–6)

#	Date	Opponent	Score	Win	Loss	Save	Attendance	Record	Streak

August: 15–11 (Home: 10–3; Away: 5–8)

#	Date	Opponent	Score	Win	Loss	Save	Attendance	Record	Streak

September: 23–11 (Home: 12–6; Away: 11–5)

#	Date	Opponent	Score	Win	Loss	Save	Attendance	Record	Streak

Legend: = Win = Loss = Postponement
Bold = Expos team member

== Player stats ==
= Indicates team leader

=== Batting ===
==== Starters by position ====
Note: Pos = Position; G = Games played; AB = At bats; H = Hits; Avg. = Batting average; HR = Home runs; RBI = Runs batted in

Pos	Player	G	AB	H	Avg.	HR	RBI
C	Gary Carter	141	505	143	.283	22	75
1B	Tony Perez	132	489	132	.270	13	73
2B	Rodney Scott	151	562	134	.238	3	42
SS	Chris Speier	113	344	78	.227	7	26
3B	Larry Parrish	153	544	167	.307	30	82
LF	Warren Cromartie	158	659	181	.275	8	46
CF	Andre Dawson	155	639	176	.275	25	92
RF	Ellis Valentine	146	548	151	.276	21	82

==== Other batters ====
Note: G = Games played; AB = At bats; H = Hits; Avg. = Batting average; HR = Home runs; RBI = Runs batted in

Player	G	AB	H	Avg.	HR	RBI
Dave Cash	76	187	60	.321	2	19
Jerry White	88	138	41	.297	3	18
Rusty Staub	38	86	23	.267	3	14
Tommy Hutton	86	83	21	.253	1	13
Duffy Dyer	28	74	18	.243	1	8
Jim Mason	40	71	13	.183	0	6
Tony Solaita	29	42	12	.286	1	7
Tony Bernazard	22	40	12	.300	1	8
Ken Macha	20	36	10	.278	0	4
John Tamargo	12	21	8	.381	0	5
Randy Bass	2	1	0	.000	0	0
Tim Raines	6	0	0	----	0	0

=== Pitching ===
==== Starting pitchers ====
Note: G = Games pitched; IP = Innings pitched; W = Wins; L = Losses; ERA = Earned run average; SO = Strikeouts

Player	G	IP	W	L	ERA	SO
Steve Rogers	37	248.2	13	12	3.00	143
Bill Lee	33	222.0	16	10	3.04	59
Scott Sanderson	24	168.0	9	8	3.43	138
Dan Schatzeder	21	162.0	10	5	2.83	106
Ross Grimsley	27	151.1	10	9	5.35	42

==== Other pitchers ====
Note: G = Games pitched; IP = Innings pitched; W = Wins; L = Losses; ERA = Earned run average; SO = Strikeouts

Player	G	IP	W	L	ERA	SO
David Palmer	36	122.2	10	2	2.63	72
Rudy May	33	93.2	10	3	2.31	67

==== Relief pitchers ====
Note: G = Games pitched; W = Wins; L = Losses; SV = Saves; ERA = Earned run average; SO = Strikeouts

Player	G	W	L	SV	ERA	SO
Elias Sosa	62	8	7	18	1.96	59
Stan Bahnsen	51	3	1	5	3.15	71
Woodie Fryman	44	3	6	10	2.79	44
Bill Atkinson	10	2	0	1	1.98	7
Dale Murray	9	1	2	1	2.70	4
Bob James	2	0	0	0	13.50	1
Bill Gullickson	1	0	0	0	0.00	0

== Awards and honors ==
- Dick Williams, Associated Press NL Manager of the Year

=== All-Stars ===
1979 Major League Baseball All-Star Game

- Gary Carter, Catcher - Reserve
- Larry Parrish, Infield - Reserve
- Steve Rogers, Putcher - Reserve

== Farm system ==
Level	Team	League	Manager
AAA	Denver Bears	American Association	Jack McKeon
AA	Memphis Chicks	Southern League	Billy Gardner
A	West Palm Beach Expos	Florida State League	Larry Bearnarth
Short-Season A	Jamestown Expos	New York–Penn League	Pat Daugherty
Rookie	Calgary Expos	Pioneer League	Bob Bailey
