= 1979 Cincinnati Reds season =

1979 Cincinnati Reds
- National League West champions
- League: National League
- Division: West
- Ballpark: Riverfront Stadium
- City: Cincinnati
- Record: 90–71 (.559)
- Divisional place: 1st
- Owners: Louis Nippert
- General managers: Dick Wagner
- Managers: John McNamara
- Television: WLWT (Ray Lane, Bill Brown)
- Radio: WLW (Marty Brennaman, Joe Nuxhall)

The 1979 Cincinnati Reds season was the 110th season for the franchise in Major League Baseball, and their 10th and 9th full season at Riverfront Stadium. The Reds won the National League West under their first-year manager John McNamara, with a record of 90–71, 1½ games better than the Houston Astros. It was a year of great change for the Reds, who lost long-time star Pete Rose to the Philadelphia Phillies, who signed Rose as an unrestricted free agent. Also, long-time manager and future Hall of Famer Sparky Anderson was fired by new general manager Dick Wagner when Anderson refused to make changes in his coaching staff. McNamara guided the Reds to its first West Division title in three years. Wagner replaced long-time GM Bob Howsam, who retired after running the Reds for 12 years. Through some good drafts and several key trades, Howsam built a team that won six division titles, and played in four World Series, winning two, during the 1970s.

However, the Reds lost the NLCS to the eventual World Series champion Pittsburgh Pirates in three straight games. It was the first time in four tries the Pirates had upended the Reds in a league championship series since Major League Baseball began divisional play in 1969. It would be Cincinnati's last postseason appearance until 1990.

The Reds played their home games at Riverfront Stadium.

== Offseason ==
- January 9, 1979: Bill Bordley was drafted by the Reds in 1979, but the pick was voided.

== Regular season ==
=== Season standings ===
NL West
| Team | W | L | Pct. | GB | Home | Road |
|---|---|---|---|---|---|---|
| Cincinnati Reds | 90 | 71 | .559 | — | 48‍–‍32 | 42‍–‍39 |
| Houston Astros | 89 | 73 | .549 | 1½ | 52‍–‍29 | 37‍–‍44 |
| Los Angeles Dodgers | 79 | 83 | .488 | 11½ | 46‍–‍35 | 33‍–‍48 |
| San Francisco Giants | 71 | 91 | .438 | 19½ | 38‍–‍43 | 33‍–‍48 |
| San Diego Padres | 68 | 93 | .422 | 22 | 39‍–‍42 | 29‍–‍51 |
| Atlanta Braves | 66 | 94 | .412 | 23½ | 34‍–‍45 | 32‍–‍49 |

=== Record vs. opponents ===
1979 National League record Sources:
| Team | ATL | CHC | CIN | HOU | LAD | MON | NYM | PHI | PIT | SD | SF | STL |
|---|---|---|---|---|---|---|---|---|---|---|---|---|
| Atlanta | — | 4–8 | 6–12 | 7–11 | 12–6 | 1–9 | 4–8 | 7–5 | 4–8 | 6–12 | 11–7 | 4–8 |
| Chicago | 8–4 | — | 7–5 | 6–6 | 5–7 | 6–12 | 8–10 | 9–9 | 6–12 | 9–3 | 8–4 | 8–10 |
| Cincinnati | 12–6 | 5–7 | — | 8–10 | 11–7 | 6–6 | 8–4 | 8–4 | 8–4 | 10–7 | 6–12 | 8–4 |
| Houston | 11–7 | 6–6 | 10–8 | — | 10–8 | 7–5 | 9–3 | 5–7 | 4–8 | 14–4 | 7–11 | 6–6 |
| Los Angeles | 6–12 | 7–5 | 7–11 | 8–10 | — | 6–6 | 9–3 | 3–9 | 4–8 | 9–9 | 14–4 | 6–6 |
| Montreal | 9–1 | 12–6 | 6–6 | 5–7 | 6–6 | — | 15–3 | 11–7 | 7–11 | 7–5 | 7–5 | 10–8 |
| New York | 8–4 | 10–8 | 4–8 | 3–9 | 3–9 | 3–15 | — | 5–13 | 8–10 | 4–8 | 8–4 | 7–11 |
| Philadelphia | 5–7 | 9–9 | 4–8 | 7–5 | 9–3 | 7–11 | 13–5 | — | 8–10 | 9–3 | 6–6 | 7–11 |
| Pittsburgh | 8–4 | 12–6 | 4–8 | 8–4 | 8–4 | 11–7 | 10–8 | 10–8 | — | 7–5 | 9–3 | 11–7 |
| San Diego | 12–6 | 3–9 | 7–10 | 4–14 | 9–9 | 5–7 | 8–4 | 3–9 | 5–7 | — | 8–10 | 4–8 |
| San Francisco | 7–11 | 4–8 | 12–6 | 11–7 | 4–14 | 5–7 | 4–8 | 6–6 | 3–9 | 10–8 | — | 5–7 |
| St. Louis | 8–4 | 10–8 | 4–8 | 6–6 | 6–6 | 8–10 | 11–7 | 11–7 | 7–11 | 8–4 | 7–5 | — |

=== Notable transactions ===
- May 8, 1979: Paul Blair was signed as a free agent by the Reds.
- May 25, 1979: Champ Summers was traded by the Reds to the Detroit Tigers for a player to be named later. The Tigers completed the deal by sending Sheldon Burnside to the Reds on October 25.
- June 5, 1979: Jeff Jones was drafted by the Reds in the 20th round of the 1979 Major League Baseball draft.
- June 28, 1979: Pedro Borbón was traded by the Reds to the San Francisco Giants for Héctor Cruz.

=== Roster ===
1979 Cincinnati Reds
Roster
| Pitchers: 40 Doug Bair; 42 Bill Bonham; 34 Pedro Borbón; 44 Doug Capilla; 47 Tom Hume; 51 Mike LaCoss; 44 Charlie Leibrandt; 31 Paul Moskau; 34 Fred Norman; 35 Frank Pastore; 45 Manny Sarmiento; 41 Tom Seaver; 36 Mario Soto; 37,43 Dave Tomlin | Catchers: 5 Johnny Bench; 9 Vic Correll; Infielders: 23 Rick Auerbach; 13 Dave Concepción; 21 Arturo DeFreites; 22 Dan Driessen; 26 Junior Kennedy; 25 Ray Knight; 8 Joe Morgan; 16 Ron Oester; 12 Harry Spilman | Outfielders: 33 Paul Blair; 29 Dave Collins; 7 Héctor Cruz; 15 George Foster; 20 César Gerónimo; 30 Ken Griffey; 16,19 Ken Henderson; 28 Sam Mejías; 28 Champ Summers; Other batters: 21 Rafael Santo Domingo | Manager: 3 John McNamara; Coaches: 4 Harry Dunlop; 6 Bill Fischer; 2 Russ Nixon; 11 Ron Plaza |

== Player stats ==
=== Batting ===
==== Starters by position ====
Note: Pos = Position; G = Games played; AB = At bats; H = Hits; Avg. = Batting average; HR = Home runs; RBI = Runs batted in

| Pos | Player | G | AB | H | Avg. | HR | RBI |
|---|---|---|---|---|---|---|---|
| C | Johnny Bench | 130 | 464 | 128 | .276 | 22 | 80 |
| 1B | Dan Driessen | 150 | 515 | 129 | .250 | 18 | 75 |
| 2B | Joe Morgan | 127 | 436 | 109 | .250 | 9 | 32 |
| 3B | Ray Knight | 150 | 551 | 175 | .318 | 10 | 79 |
| SS | Dave Concepción | 149 | 590 | 166 | .281 | 16 | 84 |
| LF | George Foster | 121 | 440 | 133 | .302 | 30 | 98 |
| CF | César Gerónimo | 123 | 356 | 85 | .239 | 4 | 38 |
| RF | Ken Griffey | 95 | 380 | 120 | .316 | 8 | 32 |

==== Other batters ====
Note: G = Games played; AB = At bats; H = Hits; Avg. = Batting average; HR = Home runs; RBI = Runs batted in

| Player | G | AB | H | Avg. | HR | RBI |
|---|---|---|---|---|---|---|
| Dave Collins | 122 | 396 | 126 | .318 | 3 | 35 |
| Junior Kennedy | 83 | 220 | 60 | .273 | 1 | 17 |
| Héctor Cruz | 74 | 182 | 44 | .242 | 4 | 27 |
| Paul Blair | 75 | 140 | 21 | .150 | 2 | 15 |
| Rick Auerbach | 62 | 100 | 21 | .210 | 1 | 12 |
| Champ Summers | 27 | 60 | 12 | .200 | 1 | 11 |
| Harry Spilman | 43 | 56 | 12 | .214 | 0 | 5 |
| Arturo DeFreites | 23 | 34 | 7 | .206 | 0 | 4 |
| Ken Henderson | 10 | 13 | 3 | .231 | 0 | 2 |
| Rafael Santo Domingo | 7 | 6 | 1 | .167 | 0 | 0 |
| Ron Oester | 6 | 3 | 0 | .000 | 0 | 0 |
| Sam Mejias | 7 | 2 | 1 | .500 | 0 | 0 |

=== Pitching ===
==== Starting pitchers ====
Note: G = Games pitched; IP = Innings pitched; W = Wins; L = Losses; ERA = Earned run average; SO = Strikeouts

| Player | G | IP | W | L | ERA | SO |
|---|---|---|---|---|---|---|
| Tom Seaver | 32 | 215.0 | 16 | 6 | 3.14 | 131 |
| Mike LaCoss | 35 | 205.2 | 14 | 8 | 3.50 | 73 |
| Fred Norman | 34 | 195.1 | 11 | 13 | 3.64 | 95 |
| Bill Bonham | 29 | 175.2 | 9 | 7 | 3.79 | 78 |

==== Other pitchers ====
Note: G = Games pitched; IP = Innings pitched; W = Wins; L = Losses; ERA = Earned run average; SO = Strikeouts

| Player | G | IP | W | L | ERA | SO |
|---|---|---|---|---|---|---|
| Tom Hume | 57 | 163.0 | 10 | 9 | 2.76 | 80 |
| Paul Moskau | 21 | 106.0 | 5 | 4 | 3.89 | 58 |
| Frank Pastore | 30 | 95.1 | 6 | 7 | 4.25 | 63 |

Note: Tom Hume led the Reds in saves with 17.

==== Relief pitchers ====
Note: G = Games pitched; W = Wins; L = Losses; SV = Saves; ERA = Earned run average; SO = Strikeouts

| Player | G | W | L | SV | ERA | SO |
|---|---|---|---|---|---|---|
| Doug Bair | 65 | 11 | 7 | 16 | 4.29 | 86 |
| Dave Tomlin | 53 | 2 | 2 | 1 | 2.62 | 30 |
| Pedro Borbón | 30 | 2 | 2 | 2 | 3.43 | 23 |
| Mario Soto | 25 | 3 | 2 | 0 | 5.30 | 32 |
| Manny Sarmiento | 23 | 0 | 4 | 0 | 4.66 | 23 |
| Doug Capilla | 5 | 1 | 0 | 0 | 8.53 | 0 |
| Charlie Leibrandt | 3 | 0 | 0 | 0 | 0.00 | 1 |

== National League Championship Series ==
=== Game 1 ===
October 2, Riverfront Stadium

| Team | 1 | 2 | 3 | 4 | 5 | 6 | 7 | 8 | 9 | 10 | 11 | R | H | E |
|---|---|---|---|---|---|---|---|---|---|---|---|---|---|---|
| Pittsburgh | 0 | 0 | 2 | 0 | 0 | 0 | 0 | 0 | 0 | 0 | 3 | 5 | 10 | 0 |
| Cincinnati | 0 | 0 | 0 | 2 | 0 | 0 | 0 | 0 | 0 | 0 | 0 | 2 | 7 | 0 |
W: Grant Jackson (1–0) L: Tom Hume (0–1) SV: Don Robinson (1)
HRs: PIT – Phil Garner (1) Willie Stargell (1) CIN – George Foster (1)

=== Game 2 ===
October 3, Riverfront Stadium

| Team | 1 | 2 | 3 | 4 | 5 | 6 | 7 | 8 | 9 | 10 | R | H | E |
|---|---|---|---|---|---|---|---|---|---|---|---|---|---|
| Pittsburgh | 0 | 0 | 0 | 1 | 1 | 0 | 0 | 0 | 0 | 1 | 3 | 11 | 0 |
| Cincinnati | 0 | 1 | 0 | 0 | 0 | 0 | 0 | 0 | 1 | 0 | 2 | 8 | 0 |
W: Don Robinson (1–0) L: Doug Bair (0–1) SV: None
HRs: PIT – None CIN – None

=== Game 3 ===
October 5, Three Rivers Stadium

| Team | 1 | 2 | 3 | 4 | 5 | 6 | 7 | 8 | 9 | R | H | E |
|---|---|---|---|---|---|---|---|---|---|---|---|---|
| Cincinnati | 0 | 0 | 0 | 0 | 0 | 1 | 0 | 0 | 0 | 1 | 8 | 1 |
| Pittsburgh | 1 | 1 | 2 | 2 | 0 | 0 | 0 | 1 | X | 7 | 7 | 0 |
W: Bert Blyleven (1–0) L: Mike LaCoss (0–1) SV: None
HRs: CIN – Johnny Bench (1) PIT – Willie Stargell (2) Bill Madlock (1)

== Farm system ==
| Level | Team | League | Manager |
|---|---|---|---|
| AAA | Indianapolis Indians | American Association | Roy Majtyka |
| AA | Nashville Sounds | Southern League | George Scherger |
| A | Tampa Tarpons | Florida State League | Mike Compton |
| A | Greensboro Hornets | Western Carolinas League | Jim Lett |
| A-Short Season | Eugene Emeralds | Northwest League | Greg Riddoch |
| Rookie | Billings Mustangs | Pioneer League | Jim Hoff |

LEAGUE CHAMPIONS: Nashville
