= Dave Patterson =

American baseball player (born 1956)

- Pitcher
- Born: July 25, 1956 (age 70); Springfield, Missouri, U.S.
- Batted: Right Threw: Right

MLB debut
- June 9, 1979, for the Los Angeles Dodgers

Last MLB appearance
- September 27, 1979, for the Los Angeles Dodgers

MLB statistics
- Win–loss record: 4–1
- Earned run average: 5.26
- Strikeouts: 34
- Stats at Baseball Reference

Teams
- Los Angeles Dodgers (1979)

David Glenn Patterson (born July 25, 1956) is a former pitcher in Major League Baseball who made 36 relief appearances for the Los Angeles Dodgers in its 1979 season. Listed at 6' 0", 170 lb., Patterson batted and threw right handed. He was born in Springfield, Missouri.

Patterson attended Cerritos College and was drafted by the Dodgers in the 2nd round of the 1976 MLB draft.

He is a resident of Raytown, Missouri since 2016.
