= Gary Wilson (1970s pitcher) =

American baseball player (born 1954)

- Pitcher
- Born: November 21, 1954 (age 70); Camden, Arkansas
- Batted: Right Threw: Right

MLB debut
- April 13, 1979, for the Houston Astros

Last MLB appearance
- May 11, 1979, for the Houston Astros

MLB statistics
- Win–loss record: 0–0
- Earned run average: 12.27
- Strikeouts: 6
- Stats at Baseball Reference

Teams
- Houston Astros (1979)

Gary Steven Wilson (born November 21, 1954) is a former relief pitcher in Major League Baseball who played briefly for the Houston Astros in the 1979 season. Listed as 6' 2" tall and weighing185 lb., Wilson batted and threw right handed. He was born in Camden, Arkansas.
