= Tom Wiedenbauer =

American baseball player and coach

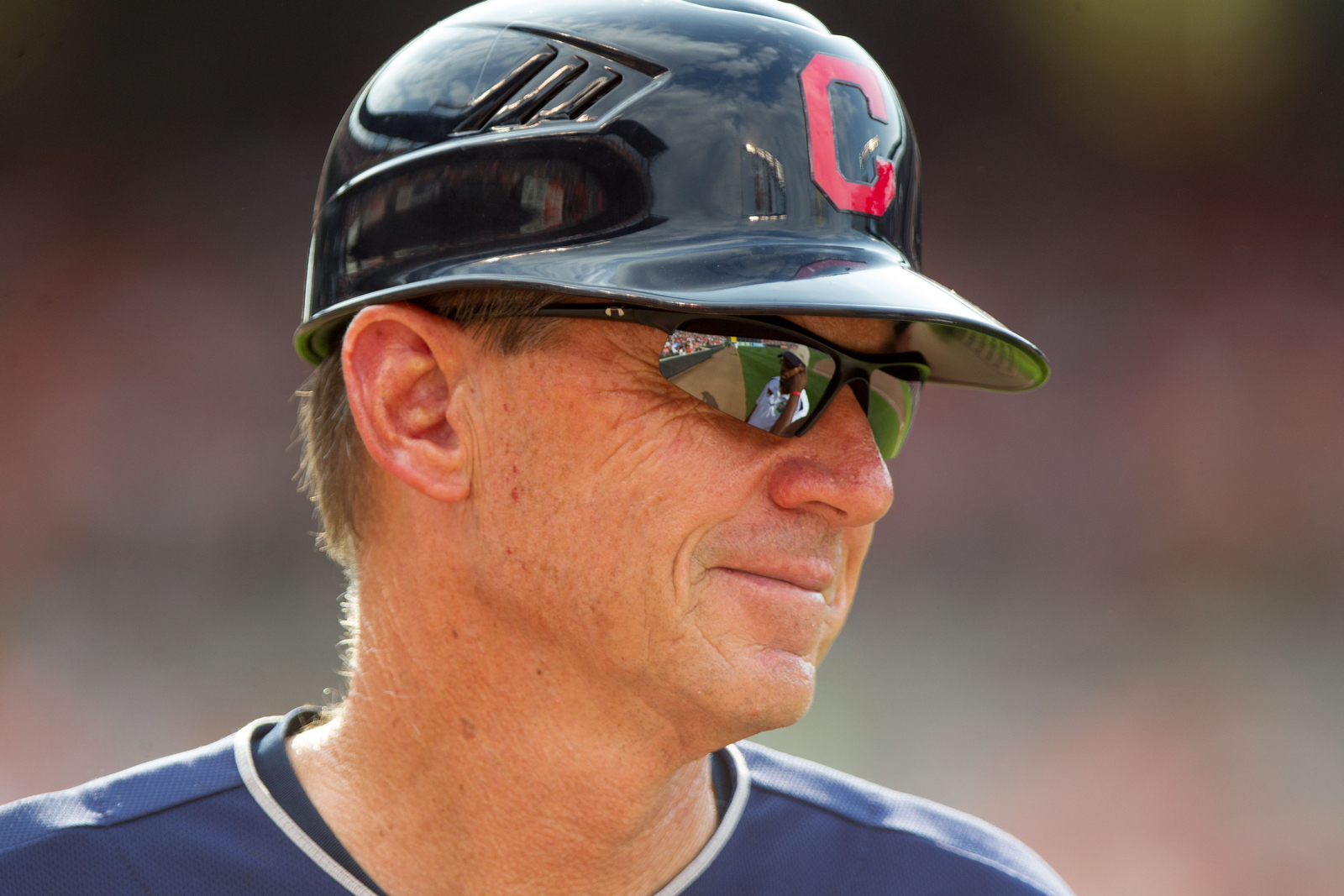
- Outfielder
- Born: November 5, 1958 (age 67); Menomonie, Wisconsin, U.S.
- Batted: Right Threw: Right

MLB debut
- September 14, 1979, for the Houston Astros

Last MLB appearance
- September 29, 1979, for the Houston Astros

MLB statistics
- Batting average: .667
- Hits: 4
- Runs batted in: 2
- Stats at Baseball Reference

Teams
- Houston Astros (1979)

Thomas John Wiedenbauer (born November 5, 1958) is an American former Major League Baseball outfielder and MLB first-base coach for the Cleveland Indians.

== Houston Astros ==
Wiedenbauer was drafted by the Houston Astros in the seventh round of the 1976 Major League Baseball draft. He played four games for the Astros as a September call-up during the 1979 season as an outfielder and pinch runner. He continued in the minor leagues for several years afterward (all in the Astros system), and was converted into a pitcher during the 1982 season. However, with the exception of one inning pitched in Triple-A, as a pitcher Wiedenbauer never made it past A ball (where he compiled a 10-11 record and an ERA of 5.00). Wiedenbauer retired following the 1983 season.

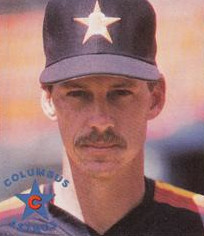
Tom Weidenbauer, Columbus Astros Manager 1988

After his playing career ended, Wiedenbauer remained with the Astros as a minor league coach. He was the manager of the Double-A Columbus Astros from 1987 to 1988. He served as an Astros minor league manager and instructor for the next 20-plus seasons.

== Cleveland Indians ==
Wiedenbauer joined the Cleveland Indians as minor league field coordinator in 2011. The Indians named him first base coach, with additional responsibilities for outfielders and baserunning, on October 14, 2011. Wiedenbauer served under Indians manager Manny Acta, with whom Wiedenbauer worked in the Astros organization in the 1980s and '90s. Wiedenbauer is currently a special assistant to the President of Baseball Operations and the General Manager.
