= Fred Breining =

American baseball player (born 1955)

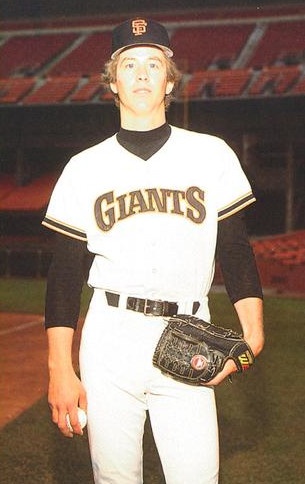
- Breining in 1983
- Pitcher
- Born: November 15, 1955 (age 69); San Francisco, California, U.S.
- Batted: Right Threw: Right

MLB debut
- September 4, 1980, for the San Francisco Giants

Last MLB appearance
- May 6, 1984, for the Montreal Expos

MLB statistics
- Win–loss record: 27–20
- Earned run average: 3.34
- Strikeouts: 260
- Stats at Baseball Reference

Teams
- San Francisco Giants (1980–1983); Montreal Expos (1984)

Fred Lawrence Breining (born November 15, 1955) is an American former pitcher in Major League Baseball who played from 1980 through 1985 for the San Francisco Giants and the Montreal Expos. He had been traded along with Ed Whitson and Al Holland from the Pittsburgh Pirates to the Giants for Bill Madlock, Lenny Randle and Dave Roberts on June 28, 1979. Breining won 27 games at the MLB level, and on September 23, 1981, he picked up his only major league save against the Dodgers. Breining pitched three shutout innings to preserve an 8–4 victory over their rival Los Angeles Dodgers.

His career was cut short when pitching to Ray Knight, when he fielded a bunt and threw it to first, only to blow out his shoulder. Breining never played another inning as a Major Leaguer. After that, he became an instructor at the Dusty Baker International Baseball Academy, and also offered private lessons in the Sacramento area along with Lloyd Moseby, who served as hitting coach.

== Sources ==
- Career statistics from Baseball Reference, or Fangraphs, or Baseball Reference (Minors), or Retrosheet
