= 1979 St. Louis Cardinals season =

Major League Baseball season

1979 St. Louis Cardinals
- League: National League
- Division: East
- Ballpark: Busch Memorial Stadium
- City: St. Louis, Missouri
- Record: 86–76 (.531)
- Divisional place: 3rd
- Owners: August "Gussie" Busch
- General managers: John Claiborne
- Managers: Ken Boyer
- Television: KSDK (as KSD-TV before September 8); KPLR (September 9 game only) (Jack Buck, Mike Shannon, Jay Randolph, Bob Starr)
- Radio: KMOX (Jack Buck, Mike Shannon, Bob Starr)

The 1979 St. Louis Cardinals season was the team's 98th season in St. Louis, Missouri and its 88th season in the National League. The Cardinals went 86–76 during the season and finished third in the National League East, 12 games behind the eventual NL pennant and World Series champion Pittsburgh Pirates.

== Offseason ==
- December 5, 1978: Pete Falcone was traded by the Cardinals to the New York Mets for Kim Seaman and Tom Grieve.
- January 9, 1979: Bill Mooneyham was drafted by the Cardinals in the 1st round (7th pick) of the secondary phase of the 1979 Major League Baseball draft, but did not sign.
- January 16, 1979: Darold Knowles was signed as a free agent by the Cardinals.
- January 16, 1979: Benny Ayala was traded by the Cardinals to the Baltimore Orioles for Mike Dimmel.
- February 19, 1979: Will McEnaney was signed as a free agent by the Cardinals.

== Regular season ==
First baseman Keith Hernández won the MVP Award this year, along with Willie Stargell, batting .344, with 11 home runs and 105 RBIs. Hernández also won the Gold Glove. Left fielder Lou Brock collected his 3,000th career hit and played his final season in MLB.

Pete Vuckovich and Silvio Martínez each won 15 games. Garry Templeton became the first switch-hitter to collect 100 hits from each side of the plate and led the league in triples for a third consecutive season.

=== Season standings ===
NL East
Team	W	L	Pct.	GB	Home	Road
Pittsburgh Pirates	98	64	.605	—	48‍–‍33	50‍–‍31
Montreal Expos	95	65	.594	2	56‍–‍25	39‍–‍40
St. Louis Cardinals	86	76	.531	12	42‍–‍39	44‍–‍37
Philadelphia Phillies	84	78	.519	14	43‍–‍38	41‍–‍40
Chicago Cubs	80	82	.494	18	45‍–‍36	35‍–‍46
New York Mets	63	99	.389	35	28‍–‍53	35‍–‍46

=== Record vs. opponents ===
1979 National League record Sources:
Team	ATL	CHC	CIN	HOU	LAD	MON	NYM	PHI	PIT	SD	SF	STL
Atlanta	—	4–8	6–12	7–11	12–6	1–9	4–8	7–5	4–8	6–12	11–7	4–8
Chicago	8–4	—	7–5	6–6	5–7	6–12	8–10	9–9	6–12	9–3	8–4	8–10
Cincinnati	12–6	5–7	—	8–10	11–7	6–6	8–4	8–4	8–4	10–7	6–12	8–4
Houston	11–7	6–6	10–8	—	10–8	7–5	9–3	5–7	4–8	14–4	7–11	6–6
Los Angeles	6–12	7–5	7–11	8–10	—	6–6	9–3	3–9	4–8	9–9	14–4	6–6
Montreal	9–1	12–6	6–6	5–7	6–6	—	15–3	11–7	7–11	7–5	7–5	10–8
New York	8–4	10–8	4–8	3–9	3–9	3–15	—	5–13	8–10	4–8	8–4	7–11
Philadelphia	5–7	9–9	4–8	7–5	9–3	7–11	13–5	—	8–10	9–3	6–6	7–11
Pittsburgh	8–4	12–6	4–8	8–4	8–4	11–7	10–8	10–8	—	7–5	9–3	11–7
San Diego	12–6	3–9	7–10	4–14	9–9	5–7	8–4	3–9	5–7	—	8–10	4–8
San Francisco	7–11	4–8	12–6	11–7	4–14	5–7	4–8	6–6	3–9	10–8	—	5–7
St. Louis	8–4	10–8	4–8	6–6	6–6	8–10	11–7	11–7	7–11	8–4	7–5	—

=== Opening Day starters ===
- Lou Brock
- John Denny
- George Hendrick
- Keith Hernandez
- Ken Reitz
- Tony Scott
- Ted Simmons
- Garry Templeton
- Mike Tyson

=== Notable transactions ===
- June 5, 1979: Andy Van Slyke was drafted by the Cardinals in the 1st round (6th pick) of the 1979 Major League Baseball draft.

=== Roster ===
1979 St. Louis Cardinals
Roster
Pitchers: 49 Tom Bruno; 36 John Denny; 31 Bob Forsch; 39 George Frazier; 41 John Fulgham; 34 Darold Knowles; 32 Mark Littell; 35 Silvio Martínez; 47 Will McEnaney; 26 Dan O'Brien; 22 Buddy Schultz; 48 Kim Seaman; 42 Bob Sykes; 43 Roy Thomas; 38 John Urrea; 46 Pete Vuckovich	Catchers: 16 Terry Kennedy; 23 Ted Simmons; 9 Steve Swisher; Infielders: 7 Roger Freed; 37 Keith Hernandez; 28 Tom Herr; 24 Ken Oberkfell; 5 Mike Phillips; 44 Ken Reitz; 1 Garry Templeton; 4 Mike Tyson	Outfielders: 20 Lou Brock; 11 Bernie Carbo; 21 Mike Dimmel; 3 Tom Grieve; 25 George Hendrick; 19 Dane Iorg; 21 Jim Lentine; 29 Jerry Mumphrey; 30 Tony Scott; 3 Keith Smith	Manager: 14 Ken Boyer; Coaches: 8 Jack Krol; 27 Dal Maxvill; 18 Claude Osteen; 2 Red Schoendienst; 15 Dave Ricketts

== Player stats ==
=== Batting ===
==== Starters by position ====
Note: Pos = Position; G = Games played; AB = At bats; H = Hits; Avg. = Batting average; HR = Home runs; RBI = Runs batted in

Pos	Player	G	AB	H	Avg.	HR	RBI
C	Ted Simmons	123	448	127	.283	26	87
1B	Keith Hernandez	161	610	210	.344	11	105
2B	Ken Oberkfell	135	369	111	.301	1	35
SS	Garry Templeton	154	672	211	.314	9	62
3B	Ken Reitz	159	605	162	.268	8	73
LF	Lou Brock	120	405	123	.304	5	38
CF	Tony Scott	153	587	152	.259	6	68
RF	George Hendrick	140	493	148	.300	16	75

==== Other batters ====
Note: G = Games played; AB = At bats; H = Hits; Avg. = Batting average; HR = Home runs; RBI = Runs batted in

Player	G	AB	H	Avg.	HR	RBI
Jerry Mumphrey	124	339	100	.295	3	32
Mike Tyson	75	190	42	.221	5	20
Dane Iorg	79	179	52	.291	1	21
Terry Kennedy	33	109	31	.284	2	17
Mike Phillips	44	97	22	.227	1	6
Steve Swisher	38	73	11	.151	1	3
Bernie Carbo	52	64	18	.281	3	12
Roger Freed	34	31	8	.258	2	8
Jim Lentine	11	23	9	.391	0	1
Tom Grieve	9	15	3	.200	0	0
Keith Smith	6	13	3	.231	0	0
Tom Herr	14	10	2	.200	0	1
Mike Dimmel	6	3	1	.333	0	0

=== Pitching ===
==== Starting pitchers ====
Note: G = Games pitched; IP = Innings pitched; W = Wins; L = Losses; ERA = Earned run average; SO = Strikeouts

Player	G	IP	W	L	ERA	SO
Pete Vuckovich	34	233.0	15	10	3.59	145
Bob Forsch	33	218.2	11	11	3.83	92
Silvio Martínez	32	206.2	15	8	3.27	102
John Denny	31	206.0	8	11	4.85	99
John Fulgham	20	146.0	10	6	2.53	75
Bob Sykes	13	67.0	4	3	6.18	35

==== Other pitchers ====
Note: G = Games pitched; IP = Innings pitched; W = Wins; L = Losses; ERA = Earned run average; SO = Strikeouts

Player	G	IP	W	L	ERA	SO
Roy Thomas	26	77.0	3	4	2.92	44
John Urrea	3	11.1	0	0	3.97	5

==== Relief pitchers ====
Note: G = Games pitched; W = Wins; L = Losses; SV = Saves; ERA = Earned run average; SO = Strikeouts

Player	G	W	L	SV	ERA	SO
Mark Littell	63	9	4	13	2.19	67
Darold Knowles	48	2	5	6	4.07	22
Will McEnaney	45	0	3	2	2.95	15
Buddy Schultz	31	4	3	3	4.46	38
Tom Bruno	27	2	3	0	4.23	27
George Frazier	25	2	4	0	4.45	14
Dan O'Brien	6	1	1	0	8.18	5
Kim Seaman	1	0	0	0	0.00	3

== Awards and honors ==
- Lou Brock, Hutch Award

=== League records ===
- Garry Templeton, National League record, league leader in triples for three consecutive seasons

=== League leaders ===
- Garry Templeton, National League leader, triples

== Farm system ==
Level	Team	League	Manager
AAA	Springfield Redbirds	American Association	Hal Lanier
AA	Arkansas Travelers	Texas League	Tommy Thompson
A	St. Petersburg Cardinals	Florida State League	Sonny Ruberto
A	Gastonia Cardinals	Western Carolinas League	Johnny Lewis
Rookie	Johnson City Cardinals	Appalachian League	Nick Leyva

LEAGUE CHAMPIONS: Arkansas
