= 1979 New York Mets season =

1979 New York Mets
- League: National League
- Division: East
- Ballpark: Shea Stadium
- City: New York
- Record: 63–99 (.389)
- Divisional place: 6th
- Owners: Charles Shipman Payson
- General manager: Joe McDonald
- Manager: Joe Torre
- Television: WOR-TV
- Radio: WMCA (Ralph Kiner, Bob Murphy, Steve Albert)

The 1979 New York Mets season was the 18th season for the Mets, who played home games at Shea Stadium. Led by manager Joe Torre, the team had a 63–99 record and finished in sixth place in the National League East, thirty-five games behind the first place Pittsburgh Pirates. This was also the first season that the players' names appeared on the back of the uniforms.

== Offseason ==
- October 2, 1978: Paul Siebert was traded by the Mets to the St. Louis Cardinals for Bob Coluccio.
- December 4, 1978: Bobby Brown was drafted by the Mets from the New York Yankees in the 1978 rule 5 draft.
- December 5, 1978: Tom Grieve and Kim Seaman were traded by the Mets to the St. Louis Cardinals for Pete Falcone.
- December 8, 1978: Jerry Koosman was traded by the Mets to the Minnesota Twins for a player to be named later and Greg Field (minors). The Minnesota Twins completed the trade by sending Jesse Orosco to the Mets on February 7, 1979.
- March 25, 1979: Bobby Brown was selected off waivers from the Mets by the Toronto Blue Jays.
- March 27, 1979: Nino Espinosa was traded by the Mets to the Philadelphia Phillies for Richie Hebner and José Moreno.

== Regular season ==
The 1979 season was worse than 1978. The Mets were in last place by mid-May, and finished the season in last place for the third straight year. Attendance was below 1 million for the first time in team history, hitting a record low of just 788,000.

=== Season standings ===
NL East
Team	W	L	Pct.	GB	Home	Road
Pittsburgh Pirates	98	64	.605	—	48‍–‍33	50‍–‍31
Montreal Expos	95	65	.594	2	56‍–‍25	39‍–‍40
St. Louis Cardinals	86	76	.531	12	42‍–‍39	44‍–‍37
Philadelphia Phillies	84	78	.519	14	43‍–‍38	41‍–‍40
Chicago Cubs	80	82	.494	18	45‍–‍36	35‍–‍46
New York Mets	63	99	.389	35	28‍–‍53	35‍–‍46

=== Record vs. opponents ===
1979 National League record Sources:
Team	ATL	CHC	CIN	HOU	LAD	MON	NYM	PHI	PIT	SD	SF	STL
Atlanta	—	4–8	6–12	7–11	12–6	1–9	4–8	7–5	4–8	6–12	11–7	4–8
Chicago	8–4	—	7–5	6–6	5–7	6–12	8–10	9–9	6–12	9–3	8–4	8–10
Cincinnati	12–6	5–7	—	8–10	11–7	6–6	8–4	8–4	8–4	10–7	6–12	8–4
Houston	11–7	6–6	10–8	—	10–8	7–5	9–3	5–7	4–8	14–4	7–11	6–6
Los Angeles	6–12	7–5	7–11	8–10	—	6–6	9–3	3–9	4–8	9–9	14–4	6–6
Montreal	9–1	12–6	6–6	5–7	6–6	—	15–3	11–7	7–11	7–5	7–5	10–8
New York	8–4	10–8	4–8	3–9	3–9	3–15	—	5–13	8–10	4–8	8–4	7–11
Philadelphia	5–7	9–9	4–8	7–5	9–3	7–11	13–5	—	8–10	9–3	6–6	7–11
Pittsburgh	8–4	12–6	4–8	8–4	8–4	11–7	10–8	10–8	—	7–5	9–3	11–7
San Diego	12–6	3–9	7–10	4–14	9–9	5–7	8–4	3–9	5–7	—	8–10	4–8
San Francisco	7–11	4–8	12–6	11–7	4–14	5–7	4–8	6–6	3–9	10–8	—	5–7
St. Louis	8–4	10–8	4–8	6–6	6–6	8–10	11–7	11–7	7–11	8–4	7–5	—

=== Opening Day starters ===
- Kelvin Chapman
- Doug Flynn
- Richie Hebner
- Steve Henderson
- Elliott Maddox
- Lee Mazzilli
- Willie Montañez
- John Stearns
- Craig Swan

=== Notable transactions ===
- June 5, 1979: 1979 Major League Baseball draft
  - Tim Leary was drafted by the Mets in the 1st round (2nd pick).
  - Ron Gardenhire was drafted by the Mets in the 6th round.
  - Dave Smith was drafted by the Mets in the 27th round.
  - Bill Mooneyham was drafted by the Mets in the 1st round (22nd pick) of the secondary phase, but did not sign.
- June 15, 1979: Bob Myrick and Mike Bruhert were traded by the Mets to the Texas Rangers for Dock Ellis.
- August 12, 1979: Willie Montañez was traded by the Mets to the Texas Rangers for two players to be named later. The Rangers sent Ed Lynch to the Mets on September 18 and Mike Jorgensen on October 23 to complete the deal.
- August 20, 1979: Ray Burris was selected off waivers by the Mets from the New York Yankees.
- September 21, 1979: Dock Ellis was purchased from the Mets by the Pittsburgh Pirates.

=== Roster ===
1979 New York Mets
Roster
Pitchers: 46 Neil Allen; 43 Juan Berenguer; 28 Dwight Bernard; 26 Ray Burris; 35 Dock Ellis; 33 Pete Falcone; 48 Ed Glynn; 44 Andy Hassler; 32 Tom Hausman; 31 Roy Lee Jackson; 49 Kevin Kobel; 38 Skip Lockwood; 22 Dale Murray; 61,47 Jesse Orosco; 20 John Pacella; 45 Jeff Reardon; 30 Mike Scott; 27 Craig Swan; 36 Wayne Twitchell; 40 Pat Zachry	Catchers: 42 Ron Hodges; 12 John Stearns; 6 Alex Treviño; Infielders: 10 Kelvin Chapman; 1 Sergio Ferrer; 23 Doug Flynn; 19 Tim Foli; 3 Richie Hebner; 7 Ed Kranepool; 25 Willie Montañez; 11 Frank Taveras	Outfielders: 4 Bruce Boisclair; 6 José Cardenal; 17 Gil Flores; 5 Steve Henderson; 21 Elliott Maddox; 16 Lee Mazzilli; 8 Dan Norman; 18 Joel Youngblood	Manager: 9 Joe Torre; Coaches: 53 Chuck Cottier; 24 Willie Mays; 52 Joe Pignatano; 51 Dick Sisler; 54 Rube Walker

== Player stats ==
=== Batting ===
==== Starters by position ====
Note: Pos = Position; G = Games played; AB = At bats; H = Hits; Avg. = Batting average; HR = Home runs; RBI = Runs batted in

Pos	Player	G	AB	H	Avg.	HR	RBI
C	John Stearns	155	538	131	.243	9	66
1B	Willie Montañez	109	410	96	.234	5	47
2B	Doug Flynn	157	555	135	.243	4	61
SS	Frank Taveras	153	635	167	.263	1	33
3B	Richie Hebner	136	473	127	.268	10	79
LF	Steve Henderson	98	350	107	.306	5	39
CF	Lee Mazzilli	158	597	181	.303	15	79
RF	Joel Youngblood	158	590	162	.275	16	60

==== Other batters ====
Note: G = Games played; AB = At bats; H = Hits; Avg. = Batting average; HR = Home runs; RBI = Runs batted in

Player	G	AB	H	Avg.	HR	RBI
Elliott Maddox	86	224	60	.268	1	12
Alex Treviño	79	207	56	.271	0	20
Ed Kranepool	82	155	36	.232	2	17
Dan Norman	44	110	27	.245	3	11
Bruce Boisclair	59	98	18	.184	0	4
Gil Flores	70	93	18	.194	1	10
Ron Hodges	59	86	14	.163	0	5
Kelvin Chapman	35	80	12	.150	0	4
José Cardenal	11	37	11	.297	2	4
Sergio Ferrer	32	9	0	.000	0	0
Tim Foli	3	7	0	.000	0	0

=== Pitching ===
==== Starting pitchers ====
Note: G = Games pitched; IP = Innings pitched; W = Wins; L = Losses; ERA = Earned run average; SO = Strikeouts

Player	G	IP	W	L	ERA	SO
Craig Swan	35	251.1	14	13	3.29	145
Pete Falcone	33	184.0	6	14	4.16	113
Kevin Kobel	30	161.2	6	8	3.51	67
Dock Ellis	17	85.0	3	7	6.04	41
Pat Zachry	7	42.2	5	1	3.59	17
Juan Berenguer	5	30.2	1	1	2.93	25
Ray Burris	4	21.2	0	2	3.32	10
John Pacella	4	16.1	0	2	4.41	12

==== Other pitchers ====
Note: G = Games pitched; IP = Innings pitched; W = Wins; L = Losses; ERA = Earned run average; SO = Strikeouts

Player	G	IP	W	L	ERA	SO
Andy Hassler	29	80.1	4	5	3.70	53
Tom Hausman	19	78.2	2	6	2.75	33
Mike Scott	18	52.1	1	3	5.33	21

==== Relief pitchers ====
Note: G = Games pitched; W = Wins; L = Losses; SV = Saves; ERA = Earned run average; SO = Strikeouts

Player	G	W	L	SV	ERA	SO
Neil Allen	50	6	10	8	3.55	65
Dale Murray	58	4	8	4	4.82	37
Ed Glynn	46	1	4	7	3.00	32
Wayne Twitchell	33	5	3	0	5.23	44
Dwight Bernard	32	0	3	0	4.70	20
Skip Lockwood	27	2	5	9	1.49	42
Jesse Orosco	18	1	2	0	4.89	22
Jeff Reardon	18	1	2	2	1.74	10
Roy Lee Jackson	8	1	0	0	2.20	10

== Farm system ==
Level	Team	League	Manager
AAA	Tidewater Tides	International League	Frank Verdi
AA	Jackson Mets	Texas League	Bob Wellman
A	Lynchburg Mets	Carolina League	Jack Aker
A-Short Season	Little Falls Mets	New York–Penn League	Matt Galante
A-Short Season	Grays Harbor Mets	Northwest League	Dan Monzon
