= 1979 Los Angeles Dodgers season =

1979 Los Angeles Dodgers
- League: National League
- Division: West
- Ballpark: Dodger Stadium
- City: Los Angeles
- Record: 79–83 (.488)
- Divisional place: 3rd
- Owner: Walter O'Malley
- President: Peter O'Malley
- General managers: Al Campanis
- Managers: Tommy Lasorda
- Television: KTTV (11)
- Radio: KABC; Vin Scully, Jerry Doggett, Ross Porter; KTNQ; Jaime Jarrín, Rudy Hoyos

The 1979 Los Angeles Dodgers season was the 90th season for the Los Angeles Dodgers franchise in Major League Baseball (MLB), their 22nd season in Los Angeles, California, and their 18th season playing their home games at Dodger Stadium in Los Angeles California. The team finished the season in third place in the National League West. Near the end of the season, owner Walter O'Malley died, and the ownership of the team went to his son, Peter.

== Offseason ==
- February 15, 1979: Brad Gulden was traded by the Dodgers to the New York Yankees for Gary Thomasson.

== Regular season ==
=== Season standings ===
NL West
| Team | W | L | Pct. | GB | Home | Road |
|---|---|---|---|---|---|---|
| Cincinnati Reds | 90 | 71 | .559 | — | 48‍–‍32 | 42‍–‍39 |
| Houston Astros | 89 | 73 | .549 | 1½ | 52‍–‍29 | 37‍–‍44 |
| Los Angeles Dodgers | 79 | 83 | .488 | 11½ | 46‍–‍35 | 33‍–‍48 |
| San Francisco Giants | 71 | 91 | .438 | 19½ | 38‍–‍43 | 33‍–‍48 |
| San Diego Padres | 68 | 93 | .422 | 22 | 39‍–‍42 | 29‍–‍51 |
| Atlanta Braves | 66 | 94 | .412 | 23½ | 34‍–‍45 | 32‍–‍49 |

=== Record vs. opponents ===
1979 National League record Sources:
| Team | ATL | CHC | CIN | HOU | LAD | MON | NYM | PHI | PIT | SD | SF | STL |
|---|---|---|---|---|---|---|---|---|---|---|---|---|
| Atlanta | — | 4–8 | 6–12 | 7–11 | 12–6 | 1–9 | 4–8 | 7–5 | 4–8 | 6–12 | 11–7 | 4–8 |
| Chicago | 8–4 | — | 7–5 | 6–6 | 5–7 | 6–12 | 8–10 | 9–9 | 6–12 | 9–3 | 8–4 | 8–10 |
| Cincinnati | 12–6 | 5–7 | — | 8–10 | 11–7 | 6–6 | 8–4 | 8–4 | 8–4 | 10–7 | 6–12 | 8–4 |
| Houston | 11–7 | 6–6 | 10–8 | — | 10–8 | 7–5 | 9–3 | 5–7 | 4–8 | 14–4 | 7–11 | 6–6 |
| Los Angeles | 6–12 | 7–5 | 7–11 | 8–10 | — | 6–6 | 9–3 | 3–9 | 4–8 | 9–9 | 14–4 | 6–6 |
| Montreal | 9–1 | 12–6 | 6–6 | 5–7 | 6–6 | — | 15–3 | 11–7 | 7–11 | 7–5 | 7–5 | 10–8 |
| New York | 8–4 | 10–8 | 4–8 | 3–9 | 3–9 | 3–15 | — | 5–13 | 8–10 | 4–8 | 8–4 | 7–11 |
| Philadelphia | 5–7 | 9–9 | 4–8 | 7–5 | 9–3 | 7–11 | 13–5 | — | 8–10 | 9–3 | 6–6 | 7–11 |
| Pittsburgh | 8–4 | 12–6 | 4–8 | 8–4 | 8–4 | 11–7 | 10–8 | 10–8 | — | 7–5 | 9–3 | 11–7 |
| San Diego | 12–6 | 3–9 | 7–10 | 4–14 | 9–9 | 5–7 | 8–4 | 3–9 | 5–7 | — | 8–10 | 4–8 |
| San Francisco | 7–11 | 4–8 | 12–6 | 11–7 | 4–14 | 5–7 | 4–8 | 6–6 | 3–9 | 10–8 | — | 5–7 |
| St. Louis | 8–4 | 10–8 | 4–8 | 6–6 | 6–6 | 8–10 | 11–7 | 11–7 | 7–11 | 8–4 | 7–5 | — |

=== Opening Day lineup ===
Opening Day starters
| Name | Position |
|---|---|
| Davey Lopes | Second baseman |
| Bill Russell | Shortstop |
| Reggie Smith | Right fielder |
| Steve Garvey | First baseman |
| Ron Cey | Third baseman |
| Dusty Baker | Left fielder |
| Rick Monday | Center fielder |
| Steve Yeager | Catcher |
| Burt Hooton | Starting pitcher |

=== Notable transactions ===
- April 7, 1979: Rick Rhoden was traded by the Dodgers to the Pittsburgh Pirates for Jerry Reuss.
- May 11, 1979: Lance Rautzhan was purchased from the Dodgers by the Milwaukee Brewers.
- May 11, 1979: Lerrin LaGrow was purchased by the Dodgers from the Chicago White Sox.

=== Roster ===
1979 Los Angeles Dodgers
Roster
| Pitchers: 27 Joe Beckwith; 34 Ken Brett; 37 Bobby Castillo; 51 Terry Forster; 29 Gerry Hannahs; 46 Burt Hooton; 49 Charlie Hough; 36 Lerrin LaGrow; 27,21 Dennis Lewallyn; 47 Andy Messersmith; 56 Dave Patterson; 31 Doug Rau; 38 Lance Rautzhan; 41 Jerry Reuss; 43 Rick Sutcliffe; 20 Don Sutton; 35 Bob Welch | Catchers: 13 Joe Ferguson; 5 Johnny Oates; 7 Steve Yeager; Infielders: 10 Ron Cey; 6 Steve Garvey; 15 Davey Lopes; 23 Ted Martínez; 18 Bill Russell | Outfielders: 12 Dusty Baker; 33 Vic Davalillo; 57 Pedro Guerrero; 44 Mickey Hatcher; 14 Von Joshua; 16 Rick Monday; 11 Manny Mota; 8 Reggie Smith; 1,3 Derrel Thomas; 9 Gary Thomasson | Manager: 2 Tommy Lasorda; Coaches: 26 Red Adams; 54 Monty Basgall; 58 Mark Cresse; 28 Preston Gómez; 45 Jim Lefebvre |

== Player stats ==
=== Batting ===
==== Starters by position ====
Note: Pos = Position; G = Games played; AB = At bats; H = Hits; Avg. = Batting average; HR = Home runs; RBI = Runs batted in

| Pos | Player | G | AB | H | Avg. | HR | RBI |
|---|---|---|---|---|---|---|---|
| C | Steve Yeager | 105 | 310 | 67 | .216 | 13 | 41 |
| 1B | Steve Garvey | 162 | 648 | 204 | .315 | 28 | 110 |
| 2B | Davey Lopes | 153 | 582 | 154 | .265 | 28 | 73 |
| SS | Bill Russell | 153 | 627 | 170 | .271 | 7 | 56 |
| 3B | Ron Cey | 150 | 487 | 137 | .281 | 28 | 81 |
| LF | Dusty Baker | 151 | 554 | 152 | .274 | 23 | 88 |
| CF | Derrel Thomas | 141 | 406 | 104 | .256 | 5 | 44 |
| RF | Reggie Smith | 68 | 234 | 64 | .274 | 10 | 32 |

==== Other batters ====
Note: G = Games played; AB = At bats; H = Hits; Avg. = Batting average; HR = Home runs; RBI = Runs batted in

| Player | G | AB | H | Avg. | HR | RBI |
|---|---|---|---|---|---|---|
| Joe Ferguson | 122 | 363 | 95 | .262 | 20 | 69 |
| Gary Thomasson | 115 | 315 | 78 | .248 | 14 | 45 |
| Von Joshua | 94 | 142 | 40 | .282 | 3 | 14 |
| Ted Martínez | 81 | 112 | 30 | .268 | 0 | 2 |
| Mickey Hatcher | 33 | 93 | 25 | .269 | 1 | 5 |
| Pedro Guerrero | 25 | 62 | 15 | .242 | 2 | 9 |
| Johnny Oates | 26 | 46 | 6 | .130 | 0 | 2 |
| Manny Mota | 47 | 42 | 15 | .357 | 0 | 3 |
| Rick Monday | 12 | 33 | 10 | .303 | 0 | 2 |
| Vic Davalillo | 29 | 27 | 7 | .259 | 0 | 2 |

=== Pitching ===
==== Starting pitchers ====
Note: G = Games pitched; IP = Innings pitched; W = Wins; L = Losses; ERA = Earned run average; SO = Strikeouts

| Player | G | IP | W | L | ERA | SO |
|---|---|---|---|---|---|---|
| Rick Sutcliffe | 39 | 242.0 | 17 | 10 | 3.46 | 117 |
| Don Sutton | 33 | 226.0 | 12 | 15 | 3.82 | 146 |
| Burt Hooton | 29 | 212.0 | 11 | 10 | 2.97 | 129 |
| Andy Messersmith | 11 | 62.1 | 2 | 4 | 4.91 | 26 |
| Doug Rau | 11 | 56.0 | 1 | 5 | 5.30 | 28 |

==== Other pitchers ====
Note: G = Games pitched; IP = Innings pitched; W = Wins; L = Losses; ERA = Earned run average; SO = Strikeouts

| Player | G | IP | W | L | ERA | SO |
|---|---|---|---|---|---|---|
| Jerry Reuss | 39 | 160.0 | 7 | 14 | 3.54 | 83 |
| Charlie Hough | 42 | 151.1 | 7 | 5 | 4.76 | 76 |
| Bob Welch | 25 | 81.1 | 5 | 6 | 3.98 | 64 |
| Gerry Hannahs | 4 | 16.0 | 0 | 2 | 3.38 | 6 |

==== Relief pitchers ====
Note: G = Games pitched; W = Wins; L = Losses; SV = Saves; ERA = Earned run average; SO = Strikeouts

| Player | G | W | L | SV | ERA | SO |
|---|---|---|---|---|---|---|
| Dave Patterson | 36 | 4 | 1 | 6 | 5.26 | 34 |
| Lerrin LaGrow | 31 | 5 | 1 | 4 | 3.41 | 22 |
| Ken Brett | 30 | 4 | 3 | 2 | 3.45 | 13 |
| Bobby Castillo | 19 | 2 | 0 | 7 | 1.11 | 25 |
| Joe Beckwith | 17 | 1 | 2 | 2 | 4.34 | 28 |
| Terry Forster | 17 | 1 | 2 | 2 | 5.51 | 8 |
| Lance Rautzhan | 12 | 0 | 2 | 1 | 7.45 | 5 |
| Dennis Lewallyn | 7 | 0 | 1 | 0 | 5.11 | 1 |

== Awards and honors ==
- National League Rookie of the Year
  - Rick Sutcliffe
- TSN Rookie Pitcher of the Year Award
  - Rick Sutcliffe
- NL Player of the Week
  - Dusty Baker (May 22–28)
  - Manny Mota (Aug. 27 – Sep. 3)

=== All-Stars ===
- 1979 Major League Baseball All-Star Game
  - Steve Garvey, starter, first base
  - Davey Lopes, starter, second base
  - Ron Cey, reserve
- TSN National League All-Star
  - Davey Lopes
- Baseball Digest Rookie All-Star
  - Rick Sutcliffe

== Farm system ==
| Level | Team | League | Manager |
|---|---|---|---|
| AAA | Albuquerque Dukes | Pacific Coast League | Del Crandall |
| AA | San Antonio Dodgers | Texas League | Don LeJohn |
| A | Lodi Dodgers | California League | Stan Wasiak |
| A | Clinton Dodgers | Midwest League | Dick McLaughlin |
| **Rookie** | **Lethbridge Dodgers** | **Pioneer League** | **Gail Henley** |

Teams in BOLD won League Championships

== Major League Baseball draft ==
The Dodgers drafted 36 players in the June draft and 11 in the January draft. Of those, five players would eventually play in the Major Leagues.

The Dodgers lost their first round pick in the June draft to the San Diego Padres because they signed free agent Derrel Thomas but they gained the first round picks of the Pittsburgh Pirates (compensation for Lee Lacy) and New York Yankees (for Tommy John). With those picks they drafted two players from the University of Michigan, left-handed pitcher Steve Howe and right-handed pitcher Steve Perry. Howe was the 1980 NL Rookie of the Year, a 1981 World Series Champion and a 1982 All-Star. He played in 12 seasons and saved 91 games before a drug addiction forced him out of the game. Perry pitched six seasons in the minors, the last two with the AAA Albuquerque Dukes, and finished 28-40 with a 5.34 ERA before the Dodgers released him.

This year's draft class also included pitcher Orel Hershiser from Bowling Green University, who was picked in the 17th round. He pitched 18 seasons (13 with the Dodgers), winning 204 games. He set a Major League record with a 59 consecutive scoreless inning streak in 1988 en route to winning the Cy Young Award and the World Series MVP. He was also a three-time All-Star.

1979 draft picks

=== January draft ===
| Round | Name | Position | School | Signed | Career span | Highest level |
|---|---|---|---|---|---|---|
| 1 | Robert Silicani | 3B | College of San Mateo | Yes | 1979 | Rookie |
| 2 | Jim Teller | OF | Sacramento City College | No; Red Sox-1979 | 1979–1982 | A |
| 3 | Kyle Dunning | RHP | Linn-Benton Community College | No | | |
| 4 | Joseph Siers | RHP | Palm Beach Community College | No | | |
| 5 | Phillip Smith | SS | Georgia Perimeter College | No | | |
| 6 | Eric Stack | RHP | Lane Community College | No | | |
| 7 | James Gleissner | C | Mount San Antonio College | No; Royals-1980 | 1980–1984 | AA |

==== January secondary phase ====
| Round | Name | Position | School | Signed | Career span | Highest level |
|---|---|---|---|---|---|---|
| 1 | Rick Misuraca | 3B | Rose State College | Yes | 1979 | Rookie |
| 2 | John Millholland | SS | Louisburg College | No; Yankees-1980 | 1980–1981 | A |
| 3 | Richard Ross | OF | San Jose City College | No | | |
| 4 | Tommy Blackmon | RHP | Spartanburg Methodist College | No; Indians-1980 | 19980-1984 | AA |

=== June draft ===
| Round | Name | Position | School | Signed | Career span | Highest level |
|---|---|---|---|---|---|---|
| 1 | Steve Howe | LHP | University of Michigan | Yes | 1979–1997 | **MLB** |
| 1 | Steve Perry | RHP | University of Michigan | Yes | 1979–1984 | AAA |
| 2 | David Lanning | 3B | University of Georgia | Yes | 1979–1981 | AA |
| 3 | Don Crow | C | Washington State University | Yes | 1979–1982 | **MLB** |
| 4 | Leo Mann | SS | University of Missouri | Yes | 1979–1981 | A |
| 5 | Terry Sutcliffe | RHP | University of Kansas | Yes | 1979–1981 | A |
| 6 | Dale Holman | OF | Louisiana Tech University | Yes | 1979–1987 | AAA |
| 7 | Timothy Gloyd | SS | Pepperdine University | Yes | 1979–1981 | A |
| 8 | Jeff Dietrich | LHP | Serramonte High School | No | | |
| 9 | Felix Oroz | LHP | University of Wyoming | Yes | 1979–1984 | AAA |
| 10 | John Houston | C | John F. Kennedy High School | Yes | 1979–1980 | Rookie |
| 11 | Mark Sheehy | 2B | University of California, Riverside | Yes | 1979–1987 | AAA |
| 12 | Kerwin Danley | OF | Susan Miller Dorsey High School | No | | |
| 13 | Greg Brock | 1B | University of Wyoming | Yes | 1979–1991 | **MLB** |
| 14 | Franklin Bryant | RHP | North Carolina State University | Yes | 1979–1982 | A |
| 15 | Tom Beyers | OF | California Polytechnic State University, San Luis Obispo | Yes | 1979–1983 | AAA |
| 16 | Kenneth Bullock | LHP | University of San Francisco | Yes | 1980 | A |
| 17 | Orel Hershiser | RHP | Bowling Green State University | Yes | 1979–2000 | **MLB** |
| 18 | Stanley Mohler | OF | University of South Alabama | Yes | 1979–1980 | A |
| 19 | Wayne Kellam | RHP | Indian River High School | Yes | 1979 | Rookie |
| 20 | William Sobbe | C | Northwest Missouri State University | Yes | 1979–1981 | AA |
| 21 | Clint Wickenscheimer | RHP | Ball State University | Yes | 1979-1982 | AA |
| 22 | Glenn Terry | LHP | Kimball High School | Yes | 1979–1982 | A |
| 23 | David Daniel | RHP | Antelope Valley High School | Yes | 1979–1982 | A |
| 24 | Morris Madden | LHP | Spartanburg Methodist College | Yes | 1979–1990 | **MLB** |
| 25 | Leonard Collins | SS | Hiram Johnson High School | No | | |
| 26 | Brian Dillard | OF | Bloom High School | No | | |
| 27 | Harry Kazanjian | C | Washington High School | No | | |
| 28 | Kevin Roddy | IF | Bellevue West High School | No | | |
| 29 | P. J. Schranz | SS | Bloom High School | No | | |
| 30 | Ted Salcido | SS | Wilson High School | Yes | 1980 | A |
| 31 | James Garcia | RHP | Bell High School | No | | |
| 32 | George Page | OF | Kennedy High School | No; Orioles-1982 | 1982–1983 | Rookie |

==== June secondary phase ====
| Round | Name | Position | School | Signed | Career span | Highest level |
|---|---|---|---|---|---|---|
| 1 | Alfredo Mejía | C | Oral Roberts University | Yes | 1979–1981 | AAA |
| 2 | Thomas McLaughlin | RHP | University of Nebraska–Lincoln | No; Giants-1980 | 1980–1981 | A |
| 3 | Kyle Dunning | RHP | Linn–Benton Community College | No | | |
| 4 | Bill Worden | C | Mission Hills JC | No; Angels-1981 | 1981–1986 | AA |
