= Joe Strain =

American baseball player (born 1954)

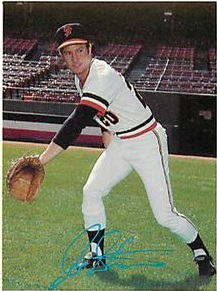
- Second baseman/Shortstop
- Born: April 30, 1954 (age 71); Denver, Colorado
- Batted: Right Threw: Right

MLB debut
- June 28, 1979, for the San Francisco Giants

Last MLB appearance
- June 2, 1981, for the Chicago Cubs

MLB statistics
- Batting average: .250
- Home runs: 1
- Runs batted in: 29
- Stats at Baseball Reference

Teams
- San Francisco Giants (1979–1980); Chicago Cubs (1981)
Medals
Men's baseball
Representing United States
Pan American Games
Silver medal – second place	1975 Mexico City	Team

Joseph Allan Strain (born April 30, 1954) is an American former professional baseball infielder. He played in Major League Baseball (MLB) from 1979 to 1981 for the San Francisco Giants and Chicago Cubs.

Strain currently resides in the home rule municipality of Centennial, Colorado.
