= George Throop (baseball) =

American baseball player (born 1950)

- Pitcher
- Born: November 24, 1950 (age 75); Pasadena, California, U.S.
- Batted: Right Threw: Right

MLB debut
- September 7, 1975, for the Kansas City Royals

Last MLB appearance
- August 21, 1979, for the Houston Astros

MLB statistics
- Win–loss record: 2–0
- Earned run average: 3.83
- Strikeouts: 27
- Stats at Baseball Reference

Teams
- Kansas City Royals (1975, 1977–1979); Houston Astros (1979)

George Lynford Throop (born November 24, 1950) is an American former professional baseball player. A right-handed pitcher, Throop appeared in 30 games — all in relief — over parts of four Major League seasons between 1975 and 1979. He was listed at 6 feet 7 inches (2.01 m) tall and weighed 205 pounds (93 kg).

Throop was drafted by the Kansas City Royals in the 16th round of the 1972 Major League Baseball draft after attending Pasadena City College and California State University, Long Beach. He spent nearly his entire career with the Royals organization. However, about half of his career appearances in the Major Leagues, and more than half of his 421/3 MLB innings pitched, came after a trade to the Houston Astros in April 1979.

He allowed 41 hits and 25 bases on balls, and notched three saves to accompany his three wins as a big-leaguer.

== Sources ==
- Career statistics from Baseball Reference · Baseball Reference (Minors) · Retrosheet · Baseball Almanac
