= Jim Wessinger =

American baseball player (born 1955)

- Second baseman
- Born: September 25, 1955 (age 70); Utica, New York, U.S.
- Batted: Right Threw: Right

MLB debut
- August 4, 1979, for the Atlanta Braves

Last MLB appearance
- September 24, 1979, for the Atlanta Braves

MLB statistics
- Batting average: .000
- Home runs: 0
- Runs batted in: 0
- Stats at Baseball Reference

Teams
- Atlanta Braves (1979)

James Michael Wessinger (born September 25, 1955) is an American former second baseman, pinch hitter and pinch runner for the Atlanta Braves in 1979.

The right-handed Wessinger attended Notre Dame High School in Utica and then Le Moyne College prior to being drafted by the Braves in the sixth round of the 1976 amateur draft.

He made his major league debut on August 9, 1979, at the age of 23. He appeared in both games of a doubleheader that day, pinch running for Pepe Frias in the first game and starting the second game before being replaced by Jerry Royster. He spent a total of 10 games in the big leagues that year, hitting .000 in seven at-bats, though he did score two runs. He appeared in his final game on September 24, 1979, a day shy of his 24th birthday.

Though his major league career was relatively short, his minor league career lasted five seasons. In 524 minor league games, Wessinger hit .266 with 14 home runs. In just 98 games in 1979, he hit .297 with five home runs and 53 runs scored.
