= Mike Mendoza (baseball) =

American baseball player (born 1955)

- Pitcher/Pinch runner
- Born: November 26, 1955 (age 70); Inglewood, California
- Batted: Right Threw: Right

MLB debut
- September 7, 1979, for the Houston Astros

Last MLB appearance
- September 26, 1979, for the Houston Astros

MLB statistics
- Games played: 2
- Innings pitched: 1.0
- Earned run average: 0.00
- Stats at Baseball Reference

Teams
- Houston Astros (1979)

Michael Joseph Mendoza (born November 26, 1955) is a former professional baseball player. Mendoza played in two games for the Houston Astros in 1979.

== Baseball career ==
Mike attended McClintock High School in Tempe, AZ. He was selected in the 5th round (116th overall) by the Houston Astros in the 1973 Amateur Baseball Draft.

In his major league debut on September 7, 1979, Mendoza pinch ran for Art Howe in bottom of the 8th inning. On September 26 against the Atlanta Braves at Fulton County Stadium, Mendoza pitched in his only game in the 8th inning for the Astros, facing three batters Bob Horner, Dale Murphy, and Barry Bonnell, and not allowing any baserunners.

Mendoza pitched in the Minor leagues from 1973 to 1981 in the Astros, New York Mets, and Chicago Cubs minor league systems.
