= 1979 Major League Baseball All-Star Game =

1979 American baseball competition

	1	2	3	4	5	6	7	8	9	R	H	E
National League	2	1	1	0	0	1	0	1	1	7	10	1
American League	3	0	2	0	0	1	0	0	0	6	10	0
- Date: July 17, 1979
- Venue: Kingdome
- City: Seattle, Washington
- Managers: Tommy Lasorda (LA); Bob Lemon (NYY)
- MVP: Dave Parker (PIT)
- Attendance: 58,905
- Ceremonial first pitch: Danny Kaye
- Television: NBC
- TV announcers: Joe Garagiola, Tony Kubek, and Tom Seaver
- Radio: CBS
- Radio announcers: Vin Scully, Brent Musburger, and Jerry Coleman

The 1979 Major League Baseball All-Star Game was the 50th playing of the midsummer classic between the all-stars of the American League (AL) and National League (NL), the two leagues constituting Major League Baseball.

It was held on Tuesday, July 17, at the Kingdome in Seattle, Washington, the home of the third-year Seattle Mariners of the American League. The National League won 7–6 for their eighth consecutive win.

The game featured memorable defensive play by starting right fielder Dave Parker, as he had two assists on putouts: one at third base in the seventh inning and another at home plate to end the eighth. With Parker receiving the MVP award for this game, and teammate Willie Stargell winning the National League MVP, NLCS MVP, and World Series MVP, all four possible MVP awards for the season were won by members of the Pittsburgh Pirates. The game was also notable for the play of Lee Mazzilli, providing the margin of victory. In his only All-Star appearance, Mazzilli tied the game in the eighth inning with a pinch hit home run off of Jim Kern of the Texas Rangers, and then put the National League ahead for good in the ninth, drawing a bases-loaded walk against Ron Guidry of the New York Yankees.

This was the only All-Star Game at the Kingdome. When it returned to Seattle in 2001, the Mariners had moved across the street to their new home at Safeco Field.

It was the second All-Star Game held indoors, the first was eleven years earlier at the Astrodome in Houston. The weather outdoors was unseasonably hot in Seattle, with a high temperature of 96 °F (36 °C).

== Rosters ==
Players in italics have since been inducted into the National Baseball Hall of Fame.

=== National League ===
Starters
Position	Player	Team	All-Star Games
P	Steve Carlton	Phillies	7
C	Bob Boone	Phillies	3
1B	Steve Garvey	Dodgers	6
2B	Davey Lopes	Dodgers	2
3B	Mike Schmidt	Phillies	4
SS	Larry Bowa	Phillies	5
OF	George Foster	Reds	4
OF	Dave Parker	Pirates	2
OF	Dave Winfield	Padres	3

Pitchers
Position	Player	Team	All-Star Games
P	Joaquín Andújar	Astros	2
P	Mike LaCoss	Reds	1
P	Joe Niekro	Astros	1
P	Gaylord Perry	Padres	5
P	Steve Rogers	Expos	3
P	Joe Sambito	Astros	1
P	Bruce Sutter	Cubs	3

Reserves
Position	Player	Team	All-Star Games
C	Johnny Bench	Reds	12
C	Gary Carter	Expos	2
C	Ted Simmons	Cardinals	6
C	John Stearns	Mets	2
1B	Keith Hernandez	Cardinals	1
1B	Pete Rose	Phillies	13
2B	Joe Morgan	Reds	10
3B	Ron Cey	Dodgers	6
3B	Larry Parrish	Expos	1
SS	Dave Concepción	Reds	6
SS	Craig Reynolds	Astros	2
SS	Garry Templeton	Cardinals	2
OF	Lou Brock	Cardinals	6
OF	Jack Clark	Giants	2
OF	Dave Kingman	Cubs	2
OF	Gary Matthews	Braves	1
OF	Lee Mazzilli	Mets	1

=== American League ===
Starters
Position	Player	Team	All-Star Games
P	Nolan Ryan	Angels	5
C	Darrell Porter	Royals	3
1B	Carl Yastrzemski	Red Sox	16
2B	Frank White	Royals	2
3B	George Brett	Royals	4
SS	Roy Smalley	Twins	1
OF	Don Baylor	Angels	1
OF	Fred Lynn	Red Sox	5
OF	Jim Rice	Red Sox	3

Pitchers
Position	Player	Team	All-Star Games
P	Mark Clear	Angels	1
P	Ron Guidry	Yankees	2
P	Tommy John	Yankees	3
P	Jim Kern	Rangers	3
P	Dave Lemanczyk	Blue Jays	1
P	Sid Monge	Indians	1
P	Don Stanhouse	Orioles	1
P	Bob Stanley	Red Sox	1

Reserves
Position	Player	Team	All-Star Games
C	Brian Downing	Angels	1
C	Jeff Newman	A's	1
1B	Bruce Bochte	Mariners	1
1B	Rod Carew	Angels	13
1B	Cecil Cooper	Brewers	1
2B	Bobby Grich	Angels	4
3B	Graig Nettles	Yankees	4
SS	Rick Burleson	Red Sox	3
OF	Reggie Jackson	Yankees	9
OF	Steve Kemp	Tigers	1
OF	Chet Lemon	White Sox	2
OF	Ken Singleton	Orioles	2

== Game ==
=== Umpires ===
Home plate	George Maloney (AL)
First base	Lee Weyer (NL)
Second base	Nick Bremigan (AL)
Third base	Bill Williams (NL)
Left Field	Terry Cooney (AL)
Right Field	Dutch Rennert (NL)

=== Starting lineups ===
National League				American League			
Order	Player	Team	Position	Order	Player	Team	Position
1	Davey Lopes	Dodgers	2B	1	Roy Smalley	Twins	SS
2	Dave Parker	Pirates	RF	2	George Brett	Royals	3B
3	Steve Garvey	Dodgers	1B	3	Don Baylor	Angels	LF
4	Mike Schmidt	Phillies	3B	4	Jim Rice	Red Sox	RF
5	George Foster	Reds	LF	5	Fred Lynn	Red Sox	CF
6	Dave Winfield	Padres	CF	6	Carl Yastrzemski	Red Sox	1B
7	Bob Boone	Phillies	C	7	Darrell Porter	Royals	C
8	Larry Bowa	Phillies	SS	8	Frank White	Royals	2B
9	Steve Carlton	Phillies	P	9	Nolan Ryan	Angels	P

=== Game summary ===
Tuesday, July 17, 1979 5:40 pm PDT at Kingdome in Seattle, Washington
Team	1	2	3	4	5	6	7	8	9	R	H	E
National League	2	1	1	0	0	1	0	1	1	7	10	1
American League	3	0	2	0	0	1	0	0	0	6	10	0
WP: Bruce Sutter (1-0) LP: Jim Kern (0-1); Home runs: NL: Lee Mazzilli (1); AL: Fred Lynn (1); Attendance: 58,905

American League starter Nolan Ryan began the game in sizzling fashion, striking out Davey Lopes and Dave Parker, but walked Steve Garvey. Mike Schmidt tripled in Garvey, and George Foster followed with a double down the right field line to score Schmidt for a 2–0 National League lead.

The American Leaguers came right back in the bottom of the first. George Brett walked with one out, Don Baylor doubled him in, and Fred Lynn put the AL up 3–2 with a two-out, two-run homer off Steve Carlton.

The NL regained the lead on a bases-loaded sacrifice fly by Parker in the second and an RBI groundout by Dave Winfield in the third. The AL went back up 5–4 in the bottom of the third when Carl Yastrzemski batted in a run with a single and Chet Lemon scored on a Schmidt error.

The score remained that way until the top of the sixth, when the NL tied it at five on a Winfield double off Mark Clear and an RBI single by Gary Carter. Pete Rose pinch-hit in and bounced into a double play, then entered the game, replacing Garvey at first and becoming the first player to appear in the All-Star Game at five different positions.

The AL went back up 6–5 in the bottom of the sixth. Gaylord Perry gave up a leadoff single to Yastrzemski, a double to Darrell Porter, and an RBI single to Mariner Bruce Bochte before leaving in favor of Joe Sambito without retiring a batter. Sambito pitched the NL out of trouble by getting Reggie Jackson to ground to Lopes at second, who gunned down Porter at the plate. After an intentional walk to Roy Smalley to load the bases, Sambito retired Brett and was relieved by Mike LaCoss. LaCoss then induced Baylor to hit into a force play end the inning.

In the bottom of the seventh, Jim Rice led off and blooped a double to right with a high bounce off the artificial turf, but was thrown out by Parker as he tried to stretch it into a triple. Batting for Gary Matthews, Lee Mazzilli tied the score at six in the top of the eighth with an opposite-field homer off Jim Kern, the first pinch-hit home run in MLB All-Star game history.

The AL mounted one last threat in the bottom of the eighth when Brian Downing led off with a crisp single off Bruce Sutter and was sacrificed to second by Bochte. Sutter walked Jackson intentionally and then struck out Bobby Grich for the second out. Graig Nettles then lined a single to right, and Downing attempted to score, but once again the arm of Parker claimed another victim. Fielding the line drive on the first bounce, he fired a perfect strike on the fly to Carter, who blocked Downing's right hand from reaching the plate. Along with his other assist an inning earlier, this play earned Parker the game's MVP award.

The NL took the lead in the top of the ninth without recording a base hit. Joe Morgan walked with one out and was balked to second. Kern walked Parker intentionally, retired Craig Reynolds on a foul pop, but then walked Ron Cey to load the bases. Ron Guidry came in and walked Mazzilli, forcing in Morgan with the winning run. In the bottom of the inning, Sutter retired the side, with strikeouts of Rice and Rick Burleson to end the game and earn the win.
