= 1979 in baseball =

The following are the baseball events of the year 1979 throughout the world.

== Champions ==
=== Major League Baseball ===
- World Series: Pittsburgh Pirates over Baltimore Orioles (4–3); Willie Stargell, MVP

League Championship Series (ALCS, NLCS)
East	Baltimore	3
West	California	1
East	Pittsburgh	3
West	Cincinnati	0

World Series
AL	Baltimore	3
NL	Pittsburgh	4

- American League Championship Series MVP: None.
- National League Championship Series MVP: Willie Stargell
- All-Star Game, July 17 at the Kingdome: National League, 7–6; Dave Parker, MVP

=== Other champions ===
- College World Series: Cal State-Fullerton
- Cuban National Series: Sancti Spíritus
- Japan Series: Hiroshima Toyo Carp over Kintetsu Buffaloes (4–3)
- Big League World Series: West Hempstead, New York
- Little League World Series: Pu-Tzu Town, Hsien, Taiwan
- Senior League World Series: Tung–Feng LL Taichung, Taiwan
- Pan American Games: Cuba over Dominican Republic

Winter Leagues

- 1979 Caribbean Series: Navegantes del Magallanes
- Dominican Republic League: Águilas Cibaeñas
- Mexican Pacific League: Mayos de Navojoa
- Puerto Rican League: Criollos de Caguas
- Venezuelan League: Navegantes del Magallanes

== Awards and honors ==
- Baseball Hall of Fame
  - Willie Mays
  - Hack Wilson
  - Warren Giles (executive)

Baseball Writers' Association of America Awards
BBWAA Award	National League	American League
Rookie of the Year	Rick Sutcliffe (LAD)	John Castino (MIN); Alfredo Griffin (TOR)
Cy Young Award	Bruce Sutter (CHC)	Mike Flanagan (BAL)
Most Valuable Player	Keith Hernandez (STL); Willie Stargell (PIT)	Don Baylor (CAL)
Babe Ruth Award (World Series MVP)	Willie Stargell (PIT)	—
Gold Glove Awards
Position	National League	American League
Pitcher	Phil Niekro (ATL)	Jim Palmer (BAL)
Catcher	Bob Boone (PHI)	Jim Sundberg (TEX)
1st Base	Keith Hernandez (STL)	Cecil Cooper (MIL)
2nd Base	Manny Trillo (PHI)	Frank White (KC)
3rd Base	Mike Schmidt (PHI)	Buddy Bell (TEX)
Shortstop	Dave Concepción (CIN)	Rick Burleson (BOS)
Outfield	Garry Maddox (PHI)	Dwight Evans (BOS)
Outfield	Dave Parker (PIT)	Sixto Lezcano (MIL)
Outfield	Dave Winfield (SD)	Fred Lynn (BOS)

- Woman Executive of the Year (major or minor league)
  - Doris Krucker, Midwest League

== Statistical leaders ==
	American League		National League	
Stat	Player	Total	Player	Total
AVG	Fred Lynn (BOS)	.333	Keith Hernandez (STL)	.344
HR	Gorman Thomas (MIL)	45	Dave Kingman (CHC)	48
RBI	Don Baylor (CAL)	139	Dave Winfield (SD)	118
W	Mike Flanagan (BAL)	23	Joe Niekro (HOU); Phil Niekro (ATL)	21
ERA	Ron Guidry (NYY)	2.78	J. R. Richard (HOU)	2.71
K	Nolan Ryan (CAL)	223	J. R. Richard (HOU)	313

== Major league baseball final standings ==
=== American League final standings ===
AL East
Team	W	L	Pct.	GB	Home	Road
^{(1)} Baltimore Orioles	102	57	.642	—	55‍–‍24	47‍–‍33
Milwaukee Brewers	95	66	.590	8	52‍–‍29	43‍–‍37
Boston Red Sox	91	69	.569	11½	51‍–‍29	40‍–‍40
New York Yankees	89	71	.556	13½	51‍–‍30	38‍–‍41
Detroit Tigers	85	76	.528	18	46‍–‍34	39‍–‍42
Cleveland Indians	81	80	.503	22	47‍–‍34	34‍–‍46
Toronto Blue Jays	53	109	.327	50½	32‍–‍49	21‍–‍60

AL West
Team	W	L	Pct.	GB	Home	Road
^{(2)} California Angels	88	74	.543	—	49‍–‍32	39‍–‍42
Kansas City Royals	85	77	.525	3	46‍–‍35	39‍–‍42
Texas Rangers	83	79	.512	5	44‍–‍37	39‍–‍42
Minnesota Twins	82	80	.506	6	39‍–‍42	43‍–‍38
Chicago White Sox	73	87	.456	14	33‍–‍46	40‍–‍41
Seattle Mariners	67	95	.414	21	36‍–‍45	31‍–‍50
Oakland Athletics	54	108	.333	34	31‍–‍50	23‍–‍58

Locations of teams for the 1977–1981 American League seasons
West East

=== National League final standings ===
NL East
Team	W	L	Pct.	GB	Home	Road
^{(1)} Pittsburgh Pirates	98	64	.605	—	48‍–‍33	50‍–‍31
Montreal Expos	95	65	.594	2	56‍–‍25	39‍–‍40
St. Louis Cardinals	86	76	.531	12	42‍–‍39	44‍–‍37
Philadelphia Phillies	84	78	.519	14	43‍–‍38	41‍–‍40
Chicago Cubs	80	82	.494	18	45‍–‍36	35‍–‍46
New York Mets	63	99	.389	35	28‍–‍53	35‍–‍46

NL West
Team	W	L	Pct.	GB	Home	Road
^{(2)} Cincinnati Reds	90	71	.559	—	48‍–‍32	42‍–‍39
Houston Astros	89	73	.549	1½	52‍–‍29	37‍–‍44
Los Angeles Dodgers	79	83	.488	11½	46‍–‍35	33‍–‍48
San Francisco Giants	71	91	.438	19½	38‍–‍43	33‍–‍48
San Diego Padres	68	93	.422	22	39‍–‍42	29‍–‍51
Atlanta Braves	66	94	.412	23½	34‍–‍45	32‍–‍49

Locations of teams for the 1977–1992 National League seasons
West East

== Nippon Professional Baseball final standings ==
=== Central League final standings ===
Central League
Team	G	W	L	T	Pct.	GB
Hiroshima Toyo Carp	130	67	50	13	.573	--
Yokohama Taiyo Whales	130	59	54	17	.522	6.0
Chunichi Dragons	130	59	57	14	.509	7.5
Hanshin Tigers	130	61	60	9	.504	8.0
Yomiuri Giants	130	58	62	10	.483	10.5
Yakult Swallows	130	48	69	13	.410	19.0

=== Pacific League final standings ===
Pacific League
Team	G	W	L	T	Pct.	1st half ranking	2nd half ranking
Kintetsu Buffaloes	130	74	45	11	.622	1	2
Hankyu Braves	130	75	44	11	.630	2	1
Nippon-Ham Fighters	130	63	60	7	.512	3	4
Lotte Orions	130	55	63	12	.466	4	3
Nankai Hawks	130	46	73	11	.387	5	6
Seibu Lions	130	45	73	12	.381	6	5

== Events ==
=== January ===
- January 6 – The Minnesota Twins re-sign veteran relief ace Mike Marshall, who had been granted free agency on November 2, 1978. In the coming season, his second as a Twin, Marshall will lead the American League in games pitched (90) and saves (32).
- January 8 – Dan O'Brien, general manager of the Texas Rangers since September 2, 1973, resigns his post and is succeeded by Eddie Robinson, former GM of the Atlanta Braves from 1972 to 1976. Nine days later, O'Brien, 49, is appointed president and CEO of the Seattle Mariners, the Rangers' rivals in the AL West.
- January 15 – The Seattle Mariners re-sign outfielder Tom Paciorek, 32, who had been granted free agency after playing 103 games for Seattle in 1978. Paciorek will make the 1981 AL All-Star team in a Mariner uniform.
- January 19:
  - The Pittsburgh Pirates sign veteran free-agent infielder Lee Lacy, formerly of the Los Angeles Dodgers.
  - The Montreal Expos sign 18 year old Andrés Galarraga as an international amateur free agent.
- January 23:
  - Willie Mays receives 409 of 432 votes in the Baseball Writers' Association of America election to earn enshrinement in the Hall of Fame.
  - The Toronto Blue Jays sell the contract of designated hitter Sam Ewing to the Nippon Ham Fighters of the Japanese Pacific League.
- January 27 – The Seattle Mariners sign veteran free-agent slugger Willie Horton, granted free agency from the Toronto Blue Jays on December 2, 1978. Horton, 36, will play in all 162 Mariners' games in 1979 as their designated hitter, blast 29 homers, and collect 106 runs batted in.

=== February ===
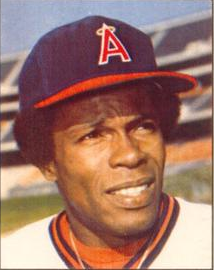
Rod Carew in 1979

- February 3:
  - The Minnesota Twins are forced to trade first baseman Rod Carew to the California Angels for four young players: Ken Landreaux, Dave Engle, Paul Hartzell and Brad Havens. In his first season with the Angels, he helps his new team reach the post season for the first time, batting over .300 for the next five seasons, and is selected for the next six American League All-Star teams.
  - The Oakland Athletics sell the contract of catching prospect Bruce Robinson to the New York Yankees for a reported $400,000—the highest cash amount Oakland owner Charlie Finley can demand, as dictated by Commissioner of Baseball Bowie Kuhn.
- February 12 – The Oakland Athletics fill their managerial vacancy by hiring Jim Marshall, previously skipper of the Chicago Cubs between July 25, 1974 and the end of 1976. Ex-first baseman Marshall, 47, replaces Jack McKeon, who parted company with the Athletics and owner Charlie Finley after the 1978 season ended.
- February 15 – The Los Angeles Dodgers trade catcher Brad Gulden to the New York Yankees for outfielder Gary Thomasson. Gulden will later this season start the August 6 game against the Baltimore Orioles, the Yankees' first game after the funeral for Thurman Munson, who had died days earlier in a plane crash.
- February 23 – The Chicago Cubs and Philadelphia Phillies, NL East division rivals, pull off an eight-player trade. Chicago sends catcher Dave Rader, second baseman Manny Trillo and outfielder Greg Gross to Philadelphia for pitchers Derek Botelho and Henry Mack, catcher Barry Foote, second baseman Ted Sizemore and outfielder Jerry Martin. In Trillo's four years as a Phillie, he will win three Gold Gloves and make three NL All-Star teams.

=== March ===
- March 7:
  - Amateur umpires officiate on the field as Cactus League and Grapefruit League exhibition contests begin. The Major League Umpires Association has called for a strike designed to improve working conditions, pay and benefits for arbiters of both the National and American leagues.
  - The Special Veterans Committee selects Warren Giles, late National League executive who died February 7, and Hack Wilson, the all-time holder of the record for most runs batted in a single season (191 in 1930), for induction in the Baseball Hall of Fame.
- March 10 – The St. Louis Cardinals sign veteran outfielder and pinch hitter Bernie Carbo, granted free agency from the Cleveland Indians on November 2, 1978.
- March 26 – The New York Mets release infielder Bobby Valentine.
- March 27:
  - The New York Mets acquire Richie Hebner and infielder/outfielder José Moreno from the Philadelphia Phillies for right-hander Nino Espinosa. The Phils expect recently signed Pete Rose to take over Hebner's old first base position.
  - The California Angels sign free-agent veteran outfielder Willie Davis, 38, who spent 1977 and 1978 playing in Nippon Professional Baseball.
- March 28 – Pitcher Tom House is released by the Seattle Mariners.
- March 29:
  - The Philadelphia Phillies sign veteran outfielder Del Unser, granted free agency from the Montreal Expos on December 2, 1978. The 34-year-old Unser will be a valuable left-handed pinch hitter and role player for the Phils, batting .455 (five for 11) during the 1980 NLCS and 1980 World Series, and earning a ring as a member of Philadelphia's 1980 world champions.
  - The New York Mets release third baseman Lenny Randle.

=== April ===
- April 4 – The 1979 championship season begins with almost all MLB umpires on the picket lines. The only exceptions are Paul Pryor of the National League and Ted Hendry of the American League, who signed their contracts before the strike vote was taken and take the field on the advice of MLUA executive director Richie Phillips. Later this month, Pryor and Hendry notify their league presidents that they are joining their union brethren in the walkout. The leagues hire retired MLB arbiters, eight minor-league umpires, and amateur officials as "strikebreakers" during the work stoppage.
- April 7:
  - In the earliest no-hitter in major league history, the Houston Astros' Ken Forsch shuts down the Atlanta Braves 6–0. His brother, the St. Louis Cardinals' Bob Forsch, had hurled a no-hitter the previous season against the Philadelphia Phillies—making them the first big league brothers to each toss a no-hitter.
  - The Los Angeles Dodgers trade right-handed starting pitcher Rick Rhoden to the Pittsburgh Pirates for southpaw starter Jerry Reuss. Although Rhoden, 25, makes only one appearance in 1979 before he undergoes season-ending shoulder surgery, he becomes a dependable member of the Pirates' rotation the following year through 1986. The 29-year-old Reuss, likewise, establishes himself as a Dodger, twice winning 18 games and taking a regular turn in the rotation through April 10, 1987.
- April 10 – Houston Astros pitcher J. R. Richard fires six wild pitches in a game, setting a major league record.
- April 11 – The start-up, Triple-A-level Inter-American League, under the leadership of Roberto Maduro, begins play with six independently operated franchises located in the Dominican Republic, Panama, Puerto Rico, the United States (Miami), and Venezuela. It's the first new Triple-A league in Organized Baseball since the American Association was reborn in 1969.
- April 13 – The Chicago White Sox trade pitcher Jack Kucek to the Philadelphia Phillies for a "player to be named later". On July 10, the White Sox receive hard-hitting utility infielder Jim Morrison from the Phils to complete the deal.
- April 15 – The New York Mets sign 16-year-old infielder Jose Oquendo as a free agent.
- April 17 – The Oakland Athletics defeat the Seattle Mariners 6–5 before only 653 fans at the Oakland–Alameda County Coliseum, and some reports say that as few as 250 people attend the night game.
- April 19:
  - New York Yankees' ace closer Rich Gossage breaks his right thumb in a clubhouse fight with teammate Cliff Johnson. Gossage will miss almost two months, while 1978 American League Cy Young Award winner Ron Guidry voluntarily replaces him in the bullpen for a short time.
  - The Pittsburgh Pirates and New York Mets exchange veteran shortstops, with the Bucs obtaining Tim Foli, 28, from New York for Frank Taveras, 29. Both become regulars for their new teams.
- April 24 – The Toronto Blue Jays sign their shortstop of the future, 16-year-old Tony Fernández of San Pedro de Macorís, Dominican Republic. Fernández will enter MLB in 1983, help turn the Blue Jays into a winner, and win four consecutive Gold Glove Awards and make three AL All-Star teams through 1990. Then, after being traded away, he will return to Toronto in 1993 to lash 14 hits in 45 at bats (.311) in the postseason and collect nine RBIs in the six-game 1993 World Series along with a world championship ring.

=== May ===
- May 2 – Bill Lucas, 43, director of player personnel and de facto general manager of the Atlanta Braves—the first African-American to attain GM responsibilities and the highest-ranking Black executive in MLB—suffers an early-morning, massive brain hemorrhage at his home. He dies three days later without regaining consciousness.
- May 9:
  - At the Astrodome, the St. Louis Cardinals and Houston are tied 4–4 in the bottom of the ninth inning with the Astros' Jimmy Sexton on first base with no outs, when Terry Puhl lays down a sacrifice bunt. The Cardinals attempt to get the lead runner on the play; however, second base umpire (then a "replacement umpire" working during the ongoing arbiter strike) Dave Pallone calls Sexton safe, claiming that Garry Templeton never touched the bag. During the ensuing argument, Pallone ejects Cardinals manager Ken Boyer, first baseman Keith Hernandez and catcher Ted Simmons, and players on the Cardinal bench begin throwing bats and helmets onto the field in protest. As a result, Pallone orders the entire Cardinals squad into their clubhouse, allowing players only to come onto the field as needed. The Redbirds get out of the inning without a run scoring; however, they lose 5–4 in the 16th inning on a run-scoring single by the Astros' Bob Watson.
  - The Pittsburgh Pirates defeat the Atlanta Braves 17–9 at Atlanta Fulton County Stadium in a bizarre ejection- and hit by pitch-marred game that features grand slam home runs hit on both sides, by Gary Matthews for the Braves and John Milner for the Pirates. In the fifth inning, the Braves' Phil Niekro is hit by a pitch by Don Robinson while swinging the bat, but awarded first base, prompting a heated argument from Pirates' manager Chuck Tanner and coach Joe Lonnett. Both are thrown out of the game by replacement umpire Hank Rountree, but refuse to leave the Bucs' dugout. The Pirates play the game under protest over the HBP call, and the Braves file a protest as well because Tanner and Lonnett did not exit the dugout in a timely manner after ejection. Neither protest will be upheld (Tanner and Lonnett eventually repair to the clubhouse). Later, Rennie Stennett and Dave Parker of the Pirates are ejected, Stennett in the seventh inning for arguing a call at second base and Parker in the ninth for charging the mound after being hit by a pitch from Gene Garber. In addition, Rowland Office of the Braves is ejected in the ninth for charging the mound after two close inside pitches by Kent Tekulve.
- May 11 – The New York Yankees purchase the contract of left-hander Jim Kaat, 40, from the Philadelphia Phillies.
- May 13 – The Atlanta Braves name John Mullen, 54, to replace the late Bill Lucas as general manager. Mullen, assistant general manager of the Houston Astros since 1967, previously worked in the Braves' front office between 1947 and 1966, including a stint as farm system director. Lucas, 43, died from a cerebral hemorrhage on May 5; he was baseball's first Black general manager.
- May 16 – National League owners approve the purchase of the Houston Astros by an ownership group led by naval architect and marine engineer Dr. John McMullen, a former limited partner in George Steinbrenner's syndicate that owns the New York Yankees. McMullen's consortium pays $19 million to Ford Motor Credit Company for the former holdings of FMCC debtor Roy Hofheinz.
- May 17 – Dave Kingman of the Chicago Cubs hits three home runs and Mike Schmidt of the Philadelphia Phillies belts two, the second of which proves to be the game-winner in the tenth inning, as the Phillies beat the Cubs 23–22 at Wrigley Field. Bill Buckner slugs a grand slam and collects seven RBIs for Chicago. The game includes a then MLB-record 11 home runs and 50 hits.
- May 18 – The end of the 1979 Major League umpires strike is hailed by players and managers as union members return to work. The settlement provides umpires with in-season vacations, pay hikes, and pension and 401(k) plans. It also results in the permanent hiring of the eight minor-league arbiters who crossed picket lines: Derryl Cousins, Dallas Parks, Fred Spenn and John Shulock of the American League, and Fred Brocklander, Steve Fields, Lanny Harris and Dave Pallone of the National League. However, ostracism by and lingering bitterness from the union umpires will plague the eight former replacement umpires over their careers.
- May 21 – Batting ninth for the Toronto Blue Jays, Danny Ainge makes his MLB debut. Ainge collects three hits in four at bats and drives in a run as Toronto defeats the Cleveland Indians 8–1. While Ainge will play just three seasons for the Blue Jays, he'll go on to greater fame for a five-decade-long career in the NBA as a shooting guard, coach, television broadcaster, and front-office executive, during which he will win three titles as a player and executive for the Boston Celtics.
- May 25 – Starter Ross Baumgarten and reliever Randy Scarbery pitch the first combined one-hitter in Chicago White Sox history, defeating Nolan Ryan and the California Angels 6–1 at Comiskey Park.
- May 28 – After Texas Rangers first baseman Mike Jorgensen is hit in the head by a pitch from Boston Red Sox pitcher Andy Hassler, doctors discover a blood clot in Jorgensen's brain, which apparently caused a grand mal seizure that could have proved fatal. Apart from a pinch-hitting appearance on May 31, Jorgensen does not return to the active roster July 1, but he goes only eight for 63 for the rest of the 1979 season.
- May 31 – Detroit Tigers pitcher Pat Underwood makes his major league debut against his brother, Tom, pitching for the Toronto Blue Jays. Both brothers hold the opposing team scoreless until Tom surrendered a solo home run to Jerry Morales leading off the eighth.

=== June ===
- June 5:
  - At the Astrodome, Steve Carlton of the Philadelphia Phillies shuts out Houston on one hit, Jeffrey Leonard's seventh-inning single. The Phils bang out 17 hits, including two singles from Carlton himself, and rout the Astros, 8–0.
  - In the June amateur draft, the Kansas City Royals use their fourth overall pick to draft the University of Pittsburgh's Dan Marino, a right-handed pitcher. In the 17th round, they select Stanford's John Elway, an outfielder. Neither two-sport star will sign with the Royals, and they will go on to record-breaking careers as quarterbacks in the National Football League.
    - The Los Angeles Dodgers, meanwhile, select right-hander Orel Hershiser in the 17th round (440th overall) out of Bowling Green State University. They sign Hershiser almost immediately and in his 13 seasons (1983–1995) as a Dodger, he becomes a three-time National League All-Star and, in 1988, wins 23 games, the NL Cy Young Award, World Series MVP Award, and a World Series ring. Moreover, he sets a new MLB record by throwing 591/3 consecutive scoreless innings between August 30, 1988 and April 5, 1989.
- June 12 – In a move that stuns baseball, the Detroit Tigers fire first-year manager Les Moss and replace him with Sparky Anderson, signing him to a five-year contract with an annual salary of $125,000. Anderson, 45, was dismissed by the Cincinnati Reds in November 1978 after his nine years at the helm produced five National League West championships, four NL pennants and World Series rings in 1975 and 1976. The Tigers are 27–26 but have won 11 of their last 16 games under Moss dating to May 27. Bound for the Baseball Hall of Fame, Anderson will pilot the Tigers through the end of the 1995 season, winning two AL East titles and both the 1984 American League pennant and World Series; Moss, 54, stays in baseball as a pitching coach but never receives another chance to manage.
- June 13 – The Boston Red Sox make two trades. They deal veteran first baseman George Scott to the Kansas City Royals for outfielder Tom Poquette, then acquire first-sacker Bob Watson from the Houston Astros for pitchers Pete Ladd and Bobby Sprowl (player to be named later/PTBNL). Hitting only .224, former eight-time Gold Glove Award winner Scott, 35, is in the midst of what will be his 14th and last MLB season. Watson, 32, a 14-year Astro veteran, bats .337 for the Bosox with 105 hits in 84 games before departing as a free agent during the off-season.
- June 14:
  - The San Diego Padres trade first baseman Mike Hargrove to the Cleveland Indians in exchange for outfielder Paul Dade.
  - Nolan Ryan of the California Angels pitches a complete game in a 10–2 win over the Toronto Blue Jays. Blue Jays pitcher Phil Huffman last only 11/3 innings, surrendering seven runs.
- June 15 – At the "no-waivers" trading deadline then in effect, the New York Yankees send DH Cliff Johnson to the Indians for left-hander Don Hood, and deal outfielder/pinch hitter Jay Johnstone to the San Diego Padres for right-hander Dave Wehrmeister.
- June 18:
  - Bob Lemon is fired as manager of the defending World Series champion New York Yankees after a sluggish 34–31 start. Billy Martin, originally not slated to take over until the 1980 season, is brought back early by George Steinbrenner, drawing the ire of Reggie Jackson.
  - At the Astrodome, the New York Mets and Houston Astros battle into the 18th inning to settle a 2–2 tie before Craig Reynolds' RBI single drives in Reggie Baldwin with Houston's winning run. The Mets, who tallied twice in the first inning, are shut out the rest of the way by five Astro pitchers.
- June 23 – At Olympic Stadium, Steve Rogers, the Montreal Expos' ace starting pitcher, one-hits the Philadelphia Phillies, 3–0. Dave Rader's eighth-inning single is the Phils' only safety. In winning, the Expos—enjoying the finest season yet in their eleven-year history—increase their NL East lead to 4½ games over the St. Louis Cardinals.
- June 24 – In a 5–1 loss to the Rangers, Rickey Henderson debuts for the Oakland Athletics. He singles and doubles for the first two of his 3,055 career regular-season hits, and steals the first of his all-time best 1,406 bases.
- June 26 – Outfielder Bobby Murcer returns to the New York Yankees after being acquired in a trade with the Chicago Cubs for minor-league pitcher Paul Semall. During his 1969–1974 star turn as the Yankees' right- and center-fielder, he had hit 139 home runs, made four American League All-Star teams, and won a Gold Glove Award.
- June 28 – The San Francisco Giants acquire pitchers Al Holland, Ed Whitson and Fred Breining from the Pittsburgh Pirates in exchange for third baseman Bill Madlock, second baseman Lenny Randle and pitcher Dave Roberts. Madlock (who hits .328 in 85 games) and shortstop Tim Foli (.291 in 133 games since his April 19 acquisition) will play key roles in the Pirates' pennant drive and postseason.
- June 30 – Down to the bare minimum of four teams after two clubs dropped out June 17, the Triple-A Inter-American League ceases operations only 80 days after its debut. The Miami Amigos, managed by Davey Johnson, post the best record (51–21), with the Caracas Metropolitanos (37–27) finishing second.

=== July ===
- July 4:
  - Steve Carlton of the Philadelphia Phillies fires his second one-hitter in 30 days, and scores the only run of the game, defeating the New York Mets, 1–0, at Veterans Stadium. Elliott Maddox doubles in the seventh for the Mets' lone "knock". Future Hall-of-Famer Carlton walks none and fans nine during his fifth career one-hit game.
  - At the unofficial half-way point of the MLB season there are three close divisional races. The Texas Rangers (47–34) and California Angels (48–35), expansion teams born in 1961 who've never made the postseason in the 19 years of their existence, are in a virtual tie at the top of the American League West Division, while the Minnesota Twins (43–35) are 2½ out. In the AL East, the Baltimore Orioles (54–27) have the best record in MLB, but are only 3½ games in front of the Boston Red Sox (49–29). In the NL East, the 11-year-old Montreal Expos (45–28) remain hopeful of their first-ever playoff berth, 5½ lengths in front of the Pittsburgh Pirates (40–34). The only seeming shoo-in is in the NL West, where the 18-year-old Houston Astros (52–31)—like the Rangers, Angels and Expos an expansion team from the 1960s—appear a lock for their first playoff appearance, leading the Cincinnati Reds (41–40) by ten full games.
- July 6 – The Los Angeles Dodgers purchase the contract of left-handed pitcher Fernando Valenzuela, 18, from Leones de Yucatán of the Mexican League.
- July 7 – Hall-of-Fame-bound Mike Schmidt of the Philadelphia Phillies belts three home runs and drives in five runs, but his club bows to the San Francisco Giants, 8–6, at Veterans Stadium. It's Schmidt's first of two career three-homer games, although he slugged an MLB-record-tying four (in ten innings) at Wrigley Field on April 17, 1976.
- July 11 – At the Kingdome, the Seattle Mariners chase Tommy John from the mound in the bottom of the first inning, scoring nine runs and going on to defeat John's New York Yankees, 16–1. John's record falls to 13–4 and his ERA rises by 0.39 to 2.62.
- July 12 – The Detroit Tigers win the first game of a scheduled doubleheader against the Chicago White Sox, 4–1, on Disco Demolition Night at Chicago's Comiskey Park. Thousands of young fans swarm onto the field between the games, damaging the field and causing mayhem throughout the stadium. The White Sox are forced to forfeit the second game.
- July 13:
  - In a rare event, Nolan Ryan of the California Angels and Steve Renko of the Boston Red Sox take separate no-hitters into the ninth inning before they both lose the no-hit bids.
    - Ryan's no-hit bid against the New York Yankees benefits from some questionable official scoring; Jim Spencer's one-out, eighth inning drive to center that Angels centerfielder Rick Miller barely got a glove on is ruled an error. In the ninth, Thurman Munson reaches on an error by shortstop Jim Anderson. Two batters later, Reggie Jackson singles to center to unquestionably break up the no-hitter. The next batter, Lou Piniella, hits a sacrifice fly to score Munson, and break up the shutout. The run is, however, unearned. Ryan's Angels defeat the Yankees, 6–1.
    - Renko's no-hit bid against the Oakland Athletics is broken up by Rickey Henderson with one out. After recording a second out, Renko walks Mitchell Page, and is pulled in favor of Bill Campbell by Red Sox manager Don Zimmer. Campbell strikes out the only batter he faces, Dave Revering to earn the save; however, Renko is denied the shutout as a result. The Red Sox defeat the A's, 2–0. Ryan's feat, however, receives considerably more attention as the game is nationally televised on ABC's Monday Night Baseball and Ryan (while pitching the game) was on the ensuing issue's cover of Sports Illustrated.
  - In a marathon, 17-inning contest at County Stadium, the Milwaukee Brewers score twice in the home half of the final frame to overcome a short-lived 3–2 deficit and defeat the visiting Cleveland Indians, 4–3.
- July 17 – The National League wins its eighth straight All-Star Game, 7–6, at Seattle. Lee Mazzilli homers to tie the game in the eighth, and walks in the ninth to bring in the winning run. Dave Parker, with two outstanding throws, is named the MVP, and Pete Rose appears in the game playing first base, making him the only player in MLB history to appear in the game at five different positions in the field in his All-Star game career.
- July 19 – Al Rosen resigns as president of the New York Yankees following a series of disagreements with principal owner George Steinbrenner. After a stint with Bally's casino operations in Atlantic City, the 1953 AL MVP will resume his executive career in baseball the following season in the National League with the Houston Astros.
- July 20 – Le Grand Orange returns to Montréal when the Expos acquire Rusty Staub from the Detroit Tigers for cash and a minor-league "player to be named later". Staub, 35, was the Expos' first star, playing for the expansion team from 1969–1971. In this second stint, he will appear in 38 games as a first baseman, outfielder and pinch hitter through the end of the season, then be traded back to the American League, where he can serve as a designated hitter.
- July 22 – After his Cleveland Indians drop a doubleheader to the Milwaukee Brewers and fall to 43–52, 20 games out of first place, Jeff Torborg is fired as manager and replaced by coach Dave Garcia. Torborg, 37, has led the Tribe to a 157–201 (.439) record since taking the reins on June 19, 1977.
- July 23 – At light-less Wrigley Field, the Cincinnati Reds and home-standing Chicago Cubs resume a May 10 game that was suspended in the top of the tenth inning and the teams knotted at 7–7. Both teams score in the 11th frame, then battle into the 18th inning tied, eight-all. In the home half of the 18th, Steve Ontiveros' one-out single plates Ken Henderson and delivers a 9–8 Cub victory.
- July 24 – Carl Yastrzemski of the Boston Red Sox hits his 400th home run off Oakland Athletics pitcher Mike Morgan in the seventh inning of the Red Sox's 7–3 win over the Athletics at Fenway Park.
- July 27 – Bert Blyleven of the Pittsburgh Pirates pitches a 9–1 complete game victory against the Montreal Expos. However, he also strikes out five times as a hitter in the game, becoming the only pitcher in major league history to do so.
- July 30 – The New York Yankees and Texas Rangers make a four for four swap, with five of the men exchanged termed "players to be named later", or "PTBNL". In the deal, the Rangers send pitchers Ray Fontenot (PTBNL) and Gene Nelson (PTBNL), minor-league infielder Amos Lewis, and outfielder Oscar Gamble to the Yankees for three pitchers, all players to be named later (Neal Mersch, Bob Polonsky and Mark Softy), and outfielder Mickey Rivers. The deal closes the book on Rivers' three-plus years in the Bronx: he hits .299 in 490 regular-season games, with 93 stolen bases, and wins two World Series rings.

=== August ===
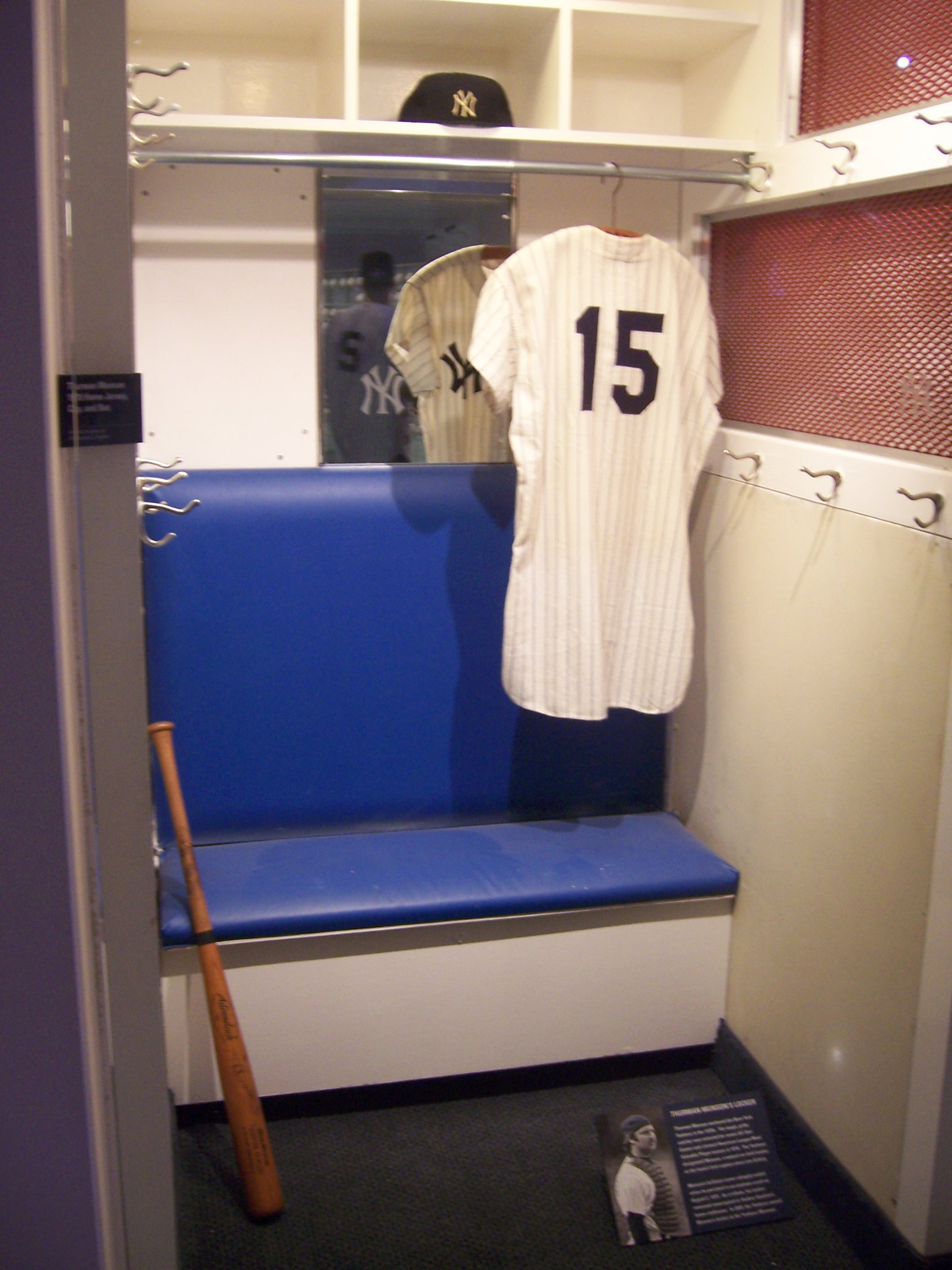
Thurman Munson's locker, with retired #15 uniform, at Yankee Stadium's museum

- August 1 – The New York Yankees' team captain and seven-time All-Star catcher, Thurman Munson, starts at first base against the Chicago White Sox at Comiskey Park. He walks and strikes out in two plate appearances before he's replaced by Jim Spencer in the third inning of today's 9–1 New York victory. It will prove to be Munson's last major-league game.
- August 2:
  - In a tragedy that shocks the Yankees and the baseball world, Munson dies at the controls of his newly purchased private jet when it crashes short of a runway at Akron-Canton Airport. Munson, 32, a licensed pilot with extensive experience flying propeller-driven aircraft, was practicing touch-and-go landings of his twin-engine Cessna Citation 501 jet while visiting his family during an off-day. Two passengers—a flight instructor and a friend of Munson's—are injured but survive the crash. (See also Deaths entry for this date below.)
  - The Chicago White Sox fire manager Don Kessinger and promote Tony La Russa from Triple-A Iowa to replace him. Kessinger, 37, was scuffling as a player-manager, hitting only .200 in 56 games while leading the ChiSox to a 46–60 record; they're 14 games behind the California Angels and in fifth place in the AL West. This is the first MLB managerial assignment in the 34-year-old La Russa's Hall-of-Fame career.
  - Jerry Hoffberger, Baltimore brewer who has been an owner of the Orioles since 1954 and sole owner since 1965, sells the club to Washington, D.C., lawyer Edward Bennett Williams for $12.3 million. Williams is the former owner of the Washington Redskins of the National Football League.
- August 3 – Over 51,000 mourners attend a memorial service for Thurman Munson at Yankee Stadium, who was killed the previous day in a plane crash.
- August 4 – Phil Niekro breaks multiple wild pitch records, tying a major league record set earlier in the season by throwing six wild pitches. Four of these wild pitches were thrown in the 5th inning, which broke a National League record for most wild pitches thrown in a single inning.
- August 5 – Fred Lynn hits his 100th career home run, helping the Boston Red Sox beat Milwaukee Brewers 7–2.
- August 6 – The entire New York Yankee team flies to Canton, Ohio for Thurman Munson's funeral. Hours later, the team returns to New York City and defeats the Baltimore Orioles 5–4 at Yankee Stadium, before a national viewing audience on ABC's Monday Night Baseball. Bobby Murcer, one of Munson's best friends, drives in all five Yankee runs with a three-run home run in the seventh inning and a two-run single in the bottom of the ninth.
- August 9 – The death at 75 of one of baseball's most powerful and controversial owners, the Dodgers' Walter O'Malley, stirs fresh debate over his legacy. (See Deaths entry for this date below.) The Dodgers will remain in the O'Malley family, with son Peter as president, until 1998.
- August 12 – The Texas Rangers, in fourth place in the AL West but only 6½ games out of the lead, acquire veteran first baseman Willie Montañez from the New York Mets for two PTBNLs, right-handed pitching prospect Ed Lynch and former Met first baseman Mike Jorgensen, who will be sent to New York during the off-season.
- August 13 – The St. Louis Cardinals' Lou Brock slashes a single off the hand of Chicago Cubs pitcher Dennis Lamp for his 3000th career hit in a 3–2 Cardinal win at Busch Memorial Stadium.
- August 15 – Mike Flanagan of the Baltimore Orioles gives up a lead-off homer to the first batter he faces, Jim Morrison of the Chicago White Sox, then shuts down Chicago for 12 innings at Memorial Stadium. Then, eventual Hall-of-Fame slugger Eddie Murray wins the game for the Orioles, 2–1, by stealing home. Flanagan's 12-inning complete game win improves his record to 16–7.
- August 21–22 – The New York Mets defeat the Houston Astros 5–0 at Shea Stadium in a game that ends three different times and takes two days to finish. In the ninth inning with two out and no baserunners, Houston's Jeffrey Leonard flies out to left field to seemingly end the contest, but it's ruled that New York shortstop Frank Taveras had called time before the "final" pitch was delivered, forcing the Mets to return to the field. Leonard then singles to keep the Astros alive, but is sent back to hit when the Mets' first baseman, Ed Kranepool, does not take his position on time. Leonard then flies out again to apparently end the contest a second time. But Astro manager Bill Virdon plays the game under protest, which National League president Chub Feeney, in attendance at the stadium, upholds an hour later. Feeney orders that the game be resumed the following night, August 22, with Leonard on first and two out. Finally, the August 21 game is officially over when José Cruz makes the Astros' 27th out by grounding out to Mets' second baseman Doug Flynn.
- August 22 – At Riverfront Stadium, Johnny Bench breaks Frank Robinson's record for most home runs by a Cincinnati Red. His shot, the 325th home run of his career (all with the Reds), comes off Stan Bahnsen in the fourth inning of the Reds' 7–2 victory over the Montreal Expos.
- August 24 – The Philadelphia Phillies retire eventual Hall of Famer Richie Ashburn's jersey #1. During Ashburn's 12 seasons (1948–1959) as the Phils' centerfielder, he won two National League batting titles—in 1955 (.338) and 1958 (.350)—exceeded the 200-hit mark three times, and was named to four NL All-Star squads. He has been a member of the club's broadcasting team since 1963.
- August 25:
  - In one of 1979's longest games, the surging Pittsburgh Pirates tie the San Diego Padres with two out in the top of the ninth, forcing extra innings, then battle the Padres into the 19th frame. Pittsburgh shortstop Tim Foli then delivers the decisive run with an RBI single and Dave Roberts holds off San Diego in the home half for a 4–3 Pirate victory. The Bucs' August record improves to 17–8, which has enabled them to take the lead in the NL East race.
  - At Exhibition Stadium, the California Angels bash the Toronto Blue Jays, 24–2, on the strength of 26 hits, including five home runs.
- August 29 – In his first pitching appearance in the Major Leagues in his 11-year career, Kansas City Royals utility player Jerry Terrell entered the game in relief against the New York Yankees and got three outs on just three pitches in the ninth inning of a 17–3 loss.
- August 31 – The disappointing, three-time NL East champion Phillies—sitting at 65–67, in fifth place in the division and 12½ games out of first—fire manager Danny Ozark, their skipper since 1973. Former pitcher and current farm system director Dallas Green is named as his replacement. Ozark departs Philadelphia with a 594–510 record and three division titles.

=== September ===
- September 3 – At the conclusion of the Labor Day holiday weekend, there are three tight divisional races. In the National League West, the onrushing Cincinnati Reds (78–60, after a 19–7 August) have overcome the Houston Astros' once-commanding lead, and hold a half-game advantage over the 77–60 Astros. In the NL East, the Pittsburgh Pirates (82–55) have ridden their strong July and August showing (41–20 overall) to take a 2½-game lead over the Montreal Expos (76–54). In the AL West, the resilient California Angels (75–63), who only days before regained their season-long front-running position, are 1½ games in front of the Kansas City Royals (73–64). All those races will remain competitive into the final week of September. The lone exception is the AL East, where the Baltimore Orioles (90–46) are a comfortable 8½ lengths ahead of the Milwaukee Brewers (83–56).
- September 4 – Richard Dotson makes his MLB debut for the Chicago White Sox. He lasts only 11/3 innings, giving up five runs and finished with a 33.75 earned run average. However, the White Sox rebound to win 11–7, and Dotson also will rebound to pitch 11 years in the majors.
- September 5 – The spiraling San Francisco Giants, who've gone 9–25 since July 31, fire third-year manager Joe Altobelli and name third-base coach Dave Bristol to replace him. Altobelli, hailed after his 1978 Giants posted a strong 89–73 record, has led San Francisco to a 225–239 (.485) overall mark since Opening Day 1977. He'll receive a second chance in 1983 when he is named Earl Weaver's successor with the Baltimore Orioles. The Giants are Bristol's fourth MLB managerial assignment since July 1966.
- September 6 – By beating the Chicago Cubs, 1–0, at Wrigley Field, the Montreal Expos advance to within a game of first place in the NL East. David Palmer fires a six-hit shutout and future Hall-of-Famer Gary Carter hits the decisive home run in the ninth inning.
- September 8 – Kirk Gibson makes his major league debut for the Detroit Tigers, striking out as a pinch hitter for Dave Stegman in Detroit's 5–4 loss to the New York Yankees.
- September 11:
  - Dave Concepción and George Foster hit back-to-back home runs in the seventh inning off Houston Astros ace reliever Joe Sambito and the Cincinnati Reds hold off the Astros, 9–8. The Reds entered the game trailing the Astros by a half-game and, by winning, move into first place to stay in the National League West.
  - Tim Raines makes his major league debut. He is inserted into the game as a pinch runner for catcher Gary Carter in the Montreal Expos' 8–6 win over the Chicago Cubs.
- September 12 – Carl Yastrzemski of the Boston Red Sox records his 3,000th career hit with a single off right-hander Jim Beattie during a 9–2 win over the rival New York Yankees at Fenway Park. The 40-year-old Yastrzemski is the first American League player to reach both 3,000 hits and 400 home runs.
- September 15 – As part of a 10–2 win over the Baltimore Orioles, Bob Watson of the Red Sox hits for the cycle—becoming the first player to accomplish this feat in both major leagues. The former Houston Astro had previously hit for the cycle June 24, 1977.
- September 17 – George Brett hits his 20th triple of the season. He is the first player since Willie Mays in 1957 to join the 20–20–20 club.
- September 22 – The Baltimore Orioles (99–53) sew up their first AL East title since 1974 when the second-place Milwaukee Brewers (90–64) drop a 6–3 home contest to the Minnesota Twins, mathematically eliminating them from the divisional race.
- September 23:
  - Lou Brock steals the 938th and final base of his career, breaking Billy Hamilton's all-time National League record. Brock's St. Louis Cardinals defeat the New York Mets 7–4 in ten innings.
  - Herman Franks, 65, steps down as manager of the 78–77 Chicago Cubs after posting a 238–241 (.497) mark since Opening Day 1977. Coach Joey Amalfitano takes the helm for the seven games remaining in the championship season. Preston Gómez, third-base coach of the Los Angeles Dodgers and former skipper of the San Diego Padres and Houston Astros, will be named the Cubs' next "permanent" manager on October 2.
- September 24 – Pete Rose collects his 200th hit of the season, giving him ten seasons with at least 200 hits. This breaks the record set by Ty Cobb.
- September 24–26 – The two top teams in the NL East, the Montreal Expos (93–60) and Pittsburgh Pirates (93–61), meet for a four-game showdown at Three Rivers Stadium. By the time the series ends on September 26, the Pirates will take the divisional lead with three victories in four games.
  - On September 24, the teams split a doubleheader. Bert Blyleven and Kent Tekulve combine to defeat Montreal, 5–2, in Game 1. But in the nightcap, the Expos overcome a 6–2 deficit with five unanswered runs to win, 7–6, on Ellis Valentine's ninth-inning RBI single. With the split, the Expos maintain their half-game lead.
  - On September 25, the Bucs' Willie Stargell belts two homers off Scott Sanderson to power a 10–4 Pittsburgh victory. Ed Ott also knocks in three runs.
  - On the 26th, the Pirates overwhelm the Expos and their ace starter, Steve Rogers, and win 10–1 behind Bruce Kison. The Pirates, now 96–62, take a 1½-game lead on the strength of their fifth victory over Montreal (94–63) in their six September meetings.
- September 25 – Behind Frank Tanana's complete game, the 19-year-old California Angels (87–71) earn their first-ever postseason berth, clinching the AL West with a 4–1 triumph over the second-place Kansas City Royals (82–76). The Angels will face the Baltimore Orioles in the 1979 ALCS.
- September 28:
  - Garry Templeton of the St. Louis Cardinals collects his 100th hit of the season while batting right-handed. Having already collected 100 hits while batting left-handed, Templeton is the first player in history to accomplish this. He has batted right-handed, exclusively, for the last week of the 1979 season to get the needed hits.
  - The Cincinnati Reds' Frank Pastore pitches a complete-game 3–0 shutout over the Atlanta Braves, clinching the NL West title for the Reds.
- September 30:
  - The Pittsburgh Pirates defeat the Chicago Cubs, 5–3, at Three Rivers Stadium, while the Montreal Expos are thwarted by Steve Carlton and the Philadelphia Phillies at Olympic Stadium, 2–0, enabling the 98–64 Pirates to clinch their sixth NL East title since 1970. They will face the Cincinnati Reds in the 1979 NLCS, the fourth such meeting over the same span. The 95–65 Expos enjoy their finest season since their 1969 debut, but finish two games behind Pittsburgh.
  - Throwing his third straight complete game victory, Phil Niekro of the Atlanta Braves defeats the Cincinnati Reds 7–2 in his final appearance of 1979. The triumph gives Niekro a 21–20 record and enables him to lead all National League pitchers in both wins and losses—although he ties brother Joe of the Houston Astros for most games won. Phil is the first hurler to win and lose 20 in the same season since fellow knuckleballer Wilbur Wood in 1973.

=== October ===
- October 1 – The San Diego Padres fire second-year manager Roger Craig after a 93-loss season, and replace him with Jerry Coleman, who as an infielder won six World Series rings with the New York Yankees between 1949 and 1957. Coleman, 55, has spent the last 19 years as a baseball broadcaster, and has been the play-by-play "voice of the Padres" on radio since 1972.
- October 2 – After a disappointing, second-place finish in the AL West, the Kansas City Royals fire manager Whitey Herzog, 47, who has led them to a 410–304 (.573) regular season record and three division titles since taking the job on July 25, 1975. Discord between Herzog and owner Ewing Kauffman is later revealed to be the primary reason for the future Hall-of-Fame skipper's dismissal.
- October 3 – The San Diego Padres release pitcher Mickey Lolich, ending the southpaw's 16-season MLB career. The 1968 World Series MVP, who won 217 career regular-season games, is notable for his durability during an era that saw increased reliance on relief pitchers. Lolich exceeded 200 innings pitched for 12 consecutive years (1964–1975) and hurled over 300 innings for four straight seasons (1971–1974)—including 376 innings pitched in 1971.
- October 6 – In Game 4 of the 1979 ALCS, Scott McGregor shuts out the California Angels on six hits, all singles, enabling his Baltimore Orioles to capture their fifth American League pennant since 1966. In the World Series, they will face the National League champion Pittsburgh Pirates, who swept the Cincinnati Reds in three straight games in the NLCS, which finished a day earlier. The Fall Classic will be a reprise of the 1971 World Series, won by the Pirates, four games to three.
- October 17:
  - In Game 7 of the World Series, Willie Stargell hits his third home run of the Series to spark the Pittsburgh Pirates to their third straight win over the Baltimore Orioles, to win the World Series championship. Stargell wins Series MVP honors. The Pirates triumph comes after overcoming a deficit of three-games-to-one.
  - Although his team lost that series, Earl Weaver is named Sporting News Manager of the Year.
  - The Chicago Cubs trade pitcher Donnie Moore to the St. Louis Cardinals for second baseman Mike Tyson.
- October 18 – The Toronto Blue Jays raise eyebrows when they name Bobby Mattick the second manager in club history. At 63, Mattick will be one of the oldest "rookie" pilots in MLB annals, and he is a valuable scout and player development official who has signed high-profile players for the Cincinnati Reds, Houston Astros and Blue Jays since the early 1950s. He succeeds Roy Hartsfield, the Jays' original skipper, fired earlier this month after compiling a 166–318 (.343) record over three seasons.
- October 23:
  - Billy Martin, who led the New York Yankees to a 55–40 (.579) record after he regained the Bombers' managing job on June 19, gets into a barroom fight with Joseph Cooper, a marshmallow salesman from Minnesota. Six days later, the Yankees fire Martin and replace him with Dick Howser, 43, the current head baseball coach of the Florida State Seminoles and the Yanks' former longtime third-base coach.
  - Days after Howser's hiring, Yankees' principal owner George Steinbrenner shuffles his front office, moving general manager Cedric Tallis, 65, up to executive vice president and naming former Yankee infielder Gene Michael, 41, the club's GM for the 1980 season.
- October 24 – Jim Frey, 48, a member of the Baltimore Orioles' coaching staff since 1970, is named to succeed Whitey Herzog as manager of the Kansas City Royals.
- October 31 – The Detroit Tigers obtain third baseman Richie Hebner from the New York Mets for infielder Phil Mankowski and outfielder Jerry Morales.

=== November ===
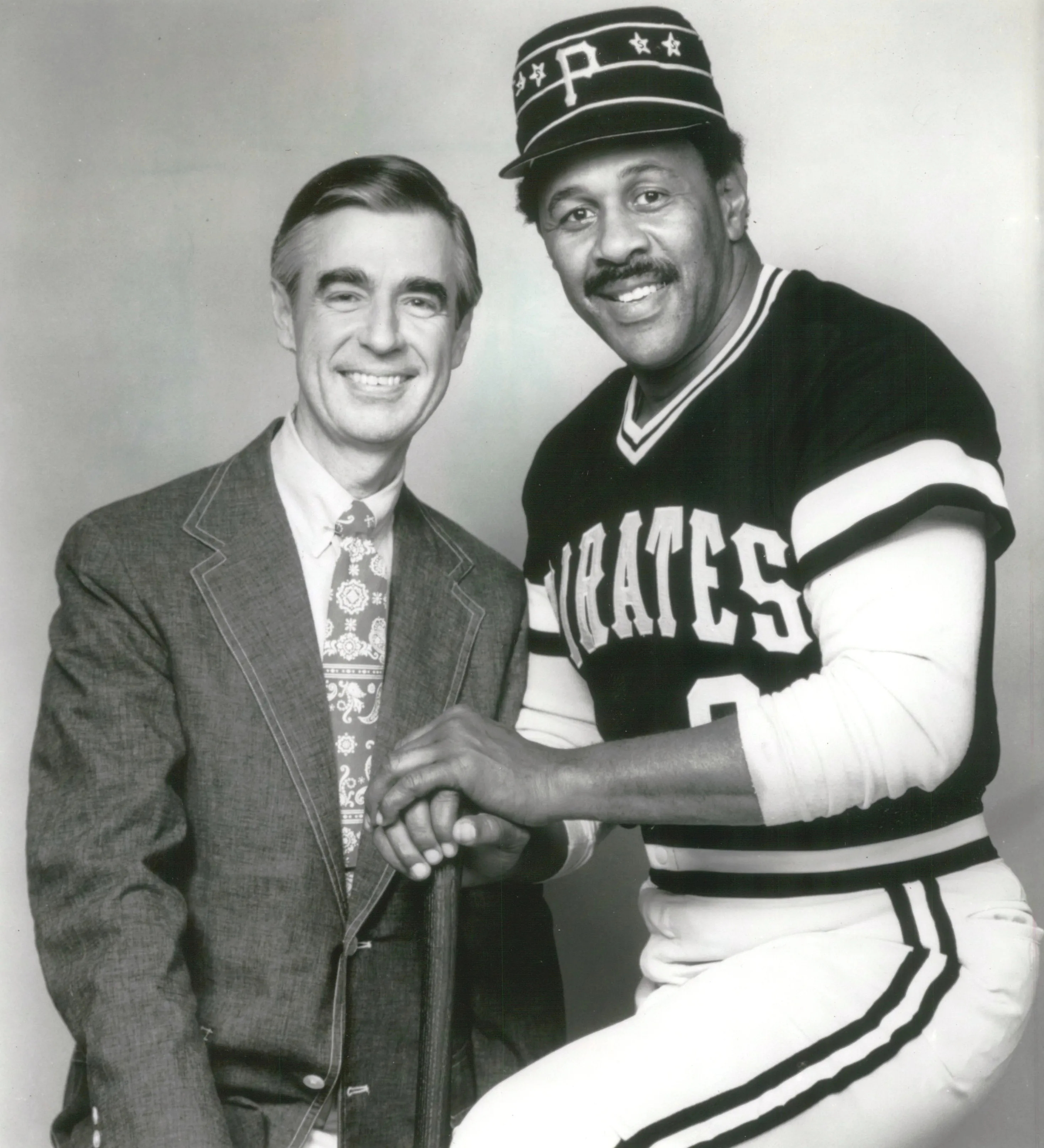
Willie Stargell, with Pittsburgh's "Mister Rogers" (1980)

- November 1:
  - Among the veteran players granted free agency from their 1979 clubs are future Hall-of-Famers Nolan Ryan, Joe Morgan, Tony Pérez and Jim Kaat. In all, 42 players who have played out their 1979 contracts hit the market.
  - The New York Yankees make two headline-worthy trades. In a deal with the Toronto Blue Jays, they acquire pitcher Tom Underwood, catcher Rick Cerone and outfielder Ted Wilborn in exchange for pitcher Paul Mirabella, first baseman Chris Chambliss and second baseman Dámaso García. In the second, they obtain outfielder Ruppert Jones and pitcher Jim Lewis from the Seattle Mariners for pitchers Rick Anderson and Jim Beattie, catcher Jerry Narron and outfielder Juan Beníquez. In 1980, Cerone will be asked to take over the Yankees' regular catching job left vacant by the late Thurman Munson. García will eventually become Toronto's All-Star second baseman.
- November 8 – The Yankees sign two top-ranked veterans who were granted free agency on November 1: first baseman Bob Watson, 33, formerly of the Boston Red Sox, and left-handed hurler and ex-Yankee Rudy May, 35, formerly of the Montreal Expos. In 1980, Watson will bat .307 in 130 games, and the versatile May will win 15 of 20 decisions and lead the American League in earned run average (2.46).
- November 13 – For the first time, there is a tie for the winner of a Most Valuable Player Award. In the National League, Willie Stargell of the world-champion Pittsburgh Pirates and Keith Hernandez of the St. Louis Cardinals are judged co-MVPs by the BBWAA, in custody of the award since 1931. Each man garners 216 points with Stargell receiving ten first-place votes to Hernandez' four and the Redbird first baseman making up points on Stargell down-ballot. Stargell, 39, becomes the oldest person yet to be named NL MVP (since broken by Barry Bonds in 2004). The Pirates thus win (or share) all four "Most Valuable Player" awards for 1979—All-Star Game (Dave Parker), NLCS (Stargell), World Series (Stargell), and the NL's regular season (Stargell)—the first such sweep in Major League history.
- November 14 – The Los Angeles Dodgers sign pitcher Dave Goltz, granted free agency from the Minnesota Twins on November 1.
- November 16:
  - The Boston Red Sox sign first baseman and future DH Tony Pérez, granted free agency from the Montreal Expos on November 1. As a member of the Cincinnati Reds, future Hall-of-Famer Pérez played a key role in defeating the Red Sox in Game 7 of the 1975 World Series with his two-run homer off Bill Lee's "Lee-phus pitch" that put Cincinnati on the scoreboard in the sixth inning.
  - The California Angels sign veteran right-hander Bruce Kison, granted free agency from the Pittsburgh Pirates, also on November 1.
- November 17 – The Los Angeles Dodgers sign relief pitcher Don Stanhouse, granted free agency from the Baltimore Orioles on November 1.
- November 19:
  - In the most expensive free-agent signing since the striking down of the reserve clause in 1975, the Houston Astros sign Nolan Ryan to a four-year, $4.5 million contract. The 32-year-old strikeout king and former Angels mound ace receives the first $1 million a year contract in baseball history.
  - The San Diego Padres sign veteran starting pitcher Rick Wise, granted free agency from the Cleveland Indians.
- November 20:
  - California Angels outfielder and DH Don Baylor wins the American League Most Valuable Player Award for 1979. Baylor receives 20 of 28 first-place votes to become the first Angel ever to win MVP honors. He was pivotal to the Halos' first-ever AL West title and postseason appearance, hitting .296 with 36 home runs and a major league-leading 120 runs scored and 139 runs batted in.
  - The Atlanta Braves sign veteran left-handed reliever Al Hrabosky, who had been granted free agency from the Kansas City Royals.
- November 26:
  - Sportswriters from the BBWAA also create a tie in American League Rookie of the Year Award voting. Third baseman John Castino, who batted .285 for the Minnesota Twins, and shortstop Alfredo Griffin, who hit .287 for the Toronto Blue Jays, each receive seven of the 28 first-place votes. Near-winners include Mark Clear (five votes) and Ross Baumgarten, Ron Davis and Pat Putnam (each with three). The deadlock precipitates a change in the voting system, effective in 1980. The BBWAA has voted for "ROTY" awards since 1947.
  - The San Diego Padres sign veteran left-hander John Curtis, granted free agency from the San Francisco Giants.
- November 28 – Los Angeles Dodgers pitcher Rick Sutcliffe, who posted a 17–10 record with a 3.46 ERA for a sub-.500 team, receives 20 of first-place 24 votes to earn the National League Rookie of the Year honors. Right fielders Jeffrey Leonard of the Houston Astros (three) and Scot Thompson of the Chicago Cubs (one) receive the other votes.

=== December ===
- December 1 – San Diego Padres outfielder Dave Winfield and Texas Rangers third baseman Buddy Bell are first-time honorees as The Sporting News announces the 1979 Gold Glove teams.
- December 5:
  - The Toronto Blue Jays trade first baseman Chris Chambliss and shortstop Luis Gómez to the Atlanta Braves for pitcher Joey McLaughlin, shortstop Pat Rockett and outfielder Barry Bonnell. Chambliss, 30, had been obtained in a multiplayer trade from the New York Yankees on November 1.
  - The California Angels sign veteran shortstop Freddie Patek, granted free agency from the Kansas City Royals.
- December 6:
  - The Braves keep dealing, acquiring right-hander Doyle Alexander and infielder Larvell Blanks, along with $50,000, from the Texas Rangers for pitcher Adrian Devine and shortstop Pepe Frías.
  - After signing Freddie Patek the day before, the Angels make a five-player trade with their division rivals, obtaining veteran right-fielder Al Cowens, infielder Todd Cruz and pitcher Craig Eaton ("PTBNL") from the Royals for first baseman Willie Aikens and shortstop Rance Mulliniks.
  - The Milwaukee Brewers and Baltimore Orioles—also division rivals—make a one for one trade, with the Brewers sending second baseman Lenn Sakata to Baltimore for right-handed pitcher John Flinn.
- December 7:
  - Bobby Bonds' five-year odyssey through the American League ends when the Cleveland Indians swap the 33-year-old outfielder to the St. Louis Cardinals for pitcher John Denny and outfielder Jerry Mumphrey. Bonds, who spent the first seven years of his MLB career in the National League with the San Francisco Giants, making two All-Star teams and winning three Gold Glove Awards, has played for five AL clubs since the start of the 1975 season, with his longest stay consisting of two years (1976–1977) with the California Angels. Still productive, however, Bonds averaged 31 homers over his four healthy AL seasons, and in 1979 posted a robust OPS of .830.
  - The Detroit Tigers deal speedy outfielder Ron LeFlore to the Montreal Expos for left-hander Dan Schatzeder. LeFlore, 31, averaged 49 stolen bases over his six seasons with Detroit, including an AL-best 68 in 1978 and 78 more (second to Willie Wilson) in 1979. He will lead the National League in thefts with 87 in 1980, becoming the first player to each league in that category in the post-1901, modern era.
  - In a separate transaction, the Tigers sell the contract of veteran third baseman Aurelio Rodríguez to the San Diego Padres for $200,000. Rodríguez has spent nine full seasons with in Detroit manning the "hot corner".
- December 10 – The New York Mets trade catching prospect Jody Davis to the St. Louis Cardinals for southpaw pitcher Ray Searage. Davis, 23, was the Double-A Texas League's All-Star catcher in 1979.
- December 12 – The San Francisco Giants sign three veteran free agents who were granted free agency from their 1979 clubs: catcher Milt May (formerly of the Chicago White Sox), infielder Rennie Stennett (Pittsburgh Pirates), and outfielder Jim Wohlford (Kansas City Royals). May and Stennett will be regulars on the 1980 Giants.
- December 19 – The Cleveland Indians sign Jorge Orta, granted free agency from the White Sox on November 1. Outfielder/DH Orta, 29, will be an American League All-Star in 1980.

== Movies ==
- Bleacher Bums (TV)
- The Kid from Left Field (TV)

== Births ==
=== January ===
- January 3:
  - Rosman García
  - Carlos Maldonado
  - Michael Restovich
- January 5 – Rubén Quevedo
- January 15 – Ben Howard
- January 16 – Jack Cust
- January 18 – Wandy Rodríguez
- January 21 – Byung-hyun Kim
- January 22 – Carlos Ruiz
- January 23 – Juan Rincón
- January 25 – Philip Barzilla
- January 26 – Kenny Kelly
- January 28 – Phil Seibel
- January 29 – Lance Niekro

=== February ===
- February 7:
  - Eliézer Alfonzo
  - Humberto Cota
  - Jon Leicester
- February 8:
  - Aaron Cook
  - Ryan Snare
- February 9:
  - Akinori Iwamura
  - Mike Tonis
- February 11:
  - Éric Cyr
  - Chris Mabeus
- February 15 – Luis Ugueto
- February 17 – Josh Willingham
- February 22 – Steve Colyer
- February 23 – Chris Aguila
- February 24:
  - Brian Esposito
  - Dennis Tankersley
- February 25 – Josh Labandeira

=== March ===
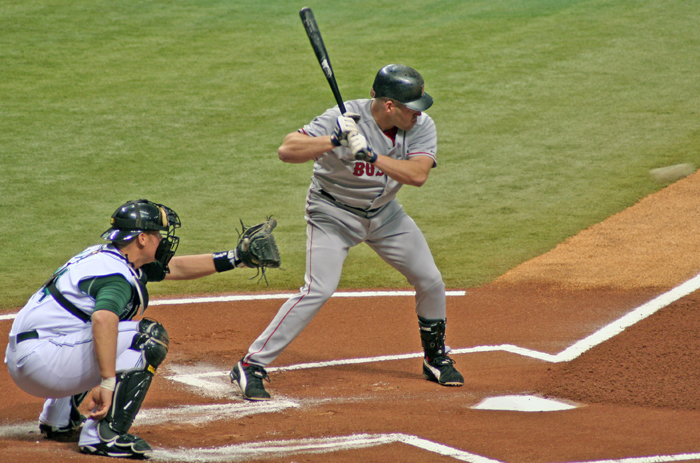
All-Star Kevin Youkilis

- March 1 – Chris Barnwell
- March 3:
  - Jorge Julio
  - John Nelson
- March 6:
  - Clint Barmes
  - Érik Bédard
- March 9 – Koyie Hill
- March 12:
  - Félix Escalona
  - David Williams
- March 13 – Johan Santana
- March 14 – José Núñez
- March 15 – Kevin Youkilis
- March 16 – Hee-seop Choi
- March 20:
  - Shinnosuke Abe
  - Wilfredo Rodríguez
- March 21 – Matt Palmer
- March 22 – Juan Uribe
- March 23 – Mark Buehrle
- March 24 – Norris Hopper
- March 26 – Jason Dubois
- March 27 – Michael Cuddyer
- March 30 – Mike Johnston
- March 31:
  - Josh Kinney
  - Charlie Manning

=== April ===
- April 7:
  - Adrián Beltré
  - Danny Sandoval
- April 8:
  - Jeremy Guthrie
  - Dane Sardinha
- April 12 – Jordan De Jong
- April 16:
  - Justin Huisman
  - Justin Wayne
- April 17 – Jorge Piedra
- April 19 – Nick Gorneault
- April 20 – Sean Green
- April 21 – Terry Tiffee
- April 23:
  - Henry Owens
  - Carlos Silva
  - Rich Thompson
- April 28 – Sean Douglass

=== May ===
- May 1:
  - Brandon Claussen
  - Joe Hietpas
- May 4 – Ryan Jorgensen
- May 9 – Brandon Webb
- May 10 – Tony Álvarez
- May 12 – Travis Dawkins
- May 18 – Adam Peterson
- May 20 – Jayson Werth
- May 23:
  - César Crespo
  - Kirk Saarloos
  - John Webb
- May 24 – Joe Kennedy
- May 25:
  - Trey Lunsford
  - Chris Young
- May 28 – Ryota Igarashi
- May 29 – John Rheinecker

=== June ===
- June 6:
  - Jeremy Affeldt
  - Jesús Feliciano
- June 8 – Pete Orr
- June 9 – Jason Anderson
- June 13:
  - Cory Aldridge
  - Ben Diggins
- June 15 – Matt Smith
- June 20:
  - Scott Patterson
  - Cory Vance
- June 22 – Brad Hawpe
- June 24 – Jason Romano
- June 26 – Luis A. González

=== July ===
- July 4 – Amauri Sanit
- July 6 – Vic Carapazza
- July 10 – Tyrell Godwin
- July 12 – Adam Johnson
- July 13 – Kei Igawa
- July 14 – Bernie Castro
- July 19 – Rick Ankiel
- July 24 – Ryan Speier
- July 28 – John Coppolella
- July 31:
  - J. J. Furmaniak
  - Andy Van Hekken

=== August ===
- August 2:
  - Colby Lewis
  - Humberto Quintero
  - Matt Riley
- August 9 – Ron Flores
- August 10:
  - Dan Johnson
  - Brandon Lyon
- August 11 – Jorge Padilla
- August 12 – D. J. Houlton
- August 13:
  - Román Colón
  - Corey Patterson
  - Jon Switzer
- August 14 – Ángel Santos
- August 15:
  - Ryan Budde
  - Roberto Novoa
- August 19 – Rocky Cherry
- August 20:
  - Franklyn Gracesqui
  - Cory Sullivan
- August 23:
  - Prentice Redman
  - Chris Roberson
- August 26 – Charlie Zink
- August 27:
  - Tommy Murphy
  - Andy Pratt
- August 29:
  - David Sanders
  - Ryan Shealy
  - Eduardo Villacis
- August 30:
  - Scott Richmond
  - Luis Rivas
- August 31:
  - Clay Hensley
  - Shane Loux
  - Tim Raines Jr.
  - Ramón Santiago

=== September ===
- September 5:
  - Cliff Bartosh
  - Ryan Spilborghs
- September 7:
  - Nathan Haynes
  - Brian Stokes
- September 11 – Frank Francisco
- September 16:
  - Chris George
  - Bobby Korecky
- September 18:
  - Kevin Thompson
  - Billy Traber
- September 19:
  - Lenny DiNardo
  - Andrew Good
- September 22 – Charlton Jimerson
- September 24 – Nate Cornejo
- September 26 – Yurendell DeCaster
- September 27 – Jon Garland
- September 28 – Jason Young
- September 29:
  - Shelley Duncan
  - Joe Thurston

=== October ===
- October 9 – Alay Soler
- October 10 – Brad Ziegler
- October 11 – Shane Youman
- October 14 – Duaner Sánchez
- October 17:
  - John Ennis
  - Gil Velazquez
- October 20 – Choo Freeman
- October 21:
  - Khalil Greene
  - Gabe Gross
  - Steve Holm
  - Tim Spooneybarger
- October 22 – Eli Whiteside
- October 23:
  - Ramón Castro
  - Bud Smith
- October 25:
  - Jeremy Brown
  - Tony Torcato
- October 28 – Bobby Cramer
- October 30 – Jason Bartlett

=== November ===
- November 1 – Coco Crisp
- November 4 – Ezequiel Astacio
- November 6 – Adam LaRoche
- November 7 – Willie Collazo
- November 9:
  - Dave Bush
  - Adam Dunn
- November 11 – J. R. House
- November 13 – Gerald Laird
- November 15 – John Stephens
- November 18 – Steve Bechler
- November 19:
  - John-Ford Griffin
  - Ryan Howard
- November 20 – Lino Urdaneta
- November 21 – Bárbaro Cañizares
- November 24 – Horacio Ramírez
- November 25 – Matt Tupman
- November 26 – Jeff Fulchino
- November 27:
  - Carlos Mendoza
  - Jonathan Van Every
- November 28:
  - Nook Logan
  - Mike Schultz
- November 29 – Francis Beltrán

=== December ===
- December 2 – José Morban
- December 3 – Eric Hull
- December 4 – Manny Gonzalez
- December 7 – Ryan Theriot
- December 9 – Eric Stults
- December 12 – Garrett Atkins
- December 15 – Kevin Cameron
- December 17 – David Kelton
- December 19:
  - Chip Ambres
  - Rafael Soriano
- December 20 – David DeJesus
- December 24 – Joe Valentine
- December 26 – J. C. Boscán
- December 28 – Bill Hall

== Deaths ==
=== January ===
- January 4 – Bobby Murray, 80, third baseman in ten games for 1923 Washington Senators.
- January 5 – George Washburn, 64, pitcher who spent 16 years in minor leagues, but appeared in only one major-league game, on May 4, 1941, for the New York Yankees.
- January 6 – Jesse Douglas, 62, infielder who appeared for three Negro American League teams during five seasons between 1940 and 1945.
- January 9:
  - Hinkey Haines, 80, professional baseball and football player; outfielder over 12 minor-league campaigns and a single major-league season, appearing in 28 games for 1923 American League champion New York Yankees, then two games in 1923 World Series; in his final MLB contest, in Game 6, scored winning tally as a pinch runner during the Yanks' eighth-inning, Series-deciding rally, helping them win first world title; played halfback in the National Football League between 1925 and 1932.
  - Charley Stis, 94, who spent more than six decades in professional baseball as a player, manager, scout and umpire.
- January 21 – Sam Leslie, 73, line drive-hitting first baseman who played in 822 games over all or part of ten seasons for the New York Giants (1929–1933 and 1936–1938) and Brooklyn Dodgers (1933–1935); batted .304 lifetime with 749 career hits.
- January 25 – Charlene Barnett, 50, who played second base in the All-American Girls Professional Baseball League from 1949 to 1952 and was a member of three champion teams.
- January 26 – Nemo Gaines, 81, left-handed pitcher and U.S. Naval Academy graduate who threw 42/3 innings of shutout relief in four appearances for the Washington Senators in the midsummer of 1921; left baseball to return to active naval service, where he rose to the rank of captain and retired after World War II.
- January 29 – Andy Harrington, 75, minor league infielder between 1925 and 1942, who made one appearance in the majors, going hitless in one at bat as a pinch hitter for the Detroit Tigers on April 18, 1925.

=== February ===
- February 1 – Milt Byrnes, 62, outfielder in 390 career games for 1943–1945 St. Louis Browns; member of 1944 American League champions, the only St. Louis-based team to conquer the Junior Circuit.
- February 7 – Warren Giles, 82, Hall of Fame baseball executive; president of the National League from 1951 to 1969; previously, general manager and club president of the Cincinnati Reds between 1937 and 1951; father of longtime executive Bill Giles.
- February 8:
  - Alex Gaston, 85, catcher for the New York Giants (1920–1923) and Boston Red Sox (1926 and 1929) who got into 215 major-league games; brother of pitcher Milt Gaston, whose no-hitter Alex broke up with a seventh-inning single on September 12, 1926.
  - Art Williams, 44, the first black umpire in the National League, working from 1972 to 1977 including the 1975 NLCS.
- February 12:
  - Ernest Duff, 79, outfielder who batted .341 lifetime for five Negro National League teams between 1925 and 1928.
  - Bill Vargus, 79, southpaw hurler for 1925–1926 Boston Braves, appearing in 15 games.
- February 26 – Forrest Thompson, 60, left-handed pitcher who worked in 55 career games for the Washington Senators (1948–1949).

=== March ===
- March 2 – Dale Alexander, 75, first baseman who batted .331 in five seasons with the Tigers and Red Sox, winning the 1932 batting title, before an injury ended his career; later a longtime scout.
- March 6 – Link Wasem, 68, catcher who appeared in two games for the Boston Bees in May 1937.
- March 12 – Vernon Riddick, 62, infielder for the 1939 and 1941 Newark Eagles of the Negro National League.
- March 13 – Bill Steen, 91, pitcher who appeared in 108 games for the Cleveland Naps/Indians and Detroit Tigers from 1912 to 1915.
- March 18 – Percy Jones, 79, left-handed pitcher who appeared in 251 games for the Chicago Cubs (1920–1922, 1925–1928), Boston Braves (1929) and Pittsburgh Pirates (1930).
- March 19 – Jack Matchett, 71, member of the Kansas City Monarchs' "Big Four" starting rotation between 1940 and 1945; led 1940 Negro American League pitchers in games won (six).
- March 23:
  - Don Osborn, 70, longtime minor league pitcher and manager who served three terms as pitching coach of the Pittsburgh Pirates between 1963 and 1976; member of 1971 World Series champions.
  - Wilson Redus, 74, All-Star outfielder who played in the Negro leagues between 1924 and 1940, principally for the St. Louis Stars and Chicago American Giants.
- March 26 – Louis Dula, 67, pitcher/outfielder for the Homestead Grays of the Negro National League between 1933 and 1938; went 12–9 (3.62 ERA) in 37 games pitched and batted .314 with 32 hits at the plate.
- March 29 – Luke Easter, 63, first baseman in the Negro leagues, then with Cleveland Indians (1949–1954); slugged 86 home runs with 307 RBI over his first three full American League seasons (1950–1952); spent one season, 1969, as Cleveland's hitting coach.
- March 31 – Bob Schultz, 55, left-handed pitcher who worked in 65 games over four big-league campaigns with the Chicago Cubs (1951–1953), Pittsburgh Pirates (1953) and Detroit Tigers (1955).

=== April ===
- April 3 – Harry Simpson, 53, outfielder and first baseman who led the AL in triples twice during his eight-year career with five clubs between 1951 and 1959.
- April 6:
  - Al Evans, 62, catcher in 704 games in a dozen MLB seasons, 11 of them for the Washington Senators (1939–1942 and 1944–1950); later a minor league manager.
  - Rudy Kallio, 86, pitcher who hurled in 49 contests for the Detroit Tigers (1918–19) and Boston Red Sox (1925); later a coach for Triple-A Portland Beavers and scout for the Chicago Cubs.
- April 11 – Eddie Wilson, 69, outfielder who was hitting .347 in 52 games as a rookie for 1936 Brooklyn Dodgers when his skull was fractured by a beanball, August 26; returned to Dodgers in 1937 but only played in 36 more games, and spent the rest of his 13-year career in the minors, retiring in 1941.
- April 12 – Sam Edmonston, 95, Washington Senators pitcher who logged three innings in his only big-league game, on June 24, 1907, against Philadelphia; at his death, the oldest living former MLB player.
- April 13 – Frankie Kelleher, 62, outfielder in 47 games for 1942–1943 Cincinnati Reds; became mainstay of the minor-league Hollywood Stars, playing ten seasons for them (1944 and 1946–1954) and earning a spot in the Pacific Coast League Hall of Fame.
- April 18 – Lindsay Deal, 67, pinch hitter and outfielder who made it into four games for the 1939 Brooklyn Dodgers.
- April 21 – Cliff Bolton, 72, lefty-swinging catcher and pinch hitter for the Washington Senators (1931, 1933–1936 and 1941) and Detroit Tigers (1937); batted .410 in a part-time role for 1933 American League champions (.429 as a pinch hitter) and .291 lifetime with 280 hits in 335 career MLB games.
- April 24 – Fred Koster, 73, outfielder and pinch hitter who played in 76 games for the 1931 Philadelphia Phillies.
- April 27 – Jim Mooney, 72, left-handed hurler who worked in 92 games for the New York Giants and St. Louis Cardinals from 1931 to 1934; member of 1934 World Series champion "Gashouse Gang" Cardinals; longtime college baseball coach.
- April 29 – John Allyn, 61, Chicago business executive involved in ownership of the White Sox from 1961 until his death; co-owner (with his brother Arthur Jr.) from 1961 to 1969, owner and club president from 1969 to 1975, and minority owner and member of Bill Veeck's syndicate since 1975.
- April 30 – Wally Kopf, 79, third baseman and second baseman who appeared in two career games for 1921 New York Giants; brother of Larry Kopf.

=== May ===
- May 3 – Tom Jenkins, 81, outfielder who appeared in 171 total games for the Boston Red Sox, Philadelphia Athletics and St. Louis Browns over six seasons between 1925 and 1932.
- May 5:
  - Virgil Cheeves, 78, pitcher who worked in 111 MLB games for 1920–1923 Chicago Cubs, 1924 Cleveland Indians and 1927 New York Giants.
  - Bill Lucas, 43, general manager of the Atlanta Braves since September 1976 and the first African-American general manager in MLB history; previously, a player and executive in the Braves' organization since 1957.
- May 6:
  - Al "Ace" Elliott, 81, first baseman in 63 total games for 1923–1924 Chicago Cubs.
  - Red Hale, 65, shortstop for the 1937 Detroit Stars and 1939 Chicago American Giants of the Negro American League.
  - Charlie Ripple, 56, left-handed pitcher who worked in 11 games in three brief stints with the 1944–1946 Philadelphia Phillies.
  - Bunny Roser, 77, outfielder in 32 games for the 1922 Boston Braves.
- May 7:
  - Johnny Berger, 77, catcher who appeared in 11 MLB games for the 1922 Philadelphia Athletics and 1927 Washington Senators.
  - Marty McHale, 92, pitcher for the Boston Red Sox, New York Yankees and Cleveland Indians between 1910 and 1916, working in 64 career games; appeared on the vaudeville stage during off-seasons.
- May 9 – Charlie Hargreaves, 82, catcher in 423 games for the Brooklyn Robins and Pittsburgh Pirates between 1923 and 1930.
- May 12 – Clyde Kluttz, 61, catcher, scout and executive; appeared in 656 MLB games for six clubs (1942–1948 and 1951–1952); scouted for Kansas City Athletics (signing teenaged pitcher Catfish Hunter) and New York Yankees; then, during his term as Yankees' director of scouting/player development, he helped recruit free agent Hunter to the Bombers after the 1974 season; moved to Baltimore Orioles as vice president/player development, serving from 1976 until his death.
- May 18 – Ray Blades, 82, left fielder, manager, coach and scout; batted .301 in 767 career games for the St. Louis Cardinals between 1922 and 1932; played on four NL pennant-winners and 1926 and 1931 World Series champions; managed Redbirds from 1939 to June 6, 1940; coached for Cardinals, Cincinnati Reds, Brooklyn Dodgers and Chicago Cubs for a dozen seasons between 1930 and 1956.
- May 23:
  - Bob Chesnes, 58, pitcher in 61 games for 1948–1950 Pittsburgh Pirates; his sparkling 14–6 rookie campaign helped lead 1948 Bucs to a surprising first-division finish.
  - Hiroshi Oshita, 56, Hall of Fame first baseman who played for the Toei Flyers from 1946 to 1951 and the Nishitetsu Lions from 1952 to 1959.
- May 29 – Sig Jakucki, 69, hot-tempered pitcher for St. Louis Browns (1936 and 1944–1945) who hurled a complete-game victory on October 1, 1944, to seal the only American League pennant the St. Louis entry ever won; lost his only decision in 1944 World Series; known for alcoholism and brawling, he was kicked off the 1945 Browns on September 1 and never returned to the major leagues.
- May 30 – Joe Smaza, 55, outfielder who played two games for the Chicago White Sox in September 1946.

=== June ===
- June 8 – Muriel Coben, 58, All-American Girls Professional Baseball League pitcher, and member of a Canadian women's curling champion team.
- June 11 – Fred Martin, 63, pitcher for the St. Louis Cardinals (1946, 1949–1950) who appeared in 57 career games, his MLB career interrupted by his suspension for "jumping" to the Mexican League in May 1946; later a minor league manager and pitching instructor for the Chicago Cubs, where he taught the split-finger fastball to eventual Hall of Famer Bruce Sutter; was pitching coach of the Chicago White Sox at the time of his passing.
- June 12 – Bill Brenzel, 69, catcher who appeared in nine games for 1932 Pittsburgh Pirates and 67 contests for 1934–1935 Cleveland Indians; later, a scout for the St. Louis Cardinals from 1948 to 1950 and the Brooklyn and Los Angeles Dodgers from 1951 until his death.
- June 17 – Duffy Lewis, 91, left fielder for the Boston Red Sox from 1910 to 1917 who starred on three champions (1912, 1915, 1916) and mastered Fenway Park's sloping left field; also played for Yankees and Senators between 1919 and 1921; longtime traveling secretary of the Boston/Milwaukee Braves.
- June 18 – Hal Trosky, 66, slugging first baseman for the Cleveland Indians between 1933 and 1941 whose career was shortened by persistent migraine headaches; led American League in runs batted in 1936 with 162; batted .302 lifetime with 228 home runs and six 100-RBI seasons; his son briefly pitched in majors.
- June 27 – Pat Maloney, 91, outfielder who played in 25 games for 1912 New York Highlanders.
- June 29:
  - Johnny Bassler, 84, good-hitting catcher who appeared in 44 games for the 1913–1914 Cleveland Naps and 767 contests for the 1921–1927 Detroit Tigers, batting .304 lifetime in 2,319 at bats; coached with Cleveland and the St. Louis Browns between 1938 and 1941; also batted .318 with 1,379 hits in 1,567 minor-league games.
  - Steamboat Williams, 87, pitcher who worked in 36 career games for 1914 and 1916 St. Louis Cardinals.

=== July ===
- July 2 – Ed Stauffer, 81, pitcher in 21 total games for 1923 Chicago Cubs and 1925 St. Louis Browns.
- July 12 – Tom Lovelace, 81, pinch hit in one game with the Pittsburgh Pirates in 1922.
- July 15:
  - Garrell Hartman, 66, outfielder for the 1944 Philadelphia Stars of the Negro National League.
  - John Holland, 69, longtime baseball executive; general manager of the Chicago Cubs from 1957 through 1975.
- July 22 – Amos Strunk, 90, center fielder for the Philadelphia Athletics, Boston Red Sox and Chicago White Sox between 1908 and 1924; appeared in 1,512 games and was a member of four World Series champion teams (1910, 1911, 1913, 1918).
- July 23 – Lefty West, 63, pitcher who appeared in 35 games for 1944–1945 St. Louis Browns.
- July 25 – Jimmy Binder, 76, third baseman, listed as 5 feet 5 inches (1.65 m) tall and 132 pounds (60 kg), for five Negro leagues clubs over seven years between 1930 and 1937.
- July 26 – Bill DeKoning, 60, catcher who played in three games (and was hitless in his lone at bat) for 1945 New York Giants.

=== August ===
- August 2 – Thurman Munson, 32, captain and seven-time All-Star catcher for the New York Yankees; claimed starting job in September 1969 and held it until his death in the crash of his private jet; 1970 AL Rookie of the Year, 1976 Most Valuable Player, and three-time Gold Glove winner; batted .300 five times (.292 overall in 1,423 regular-season games), and .357 in 30 postseason games; two-time (1977 and 1978) World Series champion whose #15 uniform was retired upon his death.
- August 7 – Hal Wagner, 64, catcher who played 672 career games for Philadelphia Athletics (1937–1944), Boston Red Sox (1944–1947), Detroit Tigers (1947–1948) and Philadelphia Phillies (1948–1949); two-time American League All-Star.
- August 9 – Walter O'Malley, 75, principal owner (1950–1975), then sole owner (1975 until his death), of the Dodgers who moved the team from Brooklyn to Los Angeles (1958) and constructed Dodger Stadium (opened 1962); a lawyer, he became an investor in the franchise during World War II (1944–1945), then one of four equal partners (1945–1950); during his ownership, the Dodgers won four World Series titles (1955, 1959, 1963, 1965) and led MLB in attendance 13 times between 1959 and 1978; although vilified in his native New York City, perhaps the most powerful owner of his time, and was named to the Baseball Hall of Fame in 2008, a half-century after moving his club to Los Angeles.
- August 14 – Mack Wheat, 86, weak-hitting backup catcher for Brooklyn Robins (1915–1919) and Philadelphia Phillies (1920–1921), playing in 225 total games; brother of Hall of Famer Zach Wheat.
- August 17 – Bill Grieve, 83, American League umpire from 1938 to 1955; worked 2,785 league games, three World Series and two All-Star contests.
- August 26 – Dizzy Sutherland, 57, left-handed hurler given a one-game audition with Washington Senators, September 20, 1949; starting against St. Louis, he walked six of the 11 batters he faced and surrendered five earned runs in one full inning pitched, to be tagged with Washington's 15–6 defeat.
- August 28 – Paul Hardy, 68, catcher who played for multiple Negro leagues teams during the 1930s and 1940s, including the Kansas City Monarchs.

=== September ===
- September 1 – Buck Ewing, 76, standout catcher of the 1920s and 1930s for Negro leagues and black barnstorming teams, most notably the Homestead Grays.
- September 4 – Turkey Stearnes, 78, center fielder in the Negro leagues who led the Negro National League in home runs six times while batting .350.
- September 7 – Percy Wilson, 80, first baseman for the Negro leagues' Milwaukee Bears and Baltimore Black Sox in 1923–1924.
- September 8 – Rick Joseph, 40, third baseman and first baseman who appeared in 270 career games for the 1964 Kansas City Athletics and 1967–1970 Philadelphia Phillies.
- September 16 – Charlie Deal, 87, third baseman who played 851 games for five MLB teams (including his Federal League service); started all four games of the 1914 World Series for the "Miracle" world-champion Boston Braves who was the last surviving member of that team; also the starter in the "hot corner" for the 1918 NL champion Chicago Cubs.
- September 18:
  - Gene Kelly, 60, sportscaster; Philadelphia Phillies' play-by-play announcer from 1950 to 1959, later working with Waite Hoyt on Cincinnati Reds' crew in 1962 and 1963.
  - Isaac Lane, 90, third baseman and Wilberforce University graduate who played for the Dayton Marcos, Columbus Buckeyes and Detroit Stars of the Negro National League from 1920 to 1922.
- September 22 – Chuffie Alexander, 87, outfielder/infielder in black baseball between 1925 and 1932, including two years of service with the 1927–1928 Birmingham Black Barons of the Negro National League.

=== October ===
- October 4 – Fred Graf, 90, third baseman who had a 16-year career in the minor leagues, interrupted by a four-game trial with the 1913 St. Louis Browns.
- October 11 – Abe Bowman, 86, pitcher who worked in 24 games for the Cleveland Naps/Indians in 1914 and 1915.
- October 20 – Cy Slapnicka, 93, pitcher, scout and executive who spent 60 years in baseball; appeared in only ten total MLB games for 1911 Chicago Cubs and 1918 Pittsburgh Pirates, but became one of the most celebrated scouts of his day working for the Cleveland Indians; signed Hall of Famers Lou Boudreau, fellow Iowan Bob Feller and Bob Lemon among many other stars; general manager of the Indians from 1935 to 1940.
- October 22 – John Drebinger, 88, sportswriter for The New York Times for 41 years.
- October 25 – Morrie Schick, 87, outfielder and pinch hitter who got into 14 games for 1917 Chicago Cubs.
- October 29 – Mel Ingram, 75, whose entire pro baseball career consisted of three major-league games as a pinch runner for 1929 Pittsburgh Pirates; he scored one run.
- October – Anthony Cooper, 75, shortstop/outfielder who played for ten Negro leagues teams over ten seasons spanning 1928 to 1941.

=== November ===
- November 4:
  - Johnny Priest, 88, infielder who played ten total games in stints for the 1911–1912 New York Highlanders.
  - Lancelot "Yank" Terry, 68, pitcher who—despite his nickname—spent his entire MLB career with Boston Red Sox, appearing in 93 games over five seasons (1940 and 1942–1945).
- November 15:
  - Ken Ash, 78, pitcher who appeared in two games for the 1925 Chicago White Sox and 53 contests for the 1928–1930 Cincinnati Reds.
  - Ed Klieman, 61, pitcher who worked in 222 games for the Cleveland Indians, Washington Senators, White Sox and Philadelphia Athletics between 1943 and 1950; led AL in saves (17) in 1947.
- November 16:
  - Jack Butterfield, 50, vice president/player development and scouting of the New York Yankees and former head baseball coach of the University of Maine (1957–1974) and the University of South Florida (1975–1976); father of Brian Butterfield.
  - Cliff Carter, 79, pitcher who appeared in the Negro leagues for six teams between 1923 and 1934; led 1927 Eastern Colored League in complete games (18).
  - Joseph Iglehart, 88, investment banker, CBS stockholder and board member, and baseball club owner; joined Baltimore Orioles' ownership group in autumn of 1953, when the team moved from St. Louis; became largest shareholder and served as board chairman from 1955 to 1964; sold his Orioles' stock to Jerold Hoffberger when CBS purchased the Yankees in 1964, then joined Yanks' board of directors, serving until CBS sold the Bombers to George Steinbrenner's syndicate in 1973; continued as limited partner in Steinbrenner's group until selling his interest in 1977.
- November 18 – Freddie Fitzsimmons, 78, knuckleball pitcher who won 217 games for the New York Giants and Brooklyn Dodgers; manager of Philadelphia Phillies from July 28, 1943, to June 29, 1945; later, a longtime coach associated with manager Leo Durocher.
- November 25 – Elbert Andrews, 77, relief pitcher who took part in six games for the 1925 Philadelphia Athletics.
- November 28 – Herb Bremer, 66, second-string catcher who appeared in 70 games for the St. Louis Cardinals between 1937 and 1939.

=== December ===
- December 2 – Sam Dailey, 75, who posted a 2–2 (7.54 ERA) record in 20 games for the 1929 Philadelphia Phillies in his lone MLB season.
- December 4:
  - Bert Delmas, 68, infielder who played 12 games for the 1933 Brooklyn Dodgers.
  - Pedro Dibut, 87, pitcher who played with the Cuban Stars West of the Negro National League in 1923 and the Cincinnati Reds of the National League in 1924–1925, appearing in 26 total contests.
- December 8 – Del Young, 67, shortstop and second baseman who appeared in 309 games for the 1937–1940 Philadelphia Phillies.
- December 12 – Nick Dumovich, 77, left-hander who pitched in 28 games for 1923 Chicago Cubs.
- December 14:
  - Willie Nixon, 63, outfielder for the Birmingham Black Barons, Newark Eagles and Jacksonville Red Caps of the Negro leagues in 1940 and 1941.
  - Vinnie Smith, 64, MLB catcher and umpire; appeared in 16 total games for Pittsburgh Pirates (1941 and 1946), then umpired in the National League from 1957 through 1965; officiated for the two All-Star Games played in 1960, and the 1964 World Series.
- December 15 – Stan Hack, 70, five-time All-Star third baseman for the Chicago Cubs who batted .301 lifetime and posted a .394 career on-base percentage, the highest of any 20th-century third baseman; scored 100 runs seven times and led NL in hits and steals twice each; as Cubs' manager (1954–1956) and interim skipper of St. Louis Cardinals (September 17 through end of 1958 season), compiled a 199–272 record.
- December 19 – Bud Sketchley, 60, Canadian-born outfielder and pinch hitter who played 13 games for the 1942 Cleveland Indians.
- December 28:
  - Hank Butcher, 93, who appeared in 64 games as an outfielder and pinch hitter for the 1911–1912 Cleveland Naps.
  - Jim Mosolf, 74, pinch hitter and backup outfielder who played in 118 games for the 1929–1931 Pittsburgh Pirates and 1933 Chicago Cubs.
- December 29 – Ed Albrecht, 50, pitcher and minor-league phenom who appeared in three total games for 1949–1950 St. Louis Browns; won 29 games (losing 12) with 389 strikeouts in 1949 for Pine Bluff of the Class C Cotton States League; called up by Browns in September, he threw a five-inning, one-hit victory against the White Sox on October 2 for his only MLB triumph (the game, although "official" because it lasted five full innings, was halted because of darkness and a Sunday curfew).
- December – Obie Lackey, 76, infielder who played in the Negro leagues and former black barnstorming teams between 1929 and 1945.
