= Anthony Murray =

Anthony or Tony Murray may refer to:

- Anthony Murray (New Zealand rugby league) (1958/9–2006), New Zealand rugby league player and coach
- Anthony Murray (rugby league, born 1977), English rugby league coach and player
- Anthony Murray, a character on the TV show Brookside between 2000 and 2003
- Tony Murray (businessman) (1920–2023), French-born British billionaire businessman
- Tony Murray (baseball) (1904–1974), outfielder in Major League Baseball
- Tony Murray (jockey) (1950–1992), English jockey
- Tony Murray (judge) (1917–1999), judge of the Supreme Court of Victoria
