= Phil Collins (baseball) =

American baseball player (1901–1948)

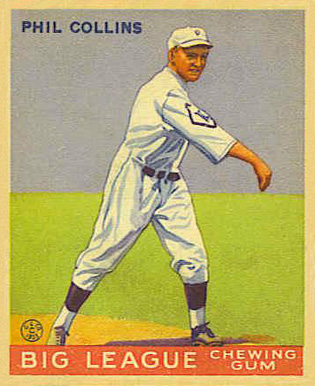
- Pitcher
- Born: August 27, 1901; Chicago, Illinois, U.S.
- Died: August 14, 1948 (aged 46); Chicago, Illinois, U.S.
- Batted: Right Threw: Right

MLB debut
- October 7, 1923, for the Chicago Cubs

Last MLB appearance
- September 23, 1935, for the St. Louis Cardinals

MLB statistics
- Win–loss record: 80–85
- Earned run average: 4.66
- Strikeouts: 423
- Stats at Baseball Reference

Teams
- Chicago Cubs (1923); Philadelphia Phillies (1929–1935); St. Louis Cardinals (1935)

Philip Eugene Collins (August 27, 1901 – August 14, 1948) was an American professional baseball player. He was a right-handed pitcher over parts of eight seasons (1923, 1929–1935) with the Chicago Cubs, Philadelphia Phillies and St. Louis Cardinals. For his career, he compiled an 80–85 record in 292 appearances, most as a relief pitcher, with a 4.66 earned run average and 423 strikeouts.

As a hitter, Collins posted a .193 batting average (93-for-482) with 45 runs, 4 home runs and 44 RBI. He was used as a pinch hitter 13 times in his major league career.

Collins was born and later died in Chicago of cancer at the age of 46. He was in baseball known as "Fidgety Phil", which was also inscribed on his gravestone at Holy Cross Cemetery and Mausoleums in Calumet City, Cook County, Illinois.

== See also ==
- List of Major League Baseball annual saves leaders
