= Pete Turgeon =

American baseball player (1897–1977)

- Shortstop
- Born: January 3, 1897; Minneapolis, Minnesota
- Died: January 24, 1977 (aged 80); Wichita Falls, Texas
- Batted: Right Threw: Right

MLB debut
- September 20, 1923, for the Chicago Cubs

Last MLB appearance
- October 7, 1923, for the Chicago Cubs

MLB statistics
- Games played: 3
- At bats: 6
- Hits: 1
- Stats at Baseball Reference

Teams
- Chicago Cubs (1923)

Eugene Joseph "Pete" Turgeon (January 3, 1897 – January 24, 1977) was a shortstop in Major League Baseball. He played for the Chicago Cubs.
