= Buck Ewing (1920s catcher) =

American baseball player (1903-1979)

- Catcher
- Born: January 31, 1903; Massillon, Ohio, U.S.
- Died: September 1, 1979 (aged 76); Schenectady, New York, U.S.
- Batted: Left Threw: Right

Negro league baseball debut
- 1920, for the Chicago American Giants

Last appearance
- 1930, for the Homestead Grays
- Stats at Baseball Reference

Teams
- Chicago American Giants (1920); Columbus Buckeyes (1921); Cleveland Tate Stars (1921); Homestead Grays (1928–1930)

William Monroe Ewing (January 31, 1903 – September 1, 1979), nicknamed "Buck", was an American Negro league catcher between 1920 and 1930.

A native of Massillon, Ohio, Ewing made his Negro leagues debut in 1920 with the Chicago American Giants. He went on to play for the Columbus Buckeyes and Cleveland Tate Stars, and finished his career with a three-year stint with the Homestead Grays from 1928 to 1930. Ewing died in Schenectady, New York in 1979 at age 76.

Pittsburgh Pirates pitcher Bud Culloton said Ewing was "heads and shoulders over any catcher in independent baseball in his time." He further said it was "a baseball tragedy that this man didn't have an opportunity to play in the majors."
