= Tony Murray (baseball) =

American baseball player (1904–1974)

- Outfielder
- Born: April 30, 1904; Chicago, Illinois
- Died: March 19, 1974 (aged 69); Chicago, Illinois
- Batted: Right Threw: Right

MLB debut
- October 6, 1923, for the Chicago Cubs

Last MLB appearance
- October 7, 1923, for the Chicago Cubs

MLB statistics
- Games played: 2
- At bats: 4
- Hits: 1
- Stats at Baseball Reference

Teams
- Chicago Cubs (1923)

Anthony Joseph Murray (April 30, 1904 – March 19, 1974) was an outfielder in Major League Baseball. He played in two games for the Chicago Cubs.
