= Nick Dumovich =

American baseball player (1902–1979)

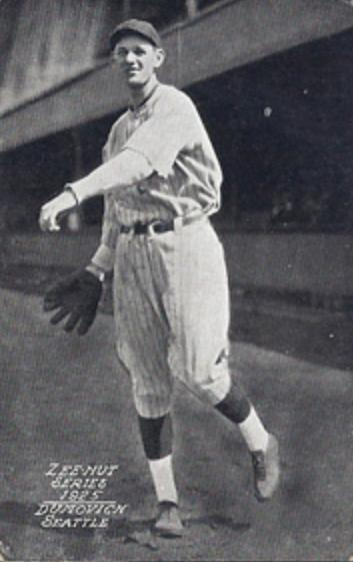

Chicago Cubs
- Pitcher
- Born: January 2, 1902; Sacramento, California
- Died: December 12, 1979 (aged 77); Laguna Hills, California
- Batted: Left Threw: Left

MLB debut
- April 20, 1923, for the Chicago Cubs

Last MLB appearance
- October 7, 1923, for the Chicago Cubs

MLB statistics (through 1923)
- Win–loss record: 3–5
- Earned run average: 4.60
- Strikeouts: 23
- WHIP: 1.734
- Stats at Baseball Reference

Teams
- Chicago Cubs (1923)

Nicholas Dumovich (January 2, 1902 – December 12, 1979) was a pitcher in Major League Baseball.

== Career ==
He was born in Sacramento, California. He pitched in 28 games for the Chicago Cubs during the 1923 Chicago Cubs season. He died in Laguna Hills, California.
