= Louis Dula =

American baseball player

- Pitcher
- Born: March 23, 1912; Cincinnati, Ohio
- Died: March 26, 1979 (aged 67); Cincinnati, Ohio
- Batted: Right Threw: Right

Negro league baseball debut
- 1933, for the Homestead Grays

Last appearance
- 1939, for the Homestead Grays
- Stats at Baseball Reference

Teams
- Homestead Grays (1933–1939)

Louis Frank Dula (March 23, 1912 – March 26, 1979) was a Negro leagues pitcher, mostly for the Homestead Grays.
