= Ed Stauffer =

American baseball player (1898–1979)

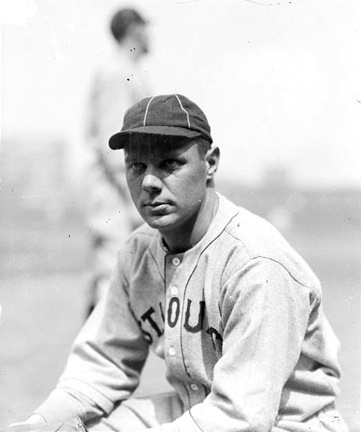
- Stauffer in 1925
- Pitcher
- Born: January 10, 1898; Emsworth, Pennsylvania, US
- Died: July 2, 1979 (aged 81); St. Petersburg, Florida, US
- Batted: Right Threw: Right

MLB debut
- April 26, 1923, for the Chicago Cubs

Last MLB appearance
- October 4, 1925, for the St. Louis Browns

MLB statistics
- Win–loss record: 0–1
- Earned run average: 5.85
- Strikeouts: 13
- Stats at Baseball Reference

Teams
- Chicago Cubs (1923); St. Louis Browns (1925)

Charles Edward Stauffer (January 10, 1898 – July 2, 1979) was an American Major League Baseball pitcher. Stauffer played for the Chicago Cubs in 1923 and the St. Louis Browns in 1925.
