= Franklyn Gracesqui =

Dominican baseball player (born 1979)

- Pitcher
- Born: August 20, 1979 (age 45); Santo Domingo, Dominican Republic
- Batted: Switch Threw: Left

Professional debut
- MLB: April 29, 2004, for the Florida Marlins
- NPB: March 30, 2007, for the Chunichi Dragons

Last appearance
- MLB: May 11, 2004, for the Florida Marlins
- NPB: June 30, 2007, for the Chunichi Dragons

MLB statistics
- Win–loss record: 0–1
- Earned run average: 11.25
- Strikeouts: 1

NPB statistics
- Win–loss record: 3–0
- Earned run average: 2.35
- Strikeouts: 13
- Stats at Baseball Reference

Teams
- Florida Marlins (2004); Chunichi Dragons (2007)

Franklyn Benjamin Gracesqui (born August 20, 1979) is a Dominican former left-handed professional baseball pitcher. He played in Major League Baseball for the Florida Marlins during the 2004 season.

Gracesqui was drafted in the 21st round of the 1998 Major League Baseball draft by the Toronto Blue Jays. On December 16, 2002, he was claimed by the Florida Marlins in the Rule 5 Draft and made his major league debut in 2004 with the Marlins, pitching in 7 games. Gracesqui became a free agent after the 2005 season and signed a minor league contract with the Baltimore Orioles. Being granted free agency at the end of 2006, Gracesqui signed with the Chunichi Dragons in Japan for the 2007 season. In 17 relief appearances, Gracesqui had a 3–0 record and an ERA of 2.35. He became a free agent at the end of the season. Gracesqui pitched for the York Revolution and Laredo Broncos in 2010. He reported to spring training with the Yuma Scorpions on May 14, 2011. He played briefly for the Bridgeport Bluefish of the Atlantic League of Professional Baseball in 2012, but was released.
