= Red Hale =

American baseball player

- Shortstop
- Threw: Right

Negro league baseball debut
- 1937, for the Detroit Stars

Last appearance
- 1939, for the Chicago American Giants
- Stats at Baseball Reference

Teams
- Detroit Stars (1937); Chicago American Giants (1939)

E. "Red" Hale is an American former Negro league shortstop who played in the 1930s.

Hale made his Negro leagues debut in 1937 with the Detroit Stars and played for the Chicago American Giants in 1939. In 28 recorded career games, he posted 25 hits with three home runs in 108 plate appearances.
