= Garrell Hartman =

American baseball player

- Outfielder
- Born: May 20, 1913; Lexington, North Carolina, U.S.
- Died: July 15, 1979 (aged 66); Winston-Salem, North Carolina, U.S.
- Batted: Right Threw: Right

Negro league baseball debut
- 1944, for the Philadelphia Stars

Last appearance
- 1944, for the Philadelphia Stars
- Stats at Baseball Reference

Teams
- Philadelphia Stars (1944)

Garrell Vernell Hartman (May 20, 1913 – July 15, 1979) was an American Negro league outfielder in the 1940s.

A native of Lexington, North Carolina, Hartman played for the Philadelphia Stars in 1944. In his 19 recorded games, he posted eight hits in 32 plate appearances. Hartman died in Winston-Salem, North Carolina in 1979 at age 66.
