= 1982 Philadelphia Phillies season =

1982 Philadelphia Phillies
- League: National League
- Division: East
- Ballpark: Veterans Stadium
- City: Philadelphia
- Owners: Bill Giles
- General managers: Paul Owens
- Managers: Pat Corrales
- Television: WPHL-TV; PRISM
- Radio: WCAU (Harry Kalas, Richie Ashburn, Andy Musser, Chris Wheeler. Tim McCarver)

The 1982 season was the 100th season in Philadelphia Phillies franchise history. During the season, Steve Carlton became the last pitcher to win at least twenty games in one season for the Phillies in the 20th century. Carlton also became the first pitcher to win four Cy Young Awards in a career.

The 1982 Phillies finished the season with an 89–73 record, placing the team in second place in the National League East, three games behind the World Series champions, St. Louis Cardinals.

== Offseason ==
- November 20, 1981: Bo Diaz was traded by the Indians to the Philadelphia Phillies as part of a three-team trade. The Phillies sent a player to be named later to the Indians. The St. Louis Cardinals sent Lary Sorensen and Silvio Martinez to the Indians. The Phillies sent Lonnie Smith to the Cardinals.
- December 6, 1981: Bob Boone was purchased from the Phillies by the California Angels.
- December 8, 1981: Dickie Noles, Dan Larson and Keith Moreland were traded by the Phillies to the Chicago Cubs for Mike Krukow and cash.
- December 9, 1981: the Philadelphia Phillies sent Scott Munninghoff (minors) to the Cleveland Indians complete the November 20, 1981 trade.
- January 27, 1982: Larry Bowa and Ryne Sandberg were traded by the Phillies to the Chicago Cubs for Iván DeJesús.
- February 16, 1982: Bake McBride was traded by the Phillies to the Cleveland Indians for Sid Monge.

== Regular season ==
- July 19, 1982: Tony Gwynn made his major league debut for the San Diego Padres against the Phillies. In a 7–6 Phillies road victory, Gwynn had four at-bats. Gwynn gets two hits, one run, and one RBI.

=== Season standings ===
NL East
Team	W	L	Pct.	GB	Home	Road
St. Louis Cardinals	92	70	.568	—	46‍–‍35	46‍–‍35
Philadelphia Phillies	89	73	.549	3	51‍–‍30	38‍–‍43
Montreal Expos	86	76	.531	6	40‍–‍41	46‍–‍35
Pittsburgh Pirates	84	78	.519	8	42‍–‍39	42‍–‍39
Chicago Cubs	73	89	.451	19	38‍–‍43	35‍–‍46
New York Mets	65	97	.401	27	33‍–‍48	32‍–‍49

=== Record vs. opponents ===
1982 National League record Sources:
Team	ATL	CHC	CIN	HOU	LAD	MON	NYM	PHI	PIT	SD	SF	STL
Atlanta	—	8–4	14–4	10–8	7–11	5–7	9–3	6–6	4–8	11–7	8–10	7–5
Chicago	4–8	—	6–6	9–3	5–7	6–12	9–9	9–9	9–9	4–8	6–6	6–12
Cincinnati	4–14	6–6	—	7–11	7–11	4–8	7–5	5–7	4–8	6–12	6–12	5–7
Houston	8–10	3–9	11–7	—	7–11	4–8	8–4	7–5	9–3	9–9	5–13	6–6
Los Angeles	11–7	7–5	11–7	11–7	—	8–4	6–6	4–8	5–7	9–9	9–9	7–5
Montreal	7–5	12–6	8–4	8–4	4–8	—	11–7	8–10	7–11	7–5	4–8	10–8
New York	3–9	9–9	5–7	4–8	6–6	7–11	—	7–11	8–10	6–6	4–8	6–12
Philadelphia	6-6	9–9	7–5	5–7	8–4	10–8	11–7	—	9–9	7–5	10–2	7–11
Pittsburgh	8–4	9–9	8–4	3–9	7–5	11–7	10–8	9–9	—	6–6	6–6	7–11
San Diego	7–11	8–4	12–6	9–9	9–9	5–7	6–6	5–7	6–6	—	10–8	4–8
San Francisco	10–8	6–6	12–6	13–5	9–9	8–4	8–4	2–10	6–6	8–10	—	5–7
St. Louis	5–7	12–6	7–5	6–6	5–7	8–10	12–6	11–7	11–7	8–4	7–5	—

=== Notable transactions ===
- April 13, 1982: Tim Corcoran was signed as a free agent by the Phillies.
- May 14, 1982: Rowland Office was signed as a free agent by the Phillies.
- June 7, 1982: Bruce Ruffin was drafted by the Phillies in the 31st round of the 1982 Major League Baseball draft, but did not sign.
- June 8, 1982: Del Unser was released by the Phillies.
- June 15, 1982: Dick Davis was traded by the Phillies to the Toronto Blue Jays for Wayne Nordhagen.
- June 15, 1982: Wayne Nordhagen was traded by the Phillies to the Pittsburgh Pirates for Bill Robinson.
- August 10, 1982: Willie Montañez was signed as a free agent by the Phillies.
- August 21, 1982: Sparky Lyle was purchased from the Phillies by the Chicago White Sox.
- September 12, 1982: Jerry Reed, Wil Culmer, and Roy Smith were traded by the Phillies to the Cleveland Indians for John Denny.

=== 1982 Game Log ===
Legend
	Phillies win
	Phillies loss
	Postponement
**Bold**	Phillies team member

1982 Game Log
Overall Record: 89–73
April (6–13)

#	Date	Opponent	Score	Win	Loss	Save	Attendance	Record
–	April 5	Mets	Postponed (rain); Makeup: June 26 as a traditional double-header					
–	April 7	Mets	Postponed (rain); Makeup: June 25 as a traditional double-header					
1	April 8	Mets	2–7	Randy Jones (1–0)	**Steve Carlton** (0–1)	None	15,345	0–1
2	April 9	Expos	0–2	Steve Rogers (1–0)	**Larry Christenson** (0–1)	None	7,795	0–2
3	April 10	Expos	3–11	Bill Gullickson (1–0)	**Dick Ruthven** (0–1)	None	16,718	0–3
4	April 11	Expos	1–0	**Mike Krukow** (1–0)	Ray Burris (0–1)	None	15,397	1–3
5	April 13	@ Mets	2–5	Randy Jones (2–0)	**Steve Carlton** (0–2)	Neil Allen (2)	40,845	1–4
6	April 14	@ Mets	1–8	Mike Scott (1–1)	**Dick Ruthven** (0–2)	None	13,420	1–5
7	April 15	@ Mets	8–4 (13)	**Warren Brusstar** (1–0)	Charlie Puleo (0–1)	None	14,634	2–5
8	April 16	@ Cardinals	2–3	Bob Forsch (2–0)	**Mike Krukow** (1–1)	Bruce Sutter (3)	15,003	2–6
9	April 17	@ Cardinals	0–6	Joaquín Andújar (2–1)	**Steve Carlton** (0–3)	None	17,457	2–7
10	April 18	@ Cardinals	5–6 (11)	Dave LaPoint (1–0)	**Warren Brusstar** (1–1)	None	25,222	2–8
11	April 19	@ Expos	2–0	**Larry Christenson** (1–1)	Scott Sanderson (1–1)	**Ed Farmer** (1)	10,102	3–8
–	April 20	@ Expos	Postponed (rain); Makeup: August 12 as a traditional double-header					
12	April 21	@ Expos	2–5	Steve Rogers (2–1)	**Steve Carlton** (0–4)	Jeff Reardon (2)	6,448	3–9
13	April 23	Cardinals	2–9	Bob Forsch (3–0)	**Mike Krukow** (1–2)	None	26,617	3–10
14	April 24	Cardinals	4–7	Doug Bair (1–0)	**Ed Farmer** (0–1)	Bruce Sutter (6)	25,270	3–11
15	April 25	Cardinals	8–4	**Steve Carlton** (1–4)	Andy Rincon (1–1)	**Ed Farmer** (2)	30,198	4–11
16	April 27	@ Dodgers	0–3	Jerry Reuss (2–1)	**Larry Christenson** (1–2)	None	37,888	4–12
17	April 28	@ Dodgers	9–3	**Ed Farmer** (1–1)	Steve Howe (1–1)	None	38,665	5–12
18	April 29	@ Dodgers	0–4	Burt Hooton (1–1)	**Dick Ruthven** (0–3)	None	36,198	5–13
19	April 30	@ Padres	3–1 (10)	**Steve Carlton** (2–4)	Juan Eichelberger (2–3)	None	23,383	6–13

May (19–8)

#	Date	Opponent	Score	Win	Loss	Save	Attendance	Record
20	May 1	@ Padres	6–9	Luis DeLeón (2–0)	**Larry Christenson** (1–3)	None	39,785	6–14
21	May 2	@ Padres	3–0	**Mike Krukow** (2–2)	John Curtis (2–1)	None	44,227	7–14
22	May 3	@ Giants	5–3	**Sid Monge** (1–0)	Dan Schatzeder (0–4)	**Ed Farmer** (3)	12,022	8–14
23	May 4	@ Giants	9–4	**Steve Carlton** (3–4)	Rich Gale (1–2)	None	5,656	9–14
24	May 6	Padres	12–7	**Larry Christenson** (2–3)	Juan Eichelberger (2–4)	None	21,248	10–14
25	May 7	Padres	5–2	**Sparky Lyle** (1–0)	Gary Lucas (0–2)	None	26,113	11–14
26	May 8	Padres	5–1	**Dick Ruthven** (1–3)	John Montefusco (1–4)	None	24,270	12–14
27	May 9	Padres	0–6	Tim Lollar (4–0)	**Steve Carlton** (3–5)	None	36,593	12–15
28	May 10	Dodgers	9–8 (10)	**Warren Brusstar** (2–1)	Tom Niedenfuer (0–1)	None	25,269	13–15
29	May 11	Dodgers	9–8	**Porfi Altamirano** (1–0)	Jerry Reuss (4–2)	**Warren Brusstar** (1)	25,269	14–15
30	May 12	Dodgers	11–3	**Ron Reed** (1–0)	Bob Welch (4–2)	None	25,977	15–15
31	May 13	Giants	8–1	**Dick Ruthven** (2–3)	Alan Fowlkes (3–2)	None	23,053	16–15
32	May 14	Giants	2–0	**Steve Carlton** (4–5)	Rich Gale (1–3)	None	33,541	17–15
33	May 15	Giants	5–3	**Larry Christenson** (3–3)	Greg Minton (2–3)	**Sparky Lyle** (1)	29,785	18–15
34	May 16	Giants	6–1	**Mike Krukow** (3–2)	Atlee Hammaker (2–1)	None	38,125	19–15
35	May 17	Astros	1–8	Vern Ruhle (2–2)	**Ron Reed** (1–1)	None	23,734	19–16
36	May 18	Astros	1–2 (12)	Dave Smith (1–2)	**Ed Farmer** (1–2)	None	23,869	19–17
37	May 19	Astros	3–5	Bob Knepper (2–4)	**Steve Carlton** (4–6)	Dave Smith (6)	20,007	19–18
38	May 21	@ Braves	6–7	Steve Bedrosian (3–0)	**Sparky Lyle** (1–1)	None	28,050	19–19
39	May 22	@ Braves	5–2	**Mike Krukow** (4–2)	Larry McWilliams (2–2)	**Ed Farmer** (4)	25,925	20–19
40	May 23	@ Braves	2–1	**Dick Ruthven** (3–3)	Phil Niekro (2–1)	**Ed Farmer** (5)	27,965	21–19
41	May 24	@ Reds	9–1	**Steve Carlton** (5–6)	Tom Seaver (1–6)	None	17,110	22–19
42	May 25	@ Reds	3–4	Greg A. Harris (1–0)	**Ed Farmer** (1–3)	Tom Hume (9)	16,688	22–20
43	May 26	@ Reds	0–2	Mario Soto (4–4)	**Mike Krukow** (4–3)	None	14,091	22–21
–	May 28	Braves	Postponed (rain); Makeup: August 30 as a traditional double-header					
44	May 29	Braves	1–0	**Dick Ruthven** (4–3)	Phil Niekro (2–2)	None	26,790	23–21
45	May 30	Braves	6–2	**Steve Carlton** (6–6)	Rick Mahler (4–4)	None	35,662	24–21
46	May 31	Reds	5–4 (15)	**Sid Monge** (2–0)	Bob Shirley (2–3)	None	22,708	25–21

June (17–12)

#	Date	Opponent	Score	Win	Loss	Save	Attendance	Record
47	June 1	Reds	1–4 (7)	Greg A. Harris (2–0)	**Mike Krukow** (4–4)	None	20,102	25–22
48	June 2	Reds	4–2	**Dick Ruthven** (5–3)	Bruce Berenyi (4–5)	**Warren Brusstar** (2)	22,960	26–22
49	June 4	@ Astros	3–8	Vern Ruhle (3–3)	**Ed Farmer** (1–4)	None	23,362	26–23
50	June 5	@ Astros	5–3	**Sparky Lyle** (2–1)	Dave Smith (1–3)	None	35,315	27–23
51	June 6	@ Astros	6–7	Vern Ruhle (4–3)	**Warren Brusstar** (2–2)	None	21,374	27–24
52	June 7	Cubs	7–5	**Sid Monge** (3–0)	Lee Smith (1–1)	**Ed Farmer** (6)	30,146	28–24
53	June 8	Cubs	5–2	**Marty Bystrom** (1–0)	Tom Filer (0–1)	**Sparky Lyle** (2)	30,289	29–24
54	June 9	Cubs	4–2	**Steve Carlton** (7–6)	Ferguson Jenkins (3–8)	None	31,099	30–24
55	June 11	Pirates	0–1	Kent Tekulve (4–2)	**Larry Christenson** (3–4)	None	30,870	30–25
56	June 12	Pirates	2–9	Manny Sarmiento (2–0)	**Mike Krukow** (4–5)	None	28,665	30–26
–	June 13	Pirates	Postponed (rain); Makeup: August 9 as a traditional double-header					
57	June 14	@ Cubs	11–12	Ferguson Jenkins (4–8)	**Steve Carlton** (7–7)	None	10,797	30–27
58	June 15	@ Cubs	5–8	Doug Bird (4–6)	**Dick Ruthven** (5–4)	Mike Proly (1)	8,639	30–28
59	June 16	@ Cubs	6–7 (11)	Dick Tidrow (2–1)	**Warren Brusstar** (2–3)	None	9,377	30–29
60	June 17	@ Pirates	4–3 (11)	**Ron Reed** (2–1)	Rod Scurry (4–4)	None	9,405	31–29
61	June 18	@ Pirates	8–3	**Mike Krukow** (5–5)	Manny Sarmiento (2–1)	None	23,320	32–29
62	June 19	@ Pirates	8–3	**Steve Carlton** (8–7)	Don Robinson (6–3)	None	13,065	33–29
63	June 20	@ Pirates	1–3	Kent Tekulve (5–2)	**Dick Ruthven** (5–5)	None	25,791	33–30
64	June 21	@ Cardinals	5–7	Bruce Sutter (6–5)	**Ron Reed** (2–2)	None	19,141	33–31
65	June 22	@ Cardinals	2–3	John Stuper (2–0)	**Sparky Lyle** (2–2)	None	19,672	33–32
66	June 23	@ Cardinals	7–1	**Mike Krukow** (6–5)	Steve Mura (5–6)	None	19,882	34–32
67	June 24	@ Cardinals	10–2	**Steve Carlton** (9–7)	Bob Forsch (8–3)	None	33,032	35–32
68	June 25 (1)	Mets	1–0	**Dick Ruthven** (6–5)	Pete Falcone (4–4)	None	see 2nd game	36–32
69	June 25 (2)	Mets	5–3	**Ed Farmer** (2–4)	Pat Zachry (4–3)	**Tug McGraw** (1)	36,775	37–32
70	June 26 (1)	Mets	4–3	**Marty Bystrom** (2–0)	Randy Jones (6–7)	None	see 2nd game	38–32
71	June 26 (2)	Mets	7–4	**Tug McGraw** (1–0)	Neil Allen (2–4)	None	45,513	39–32
72	June 27	Mets	8–3	**Mike Krukow** (7–5)	Craig Swan (5–3)	None	43,134	40–32
73	June 28	Cardinals	1–0	**Steve Carlton** (10–7)	Steve Mura (5–7)	None	34,440	41–32
74	June 29	Cardinals	3–15	Joaquín Andújar (7–5)	**Dick Ruthven** (6–6)	None	23,850	41–33
75	June 30	Cardinals	6–3	**Larry Christenson** (4–4)	Bob Forsch (8–4)	**Tug McGraw** (2)	31,403	42–33

July (16–9)

#	Date	Opponent	Score	Win	Loss	Save	Attendance	Record
76	July 2	@ Mets	4–8	Craig Swan (6–3)	**Marty Bystrom** (2–1)	Terry Leach (1)	17,528	42–34
–	July 3	@ Mets	Postponed (rain); Makeup: July 4 as a traditional double-header					
77	July 4 (1)	@ Mets	9–7	**Steve Carlton** (11–7)	Charlie Puleo (6–5)	None	see 2nd game	43–34
78	July 4 (2)	@ Mets	7–2	**Mike Krukow** (8–5)	Randy Jones (6–8)	None	20,897	44–34
79	July 5	Giants	1–3	Bill Laskey (7–5)	**Dick Ruthven** (6–7)	None	63,501	44–35
80	July 6	Giants	3–2	**Sparky Lyle** (3–2)	Fred Breining (4–2)	**Tug McGraw** (3)	22,470	45–35
81	July 7	Padres	3–5	Tim Lollar (9–2)	**Marty Bystrom** (2–2)	Luis DeLeón (7)	26,695	45–36
82	July 8	Padres	3–5	John Montefusco (7–4)	**Mike Krukow** (8–6)	Eric Show (3)	24,765	45–37
83	July 9	Dodgers	4–6 (11)	Dave Stewart (5–4)	**Tug McGraw** (1–1)	None	40,037	45–38
84	July 10	Dodgers	4–2	**Dick Ruthven** (7–7)	Bob Welch (9–6)	None	41,268	46–38
85	July 11	Dodgers	4–3	**Larry Christenson** (5–4)	Fernando Valenzuela (12–7)	**Ron Reed** (1)	48,773	47–38
–	July 13	**1982 Major League Baseball All-Star Game at Olympic Stadium in Montreal**						
86	July 15	@ Giants	2–1	**Mike Krukow** (9–6)	Rich Gale (3–9)	**Tug McGraw** (4)	8,004	48–38
87	July 16	@ Giants	1–0	**Steve Carlton** (12–7)	Bill Laskey (7–7)	None	7,720	49–38
88	July 17	@ Giants	5–3 (11)	**Ron Reed** (3–2)	Fred Breining (4–3)	**Sid Monge** (1)	30,790	50–38
89	July 18	@ Giants	3–4	Atlee Hammaker (7–5)	**Larry Christenson** (5–5)	None	15,657	50–39
90	July 19	@ Padres	7–6	**Sid Monge** (4–0)	John Curtis (6–6)	**Ron Reed** (2)	33,558	51–39
91	July 20	@ Padres	0–2	John Montefusco (8–5)	**Steve Carlton** (12–8)	Luis DeLeón (9)	16,020	51–40
92	July 21	@ Padres	7–1	**Dick Ruthven** (8–7)	Tim Lollar (10–4)	None	16,984	52–40
93	July 23	@ Dodgers	6–3	**Porfi Altamirano** (2–0)	Dave Stewart (5–5)	**Ron Reed** (3)	47,684	53–40
94	July 24	@ Dodgers	2–3	Bob Welch (10–7)	**Marty Bystrom** (2–3)	Steve Howe (10)	49,110	53–41
95	July 25	@ Dodgers	1–0	**Steve Carlton** (13–8)	Jerry Reuss (10–8)	None	46,623	54–41
96	July 27	@ Pirates	0–4	Larry McWilliams (7–4)	**Dick Ruthven** (8–8)	Rod Scurry (7)	23,609	54–42
97	July 28	@ Pirates	4–3	**Larry Christenson** (6–5)	Rick Rhoden (6–9)	**Ron Reed** (4)	31,867	55–42
98	July 29	Cubs	3–2	**Mike Krukow** (10–6)	Dick Tidrow (4–2)	**Ron Reed** (5)	33,724	56–42
99	July 30	Cubs	3–1	**Steve Carlton** (14–8)	Ferguson Jenkins (6–12)	None	33,165	57–42
100	July 31	Cubs	2–0	**Marty Bystrom** (3–3)	Allen Ripley (3–4)	**Porfi Altamirano** (1)	50,203	58–42

August (15–17)

#	Date	Opponent	Score	Win	Loss	Save	Attendance	Record
101	August 1	Cubs	2–7	Dickie Noles (7–9)	**Dick Ruthven** (8–9)	None	57,652	58–43
102	August 2	Expos	2–1	**Larry Christenson** (7–5)	Bill Gullickson (8–9)	**Tug McGraw** (5)	34,542	59–43
103	August 3	Expos	3–2	**Mike Krukow** (11–6)	David Palmer (5–4)	**Ron Reed** (6)	34,306	60–43
104	August 4	Expos	5–4	**Steve Carlton** (15–8)	Scott Sanderson (6–10)	None	36,814	61–43
105	August 5	Expos	2–9	Charlie Lea (8–6)	**Marty Bystrom** (3–4)	Bryn Smith (2)	52,327	61–44
106	August 6	@ Cubs	2–4	Allen Ripley (4–4)	**Dick Ruthven** (8–10)	Lee Smith (4)	17,163	61–45
107	August 7	@ Cubs	2–3	Dickie Noles (8–9)	**Larry Christenson** (7–6)	Lee Smith (5)	25,871	61–46
108	August 8	@ Cubs	5–8	Dick Tidrow (5–2)	**Tug McGraw** (1–2)	Lee Smith (6)	28,279	61–47
109	August 9 (1)	Pirates	4–3	**Steve Carlton** (16–8)	Kent Tekulve (7–6)	None	see 2nd game	62–47
110	August 9 (2)	Pirates	6–9^{^{[a]}}	Enrique Romo (7–2)	**Ron Reed** (3–3)	Kent Tekulve (17)	51,568	62–48
111	August 10	Pirates	9–5	**Marty Bystrom** (4–4)	Manny Sarmiento (5–2)	None	36,825	63–48
112	August 11	Pirates	4–1	**Sid Monge** (5–0)	Rick Rhoden (6–11)	**Ron Reed** (7)	27,202	64–48
113	August 12 (1)	@ Expos	3–6	Bill Gullickson (9–9)	**Larry Christenson** (7–7)	Jeff Reardon (18)	see 2nd game	64–49
114	August 12 (2)	@ Expos	7–8	Woodie Fryman (7–2)	**Sparky Lyle** (3–3)	None	55,097	64–50
115	August 13	@ Expos	2–3	Bryn Smith (1–1)	**Mike Krukow** (11–7)	Jeff Reardon (19)	48,237	64–51
116	August 14	@ Expos	15–11	**Jerry Reed** (1–0)	Jeff Reardon (4–2)	None	50,572	65–51
117	August 15	@ Expos	3–1	**Marty Bystrom** (5–4)	Steve Rogers (14–6)	**Ron Reed** (8)	59,094	66–51
118	August 17	@ Astros	0–2	Vern Ruhle (7–8)	**Larry Christenson** (7–8)	None	19,725	66–52
119	August 18	@ Astros	5–3 (15)	**Tug McGraw** (2–2)	Mike LaCoss (4–5)	None	18,449	67–52
120	August 19	@ Astros	6–7 (11)	Dave Smith (2–4)	**Sid Monge** (5–1)	None	18,797	67–53
121	August 20	@ Reds	9–2	**Dick Ruthven** (9–10)	Greg A. Harris (2–4)	None	17,638	68–53
122	August 21	@ Reds	3–10	Bob Shirley (5–9)	**Marty Bystrom** (5–5)	None	24,099	68–54
123	August 22	@ Reds	8–2	**Larry Christenson** (8–8)	Mario Soto (10–9)	None	21,670	69–54
124	August 23	@ Braves	3–4	Rick Camp (9–7)	**Ron Reed** (3–4)	None	16,224	69–55
125	August 24	@ Braves	7–9	Phil Niekro (12–3)	**Steve Carlton** (16–9)	Gene Garber (24)	22,709	69–56
126	August 25	@ Braves	11–9 (10)	**Ron Reed** (4–4)	Gene Garber (6–7)	None	23,955	70–56
127	August 27	Reds	1–8	Mario Soto (11–9)	**Larry Christenson** (8–9)	None	34,429	70–57
128	August 28	Reds	7–1	**Mike Krukow** (12–7)	Frank Pastore (7–10)	None	38,333	71–57
129	August 29	Reds	3–1	**Steve Carlton** (17–9)	Bruce Berenyi (8–14)	None	39,237	72–57
130	August 30 (1)	Braves	6–1	**Dick Ruthven** (10–10)	Pascual Pérez (0–3)	None	see 2nd game	73–57
131	August 30 (2)	Braves	9–11 (12)	Steve Bedrosian (7–6)	**Tug McGraw** (2–3)	Donnie Moore (1)	43,854	73–58
132	August 31	Braves	0–3	Tommy Boggs (2–0)	**Ed Farmer** (2–5)	Gene Garber (26)	29,380	73–59

September (14–13)

#	Date	Opponent	Score	Win	Loss	Save	Attendance	Record
133	September 1	Braves	0–4	Rick Camp (11–7)	**Mike Krukow** (12–8)	Gene Garber (27)	24,788	73–60
134	September 3	Astros	2–1	**Steve Carlton** (18–9)	Joe Niekro (13–10)	None	28,320	74–60
135	September 4	Astros	4–2	**Sid Monge** (6–1)	Bob Knepper (5–14)	**Ron Reed** (9)	35,747	75–60
136	September 5	Astros	4–3	**Porfi Altamirano** (3–0)	Nolan Ryan (14–10)	**Ron Reed** (10)	33,983	76–60
137	September 6	@ Cubs	3–4	Doug Bird (9–11)	**Mike Krukow** (12–9)	Lee Smith (12)	23,510	76–61
138	September 7	@ Cubs	7–5	**Tug McGraw** (3–3)	Bill Campbell (3–5)	None	7,003	77–61
139	September 8	@ Cubs	4–3	**Steve Carlton** (19–9)	Dick Tidrow (6–3)	**Ron Reed** (11)	8,233	78–61
140	September 10	@ Pirates	7–5	**Dick Ruthven** (11–10)	John Candelaria (12–6)	**Sid Monge** (2)	15,596	79–61
141	September 11	@ Pirates	9–10	Kent Tekulve (11–8)	**Ron Reed** (4–5)	None	19,842	79–62
142	September 12	@ Pirates	2–4	Rick Rhoden (10–12)	**Larry Christenson** (8–10)	Kent Tekulve (19)	19,089	79–63
143	September 13	Cardinals	2–0	**Steve Carlton** (20–9)	Bob Forsch (14–9)	None	40,109	80–63
144	September 14	Cardinals	0–2	John Stuper (7–6)	**Mike Krukow** (12–10)	Bruce Sutter (32)	32,854	80–64
145	September 15	Cardinals	0–8	Joaquín Andújar (13–10)	**John Denny** (6–12)	None	33,337	80–65
146	September 17	Pirates	2–4	Rick Rhoden (11–12)	**Steve Carlton** (20–10)	Kent Tekulve (20)	37,262	80–66
147	September 18	Pirates	5–4	**Sid Monge** (7–1)	Don Robinson (15–11)	**Ron Reed** (12)	31,468	81–66
148	September 19	Pirates	1–8	Manny Sarmiento (8–3)	**Mike Krukow** (12–11)	None	37,352	81–67
149	September 20	@ Cardinals	1–4	Joaquín Andújar (14–10)	**John Denny** (6–13)	Bruce Sutter (34)	35,899	81–68
150	September 21	@ Cardinals	5–2	**Steve Carlton** (21–10)	Eric Rasmussen (0–1)	None	38,942	82–68
151	September 22	@ Expos	4–11	Bill Gullickson (12–12)	**Dick Ruthven** (11–11)	None	18,123	82–69
152	September 23	@ Expos	2–0 (11)	**Ron Reed** (5–5)	Steve Rogers (17–8)	**Porfi Altamirano** (2)	14,762	83–69
153	September 24	@ Mets	2–1	**Mike Krukow** (13–11)	Walt Terrell (0–2)	**Ron Reed** (13)	7,661	84–69
154	September 25	@ Mets	1–2	Craig Swan (11–7)	**Steve Carlton** (21–11)	None	8,870	84–70
155	September 26	@ Mets	4–6	Charlie Puleo (9–9)	**Ed Farmer** (2–6)	None	16,384	84–71
156	September 27	Cubs	1–8	Randy Martz (11–10)	**Marty Bystrom** (5–6)	None	15,744	84–72
157	September 28	Cubs	3–2	**Larry Christenson** (9–10)	Doug Bird (9–14)	**Ron Reed** (14)	14,431	85–72
158	September 29	Expos	4–0	**Steve Carlton** (22–11)	Bryn Smith (2–4)	None	16,024	86–72
159	September 30	Expos	5–4	**Porfi Altamirano** (4–0)	Jeff Reardon (7–4)	None	15,439	87–72

October (2–1)

#	Date	Opponent	Score	Win	Loss	Save	Attendance	Record
160	October 1	Mets	0–1 (10)	Terry Leach (2–1)	**Porfi Altamirano** (4–1)	None	16,072	87–73
161	October 2	Mets	4–3	**Porfi Altamirano** (5–1)	Pat Zachry (6–9)	None	32,729	88–73
162	October 3	Mets	4–1	**Steve Carlton** (23–11)	Ed Lynch (4–8)	None	19,383	89–73

^{^[a]}The August 9 game was suspended in the bottom of the 8th with the score 6–9 and was completed August 10, 1982.

=== Roster ===
1982 Philadelphia Phillies
**Roster**
**Pitchers**: 30 Porfi Altamirano; 37 Stan Bahnsen; 41 Jay Baller; 40 Warren Brusstar; 50 Marty Bystrom; 32 Steve Carlton; 38 Larry Christenson; 40 John Denny; 46,22 Ed Farmer; 39 Mike Krukow; 28 Sparky Lyle; 45 Tug McGraw; 49 Sid Monge; 35 Jerry Reed; 42 Ron Reed; 44 Dick Ruthven	**Catchers**: 6 Bo Díaz; 11,17 Ozzie Virgil; **Infielders**: 16 Luis Aguayo; 18,11 Iván DeJesús; 15 Julio Franco; 24,12 Len Matuszek; 25 Willie Montañez; 10 Dave Roberts; 14 Pete Rose; 20 Mike Schmidt; 9 Manny Trillo; 25 Del Unser	**Outfielders**: 26 Dick Davis; 24,22 Bob Dernier; 21 Greg Gross; 31 Garry Maddox; 34 Gary Matthews; 26 Bill Robinson; 27 Alejandro Sánchez; 29 George Vukovich; **Other batters**: 18 Bob Molinaro	**Manager**: 8 Pat Corrales; **Coaches**: 4 Dave Bristol (Third Base); 2 Deron Johnson (Hitting & First Base); 3 Claude Osteen (Pitching); 5 Mike Ryan (Bullpen); 7 Bobby Wine (Bench)

== Player stats ==
= Indicates team leader

=== Batting ===
==== Starters by position ====
Note: Pos = Position; G = Games played; AB = At bats; H = Hits; Avg. = Batting average; HR = Home runs; RBI = Runs batted in

Pos	Player	G	AB	H	Avg.	HR	RBI
C	Bo Díaz	144	525	151	.288	18	85
1B	Pete Rose	162	634	172	.271	3	54
2B	Manny Trillo	149	549	149	.271	0	39
3B	Mike Schmidt	148	514	144	.280	35	87
SS	Iván DeJesús	161	536	128	.239	3	59
LF	Gary Matthews	162	616	173	.281	19	83
CF	Garry Maddox	119	412	117	.284	8	61
RF	George Vukovich	123	335	91	.272	6	42

==== Other batters ====
Note: G = Games played; AB = At bats; H = Hits; Avg. = Batting average; HR = Home runs; RBI = Runs batted in

Player	G	AB	H	Avg.	HR	RBI
Bob Dernier	122	370	92	.249	4	21
Greg Gross	119	134	40	.299	0	10
Ozzie Virgil	49	101	24	.238	3	8
Bill Robinson	35	69	18	.261	3	19
Dick Davis	28	68	19	.279	2	7
Luis Aguayo	50	56	15	.268	3	7
Len Matuszek	25	39	3	.077	0	3
Dave Roberts	28	33	6	.182	0	2
Julio Franco	16	29	8	.276	0	3
Willie Montañez	18	16	1	.063	0	1
Bob Molinaro	19	14	4	.286	0	2
Del Unser	19	14	0	.000	0	0
Alejandro Sánchez	7	14	4	.286	2	4

=== Pitching ===
= Indicates league leader

==== Starting pitchers ====
Note: G = Games pitched; IP = Innings pitched; W = Wins; L = Losses; ERA = Earned run average; SO = Strikeouts

Player	G	IP	W	L	ERA	SO
Steve Carlton	38	295.2	23	11	3.10	286
Larry Christenson	33	223.0	9	10	3.47	145
Mike Krukow	33	208.0	13	11	3.12	138
Dick Ruthven	33	204.1	11	11	3.79	115
Marty Bystrom	19	89.0	5	6	4.85	50
John Denny	4	22.1	0	2	4.03	19

==== Other pitchers ====
Note: G = Games pitched; IP = Innings pitched; W = Wins; L = Losses; ERA = Earned run average; SO = Strikeouts

Player	G	IP	W	L	ERA	SO
Jay Baller	4	8.0	0	0	3.38	7

==== Relief pitchers ====
Note: G = Games pitched; W = Wins; L = Losses; SV = Saves; ERA = Earned run average; SO = Strikeouts

Player	G	W	L	SV	ERA	SO
Ron Reed	57	5	5	14	2.66	57
Ed Farmer	47	2	6	6	4.86	58
Sid Monge	47	7	1	2	3.75	43
Tug McGraw	34	3	3	5	4.31	25
Sparky Lyle	34	3	3	2	5.15	12
Porfi Altamirano	29	5	1	2	4.15	26
Warren Brusstar	22	2	3	2	4.76	11
Stan Bahnsen	8	0	0	0	1.35	9
Jerry Reed	7	1	0	0	5.19	1

== Awards and honors ==
1982 Major League Baseball All-Star Game

- Pete Rose, first base, starter
- Mike Schmidt, third base, starter
- Manny Trillo, second base, starter
- Steve Carlton, reserve

== Farm system ==
Level	Team	League	Manager
AAA	Oklahoma City 89ers	American Association	Ron Clark, Cot Deal and Tony Taylor
AA	Reading Phillies	Eastern League	John Felske
A	Peninsula Pilots	Carolina League	Bill Dancy
A	Spartanburg Traders	South Atlantic League	Tony Taylor and P. J. Carey
A-Short Season	Bend Phillies	Northwest League	Roly de Armas
Rookie	Helena Phillies	Pioneer League	Ron Smith
