= 1982 St. Louis Cardinals season =

Major League Baseball season

1982 St. Louis Cardinals
- World Series champions National League champions National League East champions
- League: National League
- Division: East
- Ballpark: Busch Memorial Stadium
- City: St. Louis, Missouri
- Record: 92–70 (56.8%)
- Divisional place: 1st
- Owners: August "Gussie" Busch
- General manager: Whitey Herzog, Joe McDonald
- Manager: Whitey Herzog
- Television: KSDK (Jack Buck, Mike Shannon, Jay Randolph)
- Radio: KMOX (Jack Buck, Mike Shannon, Dan Kelly)

The 1982 St. Louis Cardinals season was the 101st season for the St. Louis Cardinals in St. Louis, Missouri and the 91st season in the National League. Making up for the previous season's near-miss, the Cardinals went 92–70 during the season and won their first-ever National League East title by three games over the Philadelphia Phillies. They achieved their first postseason appearance since 1968 and defeated the National League West champion Atlanta Braves in three straight games to claim the NL pennant. From there, they went on to win the World Series in seven games over the American League champion Milwaukee Brewers. It was the Cardinals' first World Championship since 1967, and their last until they opened the current Busch Stadium in 2006.

== Offseason ==
- October 21, 1981: Bob Sykes was traded by the Cardinals to the New York Yankees for Willie McGee.
- October 23, 1981: Jeff Little was traded by the Cardinals to the Minnesota Twins for Mike Kinnunen.
- November 20, 1981: Silvio Martínez and Lary Sorensen were traded by the Cardinals to the Cleveland Indians as part of a three-team trade. The Philadelphia Phillies traded Lonnie Smith to the Cardinals. The Indians traded Bo Díaz to the Phillies. The Phillies sent a player to be named later to the Indians. The Phillies completed the deal by sending Scott Munninghoff to the Indians on December 9.
- December 10, 1981: Sixto Lezcano, Garry Templeton and a player to be named later were traded by the Cardinals to the San Diego Padres for Ozzie Smith, Steve Mura and a player to be named later. The deal was completed on February 19, 1982, with the Padres sending Al Olmsted to the Cardinals and the Cardinals sending Luis DeLeón to the Padres.
- December 29, 1981: Joaquín Andújar was signed as a free agent by the Cardinals.

== Regular season ==
First baseman Keith Hernandez and shortstop Ozzie Smith won Gold Gloves this year.

=== Season standings ===
NL East
Team	W	L	Pct.	GB	Home	Road
St. Louis Cardinals	92	70	.568	—	46‍–‍35	46‍–‍35
Philadelphia Phillies	89	73	.549	3	51‍–‍30	38‍–‍43
Montreal Expos	86	76	.531	6	40‍–‍41	46‍–‍35
Pittsburgh Pirates	84	78	.519	8	42‍–‍39	42‍–‍39
Chicago Cubs	73	89	.451	19	38‍–‍43	35‍–‍46
New York Mets	65	97	.401	27	33‍–‍48	32‍–‍49

=== Record vs. opponents ===
1982 National League record Sources:
Team	ATL	CHC	CIN	HOU	LAD	MON	NYM	PHI	PIT	SD	SF	STL
Atlanta	—	8–4	14–4	10–8	7–11	5–7	9–3	6–6	4–8	11–7	8–10	7–5
Chicago	4–8	—	6–6	9–3	5–7	6–12	9–9	9–9	9–9	4–8	6–6	6–12
Cincinnati	4–14	6–6	—	7–11	7–11	4–8	7–5	5–7	4–8	6–12	6–12	5–7
Houston	8–10	3–9	11–7	—	7–11	4–8	8–4	7–5	9–3	9–9	5–13	6–6
Los Angeles	11–7	7–5	11–7	11–7	—	8–4	6–6	4–8	5–7	9–9	9–9	7–5
Montreal	7–5	12–6	8–4	8–4	4–8	—	11–7	8–10	7–11	7–5	4–8	10–8
New York	3–9	9–9	5–7	4–8	6–6	7–11	—	7–11	8–10	6–6	4–8	6–12
Philadelphia	6-6	9–9	7–5	5–7	8–4	10–8	11–7	—	9–9	7–5	10–2	7–11
Pittsburgh	8–4	9–9	8–4	3–9	7–5	11–7	10–8	9–9	—	6–6	6–6	7–11
San Diego	7–11	8–4	12–6	9–9	9–9	5–7	6–6	5–7	6–6	—	10–8	4–8
San Francisco	10–8	6–6	12–6	13–5	9–9	8–4	8–4	2–10	6–6	8–10	—	5–7
St. Louis	5–7	12–6	7–5	6–6	5–7	8–10	12–6	11–7	11–7	8–4	7–5	—

=== Opening Day Lineup ===
Opening Day Starters
#	Name	Position
27	Lonnie Smith	CF
28	Tom Herr	2B
37	Keith Hernandez	1B
15	Darrell Porter	C
25	George Hendrick	RF
19	Dane Iorg	LF
26	Steve Braun	3B
1	Ozzie Smith	SS
31	Bob Forsch	P

=== Notable games ===
- May 30, 1982: The Cardinals rallied twice in their last at-bat in a thrilling 6–5 victory over the San Diego Padres at Busch Memorial Stadium. St. Louis trailed 3–0 entering the bottom of the ninth when Keith Hernandez led off with a single to left field. Hernandez took second on a single by George Hendrick and scored on Lonnie Smith's RBI double. After a Mike Ramsey ground out, Julio González reached on Padre third baseman Luis Salazar's error, allowing Hendrick to score and cutting the deficit to 3–2, and two batters later, Smith scored on Tom Herr's sacrifice fly to tie the game. After San Diego tacked on an additional two runs off Bruce Sutter in the top of the tenth inning, the Cardinals rallied again in the bottom half. Padres reliever Gary Lucas retired Orlando Sánchez and Hernandez to start the inning, but allowed a two-out single to Hendrick. Lonnie Smith then doubled Hendrick home to bring St. Louis back within 5–4, and Ramsey's subsequent RBI single tied the game. After Julio Gonzalez was hit by a pitch, Dane Iorg lined a single into center field, scoring Ramsey with the winning run.

=== Notable transactions ===
- June 7, 1982: 1982 Major League Baseball draft
  - Terry Pendleton was drafted by the Cardinals in the 7th round. Player signed June 12, 1982.
  - Vince Coleman was drafted by the Cardinals in the 10th round. Player signed June 9, 1982.
- June 25, 1982: Joe Boever was signed by the Cardinals as an amateur free agent.
- August 11, 1982: Eric Rasmussen was purchased by the Cardinals from the Leones de Yucatán.

=== Roster ===
1982 St. Louis Cardinals roster
**Roster**
**Pitchers**: 47 Joaquín Andújar; 40 Doug Bair; 31 Bob Forsch; 36 Jim Kaat; 44 Jeff Keener; 32 Jeff Lahti; 39 Dave LaPoint; 34 Mark Littell; 33 John Martin; 38 Steve Mura; 34 Eric Rasmussen; 46 Andy Rincon; 48 John Stuper; 42 Bruce Sutter	**Catchers**: 11 Glenn Brummer; 15 Darrell Porter; 23 Orlando Sánchez; 18 Gene Tenace; **Infielders**: 14 Julio González; 37 Keith Hernandez; 28 Tom Herr; 10 Ken Oberkfell; 35,12 Kelly Paris; 5 Mike Ramsey; 1 Ozzie Smith	**Outfielders**: 26 Steve Braun; 22 David Green; 25 George Hendrick; 19 Dane Iorg; 21 Tito Landrum; 51 Willie McGee; 29 Gene Roof; 27 Lonnie Smith	**Manager**: 24 Whitey Herzog; **Coaches**: 4 Chuck Hiller; 9 Hub Kittle; 8 Hal Lanier; 3 Dave Ricketts; 2 Red Schoendienst

=== Game log ===
1982 St. Louis Cardinals Game Log, 92–70 (.568)
April: 14–7 (.667) (Home: 6–3; Away: 8–4)

#	Date	Opponent	Score	Win	Loss	Save	Record	Box / L10
10	April 16	Phillies	3–2				7–3	W6
11	April 17	Phillies	6–0				8–3	W7
12	April 18	Phillies	6–5 (11)				9–3	W8
15	April 23	@ Phillies	9–2				12–3	W11
16	April 24	@ Phillies	7–4				13–3	W12
17	April 25	@ Phillies	4–8				13–4	L1

May: 17–11 (.607) (Home: 8–4; Away: 9–7)

#	Date	Opponent	Score	Win	Loss	Save	Record	Box / L10
28	May 7	Braves	3–6 (10)				18–10	L1
29	May 8	Braves	8–7				19–10	W1
30	May 9	Braves	0–3				19–11	L1
33	May 13	@ Braves	10–9				21–12	W2
34	May 14	@ Braves	1–2				21–13	L1
35	May 15	@ Braves	7–6 (10)				22–13	W1
36	May 16	@ Braves	2–5				22–14	L1
40	May 21	@ Dodgers	6–3				25–15	W2
41	May 22	@ Dodgers	2–3				25–16	L1
42	May 23	@ Dodgers	0–5				25–17	L2
43	May 24	@ Giants	6–0				26–17	W1
44	May 25	@ Giants	8–3				27–17	W2
45	May 26	@ Giants	8–4				28–17	W3
49	May 31	Giants	11–6				31–18	W2

June: 12–16 (.429) (Home: 7–9; Away: 5–7)

#	Date	Opponent	Score	Win	Loss	Save	Record	Box / L10
50	June 1	Giants	3–4 (11)				31–19	L1
51	June 2	Giants	1–0				32–19	W1
52	June 4	Dodgers	5–2				33–19	W2
53	June 5	Dodgers	2–6				33–20	L1
54	June 6	Dodgers	3–5				33–21	L2
55	June 7	@ Expos	2–3				33–22	L3
56	June 8	@ Expos	5–4 (12)				34–22	W1
57	June 9	@ Expos	5–1				34–23	L1
60	June 14	Expos	2–1				36–24	W1
61	June 15	Expos	3–2 (11)				37–24	W2
62	June 16	Expos	3–8				37–25	L1
67	June 21	Phillies	7–5				39–28	W1
68	June 22	Phillies	3–2				40–28	W2
69	June 23	Phillies	1–7				40–29	L1
70	June 24	Phillies	2–10				40–30	L2
75	June 28	@ Phillies	0–1				42–33	L2
76	June 29	@ Phillies	15–3				43–33	W1
77	June 30	@ Phillies	3–6				43–34	L1

July: 15–10 (.600) (Home: 10–5; Away: 5–5)

#	Date	Opponent	Score	Win	Loss	Save	Record	Box / L10
83	July 7	@ Braves	2–3				46–37	L1
84	July 8	@ Braves	5–2				47–37	W1
92	July 19	Braves	1–4				51–41	L1
93	July 20	Braves	6–8				51–42	L2
94	July 21	Braves	8–0				52–42	W1
100	July 29	@ Expos	3–4 (10)				57–43	L1
101	July 30	@ Expos	4–5 (11)				57–44	L2
102	July 31	@ Expos	10–1				58–44	W1

August: 17–12 (.586) (Home: 8–8; Away: 9–4)

#	Date	Opponent	Score	Win	Loss	Save	Record	Box / L10
103	August 1	@ Expos	4–5				58–45	L1
108	August 6	Expos	3–5				60–48	L1
109	August 7	Expos	9–5				61–48	W1
110	August 8	Expos	1–2				61–49	L1
121	August 20	Giants	7–8				69–52	L2
122	August 21	Giants	7–6				70–52	W1
123	August 22	Giants	5–4 (12)				71–52	W2
124	August 23	Dodgers	11–3				72–52	W3
125	August 24	Dodgers	2–5				72–53	L1
126	August 25	Dodgers	3–11				72–54	L2
130	August 30	@ Dodgers	3–2				75–55	W1
131	August 31	@ Dodgers	1–4				75–56	L1

September: 16–13 (.552) (Home: 7–6; Away: 9–7)

#	Date	Opponent	Score	Win	Loss	Save	Record	Box / L10
132	September 1	@ Dodgers	6–5 (13)				76–56	W1
133	September 3	@ Giants	2–3 (10)				76–57	L1
134	September 4	@ Giants	4–5				76–58	L2
135	September 5	@ Giants	1–5				76–59	L3
136	September 6	Expos	1–0				77–59	W1
137	September 7	Expos	4–7				77–60	L1
138	September 8	Expos	1–0				78–60	W1
142	September 13	@ Phillies	0–2				79–63	L2
143	September 14	@ Phillies	2–0				80–63	W1
144	September 15	@ Phillies	8–0				81–63	W2
150	September 20	Phillies	4–1				87–63	W8
151	September 21	Phillies	2–5				87–64	L1
157	September 27	@ Expos	4–2				91–66	W1
158	September 28	@ Expos	4–5 (10)				91–67	L1

October: 1–1 (.500) (Home: 0–0; Away: 1–1)

#	Date	Opponent	Score	Win	Loss	Save	Record	Box / L10

Legend: = Win = Loss = Postponement
Bold = Cardinals team member

== Player stats ==
=== Batting ===
==== Starters by position ====
Note: Pos = Position; G = Games played; AB = At bats; H = Hits; Avg. = Batting average; HR = Home runs; RBI = Runs batted in

Pos	Player	G	AB	H	Avg.	HR	RBI
C	Darrell Porter	120	373	86	.231	12	48
1B	Keith Hernandez	160	579	173	.299	7	94
2B	Tom Herr	135	493	131	.266	0	36
3B	Ken Oberkfell	137	470	136	.289	2	34
SS	Ozzie Smith	140	488	121	.248	2	43
LF	Lonnie Smith	156	592	182	.307	8	69
CF	Willie McGee	123	422	125	.296	4	56
RF	George Hendrick	136	515	145	.282	19	104

==== Other batters ====
Note: G = Games played; AB = At bats; H = Hits; Avg. = Batting average; HR = Home runs; RBI = Runs batted in

Player	G	AB	H	Avg.	HR	RBI
Mike Ramsey	112	256	59	.230	1	21
Dane Iorg	102	238	70	.294	0	34
David Green	76	166	47	.283	2	23
Gene Tenace	66	124	32	.258	7	18
Julio González	42	87	21	.241	1	7
Tito Landrum	79	72	20	.278	2	14
Glenn Brummer	35	64	15	.234	0	8
Steve Braun	58	62	17	.274	0	4
Orlando Sánchez	26	37	7	.189	0	3
Kelly Paris	12	29	3	.103	0	1
Gene Roof	11	15	4	.267	0	2

=== Pitching ===
= Indicates league leader

==== Starting pitchers ====
Note: G = Games pitched; IP = Innings pitched; W = Wins; L = Losses; ERA = Earned run average; SO = Strikeouts

Player	G	IP	W	L	ERA	SO
Joaquín Andújar	38	265.2	15	10	2.47	137
Bob Forsch	36	233.0	15	9	3.48	69
Steve Mura	35	184.1	12	11	4.05	84
John Stuper	23	136.2	9	7	3.36	53

==== Other pitchers ====
Note: G = Games pitched; IP = Innings pitched; W = Wins; L = Losses; ERA = Earned run average; SO = Strikeouts

Player	G	IP	W	L	ERA	SO
Dave LaPoint	42	152.2	9	3	3.42	81
John Martin	24	66.0	4	5	4.23	21
Andy Rincon	11	40.0	2	3	4.73	11
Eric Rasmussen	8	18.1	1	2	4.42	15

==== Relief pitchers ====
Note: G = Games pitched; W = Wins; L = Losses; SV = Saves; ERA = Earned run average; SO = Strikeouts

Player	G	W	L	SV	ERA	SO
Bruce Sutter	70	9	8	36	2.90	61
Doug Bair	63	5	3	8	2.55	68
Jim Kaat	63	5	3	2	4.08	35
Jeff Lahti	33	5	4	0	3.81	22
Jeff Keener	19	1	1	0	1.61	25
Mark Littell	16	0	1	0	5.23	7

== Postseason ==
=== Game log ===
1982 Postseason (7–3)
National League Championship Series (3–0)

Game	Date	Opponent	Score	Win	Loss	Save	Record
–	October 6	Braves	Postponed (rain) (Makeup date: October 7)				
1	October 7	Braves	7–0	Forsch (1–0)	Pérez (0–1)	–	1–0
–	October 8	Braves	Postponed (rain) (Makeup date: October 9)				
2	October 9	Braves	4–3	Sutter (1–0)	Garber (0–1)	–	2–0
3	October 10	@ Braves	6–2	Andújar (1–0)	Camp (0–1)	Sutter (1)	3–0

World Series (4–3)

Game	Date	Opponent	Score	Win	Loss	Save	Record
1	October 12	Brewers	0–10	Caldwell (1–0)	Forsch (0–1)	–	0–1
2	October 13	Brewers	5–4	Sutter (1–0)	McClure (0–1)	–	1–1
3	October 15	@ Brewers	6–2	Andújar (1–0)	Vuckovich (0–1)	Sutter (1)	2–1
4	October 16	@ Brewers	5–7	Slaton (1–0)	Bair (0–1)	McClure (1)	2–2
5	October 17	@ Brewers	4–6	Caldwell (2–0)	Forsch (0–2)	McClure (2)	2–3
6	October 19	Brewers	13–1	Stuper (1–0)	Sutton (0–1)	–	3–3
7	October 20	Brewers	6–3	Andújar (2–0)	McClure (0–2)	Sutter (2)	4–3

=== NLCS ===
==== Game 1 ====
October 7, Busch Stadium

Team	1	2	3	4	5	6	7	8	9	R	H	E
Atlanta	0	0	0	0	0	0	0	0	0	0	3	0
St. Louis	0	0	1	0	0	5	0	1	X	7	13	1
W: Bob Forsch (1–0) L: Pascual Pérez (0–1) SV: None
HRs: ATL – None STL – None

==== Game 2 ====
October 9, Busch Stadium

Team	1	2	3	4	5	6	7	8	9	R	H	E
Atlanta	0	0	2	0	1	0	0	0	0	3	6	0
St. Louis	1	0	0	0	0	1	0	1	1	4	9	1
W: Bruce Sutter (1–0) L: Gene Garber (0–1) SV: None
HRs: ATL – None STL – None

==== Game 3 ====
October 10, Atlanta–Fulton County Stadium

Team	1	2	3	4	5	6	7	8	9	R	H	E
St. Louis	0	4	0	0	1	0	0	0	1	6	12	0
Atlanta	0	0	0	0	0	0	2	0	0	2	6	1
W: Joaquín Andújar (1–0) L: Rick Camp (0–1) SV: Bruce Sutter (1)
HRs: ATL – None STL – Willie McGee (1)

=== World Series ===
In Game 3, rookie outfielder Willie McGee hit two home runs, tying a World Series record for rookies.

NL St. Louis Cardinals (4) vs. AL Milwaukee Brewers (3)

Game	Score	Date	Location	Attendance	Time of Game
1	Brewers – 10, Cardinals – 0	October 12	Busch Stadium (St Louis)	53,723	2:30
2	Brewers – 4, Cardinals – 5	October 13	Busch Stadium (St Louis)	53,723	2:54
3	Cardinals – 6, Brewers – 2	October 15	Milwaukee County Stadium (Milwaukee)	56,556	2:53
4	Cardinals – 5, Brewers – 7	October 16	Milwaukee County Stadium (Milwaukee)	56,560	3:04
5	Cardinals – 4, Brewers – 6	October 17	Milwaukee County Stadium (Milwaukee)	56,562	3:02
6	Brewers – 1, Cardinals – 13	October 19	Busch Stadium (St Louis)	53,723	2:21
7	Brewers – 3, Cardinals – 6	October 20	Busch Stadium (St Louis)	53,723	2:50

== Awards and honors ==
- Darrell Porter, NLCS and World Series Most Valuable Player
- Bruce Sutter, Babe Ruth Award

== Farm system ==
Level	Team	League	Manager
AAA	Louisville Redbirds	American Association	Joe Frazier
AA	Arkansas Travelers	Texas League	Gaylen Pitts and Nick Leyva
A	St. Petersburg Cardinals	Florida State League	Nick Leyva and Gaylen Pitts
A	Springfield Cardinals	Midwest League	Dave Bialas
A	Gastonia Cardinals	South Atlantic League	Lloyd Merritt
A-Short Season	Erie Cardinals	New York–Penn League	Joe Rigoli
Rookie	Johnson City Cardinals	Appalachian League	Rich Hacker
