= 1982 Houston Astros season =

21st season in Major League Baseball for the Houston Astros

1982 Houston Astros
- League: National League
- Division: West
- Ballpark: Astrodome
- City: Houston, Texas
- Record: 77–85 (.475)
- Divisional place: 5th
- Owners: John McMullen
- General managers: Al Rosen
- Managers: Bill Virdon (49–62); Bob Lillis (28–23)
- Television: KRIV
- Radio: KENR (Gene Elston, Dewayne Staats, Larry Dierker)

The 1982 Houston Astros season was the 21st season for the Major League Baseball (MLB) franchise located in Houston, Texas, their 18th as the Astros, 21st in the National League (NL), 14th in the NL West division, and 18th at The Astrodome. The Astros entered the season as second-half division champions, ended in defeat to the Los Angeles Dodgers in the National League Division Series (NLDS), the eventual World Series champions.

On April 6, Nolan Ryan made his first Opening Day start for Houston, who hosted the St. Louis Cardinals but were defeated, 14–3. On July 7, Don Sutton earned his 250th career victory, while, twenty days later, Ryan earned the 200th of his career.

First baseman Ray Knight represented the Astros at the MLB All-Star Game and played for the National League, his second career selection.

The Astros concluded the season with a 77–85 record, in fifth place and 12 games behind the division-champion Atlanta Braves.

== Offseason ==
=== Summary ===
The Astros concluded the 1981 season with an overall record of 61–49 for third-best in the division. As a response to the players' strike, a one-time format with a split regular season was implemented and modified playoffs were introduced. Houston qualified for the second-half division title. In the National League Division Series (NLDS), Houston faced the first-half division-champion Los Angeles Dodgers, but were defeated prior to the Dodgers winning the World Series.

The 1981 Astros' pitching staff led the league in each of earned run average (2.66 ERA), fewest hits (842), fewest home runs (40), shutouts, (Note: Tied with the Dodgers.) and strikeouts (610). The 2.66 ERA set an all-time franchise mark, and the team tied their 1979 counterpart for most team shutouts in franchise history (19). Nolan Ryan posted an ERA of 1.69 to lead MLB, and became the second Astros pitcher to lead the NL.

Former Colt .45s infielder Pete Runnels, a native of Lufkin, Texas, was inducted into the Texas Sports Hall of Fame in 1982. Runnels played in Houston during the 1963 and 1964 campaigns.

=== Transactions ===
- October 23, 1981: Pete Ladd was traded by the Astros to the Milwaukee Brewers for Rickey Keeton.
- December 18, 1981: César Cedeño was traded by the Astros to the Cincinnati Reds for Ray Knight.

== Regular season ==
=== Summary ===
==== April ====
Prior to the start of the season's first game, the Astros were announced as the hosts for the 1986 Major League Baseball All-Star Game.

Opening Day starting lineup
Uniform	Player	Position
21	Terry Puhl	Right fielder
30	Tony Scott	Center fielder
3	Phil Garner	Second baseman
25	José Cruz	Left fielder
14	Alan Ashby	Catcher
22	Ray Knight	Third baseman
18	Art Howe	First baseman
12	Craig Reynolds	Shortstop
34	Nolan Ryan	Pitcher
Venue: Astrodome • Final: St. Louis 14, Houston 3 Sources:

For Opening Day, on April 6, the Astros hosted the St. Louis Cardinals. Nolan Ryan made his first Opening Day start for Houston; however, he took the loss as the Cardinals sent nine men to the plate and scored five runs during the first inning. St. Louis never looked back, pounding out 18 hits and taking the season's inaugural contest, 14–3. This was the first time that Ryan surrendered more than three runs in any game at the Astrodome. Art Howe banged out a sacrifice fly during the bottom of the second inning off Cardinals starter Bob Forsch and swatted a home run in the seventh. Alan Ashby also homered off Forsch in the sixth to account for all of Houston's tallies. Jim Kaat tossed a scoreless ninth inning for St. Louis to become the first pitcher in major league history to appear in 24 seasons. This was the second consecutive Opening Day that the Astros were matched up against that season's eventual World Series champions.

José Cruz smashed his 100th career home run on April 26, a two-run shot off John Martin of the St. Louis Cardinals. Ray Knight slugged a home run of his own, collected three runs batted in (RBI) and was 3-for-4 as Houston triumphed, 6–2. Nolan Ryan (1–4) went the distance, struck out five, and earned his first win of the season Cruz became one 31 Major League players through 1982 to accrue 100 home runs and 200 stolen bases or more during his career. (Note: For combined seasons, from 1900 to 1982, in the regular season, requiring stolen bases ≥ 200 and home runs ≥ 100, sorted by ascending season.)

==== May ====
On May 22, Terry Puhl connected for his first career grand slam, off Neil Allen of the New York Mets tying the score 5–5 during the bottom of the ninth inning. Puhl had three hits total, including a triple, and five RBI. The game proceeded into extra innings, and Allen remained in the game. While batting in the top of the twelfth inning, Allen reached on an error as the go-ahead run scored. Allen next tossed a scoreless bottom of the twelfth inning, retiring José Cruz on a groundout to end the game and preserve a 6–5 Mets win.

On May 26, reliever Frank LaCorte, after having walked the bases loaded to the Montreal Expos, became so furious that he torched his jersey upon returning to the clubhouse. LaCorte considered his jersey number 31 a bad omen, representing the many instances he had fallen behind in the count to the batter. The team later gave him number 27. George Cappuzzello relieved LaCorte, and all three runners scored—first on a sacrifice fly by Tim Raines, then on Tim Wallach's home run, rallying Montreal to a 4–0 victory in 10 innings. For the first nine innings, Charlie Lea had one-hit the Astros, while Don Sutton countered with five-hit shutout ball.

==== Don Sutton's 250th career win ====
During his brief stay as an Astro, right-hander Don Sutton earned his 250th career victory on July 7, 1982, via a 5–1 tally versus the Chicago Cubs. It was his ninth win of the campaign. In support, Phil Garner slugged a two-run home run, and José Cruz drove in two others.

==== July ====
From July 24 to August 14, Dickie Thon manufactured a 21-game hitting streak, which was the fifth in team history of 20 games or longer, and just two games short of Art Howe's then-club record of 23 from May 1 to May 24 of the prior campaign. During the streak, Thon batted .308, pounded eight doubles, three triples, and purloined eight bases, while striking out just twice. Thon's hitting streak tied Pete Rose for longest in the National League on the season, and tied for third longest in baseball behind Rod Carew (25 games), Kent Hrbek (23), and tied with Richie Zisk (21) in the American League (AL). (Note: Longest streak of consecutive games, in 1982, in the regular season, requiring hits ≥ 1, sorted by most games matching criteria.)

==== Nolan Ryan's 200th career win ====
On July 27, Nolan Ryan earned the 200th victory of his career with a five-hit, 3–2 triumph over the Cincinnati Reds. Ryan whiffed 13, issued two bases on balls and earned a solid game score of 82. During the first inning, he picked off Eddie Milner. Meanwhile, Tony Scott doubled, collected an RBI, and swiped two of Houston's four bags. During the bottom of the eighth, Terry Puhl smashed a line drove of reliever Jim Kern, which second baseman Ron Oester slung wildly as Ray Knight charged around third base, ahead of the throw to home plate to score the winning run.

During the month of July, Ryan produced a 4–1 win–loss record (W–L), 1.10 earned run average (ERA), four complete games, and one shutouts in five games. Ryan surrendered, 25 hits surrendered, 13 bases on balls (BB), 0.927 walks plus hits per inning pitched (WHIP), while strikeout out 48.

==== August ====
On August 11, Nolan Ryan hurled his first one-hit complete game as an Astro, the eighth of his career, and lowest-hit effort since his no-hitter on September 26, 1981. Ryan's most recent one-hitter was on July 13, 1979, as a member of the California Angels. Ryan (12–8) walked three and struck out six for a game score of 88, and, at the plate, hit an RBI single and drew a base on balls to lead a 3–0 win over the San Diego Padres. Terry Puhl slashed three hits, while Phil Garner and Ray Knight each logged RBI singles. The only hit Ryan surrendered was a single to center field by Terry Kennedy during the bottom of the fifth inning. Dickie Thon extended his hitting streak to 20 games.

On August 28, knuckleball specialist Joe Niekro (13–9) garnered his 100th career victory as a member of the Astros, leading a 2–0 defeat of the Montreal Expos. He went the distance with a six-hit shutout with four whiffs. In four previous outings on the season with Charlie Lea starting, Montreal had shut out Houston, while the Astros mustered 9 hits over the most recent three. In the fifth inning, Luis Pujols tripled in Art Howe for Houston's first run. In the eighth, a single by Thon, a wild pitch, followed by another single from Phil Garner accounted for the second score. A winner of 58 contests prior to joining Houston, Niekro followed Larry Dierker (137), J. R. Richard (107) and Don Wilson (104) as hurlers to win 100 games for the Astros.

On August 31, Ryan hurled a two-hit shutout of the New York Mets to lead a 4–0 Astros triumph. Ryan took a bid for a sixth no-hitter into the eighth inning, yielding a single to Ron Hodges for the first safety. The only other hit for New York was a single leading off the top of the ninth by Bob Bailor. Ryan retired George Foster on a groundout for the final out to secure the shutout. Ryan struck out nine, issued three base on balls and earned a game score of 89. Tony Scott hit an RBI groundout to score Dickie Thon for the game's first run during the bottom of the first inning. In the top of the seventh, Alan Ashby hit an RBI single, and Danny Heep followed with an RBI double.

During the month of August, Nolan Ryan went 3–0 W–L and 1.98 ERA over 7 starts, with three complete games and two shutouts. Over 54 innings, Ryan yielded 32 hits, 25 BB surrendered a .168 batting average against (BAA), and 1.043 WHIP, with 48 punchouts. Hence, Ryan was recognized as the NL Pitcher of the Month. Ryan succeeded J. R. Richard as the most recent Astro to win the award, who was named in April, 1980. In the months of July and August combined, Ryan posted a 7–1 record, 1.60 ERA, 7 complete games, and 3 shutouts. Ryan surrendered 57 hits and struck out 96 over 95 2/3 innings pitched (IP).

==== September ====
On September 6, Bill Doran made his major league debut. Doran went 0-for-3 in a 4-to-2 defeat to San Diego. During the bottom of the second inning, Doran grounded out in his first plate appearance versus Padres starter Chris Welsh (8–5), who earned a complete game victory. Alan Ashby (10) homered in the bottom of the fourth inning—also scoring José Cruz—to supply all of Houston's offense.

On September 27, switch-hitting catcher Alan Ashby became the 12th National League player—on the 17th occasion—and first Houston Astro to homer from both sides of the plate in the same game. However, it was Ashby's single to right in the top of the eighth which plated José Cruz for the go-ahead tally at 4–3 over the Padres. Two innings earlier, Ashby had homered from the left side off Padres starter John Montefusco to tie it 3-all. In the top of the ninth, from the right side, Ashby took lefty Chris Welsh deep for a three-run bomb for the 7–3 score. Houston batters aggregated 15 hits, led by Ashby and Cruz with three each. Meanwhile, Vern Ruhle (9–13) posted scoreless ball over the final five innings in relief, with four strikeouts to pick up the victory.

==== Performance overview ====
The Astros concluded the 1982 season with an 77–85 (.475) record, for fifth place and 12 games behind the NL West division-champion Atlanta Braves. Hence, the Astros missed the playoffs for the first time since 1979 after having qualified for the first two times in franchise history. It was the just third time since 1969 that Houston had finished more than four games under .500. (Note: Save for the win–loss records, each of the first-place team, and Astros' ranking and games behind in the division were all identical to the 1969 season.)

Dickie Thon collected 10 triples to lead the National League. Thon was the fourth Astros hitter to lead the league in triples, succeeding teammate Craig Reynolds from the year prior.

Nolan Ryan led the major leagues in fewest hits per nine innings surrendered (7.047), the seventh time in club history for an Astros pitcher. Having the led the league the year prior, Ryan joined J. R. Richard as the second Astros pitcher to lead the league in the category multiple times.

However, Ryan also led the major leagues in most walks issued (109) to extend his major-league record for leading the league to an eighth season, and for the second time in the National League. Ryan already held the American League record with six, as a member of the California Angels. This was his second time as member of the Astros.

=== League standings ===
==== National League West ====
NL West
Team	W	L	Pct.	GB	Home	Road
Atlanta Braves	89	73	.549	—	42‍–‍39	47‍–‍34
Los Angeles Dodgers	88	74	.543	1	43‍–‍38	45‍–‍36
San Francisco Giants	87	75	.537	2	45‍–‍36	42‍–‍39
San Diego Padres	81	81	.500	8	43‍–‍38	38‍–‍43
Houston Astros	77	85	.475	12	43‍–‍38	34‍–‍47
Cincinnati Reds	61	101	.377	28	33‍–‍48	28‍–‍53

==== Record versus opponents ====
National League

1982 National League record Sources:
Team	ATL	CHC	CIN	HOU	LAD	MON	NYM	PHI	PIT	SD	SF	STL
Atlanta	—	8–4	14–4	10–8	7–11	5–7	9–3	6–6	4–8	11–7	8–10	7–5
Chicago	4–8	—	6–6	9–3	5–7	6–12	9–9	9–9	9–9	4–8	6–6	6–12
Cincinnati	4–14	6–6	—	7–11	7–11	4–8	7–5	5–7	4–8	6–12	6–12	5–7
Houston	8–10	3–9	11–7	—	7–11	4–8	8–4	7–5	9–3	9–9	5–13	6–6
Los Angeles	11–7	7–5	11–7	11–7	—	8–4	6–6	4–8	5–7	9–9	9–9	7–5
Montreal	7–5	12–6	8–4	8–4	4–8	—	11–7	8–10	7–11	7–5	4–8	10–8
New York	3–9	9–9	5–7	4–8	6–6	7–11	—	7–11	8–10	6–6	4–8	6–12
Philadelphia	6-6	9–9	7–5	5–7	8–4	10–8	11–7	—	9–9	7–5	10–2	7–11
Pittsburgh	8–4	9–9	8–4	3–9	7–5	11–7	10–8	9–9	—	6–6	6–6	7–11
San Diego	7–11	8–4	12–6	9–9	9–9	5–7	6–6	5–7	6–6	—	10–8	4–8
San Francisco	10–8	6–6	12–6	13–5	9–9	8–4	8–4	2–10	6–6	8–10	—	5–7
St. Louis	5–7	12–6	7–5	6–6	5–7	8–10	12–6	11–7	11–7	8–4	7–5	—

=== Notable transactions ===
- June 8, 1982: Joe Pittman was traded by the Astros to the San Diego Padres for Danny Boone.
- August 30, 1982: Don Sutton was traded by the Astros to the Milwaukee Brewers for players to be named later and cash.
- September 3, 1982: The Brewers completed their August 30 trade with the Astros, sending Kevin Bass, Frank DiPino, and Mike Madden to the Astros.

=== Roster ===
1982 Houston Astros
Roster
Pitchers: 31 Danny Boone; 52 George Cappuzzello; 46 Frank DiPino; 39 Bob Knepper; 27,31 Frank LaCorte; 51 Mike LaCoss; 17 Randy Moffit; 36 Joe Niekro; 44 Gordie Pladson; 42 Bert Roberge; 47 Mark Ross; 48 Vern Ruhle; 34 Nolan Ryan; 35 Joe Sambito; 45 Dave Smith; 20 Don Sutton	Catchers: 14 Alan Ashby; 11 Alan Knicely; 6 Luis Pujols; Infielders: 19 Bill Doran; 23 Kiko Garcia; 3 Phil Garner; 18 Art Howe; 22 Ray Knight; 9 Joe Pittman; 12 Craig Reynolds; 16 Harry Spilman; 10 Dickie Thon	Outfielders: 8 Kevin Bass; 25 José Cruz; 24 Danny Heep; 26 Scott Loucks; 21 Terry Puhl; 37 Larry Ray; 30 Tony Scott; 38 Tim Tolman; 29 Denny Walling; Other batters: 15 Mike Ivie	Manager: 5 Bob Lillis; 7 Bill Virdon; Coaches: 4 Deacon Jones; 43 Don Leppert; 5 Bob Lillis; 2 Mel Wright

== Player stats ==
=== Batting ===
==== Starters by position ====
Note: Pos = Position; G = Games played; AB = At bats; H = Hits; Avg. = Batting average; HR = Home runs; RBI = Runs batted in

Pos	Player	G	AB	H	Avg.	HR	RBI
C	Alan Ashby	100	339	87	.257	12	49
1B	Ray Knight	158	609	161	.274	6	70
2B	Phil Garner	155	588	161	.274	13	83
SS	Dickie Thon	136	496	137	.276	3	36
3B	Art Howe	110	365	87	.238	5	38
LF	José Cruz	155	570	157	.275	9	68
CF	Tony Scott	132	460	110	.239	1	29
RF	Terry Puhl	145	507	133	.262	8	50

==== Other batters ====
Note: G = Games played; AB = At bats; H = Hits; Avg. = Batting average; HR = Home runs; RBI = Runs batted in

Player	G	AB	H	Avg.	HR	RBI
Danny Heep	85	198	47	.237	4	22
Luis Pujols	65	176	35	.199	4	15
Denny Walling	85	146	30	.205	1	14
Alan Knicely	59	133	25	.188	2	12
Craig Reynolds	54	118	30	.254	1	7
Bill Doran	26	97	27	.278	0	6
Kiko Garcia	34	76	16	.211	1	5
Harry Spilman	38	61	17	.279	3	11
Scott Loucks	44	49	11	.224	0	3
Tim Tolman	15	26	5	.192	1	3
Kevin Bass	12	24	1	.042	0	1
Joe Pittman	15	10	2	.200	0	0
Larry Ray	5	6	1	.167	0	1
Mike Ivie	7	6	2	.333	0	0

=== Pitching ===
==== Starting pitchers ====
Note: G = Games pitched; IP = Innings pitched; W = Wins; L = Losses; ERA = Earned run average; SO = Strikeouts

Player	G	IP	W	L	ERA	SO
Joe Niekro	35	270.0	17	12	2.47	130
Nolan Ryan	35	250.1	16	12	3.16	245
Don Sutton	27	195.0	13	8	3.00	139
Bob Knepper	33	180.0	5	15	4.45	108
Vern Ruhle	31	149.0	9	13	3.93	56
Frank DiPino	6	28.1	2	2	6.04	25

==== Other pitchers ====
Note: G = Games pitched; IP = Innings pitched; W = Wins; L = Losses; ERA = Earned run average; SO = Strikeouts

Player	G	IP	W	L	ERA	SO
Mike LaCoss	41	115.0	6	6	2.90	51

==== Relief pitchers ====
Note: G = Games pitched; W = Wins; L = Losses; SV = Saves; ERA = Earned run average; SO = Strikeouts

Player	G	W	L	SV	ERA	SO
Dave Smith	49	5	4	11	3.84	28
Frank LaCorte	55	1	5	7	4.48	51
Randy Moffit	30	2	4	3	3.02	20
Bert Roberge	22	1	2	3	4.21	18
George Cappuzzello	17	0	1	0	2.79	13
Danny Boone	10	0	1	1	3.55	4
Joe Sambito	9	0	0	4	0.71	7
Mark Ross	4	0	0	0	1.50	4
Gordie Pladson	2	0	0	0	54.00	0

== Awards and achievements ==
=== Grand slam ===
No.	Date	Astros batter	Venue	Inning	Pitcher	Opposing team	Box
1	May 22	Terry Puhl (Note: 1st MLB grand slam)	Astrodome	9 (Note: Tied score or took lead)	Neil Allen	New York Mets	

=== No-hit bid ===
Date	Starting pitcher (IP)	Relief pitcher(s) (IP)	No-hit IP	GS	Catcher	Batter	Final	Opponent	Box
August 31, 1982	Nolan Ryan (9)	—	7	89	Alan Ashby	Ron Hodges	4–0	New York Mets	
Note: Includes those games started with 7 or more no-hit innings.

=== Career honors ===
Career honors received in 1982
Honor / mention received	Individual	Role	Uni.	Start	Finish	ASG	Bio. / Games	Summ.
Texas Sports Hall of Fame inductee	Pete Runnels	Infielder	3	1963	1964	—	148 games • Player bio	
Ref.:

=== Awards ===
1982 Houston Astros award winners
Name of award		Recipient	Ref.
Houston Astros Most Valuable Player Award (MVP)		Ray Knight	
MLB All-Star Game	Reserve infielder	Ray Knight	
National League (NL) Pitcher of the Month	August	Nolan Ryan	

Other awards results

Name of award	Voting recipient(s) (Team)	Ref.
NL Most Valuable Player	1st—Murphy (ATL) • 25th—Knight (HOU)	

=== League leaders ===
Batting leaders

- Triples: Dickie Thon (10)

Pitching leaders

- Bases on balls allowed: Nolan Ryan (109)
- Hit batsmen: Nolan Ryan (8)
- Hits per nine innings pitched: Nolan Ryan (7.0)
- Wild pitches: Joe Niekro (19)

=== Milestones ===
==== Major League debuts ====
Player—Appeared at position

- Bill Doran, second baseman
Date and opponent

- September 6 vs SDP
Box

Also:

== Minor league system ==
Level	Team	League	Manager
AAA	Tucson Toros	Pacific Coast League	Jimmy Johnson
AA	Columbus Astros	Southern League	Matt Galante
A	Daytona Beach Astros	Florida State League	Eric Swanson
A	Asheville Tourists	South Atlantic League	Dave Cripe
A-Short Season	Auburn Astros	New York–Penn League	Bob Hartsfield
Rookie	GCL Astros	Gulf Coast League	José Tartabull

== See also ==
- List of Major League Baseball annual triples leaders
- List of Major League Baseball career wins leaders
- List of Major League Baseball individual streaks
- List of Major League Baseball titles leaders
