= 1982 New York Mets season =

1982 New York Mets
- League: National League
- Division: East
- Ballpark: Shea Stadium
- City: New York
- Record: 65–97 (.401)
- Divisional place: 6th
- Owners: Nelson Doubleday, Jr.
- General manager: Frank Cashen
- Manager: George Bamberger
- Television: WOR-TV/SportsChannel New York (Ralph Kiner, Lorn Brown)
- Radio: WMCA (Bob Murphy, Steve LaMar)

The 1982 New York Mets season was the 21st regular season for the Mets. They went 65–97 and finished in sixth place in the National League East, twenty-seven games behind the first place St. Louis Cardinals. They were managed by George Bamberger. They played home games at Shea Stadium.

Beginning that year, to supplement gameday broadcasts for cable viewers, Mets game broadcasts were simulcast on SportsChannel NY in addition to the usual WOR-TV telecast.

== Offseason ==
- December 11, 1981: Doug Flynn and Dan Boitano were traded by the Mets to the Texas Rangers for Jim Kern.
- October 12, 1981: Mike Marshall was released by the New York Mets.
- February 10, 1982: Alex Treviño, Jim Kern, and Greg Harris were traded by the Mets to the Cincinnati Reds for George Foster.

== Regular season ==
=== Season standings ===
NL East
Team	W	L	Pct.	GB	Home	Road
St. Louis Cardinals	92	70	.568	—	46‍–‍35	46‍–‍35
Philadelphia Phillies	89	73	.549	3	51‍–‍30	38‍–‍43
Montreal Expos	86	76	.531	6	40‍–‍41	46‍–‍35
Pittsburgh Pirates	84	78	.519	8	42‍–‍39	42‍–‍39
Chicago Cubs	73	89	.451	19	38‍–‍43	35‍–‍46
New York Mets	65	97	.401	27	33‍–‍48	32‍–‍49

=== Record vs. opponents ===
1982 National League record Sources:
Team	ATL	CHC	CIN	HOU	LAD	MON	NYM	PHI	PIT	SD	SF	STL
Atlanta	—	8–4	14–4	10–8	7–11	5–7	9–3	6–6	4–8	11–7	8–10	7–5
Chicago	4–8	—	6–6	9–3	5–7	6–12	9–9	9–9	9–9	4–8	6–6	6–12
Cincinnati	4–14	6–6	—	7–11	7–11	4–8	7–5	5–7	4–8	6–12	6–12	5–7
Houston	8–10	3–9	11–7	—	7–11	4–8	8–4	7–5	9–3	9–9	5–13	6–6
Los Angeles	11–7	7–5	11–7	11–7	—	8–4	6–6	4–8	5–7	9–9	9–9	7–5
Montreal	7–5	12–6	8–4	8–4	4–8	—	11–7	8–10	7–11	7–5	4–8	10–8
New York	3–9	9–9	5–7	4–8	6–6	7–11	—	7–11	8–10	6–6	4–8	6–12
Philadelphia	6-6	9–9	7–5	5–7	8–4	10–8	11–7	—	9–9	7–5	10–2	7–11
Pittsburgh	8–4	9–9	8–4	3–9	7–5	11–7	10–8	9–9	—	6–6	6–6	7–11
San Diego	7–11	8–4	12–6	9–9	9–9	5–7	6–6	5–7	6–6	—	10–8	4–8
San Francisco	10–8	6–6	12–6	13–5	9–9	8–4	8–4	2–10	6–6	8–10	—	5–7
St. Louis	5–7	12–6	7–5	6–6	5–7	8–10	12–6	11–7	11–7	8–4	7–5	—

=== Notable transactions ===
- April 1, 1982: Lee Mazzilli was traded by the Mets to the Texas Rangers for Ron Darling and Walt Terrell.
- April 5, 1982: Mike Cubbage was released by the Mets.
- May 10, 1982: Manuel Lee was signed as an amateur free agent by the Mets.
- May 21, 1982: Rick Sweet was purchased from the Mets by the Seattle Mariners.
- June 7, 1982: 1982 Major League Baseball draft
  - Dwight Gooden was drafted by the Mets in the 1st round (5th pick). Player signed June 10, 1982.
  - Tracy Jones was drafted by the Mets in the 4th round.
  - Randy Myers was drafted by the Mets in the 1st round (9th pick) of the Secondary Phase. Player signed June 8, 1982.
- August 4, 1982: Joel Youngblood was traded by the Mets to the Montreal Expos for a player to be named later. The Expos completed the trade by sending Tom Gorman to the Mets on August 16.

=== Joel Youngblood ===
On August 4, 1982, Youngblood became the first player in history to get hits for two different teams in two different cities on the same day. Youngblood had driven in the winning run for the Mets in an afternoon game at Wrigley Field against the Chicago Cubs, and then singled in a night game for the Montreal Expos in Philadelphia after he had been traded. The two pitchers he hit safely against, Ferguson Jenkins of the Cubs and Steve Carlton of the Philadelphia Phillies, are both in the Baseball Hall of Fame.

=== Roster ===
1982 New York Mets
Roster
Pitchers: 13 Neil Allen; 32 Carlos Diaz; 33 Pete Falcone; 45 Brent Gaff; 29 Tom Gorman; 32 Tom Hausman; 28 Scott Holman; 35 Randy Jones; 43 Terry Leach; 36 Ed Lynch; 47 Jesse Orosco; 20 Rick Ownbey; 25 Charlie Puleo; 30 Mike Scott; 39 Doug Sisk; 27 Craig Swan; 49 Walt Terrell; 40 Pat Zachry	Catchers: 9 Bruce Bochy; 42 Ron Hodges; 8 Ronn Reynolds; 12 John Stearns; Infielders: 6 Wally Backman; 4 Bob Bailor; 7 Hubie Brooks; 19 Ron Gardenhire; 23 Brian Giles; 22 Mike Jorgensen; 26 Dave Kingman; 2 Phil Mankowski; 11 Tom Veryzer	Outfielders: 15 George Foster; 5 Mike Howard; 21 Gary Rajsich; 10 Rusty Staub; 34 Rusty Tillman; 17 Ellis Valentine; 1 Mookie Wilson; 18 Joel Youngblood; Other batters: 8 Rick Sweet	Manager: 31 George Bamberger; Coaches: 51 Jim Frey; 53 Bud Harrelson; 55 Frank Howard; 56 Bill Monbouquette

== Player stats ==
=== Batting ===
==== Starters by position ====
Note: Pos = Position; G = Games played; AB = At bats; H = Hits; Avg. = Batting average; HR = Home runs; RBI = Runs batted in

Pos	Player	G	AB	H	Avg.	HR	RBI
C	John Stearns	98	352	103	.293	4	28
1B	Dave Kingman	149	535	109	.204	37	99
2B	Wally Backman	96	261	71	.272	3	22
SS	Ron Gardenhire	141	384	92	.240	3	33
3B	Hubie Brooks	126	457	114	.249	2	40
LF	George Foster	151	550	136	.247	13	70
CF	Mookie Wilson	159	639	178	.279	5	55
RF	Ellis Valentine	111	337	97	.288	8	48

==== Other batters ====
Note: G = Games played; AB = At bats; H = Hits; Avg. = Batting average; HR = Home runs; RBI = Runs batted in

Player	G	AB	H	Avg.	HR	RBI
Bob Bailor	110	376	104	.277	0	31
Ron Hodges	80	228	56	.246	5	27
Rusty Staub	112	219	53	.242	3	37
Joel Youngblood	80	202	52	.257	3	21
Gary Rajsich	80	162	42	.259	2	12
Brian Giles	45	138	29	.210	3	10
Mike Jorgensen	120	114	29	.254	2	14
Tom Veryzer	40	54	18	.333	0	4
Bruce Bochy	17	49	15	.306	2	8
Mike Howard	33	39	7	.179	1	3
Phil Mankowski	13	35	8	.229	0	4
Rusty Tillman	12	13	2	.154	0	0
Ronn Reynolds	2	4	0	.000	0	0
Rick Sweet	3	3	1	.333	0	0

=== Pitching ===
==== Starting pitchers ====
Note: G = Games pitched; IP = Innings pitched; W = Wins; L = Losses; ERA = Earned run average; SO = Strikeouts

Player	G	IP	W	L	ERA	SO
Rick Ownbey	8	50.1	1	2	3.75	28
Scott Holman	4	26.2	2	1	2.36	11
Walt Terrell	3	21.0	0	3	3.43	8

==== Other pitchers ====
Note: G = Games pitched; IP = Innings pitched; W = Wins; L = Losses; ERA = Earned run average; SO = Strikeouts

Player	G	IP	W	L	ERA	SO
Pete Falcone	40	171.0	8	10	3.84	101
Charlie Puleo	36	171.0	9	9	4.47	98
Craig Swan	37	166.1	11	7	3.35	67
Mike Scott	37	147.0	7	13	5.14	63
Ed Lynch	43	139.1	4	8	3.55	51
Pat Zachry	36	137.2	6	9	4.05	69
Randy Jones	28	107.2	7	10	4.60	44
Brent Gaff	7	31.2	0	3	4.55	14
Tom Gorman	3	9.1	0	1	0.96	7

==== Relief pitchers ====
Note: G = Games pitched; W = Wins; L = Losses; SV = Saves; ERA = Earned run average; SO = Strikeouts

Player	G	W	L	SV	ERA	SO
Neil Allen	50	3	7	19	3.06	59
Jesse Orosco	54	4	10	4	2.72	89
Terry Leach	21	2	1	3	4.17	30
Tom Hausman	21	1	2	0	4.42	16
Doug Sisk	8	0	1	1	1.04	4
Carlos Diaz	4	0	0	0	0.00	0

== Farm system ==
Level	Team	League	Manager
AAA	Tidewater Tides	International League	Jack Aker
AA	Jackson Mets	Texas League	Gene Dusan
A	Lynchburg Mets	Carolina League	Dan Monzon
A	Shelby Mets	South Atlantic League	Rich Miller
A-Short Season	Little Falls Mets	New York–Penn League	Sam Perlozzo
Rookie	Kingsport Mets	Appalachian League	Ed Olsen

LEAGUE CHAMPIONS: Tidewater
