= 1982 Los Angeles Dodgers season =

1982 Los Angeles Dodgers
- League: National League
- Division: West
- Ballpark: Dodger Stadium
- City: Los Angeles
- Record: 88–74 (.543)
- Divisional place: 2nd
- Owners: Peter O'Malley
- General managers: Al Campanis
- Managers: Tommy Lasorda
- Television: KTTV (11); Vin Scully, Jerry Doggett, Ross Porter; ONTV; Geoff Witcher, Al Downing
- Radio: KABC; Vin Scully, Jerry Doggett, Ross Porter; KTNQ; Jaime Jarrín, René Cárdenas

The 1982 Los Angeles Dodgers season was the 93rd season for the Los Angeles Dodgers franchise in Major League Baseball (MLB), their 25th season in Los Angeles, California, and their 21st season playing their home games at Dodger Stadium. The Dodgers entered the season as the defending World Series champions. They would remain in contention until the final day of the regular season, when their archrivals, the San Francisco Giants, would knock them out of the National League West race, in a season that saw the Atlanta Braves reach the playoffs instead. The Dodgers finished second in the National League West at 88–74, becoming the fifth team since 1969 to miss the playoffs one year after winning the World Series. This was the final season for longtime Dodger cornerstones Steve Garvey and Ron Cey, who would move on to new teams next season. The Dodgers did welcome new second baseman Steve Sax, who won the Rookie of the Year Award.

== Offseason ==
- December 9, 1981: Acquired Jorge Orta, Larry White and Jack Fimple from the Cleveland Indians for Rick Sutcliffe and Jack Perconte.
- December 11, 1981: Mark Belanger was signed as a free agent.
- January 6, 1982: Acquired Paul Voigt (minors) and Scotti Madison from the Minnesota Twins for Bobby Castillo and Bobby Mitchell.
- February 8, 1982: Acquired Lance Hudson (minors) from the Oakland Athletics for Davey Lopes.
- March 30, 1982: Acquired Bert Geiger and Cecil Espy from the Chicago White Sox for Rudy Law.

== Regular season ==
=== Season standings ===
NL West
Team	W	L	Pct.	GB	Home	Road
Atlanta Braves	89	73	.549	—	42‍–‍39	47‍–‍34
Los Angeles Dodgers	88	74	.543	1	43‍–‍38	45‍–‍36
San Francisco Giants	87	75	.537	2	45‍–‍36	42‍–‍39
San Diego Padres	81	81	.500	8	43‍–‍38	38‍–‍43
Houston Astros	77	85	.475	12	43‍–‍38	34‍–‍47
Cincinnati Reds	61	101	.377	28	33‍–‍48	28‍–‍53

=== Record vs. opponents ===
1982 National League record Sources:
Team	ATL	CHC	CIN	HOU	LAD	MON	NYM	PHI	PIT	SD	SF	STL
Atlanta	—	8–4	14–4	10–8	7–11	5–7	9–3	6–6	4–8	11–7	8–10	7–5
Chicago	4–8	—	6–6	9–3	5–7	6–12	9–9	9–9	9–9	4–8	6–6	6–12
Cincinnati	4–14	6–6	—	7–11	7–11	4–8	7–5	5–7	4–8	6–12	6–12	5–7
Houston	8–10	3–9	11–7	—	7–11	4–8	8–4	7–5	9–3	9–9	5–13	6–6
Los Angeles	11–7	7–5	11–7	11–7	—	8–4	6–6	4–8	5–7	9–9	9–9	7–5
Montreal	7–5	12–6	8–4	8–4	4–8	—	11–7	8–10	7–11	7–5	4–8	10–8
New York	3–9	9–9	5–7	4–8	6–6	7–11	—	7–11	8–10	6–6	4–8	6–12
Philadelphia	6-6	9–9	7–5	5–7	8–4	10–8	11–7	—	9–9	7–5	10–2	7–11
Pittsburgh	8–4	9–9	8–4	3–9	7–5	11–7	10–8	9–9	—	6–6	6–6	7–11
San Diego	7–11	8–4	12–6	9–9	9–9	5–7	6–6	5–7	6–6	—	10–8	4–8
San Francisco	10–8	6–6	12–6	13–5	9–9	8–4	8–4	2–10	6–6	8–10	—	5–7
St. Louis	5–7	12–6	7–5	6–6	5–7	8–10	12–6	11–7	11–7	8–4	7–5	—

=== Opening day lineup ===
Opening Day starters
Name	Position
Steve Sax	Second baseman
Ken Landreaux	Center fielder
Dusty Baker	Left fielder
Steve Garvey	First baseman
Ron Cey	Third baseman
Pedro Guerrero	Right fielder
Steve Yeager	Catcher
Bill Russell	Shortstop
Jerry Reuss	Starting pitcher

=== Notable transactions ===
- April 28, 1982: Acquired Jose Morales from the Baltimore Orioles for Leo Hernández
- October 15, 1982: Sold Ted Power to the Cincinnati Reds

=== Roster ===
1982 Los Angeles Dodgers
Roster
Pitchers: 27 Joe Beckwith; 51 Terry Forster; 38 Dave Goltz; 46 Burt Hooton; 57 Steve Howe; 49 Tom Niedenfuer; 26 Alejandro Peña; 55 Ted Power; 41 Jerry Reuss; 45 Vicente Romo; 36 Steve Shirley; 48 Dave Stewart; 34 Fernando Valenzuela; 35 Bob Welch; 37 Ricky Wright	Catchers: 9 Don Crow; 14 Mike Scioscia; 7 Steve Yeager; Infielders: 8 Mark Belanger; 17 Greg Brock; 10 Ron Cey; 6 Steve Garvey; 18 Bill Russell; 3 Steve Sax; 37 Alex Taveras	Outfielders: 12 Dusty Baker; 22 Mark Bradley; 28 Pedro Guerrero; 44 Ken Landreaux; 20 Candy Maldonado; 5 Mike Marshall; 16 Rick Monday; 31 Jorge Orta; 40 Ron Roenicke; 23 Dave Sax; 30 Derrel Thomas; Other batters: 21 Jay Johnstone; 43 José Morales; 11 Manny Mota	Manager: 2 Tommy Lasorda; Coaches: 54 Monty Basgall; 58 Mark Cresse; 11 Manny Mota; 33 Danny Ozark; 29 Ron Perranoski

== Player stats ==
=== Batting ===
==== Starters by position ====
Note: Pos = Position; G = Games played; AB = At bats; H = Hits; Avg. = Batting average; HR = Home runs; RBI = Runs batted in

Pos	Player	G	AB	H	Avg.	HR	RBI
C	Mike Scioscia	129	365	80	.219	5	38
1B	Steve Garvey	162	625	176	.282	16	86
2B	Steve Sax	150	638	180	.282	4	47
SS	Bill Russell	153	497	136	.274	3	46
3B	Ron Cey	150	556	141	.254	24	79
LF	Dusty Baker	147	570	171	.300	23	88
CF	Ken Landreaux	129	461	131	.284	7	50
RF	Pedro Guerrero	150	575	175	.304	32	100

==== Other batters ====
Note: G = Games played; AB = At bats; H = Hits; Avg. = Batting average; HR = Home runs; RBI = Runs batted in

Player	G	AB	H	Avg.	HR	RBI
Rick Monday	104	210	54	.257	11	42
Steve Yeager	82	196	48	.245	2	18
Ron Roenicke	109	143	37	.259	1	12
Jorge Orta	86	115	25	.217	2	8
Derrel Thomas	66	98	26	.265	0	2
Mike Marshall	49	95	23	.242	5	9
Mark Belanger	54	50	12	.240	0	4
José Morales	35	30	9	.300	1	8
Greg Brock	18	17	2	.118	0	1
Jay Johnstone	21	13	1	.077	0	2
Candy Maldonado	6	4	0	.000	0	0
Don Crow	4	4	0	.000	0	0
Alex Taveras	11	3	1	.333	0	2
Mark Bradley	8	3	1	.333	0	0
Dave Sax	2	2	0	.000	0	0
Manny Mota	1	1	0	.000	0	0

=== Pitching ===
==== Starting pitchers ====
Note: G = Games pitched; IP = Innings pitched; W = Wins; L = Losses; ERA = Earned run average; SO = Strikeouts

Player	G	IP	W	L	ERA	SO
Fernando Valenzuela	37	285.0	19	13	2.87	199
Jerry Reuss	39	254.2	18	11	3.11	138
Bob Welch	36	235.2	16	11	3.36	176
Burt Hooton	21	120.2	4	7	4.03	51

==== Other pitchers ====
Note: G = Games pitched; IP = Innings pitched; W = Wins; L = Losses; ERA = Earned run average; SO = Strikeouts

Player	G	IP	W	L	ERA	SO
Dave Stewart	45	146.1	9	8	3.81	80
Vicente Romo	15	35.2	1	2	3.03	24
Ted Power	12	33.2	1	1	6.68	15
Ricky Wright	14	32.2	2	1	3.03	24
Dave Goltz	2	3.2	0	1	4.91	3

==== Relief pitchers ====
Note: G = Games pitched; W = Wins; L = Losses; SV = Saves; ERA = Earned run average; SO = Strikeouts

Player	G	W	L	SV	ERA	SO
Steve Howe	66	7	5	13	2.08	49
Terry Forster	56	5	6	3	3.04	52
Tom Niedenfuer	55	3	4	9	2.71	60
Alejandro Peña	29	0	2	0	4.79	20
Joe Beckwith	19	2	1	1	2.70	33
Steve Shirley	11	1	1	0	4.26	8

== Awards and honors ==
- 1982 Major League Baseball All-Star Game
  - Steve Howe reserve
  - Dusty Baker reserve
  - Steve Sax reserve
  - Fernando Valenzuela reserve
- National League Rookie of the Year
  - Steve Sax
- Baseball Digest Rookie All-Star
  - Steve Sax
- Silver Slugger Award
  - Pedro Guerrero
- TSN National League All-Star
  - Pedro Guerrero
- NL Pitcher of the Month
  - Steve Howe (June 1982)
- NL Player of the Week
  - Jerry Reuss (June 14–20)
  - Pedro Guerrero (Aug. 23–29)
  - Dusty Baker (Sep. 6–12)

== Farm system ==
Level	Team	League	Manager
**AAA**	**Albuquerque Dukes**	**Pacific Coast League**	**Del Crandall**
AA	San Antonio Dodgers	Texas League	Don LeJohn
High A	Lodi Dodgers	California League	Rick Ollar
High A	Vero Beach Dodgers	Florida State League	Terry Collins
Rookie	Lethbridge Dodgers	Pioneer League	Gary LaRocque

Teams in BOLD won League Championships

== Major League Baseball draft ==
The Dodgers drafted 32 players in the June draft and 12 in the January draft. Of those, only four players would eventually play in the Major Leagues.

The first selection in the June draft was first baseman Franklin Stubbs of Virginia Tech. He would spend 10 seasons in the Majors, including 6 with the Dodgers but only hit .232 during that span.

1982 draft picks

=== January draft ===
Round	Name	Position	School	Signed	Career span	Highest level
1	Michael Kolb	RHP	Sacramento City College	Yes	1982–1983	Rookie
2	William Wilson	LHP	San Jacinto College	No; Cardinals-1984	1984	Rookie
3	Mike Kolovitz	RHP	Triton College	No; Mariners-1987	1985–1988	A
4	Joey Aragon	SS	Citrus College	No; Twins-1984	1984–1988	AA
5	Jerald Phillips	C	Taft College	No		
6	Michael Pinckard	RHP	Cerritos College	Yes	1982	Rookie
7	Bill Geivett	3B	Sacramento City College	No; Angels-1985	1985–1988	AA
8	Riley Epps	C	McLennan Community College	No; Rangers-1984	1984–1986	A
9	Gregory Wallace	C	Coastal Bend College	No	1986	A

==== January secondary phase ====
Round	Name	Position	School	Signed	Career span	Highest level
1	Henry Gatewood	C	Sacramento City College	Yes	1982–1988	AA
2	Derril Lewis	LHP	San Bernardino Valley College	No		
3	Bart Elbin	RHP	Louisburg College	No		

=== June draft ===
Round	Name	Position	School	Signed	Career span	Highest level
1	Franklin Stubbs	1B	Virginia Polytechnic Institute and State University	Yes	1982–1995	**MLB**
2	Richard Flores	SS	Coachella Valley High School	Yes	1982–1985	A
3	Ken Howell	RHP	Tuskegee University	Yes	1982–1994	**MLB**
4	Ronald McCormack	RHP	Liberty High School	No; Kansas City Royals-1983	1983–1987	A
5	Bill White	1B	The Citadel	Yes	1982–1985	AA
6	Brian Innis	RHP	University of Illinois at Urbana–Champaign	Yes	1982–1985	AA
7	Timothy Hill	OF	Elk Grove High School	Yes	1982–1985	A
8	Joe Vavra	SS	University of Wisconsin–Stout	Yes	1982–1986	AAA
9	Richard Jenings	3B	Fenwick High School	No		
10	Ronald Burns	RHP	Eastern Washington University	Yes	1982–1983	A
11	John Diehl	OF	Shippensburg University of Pennsylvania	Yes	1982–1983	A
12	Steven Gehrke	RHP	University of Nebraska–Lincoln	No; Giants-1983	1983	Rookie
13	Reggie Williams	OF	Southern University and A&M College	Yes	1982–1991	**MLB**
14	Gary Newsom	2B	Georgia Institute of Technology	Yes	1982–1987	AAA
15	Brian Piper	RHP	University of Texas at El Paso	Yes	1982–1985	AA
16	Mark Mangione	SS	University of Kentucky	Yes	1982	Rookie
17	Richard Medina	LHP	Lewis–Clark State College	No; Orioles-1983	1983	A-
18	Gregory Clark	OF		Yes	1982	Rookie
19	Tim Meeks	RHP	Santa Rosa Junior College	Yes	1982–1991	AAA
20	Bill Scudder	RHP	San Francisco State University	Yes	1982–1985	AAA
21	Edward Williams	2B	California State University, Los Angeles	Yes	1982–1984	A
22	Jerald Cain	OF	Zion-Benton Township High School	Yes	1982–1984	A
23	Michael Gentle	LHP	University of North Alabama	Yes	1982–1985	A
24	Kurt Beamesderfer	C	Troy High School	No; Orioles-1984	1984–1987	AA
25	Joseph Wesley	3B	Silver Creek High School	Yes	1982–1984	A-
26	Stan Van Muyden	RHP	Elk Grove High School	No		
27	Gordon Hershiser	RHP	Wylie E. Groves High School	No; Dodgers-1987	1987–1990	AA
28	Kirk Vucsko	RHP	Lewis University	Yes	1982	A
29	Jeff Hamilton	SS	Flint Carman High School	Yes	1983–1992	**MLB**

==== June secondary phase ====
Round	Name	Position	School	Signed	Career span	Highest level
1	Don Smith	RHP	Arizona State University	Yes	1982–1985	AAA
2	Matt Rowe	RHP	College of Marin	No; Braves-1984	1984–1986	A
3	Jim O'Dell	OF	Lewis–Clark State College	No; Astros-1983	1983–1988	AA
