= Don Crow =

American baseball player (born 1958)

- Catcher
- Born: August 18, 1958 (age 67); Yakima, Washington, U.S.
- Batted: Right Threw: Right

MLB debut
- July 25, 1982, for the Los Angeles Dodgers

Last MLB appearance
- August 1, 1982, for the Los Angeles Dodgers

MLB statistics
- Batting average: .000
- Games played: 4
- At bats: 4
- Stats at Baseball Reference

Teams
- Los Angeles Dodgers (1982)

Don Crow
Medal record

Baseball

Representing the United States

Amateur World Series
Silver medal – second place	1978 Italy	Team

Donald Leroy Crow (born August 18, 1958) is an American former catcher in Major League Baseball. He played in four games for the Los Angeles Dodgers during the 1982 season, recording four at-bats without getting a hit.

Crow attended Washington State University, where he played college baseball for the Cougars from 1977–1979.
