= Larry Ray (baseball) =

American baseball player (1958–2023)

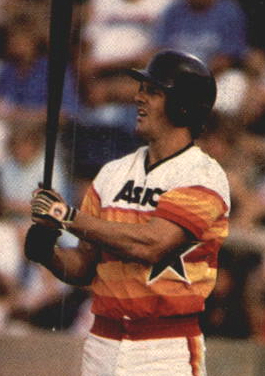
- Ray with the Columbus Astros c. 1986
- Pinch hitter, right fielder
- Born: March 11, 1958; Madison, Indiana, U.S.
- Died: July 22, 2023 (aged 65); Double Springs, Alabama, U.S.
- Batted: Left Threw: Right

MLB debut
- September 10, 1982, for the Houston Astros

Last MLB appearance
- October 2, 1982, for the Houston Astros

MLB statistics
- Batting average: .167
- Home runs: 0
- Runs batted in: 1
- Stats at Baseball Reference

Teams
- Houston Astros (1982)

Larry Dale Ray (March 11, 1958 – July 22, 2023) was an American Major League Baseball right fielder. Drafted by the Astros in the 4th round of the 1979 amateur draft, Ray played for the Houston Astros in the 1982 season. In five games, Ray had one hit in six at-bats, with one RBI.

Ray died unexpectedly while on a lake trip with friends in Double Springs, Alabama, on July 22, 2023. He was 65.
