= Alejandro Sánchez (baseball) =

Dominican baseball player (born 1959)

Alejandro Sanchez
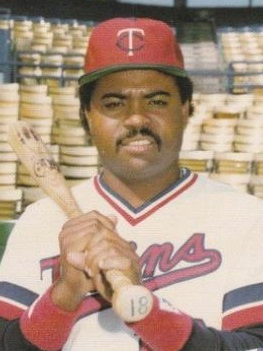
- Outfielder
- Born: February 14, 1959 (age 66); San Pedro de Macorís, Dominican Republic
- Batted: Right Threw: Right

MLB debut
- September 6, 1982, for the Philadelphia Phillies

Last MLB appearance
- May 16, 1987, for the Oakland Athletics

MLB statistics
- Batting average: .229
- Home runs: 8
- Runs batted in: 21
- Stats at Baseball Reference

Teams
- Philadelphia Phillies (1982–1983); San Francisco Giants (1984); Detroit Tigers (1985); Minnesota Twins (1986); Oakland Athletics (1987)

Alejandro Sánchez Pimentel (born February 14, 1959) is a Dominican former professional baseball outfielder. He played during six Major League Baseball (MLB) seasons for the Philadelphia Phillies, San Francisco Giants, Detroit Tigers, Minnesota Twins, and Oakland Athletics. He played his first professional season in American baseball with Philadelphia's Rookie League Helena Phillies in 1978, and his last with the Oakland's Triple-A club, the Tacoma Tigers, in 1988.
