= Steve Shirley (baseball) =

American baseball player and manager (born 1956)

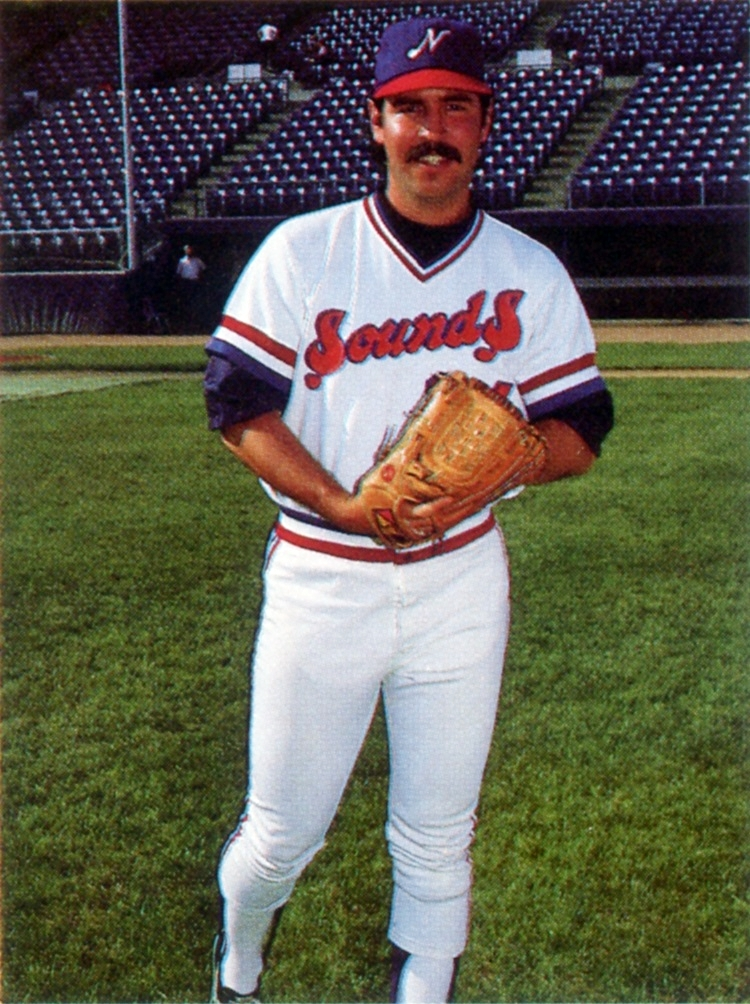
- Shirley with the Nashville Sounds in 1985

Sussex County Miners – No. 26
- Pitcher / Manager
- Born: October 12, 1956 (age 69); San Francisco, California, U.S.
- Batted: Left Threw: Left

Professional debut
- MLB: June 21, 1982, for the Los Angeles Dodgers
- NPB: April 9, 1983, for the Lotte Orions

Last appearance
- MLB: July 30, 1982, for the Los Angeles Dodgers
- NPB: August 23, 1984, for the Lotte Orions

MLB statistics
- Win–loss record: 1–1
- Earned run average: 4.26
- Strikeouts: 8

NPB statistics
- Win–loss record: 5–7
- Earned run average: 4.17
- Strikeouts: 80
- Stats at Baseball Reference

Teams
- Los Angeles Dodgers (1982); Lotte Orions (1983–1984)

Steven Brian Shirley (born October 12, 1956) is an American former pitcher in Major League Baseball. He pitched in 11 games for the Los Angeles Dodgers during the 1982 baseball season. He also pitched two seasons in Japan, 1983 and 1984, for the Lotte Orions. He was manager of the Sioux Falls Canaries from 2006 to 2014, winning the league championship in 2008. He then was hired as manager of the Sussex County Miners.
