= 1982 Montreal Expos season =

1982 Montreal Expos
- League: National League
- Division: East
- Ballpark: Olympic Stadium
- City: Montreal
- Record: 86–76 (.531)
- Divisional place: 3rd
- Owners: Charles Bronfman
- General managers: John McHale
- Managers: Jim Fanning
- Television: CBC Television (Dave Van Horne, Duke Snider); Télévision de Radio-Canada (Jean-Pierre Roy, Raymond Lebrun)
- Radio: CFCF (English) (Dave Van Horne, Duke Snider, Tommy Hutton, Ron Reusch); CKAC (French) (Claude Raymond, Jacques Doucet)

The 1982 Montreal Expos season was the 14th season in franchise history. They finished 86–76, 6 games back of the St. Louis Cardinals in the National League East.

== Offseason ==
- December 18, 1981: Announcer Guy Ferron died after a long illness.
- January 14, 1982: Grant Jackson was traded by the Expos to the Kansas City Royals for Ken Phelps.
- March 31, 1982: Larry Parrish and Dave Hostetler were traded by the Expos to the Texas Rangers for Al Oliver.

== Spring training ==
The Expos held spring training at West Palm Beach Municipal Stadium in West Palm Beach, Florida – a facility they shared with the Atlanta Braves. It was their sixth season at the stadium; they had conducted spring training there from 1969 to 1972 and since 1981.

== Regular season ==
- May 9, 1982: Spaceman Bill Lee was released after not showing up at a game. Lee did not show up as a sign of protest because the Expos had released second baseman Rodney Scott.
- August 4, 1982: Joel Youngblood became the first player in history to get hits for two teams in two cities on the same day. Youngblood had driven in the winning run for the Mets in an afternoon game at Wrigley Field against the Chicago Cubs, and then singled in a night game for the Expos in Philadelphia after he had been traded. The two pitchers he hit safely against, Ferguson Jenkins of the Cubs and Steve Carlton of the Philadelphia Phillies, are both in the Baseball Hall of Fame.

=== Opening Day starters ===
- Gary Carter
- Warren Cromartie
- Andre Dawson
- Wallace Johnson
- Al Oliver
- Tim Raines
- Scott Sanderson
- Chris Speier
- Tim Wallach

=== Season standings ===
NL East
Team	W	L	Pct.	GB	Home	Road
St. Louis Cardinals	92	70	.568	—	46‍–‍35	46‍–‍35
Philadelphia Phillies	89	73	.549	3	51‍–‍30	38‍–‍43
Montreal Expos	86	76	.531	6	40‍–‍41	46‍–‍35
Pittsburgh Pirates	84	78	.519	8	42‍–‍39	42‍–‍39
Chicago Cubs	73	89	.451	19	38‍–‍43	35‍–‍46
New York Mets	65	97	.401	27	33‍–‍48	32‍–‍49

=== Record vs. opponents ===
1982 National League record Sources:
Team	ATL	CHC	CIN	HOU	LAD	MON	NYM	PHI	PIT	SD	SF	STL
Atlanta	—	8–4	14–4	10–8	7–11	5–7	9–3	6–6	4–8	11–7	8–10	7–5
Chicago	4–8	—	6–6	9–3	5–7	6–12	9–9	9–9	9–9	4–8	6–6	6–12
Cincinnati	4–14	6–6	—	7–11	7–11	4–8	7–5	5–7	4–8	6–12	6–12	5–7
Houston	8–10	3–9	11–7	—	7–11	4–8	8–4	7–5	9–3	9–9	5–13	6–6
Los Angeles	11–7	7–5	11–7	11–7	—	8–4	6–6	4–8	5–7	9–9	9–9	7–5
Montreal	7–5	12–6	8–4	8–4	4–8	—	11–7	8–10	7–11	7–5	4–8	10–8
New York	3–9	9–9	5–7	4–8	6–6	7–11	—	7–11	8–10	6–6	4–8	6–12
Philadelphia	6-6	9–9	7–5	5–7	8–4	10–8	11–7	—	9–9	7–5	10–2	7–11
Pittsburgh	8–4	9–9	8–4	3–9	7–5	11–7	10–8	9–9	—	6–6	6–6	7–11
San Diego	7–11	8–4	12–6	9–9	9–9	5–7	6–6	5–7	6–6	—	10–8	4–8
San Francisco	10–8	6–6	12–6	13–5	9–9	8–4	8–4	2–10	6–6	8–10	—	5–7
St. Louis	5–7	12–6	7–5	6–6	5–7	8–10	12–6	11–7	11–7	8–4	7–5	—

=== Notable transactions ===
- April 5, 1982: Bobby Ramos was traded by the Expos to the New York Yankees for Brad Gulden.
- May 5, 1982: Rowland Office was released by the Expos.
- May 22, 1982: Jerry Manuel was traded by the Expos to the San Diego Padres for Kim Seaman.
- June 8, 1982: The Expos traded a player to be named later to the San Diego Padres for Jerry Manuel. The Expos completed the deal by sending Mike Griffin to the Padres on August 30.
- June 15, 1982: Dan Schatzeder was purchased by the Expos from the San Francisco Giants.
- August 4, 1982: The Expos traded a player to be named later to the New York Mets for Joel Youngblood. The Expos completed the deal by sending Tom Gorman to the Mets on August 16.
- August 15, 1982: Casey Candaele was signed by the Expos as an amateur free agent.

=== All-Star game ===
On July 13, 1982, the All-Star Game moved across the border and was played in Montreal's Olympic Stadium. It was the first Midsummer Classic ever to be held outside of the United States. The National League won 4–1 before a crowd of 59 057. Steve Rogers was the winning pitcher and Dennis Eckersley took the loss. Dave Concepción was named MVP. Five players represented the Expos on the National League squad: Gary Carter, Andre Dawson, Tim Raines, Al Oliver and Rogers.

=== Roster ===
1982 Montreal Expos
Roster
Pitchers: 48 Ray Burris; 35 Woodie Fryman; 32 Tom Gorman; 34 Bill Gullickson; 20 Bob James; 53 Charlie Lea; 37 Bill Lee; 47 Randy Lerch; 46 David Palmer; 41 Jeff Reardon; 45 Steve Rogers; 21 Scott Sanderson; 43 Dan Schatzeder; 38 Bryn Smith; 37 Dave Tomlin	Catchers: 17 Tim Blackwell; 8 Gary Carter; 33 Brad Gulden; Infielders: 23 Doug Flynn; 19 Mike Gates; 1 Wallace Johnson; 3 Bryan Little; 24 Brad Mills; 5 John Milner; 0 Al Oliver; 12 Mike Phillips; 3 Rodney Scott; 4 Chris Speier; 11 Frank Taveras; 29 Tim Wallach	Outfielders: 49 Warren Cromartie; 10 Andre Dawson; 16 Terry Francona; 27 Roy Johnson; 44 Dan Norman; 25 Rowland Office; 30 Tim Raines; 18 Jerry White; 25 Joel Youngblood; Other batters: 42 Ken Phelps; 5 Chris Smith; 32 Mike Stenhouse	Manager: 6 Jim Fanning; Coaches: 14 Steve Boros (Bench); 36 Galen Cisco (Pitching); 2 Billy DeMars (Hitting/Third base); 40 Bob Gebhard (Bullpen); 9 Vern Rapp (First base)

== Player stats ==
= Indicates team leader

= Indicates league leader

=== Batting ===
==== Starters by position ====
Note: Pos = Position; G = Games played; AB = At bats; H = Hits; Avg. = Batting average; HR = Home runs; RBI = Runs batted in

Pos	Player	G	AB	H	Avg.	HR	RBI
C	Gary Carter	154	557	163	.293	29	97
1B	Al Oliver	160	617	204	.331	22	109
2B	Doug Flynn	58	193	47	.244	0	20
SS	Chris Speier	156	530	136	.257	7	60
3B	Tim Wallach	158	596	160	.268	28	97
LF	Tim Raines	156	647	179	.277	4	43
CF	Andre Dawson	148	608	183	.301	23	83
RF	Warren Cromartie	144	497	126	.254	14	62

==== Other batters ====
Note: G = Games played; AB = At bats; H = Hits; Avg. = Batting average; HR = Home runs; RBI = Runs batted in

Player	G	AB	H	Avg.	HR	RBI
Terry Francona	46	131	42	.321	0	9
Mike Gates	36	121	28	.231	0	8
Jerry White	69	115	28	.243	2	13
Joel Youngblood	40	90	18	.200	0	8
Frank Taveras	48	87	14	.161	0	4
Brad Mills	54	67	15	.224	1	2
Dan Norman	53	66	14	.212	2	7
Wallace Johnson	36	57	11	.193	0	2
Bryan Little	29	42	9	.214	0	3
Tim Blackwell	23	42	8	.190	0	3
Roy Johnson	17	32	7	.219	0	2
John Milner	26	28	3	.107	0	2
Rodney Scott	14	25	5	.200	0	1
Ken Phelps	10	8	2	.250	0	0
Mike Phillips	14	8	1	.125	0	1
Brad Gulden	5	6	0	.000	0	0
Rowland Office	3	3	1	.333	0	0
Chris Smith	2	2	0	.000	0	0
Mike Stenhouse	1	1	0	.000	0	0

=== Pitching ===
==== Starting pitchers ====
Note: G = Games pitched; IP = Innings pitched; W = Wins; L = Losses; ERA = Earned run average; SO = Strikeouts

Player	G	IP	W	L	ERA	SO
Steve Rogers	35	277.0	19	8	2.40	179
Bill Gullickson	34	236.2	12	14	3.57	155
Scott Sanderson	32	224.0	12	12	3.46	158
Charlie Lea	27	177.2	12	10	3.24	115
David Palmer	13	73.2	6	4	3.18	46

==== Other pitchers ====
Note: G = Games pitched; IP = Innings pitched; W = Wins; L = Losses; ERA = Earned run average; SO = Strikeouts

Player	G	IP	W	L	ERA	SO
Ray Burris	37	123.2	4	14	4.73	55
Randy Lerch	6	23.2	2	0	3.42	4

==== Relief pitchers ====
Note: G = Games pitched; W = Wins; L = Losses; SV = Saves; ERA = Earned run average; SO = Strikeouts

Player	G	W	L	SV	ERA	SO
Jeff Reardon	75	7	4	26	2.06	86
Woodie Fryman	60	9	4	12	3.75	46
Bryn Smith	47	2	4	3	4.20	50
Dan Schatzeder	26	0	2	0	3.50	15
Bill Lee	7	0	0	0	4.38	8
Bob James	7	0	0	0	6.00	11
Tom Gorman	5	1	0	0	5.14	6
Dave Tomlin	1	0	0	0	4.50	2

== Award winners ==
- Gary Carter, Gold Glove Award, Catcher
- Andre Dawson, Gold Glove Award, Outfield
- Tim Raines, National League Stolen Base Leader, 78
- Steve Rogers, Pitcher of the Month, April

1982 Major League Baseball All-Star Game

- Gary Carter, catcher
- Andre Dawson, outfield
- Tim Raines, outfield
- Al Oliver, first baseman
- Steve Rogers, pitcher

== Farm system ==
Level	Team	League	Manager
AAA	Wichita Aeros	American Association	Felipe Alou
AA	Memphis Chicks	Southern League	Rick Renick
A	San Jose Expos	California League	Tommy Thompson
A	West Palm Beach Expos	Florida State League	J. R. Miner
A-Short Season	Jamestown Expos	New York–Penn League	Moby Benedict
Rookie	Calgary Expos	Pioneer League	Bob Reece
