= Joe Rigoli =

Baseball scout

- Coach
- Born: December 14, 1956 (age 69); New York, New York, U.S.
- Bats: Right Throws: Right
- Stats at Baseball Reference

Teams
- Philadelphia Phillies (1996–1997)

Joseph M. Rigoli (born December 14, 1956, in New York City) is an American professional baseball scout, and a former coach in the Major Leagues for the Philadelphia Phillies. A longtime scout for the St. Louis Cardinals, he is a member of the Professional Baseball Scouts Hall of Fame.

Rigoli's playing career was brief. After appearing in only two games for the 1978 Bend Timber Hawks of the Short Season-A Northwest League, an affiliate of the Oakland Athletics, he played in 29 games the following season for the 1979 Newark Co-Pilots, a co-op (unaffiliated) club in the Short Season-A New York–Penn League, collecting 14 hits in 61 at bats (.230) in a utility role, playing catcher, outfielder and second base. He first joined the Cardinals in 1981 as a minor league manager for the Class A level Gastonia Cardinals. In 1984, while piloting the Springfield Cardinals of the Midwest League, he filled in as a pitcher on four occasions, compiling a 6.43 earned run average in seven innings pitched.

After scouting for the Cardinals during the late 1980s through the mid-1990s, he joined the Phillies in 1996 as a bullpen coach, working on the staff of manager Jim Fregosi. He spent 1997 in the same role under new skipper Terry Francona but in 1998 he returned to the Redbirds as a minor-league coach. In 2013 he was listed as a member of the Cardinals' professional scouting staff, based in Parsippany, New Jersey.
