= Charlie Puleo =

American baseball player (born 1955)

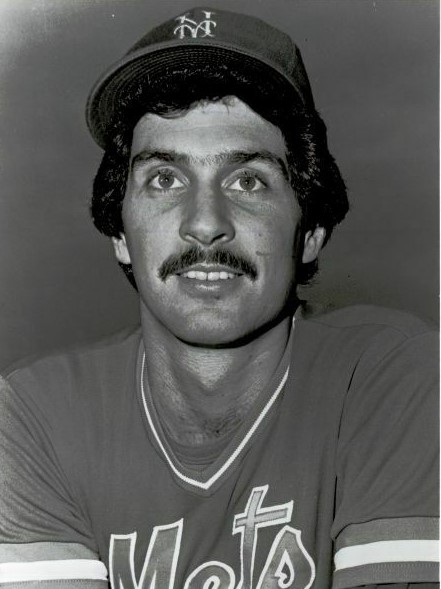
- Pitcher
- Born: February 7, 1955 (age 70); Glen Ridge, New Jersey, U.S.
- Batted: Right Threw: Right

MLB debut
- September 16, 1981, for the New York Mets

Last MLB appearance
- September 25, 1989, for the Atlanta Braves

MLB statistics
- Win–loss record: 29–39
- Earned run average: 4.25
- Strikeouts: 387
- Stats at Baseball Reference

Teams
- New York Mets (1981–1982); Cincinnati Reds (1983–1984); Atlanta Braves (1986–1989)

Charles Michael Puleo (born February 7, 1955) is a retired Major League Baseball pitcher who played from 1981 to 1989 with the New York Mets, Cincinnati Reds and Atlanta Braves.

Puleo played baseball at Bloomfield High School.

Puleo is probably best remembered for being the pitcher the Mets traded in order to reacquire Tom Seaver before the 1983 season.
