= Bob Forsch =

American baseball player (1950–2011)

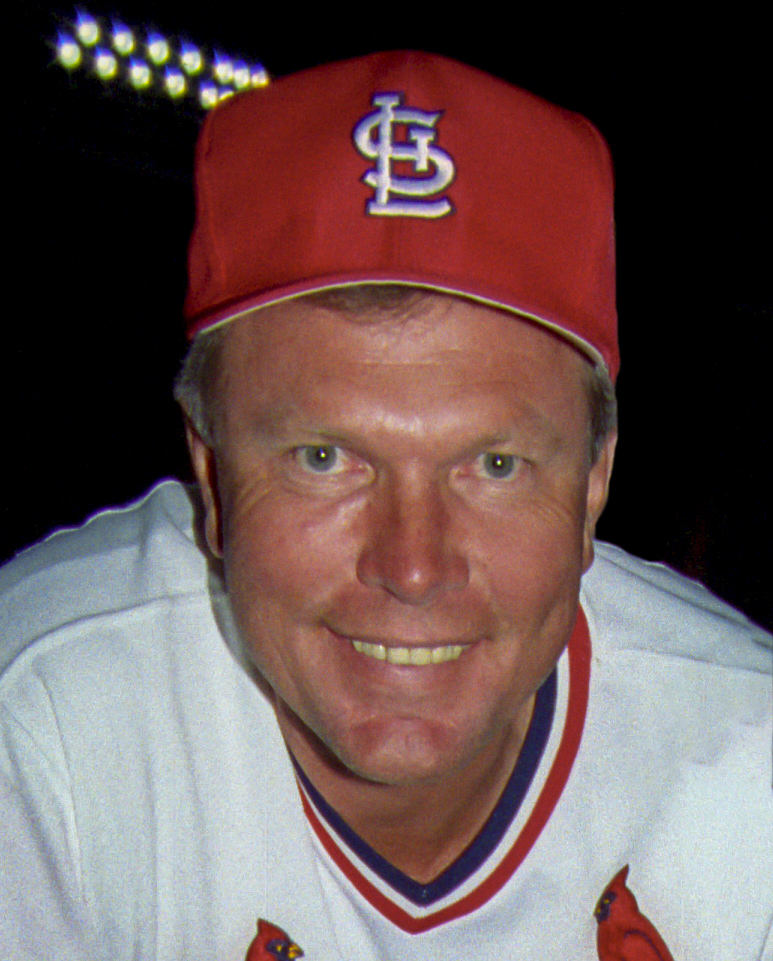
- Forsch in 1983
- Pitcher
- Born: January 13, 1950; Sacramento, California, U.S.
- Died: November 3, 2011 (aged 61); Weeki Wachee, Florida, U.S.
- Batted: Right Threw: Right

MLB debut
- July 7, 1974, for the St. Louis Cardinals

Last MLB appearance
- September 25, 1989, for the Houston Astros

MLB statistics
- Win–loss record: 168–136
- Earned run average: 3.76
- Strikeouts: 1,133
- Stats at Baseball Reference

Teams
- St. Louis Cardinals (1974–1988); Houston Astros (1988–1989)

Career highlights and awards
- World Series champion (1982); 2× Silver Slugger Award (1980, 1987); Pitched two no-hitters (1978, 1983); St. Louis Cardinals Hall of Fame

Robert Herbert Forsch (January 13, 1950 – November 3, 2011) was an American professional baseball pitcher. He played 16 seasons in Major League Baseball (MLB) for the St. Louis Cardinals and Houston Astros. He was a member of the 1982 World Series champions and National League (NL) pennant winners in 1985 and 1987.

A twenty-game winner in 1977, he is fourth amongst all Cardinals pitcher in victories with 163. He is also the only player in team history to pitch more than one no-hitter, achieving it twice in 1978 and 1983. He and Ken Forsch are the only brothers to have each performed the feat in the majors.

== Early years ==
Forsch graduated from Hiram Johnson High School in Sacramento, California, and attended Sacramento City College. He was drafted by the St. Louis Cardinals in the 26th round of the 1968 Major League Baseball draft as a third baseman, eight rounds after his brother was selected by the Houston Astros. His batting records as an infielder-outfielder were .224 for the Sarasota Cards in 1968, .203 for Lewiston in 1969, .235 for Modesto also in 1969, .149 for Modesto in 1970, .133 for Lewiston also in 1970, and .088 for Cedar Rapids also in 1970. He compiled a .223 batting average with four home runs before he was converted to a pitcher with the Cards' low A affiliate, the Lewiston Broncs, in 1970. Forsch went 41–37 with a 3.96 earned run average over four and a half seasons pitching in their farm system.

== Career ==
Forsch was called up to St. Louis midway through the 1974 season. Making his major league debut in the first game of a doubleheader at Riverfront Stadium, he lost a pitchers' duel with Tom Carroll and the Cincinnati Reds. He shut out the Atlanta Braves in his second start to earn his first major league victory, but perhaps his most memorable pitching performance of the season came on September 30 against the Montreal Expos. In the second to last game of the Cardinals' season, needing a win to remain tied with the Pittsburgh Pirates atop the National League East, Forsch carried a no-hitter into the seventh inning. He ended up with a complete game three-hitter for his fourth consecutive win.

Forsch was a twenty-game winner in 1977. He pitched his first career no-hitter on April 16, 1978 against the Philadelphia Phillies with the help of a questionable ruling by official scorer Neal Russo of the St. Louis Post-Dispatch on a Ken Reitz error off the bat of Garry Maddox. Regardless, his record stood at 3–0 with a 0.71 ERA following the game. Things, however, began to unravel for Forsch shortly thereafter. After a May 11 three hit shutout against the Los Angeles Dodgers improved his record to 6–2, Forsch went 5–15 with a 4.07 ERA the rest of the way to end the season at 11–17.

After nine seasons in the majors, Forsch made it to the postseason for the first time in his career in 1982. He also earned his first career save on May 15 against the Atlanta Braves. He got the game one start in the 1982 National League Championship Series, and held the Atlanta Braves to three hits while striking out six. He also went 2-for-3 with an RBI and a run scored. He lost both of his World Series starts against the Milwaukee Brewers, but the Cardinals won the series in seven games.

After going 15–9 with a 3.48 ERA in 1982, his record fell to 10–12 with a 4.28 ERA the following season, as the defending World Champions dipped to 79–83 and fourth place in the NL East. One of the few bright spots for his club came on September 26, 1983, when Forsch pitched his second career no-hitter, this time against the Montreal Expos. He became, at the time, just the 25th pitcher to throw more than one career no-hitter, and the only Cardinals pitcher to accomplish the feat.. His career was threatened when he required back surgery during the 1984 season to relieve pressure on a nerve on his lower back. After sitting out three months, however, he was able to return to the mound.

Forsch's final win of the 1985 season was a 4–2 victory over the Chicago Cubs on October 4 to clinch a first place tie with the New York Mets, as they and the Mets battled for first place in the NL East all season. The Cards ended up winning the division by three games, and defeating the Los Angeles Dodgers in the 1985 National League Championship Series. With the Kansas City Royals representing the American League in the World Series, 1985 was the first time two teams from the same state faced off in a World Series since 1974, and the first time two teams from Missouri faced each other since the 1944 World Series. The Royals beat the Cardinals in seven games for the franchise's first World Series title. Forsch went 0–1 with an 8.53 ERA in his second postseason.

Forsch made headlines during the 1987 National League Championship Series, which pitted the Cards against the San Francisco Giants. The Giants led the series after Game 2, owing in part to the batting prowess of outfielder Jeffrey Leonard, who scored nine runs and drove in five RBIs during the series. The Cardinal fans were enraged with Leonard's "one-flap down" routine of running the bases, and his "Cadillac" home run trot. While pitching to Leonard in the fifth inning, Forsch famously hit Leonard in the back with a fastball. This created a stir in the St. Louis press, which began calling Leonard "both flaps down". Forsch unconvincingly commented, "just trying to come inside".

Forsch was 9–4 with a 3.73 ERA in 1988 when he was traded just before the waiver trade deadline to the Houston Astros, who were making a playoff push in the National League West. Forsch pitched poorly for the Astros, going 1–4 with a 6.51 ERA. Forsch re-signed with the Astros for 1989, and went 4–5 with a 5.32 ERA while splitting his time as a starter and relief pitcher. He retired after the season.

== Career stats ==
W	L	PCT	ERA	G	GS	CG	SHO	SV	IP	H	ER	R	HR	BB	K	WP	HBP	Fld%	BA	RBI
168	136	.553	3.76	498	422	67	19	3	2,794.2	2,777	1,169	1,319	216	832	1,133	93	45	.973	.213	84

Forsch was one of the better hitting pitchers of his era. He hit 12 career home runs, batted .308 (24-for-78) in 1975, won the inaugural Silver Slugger Award for NL pitchers in 1980 and a second Silver Slugger award in 1987. Forsch's no-hitters were the only two ever thrown at Busch Memorial Stadium. His 163 career wins with the Cardinals is the franchise's fourth highest total.

== Personal life ==
In 1971, while Forsch was playing at Cedar Rapids, he struck up a conversation with Mollie Jane Knaau at a local restaurant. They married in June 1972. The couple had two daughters, Amy and Kristin. Forsch's first marriage ended in divorce after 30 years. He remarried thereafter to his second wife, Janice.

== Death ==
Forsch was a Minor League pitching coach for the Reds' Rookie League affiliate, the Billings Mustangs from 2009 until his death. He also wrote a book titled Bob Forsch's Tales from the Cardinals Dugout, with Tom Wheatley.

Forsch died suddenly from a thoracic aortic aneurysm on November 3, 2011. Less than a week before his death, he threw out the ceremonial first pitch before Game Seven of the 2011 World Series at Busch Stadium in St. Louis.

== See also ==
- List of St. Louis Cardinals team records
- List of Major League Baseball no-hitters

Preceded by Bert Blyleven; Dave Righetti	No-hitter pitcher April 16, 1978; September 26, 1983	Succeeded by Tom Seaver; Mike Warren
Preceded by Award established Rick Rhoden	NL Silver Slugger Award pitcher 1980; 1987	Succeeded by Fernando Valenzuela; Tim Leary
