= 1982 Major League Baseball season =

1982 MLB season
- League: American League (AL); National League (NL)
- Sport: Baseball
- Duration: Regular season: April 5 – October 3, 1982; Postseason: October 5–20, 1982
- Games: 162
- Teams: 26 (14 AL, 12 NL)
- TV partner(s): ABC, NBC, USA

Draft
- Top draft pick: Shawon Dunston
- Picked by: Chicago Cubs

Regular season
- Season MVP: AL: Robin Yount (MIL); NL: Dale Murphy (ATL)

Postseason
- AL champions: Milwaukee Brewers
- AL runners-up: California Angels
- NL champions: St. Louis Cardinals
- NL runners-up: Atlanta Braves

World Series
- Champions: St. Louis Cardinals
- Runners-up: Milwaukee Brewers
- World Series MVP: Darrell Porter (STL)

MLB seasons
- ← 1981 1983 →

Locations of teams for the 1982–1988 American League seasons
West East
Locations of teams for the 1977–1992 National League seasons
West East

The 1982 major league baseball season began on April 5 while the regular season ended on October 3. The postseason began on October 5. The 79th World Series then began on October 12 and concluded on October 20 with the St. Louis Cardinals of the National League defeating the Milwaukee Brewers of the American League, four games to three, to win their ninth title in franchise history.

The 53rd All-Star Game was held on July 13 at Olympic Stadium, home of the Montreal Expos. The National League won, 4–2, and was the last win in an 11-game win streak that started in 1972.

This was the first season since 1959 in which there wasn't a no-hitter pitched.^{[a]}

On October 3, the San Francisco Giants eliminated the defending World Series champion Los Angeles Dodgers from playoff contention in favor of the Atlanta Braves. This was one of the few times a defending champion was eliminated on the final day of the regular season.

== Schedule ==
The 1982 schedule consisted of 162 games for all 14 teams in the American League and 12 teams in the National League. Both leagues saw different schedule formats, as they had since 1977. The American League was split into two seven-team divisions. Each team was scheduled to play 13 games against their six division rivals, totaling 78 games, and 12 games against seven opponents, totaling 84 interdivision games. This format, used since 1979 would be used until the league realigned into three division for the 1994 season. Meanwhile, the National League was split into two six-team divisions. Each team was scheduled to play 18 games against their five division rivals, totaling 90 games, and 12 games against six interdivision opponents, totaling 72 games. This continued the format put in place since the 1969, and like the American League, would continue to be the format in use until 1993.

Opening Day took place on April 5, featuring four teams. The final day of the scheduled regular season was on October 3, featuring all 26 teams. The American League Championship Series took place between October 5 and October 10, while the National League Championship Series took place between October 6 and October 10. The World Series took place between October 12 and October 20.

== Rule changes ==
The 1982 season saw the following rule changes:

- If a pitched ball lodges into the mask or paraphernalia of the umpire or catcher, runners advance one base. Previously, this rule only mentioned the umpire.
- The 1980 rounding rule which changed the calculation of earned run average (all innings pitched (with the exception of 1/3 of an inning) will be rounded to the nearest whole number) was reverted. All calculations will be to the exact 1/3 inning.
- A player's consecutive-game hitting streak is not determined by his team's games, but by his own appearances.

== Teams ==
League	Division	Team	City	Ballpark	Capacity	Manager
American League	East	Baltimore Orioles	Baltimore, Maryland	Baltimore Memorial Stadium	53,208	Earl Weaver
American League	East	Boston Red Sox	Boston, Massachusetts	Fenway Park	33,538	Ralph Houk
American League	East	Cleveland Indians	Cleveland, Ohio	Cleveland Stadium	74,483	Dave Garcia
American League	East	Detroit Tigers	Detroit, Michigan	Tiger Stadium	52,806	Sparky Anderson
American League	East	Milwaukee Brewers	Milwaukee, Wisconsin	Milwaukee County Stadium	53,192	Buck Rodgers
American League	East	Milwaukee Brewers	Milwaukee, Wisconsin	Milwaukee County Stadium	53,192	Harvey Kuenn
American League	East	New York Yankees	New York, New York	Yankee Stadium	57,545	Bob Lemon
American League	East	New York Yankees	New York, New York	Yankee Stadium	57,545	Gene Michael
American League	East	New York Yankees	New York, New York	Yankee Stadium	57,545	Clyde King
American League	East	Toronto Blue Jays	Toronto, Ontario	Exhibition Stadium	43,737	Bobby Cox
American League	West	California Angels	Anaheim, California	Anaheim Stadium	64,573	Gene Mauch
American League	West	Chicago White Sox	Chicago, Illinois	Comiskey Park	44,492	Tony La Russa
American League	West	Kansas City Royals	Kansas City, Missouri	Royals Stadium	40,613	Dick Howser
American League	West	Minnesota Twins	Minneapolis, Minnesota	Hubert H. Humphrey Metrodome	54,711	Billy Gardner
American League	West	Oakland Athletics	Oakland, California	Oakland–Alameda County Coliseum	50,000	Billy Martin
American League	West	Seattle Mariners	Seattle, Washington	Kingdome	59,059	Rene Lachemann
American League	West	Texas Rangers	Arlington, Texas	Arlington Stadium	41,284	Don Zimmer
American League	West	Texas Rangers	Arlington, Texas	Arlington Stadium	41,284	Darrell Johnson
National League	East	Chicago Cubs	Chicago, Illinois	Wrigley Field	37,702	Lee Elia
National League	East	Montreal Expos	Montreal, Quebec	Olympic Stadium	59,149	Jim Fanning
National League	East	New York Mets	New York, New York	Shea Stadium	55,300	George Bamberger
National League	East	Philadelphia Phillies	Philadelphia, Pennsylvania	Veterans Stadium	62,382	Pat Corrales
National League	East	Pittsburgh Pirates	Pittsburgh, Pennsylvania	Three Rivers Stadium	58,722	Chuck Tanner
National League	East	St. Louis Cardinals	St. Louis, Missouri	Busch Stadium	53,138	Whitey Herzog
National League	West	Atlanta Braves	Atlanta, Georgia	Atlanta–Fulton County Stadium	52,785	Joe Torre
National League	West	Cincinnati Reds	Cincinnati, Ohio	Riverfront Stadium	52,953	John McNamara
National League	West	Cincinnati Reds	Cincinnati, Ohio	Riverfront Stadium	52,953	Russ Nixon
National League	West	Houston Astros	Houston, Texas	Houston Astrodome	47,000	Bill Virdon
National League	West	Houston Astros	Houston, Texas	Houston Astrodome	47,000	Bob Lillis
National League	West	Los Angeles Dodgers	Los Angeles, California	Dodger Stadium	56,000	Tommy Lasorda
National League	West	San Diego Padres	San Diego, California	Jack Murphy Stadium	50,000	Dick Williams
National League	West	San Francisco Giants	San Francisco, California	Candlestick Park	58,495	Frank Robinson

== Standings ==
=== American League ===
AL East
Team	W	L	Pct.	GB	Home	Road
Milwaukee Brewers	95	67	.586	—	48‍–‍34	47‍–‍33
Baltimore Orioles	94	68	.580	1	53‍–‍28	41‍–‍40
Boston Red Sox	89	73	.549	6	49‍–‍32	40‍–‍41
Detroit Tigers	83	79	.512	12	47‍–‍34	36‍–‍45
New York Yankees	79	83	.488	16	42‍–‍39	37‍–‍44
Cleveland Indians	78	84	.481	17	41‍–‍40	37‍–‍44
Toronto Blue Jays	78	84	.481	17	44‍–‍37	34‍–‍47

AL West
Team	W	L	Pct.	GB	Home	Road
California Angels	93	69	.574	—	52‍–‍29	41‍–‍40
Kansas City Royals	90	72	.556	3	56‍–‍25	34‍–‍47
Chicago White Sox	87	75	.537	6	49‍–‍31	38‍–‍44
Seattle Mariners	76	86	.469	17	42‍–‍39	34‍–‍47
Oakland Athletics	68	94	.420	25	36‍–‍45	32‍–‍49
Texas Rangers	64	98	.395	29	38‍–‍43	26‍–‍55
Minnesota Twins	60	102	.370	33	37‍–‍44	23‍–‍58

=== National League ===
NL East
Team	W	L	Pct.	GB	Home	Road
St. Louis Cardinals	92	70	.568	—	46‍–‍35	46‍–‍35
Philadelphia Phillies	89	73	.549	3	51‍–‍30	38‍–‍43
Montreal Expos	86	76	.531	6	40‍–‍41	46‍–‍35
Pittsburgh Pirates	84	78	.519	8	42‍–‍39	42‍–‍39
Chicago Cubs	73	89	.451	19	38‍–‍43	35‍–‍46
New York Mets	65	97	.401	27	33‍–‍48	32‍–‍49

NL West
Team	W	L	Pct.	GB	Home	Road
Atlanta Braves	89	73	.549	—	42‍–‍39	47‍–‍34
Los Angeles Dodgers	88	74	.543	1	43‍–‍38	45‍–‍36
San Francisco Giants	87	75	.537	2	45‍–‍36	42‍–‍39
San Diego Padres	81	81	.500	8	43‍–‍38	38‍–‍43
Houston Astros	77	85	.475	12	43‍–‍38	34‍–‍47
Cincinnati Reds	61	101	.377	28	33‍–‍48	28‍–‍53

=== Tie game ===
1 tie game (1 in AL, 0 in NL), which is not factored into winning percentage or games behind (and was replayed again) occurred during the season.

==== American League ====
- June 16, Milwaukee Brewers vs. Baltimore Orioles, tied at 2 through 9 innings on account of rain.

== Postseason ==
The postseason began on October 5 and ended on October 20 with the St. Louis Cardinals defeating the Milwaukee Brewers in the 1982 World Series in seven games.

=== Bracket ===
League Championship Series (ALCS, NLCS)
East	Milwaukee	3
West	California	2
East	St. Louis	3
West	Atlanta	0

World Series
AL	Milwaukee	3
NL	St. Louis	4

== Managerial changes ==
=== Off-season ===
Team	Former Manager	New Manager
Atlanta Braves	Bobby Cox	Joe Torre
Chicago Cubs	Joey Amalfitano	Lee Elia
New York Mets	Joe Torre	George Bamberger
Philadelphia Phillies	Dallas Green	Pat Corrales
San Diego Padres	Frank Howard	Dick Williams
Toronto Blue Jays	Bobby Mattick	Bobby Cox

=== In-season ===
Team	Former Manager	New Manager
Cincinnati Reds	John McNamara	Russ Nixon
Houston Astros	Bill Virdon	Bob Lillis
Milwaukee Brewers	Buck Rodgers	Harvey Kuenn
New York Yankees	Bob Lemon	Gene Michael
New York Yankees	Gene Michael	Clyde King
Texas Rangers	Don Zimmer	Darrell Johnson

== League leaders ==
=== American League ===
Hitting leaders
Stat	Player	Total
AVG	Willie Wilson (KC)	.332
OPS	Robin Yount (MIL)	.957
HR	Reggie Jackson (CAL); Gorman Thomas (MIL)	39
RBI	Hal McRae (KC)	133
R	Paul Molitor (MIL)	136
H	Robin Yount (MIL)	210
SB	Rickey Henderson^{1} (OAK)	130

^{1} Modern (1901–present) single-season stolen base record

Pitching leaders
Stat	Player	Total
W	LaMarr Hoyt (CWS)	19
L	Matt Keough (OAK); Frank Tanana (TEX)	18
ERA	Rick Sutcliffe (CLE)	2.96
K	Floyd Bannister (SEA)	209
IP	Dave Stieb (TOR)	288.1
SV	Dan Quisenberry (KC)	35
WHIP	Jim Palmer (BAL)	1.137

=== National League ===
Hitting leaders
Stat	Player	Total
AVG	Al Oliver (MON)	.331
OPS	Mike Schmidt (PHI)	.949
HR	Dave Kingman (NYM)	37
RBI	Dale Murphy (ATL); Al Oliver (MON)	109
R	Lonnie Smith (STL)	120
H	Al Oliver (MON)	204
SB	Tim Raines (MON)	78

Pitching leaders
Stat	Player	Total
W	Steve Carlton (PHI)	23
L	Bruce Berenyi (CIN)	18
ERA	Steve Rogers (MON)	2.40
K	Steve Carlton (PHI)	286
IP	Steve Carlton (PHI)	295.2
SV	Bruce Sutter (STL)	36
WHIP	Mario Soto (CIN)	1.060

== Milestones ==
=== Batters ===
==== Cycles ====
- Frank White (KC):
  - White hit for his second cycle and fifth in franchise history on August 3 against the Detroit Tigers.

==== Other batting accomplishments ====
- Cal Ripken Jr. (BAL):
  - Plays the first of what would become a record-breaking 2,632 consecutive games by starting at third base against the Toronto Blue Jays on May 30.
- Pete Rose (PHI):
  - Became the sixth player in major league history to play in 3,000 games on June 20 against the Pittsburgh Pirates.
- César Cedeño (CIN):
  - Recorded his 500th career stolen base in the sixth inning against the New York Mets on August 17. He became the 25th player to reach this mark.

=== Pitchers ===
- Gaylord Perry (SEA):
  - Became the 15th member of the 300-win club, defeating the New York Yankees on May 6, winning 7–3.
- Ferguson Jenkins (CHC):
  - Recorded his 3,000th career strikeout on May 25 by striking out Garry Templeton of the San Diego Padres in the third inning. Sutton becomes the seventh player to reach this mark.

== Awards and honors ==
Baseball Writers' Association of America Awards
BBWAA Award	National League	American League
Rookie of the Year	Steve Sax (LAD)	Cal Ripken Jr. (BAL)
Cy Young Award	Steve Carlton (PHI)	Pete Vuckovich (MIL)
Most Valuable Player	Dale Murphy (ATL)	Robin Yount (MIL)
Babe Ruth Award (World Series MVP)	Bruce Sutter (STL)	—
Gold Glove Awards
Position	National League	American League
Pitcher	Phil Niekro (ATL)	Ron Guidry (NYY)
Catcher	Gary Carter (MON)	Bob Boone (CAL)
First Baseman	Keith Hernandez (STL)	Eddie Murray (BAL)
Second Baseman	Manny Trillo (PHI)	Frank White (KC)
Third Baseman	Mike Schmidt (PHI)	Buddy Bell (TEX)
Shortstop	Ozzie Smith (STL)	Robin Yount (MIL)
Outfielders	Andre Dawson (MON)	Dwight Evans (BOS)
Outfielders	Garry Maddox (PHI)	Dwayne Murphy (OAK)
Outfielders	Dale Murphy (ATL)	Dave Winfield (NYY)
Silver Slugger Awards
Pitcher/Designated Hitter	Don Robinson (PIT)	Hal McRae (KC)
Catcher	Gary Carter (MON)	Lance Parrish (DET)
First Baseman	Al Oliver (MON)	Cecil Cooper (MIL)
Second Baseman	Joe Morgan (SF)	Dámaso García (TOR)
Third Baseman	Mike Schmidt (PHI)	Doug DeCinces (CAL)
Shortstop	Dave Concepción (CIN)	Robin Yount (MIL)
Outfielders	Leon Durham (CHC)	Reggie Jackson (CAL)
Outfielders	Pedro Guerrero (LAD)	Willie Wilson (KC)
Outfielders	Dale Murphy (ATL)	Dave Winfield (NYY)

=== Other awards ===
- Outstanding Designated Hitter Award: Hal McRae (KC)
- Roberto Clemente Award (Humanitarian): Ken Singleton (BAL)
- Hutch Award: Andre Thornton (CLE)
- League Championship Series Most Valuable Player Award: Darrell Porter (STL, National); Fred Lynn (CAL, American)
- Rolaids Relief Man Award: Bruce Sutter (STL, National); Dan Quisenberry (KC, American)
- Sport Magazine's World Series Most Valuable Player Award: Darrell Porter (STL)

The Sporting News Awards
Award	National League	American League
Player of the Year	—	Robin Yount (MIL)
Pitcher of the Year	Steve Carlton (PHI)	Dave Stieb (TOR)
Fireman of the Year (Relief pitcher)	Bruce Sutter (STL)	Dan Quisenberry (KC)
Rookie Player of the Year	Cal Ripken Jr. (BAL)	Johnny Ray (PIT)
Rookie Pitcher of the Year	Steve Bedrosian (ATL)	Ed Vande Berg (SEA)
Comeback Player of the Year	Joe Morgan (SF)	Andre Thornton (CLE)
Manager of the Year	Whitey Herzog (STL)	—
Executive of the Year	—	Harry Dalton (MIL)

=== Monthly awards ===
==== Player of the Month ====
Month	American League	National League
April	Dale Murphy (ATL)	Eddie Murray (BAL)
May	Tim Wallach (MON)	Hal McRae (KC)
June	Al Oliver (MON)	George Brett (KC)
July	Mike Schmidt (PHI)	Robin Yount (MIL)
August	Bill Buckner (CHC)	Doug DeCinces (CAL)
September	Claudell Washington (ATL)	Dave Winfield (NYY)

==== Pitcher of the Month ====
Month	American League	National League
April	Steve Rogers (MON)	Geoff Zahn (CAL)
May	Dick Ruthven (PHI)	LaMarr Hoyt (CWS)
June	Steve Howe (LAD)	Jim Beattie (SEA)
July	John Candelaria (PIT)	Tippy Martinez (BAL)
August	Nolan Ryan (HOU)	Jim Palmer (BAL)
September	Joaquín Andújar (STL)	Rick Sutcliffe (CLE)

=== Baseball Hall of Fame ===
- Hank Aaron
- Travis Jackson
- Frank Robinson
- Happy Chandler (executive)

== Home field attendance ==
Team name	Wins	%±	Home attendance	%±	Per game
Los Angeles Dodgers	88	39.7%	3,608,881	51.6%	44,554
California Angels	93	82.4%	2,807,360	94.7%	34,659
Philadelphia Phillies	89	50.8%	2,376,394	45.0%	29,338
Montreal Expos	86	43.3%	2,318,292	51.1%	28,621
Kansas City Royals	90	80.0%	2,284,464	78.6%	28,203
St. Louis Cardinals	92	55.9%	2,111,906	109.0%	26,073
New York Yankees	79	33.9%	2,041,219	26.4%	25,200
Milwaukee Brewers	95	53.2%	1,978,896	126.3%	24,133
Boston Red Sox	89	50.8%	1,950,124	83.9%	24,076
Atlanta Braves	89	78.0%	1,801,985	236.6%	22,247
Oakland Athletics	68	6.3%	1,735,489	33.1%	21,426
Detroit Tigers	83	38.3%	1,636,058	42.4%	20,198
Baltimore Orioles	94	59.3%	1,613,031	57.5%	19,671
San Diego Padres	81	97.6%	1,607,516	209.6%	19,846
Chicago White Sox	87	61.1%	1,567,787	65.6%	19,597
Houston Astros	77	26.2%	1,558,555	18.0%	19,241
Cincinnati Reds	61	-7.6%	1,326,528	21.3%	16,377
New York Mets	65	58.5%	1,323,036	87.9%	16,334
Toronto Blue Jays	78	110.8%	1,275,978	69.0%	15,753
Chicago Cubs	73	92.1%	1,249,278	120.9%	15,423
San Francisco Giants	87	55.4%	1,200,948	89.9%	14,827
Texas Rangers	64	12.3%	1,154,432	35.8%	14,252
Seattle Mariners	76	72.7%	1,070,404	68.2%	13,215
Cleveland Indians	78	50.0%	1,044,021	57.9%	12,889
Pittsburgh Pirates	84	82.6%	1,024,106	89.0%	12,643
Minnesota Twins	60	46.3%	921,186	96.4%	11,373

== Venues ==
The Minnesota Twins leave Metropolitan Stadium from which they played 21 seasons and opened Hubert H. Humphrey Metrodome, where they would go on to play for 28 seasons through 2009.

Civic Center Busch Memorial Stadium, home of the St. Louis Cardinals, was shortened to Busch Stadium.

== Media ==
=== Television ===
Network	Day of week	Announcers
ABC	Monday nights Sunday afternoons	Keith Jackson, Howard Cosell, Don Drysdale, Al Michaels, Bob Uecker, Jim Palmer, Tommy Lasorda
NBC	Saturday afternoons	Joe Garagiola, Tony Kubek, Dick Enberg, Bob Costas, Sal Bando
USA	Thursday nights	Eddie Doucette, Nelson Briles, Monte Moore, Wes Parker

== Retired numbers ==
- Gene Autry had No. 26 retired by the California Angels on August 3 in honor of being the team founder. The number represents the "26th man". At the time of the number's retirement, major league rosters were limited to 25 players prior September 1, when rosters expanded to 40. This was the first number retired by the team.
- Ernie Banks had his No. 14 retired by the Chicago Cubs on August 22. This was the first number retired by the team.
- Willie Stargell had his No. 8 retired by the Pittsburgh Pirates on September 6. This was the sixth number retired by the team.
- Earl Weaver had his No. 4 retired by the Baltimore Orioles on September 19. This was the third number retired by the team.

== Notes ==
^{a} Major League Baseball seasons since 1901 without a no-hitter pitched are 1909, 1913, 1921, 1927–1928, 1932–1933, 1936, 1939, 1942–1943, 1949, 1959, 1982, 1985, 1989, 2000 and 2005.

== See also ==
- 1982 in baseball (Events, Births, Deaths)
- 1982 Nippon Professional Baseball season
