= 1982 Chicago Cubs season =

1982 Chicago Cubs
- League: National League
- Division: East
- Ballpark: Wrigley Field
- City: Chicago
- Record: 73–89 (.451)
- Divisional place: 5th
- Owners: Tribune Company
- General managers: Dallas Green
- Managers: Lee Elia
- Television: WGN-TV (Harry Caray, Lou Boudreau, Milo Hamilton)
- Radio: WGN (Milo Hamilton, Vince Lloyd, Lou Boudreau, Harry Caray)
- Stats: ESPN.com; Baseball Reference

The 1982 Chicago Cubs season was the 111th season of the Chicago Cubs franchise, the 107th in the National League and the 67th at Wrigley Field. The Cubs finished fifth in the National League East with a record of 73–89, 19 games behind the eventual National League and 1982 World Series Champion St. Louis Cardinals. For the first time in more than a half a century, the Cubs were not owned by a member of the Wrigley family. Instead, it was the first full season for the Cubs under the ownership of the Tribune Company, owners of the team's broadcast partner WGN TV and Radio, and for Cubs TV viewers the first season ever for them to see and hear Harry Caray on the broadcast panel.

== Offseason ==
November 15, 1981: Steve Macko, a promising prospect passes away after a short bout with testicular cancer.

- December 8, 1981: Mike Krukow and cash were traded by the Cubs to the Philadelphia Phillies for Dickie Noles, Dan Larson and Keith Moreland.
- December 28, 1981: The Cubs traded a player to be named later to the Toronto Blue Jays for Paul Mirabella. The Cubs completed the deal by sending Dave Geisel to the Blue Jays on March 25.
- January 27, 1982: Iván DeJesús was traded by the Cubs to the Philadelphia Phillies for Larry Bowa and Ryne Sandberg.
- March 15, 1982: Mike Tyson was released by the Chicago Cubs.
- March 26, 1982: Paul Mirabella, a player to be named later, and cash were traded by the Cubs to the Texas Rangers for Bump Wills. The Cubs completed the trade by sending Paul Semall (minors) to the Rangers on April 21.

== Regular season ==
=== Season standings ===
NL East
| Team | W | L | Pct. | GB | Home | Road |
|---|---|---|---|---|---|---|
| St. Louis Cardinals | 92 | 70 | .568 | — | 46‍–‍35 | 46‍–‍35 |
| Philadelphia Phillies | 89 | 73 | .549 | 3 | 51‍–‍30 | 38‍–‍43 |
| Montreal Expos | 86 | 76 | .531 | 6 | 40‍–‍41 | 46‍–‍35 |
| Pittsburgh Pirates | 84 | 78 | .519 | 8 | 42‍–‍39 | 42‍–‍39 |
| Chicago Cubs | 73 | 89 | .451 | 19 | 38‍–‍43 | 35‍–‍46 |
| New York Mets | 65 | 97 | .401 | 27 | 33‍–‍48 | 32‍–‍49 |

=== Record vs. opponents ===
1982 National League record Sources:
| Team | ATL | CHC | CIN | HOU | LAD | MON | NYM | PHI | PIT | SD | SF | STL |
|---|---|---|---|---|---|---|---|---|---|---|---|---|
| Atlanta | — | 8–4 | 14–4 | 10–8 | 7–11 | 5–7 | 9–3 | 6–6 | 4–8 | 11–7 | 8–10 | 7–5 |
| Chicago | 4–8 | — | 6–6 | 9–3 | 5–7 | 6–12 | 9–9 | 9–9 | 9–9 | 4–8 | 6–6 | 6–12 |
| Cincinnati | 4–14 | 6–6 | — | 7–11 | 7–11 | 4–8 | 7–5 | 5–7 | 4–8 | 6–12 | 6–12 | 5–7 |
| Houston | 8–10 | 3–9 | 11–7 | — | 7–11 | 4–8 | 8–4 | 7–5 | 9–3 | 9–9 | 5–13 | 6–6 |
| Los Angeles | 11–7 | 7–5 | 11–7 | 11–7 | — | 8–4 | 6–6 | 4–8 | 5–7 | 9–9 | 9–9 | 7–5 |
| Montreal | 7–5 | 12–6 | 8–4 | 8–4 | 4–8 | — | 11–7 | 8–10 | 7–11 | 7–5 | 4–8 | 10–8 |
| New York | 3–9 | 9–9 | 5–7 | 4–8 | 6–6 | 7–11 | — | 7–11 | 8–10 | 6–6 | 4–8 | 6–12 |
| Philadelphia | 6-6 | 9–9 | 7–5 | 5–7 | 8–4 | 10–8 | 11–7 | — | 9–9 | 7–5 | 10–2 | 7–11 |
| Pittsburgh | 8–4 | 9–9 | 8–4 | 3–9 | 7–5 | 11–7 | 10–8 | 9–9 | — | 6–6 | 6–6 | 7–11 |
| San Diego | 7–11 | 8–4 | 12–6 | 9–9 | 9–9 | 5–7 | 6–6 | 5–7 | 6–6 | — | 10–8 | 4–8 |
| San Francisco | 10–8 | 6–6 | 12–6 | 13–5 | 9–9 | 8–4 | 8–4 | 2–10 | 6–6 | 8–10 | — | 5–7 |
| St. Louis | 5–7 | 12–6 | 7–5 | 6–6 | 5–7 | 8–10 | 12–6 | 11–7 | 11–7 | 8–4 | 7–5 | — |

=== Notable transactions ===
- April 1, 1982: Bill Caudill was sent by the Cubs to the New York Yankees to partially complete an earlier deal (the Chicago Cubs sent players to be named later to the Yankees for Pat Tabler) made on August 19, 1981.
- April 9, 1982: Randy Stein was signed as a free agent by the Cubs.
- June 7, 1982: Gary Varsho was drafted by the Cubs in the 5th round of the 1982 Major League Baseball draft. Player signed June 12, 1982.
- August 2, 1982: The Chicago Cubs sent Jay Howell to the New York Yankees to complete the August 19, 1981, trade noted above.

== Roster ==
1982 Chicago Cubs
Roster
| Pitchers: 47 Doug Bird; 39 Bill Campbell; 50 Tom Filer; 38 Willie Hernández; 31 Fergie Jenkins; 37 Ken Kravec; 32 Dan Larson; 34 Randy Martz; 48 Dickie Noles; 36 Mike Proly; 33 Allen Ripley; 43 Herman Segelke; 46 Lee Smith; 43 Randy Stein; 41 Dick Tidrow | Catchers: 9 Butch Benton; 9 Larry Cox; 7 Jody Davis; Infielders: 1 Larry Bowa; 22 Bill Buckner; 20 Scott Fletcher; 15 Junior Kennedy; 23 Ryne Sandberg; 19 Pat Tabler; 17 Bump Wills | Outfielders: 11 Dan Briggs; 30 Héctor Cruz; 10 Leon Durham; 27 Mel Hall; 28 Steve Henderson; 21 Jay Johnstone; 29 Bob Molinaro; 24 Jerry Morales; 6 Keith Moreland; 18 Scot Thompson; 21 Ty Waller; 25 Gary Woods | Manager: 4 Lee Elia; Coaches: 3 Billy Connors; 8 Tom Harmon; 5 Gordon Mackenzie; 2 John Vukovich |

== Player stats ==
| = Indicates team leader |

| = Indicates league leader |

=== Batting ===
==== Starters by position ====
Note: Pos = Position; G = Games played; AB = At bats; H = Hits; Avg. = Batting average; HR = Home runs; RBI = Runs batted in

| Pos | Player | G | AB | H | Avg. | HR | RBI |
|---|---|---|---|---|---|---|---|
| C | Jody Davis | 130 | 418 | 109 | .261 | 12 | 52 |
| 1B | Bill Buckner | 161 | 657 | 201 | .306 | 15 | 105 |
| 2B | Bump Wills | 128 | 419 | 114 | .272 | 6 | 38 |
| SS | Larry Bowa | 142 | 499 | 123 | .246 | 0 | 29 |
| 3B | Ryne Sandberg | 156 | 635 | 172 | .271 | 7 | 54 |
| LF | Steve Henderson | 92 | 257 | 60 | .233 | 2 | 29 |
| CF | Gary Woods | 117 | 245 | 66 | .269 | 4 | 30 |
| RF | Leon Durham | 148 | 539 | 168 | .312 | 22 | 90 |

==== Other batters ====
Note: G = Games played; AB = At bats; H = Hits; Avg. = Batting average; HR = Home runs; RBI = Runs batted in

| Player | G | AB | H | Avg. | HR | RBI |
|---|---|---|---|---|---|---|
| Keith Moreland | 138 | 476 | 124 | .261 | 15 | 68 |
| Jay Johnstone | 98 | 269 | 67 | .249 | 10 | 43 |
| Junior Kennedy | 105 | 242 | 53 | .219 | 2 | 25 |
| Jerry Morales | 65 | 116 | 33 | .284 | 4 | 30 |
| Pat Tabler | 25 | 85 | 20 | .235 | 1 | 7 |
| Mel Hall | 24 | 80 | 21 | .263 | 0 | 4 |
| Scot Thompson | 49 | 74 | 27 | .365 | 0 | 7 |
| Bob Molinaro | 65 | 66 | 13 | .197 | 1 | 12 |
| Dan Briggs | 48 | 48 | 6 | .125 | 0 | 1 |
| Scott Fletcher | 11 | 24 | 4 | .167 | 0 | 1 |
| Ty Waller | 17 | 21 | 5 | .238 | 0 | 1 |
| Héctor Cruz | 17 | 19 | 4 | .211 | 0 | 0 |
| Butch Benton | 4 | 7 | 1 | .143 | 0 | 1 |
| Larry Cox | 2 | 4 | 0 | .000 | 0 | 0 |

=== Pitching ===
==== Starting pitchers ====
Note: G = Games pitched; IP = Innings pitched; W = Wins; L = Losses; ERA = Earned run average; SO = Strikeouts

| Player | G | IP | W | L | ERA | SO |
|---|---|---|---|---|---|---|
| Ferguson Jenkins | 34 | 217.1 | 14 | 15 | 3.15 | 134 |
| Doug Bird | 35 | 191.0 | 9 | 14 | 5.14 | 71 |
| Dickie Noles | 31 | 171.0 | 10 | 13 | 4.42 | 85 |
| Randy Martz | 28 | 147.2 | 11 | 10 | 4.21 | 40 |
| Tom Filer | 8 | 40.2 | 1 | 2 | 5.53 | 15 |

==== Other pitchers ====
Note: G = Games pitched; IP = Innings pitched; W = Wins; L = Losses; ERA = Earned run average; SO = Strikeouts

| Player | G | IP | W | L | ERA | SO |
|---|---|---|---|---|---|---|
| Allen Ripley | 28 | 122.2 | 5 | 7 | 4.26 | 57 |
| Dan Larson | 12 | 39.2 | 0 | 4 | 5.67 | 22 |
| Ken Kravec | 13 | 25.0 | 1 | 1 | 6.12 | 20 |

==== Relief pitchers ====
Note: G = Games pitched; W = Wins; L = Losses; SV = Saves; ERA = Earned run average; SO = Strikeouts

| Player | G | W | L | SV | ERA | SO |
|---|---|---|---|---|---|---|
| Lee Smith | 72 | 2 | 5 | 17 | 2.69 | 99 |
| Willie Hernández | 75 | 4 | 6 | 10 | 3.00 | 54 |
| Dick Tidrow | 65 | 8 | 3 | 6 | 3.39 | 62 |
| Bill Campbell | 62 | 3 | 6 | 8 | 3.69 | 71 |
| Mike Proly | 44 | 5 | 3 | 1 | 2.30 | 24 |
| Randy Stein | 6 | 0 | 0 | 0 | 3.48 | 6 |
| Herman Segelke | 3 | 0 | 0 | 0 | 8.31 | 4 |

== Farm system ==
| Level | Team | League | Manager |
|---|---|---|---|
| AAA | Iowa Cubs | American Association | Jim Napier |
| AA | Midland Cubs | Texas League | Brian Murphy |
| A | Salinas Spurs | California League | Rich Morales |
| A | Quad Cities Cubs | Midwest League | George Enright |
| A-Short Season | Geneva Cubs | New York–Penn League | Tony Franklin |
| Rookie | GCL Cubs | Gulf Coast League | Jim Fairey |
