= 1981 Chicago Cubs season =

1981 Chicago Cubs
- League: National League
- Division: East
- Ballpark: Wrigley Field
- City: Chicago
- Record: First half: 15–37 (.288); Second half: 23–28 (.451); Overall: 38–65 (.369)
- Divisional place: First half: 6th Second half: 6th Overall: 6th
- Owners: William Wrigley III, Tribune Company
- General managers: Bob Kennedy, Herman Franks, Dallas Green
- Managers: Joey Amalfitano
- Television: WGN-TV (Jack Brickhouse, Lou Boudreau, Milo Hamilton)
- Radio: WGN (Vince Lloyd, Lou Boudreau)
- Stats: ESPN.com; Baseball Reference

The 1981 Chicago Cubs season was the 110th season of the Chicago Cubs franchise, the 106th in the National League and the 66th at Wrigley Field. The Cubs finished the first half in last place at 15–37, 17½ games behind the Philadelphia Phillies, and the second half in fifth place at 23–28, six games behind the eventual NL East Champion Montreal Expos in the National League East. It was also the final season for the Cubs under the Wrigley family ownership, as the Tribune Company took over the club late in the year.

== Offseason ==
- December 9, 1980: Bruce Sutter was traded by the Cubs to the St. Louis Cardinals for Leon Durham, Ken Reitz, and a player to be named later. The Cardinals completed the deal by sending Tye Waller to the Cubs on December 22.
- December 12, 1980: Jerry Martin, Jesús Figueroa and a player to be named later was traded by the Cubs to the San Francisco Giants for Joe Strain and Philip Nastu. The Cubs completed the deal by sending Mike Turgeon (minors) to the Giants on August 11, 1981.
- February 26, 1981: George Riley was released by the Cubs.
- March 28, 1981: Dennis Lamp was traded by the Cubs to the Chicago White Sox for Ken Kravec.

== Regular season ==
=== Season standings ===
NL East
| Team | W | L | Pct. | GB | Home | Road |
|---|---|---|---|---|---|---|
| St. Louis Cardinals | 59 | 43 | .578 | — | 32‍–‍21 | 27‍–‍22 |
| Montreal Expos | 60 | 48 | .556 | 2 | 38‍–‍18 | 22‍–‍30 |
| Philadelphia Phillies | 59 | 48 | .551 | 2½ | 36‍–‍19 | 23‍–‍29 |
| Pittsburgh Pirates | 46 | 56 | .451 | 13 | 22‍–‍28 | 24‍–‍28 |
| New York Mets | 41 | 62 | .398 | 18½ | 24‍–‍27 | 17‍–‍35 |
| Chicago Cubs | 38 | 65 | .369 | 21½ | 27‍–‍30 | 11‍–‍35 |

| NL East First Half Standings | W | L | Pct. | GB |
|---|---|---|---|---|
| Philadelphia Phillies | 34 | 21 | .618 | — |
| St. Louis Cardinals | 30 | 20 | .600 | 1 1/2 |
| Montreal Expos | 30 | 25 | .545 | 4 |
| Pittsburgh Pirates | 25 | 23 | .521 | 5 1/2 |
| New York Mets | 17 | 34 | .333 | 15 |
| Chicago Cubs | 15 | 37 | .288 | 17 1/2 |

| NL East Second Half Standings | W | L | Pct. | GB |
|---|---|---|---|---|
| Montreal Expos | 30 | 23 | .566 | — |
| St. Louis Cardinals | 29 | 23 | .558 | 1/2 |
| Philadelphia Phillies | 25 | 27 | .481 | 4 1/2 |
| New York Mets | 24 | 28 | .462 | 5 1/2 |
| Chicago Cubs | 23 | 28 | .451 | 6 |
| Pittsburgh Pirates | 21 | 33 | .389 | 9 1/2 |

=== Record vs. opponents ===
1981 National League record Sources:
| Team | ATL | CHC | CIN | HOU | LAD | MON | NYM | PHI | PIT | SD | SF | STL |
|---|---|---|---|---|---|---|---|---|---|---|---|---|
| Atlanta | — | 3–2–1 | 6–5 | 4–8 | 7–7 | 3–7 | 3–3 | 4–5 | 2–3 | 9–6 | 5–7 | 4–3 |
| Chicago | 2–3–1 | — | 1–5 | 1–6 | 6–4 | 4–7 | 5–8–1 | 2–10 | 4–10 | 3–3 | 5–5 | 5–4–1 |
| Cincinnati | 5–6 | 5–1 | — | 8–4 | 8–8 | 5–4 | 7–3 | 5–2 | 4–2 | 10–2 | 9–5 | 0–5 |
| Houston | 8–4 | 6–1 | 4–8 | — | 4–8 | 5–2 | 6–3 | 4–6 | 2–4 | 11–3 | 9–6 | 2–4 |
| Los Angeles | 7–7 | 4–6 | 8–8 | 8–4 | — | 5–2 | 5–1 | 3–3 | 5–1 | 6–5 | 7–5 | 5–5 |
| Montreal | 7–3 | 7–4 | 4–5 | 2–5 | 2–5 | — | 9–3 | 7–4 | 10–3 | 4–2 | 2–5 | 6–9 |
| New York | 3–3 | 8–5–1 | 3–7 | 3–6 | 1–5 | 3–9 | — | 7–7 | 3–6–1 | 2–5 | 2–4 | 6–5 |
| Philadelphia | 5-4 | 10–2 | 2–5 | 6–4 | 3–3 | 4–7 | 7–7 | — | 7–5 | 4–2 | 4–3 | 7–6 |
| Pittsburgh | 3–2 | 10–4 | 2–4 | 4–2 | 1–5 | 3–10 | 6–3–1 | 5–7 | — | 6–4 | 3–7 | 3–8 |
| San Diego | 6–9 | 3–3 | 2–10 | 3–11 | 5–6 | 2–4 | 5–2 | 2–4 | 4–6 | — | 6–7 | 3–7 |
| San Francisco | 7–5 | 5–5 | 5–9 | 6–9 | 5–7 | 5–2 | 4–2 | 3–4 | 7–3 | 7–6 | — | 2–3 |
| St. Louis | 3–4 | 4–5–1 | 5–0 | 4–2 | 5–5 | 9–6 | 5–6 | 6–7 | 8–3 | 7–3 | 3–2 | — |

=== Notable transactions ===
- April 6, 1981: Butch Benton was acquired by the Cubs from the New York Mets as part of a conditional deal.
- June 8, 1981: Joe Carter was drafted by the Cubs in the 1st round (2nd pick) of the 1981 Major League Baseball draft. Player signed June 12, 1981.
- June 12, 1981: Rick Reuschel was traded by the Cubs to the New York Yankees for Doug Bird, a player to be named later, and $400,000. The Yankees completed the trade by sending Mike Griffin on August 5.
- August 19, 1981: The Cubs traded players to be named later to the New York Yankees for Pat Tabler. The Cubs completed the trade by sending Bill Caudill to the Yankees on April 1, 1982, and Jay Howell to the Yankees on August 2, 1982.

=== Roster ===
1981 Chicago Cubs
Roster
| Pitchers: 47 Doug Bird; 35 Doug Capilla; 36 Bill Caudill; 49 Rawly Eastwick; 40 Dave Geisel; 50 Mike Griffin; 38 Willie Hernández; 45 Jay Howell; 37 Ken Kravec; 39 Mike Krukow; 34 Randy Martz; 40 Lynn McGlothen; 48 Rick Reuschel; 46 Lee Smith; 41 Dick Tidrow | Catchers: 9 Tim Blackwell; 7 Jody Davis; 8 Barry Foote; 16 Bill Hayes; Infielders: 22 Bill Buckner; 27 Héctor Cruz; 11 Iván DeJesús; 15 Steve Dillard; 20 Scott Fletcher; 44 Ken Reitz; 20 Joe Strain; 19 Pat Tabler; 18 Mike Tyson; 21 Tye Waller | Outfielders: 25 Bobby Bonds; 10 Leon Durham; 32 Mel Hall; 28 Steve Henderson; 30 Carlos Lezcano; 33 Mike Lum; 24 Jerry Morales; 25,29 Scot Thompson; 23 Jim Tracy; Other batters: 47 Gene Krug | Manager: 5 Joey Amalfitano; Coaches: 3 Gene Clines; 4 Jack Hiatt; 2 Peanuts Lowrey; 6 Les Moss; 1 Cookie Rojas |

== Player stats ==
| = Indicates team leader |

=== Batting ===
==== Starters by position ====
Note: Pos = Position; G = Games played; AB = At bats; H = Hits; Avg. = Batting average; HR = Home runs; RBI = Runs batted in

| Pos | Player | G | AB | H | Avg. | HR | RBI |
|---|---|---|---|---|---|---|---|
| C | Jody Davis | 56 | 180 | 46 | .256 | 4 | 21 |
| 1B | Bill Buckner | 106 | 421 | 131 | .311 | 10 | 75 |
| 2B | Pat Tabler | 35 | 101 | 19 | .188 | 1 | 5 |
| SS | Iván DeJesús | 106 | 403 | 78 | .194 | 0 | 13 |
| 3B | Ken Reitz | 82 | 260 | 56 | .215 | 2 | 28 |
| LF | Steve Henderson | 82 | 287 | 84 | .293 | 5 | 35 |
| CF | Jerry Morales | 84 | 245 | 70 | .286 | 1 | 25 |
| RF | Leon Durham | 87 | 328 | 95 | .290 | 10 | 35 |

==== Other batters ====
Note: G = Games played; AB = At bats; H = Hits; Avg. = Batting average; HR = Home runs; RBI = Runs batted in

| Player | G | AB | H | Avg. | HR | RBI |
|---|---|---|---|---|---|---|
| Bobby Bonds | 45 | 163 | 35 | .215 | 6 | 19 |
| Tim Blackwell | 58 | 158 | 37 | .234 | 1 | 11 |
| Steve Dillard | 53 | 119 | 26 | .218 | 2 | 11 |
| Scot Thompson | 57 | 115 | 19 | .165 | 0 | 8 |
| Héctor Cruz | 53 | 109 | 25 | .229 | 7 | 15 |
| Mike Tyson | 50 | 92 | 17 | .185 | 2 | 8 |
| Joe Strain | 25 | 74 | 14 | .189 | 0 | 1 |
| Tye Waller | 30 | 71 | 19 | .268 | 3 | 13 |
| Jim Tracy | 45 | 63 | 15 | .238 | 0 | 5 |
| Mike Lum | 41 | 58 | 14 | .241 | 2 | 7 |
| Scott Fletcher | 19 | 46 | 10 | .217 | 0 | 1 |
| Barry Foote | 9 | 22 | 0 | .000 | 0 | 1 |
| Carlos Lezcano | 7 | 14 | 1 | .071 | 0 | 2 |
| Mel Hall | 10 | 11 | 1 | .091 | 1 | 2 |
| Gene Krug | 7 | 5 | 2 | .400 | 0 | 0 |
| Bill Hayes | 1 | 0 | 0 | ---- | 0 | 0 |

=== Pitching ===
==== Starting pitchers ====
Note: G = Games pitched; IP = Innings pitched; W = Wins; L = Losses; ERA = Earned run average; SO = Strikeouts

| Player | G | IP | W | L | ERA | SO |
|---|---|---|---|---|---|---|
| Mike Krukow | 25 | 144.1 | 9 | 9 | 3.68 | 101 |
| Rick Reuschel | 13 | 85.2 | 4 | 7 | 3.47 | 53 |
| Doug Bird | 12 | 75.1 | 4 | 5 | 3.58 | 34 |

==== Other pitchers ====
Note: G = Games pitched; IP = Innings pitched; W = Wins; L = Losses; ERA = Earned run average; SO = Strikeouts

| Player | G | IP | W | L | ERA | SO |
|---|---|---|---|---|---|---|
| Randy Martz | 33 | 107.2 | 5 | 7 | 3.68 | 32 |
| Ken Kravec | 24 | 78.1 | 1 | 6 | 5.06 | 50 |
| Bill Caudill | 30 | 71.0 | 1 | 5 | 5.83 | 45 |
| Lynn McGlothen | 20 | 54.2 | 1 | 4 | 4.77 | 26 |
| Mike Griffin | 16 | 52.0 | 2 | 5 | 4.50 | 20 |
| Jay Howell | 10 | 22.1 | 2 | 0 | 4.84 | 10 |
| Dave Geisel | 11 | 16.0 | 2 | 0 | 0.56 | 7 |

==== Relief pitchers ====
Note: G = Games pitched; W = Wins; L = Losses; SV = Saves; ERA = Earned run average; SO = Strikeouts

| Player | G | W | L | SV | ERA | SO |
|---|---|---|---|---|---|---|
| Dick Tidrow | 51 | 3 | 10 | 9 | 5.06 | 39 |
| Doug Capilla | 42 | 1 | 0 | 0 | 3.18 | 28 |
| Lee Smith | 40 | 3 | 6 | 1 | 3.51 | 50 |
| Rawly Eastwick | 30 | 0 | 1 | 1 | 2.28 | 24 |
| Willie Hernández | 12 | 0 | 0 | 2 | 3.95 | 13 |

== Farm system ==
| Level | Team | League | Manager |
|---|---|---|---|
| AAA | Iowa Cubs | American Association | Randy Hundley and Roy Hartsfield |
| AA | Midland Cubs | Texas League | Roy Hartsfield and George Enright |
| A | Quad Cities Cubs | Midwest League | Rich Morales |
| A-Short Season | Geneva Cubs | New York–Penn League | Bob Hartsfield |
| Rookie | GCL Cubs | Gulf Coast League | Hugh Yancy |
