= 1981 Philadelphia Phillies season =

Major League Baseball season

1981 Philadelphia Phillies
- League: National League
- Division: East
- Ballpark: Veterans Stadium
- City: Philadelphia
- Owners: Bill Giles
- General managers: Paul Owens
- Managers: Dallas Green
- Television: WPHL-TV; PRISM
- Radio: KYW (Harry Kalas, Richie Ashburn, Andy Musser, Chris Wheeler, Tim McCarver)

The 1981 Philadelphia Phillies season was the 99th season in the history of the franchise, and the 11th season for the Philadelphia Phillies at Veterans Stadium.

== Offseason ==
- November 25, 1980: Rick Schu was signed as an amateur free agent by the Phillies.
- December 8, 1980: George Bell was drafted from the Phillies by the Toronto Blue Jays in the 1980 rule 5 draft.
- December 22, 1980: Del Unser was signed as a free agent by the Phillies.
- March 1, 1981: Randy Lerch was traded by the Phillies to the Milwaukee Brewers for Dick Davis.
- March 25, 1981: Bob Walk was traded by the Phillies to the Atlanta Braves for Gary Matthews.

== Regular season ==
- April 29, 1981: Phillies pitcher Steve Carlton struck out Tim Wallach of the Montreal Expos for the 3000th strikeout of his career.
- August 10, 1981: First baseman Pete Rose records his 3,631st hit of his career, passing Stan Musial to become the all-time hit leader in the National League.

=== Season standings ===
NL East
Team	W	L	Pct.	GB	Home	Road
St. Louis Cardinals	59	43	.578	—	32‍–‍21	27‍–‍22
Montreal Expos	60	48	.556	2	38‍–‍18	22‍–‍30
Philadelphia Phillies	59	48	.551	2½	36‍–‍19	23‍–‍29
Pittsburgh Pirates	46	56	.451	13	22‍–‍28	24‍–‍28
New York Mets	41	62	.398	18½	24‍–‍27	17‍–‍35
Chicago Cubs	38	65	.369	21½	27‍–‍30	11‍–‍35

NL East First Half Standings	W	L	Pct.	GB
Philadelphia Phillies	34	21	.618	—
St. Louis Cardinals	30	20	.600	1 1/2
Montreal Expos	30	25	.545	4
Pittsburgh Pirates	25	23	.521	5 1/2
New York Mets	17	34	.333	15
Chicago Cubs	15	37	.288	17 1/2

NL East Second Half Standings	W	L	Pct.	GB
Montreal Expos	30	23	.566	—
St. Louis Cardinals	29	23	.558	1/2
Philadelphia Phillies	25	27	.481	4 1/2
New York Mets	24	28	.462	5 1/2
Chicago Cubs	23	28	.451	6
Pittsburgh Pirates	21	33	.389	9 1/2

=== Record vs. opponents ===
1981 National League record Sources:
Team	ATL	CHC	CIN	HOU	LAD	MON	NYM	PHI	PIT	SD	SF	STL
Atlanta	—	3–2–1	6–5	4–8	7–7	3–7	3–3	4–5	2–3	9–6	5–7	4–3
Chicago	2–3–1	—	1–5	1–6	6–4	4–7	5–8–1	2–10	4–10	3–3	5–5	5–4–1
Cincinnati	5–6	5–1	—	8–4	8–8	5–4	7–3	5–2	4–2	10–2	9–5	0–5
Houston	8–4	6–1	4–8	—	4–8	5–2	6–3	4–6	2–4	11–3	9–6	2–4
Los Angeles	7–7	4–6	8–8	8–4	—	5–2	5–1	3–3	5–1	6–5	7–5	5–5
Montreal	7–3	7–4	4–5	2–5	2–5	—	9–3	7–4	10–3	4–2	2–5	6–9
New York	3–3	8–5–1	3–7	3–6	1–5	3–9	—	7–7	3–6–1	2–5	2–4	6–5
Philadelphia	5-4	10–2	2–5	6–4	3–3	4–7	7–7	—	7–5	4–2	4–3	7–6
Pittsburgh	3–2	10–4	2–4	4–2	1–5	3–10	6–3–1	5–7	—	6–4	3–7	3–8
San Diego	6–9	3–3	2–10	3–11	5–6	2–4	5–2	2–4	4–6	—	6–7	3–7
San Francisco	7–5	5–5	5–9	6–9	5–7	5–2	4–2	3–4	7–3	7–6	—	2–3
St. Louis	3–4	4–5–1	5–0	4–2	5–5	9–6	5–6	6–7	8–3	7–3	3–2	—

=== Notable transactions ===
- June 8, 1981: Vince Coleman was drafted by the Phillies in the 20th round of the 1981 Major League Baseball draft, but did not sign.
- July 12, 1981: Mike LaValliere was signed by the Phillies as an amateur free agent.

=== 1981 Game Log ===
Legend
	Phillies win
	Phillies loss
	Postponement
**Bold**	Phillies team member

1981 Game Log
First Half: 34–21; Second Half: 25–27; Overall Record: 59–48
April (12–6)

#	Date	Opponent	Score	Win	Loss	Save	Attendance	Record
1	April 8	@ Reds	2–3	Tom Hume (1–0)	**Sparky Lyle** (0–1)	None	51,716	0–1
2	April 11	@ Cardinals	5–2	**Dick Ruthven** (1–0)	Bob Forsch (0–1)	None	38,473	1–1
3	April 12	@ Cardinals	3–7	Lary Sorensen (1–0)	**Larry Christenson** (0–1)	Bruce Sutter (1)	21,462	1–2
4	April 13	Pirates	5–1	**Steve Carlton** (1–0)	John Candelaria (0–1)	None	60,404	2–2
5	April 15	Pirates	4–3 (11)	**Tug McGraw** (1–0)	Enrique Romo (0–1)	None	27,450	3–2
6	April 16	Pirates	5–3	**Dick Ruthven** (2–0)	Don Robinson (0–1)	**Tug McGraw** (1)	26,780	4–2
7	April 17	Cubs	6–2	**Larry Christenson** (1–1)	Ken Kravec (0–1)	None	21,948	5–2
8	April 18	Cubs	4–3 (10)	**Steve Carlton** (2–0)	Lee Smith (0–1)	None	27,780	6–2
9	April 19	Cubs	7–3	**Nino Espinosa** (1–0)	Rick Reuschel (0–2)	None	30,204	7–2
10	April 20	@ Expos	8–9	Steve Rogers (1–0)	**Tug McGraw** (1–1)	Woodie Fryman (2)	24,817	7–3
11	April 21	@ Expos	3–10	Scott Sanderson (2–0)	**Dick Ruthven** (2–1)	None	10,887	7–4
12	April 22	@ Expos	3–4 (11)	Elías Sosa (1–0)	**Tug McGraw** (1–2)	None	14,176	7–5
13	April 24	@ Cubs	6–4	**Steve Carlton** (3–0)	Rick Reuschel (0–3)	**Ron Reed** (1)	6,274	8–5
14	April 25	@ Cubs	7–5	**Sparky Lyle** (1–1)	Dick Tidrow (1–2)	None	10,990	9–5
15	April 26	@ Cubs	6–2	**Marty Bystrom** (1–0)	Bill Caudill (0–1)	None	10,093	10–5
16	April 27	Expos	3–1	**Dick Ruthven** (3–1)	Bill Gullickson (1–1)	None	27,347	11–5
17	April 28	Expos	3–6	Steve Ratzer (1–0)	**Larry Christenson** (1–2)	Elías Sosa (1)	26,192	11–6
18	April 29	Expos	6–2	**Steve Carlton** (4–0)	Steve Rogers (2–1)	None	30,142	12–6

May (15–13)

#	Date	Opponent	Score	Win	Loss	Save	Attendance	Record
–	May 1	Giants	Postponed (rain); Makeup: May 2 as a traditional double-header					
19	May 2 (1)	Giants	2–6	Doyle Alexander (4–1)	**Nino Espinosa** (1–1)	Greg Minton (4)	see 2nd game	12–7
20	May 2 (2)	Giants	3–1	**Marty Bystrom** (2–0)	Ed Whitson (0–3)	None	27,376	13–7
21	May 3	Giants	7–5	**Dick Ruthven** (4–1)	Gary Lavelle (0–2)	**Tug McGraw** (2)	41,283	14–7
22	May 4	Giants	6–4	**Steve Carlton** (5–0)	Allen Ripley (1–3)	None	25,492	15–7
23	May 5	Dodgers	8–7	**Sparky Lyle** (2–1)	Bobby Castillo (0–3)	None	27,241	16–7
24	May 6	Dodgers	1–2	Burt Hooton (4–0)	**Nino Espinosa** (1–2)	None	25,850	16–8
25	May 7	Dodgers	1–2	Jerry Reuss (3–1)	**Marty Bystrom** (2–1)	None	29,259	16–9
26	May 8	Padres	11–7	**Sparky Lyle** (3–1)	Gary Lucas (2–3)	None	30,830	17–9
27	May 9	Padres	9–6	**Steve Carlton** (6–0)	Tim Lollar (1–3)	None	30,907	18–9
28	May 10	Padres	4–8	Steve Mura (1–4)	**Larry Christenson** (1–3)	Gary Lucas (5)	40,447	18–10
29	May 12	@ Giants	0–4	Doyle Alexander (5–2)	**Nino Espinosa** (1–3)	None	10,307	18–11
30	May 13	@ Giants	2–5	Allen Ripley (3–3)	**Marty Bystrom** (2–2)	Greg Minton (6)	6,946	18–12
31	May 14	@ Giants	3–1	**Dick Ruthven** (5–1)	Vida Blue (3–3)	**Tug McGraw** (3)	6,561	19–12
32	May 15	@ Padres	2–1	**Steve Carlton** (7–0)	Steve Mura (1–5)	None	15,939	20–12
33	May 16	@ Padres	1–2	John Littlefield (1–2)	**Tug McGraw** (1–3)	None	40,656	20–13
34	May 17	@ Padres	6–3	**Nino Espinosa** (2–3)	Juan Eichelberger (3–2)	None	18,330	21–13
35	May 18	@ Dodgers	4–0	**Marty Bystrom** (3–2)	Fernando Valenzuela (8–1)	None	52,439	22–13
36	May 19	@ Dodgers	3–2	**Dick Ruthven** (6–1)	Bob Welch (2–2)	None	43,812	23–13
37	May 20	@ Dodgers	2–3 (10)	Steve Howe (4–1)	**Tug McGraw** (1–4)	None	50,917	23–14
38	May 22	@ Pirates	1–3	Pascual Pérez (1–0)	**Larry Christenson** (1–4)	None	20,695	23–15
39	May 23	@ Pirates	6–4	**Mike Proly** (1–0)	Kent Tekulve (0–3)	**Ron Reed** (2)	20,340	24–15
40	May 24	@ Pirates	1–7	Jim Bibby (3–2)	**Marty Bystrom** (3–3)	Víctor Cruz (1)	21,771	24–16
41	May 25	@ Mets	3–13	Greg A. Harris (1–0)	**Dick Ruthven** (6–2)	Jeff Reardon (2)	20,469	24–17
42	May 26	@ Mets	7–5	**Ron Reed** (1–0)	Neil Allen (3–2)	**Tug McGraw** (4)	13,973	25–17
43	May 27	@ Mets	1–3	Pat Zachry (5–5)	**Larry Christenson** (1–5)	None	10,930	25–18
44	May 29	Cardinals	4–11	Bob Forsch (5–2)	**Nino Espinosa** (2–4)	Mark Littell (1)	32,358	25–19
45	May 30	Cardinals	10–2	**Dick Ruthven** (7–2)	Lary Sorensen (4–4)	None	35,034	26–19
46	May 31	Cardinals	6–1	**Steve Carlton** (8–0)	Silvio Martínez (1–4)	None	54,103	27–19

June (7–2)

#	Date	Opponent	Score	Win	Loss	Save	Attendance	Record
47	June 1	Mets	5–4	**Sparky Lyle** (4–1)	Neil Allen (3–3)	**Tug McGraw** (5)	27,631	28–19
48	June 2	Mets	9–7	**Mike Proly** (2–0)	Ed Lynch (1–3)	**Ron Reed** (3)	25,375	29–19
49	June 3	Mets	2–6	Greg A. Harris (2–1)	**Dick Ruthven** (7–3)	Neil Allen (5)	27,588	29–20
50	June 5	@ Braves	1–4	Rick Mahler (3–1)	**Steve Carlton** (8–1)	Rick Camp (8)	17,059	29–21
51	June 6	@ Braves	3–0	**Larry Christenson** (2–5)	Tommy Boggs (1–9)	**Mike Proly** (1)	15,291	30–21
52	June 7	@ Braves	7–5	**Sparky Lyle** (5–1)	Gaylord Perry (5–4)	**Ron Reed** (4)	23,482	31–21
53	June 8	Astros	4–3	**Dick Ruthven** (8–3)	Don Sutton (4–6)	**Tug McGraw** (6)	31,664	32–21
54	June 9	Astros	10–3	**Marty Bystrom** (4–3)	Joe Niekro (6–5)	**Ron Reed** (5)	33,978	33–21
55	June 10	Astros	5–4	**Steve Carlton** (9–1)	Frank LaCorte (3–2)	**Tug McGraw** (7)	57,386	34–21
–	June 12	Braves	**Game cancelled: players' strike**					
–	June 13	Braves	**Game cancelled: players' strike**					
–	June 14	Braves	**Game cancelled: players' strike**					
–	June 15	Reds	**Game cancelled: players' strike**					
–	June 16	Reds	**Game cancelled: players' strike**					
–	June 17	@ Astros	**Game cancelled: players' strike**					
–	June 18	@ Astros	**Game cancelled: players' strike**					
–	June 19	@ Reds	**Game cancelled: players' strike**					
–	June 20	@ Reds	**Game cancelled: players' strike**					
–	June 21	@ Reds	**Game cancelled: players' strike**					
–	June 23	@ Cubs	**Game cancelled: players' strike**					
–	June 24	@ Cubs	**Game cancelled: players' strike**					
–	June 25	@ Cubs	**Game cancelled: players' strike**					
–	June 26	Pirates	**Game cancelled: players' strike**					
–	June 27	Pirates	**Game cancelled: players' strike**					
–	June 28	Pirates	**Game cancelled: players' strike**					
–	June 29	@ Cardinals	**Game cancelled: players' strike**					
–	June 30 (1)	@ Cardinals	**Game cancelled: players' strike**					
–	June 30 (2)	@ Cardinals	**Game cancelled: players' strike**					

July (0–0)

#	Date	Opponent	Score	Win	Loss	Save	Attendance	Record
–	July 1	@ Cardinals	Game cancelled: players' strike					
–	July 2	@ Cardinals	Game cancelled: players' strike					
–	July 3	Expos	Game cancelled: players' strike					
–	July 4	Expos	Game cancelled: players' strike					
–	July 5	Expos	Game cancelled: players' strike					
–	July 7	@ Pirates	Game cancelled: players' strike					
–	July 8	@ Pirates	Game cancelled: players' strike					
–	July 9	@ Pirates	Game cancelled: players' strike					
–	July 10	Mets	Game cancelled: players' strike					
–	July 11 (1)	Mets	Game cancelled: players' strike					
–	July 11 (2)	Mets	Game cancelled: players' strike					
–	July 12	Mets	Game cancelled: players' strike					
–	July 14	**1981 Major League Baseball All-Star Game at Cleveland Stadium in Cleveland** Cancelled (players' strike), then postponed to August 9						
–	July 16	Giants	Game cancelled: players' strike					
–	July 17	Giants	Game cancelled: players' strike					
–	July 18	Dodgers	Game cancelled: players' strike					
–	July 19	Dodgers	Game cancelled: players' strike					
–	July 20	Dodgers	Game cancelled: players' strike					
–	July 21	Padres	Game cancelled: players' strike					
–	July 22	Padres	Game cancelled: players' strike					
–	July 23	Padres	Game cancelled: players' strike					
–	July 24	@ Giants	Game cancelled: players' strike					
–	July 25	@ Giants	Game cancelled: players' strike					
–	July 26	@ Giants	Game cancelled: players' strike					
–	July 27	@ Padres	Game cancelled: players' strike					
–	July 28	@ Padres	Game cancelled: players' strike					
–	July 29	@ Padres	Game cancelled: players' strike					
–	July 31	@ Dodgers	Game cancelled: players' strike					

August (7–13)

#	Date	Opponent	Score	Win	Loss	Save	Attendance	Record (Overall Record)
–	August 1	@ Dodgers	**Game cancelled: players' strike**					
–	August 2	@ Dodgers	**Game cancelled: players' strike**					
–	August 4	Cubs	**Game cancelled: players' strike**					
–	August 5	Cubs	**Game cancelled: players' strike**					
–	August 6	Cubs	**Game cancelled: players' strike**					
–	August 7	@ Expos	**Game cancelled: players' strike**					
–	August 8	@ Expos	**Game cancelled: players' strike**					
–	August 9 (1)	@ Expos	**Game cancelled: players' strike**					
–	August 9 (2)	@ Expos	**Game cancelled: players' strike**					
–	August 9	**1981 Major League Baseball All-Star Game at Cleveland Stadium in Cleveland**						
56	August 10	Cardinals	3–7	Bob Forsch (7–2)	**Larry Christenson** (2–6)	Bruce Sutter (12)	60,561	0–1 (34–22)
57	August 11	Cardinals	6–5 (10)	**Ron Reed** (2–0)	Jim Kaat (3–2)	None	24,549	1–1 (35–22)
58	August 12	Cardinals	3–11	Bob Sykes (1–0)	**Dick Ruthven** (8–4)	Mark Littell (2)	23,566	1–2 (35–23)
59	August 13	Cardinals	2–5	John Martin (4–1)	**Steve Carlton** (9–2)	Bruce Sutter (13)	26,783	1–3 (35–24)
60	August 14	@ Mets	8–4	**Larry Christenson** (3–6)	Mike Scott (3–5)	**Mike Proly** (2)	34,136	2–3 (36–24)
61	August 15	@ Mets	1–3	Pete Falcone (2–3)	**Nino Espinosa** (2–5)	Neil Allen (8)	14,309	2–4 (36–25)
62	August 16	@ Mets	2–5	Pat Zachry (6–7)	**Dick Ruthven** (8–5)	Neil Allen (9)	21,635	2–5 (36–26)
63	August 18	@ Reds	1–3	Tom Seaver (8–2)	**Steve Carlton** (9–3)	Tom Hume (8)	25,363	2–6 (36–27)
64	August 19	@ Reds	3–6	Tom Hume (6–2)	**Sparky Lyle** (5–2)	None	23,133	2–7 (36–28)
65	August 21	Astros	5–4	**Sparky Lyle** (6–2)	Vern Ruhle (1–3)	**Tug McGraw** (8)	31,693	3–7 (37–28)
66	August 22	Astros	8–4	**Dick Ruthven** (9–5)	Joe Niekro (7–7)	None	35,199	4–7 (38–28)
67	August 23	Astros	6–0	**Steve Carlton** (10–3)	Bob Knepper (6–3)	None	30,630	5–7 (39–28)
68	August 24	Braves	7–5 (13)	**Tug McGraw** (2–4)	Al Hrabosky (0–1)	None	23,383	6–7 (40–28)
69	August 25	Braves	2–12	Phil Niekro (6–4)	**Mark Davis** (0–1)	None	33,383	6–8 (40–29)
70	August 26	Braves	3–5 (10)	Rick Camp (7–1)	**Ron Reed** (2–1)	None	28,283	6–9 (40–30)
71	August 28	@ Astros	2–3 (10)	Dave Smith (2–3)	**Sparky Lyle** (6–3)	None	29,482	6–10 (40–31)
72	August 29 (1)	@ Astros	1–6	Vern Ruhle (2–3)	**Mark Davis** (0–2)	None	see 2nd game	6–11 (40–32)
73	August 29 (2)	@ Astros	1–2	Billy Smith (1–0)	**Dickie Noles** (0–1)	Frank LaCorte (4)	33,327	6–12 (40–33)
74	August 30	@ Astros	4–5 (10)	Dave Smith (3–3)	**Sparky Lyle** (6–4)	None	23,102	6–13 (40–34)
75	August 31	@ Braves	11–8	**Dick Ruthven** (10–5)	Gaylord Perry (6–5)	**Ron Reed** (6)	8,207	7–13 (41–34)

September (16–12)

#	Date	Opponent	Score	Win	Loss	Save	Attendance	Record (Overall Record)
76	September 1	@ Braves	3–0	**Steve Carlton** (11–3)	Rick Mahler (4–5)	None	3,374	8–13 (42–34)
77	September 2	@ Braves	2–3	Gene Garber (4–3)	**Warren Brusstar** (0–1)	None	6,232	8–14 (42–35)
78	September 3	Reds	3–9	Bruce Berenyi (7–4)	**Mark Davis** (0–3)	None	26,540	8–15 (42–36)
79	September 4	Reds	7–6	**Sparky Lyle** (7–4)	Doug Bair (2–2)	**Tug McGraw** (9)	25,020	9–15 (43–36)
80	September 5	Reds	5–4	**Ron Reed** (3–1)	Mario Soto (8–8)	None	41,845	10–15 (44–36)
81	September 6	Reds	4–5	Tom Hume (7–3)	**Sparky Lyle** (7–5)	Joe Price (2)	30,366	10–16 (44–37)
82	September 7	Expos	4–5	Woodie Fryman (5–2)	**Mike Proly** (2–1)	Jeff Reardon (5)	31,401	10–17 (44–38)
83	September 8	Expos	10–5	**Dan Larson** (1–0)	Scott Sanderson (7–6)	None	11,812	11–17 (45–38)
84	September 9	Expos	11–8	**Ron Reed** (4–1)	Woodie Fryman (5–3)	**Sparky Lyle** (1)	25,468	12–17 (46–38)
85	September 11	@ Pirates	8–0	**Steve Carlton** (12–3)	Rick Rhoden (8–3)	None	12,799	13–17 (47–38)
86	September 12	@ Pirates	2–6	Eddie Solomon (7–4)	**Dickie Noles** (0–2)	Rod Scurry (5)	11,370	13–18 (47–39)
87	September 13	@ Pirates	2–3	Odell Jones (4–2)	**Ron Reed** (4–2)	Kent Tekulve ()	16,493	13–19 (47–40)
–	September 15	@ Mets	Postponed (rain); Makeup: September 16 as a traditional double-header					
88	September 16 (1)	@ Mets	3–1	**Dick Ruthven** (11–5)	Pat Zachry (7–12)	None	see 2nd game	14–19 (48–40)
89	September 16 (2)	@ Mets	4–5	Mike Marshall (3–2)	**Steve Carlton** (12–4)	Neil Allen (17)	4,353	14–20 (48–41)
90	September 17	@ Mets	3–2	**Dickie Noles** (1–2)	Mike Scott (4–9)	**Ron Reed** (7)	5,501	15–20 (49–41)
91	September 18	Pirates	6–7	Rod Scurry (4–5)	**Ron Reed** (4–3)	Mark Lee (2)	24,537	15–21 (49–42)
92	September 19	Pirates	8–2	**Dan Larson** (2–0)	Odell Jones (4–3)	**Larry Christenson** (1)	30,446	16–21 (50–42)
93	September 20	Pirates	5–4	**Sparky Lyle** (8–5)	Eddie Solomon (7–5)	None	31,489	17–21 (51–42)
94	September 21	@ Expos	0–1 (17)	Bryn Smith (1–0)	**Jerry Reed** (0–1)	None	24,161	17–22 (51–43)
95	September 22	@ Expos	2–6	Steve Rogers (11–7)	**Dick Ruthven** (11–6)	None	21,797	17–23 (51–44)
96	September 23	@ Cardinals	9–4	**Dickie Noles** (2–2)	John Martin (6–5)	**Sparky Lyle** (2)	16,845	18–23 (52–44)
97	September 24	@ Cardinals	14–6	**Mark Davis** (1–3)	Lary Sorensen (7–7)	None	11,758	19–23 (53–44)
98	September 25	@ Cubs	9–2	**Dan Larson** (3–0)	Ken Kravec (1–6)	None	4,482	20–23 (54–44)
–	September 26	@ Cubs	Postponed (rain); Makeup: September 27 as a traditional double-header					
99	September 27 (1)	@ Cubs	5–2	**Steve Carlton** (13–4)	Doug Bird (9–6)	None	see 2nd game	21–23 (55–44)
100	September 27 (2)	@ Cubs	0–14	Mike Krukow (9–9)	**Dick Ruthven** (11–7)	None	18,783	21–24 (55–45)
101	September 28	Mets	12–4	**Larry Christenson** (4–6)	Ed Lynch (4–5)	None	20,403	22–24 (56–45)
102	September 29	Mets	0–7	Pete Falcone (4–3)	**Mark Davis** (1–4)	None	20,110	22–25 (56–46)
103	September 30	Cardinals	8–5	**Sparky Lyle** (9–5)	Luis DeLeón (0–1)	**Ron Reed** (8)	21,382	23–25 (57–46)

October (2–2)

#	Date	Opponent	Score	Win	Loss	Save	Attendance	Record (Overall Record)
104	October 1	Cardinals	2–3 (10)	Doug Bair (4–2)	**Larry Christenson** (4–7)	None	20,482	23–26 (57–47)
105	October 2	Cubs	9–7	**Ron Reed** (5–3)	Dick Tidrow (3–10)	None	20,453	24–26 (58–47)
106	October 3	Cubs	4–8	Jay Howell (2–0)	**Sparky Lyle** (9–6)	Randy Martz (6)	35,169	24–27 (58–48)
107	October 4	Cubs	2–1	**Dick Ruthven** (12–7)	Lee Smith (3–6)	**Tug McGraw** (10)	21,912	25–27 (59–48)

=== Roster ===
1981 Philadelphia Phillies
**Roster**
**Pitchers**: 40 Warren Brusstar; 50 Marty Bystrom; 32 Steve Carlton; 38 Larry Christenson; 43 Mark Davis; 35 Nino Espinosa; 49 Dan Larson; 28 Sparky Lyle; 45 Tug McGraw; 48 Dickie Noles; 30 Mike Proly; 35 Jerry Reed; 42 Ron Reed; 44 Dick Ruthven	**Catchers**: 8 Bob Boone; 17 Don McCormack; 6 Keith Moreland; 11 Ozzie Virgil; **Infielders**: 16 Luis Aguayo; 15 Ramón Avilés; 10 Larry Bowa; 24 Len Matuszek; 14 Pete Rose; 37 Ryne Sandberg; 20 Mike Schmidt; 9 Manny Trillo; 25 Del Unser; 18 John Vukovich	**Outfielders**: 26 Dick Davis; 22 Bob Dernier; 23 Greg Gross; 31 Garry Maddox; 34 Gary Matthews; 21 Bake McBride; 27 Lonnie Smith; 29 George Vukovich	**Manager**: 46 Dallas Green; **Coaches**: 12 Rubén Amaro; 2 Billy DeMars; 3 Lee Elia; 5 Mike Ryan; 4 Herm Starrette; 7 Bobby Wine

== Player stats ==
= Indicates team leader

= Indicates league leader

=== Batting ===
==== Starters by position ====
Note: Pos = Position; G = Games played; AB = At bats; H = Hits; Avg. = Batting average; HR = Home runs; RBI = Runs batted in

Pos	Player	G	AB	H	Avg.	HR	RBI
C	Bob Boone	76	227	48	.211	4	24
1B	Pete Rose	107	431	140	.325	0	33
2B	Manny Trillo	94	349	100	.287	6	36
SS	Larry Bowa	103	360	102	.283	0	31
3B	Mike Schmidt	102	354	112	.316	31	91
LF	Gary Matthews	101	359	108	.301	9	67
CF	Garry Maddox	94	323	85	.263	5	40
RF	Bake McBride	58	221	60	.271	2	21

==== Other batters ====
Note: G = Games played; AB = At bats; H = Hits; Avg. = Batting average; HR = Home runs; RBI = Runs batted in

Player	G	AB	H	Avg.	HR	RBI
Keith Moreland	61	196	50	.255	6	37
Lonnie Smith	62	176	57	.324	2	11
Greg Gross	83	102	23	.225	0	7
Dick Davis	45	96	32	.333	2	19
Luis Aguayo	45	84	18	.214	1	7
Del Unser	62	59	9	.153	0	6
Ramón Avilés	38	28	6	.214	0	3
George Vukovich	20	26	10	.385	1	4
Len Matuszek	13	11	3	.273	0	1
Ozzie Virgil Jr.	6	6	0	.000	0	0
Ryne Sandberg	13	6	1	.167	0	0
Bob Dernier	10	4	3	.750	0	0
Don McCormack	3	4	1	.250	0	0
John Vukovich	11	1	0	.000	0	0

=== Pitching ===
==== Starting pitchers ====
Note: G = Games pitched; IP = Innings pitched; W = Wins; L = Losses; ERA = Earned run average; SO = Strikeouts

Player	G	IP	W	L	ERA	SO
Steve Carlton	24	190.0	13	4	2.42	179
Dick Ruthven	23	146.2	12	7	5.15	80
Larry Christenson	20	106.2	4	7	3.54	70
Nino Espinosa	14	73.2	2	5	6.11	22
Marty Bystrom	9	53.2	4	3	3.35	24
Mark Davis	9	43.0	1	4	7.74	29

==== Other pitchers ====
Note: G = Games pitched; IP = Innings pitched; W = Wins; L = Losses; ERA = Earned run average; SO = Strikeouts

Player	G	IP	W	L	ERA	SO
Dickie Noles	13	58.1	2	2	4.17	34
Dan Larson	5	28.0	3	0	4.18	15

==== Relief pitchers ====
Note: G = Games pitched; W = Wins; L = Losses; SV = Saves; ERA = Earned run average; SO = Strikeouts

Player	G	W	L	SV	ERA	SO
Tug McGraw	34	2	4	10	2.66	26
Sparky Lyle	48	9	6	2	4.44	29
Ron Reed	39	5	3	8	3.08	40
Mike Proly	35	2	1	2	3.86	19
Warren Brusstar	14	0	1	0	4.38	8
Jerry Reed	4	0	1	0	7.71	5

== 1981 National League Division Series ==
=== Montreal Expos vs. Philadelphia Phillies ===
Montreal wins series, 3–2.

Game	Score	Date
1	**Montreal 3**, Philadelphia 1	October 7
2	**Montreal 3**, Philadelphia 1	October 8
3	**Philadelphia 6**, Montreal 2	October 9
4	**Philadelphia 6**, Montreal 5 (10 innings)	October 10
5	**Montreal 3**, Philadelphia 0	October 11

=== 1981 Postseason Game Log ===
Legend
	Phillies win
	Phillies loss
	Postponement
**Bold**	Phillies team member

1981 Postseason Game Log
Overall Record: 2–3
National League Divisional Series (2–3)

#	Date	Opponent	Score	Win	Loss	Save	Attendance	Record
1	October 7	@ Expos	1–3	Steve Rogers (1–0)	**Steve Carlton** (0–1)	Jeff Reardon (1)	34,237	0–1
2	October 8	@ Expos	1–3	Bill Gullickson (1–0)	**Dick Ruthven** (0–1)	Jeff Reardon (2)	45,896	0–2
3	October 9	Expos	6–2	**Larry Christenson** (1–0)	Ray Burris (0–1)	None	36,835	1–2
4	October 10	Expos	6–5 (10)	**Tug McGraw** (1–0)	Jeff Reardon (0–1)	None	38,818	2–2
5	October 11	Expos	0–3	Steve Rogers (2–0)	**Steve Carlton** (0–2)	None	47,384	2–3

== Farm system ==
Level	Team	League	Manager
AAA	Oklahoma City 89ers	American Association	Jim Snyder
AA	Reading Phillies	Eastern League	Ron Clark
A	Peninsula Pilots	Carolina League	Bill Dancy
A	Spartanburg Traders	South Atlantic League	Tom Harmon
A-Short Season	Bend Phillies	Northwest League	P. J. Carey
Rookie	Helena Phillies	Pioneer League	Roly de Armas
