= 1981 San Francisco Giants season =

1981 San Francisco Giants
- League: National League
- Division: West
- Ballpark: Candlestick Park
- City: San Francisco, California
- Owners: Bob Lurie
- General managers: Spec Richardson, Tom Haller
- Managers: Frank Robinson
- Television: KTVU (Lindsey Nelson, Gary Park, Edgard Martinez)
- Radio: KNBR (Lindsey Nelson, Hank Greenwald, David Glass)

The 1981 San Francisco Giants season was the Giants' 99th season in Major League Baseball, their 24th season in San Francisco since their move from New York following the 1957 season, and their 22nd at Candlestick Park. Giants manager Frank Robinson became the first black manager in the history of the National League. Robinson was also the first black manager in the history of the American League.

== Offseason ==
- December 8, 1980: Chris Bourjos and Bob Knepper were traded by the Giants to the Houston Astros for Enos Cabell.
- December 9, 1980: DeWayne Buice was drafted from the Giants by the Oakland Athletics in the 1980 minor league draft.
- December 12, 1980: John Montefusco and Craig Landis (minors) were traded by the Giants to the Atlanta Braves for Doyle Alexander.
- December 12, 1980: Joe Strain and Philip Nastu were traded by the Giants to the Chicago Cubs for Jerry Martin, Jesús Figueroa, and a player to be named later. The Cubs completed the deal by sending Mike Turgeon (minors) to the Giants on August 11, 1981.
- February 9, 1981: Joe Morgan was signed as a free agent by the Giants.
- March 23, 1981: Billy Smith was purchased by the Giants from the Philadelphia Phillies.
- March 31, 1981: Gorman Heimueller was released by the Giants.

== Regular season ==
=== Season standings ===
NL West
Team	W	L	Pct.	GB	Home	Road
Cincinnati Reds	66	42	.611	—	32‍–‍22	34‍–‍20
Los Angeles Dodgers	63	47	.573	4	33‍–‍23	30‍–‍24
Houston Astros	61	49	.555	6	31‍–‍20	30‍–‍29
San Francisco Giants	56	55	.505	11½	29‍–‍24	27‍–‍31
Atlanta Braves	50	56	.472	15	22‍–‍27	28‍–‍29
San Diego Padres	41	69	.373	26	20‍–‍35	21‍–‍34

NL West First Half Standings	W	L	Pct.	GB
Los Angeles Dodgers	36	21	.632	—
Cincinnati Reds	35	21	.625	1/2
Houston Astros	28	29	.491	8
Atlanta Braves	25	29	.463	9 1/2
San Francisco Giants	27	32	.458	10
San Diego Padres	23	33	.411	12 1/2

NL West Second Half Standings	W	L	Pct.	GB
Houston Astros	33	20	.623	—
Cincinnati Reds	31	21	.596	1 1/2
San Francisco Giants	29	23	.558	3 1/2
Los Angeles Dodgers	27	26	.509	6
Atlanta Braves	25	27	.481	7 1/2
San Diego Padres	18	36	.333	15 1/2

=== Record vs. opponents ===
1981 National League record Sources:
Team	ATL	CHC	CIN	HOU	LAD	MON	NYM	PHI	PIT	SD	SF	STL
Atlanta	—	3–2–1	6–5	4–8	7–7	3–7	3–3	4–5	2–3	9–6	5–7	4–3
Chicago	2–3–1	—	1–5	1–6	6–4	4–7	5–8–1	2–10	4–10	3–3	5–5	5–4–1
Cincinnati	5–6	5–1	—	8–4	8–8	5–4	7–3	5–2	4–2	10–2	9–5	0–5
Houston	8–4	6–1	4–8	—	4–8	5–2	6–3	4–6	2–4	11–3	9–6	2–4
Los Angeles	7–7	4–6	8–8	8–4	—	5–2	5–1	3–3	5–1	6–5	7–5	5–5
Montreal	7–3	7–4	4–5	2–5	2–5	—	9–3	7–4	10–3	4–2	2–5	6–9
New York	3–3	8–5–1	3–7	3–6	1–5	3–9	—	7–7	3–6–1	2–5	2–4	6–5
Philadelphia	5-4	10–2	2–5	6–4	3–3	4–7	7–7	—	7–5	4–2	4–3	7–6
Pittsburgh	3–2	10–4	2–4	4–2	1–5	3–10	6–3–1	5–7	—	6–4	3–7	3–8
San Diego	6–9	3–3	2–10	3–11	5–6	2–4	5–2	2–4	4–6	—	6–7	3–7
San Francisco	7–5	5–5	5–9	6–9	5–7	5–2	4–2	3–4	7–3	7–6	—	2–3
St. Louis	3–4	4–5–1	5–0	4–2	5–5	9–6	5–6	6–7	8–3	7–3	3–2	—

=== Opening Day starters ===
- Vida Blue
- Enos Cabell
- Jack Clark
- Darrell Evans
- Larry Herndon
- Johnnie LeMaster
- Milt May
- Joe Morgan
- Billy North

=== Notable transactions ===
- April 20, 1981: Mike Ivie was traded by the Giants to the Houston Astros for Dave Bergman and Jeffrey Leonard.
- May 17, 1981: Phil Ouellette was signed by the Giants as an amateur free agent.
- August 3, 1981: Mike Sadek was released by the Giants.

=== Roster ===
1981 San Francisco Giants
Roster
Pitchers: 33 Doyle Alexander; 14 Vida Blue; 48 Fred Breining; 43 Tom Griffin; 40 Alan Hargesheimer; 19 Al Holland; 46 Gary Lavelle; 38 Greg Minton; 17 Randy Moffitt; 45 Allen Ripley; 28 Mike Rowland; 17 Bob Tufts; 32 Ed Whitson	Catchers: 15 Bob Brenly; 7 Milt May; 3 Jeff Ransom; 3 Mike Sadek; Infielders: 16 Dave Bergman; 23 Enos Cabell; 41 Darrell Evans; 15 Mike Ivie; 10 Johnnie LeMaster; 8 Joe Morgan; 2 Joe Pettini; 21 Billy Smith; 6 Rennie Stennett; 18 Guy Sularz	Outfielders: 22 Jack Clark; 30 Chili Davis; 31 Larry Herndon; 26 Jeffrey Leonard; 25 Jerry Martin; 36 Billy North; 49 Max Venable; 1 Jim Wohlford	Manager: 20 Frank Robinson; Coaches: 8 Vern Benson; 9 Don Buford (First Base); 12 Jim Davenport (Third Base); 5 Jim Lefebvre (Hitting); 47 Don McMahon (Pitching); 42 John VanOrnum (Bullpen)

== Player stats ==
= Indicates team leader

=== Batting ===
==== Starters by position ====
Note: Pos = position; G = Games played; AB = At bats; H = Hits; Avg. = Batting average; HR = Home runs; RBI = Runs batted in

Pos	Player	G	AB	H	Avg.	HR	RBI
C	Milt May	97	316	98	.310	2	33
1B	Enos Cabell	96	396	101	.255	2	36
2B	Joe Morgan	90	308	74	.240	8	31
3B	Darrell Evans	102	357	92	.258	12	48
SS	Johnnie LeMaster	104	324	82	.253	0	28
LF	Jack Clark	99	385	103	.268	17	53
CF	Larry Herndon	96	364	105	.288	5	41
RF	Jerry Martin	72	241	58	.241	4	25

==== Other batters ====
Note: G = Games played; AB = At bats; H = Hits; Avg. = Batting average; HR = Home runs; RBI = Runs batted in

Player	G	AB	H	Avg.	HR	RBI
Dave Bergman	63	145	37	.255	3	13
Billy North	46	131	29	.221	1	12
Jeffrey Leonard	37	127	39	.307	4	26
Rennie Stennett	38	87	20	.230	1	7
Jim Wohlford	50	68	11	.162	1	7
Billy Smith	36	61	11	.180	1	5
Bob Brenly	19	45	15	.333	1	4
Mike Sadek	19	36	6	.167	0	3
Max Venable	18	32	6	.188	0	1
Joe Pettini	35	29	2	.069	0	2
Guy Sularz	10	20	4	.200	0	2
Mike Ivie	7	17	5	.294	0	3
Chili Davis	8	15	2	.133	0	0
Jeff Ransom	5	15	4	.267	0	0

=== Pitching ===
==== Starting pitchers ====
Note: G = Games pitched; IP = Innings pitched; W = Wins; L = Losses; ERA = Earned run average; SO = Strikeouts

Player	G	IP	W	L	ERA	SO
Doyle Alexander	24	152.1	11	7	2.89	77
Tom Griffin	22	129.1	8	8	3.76	83
Ed Whitson	22	123.0	6	9	4.02	65
Vida Blue	18	124.2	8	6	2.45	63
Allen Ripley	19	90.2	4	4	4.07	47

==== Other pitchers ====
Note: G = Games pitched; IP = Innings pitched; W = Wins; L = Losses; ERA = Earned run average; SO = Strikeouts

Player	G	IP	W	L	ERA	SO
Alan Hargesheimer	6	18.2	1	2	4.34	6

==== Relief pitchers ====
Note: G = Games pitched; IP = Innings pitched; W = Wins; L = Losses; SV = Saves; ERA = Earned run average; SO = Strikeouts

Player	G	IP	W	L	SV	ERA	SO
Greg Minton	55	84.1	4	5	21	2.88	29
Al Holland	47	100.2	7	5	7	2.41	78
Fred Breining	45	77.2	5	2	1	2.55	37
Gary Lavelle	34	65.2	2	6	4	3.84	45
Mike Rowland	9	15.2	0	1	0	3.45	8
Bob Tufts	11	15.1	0	0	0	3.52	12
Randy Moffitt	10	11.1	0	0	0	7.94	11

== Awards and honors ==
- 1981 Larry Herndon LF, Willie Mac Award

All-Star Game

- Vida Blue, reserve

== Farm system ==
Level	Team	League	Manager
AAA	Phoenix Giants	Pacific Coast League	Rocky Bridges
AA	Shreveport Captains	Texas League	Jack Mull
A	Fresno Giants	California League	Wayne Cato
A	Clinton Giants	Midwest League	Wendell Kim
Rookie	Great Falls Giants	Pioneer League	Ernie Rodriguez
