= Bill Caudill =

American baseball player (born 1956)

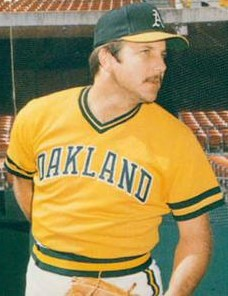
- Pitcher
- Born: July 13, 1956 (age 69); Santa Monica, California, U.S.
- Batted: Right Threw: Right

MLB debut
- May 12, 1979, for the Chicago Cubs

Last MLB appearance
- July 28, 1987, for the Oakland Athletics

MLB statistics
- Win–loss record: 35–52
- Earned run average: 3.68
- Strikeouts: 620
- Saves: 106
- Stats at Baseball Reference

Teams
- Chicago Cubs (1979–1981); Seattle Mariners (1982–1983); Oakland Athletics (1984); Toronto Blue Jays (1985–1986); Oakland Athletics (1987)

Career highlights and awards
- All-Star (1984)

William Holland Caudill (born July 13, 1956) is an American former professional baseball pitcher. Caudill was one of the top closers in Major League Baseball (MLB) from 1982 to 1985.

== Early years ==
Caudill attended Aviation High School in Redondo Beach, California, and graduated in 1974. He was selected in the eighth round of the 1974 Major League Baseball draft by the St. Louis Cardinals.

After three seasons in the Cardinals' farm system, in which he went 21–23 with a 3.57 earned run average, he was traded to the Cincinnati Reds for Joel Youngblood just before the start of the 1977 season. He went 15–6 with a 4.04 ERA his only season in the Reds' farm system, after which he and Woodie Fryman were traded to the Chicago Cubs for Bill Bonham.

== Chicago Cubs ==
Caudill spent the 1978 season with the Wichita Aeros of the American Association. He split the 1979 season between Wichita and the Cubs, making his major league debut on May 12. Though he had been used almost exclusively as a starter in the minors, he made his major league debut in relief. Already down 10–3 to the Houston Astros, Caudill was called upon for mop up duty. He pitched the rest of the game, giving up only one unearned run. Splitting his time between the bullpen and the starting rotation, Caudill went 1–7 with a 4.80 ERA and 104 strikeouts his rookie season. He recorded his first MLB win on September 29, his last appearance that season.

In 1980, Caudill went 4–6 with a 2.19 ERA and 112 strikeouts. He earned his first major league save on September 28 against the Pittsburgh Pirates and was second only to Dick Tidrow with 72 games pitched for the Cubs. His numbers dipped to 1–5 with a 5.83 ERA in 1981.

== Seattle Mariners ==
On April 1, 1982, Caudill was one of two players to be named later from a 1981 mid-season deal in which the Cubs received Pat Tabler from the New York Yankees. The Cubs later sent Jay Howell to the Yankees to complete that trade. The Yankees immediately sent Caudill, Gene Nelson, and a player to be named later to the Seattle Mariners for Shane Rawley. The Mariners later also received Bobby Brown from the Yankees.

The Mariners introduced a nautically themed bullpen car called the "Tugboat" for the 1982 season. It got off to a rocky start for the home opener when Caudill stole the keys during pregame festivities, leaving the Tugboat stranded on the left-field line and delaying the start of the game. On another occasion, when brought in to pitch in a one-sided game, Caudill appeared from the bullpen sporting a half-shaved beard. He acquired the nickname "the Inspector" after inspecting the Mariners bats for unused hits and discarding those he deemed empty. The team began playing the Pink Panther Theme over the Kingdome loudspeakers when he was summoned from the Mariners' bullpen.

Despite his antics, Caudill emerged as one of the American League's top relievers his first season in Seattle. He felt snubbed when All-Star manager Billy Martin of Oakland left him off the AL squad, which had eight pitchers. His record stood at 8–3 with a 1.95 ERA and a team record 17 saves when selections were made. For the season, he went 12–9 with a 2.35 ERA, 26 saves, and 111 strikeouts.

Caudill's 26 saves in 1983 mirrored his previous season's production, however, his record dipped to 2–8 while his ERA ballooned to 4.71.

== Oakland Athletics ==
On November 21, 1983, Caudill and Darrel Akerfelds were dealt to the Oakland Athletics for Dave Beard and Bob Kearney.

Caudill returned to form with the A's in the first half of 1984. His record stood at 8–1 with a 1.97 ERA and 18 saves when AL manager Joe Altobelli of Baltimore named him to his AL All-Star squad. With the NL leading 2–1, Caudill was brought in to pitch the seventh inning, and he struck out all three batters he faced, Tim Raines, Ryne Sandberg, and Keith Hernandez.

That proved to be the high point of Caudill's season. He went 1–6 in the second half with a 3.60 ERA and blew four saves. He finished 1984 with a career-high 36 saves, which was second in the American League only to the 44 of Kansas City Royals' Dan Quisenberry.

== Toronto Blue Jays ==
Oakland traded Caudill to the Toronto Blue Jays on December 8, 1984 for Dave Collins and Alfredo Griffin. Caudill was manager Bobby Cox's top closer upon his arrival in Toronto, but lost his job to Tom Henke by the end of the 1985 season. The change worked as the Jays won the American League East by two games over the Yankees.

The Jays jumped to a 3–1 series lead in the American League Championship Series against the Kansas City Royals, however, 1985 was the first post-season that the championship series was expanded to seven games. The Royals came back to win the series in seven games (and the World Series); Caudill did not make an appearance.

A shoulder injury limited Caudill to 40 appearances in 1986. He went 2–4 with a 6.19 ERA and just two saves as the Blue Jays fell to 86–76 and fourth place in their division under new manager Jimy Williams. He was released during spring training the following season, and shortly afterwards, he signed with the A's.

== Oakland Athletics (second stint) ==
Trying to rebound from a subpar season with Toronto in 1986, Caudill began the 1987 season with Oakland's Triple-A affiliate, the Tacoma Tigers of the Pacific Coast League. He pitched effectively enough to earn a call to the majors. However, after just a month with the A's, he suffered a broken hand after punching a man who was reportedly trying to accost his wife in a hotel parking lot in 1987. It effectively ended his big league career at age 30.

After retiring from baseball, Caudill coached baseball at Eastside Catholic High School near Seattle and worked for his former agent, Scott Boras, a former minor league teammate and close friend.
