= Dickie Noles =

American baseball player (born 1956)

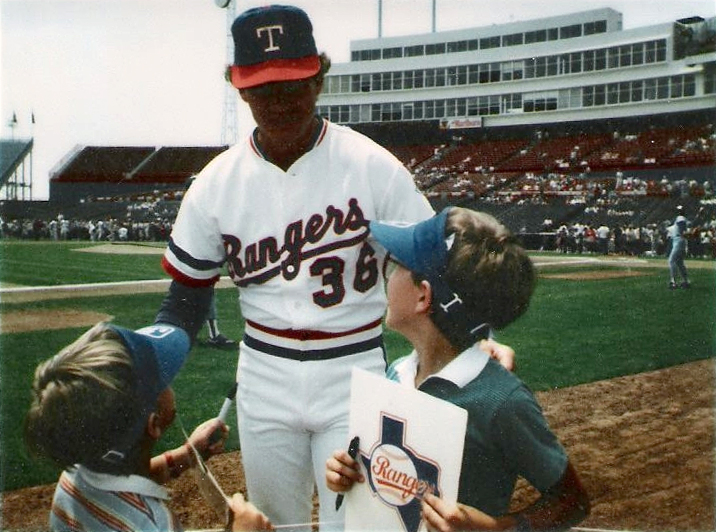
- Pitcher
- Born: November 19, 1956 (age 69); Charlotte, North Carolina, U.S.
- Batted: Right Threw: Right

MLB debut
- July 5, 1979, for the Philadelphia Phillies

Last MLB appearance
- May 8, 1990, for the Philadelphia Phillies

Major League Baseball statistics
- Win–loss record: 36–53
- Earned run average: 4.56
- Strikeouts: 455
- Stats at Baseball Reference

Teams
- Philadelphia Phillies (1979–1981); Chicago Cubs (1982–1984); Texas Rangers (1984–1985); Cleveland Indians (1986); Chicago Cubs (1987); Detroit Tigers (1987); Baltimore Orioles (1988); Philadelphia Phillies (1990)

Career highlights and awards
- World Series champion (1980)

Dickie Ray Noles (born November 19, 1956) is an American former Major League Baseball (MLB) pitcher with the Philadelphia Phillies, Chicago Cubs, Texas Rangers, Cleveland Indians, Detroit Tigers, and the Baltimore Orioles between 1979 and 1990. He batted and threw right-handed. Today, Noles is a born-again Christian and works for the Philadelphia Phillies.

== Career ==
Noles attended Harry P. Harding High School in Charlotte, North Carolina. He was selected in the 4th round (84th overall) in the 1975 June amateur baseball draft by the Philadelphia Phillies.

Noles was an effective relief pitcher for the Phillies' 1980 World Series championship team. In Game 4 of that series, Noles came on in relief of Larry Christenson in the first inning with only one out and the Phillies down 4–0 to the Kansas City Royals. Noles pitched the next 4 2/3 innings and gave up another run, but is most remembered for throwing a fastball under George Brett's chin in the fourth inning that prompted a warning by the umpires to both teams. Brett struck out in the at-bat and had only three singles and one RBI the remainder of the series. The brushback incident is looked upon as the turning point in that series for the Phillies.

Noles was traded along with Keith Moreland and Dan Larson from the Phillies to the Cubs for Mike Krukow on December 8, 1981. He had an effective season as a starter in 1982, going 10–13. In early 1983, however, Noles' alcohol problems began to surface. He and a Cubs teammate drunkenly assaulted a police officer after a game and Noles severely injured his left knee. Noles spent 16 days in jail, was forced to enter alcohol rehabilitation, and was forced to pay a substantial amount of his baseball earnings in an ensuing civil suit. Noles reports that he has been sober since April 9, 1983, the date of the incident.

Noles is one of four players in MLB history to be "traded for himself" (Harry Chiti, Brad Gulden, and John McDonald are the other three). He was dealt from the Cubs to the Tigers for a player to be named later on September 21, 1987. He was returned to the Cubs 32 days later on October 23 when the teams were unable to agree on what player Chicago would receive. Two and a half weeks after that, the Cubs granted Noles free agency. He signed with Baltimore for the 1988 season, but only appeared in two games for them. Noles finished his career with a single game for the 1990 Philadelphia Phillies.

== Personal life ==
Noles was formerly married to Susan Noles. They have three children and six grandchildren. Susan is most well known for her appearance on The Golden Bachelor (2023).
