= Dan Larson =

American baseball player (born 1954)

- Pitcher
- Born: July 4, 1954 (age 72); Los Angeles, California, U.S.
- Batted: Right Threw: Right

MLB debut
- July 18, 1976, for the Houston Astros

Last MLB appearance
- June 1, 1982, for the Chicago Cubs

MLB statistics
- Win–loss record: 10–25
- Earned run average: 4.40
- Strikeouts: 151
- Stats at Baseball Reference

Teams
- Houston Astros (1976–1977); Philadelphia Phillies (1978–1981); Chicago Cubs (1982)

Daniel James Larson (born July 4, 1954) is an American former Major League Baseball pitcher. Larson pitched in all or parts of seven seasons from 1976 and 1982.

Larson was drafted in the first round of the 1972 Major League Baseball draft by the St. Louis Cardinals, while at Alhambra High School (Alhambra, California) but never played in the majors for them. Instead, he was sent to the Houston Astros as part of a trade that brought pitcher Claude Osteen to the Cardinals. Larson made his major league debut with the Astros in 1976, and that was probably his best season. He went 5–8 in 1976, with a career-best 3.02 ERA.

In 1977, Larson spent most of the season in the majors, but his performance went down significantly, as he won just one game in eight decisions and his ERA nearly doubled to 5.81. Larson spent nearly the entire 1978 season back in the minor leagues, and that September he was traded to the Philadelphia Phillies for pitcher Dan Warthen. He made one appearance for the Phillies, pitching one inning.

Larson spent most of the next three seasons in the minor leagues, making brief appearances in the majors in each year. Over those seasons, Larson pitched in a total of 20 games, mostly as a starter. In 1980, Larson had a respectable 3.15 ERA, but gave up many unearned runs, resulting in a record of 0–5.

Larson was traded along with Keith Moreland and Dickie Noles from the Phillies to the Cubs for Mike Krukow on December 8, 1981. Larson again went winless in 1982, going 0–4 with a 5.67 ERA, and never appeared in the major leagues again. He continued to play minor league baseball until 1984 before retiring.
