= 1981 New York Mets season =

1981 New York Mets
- League: National League
- Division: East
- Ballpark: Shea Stadium
- City: New York
- Record: 41–62 (.398)
- Divisional place: 5th
- Owners: Nelson Doubleday, Jr.
- General manager: Frank Cashen
- Manager: Joe Torre
- Television: WOR-TV
- Radio: WMCA (Ralph Kiner, Bob Murphy, Steve Albert, Art Shamsky)

The 1981 New York Mets season was the 20th regular season for the Mets. They went 41–62 and finished in fifth place in the National League East. They were managed by Joe Torre. They played home games at Shea Stadium. The season is remembered for a summer strike that cut the season in half.

== Offseason ==
- November 16, 1980: Kevin Mitchell was signed as an amateur free agent by the Mets.
- December 15, 1980: José Moreno and John Pacella were traded by the Mets to the San Diego Padres for Randy Jones.
- December 15, 1980: Rick Sweet was purchased by the Mets from the San Diego Padres.
- December 16, 1980: Rusty Staub was signed as a free agent by the Mets.
- December 19, 1980: Mike Cubbage was signed as a free agent with the New York Mets.
- January 13, 1981: Randy Milligan was drafted by the Mets in the 1st round (3rd pick) of the 1981 Major League Baseball draft.

== Regular season ==
=== Season standings ===
NL East
Team	W	L	Pct.	GB	Home	Road
St. Louis Cardinals	59	43	.578	—	32‍–‍21	27‍–‍22
Montreal Expos	60	48	.556	2	38‍–‍18	22‍–‍30
Philadelphia Phillies	59	48	.551	2½	36‍–‍19	23‍–‍29
Pittsburgh Pirates	46	56	.451	13	22‍–‍28	24‍–‍28
New York Mets	41	62	.398	18½	24‍–‍27	17‍–‍35
Chicago Cubs	38	65	.369	21½	27‍–‍30	11‍–‍35

NL East First Half Standings	W	L	Pct.	GB
Philadelphia Phillies	34	21	.618	—
St. Louis Cardinals	30	20	.600	1 1/2
Montreal Expos	30	25	.545	4
Pittsburgh Pirates	25	23	.521	5 1/2
New York Mets	17	34	.333	15
Chicago Cubs	15	37	.288	17 1/2

NL East Second Half Standings	W	L	Pct.	GB
Montreal Expos	30	23	.566	—
St. Louis Cardinals	29	23	.558	1/2
Philadelphia Phillies	25	27	.481	4 1/2
New York Mets	24	28	.462	5 1/2
Chicago Cubs	23	28	.451	6
Pittsburgh Pirates	21	33	.389	9 1/2

=== Record vs. opponents ===
1981 National League record Sources:
Team	ATL	CHC	CIN	HOU	LAD	MON	NYM	PHI	PIT	SD	SF	STL
Atlanta	—	3–2–1	6–5	4–8	7–7	3–7	3–3	4–5	2–3	9–6	5–7	4–3
Chicago	2–3–1	—	1–5	1–6	6–4	4–7	5–8–1	2–10	4–10	3–3	5–5	5–4–1
Cincinnati	5–6	5–1	—	8–4	8–8	5–4	7–3	5–2	4–2	10–2	9–5	0–5
Houston	8–4	6–1	4–8	—	4–8	5–2	6–3	4–6	2–4	11–3	9–6	2–4
Los Angeles	7–7	4–6	8–8	8–4	—	5–2	5–1	3–3	5–1	6–5	7–5	5–5
Montreal	7–3	7–4	4–5	2–5	2–5	—	9–3	7–4	10–3	4–2	2–5	6–9
New York	3–3	8–5–1	3–7	3–6	1–5	3–9	—	7–7	3–6–1	2–5	2–4	6–5
Philadelphia	5-4	10–2	2–5	6–4	3–3	4–7	7–7	—	7–5	4–2	4–3	7–6
Pittsburgh	3–2	10–4	2–4	4–2	1–5	3–10	6–3–1	5–7	—	6–4	3–7	3–8
San Diego	6–9	3–3	2–10	3–11	5–6	2–4	5–2	2–4	4–6	—	6–7	3–7
San Francisco	7–5	5–5	5–9	6–9	5–7	5–2	4–2	3–4	7–3	7–6	—	2–3
St. Louis	3–4	4–5–1	5–0	4–2	5–5	9–6	5–6	6–7	8–3	7–3	3–2	—

=== Notable transactions ===
- April 3, 1981: John Csefalvay (minors) was traded by the Mets to the Houston Astros for Gary Rajsich.
- April 5, 1981: Dan Boitano was purchased by the New York Mets from the Milwaukee Brewers.
- April 6, 1981: Butch Benton was sent to the Chicago Cubs by the New York Mets as part of a conditional deal.
- May 29, 1981: Jeff Reardon and Dan Norman were traded by the Mets to the Montreal Expos for Ellis Valentine.
- June 8, 1981: 1981 Major League Baseball draft
  - John Christensen was drafted by the Mets in the 2nd round.
  - Roger Clemens was drafted by the Mets in the 12th round, but did not sign.
  - Lenny Dykstra was drafted by the Mets in the 13th round. Player signed July 3, 1981.
  - Lou Thornton was drafted by the Mets in the 19th round.
- June 15, 1981: Bill Latham was signed as an amateur free agent by the Mets.
- August 19, 1981: Mike Marshall was signed as a free agent by the Mets.

=== Roster ===
1981 New York Mets
Roster
Pitchers: 13 Neil Allen; 36 Dan Boitano; 33 Pete Falcone; 20 Greg Harris; 32 Tom Hausman; 25 Randy Jones; 43 Terry Leach; 38 Tim Leary; 59 Ed Lynch; 28 Mike Marshall; 49 Dyar Miller; 47 Jesse Orosco; 25 Charlie Puleo; 44 Jeff Reardon; 34 Dave Roberts; 30 Mike Scott; 44 Ray Searage; 27 Craig Swan; 40 Pat Zachry	Catchers: 42 Ron Hodges; 12 John Stearns; 6 Alex Treviño; Infielders: 6 Wally Backman; 4 Bob Bailor; 7 Hubie Brooks; 3 Mike Cubbage; 23 Doug Flynn; 19 Ron Gardenhire; 15,17 Brian Giles; 22 Mike Jorgensen; 26 Dave Kingman; 10 Rusty Staub; 11 Frank Taveras	Outfielders: 15 Mike Howard; 16 Lee Mazzilli; 17 Ellis Valentine; 1 Mookie Wilson; 18 Joel Youngblood	Manager: 9 Joe Torre; Coaches: 53 Chuck Cottier; 45 Bob Gibson; 51 Deron Johnson; 52 Joe Pignatano; 54 Rube Walker

== Player stats ==
= Indicates team leader

=== Batting ===
==== Starters by position ====
Note: Pos = Position; G = Games played; AB = At bats; H = Hits; Avg. = Batting average; HR = Home runs; RBI = Runs batted in

Pos	Player	G	AB	H	Avg.	HR	RBI
C	John Stearns	80	273	74	.271	1	24
1B	Dave Kingman	100	353	78	.221	22	59
2B	Doug Flynn	105	325	72	.222	1	20
SS	Frank Taveras	84	283	65	.230	0	11
3B	Hubie Brooks	98	358	110	.307	4	38
LF	Lee Mazzilli	95	324	74	.228	6	34
CF	Mookie Wilson	92	328	89	.271	3	14
RF	Ellis Valentine	48	169	35	.207	5	21

==== Other batters ====
Note: G = Games played; AB = At bats; H = Hits; Avg. = Batting average; HR = Home runs; RBI = Runs batted in

Player	G	AB	H	Avg.	HR	RBI
Rusty Staub	70	161	51	.317	5	21
Alex Treviño	56	149	39	.262	0	10
Joel Youngblood	43	143	50	.350	4	25
Mike Jorgensen	86	122	25	.205	3	15
Bob Bailor	51	81	23	.284	0	8
Mike Cubbage	67	80	17	.213	1	4
Ron Gardenhire	27	48	13	.271	0	3
Ron Hodges	35	43	13	.302	1	6
Wally Backman	26	36	10	.278	0	0
Mike Howard	14	24	4	.167	0	3
Brian Giles	9	7	0	.000	0	0

=== Pitching ===
= Indicates league leader

==== Starting pitchers ====
Note: G = Games pitched; IP = Innings pitched; W = Wins; L = Losses; ERA = Earned run average; SO = Strikeouts

Player	G	IP	W	L	ERA	SO
Pat Zachry	24	139.0	7	14*	4.14	76
Mike Scott	23	136.0	5	10	3.90	54
Ed Lynch	17	80.1	4	5	2.91	27
Greg A. Harris	16	68.2	3	5	4.46	54
Randy Jones	13	59.1	1	8	4.85	14
Tim Leary	1	2.0	0	0	0.00	3

- Tied with Steve Mura (San Diego)

==== Other pitchers ====
Note: G = Games pitched; IP = Innings pitched; W = Wins; L = Losses; ERA = Earned run average; SO = Strikeouts

Player	G	IP	W	L	ERA	SO
Pete Falcone	35	95.1	5	3	2.55	56
Dave Roberts	7	15.1	0	3	9.39	10
Craig Swan	5	13.2	0	2	3.29	9
Charlie Puleo	4	13.1	0	0	0.00	8

==== Relief pitchers ====
Note: G = Games pitched; W = Wins; L = Losses; SV = Saves; ERA = Earned run average; SO = Strikeouts

Player	G	W	L	SV	ERA	SO
Neil Allen	43	7	6	18	2.97	50
Ray Searage	26	1	0	1	3.68	16
Dyar Miller	23	1	0	0	3.29	22
Terry Leach	21	1	1	0	2.55	16
Tom Hausman	20	0	1	0	2.18	13
Mike Marshall	20	3	2	0	2.61	8
Jeff Reardon	18	1	0	2	3.45	28
Dan Boitano	15	2	1	0	5.51	8
Jesse Orosco	8	0	1	1	1.56	18

== Farm system ==
Level	Team	League	Manager
AAA	Tidewater Tides	International League	Jack Aker
AA	Jackson Mets	Texas League	Davey Johnson
A	Lynchburg Mets	Carolina League	Gene Dusan
A	Shelby Mets	South Atlantic League	Dan Monzon
A-Short Season	Little Falls Mets	New York–Penn League	Rich Miller
Rookie	Kingsport Mets	Appalachian League	Al Jackson

LEAGUE CHAMPIONS: Jackson
