= 1981 Pittsburgh Pirates season =

1981 Pittsburgh Pirates
- League: National League
- Division: East
- Ballpark: Three Rivers Stadium
- City: Pittsburgh, Pennsylvania
- Record: First half: 25–23 (.521); Second half: 21–33 (.389)
- Divisional place: First half: 4th Second half: 6th
- Owners: John W. Galbreath (majority shareholder); Thomas P. Johnson (minority shareholder)
- General managers: Harding "Pete" Peterson
- Managers: Chuck Tanner
- Television: KDKA-TV; Lanny Frattare, Jim Rooker, John Sanders; Action-TV; Bob Prince, Ray Scott
- Radio: KDKA; Lanny Frattare, Jim Rooker

The 1981 Pittsburgh Pirates season was the 100th season of the Pittsburgh Pirates franchise; their 95th in the National League. The Pirates finished fourth in the National League East in the first half of the season with a record of 25–23 and sixth in the second half with a record of 21–33.

== Regular season ==
Officials of the Louisiana Superdome met with Pirates management in April 1981 about moving the club to New Orleans when the Pirates were unhappy with their lease at Three Rivers Stadium.

=== Season standings ===
NL East
| Team | W | L | Pct. | GB | Home | Road |
|---|---|---|---|---|---|---|
| St. Louis Cardinals | 59 | 43 | .578 | — | 32‍–‍21 | 27‍–‍22 |
| Montreal Expos | 60 | 48 | .556 | 2 | 38‍–‍18 | 22‍–‍30 |
| Philadelphia Phillies | 59 | 48 | .551 | 2½ | 36‍–‍19 | 23‍–‍29 |
| Pittsburgh Pirates | 46 | 56 | .451 | 13 | 22‍–‍28 | 24‍–‍28 |
| New York Mets | 41 | 62 | .398 | 18½ | 24‍–‍27 | 17‍–‍35 |
| Chicago Cubs | 38 | 65 | .369 | 21½ | 27‍–‍30 | 11‍–‍35 |

| NL East First Half Standings | W | L | Pct. | GB |
|---|---|---|---|---|
| Philadelphia Phillies | 34 | 21 | .618 | — |
| St. Louis Cardinals | 30 | 20 | .600 | 1 1/2 |
| Montreal Expos | 30 | 25 | .545 | 4 |
| Pittsburgh Pirates | 25 | 23 | .521 | 5 1/2 |
| New York Mets | 17 | 34 | .333 | 15 |
| Chicago Cubs | 15 | 37 | .288 | 17 1/2 |

| NL East Second Half Standings | W | L | Pct. | GB |
|---|---|---|---|---|
| Montreal Expos | 30 | 23 | .566 | — |
| St. Louis Cardinals | 29 | 23 | .558 | 1/2 |
| Philadelphia Phillies | 25 | 27 | .481 | 4 1/2 |
| New York Mets | 24 | 28 | .462 | 5 1/2 |
| Chicago Cubs | 23 | 28 | .451 | 6 |
| Pittsburgh Pirates | 21 | 33 | .389 | 9 1/2 |

=== Record vs. opponents ===
1981 National League record Sources:
| Team | ATL | CHC | CIN | HOU | LAD | MON | NYM | PHI | PIT | SD | SF | STL |
|---|---|---|---|---|---|---|---|---|---|---|---|---|
| Atlanta | — | 3–2–1 | 6–5 | 4–8 | 7–7 | 3–7 | 3–3 | 4–5 | 2–3 | 9–6 | 5–7 | 4–3 |
| Chicago | 2–3–1 | — | 1–5 | 1–6 | 6–4 | 4–7 | 5–8–1 | 2–10 | 4–10 | 3–3 | 5–5 | 5–4–1 |
| Cincinnati | 5–6 | 5–1 | — | 8–4 | 8–8 | 5–4 | 7–3 | 5–2 | 4–2 | 10–2 | 9–5 | 0–5 |
| Houston | 8–4 | 6–1 | 4–8 | — | 4–8 | 5–2 | 6–3 | 4–6 | 2–4 | 11–3 | 9–6 | 2–4 |
| Los Angeles | 7–7 | 4–6 | 8–8 | 8–4 | — | 5–2 | 5–1 | 3–3 | 5–1 | 6–5 | 7–5 | 5–5 |
| Montreal | 7–3 | 7–4 | 4–5 | 2–5 | 2–5 | — | 9–3 | 7–4 | 10–3 | 4–2 | 2–5 | 6–9 |
| New York | 3–3 | 8–5–1 | 3–7 | 3–6 | 1–5 | 3–9 | — | 7–7 | 3–6–1 | 2–5 | 2–4 | 6–5 |
| Philadelphia | 5-4 | 10–2 | 2–5 | 6–4 | 3–3 | 4–7 | 7–7 | — | 7–5 | 4–2 | 4–3 | 7–6 |
| Pittsburgh | 3–2 | 10–4 | 2–4 | 4–2 | 1–5 | 3–10 | 6–3–1 | 5–7 | — | 6–4 | 3–7 | 3–8 |
| San Diego | 6–9 | 3–3 | 2–10 | 3–11 | 5–6 | 2–4 | 5–2 | 2–4 | 4–6 | — | 6–7 | 3–7 |
| San Francisco | 7–5 | 5–5 | 5–9 | 6–9 | 5–7 | 5–2 | 4–2 | 3–4 | 7–3 | 7–6 | — | 2–3 |
| St. Louis | 3–4 | 4–5–1 | 5–0 | 4–2 | 5–5 | 9–6 | 5–6 | 6–7 | 8–3 | 7–3 | 3–2 | — |

=== Game log ===
1981 Game Log: 46–56 (Home: 22–28; Away: 24–28)
April: 7–6 (Home: 1–3; Away: 6–3)

| # | Date | Opponent | Score | Win | Loss | Save | Attendance | Record |
|---|---|---|---|---|---|---|---|---|
| 1 | April 9 | Expos | 5–6 | Fryman | **Tekulve** (0–1) | — | 40,332 | 0–1 |
| 2 | April 12 | Expos | 3–2 | **Rhoden** (1–0) | Burris | **Romo** (1) | 8,430 | 1–1 |
| 3 | April 13 | @ Phillies | 1–5 | Carlton | **Candelaria** (0–1) | — | 60,404 | 1–2 |
| 4 | April 15 | @ Phillies | 3–4 (11) | McGraw | **Romo** (0–1) | — | 27,450 | 1–3 |
| 5 | April 16 | @ Phillies | 3–5 | Ruthven | **Robinson** (0–1) | McGraw | 26,780 | 1–4 |
| 6 | April 17 | @ Astros | 4–3 | **Rhoden** (2–0) | Sutton | **Romo** (2) | 39,119 | 2–4 |
| 7 | April 18 | @ Astros | 6–3 (11) | **Jackson** (1–0) | Smith | — | 29,790 | 3–4 |
| 8 | April 19 | @ Astros | 2–0 | **Scurry** (1–0) | Niekro | **Solomon** (1) | 30,394 | 4–4 |
| 9 | April 22 | Mets | 2–2 | | | — | 7,530 | 4–4 |
| 10 | April 25 | Cardinals | 1–5 | Shirley | **Candelaria** (0–2) | — | 7,334 | 4–5 |
| 11 | April 26 | Cardinals | 2–3 | Kaat | **Jackson** (1–1) | Sutter | 8,139 | 4–6 |
| 12 | April 28 | @ Mets | 8–0 | **Rhoden** (3–0) | Scott | — | 6,973 | 5–6 |
| 13 | April 29 | @ Mets | 10–0 | **Bibby** (1–0) | Roberts | — | 7,175 | 6–6 |
| 14 | April 30 | @ Mets | 7–4 | **Candelaria** (1–2) | Jones | **Jackson** (1) | 5,553 | 7–6 |

May: 13–14 (Home: 5–6; Away: 8–8)

| # | Date | Opponent | Score | Win | Loss | Save | Attendance | Record |
|---|---|---|---|---|---|---|---|---|
| 15 | May 1 | Astros | 3–5 | Sambito | **Solomon** (0–1) | — | 7,012 | 7–7 |
| 16 | May 2 | Astros | 5–4 (12) | **Solomon** (1–1) | Smith | — | 21,993 | 8–7 |
| 17 | May 3 | Astros | 1–3 | Sutton | **Bibby** (1–1) | Smith | 10,438 | 8–8 |
| 18 | May 6 | @ Reds | 8–9 | Hume | **Jackson** (1–2) | — | 14,551 | 8–9 |
| 19 | May 7 | @ Reds | 3–1 | **Rhoden** (4–0) | Soto | **Romo** (3) | | 9–9 |
| 20 | May 7 | @ Reds | 7–1 | **Solomon** (2–1) | LaCoss | — | 20,301 | 10–9 |
| 21 | May 8 | @ Cardinals | 4–5 | Shirley | **Bibby** (1–2) | Kaat | 20,108 | 10–10 |
| 22 | May 9 | @ Cardinals | 0–13 | Rincon | **Scurry** (1–1) | — | 21,361 | 10–11 |
| 23 | May 10 | @ Cardinals | 8–2 | **Candelaria** (2–2) | Sorensen | **Romo** (4) | 11,112 | 11–11 |
| 24 | May 11 | @ Braves | 2–3 (10) | Mahler | **Tekulve** (0–2) | — | 4,260 | 11–12 |
| 25 | May 12 | @ Braves | 0–2 | Niekro | **Solomon** (2–2) | — | 9,711 | 11–13 |
| 26 | May 13 | @ Braves | 7–5 (13) | **Cruz** (1–0) | Boggs | **Scurry** (1) | 10,638 | 12–13 |
| 27 | May 15 | Reds | 1–4 | Price | **Romo** (0–2) | Hume | 10,592 | 12–14 |
| 28 | May 16 | Reds | 0–4 | LaCoss | **Scurry** (1–2) | — | 11,890 | 12–15 |
| 29 | May 17 | Reds | 3–4 | Soto | **Solomon** (2–3) | — | 11,775 | 12–16 |
| 30 | May 19 | Braves | 5–0 | **Bibby** (2–2) | Niekro | — | 5,514 | 13–16 |
| 31 | May 20 | Braves | 6–1 | **Rhoden** (5–0) | Walk | **Romo** (5) | 8,351 | 14–16 |
| 32 | May 22 | Phillies | 3–1 | **Perez** (1–0) | Christenson | — | 20,695 | 15–16 |
| 33 | May 23 | Phillies | 4–6 | Proly | **Tekulve** (0–3) | Reed | 20,340 | 15–17 |
| 34 | May 24 | Phillies | 7–1 | **Bibby** (3–2) | Bystrom | **Cruz** (1) | 21,771 | 16–17 |
| 35 | May 25 | @ Cubs | 9–10 (11) | Tidrow | **Cruz** (1–1) | — | 18,506 | 16–18 |
| 36 | May 26 | @ Cubs | 6–4 | **Tekulve** (1–3) | Krukow | **Romo** (6) | 6,988 | 17–18 |
| 37 | May 27 | @ Cubs | 3–2 | **Perez** (2–0) | Reuschel | — | 6,970 | 18–18 |
| 38 | May 28 | @ Cubs | 9–4 | **Solomon** (3–3) | Caudill | — | 7,886 | 19–18 |
| 39 | May 29 | @ Expos | 2–3 | Sanderson | **Bibby** (3–3) | Lee | 36,662 | 19–19 |
| 40 | May 30 | @ Expos | 3–2 | **Rhoden** (6–0) | Gullickson | — | 31,649 | 20–19 |
| 41 | May 31 | @ Expos | 1–5 | Rogers | **Perez** (2–1) | — | 45,784 | 20–20 |

June: 5–3 (Home: 5–3; Away: 0–0)

| # | Date | Opponent | Score | Win | Loss | Save | Attendance | Record |
|---|---|---|---|---|---|---|---|---|
| 42 | June 2 | Cubs | 16–3 | **Solomon** (4–3) | Caudill | — | 6,437 | 21–20 |
| 43 | June 3 | Cubs | 3–2 | **Bibby** (4–3) | Martz | **Romo** (7) | 5,003 | 22–20 |
| 44 | June 4 | Cubs | 5–4 (10) | **Tekulve** (2–3) | McGlothen | — | 6,740 | 23–20 |
| 45 | June 5 | Giants | 3–5 | Breining | **Romo** (0–3) | Lavelle | 8,361 | 23–21 |
| 46 | June 6 | Giants | 7–6 | **Scurry** (2–2) | Griffin | **Tekulve** (1) | 11,362 | 24–21 |
| 47 | June 7 | Giants | 3–2 | **Solomon** (5–3) | Blue | **Romo** (8) | 32,244 | 25–21 |
| 48 | June 9 | Padres | 4–7 | Mura | **Rhoden** (6–1) | Lucas | 9,145 | 25–22 |
| 49 | June 10 | Padres | 2–3 | Eichelberger | **Perez** (2–2) | Lucas | 9,450 | 25–23 |

August: 7–15 (Home: 4–8; Away: 3–7)

| # | Date | Opponent | Score | Win | Loss | Save | Attendance | Record |
|---|---|---|---|---|---|---|---|---|
| 50 | August 10 | @ Expos | 1–3 | Lee | **Perez** (2–3) | — | 37,275 | 25–24 |
| 51 | August 11 | @ Expos | 6–3 | **Tekulve** (3–3) | Fryman | — | 33,045 | 26–24 |
| 52 | August 12 | Expos | 2–3 | Burris | **Solomon** (5–4) | Lee | 12,069 | 26–25 |
| 53 | August 13 | Expos | 2–7 | Rogers | **Tiant** (0–1) | — | 11,735 | 26–26 |
| 54 | August 15 | @ Cubs | 3–4 (15) | Martz | **Scurry** (2–3) | — | 15,388 | 26–27 |
| 55 | August 16 | @ Cubs | 4–3 (11) | **Tekulve** (4–3) | Smith | **Jackson** (2) | | 27–27 |
| 56 | August 16 | @ Cubs | 4–6 | Howell | **Perez** (2–4) | Martz | 18,991 | 27–28 |
| 57 | August 17 | Giants | 1–5 (11) | Minton | **Scurry** (2–4) | — | 7,117 | 27–29 |
| 58 | August 18 | Giants | 2–4 | Whitson | **Tiant** (0–2) | Minton | 9,362 | 27–30 |
| 59 | August 19 | Giants | 7–3 | **Jones** (1–0) | Alexander | **Jackson** (3) | 8,414 | 28–30 |
| 60 | August 21 | Padres | 4–2 | **Rhoden** (7–1) | Mura | **Jackson** (4) | | 29–30 |
| 61 | August 21 | Padres | 3–2 | **Bibby** (5–3) | Lollar | **Tekulve** (2) | 19,049 | 30–30 |
| 62 | August 22 | Padres | 6–7 | Curtis | **Tekulve** (4–4) | Lucas | 11,865 | 30–31 |
| 63 | August 23 | Padres | 5–2 | **Scurry** (3–4) | Welsh | **Romo** (9) | 23,736 | 31–31 |
| 64 | August 24 | Dodgers | 0–3 | Hooton | **Jones** (1–1) | — | 12,308 | 31–32 |
| 65 | August 25 | Dodgers | 7–9 (11) | Pena | **Tekulve** (4–5) | Niedenfuer | 16,770 | 31–33 |
| 66 | August 26 | Dodgers | 6–16 | Reuss | **Rhoden** (7–2) | — | 11,144 | 31–34 |
| 67 | August 27 | @ Giants | 4–5 (13) | Holland | **Robinson** (0–2) | — | 10,807 | 31–35 |
| 68 | August 28 | @ Giants | 1–5 | Whitson | **Scurry** (3–5) | — | 8,418 | 31–36 |
| 69 | August 29 | @ Giants | 3–8 | Alexander | **Tiant** (0–3) | — | 10,738 | 31–37 |
| 70 | August 30 | @ Giants | 0–5 | Griffin | **Perez** (2–5) | — | 18,117 | 31–38 |
| 71 | August 31 | @ Dodgers | 5–4 (10) | **Jones** (2–1) | Stewart | **Robinson** (1) | 35,862 | 32–38 |

September: 13–15 (Home: 6–5; Away: 7–10)

| # | Date | Opponent | Score | Win | Loss | Save | Attendance | Record |
|---|---|---|---|---|---|---|---|---|
| 72 | September 1 | @ Dodgers | 2–3 (14) | Niedenfuer | **Jones** (2–2) | — | 50,134 | 32–39 |
| 73 | September 2 | @ Dodgers | 2–6 | Welch | **Long** (0–1) | Pena | 32,027 | 32–40 |
| 74 | September 3 | @ Padres | 7–3 | **Tiant** (1–3) | Eichelberger | **Scurry** (2) | 6,153 | 33–40 |
| 75 | September 4 | @ Padres | 4–5 | Littlefield | **Robinson** (0–3) | Show | 8,128 | 33–41 |
| 76 | September 5 | @ Padres | 2–1 | **Rhoden** (8–2) | Mura | **Scurry** (3) | 7,297 | 34–41 |
| 77 | September 6 | @ Padres | 9–5 | **Solomon** (6–4) | Wise | **Robinson** (2) | 4,177 | 35–41 |
| 78 | September 7 | Mets | 2–1 | **Jones** (3–2) | Allen | **Scurry** (4) | | 36–41 |
| 79 | September 7 | Mets | 5–4 | **Long** (1–1) | Boitano | **Lee** (3) | 9,935 | 37–41 |
| 80 | September 8 | Mets | 1–3 | Lynch | **Tiant** (1–4) | Allen | 5,383 | 37–42 |
| 81 | September 9 | Mets | 3–5 | Leach | **Perez** (2–6) | Searage | 7,089 | 37–43 |
| 82 | September 11 | Phillies | 0–8 | Carlton | **Rhoden** (8–3) | — | 12,799 | 37–44 |
| 83 | September 12 | Phillies | 6–2 | **Solomon** (7–4) | Noles | **Scurry** (5) | 11,370 | 38–44 |
| 84 | September 13 | Phillies | 3–2 | **Jones** (4–2) | Reed | **Tekulve** (3) | 16,493 | 39–44 |
| 85 | September 15 | @ Cubs | 8–2 | **Tiant** (2–4) | Griffin | — | 5,254 | 40–44 |
| 86 | September 18 | @ Phillies | 7–6 | **Scurry** (4–5) | Reed | **Lee** (4) | 24,537 | 41–44 |
| 87 | September 19 | @ Phillies | 2–8 | Larson | **Jones** (4–3) | Christenson | 30,446 | 41–45 |
| 88 | September 20 | @ Phillies | 4–5 | Lyle | **Solomon** (7–5) | — | 31,489 | 41–46 |
| 89 | September 21 | @ Mets | 3–4 (13) | Boitano | **Lee** (0–1) | — | 7,429 | 41–47 |
| 90 | September 22 | @ Mets | 5–3 | **Bibby** (6–3) | Scott | **Scurry** (6) | 6,855 | 42–47 |
| 91 | September 23 | @ Expos | 2–3 | Jackson | **Rhoden** (8–4) | — | 10,081 | 42–48 |
| 92 | September 24 | @ Expos | 1–7 | Lee | **Jones** (4–4) | — | 23,459 | 42–49 |
| 93 | September 25 | @ Cardinals | 5–4 | **Solomon** (8–5) | Kaat | **Scurry** (7) | 15,377 | 43–49 |
| 94 | September 26 | @ Cardinals | 3–5 | Forsch | **Lee** (0–2) | Sutter | 19,761 | 43–50 |
| 95 | September 27 | @ Cardinals | 5–7 | LaPoint | **Perez** (2–7) | Sutter | 17,703 | 43–51 |
| 96 | September 28 | Cubs | 4–0 | **Rhoden** (9–4) | Griffin | — | | 44–51 |
| 97 | September 28 | Cubs | 1–3 | Geisel | **Long** (1–2) | Martz | 3,698 | 44–52 |
| 98 | September 29 | Cubs | 10–6 | **Romo** (1–3) | Tidrow | — | 3,439 | 45–52 |
| 99 | September 30 | Expos | 2–3 | Gullickson | **Solomon** (8–6) | Fryman | 5,826 | 45–53 |

October: 1–3 (Home: 1–3; Away: 0–0)

| # | Date | Opponent | Score | Win | Loss | Save | Attendance | Record |
|---|---|---|---|---|---|---|---|---|
| 100 | October 1 | Expos | 2–5 | Burris | **Tiant** (2–5) | Reardon | 2,931 | 45–54 |
| 101 | October 2 | Cardinals | 8–7 | **Tekulve** (5–5) | Sutter | — | 2,348 | 46–54 |
| 102 | October 3 | Cardinals | 3–8 | Martin | **Camacho** (0–1) | — | 3,589 | 46–55 |
| 103 | October 4 | Cardinals | 0–4 | Shirley | **Jones** (4–5) | — | 10,022 | 46–56 |

Legend: = Win = Loss = Tie
Bold = Pirates team member

== Roster ==
1981 Pittsburgh Pirates
Roster
| Pitchers: 26 Jim Bibby; 47 Ernie Camacho; 45 John Candelaria; 49 Víctor Cruz; 23 Grant Jackson; 22 Odell Jones; 46 Mark Lee; 34 Bob Long; 25 Pascual Pérez; 29 Rick Rhoden; 43 Don Robinson; 15 Enrique Romo; 19 Rod Scurry; 44 Eddie Solomon; 27 Kent Tekulve; 38 Luis Tiant | Catchers: 16 Steve Nicosia; 6 Tony Peña; Infielders: 35 Gary Alexander; 4 Dale Berra; 11 Kurt Bevacqua; 10 Tim Foli; 3 Phil Garner; 2 Vance Law; 5 Bill Madlock; 34 John Milner; 14 Willie Montañez; 3 Johnny Ray; 28 Bill Robinson; 8 Willie Stargell; 30 Jason Thompson | Outfielders: 36 Matt Alexander; 24 Mike Easler; 17 Lee Lacy; 18 Omar Moreno; 39 Dave Parker; Other batters: 12 Doe Boyland | Manager: 7 Chuck Tanner; Coaches: 31 Harvey Haddix (pitching); 32 Joe Lonnett (third base); 42 Alex Monchak (first base); 48 Bob Skinner (hitting) |

=== Opening Day Lineup ===
Opening Day Starters
| # | Name | Position |
|---|---|---|
| 18 | Omar Moreno | CF |
| 10 | Tim Foli | SS |
| 39 | Dave Parker | RF |
| 30 | Jason Thompson | 1B |
| 24 | Mike Easler | LF |
| 5 | Bill Madlock | 3B |
| 4 | Dale Berra | 2B |
| 16 | Steve Nicosia | C |
| 26 | Jim Bibby | P |

== Player stats ==
| = Indicates team leader |

| = Indicates league leader |

Batting

Note: G = Games played; AB = At bats; H = Hits; Avg. = Batting average; HR = Home runs; RBI = Runs batted in

Regular season
| Player | G | AB | H | Avg. | HR | RBI |
|---|---|---|---|---|---|---|
| M. Lee | 12 | 2 | 1 | 0.500 | 0 | 0 |
| M. Alexander | 15 | 11 | 4 | 0.364 | 0 | 0 |
| B. Madlock | 82 | 279 | 95 | 0.341 | 6 | 45 |
| T. Peña | 66 | 210 | 63 | 0.300 | 2 | 17 |
| M. Easler | 95 | 339 | 97 | 0.286 | 7 | 42 |
| W. Stargell | 38 | 60 | 17 | 0.283 | 0 | 9 |
| O. Moreno | 103 | 434 | 120 | 0.276 | 1 | 35 |
| L. Lacy | 78 | 213 | 57 | 0.268 | 2 | 10 |
| W. Montañez | 29 | 38 | 10 | 0.263 | 1 | 1 |
| K. Bevacqua | 29 | 27 | 7 | 0.259 | 1 | 4 |
| D. Parker | 67 | 240 | 62 | 0.258 | 9 | 48 |
| P. Garner | 56 | 181 | 46 | 0.254 | 1 | 20 |
| D. Robinson | 17 | 12 | 3 | 0.250 | 0 | 1 |
| T. Foli | 86 | 316 | 78 | 0.247 | 0 | 20 |
| J. Ray | 31 | 102 | 25 | 0.245 | 0 | 6 |
| J. Thompson | 86 | 223 | 54 | 0.242 | 15 | 42 |
| D. Berra | 81 | 232 | 56 | 0.241 | 2 | 27 |
| J. Milner | 34 | 59 | 14 | 0.237 | 2 | 9 |
| J. Candelaria | 6 | 13 | 3 | 0.231 | 0 | 3 |
| S. Nicosia | 54 | 169 | 39 | 0.231 | 2 | 18 |
| B. Robinson | 39 | 88 | 19 | 0.216 | 2 | 8 |
| G. Alexander | 21 | 47 | 10 | 0.213 | 1 | 6 |
| O. Jones | 13 | 10 | 2 | 0.200 | 0 | 0 |
| R. Rhoden | 21 | 48 | 9 | 0.188 | 0 | 0 |
| L. Tiant | 9 | 16 | 3 | 0.188 | 0 | 4 |
| E. Solomon | 25 | 43 | 7 | 0.163 | 0 | 3 |
| R. Scurry | 27 | 19 | 3 | 0.158 | 0 | 0 |
| J. Bibby | 14 | 28 | 4 | 0.143 | 1 | 3 |
| P. Pérez | 18 | 22 | 3 | 0.136 | 0 | 0 |
| V. Law | 30 | 67 | 9 | 0.134 | 0 | 3 |
| D. Boyland | 11 | 8 | 0 | 0.000 | 0 | 0 |
| E. Camacho | 7 | 4 | 0 | 0.000 | 0 | 0 |
| V. Cruz | 22 | 4 | 0 | 0.000 | 0 | 0 |
| G. Jackson | 35 | 2 | 0 | 0.000 | 0 | 0 |
| B. Long | 5 | 4 | 0 | 0.000 | 0 | 0 |
| E. Romo | 33 | 4 | 0 | 0.000 | 0 | 0 |
| K. Tekulve | 45 | 2 | 0 | 0.000 | 0 | 0 |
| Team totals | 103 | 3,576 | 920 | 0.257 | 55 | 384 |

Pitching

Note: G = Games pitched; IP = Innings pitched; W = Wins; L = Losses; ERA = Earned run average; SO = Strikeouts

Regular season
| Player | G | IP | W | L | ERA | SO |
|---|---|---|---|---|---|---|
| K. Tekulve | 45 | 65 | 5 | 5 | 2.49 | 34 |
| J. Bibby | 14 | 93 2/3 | 6 | 3 | 2.50 | 48 |
| G. Jackson | 35 | 32 1/3 | 1 | 2 | 2.51 | 17 |
| V. Cruz | 22 | 34 | 1 | 1 | 2.65 | 28 |
| M. Lee | 12 | 19 2/3 | 0 | 2 | 2.75 | 5 |
| E. Solomon | 22 | 127 | 8 | 6 | 3.12 | 38 |
| O. Jones | 13 | 54 1/3 | 4 | 5 | 3.31 | 30 |
| J. Candelaria | 6 | 40 2/3 | 2 | 2 | 3.54 | 14 |
| R. Scurry | 27 | 74 | 4 | 5 | 3.77 | 65 |
| R. Rhoden | 21 | 136 1/3 | 9 | 4 | 3.89 | 76 |
| L. Tiant | 9 | 57 1/3 | 2 | 5 | 3.92 | 32 |
| P. Pérez | 17 | 86 1/3 | 2 | 7 | 3.96 | 46 |
| E. Romo | 33 | 41 2/3 | 1 | 3 | 4.54 | 23 |
| E. Camacho | 7 | 21 2/3 | 0 | 1 | 4.98 | 11 |
| D. Robinson | 16 | 38 1/3 | 0 | 3 | 5.87 | 17 |
| B. Long | 5 | 19 2/3 | 1 | 2 | 5.95 | 8 |
| Team totals | 103 | 942 | 46 | 56 | 3.56 | 492 |

== Awards and honors ==
1981 Major League Baseball All-Star Game

- Dave Parker, RF, starter
- Bill Madlock, 3B, reserve
- Mike Easler, OF, reserve
- Phil Garner, 2B, reserve

== Transactions ==
- October 22, 1980 – Jesse Jefferson granted free agency.
- October 22, 1980 – John Milner granted free agency.
- October 29, 1980 – Traded a player to be named later and cash to the Seattle Mariners. Received Odell Jones. The Pittsburgh Pirates sent Larry Andersen (October 29, 1980) to the Seattle Mariners to complete the trade.
- December 9, 1980 – Traded Bert Blyleven and Manny Sanguillén to the Cleveland Indians. Received Gary Alexander, Victor Cruz, Bob Owchinko and Rafael Vasquez.
- January 13, 1981 – Drafted John Kruk in the 3rd round of the 1981 amateur draft (January), but did not sign the player.
- January 19, 1981 – Signed Larvell Blanks as a free agent.
- January 20, 1981 – Signed Rusty Torres as a free agent.
- January 23, 1981 – Signed John Milner as a free agent.
- February 23, 1981 – Signed Luis Tiant as a free agent.
- April 1, 1981 – Traded Mickey Mahler and Ed Ott to the California Angels. Received Jason Thompson.
- April 5, 1981 – Purchased Jim Smith from the Baltimore Orioles.
- April 5, 1981 – Traded Dave Dravecky to the San Diego Padres. Received Bobby Mitchell (minors).
- April 6, 1981 – Traded Bob Owchinko to the Oakland Athletics. Received a player to be named later and cash. The Oakland Athletics sent Ernie Camacho (April 10, 1981) to the Pittsburgh Pirates to complete the trade.
- May 4, 1981 – Signed Willie Horton as a free agent.
- June 8, 1981 – Drafted Ray Krawczyk in the 1st round (4th pick) of the 1981 amateur draft (June Secondary).
- June 8, 1981 – Drafted Jim Winn in the 1st round (14th pick) of the 1981 amateur draft.
- June 8, 1981 – Drafted Lee Tunnell in the 2nd round of the 1981 amateur draft.
- June 8, 1981 – Drafted Bip Roberts in the 5th round of the 1981 amateur draft, but did not sign the player.
- June 8, 1981 – Drafted Scott Bankhead in the 17th round of the 1981 amateur draft, but did not sign the player.
- June 8, 1981 – Drafted Chris Bosio in the 29th round of the 1981 amateur draft, but did not sign the player.
- June 8, 1981 – Drafted Lance Johnson in the 30th round of the 1981 amateur draft, but did not sign the player.
- June 25, 1981 – Signed Denny González as an amateur free agent.
- July 11, 1981 – Signed Bobby Bonilla as an amateur free agent.
- August 20, 1981 – Traded John Milner to the Montreal Expos. Received Willie Montañez.
- August 31, 1981 – Traded Phil Garner to the Houston Astros. Received players to be named later and Johnny Ray. The Houston Astros sent Randy Niemann (September 9, 1981) and Kevin Houston (minors) (September 9, 1981) to the Pittsburgh Pirates to complete the trade.
- September 1, 1981 – Sold Grant Jackson to the Montreal Expos for $50,000.
- October 5, 1981 – Released Luis Tiant.
- October 23, 1981 – Purchased Manny Sarmiento from the Boston Red Sox.
- October 26, 1981 – Released Kurt Bevacqua.

== Farm system ==
| Level | Team | League | Manager |
|---|---|---|---|
| AAA | Portland Beavers | Pacific Coast League | Pete Ward |
| AA | Buffalo Bisons | Eastern League | Johnny Lipon |
| A | Alexandria Pirates | Carolina League | Mike Toomey |
| A | Greenwood Pirates | South Atlantic League | Joe Frisina |
| Rookie | GCL Pirates | Gulf Coast League | Woody Huyke |
