= 1981 San Diego Padres season =

1981 San Diego Padres
- League: National League
- Division: West
- Ballpark: San Diego Stadium
- City: San Diego, California
- Record: 41–69 (.373)
- Divisional place: 6th
- Owners: Ray Kroc
- General managers: Jack McKeon
- Managers: Frank Howard
- Television: KFMB-TV
- Radio: KFMB (AM) (Ed Doucette, Dave Campbell, Jerry Coleman, Bob Chandler, Ted Leitner)

The 1981 San Diego Padres season was the 13th season in franchise history.

== Offseason ==
- December 8, 1980: Rollie Fingers, Bob Shirley, Gene Tenace and a player to be named later were traded by the Padres to the St. Louis Cardinals for Terry Kennedy, Steve Swisher, Mike Phillips, John Littlefield, John Urrea, Kim Seaman, and Al Olmsted. The Padres completed the deal by sending Bob Geren to the Cardinals on December 10.
- December 8, 1980: Chuck Baker was traded by the Padres to the Minnesota Twins for Dave Edwards.
- December 8, 1980: Mario Ramírez was selected by the Padres from the New York Mets in the rule 5 draft.
- December 15, 1980: Randy Jones was traded by the Padres to the New York Mets for John Pacella and José Moreno.
- December 15, 1980: Rick Sweet was purchased from the Padres by the Seattle Mariners.
- January 13, 1981: Eric Bullock was drafted by the San Diego Padres in the 1st round (5th pick) of the 1981 amateur draft (secondary phase), but did not sign.
- March 27, 1981: Tony Phillips, Kevin Bell and Eric Mustad (minors) was traded by the Padres to the Oakland Athletics for Bob Lacey and Roy Moretti (minors).
- March 27, 1981: Eric Rasmussen was released by the Padres.

== Regular season ==
=== Season standings ===
NL West
Team	W	L	Pct.	GB	Home	Road
Cincinnati Reds	66	42	.611	—	32‍–‍22	34‍–‍20
Los Angeles Dodgers	63	47	.573	4	33‍–‍23	30‍–‍24
Houston Astros	61	49	.555	6	31‍–‍20	30‍–‍29
San Francisco Giants	56	55	.505	11½	29‍–‍24	27‍–‍31
Atlanta Braves	50	56	.472	15	22‍–‍27	28‍–‍29
San Diego Padres	41	69	.373	26	20‍–‍35	21‍–‍34

NL West First Half Standings	W	L	Pct.	GB
Los Angeles Dodgers	36	21	.632	—
Cincinnati Reds	35	21	.625	1/2
Houston Astros	28	29	.491	8
Atlanta Braves	25	29	.463	9 1/2
San Francisco Giants	27	32	.458	10
San Diego Padres	23	33	.411	12 1/2

NL West Second Half Standings	W	L	Pct.	GB
Houston Astros	33	20	.623	—
Cincinnati Reds	31	21	.596	1 1/2
San Francisco Giants	29	23	.558	3 1/2
Los Angeles Dodgers	27	26	.509	6
Atlanta Braves	25	27	.481	7 1/2
San Diego Padres	18	36	.333	15 1/2

=== Record vs. opponents ===
1981 National League record Sources:
Team	ATL	CHC	CIN	HOU	LAD	MON	NYM	PHI	PIT	SD	SF	STL
Atlanta	—	3–2–1	6–5	4–8	7–7	3–7	3–3	4–5	2–3	9–6	5–7	4–3
Chicago	2–3–1	—	1–5	1–6	6–4	4–7	5–8–1	2–10	4–10	3–3	5–5	5–4–1
Cincinnati	5–6	5–1	—	8–4	8–8	5–4	7–3	5–2	4–2	10–2	9–5	0–5
Houston	8–4	6–1	4–8	—	4–8	5–2	6–3	4–6	2–4	11–3	9–6	2–4
Los Angeles	7–7	4–6	8–8	8–4	—	5–2	5–1	3–3	5–1	6–5	7–5	5–5
Montreal	7–3	7–4	4–5	2–5	2–5	—	9–3	7–4	10–3	4–2	2–5	6–9
New York	3–3	8–5–1	3–7	3–6	1–5	3–9	—	7–7	3–6–1	2–5	2–4	6–5
Philadelphia	5-4	10–2	2–5	6–4	3–3	4–7	7–7	—	7–5	4–2	4–3	7–6
Pittsburgh	3–2	10–4	2–4	4–2	1–5	3–10	6–3–1	5–7	—	6–4	3–7	3–8
San Diego	6–9	3–3	2–10	3–11	5–6	2–4	5–2	2–4	4–6	—	6–7	3–7
San Francisco	7–5	5–5	5–9	6–9	5–7	5–2	4–2	3–4	7–3	7–6	—	2–3
St. Louis	3–4	4–5–1	5–0	4–2	5–5	9–6	5–6	6–7	8–3	7–3	3–2	—

=== Notable transactions ===
- June 8, 1981: 1981 Major League Baseball draft
  - Kevin McReynolds was drafted by the Padres in the 1st round (6th pick).
  - Tony Gwynn was drafted by the Padres in the 3rd round. Player signed June 16, 1981.
  - Greg Booker was drafted by the Padres in the 10th round.
  - John Kruk was drafted by the San Diego Padres in the 3rd round of the Secondary Phase.

=== Roster ===
1981 San Diego Padres
Roster
Pitchers: 36 Mike Armstrong; 30 Danny Boone; 51 John Curtis; 13 Juan Eichelberger; 62 Steve Fireovid; 41 Fred Kuhaulua; 50 John Littlefield; 48 Tim Lollar; 25 Gary Lucas; 27 Steve Mura; 44 Eric Show; 38 John Urrea; 26 Chris Welsh; 40 Rick Wise	Catchers: 10 Doug Gwosdz; 16 Terry Kennedy; 9 Steve Swisher; Infielders: 5 Randy Bass; 3 Juan Bonilla; 8 Barry Evans; 6 Tim Flannery; 15 Broderick Perkins; 10 Mike Phillips; 14 Mario Ramírez; 4 Luis Salazar; 1 Ozzie Smith	Outfielders: 24 Dave Edwards; 22 Ruppert Jones; 18 Joe Lefebvre; 14 José Moreno; 17 Gene Richards; 20 Jerry Turner; 2 Alan Wiggins; Other batters: 7 Craig Stimac	Manager: 33 Frank Howard; Coaches: 37 Ed Brinkman (Bench); 23 Chuck Estrada (Pitching); 34 Jack Krol (Third Base); 28 Bobby Tolan (Hitting & First Base)

== Player stats ==
= Indicates team leader

= Indicates league leader

=== Batting ===
==== Starters by position ====
Note: Pos = Position; G = Games played; AB = At bats; H = Hits; Avg. = Batting average; HR = Home runs; RBI = Runs batted in

Pos	Player	G	AB	H	Avg.	HR	RBI
C	Terry Kennedy	101	382	115	.301	2	41
1B	Broderick Perkins	92	254	71	.280	2	40
2B	Juan Bonilla	99	369	107	.290	1	25
SS	Ozzie Smith	110*	450	100	.222	0	21
3B	Luis Salazar	109	400	121	.303	3	38
LF	Gene Richards	104	393	113	.288	3	42
CF	Ruppert Jones	105	397	99	.249	4	39
RF	Joe Lefebvre	86	246	63	.256	8	31

- Tied with Steve Garvey (LAD)

==== Other batters ====
Note: G = Games played; AB = At bats; H = Hits; Avg. = Batting average; HR = Home runs: RBI = Runs batted in

Player	G	AB	H	Avg.	HR	RBI
Randy Bass	69	176	37	.210	4	20
Dave Edwards	58	112	24	.214	2	13
Barry Evans	54	93	30	.323	0	7
Tim Flannery	37	67	17	.254	0	6
José Moreno	34	48	11	.229	0	6
Jerry Turner	33	31	7	.226	2	6
Mike Phillips	14	29	6	.207	0	0
Steve Swisher	16	28	4	.143	0	0
Doug Gwosdz	16	24	4	.167	0	3
Alan Wiggins	15	14	5	.357	0	0
Mario Ramírez	13	13	1	.077	0	1
Craig Stimac	9	9	1	.111	0	0

=== Pitching ===
==== Starting pitchers ====
Note: G = Games pitched; IP = Innings pitched; W = Wins; L = Losses; ERA = Earned run average; SO = Strikeouts

Player	G	IP	W	L	ERA	SO
Juan Eichelberger	25	141.1	8	8	3.50	81
Steve Mura	23	138.2	5	14*	4.28	70
Chris Welsh	22	123.2	6	7	3.78	51
Rick Wise	18	98.0	4	8	3.77	27
Fred Kuhaulua	5	29.1	1	0	2.45	16
Steve Fireovid	5	26.1	0	1	2.73	11

- Tied with Pat Zachry (NYM)

==== Other pitchers ====
Note: G = Games pitched; IP = Innings pitched; W = Wins; L = Losses; ERA = Earned run average; SO = Strikeouts

Player	G	IP	W	L	ERA	SO
Tim Lollar	24	76.2	2	8	6.10	38
John Curtis	28	66.2	2	6	5.13	31

==== Relief pitchers ====
Note: G = Games pitched; IP = Innings pitched; W = Wins; L = Losses; SV = Saves; ERA = Earned run average; SO = Strikeouts

Player	G	IP	W	L	SV	ERA	SO
Gary Lucas	57	90.0	7	7	13	2.00	53
John Littlefield	42	64.0	2	3	2	3.66	19
John Urrea	38	49.0	2	2	2	2.39	19
Danny Boone	37	63.1	1	0	2	2.84	43
Eric Show	15	23.0	1	3	3	3.13	22
Mike Armstrong	10	12.0	0	2	0	6.00	9

== Awards and honors ==
- Ozzie Smith, SS, Gold Glove Award
- Ozzie Smith, National League Leader Games Played (110)
- Ozzie Smith, National League Leader At-Bats (450)

1981 Major League Baseball All-Star Game

== Farm system ==
Level	Team	League	Manager
AAA	Hawaii Islanders	Pacific Coast League	Doug Rader
AA	Amarillo Gold Sox	Texas League	Eddie Watt
A	Reno Silver Sox	California League	Jack Maloof
A	Salem Redbirds	Carolina League	Glenn Ezell
A-Short Season	Walla Walla Padres	Northwest League	Bill Bryk
Rookie	GCL Padres	Gulf Coast League	Jim Zerilla
