= Leon Durham =

American baseball player & coach (born 1957)

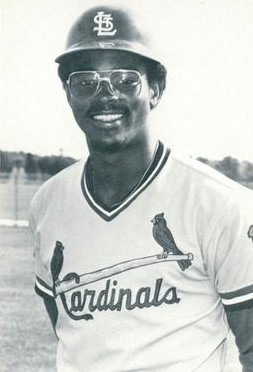
- Durham with the Cardinals in 1980
- First baseman / Outfielder
- Born: July 31, 1957 (age 68); Cincinnati, Ohio, U.S.
- Batted: Left Threw: Left

MLB debut
- May 27, 1980, for the St. Louis Cardinals

Last MLB appearance
- September 17, 1989, for the St. Louis Cardinals

MLB statistics
- Batting average: .277
- Home runs: 147
- Runs batted in: 530
- Stats at Baseball Reference

Teams
- St. Louis Cardinals (1980); Chicago Cubs (1981–1988); Cincinnati Reds (1988); St. Louis Cardinals (1989)

Career highlights and awards
- 2× All-Star (1982, 1983); Silver Slugger Award (1982)

Leon "Bull" Durham (born July 31, 1957) is an American former first baseman and outfielder in Major League Baseball who played for 10 seasons. Durham was a longtime minor league hitting coach, and most recently served as the assistant hitting coach for the Detroit Tigers during the 2017 season. Durham played with the St. Louis Cardinals (1980, 1989), Chicago Cubs (1981–1988), and Cincinnati Reds (1988). Durham batted and threw left-handed.

== Early life ==
Durham graduated from Cincinnati Woodward High School in 1976 where he was a high school All-American selection his senior year, posting a .385 batting average with 16 home runs and an 11–3 record as a pitcher.

== Playing career ==
Durham was selected by the St. Louis Cardinals in the 1976 amateur draft in the first round and 15th overall.

Durham made his major league debut on May 27, 1980, with the St. Louis Cardinals. He was traded that off-season to the Cubs for Bruce Sutter, and his career took off. He hit 10 home runs and drove in 55 runs in a strike-shortened 1981 season, then followed that with a stellar 1982 season in which he had a .312 batting average with 22 homers, 90 RBI, and 28 stolen bases. He won the Silver Slugger Award as the Cubs' left fielder and made the All-Star team. He followed that with a hot first half in 1983 of 12 homers and 55 RBI and another All-Star Game appearance, but was injured shortly after the break and missed the rest of the season.

In 1984, the Cubs made several team-improving deals. They acquired Bob Dernier and Gary Matthews from the Phillies, moved Keith Moreland to right field, and Durham to first base. Durham essentially supplanted Bill Buckner, who was then dealt to the Red Sox for Dennis Eckersley. Durham responded with another stellar year by hitting .279 with 23 homers and 96 RBIs as the Cubs won the National League East. For good measure, Durham homered in both Games 4 and 5 of the 1984 NLCS. Durham would follow that season with three more consecutive 20-homer seasons, including a career-high 27 in 1987. However, his RBI totals decreased from 96 in 1984 to 75, 65, and 63, respectively.

In 1988, Durham got off to a miserable start, hitting only .218 with 3 homers after 21 games. Mark Grace began to see more time at first, and the Cubs traded Durham to the Cincinnati Reds for Pat Perry amid rumors of drug use. Durham played in only 21 games for the Reds that season before entering into drug and alcohol rehabilitation. He tried a comeback with the Cardinals the next season, but was suspended for 60 days for failing to comply with the commissioner's drug policy and only went 1 for 18 before retiring.

In a 10-year Major League career, Durham compiled a lifetime batting average of .277, hitting 147 home runs and driving in 530 runs. He recorded an overall .991 fielding percentage playing primarily at first base and all three outfield positions.

In 1990, Durham played in 36 games for the Salinas Spurs of the High-A California League.

In 1993, Durham played for the then Northern League's Saint Paul Saints.

=== 1984 National League Championship Series ===
Leon Durham is widely remembered for an error that he made at first base during the 1984 National League Championship Series. In the bottom of the seventh inning in the decisive fifth game between Durham's Chicago Cubs and the San Diego Padres, the Padres sent pinch-hitter Tim Flannery to face the Cubs' ace pitcher Rick Sutcliffe.

Through the top of the sixth inning, the Cubs had a 3–0 lead, aided by Durham's home run off Eric Show in the first inning. In the bottom of the sixth inning, the Padres cut the Cubs' lead to 3–2 with a pair of singles by Alan Wiggins and Tony Gwynn, a walk to Steve Garvey, and sacrifice flies by Graig Nettles and Terry Kennedy. The bottom of the seventh inning kicked off with Carmelo Martínez walking on four pitches from Sutcliffe. Garry Templeton then sacrificed Martínez to second, setting things up for Tim Flannery. Martinez would then score when Flannery hit a sharp grounder that trickled through Leon Durham's legs for an error.

Groundball hit to Durham...RIGHT THROUGH HIS LEGS!!! Here comes Martínez, we're tied at three!

— ABC's Don Drysdale calling Cubs first basemen Leon Durham's crucial error in the bottom of the seventh inning in Game 5 of the 1984 NLCS.

The error became known as the "Gatorade Glove Play" because before taking his position in the field that inning, Gatorade was spilled on Durham's glove. Some Cub fans believe the Gatorade spilled on Durham's glove amounted to a curse, similar to the goat and, later, Bartman curses of Cub lore.

Instead of the Cubs maintaining a 3–2 lead with two outs and a runner at third, the game was now tied 3–3 with a runner at first and just one out. An Alan Wiggins single followed, and Tony Gwynn's hard hit ball skipped over second baseman Ryne Sandberg for a two-RBI double. The Padres scored another run in the inning, and went on to win 6–3 to reach the World Series for the first time ever. The Cubs had won the first 2 games of the series (1984 marked the last time that the League Championship Series was a best-of-five series) over the Padres. Incidentally, Durham went 3-for-20 in the NLCS, garnering two of his three hits in the final two games on home runs (his shot in Game 4 had given the Cubs a 3–2 lead).

The play would also turn out to be very similar, in style and effect, to Bill Buckner's much-discussed error in the 1986 World Series. The coincidental connection between these two events is that Durham had been moved from the outfield to first base during the 1984 season, replacing Buckner after the Cubs traded him to the Boston Red Sox for pitcher Dennis Eckersley. Buckner's error, like Durham's, would be seen as turning a post-season series around. The same joke even circulated for both incidents: That they had been despondent, jumped in front of a moving truck, and "the truck went between their legs".

== Coaching career ==
Durham previously served as the hitting coach for the Detroit Tigers' Triple-A affiliate the Toledo Mud Hens. On October 21, 2016, he was named the assistant hitting coach of the Detroit Tigers, after 17 seasons as a coach with the Mud Hens. Durham is presently in his second year as the hitting coach for the Louisville Bats the Triple-A affiliate of the Cincinnati Reds.

== In other media ==
- Durham had a supporting role as Leon Alexander, a member of the Minnesota Twins, in the film Little Big League.
- Durham appears briefly in the movie Ferris Bueller's Day Off. He is the first baseman in the sequence where Braves outfielder Claudell Washington hits a foul ball caught by the eponymous character.

Preceded by Tony Gwynn	National League Player of the Month; May 1984	Succeeded by Ryne Sandberg
