= Pat Tabler =

American baseball player and analyst (born 1958)

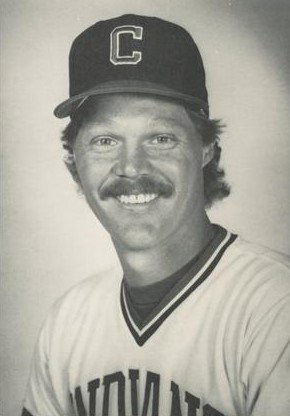
- First baseman / Designated hitter / Outfielder
- Born: February 2, 1958 (age 68); Hamilton, Ohio, U.S.
- Batted: Right Threw: Right

MLB debut
- August 21, 1981, for the Chicago Cubs

Last MLB appearance
- October 4, 1992, for the Toronto Blue Jays

MLB statistics
- Batting average: .282
- Home runs: 47
- Runs batted in: 512
- Stats at Baseball Reference

Teams
- Chicago Cubs (1981–1982); Cleveland Indians (1983–1988); Kansas City Royals (1988–1990); New York Mets (1990); Toronto Blue Jays (1991–1992)

Career highlights and awards
- All-Star (1987); World Series champion (1992)

Patrick Sean Tabler (born February 2, 1958) is an American former Major League Baseball player. After retiring from professional baseball, he became a color analyst for the Toronto Blue Jays on the Canadian sports television networks TSN and Sportsnet from 2001 to 2022.

== Playing career ==
Tabler graduated from St. Mary's Elementary school in Hyde Park, Ohio, followed by Archbishop McNicholas High School in Cincinnati. Tabler was a first round draft pick of the New York Yankees (sixteenth overall) in 1976, and entered the organization as an outfielder, but never reached the majors with the Yankees. On August 19, 1981, he was traded to the Chicago Cubs for players to be named later (the Cubs sent Bill Caudill and Jay Howell to the Yankees in 1982 to complete the transaction).

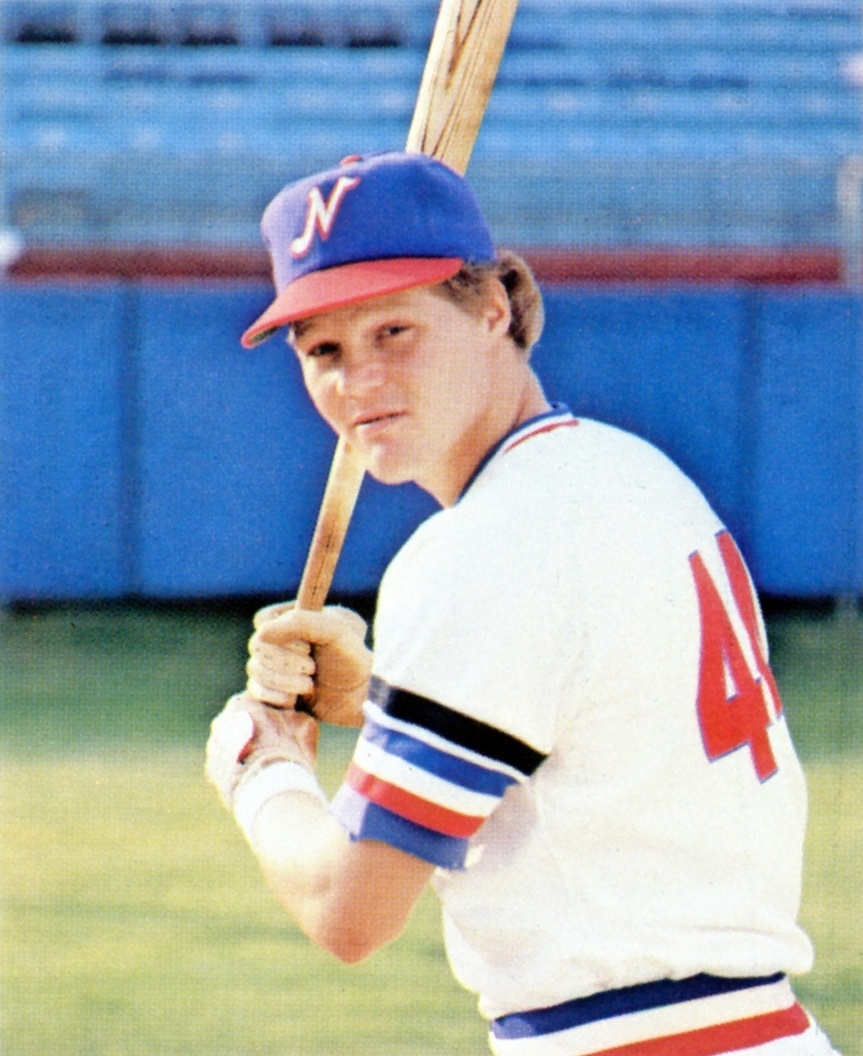
Tabler with the Nashville Sounds in 1980

=== Chicago Cubs ===
Tabler made his debut with the Cubs in 1981 as a second baseman, hitting .188 in 35 games. In 1982, the Cubs moved him to third base, and he hit .235 while playing in 25 games. On January 25, 1983, the Cubs traded Tabler along with Scott Fletcher, Randy Martz, and Dick Tidrow to the Chicago White Sox in exchange for Steve Trout and Warren Brusstar.

=== Cleveland Indians ===
On April 1, 1983, he was traded to the Cleveland Indians in exchange for Jerry Dybzinski and became their starting first baseman. That year, he hit .291 in 124 games. He became quickly known as a line drive hitter and continued to have modest success at the plate. His best season was in 1987 when he became an all-star, hitting .307 with 11 home runs and 86 runs batted in. Along with first base, he was well suited for the designated hitter role he inherited from Andre Thornton in 1987. He played in Cleveland until 1988, when he was traded to the Kansas City Royals for pitcher Bud Black.

=== Kansas City Royals ===
He played for Kansas City until the 1990 season, when he was traded to the New York Mets.

=== Toronto Blue Jays ===
Tabler finished his career with the Toronto Blue Jays (1991–1992), winning a World Series championship with the club in his final year as a player. Tabler was also known as a clutch hitter and for his ability to hit with the bases loaded, batting just under .500 in such situations (43 for 88) for his career.

== Broadcasting career ==
After his retirement, Tabler joined TSN as a studio analyst for Toronto Blue Jays broadcasts in 1993. After the network's color commentator, former Blue Jays catcher Buck Martinez, was named the team's manager in 2001, Tabler replaced him in the broadcast booth alongside play-by-play announcer Dan Shulman. He continued as TSN color analyst when Rod Black replaced Shulman, who left for ESPN. Tabler took over as the main color commentator for TSN's main rival, Rogers Sportsnet in 2005 after the sudden death of their regular commentator, former pitcher John Cerutti, calling the majority of games for both networks from 2005 to 2009 alongside Jamie Campbell and Rod Black.

Tabler worked exclusively for Sportsnet, which is the exclusive Toronto Blue Jays broadcaster. His partners were Martinez, who returned to the Blue Jays broadcast booth as play-by-play announcer in 2010, and Shulman, who returned as a part-time announcer in 2016. On September 25, 2014, Rogers announced a five-year extension with Tabler. On December 2, 2022, Tabler and Sportsnet parted ways. Prior to the 2023 season, he joined the Bally Sports Great Lakes as a color commentator for select Cleveland Guardians games.
