= Jeff Ransom =

American baseball player (born 1960)

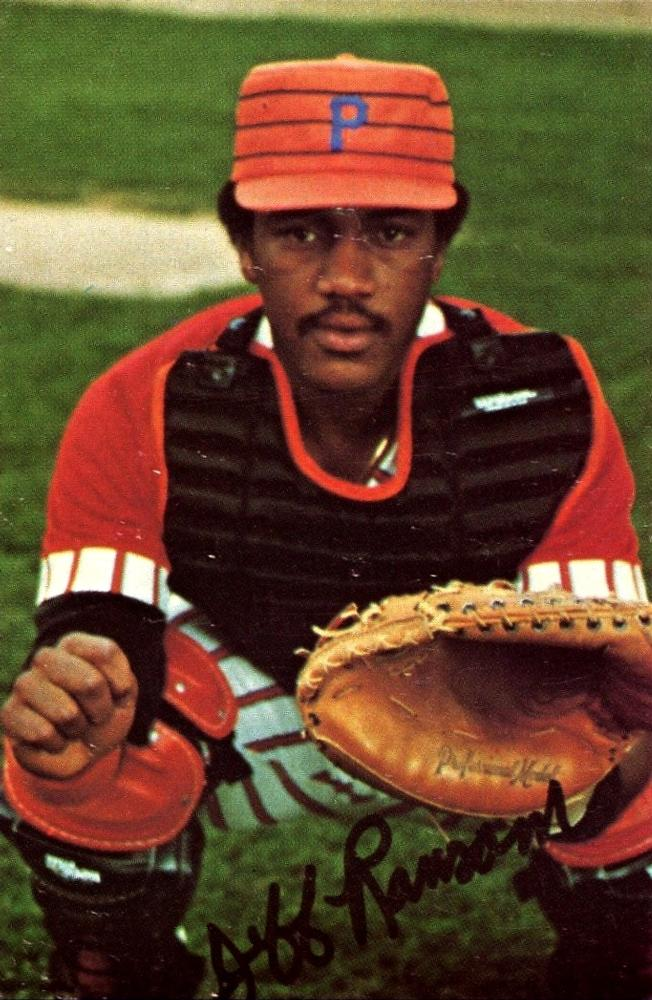
- Catcher
- Born: November 11, 1960 (age 65); Berkeley, California, U.S.
- Bats: Right Throws: Right

MLB debut
- September 5, 1981, San Francisco Giants

Last MLB appearance
- October 2, 1983, San Francisco Giants

MLB statistics
- Batting average: .190
- Home runs: 1
- Runs batted in: 6
- Stats at Baseball Reference

Teams
- San Francisco Giants (1981–1983)

Jeffrey Dean Ransom (born November 11, 1960) is an American former Major League Baseball player from Fresno, California.

== Career ==
Drafted in the 5th round of the 1978 amateur draft by the San Francisco Giants, Ransom appeared in 26 games as a catcher for the Giants from 1981 to 1983.
