= Mike Proly =

American baseball player (born 1950)

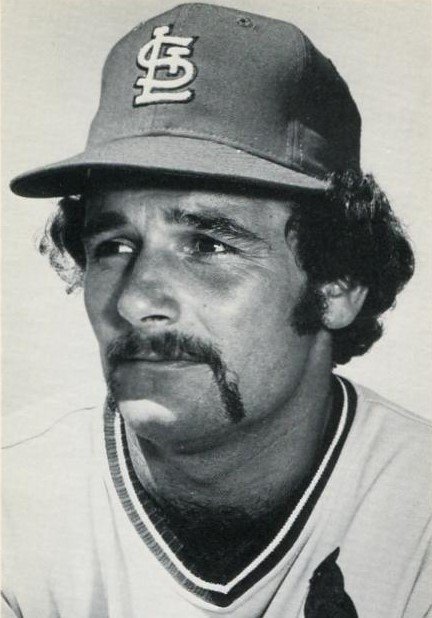
- Pitcher
- Born: December 15, 1950 (age 75); Jamaica, New York, U.S.
- Batted: Right Threw: Right

MLB debut
- April 10, 1976, for the St. Louis Cardinals

Last MLB appearance
- October 2, 1983, for the Chicago Cubs

MLB statistics
- Win–loss record: 22–29
- Earned run average: 3.23
- Strikeouts: 185
- Stats at Baseball Reference

Teams
- St. Louis Cardinals (1976); Chicago White Sox (1978–1980); Philadelphia Phillies (1981); Chicago Cubs (1982–1983)

Michael James Proly (born December 15, 1950) is an American former Major League Baseball pitcher who played from 1976 to 1983 for the St. Louis Cardinals, Chicago White Sox, Philadelphia Phillies, and Chicago Cubs.

Mike attended Chaminade High School and was selected by the St. Louis Cardinals in the 9th round (213th overall) of the 1972 MLB June Amateur Draft from St. John's University in Queens, NY.

== See also ==
- Chicago White Sox all-time roster
