= George Enright =

American baseball player (born 1954)

- Catcher
- Born: May 9, 1954 (age 71); New Britain, Connecticut, U.S.
- Batted: Right Threw: Right

MLB debut
- August 8, 1976, for the Chicago White Sox

Last MLB appearance
- September 7, 1976, for the Chicago White Sox

MLB statistics
- Games played: 2
- At bats: 1
- Hits: 0
- Stats at Baseball Reference

Teams
- Chicago White Sox (1976)

George Albert Enright (born May 9, 1954) is an American former catcher in Major League Baseball. He played for the Chicago White Sox in 1976.
