= Jay Howell =

American baseball player (born 1955)

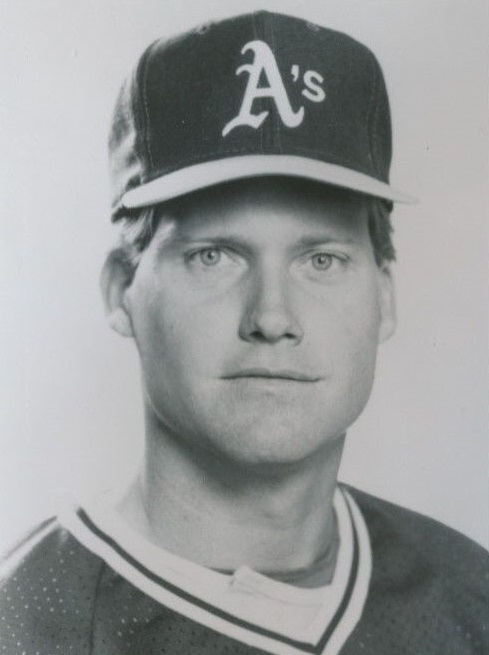
- Howell in 1986
- Pitcher
- Born: November 26, 1955 (age 70); Miami, Florida, U.S.
- Batted: Right Threw: Right

MLB debut
- August 10, 1980, for the Cincinnati Reds

Last MLB appearance
- August 8, 1994, for the Texas Rangers

MLB statistics
- Win–loss record: 58–53
- Earned run average: 3.34
- Strikeouts: 666
- Saves: 155
- Stats at Baseball Reference

Teams
- Cincinnati Reds (1980); Chicago Cubs (1981); New York Yankees (1982–1984); Oakland Athletics (1985–1987); Los Angeles Dodgers (1988–1992); Atlanta Braves (1993); Texas Rangers (1994)

Career highlights and awards
- 3× All-Star (1985, 1987, 1989); World Series champion (1988)

Jay Canfield Howell (born November 26, 1955) is an American former Major League Baseball relief pitcher for the Cincinnati Reds (1980), Chicago Cubs (1981), New York Yankees (1982–1984), Oakland Athletics (1985–1987), Los Angeles Dodgers (1988–1992), Atlanta Braves (1993) and Texas Rangers (1994).

== Early years ==
Howell attended Fairview High School and the University of Colorado.

== Career ==
He was selected in the 31st Round of the 1976 Major League Baseball Draft. He was the last player selected and signed in that draft to play in the Major Leagues.

Howell was a member of the Los Angeles Dodgers when they won the 1988 World Series. In the third game of the National League Championship Series against the New York Mets, Howell was ejected for having pine tar, an illegal substance, in his glove, though he said the only reason he used it was to get a better grip on the ball. He was suspended for three days, but it was shortened to two days.

He was named to two American League All-Star Teams in 1985 and 1987 and the 1989 National League All-Star Team.

He currently ranks 79th on the Major League Baseball Career Saves List (155) and 83rd on the Career Games Finished List (360).

== Coaching experience ==
Howell coached Cal State Northridge from 1998 to 2005 where he led the Matadors to two Big Sky Conference Titles. Major League player Kameron Loe played for Howell.
