= 1981 Los Angeles Dodgers season =

Major League Baseball season

1981 Los Angeles Dodgers
- World Series champions National League champions National League West co-champion
- League: National League
- Division: West
- Ballpark: Dodger Stadium
- City: Los Angeles
- Record: 63–47 (.573) (Overall); 36–21 (.632) (First half); 27–26 (.509) (Second half)
- Divisional place: 2nd (Overall); 1st (First half); 4th (Second half)
- Owners: Peter O'Malley
- General managers: Al Campanis
- Managers: Tommy Lasorda
- Television: KTTV–TV 11 (Vin Scully, Jerry Doggett, Ross Porter); ONTV (Geoff Witcher, Al Downing)
- Radio: KABC–AM 790 (Vin Scully, Jerry Doggett, Ross Porter); KTNQ–AM 1020 (Jaime Jarrín, Rudy Hoyos)

The 1981 Los Angeles Dodgers season was the 92nd season for the Los Angeles Dodgers franchise in Major League Baseball (MLB), their 24th season in Los Angeles, California, and their 20th season playing their home games at Dodger Stadium. The season got off to a strong start when rookie pitcher Fernando Valenzuela pitched a shutout on opening day, starting the craze that came to be known as "Fernandomania." Fernando went on to win both the Rookie of the Year and Cy Young Awards.

The season was divided into two halves because of a two-month long mid-season players' strike. The Dodgers won the National League West in the first half and advanced to the playoffs. They beat the Houston Astros in the NLDS and the Montreal Expos in the NLCS before beating the New York Yankees to win the World Series.

== Offseason ==
- December 4, 1980: Don Sutton signed with the Houston Astros as a free agent.
- March 30, 1981: Acquired Ken Landreaux from the Minnesota Twins for Mickey Hatcher and Matt Reeves

== Regular season ==
=== Season standings ===
NL West
Team	W	L	Pct.	GB	Home	Road
Cincinnati Reds	66	42	.611	—	32‍–‍22	34‍–‍20
Los Angeles Dodgers	63	47	.573	4	33‍–‍23	30‍–‍24
Houston Astros	61	49	.555	6	31‍–‍20	30‍–‍29
San Francisco Giants	56	55	.505	11½	29‍–‍24	27‍–‍31
Atlanta Braves	50	56	.472	15	22‍–‍27	28‍–‍29
San Diego Padres	41	69	.373	26	20‍–‍35	21‍–‍34

NL West First Half Standings	W	L	Pct.	GB
Los Angeles Dodgers	36	21	.632	—
Cincinnati Reds	35	21	.625	1/2
Houston Astros	28	29	.491	8
Atlanta Braves	25	29	.463	9 1/2
San Francisco Giants	27	32	.458	10
San Diego Padres	23	33	.411	12 1/2

NL West Second Half Standings	W	L	Pct.	GB
Houston Astros	33	20	.623	—
Cincinnati Reds	31	21	.596	1 1/2
San Francisco Giants	29	23	.558	3 1/2
Los Angeles Dodgers	27	26	.509	6
Atlanta Braves	25	27	.481	7 1/2
San Diego Padres	18	36	.333	15 1/2

=== Record vs. opponents ===
1981 National League record Sources:
Team	ATL	CHC	CIN	HOU	LAD	MON	NYM	PHI	PIT	SD	SF	STL
Atlanta	—	3–2–1	6–5	4–8	7–7	3–7	3–3	4–5	2–3	9–6	5–7	4–3
Chicago	2–3–1	—	1–5	1–6	6–4	4–7	5–8–1	2–10	4–10	3–3	5–5	5–4–1
Cincinnati	5–6	5–1	—	8–4	8–8	5–4	7–3	5–2	4–2	10–2	9–5	0–5
Houston	8–4	6–1	4–8	—	4–8	5–2	6–3	4–6	2–4	11–3	9–6	2–4
Los Angeles	7–7	4–6	8–8	8–4	—	5–2	5–1	3–3	5–1	6–5	7–5	5–5
Montreal	7–3	7–4	4–5	2–5	2–5	—	9–3	7–4	10–3	4–2	2–5	6–9
New York	3–3	8–5–1	3–7	3–6	1–5	3–9	—	7–7	3–6–1	2–5	2–4	6–5
Philadelphia	5-4	10–2	2–5	6–4	3–3	4–7	7–7	—	7–5	4–2	4–3	7–6
Pittsburgh	3–2	10–4	2–4	4–2	1–5	3–10	6–3–1	5–7	—	6–4	3–7	3–8
San Diego	6–9	3–3	2–10	3–11	5–6	2–4	5–2	2–4	4–6	—	6–7	3–7
San Francisco	7–5	5–5	5–9	6–9	5–7	5–2	4–2	3–4	7–3	7–6	—	2–3
St. Louis	3–4	4–5–1	5–0	4–2	5–5	9–6	5–6	6–7	8–3	7–3	3–2	—

=== Opening Day lineup ===
Opening Day starters
Name	Position
Davey Lopes	Second baseman
Ken Landreaux	Center fielder
Dusty Baker	Left fielder
Steve Garvey	First baseman
Ron Cey	Third baseman
Pedro Guerrero	Right fielder
Mike Scioscia	Catcher
Bill Russell	Shortstop
Fernando Valenzuela	Starting pitcher

=== Roster ===
1981 Los Angeles Dodgers
Roster
Pitchers: 37 Bobby Castillo; 51 Terry Forster; 38 Dave Goltz; 46 Burt Hooton; 57 Steve Howe; 49 Tom Niedenfuer; 26 Alejandro Peña; 25 Ted Power; 41 Jerry Reuss; 48 Dave Stewart; 43 Rick Sutcliffe; 34 Fernando Valenzuela; 35 Bob Welch	Catchers: 9 Jerry Grote; 14 Mike Scioscia; 7 Steve Yeager; Infielders: 10 Ron Cey; 36 Pepe Frías; 6 Steve Garvey; 15 Davey Lopes; 5 Mike Marshall; 45 Jack Perconte; 18 Bill Russell; 52 Steve Sax; 8 Reggie Smith; 30 Derrel Thomas; 1 Gary Weiss	Outfielders: 12 Dusty Baker; 22 Mark Bradley; 13 Joe Ferguson; 28 Pedro Guerrero; 21 Jay Johnstone; 44 Ken Landreaux; 47 Candy Maldonado; 17 Bobby Mitchell; 16 Rick Monday; 50 Ron Roenicke	Manager: 2 Tommy Lasorda; Coaches: 54 Monty Basgall; 58 Mark Cresse; 11 Manny Mota; 33 Danny Ozark; 29 Ron Perranoski

== Game log ==
=== Regular season ===
Legend
	Dodgers win
	Dodgers loss
	Postponement
	Clinched division
**Bold**	Dodgers team member

1981 regular season game log: 63–47 (Home: 33–23; Away: 30–24)
April: 14–5 (Home: 7–3; Away: 7–2)

#	Date	Time (PT)	Opponent	Score	Win	Loss	Save	Time of Game	Attendance	Record	Box Streak
1	April 9	1:11 p.m. PST	Astros	**W** 2–0	**Valenzuela** (1–0)	Niekro (0–1)	—	2:17	50,511	1–0	W1
2	April 11	7:08 p.m. PST	Astros	**W** 7–4	**Hooton** (1–0)	Sutton (0–1)	—	2:56	51,691	2–0	W2
3	April 12	1:08 p.m. PST	Astros	**W** 3–2	**Sutcliffe** (1–0)	Ruhle (0–1)	**Howe** (1)	2:16	50,734	3–0	W3
4	April 13	7:35 p.m. PST	@ Giants	**W** 4–3	**Stewart** (1–0)	Ripley (0–1)	**Castillo** (1)	2:54	20,698	4–0	W4
5	April 14	7:37 p.m. PST	@ Giants	**W** 7–1	**Valenzuela** (2–0)	Blue (0–1)	—	2:27	23,790	5–0	W5
6	April 15	7:35 p.m. PST	@ Giants	**W** 4–2	**Hooton** (2–0)	Whitson (0–1)	**Castillo** (2)	2:45	20,775	6–0	W6
10	April 20	5:35 p.m. PDT	@ Astros	**W** 5–2	**Hooton** (3–0)	Andújar (0–1)	**Goltz** (1)	2:34	21,730	9–1	W3
11	April 21	5:35 p.m. PDT	@ Astros	L 0–1	Knepper (1–0)	**Reuss** (0–1)	—	1:48	21,904	9–2	L1
12	April 22	5:35 p.m. PDT	@ Astros	**W** 1–0	**Valenzuela** (4–0)	Sutton (0–3)	—	2:24	22,830	10–2	W1
17	April 27	7:35 p.m. PDT	Giants	**W** 5–0	**Valenzuela** (5–0)	Griffin (1–2)	—	2:54	49,478	14–3	W3
18	April 28	7:35 p.m. PDT	Giants	L 1–6	Ripley (1–2)	**Sutcliffe** (2–1)	—	2:09	39,899	14–4	L1
19	April 29	7:35 p.m. PDT	Giants	L 2–3	Blue (2–2)	**Welch** (1–1)	Minton (3)	2:27	39,110	14–5	L2

May: 19–10 (Home: 9–3; Away: 10–7)

#	Date	Time (PT)	Opponent	Score	Win	Loss	Save	Time of Game	Attendance	Record	Box/ Streak
20	May 1	4:35 p.m. PDT	@ Expos	L 8–9 (13)	Lee (1–0)	**Castillo** (0–2)	—	4:18	28,179	14–6	L3
21	May 2	1:05 p.m. PDT	@ Expos	**W** 4–0	**Reuss** (2–1)	Sanderson (3–1)	—	2:23	22,820	15–6	W1
22	May 3	10:35 a.m. PDT	@ Expos	**W** 6–1 (10)	**Valenzuela** (6–0)	Gullickson (1–2)	—	2:55	46,405	16–6	W2
23	May 4	4:35 p.m. PDT	@ Expos	L 3–4	Rogers (3–1)	**Sutcliffe** (2–2)	Sosa (2)	3:04	21,507	16–7	L1
24	May 5	4:35 p.m. PDT	@ Phillies	L 7–8	Lyle (2–1)	**Castillo** (0–3)	—	2:58	27,241	16–8	L2
25	May 6	4:35 p.m. PDT	@ Phillies	**W** 2–1	**Hooton** (4–0)	Espinosa (1–2)	—	2:09	25,850	17–8	W1
26	May 7	4:35 p.m. PDT	@ Phillies	**W** 2–1	**Reuss** (3–1)	Bystrom (2–1)	—	2:12	29,259	18–8	W2
27	May 8	5:05 p.m. PDT	@ Mets	**W** 1–0	**Valenzuela** (6–0)	Scott (1–3)	—	2:42	39,848	19–8	W3
28	May 9	11:15 a.m. PDT	@ Mets	L 4–7	Allen (2–0)	**Castillo** (0–4)	Reardon (1)	2:53	16,776	19–9	L1
29	May 10	11:05 a.m. PDT	@ Mets	**W** 5–3	**Welch** (2–1)	Jones (0–5)	**Howe** (3)	2:43	12,102	20–9	W1
30	May 12	7:35 p.m. PDT	Expos	**W** 5–0	**Hooton** (5–0)	Burris (2–3)	**Howe** (4)	2:46	34,367	21–9	W2
31	May 13	7:35 p.m. PDT	Expos	**W** 8–6	**Howe** (2–1)	Fryman (2–1)	—	2:52	42,712	22–9	W3
32	May 14	7:35 p.m. PDT	Expos	**W** 3–2	**Valenzuela** (8–0)	Ratzer (1–1)	—	2:22	53,906	23–9	W4
33	May 15	7:35 p.m. PDT	Mets	**W** 6–5	**Howe** (3–1)	Allen (2–1)	—	2:35	49,860	24–9	W5
34	May 16	7:05 p.m. PDT	Mets	**W** 9–0	**Hooton** (6–0)	Roberts (0–3)	—	2:21	51,000	25–9	W6
35	May 17	1:05 p.m. PDT	Mets	**W** 6–1	**Reuss** (4–1)	Zachry (3–5)	—	2:17	50,746	26–9	W7
36	May 18	7:35 p.m. PDT	Phillies	L 0–4	Bystrom (3–2)	**Valenzuela** (8–1)	—	2:16	52,439	26–10	L1
37	May 19	7:35 p.m. PDT	Phillies	L 2–3	Ruthven (6–1)	**Welch** (2–2)	—	2:30	43,812	26–11	L2
38	May 20	7:35 p.m. PDT	Phillies	**W** 3–2 (10)	**Howe** (4–1)	McGraw (1–4)	—	2:30	50,917	27–11	W1
39	May 22	5:35 p.m. PDT	@ Reds	**W** 4–2 (12)	**Stewart** (2–0)	Bair (1–1)	—	3:15	27,943	28–11	W2
40	May 23	12:15 p.m. PDT	@ Reds	**W** 9–6 (10)	**Stewart** (3–0)	Mosaku (1–1)	**Castillo** (4)	3:17	40,928	29–11	W3
41 (1)	May 24	10:15 a.m. PDT	@ Reds	L 2–3	Mosaku (2–1)	**Welch** (2–3)	Price (1)	2:33	—	29–12	L1
42 (2)	May 24	1:18 p.m. PDT	@ Reds	**W** 10–3	**Castillo** (1–4)	Berenyi (4–2)	—	2:33	36,113	30–12	W1
46	May 29	7:35 p.m. PDT	Reds	**W** 5–2	**Welch** (3–3)	LaCoss (2–5)	**Howe** (5)	2:44	45,749	32–14	W1
47	May 30	1:05 p.m. PDT	Reds	L 1–9	Pastore (2–2)	**Hooton** (7–1)	—	2:46	43,582	32–15	L1
48	May 31	1:05 p.m. PDT	Reds	**W** 16–4	**Goltz** (1–0)	Soto (4–6)	—	3:08	46,411	33–15	W1

June: 3–6 (Home: 1–2; Away: 2–4)

#	Date	Time (PT)	Opponent	Score	Win	Loss	Save	Time of Game	Attendance	Record	Box/ Streak
52	June 5	11:25 a.m. PDT	@ Cubs	L 3–4	Reuschel (3–7)	**Reuss** (4–2)	Tidrow (4)	2:23	7,815	34–18	L3
53	June 6	11:15 a.m. PDT	@ Cubs	L 5–11	McGlothen (1–3)	**Valenzuela** (9–3)	—	2:58	30,556	34–19	L4
54	June 7	11:15 a.m. PDT	@ Cubs	**W** 7–0	**Welch** (4–3)	Martz (2–5)	—	2:35	20,024	35–19	W1
55	June 9	5:38 p.m. PDT	@ Cardinals	L 1–6	Forsch (6–2)	**Hooton** (7–3)	Sutter (10)	2:34	19,654	35–20	L1
56	June 10	5:37 p.m. PDT	@ Cardinals	**W** 4–1	**Reuss** (5–2)	Sorenson (5–5)	—	2:05	17,779	36–20	W1
57	June 11	5:39 p.m. PDT	@ Cardinals	L 1–2	Martínez (2–4)	**Valenzuela** (9–4)	Sutter (11)	2:01	39,250	36–21	L1
—	June 12	4:35 p.m. PDT	@ Pirates	Canceled (Strike)							
—	June 13	11:15 a.m. PDT	@ Pirates	Canceled (Strike)							
—	June 14	10:35 a.m. PDT	@ Pirates	Canceled (Strike)							
—	June 15	7:35 p.m. PDT	Cubs	Canceled (Strike)							
—	June 16	7:35 p.m. PDT	Cubs	Canceled (Strike)							
—	June 17	7:35 p.m. PDT	Cardinals	Canceled (Strike)							
—	June 18	7:35 p.m. PDT	Cardinals	Canceled (Strike)							
—	June 19	7:35 p.m. PDT	Pirates	Canceled (Strike)							
—	June 20	7:05 p.m. PDT	Pirates	Canceled (Strike)							
—	June 21	1:05 p.m. PDT	Pirates	Canceled (Strike)							
—	June 26	5:35 p.m. PDT	@ Astros	Canceled (Strike)							
—	June 27	5:35 p.m. PDT	@ Astros	Canceled (Strike)							
—	June 28	3:00 p.m. PDT	@ Astros	Canceled (Strike)							

July: 0–0 (Home: 0–0; Away: 0–0)

#	Date	Time (PT)	Opponent	Score	Win	Loss	Save	Time of Game	Attendance	Record	Box/ Streak
—	July 3	7:35 p.m. PDT	@ Giants	Canceled (Strike)							
—	July 4	1:05 p.m. PDT	@ Giants	Canceled (Strike)							
—	July 5	1:05 p.m. PDT	@ Giants	Canceled (Strike)							
—	July 7	7:30 p.m. PDT	Astros	Canceled (Strike)							
—	July 8	7:30 p.m. PDT	Astros	Canceled (Strike)							
—	July 9	1:05 p.m. PDT	Astros	Canceled (Strike)							
—	July 10	7:35 p.m. PDT	Giants	Canceled (Strike)							
—	July 11	7:05 p.m. PDT	Giants	Canceled (Strike)							
—	July 12	1:05 p.m. PDT	Giants	Canceled (Strike)							
—	July 16	4:35 p.m. PDT	@ Expos	Canceled (Strike)							
—	July 17	4:35 p.m. PDT	@ Expos	Canceled (Strike)							
—	July 18	4:05 p.m. PDT	@ Phillies	Canceled (Strike)							
—	July 19	10:35 a.m. PDT	@ Phillies	Canceled (Strike)							
—	July 20	4:35 p.m. PDT	@ Phillies	Canceled (Strike)							
—	July 21	5:05 p.m. PDT	@ Mets	Canceled (Strike)							
—	July 22	5:05 p.m. PDT	@ Mets	Canceled (Strike)							
—	July 23	5:05 p.m. PDT	@ Mets	Canceled (Strike)							
—	July 24	7:35 p.m. PDT	Expos	Canceled (Strike)							
—	July 25	7:05 p.m. PDT	Expos	Canceled (Strike)							
—	July 26	1:05 p.m. PDT	Expos	Canceled (Strike)							
—	July 27	7:35 p.m. PDT	Mets	Canceled (Strike)							
—	July 28	7:35 p.m. PDT	Mets	Canceled (Strike)							
—	July 29	7:35 p.m. PDT	Mets	Canceled (Strike)							
—	July 31	7:35 p.m. PDT	Phillies	Canceled (Strike)							

August: 12–9 (Home: 6–6; Away: 6–3)

#	Date	Time (PT)	Opponent	Score	Win	Loss	Save	Time of Game	Attendance	Record	Box/ Streak
—	August 1	1:05 p.m. PDT	Phillies	Canceled (Strike)							
—	August 2	1:05 p.m. PDT	Phillies	Canceled (Strike)							
—	August 4	4:35 p.m. PDT	@ Reds	Canceled (Strike)							
—	August 5	4:35 p.m. PDT	@ Reds	Canceled (Strike)							
—	August 9	5:35 p.m. PDT	52nd All-Star Game	National League vs. American League (Cleveland Stadium, Cleveland, Ohio)							
58	August 10	5:40 p.m. PDT	Reds	**W** 4–0	**Reuss** (6–2)	Pastore (3–3)	**Howe** (6)	2:08	35,120	37–21	W1
59	August 11	7:39 p.m. PDT	Reds	L 6–7	Brown (1–0)	**Forster** (0–1)	Hume (6)	2:50	45,817	37–22	L1
60	August 12	7:39 p.m. PDT	Reds	**W** 8–5	**Stewart** (4–1)	Seaver (7–2)	**Howe** (7)	2:48	36,494	38–22	W1
65	August 17	11:30 a.m. PDT	@ Cubs	L 1–3	Bird (7–1)	**Welch** (4–4)	—	2:23	10,153	40–25	L1
66	August 18	11:30 a.m. PDT	@ Cubs	**W** 5–0	**Hooton** (8–4)	Griffin (0–1)	—	2:33	15,973	41–25	W1
67	August 19	11:30 a.m. PDT	@ Cubs	L 3–4	Krokow (4–6)	**Goltz** (2–1)	Martz (2)	2:27	26,860	41–26	L1
68	August 21	5:38 p.m. PDT	@ Cardinals	**W** 4–0	**Reuss** (7–3)	Andújar (3–4)	—	2:05	33,375	42–26	W1
69	August 22	5:07 p.m. PDT	@ Cardinals	**W** 3–2	**Valenzuela** (10–4)	Forsch (7–3)	**Stewart** (2)	2:21	38,751	43–26	W2
70	August 23	11:07 a.m. PDT	@ Cardinals	L 7–11	Shirley (5–3)	**Welch** (4–5)	Sutter (15)	2:54	18,189	43–27	L1
71	August 24	4:35 p.m. PDT	@ Pirates	**W** 3–0	**Hooton** (9–4)	Jones (1–1)	—	2:14	12,308	44–27	W1
72	August 25	4:35 p.m. PDT	@ Pirates	**W** 9–7 (11)	**Peña** (1–0)	Tekulve (4–5)	**Niedenfuer** (1)	3:32	16,770	45–27	W2
73	August 26	9:35 a.m. PDT	@ Pirates	**W** 16–6	**Reuss** (8–3)	Rhoden (7–2)	—	3:07	11,144	46–27	W3
74	August 27	7:35 p.m. PDT	Cubs	**W** 6–0	**Valenzuela** (11–4)	Martz (4–6)	—	2:23	48,191	47–27	W4
75	August 28	7:35 p.m. PDT	Cubs	**W** 6–1	**Welch** (5–5)	Krokow (4–7)	**Stewart** (3)	2:37	42,160	48–27	W5
76	August 29	8:09 p.m. PDT	Cubs	L 1–3	Griffin (1–1)	**Hooton** (9–5)	Smith (1)	2:35	47,424	48–28	L1
77	August 30	1:08 p.m. PDT	Cubs	L 1–2	Bird (8–2)	**Goltz** (2–2)	Tidrow (7)	2:19	34,284	48–29	L2
78	August 31	7:30 p.m. PDT	Pirates	L 4–5 (10)	Jones (2–1)	**Stewart** (4–2)	Robinson (1)	2:58	35,862	48–30	L3

September: 13–15 (Home: 6–6; Away: 7–9)

#	Date	Time (PT)	Opponent	Score	Win	Loss	Save	Time of Game	Attendance	Record	Box/ Streak
79	September 1	7:30 p.m. PDT	Pirates	**W** 3–2 (14)	**Niedenfuer** (2–0)	Jones (2–2)	—	4:01	50,134	49–30	W1
80	September 2	7:30 p.m. PDT	Pirates	**W** 6–2	**Welch** (6–5)	Long (0–1)	**Peña** (2)	2:47	32,027	50–30	W2
81	September 3	7:37 p.m. PDT	Cardinals	L 3–5	Littell (1–1)	**Howe** (4–3)	Sutter (19)	2:19	30,122	50–31	L1
82	September 4	7:37 p.m. PDT	Cardinals	L 2–7	Martin (5–2)	**Goltz** (2–3)	—	2:19	48,114	50–32	L2
83	September 5	7:08 p.m. PDT	Cardinals	**W** 4–3 (11)	**Niedenfuer** (3–0)	Kaat (6–3)	—	3:32	36,058	51–32	W1
84	September 6	1:08 p.m. PDT	Cardinals	**W** 5–0	**Valenzuela** (12–4)	Forsch (7–5)	—	2:27	46,780	52–32	W2
85	September 7	5:05 p.m. PDT	Giants	**W** 5–1	**Welch** (7–5)	Whitson (5–7)	**Niedenfuer** (2)	2:35	49,561	53–32	W3
86	September 8	7:35 p.m. PDT	Giants	**W** 4–0	**Hooton** (10–5)	Alexander (8–6)	**Stewart** (4)	2:33	31,702	54–32	W4
87	September 9	7:35 p.m. PDT	Giants	L 3–6 (11)	Holland (6–4)	**Niedenfuer** (3–1)	—	3:36	31,482	54–33	L1
88	September 11	4:35 p.m. PDT	@ Reds	L 2–3 (10)	Price (5–1)	**Peña** (1–1)	—	2:42	25,237	54–34	L2
89	September 12	4:00 p.m. PDT	@ Reds	L 5–6 (11)	LaCoss (4–7)	**Power** (1–1)	—	3:32	34,090	54–35	L3
90	September 13	11:15 a.m. PDT	@ Reds	**W** 4–2	**Castillo** (2–4)	Pastore (3–7)	**Stewart** (5)	3:07	27,858	55–35	W1
95	September 18	7:35 p.m. PDT	Reds	L 4–5	Price (6–1)	**Stewart** (4–3)	Hume (10)	2:48	44,258	58–37	L1
96	September 19	7:05 p.m. PDT	Reds	L 3–7	Edelen (2–0)	**Hooton** (10–6)	—	3:22	48,352	58–38	L2
97	September 20	1:05 p.m. PDT	Reds	L 1–5	Soto (9–9)	**Power** (1–2)	—	2:45	39,560	58–39	L3
98	September 22	7:35 p.m. PDT	@ Giants	L 2–5	Whitson (6–8)	**Valenzuela** (13–5)	Minton (17)	3:11	28,046	58–40	L4
99	September 23	7:35 p.m. PDT	@ Giants	L 4–8	Lavelle (1–6)	**Goltz** (2–5)	Breining (1)	2:53	13,058	58–41	L5
100	September 24	7:35 p.m. PDT	@ Giants	**W** 7–3	**Welch** (8–5)	Griffin (8–8)	—	3:05	12,726	59–41	W1
101	September 25	5:35 p.m. PDT	@ Astros	**W** 3–0	**Hooton** (11–6)	Ruhle (4–5)	—	2:18	35,481	60–41	W2
102	September 26	11:20 a.m. PDT	@ Astros	L 0–5	Ryan (10–5)	**Power** (1–3)	—	2:46	32,115	60–42	L1
103	September 27	3:00 p.m. PDT	@ Astros	L 1–4	Sutton (11–8)	**Valenzuela** (13–6)	—	2:23	41,686	60–43	L2

October: 2–2 (Home: 2–2; Away: 0–0)

#	Date	Time (PT)	Opponent	Score	Win	Loss	Save	Time of Game	Attendance	Record	Box/ Streak
108	October 2	7:35 p.m. PDT	Astros	**W** 6–1	**Reuss** (10–4)	Sutton (11–9)	—	2:30	46,108	62–46	W1
109	October 3	12:50 p.m. PDT	Astros	**W** 7–2	**Welch** (9–5)	Niekro (9–9)	—	2:43	42,272	63–46	W2
110	October 4	1:05 p.m. PDT	Astros	L 3–5	Smith (5–3)	**Goltz** (2–7)	—	3:17	47,072	63–47	L1

=== Detailed records ===
**National League**
Opponent	Home	Away	Total	Pct.	Runs scored	Runs allowed
**NL East**
Chicago Cubs	2–2	2–4	4–6	.400	38	28
Montreal Expos	3–0	2–2	5–2	.714	37	22
New York Mets	3–0	2–1	5–1	.833	31	16
Philadelphia Phillies	1–2	2–1	3–3	.500	16	19
Pittsburgh Pirates	2–1	3–0	5–1	.833	41	22
St. Louis Cardinals	2–2	3–3	5–5	.500	34	37
	**13–7**	**14–11**	**27–18**	**.600**	**197**	**144**
**NL West**
Atlanta Braves	5–4	2–3	7–7	.500	48	49
Cincinnati Reds	4–5	4–3	8–8	.500	84	69
Houston Astros	5–1	3–3	8–4	.667	38	26
**Los Angeles Dodgers**	—	—	—	—	—	—
San Diego Padres	3–3	3–2	6–5	.545	35	30
San Francisco Giants	4–2	3–3	7–5	.583	48	38
	**21–14**	**15–14**	**36–29**	**.554**	**253**	**212**

==== Month-by-Month ====
===== First half =====
Month	Games	Won	Lost	Win %	RS	RA
April	19	14	5	0.737	64	38
May	29	19	10	0.655	144	99
June	9	3	6	0.333	29	33
First Half Total	57	36	21	0.632	237	170

===== Second half =====
Month	Games	Won	Lost	Win %	RS	RA
August	21	12	9	0.571	103	76
September	28	13	15	0.464	94	101
October	4	2	2	0.500	16	9
Second Half Total	53	27	26	0.509	213	186
Total	110	63	47	0.573	450	356

	Games	Won	Lost	Win %	RS	RA
Home	56	33	23	0.589	221	171
Road	54	30	24	0.556	229	185
Total	110	63	47	0.573	450	356

=== Composite Box ===
1981 Los Angeles Dodgers Inning–by–Inning Boxscore
Team	1	2	3	4	5	6	7	8	9	10	11	12	13	14	R	H	E
Opponents	39	31	46	49	32	29	66	44	33	7	4	1	1	0	356	904	0
Dodgers	48	53	29	61	47	47	48	38	37	11	4	3	0	1	450	984	0

=== Postseason Game log ===
1981 Postseason game log: 10–6 (Home: 7–1; Away: 3–5)
NL Western Division Series: vs. Houston Astros 3–2 (Home: 3–0; Away: 0–2)

#	Date	Time (PT)	Opponent	Score	Win	Loss	Save	Time of Game	Attendance	Series	Box Streak
1	October 6	5:15 p.m. PDT	@ Astros	1–3	Ryan (1–0)	**Stewart** (0–1)	—	2:22	44,836	HOU 1–0	L1
2	October 7	10:05 a.m. PDT	@ Astros	0–1 (11)	Sambito (1–0)	**Stewart** (0–2)	—	3:39	42,398	HOU 2–0	L2
3	October 9	1:05 p.m. PDT	Astros	6–1	**Hooton** (1–0)	Knepper (0–1)	—	2:35	46,820	HOU 2–1	W1
4	October 10	5:15 p.m. PDT	Astros	2–1	**Valenzuela** (1–0)	Ruhle (0–1)	—	2:00	55,983	TIE 2–2	W2
5	October 11	1:05 p.m. PDT	Astros	4–0	**Reuss** (1–0)	Ryan (1–1)	—	2:52	55,979	LAN 3–2	W3

NL Championship Series: vs. Montreal Expos 3–2 (Home: 1–1; Away: 2–1)

#	Date	Time (PT)	Opponent	Score	Win	Loss	Save	Time of Game	Attendance	Series	Box Streak
1	October 13	1:05 p.m. PDT	Expos	5–1	**Hooton** (1–0)	Gullickson (0–1)	—	2:47	51,273	LAN 1–0	W1
2	October 14	5:20 p.m. PDT	Expos	0–3	Burris (1–0)	**Valenzuela** (0–1)	—	2:48	53,463	TIE 1–1	L1
3	October 16	5:20 p.m. PDT	@ Expos	1–4	Rogers (1–0)	**Reuss** (0–1)	—	2:27	54,372	MTL 2–1	L2
4	October 17	10:05 a.m. PDT	@ Expos	7–1	**Hooton** (2–0)	Gullickson (0–2)	—	3:14	54,199	TIE 2–2	W1
—	October 18	1:05 p.m. PDT	@ Expos	Postponed (rain); Makeup: October 19							
5	October 19	10:05 a.m. PDT	@ Expos	2–1	**Valenzuela** (1–1)	Rogers (1–1)	**Welch** (1)	2:41	36,491	LAN 3–2	W2

World Series: vs. New York Yankees 4–2 (Home: 3–0; Away: 1–2)

#	Date	Time (PT)	Opponent	Score	Win	Loss	Save	Time of Game	Attendance	Series	Box Streak
1	October 20	5:30 p.m. PDT	@ Yankees	3–5	Guidry (1–0)	**Reuss** (0–1)	Gossage (1)	2:32	56,470	NYA 1–0	L1
2	October 21	5:20 p.m. PDT	@ Yankees	0–3	John (1–0)	**Hooton** (0–1)	Gossage (2)	2:29	56,505	NYA 2–0	L2
3	October 23	5:30 p.m. PDT	Yankees	5–4	**Valenzuela** (1–0)	Frazier (0–1)	—	3:04	56,236	NYA 2–1	W1
4	October 24	1:25 p.m. PDT	Yankees	8–7	**Howe** (1–0)	Frazier (0–2)	—	3:32	56,242	TIE 2–2	W2
5	October 25	1:45 p.m. PST	Yankees	2–1	**Reuss** (1–1)	Guidry (1–1)	—	2:19	56,115	LAN 3–2	W3
—	October 27	5:20 p.m. PST	@ Yankees	Postponed (rain); Makeup: October 28							
6	October 28	5:20 p.m. PST	@ Yankees	9–2	**Hooton** (1–1)	Frazier (0–3)	**Howe** (1)	3:09	56,513	LAN 4–2	W4

== Starting Lineups ==
=== Regular Season ===
==== Batting Order ====
1981 Regular Season Batting Order game log
April

#	Date	Opponent	1st	2nd	3rd	4th	5th	6th	7th	8th	9th
1	April 9	HOU									
2	April 11	HOU									
3	April 12	HOU									
10	April 20	@ HOU									
11	April 21	@ HOU									
12	April 22	@ HOU									

May

#	Date	Opponent	1st	2nd	3rd	4th	5th	6th	7th	8th	9th
20	May 1	@ MTL									
21	May 2	@ MTL									
22	May 3	@ MTL									
23	May 4	@ MTL									
30	May 12	MTL									
310	May 13	MTL									
32	May 14	MTL									

June

#	Date	Opponent	1st	2nd	3rd	4th	5th	6th	7th	8th	9th

August

#	Date	Opponent	1st	2nd	3rd	4th	5th	6th	7th	8th	9th

September

#	Date	Opponent	1st	2nd	3rd	4th	5th	6th	7th	8th	9th
101	September 25	@ HOU									
102	September 26	@ HOU									
103	September 27	@ HOU									

October

#	Date	Opponent	1st	2nd	3rd	4th	5th	6th	7th	8th	9th
108	October 2	HOU									
109	October 3	HOU									
110	October 4	HOU									

==== Defensive Lineup ====
1981 Regular Season Defensive Lineup game log
April

#	Date	Opponent	C	1B	2B	3B	SS	LF	CF	RF	P
1	April 9	HOU									
2	April 11	HOU									
3	April 12	HOU									
10	April 20	@ HOU									
11	April 21	@ HOU									
12	April 22	@ HOU									

May

#	Date	Opponent	C	1B	2B	3B	SS	LF	CF	RF	P
20	May 1	@ MTL									
21	May 2	@ MTL									
22	May 3	@ MTL									
23	May 4	@ MTL									
30	May 12	MTL									
310	May 13	MTL									
32	May 14	MTL									

June

#	Date	Opponent	C	1B	2B	3B	SS	LF	CF	RF	P

August

#	Date	Opponent	C	1B	2B	3B	SS	LF	CF	RF	P

September

#	Date	Opponent	C	1B	2B	3B	SS	LF	CF	RF	P
101	September 25	@ HOU									
102	September 26	@ HOU									
103	September 27	@ HOU									

October

#	Date	Opponent	C	1B	2B	3B	SS	LF	CF	RF	P
108	October 2	HOU									
109	October 3	HOU									
110	October 4	HOU									

=== Postseason ===
==== Batting Order ====
1981 Postseason Batting Order game log
NL Western Division Series: vs. Houston Astros

#	Date	Opponent	1st	2nd	3rd	4th	5th	6th	7th	8th	9th
1	October 6	@ HOU									
2	October 7	@ HOU									
3	October 9	HOU									
4	October 10	HOU									
5	October 11	HOU									

NL Championship Series: vs. Montreal Expos

#	Date	Opponent	1st	2nd	3rd	4th	5th	6th	7th	8th	9th
1	October 13	MTL									
2	October 14	MTL									
3	October 16	@ MTL									
4	October 17	@ MTL									
5	October 19	@ MTL									

World Series: vs. New York Yankees

#	Date	Opponent	1st	2nd	3rd	4th	5th	6th	7th	8th	9th
1	October 20	@ NYY									
2	October 21	@ NYY									
3	October 23	NYY									
4	October 24	NYY									
5	October 25	NYY									
6	October 28	@ NYY									

==== Defensive Lineup ====
1981 Postseason Defensive Lineup game log
NL Western Division Series: vs. Houston Astros

#	Date	Opponent	C	1B	2B	3B	SS	LF	CF	RF	P
1	October 6	@ HOU									
2	October 7	@ HOU									
3	October 9	HOU									
4	October 10	HOU									
5	October 11	HOU									

NL Championship Series: vs. Montreal Expos

#	Date	Opponent	C	1B	2B	3B	SS	LF	CF	RF	P
1	October 13	MTL									
2	October 14	MTL									
3	October 16	@ MTL									
4	October 17	@ MTL									
5	October 19	@ MTL									

World Series: vs. New York Yankees

#	Date	Opponent	C	1B	2B	3B	SS	LF	CF	RF	P
1	October 20	@ NYY									
2	October 21	@ NYY									
3	October 23	NYY									
4	October 24	NYY									
5	October 25	NYY									
6	October 28	@ NYY									

== Game Umpires ==
=== Regular Season ===
1981 Regular Season Umpire game log
April

#	Date	Opponent	HP	1B	2B	3B
1	April 9	HOU	#5; Bob Engel (crew chief)	#3; Jerry Dale	#17; Paul Runge	#15; Jim Quick
2	April 11	HOU	#3; Jerry Dale	#17; Paul Runge	#15; Jim Quick	#5; Bob Engel (crew chief)
3	April 12	HOU	#17; Paul Runge	#15; Jim Quick	#5; Bob Engel (crew chief)	#3; Jerry Dale
10	April 20	@ HOU	#20; Ed Vargo (crew chief)	#4; Satch Davidson	#19; Terry Tata	#2; Jerry Crawford
11	April 21	@ HOU	#4; Satch Davidson	#19; Terry Tata	#2; Jerry Crawford	#20; Ed Vargo (crew chief)
12	April 22	@ HOU	#19; Terry Tata	#2; Jerry Crawford	#20; Ed Vargo (crew chief)	#4; Satch Davidson

May

#	Date	Opponent	HP	1B	2B	3B
20	May 1	@ MTL	#10; John McSherry	#28; Fred Brocklander	#25; Charlie Williams	#13; Paul Pryor (crew chief)
21	May 2	@ MTL	#28; Fred Brocklander	#25; Charlie Williams	#13; Paul Pryor (crew chief)	#10; John McSherry
22	May 3	@ MTL	#25; Charlie Williams	#13; Paul Pryor (crew chief)	#10; John McSherry	#28; Fred Brocklander
23	May 4	@ MTL	#13; Paul Pryor (crew chief)	#10; John McSherry	#28; Fred Brocklander	#25; Charlie Williams
30	May 12	MTL	#16; Dutch Rennert	#11; Ed Montague	#23; Lee Weyer (crew chief)	#21; Harry Wendelstedt
310	May 13	MTL	#11; Ed Montague	#23; Lee Weyer (crew chief)	#21; Harry Wendelstedt	#16; Dutch Rennert
32	May 14	MTL	#23; Lee Weyer (crew chief)	#21; Harry Wendelstedt	#16; Dutch Rennert	#11; Ed Montague

June

#	Date	Opponent	HP	1B	2B	3B

August

#	Date	Opponent	HP	1B	2B	3B

September

#	Date	Opponent	HP	1B	2B	3B
101	September 25	@ HOU	#9; John Kibler (crew chief)	#6; Bruce Froemming	#22; Joe West	#18; Dick Stello
102	September 26	@ HOU	#6; Bruce Froemming	#22; Joe West	#18; Dick Stello	#9; John Kibler (crew chief)
103	September 27	@ HOU	#22; Joe West	#18; Dick Stello	#9; John Kibler (crew chief)	#6; Bruce Froemming

October

#	Date	Opponent	HP	1B	2B	3B
108	October 2	HOU	#17; Paul Runge	#15; Jim Quick	#5; Bob Engel (crew chief)	#3; Jerry Dale
109	October 3	HOU	#15; Jim Quick	#5; Bob Engel (crew chief)	#3; Jerry Dale	#17; Paul Runge
110	October 4	HOU	#15; Jim Quick	#5; Bob Engel (crew chief)	#3; Jerry Dale	#17; Paul Runge

=== Postseason ===
1981 Postseason Umpire game log
NL Western Division Series: vs. Houston Astros

#	Date	Opponent	HP	1B	2B	3B	LF	RF
1	October 6	@ HOU	#3; Jerry Dale	#15; Jim Quick	#4; Satch Davidson	#10; John McSherry	#23; Lee Weyer (crew chief)	#11; Ed Montague
2	October 7	@ HOU	#15; Jim Quick	#4; Satch Davidson	#10; John McSherry	#23; Lee Weyer (crew chief)	#11; Ed Montague	#3; Jerry Dale
3	October 9	HOU	#4; Satch Davidson	#10; John McSherry	#23; Lee Weyer (crew chief)	#11; Ed Montague	#3; Jerry Dale	#15; Jim Quick
4	October 10	HOU	#10; John McSherry	#23; Lee Weyer (crew chief)	#11; Ed Montague	#3; Jerry Dale	#15; Jim Quick	#4; Satch Davidson
5	October 11	HOU	#23; Lee Weyer (crew chief)	#11; Ed Montague	#3; Jerry Dale	#15; Jim Quick	#4; Satch Davidson	#10; John McSherry

NL Championship Series: vs. Montreal Expos

#	Date	Opponent	HP	1B	2B	3B	LF	RF
1	October 13	MTL	#13; Paul Pryor	#7; Eric Gregg	#17; Paul Runge	#16; Dutch Rennert	#21; Harry Wendelstedt (crew chief)	#22; Joe West
2	October 14	MTL	#7; Eric Gregg	#17; Paul Runge	#16; Dutch Rennert	#21; Harry Wendelstedt (crew chief)	#22; Joe West	#13; Paul Pryor
3	October 16	@ MTL	#17; Paul Runge	#16; Dutch Rennert	#21; Harry Wendelstedt (crew chief)	#22; Joe West	#13; Paul Pryor	#7; Eric Gregg
4	October 17	@ MTL	#16; Dutch Rennert	#21; Harry Wendelstedt (crew chief)	#22; Joe West	#13; Paul Pryor	#7; Eric Gregg	#17; Paul Runge
5	October 19	@ MTL	#21; Harry Wendelstedt (crew chief)	#22; Joe West	#13; Paul Pryor	#7; Eric Gregg	#17; Paul Runge	#16; Dutch Rennert

World Series: vs. New York Yankees

#	Date	Opponent	HP	1B	2B	3B	LF	RF
1	October 20	@ NYY	#22; Larry Barnett (AL) (crew chief)	#1; Nick Colosi (NL)	#12; Terry Cooney (AL)	#8; Dave Harvey (NL)	#19; Rich Garcia (AL)	#18; Dick Stello (NL)
2	October 21	@ NYY	#1; Nick Colosi (NL)	#12; Terry Cooney (AL)	#8; Dave Harvey (NL)	#19; Rich Garcia (AL)	#18; Dick Stello (NL)	#22; Larry Barnett (AL) (crew chief)
3	October 23	NYY	#12; Terry Cooney (AL)	#8; Dave Harvey (NL)	#19; Rich Garcia (AL)	#18; Dick Stello (NL)	#22; Larry Barnett (AL) (crew chief)	#1; Nick Colosi (NL)
4	October 24	NYY	#8; Dave Harvey (NL)	#19; Rich Garcia (AL)	#18; Dick Stello (NL)	#22; Larry Barnett (AL) (crew chief)	#1; Nick Colosi (NL)	#12; Terry Cooney (AL)
5	October 25	NYY	#19; Rich Garcia (AL)	#18; Dick Stello (NL)	#22; Larry Barnett (AL) (crew chief)	#1; Nick Colosi (NL)	#12; Terry Cooney (AL)	#8; Dave Harvey (NL)
6	October 28	@ NYY	#18; Dick Stello (NL)	#22; Larry Barnett (AL) (crew chief)	#1; Nick Colosi (NL)	#12; Terry Cooney (AL)	#8; Dave Harvey (NL)	#19; Rich Garcia (AL)

== Starting pitchers stats ==
= Indicates league leader

Note: G = Games pitched; GS = Games started; IP = Innings pitched; ERA = Earned run average; W/L = Wins/Losses; BB = Walks allowed; SO = Strikeouts; CG = Complete games

Name	G	GS	IP	ERA	W/L	BB	SO	CG
Fernando Valenzuela	25	25	192.1	2.48	13-7	61	180	11
Burt Hooton	23	23	142.1	2.28	11-6	33	74	5
Bob Welch	23	23	141.1	3.44	9-5	41	88	2
Jerry Reuss	22	22	152.2	2.30	10-4	27	51	8

== Relief pitchers stats ==
Note: G = Games pitched; GS = Games started; IP = Innings pitched; ERA = Earned run average; W/L = Wins/Losses; BB = Walks allowed; SO = Strikeouts; SV = Saves

Name	G	GS	IP	ERA	W/L	BB	SO	SV
Steve Howe	41	0	54.0	2.50	5-3	18	32	8
Bobby Castillo	34	1	50.2	5.33	2-4	18	32	5
Dave Stewart	32	0	43.1	2.49	4-3	14	29	6
Terry Forster	21	0	30.2	4.11	0-1	15	17	0
Dave Goltz	26	8	77.0	4.09	2-7	25	48	1
Rick Sutcliffe	14	6	47.0	4.02	2-2	20	16	0
Tom Niedenfuer	17	0	26.0	3.81	3-1	6	12	2
Alejandro Peña	14	0	25.1	2.84	1-1	11	14	2
Ted Power	5	2	14.1	3.14	1-3	7	7	0

== Batting stats ==
Note: Pos = Position; G = Games played; AB = At bats; Avg. = Batting average; R = Runs scored; H = Hits; HR = Home runs; RBI = Runs batted in; SB = Stolen bases

Player	Pos	GP	AB	Avg.	R	H	HR	RBI	SB
Mike Scioscia	C	93	290	.276	27	80	2	29	0
Steve Yeager	C	42	86	.209	5	18	3	7	0
Jerry Grote	C	2	2	.000	0	0	0	0	0
Steve Garvey	1B	110*	431	.283	63	122	10	64	3
Davey Lopes	2B	58	214	.289	35	44	5	17	20
Bill Russell	SS	82	262	.233	20	61	0	22	2
Ron Cey	3B	85	312	.288	42	90	13	50	0
Derrel Thomas	2B/3B/SS/OF	80	218	.248	25	54	4	24	7
Steve Sax	2B	31	119	.277	15	33	2	9	5
Pepe Frías	SS/2B/3B	25	36	.250	6	9	0	3	0
Reggie Smith	1B	41	35	.200	5	7	1	8	0
Mike Marshall	1B/3B/OF	14	25	.200	2	5	0	1	0
Gary Weiss	SS	14	19	.105	2	2	0	1	0
Jack Perconte	2B	8	9	.222	2	2	0	1	1
Dusty Baker	OF	103	400	.320	48	128	9	49	10
Pedro Guerrero	OF/3B/1B	98	347	.300	46	104	12	48	5
Ken Landreaux	OF	99	390	.251	48	98	7	41	18
Rick Monday	OF	66	130	.315	24	41	11	25	1
Jay Johnstone	OF/1B	61	83	.205	8	17	3	6	0
Ron Roenicke	OF	22	47	.234	6	11	0	0	1
Joe Ferguson	OF	17	14	.143	2	2	0	1	0
Candy Maldonado	OF	11	12	.093	0	1	0	0	0
Bobby Mitchell	OF	10	5	.125	0	1	0	0	0
Mark Bradley	OF	9	6	.167	2	1	0	0	0

- Tied with Ozzie Smith (San Diego)

== Postseason ==
=== 1981 National League Division Series ===
In the divisional series, the Dodgers fell behind the Houston Astros two games to zero but came back to win the next three games to take the series and advance to the LCS.

==== Game 1 ====
October 6, The Astrodome, Houston, Texas

Team	1	2	3	4	5	6	7	8	9	R	H	E
Los Angeles	0	0	0	0	1	0	0	0	0	1	2	0
Houston	0	0	0	1	0	0	0	0	2	3	8	0
W: Nolan Ryan (1-0) L: Dave Stewart (0-1)
HRs: LA – Steve Garvey (1) HOU – Alan Ashby (1)

==== Game 2 ====
October 7, The Astrodome, Houston, Texas

Team	1	2	3	4	5	6	7	8	9	10	11	R	H	E
Los Angeles	0	0	0	0	0	0	0	0	0	0	0	0	9	1
Houston	0	0	0	0	0	0	0	0	0	0	1	1	9	0
W: Joe Sambito (1-0) L: Dave Stewart (0-2)
HRs: LA – none HOU – none

==== Game 3 ====
October 9, Dodger Stadium, Los Angeles

Team	1	2	3	4	5	6	7	8	9	R	H	E
Houston	0	0	1	0	0	0	0	0	0	1	3	2
Los Angeles	3	0	0	0	0	3	0	0	X	6	10	0
W: Burt Hooton (1-0) L: Bob Knepper (0-1)
HRs: HOU – Art Howe (1) LA – Steve Garvey (2)

==== Game 4 ====
October 10, Dodger Stadium, Los Angeles

Team	1	2	3	4	5	6	7	8	9	R	H	E
Houston	0	0	0	0	0	0	0	0	1	1	4	0
Los Angeles	0	0	0	0	1	0	1	0	X	2	4	0
W: Fernando Valenzuela (1-0) L: Vern Ruhle (0-1)
HRs: HOU – none LA – Pedro Guerrero (1)

==== Game 5 ====
October 11, Dodger Stadium, Los Angeles

Team	1	2	3	4	5	6	7	8	9	R	H	E
Houston	0	0	0	0	0	0	0	0	0	0	5	3
Los Angeles	0	0	0	0	0	3	1	0	X	4	7	2
W: Jerry Reuss (1-0) L: Nolan Ryan (1-1)
HRs: HOU – none LA – none

=== 1981 National League Championship Series ===
The Dodgers faced the Montreal Expos in the 1981 NLCS and beat them three games to two, thanks to a ninth-inning home run by Rick Monday in Game 5.

==== Game 1 ====
October 13, Dodger Stadium, Los Angeles

Team	1	2	3	4	5	6	7	8	9	R	H	E
Montreal	0	0	0	0	0	0	0	0	1	1	9	0
Los Angeles	0	2	0	0	0	0	0	3	X	5	8	0
W: Burt Hooton (1-0) L: Bill Gullickson (0-1)
HRs: MON – None LAD – Pedro Guerrero (1), Mike Scioscia (1)
Pitchers: MON – Gullickson, Reardon (8) LAD – Hooton, Welch (8), Howe (9)
Attendance: 51,273

==== Game 2 ====
October 14, Dodger Stadium, Los Angeles

Team	1	2	3	4	5	6	7	8	9	R	H	E
Montreal	0	2	0	0	0	1	0	0	0	3	10	1
Los Angeles	0	0	0	0	0	0	0	0	0	0	5	1
W: Ray Burris (1-0) L: Fernando Valenzuela (0-1)
HRs: MON – None LAD – None
Pitchers: MON – Burris LAD – Valenzuela, Niedenfuer (7), Forster (7), Pena (7), Castillo (9)
Attendance: 53,463

==== Game 3 ====
October 16, Olympic Stadium, Montreal, Quebec

Team	1	2	3	4	5	6	7	8	9	R	H	E
Los Angeles	0	0	0	1	0	0	0	0	0	1	7	0
Montreal	0	0	0	0	0	4	0	0	X	4	7	1
W: Steve Rogers (1-0) L: Jerry Reuss (0-1)
HRs: LAD – None MON – Jerry White (1)
Pitchers: LAD – Reuss, Pena (8) MON – Rogers
Attendance: 54,372

==== Game 4 ====
October 17, Olympic Stadium, Montreal, Quebec

Team	1	2	3	4	5	6	7	8	9	R	H	E
Los Angeles	0	0	1	0	0	0	0	2	4	7	12	1
Montreal	0	0	0	1	0	0	0	0	0	1	5	1
W: Burt Hooton (2-0) L: Bill Gullickson (0-2)
HRs: LAD – Steve Garvey (1) MON – None
Pitchers: LAD – Hooton, Welch (8), Howe (9) MON – Gullickson, Fryman (8), Sosa (9), Lee (9)
Attendance: 54,499

==== Game 5 ====
October 19, Olympic Stadium, Montreal, Quebec

Team	1	2	3	4	5	6	7	8	9	R	H	E
Los Angeles	0	0	0	0	1	0	0	0	1	2	6	0
Montreal	1	0	0	0	0	0	0	0	0	1	3	1
W: Fernando Valenzuela (1-1) L: Steve Rogers (1-1) SV: Bob Welch (1)
HRs: LAD – Rick Monday (1) MON – None
Pitchers: LAD – Valenzuela, Welch (9) MON – Burris, Rogers (9)
Attendance: 36,491

== 1981 World Series ==
The Dodgers met the New York Yankees in the World Series once again, this time beating them in six games to claim their first championship since 1965.

=== Game 1 ===
October 20, Yankee Stadium, New York

Team	1	2	3	4	5	6	7	8	9	R	H	E
Los Angeles	0	0	0	0	1	0	0	2	0	3	5	0
New York	3	0	1	1	0	0	0	0	X	5	6	0
W: Ron Guidry (1-0) L: Jerry Reuss (0-1) SV: Goose Gossage (1)
HRs: LAD – Steve Yeager (1) NY – Bob Watson (1)

=== Game 2 ===
October 21, Yankee Stadium, New York

Team	1	2	3	4	5	6	7	8	9	R	H	E
Los Angeles	0	0	0	0	0	0	0	0	0	0	4	2
New York	0	0	0	0	1	0	0	2	X	3	6	1
W: Tommy John (1-0) L: Burt Hooton (0-1) SV: Goose Gossage (2)
HRs: LAD – none NY – none

=== Game 3 ===
October 23, Dodger Stadium, Los Angeles

Team	1	2	3	4	5	6	7	8	9	R	H	E
New York	0	2	2	0	0	0	0	0	0	4	9	0
Los Angeles	3	0	0	0	2	0	0	0	X	5	11	1
W: Fernando Valenzuela (1-0) L: George Frazier (0-1) SV: none)
HRs: NY – Rick Cerone (1), Bob Watson (2) LA – Ron Cey (1)

=== Game 4 ===
October 24, Dodger Stadium, Los Angeles

Team	1	2	3	4	5	6	7	8	9	R	H	E
New York	2	1	1	0	0	2	0	1	0	7	13	1
Los Angeles	0	0	2	0	1	3	2	0	X	8	14	2
W: Steve Howe (1-0) L: George Frazier (0-2) SV: none)
HRs: NY – Willie Randolph (1), Reggie Jackson (1) LA – Jay Johnstone (1)

=== Game 5 ===
October 25, Dodger Stadium, Los Angeles

Team	1	2	3	4	5	6	7	8	9	R	H	E
New York	0	1	0	0	0	0	0	0	0	1	5	0
Los Angeles	0	0	0	0	0	2	0	0	X	2	4	3
W: Jerry Reuss (1-1) L: Ron Guidry (1-1) SV: none
HRs: NY – none LA – Pedro Guerrero (1), Steve Yeager (2)

=== Game 6 ===
October 28, Yankee Stadium, New York

Team	1	2	3	4	5	6	7	8	9	R	H	E
Los Angeles	0	0	0	1	3	4	0	1	0	9	13	1
New York	0	0	1	0	0	1	0	0	0	2	7	2
W: Burt Hooton (1-1) L: George Frazier (0-3) SV: Steve Howe (1)
HRs: LAD – Pedro Guerrero (2) NY – Willie Randolph (2)

== 1981 awards ==
- 1981 Major League Baseball All-Star Game
  - Fernando Valenzuela starter
  - Davey Lopes starter
  - Dusty Baker reserve
  - Steve Garvey reserve
  - Pedro Guerrero reserve
  - Burt Hooton reserve
- National League Rookie of the Year
  - Fernando Valenzuela
- National League Cy Young Award
  - Fernando Valenzuela
- NLCS Most Valuable Player
  - Burt Hooton
- World Series Most Valuable Player
  - Ron Cey
  - Pedro Guerrero
  - Steve Yeager
- Gold Glove Award
  - Dusty Baker
- Roberto Clemente Award
  - Steve Garvey
- Baseball Digest Rookie All-Star
  - Dave Stewart
  - Fernando Valenzuela
- TSN Rookie Pitcher of the Year Award
  - Fernando Valenzuela
- TSN Pitcher of the Year Award
  - Fernando Valenzuela
- Silver Slugger Award
  - Fernando Valenzuela
  - Dusty Baker
- TSN Major League Player of the Year Award
  - Fernando Valenzuela
- TSN National League All-Star
  - Fernando Valenzuela
  - Pedro Guerrero
- NL Pitcher of the Month
  - Fernando Valenzuela (April 1981)
- NL Player of the Week
  - Fernando Valenzuela (Apr. 6–12)
  - Ron Cey (May 11–17)
  - Fernando Valenzuela (Aug. 31 – Sep. 6)

== Farm system ==
Level	Team	League	Manager
**AAA**	**Albuquerque Dukes**	**Pacific Coast League**	**Del Crandall**
AA	San Antonio Dodgers	Texas League	Don LeJohn
**High A**	**Lodi Dodgers**	**California League**	**Terry Collins**
High A	Vero Beach Dodgers	Florida State League	Stan Wasiak
Rookie	Lethbridge Dodgers	Pioneer League	Gary LaRocque

Teams in BOLD won League Championships

== Major League Baseball draft ==
The Dodgers drafted 33 players in the June draft and 18 in the January draft. Of those, eight players would eventually play in the Major Leagues. They received an extra pick in the 2nd round from the Houston Astros as compensation for the loss of free agent pitcher Don Sutton.

The Dodgers first round pick in the June draft was shortstop Dave Anderson from the University of Memphis. He played 10 seasons in the Majors (8 of them with the Dodgers), primarily as a utility infielder. The draft also included pitchers Sid Fernandez (round 3) and John Franco (round 5), both of whom would have lengthy Major League careers primarily with the New York Mets after the Dodgers traded them.

1981 draft picks

=== January draft ===
Round	Name	Position	School	Signed	Career span	Highest level
1	Kelvin White	RHP	Cosumnes River College	No		
2	Robert Seymour	OF	Sacramento City College	Yes	1981–1982	A
3	Frederick Bass	3B	Sacramento City College	Yes	1981	A
4	John Sylvia	SS	College of the Sequoias	Yes	1981–1982	A
5	Jack Loop	1B	Pasadena City College	No		
6	Eugene Steinbach	C	Georgia Perimeter College	Yes	1981–1994	AA
7	Brad Harlow	SS	Cosumnes River College	No		
8	Brett Radland	RHP	Valencia Community College	No		
9	Jon Van Dort	OF	Chaffey College	No		
10	Larry Riddle	RHP	Alvin Community College	No; Red Sox-1984	1984	A
11	Andy Hargrove	RHP	Barstow Community College	No		
12	James Sewell	OF	Sacramento City College	No		
13	Ronnie Chapman	2B	Louisburg College	No; Blue Jays-1982	1982–1986	AA
14	James Woods	IF	San Jacinto College	No		
15	Charles Byers	3B	Chaffey College	No		
16	Benny Distefano	1B	Alvin Community College	No; Pirates-1982	1982–1993	**MLB**

==== January secondary phase ====
Round	Name	Position	School	Signed	Career span	Highest level
1	Shayne Hammond	LHP	Southeastern Illinois College	Yes	1981–1983	AA
2	Tom DiCeglio	SS	Gulf Coast Community College	No; Twins-1984	1984–1986	A

=== June draft ===
Round	Name	Position	School	Signed	Career span	Highest level
1	Dave Anderson	SS	University of Memphis	Yes	1981–1992	**MLB**
2	Sid Bream	1B	Liberty University	Yes	1981–1994	**MLB**
2	Lemmie Miller	OF	Arizona State University	Yes	1981–1989	**MLB**
3	Sid Fernandez	LHP	Kaiser High School	No; Angels-1984	1981–2001	**MLB**
4	Steven Boncore	C	University of La Verne	Yes	1981–1983	A
5	John Franco	LHP	St. John's University	Yes	1981–2005	**MLB**
6	Brian Williams	OF	South High School	Yes	1981–1986	A
7	Michael Beuder	LHP	Santa Clara University	Yes	1981–1983	A
8	Gregory Chinn	OF	California State University, Sacramento	Yes	1981–1983	A
9	Stu Pederson	OF	University of Southern California	Yes	1981–1992	**MLB**
10	Mark Pirruccello	C	California State University, Fullerton	No; Royals-1982	1982–1984	AA
11	Gregory Carne	RHP	Redondo High School	Yes	1981–1984	A
12	Peyton Mosher	RHP	University of Georgia	Yes	1981–1984	A
13	David Anderson	RHP	University of Nevada, Reno	Yes	1982–1990	AAA
14	Dean Rennicke	RHP	University of Wisconsin–Madison	Yes	1981–1985	AAA
15	Jimmy Guillen	RHP	Roosevelt High School	No		
16	Harold Perkins	SS	California State University, Los Angeles	Yes	1981–1991	AAA
17	Christopher Chavez	SS	University of Nebraska at Lincoln	Yes	1981–1982	AA
18	Jerry Bendorf	SS	Gonzaga University	Yes	1981–1982	AA
19	Jeffrey Greene	SS	University of Vermont	Yes	1981	Rookie
20	Tim Criswell	RHP	Carrollton High School	No; Dodgers-1983	1983–1987	AA
21	John Gregory	1B	Lake Worth High School	Yes	1981–1984	A
22	Craig Thompson	OF	Dallas Baptist University	Yes	1981–1982	A
23	William Murray	2B	University of San Francisco	Yes	1981	A
24	Steven Young	OF	Chambersburg High School	Yes	1981	Rookie
25	Robert Philps	RHP	Carmichaels High School	No		
26	Charles Beard	RHP	California State University, Sacramento	Yes	1981–1983	A
27	David Dunlap	IF	California State University, Sacramento	No		
28	Brett Davis	OF	Pearland High School	No		
29	Jeff Carter	IF	Evanston Township High School	No; Giants-1985	1985–1996	AAA
30	Ronald Robbins	RHP	Louisiana State University at Alexandria	No; Blue Jays-1983	1983–1984	A

==== June secondary phase ====
Round	Name	Position	School	Signed	Career span	Highest level
1	Ralph Bryant	OF	Abraham Baldwin Agricultural College	Yes	1981–1996	**MLB**
2	Michael Moore	C	Edmonds Community College	Yes	1981–1982	A
3	Ethan McHenry	RHP	Yakima Valley Community College	No		
