= 1981 National League Division Series =

American baseball games

Teams
Team (Wins)		Manager	Season
Los Angeles Dodgers (3)		Tommy Lasorda	36–21, .632, GA: ½ (1st half); 27–26, .509, GB: 6 (2nd half)
Houston Astros (2)		Bill Virdon	28–29, .491, GB: 8 (1st half); 33–20, .623, GA: 1½ (2nd half)
- Dates: October 6 – 11
- Television: NBC; KTTV (LAD); KRIV-TV (HOU)
- TV announcers: NBC: Joe Garagiola and Tony Kubek; KTTV: Vin Scully, Jerry Doggett, and Ross Porter; KRIV-TV: Gene Elston, Dewayne Staats, and Larry Dierker
- Radio: CBS; KABC-AM (LAD); KENR (HOU)
- Radio announcers: CBS: Jerry Coleman and Sparky Anderson; KABC: Vin Scully, Jerry Doggett, and Ross Porter; KENR: Gene Elston, Dewayne Staats, and Larry Dierker
- Umpires: Jerry Dale; Jim Quick; Satch Davidson; John McSherry; Lee Weyer; Ed Montague

Teams
Team (Wins)		Manager	Season
Montreal Expos (3)		Jim Fanning	30–25, .545, GB: 4 (1st half); 30–23, .566, GA: ½ (2nd half)
Philadelphia Phillies (2)		Dallas Green	34–21, .618, GA: 1½ (1st half); 25–27, .481, GB: 4½ (2nd half)
- Dates: October 7 – 11
- Television: NBC; CBC (MON – English); SRC (MON – French); WPHL-TV (PHI)
- TV announcers: NBC Dick Enberg and Tom Seaver; CBC: Dave Van Horne and Duke Snider; SRC: Jean-Pierre Roy and Guy Ferron; WPHL-TV: Harry Kalas, Andy Musser, Richie Ashburn and Tim McCarver
- Radio: CBS
- Radio announcers: Jack Buck and Joe Torre
- Umpires: Terry Tata; Frank Pulli; Bruce Froemming; Billy Williams; John Kibler; Jerry Crawford

The 1981 National League Division Series (NLDS), the opening round of the National League playoffs of the 1981 MLB Postseason which began on Tuesday, October 6, and ended on Sunday, October 11. The Division Series was created on August 6 in response to the 1981 Major League Baseball strike, which caused the cancellation of roughly one-third of the regular season between June 12 and August 9; by the time play was resumed, it was decided that the best approach was to have the first-half leaders automatically qualify for postseason play, and allow all the teams to begin the second half with a clean slate. The series were best-of-five games.

The Montreal Expos defeated the Philadelphia Phillies while the Los Angeles Dodgers defeated the Houston Astros to advance to the National League Championship Series.

== Overview ==
The first half and second-half champions in both the National League East and National League West divisions played each other in best-of-five series, with the winners advancing to the NL Championship Series (NLCS). If the same team had won both halves, a wild card team – the second-place team from both halves combined – would qualify for the postseason, but this proved unnecessary in both leagues. There were no plans to continue the format in later seasons, although the Division Series returned in 1995 on a permanent basis after MLB realigned to three divisions in each league. The teams in the 1981 NLDS were:

- East Division: Philadelphia Phillies (first-half champion, 34–21) vs. Montreal Expos (second-half champion, 30–23): Expos win series, 3–2.
- West Division: Los Angeles Dodgers (first-half champion, 36–21) vs. Houston Astros (second-half champion, 33–20): Dodgers win series, 3–2.

The second-half champions played the first two games at home, with the first-half champions hosting all remaining games; this was predetermined in August, independent of team records. Had a team won both halves of the season, they would have hosted all games of the series other than the first game, which the wild card team would host.

The results of the format were highly controversial, as the Cincinnati Reds failed to qualify for the postseason despite having the best record in baseball (66–42) over the full season; the St. Louis Cardinals, with the NL's second-best record (59–43), were also left out. The Reds had finished the first half of the season just a half-game behind the Dodgers, while the Cardinals finished the second half just a half-game behind the Expos, who were making their first postseason appearance after 13 years of play.

Both series went the full five games. The home team won every game in both series save for one: Game 5 of the East Division series, which Montreal won 3–0 at Philadelphia's Veterans Stadium. The Dodgers and Expos went on to meet in the NL Championship Series. The Dodgers became the National League champion, and defeated the American League champion New York Yankees in the 1981 World Series.

== Matchups ==
=== Los Angeles Dodgers vs. Houston Astros ===
Los Angeles won the series, 3–2.

Game	Date	Score	Location	Time	Attendance
1	October 6	Los Angeles Dodgers – 1, Houston Astros – 3	Astrodome	2:22	44,836
2	October 7	Los Angeles Dodgers – 0, Houston Astros – 1 (11 innings)	Astrodome	3:39	42,398
3	October 9	Houston Astros – 1, Los Angeles Dodgers – 6	Dodger Stadium	2:35	46,820
4	October 10	Houston Astros – 1, Los Angeles Dodgers – 2	Dodger Stadium	2:00	55,983
5	October 11	Houston Astros – 0, Los Angeles Dodgers – 4	Dodger Stadium	2:52	55,979

=== Philadelphia Phillies vs. Montreal Expos ===
Montreal won the series, 3–2.

Game	Date	Score	Location	Time	Attendance
1	October 7	Philadelphia Phillies – 1, Montreal Expos – 3	Olympic Stadium	2:30	34,237
2	October 8	Philadelphia Phillies – 1, Montreal Expos – 3	Olympic Stadium	2:31	45,896
3	October 9	Montreal Expos – 2, Philadelphia Phillies – 6	Veterans Stadium	2:45	36,835
4	October 10	Montreal Expos – 5, Philadelphia Phillies – 6 (10 innings)	Veterans Stadium	2:48	38,818
5	October 11	Montreal Expos – 3, Philadelphia Phillies – 0	Veterans Stadium	2:15	47,384

== Los Angeles vs. Houston ==
=== Game 1 ===
Tuesday, October 6, 1981 7:15 pm (CT) at Astrodome in Houston, Texas 73 °F (23 °C), dome
Team	1	2	3	4	5	6	7	8	9	R	H	E
Los Angeles	0	0	0	0	0	0	1	0	0	1	2	0
Houston	0	0	0	0	0	1	0	0	2	3	8	0
WP: Nolan Ryan (1–0) LP: Dave Stewart (0–1); Home runs: LAD: Steve Garvey (1); HOU: Alan Ashby (1); Attendance: 44,836; Boxscore

Fernando Valenzuela faced Nolan Ryan, a matchup worthy of a pitcher's duel. The game remained scoreless until the bottom of the sixth. Tony Scott singled home Terry Puhl to score the game's first run, but Steve Garvey tied the game with a home run in the top of the seventh. The score was still 1–1 in the bottom of the ninth. Dave Stewart retired the first two men, but Craig Reynolds singled and Alan Ashby slugged a two-run walk-off home run. It was the first postseason walkoff home run in Astros history.

=== Game 2 ===
Wednesday, October 7, 1981 12:05 pm (CT) at Astrodome in Houston, Texas 73 °F (23 °C), dome
Team	1	2	3	4	5	6	7	8	9	10	11	R	H	E
Los Angeles	0	0	0	0	0	0	0	0	0	0	0	0	9	1
Houston	0	0	0	0	0	0	0	0	0	0	1	1	9	0
WP: Joe Sambito (1–0) LP: Dave Stewart (0–2); Home runs: LAD: none HOU: none Attendance: 42,398; Boxscore

Jerry Reuss was pitted against Joe Niekro. Both pitchers kept the game scoreless, but both teams had trouble scoring runs when they managed to get men on. Reuss pitched nine innings and Niekro eight. It remained scoreless until the bottom of the 11th. Dave Stewart was brought in once again, although having lost the last game. He surrendered back-to-back singles to open the inning. He was taken out and the bases were loaded thanks to an intentional walk to César Cedeño. The bullpen had managed to get two outs but pinch hitter Denny Walling hit the game winner, a single to right field.

=== Game 3 ===
Friday, October 9 1:05 pm (PT) at Dodger Stadium in Los Angeles, California 71 °F (22 °C), Mostly Cloudy
Team	1	2	3	4	5	6	7	8	9	R	H	E
Houston	0	0	1	0	0	0	0	0	0	1	3	2
Los Angeles	3	0	0	0	0	0	0	3	X	6	10	0
WP: Burt Hooton (1–0) LP: Bob Knepper (0–1); Home runs: HOU: Art Howe (1); LAD: Steve Garvey (2); Attendance: 46,820; Boxscore

Houston was now one win away from winning their first postseason series and moving one step closer to the franchise's first pennant. However, Burt Hooton was there to stop the streaking Astros against Bob Knepper. Hooton held the Astros to three hits over seven innings and the bullpen held them to no hits through the last two innings. After an RBI double by Dusty Baker, Steve Garvey hit a two-run homer to make it 3–0 in the bottom of the first. Art Howe would drive the only run of the game for the Astros by hitting a leadoff home run in the third. The Dodgers would add insurance in the eighth. With two on and one out off of Joe Sambito, Bill Russell's RBI single, Reggie Smith's sacrifice fly, and Ken Landreaux's RBI single extended their lead to 6–1. Bob Welch pitched a scoreless ninth to keep the Dodgers in the series.

=== Game 4 ===
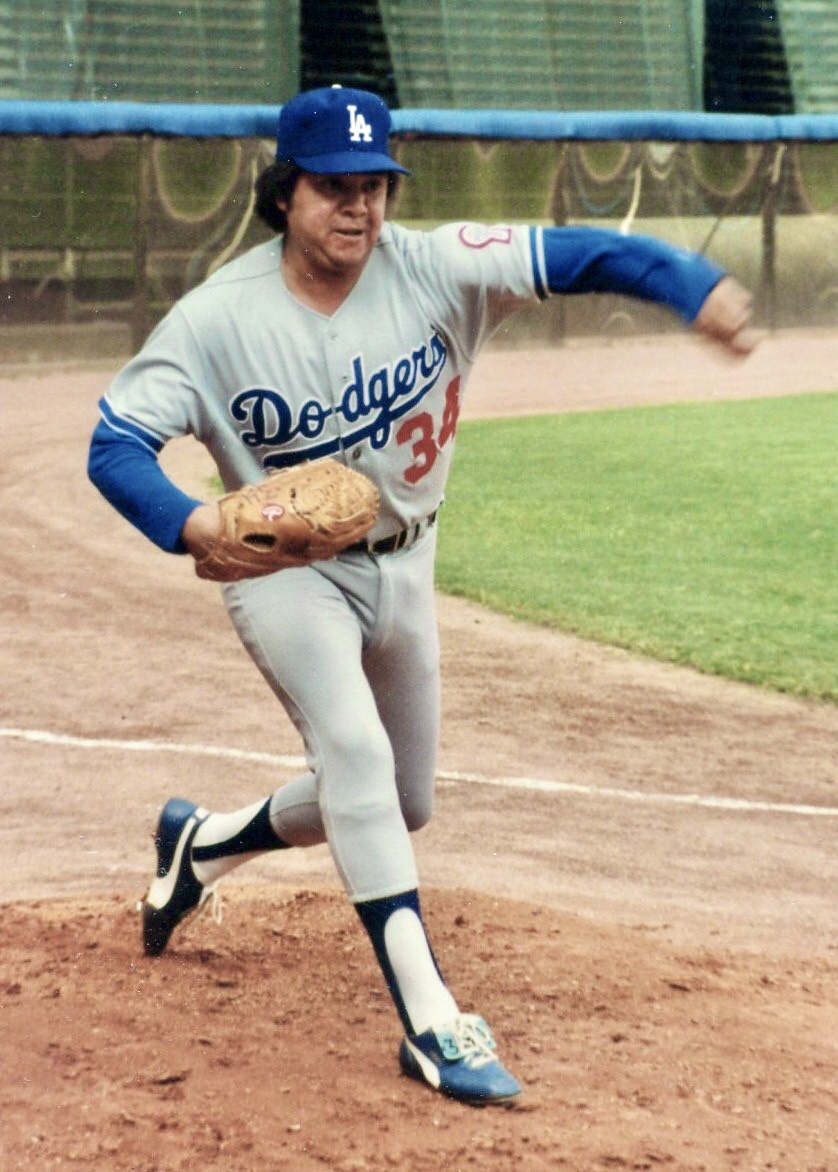
Game 4 winning pitcher Fernando Valenzuela

Saturday, October 10, 1981 5:15 pm (PT) at Dodger Stadium in Los Angeles, California 68 °F (20 °C), Mostly Cloudy
Team	1	2	3	4	5	6	7	8	9	R	H	E
Houston	0	0	0	0	0	0	0	0	1	1	4	0
Los Angeles	0	0	0	0	1	0	1	0	X	2	4	0
WP: Fernando Valenzuela (1–0) LP: Vern Ruhle (0–1); Home runs: HOU: None; LAD: Pedro Guerrero (1); Attendance: 55,983; Boxscore

Fernando Valenzuela took the hill for the Dodgers once again, this time against Vern Ruhle. Both pitchers pitched complete games for their respective teams in a duel that saw each team combine for two hits with runners in scoring position. Eventual World Series co-MVP Pedro Guerrero got the Dodgers on the board first with a homer in the bottom of the fifth. Bill Russell drove in the second run for Los Angeles in the bottom of the seventh with an RBI single. In the top of the ninth inning, Terry Puhl hit a one-out double. With two out, Tony Scott hit a single to let that scored Puhl and brought up José Cruz. A few pitches later, Cruz popped up a flyball to the catcher to end the game.

=== Game 5 ===
Sunday, October 11, 1981 1:05 pm (PT) at Dodger Stadium in Los Angeles, California 67 °F (19 °C), Partly Cloudy
Team	1	2	3	4	5	6	7	8	9	R	H	E
Houston	0	0	0	0	0	0	0	0	0	0	5	3
Los Angeles	0	0	0	0	0	3	1	0	X	4	7	2
WP: Jerry Reuss (1–0) LP: Nolan Ryan (1–1); Home runs: HOU: none LAD: none Attendance: 55,979; Boxscore

Nolan Ryan was brought in on clinching day to win the Astros their first postseason series. Opposing him would be Jerry Reuss, who had pitched so well in Game 2. The sixth proved disastrous for Ryan. He drew a leadoff flyout before Dusty Baker managed to get a walk to first base and Steve Garvey advanced him to third on a single. Rick Monday broke the tie with a single to right field. A batter later, Mike Scioscia hit a single to score Garvey before Bill Russell hit a ground ball to third that went past the first baseman on the throw that got Monday to score. Ryan was pulled for a pinch hitter in the following inning. A two-out triple by Steve Garvey made it 4–0 Dodgers in the seventh. In the end, Reuss went the distance again and pitched a brilliant five-hit shutout to put the Dodgers in the 1981 National League Championship Series. In addition, the Dodgers avenged their loss to the Astros the previous year in a one-game playoff for the NL West title.

=== Composite box ===
1981 NLDS (3–2): Los Angeles Dodgers over Houston Astros

Team	1	2	3	4	5	6	7	8	9	10	11	R	H	E
Los Angeles Dodgers	3	0	0	0	1	3	3	3	0	0	0	13	32	3
Houston Astros	0	0	1	0	0	1	0	0	3	0	1	6	29	5
Total attendance: 246,016 Average attendance: 49,203

== Philadelphia vs. Montreal ==
=== Game 1 ===
Wednesday, October 7, 1981 1:05 pm (ET) at Olympic Stadium in Montreal, Quebec 44 °F (7 °C), Overcast
Team	1	2	3	4	5	6	7	8	9	R	H	E
Philadelphia	0	1	0	0	0	0	0	0	0	1	10	1
Montreal	1	1	0	1	0	0	0	0	X	3	8	0
WP: Steve Rogers (1–0) LP: Steve Carlton (0–1) Sv: Jeff Reardon (1); Home runs: PHI: Keith Moreland (1); MTL: None; Attendance: 34,237; Boxscore

In the other division series, the first MLB postseason game in Canada (and outside of the United States) featured the Expos in their playoff debut against the defending World Champions, the Philadelphia Phillies. Steve Rogers faced Steve Carlton in Game 1 in Montreal. A Gary Carter double scored the first Expo run in postseason history in the first. Keith Moreland homered to lead off the second, tying the game. In the bottom of the second inning, Chris Speier hit a double, driving in Tim Wallach to put the Expos in the lead for the remainder of the game. Warren Cromartie doubled in the fourth to drive in Speier for the final Expo run of the game. Rogers pitched 8 2/3 innings, giving up ten hits and one run. Jeff Reardon got the final out and the save. This was the Expos' first postseason victory.

=== Game 2 ===
Thursday, October 8, 1981 8:15 pm (ET) at Olympic Stadium in Montreal, Quebec 46 °F (8 °C), mostly cloudy
Team	1	2	3	4	5	6	7	8	9	R	H	E
Philadelphia	0	0	0	0	0	0	0	1	0	1	6	2
Montreal	0	1	2	0	0	0	0	0	X	3	7	0
WP: Bill Gullickson (1–0) LP: Dick Ruthven (0–1) Sv: Jeff Reardon (2); Home runs: PHI: None; MTL: Gary Carter (1); Attendance: 45,896; Boxscore

Dick Ruthven started the game for Philadelphia against Montreal's Bill Gullickson. Chris Speier's RBI single in the second, followed by a two-run homer in the third by Gary Carter resulted in a 3–0 lead for the Expos. Gullickson allowed only one run – on Pete Rose's RBI single in the eighth after a two-out double by Lonnie Smith – and six hits in 7 2/3 innings. Jeff Reardon got the save for the second consecutive game.

=== Game 3 ===
Friday, October 9, 1981 4:05 pm (ET) at Veterans Stadium in Philadelphia, Pennsylvania 60 °F (16 °C), mostly cloudy
Team	1	2	3	4	5	6	7	8	9	R	H	E
Montreal	0	1	0	0	0	0	0	1	0	2	8	4
Philadelphia	0	2	0	0	0	2	2	0	X	6	13	0
WP: Larry Christenson (1–0) LP: Ray Burris (0–1); Home runs: MTL: none PHI: none Attendance: 36,835; Boxscore

Ray Burris started for the Expos against the Phillies' Larry Christenson. In the second, Chris Speier hit an RBI single to give the Expos an initial lead. Manny Trillo's two-run single in the bottom of the second put the Phillies ahead 2–1. Two more RBI singles made it 4–1 in the sixth. Two more runs for the Phillies in the seventh gave them six for the night. The Expos would score a second run on a sacrifice fly in the seventh, resulting in a final 6–2 score.

=== Game 4 ===
Saturday, October 10, 1981 1:05 pm (ET) at Veterans Stadium in Philadelphia, Pennsylvania 56 °F (13 °C), mostly cloudy
Team	1	2	3	4	5	6	7	8	9	10	R	H	E
Montreal	0	0	0	1	1	2	1	0	0	0	5	10	1
Philadelphia	2	0	2	0	0	1	0	0	0	1	6	9	0
WP: Tug McGraw (1–0) LP: Jeff Reardon (0–1); Home runs: MTL: Gary Carter (2); PHI: Mike Schmidt (1), Gary Matthews (1), George Vukovich (1); Attendance: 38,818; Boxscore

Arguably the best game of the series took place in Game 4. Scott Sanderson started against Dickie Noles. The Phillies jumped out to a 2–0 lead in the first on a two-run homer by Mike Schmidt. Keith Moreland's two-run single made it 4–0 in the third. Gary Carter homered to lead off the fourth to make it 4–1. A Jerry White sacrifice fly made it 4–2 in the fifth. The Expos tied the game in the top of the sixth inning with John Milner driving in Larry Parrish with a single, and Wallace Johnson subsequently driving in Chris Speier with a single. Gary Matthews homer for the Phillies in the bottom of the sixth, regaining the lead. Gary Carter doubled to tie the game again in the seventh. In the bottom of the tenth, George Vukovich hit a leadoff homer off Jeff Reardon to win the game, tying the series at two games apiece.

=== Game 5 ===
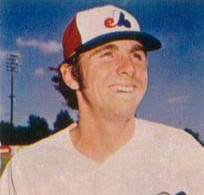
Game 5 winning pitcher Steve Rogers

Sunday, October 11, 1981 4:05 pm (ET) at Veterans Stadium in Philadelphia, Pennsylvania 60 °F (16 °C), mostly cloudy
Team	1	2	3	4	5	6	7	8	9	R	H	E
Montreal	0	0	0	0	2	1	0	0	0	3	8	1
Philadelphia	0	0	0	0	0	0	0	0	0	0	6	0
WP: Steve Rogers (2–0) LP: Steve Carlton (0–2); Home runs: MTL: none PHI: none Attendance: 47,384; Boxscore

In Game 5, the defending champions sent their best, Steve Carlton, to the mound against Steve Rogers. Both pitchers kept the game scoreless through four innings. A single and two walks in the top of the fifth loaded the bases for Rogers. In what proved to be the series-winning hit, Rogers singled to center, scoring Larry Parrish and Chris Speier. An RBI double by Parrish in the sixth made it 3–0. That would be all Rogers would need: he allowed only six hits and one walk in a complete-game shutout of the defending world champions. His brilliance led the Expos to the NLCS and their first postseason series win.

=== Composite box ===
1981 NLDS (3–2): Montreal Expos over Philadelphia Phillies

Team	1	2	3	4	5	6	7	8	9	10	R	H	E
Montreal Expos	1	3	2	2	3	3	1	1	0	0	16	41	6
Philadelphia Phillies	2	3	2	0	0	3	2	1	0	1	14	44	3
Total attendance: 203,170 Average attendance: 40,634
