= Lee Weyer =

American baseball umpire (1936-1988)

- Umpire
- Born: September 3, 1936; Imlay City, Michigan, U.S.
- Died: July 4, 1988 (aged 51); San Mateo, California, U.S.

MLB debut
- 1959

Career highlights and awards
- Special Assignments: World Series (1969, 1976, 1982, 1987); NLCS (1971, 1974, 1978, 1983, 1986); NLDS (1981); All-Star Games (1965, 1972, 1979, 1984)

Lee Howard "Big Lee" Weyer (September 3, 1936 – July 4, 1988) was an American umpire in Major League Baseball who worked in the National League from 1961 until his death. In a 1987 Sports Illustrated poll of National League catchers, Weyer was rated the best at calling balls and strikes. He was the home plate umpire on September 11, 1985, in Cincinnati's Riverfront Stadium when Pete Rose collected his 4,192nd hit to break Ty Cobb's career record, and was the third base umpire in the April 8, 1974 game in which Hank Aaron broke Babe Ruth's record of 714 career home runs.

== Early life and career ==
Born in Imlay City, Michigan, Weyer had a few tryouts for the minor leagues as a player before beginning his umpiring career in 1956 on the advice of NL umpire and local resident Frank Secory. He worked in the Midwest League (1956–57), Southern Association (1958–59) and International League (1960–61), and was first placed under contract with the NL at age 23 in 1959 while he was in the Army. He was scheduled to join the league's regular staff for the 1961 season, to help prepare for the league's expansion from eight teams to ten the following year, until a February car accident which also took his mother's life; after six months of recuperation he finally made his debut by working a few NL games in September 1961. His ongoing commitment to the U.S. Army Reserve until July 1962 delayed his joining the staff full-time for another season; after again umpiring some International League games, he worked some NL games in August 1962, filling in for Chris Pelekoudas, who was recuperating from abdominal surgery, then became a full member of the league staff in 1963 to replace the retired Dusty Boggess.

== MLB umpiring career ==
Weyer umpired in the World Series in 1969, 1976, 1982 and 1987, serving as crew chief in 1976 and 1982. He also officiated in five National League Championship Series (1971, 1974, 1978, 1983, 1986, as crew chief in 1978), the 1981 National League Division Series (Western Division), and four All-Star games (1965, 1972, 1979, 1984), calling balls and strikes for the last of these. Weyer was behind the plate on April 16, 1978, when Bob Forsch of the St. Louis Cardinals pitched the first of his two no-hitters, a 5–0 victory over the Philadelphia Phillies.

Weyer was widely regarded as having one of the overall largest strike zones in baseball, which was partially attributed to his large size at 6'6"; when teaching umpiring, he stated, "Don't be afraid to call strikes. A big strike zone gets the hitters swinging, making for more outs and a quicker game." He often liked to dig trenches on either side of home plate to expose the black edge portions, which are often borderline pitches between balls and strikes. He wore uniform number 23 when the NL adopted uniform numbers in the 1960s, and was the only umpire to wear a white chest protector, which was prominent because he almost always wore his plate coat when calling balls and strikes, even on hotter days.

In 1980, after a spring training episode of bronchitis, Weyer was diagnosed as having Guillain–Barré syndrome, a potentially life-threatening disorder which can affect muscle control and even cause blindness. He rebounded after suffering from blurred vision, returning to the field in late August, and also returned from a bout with diabetes in 1982.

== Personal life ==
Weyer resided in Imlay City until 1969, when he relocated to the Atlanta area; he later moved to Los Angeles in 1977 and to Lauderdale Lakes, Florida in 1985. He married Gay Valentine Clem on November 2, 1963, divorcing approximately ten years later, which he mainly attributed to her difficulty in adjusting to his umpiring career. The split was so amicable, however, she agreed to continue doing his laundry for as long as he lived in Atlanta, which she did even after she remarried.

== Death ==
On July 4, 1988, Weyer suffered a massive heart attack at the San Mateo, California home of fellow umpire Ed Montague, while playing basketball with Montague's children. He was taken by paramedics to Mills Hospital in San Mateo, where he was pronounced dead at age 51. Weyer and Montague, close friends who had partnered on quite a popular amateur magic act, had umpired together in a game between the San Francisco Giants and Chicago Cubs at Candlestick Park earlier that afternoon, with Weyer at first base. Weyer's father had died of a heart attack at age 53, and a brother had died of a heart attack at age 52. At the time of his death Weyer was engaged to be married to Linda Hickey, a resident of Long Island, New York. He was buried in Imlay Cemetery in his hometown.

== See also ==
- List of baseball players who died during their careers
- List of Major League Baseball umpires (disambiguation)
