= Lance Clemons =

American baseball player (1947–2008)

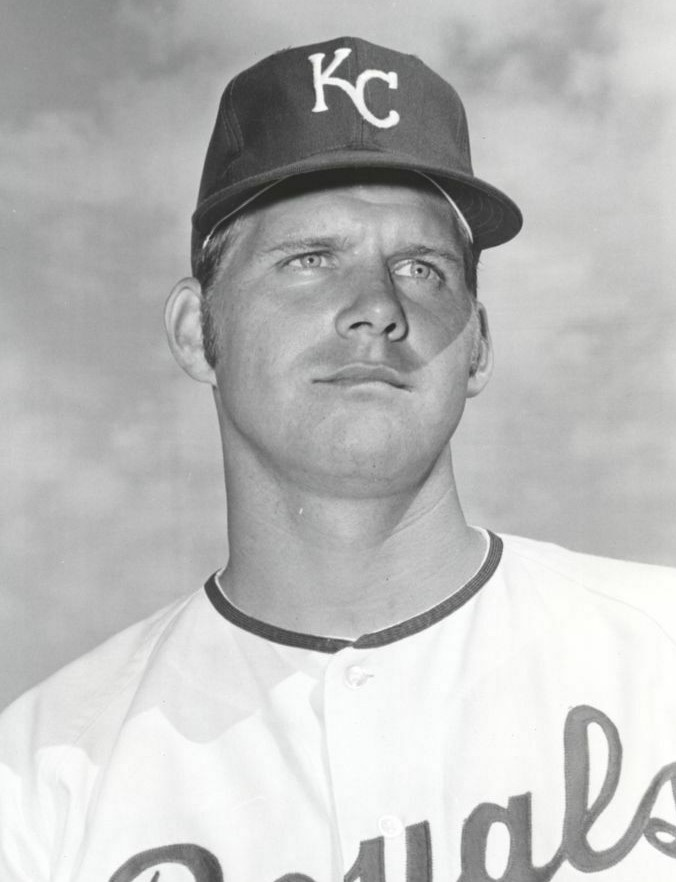
- Pitcher
- Born: July 6, 1947; Philadelphia, Pennsylvania, U.S.
- Died: January 22, 2008 (aged 60); Brooksville, Florida, U.S.
- Batted: Left Threw: Left

MLB debut
- August 12, 1971, for the Kansas City Royals

Last MLB appearance
- October 2, 1974, for the Boston Red Sox

MLB statistics
- Win–loss record: 2–1
- Earned run average: 6.06
- Strikeouts: 23
- Stats at Baseball Reference

Teams
- Kansas City Royals (1971); St. Louis Cardinals (1972); Boston Red Sox (1974)

Lance Levis Clemons (July 6, 1947 – January 22, 2008) was an American left-handed pitcher in Major League Baseball who played for the Kansas City Royals (1971), St. Louis Cardinals (1972) and Boston Red Sox (1974).

Clemons was born in Philadelphia, Pennsylvania. He was traded with Jim York from the Royals to the Houston Astros for John Mayberry and minor league infielder Dave Grangaard at the Winter Meetings on December 2, 1971. He never appeared in a regular season game with the Astros who dealt him along with Scipio Spinks to the Cardinals for Jerry Reuss four months later on April 15, 1972. In a three-season career, he posted a 2–1 record with 23 strikeouts and a 6.06 earned run average in 19 games pitched. He died of cancer at age 60.
