= 1982 World Series =

79th edition of Major League Baseball's championship series

Team (Wins)	Managers	Season
St. Louis Cardinals (4)	Whitey Herzog	92–70, .568, GA: 3
Milwaukee Brewers (3)	Harvey Kuenn	95–67, .586, GA: 1
- Dates: October 12–20
- Venue(s): Busch Stadium (St. Louis); Milwaukee County Stadium (Milwaukee)
- MVP: Darrell Porter (St. Louis)
- Umpires: Lee Weyer (NL), Bill Haller (AL), John Kibler (NL), Dave Phillips (AL), Satch Davidson (NL), Jim Evans (AL)
- Hall of Famers: Cardinals: Whitey Herzog (manager); Jim Kaat; Ozzie Smith; Bruce Sutter; Brewers: Rollie Fingers (DNP); Paul Molitor; Ted Simmons; Don Sutton; Robin Yount

Broadcast
- Television: NBC
- TV announcers: Joe Garagiola, Dick Enberg, and Tony Kubek
- Radio: CBS; KMOX (STL); WISN (MIL)
- Radio announcers: Vin Scully and Sparky Anderson (CBS); Jack Buck and Mike Shannon (KMOX); Bob Uecker and Dwayne Mosley (WISN)
- ALCS: Milwaukee Brewers over California Angels (3–2)
- NLCS: St. Louis Cardinals over Atlanta Braves (3–0)

The 1982 World Series was the championship series of Major League Baseball's (MLB) 1982 season. The 79th edition of the World Series, it was a best-of-seven playoff played between the National League (NL) champion St. Louis Cardinals and the American League (AL) champion Milwaukee Brewers. The Cardinals defeated the Brewers in seven games to win their first championship since 1967, and their ninth overall.

The Cardinals had last been in the World Series in 1968, while a Milwaukee team, the Braves, had last contended in 1958. The Milwaukee team of 1982 started as an expansion club, the Seattle Pilots, in 1969, which then moved to Milwaukee in 1970 and changed their name to the Brewers.

The Cardinals made it to the Series by winning the NL East division by three games over the Philadelphia Phillies, and then defeating the Atlanta Braves, three games to none, in the NL Championship Series. The Brewers made it by winning the AL East division by one game over the Baltimore Orioles, and then defeating the California Angels, three games to two, in the AL Championship Series. The Brewers would join the Cardinals as a member of the National League Central Division in 1998.

The Cardinals' victory helped the National League win four straight World Series from 1979 to 1982, the longest streak of consecutive titles by the National League in World Series history. The National League would not again win consecutive titles until the 2010 Giants, the 2011 Cardinals and the 2012 Giants.

Though the teams had never met before, their home cities had a commercial rivalry in the beer market, as St. Louis is the home of Anheuser–Busch, which owned the Cardinals at the time, while Milwaukee is the home of Miller Brewing and other past major competitors of Anheuser–Busch. This led the media to refer to the series as the "Suds Series".

This was the Brewers’ only appearance in the World Series until 2026. Until then, they had the second longest pennant drought in the National League behind only the Pittsburgh Pirates, who last won the pennant in 1979.

== Preview ==
The 1982 Milwaukee Brewers hit 216 home runs during the regular season, thus earning them the nickname "Harvey's Wallbangers" (after manager and Milwaukee native, Harvey Kuenn). In sharp contrast, the 1982 St. Louis Cardinals only hit 67 home runs, fewer than the Brewers' Gorman Thomas (with 39 homers) and Ben Oglivie (34 homers) combined. The Cardinals had built their reputation and won their division behind solid pitching, exceptional defense, and aggressive base running, manufacturing runs in a style that would come to be called "Whiteyball," named for team manager Whitey Herzog. This style would be the hallmark of the Cardinals through the 1980s and see them into two more World Series (in 1985 and 1987, both of which they lost in seven games).

The Brewers and Cardinals each boasted a dominant closer, with veteran Rollie Fingers in the role for Milwaukee and Bruce Sutter for St. Louis. Fingers did not pitch in this series, which would have been his fourth, due to a muscle tear in his arm.

The two teams had made a trade in December 1980 of benefit to both clubs. Milwaukee traded pitchers Dave LaPoint and Lary Sorensen and outfielders Sixto Lezcano and David Green to the Cardinals, in exchange for pitcher Pete Vuckovich and catcher Ted Simmons.

The Cardinals built their team on speed, clutch hitting, and pitching. The Cardinals traded for Willie McGee, Ozzie Smith, George Hendrick, and Joaquín Andújar, as well as Sutter.

The Brewers combined a productive farm system with trades as well to build their heavy-hitting ball club. Thomas, Moose Haas, Robin Yount, and Paul Molitor came through the system, while Vuckovich, Simmons, Fingers, and Oglivie, plus Cecil Cooper and Don Money, all arrived via trade. On June 1, with the team 23–24 and in fifth place, GM Harry Dalton replaced manager Buck Rodgers with Harvey Kuenn. The Brewers responded by winning at a .626 clip the rest of the way, taking first place for good on July 31 and never looking back.

== Summary ==
NL St. Louis Cardinals (4) vs. AL Milwaukee Brewers (3)

Game	Date	Score	Location	Time	Attendance
1	October 12	Milwaukee Brewers – 10, St. Louis Cardinals – 0	Busch Stadium	2:30	53,723
2	October 13	Milwaukee Brewers – 4, St. Louis Cardinals – 5	Busch Stadium	2:54	53,723
3	October 15	St. Louis Cardinals – 6, Milwaukee Brewers – 2	County Stadium	2:53	56,556
4	October 16	St. Louis Cardinals – 5, Milwaukee Brewers – 7	County Stadium	3:04	56,560
5	October 17	St. Louis Cardinals – 4, Milwaukee Brewers – 6	County Stadium	3:02	56,562
6	October 19	Milwaukee Brewers – 1, St. Louis Cardinals – 13	Busch Stadium	2:21	53,723
7	October 20	Milwaukee Brewers – 3, St. Louis Cardinals – 6	Busch Stadium	2:50	53,723

== Matchups ==
=== Game 1 ===
October 12, 1982 7:30 pm (CT) at Busch Stadium in St. Louis, Missouri 61 °F (16 °C), clear
Team	1	2	3	4	5	6	7	8	9	R	H	E
Milwaukee	2	0	0	1	1	2	0	0	4	10	17	0
St. Louis	0	0	0	0	0	0	0	0	0	0	3	1
WP: Mike Caldwell (1–0) LP: Bob Forsch (0–1); Home runs: MIL: Ted Simmons (1); STL: None

This was the Brewers' first ever game in the World Series.

The Brewers' left-hander Mike Caldwell pitched a complete-game shutout, allowing only three hits. The Brewers' offense was led by Paul Molitor, who had a World Series-record five hits and two RBIs. Robin Yount added four hits and two RBIs.

The Brewers went up 2–0 in the first when Cardinals' first baseman Keith Hernandez's error on Ben Oglivie ground ball with two on scored a run, then Gorman Thomas's RBI single scored another. Charlie Moore doubled to lead off the fourth and scored on Molitor's single while former Cardinal Ted Simmons homered next inning. Cardinals starter Bob Forsch allowed consecutive two-out singles to Jim Gantner and Molitor in the sixth before both scored on Yount's double and knocked Forsch out of the game. In the ninth, Oglivie walked with one out off of Dave LaPoint, moved to second on a groundout, and scored on Don Money's single. Jeff Lahti relieved LaPoint and allowed a single to Moore. Gantner's triple then scored two before Gantner himself scored on Molitor's single to cap the scoring at 10–0.

This was their last postseason win on the road until October 13, 2011, also against the St. Louis Cardinals.

=== Game 2 ===
October 13, 1982 7:20 pm (CT) at Busch Stadium in St. Louis, Missouri 55 °F (13 °C), overcast
Team	1	2	3	4	5	6	7	8	9	R	H	E
Milwaukee	0	1	2	0	1	0	0	0	0	4	10	1
St. Louis	0	0	2	0	0	2	0	1	X	5	8	0
WP: Bruce Sutter (1–0) LP: Bob McClure (0–1); Home runs: MIL: Ted Simmons (2); STL: None

The Brew Crew drew first blood in the second with an RBI double by Charlie Moore. They followed that in the third when Paul Molitor singled, stole second, went to third on a wild pitch by Cardinals starter John Stuper, and scored on a Robin Yount groundout. Ted Simmons stretched the lead to 3–0 with his second homer in two games. The Cardinals scratched back in their half of the third when rookie Willie McGee singled, stole second, and scored on a Tom Herr double. Ken Oberkfell singled in Herr to cut the Brewer lead to 3–2. The Brewers made it 4–2 in the fifth when Yount doubled and Cecil Cooper singled him in.

Darrell Porter tied it in the sixth by doubling in two runs. Then, in the bottom of the eighth, the Brewers felt the effects of not having Rollie Fingers in the bullpen. With one out, Pete Ladd, pressed into service as the closer, walked Lonnie Smith with two on to load the bases and then walked pinch-hitter Steve Braun to force in the go-ahead run. The Cardinals could have made it worse, but McGee lined out to short for out #2, and an apparent base hit by Ozzie Smith struck Braun as he was running to second for the third out.

Bruce Sutter pitched the ninth and got credit for the win.

Longtime American League umpire Bill Haller called his final game behind home plate in this contest. He also was the last umpire to wear a tie on the field, and the last to work home plate in the World Series wearing the "balloon" style outside chest protector.

=== Game 3 ===
October 15, 1982 7:30 pm (CT) at County Stadium in Milwaukee, Wisconsin 52 °F (11 °C), partly cloudy
Team	1	2	3	4	5	6	7	8	9	R	H	E
St. Louis	0	0	0	0	3	0	2	0	1	6	6	1
Milwaukee	0	0	0	0	0	0	0	2	0	2	5	3
WP: Joaquín Andújar (1–0) LP: Pete Vuckovich (0–1) Sv: Bruce Sutter (1); Home runs: STL: Willie McGee 2 (2); MIL: Cecil Cooper (1)

Game Three home run and defensive hero, Willie McGee.

Joaquín Andújar and Pete Vuckovich, each team's pitching ace, were locked in a scoreless duel until the top of the fifth, when Willie McGee hit a three-run homer.

The Redbirds added two more in the seventh off Vuckovich. Lonnie Smith doubled to right-center and tried to stretch it to a triple. Smith scored when Jim Gantner's relay throw to third went wild. McGee followed with a home run later in the inning, his second.

McGee had a couple of defensive gems, running down a deep Paul Molitor drive in the first and robbing Gorman Thomas of a home run in the ninth.

In the seventh with one out, Andújar had to leave the game when a line drive from Ted Simmons struck his kneecap. The Brewers loaded the bases in that inning, but ace reliever Bruce Sutter got the final out to squelch the threat.

Cecil Cooper accounted for the Brewers' only runs with a two-run homer in the eighth off Sutter. Ozzie Smith drove in the Cardinals final run with a bases-loaded walk after George Hendrick reached first on catcher's interference by Ted Simmons and went to third on a ground-rule double by Lonnie Smith with two outs. Cardinals manager Whitey Herzog argued that Hendrick reached second as he was running with the pitch with two outs and should have been allowed to score on the double, but to no avail. McGee was walked intentionally, loading the bases, followed by Ozzie Smith's walk.

Sutter qualified for the save in this game (even though the Cards had a 5–0 lead when he entered the game), since he entered with the bases loaded, meaning the potential tying run was on deck.

=== Game 4 ===
October 16, 1982 12:20 pm (CT) at County Stadium in Milwaukee, Wisconsin 46 °F (8 °C), partly sunny
Team	1	2	3	4	5	6	7	8	9	R	H	E
St. Louis	1	3	0	0	0	1	0	0	0	5	8	1
Milwaukee	0	0	0	0	1	0	6	0	X	7	10	2
WP: Jim Slaton (1–0) LP: Doug Bair (0–1) Sv: Bob McClure (1)

Game 4 of the 1982 World Series pitted Dave LaPoint (9–3) against Moose Haas (11–8). Haas was a veteran of six major league campaigns while LaPoint had just completed his first full season.

For six innings, the Cardinals seemed on the verge of taking a commanding 3–1 Series lead. Dave LaPoint held the Brewers to three hits in that time span, while his hitters plated him a 5–1 lead.

In the top of the first inning, Ken Oberkfell doubled down the right-field line and George Hendrick hit a high chopper over the middle which handcuffed Yount and bounced into center-field, allowing Oberkfell to score. In the bottom of the first, Oberkfell dropped a bare-handed grounder from Yount. Both teams had trouble at times fielding, and the Brewers errors in Game 3 may have cost them three runs.

Two Cardinal runs came in the second on an unusual way. With Willie McGee on first and attempting to steal, Brewers catcher Ted Simmons took a pitch-out but bobbled the ball allowing McGee to steal second. After a walk to Ozzie Smith, Moose Haas' wild pitch moved McGee to third and Smith to second. Tommy Herr hit a deep fly. McGee scored easily and Smith took advantage of center fielder Gorman Thomas slipping and falling on the warning track and never stopped, scoring behind McGee for a two-run sacrifice fly for Herr. Ken Oberkfell followed with a walk, stole second and came home when a Keith Hernandez grounder went through Gantner's legs. The Cardinals scored three times despite only one base hit.

In the Brewers half of the fifth, with none out and runners at first and third, Ozzie Smith made one of his famous Wizard of Oz plays. Gantner hit a ground ball through the middle towards center field. Smith, though off-balance, stabbed at the ball while simultaneously stepping on second base, recovered and fired to first to double up Gantner.

In the seventh, things fell apart. With one out, Oglivie reached first when first baseman Keith Hernandez's toss to LaPoint was dropped. LaPoint was relieved by Doug Bair after giving up a two-out RBI (unearned) double to Gantner. Before relieved by Jim Kaat, Bair walked Molitor and gave up a bases-loaded, two-run (both unearned) checked-swing single to Yount. An RBI infield hit by Cecil Cooper and a wild pitch brought in the fourth Cardinals pitcher, Jeff Lahti. Lahti intentionally walked (charged to Kaat) Simmons and gave up another bases-loaded, two-run single to Thomas. Lahti issued another intentional walk to Oglivie then induced a fly out to left field to end this inning. In this inning, six runs (three earned) crossed the plate for the Brewers on five hits and one error.

Jim Slaton started the eighth by walking Darrell Porter and giving up a one-out single to Dane Iorg. Bob McClure relieved Slaton and ended the threat by getting McGee to bounce into a double play. McClure went the rest of the way for the save.

=== Game 5 ===
October 17, 1982 3:45 pm (CT) at County Stadium in Milwaukee, Wisconsin 50 °F (10 °C),cloudy
Team	1	2	3	4	5	6	7	8	9	R	H	E
St. Louis	0	0	1	0	0	0	1	0	2	4	15	2
Milwaukee	1	0	1	0	1	0	1	2	X	6	11	1
WP: Mike Caldwell (2–0) LP: Bob Forsch (0–2) Sv: Bob McClure (2); Home runs: STL: None; MIL: Robin Yount (1)

Cardinals manager Whitey Herzog made some lineup changes for this game, dropping Tom Herr from leadoff to eighth and Ken Oberkfell from second to seventh. He led off with hot-hitting Lonnie Smith at DH, started David Green in centerfield and batted him second in place of Dane Iorg, and moved Willie McGee from eighth to sixth.

Mike Caldwell pitched his second win of the Series and almost went the distance. The Brewers struck first on Ted Simmons's bases loaded groundout in the first off of Bob Forsch, but the Cardinals tied the game in the third on Keith Hernandez's RBI double. The Brewers took a 2–1 lead in the bottom half on Cecil Cooper's groundout with runners on first and third and added to their lead on Paul Molitor's RBI single in the fifth. George Hendrick's RBI single in the seventh cut the Brewers lead to 3–2, but they got that run back in the bottom of the inning on Robin Yount's home run, then added to their lead in the eighth on back-to-back RBI singles by Charlie Moore and Jim Gantner off of Bruce Sutter. The Cardinals staged a late rally in the ninth as Keith Hernandez doubled in a run and George Hendrick singled him in with two outs. Bob McClure came in and allowed a single to Darrell Porter, putting the tying run on base. McClure, however, struck out Willie McGee, then retired pinch-hitter Gene Tenace to end the game. Robin Yount set a World Series record by recording his second four-hit game, his first came in Game 1. To this day, Yount remains the only player to have multiple 4-hit games in one World Series.

This was the tenth and final World Series game at Milwaukee County Stadium (1957, 1958 and 1982) as well as the final postseason game at Milwaukee County Stadium.

=== Game 6 ===
October 19, 1982 7:20 pm (CT) at Busch Stadium in St. Louis, Missouri 70 °F (21 °C), overcast w/ rain incoming
Team	1	2	3	4	5	6	7	8	9	R	H	E
Milwaukee	0	0	0	0	0	0	0	0	1	1	4	4
St. Louis	0	2	0	3	2	6	0	0	X	13	12	1
WP: John Stuper (1–0) LP: Don Sutton (0–1); Home runs: MIL: None; STL: Darrell Porter (1), Keith Hernandez (1)

Busch Stadium's lack of a dome caused two delays that totaled over 2 1/2 hours. The Cardinals staved off elimination with a blowout win. In the second, Dane Iorg doubled with two outs off of Don Sutton and scored on an error on Willie McGee's ground ball. Tom Herr's double then made it 2–0 Cardinals.

The Cardinals appeared to get a third run in the bottom of the third when Lonnie Smith walked, stole second, and went to third on a Keith Hernandez groundout. With George Hendrick batting, Smith attempted to steal home and appeared to have clearly slid headfirst under Ted Simmons' tag, but he was ruled out by home plate umpire Jim Evans.

In the fourth, Darrell Porter hit a two-run home run, then Iorg tripled and scored on Herr's groundout. Keith Hernandez's two-run home run in the fifth made it 7–0 and knocked Sutton out of the game. After Sutton was removed, rains came and delayed the game for 26 minutes before Jim Slaton came in and retired the next two hitters.

In the sixth, Iorg hit a leadoff double, moved to third on a wild pitch by Doc Medich, and scored on McGee's single. Herr reached on a bloop single and Medich threw another wild pitch, sending McGee to third and Herr to second. After Ozzie Smith was retired, David Green, who replaced Lonnie Smith due to an injured wrist, walked to load the bases. Another rain delay, this time for two hours, occurred in the middle of Green's at-bat. After Ken Oberkfell grounded into a force-out at home, Hernandez's single then scored two, Hendrick's single scored another, and an error on Porter's ground ball scored two more.

The Brewers avoided a shutout in the ninth when Jim Gantner, who doubled to lead off the inning, scored on a passed ball by Cardinals backup catcher Glenn Brummer. John Stuper went the distance for the Cardinals (helped by the rain delays), scattering four hits.

The Cardinals’ twelve-run margin of victory in Game 6 was the largest in a World Series game since Game 6 of the 1968 World Series (which, ironically, was a Cardinals loss), and is tied for the third largest margin of victory in a World Series game overall.

=== Game 7 ===
October 20, 1982 7:20 pm (CT) at Busch Stadium in St. Louis, Missouri 44 °F (7 °C), mostly clear
Team	1	2	3	4	5	6	7	8	9	R	H	E
Milwaukee	0	0	0	0	1	2	0	0	0	3	7	0
St. Louis	0	0	0	1	0	3	0	2	X	6	15	1
WP: Joaquín Andújar (2–0) LP: Bob McClure (0–2) Sv: Bruce Sutter (2); Home runs: MIL: Ben Oglivie (1); STL: None

Joaquín Andújar and Pete Vuckovich opposed each other once again, and both had injuries. Andujar had decreased mobility after the line drive he had taken off the kneecap in Game 3, while Vuckovich was suffering from severe shoulder pain which would be diagnosed the following spring as a torn rotator cuff. The game was scoreless until the bottom of the fourth when the Cardinals scored first on a Lonnie Smith RBI single. Ben Oglivie tied it for the Brewers in the fifth with a solo home run, and they took a 3–1 lead in the sixth when Jim Gantner scored on an error and Cecil Cooper hit a sacrifice fly.

However, starting in the bottom of the sixth, with one out, the Cardinals mounted a comeback and held the Brewers scoreless for the rest of the game. Ozzie Smith singled and Lonnie Smith doubled him to third. Brewers manager Harvey Kuenn then pulled Vuckovich in favor of Bob McClure, who walked pinch-hitter Gene Tenace to load the bases. Keith Hernandez then tied the game with a two-run single (off McClure, who was a high-school teammate of Hernandez') George Hendrick then gave the Cardinals the lead with an RBI single.

Series MVP Darrell Porter and Steve Braun delivered the key blows in the eighth with RBI singles, giving the Cardinals a 6–3 lead. Andújar pitched seven strong innings. After recording the final out of the seventh on Gantner, the two men appeared as if they were going to physically fight after Andujar made a gesture of exuberance, and home plate umpire Lee Weyer had to step between them and move Andujar towards the dugout to prevent a fist fight. Manager Herzog, concerned that his unpredictable starter would allow himself to lose concentration after the incident, then turned to closer Bruce Sutter for a two-inning save, his second save of the series. This was the first time since 1964 that a National League team had won a seventh game of the World Series at home, when the Cardinals themselves defeated the New York Yankees in seven games. It was also the only World Series championship that the Cardinals ever clinched at home during their 40-year tenure at the 2nd Busch Stadium (1966–2005).

== Composite box ==
1982 World Series (4–3): St. Louis Cardinals (N.L.) over Milwaukee Brewers (A.L.)

Team	1	2	3	4	5	6	7	8	9	R	H	E
St. Louis Cardinals	1	5	3	4	5	12	3	3	3	39	67	7
Milwaukee Brewers	3	1	3	1	5	4	7	4	5	33	64	11
Total attendance: 384,570 Average attendance: 54,939; Winning player's share: $43,280 Losing player's share: $31,935

== Series overview and aftermath ==
Paul Molitor set a World Series record with his fifth hit of the game, in the ninth inning of Game 1. Robin Yount would set another record in the seventh inning of Game 5 by becoming the first player in Series history to have two four-hit games in a single Series.

Cardinals catcher Darrell Porter was given the Series MVP award. Paul Molitor would eventually win the Series MVP Award 11 years later as a member of the Toronto Blue Jays.

Both participants are currently in the NL Central, due to the transfer of the Brewers from the American League to the National League in 1998. With the Brewers returning to the World Series in 2026, they are the fourth team to represent two leagues in the World Series. That has happened three times before, taking the 19th Century contests into account: The Brooklyn Dodgers of 1889 and 1890; the Cardinals, who won the 1886 Series when they were in the American Association; and the Houston Astros, who played in the 2005 World Series against the Chicago White Sox as a National League team, as well as the 2017 World Series against the Los Angeles Dodgers, the 2019 World Series against the Washington Nationals, the 2021 World Series against the Atlanta Braves and the 2022 World Series against the Philadelphia Phillies as an American League team. This also makes this one of two World Series in the modern era (1903–present) that is not possible to have a rematch, the other being the Astros and White Sox, due to the Astros moving to the American League in 2013.

The Brewers and Cardinals would later meet in the 2011 National League Championship Series, with the Cardinals winning that series four games to two. As in 1982, the Cardinals won the 2011 World Series in seven games, this time against the Texas Rangers. As of today, the Cardinals' 11 championships are the most won by any National League team, and second only to the New York Yankees, who have 27. As of the 1982 World Series victory, the Cardinals had 9 championships compared to the Yankees' 22.

The Cardinals would remain competitive for the rest of the decade and returned to the World Series in 1985 and 1987 but lost both times in seven games. St. Louis wouldn't get back to the fall classic until 2004 (losing to Boston in a four-game sweep) and would not win another World Championship until 2006 when they beat Detroit in five games.

The Brewers did not return to the World Series until 2026, where they won in five games to win their first title in franchise history. This would be the last championship series of the four major North American sports leagues to feature a team from Milwaukee until the Milwaukee Bucks made and won the 2021 NBA Finals, and the last Wisconsin-based team to play in a championship game until the Green Bay Packers won Super Bowl XXXI in 1997.

Game 7 was the last playoff game for the Brewers as an American League franchise. They did not qualify for the playoffs again until 2008, 10 years after they moved to the National League.

This would be the final World Series where both teams wore pullover style uniforms. From 1984 to 1987, at least one team wore pullovers (although in 1984, the Tigers only wore them on the road). No team has worn pullover uniforms in the fall classic since the Cincinnati Reds in 1990. The Brewers, who started wearing pullovers in 1972, switched to button-downs in 1990; the Cardinals, one of the earliest adopters of pullovers (1971), were the second-to-last team to ditch them, doing so in 1992 to celebrate the franchise's centennial (the Reds were the last team to wear pullovers, switching in 1993).

== Broadcasting ==
This was the final World Series telecast for longtime NBC analyst Tony Kubek, and the only one for veteran announcer Dick Enberg. Enberg hosted the pregame shows and alternated play-by-play duties (Enberg called the middle innings) with Joe Garagiola, who was himself working his last World Series in that role before moving to the color commentator position alongside Vin Scully (who called the 1982 World Series alongside Sparky Anderson for CBS Radio) the following season. Conversely, this was NBC's first World Series telecast to feature Bob Costas (who served as a field reporter and hosted the World Series Trophy presentation following Game 7). Costas and Kubek would subsequently team up as NBC's secondary MLB announcing team from 1983 to 1989. This included the June 23, 1984, game between St. Louis and Chicago otherwise known as the Ryne Sandberg game. Tom Seaver provided pregame analysis and also contributed occasional in-game commentary throughout the series, broadcasting from field level rather than in the booth.

Locally, the World Series was broadcast by the teams' flagship radio stations using their own announcers. In Milwaukee, WISN aired the games with Bob Uecker and Dwayne Mosley announcing, while in St. Louis, KMOX aired the games with Jack Buck and Mike Shannon announcing.

== See also ==
- 1982 Japan Series
- Suds Series rivalry
- Milwaukee Brewers reverse World Series curse
