= Jerry Dale =

American baseball umpire (born 1933)

- Born: Jerry Parker Dale; April 3, 1933 (age 93); Evansville, Indiana, U.S.
- Occupation: Umpire
- Years active: 1969-1985
- Employer: National League

Jerry Parker Dale (born April 3, 1933) is an American former professional baseball umpire who worked in the National League from 1970 to 1985, wearing uniform number 3 for most of his career, and the last NL umpire to wear number 3 as it was retired for Hall-of-Fame umpire Al Barlick. Dale umpired 1,987 major league games in his 16-year career. He umpired in one World Series (1977), two All-Star Games (1972 and 1980), three National League Championship Series (1973, 1976 and 1979), and the 1981 National League Division Series.

On April 25, 1985, Dale was released from the National League due to a knee injury. In May of that year, Dale filed a federal suit against the Major League Umpires Association, targeting Richie Phillips, the union's legal counsel and negotiator. Dale alleged that Phillips failed to respond to numerous attempts to acquire the union's legal and financial data. The suit also challenged the legality of a $120,000 assessment taken from the umpires after the 1984 World Series, with Dale claiming that the umpires had not given consent. Dale also appealed his dismissal from the NL in 1986, and won a disability settlement.

Dale was the home plate umpire for Rick Wise's no-hitter on June 25, 1971.

After his umpiring career ended, Dale became an adjunct professor of business and social science at Maryville College, Tennessee, as well as an African safari tour guide

== See also ==
- List of Major League Baseball umpires (disambiguation)
