= John Kibler =

American baseball umpire (1929–2010)

Kibler

John William Kibler (January 9, 1929 – February 18, 2010) was an umpire for the National League from 1965 to 1989. He wore uniform number 9 for most of his career.

== Early life ==
Kibler was born in Piseco, New York, on January 9, 1929. He served in the Navy during the Korean War and was a member of the New York State Police before becoming an umpire. He worked in the minors for six seasons in the Georgia–Florida League (1958), Pioneer League (1959), South Atlantic League (1960–1961), American Association (1962), and International League (1963).

== Major League Baseball career ==
He joined the National League full-time starting in 1965 after two partial seasons in 1963–64. He officiated in the 1981 National League Division Series, five National League Championship Series' (1972, 1975, 1979, 1984–Game 5 only, and 1987—crew chief), four World Series (1971, 1978, 1982, and 1986—crew chief), and four Major League Baseball All-Star Games (1965, 1974, 1980—crew chief, and 1985). He also umpired at the no-hitters of Ken Holtzman (1971, third base), Nolan Ryan's fifth no-hitter (1981, third base), Bob Forsch's second no-hitter (1983, second base), and Tom Browning's perfect game (1988, second base). He served as the home plate umpire for the Cardinals inaugural game at Busch Memorial Stadium on May 12, 1966.

=== 1986 World Series ===
Kibler was the crew chief of umpiring for the 1986 World Series. In Game 6, Kibler was umpiring first base when he made the call that New York Mets outfielder Mookie Wilson's dribbler was a fair ball as it went between the legs of Boston first baseman Bill Buckner, Kibler emphatically pointing "fair" as the ball went down the first base line. Kibler then umpired behind the plate for Game 7 when the Mets clinched their second World Series title in their history.

== Personal life ==
Kibler married Dorothy Venn in 1958 and had two sons, John Jr. and Jeffrey. Kibler died of a heart attack on February 18, 2010, in Palo Alto, California, at the age of 81.

== See also ==
- List of Major League Baseball umpires (disambiguation)
