= Satch Davidson =

American baseball umpire (1935-2010)

Davidson

David Leroy "Satch" Davidson (January 18, 1935 – August 21, 2010) was a Major League Baseball umpire in the National League from 1969 to 1984. During his career, Davidson was behind the plate for Hank Aaron's 715th home run which broke Babe Ruth's career record and he called the game in which Carlton Fisk hit a game-winning home run in game 6 of the 1975 World Series. Davidson wore uniform number 4 when the National League adopted umpire uniform numbers in 1970.

== Early life and career ==
Davidson was born on January 18, 1935, in London, Ohio, and attended Wilmington College and Ohio State University. His nickname came from his being a fan of the character "Sach" played by Huntz Hall in the 1940s films featuring The Bowery Boys. He played professional football and was a catcher in the minor leagues for the Columbus Jets in 1961 before becoming an umpire in the New York – Penn League in 1966 and in the Eastern League in the following two seasons.

== Major league career ==
Promoted to the National League in 1969 after only three years umpiring minor league baseball, Davidson was an umpire for the pair of no-hitters thrown on consecutive days during the first month of play that season at Crosley Field. Davidson was the first base umpire when Jim Maloney of the Cincinnati Reds no-hit the Houston Astros and on May 1 was behind the plate when Don Wilson pitched a no-hitter for the Astros against the Reds. He would be umpire for three other no-hitters during his career.

On April 8, 1974, in a game played at Atlanta–Fulton County Stadium, Davidson was the home plate umpire when Hank Aaron hit his record-breaking 715th home run, making sure he touched home plate as teammates came out of the dugout to congratulate him. He recalled that the stadium, which had been packed at the start of the game, was half empty by the seventh inning after the record was broken and said he "respected Hank because of the way he played and conducted himself" and that "it couldn't have happened to a nicer guy".

Davidson was home plate umpire during Game 6 of the 1975 World Series, with the Cincinnati Reds up three games to two over the Boston Red Sox in a game played at Fenway Park. The Reds had taken a 6–3 lead, but the Red Sox tied the game with a three-run home run by Bernie Carbo in the bottom of the seventh inning. The game went into extra innings and remained tied until the 12th inning when Carlton Fisk hit a pitch off of Pat Darcy of the Reds. In one of baseball's most iconic moments, Fisk waved his arms as if trying to keep the ball fair, before the ball hit the left field foul pole and was called a home run, winning the game for Boston. Davidson was the one who called it a home run, saying he had a better view of the ball than the umpires at third base and in left field.

Davidson was an umpire at the 1976 Major League Baseball All-Star Game and for the 1982 World Series, in addition to being part of the umpiring crew for the National League Championship Series in 1971, 1974, and 1978 and the National League West Division Series in 1981. Davidson also officiated on April 17, 1976, when Mike Schmidt hit four home runs in one game. He retired from baseball in 1985, citing back problems.

== Personal life ==
During the baseball offseason, Davidson was a police officer in his home town of London, Ohio. Davidson also spent 21 years as an NCAA basketball referee. He was inducted into the Texas Baseball Hall of Fame in 2005.

A resident of Houston for 27 years, Davidson died there at age 75 on August 21, 2010. He was survived by his wife, Lynn, as well as by three daughters, a son and five grandchildren.
