= Charlie Williams (umpire) =

American baseball umpire (1943–2005)

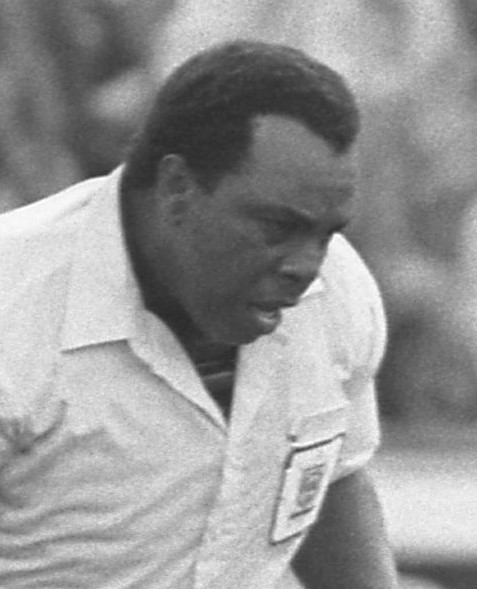
Williams in 1986

Charles Herman Williams (December 20, 1943 – September 10, 2005) was an American baseball umpire who officiated in the National League from 1978 to 1999, and in both leagues from 2000 to 2001. He was the fourth African American to serve as a full-time MLB umpire, and in 1985 became the first Black umpire of the Major League Baseball All-Star Game. In 1993 he became the first African American umpire to work behind home plate in a World Series game. He wore uniform number 25.

== Early life and education ==
Williams was born in Denver, Colorado. He attended George Washington High School, and became an All-America football player at Long Beach City College. He later attended California State University, Los Angeles.

== Career ==
In his rookie season, Williams umpired third base for Tom Seaver's only no-hitter on June 16, 1978.

Williams was the only umpire to eject Steve Garvey from a game, which occurred during the 1986 season and received media coverage for the incident.

Williams was the first base umpire in a 1990 game between the Mets and Braves, when he was involved in a well-known incident. With two Braves on base, Met pitcher David Cone induced a chopper from Mark Lemke, fielded by Gregg Jefferies, who threw to Cone at first base. Williams mistakenly ruled Lemke safe. Cone argued vociferously with Williams while still holding the ball (Cone thought time had been called), and both Braves runners scored while Cone was distracted.

Williams was the home plate umpire for one of the longest games in World Series history, Game 4 of the 1993 World Series between the Philadelphia Phillies and Toronto Blue Jays at Veterans Stadium, which lasted 4 hours and 14 minutes and ended with a 15–14 Toronto victory and a 3–1 Series lead for the Blue Jays.

He was the first base umpire on June 3, 1995, when Pedro Martínez pitched 9 perfect innings before giving up a hit in the 10th.

In 1999, he was shoved by Mets third base coach Cookie Rojas after Rojas disputed Williams' "foul ball" call on a ball hit down the line by outfielder Darryl Hamilton. Rojas was suspended for five games.

He also worked the All-Star games in 1985 and 1995, the 1989 National League Championship Series between the San Francisco Giants and the Chicago Cubs, the 1997 NLCS between the Florida Marlins and the Atlanta Braves, and the 1999 National League Division Series. He ejected San Diego Padres first baseman Steve Garvey from a June, 1986 game between the Padres and the Atlanta Braves, the only ejection of Garvey's career, then ejected Padres manager Steve Boros the next day when Boros tried to present a videotape of the call Williams ejected Garvey over. He was also an umpire on September 28, 1988, when Orel Hershiser set the Major League record for consecutive scoreless innings pitched. He remained an umpire until his retirement in 2001 due to health problems, and died at age 61 in Chicago, Illinois, after a long illness related to diabetes and kidney failure.

== See also ==
- List of Major League Baseball umpires (disambiguation)
