= Jerry Reuss =

American baseball player (born 1949)

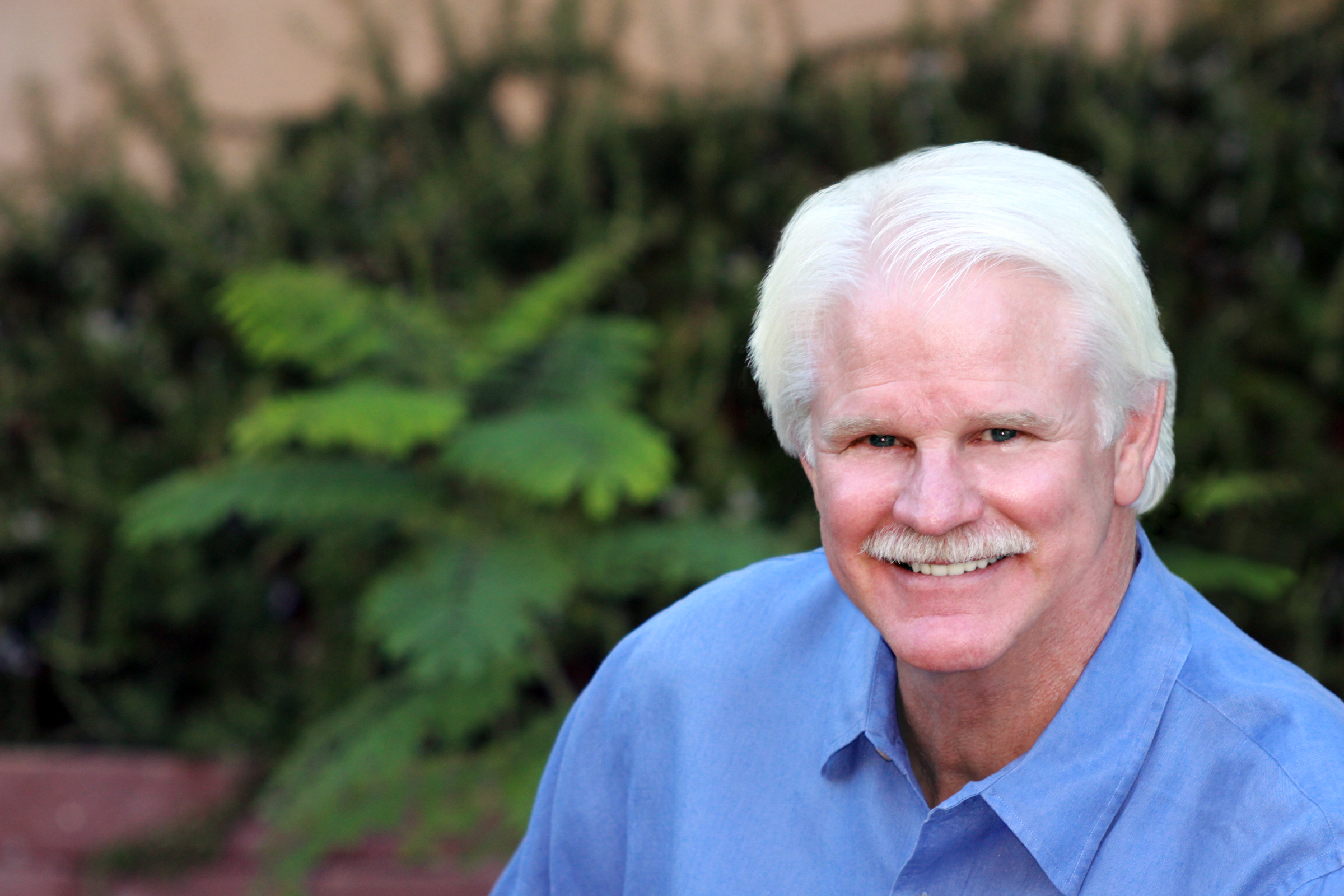
- Reuss in 2009
- Pitcher
- Born: June 19, 1949 (age 77); St. Louis, Missouri, U.S.
- Batted: Left Threw: Left

MLB debut
- September 27, 1969, for the St. Louis Cardinals

Last MLB appearance
- October 3, 1990, for the Pittsburgh Pirates

MLB statistics
- Win–loss record: 220–191
- Earned run average: 3.64
- Strikeouts: 1,907
- Stats at Baseball Reference

Teams
- St. Louis Cardinals (1969–1971); Houston Astros (1972–1973); Pittsburgh Pirates (1974–1978); Los Angeles Dodgers (1979–1987); Cincinnati Reds (1987); California Angels (1987); Chicago White Sox (1988–1989); Milwaukee Brewers (1989); Pittsburgh Pirates (1990)

Career highlights and awards
- 2× All-Star (1975, 1980); World Series champion (1981); Pitched a no-hitter on June 27, 1980

Jerry Reuss (ROYCE; born June 19, 1949) is an American former left-handed pitcher in Major League Baseball, best known for his years with the Los Angeles Dodgers.

Reuss played for eight teams in his major league career; along with the Dodgers (1979–87), he played for the St. Louis Cardinals (1969–71), Houston Astros (1972–73), and Pittsburgh Pirates (1974–78). At the end of his career (1987–90), he played for the Cincinnati Reds, California Angels, Chicago White Sox, Milwaukee Brewers, and the Pirates again (Reuss is one of only two Pirates to have played for Danny Murtaugh, Chuck Tanner, and Jim Leyland, the other being John Candelaria). With the Dodgers, he won the 1981 World Series over the New York Yankees. In 1988 he became the second pitcher in history, joining Milt Pappas, to win 200 career games without ever winning 20 in a single season (a feat later matched by: Frank Tanana, Charlie Hough, Dennis Martínez, Chuck Finley, Kenny Rogers, Tim Wakefield and Zack Greinke).

== Early life ==
Reuss was born on June 19, 1949, in St. Louis, Missouri. As a child, he dreamed of playing baseball for the St. Louis Cardinals. He attended Ritenour High School in Overland, Missouri, where he played baseball and basketball. In both 1966 and 1967, he led Ritenour to the Missouri state baseball championship. He also played American Legion baseball.

He signed a letter of intent to attend Southern Illinois University (SIU), but once he was drafted by the St. Louis Cardinals, he followed his American Legion coach's advice to sign with them if they offered him a contract in the belief Reuss could become a major league pitcher. He still attended SIU, which allowed him to receive a draft deferment during the Vietnam War.

== Career ==
=== St. Louis Cardinals (1967-71) ===
Reuss was drafted in the second round of the 1967 Major League Baseball draft by the Cardinals, with the 30th overall selection. Only 18-years old, he spent the majority of 1967 pitching for the Single-A Cedar Rapids Cardinals in the Cardinal's minor league system. He had a 2–5 won–loss record in nine starts, but an excellent 1.86 earned run average (ERA). He played the 1968 season for the Double-A Arkansas Travelers, with a 7–8 record, but again with an excellent ERA (2.17). In 1969, he was promoted to the Triple-A Tulsa Oilers, where he had his first winning record (13–11), but a 4.06 ERA, striking out 151 batters in 186 innings pitched.

He was called up to the St. Louis Cardinals for the first time in 1969. Reuss won his first Major League game in 1969, a 2–1 victory over the Montreal Expos, pitching seven innings without giving up a run; and became part of the starting rotation in 1970. In 1970, he played a portion of the season in Tulsa (7–2 with a 2.12 ERA), and was called up to the Cardinals where he started 20 games (going 7–8 with a 4.10 ERA). He played a full season for the Cardinals in 1971, starting 35 games, with a 14–14 record and 4.78 ERA. During his time with the Cardinals he started 56 games, with a 22–22 record and 4.43 ERA.

=== Houston Astros (1972-73) ===
In the spring of 1972, Reuss wanted a raise from $17,000 to $25,000. Cardinals general manager Bing Devine, under owner Gussie Busch's directive, was unwilling to give more than $20,000. Reuss also grew a mustache that raised Busch's ire. When Reuss refused to bend on the salary issue, Busch directed Devine to "get rid of him". Devine then traded Reuss to the Astros for Scipio Spinks and Lance Clemons on April 15, 1972. Reuss said that Devine later told him the chief reason he was traded was because Busch disapproved of Reuss's blond mustache, and not chiefly Reuss's negotiation style. The trade was crushing for Reuss because of his lifelong feelings about wanting to play for his hometown Cardinals.

The trade looked like a fairly even swap at the time. While Spinks had shuttled between Houston and their top minor league affiliate, the Oklahoma City 89ers, over the last three years, he had been almost unhittable during his minor league stints.

Spinks had pitched well in Single-A baseball in 1968, but with the Triple-A 89ers in 1969 he was 7–11 with a 5.48 ERA, 9–12 with a 3.30 ERA in 1970, and 9–6 with a 3.25 ERA in 1971. He played in 10 games for the Astros in 1970-71. In trading Spinks, Astros manager Harry Walker thought Spinks could win six-eight games a season, while Reuss had the potential to win 14-18 games a year. Spinks had an excellent start with the Cardinals in 1972, but never recovered from a freak knee injury he suffered on July 4, 1972. Although a pitcher, Spinks was used as a pinch runner because of his speed. He ran through his third-base coach's signal to stop at third base, racing towards home plate where he collided with catcher Johnny Bench, tearing knee ligaments. Spinks needed knee surgery, and then needed shoulder surgery in 1973 because of a sore arm, which would be his last major league season. He was out of baseball by 1976.

During his two seasons with the Astros, Reuss was 9–13 with a 4.17 ERA in 1972, but in 1973, he improved to 16–13 with a 3.74 ERA, tied for 7th best in the National League for wins. Reuss tied for the league lead in games started (40) and walks allowed with 117 in 1973.

=== Pittsburgh Pirates (1974-78) ===
After the 1973 season, the Astros traded Reuss to the Pirates for Milt May. After the October 31, 1973 trade, Reuss responded, "I'm surprised because the Astros received only a second‐string catcher for me. I thought I was worth more than Milt May." In the offseason, he attended the University of California, Santa Barbara.

In his first three seasons with the Pirates (1974-76) he had winning records, 16–11, 18–11, and 14–9, respectively. Reuss was the starting pitcher for the Pirates in game 1 of the 1974 National League Championship Series against the Los Angeles Dodgers. He pitched well, allowing one run in seven innings, but the Pirates lost to Don Sutton and the Dodgers 3-0. With the Pirates facing elimination in game 4, Reuss again started against Sutton but did not fare so well, allowing 3 runs in 2 2/3 innings in a game the Pirates eventually lost, 12-1. In 1975, in addition to his Pirates best won-loss record, he had a 2.54 ERA, and was selected to play on the NL All-Star team. Reuss was named starting pitcher for All-Star Game, and pitched three innings, without allowing a run. He was 23rd in Most Valuable Player (MVP) voting that year. He was fourth best in the league for most wins and in ERA.

Reuss had a down year in 1977 (10–13 with a 4.11 ERA), and had shoulder problems which limited his availability in 1978. The Pirates traded him to the Los Angeles Dodgers for pitcher Rick Rhoden before the start of the 1979 season.

=== Los Angeles Dodgers (1979-86) ===
Reuss was 7–14 with a 3.54 ERA for the Dodgers in 1979, but in 1980 Reuss had one of the best seasons of his career. He had 18 wins and only six losses, a 2.51 ERA (fourth best in the major leagues) and led the majors in shutouts with six. He also threw a no-hitter against the San Francisco Giants on June 27, striking out only two batters, narrowly missing a perfect game due to a throwing error in the first inning by shortstop Bill Russell. Reuss's no-hitter is just one of ten in baseball history in which a pitcher did not walk or hit a batter, but whose perfect game bid was foiled by a fielding error. Reuss finished second behind Steve Carlton in the running for the Cy Young Award, and won the Sporting News Comeback Player of the Year Award. He was also selected for the second time to the NL All-Star Team and struck out all three batters he faced in that year's game, earning the win.

In 1981 Reuss went 10–4 with a career-low 2.30 ERA in a strike-shortened season. He defeated Nolan Ryan and the Houston Astros 4–0 in the deciding game five of the NL West Division Series, throwing a complete game five-hitter. He lost Game 3 of the 1981 National League Championship Series to the Montreal Expos, and went 1–1 in two games against the New York Yankees in the 1981 World Series, helping the Dodgers win the title. In his Game 5 victory over the Yankees, Reuss pitched a complete game five-hitter, allowing only one run in a 2–1 victory over Ron Guidry.

In 1982, Reuss was 18–11 with a 3.11 ERA. On June 11, 1982, Jerry Reuss recorded 27 consecutive outs in a game, with only the opponent's leadoff batter reaching base (double by Reds' Eddie Milner, who reached third on a sacrifice bunt and scored on a fielder's choice).

Reuss had two more winning seasons with the Dodgers before injuries took their toll. His last good season with the Dodgers was in 1985 (14–10, 2.92 ERA), but in 1986, at age 37, he suffered a sore elbow requiring surgery after a dismal start to the season (2–6 with a 5.84 ERA). Reuss was released at the beginning of the 1987 season. In his time with the Dodgers, Reuss had a 86–69 record with a 3.11 ERA, and five seasons of winning 10 or more games.

=== Final playing years ===
He then played for the Reds, going 0–5 before getting released again, and then for the Angels before becoming a free agent. Reuss then signed with the Chicago White Sox on March 29, 1988, leading White Sox pitchers with a 13–9 season, and earning his 200th career win that year. He was acquired by the Milwaukee Brewers, in need of a veteran fifth starter for its pennant drive, from the White Sox for Brian Drahman at the trade deadline on July 31, 1989. Reuss retired following the 1990 season.

During these last years, he took extensive photographs of the stadiums in which he played, which proved to be a popular collection.

== Broadcasting career ==
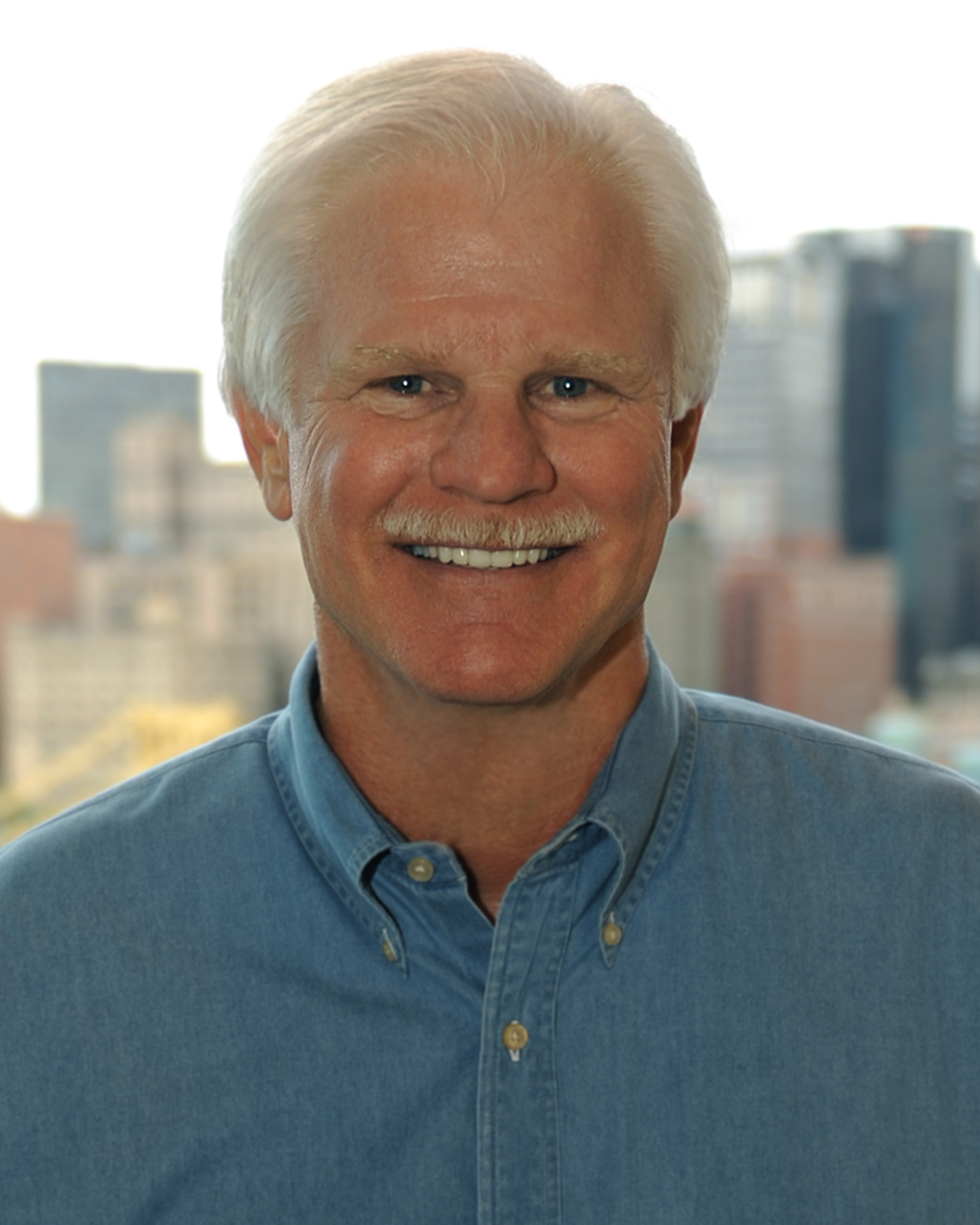
Reuss in September 2008

Reuss became a baseball broadcaster, working nationally for ESPN from 1991 to 1993, and The Baseball Network in 1995. He was also a color commentator for the California/Anaheim Angels from 1996 to 1998. He served as a pitching coach with the minor league Iowa Cubs (2001-03) before returning to broadcasting with the Dodgers from 2006 to 2008, serving as a color commentator alongside Rick Monday.

Jerry has also broadcast for the Las Vegas Stars (1994, 1995, and 1999), the Las Vegas 51's (2005–2018), and the Las Vegas Aviators (2019-current).

== Honors ==
On January 31, 2016, Jerry was inducted into the Missouri Sports Hall of Fame located in Springfield, Missouri. Jerry was inducted into the St. Louis Sports Hall of Fame on May 23, 2019.

== Personal life ==
In 2014, Reuss's autobiography, Bring In the Right Hander!, was published by University of Nebraska Press. Library Journal called Reuss "a gifted storyteller" who describes "what it's like to be both an aspiring teenage ballplayer newly signed to a contract and a 40-year-old athlete clinging to the baseball life he loves so much."

== See also ==
- List of Houston Astros team records
- List of Los Angeles Dodgers no-hitters
- List of Major League Baseball annual shutout leaders
- List of Major League Baseball career games started leaders
- List of Major League Baseball career innings pitched leaders
- List of Major League Baseball career strikeout leaders
- List of Major League Baseball career wins leaders
- List of Major League Baseball no-hitters
- List of Major League Baseball players who played in four decades
- Los Angeles Dodgers award winners and league leaders

Preceded by Ken Forsch	No-hitter pitcher June 27, 1980	Succeeded by Charlie Lea
Preceded by Fernando Valenzuela	Los Angeles Dodgers Opening Day; Starting pitcher 1982	Succeeded by Fernando Valenzuela
