= Ed Montague (umpire) =

American baseball umpire (born 1948)

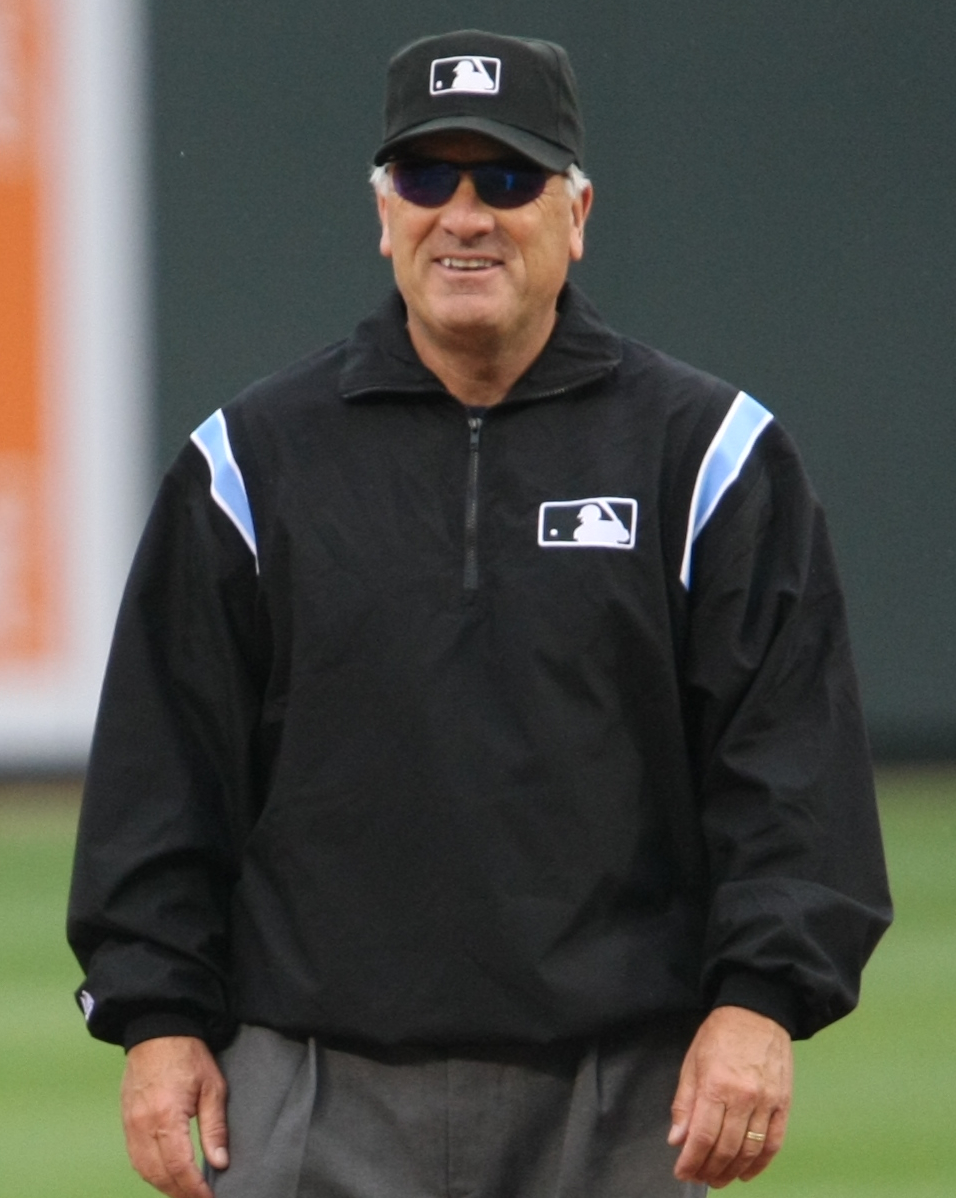
- Montague in 2008
- Born: November 3, 1948 (age 77); San Francisco, California, U.S.
- Occupations: Former MLB umpire Umpire supervisor
- Years active: 1974–2009
- Height: 5 ft 11 in (1.80 m)

Edward Michael Montague (born November 3, 1948) is an American former umpire in Major League Baseball. He worked in the National League in 1974 and from 1976 to 1999, and officiated throughout both leagues between 2000 and 2009. The most senior active umpire in the major leagues at the time of his retirement, he wore uniform number 11 throughout his career. His 4,369 total games ranked eighth in major league history when he retired, and he is one of only three umpires to serve as crew chief for the World Series four times.

== Career ==
Montague was born in San Francisco, California. He umpired the World Series in 1986, 1991, 1997, 2000, 2004 and 2007, serving as crew chief on the last four occasions; only Bill Klem (9 times) and Bill Summers (4 times) held the position of World Series crew chief as often. Montague also umpired in the All-Star Game in 1982, 1990, 1998 and 2004, calling balls and strikes for the last three contests. He is only the fourth umpire in history—joining Bill McGowan, Summers and Al Barlick—to serve as crew chief for three World Series and as home plate umpire for three All-Star Games. In 2004, he became the first umpire to work behind the plate for the entire All-Star Game and serve as crew chief in the World Series in the same season.

Montague also umpired in seven League Championship Series (1979, 1987, 1992, 1996, 1999, 2001, 2002), and in seven Division Series (1981, 1995, 2000, 2003, 2004, 2005, 2007). He was the first base umpire for the single-game playoff to decide the NL's 2007 wild card team. He became an NL crew chief in 1996 after the death of longtime umpire John McSherry on Opening Day at Riverfront Stadium in Cincinnati.

Montague was known for his quick flick of the wrist on a called strike, and his quick punchout on called third strikes to left-handed hitters. Montague umpired few games during the 2009 season due to injury, and he announced his retirement in February 2010. As of 2018, Montague is a supervisor of MLB umpires.

=== Notable games ===
On May 28, 2006, Montague was umpiring second base when Barry Bonds hit his 715th home run to pass Babe Ruth for second place on the all-time list.

In early 2008, Montague ejected Los Angeles Dodgers third-base coach Larry Bowa after Bowa refused to heed Montague's warnings not to move in front of the coach's box toward the playing field. Bowa was suspended three games for "inappropriate and aggressive conduct." Montague called the situation, "One of the dumbest ejections I've ever had."

== Personal life ==
Montague's father, also named Ed Montague, was a major league player and scout.

Montague has a son also named Ed who played in Minor League Baseball and independent baseball from 2002 through 2008. Another son, Brett, played college baseball for Colorado State University-Pueblo.

== See also ==
- List of Major League Baseball umpires (disambiguation)
