= 1981 Cincinnati Reds season =

1981 Cincinnati Reds
- League: National League
- Division: West
- Ballpark: Riverfront Stadium
- City: Cincinnati
- Record: 66–42 (.611)
- Divisional place: 1st
- Owners: William & James Williams
- General managers: Dick Wagner
- Managers: John McNamara
- Television: WLWT (Ray Lane, Bill Brown, Dick Carlson)
- Radio: WLW (Marty Brennaman, Joe Nuxhall)

The 1981 Cincinnati Reds season was the 112th season for the franchise in Major League Baseball, and their 12th and 11th full season at Riverfront Stadium. The Reds finished with an overall record of 66–42, giving them the best win–loss record in all of Major League Baseball. However, due to a split-season format caused by a mid-season players' strike, they failed to make the MLB playoffs because they did not finish first in either half of the season; they finished in second place in both halves by scant margins. The Reds finished the first half of the season in second place with a record of 35–21, just one-half game behind the eventual world champion Los Angeles Dodgers, and one-and-a-half games behind the Houston Astros in the second half, in which the Reds were 31–21, good for second place, again. Before the final game of the season against the Atlanta Braves, the team unveiled a banner which said "Cincinnati Reds: Baseball's best record 1981". The Reds were managed by John McNamara and played their home games at Riverfront Stadium.

== Offseason ==
- January 22, 1981: Mike Grace and John Hale were traded by the Reds to the Baltimore Orioles for Joe Kerrigan and John Buffamoyer (minors).

== Regular season ==
=== Season standings ===
NL West
Team	W	L	Pct.	GB	Home	Road
Cincinnati Reds	66	42	.611	—	32‍–‍22	34‍–‍20
Los Angeles Dodgers	63	47	.573	4	33‍–‍23	30‍–‍24
Houston Astros	61	49	.555	6	31‍–‍20	30‍–‍29
San Francisco Giants	56	55	.505	11½	29‍–‍24	27‍–‍31
Atlanta Braves	50	56	.472	15	22‍–‍27	28‍–‍29
San Diego Padres	41	69	.373	26	20‍–‍35	21‍–‍34

NL West First Half Standings	W	L	Pct.	GB
Los Angeles Dodgers	36	21	.632	—
Cincinnati Reds	35	21	.625	1/2
Houston Astros	28	29	.491	8
Atlanta Braves	25	29	.463	9 1/2
San Francisco Giants	27	32	.458	10
San Diego Padres	23	33	.411	12 1/2

NL West Second Half Standings	W	L	Pct.	GB
Houston Astros	33	20	.623	—
Cincinnati Reds	31	21	.596	1 1/2
San Francisco Giants	29	23	.558	3 1/2
Los Angeles Dodgers	27	26	.509	6
Atlanta Braves	25	27	.481	7 1/2
San Diego Padres	18	36	.333	15 1/2

=== Record vs. opponents ===
1981 National League record Sources:
Team	ATL	CHC	CIN	HOU	LAD	MON	NYM	PHI	PIT	SD	SF	STL
Atlanta	—	3–2–1	6–5	4–8	7–7	3–7	3–3	4–5	2–3	9–6	5–7	4–3
Chicago	2–3–1	—	1–5	1–6	6–4	4–7	5–8–1	2–10	4–10	3–3	5–5	5–4–1
Cincinnati	5–6	5–1	—	8–4	8–8	5–4	7–3	5–2	4–2	10–2	9–5	0–5
Houston	8–4	6–1	4–8	—	4–8	5–2	6–3	4–6	2–4	11–3	9–6	2–4
Los Angeles	7–7	4–6	8–8	8–4	—	5–2	5–1	3–3	5–1	6–5	7–5	5–5
Montreal	7–3	7–4	4–5	2–5	2–5	—	9–3	7–4	10–3	4–2	2–5	6–9
New York	3–3	8–5–1	3–7	3–6	1–5	3–9	—	7–7	3–6–1	2–5	2–4	6–5
Philadelphia	5-4	10–2	2–5	6–4	3–3	4–7	7–7	—	7–5	4–2	4–3	7–6
Pittsburgh	3–2	10–4	2–4	4–2	1–5	3–10	6–3–1	5–7	—	6–4	3–7	3–8
San Diego	6–9	3–3	2–10	3–11	5–6	2–4	5–2	2–4	4–6	—	6–7	3–7
San Francisco	7–5	5–5	5–9	6–9	5–7	5–2	4–2	3–4	7–3	7–6	—	2–3
St. Louis	3–4	4–5–1	5–0	4–2	5–5	9–6	5–6	6–7	8–3	7–3	3–2	—

=== Notable transactions ===
- June 8, 1981: Terry McGriff was drafted by the Cincinnati Reds in the 8th round of the 1981 amateur draft. Player signed June 12, 1981.
- June 8, 1981: Paul O'Neill was drafted by the Cincinnati Reds in the 4th round of the 1981 amateur draft. Player signed June 11, 1981.
- September 10, 1981: Doug Bair was traded by the Reds to the St. Louis Cardinals for Joe Edelen and Neil Fiala.

=== Roster ===
1981 Cincinnati Reds roster
Roster
Pitchers: 40 Doug Bair; 38 Bruce Berenyi; 53 Scott Brown; 37 Geoff Combe; 40 Joe Edelen; 47 Tom Hume; 51 Mike LaCoss; 44 Charlie Leibrandt; 31 Paul Moskau; 35 Frank Pastore; 49 Joe Price; 41 Tom Seaver; 36 Mario Soto	Catchers: 17 Joe Nolan; 9 Mike O'Berry; Infielders: 5 Johnny Bench; 33 Larry Biittner; 13 Dave Concepción; 22 Dan Driessen; 26 Junior Kennedy; 25 Ray Knight; 7 Rafael Landestoy; 16 Ron Oester; 12 Harry Spilman	Outfielders: 29 Dave Collins; 15 George Foster; 30 Ken Griffey; 21 Paul Householder; 28 Sam Mejías; 20 Eddie Milner; 23 Mike Vail; Other batters: 12 Germán Barranca; 19 Neil Fiala	Manager: 3 John McNamara; Coaches: 4 Harry Dunlop; 6 Bill Fischer; 2 Russ Nixon; 11 Ron Plaza

=== Game log ===
==== First half ====
1981 First half game log: 35–21 (Home: 17–11; Away: 18–10)
April: 11–7 (Home: 4–4; Away: 7–3)

#	Date	Opponent	Score	Win	Loss	Save	Attendance	Record	Streak
1	April 8	Phillies	3–2	Hume (1–0)	Lyle (0–1)		51,716	1–0	W1
2	April 10	@ Braves	3–5	Garber (1–0)	Soto (0–1)	Camp (1)	34,929	1–1	L1
3	April 11	@ Braves	3–2	Bair (1–0)	Garber (1–1)		15,973	2–1	W1
4	April 12	@ Braves	2–3	Bradford (1–0)	Hume (1–1)	Mahler (1)	12,227	2–2	L1
5	April 13	@ Padres	7–1	Seaver (1–0)	Wise (0–1)		36,391	3–2	W1
6	April 14	@ Padres	4–0	Berenyi (1–0)	Curtis (0–1)		12,198	4–2	W2
7	April 15	@ Padres	10–1	Soto (1–1)	Mura (0–1)		10,801	5–2	W3
8	April 17	Cardinals	5–9	Sorensen (2–0)	LaCoss (0–1)		22,961	5–3	L1
9	April 18	Cardinals	4–10	Shirley (1–0)	Seaver (1–1)		22,529	5–4	L2
10	April 21	Braves	1–10	Boggs (1–1)	Soto (1–2)		24,022	5–5	L3
11	April 22	Braves	3–7	Perry (1–1)	LaCoss (0–2)		15,735	5–6	L4
12	April 23	@ Astros	5–4 (10)	Price (1–0)	D. Smith (0–2)	Moskau (1)	23,173	6–6	W1
13	April 24	@ Astros	3–0	Pastore (1–0)	Niekro (1–3)		27,087	7–6	W2
14	April 25	@ Astros	2–1	Berenyi (2–0)	Ryan (1–1)	Hume (1)	19,957	8–6	W3
15	April 26	@ Astros	0–1	Knepper (2–0)	Soto (1–3)		23,428	8–7	L1
16	April 28	Padres	11–2	Seaver (2–1)	Lollar (1–1)		13,103	9–7	W1
17	April 29	Padres	8–5	Moskau (1–0)	Littlefield (0–2)	Hume (2)	12,291	10–7	W2
18	April 30	Padres	4–3	LaCoss (1–2)	Mura (0–3)	Hume (3)	12,794	11–7	W3

May: 16–13 (Home: 10–7; Away: 6–6)

#	Date	Opponent	Score	Win	Loss	Save	Attendance	Record	Streak
19	May 1	@ Cardinals	6–7	Forsch (2–1)	Soto (1–4)	Sutter (5)	21,315	11–8	L1
20	May 2	@ Cardinals	3–7	Shirley (3–0)	Berenyi (2–1)		16,677	11–9	L2
21	May 3	@ Cardinals	4–5 (11)	Edelen (1–0)	Hume (1–2)		21,855	11–10	L3
—	May 5	Pirates	Postponed (rain); Makeup: May 7						
22	May 6	Pirates	9–8	Hume (2–2)	Jackson (1–2)		14,551	12–10	W1
23	May 7	Pirates	1–3	Rhoden (4–0)	Soto (1–5)	Romo (3)	–	12–11	L1
24	May 7	Pirates	1–7	Solomon (2–1)	LaCoss (1–3)		20,301	12–12	L2
25	May 8	Astros	4–0	Seaver (3–1)	Sutton (2–4)		31,961	13–12	W1
26	May 9	Astros	9–5	Berenyi (3–1)	Andújar (1–2)		30,860	14–12	W2
27	May 10	Astros	5–7	Niekro (3–3)	Pastore (1–1)	LaCorte (2)	31,903	14–13	L1
28	May 11	Astros	0–5	Ryan (2–1)	LaCoss (1–4)		11,795	14–14	L2
29	May 12	Cubs	2–1	Soto (2–5)	Tidrow (1–4)		12,016	15–14	W1
30	May 13	Cubs	8–3	Seaver (4–1)	Krukow (1–3)		12,528	16–14	W2
31	May 14	Cubs	6–1	Berenyi (4–1)	Reuschel (1–4)		11,098	17–14	W3
32	May 15	@ Pirates	4–1	Price (2–0)	Romo (0–2)	Hume (4)	10,592	18–14	W4
33	May 16	@ Pirates	4–0	LaCoss (2–4)	Scurry (1–2)		11,890	19–14	W5
34	May 17	@ Pirates	4–3	Soto (3–5)	Solomon (2–3)		11,775	20–14	W6
35	May 19	@ Cubs	5–0	Seaver (5–1)	Reuschel (1–5)	Moskau (2)	5,896	21–14	W7
36	May 20	@ Cubs	10–7	Price (3–0)	Smith (1–3)	Hume (5)	5,914	22–14	W8
37	May 21	@ Cubs	1–5	Martz (2–2)	Pastore (1–2)		7,132	22–15	L1
38	May 22	Dodgers	2–4 (12)	Stewart (2–0)	Bair (1–1)		27,943	22–16	L2
39	May 23	Dodgers	6–9 (10)	Stewart (3–0)	Moskau (1–1)	Castillo (4)	40,928	22–17	L3
40	May 24	Dodgers	3–2	Moskau (2–1)	Welch (2–3)	Price (1)	–	23–17	W1
41	May 24	Dodgers	3–10	Castillo (1–4)	Berenyi (4–2)		36,113	23–18	L1
42	May 25	Giants	6–3	Combe (1–0)	Holland (3–2)		15,684	24–18	W1
—	May 26	Giants	Postponed (rain); Makeup: August 14						
43	May 27	Giants	3–2	Soto (4–5)	Alexander (5–3)		12,223	25–18	W2
44	May 28	Giants	7–4	Price (4–0)	Lavelle (0–3)		20,077	26–18	W3
45	May 29	@ Dodgers	2–5	Welch (3–3)	LaCoss (2–5)	Howe (5)	45,749	26–19	L1
46	May 30	@ Dodgers	9–1	Pastore (2–2)	Hooton (7–1)		43,582	27–19	W1
47	May 31	@ Dodgers	4–16	Goltz (1–0)	Soto (4–6)		46,411	27–20	L1

June: 8–1 (Home: 3–0; Away: 5–1)

#	Date	Opponent	Score	Win	Loss	Save	Attendance	Record	Streak
48	June 1	@ Giants	8–5	Hume (3–2)	Minton (2–3)		4,620	28–20	W1
49	June 2	@ Giants	7–15	Whitson (2–5)	LaCoss (2–6)	Holland (4)	19,007	28–21	L1
50	June 3	@ Giants	6–2	Pastore (3–2)	Blue (5–4)		7,114	29–21	W1
51	June 5	Expos	6–3	Soto (5–6)	Rogers (6–4)		21,298	30–21	W2
52	June 6	Expos	9–3	Seaver (6–1)	Lea (4–3)		26,016	31–21	W3
53	June 7	Expos	2–0	Berenyi (5–2)	Burris (3–5)		40,010	32–21	W4
54	June 9	@ Mets	8–4	Hume (4–2)	Falcone (1–3)		12,313	33–21	W5
55	June 10	@ Mets	2–0	Soto (6–6)	Jones (1–7)		9,732	34–21	W6
56	June 11	@ Mets	5–2	Seaver (7–1)	Zachry (5–7)		18,612	35–21	W7

==== Second half ====
1981 Second half game log: 31–21 (Home: 15–11; Away: 16–10)
August: 10–10 (Home: 7–4; Away: 3–6)

#	Date	Opponent	Score	Win	Loss	Save	Attendance	Record	Streak
ASG	August 9	All-Star Game	AL 4–5 NL	Blue (1–0)	Fingers (0–1)	Sutter (1)	72,086		
57	August 10	@ Dodgers	0–4	Reuss (6–2)	Pastore (3–3)	Howe (6)	35,120	35–22	L1
58	August 11	@ Dodgers	7–6	Brown (1–0)	Forster (0–1)	Hume (6)	45,817	36–22	W1
59	August 12	@ Dodgers	5–8	Stewart (4–1)	Seaver (7–2)	Howe (7)	36,494	36–23	L1
60	August 14	Giants	0–4	Whitson (3–5)	Berenyi (5–3)		–	36–24	L2
61	August 14	Giants	7–6 (10)	Hume (5–2)	Holland (3–4)		22,404	37–24	W1
62	August 15	Giants	2–5	Alexander (6–4)	Pastore (3–4)	Minton (11)	20,671	37–25	L1
63	August 16	Giants	2–1	Soto (7–6)	Griffin (5–6)	Hume (7)	20,309	38–25	W1
64	August 18	Phillies	3–1	Seaver (8–2)	Carlton (9–3)	Hume (8)	25,363	39–25	W2
65	August 19	Phillies	6–3	Hume (6–2)	Lyle (5–2)		23,133	40–25	W3
66	August 21	Mets	2–0	Soto (8–6)	Zachry (6–8)		20,410	41–25	W4
67	August 22	Mets	4–7	Boitano (1–0)	Pastore (3–5)	Allen (11)	25,949	41–26	L1
68	August 23	Mets	2–3 (10)	Allen (5–3)	Hume (6–3)		20,761	41–27	L2
69	August 24	Mets	2–0	Berenyi (6–3)	Scott (3–7)		19,506	42–27	W1
70	August 25	@ Expos	1–9	Sanderson (7–4)	LaCoss (2–7)		40,162	42–28	L1
71	August 26	@ Expos	0–6	Gullickson (4–6)	Soto (8–7)		23,126	42–29	L2
72	August 27	@ Expos	0–12	Burris (6–5)	Pastore (3–6)		30,874	42–30	L3
73	August 28	@ Mets	5–2	Seaver (9–2)	Allen (5–4)		23,061	43–30	W1
74	August 29	@ Mets	2–3	Scott (4–7)	Berenyi (6–4)	Allen (13)	44,598	43–31	L1
75	August 30	@ Mets	6–3	LaCoss (3–7)	Harris (2–4)		18,770	44–31	W1
76	August 31	Expos	9–8	Bair (2–1)	Lee (2–4)		20,506	45–31	W2

September: 20–8 (Home: 7–4; Away: 13–4)

#	Date	Opponent	Score	Win	Loss	Save	Attendance	Record	Streak
77	September 1	Expos	3–4	Lea (5–4)	Price (4–1)	Reardon (4)	15,978	45–32	L1
78	September 2	Expos	7–0	Seaver (10–2)	Bahnsen (2–1)		12,926	46–32	W1
79	September 3	@ Phillies	9–3	Berenyi (7–4)	M. Davis (0–3)		26,540	47–32	W2
80	September 4	@ Phillies	6–7	Lyle (7–4)	Bair (2–2)	McGraw (9)	25,020	47–33	L1
81	September 5	@ Phillies	4–5	R. Reed (3–1)	Soto (8–8)		41,845	47–34	L2
82	September 6	@ Phillies	5–4	Hume (7–3)	Lyle (7–5)	Price (2)	30,366	48–34	W1
83	September 7	Padres	8–7	Seaver (11–2)	Show (0–1)	Price (3)	14,443	49–34	W2
84	September 8	Padres	1–6	Eichelberger (7–6)	Berenyi (7–5)		11,739	49–35	L1
85	September 9	Padres	5–4	Hume (8–3)	Urrea (2–2)		16,328	50–35	W1
86	September 11	Dodgers	3–2 (10)	Price (5–1)	Peña (1–1)		25,237	51–35	W2
87	September 12	Dodgers	6–5 (11)	LaCoss (4–7)	Power (0–1)		34,090	52–35	W3
88	September 13	Dodgers	2–4	Castillo (2–4)	Pastore (3–7)	Stewart (5)	27,858	52–36	L1
89	September 14	@ Astros	4–2	Berenyi (8–5)	Ruhle (3–4)		19,742	53–36	W1
90	September 15	@ Astros	4–0	Leibrandt (1–0)	Ryan (8–5)		16,354	54–36	W2
91	September 16	@ Giants	7–12	Breining (4–2)	Soto (8–9)		4,168	54–37	L1
92	September 17	@ Giants	1–0 (10)	Seaver (12–2)	Holland (6–5)	Hume (9)	4,721	55–37	W1
93	September 18	@ Dodgers	5–4	Price (6–1)	Stewart (4–3)	Hume (10)	44,258	56–37	W2
94	September 19	@ Dodgers	7–3	Edelen (2–0)	Hooton (10–6)		48,352	57–37	W3
95	September 20	@ Dodgers	5–1	Soto (9–9)	Power (1–2)		39,560	58–37	W4
96	September 21	@ Padres	0–6	Welsh (6–6)	Leibrandt (1–1)		5,501	58–38	L1
97	September 22	@ Padres	3–2	Seaver (13–2)	Eichelberger (8–7)	Hume (11)	4,764	59–38	W1
98	September 23	@ Padres	5–1	Pastore (4–7)	Wise (3–8)	Price (4)	4,831	60–38	W2
99	September 25	@ Braves	10–2	Soto (10–9)	Boggs (3–12)		7,817	61–38	W3
100	September 26	@ Braves	2–0	Berenyi (9–5)	Niekro (7–6)	Hume (12)	5,117	62–38	W4
101	September 27	@ Braves	4–2	Seaver (14–2)	Perry (7–9)	LaCoss (1)	7,455	63–38	W5
102	September 28	Giants	0–4	Hargesheimer (1–1)	Pastore (4–8)		12,944	63–39	L1
103	September 29	Giants	4–3	Hume (9–3)	Minton (4–5)		13,117	64–39	W1
104	September 30	Astros	5–2	Soto (11–9)	Ruhle (4–6)	Hume (13)	24,394	65–39	W2

October: 1–3 (Home: 1–3; Away: 0–0)

#	Date	Opponent	Score	Win	Loss	Save	Attendance	Record	Streak
105	October 1	Astros	1–8	Ryan (11–5)	Berenyi (9–6)		26,484	65–40	L1
106	October 2	Braves	5–11	Perry (8–9)	Pastore (4–9)		14,793	65–41	L2
107	October 3	Braves	3–4	Mahler (8–6)	Hume (9–4)	Camp (17)	17,544	65–42	L3
108	October 4	Braves	3–0	Soto (12–9)	Boggs (3–13)		31,764	66–42	W1

== Player stats ==
=== Batting ===
= Indicates team leader

==== Starters by position ====
Note: Pos = Position; G = Games played; AB = At bats; H = Hits; Avg. = Batting average; HR = Home runs; RBI = Runs batted in

Pos	Player	G	AB	H	Avg.	HR	RBI
C	Joe Nolan	81	236	73	.309	1	26
1B	Dan Driessen	82	233	55	.236	7	33
2B	Ron Oester	105	354	96	.271	5	42
SS	Dave Concepción	106	421	129	.306	5	67
3B	Ray Knight	106	386	100	.259	6	34
LF	George Foster	108	414	122	.295	22	90
CF	Ken Griffey	101	396	123	.311	2	34
RF	Dave Collins	95	360	98	.272	3	23

==== Other batters ====
Note: G = Games played; AB = At bats; H = Hits; Avg. = Batting average; HR = Home runs; RBI = Runs batted in

Player	G	AB	H	Avg.	HR	RBI
Johnny Bench	52	178	55	.309	8	25
Mike O'Berry	55	111	20	.180	1	5
Paul Householder	23	69	19	.275	2	9
Larry Biittner	42	61	13	.213	0	8
Sam Mejías	66	49	14	.286	0	7
Junior Kennedy	27	44	11	.250	0	5
Mike Vail	31	31	5	.161	0	3
Harry Spilman	23	24	4	.167	0	3
Rafael Landestoy	12	11	2	.182	0	1
Germán Barranca	9	6	2	.333	0	1
Eddie Milner	8	5	1	.200	0	1
Neil Fiala	2	2	1	.500	0	1

=== Pitching ===
= Indicates league leader

==== Starting pitchers ====
Note: G = Games pitched; IP = Innings pitched; W = Wins; L = Losses; ERA = Earned run average; SO = Strikeouts; BB = Base on Balls

Player	G	IP	W	L	ERA	SO	BB
Mario Soto	25	175.0	12	9	3.29	151	61
Tom Seaver	23	166.1	14	2	2.54	87	66
Frank Pastore	22	132.0	4	9	4.02	81	35
Bruce Berenyi	21	126.0	9	6	3.50	106	77

==== Other pitchers ====
Note: G = Games pitched; IP = Innings pitched; W = Wins; L = Losses; ERA = Earned run average; SO = Strikeouts

Player	G	IP	W	L	ERA	SO
Mike LaCoss	20	78.0	4	7	6.12	22
Charlie Liebrandt	7	30.0	1	1	3.60	9

==== Relief pitchers ====
Note: G = Games pitched; W = Wins; L = Losses; SV = Saves; ERA = Earned run average; SO = Strikeouts

Player	G	W	L	SV	ERA	SO
Tom Hume	51	9	4	13	3.46	27
Joe Price	41	6	1	4	2.52	41
Paul Moskau	27	2	1	2	.494	32
Doug Bair	24	2	2	0	5.77	16
Geoff Combe	14	1	0	0	7.64	9
Scott Brown	10	1	0	0	2.77	7
Joe Edelen	5	1	0	0	0.71	5

== Awards and honors ==
- Johnny Bench, Hutch Award

== Farm system ==
Level	Team	League	Manager
AAA	Indianapolis Indians	American Association	Jim Beauchamp
AA	Waterbury Reds	Eastern League	George Scherger
A	Tampa Tarpons	Florida State League	Jim Lett
A	Cedar Rapids Reds	Midwest League	Randy Davidson
A-Short Season	Eugene Emeralds	Northwest League	Greg Riddoch
Rookie	Billings Mustangs	Pioneer League	Jim Hoff
