= 1982 Cincinnati Reds season =

1982 Cincinnati Reds
- League: National League
- Division: West
- Ballpark: Riverfront Stadium
- City: Cincinnati
- Record: 61–101 (.377)
- Divisional place: 6th
- Owners: William & James Williams
- General managers: Dick Wagner
- Managers: John McNamara, Russ Nixon
- Television: WLWT (Ray Lane, Bill Brown, Dick Carlson)
- Radio: WLW (Marty Brennaman, Joe Nuxhall, Lindsey Nelson)

The 1982 Cincinnati Reds season was the 113th season for the franchise in Major League Baseball, and their 13th and 12th full season at Riverfront Stadium. The Reds finished in sixth place in the National League West, with a record of 61 wins and 101 losses, 28 games behind the Atlanta Braves. The Reds played their home games at Riverfront Stadium. John McNamara managed the club to a 34–58 start before being replaced in late July by Russ Nixon, who compiled a 27–43 record the rest of the year. 1982 was the first time that the Reds finished in last place since 1937, as well as their first losing season since 1971, the team's first full season at Riverfront. It was also the first 100-loss season in franchise history. They would not have another 100-loss season until 40 years later in 2022.

== Offseason ==
- November 4, 1981: Ken Griffey was traded by the Reds to the New York Yankees for a player to be named later and Brian Ryder (minors). The Yankees completed the deal by sending Freddie Toliver to the Reds on December 9.
- December 11, 1981: Scott Brown was traded by the Reds to the Kansas City Royals for Clint Hurdle.
- December 18, 1981: Ray Knight was traded by the Reds to the Houston Astros for César Cedeño.
- January 12, 1982: Randy Myers was drafted by the Reds in the 3rd round of the 1982 Major League Baseball draft, but did not sign.
- February 9, 1982: Paul Moskau was traded by the Reds to the Baltimore Orioles for a player to be named later. The Orioles completed the deal by sending Wayne Krenchicki to the Reds on February 16.
- February 10, 1982: George Foster was traded by the Reds to the New York Mets for Alex Treviño, Jim Kern, and Greg A. Harris.

== Regular season ==
=== Season standings ===
NL West
Team	W	L	Pct.	GB	Home	Road
Atlanta Braves	89	73	.549	—	42‍–‍39	47‍–‍34
Los Angeles Dodgers	88	74	.543	1	43‍–‍38	45‍–‍36
San Francisco Giants	87	75	.537	2	45‍–‍36	42‍–‍39
San Diego Padres	81	81	.500	8	43‍–‍38	38‍–‍43
Houston Astros	77	85	.475	12	43‍–‍38	34‍–‍47
Cincinnati Reds	61	101	.377	28	33‍–‍48	28‍–‍53

=== Record vs. opponents ===
1982 National League record Sources:
Team	ATL	CHC	CIN	HOU	LAD	MON	NYM	PHI	PIT	SD	SF	STL
Atlanta	—	8–4	14–4	10–8	7–11	5–7	9–3	6–6	4–8	11–7	8–10	7–5
Chicago	4–8	—	6–6	9–3	5–7	6–12	9–9	9–9	9–9	4–8	6–6	6–12
Cincinnati	4–14	6–6	—	7–11	7–11	4–8	7–5	5–7	4–8	6–12	6–12	5–7
Houston	8–10	3–9	11–7	—	7–11	4–8	8–4	7–5	9–3	9–9	5–13	6–6
Los Angeles	11–7	7–5	11–7	11–7	—	8–4	6–6	4–8	5–7	9–9	9–9	7–5
Montreal	7–5	12–6	8–4	8–4	4–8	—	11–7	8–10	7–11	7–5	4–8	10–8
New York	3–9	9–9	5–7	4–8	6–6	7–11	—	7–11	8–10	6–6	4–8	6–12
Philadelphia	6-6	9–9	7–5	5–7	8–4	10–8	11–7	—	9–9	7–5	10–2	7–11
Pittsburgh	8–4	9–9	8–4	3–9	7–5	11–7	10–8	9–9	—	6–6	6–6	7–11
San Diego	7–11	8–4	12–6	9–9	9–9	5–7	6–6	5–7	6–6	—	10–8	4–8
San Francisco	10–8	6–6	12–6	13–5	9–9	8–4	8–4	2–10	6–6	8–10	—	5–7
St. Louis	5–7	12–6	7–5	6–6	5–7	8–10	12–6	11–7	11–7	8–4	7–5	—

=== Notable transactions ===
- March 26, 1982: Joe Nolan was traded by the Reds to the Baltimore Orioles for Dallas Williams and Brooks Carey (minors).

=== Roster ===
1982 Cincinnati Reds roster
Roster
Pitchers: 38 Bruce Berenyi; 40 Joe Edelen; 32,37 Greg Harris; 45 Ben Hayes; 47 Tom Hume; 34 Jim Kern; 44 Charlie Leibrandt; 50 Brad Lesley; 35 Frank Pastore; 49 Joe Price; 34 Bill Scherrer; 41 Tom Seaver; 32 Bob Shirley; 36 Mario Soto	Catchers: 9 Mike O'Berry; 29 Alex Treviño; 24,60 Dave Van Gorder; Infielders: 12 German Barranca; 5 Johnny Bench; 13 Dave Concepción; 22 Dan Driessen; 19 Wayne Krenchicki; 7 Rafael Landestoy; 17,56 Tom Lawless; 16 Ron Oester	Outfielders: 33 Larry Biittner; 28 César Cedeño; 21 Paul Householder; 30 Clint Hurdle; 20 Eddie Milner; 61 Gary Redus; 23 Mike Vail; 26 Duane Walker	Manager: 3 John McNamara; 2 Russ Nixon; Coaches: 8 Joey Amalfitano; 4 Harry Dunlop (Bullpen); 6 Bill Fischer (Pitching); 2 Russ Nixon (First Base); 11 Ron Plaza

== Player stats ==
=== Batting ===
==== Starters by position ====
Note: Pos = Position; G = Games played; AB = At bats; H = Hits; Avg. = Batting average; HR = Home runs; RBI = Runs batted in

Pos	Player	G	AB	H	Avg.	HR	RBI
C	Alex Treviño	120	355	89	.251	1	33
1B	Dan Driessen	149	516	139	.269	17	57
2B	Ron Oester	151	549	143	.260	9	47
SS	Dave Concepción	147	572	164	.287	5	53
3B	Johnny Bench	119	399	103	.258	13	38
LF	Eddie Milner	113	407	109	.268	4	31
CF	César Cedeño	138	492	142	.289	8	57
RF	Paul Householder	138	417	88	.211	9	34

==== Other batters ====
Note: G = Games played; AB = At bats; H = Hits; Avg. = Batting average; HR = Home runs; RBI = Runs batted in

Player	G	AB	H	Avg.	HR	RBI
Duane Walker	86	239	52	.218	5	22
Mike Vail	78	189	48	.254	4	29
Wayne Krenchicki	94	187	53	.283	2	21
Larry Biittner	97	184	57	.310	2	24
Tom Lawless	49	165	35	.212	0	4
Dave Van Gorder	51	137	25	.182	0	7
Rafael Landestoy	73	111	21	.189	1	9
Gary Redus	20	83	18	.217	1	7
Germán Barranca	46	51	13	.255	0	2
Mike O'Berry	21	45	10	.222	0	3
Clint Hurdle	19	34	7	.206	0	1

=== Pitching ===
==== Starting pitchers ====
Note: G = Games pitched; IP = Innings pitched; W = Wins; L = Losses; ERA = Earned run average; SO = Strikeouts

Player	G	IP	W	L	ERA	SO
Mario Soto	35	257.2	14	13	2.79	274
Bruce Berenyi	34	222.1	9	18	3.36	157
Frank Pastore	31	188.1	8	13	3.97	94
Tom Seaver	21	111.1	5	13	5.50	62

==== Other pitchers ====
Note: G = Games pitched; IP = Innings pitched; W = Wins; L = Losses; ERA = Earned run average; SO = Strikeouts

Player	G	IP	W	L	ERA	SO
Bob Shirley	41	152.2	8	13	3.60	89
Charlie Leibrandt	36	107.2	5	7	5.10	34
Greg A. Harris	34	91.1	2	6	4.83	67
Bill Scherrer	5	17.1	0	1	2.60	7

==== Relief pitchers ====
Note: G = Games pitched; W = Wins; L = Losses; SV = Saves; ERA = Earned run average; SO = Strikeouts

Player	G	W	L	SV	ERA	SO
Tom Hume	46	2	6	17	3.11	22
Joe Price	59	3	4	3	2.85	71
Jim Kern	50	3	5	2	2.84	43
Brad Lesley	28	0	2	4	2.58	29
Ben Hayes	26	2	0	2	1.97	38
Joe Edelen	9	0	0	0	8.80	11

== Farm system ==
Level	Team	League	Manager
AAA	Indianapolis Indians	American Association	George Scherger
AA	Waterbury Reds	Eastern League	Jim Lett
A	Tampa Tarpons	Florida State League	Jim Hoff
A	Cedar Rapids Reds	Midwest League	Randy Davidson
A-Short Season	Eugene Emeralds	Northwest League	Jimmy Stewart
Rookie	Billings Mustangs	Pioneer League	Marc Bombard

LEAGUE CHAMPIONS: Indianapolis
