= Bruce Berenyi =

American baseball player (born 1954)

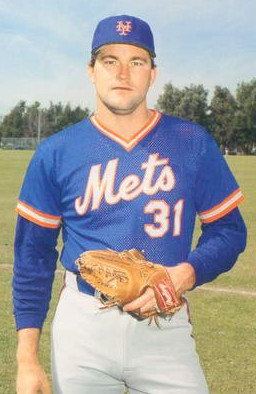
- Berenyi in 1986
- Pitcher
- Born: August 21, 1954 (age 72); Bryan, Ohio, U.S.
- Batted: Right Threw: Right

MLB debut
- July 5, 1980, for the Cincinnati Reds

Last MLB appearance
- July 9, 1986, for the New York Mets

MLB statistics
- Win–loss record: 44–55
- Earned run average: 4.03
- Strikeouts: 607
- Stats at Baseball Reference

Teams
- Cincinnati Reds (1980–1984); New York Mets (1984–1986)

Bruce Michael Berenyi (born August 21, 1954) is an American former Major League Baseball starting pitcher, whose major league career lasted from 1980 to 1986.

== Early years ==
Berenyi's uncle was MLB pitcher Ned Garver.

Berenyi played basketball as well as baseball at Fairview High School in Sherwood, Ohio. While attending Glen Oaks Community College, Berenyi was drafted by the Detroit Tigers in the nineteenth round of the 1975 Major League Baseball draft, but did not sign. After a year at Northeast Missouri State University, he was drafted by the Cincinnati Reds in the first round (third overall) of the June 1976 Secondary draft.

== Career ==
=== Cincinnati Reds ===
Berenyi went 37–30 with a 3.07 earned run average and 519 strikeouts over five seasons in the Reds' farm system to earn a mid-season call up to the majors in 1980. His major league debut, against the Houston Astros, went poorly; making the start, he retired just one of seven batters, and was pulled with four runs already scored, and runners on first and second. Reliever Mario Soto allowed both inherited runners to score before retiring the next two, giving Berenyi six earned runs allowed in one-third of an inning, an ERA of 162.00. Berenyi earned his first career win, against the New York Mets, on July 18. He held the Mets scoreless with seven strikeouts through seven before allowing the first three batters he faced in the eighth to reach. The Mets had pushed a run across, and had runners on first and third when Berenyi exited the game in favor of Tom Hume. Hume allowed both inherited runners to score, giving Berenyi three earned runs allowed in seven innings on the day.

Young starters Berenyi, Soto, Frank Pastore and Mike LaCoss, behind veteran future Hall of Famer Tom Seaver, pitched the 1981 Reds to a Major League Baseball-best 66–41 record. However, due to a split-season format, caused by the 1981 Major League Baseball strike, the Reds finished in second both halves of the season and thus failed to make the playoffs. Berenyi was 4–2 with a 5.01 ERA when he pitched a one-hit shutout against the Montreal Expos to lower his ERA to 4.31 as the players headed into the strike. Berenyi ran into some hard luck in the second half of the season, and was just 4-4 despite dropping his ERA to 2.64. Overall, he was 9–6 with a 3.50 ERA and 106 strikeouts in 20 starts. His 77 walks led the National League.

Berenyi got off to a 4–1 start in April 1982 before hard luck began to haunt him once again. He went 1–8 over his next thirteen starts, despite an ERA that was only slightly above 4.00. After a decent stretch following the All-Star break (3-1, 2.35 ERA), Berenyi lost his next eight decisions in a row with a 3.84 ERA. He was the losing pitcher on August 14 against the Astros despite not allowing an earned run. He also did not allow an earned run in his next start, and got a no decision (for the season, Berenyi had a 2.15 ERA in his no decisions). Berenyi shut out the Astros for his ninth and final win of the season on September 24. He had a league-worst eighteen losses for a Reds team that was last in the major leagues in scoring (3.36 runs a game) and slugging (.350), and lost 101 games.

After a 1983 season that saw Berenyi go 9–14 with a 3.86 ERA, he began requesting a trade, but went into the 1984 season still with the Reds. In the second game of the season, he pitched six strong innings, allowing two runs, but the Reds did not score any runs. On May 5, Berenyi faced five batters, and failed to record an out in a start against the Philadelphia Phillies. On May 19, he faced five St. Louis Cardinals batters, and failed to record an out. He was 3–7 with an even 6.00 ERA on June 15 when the Reds traded him to the Mets for minor leaguers Jay Tibbs, Eddie Williams and Matt Bullinger.

=== New York Mets ===
Due to their core of young prospects, the cellar-dwelling Mets were a surprising 33-25 when Berenyi joined them. The Mets released veteran Mike Torrez in order to make room for Berenyi in their starting rotation, making Berenyi the Mets' oldest starter at 29 years old.

He lost his first Mets start, but rebounded in his second, pitching seven shutout innings against the Expos before handing the ball to Doug Sisk. As a Met, Berenyi went 9–6 with a 3.76 ERA.

Despite Berenyi's only being with the Mets for half a season, 1984 turned out to be the year he made the most appearances with his new club. In his first start of 1985, against Mario Soto and the Reds, he pitched seven innings of one-hit, one walk ball. Berenyi pitched two innings into his third start of the season before being lifted with shoulder pain. He would undergo arthroscopic shoulder surgery that would sideline him for the remainder of the season.

The Mets took a slow approach with Berenyi in 1986. He made four appearances out of the bullpen, pitching 5.1 innings, before making his first start. Berenyi would make 14 appearances for the eventual World Series champion Mets, going 2–2 with a 6.35 ERA before being reassigned to the Triple A Tidewater Tides in July, where he went 2–6 with a 6.61 ERA. He failed to make the postseason roster with the parent club, but was awarded a World Series ring by the club, which he later sold at auction for $15,000.

The Mets released Berenyi following the 1986 World Series. He signed as a free agent with the Expos prior to Spring training 1987, but failed to make the club.

== Personal life ==
Berenyi's partner of 18 years, Stanley Buxton, died in 2017.

== Career statistics ==
W	L	Pct	ERA	G	GS	GF	SHO	IP	H	ER	R	HR	BB	K	WP	HBP	BAA	Fld%	Avg.
44	55	.444	4.03	142	131	4	5	781.2	730	350	392	32	425	607	52	7	.251	.977	.197
