= 1981 St. Louis Cardinals season =

Major League Baseball season

1981 St. Louis Cardinals
- League: National League
- Division: East
- Ballpark: Busch Memorial Stadium
- City: St. Louis, Missouri
- Record: 59–43 (.578)
- Divisional place: 2nd
- Owners: August "Gussie" Busch
- General managers: Whitey Herzog
- Managers: Whitey Herzog
- Television: KSDK (Jack Buck, Mike Shannon, Jay Randolph, Dan Kelly)
- Radio: KMOX (Jack Buck, Mike Shannon, Dan Kelly)

The 1981 St. Louis Cardinals season was the 100th season for the St. Louis Cardinals in St. Louis, Missouri and the 90th season in the National League. 1981 was a season of two significant anomalies: A change in the playoff format, which created the first-ever NLDS with a qualification variant that existed only for that season, and the players' strike, which truncated the regular season. Despite finishing 59-43, good for the best overall record in the National League East, the strike set up the scenario where the Cardinals actually missed the playoffs. The regular season was split into halves to tally teams' records separately in each half of the season, and because the Cardinals finished in second place in each half, they did not qualify for the 1981 playoffs. Major League Baseball reverted to the previous playoff format the following season, and the Cardinals qualified for that postseason.

First baseman Keith Hernandez won a Gold Glove this year.

== Offseason ==
- December 8, 1980: Terry Kennedy, Steve Swisher, Mike Phillips, John Littlefield, John Urrea, Kim Seaman, and Al Olmsted were traded by the Cardinals to the San Diego Padres for Rollie Fingers, Bob Shirley, Gene Tenace and a player to be named later. The Padres completed the deal by sending Bob Geren to the Cardinals on December 10.
- December 9, 1980: Leon Durham, Ken Reitz and a player to be named later were traded by the Cardinals to the Chicago Cubs for Bruce Sutter. The Cardinals completed the trade by sending Tye Waller to the Cubs on December 22.
- December 12, 1980: Ted Simmons, Rollie Fingers and Pete Vuckovich were traded by the Cardinals to the Milwaukee Brewers for Sixto Lezcano, David Green, Lary Sorensen and Dave LaPoint.
- February 16, 1981: The Cardinals traded a player to be named later to the New York Yankees for Rafael Santana. The Cardinals completed the deal by sending George Frazier to the Yankees on June 7.

== Regular season ==
=== Season standings ===
NL East
Team	W	L	Pct.	GB	Home	Road
St. Louis Cardinals	59	43	.578	—	32‍–‍21	27‍–‍22
Montreal Expos	60	48	.556	2	38‍–‍18	22‍–‍30
Philadelphia Phillies	59	48	.551	2½	36‍–‍19	23‍–‍29
Pittsburgh Pirates	46	56	.451	13	22‍–‍28	24‍–‍28
New York Mets	41	62	.398	18½	24‍–‍27	17‍–‍35
Chicago Cubs	38	65	.369	21½	27‍–‍30	11‍–‍35

NL East First Half Standings	W	L	Pct.	GB
Philadelphia Phillies	34	21	.618	—
St. Louis Cardinals	30	20	.600	1 1/2
Montreal Expos	30	25	.545	4
Pittsburgh Pirates	25	23	.521	5 1/2
New York Mets	17	34	.333	15
Chicago Cubs	15	37	.288	17 1/2

NL East Second Half Standings	W	L	Pct.	GB
Montreal Expos	30	23	.566	—
St. Louis Cardinals	29	23	.558	1/2
Philadelphia Phillies	25	27	.481	4 1/2
New York Mets	24	28	.462	5 1/2
Chicago Cubs	23	28	.451	6
Pittsburgh Pirates	21	33	.389	9 1/2

=== Record vs. opponents ===
1981 National League record Sources:
Team	ATL	CHC	CIN	HOU	LAD	MON	NYM	PHI	PIT	SD	SF	STL
Atlanta	—	3–2–1	6–5	4–8	7–7	3–7	3–3	4–5	2–3	9–6	5–7	4–3
Chicago	2–3–1	—	1–5	1–6	6–4	4–7	5–8–1	2–10	4–10	3–3	5–5	5–4–1
Cincinnati	5–6	5–1	—	8–4	8–8	5–4	7–3	5–2	4–2	10–2	9–5	0–5
Houston	8–4	6–1	4–8	—	4–8	5–2	6–3	4–6	2–4	11–3	9–6	2–4
Los Angeles	7–7	4–6	8–8	8–4	—	5–2	5–1	3–3	5–1	6–5	7–5	5–5
Montreal	7–3	7–4	4–5	2–5	2–5	—	9–3	7–4	10–3	4–2	2–5	6–9
New York	3–3	8–5–1	3–7	3–6	1–5	3–9	—	7–7	3–6–1	2–5	2–4	6–5
Philadelphia	5-4	10–2	2–5	6–4	3–3	4–7	7–7	—	7–5	4–2	4–3	7–6
Pittsburgh	3–2	10–4	2–4	4–2	1–5	3–10	6–3–1	5–7	—	6–4	3–7	3–8
San Diego	6–9	3–3	2–10	3–11	5–6	2–4	5–2	2–4	4–6	—	6–7	3–7
San Francisco	7–5	5–5	5–9	6–9	5–7	5–2	4–2	3–4	7–3	7–6	—	2–3
St. Louis	3–4	4–5–1	5–0	4–2	5–5	9–6	5–6	6–7	8–3	7–3	3–2	—

=== Opening Day starters ===
- Bob Forsch
- George Hendrick
- Keith Hernandez
- Tom Herr
- Sixto Lezcano
- Ken Oberkfell
- Darrell Porter
- Tony Scott
- Garry Templeton

=== Notable transactions ===
- April 3, 1981: Julio González was signed as a free agent by the Cardinals.
- April 29, 1981: Bill Lyons was signed as a free agent by the Cardinals.
- June 7, 1981: Tony Scott was traded by the Cardinals to the Houston Astros for Joaquín Andújar.
- June 8, 1981: 1981 Major League Baseball draft
  - Bobby Meacham was drafted by the St. Louis Cardinals in the 1st round (8th pick) of the 1981 amateur draft.
  - Tom Nieto was drafted by the St. Louis Cardinals in the 3rd round.
  - Danny Cox was drafted by the Cardinals in the 13th round.
- September 10, 1981: Joe Edelen and Neil Fiala were traded by the Cardinals to the Cincinnati Reds for Doug Bair.

=== Roster ===
1981 St. Louis Cardinals roster
Roster
Pitchers: 49 Joaquín Andújar; 43 Doug Bair; 49 Luis DeLeón; 44 Joe Edelen; 31 Bob Forsch; 36 Jim Kaat; 47 Dave LaPoint; 32 Mark Littell; 33 John Martin; 35 Silvio Martínez; 40 Jim Otten; 46 Andy Rincon; 32 Bob Shirley; 39 Lary Sorensen; 42 Bruce Sutter; 38 Bob Sykes	Catchers: 11 Glenn Brummer; 15 Darrell Porter; 23 Orlando Sánchez; 18 Gene Tenace; Infielders: 14 Julio González; 37 Keith Hernandez; 28 Tom Herr; 10 Ken Oberkfell; 5 Mike Ramsey; 1 Garry Templeton	Outfielders: 26 Steve Braun; 27 David Green; 25 George Hendrick; 19 Dane Iorg; 21 Tito Landrum; 16 Sixto Lezcano; 29 Gene Roof; 30 Tony Scott; Other batters: 51 Neil Fiala	Manager: 24 Whitey Herzog; Coaches: 4 Chuck Hiller; 9 Hub Kittle; 8 Hal Lanier; 3 Dave Ricketts; 2 Red Schoendienst

== Player stats ==
= Indicates team leader

=== Batting ===
==== Starters by position ====
Note: Pos = Position; G = Games played; AB = At bats; H = Hits; Avg. = Batting average; HR = Home runs; RBI = Runs batted in

Pos	Player	G	AB	H	Avg.	HR	RBI
C	Darrell Porter	61	174	39	.224	6	31
1B	Keith Hernandez	103	376	115	.306	8	48
2B	Tom Herr	103	411	110	.268	0	46
SS	Garry Templeton	80	333	96	.288	1	33
3B	Ken Oberkfell	102	376	110	.293	2	45
LF	Dane Iorg	75	217	71	.327	2	39
CF	Tony Scott	45	176	40	.227	2	17
RF	George Hendrick	101	394	112	.284	18	61

==== Other batters ====
Note: G = Games played; AB = At bats; H = Hits; Avg. = Batting average; HR = Home runs; RBI = Runs batted in

Player	G	AB	H	Avg.	HR	RBI
Sixto Lezcano	72	214	57	.266	5	28
Gene Tenace	58	129	30	.233	5	22
Mike Ramsey	47	124	32	.258	0	9
Tito Landrum	81	119	31	.261	0	10
Gene Roof	23	60	18	.300	0	3
Orlando Sánchez	27	49	14	.286	0	6
Steve Braun	44	46	9	.196	0	2
David Green	21	34	5	.147	0	2
Glenn Brummer	21	30	6	.200	0	2
Julio González	20	22	7	.318	1	3
Neil Fiala	3	3	0	.000	0	0

=== Pitching ===
= Indicates league leader

==== Starting pitchers ====
Note: G = Games pitched; IP = Innings pitched; W = Wins; L = Losses; ERA = Earned run average; SO = Strikeouts

Player	G	IP	W	L	ERA	SO
Lary Sorensen	23	140.1	7	7	3.27	52
Bob Forsch	20	124.1	10	5	3.18	41
John Martin	17	102.2	8	5	3.42	36
Silvio Martínez	18	97.0	2	5	3.99	34
Joaquín Andújar	11	55.1	6	1	3.74	19
Andy Rincon	5	35.2	3	1	1.77	13

==== Other pitchers ====
Note: G = Games pitched; IP = Innings pitched; W = Wins; L = Losses; ERA = Earned run average; SO = Strikeouts

Player	G	IP	W	L	ERA	SO
Bob Shirley	28	79.1	6	4	4.08	36
Dave LaPoint	3	10.2	1	0	4.22	4

==== Relief pitchers ====
Note: G = Games pitched; W = Wins; L = Losses; SV = Saves; ERA = Earned run average; SO = Strikeouts

Player	G	W	L	SV	ERA	SO
Bruce Sutter	48	3	5	25	2.62	57
Jim Kaat	41	6	6	4	3.40	8
Mark Littell	28	1	3	2	4.39	22
Jim Otten	24	1	0	0	5.30	20
Bob Sykes	22	2	0	0	4.58	14
Joe Edelen	13	1	0	0	9.35	10
Doug Bair	11	2	0	1	3.45	14
Luis DeLeón	10	0	1	0	2.35	8

== Farm system ==
Level	Team	League	Manager
AAA	Springfield Redbirds	American Association	Tommy Thompson
AA	Arkansas Travelers	Texas League	Gaylen Pitts
A	St. Petersburg Cardinals	Florida State League	Nick Leyva
A	Gastonia Cardinals	South Atlantic League	Joe Rigoli
A-Short Season	Erie Cardinals	New York–Penn League	Sonny Ruberto
Rookie	Johnson City Cardinals	Appalachian League	Johnny Lewis
