= 1982 Major League Baseball All-Star Game =

1982 American baseball competition

	1	2	3	4	5	6	7	8	9	R	H	E
American League	1	0	0	0	0	0	0	0	0	1	8	2
National League	0	2	1	0	0	1	0	0	X	4	8	1
- Date: July 13, 1982
- Venue: Olympic Stadium
- City: Montreal, Quebec
- Managers: Billy Martin (OAK); Tommy Lasorda (LA)
- MVP: Dave Concepción (CIN)
- Attendance: 59,057
- Ceremonial first pitch: Luis Aparicio, Bobby Ávila, Yogi Berra, Orlando Cepeda, Isao Harimoto, Juan Marichal, Minnie Miñoso, Shigeo Nagashima, Claude Raymond, Manny Sanguillén, George Selkirk, Duke Snider and Bobby Thomson
- Television: ABC
- TV announcers: Al Michaels, Keith Jackson, Howard Cosell and Don Drysdale
- Radio: CBS
- Radio announcers: Vin Scully and Brent Musburger

The 1982 Major League Baseball All-Star Game was the 53rd midseason exhibition between the all-stars of the American League (AL) and the National League (NL), the two leagues comprising Major League Baseball. The game was played on July 13, 1982, at Olympic Stadium in Montreal, Quebec, Canada, home of the Montreal Expos of the National League. The game resulted in a 4–1 victory for the NL, and Cincinnati Reds shortstop Dave Concepción was named the MVP.

It is notable for being the first All-Star Game ever played outside the United States. This would be the only All-Star Game to be played in Montréal, as the Expos would leave in 2005 to become the Washington Nationals before having an opportunity to host another. Four members of the Expos were voted into the starting lineup. The flyover at the conclusion of the National Anthems was done for the first time by a national air squadron other than those from the United States Air Force or Air National Guard as the Snowbirds from the Canadian Forces Air Command flew over Olympic Stadium, marking the first of their two All-Star appearances; they would perform the flyover for the 1991 Major League Baseball All-Star Game in Toronto nine years later. It is also the last All-Star Game in which the manager of the runner-up for any league pennant managed in place of the manager of the defending league champions due to the latter's unemployment; Billy Martin of the Oakland Athletics managed in place of Bob Lemon, who had been fired by the New York Yankees, Martin's former team.

== Rosters ==
Players in italics have since been inducted into the National Baseball Hall of Fame.

=== American League ===
Elected Starters
Position	Player	Team	All-Star Games
C	Carlton Fisk	White Sox	9
1B	Rod Carew	Angels	16
2B	Bobby Grich	Angels	6
3B	George Brett	Royals	7
SS	Robin Yount	Brewers	2
OF	Rickey Henderson	Athletics	2
OF	Reggie Jackson	Angels	12
OF	Fred Lynn	Angels	8

Pitchers
Position	Player	Team	All-Star Games
P	Floyd Bannister	Mariners	1
P	Jim Clancy	Blue Jays	1
P	Mark Clear	Red Sox	2
P	Dennis Eckersley	Red Sox	2
P	Rollie Fingers	Brewers	7
P	Rich Gossage	Yankees	7
P	Ron Guidry	Yankees	3
P	Dan Quisenberry	Royals	1

Reserves
Position	Player	Team	All-Star Games
C	Lance Parrish	Tigers	2
1B	Cecil Cooper	Brewers	3
1B	Kent Hrbek	Twins	1
1B	Eddie Murray	Orioles	3
1B	Andre Thornton	Indians	1
2B	Frank White	Royals	4
3B	Buddy Bell	Rangers	4
3B	Toby Harrah	Indians	4
OF	Hal McRae	Royals	3
OF	Ben Oglivie	Brewers	2
OF	Willie Wilson	Royals	1
OF	Dave Winfield	Yankees	6
OF	Carl Yastrzemski	Red Sox	17

=== National League ===
Elected Starters
Position	Player	Team	All-Star Games
C	Gary Carter	Expos	5
1B	Pete Rose	Phillies	16
2B	Manny Trillo	Phillies	3
3B	Mike Schmidt	Phillies	7
SS	Dave Concepción	Reds	9
OF	Andre Dawson	Expos	2
OF	Dale Murphy	Braves	2
OF	Tim Raines	Expos	2

Pitchers
Position	Player	Team	All-Star Games
P	Steve Carlton	Phillies	10
P	Steve Howe	Dodgers	1
P	Tom Hume	Reds	1
P	Greg Minton	Giants	1
P	Phil Niekro	Braves	4
P	Steve Rogers	Expos	4
P	Mario Soto	Reds	1
P	Fernando Valenzuela	Dodgers	2

Reserves
Position	Player	Team	All-Star Games
C	Tony Peña	Pirates	1
C	John Stearns	Mets	4
1B	Al Oliver	Expos	6
1B	Jason Thompson	Pirates	3
2B	Steve Sax	Dodgers	1
3B	Bob Horner	Braves	1
3B	Ray Knight	Astros	2
SS	Ozzie Smith	Cardinals	2
OF	Dusty Baker	Dodgers	2
OF	Leon Durham	Cubs	1
OF	Ruppert Jones	Padres	2
OF	Lonnie Smith	Cardinals	1

== Game ==
=== Umpires ===
Position	Umpire
Home Plate	Doug Harvey (NL)
First Base	Marty Springstead (AL)
Second Base	John McSherry (NL)
Third Base	Jim McKean (AL)
Left Field	Ed Montague (NL)
Right Field	Mike Reilly (AL)

=== Starting lineups ===
American League				National League			
Order	Player	Team	Position	Order	Player	Team	Position
1	Rickey Henderson	Athletics	LF	1	Tim Raines	Expos	LF
2	Fred Lynn	Angels	CF	2	Pete Rose	Phillies	1B
3	George Brett	Royals	3B	3	Andre Dawson	Expos	CF
4	Reggie Jackson	Angels	RF	4	Mike Schmidt	Phillies	3B
5	Cecil Cooper	Brewers	1B	5	Gary Carter	Expos	C
6	Robin Yount	Brewers	SS	6	Dale Murphy	Braves	RF
7	Bobby Grich	Angels	2B	7	Dave Concepción	Reds	SS
8	Carlton Fisk	White Sox	C	8	Manny Trillo	Phillies	2B
9	Dennis Eckersley	Red Sox	P	9	Steve Rogers	Expos	P

=== Game summary ===
Tuesday, July 13, 1982 8:40 pm (ET) at Olympic Stadium in Montreal, Quebec
Team	1	2	3	4	5	6	7	8	9	R	H	E
American League	1	0	0	0	0	0	0	0	0	1	8	2
National League	0	2	1	0	0	1	0	0	X	4	8	1
WP: Steve Rogers (1-0) LP: Dennis Eckersley (0-1) Sv: Tom Hume (1); Home runs: AL: None; NL: Dave Concepción (1)

The AL drew first blood in the first off NL starter Steve Rogers when Reggie Jackson drove home Rickey Henderson with a sacrifice fly. Dave Concepción responded for the NL with a two-run homer in the second off AL starter Dennis Eckersley and the NL never looked back. The NL tacked on a run in the third when Ruppert Jones tripled and Pete Rose hit a sacrifice fly. The NL got their final run in the sixth on a Gary Carter RBI single that scored then-Expo teammate Al Oliver.
