= Lubbock Crickets =

Minor league baseball team in Lubbock, Texas, United States (1995-1998)

The Lubbock Crickets were the first minor league baseball team to play in Lubbock, Texas after a 39-year hiatus. The Crickets joined the Texas-Louisiana League in 1995 as the first team not known as the Lubbock Hubbers. The team was named after Buddy Holly's band, The Crickets.

== 1995 ==
The Crickets started off strong, going 31-19 in the first half of '95 season. They fell to 22-28 in the second half, but then beat the Amarillo Dillas in the playoffs and the Alexandria Aces in the finals. The Crickets finished the '95 season with an overall record of 53-47, while also winning the league championship. Managed by Greg Minton, Lubbock had one All-Star, shortstop Rouglas Odor. Odor was added to the team midseason and hit .287. Third baseman Frank Bolick (.355) was second in the TLL average while the staff was led by Frank DiPino (9-5, 12 Sv, 3.39).

== 1996 ==
The Crickets went 27-23 in the first half of the '96 season, and 32-17 in the second half, finishing with an overall record of 59-40. Lubbock beat the Rio Grande Valley WhiteWings in two games in the first round of the playoffs, but lost the championship game to the Abilene Prairie Dogs. Minton's team included several All-Stars: utility player Mike Hardge (.303, 28 SB), starting pitcher Steve Duda (11-8, 3.76) and starting pitcher Ron Gerstein (14-4, 3.56). 1st Baseman Chris Norton batted .380 with 15 home runs.

== 1997 ==
In 1997 The Crickets struggled under new manager Glenn Sullivan, finishing with a record of 38-50. Mike Hardge was again named to the All-Star team as a utility player.

== 1998 ==
1998 would be the Lubbock Crickets' last season. Finishing 39-45, outfielder Derek Vaughn (.350, 46 SB) made the All-Star team, while outfielder Jason Landreth (.377, 22 SB) was third in the TLL in average.

== 1999 ==
The Crickets suspended operations for the 1999 season because of uncertain stadium availability, according to Texas-Louisiana League President Byron Pierce. The Crickets had leased Dan Law Field from Texas Tech since their inception in 1995, but the expansion of the NCAA baseball playoffs to 64 teams in 1999 created a stadium availability issue. This wasn't a new issue for the Lubbock Crickets. In 1996, The Crickets' first 10 games were played on the road followed by a home opener on May 30. In 1997, the Crickets played their home opener on May 29, seven days after the season started. In 1998, the season started on May 21 but the Crickets did not play a single home game until June 1. Team officials and Texas-Louisiana league informally discussed the idea of a building a new stadium in Lubbock. The $2 million proposal included a 4,000-seat facility with lights, dressing rooms and adequate concessions. However, with attendance numbers declining, financial woes, and stadium uncertainty, the team franchise dissolved following the 1998 season.
