= John McNamara (baseball) =

American baseball player and coach (1932–2020)

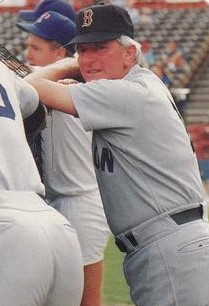
- McNamara managing the Red Sox in 1986
- Manager
- Born: June 4, 1932; Sacramento, California, U.S.
- Died: July 28, 2020 (aged 88); Brentwood, Tennessee, U.S.

Career statistics
- Games: 2,395
- Win–loss record: 1,160–1,233–2
- Winning %: .485
- Stats at Baseball Reference
- Managerial record at Baseball Reference

Teams
- As manager: Oakland Athletics (1969–1970); San Diego Padres (1974–1977); Cincinnati Reds (1979–1982); California Angels (1983–1984); Boston Red Sox (1985–1988); Cleveland Indians (1990–1991); California Angels (1996); As coach: Oakland Athletics (1968–1969); San Francisco Giants (1971–1973); California Angels (1978)

Career highlights and awards
- AL Manager of the Year (1986)

John Francis McNamara (June 4, 1932 – July 28, 2020) was an American professional baseball player, manager and coach. After spending over 15 years in the minor leagues as a catcher and player-manager, McNamara helmed six Major League Baseball (MLB) teams for all or parts of 19 seasons between 1969 and 1996. He managed the 1986 Boston Red Sox to the American League pennant, and was named the league's "Manager of the Year" by both the BBWAA and The Sporting News.

== Early life and playing career ==
McNamara was born in Sacramento, the fourth of five children of John and Josephine McNamara. His father, an Irish immigrant who was a railroad worker, died in 1944; his mother worked at the California Department of Motor Vehicles. McNamara attended Christian Brothers High School, where he was selected as an All-City player in both basketball and baseball. At Sacramento City College (SCC), he led his team to the 1951 California Community College Athletic Association state championship and later was inducted to the SCC Athletic Hall of Fame.

A right-handed batter and thrower who stood 5 feet 10 inches (1.78 m) tall and weighed 175 pounds (79 kg), in his playing days he was a peripatetic, weak-hitting catcher who originally signed with the St. Louis Cardinals organization in 1951. He rose as high as the Open-Classification Pacific Coast League during 1956 as a member of his hometown Solons, but he hit only .171 in 76 games played.

== Managing and coaching career ==
=== Minor leagues ===
McNamara began his managing career with the Lewis-Clark Broncs in Lewiston, Idaho, of the Class B Northwest League in 1959, and when the club became an affiliate of the Kansas City Athletics in 1960, McNamara joined the Athletics' farm system. After helming the Triple-A Dallas Rangers in 1964, he won Southern League pennants at Kansas City's Double-A affiliates, Mobile (1966) and Birmingham (1967), where he groomed many future members of the Oakland Athletics' early-1970s dynasty — including Hall of Famers Rollie Fingers and Reggie Jackson, as well as Sal Bando, Blue Moon Odom, Joe Rudi and others. At the same time, McNamara also mentored future Hall of Fame manager (then an infielder) Tony LaRussa and future pitching coach (then catcher) Dave Duncan. Jackson, in particular, credited McNamara with helping him through his time with Birmingham, with the racial tensions that existed in the Deep South at the time.

=== Oakland Athletics ===
McNamara served as a coach at the major-league level for Oakland from 1968 through September 18, 1969, when A's owner Charlie Finley fired manager Hank Bauer and promoted McNamara, then 37, to succeed him. The Athletics were in second place in the American League West Division, nine games behind the Minnesota Twins. They went 8–5 under McNamara for the rest of the campaign, then finished second to the Twins again in 1970 with an 89–73 mark. Finley replaced him with Dick Williams at season's end, and the A's would go on to win five successive division titles and three straight American League pennants and World Series titles under Williams and Alvin Dark.

=== San Diego Padres ===
McNamara returned to the coaching ranks from 1971 to 1973 with the cross-bay San Francisco Giants before he took over the struggling San Diego Padres as their manager in 1974. The Padres improved incrementally, winning 60, 71, and 73 games through 1976, then signed free agents Fingers and Gene Tenace away from McNamara's old team, the A's. Expected to dramatically improve in 1977, instead the Padres stood at only 20–28 on May 28 when McNamara was fired and replaced by Dark. He spent 1978 as a coach for the California Angels, then was hired to succeed Sparky Anderson, also a future Hall of Fame manager, as skipper of the Cincinnati Reds in 1979.

=== Cincinnati Reds ===
After World Series titles in 1975 and 1976, the Reds finished second to the Los Angeles Dodgers for two consecutive seasons in the National League West Division, and Anderson had been fired amid controversy, reportedly because he refused his front office's order to fire members of his coaching staff.

McNamara's 1979 Reds, minus legend Pete Rose, who had defected to the Philadelphia Phillies as a free agent, won 90 games—two fewer than Anderson's 1978 team. But they edged the Houston Astros by 11/2 games to win the NL West and became McNamara's first postseason entry. In the 1979 National League Championship Series, however, the Reds dropped the first two games at home in extra innings to the Pittsburgh Pirates, then were swept out of the playoffs in Game 3. Pittsburgh went on to win the 1979 World Series. McNamara's 1980 Reds won 89 games but finished third, 31/2 games behind Houston.

Then came Cincinnati's frustrating 1981 season: the Reds compiled the best overall record in the National League West (66–42, .611), but the split-season format adopted because of the 1981 Major League Baseball strike denied them a place in the playoffs because they finished second (initially to the Dodgers, then to the Astros) in each half-season. The 1981 campaign became all the more distressing because the 1982 Reds unraveled, losing 58 of their first 92 games, falling into the division basement. McNamara was fired on July 20, 1982, with Cincinnati 23 games out of first place.

=== California Angels ===
Buzzie Bavasi had been the president of the Padres when McNamara became their manager in 1974, and had moved to the California Angels after the 1977 season as general manager. Along with then-manager Dave Garcia, he had hired McNamara as an Angels coach in 1978, before the Reds job opened up. After the 1982 season, when the Angels lost a heart-breaking ALCS to the Milwaukee Brewers, their veteran manager, Gene Mauch, retired. Bavasi then hired McNamara a third time, this time as skipper of the 1983 Angels, although that team dropped precipitously in the standings, winning only 70 games – 23 fewer than in 1982 – and finishing 29 games behind the Chicago White Sox. The following year, the 1984 Angels clawed back to .500 at 81–81, but came within three games of the division champion Kansas City Royals, who won only 84 contests all season.

McNamara clashed with pitcher Tommy John that year, not listening to John when the 41-year-old pitcher told him he was tiring in games. Late in the year, he moved John to the bullpen, then forbid him to practice throwing because he wanted to keep the pitcher's arm fresh in case he needed him. Wanting practice to get his problems straightened out, John practiced throwing anyway, much to McNamara's displeasure. Frank Pastore had the same issue with McNamara during the manager's time with the Reds.

=== Boston Red Sox ===
When Ralph Houk, 65, retired as Boston's manager at the close of the 1984 season, the Red Sox approached the Angels about McNamara's availability for the opening; he and Haywood Sullivan, the Red Sox' chief executive officer and co-owner, had managed together in the Athletics' organization in the mid-1960s. With Mauch ready to return to the dugout, the Angels agreed to let McNamara go to Boston, and in 1985, he led the Red Sox to another .500 season; but at 81–81, they finished 181/2 games behind the Toronto Blue Jays in the American League East Division.

However, 1986 would be a different story. With fireballing Roger Clemens winning his first 14 decisions en route to the Cy Young Award and American League Most Valuable Player Award, the Red Sox won 95 games and captured the division title, setting the stage for McNamara's second and final postseason appearance as a manager. First, they battled back from a three-games-to-one deficit to defeat Mauch's Angels in the 1986 American League Championship Series, reaching the World Series against the National League champion New York Mets.

==== 1986 World Series ====
McNamara's managerial decisions during the 1986 World Series (especially in the last two games) have received much criticism and scrutiny. In the pivotal Game 6, McNamara removed Red Sox ace Roger Clemens after the seventh inning despite the fact that Clemens was still pitching well and did not appear to be tiring. McNamara and Clemens have told conflicting stories about the decision. Clemens has said that he does not know why he was removed; he notes that he had taken the on-deck circle in the top of the eighth inning because he had expected to bat and then pitch the bottom of the inning. McNamara, however, has insisted that Clemens asked to be taken out because he had developed a blister on his pitching hand and felt that he was tiring. Other players have backed Clemens's version. Clemens has admitted that he had indeed developed a blister that would've prevented him from throwing his slider.

McNamara's move was further questioned in light of the relatively poor performances of closer Calvin Schiraldi and longtime reliever Bob Stanley. He had brought in Schiraldi for what he intended to be a two-inning save, but Schiraldi surrendered the tying run in the eighth inning. Despite have blown the save, McNamara sent Schiraldi out to pitch the tenth inning.

McNamara was also criticized for pinch-hitting Clemens with rookie Mike Greenwell, who struck out on three pitches, when veteran slugger and noted clutch hitter Don Baylor was also available.

However, perhaps the decision that McNamara will be most remembered for is his leaving first baseman Bill Buckner in the game in the 10th inning rather than removing him for a defensive substitute. Buckner committed an infamous error in the 10th inning allowing the Mets to win the game after they had tied it earlier in the inning. McNamara was ridiculed for years afterward for leaving Buckner on the field instead of replacing him with Dave Stapleton, who had previously been used to replace Buckner in late innings for defensive purposes (including Games 1 and 5 of the World Series). He later said, "I felt Buckner deserved to be on the field when we won." The Red Sox players also believed that their manager let sentiment overpower his judgement. Stapleton claimed that "[McNamara] damn well knows that he messed up. And he very well could have cost us the World Series that year." McNamara finally responded to Stapleton's attack in 2011 during an interview with Bob Costas for MLB Network, changing his original claim that sentiment was what caused him to keep Buckner in the game and saying that Stapleton had the nickname of "Shaky" because of his poor defense. It was an odd position to take, considering McNamara had used Stapleton in that spot all season long.

With Game 7 delayed a day due to rain in New York, McNamara bumped originally-scheduled starting pitcher Oil Can Boyd in favor of starting Bruce Hurst, the winner of Games 1 and 5 and the presumptive MVP of the series if the Red Sox were to win, on three days' rest; the Red Sox had chosen to go with a normal four-man rotation during the series, unlike the Mets who pitched a three-man rotation. The decision upset Boyd so much that he began drinking heavily afterward and drank himself to the point of intoxication, according to accounts given by McNamara and his pitching coach Bill Fischer, thus rendering him unavailable.

Hurst was staked to a 3–0 lead and pitched shutout ball for five innings, but tired in the sixth, he allowed the Mets to score three runs to tie the game. Since Boyd's actions had left the bullpen short staffed in a situation where every able pitcher would need to be available in case of an emergency, McNamara decided to bring Calvin Schiraldi in despite his struggles in Game 6 and the fact that he was still tired from pitching 2.2 innings that night (something he wasn't used to). Schiraldi gave up a tie-breaking home run to Ray Knight, the first batter he faced, and ended up surrendering three runs while recording only a single out. The Red Sox would lose the game 8–5, thus losing the series.

==== Final seasons (1987–88) with Red Sox ====
McNamara's 1987 Red Sox not only failed to repeat as divisional or league champions, but also they failed to reach .500. With only 78 wins, they finished 20 games behind the Detroit Tigers. McNamara was invited to return for 1988, and the Boston bullpen was buttressed by the acquisition of All-Star relief pitcher and future Hall of Famer Lee Smith. However, the Red Sox played well below expectations and were only 43–42, nine games behind the Tigers, by the All-Star break. McNamara was fired during the hiatus, and his interim successor, third-base coach "Walpole Joe" Morgan (not to be confused with Hall of Fame player Joe Morgan), promptly won 19 of his first 20 games as skipper to pull the Red Sox into a first-place tie with Detroit by August 3. They went on to win the division championship that season and Morgan was named permanent manager afterwards.

=== Cleveland Indians and California Angels ===
McNamara's managing career was not over, however. He spent 1989 as a Seattle Mariners scout, but on November 3, 1989, the Cleveland Indians hired him as their skipper for 1990. Under McNamara, the 1990 Indians improved by four games compared with the 1989 edition, going 77–85 and finishing fourth in the AL East, only 11 games behind the Red Sox. But in 1991, Cleveland took a major step backward; they won only 25 of 77 games under McNamara until his firing on July 5, and dropped 105 of 162 games that season.

McNamara returned to the Angels' organization as a minor league catching instructor, but was called to manage in the majors a final time in 1996 at age 64. He became interim pilot upon Marcel Lachemann's resignation on August 6, and had directed them to a 5–9 record when he was hospitalized for a blood clot in his leg on August 20. After coach Joe Maddon helmed the Angels for three weeks while he was treated, McNamara was able to return to the Angels and finish the 1996 season. He compiled a 10–18 overall record, and was eventually succeeded by Terry Collins for 1997.

=== Managerial record ===
The 1996 assignment concluded McNamara's managerial career. Over all or parts of 19 seasons, he had a record of 1,160–1,233 (.485).

Team	Year	Regular season					Postseason			
Team	Year	Games	Won	Lost	Win %	Finish	Won	Lost	Win %	Result
OAK	1969	13	8	5	.615	2nd in AL West	–	–	–	–
OAK	1970	162	89	73	.549	2nd in AL West	–	–	–	–
OAK total		175	97	78	.554		0	0	–	
SD	1974	162	60	102	.370	6th in NL West	–	–	–	–
SD	1975	162	71	91	.438	4th in NL West	–	–	–	–
SD	1976	162	73	89	.451	5th in NL West	–	–	–	–
SD	1977	48	20	28	.417	fired	–	–	–	–
SD total		534	224	310	.419		0	0	–	
CIN	1979	161	90	71	.559	1st in NL West	0	3	.000	Lost NLCS (PIT)
CIN	1980	162	89	73	.549	3rd in NL West	–	–	–	–
CIN	1981	56	35	21	.625	2nd in NL West	–	–	–	–
CIN	1981	52	31	21	.596	2nd in NL West	–	–	–	–
CIN	1982	92	34	58	.370	fired	–	–	–	–
CIN total		523	279	244	.533		0	3	.000	
CAL	1983	162	70	92	.432	5th in AL West	–	–	–	–
CAL	1984	162	81	81	.500	2nd in AL West	–	–	–	–
CAL	1996	28	10	18	.357	interim	–	–	–	–
CAL total		352	161	191	.457		0	0	–	
BOS	1985	162	81	81	.500	5th in AL East	–	–	–	–
BOS	1986	161	95	66	.590	1st in AL East	7	7	.500	Lost World Series (NYM)
BOS	1987	162	78	84	.481	5th in AL East	–	–	–	–
BOS	1988	85	43	42	.506	fired	–	–	–	–
BOS total		570	297	273	.521		7	7	.500	
CLE	1990	162	77	85	.475	4th in AL East	–	–	–	–
CLE	1991	77	25	52	.325	fired	–	–	–	–
CLE total		239	102	137	.427		0	0	–	
Total		2393	1160	1233	.485		7	10	.412	

== Personal life ==
McNamara married his first wife, Kathleen, at the start of his playing career. Together, they raised four children – three daughters (Peggy, Maureen, and Susan) and one son (Mike). He subsequently married Ellen Goode. The two of them moved to her hometown of Nashville, Tennessee, when McNamara retired from baseball. According to his obituary, in 1996 two of McNamara's young grandsons were killed by his son-in-law — their father — who then killed himself.

McNamara died aged 88 on July 28, 2020, at his home in Tennessee.

== See also ==
- List of Major League Baseball managers with most career wins
