= Geoff Combe =

American baseball player (born 1956)

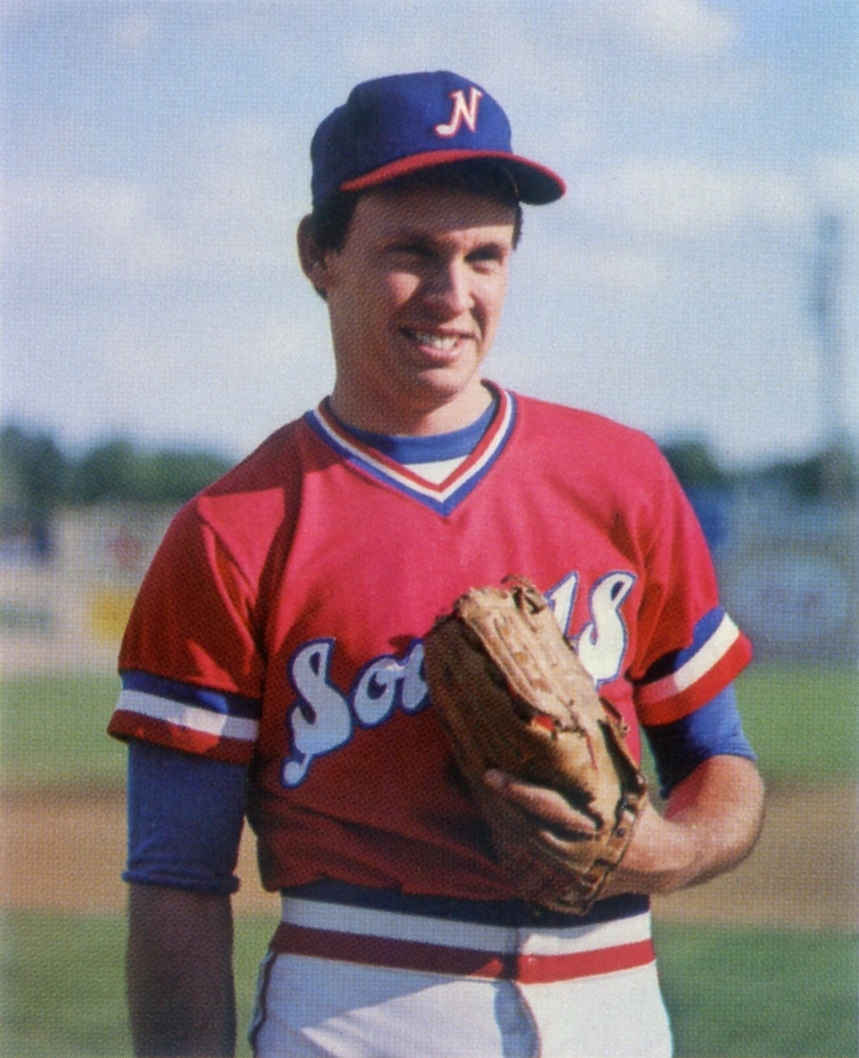
- Combe with the Nashville Sounds in 1979
- Pitcher
- Born: February 1, 1956 (age 69); Melrose, Massachusetts, U.S.
- Batted: Right Threw: Right

MLB debut
- September 2, 1980, for the Cincinnati Reds

Last MLB appearance
- October 2, 1981, for the Cincinnati Reds

MLB statistics
- Win–loss record: 1–0
- Earned run average: 8.51
- Strikeouts: 19
- Stats at Baseball Reference

Teams
- Cincinnati Reds (1980–1981)

Career highlights and awards
- 1979 Southern League All-Star; Broke Southern League record for saves with 27 in 1979.

Geoffrey Wade Combe (born February 1, 1956) is an American former professional baseball pitcher.

== Career ==
Combe was signed by the Cincinnati Reds of the Major League Baseball (MLB) as an amateur free agent in 1974. He made Minor League stops with Eugene, Tampa, Three Rivers, Nashville, and finally Indy before making it to the majors on September 2, 1980.

Combe had a series of solid seasons in the minors, starting with the Nashville Sounds of the Southern League in 1978 where he posted a 12–6 record and a 1.89 ERA in 66 games. His seven-year minor league career amounted to a record of 44–26 with an ERA of 2.31. In 1979 for the Sounds, he broke the league's record for saves with 27. He was rewarded for his efforts with a spot on the Southern League All-Star team.
