= Greg Minton =

American baseball player (born 1951)

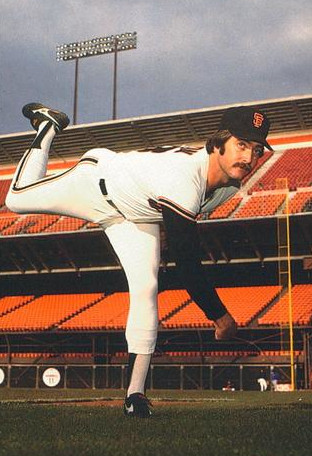
- Minton in 1983
- Pitcher
- Born: July 29, 1951 (age 74); Lubbock, Texas, U.S.
- Batted: Switch Threw: Right

MLB debut
- September 7, 1975, for the San Francisco Giants

Last MLB appearance
- September 29, 1990, for the California Angels

MLB statistics
- Win–loss record: 59–65
- Earned run average: 3.10
- Strikeouts: 479
- Saves: 150
- Stats at Baseball Reference

Teams
- San Francisco Giants (1975–1987); California Angels (1987–1990)

Career highlights and awards
- All-Star (1982); San Francisco Giants Wall of Fame

Gregory Brian Minton (born July 29, 1951), nicknamed "Moon Man", is an American former Major League Baseball (MLB) right-handed pitcher who played for the California Angels and San Francisco Giants. Minton had a 16-year major league career, from 1975 to 1990, and was a member of the 1982 National League All-Star Team.

== Career ==
A crippling injury in 1979 caused Minton to alter his delivery. Instead of using his high leg kick, Minton shortened his stride to take pressure off his knee. The new delivery gave Minton a 92-mph sinker that batters were unable to drive. Minton went three full seasons (269 1/3 innings) without allowing a home run until John Stearns homered against him on May 2, 1982. As of 2026, this is the longest such streak in the period for which game-by-game data is available (since 1904). Also in 1982, Minton appeared in his only All-Star Game and finished sixth in National League Cy Young Award voting. On August 14, 1986, Minton gave up the last of Pete Rose's MLB record 4,256 career hits.

In 1989, Minton made 62 appearances in relief. He earned eight saves and a 2.20 earned run average (ERA). Over portions of 1988 and 1989, he pitched another 105 2/3 consecutive innings without giving up a home run, which was the longest stretch of this type by any pitcher in Angels history. He signed a one-year extension for 1990 worth $850,000. He spent much of the 1990 season on the disabled list with elbow problems, and he pitched only 15 1/3 innings before announcing his retirement that October.

After his career as a player, Minton was a pitching coach in the California Angels organization and managed the independent Lubbock Crickets for two years.

== Personal ==
Minton's nickname, "Moon Man," stemmed from various escapades such as the hijacking of the team bus and the flooding of a minor league ballpark so he could leave Amarillo one day early at the end of the season.

Minton is married to Kari Jill Granville, a Phoenix attorney and former USA Archery team member.

== See also ==
- List of MLB individual streaks
