= Steve Howe (baseball) =

American baseball player (1958–2006)

- Howe in 1981
- Pitcher
- Born: March 10, 1958; Pontiac, Michigan, U.S.
- Died: April 28, 2006 (aged 48); Coachella, California, U.S.
- Batted: Left Threw: Left

MLB debut
- April 11, 1980, for the Los Angeles Dodgers

Last MLB appearance
- June 21, 1996, for the New York Yankees

MLB statistics
- Win–loss record: 47–41
- Earned run average: 3.03
- Strikeouts: 328
- Saves: 91
- Stats at Baseball Reference

Teams
- Los Angeles Dodgers (1980–1983, 1985); Minnesota Twins (1985); Texas Rangers (1987); New York Yankees (1991–1996)

Career highlights and awards
- All-Star (1982); World Series champion (1981); NL Rookie of the Year (1980)

Steven Roy Howe (March 10, 1958 – April 28, 2006) was an American professional baseball relief pitcher. He played 12 seasons in Major League Baseball (MLB) for the Los Angeles Dodgers, Minnesota Twins, Texas Rangers and New York Yankees, spanning 1980 to 1996. His baseball career ended in 1997 after a stint with the Sioux Falls Canaries of the independent Northern League.

A hard-throwing left-hander, Howe was the Rookie of the Year in 1980, saved the clinching game of the 1981 World Series, and was an All-Star in 1982. However, his career was derailed by problems with alcohol and cocaine abuse. He was suspended seven times by MLB for drug-policy violations, and in 1992 he received a lifetime ban from baseball that he was able to overturn with an appeal. After each disciplinary action, he returned to show flashes of his former brilliance. He died in a single-vehicle accident in 2006, after which an autopsy identified the presence of methamphetamine in his system.

== Baseball career ==
Born in Pontiac, Michigan, Howe played for Clarkston High School then went on to play college baseball at the University of Michigan in Ann Arbor. He was a two-time All-Big Ten selection.

He made his major league debut at the age of 22 in 1980 and was the National League Rookie of the Year that year, the second in a string of four Dodger rookies of the year (Rick Sutcliffe, Fernando Valenzuela, and Steve Sax). He saved 17 games during his ROY season, establishing a new rookie record. In the following strike-shortened season, Howe helped the Dodgers win the World Series over the New York Yankees.

Howe's career was plagued by alcohol and cocaine abuse; he first checked himself into a substance abuse clinic in 1983, but a relapse resulted in his suspension for the entire 1984 season. Over the course of his 17-year career, Howe was suspended seven times.

After briefly pitching for the Minnesota Twins and Texas Rangers and being out of the major leagues for four years, Howe signed with the Yankees, where he once again pitched effectively. However, in 1992, Howe became the second player to be banned from baseball for life because of substance abuse (the first was Ferguson Jenkins, who was also reinstated). He successfully appealed the ban and re-signed with the Yankees, where he had one final great season in 1994, recording 15 saves and a 1.80 earned run average as the Yankees' closer. He failed to repeat the performance the following year and was relegated to a setup role, and was released in June 1996 after posting an 0–1 record with a 6.35 ERA. Howe finished his career in 1997 playing with the Sioux Falls Canaries of the independent Northern League.

For his career, Howe posted a record of 47 wins, 41 losses, 91 saves, and a 3.03 ERA in 497 games.

== Autobiography ==
Howe published an autobiography in 1989, the middle of his baseball career. The book, Between the Lines: One Athlete's Struggle to Escape the Nightmare of Addiction (ISBN 9780940279254), described his chemical dependency and hope for recovery based upon his newfound commitment to evangelical Christianity. The book was co-written with Jim Greenfield, a lawyer from the Philadelphia area.

== After baseball ==
Following his retirement from baseball, Howe worked in Lake Havasu City, Arizona, as a self-employed framing contractor. His company's name was All Star Framing.

On April 28, 2006, Howe's pickup truck rolled over in Coachella, California, and he was killed. He was not wearing a seat belt at the time of the crash. The toxicology reports following his autopsy indicated he had methamphetamine in his system.

== See also ==
- List of people banned from Major League Baseball

== Published works ==
- Howe, Steve (1989). Between the Lines: One Athlete's Struggle to Escape the Nightmare of Addiction. With Jim Greenfield. Grand Rapids, MI: Masters Press. ISBN 9780940279254.
