= Scott Brown (baseball) =

American baseball player (1956–2026)

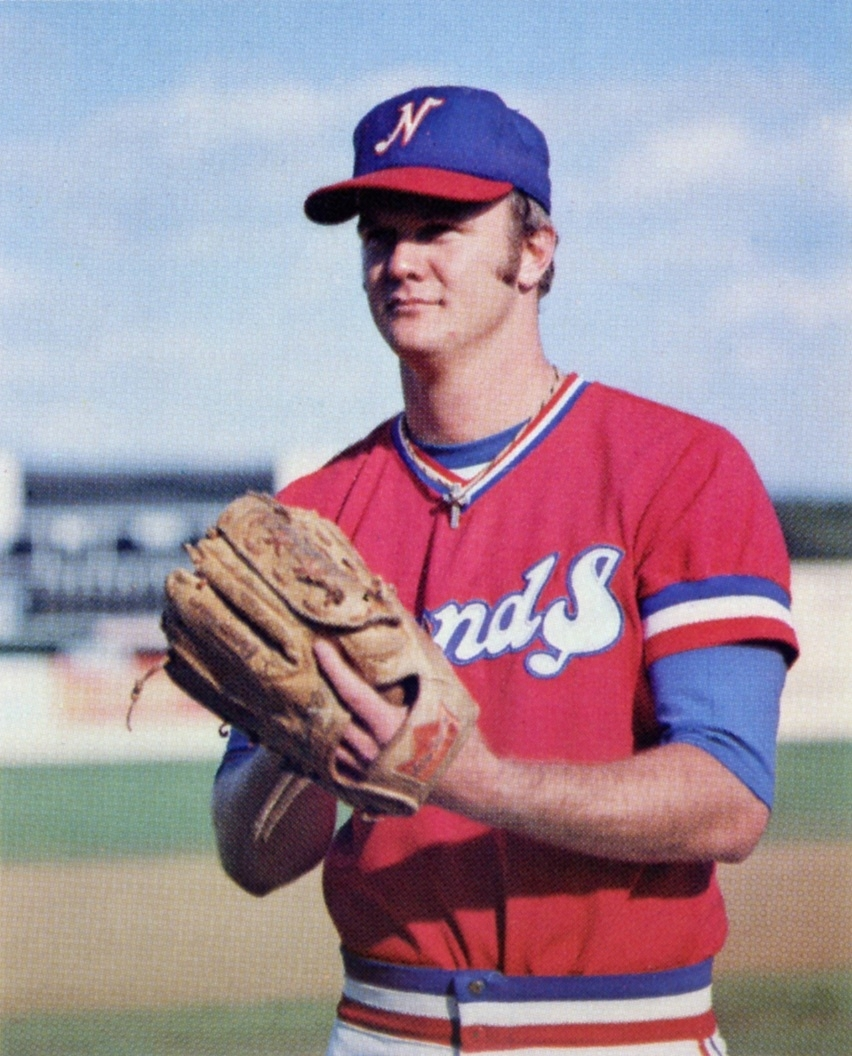
- Brown with the Nashville Sounds in 1979
- Pitcher
- Born: August 30, 1956; DeQuincy, Louisiana, U.S.
- Died: July 21, 2026 (aged 69); DeQuincy, Louisiana, U.S.
- Batted: Right Threw: Right

MLB debut
- August 11, 1981, for the Cincinnati Reds

Last MLB appearance
- October 2, 1981, for the Cincinnati Reds

MLB statistics
- Win–loss record: 1–0
- Earned run average: 2.77
- Strikeouts: 7
- Stats at Baseball Reference

Teams
- Cincinnati Reds (1981)

Scott Edward Brown (August 30, 1956 – July 21, 2026) was an American professional baseball pitcher. He played during one season in Major League Baseball (MLB) for the Cincinnati Reds. He was drafted by the Reds in the 4th round of the 1975 amateur draft. Brown played his first professional season with their Rookie league Billings Mustangs in 1975, and his last season with the Kansas City Royals' Triple-A affiliate, the Omaha Royals, in 1983.

Brown's only major league decision came on August 11, 1981, in his major league debut. Working 2 1/3 innings in scoreless relief, the official scorer awarded him with the win.

Brown died on July 21, 2026, at the age of 69.
