= Mike LaCoss =

American baseball player (born 1956)

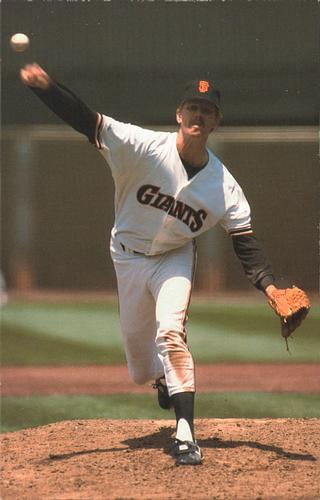
- Pitcher
- Born: May 30, 1956 (age 69); Glendale, California, U.S.
- Batted: Right Threw: Right

MLB debut
- July 18, 1978, for the Cincinnati Reds

Last MLB appearance
- July 2, 1991, for the San Francisco Giants

MLB statistics
- Win–loss record: 98–103
- Earned run average: 4.02
- Strikeouts: 783
- Stats at Baseball Reference

Teams
- Cincinnati Reds (1978–1981); Houston Astros (1982–1984); Kansas City Royals (1985); San Francisco Giants (1986–1991)

Career highlights and awards
- All-Star (1979)

Michael James LaCoss (born May 30, 1956) is an American former starting pitcher in Major League Baseball.

== Baseball career ==
=== Minor Leagues ===
LaCoss was drafted by the Cincinnati Reds in the third round of the 1974 amateur draft.

=== Cincinnati Reds ===
LaCoss made his major league debut in 1978, appearing in 18 games and recording an ERA of 4.50

LaCoss had a breakout season in 1979 for the division champion Reds, winning eight consecutive decisions at the start on his way to a 9–3 record and a berth on the National League All-Star team. LaCoss entered the game in the bottom of the sixth with the bases loaded and two outs. The American League squad had taken a 6–5 lead in the game and were threatening for more when LaCoss retired Don Baylor on a force play. LaCoss then pitched a scoreless seventh as the NL came back to win with single runs in the eighth and ninth. LaCoss went 5-5 for the remainder of 1979 on his way to a 14–8 record with an ERA of 3.50. After two seasons with less impressive results, LaCoss was placed on waivers and claimed by the Houston Astros.

=== Houston Astros ===
LaCoss bounced back in 1982, appearing in 41 games, mostly as a reliever and recording a 6–6 record with an ERA of 2.90. LaCoss appeared for two more years for the Astros before being granted free agency on November 8, 1984.

=== San Francisco Giants ===
LaCoss pitched a 10-inning complete game shutout against the Los Angeles Dodgers on August 16, 1987; as of 2021, he remains the last Giants pitcher to throw more than nine innings in a game. In 1987 he was ninth in the National League with 13 wins. He appeared in the earthquake-marred 1989 World Series with the Giants.

=== Career ===
An All-Star in 1979, LaCoss posted a 98–103 career record with 783 strikeouts and a 4.02 ERA in 1739 2/3 innings pitched.

LaCoss recorded two home runs his entire career, in consecutive at-bats in 1986. The first was off Dane Iorg, a utility player who entered the game to pitch for the San Diego Padres near the end of an 18–1 Giants blowout. The next came off Cincinnati Reds ace Tom Browning in the next game.

== Personal life ==
Mike owned and operated Mike LaCoss Enterprises Inc, YESS Foundation, and a website called ibaseballchannel.
