= Joe Price (pitcher) =

American baseball player (born 1956)

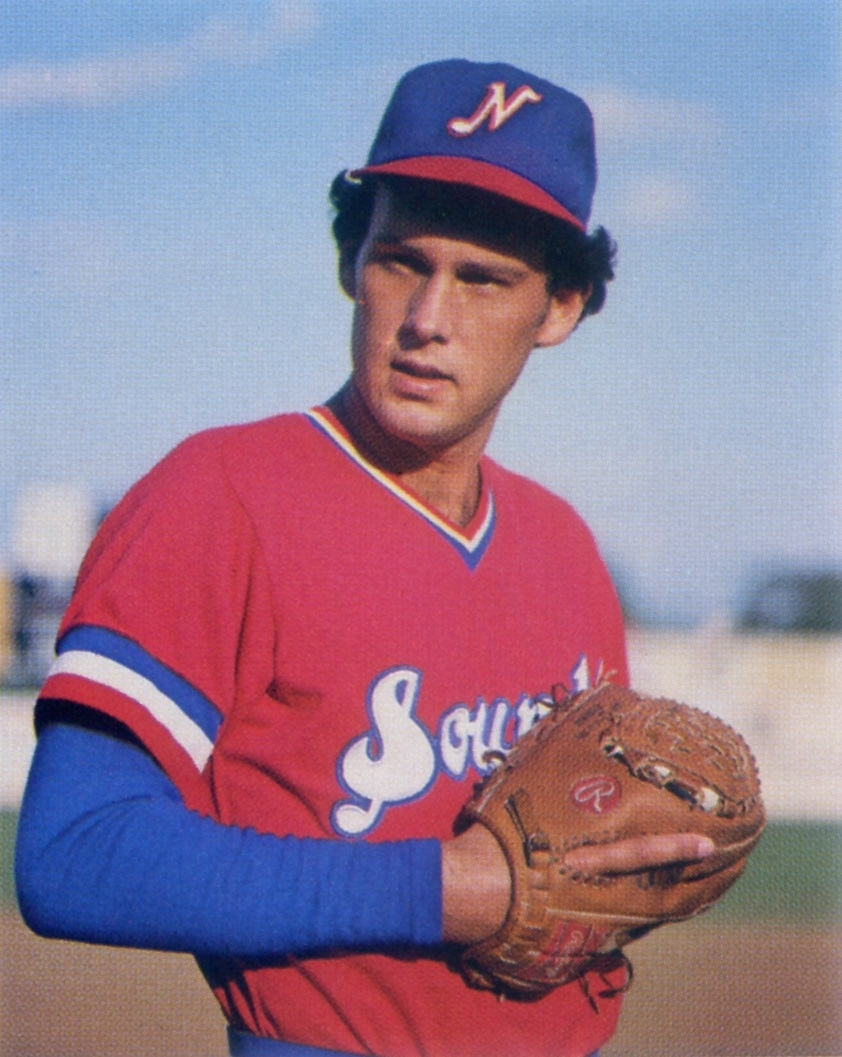
- Price with the Nashville Sounds in 1979
- Pitcher
- Born: November 29, 1956 (age 69); Inglewood, California, U.S.
- Batted: Right Threw: Left

MLB debut
- June 14, 1980, for the Cincinnati Reds

Last MLB appearance
- September 16, 1990, for the Baltimore Orioles

MLB statistics
- Win–loss record: 45–49
- Earned run average: 3.65
- Strikeouts: 657
- Stats at Baseball Reference

Teams
- Cincinnati Reds (1980–1986); San Francisco Giants (1987–1989); Boston Red Sox (1989); Baltimore Orioles (1990)

Joseph Walter Price (born November 29, 1956), is an American former professional baseball pitcher. He played in Major League Baseball (MLB) from 1980 to 1990. He played college baseball for Oklahoma State University from 1975 to 1976, and played for the University of Oklahoma in 1977. On June 7, 1977, Price was drafted by the Cincinnati Reds in the 4th round with the 102nd pick of the 1977 amateur draft.
