= Neil Fiala =

American baseball player (born 1956)

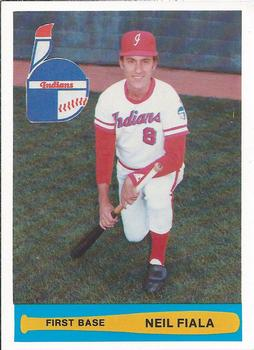
- Pinch hitter
- Born: August 24, 1956 (age 70); St. Louis, Missouri, U.S.
- Batted: Left Threw: Right

MLB debut
- September 3, 1981, for the St. Louis Cardinals

Last MLB appearance
- September 28, 1981, for the Cincinnati Reds

MLB statistics
- Batting average: .200
- Home runs: 0
- Runs batted in: 1
- Stats at Baseball Reference

Teams
- St. Louis Cardinals (1981); Cincinnati Reds (1981)

Neil Stephen Fiala (born August 24, 1956) is an American former Major League Baseball player. He played in five games in the majors in September 1981, all as a pinch hitter. He pinch-hit three times for the St. Louis Cardinals without a hit, then was traded to the Cincinnati Reds on September 10 along with pitcher Joe Edelen for veteran reliever Doug Bair.

In his first appearance for the Reds on September 16, Fiala got his one and only major league hit, a single against Mike Rowland of the San Francisco Giants. Fiala drove in one run with the hit, and scored another run later in the inning. Coincidentally, the player for whom he was pinch-hitting was Edelen. His final appearance came 12 days later—again pinch-hitting for Edelen—when he struck out against Alan Hargesheimer.

In the minor leagues, Fiala was used mostly as a second baseman. Originally drafted by the Cardinals in 1977, he retired following the 1982 season. From 2000 until 2002, Fiala served as manager for the River City Rascals of the independent Frontier League.

== Sources ==
- Career statistics from Baseball Reference · Baseball Reference (Minors) · Retrosheet · Baseball Almanac
