= Tom Hume =

American baseball player (born 1953)

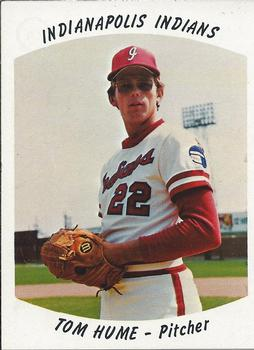
- Pitcher
- Born: March 29, 1953 (age 73); Cincinnati, Ohio, U.S.
- Batted: Right Threw: Right

MLB debut
- May 25, 1977, for the Cincinnati Reds

Last MLB appearance
- October 2, 1987, for the Cincinnati Reds

MLB statistics
- Win–loss record: 57–71
- Earned run average: 3.85
- Strikeouts: 536
- Saves: 92
- Stats at Baseball Reference

Teams
- Cincinnati Reds (1977–1985); Philadelphia Phillies (1986–1987); Cincinnati Reds (1987)

Career highlights and awards
- All-Star (1982)

Thomas Hubert Hume (born March 29, 1953) is an American former professional baseball pitcher, who played in Major League Baseball (MLB) for the Cincinnati Reds and Philadelphia Phillies, from 1977 to 1987. Hume was drafted by the Reds with the 16th pick in the 1st round of the 1972 amateur draft (secondary phase).

Hume came into his own in 1979 with the Reds when manager John McNamara started using him exclusively out of the bullpen in the latter part of July. Hume responded by recording 15 Saves over the last 10 weeks of the '79 season finishing runner-up to J. R. Richard of the Houston Astros for the National League lead with a 2.76 ERA.

Hume followed up his 1979 breakout season with perhaps the best season of his career in 1980. Hume finished with a 9-10 record, however posted a 2.56 ERA and recorded 25 saves, finishing a National League high 62 games. Hume was rewarded by being named the National League's Fireman of the Year by The Sporting News (sharing the award with Rollie Fingers).

Hume followed up his Fireman of the Year season by having another solid season in the strike shortened campaign of 1981, compiling a 9-4 record with a 3.46 ERA and chalking up 13 saves. Hume was off to a fast start to the 1982 season, heading into the All-Star break 3rd in the National League with 16 saves. Hume was named to the National League All-Star team and recorded the Save for the NL in a 4-1 victory over the American League.

Hume injured his knee and made his final appearance of the 1982 season on July 26, recording a save against the Cubs. 1983 and 1984 were lackluster seasons for Hume as he struggled to regain his form following knee surgery and could not regain his closer's role with the Reds.

Hume rebounded back to form in 1985 with a solid season as a setup man in the Reds bullpen. He was traded along with Gary Redus from the Reds to the Phillies for John Denny and Jeff Gray on December 11, 1985. Hume rewarded the Phillies with a solid 1986 season sporting a 4-1 record and 2.77 ERA in 46 appearances. Hume, however, slumped again in 1987 and was dealt back to the Reds in midseason, finishing out his career where he started.

== Coaching career ==
The 2006 season was Hume's 11th consecutive season as the Reds bullpen coach. He was serving as interim pitching coach because regular pitching coach Vern Ruhle was absent with cancer (Multiple myeloma). Ruhle died in January 2007. Prior to Ruhle's death, Dick Pole was signed to be the pitching coach for the Reds, and Ruhle was assigned to help with the minor leagues. Hume then went back to being the bullpen coach.
