= Joe Edelen =

American baseball player (born 1955)

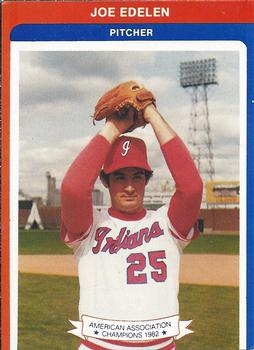
- Pitcher
- Born: September 16, 1955 (age 70); Durant, Oklahoma, U.S.
- Batted: Right Threw: Right

MLB debut
- April 18, 1981, for the St. Louis Cardinals

Last MLB appearance
- May 15, 1982, for the Cincinnati Reds

MLB statistics
- Win–loss record: 2–0
- Earned run average: 6.75
- Strikeouts: 26
- Stats at Baseball Reference

Teams
- St. Louis Cardinals (1981); Cincinnati Reds (1981–1982)

Benny Joe Edelen (born September 16, 1955) is an American former Major League Baseball relief pitcher who pitched for the St. Louis Cardinals and Cincinnati Reds and was touted as one of the all-time great high school athletes in the state of Oklahoma. A recipient of the Jim Thorpe award, Joe excelled in basketball and baseball receiving All-State and All-America honors in both sports. The Cardinals drafted him in the 1st round (12th pick) of the 1973 amateur draft and he debuted for them on April 18, 1981, against his future team, the Reds. During the 1981 season he was traded by the Cardinals with Neil Fiala to the Reds for Doug Bair. His major league career was brief as he pitched his final game the next year. He now teaches art and coaches golf at Washington Oklahoma.
