= Mario Soto (baseball) =

Dominican baseball player (born 1956)

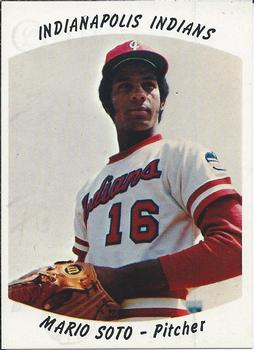
- Pitcher
- Born: July 12, 1956 (age 70); Baní, Dominican Republic
- Batted: Right Threw: Right

MLB debut
- July 21, 1977, for the Cincinnati Reds

Last MLB appearance
- June 16, 1988, for the Cincinnati Reds

MLB statistics
- Win–loss record: 100–92
- Earned run average: 3.47
- Strikeouts: 1,449
- Stats at Baseball Reference

Teams
- Cincinnati Reds (1977–1988)

Career highlights and awards
- 3× All-Star (1982–1984); Cincinnati Reds Hall of Fame

Mario Melvin Soto (born July 12, 1956) is a Dominican former pitcher, mostly as a starter, for the Cincinnati Reds of Major League Baseball (MLB) from 1977 through 1988. He currently works in the Reds' front office.

== Career ==
For most of his career, the Dominican right-hander was essentially a two-pitch pitcher. He possessed a hard fastball (clocked in the low-to-mid 90s) and complemented it with a baffling circle changeup, both thrown from the three-quarters position. Soto's changeup was particularly effective against left-handed hitters. On occasion, Soto would also throw a slider, which he turned to more in the latter stage of his career. He less frequently threw a curveball.

From 1980 to 1985, Soto struck out 1,063 batters.

On May 12, 1984, Soto came very close to throwing a no-hitter against the St. Louis Cardinals. However, with two out in the top of the ninth inning and the Reds up 1–0, outfielder George Hendrick spoiled the no-hitter with a game-tying solo home run. The Reds won the game for Soto in the bottom of the ninth, 2–1.

In 1983, Soto finished second in voting for the National League's Cy Young Award. Philadelphia's John Denny was the winner. Statistically, 1983 and 1984 were Soto's best seasons. He compiled a 35–20 record with a 2.92 earned run average and he established himself as the ace of the Cincinnati Reds' rotation. However, the Reds finished with losing records in both seasons.

In a 12-season career, all for Cincinnati, he was 100–92 with a 3.47 ERA in 297 games, 224 of them starts. He had 72 career complete games and 13 shutouts. He allowed 1,395 hits, 667 earned runs, 657 bases on balls and struck out 1,449 batters in 1,730 1/3 innings pitched. He also earned four saves (all during the 1980 season).

By 1986, Soto's performance had rapidly deteriorated due to shoulder injury. On April 29, 1986, against the Montreal Expos, Soto became the 11th pitcher in major league history to surrender four home runs in an inning.

== Controversy ==
On May 27, 1984, against the Chicago Cubs at Wrigley Field, third baseman Ron Cey hit what was originally ruled a home run down the left field line. Believing the ball had gone foul, Soto and Reds manager Vern Rapp disputed the call, and during the argument, Soto shoved third-base umpire Steve Rippley, who had made the call. After conferring, the umpires changed their decision and ruled it a foul ball, drawing a protest from the Cubs. However, for shoving Rippley, Soto was ejected, prompting him to charge the field. Cubs coach Don Zimmer stepped in front of Rippley to prevent Soto from attacking the umpire, only to himself be tackled by Soto and (inadvertently) catcher Brad Gulden, which triggered a 10-minute brawl. Four days later, National League president Chub Feeney suspended Mario Soto for five games.

In the second incident, on June 16, the Reds were playing the Atlanta Braves in Atlanta. Braves player Claudell Washington homered in the first inning off Soto. During Washington's second at-bat, Soto threw near Washington's chin and sent him to the ground, but Washington only stared at Soto. On Soto's first pitch of Washington's third at bat, Washington swung and let go of his bat in the direction of first base and walked toward the mound. Umpire Lanny Harris attempted to intervene, but Washington threw Harris to the ground as he lunged toward Soto. Soto punched Washington with the baseball in his hand, and both benches cleared. Reds catcher Dann Bilardello wrestled Washington to the ground and Soto threw the ball at Washington, but he struck Braves coach Joe Pignatano's shin instead. Soto was suspended five games and $5,000, and Washington received a three-game suspension and a $1,000 fine.

== Later years ==
In 2001, Soto was inducted into the Cincinnati Reds Hall of Fame and Museum. He has also worked with the team as a pitching coach, helping several Reds pitchers develop a change-up. As of 2024, Soto was working for the Reds' front office in Player Development. Soto is credited as the person who taught Edinson Vólquez and Johnny Cueto their change-ups, which have been go-to strikeout pitches in their careers.

== See also ==
- List of Major League Baseball single-inning strikeout leaders
- List of Major League Baseball players who spent their entire career with one franchise
