= Frank Pastore =

American baseball player (1957–2012)

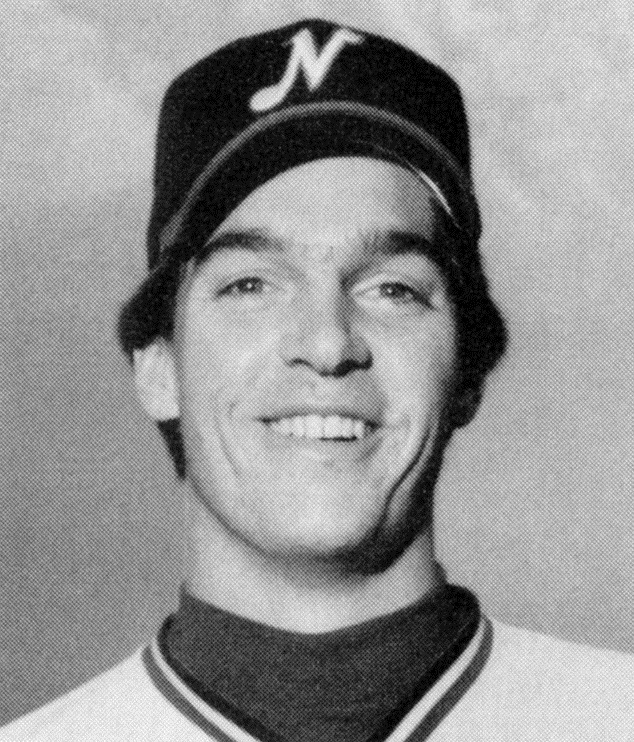
- Pastore with the Nashville Sounds in 1978
- Pitcher
- Born: August 21, 1957; Alhambra, California, U.S.
- Died: December 17, 2012 (aged 55); Upland, California, U.S.
- Batted: Right Threw: Right

MLB debut
- April 4, 1979, for the Cincinnati Reds

Last MLB appearance
- September 5, 1986, for the Minnesota Twins

MLB statistics
- Win–loss record: 48–58
- Earned run average: 4.29
- Strikeouts: 541
- Stats at Baseball Reference

Teams
- Cincinnati Reds (1979–1985); Minnesota Twins (1986)

Frank Enrico Pastore (/pəˈstɔːri/; August 21, 1957 – December 17, 2012) was an American Major League Baseball player and radio host. He pitched for the Cincinnati Reds from 1979 until 1985 and for the Minnesota Twins in 1986, and was in the Texas Rangers organization in 1987.

== Playing career ==
Frank Enrico Pastore was born in Alhambra, California, and was valedictorian of the 1975 class of Damien High School in La Verne, California. That year, Pastore went to the Cincinnati Reds in the second round of the amateur draft. Pastore continued to be promoted within the organization, with an impressive 3.28 ERA in the minor leagues. He made his major league debut on April 4, 1979, at Riverfront Stadium, pitching three scoreless innings in a loss to the San Francisco Giants. Used equally as a reliever and starter during his rookie season, he then moved full-time to the starting rotation in 1980.

Pastore's best statistical season came in 1980 with the Reds, as he posted a record of 13 - 7 with an ERA of 3.27 in 27 appearances. Pastore was hit on the elbow with a batted ball on June 4, 1984. That injury caused him to appear in only 41 games in the 1984 and 1985 seasons combined. He was then released by the Reds in 1986 following spring training. However, Pastore quickly signed with the Minnesota Twins, and spent the entire season coming out of the bullpen. Following the season, he signed with the Texas Rangers and was assigned to the AAA Oklahoma City 89ers. However, Pastore started four disappointing games with the team (compiling a 1–3 record and 8.46 ERA) before retiring.

== Later life ==
After baseball, Pastore went back to school, graduating with a degree in business administration from National University in 1989. He then spent the next two years with the national leadership of Athletes in Action, the sports ministry of Campus Crusade for Christ. He then attended the Talbot School of Theology at Biola University, graduating summa cum laude with an MA in philosophy of religion and ethics in 1994. In 2003, Pastore completed his second master's degree, in political philosophy and American government, from Claremont Graduate School.

On January 5, 2004, Pastore became the host of The Frank Pastore Show on KKLA-FM in Los Angeles, which became one of the largest Christian talk shows in the United States.

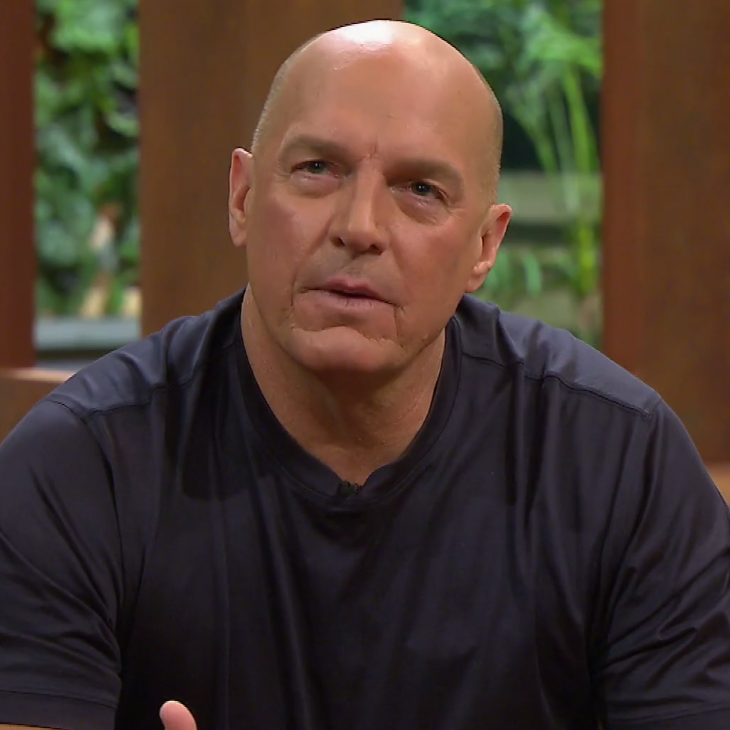
Pastore being interviewed about his book, Shattered: Struck Down, But Not Destroyed

In 2011, Pastore authored Shattered: Struck Down, But Not Destroyed, a book recounting how he became a born-again Christian during recovery from his 1984 pitching arm injury.

Pastore once held the record for the fastest time to finish eating the famous 72-oz steak dinner, "The Texas King", at the Big Texan Steak Ranch. Pastore's record of 9 minutes 30 seconds stood for 21 years, until being broken by Joey Chestnut in 2008.

== Death ==
On November 19, 2012, during his radio show while discussing how his faith affects his view of death, Pastore said:

You guys know I ride a motorcycle, don't you? So, at any moment, especially with the idiot people who cross the diamond lane into my lane, all right, without any blinkers -- not that I'm angry about it, but at any minute I could be spread out all over the 210 [Freeway].

That same day, he was critically injured on the Foothill (210) Freeway in Duarte, California, when a woman from Glendora, California, driving a Hyundai Sonata, collided with his Honda VTX 1800, throwing him off the motorcycle. He was hospitalized in critical condition with serious head injuries.

Less than a month later, on December 17, 2012, Pastore died from pneumonia and other complications of his injuries. Pastore was survived by his wife, Gina, children Frank Jr. and Christina, and three grandchildren.
