= 1980 Atlanta Braves season =

1980 Atlanta Braves
- League: National League
- Division: West
- Ballpark: Atlanta–Fulton County Stadium
- City: Atlanta
- Record: 81–80 (.503)
- Divisional place: 4th
- Owners: Ted Turner
- General managers: John Mullen
- Managers: Bobby Cox
- Television: WTBS/Superstation WTBS
- Radio: WSB (Ernie Johnson, Pete Van Wieren, Skip Caray)

The 1980 Atlanta Braves season was the 15th season in Atlanta along with the 110th season as a franchise overall.

== Offseason ==
- November 20, 1979: Relief pitcher Al Hrabosky signed as a free agent.
- December 5, 1979: Barry Bonnell, Pat Rockett, and Joey McLaughlin were traded by the Braves to the Toronto Blue Jays for Chris Chambliss and Luis Gómez.
- December 6, 1979: Adrian Devine and Pepe Frías were traded by the Braves to the Texas Rangers for Doyle Alexander, Larvell Blanks and $50,000.

== Regular season ==
On August 6, umpire Jerry Dale ruled that Braves shortstop Rafael Ramírez did not step on second base while turning a double play. Manager Bobby Cox argued the call and confronted Dale while tobacco juice streamed out of his mouth. Cox was accused of spitting on the umpire.

Phil Niekro became the only pitcher in the history of the National League to lead the NL in losses for four consecutive seasons.

=== Season standings ===
NL West
Team	W	L	Pct.	GB	Home	Road
Houston Astros	93	70	.571	—	55‍–‍26	38‍–‍44
Los Angeles Dodgers	92	71	.564	1	55‍–‍27	37‍–‍44
Cincinnati Reds	89	73	.549	3½	44‍–‍37	45‍–‍36
Atlanta Braves	81	80	.503	11	50‍–‍30	31‍–‍50
San Francisco Giants	75	86	.466	17	44‍–‍37	31‍–‍49
San Diego Padres	73	89	.451	19½	45‍–‍36	28‍–‍53

=== Record vs. opponents ===
1980 National League record Sources:
Team	ATL	CHC	CIN	HOU	LAD	MON	NYM	PHI	PIT	SD	SF	STL
Atlanta	—	8–4	2–16	7–11	11–7	5–7	3–9	5–7	11–1	12–6	11–6	6–6
Chicago	4–8	—	7–5	1–11	5–7	6–12	10–8	5–13	8–10	4–8	5–7	9–9
Cincinnati	16–2	5–7	—	8–10	9–9	3–9	8–4	7–5	6–6	15–3–1	7–11	5–7
Houston	11–7	11–1	10–8	—	9–10	5–7	8–4	3–9	7–5	11–7	11–7	7–5
Los Angeles	7–11	7–5	9–9	10–9	—	11–1	7–5	6–6	6–6	9–9	13–5	7–5
Montreal	7–5	12–6	9–3	7–5	1–11	—	10–8	9–9	6–12	10–2	7–5	12–6
New York	9–3	8–10	4–8	4–8	5–7	8–10	—	6–12	10–8	1–11	3–9	9–9
Philadelphia	7-5	13–5	5–7	9–3	6–6	9–9	12–6	—	7–11	8–4	6–6	9–9
Pittsburgh	1–11	10–8	6–6	5–7	6–6	12–6	8–10	11–7	—	6–6	8–4	10–8
San Diego	6–12	8–4	3–15–1	7–11	9–9	2–10	11–1	4–8	6–6	—	10–8	7–5
San Francisco	6–11	7–5	11–7	7–11	5–13	5–7	9–3	6–6	4–8	8–10	—	7–5
St. Louis	6–6	9–9	7–5	5–7	5–7	6–12	9–9	9–9	8–10	5–7	5–7	—

=== Notable transactions ===
- June 3, 1980: Ken Dayley was drafted by the Braves in the 1st round (3rd pick) of the 1980 Major League Baseball draft.
- July 1, 1980: Bill Haselrig (minors) was traded by the Braves to the New York Mets for Randy Johnson.
- August 8, 1980: Larvell Blanks was released by the Braves.

=== Game log ===
1980 Game Log (81–80)
April (6–11)

#	Date	Opponent	Score	Win	Loss	Save	Attendance	Record
1	April 9	@ Reds	0–9	Pastore (1–0)	**Niekro** (0–1)		51,774	0–1
2	April 11	@ Reds	0–6 (6)	LaCoss (1–0)	**McWilliams** (0–1)		12,902	0–2
3	April 12	@ Reds	4–5	Hume (1–0)	**Hrabosky** (0–1)		11,839	0–3
4	April 13	@ Reds	0–5	Leibrandt (1–0)	**Niekro** (0–2)		32,996	0–4
5	April 14	@ Astros	4–5	Sambito (1–0)	**Garber** (0–1)		15,017	0–5
6	April 15	@ Astros	2–6	Niekro (1–0)	**McWilliams** (0–2)		15,712	0–6
7	April 17	Reds	1–4	Pastore (2-0)	**Niekro** (0–3)		15,742	0–7
8	April 18	Reds	3–0	**Matula** (1–0)	Leibrandt (1–1)		5,624	1–7
9	April 19	Reds	1–6	Bonham (1–0)	**Alexander** (0–1)		9,684	1–8
10	April 20	Reds	3–5	Tomlin (2–0)	**Bradford** (0–1)	Hume (1)	8,002	1–9
11	April 22	Padres	3–2 (10)	**Hrabosky** (1–1)	Shirley (0–1)		4,710	2–9
12	April 23	Padres	2–1	**Matula** (2–0)	Jones (1–2)	**Hrabosky** (1)	4,166	3–9
13	April 24	Padres	8–7	**Garber** (1–1)	Fingers (2–1)		4,498	4–9
14	April 25	Expos	8–7 (11)	**Bradford** (1–1)	Bahnsen (0–1)		6,929	5–9
15	April 26	Expos	3–4	Grimsley (1–1)	**Niekro** (0–4)	Fryman (2)	13,705	5–10
16	April 27	Expos	6–3	**McWilliams** (1–2)	Sanderson (1–2)	**Hrabosky** (2)	12,917	6–10
–	April 28	@ Padres	Postponed (rain); Makeup: June 28					
–	April 29	@ Padres	Postponed (rain); Makeup: September 21					
17	April 30	@ Padres	1–2	Rasmussen (1–2)	**Matula** (2–1)	Shirley (3)	9,018	6–11

May (11–15)

#	Date	Opponent	Score	Win	Loss	Save	Attendance	Record
18	May 1	@ Padres	3–4	Shirley (1–1)	**Camp** (0–1)		12,131	6–12
19	May 2	@ Pirates	6–1	**Niekro** (1–4)	Rooker (2–2)		11,476	7–12
20	May 3	@ Pirates	3–1 (10)	**Hrabosky** (1–1)	Jackson (2–1)		34,104	8–12
21	May 4	@ Pirates	4–13	Bibby (4–0)	**Boggs** (0–1)		14,358	8–13
22	May 5	@ Phillies	1–7	Carlton (5–1)	**Matula** (2–2)		26,165	8–14
23	May 6	@ Phillies	5–10	Ruthven (2–2)	**Alexander** (0–2)	Noles (2)	25,302	8–15
–	May 7	@ Phillies	Postponed (rain); Makeup: July 25 as a traditional double-header					
24	May 9	Astros	5–4	**McWilliams** (2–2)	Forsch (4–1)	**Bradford** (1)	11,111	9–15
25	May 10	Astros	2–3 (11)	LaCorte (2–0)	**Garber** (1–2)	Sambito (3)	13,798	9–16
26	May 11	Astros	7–4	**Niekro** (2–4)	Niekro (4–2)		10,871	10–16
27	May 13	Phillies	7–3	**Alexander** (1–2)	Lerch (0–5)	**Camp** (1)	10,146	11–16
28	May 14	Phillies	1–9	Carlton (6–2)	**McWilliams** (2–3)		4,625	11–17
29	May 16	Mets	3–5	Falcone (2–2)	**Niekro** (2–5)	Allen (6)	6,135	11–18
30	May 18 (1)	Mets	2–1	**Matula** (3–2)	Zachry (0–2)	**Camp** (2)	–	12–18
31	May 18 (2)	Mets	1–2	Allen (1–3)	**Garber** (1–3)		11,807	12–19
32	May 19	@ Expos	8–11	Palmer (3–0)	**McWilliams** (2–4)	Fryman (7)	20,656	12–20
33	May 20	@ Expos	1–0	**Niekro** (3–5)	Sanderson (3–3)		11,071	13–20
34	May 21	@ Expos	2–3	Rogers (4–4)	**Garber** (1–4)		13,606	13–21
35	May 23	@ Mets	1–2	Burris (3–3)	**Matula** (3–3)	Allen (8)	7,864	13–22
36	May 24	@ Mets	4–5 (10)	Allen (2–3)	**Camp** (0–2)		7,221	13–23
37	May 25	@ Mets	0–3	Swan (3–3)	**Niekro** (3–6)		13,624	13–24
38	May 26	Giants	2–1	**Boggs** (1–1)	Minton (1–2)	**Bradford** (2)	5,822	14–24
39	May 27	Giants	6–3	**McWilliams** (3–4)	Knepper (3–6)	**Garber** (1)	5,277	15–24
40	May 28	Giants	3–2 (12)	**Hrabosky** (2–1)	Lavelle (0–5)		5,500	16–24
41	May 29	@ Dodgers	0–3	Welch (5–1)	**Niekro** (3–7)		24,630	16–25
42	May 30	@ Dodgers	4–8	Hooton (5–3)	**Matula** (3–4)		32,200	16–26
43	May 31	@ Dodgers	6–5	**Boggs** (2–1)	Reuss (6–1)	**Garber** (2)	40,161	17–26

June (15–13)

#	Date	Opponent	Score	Win	Loss	Save	Attendance	Record
44	June 1	@ Dodgers	9–5	**Alexander** (2–2)	Goltz (3–4)	**Camp** (3)	49,320	18–26
45	June 2	@ Giants	4–2	**Niekro** (4–7)	Whitson (2–6)		3,768	19–26
46	June 3	@ Giants	2–3	Minton (2–2)	**Bradford** (1–2)		9,294	19–27
47	June 4	@ Giants	7–2	**Matula** (4–4)	Montefusco (2–5)		5,593	20–27
48	June 6	Dodgers	0–5	Reuss (7–1)	**Niekro** (4–8)		18,331	20–28
49	June 7	Dodgers	6–1	**Alexander** (3–2)	Goltz (3–5)		25,723	21–28
50	June 8	Dodgers	1–3	Sutton (5–2)	**Boggs** (2–2)	Sutcliffe (4)	12,543	21–29
51	June 9	Cardinals	5–8 (10)	Littlefield (1–0)	**Bradford** (1–3)	Frazier	6,513	21–30
52	June 10	Cardinals	5–2	**Niekro** (5–8)	Sykes (1–5)		6,763	22–30
53	June 11	Cardinals	3–4 (10)	Forsch (6–4)	**Bradford** (1–4)	Seaman (1)	6,755	22–31
54	June 13	@ Cubs	7–6	**Alexander** (4–2)	McGlothen (3–3)	**Garber** (3)	14,470	23–31
55	June 14	@ Cubs	5–10	Lamp (6–6)	**Niekro** (5–9)		25,108	23–32
56	June 15	@ Cubs	1–4	Krukow (4–7)	**Matula** (4–5)	Sutter (13)	11,421	23–33
57	June 16	@ Cardinals	6–3	**Boggs** (3–2)	Forsch (6–5)		16,809	24–33
58	June 17	@ Cardinals	2–3	Vuckovich (6–5)	**Alexander** (4–3)		13,524	24–34
59	June 18 (1)	Pirates	3–2	**Garber** (2–4)	Tekulve (5–4)		–	25–34
60	June 18 (2)	Pirates	5–4	**Camp** (1–2)	Romo (3–3)	**Garber** (4)	17,154	26–34
61	June 19	Pirates	4–3	**Matula** (5–5)	Robinson (2–3)	**Bradford** (3)	10,585	27–34
62	June 20	Cubs	2–4	McGlothen (4–4)	**Boggs** (3–3)	Sutter (16)	10,273	27–35
63	June 21	Cubs	8–0	**Alexander** (5–3)	Hernandez (1–6)		14,516	28–35
64	June 22	Cubs	2–3	Lamp (8–6)	**Niekro** (5–10)	Tidrow (3)	15,070	28–36
65	June 24	@ Reds	2–8	Leibrandt (7–4)	**McWilliams** (3–5)		22,682	28–37
66	June 25	@ Reds	3–15	Seaver (3–4)	**Matula** (5–6)		32,603	28–38
67	June 27	@ Padres	5–3	**Camp** (2–2)	Curtis (3–6)	**Garber** (5)	15,303	29–38
68	June 28 (1)	@ Padres	5–4	**Bradford** (2–4)	Shirley (5–4)	**Garber** (6)	–	30–38
69	June 28 (2)	@ Padres	2–3	D'Acquisto (2–1)	**Camp** (2–3)		17,554	30–39
70	June 29	@ Padres	4–2	**McWilliams** (4–5)	Rasmussen (1–7)		11,938	31–39
71	June 30	Astros	5–4	**Hrabosky** (3–1)	Sambito (2–1)		8,208	32–39

July (14–15)

#	Date	Opponent	Score	Win	Loss	Save	Attendance	Record
72	July 1	Astros	13–4	**Alexander** (5–3)	Niekro (8–7)		9,546	33–39
73	July 2	Astros	14–0	**Niekro** (6–10)	Ruhle (5–2)		21,908	34–39
74	July 3	Astros	3–5	Richard (10–4)	**Boggs** (3–4)	LaCorte (7)	15,769	34–40
75	July 4	Padres	9–0	**McWilliams** (5–5)	Rasmussen (1–8)		46,071	35–40
76	July 5	Padres	3–2	**Matula** (6–6)	Fingers (7–7)		18,932	36–40
77	July 6	Padres	6–5	**Alexander** (6–3)	Shirley (5–6)	**Niekro** (1)	14,302	37–40
–	July 8	**1980 Major League Baseball All-Star Game at Dodger Stadium in Los Angeles**						
78	July 10	Reds	6–8	Moskau	**Niekro**		19,177	37–41
79	July 11	Reds	3–5	Soto	**Alexander**	Hume	26,139	37–42
80	July 12	@ Astros	5–9	Niekro	**McWilliams**	Smith	38,610	37–43
81	July 13 (1)	@ Astros	5–6	Sambito	**Garber**	LaCorte	–	37–44
82	July 13 (2)	@ Astros	1–6	Ruhle	**Boggs**		31,230	37–45
83	July 14	@ Astros	2–0	**Niekro**	Pladson		20,247	38–45
84	July 15	Mets	2–9	Zachry	**Alexander**		21,608	38–46
85	July 16	Mets	5–2	**McWilliams**	Swan		5,414	39–46
86	July 17	Mets	0–6	Pacella	**Matula**		7,107	39–47
87	July 18	Phillies	2–7	Espinosa	**Niekro**	Noles	13,908	39–48
88	July 19 (1)	Phillies	5–2	**Alexander**	Ruthven		–	40–48
89	July 19 (2)	Phillies	7–2	**Boggs**	Larson	**Camp**	35,524	41–48
90	July 20	Phillies	3–2	**McWilliams**	Walk		9,335	42–48
91	July 21	Expos	6–8	Sanderson	**Matula**	Sosa	6,894	42–49
92	July 22	Expos	7–5	**Niekro**	Bahnsen	**Camp**	37,108	43–49
93	July 23	Expos	6–5	**Camp**	Gullickson		10,873	44–49
94	July 25 (1)	@ Phillies	4–5 (12)	Ruthven	**Camp**		–	44–50
95	July 25 (2)	@ Phillies	3–0	**Boggs**	Larson		38,408	45–50
96	July 26	@ Phillies	3–6	Walk	**Niekro**	Reed	33,112	45–51
97	July 27	@ Phillies	4–17	Carlton	**Matula**		35,249	45–52
98	July 28	@ Mets	6–3	**Alexander**	Falcone		12,737	46–52
99	July 29	@ Mets	1–2	Bomback	**McWilliams**	Allen	9,512	46–53
100	July 30	@ Mets	0–3	Zachry	**Boggs**		16,561	46–54

August (19–11)

#	Date	Opponent	Score	Win	Loss	Save	Attendance	Record
101	August 1	@ Expos	1–4	Sanderson (11–5)	**Niekro** (8–14)		30,168	46–55
102	August 2	@ Expos	1–5	Norman (2–1)	**Alexander** (9–6)		41,785	46–56
103	August 3	@ Expos	5–6	Lea (3–5)	**McWilliams** (5–8)	Sosa (8)	38,356	46–57
104	August 4	Dodgers	3–5	Reuss (12–4)	**Boggs** (5–7)	Stanhouse (2)	30,330	46–58
105	August 5	Dodgers	6–4	**Camp** (4–4)	Stanhouse (0–2)		10,187	47–58
106	August 6	Dodgers	2–6	Sutton (8–3)	**Matula** (6–10)	Castillo (4)	9,441	47–59
107	August 7	Dodgers	4–3	**Alexander** (10–6)	Welch (10–7)	**Camp** (6)	10,056	48–59
108	August 8	Giants	7–3	**McWilliams** (6–8)	Minton (3–4)		9,014	49–59
109	August 9	Giants	4–5	Holland (4–2)	**Boggs** (5–8)	Minton (11)	17,906	49–60
110	August 10	Giants	3–1	**Niekro** (9–14)	Hargesheimer (2–2)	**Camp** (7)	9,027	50–60
111	August 11	@ Dodgers	3–2	**Matula** (7–10)	Sutton (8–4)	**Camp** (8)	32,118	51–60
112	August 12	@ Dodgers	7–6	**Garber** (3–5)	Sutcliffe (3–8)	**Camp** (9)	35,905	52–60
113	August 13	@ Dodgers	2–0	**Boggs** (6–8)	Hooton (10–5)		36,345	53–60
114	August 14	@ Giants	1–5	Hargesheimer (3–2)	**McWilliams** (6–9)	Minton (13)	5,448	53–61
115	August 15	@ Giants	8–2 (13)	**Garber** (4–5)	Lavelle (5–6)		10,556	54–61
116	August 16	@ Giants	1–2	Blue (11–6)	**Matula** (7–11)		14,634	54–62
117	August 17	@ Giants	8–2	**Alexander** (11–6)	Ripley (6–6)		21,029	55–62
118	August 19	Cubs	5–4 (11)	**Niekro** (10–14)	Tidrow (5–4)		9,485	56–62
119	August 20	Cubs	9–5	**McWilliams** (7–9)	McGlothen (9–8)		7,549	57–62
120	August 21	Cubs	6–4	**Niekro** (11–14)	Krukow (8–13)	**Camp** (10)	9,617	58–62
121	August 22	Cardinals	4–7	Fulgham (4–6)	**Matula** (7–12)		11,854	58–63
122	August 23	Cardinals	7–2	**Alexander** (12–6)	Vuckovich (9–9)		21,099	59–63
123	August 24	Cardinals	10–5	**Boggs** (7–8)	Martínez (4–8)		12,512	60–63
124	August 25	@ Pirates	8–6	**Hanna** (1–0)	Bibby (15–4)	**Bradford** (4)	15,657	61–63
125	August 26	@ Pirates	4–2 (10)	**Garber** (5–5)	Tekulve (8–6)		14,695	62–63
126	August 27	@ Pirates	7–4	**Matula** (8–12)	Robinson (5–7)	**Hrabosky** (3)	12,363	63–63
127	August 28	@ Cardinals	2–11	Forsch (10–7)	**Alexander** (12–7)		7,203	63–64
128	August 29	@ Cardinals	4–3	**Boggs** (8–8)	Martínez (4–9)	**Camp** (11)	11,551	64–64
129	August 30	@ Cardinals	3–5	Hood (4–5)	**McWilliams** (7–10)	Urrea (1)	19,681	64–65
130	August 31	@ Cardinals	6–2	**Niekro** (12–14)	Otten (0–5)		27,821	65–65

September (15–11)

#	Date	Opponent	Score	Win	Loss	Save	Attendance	Record
131	September 1	@ Cubs	5–2	**Matula** (9–12)	Lamp (10–11)	**Camp** (12)	11,647	66–65
132	September 2	@ Cubs	10–5	**Alexander** (13–7)	Krukow (8–14)		4,013	67–65
133	September 3	@ Cubs	4–3	**Boggs** (9–8)	McGlothen (9–11)	**Camp** (13)	1,480	68–65
134	September 5	Pirates	7–4	**Camp** (5–4)	Tekulve (8–8)		29,610	69–65
135	September 6	Pirates	3–2	**Niekro** (13–14)	Blyleven (7–11)	**Garber** (7)	17,821	70–65
136	September 7	Pirates	6–5	**Bradford** (3–4)	Tekulve (8–9)	**Camp** (14)	19,762	71–65
137	September 8	Reds	1–6	Pastore (11–6)	**Alexander** (13–8)		15,951	71–66
138	September 9	Reds	1–7	Soto (9–5)	**Boggs** (9–9)		14,165	71–67
139	September 10	Reds	0–3	Seaver (8–7)	**McWilliams** (7–11)		10,516	71–68
140	September 12	Padres	6–2	**Niekro** (14–14)	Eichelberger (4–1)	**Camp** (15)	8,881	72–68
141	September 13	Padres	5–3	**Matula** (10–12)	Wise (6–7)	**Camp** (16)	12,990	73–68
142	September 14	Padres	4–3	**Camp** (6–4)	Lucas (5–8)		9,270	74–68
143	September 15	Dodgers	9–0	**Boggs** (10–9)	Hooton (13–6)		8,025	75–68
144	September 16	Dodgers	2–1	**Niekro** (15–14)	Goltz (7–8)	**Camp** (17)	31,279	76–68
145	September 17	@ Giants	0–2	Blue (14–8)	**McWilliams** (7–12)		2,164	76–69
146	September 18	@ Giants	2–1	**Matula** (11–12)	Hargesheimer (4–5)	**Camp** (18)	2,151	77–69
147	September 19	@ Padres	4–7	Mura (7–7)	**Alexander** (13–9)	Fingers (22)	5,893	77–70
148	September 20	@ Padres	2–3 (11)	Rasmussen (4–10)	**Hrabosky** (4–2)		7,180	77–71
149	September 21	@ Padres	1–3	Tellmann (1–0)	**Niekro** (15–15)		2,846	77–72
150	September 22	@ Dodgers	7–2	**Hanna** (2–0)	Sutton (12–5)	**Camp** (19)	25,078	78–72
151	September 23	@ Dodgers	2–4	Welch (14–9)	**Matula** (11–13)	Stanhouse (7)	29,226	78–73
152	September 24	Astros	4–2	**Alexander** (14–9)	Andújar (3–7)	**Camp** (20)	24,897	79–73
153	September 25	Astros	2–4	Ryan (10–9)	**Niekro** (15–16)	Smith (8)	7,926	79–74
154	September 26	Giants	5–3	**Boggs** (11–9)	Blue (14–10)	**Camp** (21)	6,578	80–74
155	September 27	Giants	1–2	Ripley (9–9)	**McWilliams** (7–13)	Lavelle (9)	19,486	80–75
156	September 30	@ Astros	3–7	Ryan (11–9)	**Alexander** (14–10)	Smith (10)	31,973	80–76

October (1–4)

#	Date	Opponent	Score	Win	Loss	Save	Attendance	Record
157	October 1	@ Astros	2–5	Ruhle (12–4)	**Niekro** (15–17)		35,600	80–77
158	October 2	@ Astros	2–3	Niekro (19–12)	**McWilliams** (7–14)	LaCorte (11)	45,022	80–78
159	October 3	@ Reds	4–1	**Boggs** (12–9)	Soto (10–8)	**Camp** (22)	18,868	81–78
160	October 4	@ Reds	2–3	Pastore (13–7)	**Alexander** (14–11)		14,376	81–79
161	October 5	@ Reds	0–1	Price (7–3)	**Niekro** (15–18)	Hume (25)	30,478	81–80

Legend: = Win = Loss = Postponement
Bold = Braves team member

=== Roster ===
1980 Atlanta Braves
**Roster**
**Pitchers**: 33 Doyle Alexander; 40 Tommy Boggs; 34 Larry Bradford; 37 Rick Camp; 26 Gene Garber; 49 Preston Hanna; 39 Al Hrabosky; 42 Rick Mahler; 29 Rick Matula; 27 Larry McWilliams; 35 Phil Niekro	**Catchers**: 20 Bruce Benedict; 15 Bill Nahorodny; 11 Joe Nolan; 4 Biff Pocoroba; **Infielders**: 16 Larvell Blanks; 10 Chris Chambliss; 9 Luis Gómez; 5 Bob Horner; 17 Glenn Hubbard; 47 Rafael Ramírez; 1 Jerry Royster; 14 Chico Ruiz	**Outfielders**: 30 Brian Asselstine; 7 Jeff Burroughs; 22 Gary Cooper; 19 Terry Harper; 28 Mike Lum; 36 Gary Matthews; 45 Eddie Miller; 3 Dale Murphy; 46 Charlie Spikes	**Manager**: 6 Bobby Cox; **Coaches**: 23 Tommie Aaron; 48 Cloyd Boyer; 10 Bobby Dews; 8 John Sullivan

== Player stats ==
=== Batting ===
==== Starters by position ====
Note: Pos = Position; G = Games played; AB = At bats; H = Hits; Avg. = Batting average; HR = Home runs; RBI = Runs batted in

Pos	Player	G	AB	H	Avg.	HR	RBI
C	Bruce Benedict	120	359	91	.253	2	34
1B	Chris Chambliss	158	602	170	.282	18	72
2B	Glenn Hubbard	117	431	107	.248	9	43
SS	Luis Gómez	121	278	53	.191	0	24
3B	Bob Horner	124	463	124	.268	35	89
LF	Jeff Burroughs	99	278	73	.263	13	51
CF	Dale Murphy	156	569	160	.281	33	89
RF	Gary Matthews	155	571	159	.278	19	75

==== Other batters ====
Note: G = Games played; AB = At bats; H = Hits; Avg. = Batting average; HR = Home runs; RBI = Runs batted in

Player	G	AB	H	Avg.	HR	RBI
Jerry Royster	123	392	95	.242	1	20
Larvell Blanks	88	221	45	.204	2	12
Brian Asselstine	87	218	62	.284	3	25
Rafael Ramírez	50	165	44	.267	2	11
Bill Nahorodny	59	157	38	.242	5	18
Mike Lum	93	83	17	.205	0	5
Biff Pocoroba	70	83	22	.265	2	8
Terry Harper	21	54	10	.185	0	3
Charlie Spikes	41	36	10	.278	0	2
Chico Ruiz	25	26	8	.308	0	2
Joe Nolan	17	22	6	.273	0	2
Eddie Miller	11	19	3	.158	0	0
Gary Cooper	21	2	0	.000	0	0

=== Pitching ===
==== Starting pitchers ====
Note: G = Games pitched; IP = Innings pitched; W = Wins; L = Losses; ERA = Earned run average; SO = Strikeouts

Player	G	IP	W	L	ERA	SO
Phil Niekro	40	275.0	15	18	3.63	176
Doyle Alexander	35	231.2	14	11	4.20	114
Tommy Boggs	32	192.1	12	9	3.42	84
Rick Matula	33	176.2	11	13	4.58	62
Larry McWilliams	30	163.2	9	14	4.95	77

==== Relief pitchers ====
Note: G = Games pitched; W = Wins; L = Losses; SV = Saves; ERA = Earned run average; SO = Strikeouts

Player	G	W	L	SV	ERA	SO
Rick Camp	77	6	4	22	1.91	33
Gene Garber	68	5	5	7	3.83	51
Larry Bradford	56	3	4	4	2.44	32
Al Hrabosky	45	4	2	3	3.62	31
Preston Hanna	32	2	0	0	3.18	35
Rick Mahler	2	0	0	0	2.45	1

== Farm system ==
Level	Team	League	Manager
AAA	Richmond Braves	International League	Fred Hatfield
AA	Savannah Braves	Southern League	Eddie Haas
A	Durham Bulls	Carolina League	Al Gallagher
A	Anderson Braves	South Atlantic League	Sonny Jackson
Rookie	GCL Braves	Gulf Coast League	Pedro González

== Awards and honors ==
- Phil Niekro, Roberto Clemente Award

=== League leaders ===
- Phil Niekro, National League leader, Losses
