= 1981 Atlanta Braves season =

1981 Atlanta Braves
- League: National League
- Division: West
- Ballpark: Atlanta–Fulton County Stadium
- City: Atlanta
- Record: 50–56 (.472)
- Divisional place: 5th
- Owners: Ted Turner
- General managers: John Mullen
- Managers: Bobby Cox
- Television: WTBS/Superstation WTBS
- Radio: WSB (Ernie Johnson, Pete Van Wieren, Skip Caray, Darrel Chaney)

The 1981 Atlanta Braves season was the 16th in Atlanta and the 111th overall.

== Offseason ==
- November 15, 1980: Claudell Washington was signed as a free agent by the Braves.
- December 12, 1980: Doyle Alexander was traded by the Braves to the San Francisco Giants for John Montefusco and Craig Landis (minors).
- January 12, 1981: Gaylord Perry was signed as a free agent by the Braves.
- March 25, 1981: Gary Matthews was traded by the Braves to the Philadelphia Phillies for Bob Walk.

== Regular season ==
=== Season standings ===
NL West
Team	W	L	Pct.	GB	Home	Road
Cincinnati Reds	66	42	.611	—	32‍–‍22	34‍–‍20
Los Angeles Dodgers	63	47	.573	4	33‍–‍23	30‍–‍24
Houston Astros	61	49	.555	6	31‍–‍20	30‍–‍29
San Francisco Giants	56	55	.505	11½	29‍–‍24	27‍–‍31
Atlanta Braves	50	56	.472	15	22‍–‍27	28‍–‍29
San Diego Padres	41	69	.373	26	20‍–‍35	21‍–‍34

NL West First Half Standings	W	L	Pct.	GB
Los Angeles Dodgers	36	21	.632	—
Cincinnati Reds	35	21	.625	1/2
Houston Astros	28	29	.491	8
Atlanta Braves	25	29	.463	9 1/2
San Francisco Giants	27	32	.458	10
San Diego Padres	23	33	.411	12 1/2

NL West Second Half Standings	W	L	Pct.	GB
Houston Astros	33	20	.623	—
Cincinnati Reds	31	21	.596	1 1/2
San Francisco Giants	29	23	.558	3 1/2
Los Angeles Dodgers	27	26	.509	6
Atlanta Braves	25	27	.481	7 1/2
San Diego Padres	18	36	.333	15 1/2

=== Record vs. opponents ===
1981 National League record Sources:
Team	ATL	CHC	CIN	HOU	LAD	MON	NYM	PHI	PIT	SD	SF	STL
Atlanta	—	3–2–1	6–5	4–8	7–7	3–7	3–3	4–5	2–3	9–6	5–7	4–3
Chicago	2–3–1	—	1–5	1–6	6–4	4–7	5–8–1	2–10	4–10	3–3	5–5	5–4–1
Cincinnati	5–6	5–1	—	8–4	8–8	5–4	7–3	5–2	4–2	10–2	9–5	0–5
Houston	8–4	6–1	4–8	—	4–8	5–2	6–3	4–6	2–4	11–3	9–6	2–4
Los Angeles	7–7	4–6	8–8	8–4	—	5–2	5–1	3–3	5–1	6–5	7–5	5–5
Montreal	7–3	7–4	4–5	2–5	2–5	—	9–3	7–4	10–3	4–2	2–5	6–9
New York	3–3	8–5–1	3–7	3–6	1–5	3–9	—	7–7	3–6–1	2–5	2–4	6–5
Philadelphia	5-4	10–2	2–5	6–4	3–3	4–7	7–7	—	7–5	4–2	4–3	7–6
Pittsburgh	3–2	10–4	2–4	4–2	1–5	3–10	6–3–1	5–7	—	6–4	3–7	3–8
San Diego	6–9	3–3	2–10	3–11	5–6	2–4	5–2	2–4	4–6	—	6–7	3–7
San Francisco	7–5	5–5	5–9	6–9	5–7	5–2	4–2	3–4	7–3	7–6	—	2–3
St. Louis	3–4	4–5–1	5–0	4–2	5–5	9–6	5–6	6–7	8–3	7–3	3–2	—

=== Roster ===
1981 Atlanta Braves
Roster
Pitchers: 50 Jose Alvarez; 32 Steve Bedrosian; 40 Tommy Boggs; 34 Larry Bradford; 37 Rick Camp; 26 Gene Garber; 49 Preston Hanna; 39 Al Hrabosky; 42 Rick Mahler; 29 Rick Matula; 27 Larry McWilliams; 24 John Montefusco; 35 Phil Niekro; 36 Gaylord Perry; 43 Bob Walk	Catchers: 20 Bruce Benedict; 15 Bill Nahorodny; 12 Larry Owen; 14 Matt Sinatro; Infielders: 10 Chris Chambliss; 9 Luis Gómez; 5 Bob Horner; 17 Glenn Hubbard; 47 Brook Jacoby; 4 Biff Pocoroba; 16 Rafael Ramírez; 1 Jerry Royster; 15 Paul Runge; 11 Ken Smith	Outfielders: 30 Brian Asselstine; 22 Brett Butler; 31 Albert Hall; 19 Terry Harper; 25 Rufino Linares; 28 Mike Lum; 45 Eddie Miller; 3 Dale Murphy; 18 Claudell Washington; 28 Larry Whisenton; Other batters: 22 Bob Porter	Manager: 6 Bobby Cox; Coaches: 23 Tommie Aaron; 48 Cloyd Boyer; 2 Bobby Dews; 8 John Sullivan

== Player stats ==
=== Batting ===
==== Starters by position ====
Note: Pos = Position; G = Games played; AB = At bats; H = Hits; Avg. = Batting average; HR = Home runs; RBI = Runs batted in

Pos	Player	G	AB	H	Avg.	HR	RBI
C	Bruce Benedict	90	295	78	.264	5	35
1B	Chris Chambliss	107	404	110	.272	8	51
2B	Glenn Hubbard	99	361	85	.235	6	33
SS	Rafael Ramírez	95	307	67	.218	2	20
3B	Bob Horner	79	300	83	.277	15	42
LF	Rufino Linares	78	253	67	.265	5	25
CF	Dale Murphy	104	369	91	.247	13	50
RF	Claudell Washington	85	320	93	.291	5	37

==== Other batters ====
Note: G = Games played; AB = At bats; H = Hits; Avg. = Batting average; HR = Home runs; RBI = Runs batted in

Player	G	AB	H	Avg.	HR	RBI
Eddie Miller	50	134	31	.231	0	7
Brett Butler	40	126	32	.254	0	4
Biff Pocoroba	57	122	22	.180	0	8
Jerry Royster	64	93	19	.204	0	9
Brian Asselstine	56	86	22	.256	2	10
Terry Harper	40	73	19	.260	2	8
Luis Gómez	35	35	7	.200	0	1
Matt Sinatro	12	32	9	.281	0	4
Paul Runge	10	27	7	.259	0	2
Larry Owen	13	16	0	.000	0	0
Bob Porter	17	14	4	.286	0	4
Bill Nahorodny	14	13	3	.231	0	2
Mike Lum	10	11	1	.091	0	0
Brook Jacoby	11	10	2	.200	0	1
Larry Whisenton	9	5	1	.200	0	0
Ken Smith	5	3	1	.333	0	0
Albert Hall	6	2	0	.000	0	0

=== Pitching ===
==== Starting pitchers ====
Note: G = Games pitched; IP = Innings pitched; W = Wins; L = Losses; ERA = Earned run average; SO = Strikeouts

Player	G	IP	W	L	ERA	SO
Gaylord Perry	23	150.2	8	9	3.94	60
Tommy Boggs	25	142.2	3	13	4.10	81
Phil Niekro	22	139.1	7	7	3.10	62
Larry McWilliams	6	37.2	2	1	3.11	23

==== Other pitchers ====
Note: G = Games pitched; IP = Innings pitched; W = Wins; L = Losses; ERA = Earned run average; SO = Strikeouts

Player	G	IP	W	L	ERA	SO
Rick Mahler	34	112.1	8	6	2.80	54
John Montefusco	26	77.1	2	3	3.49	34
Bob Walk	12	43.1	1	4	4.57	16

==== Relief pitchers ====
Note: G = Games pitched; W = Wins; L = Losses; SV = Saves; ERA = Earned run average; SO = Strikeouts

Player	G	W	L	SV	ERA	SO
Rick Camp	48	9	3	17	1.78	47
Gene Garber	35	4	6	2	2.61	34
Larry Bradford	25	2	0	1	3.71	14
Al Hrabosky	24	1	1	1	1.07	13
Preston Hanna	20	2	1	0	6.37	22
Steve Bedrosian	15	1	2	0	4.44	9
Rick Matula	5	0	0	0	6.43	0
Jose Alvarez	1	0	0	0	0.00	2
Luis Gómez	1	0	0	0	27.00	0

== Farm system ==
Level	Team	League	Manager
AAA	Richmond Braves	International League	Eddie Haas
AA	Savannah Braves	Southern League	Andy Gilbert
A	Durham Bulls	Carolina League	Al Gallagher
A	Anderson Braves	South Atlantic League	Sonny Jackson
Rookie	GCL Braves	Gulf Coast League	Pedro González
