= 1980 San Francisco Giants season =

1980 San Francisco Giants
- League: National League
- Division: West
- Ballpark: Candlestick Park
- City: San Francisco, California
- Owners: Bob Lurie
- General managers: Spec Richardson
- Managers: Dave Bristol
- Television: KTVU (Lindsey Nelson, Gary Park)
- Radio: KNBR (Lindsey Nelson, Hank Greenwald)

The 1980 San Francisco Giants season was the Giants' 98th season in Major League Baseball, their 23rd season in San Francisco since their move from New York following the 1957 season, and their 21st at Candlestick Park. The team finished in fifth place in the National League West with a 75–86 record, 17 games behind the Houston Astros.

== Offseason ==
- December 3, 1979: Guy Sularz was drafted by the Minnesota Twins from the San Francisco Giants in the 1979 rule 5 draft.
- December 19, 1979: Rob Andrews was released by the Giants.
- March 13, 1980: Rudy Meoli was signed as a free agent by the Giants.
- March 15, 1980: Joe Pettini was sent by the Montreal Expos to the San Francisco Giants to complete an earlier deal made on June 13, 1979.

== Regular season ==
=== Season standings ===
NL West
Team	W	L	Pct.	GB	Home	Road
Houston Astros	93	70	.571	—	55‍–‍26	38‍–‍44
Los Angeles Dodgers	92	71	.564	1	55‍–‍27	37‍–‍44
Cincinnati Reds	89	73	.549	3½	44‍–‍37	45‍–‍36
Atlanta Braves	81	80	.503	11	50‍–‍30	31‍–‍50
San Francisco Giants	75	86	.466	17	44‍–‍37	31‍–‍49
San Diego Padres	73	89	.451	19½	45‍–‍36	28‍–‍53

=== Record vs. opponents ===
1980 National League record Sources:
Team	ATL	CHC	CIN	HOU	LAD	MON	NYM	PHI	PIT	SD	SF	STL
Atlanta	—	8–4	2–16	7–11	11–7	5–7	3–9	5–7	11–1	12–6	11–6	6–6
Chicago	4–8	—	7–5	1–11	5–7	6–12	10–8	5–13	8–10	4–8	5–7	9–9
Cincinnati	16–2	5–7	—	8–10	9–9	3–9	8–4	7–5	6–6	15–3–1	7–11	5–7
Houston	11–7	11–1	10–8	—	9–10	5–7	8–4	3–9	7–5	11–7	11–7	7–5
Los Angeles	7–11	7–5	9–9	10–9	—	11–1	7–5	6–6	6–6	9–9	13–5	7–5
Montreal	7–5	12–6	9–3	7–5	1–11	—	10–8	9–9	6–12	10–2	7–5	12–6
New York	9–3	8–10	4–8	4–8	5–7	8–10	—	6–12	10–8	1–11	3–9	9–9
Philadelphia	7-5	13–5	5–7	9–3	6–6	9–9	12–6	—	7–11	8–4	6–6	9–9
Pittsburgh	1–11	10–8	6–6	5–7	6–6	12–6	8–10	11–7	—	6–6	8–4	10–8
San Diego	6–12	8–4	3–15–1	7–11	9–9	2–10	11–1	4–8	6–6	—	10–8	7–5
San Francisco	6–11	7–5	11–7	7–11	5–13	5–7	9–3	6–6	4–8	8–10	—	7–5
St. Louis	6–6	9–9	7–5	5–7	5–7	6–12	9–9	9–9	8–10	5–7	5–7	—

=== Notable transactions ===
- April 1, 1980: Guy Sularz was returned (earlier draft pick) by the Minnesota Twins to the San Francisco Giants.
- April 2, 1980: Jeff Little was released by the Giants.
- April 3, 1980: Pedro Borbón was released by the Giants.
- April 3, 1980: Rudy Meoli was released by the Giants.
- June 3, 1980: Jessie Reid was drafted by the San Francisco Giants in the 1st round (7th pick) of the 1980 amateur draft.
- June 3, 1980: Randy Gomez was drafted by the Giants in the 25th round of the 1980 Major League Baseball draft.
- June 16, 1980: Casey Parsons was purchased from the Giants by the Seattle Mariners.

=== Major League debuts ===
- Batters:
  - Chris Bourjos (Aug 31)
  - Rich Murray (Jun 7)
  - Joe Pettini (Jul 10)
  - Guy Sularz (Sep 2)
- Pitchers:
  - Bill Bordley (Jun 30)
  - Fred Breining (Sep 4)
  - Al Hargesheimer (Jul 14)
  - Mike Rowland (Jul 25)
  - Jeff Stember (Aug 5)

=== Roster ===
1980 San Francisco Giants roster
Roster
Pitchers: 14 Vida Blue; 34 Bill Bordley; 48 Fred Breining; 43 Tom Griffin; 28 Ed Halicki; 40 Alan Hargesheimer; 19 Al Holland; 39 Bob Knepper; 46 Gary Lavelle; 38 Greg Minton; 17 Randy Moffitt; 26 John Montefusco; 23 Philip Nastu; 33 Allen Ripley; 28,53 Mike Rowland; 50 Jeff Stember; 32 Ed Whitson	Catchers: 2 Marc Hill; 35 Dennis Littlejohn; 7 Milt May; 3 Mike Sadek; Infielders: 41 Darrell Evans; 15 Mike Ivie; 10 Johnnie LeMaster; 44 Willie McCovey; 16 Roger Metzger; 29 Rich Murray; 2 Joe Pettini; 6 Rennie Stennett; 20 Joe Strain; 21 Guy Sularz	Outfielders: 18 Chris Bourjos; 22 Jack Clark; 31 Larry Herndon; 36 Billy North; 49 Max Venable; 45 Terry Whitfield; 9 Jim Wohlford	Manager: 1 Dave Bristol; Coaches: 8 Vern Benson; 12 Jim Davenport; 5 Jim Lefebvre; 47 Don McMahon

== Player stats ==
= Indicates team leader

=== Batting ===
==== Starters by position ====
Note: Pos = Position; G = Games played; AB = At bats; H = Hits; Avg. = Batting average; HR = Home runs; RBI = Runs batted in

Pos	Player	G	AB	H	Avg.	HR	RBI
C	Milt May	111	358	93	.260	6	50
1B	Mike Ivie	79	286	69	.241	4	25
2B	Rennie Stennett	120	397	97	.244	2	37
SS	Johnny LeMaster	135	405	87	.215	3	31
3B	Darrell Evans	154	556	147	.264	20	78
LF	Terry Whitfield	118	321	95	.296	4	26
CF	Bill North	128	415	104	.251	1	19
RF	Jack Clark	127	437	124	.284	22	82

==== Other batters ====
Note: G = Games played; AB = At bats; H = Hits; Avg. = Batting average; HR = Home runs; RBI = Runs batted in

Player	G	AB	H	Avg.	HR	RBI
Larry Herndon	139	493	127	.258	8	49
Rich Murray	53	194	42	.216	4	24
Jim Wohlford	91	193	54	.280	1	24
Joe Pettini	63	190	44	.232	1	9
Joe Strain	77	189	54	.286	0	16
Mike Sadek	64	151	38	.252	1	16
Max Venable	64	138	37	.268	0	10
Willie McCovey	48	113	23	.204	1	16
Guy Sularz	25	65	16	.246	0	3
Marc Hill	17	41	7	.171	0	0
Dennis Littlejohn	13	29	7	.241	0	2
Roger Metzger	28	27	2	.074	0	0
Chris Bourjos	13	22	5	.227	1	2

=== Pitching ===
==== Starting pitchers ====
Note: G = Games pitched; IP = Innings pitched; W = Wins; L = Losses; ERA = Earned run average; SO = Strikeouts

Player	G	IP	W	L	ERA	SO
Vida Blue	31	224.0	14	10	2.97	129
Bob Knepper	35	215.1	9	16	4.10	103
Ed Whitson	34	211.2	11	13	3.10	90
John Montefusco	22	113.1	4	8	4.37	85
Allen Ripley	23	112.2	9	10	4.15	65
Alan Hargesheimer	15	75.0	4	6	4.32	40
Jeff Stember	1	3.0	0	0	3.00	0

==== Other pitchers ====
Note: G = Games pitched; IP = Innings pitched; W = Wins; L = Losses; ERA = Earned run average; SO = Strikeouts

Player	G	IP	W	L	ERA	SO
Bill Bordley	8	30.2	2	3	4.70	11
Ed Halicki	11	25.0	0	0	5.40	14

==== Relief pitchers ====
Note: G = Games pitched; W = Wins; L = Losses; SV = Saves; ERA = Earned run average; SO = Strikeouts

Player	G	W	L	SV	ERA	SO
Greg Minton	68	4	6	19	2.46	42
Gary Lavelle	62	6	8	9	3.42	66
Al Holland	54	5	3	7	1.75	65
Tom Griffin	43	5	1	0	2.76	79
Mike Rowland	19	1	1	0	2.33	8
Randy Moffitt	13	1	1	0	4.86	10
Phil Nastu	6	0	0	0	6.00	1
Fred Breining	5	0	0	0	5.40	3

== Awards and honors ==
- Jack Clark RF, Willie Mac Award

All-Star Game

- Vida Blue, Pitcher, Reserve
- Ed Whitson, Pitcher, Reserve

== Farm system ==
Level	Team	League	Manager
AAA	Phoenix Giants	Pacific Coast League	Rocky Bridges
AA	Shreveport Captains	Texas League	Andy Gilbert
A	Fresno Giants	California League	Jack Mull
A	Clinton Giants	Midwest League	Wayne Cato
Rookie	Great Falls Giants	Pioneer League	Ernie Rodriguez
