= 1980 San Diego Padres season =

1980 San Diego Padres
- League: National League
- Division: West
- Ballpark: San Diego Stadium
- City: San Diego, California
- Record: 73–89 (.451)
- Divisional place: 6th
- Owners: Ray Kroc
- General managers: Bob Fontaine, Jack McKeon
- Managers: Jerry Coleman
- Television: KFMB-TV
- Radio: KFMB (AM) (Ed Doucette, Dave Campbell, Bob Chandler, Ted Leitner)

The 1980 San Diego Padres season was the 12th season in franchise history.

== Offseason ==
- October 3, 1979: Mickey Lolich was released by the Padres.
- December 3, 1979: Von Joshua was selected off waivers by the Padres from the Los Angeles Dodgers.
- February 15, 1980: Gaylord Perry, Tucker Ashford and Joe Carroll (minors) were traded by the Padres to the Texas Rangers for Willie Montañez.
- February 15, 1980: Bob Owchinko was traded by the San Diego Padres with Jim Wilhelm to the Cleveland Indians for Jerry Mumphrey.

== Regular season ==
- Ozzie Smith set a major league record for most assists by a shortstop in 1980 with 621.

=== Season standings ===
NL West
| Team | W | L | Pct. | GB | Home | Road |
|---|---|---|---|---|---|---|
| Houston Astros | 93 | 70 | .571 | — | 55‍–‍26 | 38‍–‍44 |
| Los Angeles Dodgers | 92 | 71 | .564 | 1 | 55‍–‍27 | 37‍–‍44 |
| Cincinnati Reds | 89 | 73 | .549 | 3½ | 44‍–‍37 | 45‍–‍36 |
| Atlanta Braves | 81 | 80 | .503 | 11 | 50‍–‍30 | 31‍–‍50 |
| San Francisco Giants | 75 | 86 | .466 | 17 | 44‍–‍37 | 31‍–‍49 |
| San Diego Padres | 73 | 89 | .451 | 19½ | 45‍–‍36 | 28‍–‍53 |

=== Record vs. opponents ===
1980 National League record Sources:
| Team | ATL | CHC | CIN | HOU | LAD | MON | NYM | PHI | PIT | SD | SF | STL |
|---|---|---|---|---|---|---|---|---|---|---|---|---|
| Atlanta | — | 8–4 | 2–16 | 7–11 | 11–7 | 5–7 | 3–9 | 5–7 | 11–1 | 12–6 | 11–6 | 6–6 |
| Chicago | 4–8 | — | 7–5 | 1–11 | 5–7 | 6–12 | 10–8 | 5–13 | 8–10 | 4–8 | 5–7 | 9–9 |
| Cincinnati | 16–2 | 5–7 | — | 8–10 | 9–9 | 3–9 | 8–4 | 7–5 | 6–6 | 15–3–1 | 7–11 | 5–7 |
| Houston | 11–7 | 11–1 | 10–8 | — | 9–10 | 5–7 | 8–4 | 3–9 | 7–5 | 11–7 | 11–7 | 7–5 |
| Los Angeles | 7–11 | 7–5 | 9–9 | 10–9 | — | 11–1 | 7–5 | 6–6 | 6–6 | 9–9 | 13–5 | 7–5 |
| Montreal | 7–5 | 12–6 | 9–3 | 7–5 | 1–11 | — | 10–8 | 9–9 | 6–12 | 10–2 | 7–5 | 12–6 |
| New York | 9–3 | 8–10 | 4–8 | 4–8 | 5–7 | 8–10 | — | 6–12 | 10–8 | 1–11 | 3–9 | 9–9 |
| Philadelphia | 7–5 | 13–5 | 5–7 | 9–3 | 6–6 | 9–9 | 12–6 | — | 7–11 | 8–4 | 6–6 | 9–9 |
| Pittsburgh | 1–11 | 10–8 | 6–6 | 5–7 | 6–6 | 12–6 | 8–10 | 11–7 | — | 6–6 | 8–4 | 10–8 |
| San Diego | 6–12 | 8–4 | 3–15–1 | 7–11 | 9–9 | 2–10 | 11–1 | 4–8 | 6–6 | — | 10–8 | 7–5 |
| San Francisco | 6–11 | 7–5 | 11–7 | 7–11 | 5–13 | 5–7 | 9–3 | 6–6 | 4–8 | 8–10 | — | 7–5 |
| St. Louis | 6–6 | 9–9 | 7–5 | 5–7 | 5–7 | 6–12 | 9–9 | 9–9 | 8–10 | 5–7 | 5–7 | — |

=== Opening Day starters ===
- Dave Cash
- Bill Fahey
- Randy Jones
- Jerry Mumphrey
- Gene Richards
- Aurelio Rodríguez
- Ozzie Smith
- Gene Tenace
- Dave Winfield

=== Notable transactions ===
- April 2, 1980: Danny Boone was signed as a free agent by the Padres.
- June 3, 1980: Ron Romanick was drafted by the San Diego Padres in the 1st round (7th pick) of the 1980 amateur draft (secondary phase), but did not sign.
- June 3, 1980: Gerry Davis was drafted by the Padres in the 6th round of the 1980 Major League Baseball draft.
- August 9, 1980: Kurt Bevacqua and a player to be named later were traded by the Padres to the Pittsburgh Pirates for Luis Salazar and Rick Lancellotti. The Padres completed the deal by sending Mark Lee to the Pirates on August 9.
- August 7, 1980: Von Joshua was released by the Padres.
- August 25, 1980: Willie Montañez was traded by the Padres to the Montreal Expos for Tony Phillips and cash.

=== Roster ===
1980 San Diego Padres
Roster
| Pitchers: 36 Mike Armstrong; 47 Dennis Blair; 51 John Curtis; 16 John D'Acquisto; 33 Juan Eichelberger; 34 Rollie Fingers; 35 Randy Jones; 48 Dennis Kinney; 43 Gary Lucas; 27 Steve Mura; 41 Eric Rasmussen; 32 Bob Shirley; 42 George Stablein; 49 Tom Tellmann; 40 Rick Wise | Catchers: 3 Bill Fahey; 5 Fred Kendall; 7 Craig Stimac; 18 Gene Tenace; Infielders: 11 Chuck Baker; 5 Randy Bass; 7 Kurt Bevacqua; 30 Dave Cash; 21 Paul Dade; 8 Barry Evans; 6 Tim Flannery; 25 Willie Montañez; 15 Broderick Perkins; 4 Aurelio Rodríguez; 4 Luis Salazar; 1 Ozzie Smith | Outfielders: 22 Von Joshua; 28 Jerry Mumphrey; 17 Gene Richards; 20 Jerry Turner; 31 Dave Winfield | Manager: 2 Jerry Coleman; Coaches: 23 Chuck Estrada (Pitching); 19 Al Heist (Third Base); 37 Dick Phillips (Hitting & First Base); 29 Don Williams (Bench) |

== Player stats ==
=== Batting ===
==== Starters by position ====
Note: Pos = Position; G = Games played; AB = At bats; H = Hits; Avg. = Batting average; HR = Home runs; RBI = Runs batted in

| Pos | Player | G | AB | H | Avg. | HR | RBI |
|---|---|---|---|---|---|---|---|
| C | Gene Tenace | 133 | 316 | 70 | .222 | 17 | 50 |
| 1B | Willie Montañez | 128 | 481 | 132 | .274 | 6 | 63 |
| 2B | Dave Cash | 130 | 397 | 90 | .227 | 1 | 23 |
| 3B | Aurelio Rodríguez | 89 | 175 | 35 | .200 | 2 | 13 |
| SS | Ozzie Smith | 158 | 609 | 140 | .230 | 0 | 35 |
| LF | Gene Richards | 158 | 642 | 193 | .301 | 4 | 41 |
| CF | Jerry Mumphrey | 160 | 564 | 168 | .298 | 4 | 59 |
| RF | Dave Winfield | 162 | 558 | 154 | .276 | 20 | 87 |

==== Other batters ====
Note: G = Games played; AB = At bats; H = Hits; Avg. = Batting average; HR = Home runs; RBI = Runs batted in

| Player | G | AB | H | Avg. | HR | RBI |
|---|---|---|---|---|---|---|
| Tim Flannery | 95 | 292 | 70 | .240 | 0 | 25 |
| Bill Fahey | 93 | 241 | 62 | .257 | 1 | 22 |
| Luis Salazar | 44 | 169 | 57 | .337 | 1 | 25 |
| Jerry Turner | 85 | 153 | 44 | .288 | 3 | 18 |
| Barry Evans | 73 | 125 | 29 | .232 | 1 | 14 |
| Broderick Perkins | 43 | 100 | 37 | .370 | 2 | 14 |
| Kurt Bevacqua | 62 | 71 | 19 | .268 | 0 | 12 |
| Von Joshua | 53 | 63 | 15 | .238 | 2 | 7 |
| Paul Dade | 68 | 53 | 10 | .189 | 0 | 3 |
| Craig Stimac | 20 | 50 | 11 | .220 | 0 | 7 |
| Randy Bass | 19 | 49 | 14 | .286 | 3 | 8 |
| Fred Kendall | 19 | 24 | 7 | .292 | 0 | 2 |
| Chuck Baker | 9 | 22 | 3 | .136 | 0 | 0 |

=== Pitching ===
==== Starting pitchers ====
Note: G = Games pitched; IP = Innings pitched; W = Wins; L = Losses; ERA = Earned run average; SO = Strikeouts

| Player | G | IP | W | L | ERA | SO |
|---|---|---|---|---|---|---|
| John Curtis | 30 | 187.0 | 10 | 8 | 3.51 | 71 |
| Randy Jones | 24 | 154.1 | 5 | 13 | 3.91 | 53 |
| Rick Wise | 27 | 154.1 | 6 | 8 | 3.67 | 59 |
| Juan Eichelberger | 15 | 88.2 | 4 | 2 | 3.65 | 43 |

==== Other pitchers ====
Note: G = Games pitched; IP = Innings pitched; W = Wins; L = Losses; ERA = Earned run average; SO = Strikeouts

| Player | G | IP | W | L | ERA | SO |
|---|---|---|---|---|---|---|
| Steve Mura | 37 | 168.2 | 8 | 7 | 3.68 | 109 |
| Gary Lucas | 46 | 150.0 | 5 | 8 | 3.24 | 85 |
| Bob Shirley | 59 | 137.0 | 11 | 12 | 3.55 | 67 |
| Eric Rasmussen | 40 | 111.1 | 4 | 11 | 4.37 | 50 |
| Tom Tellmann | 6 | 22.1 | 3 | 0 | 1.61 | 9 |
| Dennis Blair | 5 | 14.0 | 0 | 1 | 6.43 | 11 |
| George Stablein | 4 | 11.2 | 0 | 1 | 3.09 | 4 |

==== Relief pitchers ====
Note: G = Games pitched; W = Wins; L = Losses; SV = Saves; ERA = Earned run average; SO = Strikeouts

| Player | G | W | L | SV | ERA | SO |
|---|---|---|---|---|---|---|
| Rollie Fingers | 66 | 11 | 9 | 23 | 2.80 | 69 |
| Dennis Kinney | 50 | 4 | 6 | 1 | 4.25 | 40 |
| John D'Acquisto | 39 | 2 | 3 | 1 | 3.76 | 44 |
| Mike Armstrong | 11 | 0 | 0 | 0 | 5.65 | 14 |

== Awards and honors ==
- Ozzie Smith, SS, Gold Glove Award

1980 Major League Baseball All-Star Game

== Farm system ==
| Level | Team | League | Manager |
|---|---|---|---|
| AAA | Hawaii Islanders | Pacific Coast League | Doug Rader |
| AA | Amarillo Gold Sox | Texas League | Eddie Watt |
| A | Reno Silver Sox | California League | Jack Maloof |
| A-Short Season | Walla Walla Padres | Northwest League | Curt Daniels |
