= 1980 New York Mets season =

1980 New York Mets
- League: National League
- Division: East
- Ballpark: Shea Stadium
- City: New York
- Record: 67–95 (.414)
- Divisional place: 5th
- Owners: Nelson Doubleday, Jr.
- General manager: Frank Cashen
- Manager: Joe Torre
- Television: WOR-TV
- Radio: WMCA (Ralph Kiner, Bob Murphy, Steve Albert)

The 1980 New York Mets season was the 19th regular season for the Mets, who played home games at Shea Stadium. Led by manager Joe Torre, the team had a 67–95 record and finished in fifth place in the National League East, twenty-four games behind the first place Philadelphia Phillies.

== Offseason ==
=== The beginnings of the 1986 team ===
On January 24, 1980, ownership of the team changed hands. The group that bought the Mets for an estimated $22 million (the largest amount paid for a ball club to that point) was headed by Nelson Doubleday Jr. and Fred Wilpon. Doubleday was head of the old and distinguished publishing company that bore his name, while Wilpon was a highly successful real-estate developer. The new owners promised to invest money to acquire winning players and develop a competitive club, though it took a few years before the new partners were able to rebuild a solid contender.

In February, the new owners hired Frank Cashen, who had spent ten years in the front office of the Baltimore Orioles from 1966 to 1976, during which time the Orioles went to four World Series, winning two. During his tenure, the Mets would see what some called a "resuscitation", eventually leading to the team's first World Championship in 17 years. After leaving the Orioles, Cashen worked outside of baseball for three years before joining commissioner Bowie Kuhn's office as administrator of baseball. It was from this job that the Mets wooed him and installed him as executive vice president and general manager.

== Regular season ==
=== On the field ===
Due to their last-place finish in 1979, the Mets had the first pick in the 1980 Major League Baseball draft. They used it to select an 18-year-old outfielder from Los Angeles, Darryl Strawberry, a key figure of future Mets teams. With the twenty-third pick, they selected Billy Beane, later the protagonist in Moneyball.

Under Torre, the team suffered their 4th consecutive losing season, 24 games out of first place, although the Mets moved up one place in the standings to fifth. They even flirted with .500 (until losing 38 of their last 49 games), which may have led to attendance jumping nearly 400,000 to almost 1,200,000. The team had the motto "The Magic is Back" during the 1980 season. Notable highlights from the season included three come-from-behind wins in five days: 5–4 and 6–5 over the Dodgers June 10 and 12 (after trailing 4–0 and 5–0), and 7–6 over the Giants on the 14th after trailing 6–0. The Mets fell to earth in a five-game sweep at Shea by the eventual champion Phillies in mid-August, before which they were 56–57. Their final home series against the Pirates drew just over 5,900 fans for three games combined.

The construction of the then-state-of-the-art DiamondVision electronic scoreboard in center field for 1981 resulted in a sharp increase in ticket prices following this season, e.g., with General Admission seating rising from $1.50 to $4.00.

=== Season standings ===
NL East
Team	W	L	Pct.	GB	Home	Road
Philadelphia Phillies	91	71	.562	—	49‍–‍32	42‍–‍39
Montreal Expos	90	72	.556	1	51‍–‍29	39‍–‍43
Pittsburgh Pirates	83	79	.512	8	47‍–‍34	36‍–‍45
St. Louis Cardinals	74	88	.457	17	41‍–‍40	33‍–‍48
New York Mets	67	95	.414	24	38‍–‍44	29‍–‍51
Chicago Cubs	64	98	.395	27	37‍–‍44	27‍–‍54

=== Record vs. opponents ===
1980 National League record Sources:
Team	ATL	CHC	CIN	HOU	LAD	MON	NYM	PHI	PIT	SD	SF	STL
Atlanta	—	8–4	2–16	7–11	11–7	5–7	3–9	5–7	11–1	12–6	11–6	6–6
Chicago	4–8	—	7–5	1–11	5–7	6–12	10–8	5–13	8–10	4–8	5–7	9–9
Cincinnati	16–2	5–7	—	8–10	9–9	3–9	8–4	7–5	6–6	15–3–1	7–11	5–7
Houston	11–7	11–1	10–8	—	9–10	5–7	8–4	3–9	7–5	11–7	11–7	7–5
Los Angeles	7–11	7–5	9–9	10–9	—	11–1	7–5	6–6	6–6	9–9	13–5	7–5
Montreal	7–5	12–6	9–3	7–5	1–11	—	10–8	9–9	6–12	10–2	7–5	12–6
New York	9–3	8–10	4–8	4–8	5–7	8–10	—	6–12	10–8	1–11	3–9	9–9
Philadelphia	7-5	13–5	5–7	9–3	6–6	9–9	12–6	—	7–11	8–4	6–6	9–9
Pittsburgh	1–11	10–8	6–6	5–7	6–6	12–6	8–10	11–7	—	6–6	8–4	10–8
San Diego	6–12	8–4	3–15–1	7–11	9–9	2–10	11–1	4–8	6–6	—	10–8	7–5
San Francisco	6–11	7–5	11–7	7–11	5–13	5–7	9–3	6–6	4–8	8–10	—	7–5
St. Louis	6–6	9–9	7–5	5–7	5–7	6–12	9–9	9–9	8–10	5–7	5–7	—

=== Opening Day starters ===
- Doug Flynn
- Steve Henderson
- Mike Jorgensen
- Elliott Maddox
- Lee Mazzilli
- Jerry Morales
- John Stearns
- Craig Swan
- Frank Taveras

=== Notable transactions ===
- June 3, 1980: 1980 Major League Baseball draft
  - Darryl Strawberry was drafted by the Mets in the 1st round (1st pick). Player signed July 11, 1980.
  - Billy Beane was drafted by the Mets in the 1st round (23rd pick).
  - Ronn Reynolds was drafted by the Mets in the 5th round. Player signed June 7, 1980.
  - Rick Ownbey was drafted by the Mets in the 13th round.
  - Al Newman was drafted by the Mets in the 2nd round of the Secondary Phase, but did not sign.
- June 17, 1980: Kevin Kobel was traded by the Mets to the Kansas City Royals for Randy McGilberry.
- July 1, 1980: Randy Johnson was traded by the Mets to the Atlanta Braves for Bill Haselrig (minors).

=== Roster ===
1980 New York Mets
Roster
Pitchers: 46 Neil Allen; 43 Juan Berenguer; 36 Mark Bomback; 26 Ray Burris; 33 Pete Falcone; 48 Ed Glynn; 32 Tom Hausman; 17 Scott Holman; 31 Roy Lee Jackson; 49 Kevin Kobel; 59 Ed Lynch; 49 Dyar Miller; 20 John Pacella; 45 Jeff Reardon; 30 Mike Scott; 27 Craig Swan; 40 Pat Zachry	Catchers: 15 Butch Benton; 42 Ron Hodges; 12 John Stearns; 6 Alex Treviño; Infielders: 25 Bill Almon; 28 Wally Backman; 39 Hubie Brooks; 23 Doug Flynn; 2 Mike Jorgensen; 21 Elliott Maddox; 2,19 Phil Mankowski; 16 Lee Mazzilli; 4 José Moreno; 3,61 Mario Ramírez; 58 Luis Rosado; 11 Frank Taveras	Outfielders: 6 José Cardenal; 5 Steve Henderson; 17 Jerry Morales; 8 Dan Norman; 15 Claudell Washington; 1 Mookie Wilson; 18 Joel Youngblood	Manager: 9 Joe Torre; Coaches: 53 Chuck Cottier; 52 Joe Pignatano; 51 Dick Sisler; 54 Rube Walker

== Player stats ==
=== Batting ===
==== Starters by position ====
Note: Pos = Position; G = Games played; AB = At bats; H = Hits; Avg. = Batting average; HR = Home runs; RBI = Runs batted in

Pos	Player	G	AB	H	Avg.	HR	RBI
C	Alex Treviño	106	355	91	.256	0	37
1B	Lee Mazzilli	152	578	162	.280	16	76
2B	Doug Flynn	128	443	113	.255	0	24
SS	Frank Taveras	141	562	157	.279	0	25
3B	Elliott Maddox	130	411	101	.246	4	34
LF	Steve Henderson	143	513	149	.290	8	58
CF	Jerry Morales	94	193	49	.254	3	30
RF	Joel Youngblood	146	514	142	.276	8	69

==== Other batters ====
Note: G = Games played; AB = At bats; H = Hits; Avg. = Batting average; HR = Home runs; RBI = Runs batted in

Player	G	AB	H	Avg.	HR	RBI
Mike Jorgensen	119	321	82	.255	7	43
John Stearns	91	319	91	.285	0	45
Claudell Washington	79	284	78	.275	10	42
Bill Almon	48	112	19	.170	0	4
Mookie Wilson	27	105	26	.248	0	4
Wally Backman	27	93	30	.323	0	9
Dan Norman	69	92	17	.185	2	9
Hubie Brooks	24	81	25	.309	1	10
José Moreno	37	46	9	.196	2	9
Ron Hodges	36	42	10	.238	0	5
José Cardenal	26	42	7	.167	0	4
Mario Ramírez	18	24	5	.208	0	0
Butch Benton	12	21	1	.048	0	0
Phil Mankowski	8	12	2	.167	0	1
Luis Rosado	4	4	0	.000	0	0

=== Pitching ===
==== Starting pitchers ====
Note: G = Games pitched; IP = Innings pitched; W = Wins; L = Losses; ERA = Earned run average; SO = Strikeouts

Player	G	IP	W	L	ERA	SO
Ray Burris	29	170.1	7	13	4.02	83
Pat Zachry	28	164.2	6	10	3.01	88
Craig Swan	21	128.1	5	9	3.58	79
Mike Scott	6	29.1	1	1	4.30	13

==== Other pitchers ====
Note: G = Games pitched; IP = Innings pitched; W = Wins; L = Losses; ERA = Earned run average; SO = Strikeouts

Player	G	IP	W	L	ERA	SO
Mark Bomback	36	162.2	10	8	4.09	68
Pete Falcone	37	157.1	7	10	4.52	109
John Pacella	32	84.0	3	4	5.14	68
Roy Lee Jackson	24	70.2	1	7	4.20	58
Ed Lynch	5	19.1	1	1	5.12	9

==== Relief pitchers ====
Note: G = Games pitched; W = Wins; L = Losses; SV = Saves; ERA = Earned run average; SO = Strikeouts

Player	G	W	L	SV	ERA	SO
Neil Allen	59	7	10	22	3.70	79
Jeff Reardon	61	8	7	6	2.61	101
Tom Hausman	55	6	5	1	3.98	53
Ed Glynn	38	3	3	1	4.13	32
Dyar Miller	31	1	2	1	1.93	28
Kevin Kobel	14	1	4	0	7.03	8
Juan Berenguer	6	0	1	0	5.79	7
Scott Holman	4	0	0	0	1.29	3

== Farm system ==
Level	Team	League	Manager
AAA	Tidewater Tides	International League	Frank Verdi
AA	Jackson Mets	Texas League	Bob Wellman
A	Lynchburg Mets	Carolina League	Jack Aker
A-Short Season	Little Falls Mets	New York–Penn League	Dan Monzon
Rookie	Kingsport Mets	Appalachian League	Chuck Hiller
