= 1980 Pittsburgh Pirates season =

1980 Pittsburgh Pirates
- League: National League
- Division: East
- Ballpark: Three Rivers Stadium
- City: Pittsburgh, Pennsylvania
- Record: 83–79 (.512)
- Divisional place: 3rd
- Owners: John W. Galbreath (majority shareholder); Thomas P. Johnson (minority shareholder)
- General managers: Harding "Pete" Peterson
- Managers: Chuck Tanner
- Television: KDKA-TV; Lanny Frattare, Dave Martin, Nellie Briles
- Radio: KDKA; Lanny Frattare, Dave Martin

The 1980 Pittsburgh Pirates season was the 99th season of the Pittsburgh Pirates franchise; the 94th in the National League. After winning the World Series the previous year, the Pirates finished third in the National League East with a record of 83–79, eight games behind the World Series Champion Philadelphia Phillies.

On August 11, the Pirates led the division by 6 games over the Phillies, but from August 25 to September 9 they lost 13 of 15 games to fall out of first place.

== Regular season ==
=== Season standings ===
NL East
| Team | W | L | Pct. | GB | Home | Road |
|---|---|---|---|---|---|---|
| Philadelphia Phillies | 91 | 71 | .562 | — | 49‍–‍32 | 42‍–‍39 |
| Montreal Expos | 90 | 72 | .556 | 1 | 51‍–‍29 | 39‍–‍43 |
| Pittsburgh Pirates | 83 | 79 | .512 | 8 | 47‍–‍34 | 36‍–‍45 |
| St. Louis Cardinals | 74 | 88 | .457 | 17 | 41‍–‍40 | 33‍–‍48 |
| New York Mets | 67 | 95 | .414 | 24 | 38‍–‍44 | 29‍–‍51 |
| Chicago Cubs | 64 | 98 | .395 | 27 | 37‍–‍44 | 27‍–‍54 |

=== Record vs. opponents ===
1980 National League record Sources:
| Team | ATL | CHC | CIN | HOU | LAD | MON | NYM | PHI | PIT | SD | SF | STL |
|---|---|---|---|---|---|---|---|---|---|---|---|---|
| Atlanta | — | 8–4 | 2–16 | 7–11 | 11–7 | 5–7 | 3–9 | 5–7 | 11–1 | 12–6 | 11–6 | 6–6 |
| Chicago | 4–8 | — | 7–5 | 1–11 | 5–7 | 6–12 | 10–8 | 5–13 | 8–10 | 4–8 | 5–7 | 9–9 |
| Cincinnati | 16–2 | 5–7 | — | 8–10 | 9–9 | 3–9 | 8–4 | 7–5 | 6–6 | 15–3–1 | 7–11 | 5–7 |
| Houston | 11–7 | 11–1 | 10–8 | — | 9–10 | 5–7 | 8–4 | 3–9 | 7–5 | 11–7 | 11–7 | 7–5 |
| Los Angeles | 7–11 | 7–5 | 9–9 | 10–9 | — | 11–1 | 7–5 | 6–6 | 6–6 | 9–9 | 13–5 | 7–5 |
| Montreal | 7–5 | 12–6 | 9–3 | 7–5 | 1–11 | — | 10–8 | 9–9 | 6–12 | 10–2 | 7–5 | 12–6 |
| New York | 9–3 | 8–10 | 4–8 | 4–8 | 5–7 | 8–10 | — | 6–12 | 10–8 | 1–11 | 3–9 | 9–9 |
| Philadelphia | 7-5 | 13–5 | 5–7 | 9–3 | 6–6 | 9–9 | 12–6 | — | 7–11 | 8–4 | 6–6 | 9–9 |
| Pittsburgh | 1–11 | 10–8 | 6–6 | 5–7 | 6–6 | 12–6 | 8–10 | 11–7 | — | 6–6 | 8–4 | 10–8 |
| San Diego | 6–12 | 8–4 | 3–15–1 | 7–11 | 9–9 | 2–10 | 11–1 | 4–8 | 6–6 | — | 10–8 | 7–5 |
| San Francisco | 6–11 | 7–5 | 11–7 | 7–11 | 5–13 | 5–7 | 9–3 | 6–6 | 4–8 | 8–10 | — | 7–5 |
| St. Louis | 6–6 | 9–9 | 7–5 | 5–7 | 5–7 | 6–12 | 9–9 | 9–9 | 8–10 | 5–7 | 5–7 | — |

=== Game log ===
1980 Game Log: 83–79 (Home: 47–34; Away: 36–44)
April: 11–5 (Home: 5–2; Away: 6–3)

| # | Date | Opponent | Score | Win | Loss | Save | Attendance | Record |
|---|---|---|---|---|---|---|---|---|
| 1 | April 10 | @ Cardinals | 0–1 | Vuckovich | **Blyleven** (0–1) | — | 42,867 | 0–1 |
| 2 | April 11 | @ Cardinals | 4–3 | **Jackson** (1–0) | Hood | — | 16,998 | 1–1 |
| 3 | April 12 | @ Cardinals | 7–2 | **Bibby** (1–0) | Fulgham | — | 15,662 | 2–1 |
| 4 | April 13 | @ Cardinals | 3–0 | **Rooker** (1–0) | Martinez | **Jackson** (1) | 16,301 | 3–1 |
| 5 | April 14 | Cubs | 5–4 (10) | **Tekulve** (1–0) | Sutter | — | 44,088 | 4–1 |
| 6 | April 17 | Cardinals | 9–12 | Sykes | **Candelaria** (0–1) | — | 5,233 | 4–2 |
| 7 | April 18 | Cardinals | 12–10 | **Jackson** (2–0) | Knowles | **Tekulve** (1) | 10,196 | 5–2 |
| 8 | April 19 | Cardinals | 1–2 | Fulgham | **Roberts** (0–1) | — | 12,642 | 5–3 |
| 9 | April 20 | Cardinals | 6–3 | **Rooker** (2–0) | Vuckovich | **Tekulve** (2) | 35,567 | 6–3 |
| 10 | April 21 | @ Expos | 7–1 | **Candelaria** (1–1) | Grimsley | — | 10,327 | 7–3 |
| 11 | April 22 | @ Expos | 5–3 | **Bibby** (2–0) | Sanderson | **Tekulve** (3) | 7,373 | 8–3 |
| 12 | April 23 | @ Expos | 2–3 | Rogers | **Blyleven** (0–2) | — | 8,161 | 8–4 |
| 13 | April 25 | @ Cubs | 3–5 | Reuschel | **Rooker** (2–1) | Sutter | 7,714 | 8–5 |
| 14 | April 26 | @ Cubs | 9–2 | **Candelaria** (2–1) | Lamp | — | 32,992 | 9–5 |
| 15 | April 29 | Expos | 5–4 (10) | **Solomon** (1–0) | Sosa | — | 8,498 | 10–5 |
| 16 | April 30 | Expos | 5–0 | **Bibby** (3–0) | Lee | — | 8,545 | 11–5 |

May: 14–13 (Home: 8–6; Away: 6–7)

| # | Date | Opponent | Score | Win | Loss | Save | Attendance | Record |
|---|---|---|---|---|---|---|---|---|
| 17 | May 1 | Expos | 2–1 (10) | **Tekulve** (2–0) | Fryman | — | 8,426 | 12–5 |
| 18 | May 2 | Braves | 1–6 | Niekro | **Rooker** (2–2) | — | 11,476 | 12–6 |
| 19 | May 3 | Braves | 1–3 (10) | Hrabosky | **Jackson** (2–1) | — | 34,104 | 12–7 |
| 20 | May 4 | Braves | 13–4 | **Bibby** (4–0) | Boggs | — | 14,358 | 13–7 |
| 21 | May 6 | Dodgers | 2–1 | **Tekulve** (3–0) | Howe | — | 9,817 | 14–7 |
| 22 | May 7 | Dodgers | 7–6 | **Tekulve** (4–0) | Hough | — | 11,404 | 15–7 |
| 23 | May 9 | @ Padres | 4–3 | **Tekulve** (5–0) | Fingers | — | 34,078 | 16–7 |
| 24 | May 10 | @ Padres | 9–5 | **Robinson** (1–0) | Rasmussen | **Romo** (1) | 18,168 | 17–7 |
| 25 | May 11 | @ Padres | 0–5 | Jones | **Candelaria** (2–2) | — | 22,522 | 17–8 |
| 26 | May 13 | @ Giants | 0–5 | Blue | **Blyleven** (0–3) | — | 13,798 | 17–9 |
| 27 | May 14 | @ Giants | 3–2 | **Bibby** (5–0) | Knepper | **Tekulve** (4) | 8,734 | 18–9 |
| 28 | May 15 | @ Giants | 3–2 (12) | **Romo** (1–0) | Griffin | — | 7,781 | 19–9 |
| 29 | May 16 | @ Dodgers | 6–8 | Reuss | **Tekulve** (5–1) | Sutcliffe | 47,929 | 19–10 |
| 30 | May 17 | @ Dodgers | 1–3 | Sutton | **Blyleven** (0–4) | Howe | 50,082 | 19–11 |
| 31 | May 18 | @ Dodgers | 0–2 | Welch | **Bibby** (5–1) | Howe | 49,867 | 19–12 |
| 32 | May 21 | Padres | 4–3 | **Romo** (2–0) | Fingers | — | | 20–12 |
| 33 | May 21 | Padres | 3–2 | **Jackson** (3–1) | Curtis | **Tekulve** (5) | 17,301 | 21–12 |
| 34 | May 22 | Padres | 4–6 | Shirley | **Tekulve** (5–2) | Fingers | 12,496 | 21–13 |
| 35 | May 23 | Giants | 5–4 (13) | **Jackson** (4–1) | Holland | — | 9,619 | 22–13 |
| 36 | May 24 | Giants | 9–10 (15) | Griffin | **Scurry** (0–1) | — | 11,591 | 22–14 |
| 37 | May 25 | Giants | 2–5 | Blue | **Candelaria** (2–3) | — | 42,626 | 22–15 |
| 38 | May 26 | @ Phillies | 6–7 | Reed | **Tekulve** (5–3) | — | 45,394 | 22–16 |
| 39 | May 27 | @ Phillies | 3–2 (13) | **Romo** (3–0) | Noles | **Tekulve** (6) | 35,989 | 23–16 |
| 40 | May 28 | @ Phillies | 3–6 | Lerch | **Robinson** (1–1) | Reed | 30,209 | 23–17 |
| 41 | May 29 | @ Phillies | 5–4 | **Solomon** (2–0) | Ruthven | **Romo** (2) | 30,630 | 24–17 |
| 42 | May 30 | Mets | 1–5 (6) | Zachry | **Candelaria** (2–4) | — | 17,101 | 24–18 |
| 43 | May 31 | Mets | 5–0 | **Blyleven** (1–4) | Swan | — | 13,901 | 25–18 |

June: 13–16 (Home: 7–3; Away: 6–13)

| # | Date | Opponent | Score | Win | Loss | Save | Attendance | Record |
|---|---|---|---|---|---|---|---|---|
| 44 | June 1 | Mets | 13–3 | **Bibby** (6–1) | Falcone | — | 49,626 | 26–18 |
| 45 | June 2 | Phillies | 9–3 | **Robinson** (2–1) | Lerch | — | 19,990 | 27–18 |
| 46 | June 3 | Phillies | 4–3 | **Jackson** (5–1) | McGraw | — | 22,141 | 28–18 |
| 47 | June 4 | Phillies | 3–4 | Carlton | **Candelaria** (2–5) | — | 31,075 | 28–19 |
| 48 | June 6 | @ Mets | 4–9 | Hausman | **Blyleven** (1–5) | — | 18,352 | 28–20 |
| 49 | June 7 | @ Mets | 5–6 (11) | Allen | **Jackson** (5–2) | — | 13,509 | 28–21 |
| 50 | June 8 | @ Mets | 4–6 | Burris | **Romo** (3–1) | Glynn | | 28–22 |
| 51 | June 8 | @ Mets | 3–0 | **Solomon** (3–0) | Bomback | **Tekulve** (7) | 29,329 | 29–22 |
| 52 | June 10 | @ Reds | 5–3 | **Candelaria** (3–5) | Soto | **Tekulve** (8) | 26,648 | 30–22 |
| 53 | June 11 | @ Reds | 2–3 | Pastore | **Blyleven** (1–6) | — | 29,211 | 30–23 |
| 54 | June 12 | @ Reds | 10–6 | **Bibby** (7–1) | LaCoss | **Romo** (3) | 31,557 | 31–23 |
| 55 | June 13 | Astros | 5–3 | **Solomon** (4–0) | Niekro | **Tekulve** (9) | 31,854 | 32–23 |
| 56 | June 14 | Astros | 3–7 | Ryan | **Robinson** (2–2) | LaCorte | 33,922 | 32–24 |
| 57 | June 15 | Astros | 4–1 | **Candelaria** (4–5) | Forsch | — | 49,541 | 33–24 |
| 58 | June 16 | Reds | 5–3 | **Blyleven** (2–6) | Pastore | **Jackson** (2) | 19,940 | 34–24 |
| 59 | June 17 | Reds | 3–4 | Moskau | **Romo** (3–2) | — | 25,565 | 34–25 |
| 60 | June 18 | @ Braves | 2–3 | Garber | **Tekulve** (5–4) | — | | 34–26 |
| 61 | June 18 | @ Braves | 4–5 | Camp | **Romo** (3–3) | Garber | 17,154 | 34–27 |
| 62 | June 19 | @ Braves | 3–4 | Matula | **Robinson** (2–3) | Bradford | 10,585 | 34–28 |
| 63 | June 20 | @ Astros | 4–6 | Forsch | **Candelaria** (4–6) | Sambito | 35,955 | 34–29 |
| 64 | June 21 | @ Astros | 2–4 | Ruhle | **Blyleven** (2–7) | Sambito | 45,867 | 34–30 |
| 65 | June 22 | @ Astros | 2–1 | **Bibby** (8–1) | Niekro | **Jackson** (3) | 46,213 | 35–30 |
| 66 | June 23 | @ Cardinals | 1–6 | Kaat | **Solomon** (4–1) | — | 20,422 | 35–31 |
| 67 | June 24 | @ Cardinals | 2–3 | Sykes | **Rhoden** (0–1) | — | 21,858 | 35–32 |
| 68 | June 25 | @ Cardinals | 1–4 | Hood | **Candelaria** (4–7) | Seaman | 26,102 | 35–33 |
| 69 | June 27 | @ Expos | 6–4 | **Romo** (4–3) | Rogers | **Robinson** (1) | 44,232 | 36–33 |
| 70 | June 28 | @ Expos | 4–3 | **Bibby** (9–1) | Lea | **Romo** (4) | 38,065 | 37–33 |
| 71 | June 29 | @ Expos | 1–4 | Palmer | **Solomon** (4–2) | Norman | 46,186 | 37–34 |
| 72 | June 30 | Cardinals | 5–4 | **Romo** (5–3) | Hood | — | 16,591 | 38–34 |

July: 18–10 (Home: 10–4; Away: 8–6)

| # | Date | Opponent | Score | Win | Loss | Save | Attendance | Record |
|---|---|---|---|---|---|---|---|---|
| 73 | July 1 | Cardinals | 3–2 (10) | **Jackson** (6–2) | Kaat | — | 17,006 | 39–34 |
| 74 | July 2 | Cardinals | 5–7 (11) | Urrea | **Scurry** (0–2) | — | 15,250 | 39–35 |
| 75 | July 3 | Cubs | 5–3 | **Bibby** (10–1) | Krukow | **Jackson** (4) | 14,062 | 40–35 |
| 76 | July 4 | Cubs | 2–4 | McGlothen | **Solomon** (4–3) | Sutter | | 40–36 |
| 77 | July 4 | Cubs | 1–2 | Capilla | **Robinson** (2–4) | Tidrow | 24,668 | 40–37 |
| 78 | July 5 | Cubs | 5–4 | **Candelaria** (5–7) | Hernandez | **Romo** (5) | 46,372 | 41–37 |
| 79 | July 6 | Cubs | 5–4 (20) | **Bibby** (11–1) | Lamp | — | 25,994 | 42–37 |
**51st All-Star Game in Los Angeles, California**
| 80 | July 10 | @ Mets | 0–2 | Zachry | **Candelaria** (5–8) | — | 21,540 | 42–38 |
| 81 | July 11 | @ Mets | 4–2 | **Blyleven** (3–7) | Swan | **Tekulve** (10) | 30,907 | 43–38 |
| 82 | July 12 | @ Phillies | 4–5 | Saucier | **Tekulve** (5–5) | — | 53,254 | 43–39 |
| 83 | July 13 | @ Phillies | 7–3 | **Robinson** (3–4) | Espinosa | **Tekulve** (11) | 48,132 | 44–39 |
| 84 | July 14 | @ Phillies | 13–11 | **Jackson** (7–2) | Reed | — | 44,245 | 45–39 |
| 85 | July 15 | Giants | 5–2 | **Candelaria** (6–8) | Knepper | **Tekulve** (12) | 17,114 | 46–39 |
| 86 | July 16 | Giants | 3–1 | **Blyleven** (4–7) | Whitson | **Jackson** (5) | 18,226 | 47–39 |
| 87 | July 17 | Giants | 3–2 | **Tekulve** (6–5) | Holland | — | 25,508 | 48–39 |
| 88 | July 18 | Dodgers | 6–4 | **Rhoden** (1–1) | Welch | **Romo** (6) | 30,131 | 49–39 |
| 89 | July 19 | Dodgers | 7–3 | **Solomon** (5–3) | Sutcliffe | — | 28,731 | 50–39 |
| 90 | July 20 | Dodgers | 2–4 | Hooton | **Candelaria** (6–9) | Howe | | 50–40 |
| 91 | July 20 | Dodgers | 8–7 | **Jackson** (8–2) | Castillo | — | 41,932 | 51–40 |
| 92 | July 22 | @ Padres | 4–3 | **Bibby** (12–1) | Lucas | **Tekulve** (13) | 17,504 | 52–40 |
| 93 | July 23 | @ Padres | 2–3 | Fingers | **Romo** (5–4) | — | 14,608 | 52–41 |
| 94 | July 24 | @ Padres | 7–1 | **Blyleven** (5–7) | Shirley | — | 15,746 | 53–41 |
| 95 | July 25 | @ Giants | 5–1 | **Candelaria** (7–9) | Knepper | — | 22,830 | 54–41 |
| 96 | July 26 | @ Giants | 3–4 (10) | Minton | **Jackson** (8–3) | — | 28,566 | 54–42 |
| 97 | July 27 | @ Giants | 6–4 | **Bibby** (13–1) | Bordley | **Tekulve** (14) | 31,186 | 55–42 |
| 98 | July 28 | @ Dodgers | 6–4 | **Rhoden** (2–1) | Welch | **Tekulve** (15) | 46,973 | 56–42 |
| 99 | July 29 | @ Dodgers | 2–10 | Hooton | **Blyleven** (5–8) | — | 47,013 | 56–43 |
| 100 | July 30 | @ Dodgers | 0–3 | Reuss | **Candelaria** (7–10) | — | 50,308 | 56–44 |

August: 14–17 (Home: 8–13; Away: 6–4)

| # | Date | Opponent | Score | Win | Loss | Save | Attendance | Record |
|---|---|---|---|---|---|---|---|---|
| 101 | August 1 | Padres | 0–1 | Mura | **Bibby** (13–2) | Fingers | 22,304 | 56–45 |
| 102 | August 3 | Padres | 2–5 | Curtis | **Rhoden** (2–2) | — | | 56–46 |
| 103 | August 3 | Padres | 1–4 | Shirley | **Robinson** (3–5) | Fingers | 20,517 | 56–47 |
| 104 | August 5 | @ Cubs | 3–11 | Reuschel | **Candelaria** (7–11) | — | 22,939 | 56–48 |
| 105 | August 6 | @ Cubs | 9–7 | **Tekulve** (7–5) | Tidrow | **Romo** (7) | | 57–48 |
| 106 | August 6 | @ Cubs | 2–0 | **Blyleven** (6–8) | Capilla | **Jackson** (6) | 24,305 | 58–48 |
| 107 | August 7 | @ Cubs | 11–3 | **Solomon** (6–3) | Hernandez | — | 28,364 | 59–48 |
| 108 | August 8 | Phillies | 6–5 | **Tekulve** (8–5) | McGraw | **Romo** (8) | 30,354 | 60–48 |
| 109 | August 9 | Phillies | 4–1 | **Candelaria** (8–11) | Espinosa | **Tekulve** (16) | 39,984 | 61–48 |
| 110 | August 10 | Phillies | 7–1 | **Bibby** (14–2) | Lerch | — | | 62–48 |
| 111 | August 10 | Phillies | 4–1 | **Robinson** (4–5) | Larson | **Tekulve** (17) | 37,323 | 63–48 |
| 112 | August 11 | Mets | 2–1 (6) | **Solomon** (7–3) | Jackson | — | 13,790 | 64–48 |
| 113 | August 12 | Mets | 1–3 | Burris | **Rhoden** (2–3) | Allen | 18,754 | 64–49 |
| 114 | August 13 | Mets | 3–5 | Hausman | **Candelaria** (8–12) | Reardon | 19,514 | 64–50 |
| 115 | August 15 | Expos | 7–3 | **Bibby** (15–2) | Rogers | **Tekulve** (18) | 29,721 | 65–50 |
| 116 | August 16 | Expos | 5–0 | **Blyleven** (7–8) | Sanderson | — | 32,390 | 66–50 |
| 117 | August 17 | Expos | 5–1 | **Rhoden** (3–3) | Norman | — | | 67–50 |
| 118 | August 17 | Expos | 2–4 | Gullickson | **Robinson** (4–6) | Fryman | 49,412 | 67–51 |
| 119 | August 19 | @ Astros | 2–5 | Ryan | **Candelaria** (8–13) | Sambito | 39,415 | 67–52 |
| 120 | August 20 | @ Astros | 1–5 | Ruhle | **Bibby** (15–3) | Smith | 32,112 | 67–53 |
| 121 | August 21 | @ Astros | 5–12 | Sambito | **Blyleven** (7–9) | — | 33,884 | 67–54 |
| 122 | August 22 | @ Reds | 4–2 | **Robinson** (5–6) | Moskau | **Tekulve** (19) | 37,936 | 68–54 |
| 123 | August 23 | @ Reds | 2–1 | **Rhoden** (4–3) | Pastore | **Jackson** (7) | 43,482 | 69–54 |
| 124 | August 24 | @ Reds | 5–2 | **Candelaria** (9–13) | LaCoss | — | 37,072 | 70–54 |
| 125 | August 25 | Braves | 6–8 | Hanna | **Bibby** (15–4) | Bradford | 15,657 | 70–55 |
| 126 | August 26 | Braves | 2–4 (10) | Garber | **Tekulve** (8–6) | — | 14,695 | 70–56 |
| 127 | August 27 | Braves | 4–7 | Matula | **Robinson** (5–7) | Hrabosky | 12,363 | 70–57 |
| 128 | August 28 | Reds | 0–4 | Moskau | **Rhoden** (4–4) | — | 17,406 | 70–58 |
| 129 | August 29 | Reds | 7–8 | Soto | **Tekulve** (8–7) | Hume | 41,494 | 70–59 |
| 130 | August 30 | Reds | 3–5 | Seaver | **Bibby** (15–5) | — | 24,493 | 70–60 |
| 131 | August 31 | Reds | 4–5 | LaCoss | **Blyleven** (7–10) | Soto | 21,774 | 70–61 |

September: 10–17 (Home: 7–5; Away: 3–11)

| # | Date | Opponent | Score | Win | Loss | Save | Attendance | Record |
|---|---|---|---|---|---|---|---|---|
| 132 | September 1 | Astros | 4–10 | Smith | **Robinson** (5–8) | — | | 70–62 |
| 133 | September 1 | Astros | 7–5 | **Rhoden** (5–4) | Pladson | **Jackson** (8) | 26,374 | 71–62 |
| 134 | September 3 | Astros | 10–4 | **Candelaria** (10–13) | Andujar | **Romo** (9) | 18,502 | 72–62 |
| 135 | September 5 | @ Braves | 4–7 | Camp | **Tekulve** (8–8) | — | 29,610 | 72–63 |
| 136 | September 6 | @ Braves | 2–3 | Niekro | **Blyleven** (7–11) | Garber | 17,821 | 72–64 |
| 137 | September 7 | @ Braves | 5–6 | Bradford | **Tekulve** (8–9) | Camp | 19,762 | 72–65 |
| 138 | September 8 | @ Phillies | 2–6 | McGraw | **Romo** (5–5) | — | 40,576 | 72–66 |
| 139 | September 9 | @ Phillies | 4–5 (14) | Brusstar | **Lee** (0–1) | — | 43,333 | 72–67 |
| 140 | September 10 | @ Cardinals | 7–6 | **Bibby** (16–5) | Hood | **Romo** (10) | 10,300 | 73–67 |
| 141 | September 11 | @ Cardinals | 2–1 | **Blyleven** (8–11) | Martin | — | 7,521 | 74–67 |
| 142 | September 12 | @ Expos | 0–1 | Sanderson | **Rhoden** (5–5) | — | 36,992 | 74–68 |
| 143 | September 13 | @ Expos | 4–0 | **Robinson** (6–8) | Rogers | — | 51,305 | 75–68 |
| 144 | September 14 | @ Expos | 0–4 | Gullickson | **Candelaria** (10–14) | — | 56,137 | 75–69 |
| 145 | September 16 | Phillies | 3–2 | **Bibby** (17–5) | Ruthven | **Tekulve** (20) | 22,239 | 76–69 |
| 146 | September 17 | Phillies | 4–5 (11) | McGraw | **Tekulve** (8–10) | Lyle | 23,650 | 76–70 |
| 147 | September 19 | Mets | 4–3 | **Rhoden** (6–5) | Lynch | — | 17,593 | 77–70 |
| 148 | September 20 | Mets | 6–9 (11) | Allen | **Tekulve** (8–11) | Miller | 22,084 | 77–71 |
| 149 | September 21 | Mets | 9–4 | **Candelaria** (11–14) | Burris | — | 20,320 | 78–71 |
| 150 | September 22 | Expos | 4–2 | **Bibby** (18–5) | Sanderson | **Tekulve** (21) | 18,416 | 79–71 |
| 151 | September 23 | Expos | 1–7 | Rogers | **Blyleven** (8–12) | — | 26,729 | 79–72 |
| 152 | September 24 | Cardinals | 6–3 | **Rhoden** (7–5) | Martin | **Jackson** (9) | 4,297 | 80–72 |
| 153 | September 25 | Cardinals | 2–10 | Kaat | **Robinson** (6–9) | — | 6,805 | 80–73 |
| 154 | September 26 | @ Cubs | 8–9 | Caudill | **Tekulve** (8–12) | — | 3,941 | 80–74 |
| 155 | September 27 | @ Cubs | 0–2 | Martz | **Bibby** (18–6) | Tidrow | 15,565 | 80–75 |
| 156 | September 28 | @ Cubs | 2–3 | Krukow | **Blyleven** (8–13) | Caudill | 10,305 | 80–76 |
| 157 | September 29 | ="@ "Mets | 4–5 (10) | Reardon | **Jackson** (8–4) | — | 1,787 | 80–77 |
| 158 | September 30 | @ Mets | 2–3 | Falcone | **Robinson** (6–10) | — | 1,754 | 80–78 |

October: 3–1 (Home: 2–1; Away: 1–0)

| # | Date | Opponent | Score | Win | Loss | Save | Attendance | Record |
|---|---|---|---|---|---|---|---|---|
| 159 | October 1 | @ Mets | 10–5 | **Bibby** (19–6) | Burris | **Romo** (11) | 2,392 | 81–78 |
| 160 | October 3 | Cubs | 3–1 | **Jefferson** (1–0) | Reuschel | **Candelaria** (1) | 5,270 | 82–78 |
| 161 | October 4 | Cubs | 0–6 | McGlothen | **Perez** (0–1) | — | 2,717 | 82–79 |
| 162 | October 5 | Cubs | 1–0 | **Robinson** (7–10) | Capilla | — | 20,588 | 83–79 |

Legend: = Win = Loss
Bold = Pirates team member

== Roster ==
1980 Pittsburgh Pirates
Roster
| Pitchers: 26 Jim Bibby; 22 Bert Blyleven; 45 John Candelaria; 41 Andy Hassler; 23 Grant Jackson; 51 Jesse Jefferson; 46 Mark Lee; 30 Mickey Mahler; 25 Pascual Pérez; 29 Rick Rhoden; 49 Dave Roberts; 43 Don Robinson; 15 Enrique Romo; 19 Jim Rooker; 47 Rod Scurry; 44 Eddie Solomon; 27 Kent Tekulve | Catchers: 16 Steve Nicosia; 14 Ed Ott; 6 Tony Peña; Infielders: 12 Bob Beall; 4 Dale Berra; 11 Kurt Bevacqua; 10 Tim Foli; 3 Phil Garner; 49 Vance Law; 5 Bill Madlock; 34 John Milner; 28 Bill Robinson; 35 Manny Sanguillén; 8 Willie Stargell | Outfielders: 36 Matt Alexander; 2 Bernie Carbo; 24 Mike Easler; 17 Lee Lacy; 18 Omar Moreno; 39 Dave Parker | Manager: 7 Chuck Tanner; Coaches: 31 Harvey Haddix (Pitching); 32 Joe Lonnett (Third base); 42 Alex Monchak (First base); 48 Bob Skinner (Hitting) |

=== Opening Day Lineup ===
Opening Day Starters
| # | Name | Position |
|---|---|---|
| 18 | Omar Moreno | CF |
| 10 | Tim Foli | SS |
| 39 | Dave Parker | RF |
| 8 | Willie Stargell | 1B |
| 34 | John Milner | LF |
| 5 | Bill Madlock | 3B |
| 14 | Ed Ott | C |
| 3 | Phil Garner | 2B |
| 22 | Bert Blyleven | P |

== Player stats ==
Batting

Note: G = Games played; AB = At bats; H = Hits; Avg. = Batting average; HR = Home runs; RBI = Runs batted in

Regular season
| Player | G | AB | H | Avg. | HR | RBI |
|---|---|---|---|---|---|---|
| E. Romo | 75 | 11 | 5 | 0.455 | 1 | 4 |
| T. Peña | 8 | 21 | 9 | 0.429 | 0 | 1 |
| R. Rhoden | 20 | 40 | 15 | 0.375 | 1 | 11 |
| M. Easler | 132 | 393 | 133 | 0.338 | 21 | 74 |
| L. Lacy | 109 | 278 | 93 | 0.335 | 7 | 33 |
| M. Alexander | 37 | 3 | 1 | 0.333 | 0 | 0 |
| B. Carbo | 7 | 6 | 2 | 0.333 | 0 | 1 |
| D. Robinson | 30 | 57 | 19 | 0.333 | 1 | 8 |
| D. Parker | 139 | 518 | 153 | 0.295 | 17 | 79 |
| B. Robinson | 100 | 272 | 78 | 0.287 | 12 | 36 |
| B. Madlock | 137 | 494 | 137 | 0.277 | 10 | 53 |
| T. Foli | 127 | 495 | 131 | 0.265 | 3 | 38 |
| W. Stargell | 67 | 202 | 53 | 0.262 | 11 | 38 |
| E. Ott | 120 | 392 | 102 | 0.260 | 8 | 41 |
| P. Garner | 151 | 548 | 142 | 0.259 | 5 | 58 |
| P. Pérez | 2 | 4 | 1 | 0.250 | 0 | 0 |
| M. Sanguillén | 47 | 48 | 12 | 0.250 | 0 | 2 |
| R. Scurry | 20 | 4 | 1 | 0.250 | 0 | 0 |
| O. Moreno | 162 | 676 | 168 | 0.249 | 2 | 36 |
| J. Milner | 114 | 238 | 58 | 0.244 | 8 | 34 |
| V. Law | 25 | 74 | 17 | 0.230 | 0 | 3 |
| D. Berra | 93 | 245 | 54 | 0.220 | 6 | 31 |
| E. Solomon | 27 | 32 | 7 | 0.219 | 0 | 1 |
| S. Nicosia | 60 | 176 | 38 | 0.216 | 1 | 22 |
| J. Candelaria | 35 | 77 | 15 | 0.195 | 0 | 7 |
| K. Bevacqua | 22 | 43 | 7 | 0.163 | 0 | 4 |
| J. Bibby | 35 | 77 | 12 | 0.156 | 1 | 7 |
| J. Rooker | 4 | 7 | 1 | 0.143 | 1 | 2 |
| B. Blyleven | 37 | 61 | 5 | 0.082 | 0 | 2 |
| B. Beall | 3 | 3 | 0 | 0.000 | 0 | 0 |
| A. Hassler | 6 | 2 | 0 | 0.000 | 0 | 0 |
| G. Jackson | 61 | 10 | 0 | 0.000 | 0 | 0 |
| J. Jefferson | 1 | 1 | 0 | 0.000 | 0 | 0 |
| K. Tekulve | 78 | 9 | 0 | 0.000 | 0 | 0 |
| M. Lee | 4 | 0 | 0 | — | 0 | 0 |
| M. Mahler | 2 | 0 | 0 | — | 0 | 0 |
| D. Roberts | 2 | 0 | 0 | — | 0 | 0 |
| Team totals | 162 | 5,517 | 1,469 | 0.266 | 116 | 626 |

Pitching

Note: G = Games pitched; IP = Innings pitched; W = Wins; L = Losses; ERA = Earned run average; SO = Strikeouts

Regular season
| Player | G | IP | W | L | ERA | SO |
|---|---|---|---|---|---|---|
| J. Jefferson | 1 | 6 2/3 | 1 | 0 | 1.35 | 4 |
| R. Scurry | 20 | 37 2/3 | 0 | 2 | 2.15 | 28 |
| E. Solomon | 26 | 100 1/3 | 7 | 3 | 2.69 | 35 |
| G. Jackson | 61 | 71 | 8 | 4 | 2.92 | 31 |
| E. Romo | 74 | 123 2/3 | 5 | 5 | 3.27 | 82 |
| J. Bibby | 35 | 238 1/3 | 19 | 6 | 3.32 | 144 |
| K. Tekulve | 78 | 93 | 8 | 12 | 3.39 | 47 |
| J. Rooker | 4 | 18 | 2 | 2 | 3.50 | 8 |
| P. Pérez | 2 | 12 | 0 | 1 | 3.75 | 7 |
| B. Blyleven | 34 | 216 2/3 | 8 | 13 | 3.82 | 168 |
| R. Rhoden | 20 | 126 2/3 | 7 | 5 | 3.84 | 70 |
| A. Hassler | 6 | 11 2/3 | 0 | 0 | 3.86 | 4 |
| D. Roberts | 2 | 2 1/3 | 0 | 1 | 3.86 | 1 |
| D. Robinson | 29 | 160 1/3 | 7 | 10 | 3.99 | 103 |
| J. Candelaria | 35 | 233 1/3 | 11 | 14 | 4.01 | 97 |
| M. Lee | 4 | 5 2/3 | 0 | 1 | 4.76 | 2 |
| M. Mahler | 2 | 1 | 0 | 0 | 63.00 | 1 |
| Team totals | 162 | 1,458 1/3 | 83 | 79 | 3.58 | 832 |

== Awards and honors ==
=== All-Stars ===
1980 Major League Baseball All-Star Game

- Dave Parker, starter, outfield
- Jim Bibby, reserve
- Phil Garner, reserve
- Kent Tekulve, reserve

== Transactions ==
- November 1, 1979 – Dock Ellis granted free agency.
- November 1, 1979 – Bruce Kison granted free agency.
- November 1, 1979 – Rennie Stennett granted free agency.
- November 21, 1979 – Signed Andy Hassler as a free agent.
- November 24, 1979 – Signed Cecilio Guante as an amateur free agent.
- December 21, 1979 – Traded John Burden (minors) and Larry Littleton to the Cleveland Indians. Received Larry Andersen.
- January 11, 1980 – Drafted Keith Creel in the 1st round (6th pick) of the 1980 amateur draft (January Secondary), but did not sign the player.
- January 11, 1980 – Drafted Tom Nieto in the 3rd round of the 1980 amateur draft (January Secondary), but did not sign the player.
- January 11, 1980 – Drafted Bill Bathe in the 10th round of the 1980 amateur draft (January), but did not sign the player.
- March 28, 1980 – Traded a player to be named later to the Atlanta Braves. Received Eddie Solomon. The Pittsburgh Pirates sent Greg Field (minors) (April 25, 1980) to the Atlanta Braves to complete the trade.
- April 1, 1980 – Traded a player to be named later and cash to the Seattle Mariners. Received Odell Jones. The Pittsburgh Pirates sent Larry Andersen (October 29, 1980) to the Seattle Mariners to complete the trade.
- April 5, 1980 – Signed Dale Mohorcic as a free agent.
- April 10, 1980 – Signed Mickey Mahler as a free agent.
- April 24, 1980 – Sold Dave Roberts to the Seattle Mariners.
- May 16, 1980 – Signed Ramon Pena as an amateur free agent.
- June 3, 1980 – Drafted Rick Renteria in the 1st round (20th pick) of the 1980 amateur draft.
- June 3, 1980 – Drafted Tim Burke in the 2nd round of the 1980 amateur draft.
- June 3, 1980 – Drafted Joe Orsulak in the 6th round of the 1980 amateur draft. Player signed August 20, 1980.
- June 10, 1980 – Sold Andy Hassler to the California Angels.
- June 23, 1980 – Signed Trench Davis as an amateur free agent.
- July 10, 1980 – Signed Rafael Belliard as an amateur free agent.
- July 16, 1980 – Traded Jerry McDonald (minors) to the Atlanta Braves. Received Bob Beall.
- August 5, 1980 – Traded Rick Lancellotti and Luis Salazar to the San Diego Padres. Received a player to be named later and Kurt Bevacqua. The San Diego Padres sent Mark Lee (August 12, 1980) to the Pittsburgh Pirates to complete the trade.
- August 20, 1980 – Released Alberto Lois.
- August 21, 1980 – Signed Ravelo Manzanillo as an amateur free agent.
- September 1, 1980 – Signed Bernie Carbo as a free agent.
- September 11, 1980 – Selected Jesse Jefferson off waivers from the Toronto Blue Jays.
- October 8, 1980 – Released Bernie Carbo.
- October 10, 1980 – Released Jim Rooker.
- October 21, 1980 – Released Gene Pentz.

== Farm system ==
| Level | Team | League | Manager |
|---|---|---|---|
| AAA | Portland Beavers | Pacific Coast League | Jim Mahoney |
| AA | Buffalo Bisons | Eastern League | Steve Demeter |
| A | Salem Pirates | Carolina League | Johnny Lipon |
| A | Shelby Pirates | South Atlantic League | Joe Frisina |
| Rookie | GCL Pirates | Gulf Coast League | Woody Huyke |
