= 1980 Cincinnati Reds season =

1980 Cincinnati Reds
- League: National League
- Division: West
- Ballpark: Riverfront Stadium
- City: Cincinnati
- Record: 89–73 (.549)
- Divisional place: 3rd
- Owners: Louis Nippert
- General managers: Dick Wagner
- Managers: John McNamara
- Television: WLWT (Ray Lane, Bill Brown, Dick Carlson)
- Radio: WLW (Marty Brennaman, Joe Nuxhall, Dick Carlson)

The 1980 Cincinnati Reds season was the 111th season for the franchise in Major League Baseball, and their 11th (and 10th full) season at Riverfront Stadium. The Reds finished in third place in the National League West with a record of 89-73, 3½ games behind the Houston Astros, marking the first time since 1971 that the Reds did not finish in either first or second place. The Reds were managed by John McNamara and played their home games at Riverfront Stadium.

== Offseason ==
- December 3, 1979: Doug Corbett was drafted from the Reds by the Minnesota Twins in the 1979 rule 5 draft.

== Regular season ==
On July 4, pitcher Nolan Ryan of the Houston Astros recorded the 3000th strikeout of his career by striking out Reds player César Gerónimo.

=== Season standings ===
NL West
Team	W	L	Pct.	GB	Home	Road
Houston Astros	93	70	.571	—	55‍–‍26	38‍–‍44
Los Angeles Dodgers	92	71	.564	1	55‍–‍27	37‍–‍44
Cincinnati Reds	89	73	.549	3½	44‍–‍37	45‍–‍36
Atlanta Braves	81	80	.503	11	50‍–‍30	31‍–‍50
San Francisco Giants	75	86	.466	17	44‍–‍37	31‍–‍49
San Diego Padres	73	89	.451	19½	45‍–‍36	28‍–‍53

=== Record vs. opponents ===
1980 National League record Sources:
Team	ATL	CHC	CIN	HOU	LAD	MON	NYM	PHI	PIT	SD	SF	STL
Atlanta	—	8–4	2–16	7–11	11–7	5–7	3–9	5–7	11–1	12–6	11–6	6–6
Chicago	4–8	—	7–5	1–11	5–7	6–12	10–8	5–13	8–10	4–8	5–7	9–9
Cincinnati	16–2	5–7	—	8–10	9–9	3–9	8–4	7–5	6–6	15–3–1	7–11	5–7
Houston	11–7	11–1	10–8	—	9–10	5–7	8–4	3–9	7–5	11–7	11–7	7–5
Los Angeles	7–11	7–5	9–9	10–9	—	11–1	7–5	6–6	6–6	9–9	13–5	7–5
Montreal	7–5	12–6	9–3	7–5	1–11	—	10–8	9–9	6–12	10–2	7–5	12–6
New York	9–3	8–10	4–8	4–8	5–7	8–10	—	6–12	10–8	1–11	3–9	9–9
Philadelphia	7-5	13–5	5–7	9–3	6–6	9–9	12–6	—	7–11	8–4	6–6	9–9
Pittsburgh	1–11	10–8	6–6	5–7	6–6	12–6	8–10	11–7	—	6–6	8–4	10–8
San Diego	6–12	8–4	3–15–1	7–11	9–9	2–10	11–1	4–8	6–6	—	10–8	7–5
San Francisco	6–11	7–5	11–7	7–11	5–13	5–7	9–3	6–6	4–8	8–10	—	7–5
St. Louis	6–6	9–9	7–5	5–7	5–7	6–12	9–9	9–9	8–10	5–7	5–7	—

=== Notable transactions ===
- June 3, 1980: 1980 Major League Baseball draft
  - Ron Robinson was drafted by the Reds in the 1st round (19th pick).
  - Danny Tartabull was drafted by the Reds in the 3rd round. Player signed June 10, 1980.
  - Eric Davis was drafted by the Reds in the 8th round. Player signed June 8, 1980.
- June 13, 1980: Joe Nolan was signed as a free agent by the Reds.

=== Roster ===
1980 Cincinnati Reds
Roster
Pitchers: 40 Doug Bair; 38 Bruce Berenyi; 42 Bill Bonham; 34 Sheldon Burnside; 48 Geoff Combe; 43 Jay Howell; 47 Tom Hume; 51 Mike LaCoss; 44 Charlie Leibrandt; 31 Paul Moskau; 35 Frank Pastore; 49 Joe Price; 41 Tom Seaver; 36 Mario Soto; 37 Dave Tomlin	Catchers: 5 Johnny Bench; 9 Vic Correll; 17 Joe Nolan; 19 Don Werner; Infielders: 23 Rick Auerbach; 13 Dave Concepción; 22 Dan Driessen; 26 Junior Kennedy; 25 Ray Knight; 16 Ron Oester; 12 Harry Spilman	Outfielders: 29 Dave Collins; 7 Héctor Cruz; 15 George Foster; 20 César Gerónimo; 30 Ken Griffey; 56 Paul Householder; 28 Sam Mejías; Other batters: 57 Eddie Milner	Manager: 3 John McNamara; Coaches: 4 Harry Dunlop; 6 Bill Fischer; 2 Russ Nixon; 11 Ron Plaza

== Player stats ==
=== Batting ===
==== Starters by position ====
Note: Pos = Position; G = Games played; AB = At bats; H = Hits; Avg. = Batting average; HR = Home runs; RBI = Runs batted in

Pos	Player	G	AB	H	Avg.	HR	RBI
C	Johnny Bench	114	360	90	.250	24	68
1B	Dan Driessen	154	524	139	.265	14	74
2B	Junior Kennedy	104	337	88	.261	1	34
3B	Ray Knight	162	618	163	.264	14	78
SS	Dave Concepción	156	622	162	.260	5	77
LF	George Foster	144	528	144	.273	25	93
CF	Dave Collins	144	551	167	.303	3	35
RF	Ken Griffey	146	544	160	.294	13	85

==== Other batters ====
Note: G = Games played; AB = At bats; H = Hits; Avg. = Batting average; HR = Home runs; RBI = Runs batted in

Player	G	AB	H	Avg.	HR	RBI
Ron Oester	100	303	84	.277	2	20
Joe Nolan	53	154	48	.312	3	24
César Gerónimo	103	145	37	.255	2	9
Sam Mejías	71	108	30	.278	1	10
Harry Spilman	65	101	27	.267	4	19
Héctor Cruz	52	75	16	.213	1	5
Don Werner	24	64	11	.172	0	5
Paul Householder	20	45	11	.244	0	7
Rick Auerbach	24	33	11	.333	1	4
Vic Correll	10	19	8	.421	0	3
Eddie Milner	6	3	0	.000	0	0

=== Pitching ===
==== Starting pitchers ====
Note: G = Games pitched; IP = Innings pitched; W = Wins; L = Losses; ERA = Earned run average; SO = Strikeouts

Player	G	IP	W	L	ERA	SO
Frank Pastore	27	184.2	13	7	3.27	110
Charlie Leibrandt	36	173.2	10	9	4.25	62
Mike LaCoss	34	169.1	10	12	4.62	59
Tom Seaver	26	168.0	10	8	3.64	101
Bruce Berenyi	6	27.2	2	2	7.81	19
Bill Bonham	4	19.0	2	1	4.74	13

==== Other pitchers ====
Note: G = Games pitched; IP = Innings pitched; W = Wins; L = Losses; ERA = Earned run average; SO = Strikeouts

Player	G	IP	W	L	ERA	SO
Mario Soto	53	190.1	10	8	3.07	182
Paul Moskau	33	152.2	9	7	4.01	94
Joe Price	24	111.1	7	3	3.56	44

==== Relief pitchers ====
Note: G = Games pitched; W = Wins; L = Losses; SV = Saves; ERA = Earned run average; SO = Strikeouts

Player	G	W	L	SV	ERA	SO
Tom Hume	78	9	10	25	2.56	68
Doug Bair	61	3	6	6	4.24	62
Dave Tomlin	27	3	0	0	5.54	6
Sheldon Burnside	7	1	0	0	1.93	2
Jay Howell	5	0	0	0	13.50	1
Geoff Combe	4	0	0	0	10.80	10

== Farm system ==
Level	Team	League	Manager
AAA	Indianapolis Indians	American Association	Jim Beauchamp
AA	Waterbury Reds	Eastern League	Mike Compton
A	Tampa Tarpons	Florida State League	George Scherger
A	Cedar Rapids Reds	Midwest League	Jim Lett
A-Short Season	Eugene Emeralds	Northwest League	Greg Riddoch
Rookie	Billings Mustangs	Pioneer League	Jim Hoff

LEAGUE CO-CHAMPIONS: Eugene
