= 1980 Chicago Cubs season =

1980 Chicago Cubs
- League: National League
- Division: East
- Ballpark: Wrigley Field
- City: Chicago
- Record: 64–98 (.395)
- Divisional place: 6th
- Owners: William Wrigley III
- General managers: Bob Kennedy
- Managers: Preston Gómez, Joey Amalfitano
- Television: WGN-TV (Jack Brickhouse, Lou Boudreau, Milo Hamilton)
- Radio: WGN (Vince Lloyd, Lou Boudreau)
- Stats: ESPN.com; Baseball Reference

The 1980 Chicago Cubs season was the 109th season of the Chicago Cubs franchise, the 105th in the National League and the 65th at Wrigley Field. The Cubs finished sixth and last in the National League East with a record of 64–98.

== Offseason ==
- October 3, 1979: Ken Holtzman was released by the Cubs.
- October 17, 1979: Donnie Moore was traded by the Cubs to the St. Louis Cardinals for Mike Tyson.
- January 11, 1980: 1980 Major League Baseball draft
  - Jim Eppard was drafted by the Cubs in the 11th round, but did not sign.
  - Tom Henke was drafted by the Cubs in the 1st round (24th pick) of the secondary phase, but did not sign.
- February 5, 1980: Derek Botelho was released by the Cubs.

== Regular season ==
=== Season standings ===
NL East
Team	W	L	Pct.	GB	Home	Road
Philadelphia Phillies	91	71	.562	—	49‍–‍32	42‍–‍39
Montreal Expos	90	72	.556	1	51‍–‍29	39‍–‍43
Pittsburgh Pirates	83	79	.512	8	47‍–‍34	36‍–‍45
St. Louis Cardinals	74	88	.457	17	41‍–‍40	33‍–‍48
New York Mets	67	95	.414	24	38‍–‍44	29‍–‍51
Chicago Cubs	64	98	.395	27	37‍–‍44	27‍–‍54

=== Record vs. opponents ===
1980 National League record Sources:
Team	ATL	CHC	CIN	HOU	LAD	MON	NYM	PHI	PIT	SD	SF	STL
Atlanta	—	8–4	2–16	7–11	11–7	5–7	3–9	5–7	11–1	12–6	11–6	6–6
Chicago	4–8	—	7–5	1–11	5–7	6–12	10–8	5–13	8–10	4–8	5–7	9–9
Cincinnati	16–2	5–7	—	8–10	9–9	3–9	8–4	7–5	6–6	15–3–1	7–11	5–7
Houston	11–7	11–1	10–8	—	9–10	5–7	8–4	3–9	7–5	11–7	11–7	7–5
Los Angeles	7–11	7–5	9–9	10–9	—	11–1	7–5	6–6	6–6	9–9	13–5	7–5
Montreal	7–5	12–6	9–3	7–5	1–11	—	10–8	9–9	6–12	10–2	7–5	12–6
New York	9–3	8–10	4–8	4–8	5–7	8–10	—	6–12	10–8	1–11	3–9	9–9
Philadelphia	7-5	13–5	5–7	9–3	6–6	9–9	12–6	—	7–11	8–4	6–6	9–9
Pittsburgh	1–11	10–8	6–6	5–7	6–6	12–6	8–10	11–7	—	6–6	8–4	10–8
San Diego	6–12	8–4	3–15–1	7–11	9–9	2–10	11–1	4–8	6–6	—	10–8	7–5
San Francisco	6–11	7–5	11–7	7–11	5–13	5–7	9–3	6–6	4–8	8–10	—	7–5
St. Louis	6–6	9–9	7–5	5–7	5–7	6–12	9–9	9–9	8–10	5–7	5–7	—

=== Notable transactions ===
- June 3, 1980: Don Schulze was drafted in the 1st round (11th pick) of the 1980 Major League Baseball draft.
- June 7, 1980: Henry Cotto was signed as an amateur free agent by the Cubs.
- July 14, 1980: Rolando Roomes was signed as an amateur free agent by the Cubs.

== Roster ==
1980 Chicago Cubs
Roster
Pitchers: 35 Doug Capilla; 36 Bill Caudill; 38 Willie Hernández; 39 Mike Krukow; 47 Dennis Lamp; 34 Randy Martz; 40 Lynn McGlothen; 48 Rick Reuschel; 37 George Riley; 46 Lee Smith; 42 Bruce Sutter; 41 Dick Tidrow	Catchers: 9 Tim Blackwell; 8 Barry Foote; 16 Bill Hayes; 6 Mike O'Berry; Infielders: 33 Larry Biittner; 22 Bill Buckner; 11 Iván DeJesús; 15 Steve Dillard; 7 Cliff Johnson; 20 Mick Kelleher; 12 Steve Macko; 16 Steve Ontiveros; 21 Lenny Randle; 2 Mike Tyson	Outfielders: 17 Jesús Figueroa; 24 Ken Henderson; 10 Dave Kingman; 30 Carlos Lezcano; 28 Jerry Martin; 25 Scot Thompson; 23 Jim Tracy; 27 Mike Vail	Manager: 5 Joey Amalfitano; 18 Preston Gómez; Coaches: 5 Joey Amalfitano; 3 Gene Clines; 4 Mike Roarke; 1 Cookie Rojas; 26 Billy Williams

== Player stats ==
= Indicates team leader

=== Batting ===
==== Starters by position ====
Note: Pos = Position; G = Games played; AB = At bats; H = Hits; Avg. = Batting average; HR = Home runs; RBI = Runs batted in

Pos	Player	G	AB	H	Avg.	HR	RBI
C	Tim Blackwell	103	320	87	.272	5	30
1B	Bill Buckner	145	578	187	.324	10	68
2B	Mike Tyson	123	341	81	.238	3	23
SS	Iván DeJesús	157	618	160	.259	3	33
3B	Lenny Randle	130	489	135	.276	5	39
LF	Dave Kingman	81	255	71	.278	18	57
CF	Jerry Martin	141	494	112	.227	23	73
RF	Mike Vail	114	312	93	.298	6	47

==== Other batters ====
Note: G = Games played; AB = At bats; H = Hits; Avg. = Batting average; HR = Home runs; RBI = Runs batted in

Player	G	AB	H	Avg.	HR	RBI
Larry Biitner	127	273	68	.249	1	34
Steve Dillard	100	244	55	.225	4	27
Scot Thompson	102	226	48	.212	2	13
Barry Foote	63	202	48	.238	6	28
Jesús Figueroa	115	198	50	.253	1	11
Cliff Johnson	68	196	46	.235	10	34
Jim Tracy	42	122	31	.254	3	9
Mick Kelleher	105	96	14	.146	0	4
Carlos Lezcano	42	88	18	.205	3	12
Ken Henderson	44	82	16	.195	2	9
Steve Ontiveros	31	77	16	.208	1	3
Mike O'Berry	19	48	10	.208	0	5
Steve Macko	6	20	6	.300	0	2
Bill Hayes	4	9	2	.222	0	0

=== Pitching ===
==== Starting pitchers ====
Note: G = Games pitched; IP = Innings pitched; W = Wins; L = Losses; ERA = Earned run average; SO = Strikeouts

Player	G	IP	W	L	ERA	SO
Rick Reuschel	38	257.0	11	13	3.40	140
Mike Krukow	34	205.0	10	15	4.39	130
Dennis Lamp	41	202.2	10	14	5.20	83
Randy Martz	6	30.1	1	2	2.08	5

==== Other pitchers ====
Note: G = Games pitched; IP = Innings pitched; W = Wins; L = Losses; ERA = Earned run average; SO = Strikeouts

Player	G	IP	W	L	ERA	SO
Lynn McGlothen	39	182.1	12	14	4.79	119
Doug Capilla	39	89.2	2	8	4.12	51

==== Relief pitchers ====
Note: G = Games pitched; W = Wins; L = Losses; SV = Saves; ERA = Earned run average; SO = Strikeouts

Player	G	W	L	SV	ERA	SO
Bruce Sutter	60	5	8	28	2.64	76
Dick Tidrow	84	6	5	6	2.79	97
Bill Caudill	72	4	6	1	2.19	112
Willie Hernández	53	1	9	0	4.40	75
George Riley	22	0	4	0	5.75	18
Lee Smith	18	2	0	0	2.91	17

== Farm system ==
Level	Team	League	Manager
AAA	Wichita Aeros	American Association	Jack Hiatt
AA	Midland Cubs	Texas League	Randy Hundley, Les Moss and George Enright
A	Quad Cities Cubs	Midwest League	Jim Napier
A-Short Season	Geneva Cubs	New York–Penn League	Bob Hartsfield
Rookie	GCL Cubs	Gulf Coast League	Rich Morales
