= George Stablein =

American baseball player (born 1957)

- Pitcher
- Born: October 29, 1957 (age 67); Inglewood, California, U.S.
- Batted: Right Threw: Right

MLB debut
- September 20, 1980, for the San Diego Padres

Last MLB appearance
- October 4, 1980, for the San Diego Padres

MLB statistics
- Win–loss record: 0–1
- Earned run average: 3.09
- Strikeouts: 4
- Stats at Baseball Reference

Teams
- San Diego Padres (1980)

George Charles Stablein (born October 29, 1957) is a former Major League Baseball pitcher who played in 1980 with the San Diego Padres. He batted and threw right-handed.

He was drafted by the Padres in the 3rd round of the 1978 amateur draft.
