= Scott Holman (baseball) =

American baseball player

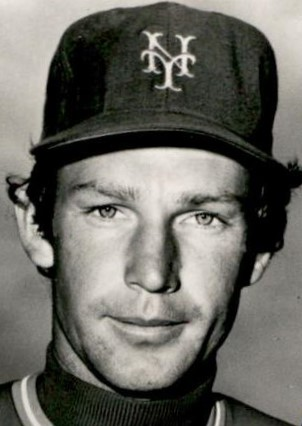
- Pitcher
- Born: September 18, 1958 (age 66); Santa Paula, California, U.S.
- Batted: Right Threw: Right

MLB debut
- September 20, 1980, for the New York Mets

Last MLB appearance
- September 29, 1983, for the New York Mets

MLB statistics
- Win–loss record: 4–10
- Earned run average: 3.34
- Strikeouts: 58
- Stats at Baseball Reference

Teams
- New York Mets (1980, 1982–1983)

Randy Scott Holman (born September 18, 1958) is a former Major League Baseball pitcher. He pitched for the New York Mets in the 1980, 1982, and 1983 baseball seasons.
