= Rich Murray (baseball) =

American baseball player (born 1957)

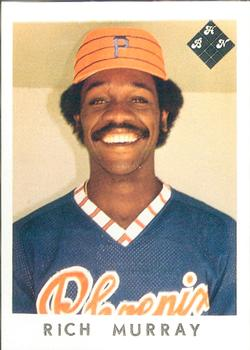
- First baseman
- Born: July 6, 1957 (age 68); Los Angeles, California, U.S.
- Batted: Right Threw: Right

MLB debut
- June 7, 1980, for the San Francisco Giants

Last MLB appearance
- July 4, 1983, for the San Francisco Giants

MLB statistics
- Batting average: .216
- Home runs: 4
- Runs batted in: 25
- Stats at Baseball Reference

Teams
- San Francisco Giants (1980, 1983)

Richard Dale Murray (born July 6, 1957) is a former first baseman in Major League Baseball who played for the San Francisco Giants in its 1980 and 1983 seasons. Listed at 6' 4", 195 lb., he batted and threw right handed.

Born in Los Angeles, California, Murray was selected by the Giants in the sixth round of the 1975 MLB draft.

In a two-season career, Murray hit a slash line of .216/.256/.333 with four home runs, 19 runs scored, and 25 RBI in 57 games played.

== Personal ==
His elder brother, Eddie Murray, also played in the majors.
