= Gary Cooper (outfielder) =

American baseball player (born 1956)

- Outfielder
- Born: December 22, 1956 (age 69); Savannah, Georgia, U.S.
- Batted: Switch Threw: Right

MLB debut
- August 25, 1980, for the Atlanta Braves

Last MLB appearance
- October 5, 1980, for the Atlanta Braves

MLB statistics
- Games played: 21
- At bats: 2
- Batting average: .000
- Runs scored: 3
- Stats at Baseball Reference

Teams
- Atlanta Braves (1980)

Gary Nathaniel Cooper (born December 22, 1956) is an American former professional baseball player. He appeared in 21 games in Major League Baseball for the Atlanta Braves in 1980, but came to the plate only twice. Most of his appearances came as either a pinch runner (he was 2-for-3 on stolen base attempts) or as a late-inning defensive replacement in left field.

Cooper attended Robert W. Groves High School in Garden City, Georgia, where he played baseball and football and ran track.
