= Craig Stimac =

American baseball player (1954-2009)

- Catcher
- Born: November 18, 1954; Oak Park, Illinois
- Died: January 15, 2009 (aged 54); San Marino
- Batted: Right Threw: Right

MLB debut
- August 12, 1980, for the San Diego Padres

Last MLB appearance
- May 18, 1981, for the San Diego Padres

MLB statistics
- Batting average: .203
- Home runs: 0
- Runs batted in: 7
- Stats at Baseball Reference

Teams
- San Diego Padres (1980–1981)

Craig Steven Stimac (November 18, 1954 – January 15, 2009) was an American professional baseball catcher who played in Major League Baseball.

Stimac attended Morton West High School in Illinois and played college baseball at the University of Denver. Playing for the Denver Pioneers between 1973–1976, Stimac set several school records including total hits, home runs, total bases, runs scored, doubles and at bats.

Stimac played parts of two seasons in the majors, 1980 and 1981, for the San Diego Padres. After his major league career, he played in Italy from 1984 to 1989.

Stimac was found dead on January 15, 2009, in San Marino, due to apparent suicide by gunshot.
