= Larry McWilliams =

American baseball player (born 1954)

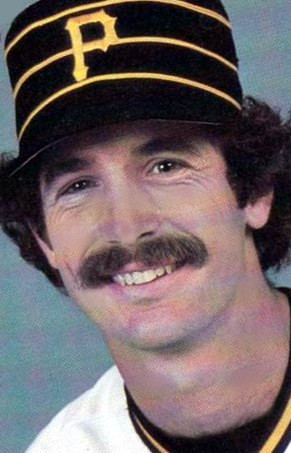
- Pitcher
- Born: February 10, 1954 (age 72); Wichita, Kansas, U.S.
- Batted: Left Threw: Left

MLB debut
- July 17, 1978, for the Atlanta Braves

Last MLB appearance
- May 12, 1990, for the Kansas City Royals

MLB statistics
- Win–loss record: 78–90
- Earned run average: 3.99
- Strikeouts: 940
- Stats at Baseball Reference

Teams
- Atlanta Braves (1978–1982); Pittsburgh Pirates (1982–1986); Atlanta Braves (1987); St. Louis Cardinals (1988); Philadelphia Phillies (1989); Kansas City Royals (1989–1990)

Larry Dean McWilliams (born February 10, 1954) is an American former professional baseball pitcher, who played in Major League Baseball (MLB) for the Atlanta Braves (twice), Pittsburgh Pirates, St. Louis Cardinals, Philadelphia Phillies, and Kansas City Royals, from 1978-1990. During his playing days, he stood 6 feet 5 inches (1.96 m) tall, weighing 180 pounds (82 kg).

== Early life ==
After attending Paris Junior College in Paris, Texas, the Atlanta Braves selected the tall, lanky left-hander in the 1st round (6th overall pick) of the January phase of the 1974 Major League Baseball draft.

== Professional baseball ==
McWilliams was drafted sixth overall by the Atlanta Braves in the 1974 January draft and made his major league debut on July 17, 1978. On August 1, 1978, in what was just the fourth start of McWilliams’ first MLB campaign, he was the winning pitcher (raising his record to 4–0), when the Braves stopped Pete Rose's 44-game hitting streak at Atlanta-Fulton County Stadium.

McWilliams made what was probably the key defensive play to stop the streak when, with two outs in the bottom of the second inning, Rose, in his second plate appearance of the game, lined a pitch up the middle that McWilliams reached back and caught.

McWilliams' best seasons were 1978, his rookie season, when he went 9-3, and 1983, when he posted a 15-8 record with 8 complete games, 4 shutouts, 199 strikeouts, and a 3.25 earned run average (ERA) with the Pittsburgh Pirates. He was nicknamed Spaghetti, by Pirates catcher Tony Pena. "That's what I call him. Take a look at his legs. They look like spaghetti. Real thin." said Pena during a postgame interview, in 1982.

On September 2, 1989, McWilliams was traded from the Philadelphia Phillies to the Kansas City Royals for Minor League Baseball (MiLB) catcher Jeff Hulse. McWilliams retired, after being released by the Royals on May 14, 1990.

== Personal life ==
McWilliams and his wife Vicki have six children and nineteen grandchildren.
