= Rick Matula =

American baseball player (born 1953)

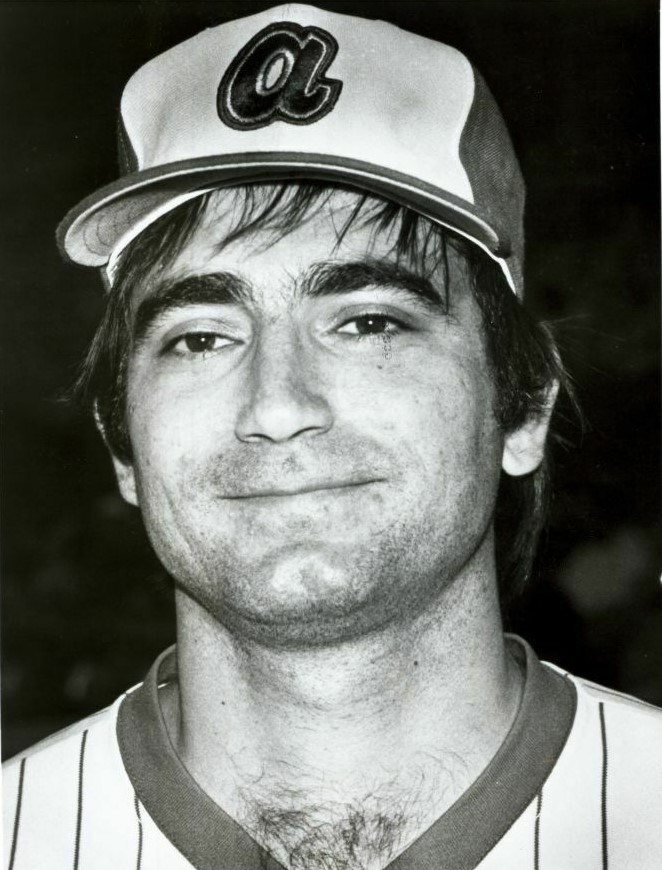
- Pitcher
- Born: November 22, 1953 (age 72); Wharton, Texas, U.S.
- Batted: Right Threw: Right

MLB debut
- April 8, 1979, for the Atlanta Braves

Last MLB appearance
- June 11, 1981, for the Atlanta Braves

MLB statistics
- Win–loss record: 19–23
- Earned run average: 4.41
- Strikeouts: 129
- Stats at Baseball Reference

Teams
- Atlanta Braves (1979–1981)

Richard Carlton Matula [muh-tu'-la] (born November 22, 1953) is an American former starting pitcher in Major League Baseball who played from 1979 to 1981 for the Atlanta Braves. Listed at 6' 0", 190 lb., he batted and threw right handed.

Born in Wharton, Texas, Matula was originally selected by the Montreal Expos in the 16th round of the 1972 MLB draft. But he chose not to sign, instead going on to attend Sam Houston State University. He was drafted again by the Braves in the 14th round of the 1976 draft, and after signing was assigned to the Kingsport Braves. There, Matula went 3–5 with a 2.63 ERA in 20 appearances (48 innings pitched). He also appeared in three games for the Greenwood Braves, posting a 1–0 record and 7.50 ERA in six innings. Overall that season, Matula went 4–5 with a 3.17 ERA in 54 innings.

In 1977, Matula split time between the Greenwood Braves and Savannah Braves. With Greenwood, he went 2–1 with a 2.14 ERA in 21 innings of work. With Savannah, he went 8–5 with a 3.24 ERA in 100 innings (22 games). Combined, he went 10–6 with a 3.05 ERA.

Matula went a combined 10–5 with a 3.12 ERA in 127 innings in 1978. He split time between the Savannah Braves and Richmond Braves.

On April 8, 1979, Matula made his major league debut at the age of 25. Although he gave up no walks and only two earned runs in seven innings of work, he still lost against the Houston Astros starter, Joe Niekro (Niekro pitched a complete game shutout).

He made 28 starts in his rookie season, going 8–10 with a 4.15 ERA in 171.1 innings. He was ahead in most of the 10 games that didn't get the statistic for, when the reliever took the loss. Not a strikeout pitcher, he walked 64 batters and struck out only 67. In 1980, Matula made 33 appearances (30 starts), going 11–13 with a 4.58 ERA. In 176.2 innings, he struck out only 62 batters and his 13 losses were the ninth most in the league.

For the majority of the 1981 season, Matula was in the minors, with the Richmond Braves. He appeared in 16 games for them, making 11 starts and going 7–4 with a 2.97 ERA. He didn't do so well in the majors, making five relief appearances and posting an ERA of 6.43. He played his final major league game on June 11 that year.

On March 29, 1982, he was released by the Braves. He played for the Evansville Triplets in the Detroit Tigers organization and Denver Bears in the Texas Rangers organization, going a combined 3–8 with a 5.62 ERA in 36 appearances, (10 starts).

Overall, Matula made 66 appearances in the majors (58 starts). He went 19–23 with a 4.41 ERA, striking out 129 batters and walking 126 in 355 innings of work. As a batter, he hit .099 in 111 at bats, walking three times and striking out 48 times.

== Sources ==
- Career statistics from MLB · Baseball Reference · Fangraphs · Baseball Reference (Minors) · Retrosheet · Baseball Almanac, or Retrosheet
