= Terry Harper (baseball) =

American baseball player (born 1955)

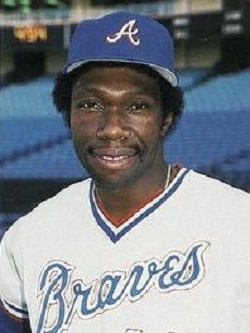
- Outfielder
- Born: August 19, 1955 (age 70); Douglasville, Georgia, U.S.
- Batted: Right Threw: Right

Professional debut
- MLB: September 12, 1980, for the Atlanta Braves
- NPB: April 8, 1988, for the Yakult Swallows

Last appearance
- MLB: October 2, 1987, for the Pittsburgh Pirates
- NPB: April 23, 1988, for the Yakult Swallows

MLB statistics
- Batting average: .253
- Home runs: 36
- Runs batted in: 180

NPB statistics
- Batting average: .143
- Home runs: 2
- Runs batted in: 6
- Stats at Baseball Reference

Teams
- Atlanta Braves (1980–1986); Detroit Tigers (1987); Pittsburgh Pirates (1987); Yakult Swallows (1988)

Terry Joe Harper (born August 19, 1955) is an American former professional baseball player who played outfield in the Major Leagues from 1980–1987. He played for the Atlanta Braves, Pittsburgh Pirates, and Detroit Tigers, as well as one season for the Yakult Swallows in Japan. Harper now works as a hitting coach in the Atlanta area.
