= Larry Bradford =

American baseball player (1949-1998)

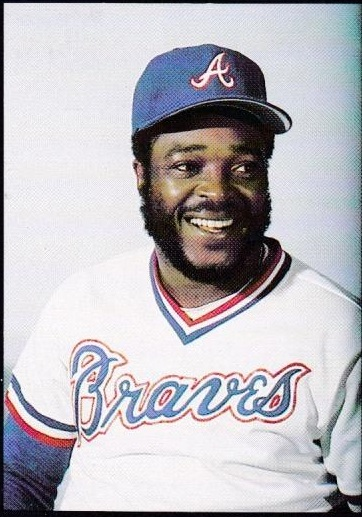
- Pitcher
- Born: December 21, 1949; Chicago, Illinois, U.S.
- Died: September 11, 1998 (aged 48); Atlanta, Georgia, U.S.
- Batted: Right Threw: Left

MLB debut
- September 24, 1977, for the Atlanta Braves

Last MLB appearance
- September 25, 1981, for the Atlanta Braves

MLB statistics
- Win–loss record: 6–4
- Earned run average: 2.52
- Strikeouts: 58
- Stats at Baseball Reference

Teams
- Atlanta Braves (1977, 1979–1981)

Larry Bradford (December 21, 1949 – September 11, 1998) was a pitcher in Major League Baseball. He played for the Atlanta Braves. He died of a heart attack while visiting the Braves team offices at Turner Field at age 48 in 1998.
