= Alan Hargesheimer =

American baseball player (born 1954)

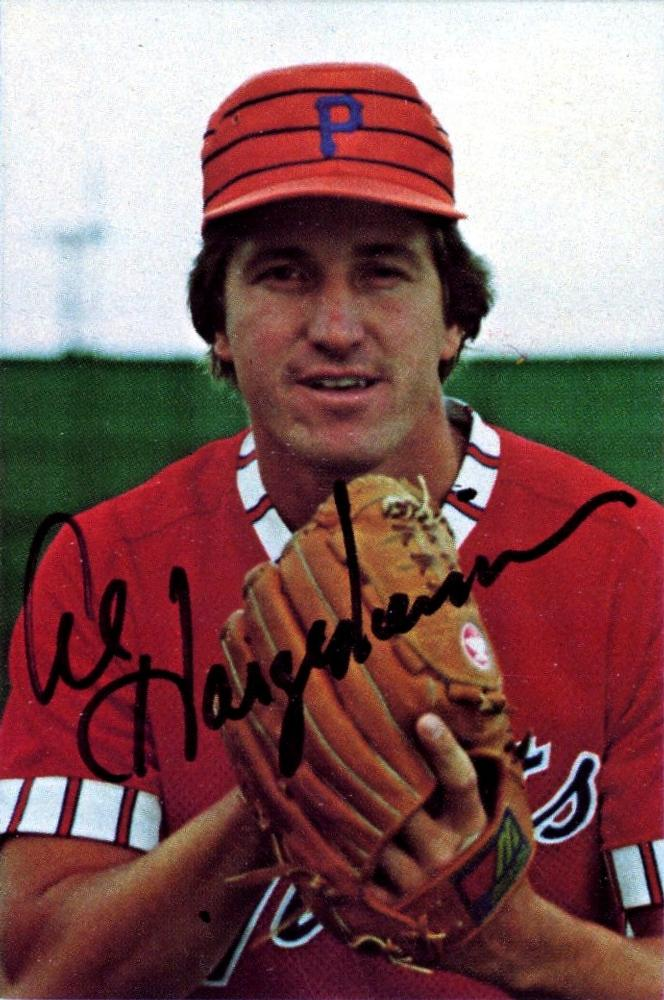
- Pitcher
- Born: November 21, 1954 (age 71); Chicago, Illinois, U.S.
- Batted: Right Threw: Right

MLB debut
- July 14, 1980, for the San Francisco Giants

Last MLB appearance
- August 19, 1986, for the Kansas City Royals

MLB statistics
- Win–loss record: 5–9
- Earned run average: 4.72
- Strikeouts: 55
- Stats at Baseball Reference

Teams
- San Francisco Giants (1980–1981); Chicago Cubs (1983); Kansas City Royals (1986)

Alan Robert Hargesheimer (born November 21, 1954) is an American former Major League Baseball pitcher. He pitched in parts of four seasons between 1980 and 1986 for three different teams. Since his retirement, Hargesheimer has worked as a scout for several teams, including the Detroit Tigers, Colorado Rockies and San Diego Padres. As of 2018, Hargesheimer is the Director of International Scouting for the Nippon-Ham Fighters of the Japanese Pacific League and a professional scout for MLB's Texas Rangers.

Signed by the San Francisco Giants in 1978 as an amateur free agent, Hargesheimer made an impressive Major League debut on July 14, 1980. He was the starting and winning pitcher in a 5-3 victory over the host Cincinnati Reds at Riverfront Stadium, supported by a first-inning Jack Clark home run and by his own run-scoring double in the fourth.

Hargesheimer would have a 4-6 record that season for the Giants, but would get only one MLB victory thereafter. He was traded to the Chicago Cubs in 1983 and appeared in 5 games as a reliever. After his trade to the Kansas City Royals in 1984, injuries limited him to only 5 games in 1986, after which he retired in December of 1988 to pursue a scouting career.

He is a graduate of both Senn High School in Chicago in 1972 and Northeastern Illinois University in 1977.
