= John Montefusco =

American baseball player (born 1950)

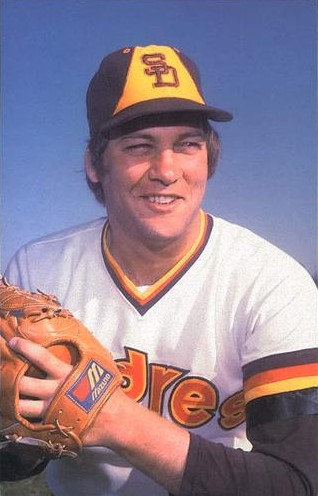
- Pitcher
- Born: May 25, 1950 (age 76); Long Branch, New Jersey, U.S.
- Batted: Right Threw: Right

MLB debut
- September 3, 1974, for the San Francisco Giants

Last MLB appearance
- May 1, 1986, for the New York Yankees

MLB statistics
- Win–loss record: 90–83
- Earned run average: 3.54
- Strikeouts: 1,081
- Stats at Baseball Reference

Teams
- San Francisco Giants (1974–1980); Atlanta Braves (1981); San Diego Padres (1982–1983); New York Yankees (1983–1986)

Career highlights and awards
- All-Star (1976); NL Rookie of the Year (1975); Pitched a no-hitter September 29, 1976; San Francisco Giants Wall of Fame

John Joseph Montefusco Jr. (born May 25, 1950), nicknamed "the Count", is an American former professional baseball player and coach. He played as a right-handed pitcher in Major League Baseball from 1974 to 1986, most notably as a member of the San Francisco Giants with whom he won the National League Rookie of the Year Award and pitched a no-hitter. He also played for the Atlanta Braves, San Diego Padres, and the New York Yankees.

== Early life ==
Montefusco was born in Long Branch, New Jersey, and raised in Keansburg. Montefusco attended Middletown High School in Middletown Township.

== Baseball career ==
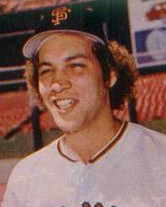
Montefusco with the San Francisco Giants

Named the National League Rookie of the Year in 1975, Montefusco's nickname was "The Count", a pun on his last name which sounds like Monte Cristo. In his 13-year career, his record was 90-83, with 1,081 strikeouts, and a 3.54 ERA. He was a National League All-Star in 1976, winning a career high 16 games that year.

On September 3, 1974, Montefusco entered his first major league game as a relief pitcher. Not only was he the winning pitcher that day, he also hit a home run in his first major-league at-bat. He is one of only a handful of pitchers to do so, and is one of two players to both hit a home run in his first at bat and win the Rookie of the Year Award. The other is Wally Moon.

Before a game against the Los Angeles Dodgers on July 4, 1975, Montefusco guaranteed he would win the game. He proceeded to throw a shutout as the Giants defeated the Dodgers 1–0.

On September 29, 1976, Montefusco threw a no-hitter for the Giants in a 9-0 victory versus the Atlanta Braves. It was the last no-hitter to be thrown by a Giant until Jonathan Sánchez threw one on July 10, 2009.

In June 1980, Montefusco got into a fight with Giants manager Dave Bristol after defeating the rival Los Angeles Dodgers. Montefusco was angry at Bristol for removing him from the game too early.

After the 1983 season, Montefusco signed a three-year, $2.3 million contract to remain with the Yankees. He started the 1986 season in the team's bullpen but pitched in only four games before hip pain became too severe to pitch through. On September 28, he retired.

== Legal problems ==
Montefusco and his wife had been residents of Colts Neck Township, New Jersey. In October 1997, Montefusco was arrested and charged with beating his former wife of 23 years, Doris, whom he had recently divorced, in her Colts Neck Township home. He was held on $60,000 bail and was charged with aggravated sexual assault, making terroristic threats, assault, burglary and criminal mischief. Montefusco was indicted in December 1997 and was held on $1 million in bail.

Montefusco was released on bail in November 1999 after serving more than two years behind bars. In February 2000, he was acquitted of the most serious charges, but found guilty of criminal trespass and simple assault and sentenced to three years of probation.

During a March 19, 2000, broadcast on ESPN's SportsCenter 2000, Doris Montefusco likened her ex-husband to O. J. Simpson, who was acquitted in 1995 of the murder of Nicole Brown Simpson. An ESPN announcer during the broadcast had paraphrased Montefusco's ex-wife as saying "the only difference between this and the O.J. Simpson case is that she's alive to talk about it. Nicole Simpson is not." Montefusco filed a lawsuit against ESPN. In 2001, Anne Elise Thompson, a U.S. district judge in Trenton, New Jersey, dismissed the lawsuit, ruling that being compared to Simpson is not defamation.

== Coaching career ==
At the time of his October 1997 arrest, Montefusco had been a pitching instructor for the Tampa Yankees, a minor league team. He later spent several years as the pitching coach for the Somerset Patriots in the independent Atlantic League of Professional Baseball until resigning in September 2005.

== See also ==
- List of Major League Baseball no-hitters
- List of Major League Baseball players with a home run in their first major league at bat

Awards and achievements
Preceded by John Candelaria	No-hitter pitcher September 29, 1976	Succeeded by Jim Colborn
