= 1980 Houston Astros season =

19th season in Major League Baseball for the Houston Astros

1980 Houston Astros
- National League West champions
- League: National League
- Division: West
- Ballpark: Astrodome
- City: Houston, Texas
- Record: 93–70 (.571)
- Divisional place: 1st
- Owners: John McMullen
- General managers: Tal Smith, Al Rosen
- Managers: Bill Virdon
- Television: KRIV–TV 26 (Gene Elston, Dewayne Staats, Larry Dierker)
- Radio: KPRC–AM 950 (Gene Elston, Dewayne Staats, Larry Dierker)

The 1980 Houston Astros season was the 19th season for the Major League Baseball (MLB) franchise located in Houston, Texas, their 16th as the Astros, 19th in the National League (NL), 12th in the NL West division, and 16th at The Astrodome. The Astros entered the season having completed an 89–73 record for second place and 1 1/2 games behind the division-champion Cincinnati Reds. At the time, this represented the closest the Astros had ever qualified for the playoffs.

On Opening Day, April 10, J. R. Richard made his fifth consecutive Opening Day start for Houston, who hosted the Los Angeles Dodgers and won, 3–2. On July 4, right-hander Nolan Ryan became the fourth major league hurler to record 3,000 career strikeouts.

Richard and left fielder José Cruz were selected to the MLB All-Star Game; Richard was the starting pitcher for the National League, and this was the first career selection for both players.

After a late collapse in 1979, the Astros completed their scheduled regular season with a record of 92–70, tying them for first place with Los Angeles after having lost three in a row in Los Angeles in the final series of the season. To determine the division champion, the teams played a tie-breaker on October 6, which the Astros won for the first division title and first time in franchise history to qualify for the playoffs. At the time, this also set the club record for wins in one season, surpassing the 89 from the season prior. Houston faced the Philadelphia Phillies in the National League Championship Series (NLCS), losing three games to two.

Following the season, The Sporting News recognized general manager Tal Smith as Executive of the Year, and Bill Virdon as Manager of the Year, (Note: From 1938 to 1985, The Sporting News presented one Manager of the Year Award for all of MLB. Starting in 1986, it was presented to one each in both the NL and the American League (AL).) the first Houston Astros personnel to win these awards.

== Offseason ==
- October 12, 1979: Signed pitcher J. R. Richard to a four-year extension.
- October 26, 1979: Keith Drumright was sent by the Astros to the Kansas City Royals as the player to be named later to conclude the exchange started on April 27, 1979, in which the Astros received George Throop from Kansas City.
- November 19, 1979: Nolan Ryan was signed as a free agent by the Astros, for four seasons at $4 million total. Thus, Ryan become baseball's first million-dollar player.
- January 31, 1980: Joe Morgan was signed as a free agent by the Astros. A reunion for the two sides, Morgan made his major league debut with the Colt .45s in 1963 and patrolled second base for them through the 1971 campaign.
- February 21, 1980: Frank Riccelli was released by the Astros.

== Regular season ==
=== Summary ===
==== Opening Day ====
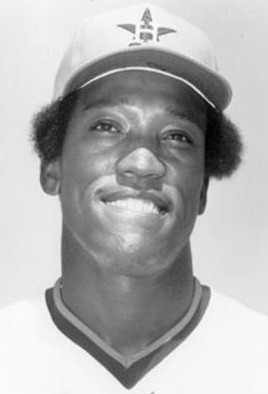
J. R. Richard, first pitcher to start five Opening Days for the Astros

Opening Day starting lineup
Uniform	Player	Position
21	Terry Puhl	Right fielder
12	Craig Reynolds	Shortstop
28	César Cedeño	Center fielder
8	Joe Morgan	Second baseman
25	José Cruz	Left fielder
23	Enos Cabell	Third baseman
18	Art Howe	First baseman
14	Alan Ashby	Catcher
50	J. R. Richard	Pitcher
Venue: Astrodome • Final: Houston 3, Los Angeles 2 Sources:

On April 10, the Astros hosted the Los Angeles Dodgers for Opening Day, with J. R. Richard serving as the starting pitcher for the Astros. Richard carried a personal 11-game winning streak over Los Angeles into the start. Leadoff hitter and the first batter of the season for Houston Terry Puhl cranked a home run in the bottom of the first inning. In the bottom of the second, José Cruz replicated Puhl's feat with a home run leading off, and later that frame, Alan Ashby singled home Art Howe to stake Houston to a 3–0 lead. Cruz' home run was the second of his career on Opening Day, following his blast on April 7, 1975.

Meanwhile, Richard (1–0) started the new campaign in style by assembling a bid for a perfect game as the Dodgers took their at bat for the top of the seventh frame. He struck out Davey Lopes to retire the 19th consecutive batter and first of the seventh. Rookie Rudy Law then stroked a clean single to right field to simultaneously end perfect game and no-hit bids. Richard concluded with eight innings and surrendered just two hits and two runs—one unearned—while inducing 13 whiffs and departed with a 3–2 lead. Joe Sambito relieved and tossed a perfect ninth to preserve the Astros' victory and earn the save.

This Opening Day start extended Richard's then-club record for pitchers to five, which stood until Roy Oswalt took the mound for the 2008 opener. (Note: Prior to Oswalt breaking the record, who amassed eight total, Richard was matched by Mike Scott in 1991 and Shane Reynolds in 2000.) Meanwhile, Enos Cabell, who made the fifth and final of five uninterrupted Opening Day starts at third base for Houston, was just the third such player at the position for the club. Cabell succeeded Bob Aspromonte, who started each of the first seven in club history (1962 to 1968), and Doug Rader, who started each of the following seven (1969 to 1975).

Moreover, the victory represented Houston's eighth on Opening Day in 10 campaigns. This was the best such performance over any 10 season-span in club history, until the Astros reeled off a winning streak of ten Opening Day games from 2013 to 2022.

==== Rest of April ====
Homerless the year prior, on April 11, Craig Reynolds belted his first of the year on an offering from Don Stanhouse leading off the eighth to ignite a five-run rally. This is enough to topple Los Angeles. Making his major league debut, Dave Smith earned the win in relief. During the eighth inning rally, Luis Pujols singled in two runs with the bases loaded, while Enos Cabell scored on the same play via an error, and Art Howe followed by doubling in Pujols.

In his debut as a Houston Astro on April 12, Nolan Ryan slugged a three-run home off Don Sutton of the Dodgers for the first of his major league career. The shot also accounted for half of the runs batted in (RBI) Ryan would accumulate that year. Though the blast gave Houston the lead, it did not hold as the game went all the way to 17 innings before Los Angeles claimed a 6–5 triumph. On the mount, Ryan went 6 innings, yielded 4 runs, 5 walks, and struck out three. Dave Smith (1–1) took the loss when he surrendered the go-ahead single to Mickey Hatcher that scored Dusty Baker during his fourth inning of work.

On April 15, Joe Niekro tossed a six-hit complete game victory over the Atlanta Braves, leading a 6–2 Astros win. His first win of the season, Niekro surrendered no bases on balls while striking out 6.

Richard fired a one-hitter of the Dodgers on April 19 in a 12-strikeout performance, notching his 13th consecutive triumph against the club. The lone hit surrendered to the Dodgers was an infield single by Reggie Smith during the fourth inning, while Richard's game score graded at 94. Bob Welch countered Richard nearly pitch-for-pitch, yielding Houston's only two hits in the fourth as well. However, Terry Puhl and César Cedeño both scored, resulting in the only tallies of the contest and 2–0 Astros win.

Ryan captured his first victory in an Astros uniform on April 22, leading an 8–0 shutout of the Cincinnati Reds at the Astrodome.He surrendered six hits, issued six walks, and whiffed seven over seven frames. Meanwhile, during the bottom of the first inning, José Cruz cranked a bases-loaded triple to opening the scoring—the first of three safeties—while finishing a home run short of hitting for the cycle. This was also Cruz' fifth career bout of five runs batted in (RBI) or more.

Following a stellar month of April, J. R. Richard earned National League (NL) Pitcher of the Month honors. It was also his second consecutive accolade, dating to September at the conclusion of the 1979 season. During five April starts, Richard went 4–0, 1.67 earned run average (ERA), and induced 48 whiffs over 37 2/3 innings pitched (IP). Additionally, he suppressed hitters' success to a .104 batting average against (BAA) while limiting baserunners to a 0.717 walks plus hits per inning pitched (WHIP) and no home runs surrendered.

==== May ====
With a 4–2 win on May 3, Astros manager Bill Virdon earned win number 356 as manager to take over the all-time franchise lead. (Note: This date corresponded to another milestone win for Astros managers, when Dusty Baker reached 2,000 career victory during the 2022 campaign.) The victory over the St. Louis Cardinals allowed Virdon to surpass Harry Walker, who led the club from 1968 to 1972.

Following a near-four hour rain delay on May 6 at Olympic Stadium in Montreal, the Astros left 8–4 winners over the Expos. José Cruz furnished four runs batted in (RBI) to propel the Astros' victory.

On May 18, Ryan hurtled both his first shutout and double-digit strikeout performance as an Astro, while reversing a personal three-game losing streak. Snaring a four-hitter, the Astros triumphed, 3–0, over the Philadelphia Phillies at home. Pete Rose—who knocked three hits—was the only Phillie whom Ryan was unable to solve. All of Houston's scoring took place during the first two frames, courtesy of an RBI from each of the first three batters in the order—Rafael Landestoy, Terry Puhl, and Jeffrey Leonard. Also his first complete game for the new team, Ryan's outing drew a game score of 85.

Enos Cabell singled home José Cruz during the second frame on May 28, and, from there, Nolan Ryan operated in complete command from start to finish, firing a two-hit, 1–0, shutout of the San Diego Padres. Ryan fanned seven and earned a game score of 85. This was Ryan's sixteenth career two-hit complete game, and first since June 18, 1979. (Note: Nolan Ryan, for single games, in complete games, in the regular season, requiring hits allowed = 2, sorted by ascending date.)

==== June—early July ====
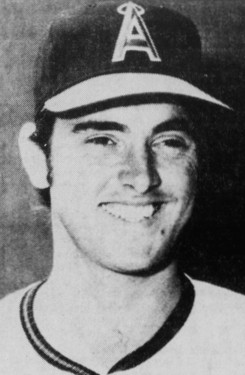
Nolan Ryan, c. 1972, signed a record-breaking deal with the Astros after playing for the Angels.

In a 3–0 shutout of the Chicago Cubs on June 11, Astros starter J. R. Richard extended a scoreless innings streak to 31 2/3. The win capped the first-ever homestand sweep for the Astros after having swept 3 games each in series against the San Francisco Giants and Cubs. Richard's streak broke the franchise record, which stood until September 11, 2008, when Roy Oswalt went to 32 1/3 innings after a 6–0 shutout win over the Pittsburgh Pirates.

Despite battling the flu, on June 16, Nolan Ryan hurled seven one-hit innings before reliever Joe Sambito closed out a 2–0 win over the St. Louis Cardinals. The Cardinals' only hit was a double in the third inning. Offensively, José Cruz plated both of the Astros' runs.

Richard yielded his first two home runs of the season on July 3 to the Atlanta Braves—which would also be the final two served of his career—hence, commencing the season without having surrendered any over the first 110 innings. Dale Murphy and Chris Chambliss took Richard deep back-to-back with two outs in the bottom of the sixth inning, for the first since Ray Knight on September 21, 1979. (Note: Between Knight's and Murphy's blasts, Richard tossed 135 1/3 consecutive innings without having served a home run.) The Astros won, 5–3, and Richard obtained his 10th victory of the season, which would be the concluding of his career as well.

==== Nolan Ryan's 3,000th strikeout ====
At Riverfront Stadium on July 4, Ryan became the fourth pitcher in major league history to record 3,000 strikeouts, joining Walter Johnson, Gaylord Perry, and Bob Gibson. During the bottom of the second inning, César Gerónimo of the Cincinnati Reds whiffed on a high inside fastball for the right-hander's historic marker. (Note: Gerónimo was also Gibson's 3,000th strikeout casualty on July 17, 1974.) However, Cincinnati prevailed, 8–1. Over four innings, Ryan fanned six but walked seven.

Gerónimo was Ryan's third victim of the evening. In the first inning, Ken Griffey Sr. and Dan Driessen whiffed. In the second, Ray Knight worked a base on balls to turn over to Gerónimo. The center fielder fouled off an offering, took a ball, took a strike, then was retired swinging. The game momentarily paused as catcher Alan Ashby presented the ball to Ryan while 37,047 onlookers acknowledged the accomplishment with a standing ovation.

Ryan concluded the outing with 3,003 strikeouts, but with 1,173 bases on balls. His 13-year career record stood at 172–165.

==== MLB All-Star Game ====
J. R. Richard was named the starting pitcher for the National League at the 51st All-Star Game, hosted at Dodger Stadium. There, Richard owned a career 7–2 record, and, on the season going into the break, had produced a 10–4 record, 1.96 ERA and 115 punchouts in 110 1/3 frames. Richard became the Astros' first-ever pitcher to start an All-Star Game. He proceeded to toss two scoreless innings, fanned three hitters while navigating nine total batters faced. He also surrendered one hit and issued two bases on balls.

Cruz was also an All-Star selectee but did not enter the contest. The NL squad prevailed, 4–2.

==== Rest of July—August ====
Richard made what turned out to be his final major league appearance on July 14 at the Astrodome, hosting the Braves. He departed during the top of the fourth inning having surrendered just 1 hit to a scoreless tie. Richard doubled off Phil Niekro his final plate appearance leading off the bottom of the third, but Niekro came back to strike out the side, retiring Landestoy, Leonard and Cruz. During the top of the fourth, Richard issued a walk to Dale Murphy, who was leading off, then induced Chris Chambliss to hit into a groundball force out. Chambliss would be Richard's final major league batter faced. Gordie Pladson relieved and proceeded to toss 3 2/3 innings. The Braves scored first, when Bruce Benedict doubled in Jeff Burroughs in the top of the fifth off Pladson. In the seventh, Bob Horner took Pladson deep. The Astros could not muster any offense, however, dropping the contest, 2–0.

Joe Niekro went 3-for-3 while batting on July 27 to lead a 6–3 triumph over the Montreal Expos and pick up his 11th victory of the season. Niekro pitched 5 solid innings, with two runs allowed, while Dave Smith picked up with the final four frames with just one unearned allowed to convert his fifth save. Rafael Landestoy tripled, got a stolen base and scored a run to lead the offense.

While working out at the Astrodome on July 30, J. R. Richard collapsed from stroke. Rushed to Houston Methodist Hospital, surgical intervention saved his life. His distracted teammates dropped the contest, 6–4, later that day to the Phillies. Following recovery, Richard would never regain the coordination required to resume his playing career. In the midst of his finest campaign at the time of the accident, Richard was leading the league in each of wins, earned run average, strikeouts and shutouts.

Richard, who at that point had realized full control over his arsenal, had finished the 1979 campaign as the league leader with fewest hits per nine innings surrendered (6.8 H/9) and highest strikeout-to-walk ratio (3.19 K/BB). Spanning one full calendar year over 31 games started dating to the previous July 26, he had commenced an uniquely dominant period, not seen in club history: 20–6 W–L, 1.50 ERA, 234 2/3 innings, 15 complete games, 7 shutouts, 258 strikeouts, 48 runs, 133 hits, 4 home runs, 78 BB, and 0.899 walks plus hits per inning pitched (WHIP) versus 902 batters faced. (Note: In a span of 31 games, from 1979-07-26 to 1980-07-30, in the regular season, sorted by descending Strikeouts.)

With the contest on August 23 so far having gone scoreless, Joe Niekro entered and took the mound in the 16th inning versus the Chicago Cubs. In the bottom of the 17th, an intentional base on balls to José Cruz loaded the bases. With two out, Niekro batted and singled in Enos Cabell for the walk-off, 1–0 triumph, while spotting himself his own victory to boost his record to 13–11.

For the week of August 18 to 24, Joe Sambito tossed 8 2/3 shutout innings pitched, yielding two hits and no walks for a .095 batting average against, and struck out seven over three relief appearances. The last of the three included four one-hit frames in extra innings against the Cubs in the 17-inning shutout on August 23. Hence, Sambito was recognized with the NL Player of the Week Award.

On August 26, César Cedeño walloped the first grand slam by the Houston Astros in nearly three years since Bob Watson did so September 4, 1977, and his first since June 11, 1974. It was a 2-all tiebreaking shot off Jim Kaat of St, Louis during the top of the fifth inning. Houston stayed in control after that, with Joe Niekro (14–11) going the distance, scattering seven hits in a 7–2 final. José Cruz collected three hits and an RBI, and Terry Puhl doubled (17) and purloined a base (20).

==== September—October ====
On September 6, Art Howe's eighth consecutive hit, a two-run single, matched the club record and paced a 9–5 triumph over St. Louis during the first game of a doubleheader. Pitcher Joe Niekro chipped in two hits with a double. In the nightcap, José Cruz blasted a grand slam, the first of his career, and ninth home run of the season. Cruz' blast, off John Martin in third inning, ignited the crucial margin for victory in a 6-4 final for the twinbill sweep which drew the Astros to within one game of the NL West-leading Dodgers. Vern Ruhle, who went the distance for the second game, continued his emergence as a clutch performer in place of J. R. Richard after his stroke to fuel the Astros in the pennant race.

Cruz blasted an extra innings, walk-off home run on September 10 off Rick Sutcliffe to cap a furious 6–5 final over Los Angeles, pulling the two clubs into a tie for first place in the NL West. The drive redeemed two previous Astros runners who were cut down attempting to score, while Cruz had stoked two rallies in regulation to bring the contest to a 3–3 tie. César Cedeño clustered four hits; The fourth walk-off blast of Cruz' career, (Note: José Cruz: 6 home runs in 1972–1988—walk-off) he went 3-for-6 and scored thrice. Nolan Ryan worked the first eight innings for Houston and struck out nine.

Joe Morgan stung his former club on September 18 with a tie-breaking two-run home run, punctuating a 10–2 beatdown of Cincinnati. José Cruz also homered off Charlie Liebrandt in the ninth as the Astros ran away with it to highlight a five-run frame. Ken Forsch (12–12) earned the win while Joe Sambito polished off three scoreless frames to sum his 16th save.

On September 21, Vern Ruhle heaved 7 2/3 innings pitched of a no-hit bid to grasp a 5–1 win in San Francisco while reclaiming the division lead from the Dodgers. Jim Wohlford desisted the bid but Ruhle (10–4) could not be halted from polishing off a complete game three-hitter to outduel Vida Blue, and post a game score of 81. Art Howe homered and Gary Woods drove in two for Houston.

Ruhle tossed a crucial four-hit, 2–0 shutout of Cincinnati on September 26 to move Houston to two games ahead of the Dodgers for the division lead. The following day, Niekro teamed with Dave Smith to author yet another 2–0 victory of Cincinnati. A four-hitter, Niekro improved to 18–12 while Smith hurled the final four outs, including three strikeouts, for his ninth save. Craig Reynolds delivered a 2-RBI double in bottom of fifth for the contest's only tallies. With seven games remaining, it was Houston's 89th victory of the season, equaling the prior year's edition for most in franchise history.

On October 1, Ruhle shot his third consecutive complete game to up his record to 12–4 as Terry Puhl stroked a bases-loaded double to key a 5–2 triumph over Atlanta. Ruhle outdueled Phil Niekro (15–17), who surrendered four runs on seven hits in seven innings. Following a 3–2 victory over the Braves on October 2, the Astros built one of the largest divisional leads that they would hold all season, going up three games on second-place Los Angeles prior to venturing to Dodger Stadium with three games remaining in the season.

The antepenultimate contest on October 3 featured a taut pitchers' duel between the Astros' Ken Forsch and the Dodgers' Don Sutton. Forsch pitched the entire nine innings of a 2–2 tie, including yielding the game-tying run in the bottom of the ninth. Forsch remained on the mound in the bottom of the tenth, but was greeted by catcher Joe Ferguson's walk-off home run, handing Forsch and the Astros a stunning 3–2 defeat. The home run was Ferguson's third walk-off of the campaign. (Note: Ferguson had belted his most recent walk-off home run against Forsch's brother, Bob, on August 1, 1980.) The Dodgers won the second game as well. During the regular season finale, Houston mounted a 3–0 advantage through four innings. Los Angeles answered by scoring once each in the bottom of the fifth and seventh innings. In the bottom of the eighth, Ron Cey connected off Frank LaCorte for a two-run home run that scored Steve Garvey and gave the Dodgers a 4–3 lead. This lead stood as the final score, capping a Dodgers' sweep of the final series.

At the conclusion of the regular season, the Astros and Dodgers had tied for first place in the NL West with identical 92–70 records. Hence, a tie-breaker was scheduled for October 6, also held at Dodger Stadium, as an addendum to the regular season to determine the NL West division winner and club which would qualify for the playoffs.

==== NL West tie-breaker game ====
To secure their first-ever playoff entrance, the Astros commissioned Joe Niekro as starting pitcher for the tie-breaker game on October 6. This additional regular season contest ceded Niekro another opportunity at a personal milestone, as he had concluded the original 162-game gamut with 19 victories. Niekro delivered, leading the Astros to a 7–1 triumph via a complete game six-hitter, while unlocking his 20th win. First baseman Art Howe led the offense, connected for his 10th home run among three hits while activating four runs batted in (RBI). Craig Reynolds also collected three hits as the Astros mashed 12 hits total.

Hence, the Astros finally claimed both their first division title and first playoff berth. However, Astros catcher Alan Ashby sustained a rib fracture in a violent collision at home plate during the fourth inning with the knee of his counterpart Joe Ferguson. The injury forced Ashby to miss any remaining action for the season, including the National League Championship Series (NLCS).

==== Performance overview ====
The wait was over: during their 19th season in 1980 the Astros qualified for the first-ever playoff tournament in franchise history. Presaged by their greatest run to date the season prior in 1979, they mounted a then-franchise record 89 wins hallmarked by remarkable achievement by their pitching both collectively and individually, just falling short with a second-place finish. During the 1980 season, though the Astros had spent more days in first place than ever, they never led by more than 3 1/2 games as the Los Angeles Dodgers continually matched the Astros win-for-win with the two clubs swapping and maintaining first and second place at various junctures throughout the season.

With their 93rd regular-season victory, the Astros established yet another then-club record for wins, having just superseded that achievement the season prior. This record held for just six seasons, until another playoff charge in 1986.

As a team, the Astros golfed 67 triples, usurping the club record of 60 set in 1977. (Note: The 1984 edition later tied this record.) This Astros team also formerly held the stolen base record with 194, having surpassed the record of 190 set just the year before, until 1988.

After going 21–11 in 1979, Joe Niekro followed up with a 20–12 record to became the first Houston Astro to produce back-to-back 20 game-winning seasons. Niekro augmented his performance at the plate by batting .275 (22-for-80), with 5 doubles, 10 RBI, 4 bases on balls and 18 sacrifice hits, the latter of which ranked second in the league.

Nolan Ryan led the major leagues in walks (98) to extend his major-league record to a seventh season, and for the first time as a National Leaguer. As a member of the California Angels, Ryan had already broken the American League record with six, from 1972–1974, and 1976–1978.

Reliever Dave Smith established a then-Astros' rookie record by converting 10 saves, surpassing six each by Jim Crawford (1968) and Steve Shea (1973). (Note: Record was broken by Bill Dawley, who converted 14 saves in 1983.)

Left fielder José Cruz was recognized with the Houston Astros' team Most Valuable Player Award (MVP), the second time receiving this honor since his performance during the 1977 campaign. Cruz became the second repeat winner, joining Rusty Staub in 1966 and 1967.

=== League standings ===
==== National League West ====
NL West
Team	W	L	Pct.	GB	Home	Road
Houston Astros	93	70	.571	—	55‍–‍26	38‍–‍44
Los Angeles Dodgers	92	71	.564	1	55‍–‍27	37‍–‍44
Cincinnati Reds	89	73	.549	3½	44‍–‍37	45‍–‍36
Atlanta Braves	81	80	.503	11	50‍–‍30	31‍–‍50
San Francisco Giants	75	86	.466	17	44‍–‍37	31‍–‍49
San Diego Padres	73	89	.451	19½	45‍–‍36	28‍–‍53

==== Record versus opponents ====
National League

1980 National League record Sources:
Team	ATL	CHC	CIN	HOU	LAD	MON	NYM	PHI	PIT	SD	SF	STL
Atlanta	—	8–4	2–16	7–11	11–7	5–7	3–9	5–7	11–1	12–6	11–6	6–6
Chicago	4–8	—	7–5	1–11	5–7	6–12	10–8	5–13	8–10	4–8	5–7	9–9
Cincinnati	16–2	5–7	—	8–10	9–9	3–9	8–4	7–5	6–6	15–3–1	7–11	5–7
Houston	11–7	11–1	10–8	—	9–10	5–7	8–4	3–9	7–5	11–7	11–7	7–5
Los Angeles	7–11	7–5	9–9	10–9	—	11–1	7–5	6–6	6–6	9–9	13–5	7–5
Montreal	7–5	12–6	9–3	7–5	1–11	—	10–8	9–9	6–12	10–2	7–5	12–6
New York	9–3	8–10	4–8	4–8	5–7	8–10	—	6–12	10–8	1–11	3–9	9–9
Philadelphia	7–5	13–5	5–7	9–3	6–6	9–9	12–6	—	7–11	8–4	6–6	9–9
Pittsburgh	1–11	10–8	6–6	5–7	6–6	12–6	8–10	11–7	—	6–6	8–4	10–8
San Diego	6–12	8–4	3–15–1	7–11	9–9	2–10	11–1	4–8	6–6	—	10–8	7–5
San Francisco	6–11	7–5	11–7	7–11	5–13	5–7	9–3	6–6	4–8	8–10	—	7–5
St. Louis	6–6	9–9	7–5	5–7	5–7	6–12	9–9	9–9	8–10	5–7	5–7	—

=== Roster ===
1980 Houston Astros
Roster
Pitchers: 47 Joaquín Andújar; 43 Ken Forsch; 31 Frank LaCorte; 36 Joe Niekro; 46 Randy Niemann; 26 Gordie Pladson; 50 J. R. Richard; 42 Bert Roberge; 48 Vern Ruhle; 34 Nolan Ryan; 35 Joe Sambito; 45 Dave Smith; 41 Bobby Sprowl	Catchers: 14 Alan Ashby; 13 Bruce Bochy; 6 Luis Pujols; Infielders: 16 Dave Bergman; 23 Enos Cabell; 10 Mike Fischlin; 9 Julio González; 20 Danny Heep; 18 Art Howe; 17 Rafael Landestoy; 8 Joe Morgan; 12 Craig Reynolds; 29 Denny Walling	Outfielders: 28 César Cedeño; 25 José Cruz; 30 Jeffrey Leonard; 22 Scott Loucks; 21 Terry Puhl; 15 Gary Woods; Other batters: 11 Alan Knicely	Manager: 7 Bill Virdon; Coaches: 4 Deacon Jones; 3 Don Leppert; 5 Bob Lillis; 2 Mel Wright

== Game log ==
=== Regular season ===
Legend
	Astros win
	Astros loss
	Postponement
	Clinched division
**Bold**	Astros team member

1980 regular season game log: 93–70 (Home: 55–26; Away: 38–44)
April: 13–5 (Home: 9–3; Away: 4–2)

#	Date	Time (CT)	Opponent	Score	Win	Loss	Save	Time of Game	Attendance	Record	Box/ Streak
1	April 10	7:35 p.m. CST	Dodgers	**W** 3–2	**Richard** (1–0)	Hooton (0–1)	**Sambito** (1)	2:03	33,270	1–0	W1
2	April 11	7:35 p.m. CST	Dodgers	**W** 10–6	**Smith** (1–0)	Stanhouse (0–1)	–	2:58	30,701	2–0	W2
3	April 12	3:15 p.m. CST	Dodgers	L 5–6 (17)	Howe (1–0)	**Smith** (1–1)	Hooton (1)	5:35	24,609	2–1	L1
4	April 13	2:05 p.m. CST	Dodgers	**W** 4–2	**Forsch** (1–0)	Goltz (0–1)	**LaCorte** (1)	2:19	33,676	3–1	W1
5	April 14	7:35 p.m. CST	Braves	**W** 5–4	**Sambito** (1–0)	Garber (0–1)	–	3:15	15,017	4–1	W2
6	April 15	7:35 p.m. CST	Braves	**W** 6–2	**Niekro** (1–0)	McWilliams (0–2)	–	2:14	15,712	5–1	W3
7	April 17	3:00 p.m. CST	@ Dodgers	L 4–6	Reuss (1–0)	**Smith** (1–2)	–	3:06	45,476	5–2	L1
8	April 18	9:30 p.m. CST	@ Dodgers	**W** 7–4	**Forsch** (2–0)	Goltz (0–2)	**Andújar** (1)	3:20	41,112	6–2	W1
9	April 19	9:00 p.m. CST	@ Dodgers	**W** 2–0	**Richard** (2–0)	Welch (0–1)	–	2:40	50,112	7–2	W2
10	April 20	3:00 p.m. CST	@ Dodgers	L 2–4	Reuss (2–0)	**Niekro** (1–1)	–	2:27	39,442	7–3	L1
11	April 21	7:35 p.m. CST	Reds	L 5–6	LaCoss (3–0)	**Ruhle** (0–1)	Hume (3)	3:09	29,067	7–4	L2
12	April 22	7:35 p.m. CST	Reds	**W** 8–0	**Ryan** (1–0)	Pastore (2–1)	–	2:45	30,094	8–4	W1
13	April 23	7:35 p.m. CST	Reds	L 2–3 (12)	Hume (2–0)	**Andújar** (0–1)	Bair (1)	3:39	29,828	8–5	L1
14	April 25	7:35 p.m. CST	Mets	**W** 7–4	**Richard** (3–0)	Falcone (1–1)	–	2:52	24,140	9–5	W1
15	April 26	7:35 p.m. CST	Mets	**W** 6–0	**Niekro** (2–1)	Glynn (0–1)	**LaCorte** (2)	2:42	44,540	10–5	W2
16	April 27	2:05 p.m. CDT	Mets	**W** 4–3 (12)	**LaCorte** (1–0)	Allen (0–3)	–	3:37	20,828	11–5	W3
17	April 29	7:05 p.m. CDT	@ Reds	**W** 3–0	**Forsch** (3–0)	Leibrandt (1–2)	–	2:14	18,092	12–5	W4
18	April 30	7:05 p.m. CDT	@ Reds	**W** 5–1	**Richard** (4–0)	Seaver (1–1)	–	2:21	19,821	13–5	W5

May: 12–14 (Home: 4–4; Away: 8–10)

#	Date	Time (CT)	Opponent	Score	Win	Loss	Save	Time of Game	Attendance	Record	Box/ Streak
19	May 1	7:05 p.m. CDT	@ Reds	**W** 9–3	**Niekro** (3–1)	LaCoss (3–2)	–	3:00	18,215	14–5	W6
20	May 2	7:38 p.m. CDT	@ Cardinals	L 1–9	Hood (1–1)	**Ryan** (1–1)	Kaat (1)	2:39	23,009	14–6	L1
21	May 3	7:10 p.m. CDT	@ Cardinals	**W** 4–2	**Ruhle** (1–1)	Martínez (1–2)	**Sambito** (2)	2:10	23,292	15–6	W1
22	May 4	1:19 p.m. CDT	@ Cardinals	**W** 4–2	**Forsch** (4–0)	Sykes (1–3)	**LaCorte** (3)	2:37	17,262	16–6	W2
23	May 5	12:35 p.m. CDT	@ Expos	L 1–10	Palmer (1–0)	**Richard** (4–1)	–	2:41	5,477	16–7	L1
24	May 6	12:35 p.m. CDT	@ Expos	**W** 8–4	**Niekro** (4–1)	Grimsley (1–2)	–	2:33	5,503	17–7	W1
25	May 7	12:35 p.m. CDT	@ Expos	L 0–3	Sanderson (2–2)	**Ryan** (1–2)	Fryman (3)	2:29	7,386	17–8	L1
26	May 9	6:35 p.m. CDT	@ Braves	L 4–5	McWilliams (2–2)	**Forsch** (4–1)	Bradford (1)	2:21	11,111	17–9	L2
27	May 10	6:35 p.m. CDT	@ Braves	**W** 3–2 (11)	**LaCorte** (2–0)	Garber (1–2)	**Sambito** (3)	3:15	13,798	18–9	W1
28	May 11	1:15 p.m. CDT	@ Braves	L 4–7	Niekro (2–4)	**Niekro** (4–2)	–	2:25	10,871	18–10	L1
29	May 13	7:35 p.m. CDT	Expos	L 2–3	Palmer (2–0)	**Ryan** (1–3)	–	2:42	24,835	18–11	L2
30	May 14	7:35 p.m. CDT	Expos	L 0–1	Sanderson (3–2)	**Forsch** (4–2)	Fryman (5)	2:19	20,636	18–12	L3
31	May 16	7:35 p.m. CDT	Phillies	L 0–3	Ruthven (4–2)	**Richard** (4–2)	—	2:06	33,610	18–13	L4
32	May 17	7:35 p.m. CDT	Phillies	L 2–4	Christenson (3–0)	**Niekro** (4–3)	Noles (3)	2:25	43,525	18–14	L5
33	May 18	2:05 p.m. CDT	Phillies	**W** 3–0	**Ryan** (2–3)	Lerch (2–3)	—	2:07	33,950	19–14	W1
34	May 20	7:05 p.m. CDT	@ Mets	**W** 3–2	**Forsch** (5–2)	Swan (2–3)	–	2:29	8,466	20–14	W2
35	May 21	7:05 p.m. CDT	@ Mets	L 1–5	Falcone (3–2)	**Richard** (4–3)	Allen (7)	2:37	4,233	20–15	L1
36	May 22	7:05 p.m. CDT	@ Mets	**W** 8–5	**Niekro** (5–3)	Kobel (0–4)	**LaCorte** (4)	2:55	7,812	21–15	W1
37	May 23	7:05 p.m. CDT	@ Phillies	L 0–3	Carlton (8–2)	**Ryan** (2–4)	—	2:11	27,822	21–16	L1
38	May 24	6:05 p.m. CDT	@ Phillies	L 4–5	Saucier (2–3)	**Andújar** (0–2)	McGraw (3)	2:28	28,539	21–17	L2
39	May 25	12:35 p.m. CDT	@ Phillies	L 2–6	Ruthven (5–3)	**Forsch** (5–3)	—	2:10	37,340	21–18	L3
40	May 26	7:35 p.m. CDT	Padres	**W** 4–1	**Richard** (5–3)	Curtis (3–4)	**Sambito** (4)	2:59	18,242	22–18	W1
41	May 27	7:35 p.m. CDT	Padres	**W** 4–3	**LaCorte** (3–0)	Fingers (5–5)	–	2:47	18,246	23–18	W2
42	May 28	7:35 p.m. CDT	Padres	**W** 1–0	**Ryan** (3–4)	Wise (2–3)	–	2:30	19,697	24–18	W3
43	May 30	9:38 p.m. CDT	@ Giants	L 2–3	Blue (8–2)	**Forsch** (5–4)	–	2:19	10,511	24–19	L1
44	May 31	3:09 p.m. CDT	@ Giants	**W** 5–0	**Richard** (6–3)	Montefusco (2–4)	–	2:15	11,649	25–19	W1

June: 18–9 (Home: 13–4; Away: 5–5)

#	Date	Time (CT)	Opponent	Score	Win	Loss	Save	Time of Game	Attendance	Record	Box/ Streak
45	June 1	3:09 p.m. CDT	@ Giants	L 2–6	Knepper (4–6)	**Niekro** (5–4)	–	2:35	19,801	25–20	L1
46	June 2	9:00 p.m. CDT	@ Padres	L 0–3	Wise (3–3)	**Ryan** (3–5)	Rasmussen (1)	2:16	27,176	25–21	L2
47	June 3	9:00 p.m. CDT	@ Padres	**W** 3–2	**Ruhle** (2–1)	Jones (4–4)	**LaCorte** (5)	2:20	12,363	26–21	W1
48	June 4	9:00 p.m. CDT	@ Padres	**W** 4–3	**Forsch** (6–4)	Fingers (5–6)	**Sambito** (5)	2:27	13,619	27–21	W2
49	June 6	7:35 p.m. CDT	Giants	**W** 2–0	**Richard** (7–3)	Knepper (4–7)	–	2:02	26,822	28–21	W3
50	June 7	7:35 p.m. CDT	Giants	**W** 3–0	**Niekro** (6–4)	Whitson (2–7)	–	2:05	42,263	29–21	W4
51	June 8	7:35 p.m. CDT	Giants	**W** 5–4	**Sambito** (2–0)	Minton (2–3)	–	2:30	28,327	30–21	W5
52	June 9	7:35 p.m. CDT	Cubs	**W** 6–2	**Forsch** (7–4)	Lamp (6–2)	–	2:31	19,022	31–21	W6
53	June 10	7:35 p.m. CDT	Cubs	**W** 5–2	**Ruhle** (3–1)	Krukow (3–7)	–	2:22	21,201	32–21	W7
54	June 11	7:35 p.m. CDT	Cubs	**W** 3–0	**Richard** (8–3)	Reuschel (5–6)	–	2:18	31,599	33–21	W8
–	June 12		Cubs	**Postponed (Schedule change)** (Makeup date: June 9)							
55	June 13	6:35 p.m. CDT	@ Pirates	L 3–5	Solomon (4–0)	**Niekro** (6–5)	Tekulve (9)	2:35	31,854	33–22	L1
56	June 14	6:05 p.m. CDT	@ Pirates	**W** 7–3	**Ryan** (4–5)	Robinson (2–2)	**LaCorte** (6)	3:08	33,922	34–22	W1
57	June 15	12:35 p.m. CDT	@ Pirates	L 1–4	Candelaria (4–5)	**Forsch** (7–5)	–	2:08	49,541	34–23	L1
58	June 16	1:30 p.m. CDT	@ Cubs	**W** 2–1	**Ruhle** (4–1)	Hernández (1–5)	**Smith** (1)	2:35	15,289	35–23	W1
59	June 17	1:30 p.m. CDT	@ Cubs	**W** 7–1	**Richard** (9–3)	McGlothen (3–4)	**Andújar** (2)	2:54	19,480	36–23	W2
60	June 18	7:35 p.m. CDT	Cardinals	**W** 3–0	**Niekro** (7–5)	Kaat (1–4)	–	2:08	24,459	37–23	W3
61	June 19	7:35 p.m. CDT	Cardinals	**W** 2–0	**Ryan** (5–5)	Sykes (1–6)	**Sambito** (6)	2:02	24,663	38–23	W4
62	June 20	7:35 p.m. CDT	Pirates	**W** 6–4	**Forsch** (8–5)	Candelaria (4–6)	**Sambito** (7)	2:14	35,955	39–23	W5
63	June 21	7:35 p.m. CDT	Pirates	**W** 4–2	**Ruhle** (5–1)	Blyleven (2–7)	**Sambito** (8)	2:30	45,867	40–23	W6
64	June 22	7:35 p.m. CDT	Pirates	L 1–2	Bibby (8–1)	**Niekro** (7–6)	Jackson (3)	2:33	46,213	40–24	L1
65	June 23	7:35 p.m. CDT	Dodgers	L 0–3	Sutcliffe (2–4)	**Andújar** (0–3)	–	2:29	29,753	40–25	L2
66	June 24	7:35 p.m. CDT	Dodgers	**W** 5–4 (12)	**LaCorte** (4–0)	Beckwith (3–1)	–	4:13	34,388	41–25	W1
67	June 25	7:35 p.m. CDT	Dodgers	L 2–9	Welch (8–2)	**Forsch** (8–6)	–	2:50	34,416	41–26	L1
68	June 27	7:35 p.m. CDT	Reds	**W** 5–4	**Niekro** (8–6)	Pastore (9–4)	**Sambito** (9)	2:31	36,648	42–26	W1
69	June 28	7:35 p.m. CDT	Reds	L 5–8	Price (1–0)	**Richard** (9–4)	Hume (11)	3:08	44,025	42–27	L1
70	June 29	5:00 p.m. CDT	Reds	**W** 12–10	**LaCorte** (5–0)	Soto (0–3)	**Sambito** (10)	3:20	38,408	43–27	W1
71	June 30	6:35 p.m. CDT	@ Braves	L 4–5 (11)	Hrabosky (4–1)	**Sambito** (2–1)	–	2:53	8,208	43–28	L1

July: 13–16 (Home: 8–6; Away: 5–10)

#	Date	Time (CT)	Opponent	Score	Win	Loss	Save	Time of Game	Attendance	Record	Box/ Streak
72	July 1	6:35 p.m. CDT	@ Braves	L 4–13	Alexander (6–3)	**Niekro** (8–7)	–	2:47	9,546	43–29	L2
73	July 2	6:35 p.m. CDT	@ Braves	L 0–14	Niekro (6–10)	**Ruhle** (5–2)	–	2:27	21,908	43–30	L3
74	July 3	6:35 p.m. CDT	@ Braves	**W** 4–3	**Richard** (10–4)	Boggs (3–4)	**LaCorte** (7)	2:44	15,769	44–30	W1
75	July 4	7:05 p.m. CDT	@ Reds	L 1–8	Leibrandt (8–4)	**Ryan** (5–6)	–	2:42	37,047	44–31	L1
76	July 5 (1)	4:37 p.m. CDT	@ Reds	L 6–8	Soto (1–3)	**Forsch** (8–7)	–	2:46	N/A	44–32	L2
77	July 5 (2)	7:58 p.m. CDT	@ Reds	L 2–3	LaCoss (5–7)	**Andújar** (0–4)	Hume (12)	2:34	44,083	44–33	L3
78	July 6	1:15 p.m. CDT	@ Reds	**W** 3–2	**Niekro** (9–7)	Pastore (10–5)	**LaCorte** (8)	2:37	30,045	45–33	W1
—	July 8	7:40 p.m. CDT	**51st All-Star Game in Los Angeles, CA**								
79	July 10	9:30 p.m. CDT	@ Dodgers	L 3–4	Howe (3–4)	**Ryan** (5–7)	–	2:52	49,692	45–34	L1
80	July 11	7:10 p.m. CDT	@ Dodgers	L 2–3	Reuss (10–2)	**Forsch** (8–8)	Howe (8)	2:30	42,754	45–35	L2
81	July 12	7:35 p.m. CDT	Braves	**W** 9–5	**Niekro** (10–8)	McWilliams (5–6)	**Smith** (2)	2:54	38,610	46–35	W1
82	July 13 (1)	5:35 p.m. CDT	Braves	**W** 6–5	**Sambito** (3–1)	Garber (2–5)	**LaCorte** (9)	2:48	N/A	47–35	W2
83	July 13 (2)	8:58 p.m. CDT	Braves	**W** 6–1	**Ruhle** (6–2)	Boggs (3–5)	–	2:28	31,230	48–35	W3
84	July 14	7:35 p.m. CDT	Braves	L 0–2	Niekro (7–11)	**Pladson** (0–1)	–	2:19	20,247	48–36	L1
85	July 15	7:35 p.m. CDT	Phillies	**W** 3–2	**Sambito** (4–1)	Ruthven (8–6)	—	2:08	24,223	49–36	W1
86	July 16	7:35 p.m. CDT	Phillies	L 2–4	Walk (6–0)	**Forsch** (8–9)	—	2:06	28,532	49–37	L1
87	July 17	7:35 p.m. CDT	Phillies	L 1–2	Carlton (15–4)	**Niekro** (10–8)	—	2:18	26,403	49–38	L2
88	July 18	7:35 p.m. CDT	Expos	L 4–5 (11)	Fryman (4–4)	**Smith** (1–3)	Norman (4)	3:24	26,389	49–39	L3
89	July 19 (1)	5:35 p.m. CDT	Expos	**W** 4–2	**Andújar** (1–4)	Lea (2–4)	**Smith** (3)	2:44	40,499	50–39	W1
90	July 19 (2)	8:54 p.m. CDT	Expos	L 2–5	Gullickson (1–2)	**Pladson** (0–2)	–	2:35	39,507	50–40	L1
91	July 20	7:35 p.m. CDT	Expos	**W** 4–3	**Sambito** (5–1)	Norman (0–1)	–	2:16	28,513	51–40	W1
92	July 21	7:35 p.m. CDT	Mets	**W** 3–2	**LaCorte** (6–1)	Allen (4–6)	–	2:23	20,548	52–40	W2
93	July 22	7:35 p.m. CDT	Mets	**W** 6–5	**Roberge** (1–0)	Glynn (3–3)	**Smith** (4)	3:02	26,815	53–40	W3
94	July 23	7:35 p.m. CDT	Mets	L 3–4	Reardon (5–5)	**LaCorte** (6–1)	Allen (16)	2:44	30,236	53–41	L1
95	July 25	6:35 p.m. CDT	@ Expos	**W** 9–8	**LaCorte** (7–1)	Sosa (5–4)	–	3:31	50,217	54–41	W1
96	July 26	6:35 p.m. CDT	@ Expos	L 1–2 (12)	Sahnsen (7–4)	**LaCorte** (7–2)	–	3:46	42,400	54–42	L1
97	July 27	12:35 p.m. CDT	@ Expos	**W** 6–3	**Niekro** (11–8)	Lee (3–5)	**Smith** (5)	3:02	41,107	55–42	W1
98	July 28	6:35 p.m. CDT	@ Phillies	**W** 3–2 (10)	**Sambito** (6–1)	Reed (6–4)	—	2:41	30,181	56–42	W2
99	July 29	6:35 p.m. CDT	@ Phillies	L 6–9	Saucier (5–3)	**LaCorte** (7–3)	McGraw (8)	3:05	30,252	56–43	L1
100	July 30	6:35 p.m. CDT	@ Phillies	L 4–6	Ruthven (10–7)	**Ryan** (5–8)	McGraw (9)	2:36	31,342	56–44	L2

August: 18–12 (Home: 9–4; Away: 9–8)

#	Date	Time (CT)	Opponent	Score	Win	Loss	Save	Time of Game	Attendance	Record	Box/ Streak
101	August 1	7:05 p.m. CDT	@ Mets	L 4–5	Reardon (6–5)	**Smith** (1–4)	–	2:42	16,612	56–45	L3
102	August 2	6:05 p.m. CDT	@ Mets	L 3–5	Allen (5–6)	**Niekro** (11–9)	–	2:46	45,426	56–46	L4
103	August 3	1:05 p.m. CDT	@ Mets	**W** 3–2 (10)	**Sambito** (7–1)	Reardon (6–6)	–	3:41	22,492	57–46	W1
104	August 4	7:35 p.m. CDT	Giants	**W** 4–2	**Ryan** (6–8)	Hargesheimer (2–1)	**Sambito** (11)	2:19	33,884	58–46	W2
105	August 5	7:35 p.m. CDT	Giants	L 3–9	Lavelle (5–5)	**Pladson** (0–3)	–	3:03	24,198	58–47	L1
106	August 6	7:35 p.m. CDT	Giants	**W** 1–0	**Forsch** (9–9)	Blue (9–6)	–	2:10	23,478	59–47	W1
107	August 7	7:35 p.m. CDT	Padres	L 1–5	Shirley (9–7)	**Niekro** (11–10)	–	2:59	20,044	59–48	L1
108	August 8	7:35 p.m. CDT	Padres	L 3–5	Eichelberger (3–0)	**Sambito** (7–2)	Fingers (15)	2:45	15,207	59–49	L2
109	August 9	7:35 p.m. CDT	Padres	**W** 9–5	**Smith** (2–4)	D'Acquisto (2–3)	–	2:50	21,233	60–49	W1
110	August 10	2:05 p.m. CDT	Padres	L 2–3	Wise (4–5)	**Sambito** (7–3)	–	2:21	20,514	60–50	L1
111	August 11	9:35 p.m. CDT	@ Giants	L 4–5	Blue (10–6)	**Forsch** (9–10)	Minton (12)	2:48	10,755	60–51	L2
112	August 12	9:35 p.m. CDT	@ Giants	L 0–2	Ripley (6–5)	**Niekro** (11–11)	Lavelle (6)	2:05	29,770	60–52	L3
113	August 13	2:05 p.m. CDT	@ Giants	L 5–6 (12)	Rowland (1–0)	**Smith** (2–5)	–	3:42	10,149	60–53	L4
114	August 14	3:00 p.m. CDT	@ Padres	**W** 2–1	**Ryan** (7–8)	Curtis (4–8)	–	2:18	12,150	61–53	W1
115	August 15	9:00 p.m. CDT	@ Padres	**W** 3–1 (20)	**Smith** (3–5)	Rasmussen (2–9)	–	6:17	14,177	62–53	W2
116	August 17 (1)	3:00 p.m. CDT	@ Padres	**W** 5–0	**Forsch** (10–10)	Jones (5–12)	–	2:06	N/A	63–53	W3
117	August 17 (2)	5:41 p.m. CDT	@ Padres	**W** 9–2	**Niekro** (12–11)	Mura (4–5)	–	2:23	16,120	64–53	W4
118	August 19	7:35 p.m. CDT	Pirates	**W** 5–2	**Ryan** (8–8)	Candelaria (8–13)	**Sambito** (12)	2:23	39,415	65–53	W5
119	August 20	7:35 p.m. CDT	Pirates	**W** 5–1	**Ruhle** (7–2)	Bibby (15–3)	**Smith** (6)	2:54	32,112	66–53	W6
120	August 21	7:35 p.m. CDT	Pirates	**W** 12–5	**Sambito** (8–3)	Blyleven (7–9)	–	2:59	33,884	67–53	W7
121	August 22	7:35 p.m. CDT	Cubs	**W** 3–2 (12)	**LaCorte** (8–3)	Caudill (1–3)	–	3:24	34,118	68–53	W8
122	August 23	7:35 p.m. CDT	Cubs	**W** 1–0 (17)	**Niekro** (13–11)	Riley (0–4)	–	4:47	25,031	69–53	W9
123	August 24	7:35 p.m. CDT	Cubs	**W** 2–1	**Ryan** (9–8)	Caudill (1–4)	–	2:22	25,703	70–53	W10
124	August 25	7:38 p.m. CDT	@ Cardinals	L 1–3	Hood (3–5)	**Ruhle** (7–3)	–	2:16	9,185	70–54	L1
125	August 26	7:37 p.m. CDT	@ Cardinals	**W** 7–2	**Niekro** (14–11)	Kaat (5–6)	–	2:18	10,859	71–54	W1
126	August 27	7:37 p.m. CDT	@ Cardinals	L 2–10	Martin (1–0)	**Forsch** (10–11)	–	2:41	10,025	71–55	L1
127	August 28	1:30 p.m. CDT	@ Cubs	**W** 4–1	**Andújar** (2–4)	Lamp (10–10)	**Sambito** (13)	2:47	18,694	72–55	W1
128	August 29	1:30 p.m. CDT	@ Cubs	**W** 6–5	**Smith** (4–5)	Tidrow (5–5)	**LaCorte** (10)	2:49	9,994	73–55	W2
129	August 30	1:15 p.m. CDT	@ Cubs	**W** 2–0	**Ruhle** (8–3)	McGlothen (9–10)	–	2:47	18,803	74–55	W3
130	August 31	1:15 p.m. CDT	@ Cubs	L 7–8	Tidrow (6–5)	**LaCorte** (8–4)	–	3:00	14,823	74–56	L1

September: 16–11 (Home: 10–5; Away: 6–6)

#	Date	Time (CT)	Opponent	Score	Win	Loss	Save	Time of Game	Attendance	Record	Box/ Streak
131	September 1 (1)	10:00 a.m. CDT	@ Pirates	**W** 10–4	**Smith** (5–5)	Robinson (5–8)	–	3:07	N/A	75–56	W1
132	September 1 (2)	2:42 p.m. CDT	@ Pirates	L 5–7	Rhoden (5–4)	**Pladson** (0–4)	Jackson (8)	2:57	26,374	75–57	L1
133	September 3	6:35 p.m. CDT	@ Pirates	L 4–10	Candelaria (10–13)	**Andújar** (2–5)	Romo (9)	3:00	18,502	75–58	L2
134	September 5	7:40 p.m. CDT	Cardinals	L 5–7	Seaman (3–1)	**Sambito** (8–4)	Frazier (2)	3:15	19,628	75–59	L3
135	September 6 (1)	5:38 p.m. CDT	Cardinals	**W** 9–5	**Niekro** (15–11)	Sykes (6–10)	**Niemann** (1)	2:40	N/A	76–59	W1
136	September 6 (2)	8:49 p.m. CDT	Cardinals	**W** 6–4	**Ruhle** (9–3)	Martin (1–1)	–	2:02	34,350	77–59	W2
137	September 7	6:09 p.m. CDT	Cardinals	L 0–2	Vuckovich (10–9)	**Forsch** (10–12)	–	2:00	16,475	77–60	L1
138	September 9	7:35 p.m. CDT	Dodgers	**W** 5–4	**Smith** (6–5)	Howe (6–7)	**Sambito** (14)	3:06	34,546	78–60	W1
139	September 10	7:35 p.m. CDT	Dodgers	**W** 6–5 (12)	**Roberge** (2–0)	Sutcliffe (3–9)	–	3:49	37,632	79–60	W2
140	September 12	7:35 p.m. CDT	Giants	**W** 5–3	**Niekro** (16–11)	Whitson (9–11)	**Smith** (7)	2:35	23,380	80–60	W3
141	September 13	7:35 p.m. CDT	Giants	**W** 3–2	**Forsch** (11–12)	Blue (13–8)	–	2:10	32,526	81–60	W4
142	September 14	6:05 p.m. CDT	Giants	**W** 6–4	**Andújar** (3–5)	Montefusco (4–8)	**Sambito** (15)	2:43	18,471	82–60	W5
143	September 15	7:35 p.m. CDT	Padres	L 3–6	Shirley (11–10)	**Ryan** (9–9)	–	2:30	9,578	82–61	L1
144	September 16	7:35 p.m. CDT	Padres	L 3–4	Curtis (8–8)	**Ruhle** (9–4)	Fingers (21)	2:57	20,383	82–62	L2
145	September 17	7:05 p.m. CDT	@ Reds	L 0–7	Soto (10–6)	**Niekro** (16–12)	–	2:37	25,092	82–63	L3
146	September 18	11:30 a.m. CDT	@ Reds	**W** 10–2	**Forsch** (12–12)	Pastore (11–7)	**Sambito** (16)	2:37	23,861	83–63	W1
147	September 19	9:40 p.m. CDT	@ Giants	L 3–4	Griffin (1–4)	**Andújar** (3–6)	Holland (6)	2:45	4,377	83–64	L1
148	September 20	3:07 p.m. CDT	@ Giants	**W** 3–2	**Smith** (7–5)	Lavelle (6–7)	**Sambito** (17)	2:53	16,770	84–64	W1
149	September 21	12:23 p.m. CDT	@ Giants	**W** 5–1	**Ruhle** (10–4)	Blue (14–9)	–	2:29	19,844	85–64	W2
150	September 22	9:00 p.m. CDT	@ Padres	**W** 4–2	**Niekro** (17–12)	Shirley (11–11)	–	2:40	16,513	86–64	W3
151	September 23	7:00 p.m. CDT	@ Padres	L 4–9	Curtis (9–8)	**Niemann** (0–1)	–	3:00	4,788	86–65	L1
152	September 24	6:35 p.m. CDT	@ Braves	L 2–4	Alexander (14–9)	**Andújar** (3–7)	Camp (20)	2:39	24,897	86–66	L2
153	September 25	6:35 p.m. CDT	@ Braves	**W** 4–2	**Ryan** (10–9)	Niekro (15–16)	**Smith** (8)	2:39	7,926	87–66	W1
154	September 26	7:35 p.m. CDT	Reds	**W** 2–0	**Ruhle** (11–4)	Seaver (10–8)	–	2:02	42,486	88–66	W2
155	September 27	2:05 p.m. CDT	Reds	**W** 2–0	**Niekro** (18–12)	Soto (10–7)	**Smith** (9)	2:25	40,305	89–66	W3
156	September 28	2:05 p.m. CDT	Reds	L 5–8	LaCoss (10–12)	**Andújar** (3–8)	Hume (24)	2:52	32,756	89–67	L1
157	September 30	7:35 p.m. CDT	Braves	**W** 7–3	**Ryan** (11–9)	Alexander (14–10)	**Smith** (10)	2:41	31,973	90–67	W1

October: 3–3 (Home: 2–0; Away: 1–3)

#	Date	Time (CT)	Opponent	Score	Win	Loss	Save	Time of Game	Attendance	Record	Box/ Streak
158	October 1	7:35 p.m. CDT	Braves	**W** 5–2	**Ruhle** (12–4)	Niekro (15–17)	–	2:06	35,600	91–67	W2
159	October 2	7:35 p.m. CDT	Braves	**W** 3–2	**Niekro** (19–12)	McWilliams (9–14)	**LaCorte** (11)	2:35	45,022	92–67	W3
160	October 3	9:30 p.m. CDT	@ Dodgers	L 2–3 (10)	Valenzuela (2–0)	**Forsch** (12–13)	–	2:45	49,642	92–68	L1
161	October 4	3:20 p.m. CDT	@ Dodgers	L 1–2	Reuss (18–6)	**Ryan** (11–10)	–	2:30	46,085	92–69	L2
162	October 5	3:00 p.m. CDT	@ Dodgers	L 3–4	Howe (7–9)	**LaCorte** (8–5)	Sutton (1)	3:33	52,339	92–70	L3
163	October 6	3:00 p.m. CDT	@ Dodgers	**W** 7–1	**Niekro** (20–12)	Goltz (7–11)	–	3:10	51,127	93–70	W1

=== Detailed records ===
National League
Opponent	W	L	WP	RS	RA
NL East
Chicago Cubs	11	1	0.917	48	23
Montreal Expos	5	7	0.417	41	49
New York Mets	8	4	0.667	51	42
Philadelphia Phillies	3	9	0.250	30	46
Pittsburgh Pirates	7	5	0.583	63	49
St. Louis Cardinals	7	5	0.583	44	46
Div Total	41	31	0.569	277	255
NL West
Atlanta Braves	11	7	0.611	77	81
Cincinnati Reds	10	8	0.556	85	73
**Houston Astros**					
Los Angeles Dodgers	9	10	0.474	73	72
San Diego Padres	11	7	0.611	64	55
San Francisco Giants	11	7	0.611	61	53
Div Total	52	39	0.571	360	334
Season Total	93	70	0.571	637	589

Month	Games	Won	Lost	Win %	RS	RA
April	18	13	5	0.722	88	53
May	26	12	14	0.462	79	91
June	27	18	9	0.667	102	87
July	29	13	16	0.448	108	135
August	30	18	12	0.600	118	98
September	27	16	11	0.593	121	111
October	6	3	3	0.500	21	14
Total	163	93	70	0.571	637	589

	Games	Won	Lost	Win %	RS	RA
Home	81	55	26	0.679	329	255
Away	82	38	44	0.463	308	334
Total	163	93	70	0.571	637	589

=== Postseason game log ===
Legend
	Astros win
	Astros loss
**Bold**	Astros team member

1980 Postseason game log: 2–3 (Home: 1–2; Away: 1–1)
NL Championship Series: vs. Philadelphia Phillies 2–3 (Home: 1–2; Away: 1–1)

#	Date	Time (CT)	Opponent	Score	Win	Loss	Save	Time of Game	Attendance	Series	Box/ Streak
1	October 7	7:15 p.m. CDT	@ Phillies	L 1–3	Carlton (1–0)	**Forsch** (0–1)	McGraw (1)	2:35	65,277	PHI 1–0	L1
2	October 8	7:15 p.m. CDT	@ Phillies	**W** 7–4 (10)	**LaCorte** (1–0)	Reed (0–1)	**Andújar** (1)	3:34	65,476	Tied 1–1	W1
3	October 10	2:00 p.m. CDT	Phillies	**W** 1–0 (11)	**Smith** (1–0)	McGraw (0–1)	—	3:22	44,443	HOU 2–1	W2
4	October 11	3:15 p.m. CDT	Phillies	L 3–5 (10)	Brusstar (1–0)	**Sambito** (0–1)	McGraw (2)	3:55	44,952	Tied 2–2	L1
5	October 12	7:00 p.m. CDT	Phillies	L 7–8 (10)	Ruthven (1–0)	**LaCorte** (1–1)	—	3:38	44,802	PHI 3–2	L2

=== Composite box ===
Team	1	2	3	4	5	6	7	8	9	10	11	12	13	14	15	16	17	18	19	20	R	H	E
Opponents	81	52	71	70	69	79	54	63	37	1	7	4	0	0	0	0	1	0	0	0	**589**	**1367**	**73**
**Houston**	94	101	80	70	67	57	62	50	40	2	6	5	0	0	0	0	1	0	0	2	**637**	**1455**	**140**

== Player statistics ==
Table legend
League top ten
Team leader

=== Batting ===
==== Starters by position ====
Note: Pos = Position; G = Games played; AB = At bats; H = Hits; Avg. = Batting average; HR = Home runs; RBI = Runs batted in

Pos	Player	G	AB	H	Avg.	HR	RBI
C	Alan Ashby	116	352	90	.256	3	48
1B	Art Howe	110	321	91	.283	10	46
2B	Joe Morgan	141	461	112	.243	11	49
3B	Enos Cabell	152	604	167	.276	2	55
SS	Craig Reynolds	137	381	86	.226	3	28
LF	José Cruz	160	612	185	.302	11	91
CF	César Cedeño	137	499	154	.309	10	73
RF	Terry Puhl	141	535	151	.282	13	55

==== Other batters ====
Note: G = Games played; AB = At bats; H = Hits; Avg. = Batting average; HR = Home runs; RBI = Runs batted in

Player	G	AB	H	Avg.	HR	RBI
Rafael Landestoy	149	393	97	.247	1	27
Denny Walling	100	284	85	.299	3	29
Luis Pujols	78	221	44	.199	0	20
Jeffrey Leonard	88	216	46	.213	3	20
Danny Heep	33	87	24	.276	0	6
Dave Bergman	90	78	20	.256	0	3
Gary Woods	19	53	20	.377	2	15
Julio González	40	52	6	.115	0	1
Bruce Bochy	22	22	4	.182	0	0
Scott Loucks	8	3	1	.333	0	0
Mike Fischlin	1	1	0	.000	0	0
Alan Knicely	1	1	0	.000	0	0

=== Pitching ===
==== Starting pitchers ====
Note: G = Games pitched; IP = Innings pitched; W = Wins; L = Losses; ERA = Earned run average; SO = Strikeouts

Player	G	IP	W	L	ERA	SO
Joe Niekro	37	256.0	20	12	3.55	127
Nolan Ryan	35	233.2	11	10	3.35	200
Ken Forsch	32	222.1	12	13	3.20	84
Vern Ruhle	28	159.1	12	4	2.37	55
J. R. Richard	17	113.2	10	4	1.90	119

==== Other pitchers ====
Note: G = Games pitched; IP = Innings pitched; W = Wins; L = Losses; ERA = Earned run average; S0 = Strikeouts

Player	G	IP	W	L	ERA	SO
Joaquín Andújar	35	122.0	3	8	3.91	75
Gordie Pladson	12	41.1	0	4	4.35	13

==== Relief pitchers ====
Note: G = Games pitched; IP = Innings pitched; W = Wins; L = Losses; SV = Saves; ERA = Earned run average; SO = Strikeouts

Player	G	IP	W	L	SV	ERA	SO
Joe Sambito	64	90.1	8	4	17	2.19	75
Dave Smith	57	102.2	7	5	10	1.93	85
Frank LaCorte	55	83.0	8	5	11	2.82	66
Randy Niemann	22	33.0	0	1	1	5.45	18
Bert Roberge	14	24.1	2	0	0	5.92	9
Bobby Sprowl	1	1.0	0	0	0	0.00	3

== National League Championship Series ==
=== Game 1 ===
October 7: Veterans Stadium, Philadelphia

Team	1	2	3	4	5	6	7	8	9	R	H	E
Houston	0	0	1	0	0	0	0	0	0	1	7	0
Philadelphia	0	0	0	0	0	2	1	0	X	3	8	1
W: Steve Carlton (1–0) L: Ken Forsch (0–1) S: Tug McGraw (1)
HR: HOU – None PHI – Greg Luzinski (1)
Pitchers: HOU – Forsch PHI – Carlton, McGraw (8)
Attendance: 65,277

Ken Forsch started the first-ever playoff game in Astros history.

=== Game 2 ===
October 8: Veterans Stadium, Philadelphia

Team	1	2	3	4	5	6	7	8	9	10	R	H	E
Houston	0	0	1	0	0	0	1	1	0	4	7	8	1
Philadelphia	0	0	0	2	0	0	0	1	0	1	4	14	2
W: Frank LaCorte (1–0) L: Ron Reed (0–1) S: Joaquín Andújar (1)
HR: HOU – None PHI – None
Pitchers: HOU – Ryan, Sambito (7), Smith (7), LaCorte (9), Andújar (10) PHI – Ruthven, McGraw (8), Reed (9), Saucier (10)
Attendance: 65,476

=== Game 3 ===
October 10: Astrodome, Houston, Texas

Team	1	2	3	4	5	6	7	8	9	10	11	R	H	E
Philadelphia	0	0	0	0	0	0	0	0	0	0	0	0	7	1
Houston	0	0	0	0	0	0	0	0	0	0	1	1	6	1
W: Dave Smith (1–0) L: Tug McGraw (0–1) S: None
HR: PHI – None HOU – None
Pitchers: PHI – Christenson, Noles (7), McGraw (8) HOU – Niekro, Smith (11)
Attendance: 44,443

=== Game 4 ===
October 11: Astrodome, Houston, Texas

Team	1	2	3	4	5	6	7	8	9	10	R	H	E
Philadelphia	0	0	0	0	0	0	0	3	0	2	5	13	0
Houston	0	0	0	1	1	0	0	0	1	0	3	5	2
W: Warren Brusstar (1–0) L: Joe Sambito (0–1) S: Tug McGraw (2)
HR: PHI – None HOU – None
Pitchers: PHI – Carlton, Noles (6), Saucier (7), Reed (7), Brusstar (8), McGraw (10) HOU – Ruhle, Smith (8), Sambito (8)
Attendance: 44,952

=== Game 5 ===
October 12: Astrodome, Houston, Texas

Game 5 capped the series in fitting fashion, with seemingly endless surprises and excitement. The Astros jumped to an early lead in the first on a run-scoring double by José Cruz. Philadelphia bounced back to take the lead on a two-run single by Bob Boone in the second. The Astros saw Luis Pujols and Enos Cabell thrown out at the plate in the second and fifth, but finally broke through to tie the game 2–2 on an unearned run in the sixth, thanks to an error by Philadelphia's less than surehanded left fielder Greg Luzinski.

Houston took what seemed like a solid 5–2 lead in the seventh on an RBI single by Denny Walling, a wild pitch from Phillies reliever Larry Christenson, and a run-scoring triple by Art Howe. A three-run deficit in the eighth inning against Nolan Ryan seemed insurmountable. But the Phillies would not die. They loaded the bases with nobody out on three straight singles, including two infield hits, and then got two runs on a walk to Pete Rose and a groundout by Keith Moreland. An RBI single by Del Unser tied the game 5–5, and then Manny Trillo put the Phillies ahead with a two-run triple.

The Astros promptly came back to tie the game in the bottom of the eighth, with Rafael Landestoy and José Cruz each singling in a run. Neither team scored in the ninth, but the Phillies got doubles from Unser and Garry Maddox in the tenth to take an 8–7 lead. Philadelphia's Dick Ruthven retired the Astros in order in the bottom of the tenth, and the Phillies had won their first pennant since 1950. They went on to defeat the Kansas City Royals four games to two in the World Series.

Team	1	2	3	4	5	6	7	8	9	10	R	H	E
Philadelphia	0	2	0	0	0	0	0	5	0	1	8	13	2
Houston	1	0	0	0	0	1	3	2	0	0	7	14	0
W: Dick Ruthven (1–0) L: Frank LaCorte (1–1) S: None
HR: PHI – None HOU – None
Pitchers: PHI – Bystrom, Brusstar (6), Christenson (7), Reed (7), McGraw (8), Ruthven (9) HOU – Ryan, Sambito (8), Forsch (8), LaCorte (9)
Attendance: 44,802

=== Composite Box ===
1980 National League Championship Series (3–2): Philadelphia Phillies over Houston Astros

Team	1	2	3	4	5	6	7	8	9	10	11	R	H	E
Philadelphia Phillies	0	2	0	2	0	2	1	9	0	4	0	20	55	6
Houston Astros	1	0	2	1	1	1	4	3	1	4	1	19	40	3
Total Attendance: 264,950 Average Attendance: 52,990

== Awards and achievements ==
=== Grand slams ===
No.	Date	Astros batter	Venue	Inning	Pitcher	Opposing team	Box
1	August 26	César Cedeño	Busch Memorial Stadium	5 (Note: Tied score or took lead)	Jim Kaat	St. Louis Cardinals	
2	September 6 (Note: Game 2 of doubleheader)	José Cruz (Note: 1st MLB grand slam)	Astrodome	3	John Martin	St. Louis Cardinals	

=== Pitching achievements ===
==== No-hit bids ====
Date	Starting pitcher (IP)	Relief pitcher(s) (IP)	No-hit IP	GS	Catcher	Batter	Final	Opponent	Box
September 21, 1980	Vern Ruhle (9)	—	7 2/3	81	Luis Pujols	Jim Wohlford	5–1	San Francisco Giants	
Note: Includes those games started with 7 or more no-hit innings.

=== Awards ===
1980 Houston Astros award winners
Name of award		Recipient	Ref.
Associated Press (AP) All-Star	Outfielder	César Cedeño	
Houston Astros Most Valuable Player (MVP) Award		José Cruz	
MLB All-Star Game	Starting pitcher	J. R. Richard	
MLB All-Star Game	Reserve outfielder	José Cruz	
National League (NL) Pitcher of the Month	April	J. R. Richard	
NL Player of the Week	August 24	Joe Sambito	
The Sporting News	Executive of the Year	Tal Smith	
The Sporting News	Manager of the Year	Bill Virdon	
The Sporting News	NL All-Star Outfielder	César Cedeño	

Other awards results

Name of award	Voting recipient(s) (Team)	Ref.
NL Cy Young	1st—Carlton (PHI) • 4th—J. Niekro (HOU) • 5th—Sambito (HOU)	
NL Most Valuable Player	1st—Schmidt (PHI) • 3rd—Cruz (HOU); Other Astros: 13th—Cedeño • 19th—J. Niekro	
NL Rookie of the Year	1st—Howe (LAD) • 5th—D. Smith (HOU)	
Roberto Clemente	Winner—P. Niekro (ATL) • Nominee—Cruz (HOU)	

=== League leaders ===
- Bases on balls (batting): Joe Morgan (93)
- Bases on balls (pitching): Nolan Ryan (98)

Fielding

- Errors: Enos Cabell (29)

=== Milestones ===
==== Major League debuts ====
Player—Appeared at position

- Dave Smith, relief pitcher
Date and opponent

- April 11 vs Los Angeles
Box

Also:

== Minor league system ==
Level	Team	League	Manager
AAA	Tucson Toros	Pacific Coast League	Jimmy Johnson
AA	Columbus Astros	Southern League	Matt Galante
A	Daytona Beach Astros	Florida State League	Carlos Alfonso
Rookie	GCL Astros Blue	Gulf Coast League	Eric Swanson
Rookie	GCL Astros Orange	Gulf Coast League	Fernando Tatís

Awards

- Pacific Coast League Manager of the Year: Jimmy Johnson

== See also ==
- 3,000 strikeout club
- List of Major League Baseball All-Star Game starting pitchers
- List of Major League Baseball annual fielding errors leaders
- List of Major League Baseball franchise postseason streaks
- List of Major League Baseball individual streaks
- List of Major League Baseball players who spent their entire career with one franchise
- List of Major League Baseball tie-breakers
