= Ken Forsch =

American baseball player (born 1946)

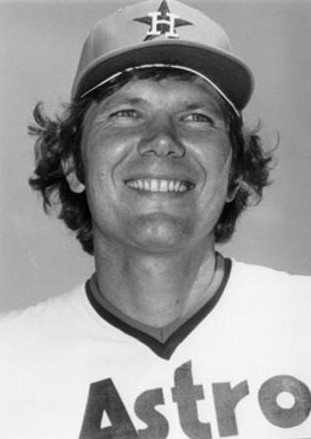
- Forsch in 1976
- Pitcher
- Born: September 8, 1946 (age 79); Sacramento, California, U.S.
- Batted: Right Threw: Right

MLB debut
- September 7, 1970, for the Houston Astros

Last MLB appearance
- May 23, 1986, for the California Angels

MLB statistics
- Win–loss record: 114–113
- Earned run average: 3.37
- Strikeouts: 1,047
- Stats at Baseball Reference

Teams
- Houston Astros (1970–1980); California Angels (1981–1984, 1986)

Career highlights and awards
- 2× All-Star (1976, 1981); Pitched a no-hitter on April 7, 1979

Kenneth Roth Forsch (born September 8, 1946) is an American former professional baseball player. He played in Major League Baseball (MLB) as a right-handed pitcher from 1970 to 1984, most prominently as a member of the Houston Astros where he helped the franchise win its first-ever National League Western Division title and postseason berth in 1980. A two-time All-Star player, Forsch pitched a no-hitter for the Astros on April 7, 1979. He ended his baseball career playing for the California Angels.

== Career ==
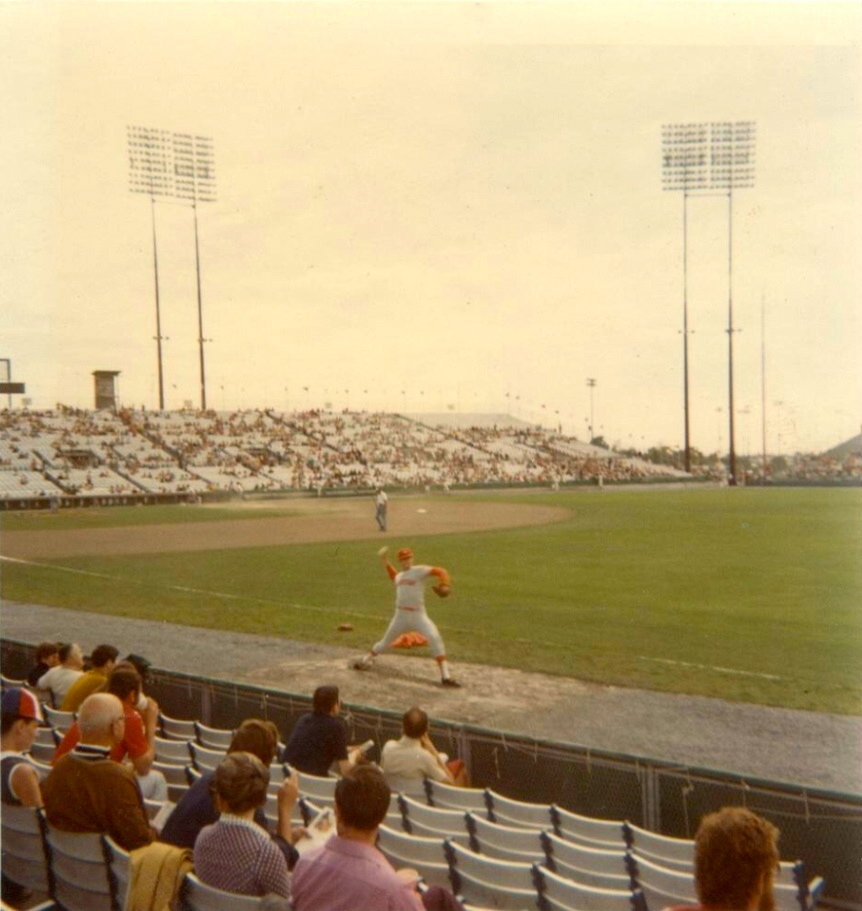
Houston Astros pitcher Ken Forsch warms up at Jarry Park Stadium in 1971.

Forsch was born in Sacramento, California where he graduated from Hiram Johnson High School and later attended the Oregon State University where he played for the Oregon State Beavers baseball team through the 1967–1968 seasons. He was selected by the Houston Astros in the 18th round (399th overall) of the 1968 Major League Baseball draft. He made his major league debut on September 7, 1970 at the age of 23.

Forsch was selected to the All-Star Game in 1976 and 1981.

On April 7, 1979, Forsch no-hit the Atlanta Braves 6–0 at the Astrodome. His brother Bob Forsch, who also pitched for the Astros, hurled two no-hitters while with the St. Louis Cardinals, making them the only set of brothers to pitch no-hitters in MLB history. The 1980 season went down to the wire, and Forsch was a part of the action. He went 12-13 during the season with a 3.20 ERA and on a then career-high 222.1 innings pitched; the rotation of him, Nolan Ryan, Joe Niekro, and J. R. Richard was slated to make a run at the National League West title, which they missed winning by one game the previous year. However, a stroke suffered by Richard late in the year saw the eventual end of his career. The Astros required a one-game playoff on October 6 after the Astros lost three straight games to the Los Angeles Dodgers in Dodger Stadium. Forsch had lost the first game on October 3 when trying to hang on to a precarious 2-1 lead. However, a single and a subsequent error set the stage for a Ron Cey base hit with two out to send the game into the 10th inning. On the first batter of the inning, Forsch allowed a home run that gave the Dodgers a 3-2 victory. The Astros prevailed in the tiebreaker game thanks to the efforts of Joe Niekro that set the Astros up in the 1980 National League Championship Series against the Philadelphia Phillies for Game 1 on the following day of October 7. Forsch was selected to start the game, which was the first playoff game in the history of the Astros. Facing Steve Carlton at Veterans Stadium, Forsch went eight innings and allowed three runs on eight hits with a walk and five strikeouts, as the Phillies broke through in the 6th on a two-run home run by Greg Luzinski and an pinch hit RBI single by Greg Gross in the 7th that got the Phillies a 3-1 victory. In Game 5, the Astros were on the verge of a pennant but needed relief down the stretch. They were leading 5-2 in the 8th inning, but Nolan Ryan had been taken out after allowing three hits and a walk to make the score 5-3 with the bases loaded. Forsch was put in after Joe Sambito had got a groundout to make it 5-4 with one out and two on. He struck out Mike Schmidt, but when facing Del Unser, Forsch allowed a base hit to right field that tied the game at 5. Now facing Manny Trillo, Forsch delivered a pitch that was smacked for a triple to left to clear the bases and give the Phillies a 7-5 lead. Forsch was pinch hit for in the 9th, which saw the Astros tie the game in the eventual loss in the 10th inning. It was the last appearance of Forsch in an Astros uniform and his only experience in the postseason. He was traded to the California Angels for Dickie Thon in April of 1981, eschewing the idea of being relegated to the bullpen and demanding a trade when general manager Al Rosen had acquired Don Sutton and Bob Knepper in the offseason.

In the strike-shortened 1981 season, Forsch went 11-7 with a 2.88 ERA in 153 innings, pitching a league high four shutouts while having 55 strikeouts. He was named to the All-Star Game for the second and final time. He went 13-11 in 1982, but he did not pitch in the postseason run by the Angels that saw them lose in the ALCS in five games. He went 11-12 in 1983 before suffering a setback in 1984, where he pitched in just two games, as he suffered a dislocated shoulder on April 7 when diving to the bag on a fielding play that had him land on his right elbow. He returned as a free agent in 1986, pitching as a middleman in ten games for 17 innings that saw him have a 9.53 ERA before being released on May 25.

During his 16-year career, Forsch compiled 114 wins, 1,047 strikeouts, and a 3.37 earned run average. After his career ended, He worked in commercial real estate along with serving as a member of the Angels’ Speakers Bureau before applying to work for the Angels as their director of player development, which was accepted. He worked for four years before having a promotion to assistant general manager in 1998. He won a World Series ring when the Angels won the championship in 2002. He was dismissed in 2011.

== See also ==
- Houston Astros award winners and league leaders
- List of Houston Astros no-hitters
- List of Major League Baseball no-hitters

Awards and achievements
| Preceded by Tom Seaver | No-hitter pitcher April 7, 1979 | Succeeded by Jerry Reuss |
| Preceded by Gaylord Perry | National League Pitcher of the Month; April 1979 | Succeeded by Joe Niekro |
