= Bourjos =

Bourjos is a surname. Notable people with the surname include:

- Chris Bourjos (born 1954), American baseball player and scout, father of Peter
- Peter Bourjos (born 1987), American baseball player
