= 1980 National League West tie-breaker game =

1980 Major League Baseball tie-breaker game

	1	2	3	4	5	6	7	8	9	R	H	E
Houston Astros	2	0	2	3	0	0	0	0	0	7	12	1
Los Angeles Dodgers	0	0	0	1	0	0	0	0	0	1	6	2
- Date: October 6, 1980
- Venue: Dodger Stadium
- City: Los Angeles, California
- Umpires: HP: Doug Harvey; 1B: Nick Colosi; 2B: Paul Runge; 3B: Jerry Dale
- Attendance: 51,127
- Television: ABC; KRIV-TV (HOU); KTTV (LAD)
- TV announcers: ABC: Al Michaels and Bob Uecker; KRIV-TV: Gene Elston, Dewayne Staats and Larry Dierker; KTTV: Vin Scully, Jerry Doggett and Ross Porter
- Radio: CBS; KPRC (HOU); KABC (LAD)
- Radio announcers: CBS: Lindsey Nelson and Jerry Coleman; KPRC: Elston, Staats and Dierker; KABC: Scully, Doggett and Porter

The 1980 National League West tie-breaker game was a one-game extension to Major League Baseball's (MLB) 1980 regular season, played between the Houston Astros and Los Angeles Dodgers to decide the winner of the National League's (NL) West Division. The game was played on October 6, 1980, at Dodger Stadium in Los Angeles, California. It was necessary after the Dodgers overcame a three-game deficit in the final three games of the season and both teams finished with identical win–loss records of 92–70. The Dodgers won a coin flip late in the season which, by rule at the time, awarded them home field for the game.

The Astros won the game, 7–1, with Houston starter Joe Niekro throwing a complete game. This victory advanced the Astros to the 1980 NL Championship Series (NLCS), in which they lost to the Philadelphia Phillies, ending the Astros' season. In baseball statistics, the tie-breaker counted as the 163rd regular season game for both teams, with all events in the game added to regular season statistics.

== Background ==
The Cincinnati Reds had won the West Division in 1979, with the Astros finishing 1.5 games back in second and the Dodgers 11.5 back in third. However, Cincinnati went on to lose the 1979 NLCS in three games to the eventual World Series champion Pittsburgh Pirates, ending their season. The Astros acquired Joe Morgan and Nolan Ryan via free agency during the offseason and the Dodgers signed Dave Goltz. Dave Kindred of The Washington Post, George Vecsey of The New York Times, and Astros' relief pitcher Joe Sambito all credited Houston's success in 1980 to Morgan's leadership.

The Reds attained early success in 1980 with an eight-game winning streak to open the season, and held at least a share of first place in the division until April 30. They were not as successful over the remainder of the season, only occasionally taking the division lead and last holding it on August 16. The Astros held the lead for the majority of the season thereafter, including a three-game lead over Los Angeles entering the final series of the season. The series matched the Astros with the Dodgers for three games at Dodger Stadium. The Dodgers won all three games, all by a single run, stopping the Astros from clinching a division championship as the two teams sat tied at 92–70. Kindred described the Astros as losing each game of the series by "fail[ing] to make elementary fielding plays." The final game included a run-scoring pinch hit single by Manny Mota, who had almost exclusively been a coach and not a player that season, and a home run by Ron Cey which scored Steve Garvey, who had reached base in the previous at bat on an error. The Dodgers needed each of these runs as they won the game 4–3.

== Game summary ==
Art Howe hit the game's only home run in the third inning.

Monday, October 6, 1980 1:00 pm (PDT) at Dodger Stadium in Los Angeles, California 67 °F (19 °C), Sunny
Team	1	2	3	4	5	6	7	8	9	R	H	E
Houston	2	0	2	3	0	0	0	0	0	7	12	1
Los Angeles	0	0	0	1	0	0	0	0	0	1	6	2
WP: Joe Niekro (20–12) LP: Dave Goltz (7–11); Home runs: HOU: Art Howe (10); LAD: None; Attendance: 51,127

The Astros took the lead early, scoring in the top of the first inning. Terry Puhl led off the game reaching base on an error by Los Angeles second baseman Davey Lopes. Enos Cabell followed Puhl with a single and, while Joe Morgan batted, stole second base to put runners at second and third. Morgan struck out and José Cruz appeared to hit into a fielder's choice, but an error by catcher Joe Ferguson allowed Puhl to score, Cabell to advance to third base, and Cruz to reach safely, all with no out recorded. Cabell then scored on a César Cedeño ground out to make the score 2–0. Art Howe singled to advance Cruz to third, but Dodgers' starting pitcher Dave Goltz escaped the inning without further scoring.

The Astros' Joe Niekro retired the Dodgers in order in the first and second innings. The Astros added to their lead in the top of the third as Cedeño singled, stole second (after Cruz had been caught stealing earlier in the inning), and scored on Art Howe's home run to make the game 4–0. Niekro allowed two successive singles to lead off the bottom of the inning, but proceeded to retire three straight Dodgers without allowing either runner to score. The Astros further added to their lead in the fourth, as Puhl singled on a bunt to third base and then stole second and third base while Cabell batted. Both he and Morgan walked to load the bases with one out. Puhl scored on a Cruz sacrifice fly, Cedeño walked to re-load the bases, and finally a Howe single gave the Astros another two runs to make the game 7–0.

The Dodgers scored their only run in the bottom of the fourth as Dusty Baker singled, advanced to second on an error, and scored on another single. They threatened again in the sixth inning, loading the bases, though they failed to score. That was the only inning after the fourth in which a Dodgers' runner reached scoring position. Niekro steadied again after the sixth, allowing just one baserunner on a two-out ninth-inning single over the remaining three innings before Dave Bergman fielded the final out on a groundball near first base to clinch the first division title in Astros history.

== Aftermath ==
Houston's win clinched the team's first postseason berth in franchise history. The Astros lost the five-game NLCS to the Phillies 3–2, ending their season. Due to the 1981 Major League Baseball strike, the following season was split into halves and the winner of each half advanced to the postseason. The Dodgers won the first half and the Astros the second and so met in the first National League Division Series. The Dodgers won the series 3–2 after Houston held a 2–0 series lead heading to Los Angeles (reminiscent to Los Angeles needing all three games at home during this season to force this tiebreaker), and went on to win the 1981 World Series. The Astros did not return to the NLCS until 1986 and did not win a NL pennant until 2005, leading to a loss in the 2005 World Series.

In baseball statistics, tie-breakers counted as regular season games, with all events in them added to regular season statistics. Niekro, for example, reached his 20th win to break a tie with Jim Bibby for the second most wins in the NL that season. Similarly, Steve Garvey played in his 163rd game of the season, leading the league with a figure which could not have been equaled by anyone not on the Astros or Dodgers. Dusty Baker won a Silver Slugger Award and Steve Howe, who pitched the final two scoreless innings of the tie-breaker for the Dodgers in relief, won the Rookie of the Year Award for their performances in the regular season. Additionally six Dodgers (Garvey, Davey Lopes, Bill Russell, Reggie Smith, Jerry Reuss, and Bob Welch) and two Astros (J. R. Richard and Cruz) were named to the National League's All-Star team.

In later years, after his retirement in 1996, Lasorda stated he regretted using a 19-year old Fernando Valenzuela out of the bullpen during the October 5 game vs. the Astros, thinking he could have saved Fernando to start in a potential tie-breaker game instead. This decision caused the team to start Dave Goltz in the tie-breaker game. Goltz recorded double-digit wins for six straight seasons in Minnesota, but his first season in Dodger Blue was a disappointment. He entered the most important game of the season with a 7–10 record. Nevertheless, Valenzuela still pitched in the tie-breaker game and threw two scoreless innings, though at that point, the score was 7–1. A year later, Valenzuela would have a breakout season, helping lead the Dodgers to a World Championship.

Due to tiebreaker games being abolished in 2022, this would end up being the only time that two teams had played each other in a tiebreaker game and a regularly scheduled series at the same stadium back to back.
