= Frank LaCorte =

American baseball player (born 1951)

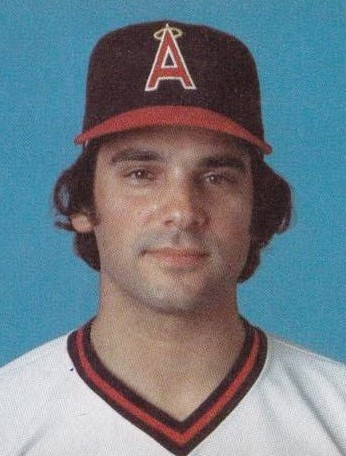
- Pitcher
- Born: October 13, 1951 (age 75); San Jose, California, U.S.
- Batted: Right Threw: Right

MLB debut
- September 8, 1975, for the Atlanta Braves

Last MLB appearance
- September 24, 1984, for the California Angels

MLB statistics
- Win–loss record: 23–44
- Earned run average: 5.01
- Strikeouts: 372
- Stats at Baseball Reference

Teams
- Atlanta Braves (1975–1979); Houston Astros (1979–1983); California Angels (1984)

Frank Joseph LaCorte (/ləˈkɔːrti/ la-KOR-tee; born October 13, 1951) is an American former professional baseball pitcher. He played in Major League Baseball (MLB) from 1975–1984 for the Atlanta Braves, Houston Astros, and California Angels. A right-hander, he stood 6 feet 1 inch (1.85 m) tall and weighed 180 pounds (82 kg).

== Early career ==
LaCorte attended Gilroy High School then Gavilan College and was signed by the Braves as an undrafted free agent in 1972. He broke into the Majors late in his third professional season, and would play all or part of ten years in the MLB. Initially a starting pitcher, LaCorte hurled for the perennially struggling late-1970s Braves for the first 44 games pitched of his MLB career. He won only four of 28 decisions (.143) and compiled a poor 6.23 earned run average in 179 innings pitched during his tenure with the Braves.

== Effective member of Astros' bullpen ==
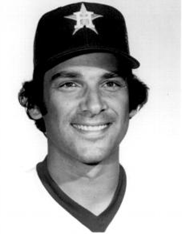
1983 publicity photo of LaCorte for Houston Astros

On May 25, 1979, he was traded to Houston (for pitcher Bo McLaughlin) and eventually established himself with the Astros as a relief pitcher. LaCorte was a member of the 1980 National League West Division champion Astros. Along with Joe Sambito and Dave Smith, he was an integral part of the club's successful bullpen. His statistics from the 1980 season were his career best in wins (8), ERA (2.82), games pitched (55), games finished (44), and saves (11).

He appeared in two games in relief in the 1980 National League Championship Series, and was the winner in Game 2's 7–4 Houston win. That win on October 8 was the first postseason victory in Astros history. However, in the deciding fifth game, LaCorte gave up doubles to Del Unser and Garry Maddox in the tenth inning, as the Philadelphia Phillies broke a 7–7 deadlock to win their first National League title in 30 years.

During a May 26, 1982, game against the Montreal Expos, LaCorte walked a batter with the bases loaded. He was so angry that he burned his uniform when he returned to the clubhouse.

During his Major League career, LaCorte appeared in 253 total games — only 32 as a starting pitcher — and allowed 457 hits and 258 bases on balls in 490 innings pitched. He notched 372 strikeouts and 26 saves to go along with his 23 Major-League wins. He retired from professional baseball after the 1984 season.

== Post-baseball career ==
Upon his retirement, LaCorte moved back to Gilroy, California, where he was raised, and purchased a tow truck business named Marx Towing. His wife is a former beauty pageant queen. They have been married for more than 40 years and have two grown children.

On December 3, 1985, LaCorte was driving in Gilroy and hit Anne Swift (age 88) and Alice Denhard (age 68) with his car while they were crossing the street in a crosswalk. Anne Swift died on January 15, 1986. LaCorte pleaded no contest to a misdemeanor charge of vehicular manslaughter, and was sentenced to a $1,700 fine, 200 hours of community service, and 3 years probation.
