= Terry Puhl =

Canadian baseball player

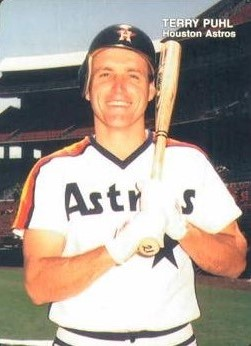
- Outfielder
- Born: July 8, 1956 (age 70); Melville, Saskatchewan, Canada
- Batted: Left Threw: Right

MLB debut
- July 12, 1977, for the Houston Astros

Last MLB appearance
- May 29, 1991, for the Kansas City Royals

MLB statistics
- Batting average: .280
- Home runs: 62
- Runs batted in: 435
- Stats at Baseball Reference

Teams
- Houston Astros (1977–1990); Kansas City Royals (1991)

Career highlights and awards
- All-Star (1978); Houston Astros Hall of Fame

Member of the Canadian

Baseball Hall of Fame
- Induction: 1995
Coaching career
Coaching career (HC unless noted)
2007–2022	UHV Jaguars
Head coaching record
Overall	333–353 (.485)
Tournaments	5–6 (NAIA)
Accomplishments and honors
Championships
2× AII tournament (2009, 2010)
Awards
Canadian Baseball Player of the Year (1981); Tip O'Neill Award (1984); Saskatchewan Sports Hall of Fame (1994); Texas Baseball Hall of Fame (2006)

Terry Stephen Puhl (born July 8, 1956) is a Canadian former professional baseball player and coach. He played in Major League Baseball (MLB) as an outfielder from 1977 to 1991, most prominently as a member of the Houston Astros, where he helped the franchise win its first National League West division title and postseason berth in 1980. He also played for the Kansas City Royals.

A National League (NL) All-Star in 1978, Puhl also won the first Tip O'Neill Award in 1984. He excelled defensively as an outfielder, committing just 18 errors in 1,300 career games. Puhl's .993 fielding percentage is the best among outfielders in Astros history and ranks eighth all-time among all outfielders in NL history.

Following his playing career, Puhl served as the head coach of the University of Houston–Victoria's baseball team and the manager of the Canada national baseball team. He was inducted into the Saskatchewan Sports Hall of Fame in 1994 and into the Canadian Baseball Hall of Fame in 1995. He was inducted into the Houston Astros Hall of Fame in 2022.

== Early life ==
Puhl was born and raised in Melville, Saskatchewan. In high school, he played baseball, volleyball, and football and ran track. Pitching on a Midget League team, he led the club to a Canadian championship and was named the nation's outstanding pitcher. He was signed by the Houston Astros in 1973. Astros scout Harry Morgan signed Puhl to play in the outfield, a role that the pitcher had never played before.

== Playing career ==
=== Minor league career ===
Puhl made his professional debut with the rookie-league Covington Astros the following season, batting .284. Over the next three seasons, he advanced through the Astros' farm system, playing with the single-A Dubuque Packers in 1975, then splitting the season between the double-A Columbus Astros and the triple-A Memphis Blues in 1976, and finally with the triple-A Charleston Charlies in 1977.

=== Major league career ===
Puhl was called up to the majors in July 1977, and never returned to the minor leagues. He was quickly installed as the club's regular left fielder, replacing Jim Fuller. In his first major league game on July 12, Puhl entered as a defensive replacement for Fuller. The following day, he got his first hit in the 13th inning of a game against the Los Angeles Dodgers, off reliever Elías Sosa. Later that inning, Puhl scored the winning run on Bob Watson's double. He finished the 1977 season with a .301 batting average in 60 games.

The following year, he was the sole Astro selected as an NL All-Star. He played in 149 games and batted .289, with 169 hits, 25 doubles, and 32 stolen bases (the most he would ever have in a season). The following year, he played in 157 games (the most he would play in one season), while having his numbers rise and drop slightly, such as batting .287/.352/.377, with 172 hits, 22 doubles, 49 runs batted in (RBIs), and 30 stolen bases. Puhl played a key part in the Astros making 1980 a banner year. He played in 141 games while batting .282 with 151 hits, 24 doubles, and 27 stolen bases. In the 1980 National League West tie-breaker game versus the Los Angeles Dodgers, he led off the game by reaching first base on an error and then scored the first run of the game when he charged into the catcher when running from third to home that dislodged the ball. The Astros won 7–1 to win their first NL West title. In the 1980 National League Championship Series against the Philadelphia Phillies, Puhl set a then NL-championship series record with a .526 batting average in a losing cause, the best performance ever by a hitter in a play-off series at the time. As of 2019, Puhl has the 19th best lifetime fielding percentage by an outfielder (.993). He committed only 18 errors in 2,660 total chances. In 1981, he was named Canadian Baseball player of the year. That year, he played in 96 games while batting .251 with 88 hits, 19 doubles, and 22 stolen bases. Puhl recorded his 1,000th hit off Tim Lollar on August 4, 1984, doing so on a single.

A pulled hamstring in 1985 and an ankle injury in 1986 reduced Puhl's playing time. He played in just 57 games in 1985, 81 in 1986, and 90 in 1987 (batting .284, .244, and .230, respectively). He had one more return to effective hitting in 1988, batting .303/.395/.389 in 113 games, with 71 hits and 22 stolen bases.

Puhl was granted free-agent status in 1990 and signed with the New York Mets on December 13, 1990. He was released by the Mets during spring training on April 1, 1991, and signed by the Kansas City Royals on April 25, 1991. Puhl's final MLB game was on May 29, 1991, after which he was released by the Royals on June 9, ending his MLB career. Puhl's career statistics included a .280 batting average, 62 home runs, 676 runs, 435 RBIs, and 217 stolen bases. He accumulated 1,361 hits in 1,531 games. Puhl was particularly effective in postseason play, batting .372 in 13 games over three series. As of 2020, Puhl still ranks in the top 10 in numerous categories for the Astros, such as WAR (10th, 28.5), games played (fifth, 1,516), and hits (eighth, 1,357).

== After his playing career ==
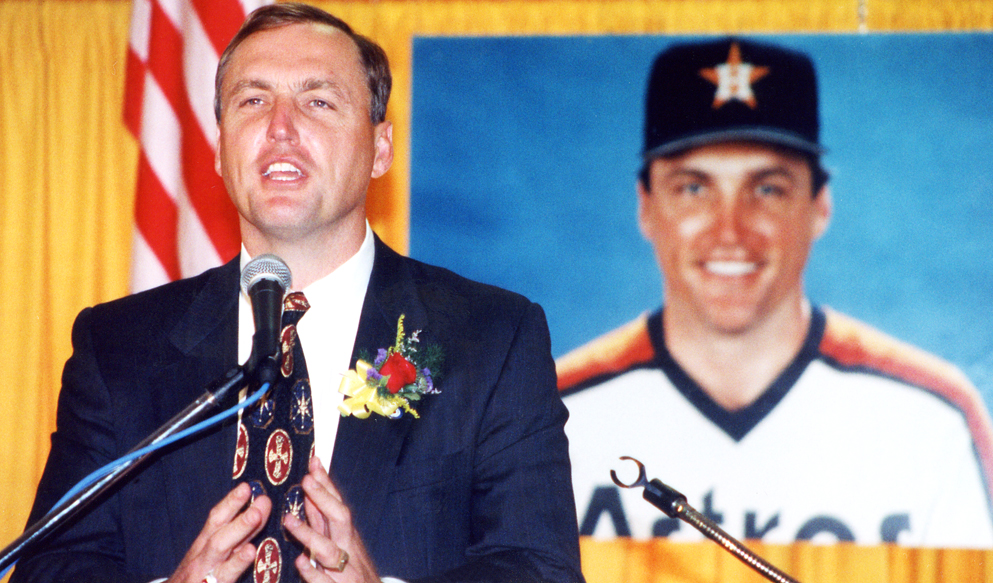
Puhl at his Canadian Baseball Hall of Fame induction

After Puhl's retirement in 1991, he was inducted into the Saskatchewan Sports Hall of Fame in 1994 and to the Canadian Baseball Hall of Fame in 1995. In November 2006, Puhl was inducted into the Texas Baseball Hall of Fame.

In August 2006, Puhl coached the Canadian National Senior team at the Olympic qualifier in Cuba. Canada advanced to the next round of qualifiers in 2007. In a 15–12 defeat of Panama, Puhl replaced catcher David Corrente with pinch hitter Reed Eastley in the eighth inning, despite the fact Corrente had four hits in four at bats. Eastley hit a three-run home run to tie the game. In the bottom of the ninth, Reed Eastley came to bat for a second time, this time with the bases loaded and the game on the line. Puhl instead called on pinch hitter Jeremy Ware, whose grand slam won the game for Canada.

In November 2006, Puhl was announced as the first head baseball coach at the University of Houston–Victoria. The UHV Jaguars were previously an independent team of the NAIA, but became a member of the NAIA's Red River Athletic Conference in the 2015–16 season. He won his 300th career game on January 30, 2021.

Puhl's son, Stephen Puhl, was a minor-league baseball player. Selected in the 17th round (514th overall) of the 2006 Major League Baseball draft by the New York Mets, Stephen was originally a catcher in the Mets system in 2006, then pitched for the organization in 2007 and 2008.

On January 27, 2022, the Astros announced that Puhl was to be inducted into the Houston Astros Hall of Fame. In March 2022, Puhl announced he would retire from coaching the Jaguars at the end of the 2022 season.

On October 28, 2022 Puhl was selected to throw the ceremonial first pitch at game one of the 2022 World Series between Houston and Philadelphia.

In retirement, Puhl entered the world of wealth management in Houston, partnering with former Astros teammate Craig Reynolds. He is currently a Senior Financial Advisor at CORDA Investment Management.

=== Head coaching record ===
Record table
Season	Team	Overall	Conference	Standing	Postseason
UHV Jaguars (Independent) (2008–2015)
2008	UHV	28–5			
2009	UHV	34–17			NAIA Opening Round
2010	UHV	33–22			NAIA Opening Round
2011	UHV	30–25			
2012	UHV	20–29			
2013	UHV	21–22			
2014	UHV	25–33			NAIA Opening Round
2015	UHV	28–21			
UHV Jaguars (Red River Athletic Conference) (2016–2022)
2016	UHV	23–26	20–10	2nd	
2017	UHV	21–24	14–14	7th	
2018	UHV	14–31	10–17	T–7th	
2019	UHV	18–30	11–16	T–7th	
2020	UHV	3–11	2–4		Season canceled due to COVID-19
2021	UHV	11–31	7–17	6th	
2022	UHV	24–26	15–18	8th	
UHV:		333–353 (.485)	79–96 (.451)		
Total:		333–353 (.485)	79–96 (.451)		
National champion Postseason invitational champion Conference regular season champion Conference regular season and conference tournament champion Division regular season champion Division regular season and conference tournament champion Conference tournament champion

== See also ==
- List of Major League Baseball players from Canada
- UHV Jaguars
