= Dave Smith (pitcher, born 1955) =

American baseball player (1955–2008)

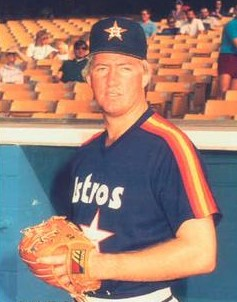
- Pitcher
- Born: January 21, 1955; Richmond, California, U.S.
- Died: December 17, 2008 (aged 53); San Diego, California, U.S.
- Batted: Right Threw: Right

MLB debut
- April 11, 1980, for the Houston Astros

Last MLB appearance
- June 8, 1992, for the Chicago Cubs

MLB statistics
- Win–loss record: 53–53
- Earned run average: 2.67
- Strikeouts: 548
- Saves: 216
- Stats at Baseball Reference

Teams
- Houston Astros (1980–1990); Chicago Cubs (1991–1992)

Career highlights and awards
- 2× All-Star (1986, 1990)

David Stanley Smith (January 21, 1955 – December 17, 2008) was an American Major League Baseball relief pitcher, primarily for the Houston Astros, for whom he pitched from 1980 to 1990. He also pitched for the Chicago Cubs.

== Early life ==
Smith was born in Richmond, California, and attended San Diego State University. He was drafted in the eighth round (169th overall) of the 1976 Major League Baseball draft. He was signed by scout Bob Cluck.

== Baseball career ==
1982 photocard of Smith for Houston Astros

Smith made his Major League debut on April 11, 1980, against the Los Angeles Dodgers. Sent in for the top of the eighth inning, Smith allowed two walks and a hit but did not allow a run. The Astros rallied in the bottom of the inning for five runs to victory, as Smith earned his first win. Smith appeared in 57 games that year while pitching 102.2 innings (a career high), collecting ten saves while having a 7–5 record with a 1.93 ERA. He struck out 85 batters while walking 32 of them, and he received votes in the Rookie of the Year balloting, finishing fifth. That year, the Astros reached the postseason for the first time in franchise history. Smith appeared in three games of the 1980 National League Championship Series. In Game 2, he pitched to seven batters in the seventh and eighth innings, allowing one run to score while the Astros won 7–4. In Game 3, he was tasked to pitch the eleventh inning of a scoreless tie. He allowed one hit and a walk before the Astros rallied in the bottom of the inning for a walk-off victory. This set the stage for a pivotal Game 4, in which an Astros win would have advanced them to the World Series. In the top of the eighth inning, he was sent to replace Vern Ruhle, who had seen his shutout end on a Pete Rose single. Facing Mike Schmidt on a full count, Smith allowed a single that scored Lonnie Smith to tie the game. Smith was taken out for Joe Sambito, but the Phillies tacked on another run to take the lead. While the Astros rallied to force it into extra innings, the Phillies won the game in the tenth inning (with three hits off Sambito) and won the series the next day.

The following year, Smith pitched in 42 games with 75 innings pitched while collecting eight saves with 52 strikeouts and 23 walks and a 2.76 ERA. The Astros returned to the postseason that year and met the Los Angeles Dodgers in the 1981 National League Division Series. Smith pitched the ninth and tenth inning of Game 1, a game that ended with an 11th inning victory for Houston. Smith pitched to two batters of the decisive Game 5 and allowed one run on a hit in the 4–0 loss. Smith started one game in his career, doing so on June 25, 1982, against the Dodgers. He lasted two innings while allowing four hits and three runs.

Smith served as the team's primary closer after the 1984 season; he had saved forty games in his first five seasons, but he saved 159 games over the next six seasons for the Astros. In 1986, Smith pitched 56 innings with 54 appearances in games, which resulted in 33 saves with a 2.73 ERA and a 4–7 record while striking out 46 batters with 22 walks. He was named to the All-Star Game that year. Smith and the Astros returned to the postseason that season. He pitched Game 3 and Game 6 of the 1986 National League Championship Series against the New York Mets. In Game 3, he relieved Charlie Kerfeld in the ninth inning of a 5–4 lead for Houston. He gave up a leadoff bunt single by Wally Backman, who the Astros felt stepped way out of the basepaths. One out later, Lenny Dykstra, hit a deep shot to right field on a forkball that went for a home run to win the game for the Mets. Game 6 would later be referred to as one of the most memorable postseason games in history. Smith was sent to pitch the ninth inning to take over for Bob Knepper, who had allowed two runs to score on three hits. With a 3–2 lead and a runner on base with one out, Smith walked two batters to load the bases. Ray Knight then tied the game with a sacrifice fly deep to right field. Smith pitched the tenth inning and allowed no hits, but the Astros went on to lose in the sixteenth inning. In 1989, Smith established an Astros club record by converting each of the first 21 save opportunities to start the season. This record stood until 2025, when Josh Hader extended his streak to 22.

Smith pitched his final year with the Astros in 1990. He made the All-Star team that season, pitching with a 2.39 ERA in 49 games and 60.1 innings while collecting 23 saves with fifty strikeouts and twenty walks to go with a 6–6 record. Smith left the Astros following the 1990 season, signing with the Chicago Cubs ten days after being granted free agency. He pitched in 35 games for 33 innings pitched for a 6.00 ERA, striking out sixteen batters with nineteen walks while going 0–6 with seventeen saves. The following year was his last in the majors, as he pitched in eleven games before being placed on the disabled list in June. He had a 2.51 ERA in 14.1 innings and eleven games pitched. In his last game on June 8 against the St. Louis Cardinals, he went 1.2 innings and allowed two runs on four hits. He underwent career-ending elbow surgery in Chicago in September 1992. His career win-loss record was 53-53. He holds the Astros record for games pitched (586) and home runs per nine innings (0.331). His 2.53 ERA is third-best in Astros history. His 199 saves was a team record until Billy Wagner passed him. Smith had 216 total saves (with 52 blown opportunities).

== Personal life ==
Smith was married twice and had three children in total. After his playing career ended, he worked under the minor league system for the San Diego Padres from 1994 to 1998 before being promoted to the major league staff in 1999, where he coached until 2001; in that year, he undertook an alcohol rehabilitation program and missed a month of the season before resigning in June. He was one of the directors of The San Diego School of Baseball for nearly 30 years. Smith died of a heart attack on December 17, 2008, in San Diego, California.

== See also ==
- List of Houston Astros team records
