= 1980 Major League Baseball postseason =

1980 Major League Baseball playoffs

Tournament details
- Dates: October 7–21, 1980
- Teams: 4

Final positions
- Champions: Philadelphia Phillies (1st title)
- Runners-up: Kansas City Royals

Tournament statistics
- Games played: 14
- Attendance: 731,285 (52,235 per game)
- Most HRs: Willie Aikens (KC) (4)
- Most SBs: Larry Bowa (PHI) (4)
- Most Ks (as pitcher): Steve Carlton (PHI) (23)

Awards
- MVP: Mike Schmidt (PHI)

The 1980 Major League Baseball postseason was the playoff tournament of Major League Baseball for the 1980 season. The winners of each division advance to the postseason and face each other in a League Championship Series to determine the pennant winners that face each other in the World Series.

In the American League, both the New York Yankees and Kansas City Royals were making their fourth postseason appearance in the past five seasons.

In the National League, the Philadelphia Phillies also returned for the fourth time in the past five seasons, and the Houston Astros made their first postseason appearance in franchise history.

All four teams would return during the expanded 1981 postseason, as due to the lockout-shortened season, the season was split in half and the division leaders during each half qualified for the postseason. They would also appear in the expanded 2024 postseason.

The playoffs began on October 7, 1980, and concluded on October 21, 1980, with the Phillies defeating the Royals in six games in the 1980 World Series. This was the first championship in franchise history for the Phillies.

== Playoff seeds ==
American League Teams National League Teams

The following teams qualified for the postseason:

=== American League ===
- New York Yankees – 103–59, AL East champions
- Kansas City Royals – 97–65, AL West champions

=== National League ===
- Philadelphia Phillies – 91–71, NL East champions
- Houston Astros – 93–70, NL West champions

== Playoff bracket ==
League Championship Series (ALCS, NLCS)
East	NY Yankees	0
West	Kansas City	3
East	Philadelphia	3
West	Houston	2

World Series
AL	Kansas City	2
NL	Philadelphia	4

== American League Championship Series ==
=== New York Yankees vs. Kansas City Royals ===
Kansas City won the series, 3–0.

Game	Date	Score	Location	Time	Attendance
1	October 8	New York Yankees – 2, Kansas City Royals – 7	Royals Stadium	3:00	42,598
2	October 9	New York Yankees – 2, Kansas City Royals – 3	Royals Stadium	2:51	42,633
3	October 10	Kansas City Royals – 4, New York Yankees – 2	Yankee Stadium	2:59	56,588

This was the fourth meeting between these two teams in the ALCS in the past five years. After three previous failed attempts, the Royals finally broke through, sweeping the Yankees to advance to the World Series for the first time in franchise history (in the process denying a rematch of the 1950 World Series between the Yankees and Phillies).

Kansas City ace Larry Gura outdueled Ron Guidry as the Royals blew out the Yankees in Game 1. In Game 2, the Royals jumped out to an early lead and managed to hold it, as they fended off a late rally by the Yankees in the top of the eighth to win by a 3–2 score and go up 2–0 in the series headed to the Bronx. In Game 3, the Yankees held a 2–1 lead after six innings, but couldn't hold it as George Brett hit a three-run home run off Yankees' relief pitcher Goose Gossage, putting the Royals ahead for good. The Royals clinched the pennant with a one-two-three ninth inning, exacting long-awaited revenge on the team that eliminated them from the postseason three consecutive times. The Yankees became the fifth 100+ win team to be swept in the postseason and the first since the 1976 Philadelphia Phillies.

The Royals returned to the ALCS in 1984, but were swept by the eventual World Series champion Detroit Tigers. Their next pennant came in 1985 against the Toronto Blue Jays in seven games after trailing 3–1 in the series, en route to their first World Series title.

The Yankees returned to the ALCS the next year and swept the Oakland Athletics before falling in the World Series. This was the last time the Yankees were swept in the ALCS until 2012.

As of 2026, this is the only time the Royals defeated the Yankees in the postseason. Both teams would meet again 44 years later in the ALDS, which was won by the Yankees before they fell in the World Series.

== National League Championship Series ==
=== Houston Astros vs. Philadelphia Phillies ===
Philadelphia won the series, 3–2.

Game	Date	Score	Location	Time	Attendance
1	October 7	Houston Astros – 1, Philadelphia Phillies – 3	Veterans Stadium	2:35	65,277
2	October 8	Houston Astros – 7, Philadelphia Phillies – 4 (10)	Veterans Stadium	3:34	65,476
3	October 10	Philadelphia Phillies – 0, Houston Astros – 1 (11)	Astrodome	3:22	44,443
4	October 11	Philadelphia Phillies – 5, Houston Astros – 3 (10)	Astrodome	3:55	44,952
5	October 12	Philadelphia Phillies – 8, Houston Astros – 7 (10)	Astrodome	3:38	44,802

This was the first postseason meeting between the Astros and Phillies, as well as the first postseason series ever played in the state of Texas. This edition of the NLCS is remembered as the closest and most grueling playoff series in MLB history. The series went to its five-game limit, with the final four games going into extra innings. The Phillies prevailed in five tightly contested games to return to the World Series for the first time since 1950.

Game 1 was the only game of the series to not go into extra innings - the Astros held a 1–0 lead going into the bottom of the sixth, until Greg Luzinski hit a two-run home run to put the Phillies ahead for good (Luzinski's home run was the only one of this series).

Game 2 was an offensive slugfest which went into extra innings - in the top of the tenth, the Astros scored four runs with three hits - an RBI single by José Cruz, a run-scoring groundout by César Cedeño, and a two-run triple by Dave Bergman. The Phillies got an unearned run in the bottom of the inning on an error by Craig Reynolds at shortstop, but Astros reliever Joaquín Andújar came in and held on for the save to tie the series at 1–1 headed to Houston.

Game 3 was the first postseason game played in Texas, and it was a long and grueling pitchers' duel between both teams’ pitching staffs. Houston's Joe Niekro pitched ten shutout innings, but it wasn't enough for him to get the win, which went to Astros relief pitcher Dave Smith. The Astros won 1–0 in the bottom of the eleventh as Denny Walling hit a sacrifice fly to drive in Joe Morgan, and were now one win away from their first ever World Series appearance.

Game 4 went into extra innings yet again, and the Phillies would even the series as Luzinski entered as a pinch-hitter and doubled home Pete Rose with the go-ahead run on a close play at the plate, with Rose running over Astros catcher Bruce Bochy. Manny Trillo then singled home Luzinski with an insurance tally.

Game 5 was the most notable of the series. The Astros held a 5–2 lead after seven innings and were six outs away from clinching the pennant. However, in the top of the eighth, the Phillies loaded the bases with nobody out on three straight singles, including an infield hit by Bob Boone and a bunt single by Greg Gross. Two runs came in on a walk to Rose and a ground-out by Keith Moreland. An RBI single by Del Unser tied the game at 5, and then Trillo put the Phillies ahead with a two-run triple. The Astros tied the game in the bottom of the eighth, with Rafael Landestoy and Cruz each singling in a run. The game went scoreless through the ninth, and went into extra innings for the fourth straight time. In the top of the tenth, the Phillies got doubles from Unser and Garry Maddox in the tenth to take the lead for good. Dick Ruthven retired the Astros in order in the bottom of the tenth the last out being a soft liner to Maddox, clinching the pennant for the Phillies. This was the first playoff series win in franchise history for the Phillies.

This was the first of three consecutive losses in the NLCS for the Astros. They returned to the NLCS in 1986, but they lost to the eventual World Series champion New York Mets in six games. They also made the NLCS in 2004, but fell to the St. Louis Cardinals in seven games after being ten outs away from the pennant in Game 7. The Astros would win their first pennant in 2005 over the Cardinals in six games before coming up short in the World Series, which would be their only one as a National League member.

The Phillies would win their next pennant in three years later over the Los Angeles Dodgers in four games before falling in the World Series.

The Astros and Phillies would meet again 42 years later in the 2022 World Series which the Astros, now members of the American League, won in six games.

== 1980 World Series ==
=== Kansas City Royals (AL) vs. Philadelphia Phillies (NL) ===
Philadelphia won the series, 4–2.

Game	Date	Score	Location	Time	Attendance
1	October 14	Kansas City Royals – 6, Philadelphia Phillies – 7	Veterans Stadium	3:01	65,791
2	October 15	Kansas City Royals – 4, Philadelphia Phillies – 6	Veterans Stadium	3:01	65,775
3	October 17	Philadelphia Phillies – 3, Kansas City Royals – 4 (10)	Royals Stadium	3:19	42,380
4	October 18	Philadelphia Phillies – 3, Kansas City Royals – 5	Royals Stadium	2:37	42,363
5	October 19	Philadelphia Phillies – 4, Kansas City Royals – 3	Royals Stadium	2:51	42,369
6	October 21	Kansas City Royals – 1, Philadelphia Phillies – 4	Veterans Stadium	3:00	65,838

This was the first edition of the World Series since 1920 to feature two teams that had not won a championship before, and was the last to do so until 2026. The Phillies defeated the Royals in six games to win their first World Series title in franchise history, ending what was the longest championship drought in all four major North American leagues.

Game 1 was an offensive slugfest which the Phillies won 7–6 - it marked the first time that the Phillies won a World Series game since Game 1 of the 1915 World Series against the Boston Red Sox. The Phillies rallied late to take Game 2 after scoring four unanswered runs in the bottom of the eighth to take a 2–0 series lead headed to Kansas City. The Royals got on the board in Game 3, as Willie Aikens drove in Willie Wilson with an RBI single in the bottom of the tenth. In Game 4, the Royals jumped out to an early 5–1 lead and did not relinquish it, as closer Dan Quisenberry held off a potential rally by the Phillies to even the series at two. In Game 5, the Royals held a 3–2 lead after eight innings, but the Phillies managed to come back. Del Unser drove in Mike Schmidt with an RBI double to tie the game, and then Manny Trillo drove in the go-ahead run with a line shot that ricocheted off Quisenberry for an infield hit, which was almost thrown out by George Brett. Phillies' closer Tug McGraw held the Royals' offense at bay in the bottom of the ninth, giving the Phillies a 3–2 lead headed back home. The Phillies clinched the title in Game 6, as they jumped out to an early lead and did not relinquish it, winning 4–1 to secure their first title in franchise history. This would ultimately be Pete Rose’s last World Series championship.

The Phillies became the last of the "Original Sixteen" franchises to win a World Series title (although the St. Louis Browns never won a Series in St. Louis, waiting until 1966, twelve years after becoming the Baltimore Orioles). It was the first time the city of Philadelphia won a World Series since the Athletics did so in 1930, as well as the second straight World Series title won by a team from Pennsylvania after the Pittsburgh Pirates did so the previous year. Along with the Pittsburgh Steelers winning Super Bowl XIV earlier in the year, the state of Pennsylvania had both Super Bowl and World Series champions in the same season or calendar year once again. The Phillies returned to the World Series three years later, but lost to the Baltimore Orioles in five games. They would win their next and most recent championship in 2008 over the Tampa Bay Rays in five games to end a 28-year championship drought.

The Royals would return to the World Series in 1985, where they defeated their in-state rival in the St. Louis Cardinals in seven games after trailing 3–1 in the series and being two outs away from elimination in Game 6.

== Broadcasting ==
ABC televised both LCS nationally in the United States. Each team's local broadcaster also televised coverage of LCS games. NBC aired the World Series.
