= Gordie Pladson =

Canadian baseball player (born 1956)

- Pitcher
- Born: July 31, 1956 (age 69); New Westminster, British Columbia, Canada
- Batted: Right Threw: Right

MLB debut
- September 7, 1979, for the Houston Astros

Last MLB appearance
- April 20, 1982, for the Houston Astros

MLB statistics
- Win–loss record: 0–4
- Earned run average: 6.04
- Strikeouts: 18
- Stats at Baseball Reference

Teams
- Houston Astros (1979–1982)

Gordon Cecil Pladson (born July 31, 1956) is a Canadian former professional baseball pitcher. He played in Major League Baseball (MLB) in parts of four seasons for the Houston Astros, from 1979 until 1982.

Pladson grew up in Delta, British Columbia, Canada but did not play hockey in his youth. After baseball, his second sport was basketball which he played at Douglas College after signing a professional baseball contract with the Astros at 16 years old while a grade 11 student at North Delta Secondary School. Seven years after signing with the Astros, he made his Major League debut against the San Francisco Giants on September 7, 1979, striking out one batter in an inning of relief.
