= John Martin (baseball) =

American baseball player (born 1956)

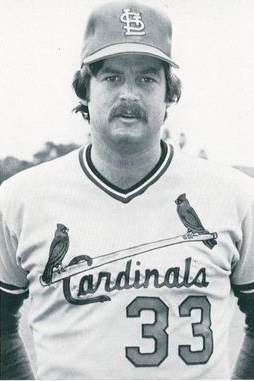
- Pitcher
- Born: April 11, 1956 (age 70); Wyandotte, Michigan, U.S.
- Batted: Switch Threw: Left

MLB debut
- August 27, 1980, for the St. Louis Cardinals

Last MLB appearance
- October 2, 1983, for the Detroit Tigers

MLB statistics
- Win–loss record: 17–14
- Earned run average: 3.94
- Strikeouts: 120
- Stats at Baseball Reference

Teams
- St. Louis Cardinals (1980–1983); Detroit Tigers (1983)

Career highlights and awards
- World Series champion (1982)

John Robert Martin (born April 11, 1956) is an American former Major League Baseball pitcher.

Martin attended Eastern Michigan University (EMU). He was a member of the 1976 and 1977 Mid-American Conference (MAC) Championship EMU teams. Martin is also a member of the EMU Hall of Fame.

The Detroit Tigers drafted Martin in the 27th round of the 1978 Major League Baseball draft. The Tigers traded him to the St. Louis Cardinals with Al Greene for Jim Lentine on June 2, 1980.

After appearing in 9 games, starting 5, and winning 2 in his rookie year of 1980, with the St. Louis Cardinals, Martin recorded his best year in 1981, recording 8 wins against 5 losses, four complete games, and a 3.42 earned run average (ERA). In 1982, after a subpar start with a sore arm, he only started in 7 games, and finished the season mostly out of the bullpen (4–5, 4.23 ERA). Martin adjusted to pitching in relief and bounced back with a 3–1 record and 4.18 ERA. The Cardinals sold him to the Detroit Tigers on August 4, 1983. For the Tigers, Martin appeared in 15 games and had a 7.43 ERA.
