= Chris Bourjos =

American baseball player (born 1954)

- Outfielder
- Born: October 16, 1954 (age 71); Chicago, Illinois, U.S.
- Batted: Right Threw: Right

MLB debut
- August 31, 1980, for the San Francisco Giants

Last MLB appearance
- October 5, 1980, for the San Francisco Giants

MLB statistics
- Batting average: .227
- Home runs: 1
- Runs batted in: 2
- Stats at Baseball Reference

Teams
- San Francisco Giants (1980)

Christopher Bourjos (born October 16, 1954) is an American former professional baseball player who played part of one season for the San Francisco Giants of Major League Baseball. He has worked as an Arizona-based scout.

== Playing career ==
Bourjos attended Northern Illinois University, where he played baseball for the Huskies in 1975 and 1976. He was signed as an amateur free agent by the Giants on March 26, 1977, and was called up by the Giants late in the 1980 season after playing four years in the minor leagues.

Bourjos was traded by the Giants with Bob Knepper to the Houston Astros in exchange for Enos Cabell December 8, 1980, and by the Astros with cash to the Baltimore Orioles in exchange for Kiko Garcia April 1, 1981, but didn't play for either the Astros or Orioles. He returned to the minor leagues, his last season being with Portland (PCL) in 1983.

== Scouting career ==
After his retirement as an active player, Bourjos served as a baseball scout with the Toronto Blue Jays from 1984 to 2002. He had a major role in the ballclub's selection of Roy Halladay with the 17th overall pick in the 1995 MLB draft. He joined the Milwaukee Brewers in a similar capacity on November 7, 2003. He scouted for the Baltimore Orioles in 2010 and 2011, joining the San Diego Padres in 2012.

== Personal ==
He is a nephew of former Cleveland Indians catcher Otto Denning and the father of Peter Bourjos, former MLB outfielder.
