= Enos Cabell =

American baseball player (born 1949)

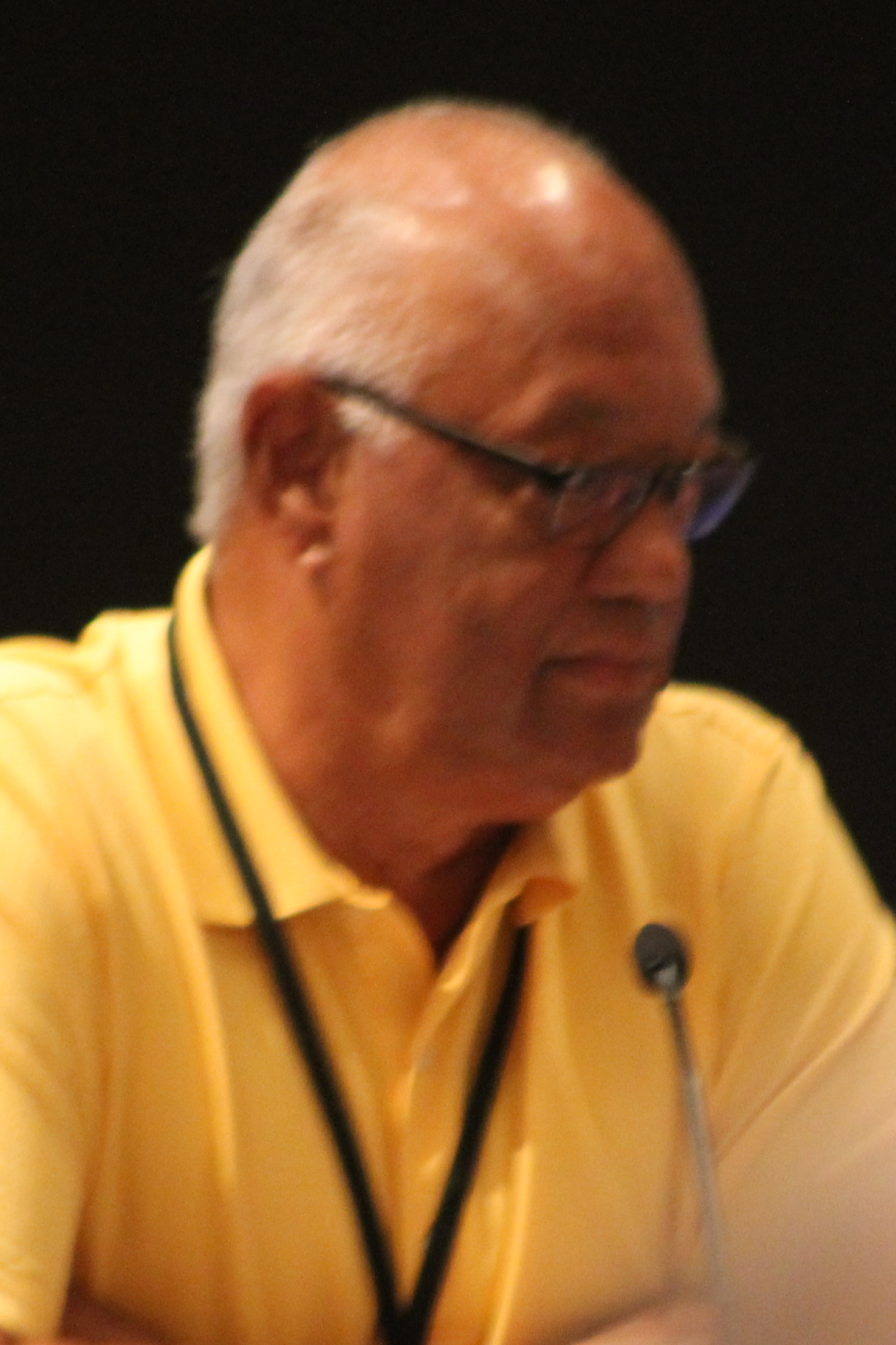
- Cabell in 2014
- Third baseman / First baseman
- Born: October 8, 1949 (age 76); Fort Riley, Kansas, U.S.
- Batted: Right Threw: Right

MLB debut
- September 17, 1972, for the Baltimore Orioles

Last MLB appearance
- September 29, 1986, for the Los Angeles Dodgers

MLB statistics
- Batting average: .277
- Home runs: 60
- Runs batted in: 596
- Stats at Baseball Reference

Teams
- Baltimore Orioles (1972–1974); Houston Astros (1975–1980); San Francisco Giants (1981); Detroit Tigers (1982–1983); Houston Astros (1984–1985); Los Angeles Dodgers (1985–1986)

Enos Milton Cabell (pronounced ca-BELL), (born October 8, 1949) is an American former professional baseball player. He played in Major League Baseball (MLB) as a first baseman and third baseman from 1972 to 1986, most prominently as a member of the Houston Astros team that won the franchise's first National League Western Division title and postseason berth in 1980. He also played for the Baltimore Orioles, San Francisco Giants, Detroit Tigers, and Los Angeles Dodgers. After his playing career, Cabell served as a special assistant to the general manager of the Houston Astros.

== Biography ==
Cabell was born in Fort Riley, Kansas, to Enos Cabell Sr. and Naomi Cabell. He graduated from Gardena High School in Gardena, California. He played college baseball at Los Angeles Harbor College. Cabell was signed by the Baltimore Orioles as an amateur free agent in 1968.

He played in Venezuelan winter league for Tigres de Aragua in season 1971-1972. He was traded along with Rob Andrews from the Orioles to the Astros for Lee May and Jay Schlueter at the Winter Meetings on December 3, 1974. The Baseball Writers' Association of America named Cabell the Houston Astros' Most Valuable Player in 1978. On December 8, 1980, Cabell was then traded to San Francisco for pitcher Bob Knepper and outfielder Chris Bourjos.

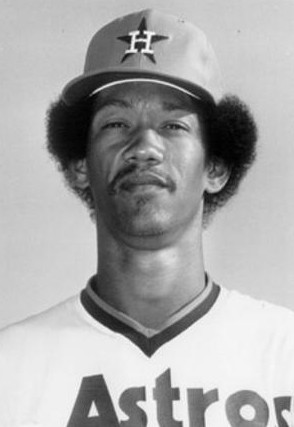
Cabell in 1976

On February 28, 1986, Cabell and six others were suspended for the entire season for admitting during the Pittsburgh drug trials that they were involved in cocaine abuse. The suspensions for all seven were avoided after agreeing to large anti-drug donations and community service.

He played MLB for 15 seasons, despite the distinction of being singled out by Bill James in his 1983 Baseball Abstract as a player who "can't play baseball." Currently, he serves as a special assistant to Astros general manager James Click.

== Career statistics ==
In 1,688 games over 15 seasons, Cabell compiled a .277 batting average (1,647–for–5,952) with 753 runs, 263 doubles, 56 triples, 60 home runs, 596 RBI, 238 stolen bases, 259 base on balls, 691 strikeouts, .308 on-base percentage, and .370 slugging percentage. Defensively, he recorded a .977 fielding percentage. In the postseason, he batted .184 (7–for–38) in 13 league championship games.

== Trademark lawsuit ==
In December 2008, Tennessee Titans quarterback Vince Young filed suit against Cabell and two others for applying for a trademark to use Young's initials and the "Invincible" nickname to sell products without Young's permission in 2006. The suit claimed that their use of Young's name damaged endorsement deals for Young; he asked the court to give him the exclusive rights to use the initials and nickname. Cabell denied any wrongdoing.

== See also ==
- Houston Astros award winners and league leaders
- List of Major League Baseball career stolen bases leaders
