= Vern Ruhle =

American baseball player (1951–2007)

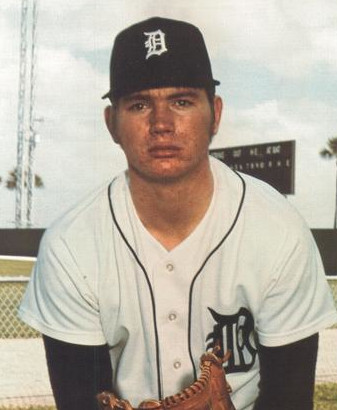
- Ruhle in 1975
- Pitcher
- Born: January 25, 1951; Coleman, Michigan, U.S.
- Died: January 20, 2007 (aged 55); Houston, Texas, U.S.
- Batted: Right Threw: Right

MLB debut
- September 9, 1974, for the Detroit Tigers

Last MLB appearance
- October 4, 1986, for the California Angels

MLB statistics
- Win–loss record: 67–88
- Earned run average: 3.73
- Strikeouts: 582
- Stats at Baseball Reference

Teams
- As player: Detroit Tigers (1974–1977); Houston Astros (1978–1984); Cleveland Indians (1985); California Angels (1986); As coach: Houston Astros (1997–2000); Philadelphia Phillies (2001–2002); New York Mets (2003); Cincinnati Reds (2005–2006)

Vernon Gerald Ruhle (/ˈruːl/ ROOL; January 25, 1951 – January 20, 2007) was an American professional baseball right-handed pitcher and coach, who played in Major League Baseball (MLB), primarily for the Detroit Tigers and Houston Astros for 13 seasons, from 1974 to 1986.

== Early life ==
Ruhle was born in Coleman, Michigan, and attended Olivet College, where he was a member of the Kappa Sigma Alpha fraternity. He was selected by the Detroit Tigers in the 17th round of the 1972 Major League Baseball draft.

== Baseball career ==
Ruhle made his debut with Detroit, in September 1974. He joined the Tigers' starting rotation the following year, posting a record of 11 wins and 12 losses, on a team that finished 57–102. On August 12, Ruhle was presented with his university degree from Olivet College, during a pre-game ceremony at Tiger Stadium.

Ruhle gave up a third-inning single to Hank Aaron on May 1, 1975, driving in Sixto Lezcano for Aaron's record-breaking 2,210th run batted in (RBI), to surpass Babe Ruth's record of 2,209. On May 12, 1975, Ruhle allowed 12 baserunners in his 7 1/3 innings to earn a win. That night, the Royals left a record-tying 15 men on base, without scoring, in a 5–0 loss to the Tigers. The 15 runners left-on-base (LOB) in a shutout had occurred three times before‚ the most recent on August 1‚ 1941. The mark was finally eclipsed by the St. Louis Cardinals in 1994. In a game in Detroit on September 21, 1975, a pitch from Ruhle struck Boston Red Sox batter Jim Rice in the hand, breaking a bone and ending his season, making Rice unavailable as Boston advanced to, and ultimately lost, the 1975 World Series. After a 9–12 season in 1976, Ruhle finished 1977 with a 5.70 earned run average (ERA) in only 66 innings pitched. Ruhle was released by Detroit toward the end of spring training in 1978 but was signed by the Houston Astros the following day.

Ruhle made sporadic appearances for Houston over the next two years before finishing with a 12–4 win–loss record and a 2.38 ERA in 1980, when the team won its first division title, and started Game 4 of the 1980 National League Championship Series (NLCS) against the Philadelphia Phillies. He left the game with a 2–1 lead in the eighth inning. Houston needed only one more victory to reach their first World Series, but Philadelphia came back to win, 5–3, in 10 innings and took the series after winning the decisive fifth game.

Ruhle was the center of a controversial play in his Game 4 NLCS start. With baserunners on first and second and no outs in the top of the fourth inning, Ruhle fielded a soft liner off the bat of Garry Maddox and immediately threw to first base before Manny Trillo could return, for a double play. However, Philadelphia players raced out of the dugout to argue that Ruhle had trapped the ball. During the argument, first baseman Art Howe stepped on second base, where baserunner Bake McBride had been at the start of the play, and claimed a triple play. After 20 minutes, Ruhle's fielding of the ball was ruled a catch, but as the third out was made after time had been called, the play stood as a double play. Ruhle had a no-decision as the Astros lost in the tenth inning. He later started in Game Four of the 1981 National League Division Series against the Los Angeles Dodgers, losing a complete game 2–1 pitchers' duel with Fernando Valenzuela, as Houston again wasted a 2–1 series advantage and lost in five games.

Ruhle continued to start less regularly before primarily shifting to relief work in 1983–1984. He signed with the Cleveland Indians as a free agent, after the 1984 season, and made 16 starts and 26 relief appearances for the club in 1985. He joined the California Angels in June 1986 and closed his career that year working mainly out of the bullpen. His last appearance was in Game 4 of the 1986 American League Championship Series against the Boston Red Sox, entering with the Angels trailing 1–0 with two out in the seventh inning; he surrendered two more runs in the eighth inning, but the Angels won in 11 innings after tying the game with three runs in the ninth.

In a 13-year major league career, Ruhle posted a record of 67–88 with 582 strikeouts and a 3.73 ERA in 327 games.

Ruhle later became a pitching coach for the Astros, Phillies, New York Mets, and finally the Cincinnati Reds, in 9 of 10 consecutive seasons, from 1997 to 2006.

== Death ==
Ruhle died in Houston, after a yearlong battle with multiple myeloma, on January 20, 2007. He was survived by his wife and two children.

Preceded by Brent Strom	Houston Astros pitching coach 1997–2000	Succeeded by Burt Hooton
Preceded by Galen Cisco	Philadelphia Phillies pitching coach 2001–2002	Succeeded by Joe Kerrigan
Preceded by Charlie Hough	New York Mets pitching coach 2003	Succeeded by Rick Peterson
Preceded by Don Gullett	Cincinnati Reds pitching coach 2005–2006	Succeeded by Dick Pole
