= Bob Knepper =

American baseball player (born 1954)

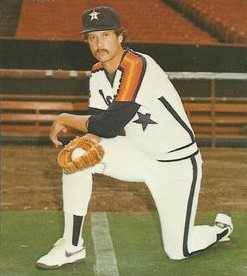
- Pitcher
- Born: May 25, 1954 (age 72); Akron, Ohio, U.S.
- Batted: Left Threw: Left

MLB debut
- September 10, 1976, for the San Francisco Giants

Last MLB appearance
- June 24, 1990, for the San Francisco Giants

MLB statistics
- Win–loss record: 146–155
- Earned run average: 3.68
- Strikeouts: 1,473
- Stats at Baseball Reference

Teams
- San Francisco Giants (1976–1980); Houston Astros (1981–1989); San Francisco Giants (1989–1990)

Career highlights and awards
- 2× All-Star (1981, 1988)

Robert Wesley Knepper (born May 25, 1954) is an American former Major League Baseball pitcher. From 1976 to 1990, he pitched 15 seasons for the San Francisco Giants and Houston Astros, earning two All-Star appearances as well as the 1981 NL Comeback Player of the Year award. He gained notoriety with his 1988 remarks disparaging umpire Pam Postema, the National Organization for Women, and gay people.

== Biography ==
Born in Akron, Ohio, his family moved to the Napa Valley when he was nine years old, where he attended Calistoga High School.

=== Career ===
In the September 1978 issue of Sport, Jay Stuller wrote an extraordinarily positive article on Knepper, entitled, "You Can't Compare Him To Koufax...Yet". When Knepper's career failed to reach that standard, critics would later refer to that article and say, "You Can't Compare Him to Koufax...Ever."

On December 8, 1980, Knepper was traded from the Giants along with Chris Bourjos to the Astros for Enos Cabell. Knepper welcomed the trade, perceiving the Astros' clubhouse as strongly spiritual, and calling the Bay Area “such a liberal, almost anti-Christian society." He won The Sporting News Comeback Player of the Year Award in 1981. He was voted to the National League All-Star team twice (1981 and 1988). He led the National League in shutouts in 1978, with six, and in 1986, with five. He also led the league in hit batsmen in 1980, with eight, and losses in 1987, with 17.

Knepper played in three postseason games, all with the Astros. In the 1981 National League Division Series against the Los Angeles Dodgers, he started Game 3 with the Astros needing just one victory to advance. However, Knepper allowed three runs in five innings and Los Angeles won 6-1 before rallying to win the series a couple of days later. In the 1986 National League Championship Series, Knepper started Game 3 and Game 6 against the New York Mets. The Mets tabbed Knepper for four runs (three earned) in seven innings before winning later 6-5. Trailing three games to two in the Series, the Astros were hopeful of forcing a Game 7 with star Mike Scott lined up to pitch. Knepper had done eight scoreless innings with the Astros up 3-0 before running into trouble in the ninth inning. He allowed a leadoff triple to Lenny Dykstra before a Mookie Wilson single scored a run. Keith Hernandez later hit a double to center to make it 3-2 with one out, which forced Knepper out of the game. The Mets and Astros would battle it out until the 16th inning before New York won the game and series.

Knepper started 413 games in the majors, appearing as a reliever only 32 times. However, on September 21, 1982, he did pick up his one and only major league save. Knepper pitched the final 2 2/3 innings to preserve a 5-3 Astros victory over the Braves. He saved the game for Astros starting pitcher Vern Ruhle.

By July 1989, Knepper was struggling with a 4-10 win–loss record and a 5.89 ERA. The Astros released him after he refused a demotion to the minor leagues, and was signed by the San Francisco Giants a few days later. He pitched the rest of the regular season with San Francisco, but did not make their postseason roster. The Giants waived Knepper in June 1990.

=== Anti-women remarks ===
During a 1988 season that was one of the best of his career, Knepper disparaged Pam Postema, a female Triple-A umpire officiating a Major League spring training game, citing his Christian beliefs:

I just don’t think a woman should be an umpire. There are certain things a woman shouldn’t be and an umpire is one of them. It’s a physical thing. God created women to be feminine. I don’t think they should be competing with men. It has nothing to do with her ability. I don’t think women should be in any position of leadership. I don’t think they should be presidents or politicians. I think women were created not in an inferior position, but in a role of submission to men. You can be a woman umpire if you want, but that doesn’t mean it’s right. You can be a homosexual if you want, but that doesn’t mean that’s right either."

He also berated the National Organization for Women, saying, "They are a bunch of lesbians. Their focus has nothing to do with women's rights. It has everything to do with women wanting to be men."

== See also ==
- Houston Astros award winners and league leaders
- List of Major League Baseball annual shutout leaders
