= Joe Sambito =

American baseball player (born 1952)

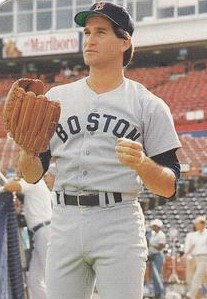
- Pitcher
- Born: June 28, 1952 (age 74); Brooklyn, New York, U.S.
- Batted: Left Threw: Left

MLB debut
- July 20, 1976, for the Houston Astros

Last MLB appearance
- October 3, 1987, for the Boston Red Sox

MLB statistics
- Win–loss record: 37–38
- Earned run average: 3.03
- Strikeouts: 489
- Saves: 84
- Stats at Baseball Reference

Teams
- Houston Astros (1976–1984); New York Mets (1985); Boston Red Sox (1986–1987)

Career highlights and awards
- All-Star (1979)

Joseph Charles Sambito (born June 28, 1952) is an American former pitcher in Major League Baseball who played for the Houston Astros (1976–1982, 1984), New York Mets (1985) and Boston Red Sox (1986–1987). He batted and threw left-handed.

== Early life ==
He graduated from Bethpage High School in Bethpage, New York in 1970. He attended Adelphi University in Garden City, New York on scholarship to play both baseball, as a pitcher, and football, as a wide receiver.

Sambito was an NCAA baseball All-American in 1973. The same year, he was drafted in the 17th round of the Major League Baseball draft by the Houston Astros. A fastball and slider specialist, Sambito was a starter in the minors, as he led the Southern League in strikeouts at Double-A Columbus in 1975. A year later he was promoted to the Astros, where he moved into a critical left-handed relief role.

== Major league career ==
Sambito was called to the majors in July of the 1976 season. He made his first pitching appearance on July 20 in relief of Tom Griffin while facing the Pittsburgh Pirates (Griffin had managed just one out on six batters of the first inning). Sambito pitched 4 2/3 innings while allowing three runs on seven hits with two walks.

Sambito made appearances in twenty games that year, which included four starts and eight times called to finish a game. It was during the season that he had his only complete game in the majors. On August 29, he beat the St. Louis Cardinals with a four-hit performance that also served as his only shutout. On September 24, he collected his first save. He went 3–2 with 53 1/3 innings pitched on 26 strikeouts and fourteen walks. The following year he appeared in 54 games (with only one start) that resulted in seven saves in 89 innings pitched. He struck out 67 batters with 24 walks on a 5–5 record.

He made eleven saves the following year in 88 innings pitched while striking out a career high 96.

In 1979, he continued the trend with further improvement, collecting 22 saves (a career high) and a 1.78 ERA. From May 3 to July 14, Sambito pitched 40 2/3 consecutive innings without allowing an earned run. He was named to the National League All-Star team as a relief pitcher.

With runners on first and third in the bottom of the sixth inning, National League Manager, Tommy Lasorda, called on Sambito in relief for Gaylord Perry in the 1979 MLB All Star Game. Sambito was called to face pinch-hitter Reggie Jackson. Jackson grounded into a fielder's choice that resulted in Darrell Porter being thrown out at home. After an intentional walk to Roy Smalley, Sambito faced George Brett, forcing a short flyout to center field, preventing any runs from scoring. Tommy Lasorda, Gaylord Perry, Reggie Jackson, and George Brett have all been inducted into the National Baseball Hall of Fame.

He finished 1979 with a career high 91 1/3 innings pitched while striking out 83 batters with 23 walks.

In 1980, Sambito and the Astros reached the postseason. He appeared in 64 games for 90 1/3 total innings pitched. With a 2.19 ERA, he recorded 17 saves as he struck out 75 batters with 22 walks. He finished fifth in voting for the Cy Young Award.

Sambito and the Astros reached the 1980 National League Championship Series against the Philadelphia Phillies with a chance to clinch the first ever National League Pennant for the Astros and a ticket to the World Series. Sambito appeared in three of the five games of the Series. The Phillies won the series 3-2 and proceeded to the 1980 World Series.

Sambito pitched a 1.84 ERA in 49 games in 1981, receiving 10 saves in 63 2/3 innings pitched while striking out 41 batters with 22 walks. Sambito pitched in two games of the 1981 National League Division Series against the Los Angeles Dodgers. The Dodgers went on to win the series 3-2.

He started 1982 with four saves and a 0.71 ERA in 9 appearances in April, before it was discovered that bone chips had damaged the ligaments of his pitching elbow. He missed the rest of the season and all of 1983 recuperating from Tommy John Surgery.

He appeared in 32 games for the 1984 team, pitching 47 2/3 innings as a middle-man pitcher with no save chances, which resulted in a 3.02 ERA.

He was released by the Astros on April 8, 1985 and signed as a free agent with the New York Mets on April 26. He was released on August 23 after pitching in 8 games.

Sambito made the Red Sox roster out of spring training in 1986. He appeared in 53 games for 44 2/3 innings while going a perfect 12-for-12 on save opportunities. He finished the regular season with a 4.84 ERA, 30 strikeouts, and 16 walks, as he helped the Red Sox reach the World Series. Arguably his most memorable save as a Red Sox came on June 17, 1986. Holding onto a one-run lead, Sambito retired Don Mattingly and Dave Winfield with the bases loaded to close out the game.

Sambito appeared in three of the seven games of the 1986 American League Championship Series, which included a blown save in the ninth inning of Game 5, (Boston went on to win the game in the eleventh inning, and win the series three days later). Sambito appeared in two games of the 1986 World Series against the New York Mets, which included Game 7. Boston lost the game and series, 8–5. He retired in 1987 after posting a 2–6 record with 6.93 ERA. In an eleven season career, Sambito posted a 37–38 record with a 3.03 ERA and 84 saves in 461 games.

== Post career ==
Following his retirement, Sambito became a players agent and representative. Some of his clients have included Andy Pettitte, Ryan Klesko, Jeff D'Amico, John Rocker, Morgan Ensberg, and Paul Goldschmidt.

On July 28, 2013, Sambito was inducted into the inaugural class of the Bethpage High School Athletic Wall of Fame.

Sambito currently resides in Irvine, California, where he was the pitching coach for Arnold O. Beckman High School from 2021-2023.

His son, Giovanni, played baseball at the United States Air Force Academy.

As of 2026, Sambito is the only Adelphi alumnus to have played in the majors.
