= 1980 Philadelphia Phillies season =

Major League Baseball season

1980 Philadelphia Phillies
- World Series champions National League champions National League East champions
- League: National League
- Division: East
- Ballpark: Veterans Stadium
- City: Philadelphia
- Record: 91–71 (.562)
- Divisional place: 1st
- Owners: R. R. M. "Ruly" Carpenter III
- General managers: Paul Owens
- Managers: Dallas Green
- Television: WPHL-TV; PRISM
- Radio: KYW (Harry Kalas, Richie Ashburn, Andy Musser, Chris Wheeler, Tim McCarver)

The 1980 Philadelphia Phillies season was the team's 98th season in Major League Baseball (MLB) and culminated with the Phillies winning the World Series at home by defeating the Kansas City Royals in Game 6 on October 21, 1980.

The team, after being swept by the Pirates four straight in Pittsburgh on August 8-10, won 36 of their final 55 games to finish with a regular-season record of 91 wins and 71 losses, which was good enough to win the National League East title by just one game over the division rival Montreal Expos. The Phillies went on to defeat the Houston Astros in the NLCS to gain their first NL title since 1950, and then defeated the Kansas City Royals to win their first World Series championship. The 1980 Phillies became the first team in the divisional era (since 1969) to win the World Series despite having the worst record of all teams in the postseason.

The 1980 Phillies were known as "The Cardiac Kids" because of the many close games.

Beginning that year, following the lead of the Yankees of the AL, the Phillies joined cable station PRISM with game broadcasts on that station.

== Off-season ==
- December 13, 1978: Greg Gross was signed as a free agent by the team.
- December 20, 1979: Jerry Willard was signed as an amateur free agent.
- March 30, 1980: Dave Rader was traded by the Phillies to the Boston Red Sox for a player to be named later and cash. The Red Sox completed the deal by sending Stan Papi to the Phillies on May 12.

== Regular season ==
=== Season standings ===
NL East
Team	W	L	Pct.	GB	Home	Road
Philadelphia Phillies	91	71	.562	—	49‍–‍32	42‍–‍39
Montreal Expos	90	72	.556	1	51‍–‍29	39‍–‍43
Pittsburgh Pirates	83	79	.512	8	47‍–‍34	36‍–‍45
St. Louis Cardinals	74	88	.457	17	41‍–‍40	33‍–‍48
New York Mets	67	95	.414	24	38‍–‍44	29‍–‍51
Chicago Cubs	64	98	.395	27	37‍–‍44	27‍–‍54

The Phillies won the National League East on the second-to-last day of the season with a 6–4 victory over the Expos in a game played in Montreal on October 4, 1980.

=== Record vs. opponents ===
1980 National League record Sources:
Team	ATL	CHC	CIN	HOU	LAD	MON	NYM	PHI	PIT	SD	SF	STL
Atlanta	—	8–4	2–16	7–11	11–7	5–7	3–9	5–7	11–1	12–6	11–6	6–6
Chicago	4–8	—	7–5	1–11	5–7	6–12	10–8	5–13	8–10	4–8	5–7	9–9
Cincinnati	16–2	5–7	—	8–10	9–9	3–9	8–4	7–5	6–6	15–3–1	7–11	5–7
Houston	11–7	11–1	10–8	—	9–10	5–7	8–4	3–9	7–5	11–7	11–7	7–5
Los Angeles	7–11	7–5	9–9	10–9	—	11–1	7–5	6–6	6–6	9–9	13–5	7–5
Montreal	7–5	12–6	9–3	7–5	1–11	—	10–8	9–9	6–12	10–2	7–5	12–6
New York	9–3	8–10	4–8	4–8	5–7	8–10	—	6–12	10–8	1–11	3–9	9–9
Philadelphia	7-5	13–5	5–7	9–3	6–6	9–9	12–6	—	7–11	8–4	6–6	9–9
Pittsburgh	1–11	10–8	6–6	5–7	6–6	12–6	8–10	11–7	—	6–6	8–4	10–8
San Diego	6–12	8–4	3–15–1	7–11	9–9	2–10	11–1	4–8	6–6	—	10–8	7–5
San Francisco	6–11	7–5	11–7	7–11	5–13	5–7	9–3	6–6	4–8	8–10	—	7–5
St. Louis	6–6	9–9	7–5	5–7	5–7	6–12	9–9	9–9	8–10	5–7	5–7	—

== Roster ==
1980 Philadelphia Phillies
Roster
Pitchers: 40 Warren Brusstar; 50 Marty Bystrom; 32 Steve Carlton; 38 Larry Christenson; 43 Mark Davis; 35 Nino Espinosa; 39 Lerrin LaGrow; 49 Dan Larson; 47 Randy Lerch; 39 Sparky Lyle; 45 Tug McGraw; 34 Scott Munninghoff; 48 Dickie Noles; 42 Ron Reed; 44 Dick Ruthven; 33 Kevin Saucier; 41 Bob Walk	Catchers: 8 Bob Boone; 17 Don McCormack; 6 Keith Moreland; 24 Ozzie Virgil; Infielders: 16 Luis Aguayo; 15 Ramón Avilés; 10 Larry Bowa; 22 Jay Loviglio; 11 Tim McCarver; 14 Pete Rose; 20 Mike Schmidt; 9 Manny Trillo; 25 Del Unser; 18 John Vukovich	Outfielders: 30 Bob Dernier; 23 Greg Gross; 28 Orlando Isales; 19 Greg Luzinski; 31 Garry Maddox; 21 Bake McBride; 27 Lonnie Smith; 29 George Vukovich	Manager: 46 Dallas Green; Coaches: 12 Rubén Amaro (First Base); 2 Billy DeMars (Hitting); 3 Lee Elia (Third Base); 5 Mike Ryan (Bullpen); 4 Herm Starrette (Pitching); 7 Bobby Wine (Bench)

=== Opening Day Lineup ===
Opening Day Starters
#	Name	Position
14	Pete Rose	1B
21	Bake McBride	RF
31	Garry Maddox	CF
20	Mike Schmidt	3B
19	Greg Luzinski	LF
8	Bob Boone	C
10	Larry Bowa	SS
9	Manny Trillo	2B
32	Steve Carlton	P

=== Notable transactions ===
- April 7, 1980: Roger Freed was signed as a free agent by the Phillies.
- April 29, 1980: Juan Samuel was signed as an amateur free agent by the Phillies.
- June 3, 1980: 1980 Major League Baseball draft
  - Steve Jeltz was drafted by the Phillies in the 9th round.
  - Rocky Childress was drafted by the Phillies in the 21st round.
  - Darren Daulton was drafted by the Phillies in the 25th round.
  - Kevin Romine was drafted by the Phillies in the 1st round (21st pick) of the secondary phase, but did not sign.
- July 17, 1980: Lerrin LaGrow was released by the Phillies.
- September 13, 1980: The Phillies traded a player to be named later to the Texas Rangers for Sparky Lyle. The Phillies completed the deal by sending Kevin Saucier to the Rangers on November 19.

== Game log ==
=== Regular season ===
Legend
	Phillies win
	Phillies loss
	Postponement
	Clinched division
**Bold**	Phillies team member

1980 regular season game log: 91–71 (Home: 49–32; Away: 42–39)
April: 6–9 (Home: 4–5; Away: 2–4)

#	Date	Time (ET)	Opponent	Score	Win	Loss	Save	Time of Game	Attendance	Record	Box Streak
1	April 11	8:05 p.m. EST	Expos	**W** 6–3	**Carlton** (1–0)	Rogers (0–1)	—	2:07	48,460	1–0	W1
2	April 12	1:15 p.m. EST	Expos	**W** 6–2	**Ruthven** (1–0)	Lee (0–1)	**McGraw** (1)	2:31	22,065	2–0	W2
3	April 13	1:35 p.m. EST	Expos	L 4–5 (10)	Sosa (1–0)	**LaGrow** (0–1)	—	3:02	28,132	2–1	L1
4	April 15		@ Cardinals	2–7	Pete Vuckovich (2–0)	**Randy Lerch** (0–1)	None		8,166	2–2	
5	April 16		@ Cardinals	8–3	**Steve Carlton** (2–0)	Bob Forsch (0–1)	None		10,911	3–2	
6	April 18	1:35 p.m. EST	@ Expos	L 5–7	Sanderson (1–0)	**Ruthven** (1–1)	Fryman (1)	2:45	41,222	3–3	L1
7	April 19	1:15 p.m. EST	@ Expos	**W** 13–4	**Christenson** (1–0)	Rogers (1–2)	**Noles** (1)	3:01	23,088	4–3	W1
8	April 20	1:35 p.m. EST	@ Expos	L 6–7	Sosa (2–0)	**McGraw** (0–1)	—	2:34	25,722	4–4	L1
9	April 21		Mets	0–3	Ray Burris (2–1)	**Steve Carlton** (2–1)	Neil Allen (4)		23,856	4–5	
10	April 22		Mets	14–8	**Kevin Saucier** (1–0)	Kevin Kobel (0–2)	None		21,341	5–5	
11	April 23		Mets	2–3	Mark Bomback (1–0)	**Lerrin LaGrow** (0–2)	Jeff Reardon (1)		23,025	5–6	
12	April 25		Cardinals	1–3	Pete Vuckovich (3–1)	**Randy Lerch** (0–2)	Mark Littell (1)		30,516	5–7	
13	April 26		Cardinals	7–0	**Steve Carlton** (3–1)	John Fulgham (1–2)	None		25,168	6–7	
14	April 27		Cardinals	1–10	Bob Forsch (1–1)	**Dick Ruthven** (1–2)	None		28,200	6–8	
–	April 29		@ Mets	Postponed (rain); Makeup: August 17 as a traditional double-header							
15	April 30		@ Mets	0–2	Mark Bomback (2–0)	**Randy Lerch** (0–3)	None		4,559	6–9	

May: 17–9 (Home: 11–4; Away: 6–5)

#	Date	Time (ET)	Opponent	Score	Win	Loss	Save	Time of Game	Attendance	Record	Box Streak
16	May 1		@ Mets	2–1	**Steve Carlton** (4–1)	Pete Falcone (1–2)	**Tug McGraw** (2)		5,928	7–9	
17	May 2	8:05 p.m. EDT	Dodgers	**W** 9–5	**Reed** (1–0)	Hough (0–1)	—	2:31	30,294	8–9	W2
18	May 3	1:15 p.m. EDT	Dodgers	**W** 7–3	**Christenson** (2–0)	Hooton (2–2)	—	2:34	35,011	9–9	W3
19	May 4	1:35 p.m. EDT	Dodgers	L 10–12^{^{[a]}}	Beckwith (2–0)	**Noles** (0–1)	Reuss (1)	3:22	34,027	9–10	L1
20	May 5		Braves	7–1	**Steve Carlton** (5–1)	Rick Matula (2–2)	None		26,165	10–10	
21	May 6		Braves	10–5	**Dick Ruthven** (2–2)	Doyle Alexander (0–2)	**Dickie Noles** (2)		25,302	11–10	
–	May 7		Braves	Postponed (rain); Makeup: July 25 as a traditional double-header							
22	May 9		@ Reds	2–5	Charlie Leibrandt (3–2)	**Randy Lerch** (0–4)	None		32,583	11–11	
23	May 10		@ Reds	3–5	Tom Seaver (2–1)	**Steve Carlton** (5–2)	Tom Hume (5)		28,919	11–12	
24	May 11		@ Reds	7–3	**Dick Ruthven** (3–2)	Mike LaCoss (3–3)	None		25,920	12–12	
25	May 13		@ Braves	3–7	Doyle Alexander (1–2)	**Randy Lerch** (0–5)	Rick Camp (1)		10,146	12–13	
26	May 14		@ Braves	9–1	**Steve Carlton** (6–2)	Larry McWilliams (2–3)	None		4,625	13–13	
27	May 16	8:35 p.m. EDT	@ Astros	3–0	**Ruthven** (4–2)	Richard (4–2)	—	2:06	33,610	14–13	W2
28	May 17	8:35 p.m. EDT	@ Astros	4–2	**Christenson** (3–0)	Niekro (4–3)	**Noles** (3)	2:25	43,525	15–13	W3
29	May 18	3:05 p.m. EDT	@ Astros	0–3	Ryan (2–3)	**Lerch** (0–6)	—	2:07	33,950	15–14	L1
30	May 19		Reds	6–4	**Steve Carlton** (7–2)	Frank Pastore (4–2)	**Ron Reed** (1)		25,109	16–14	
31	May 20		Reds	6–7	Paul Moskau (2–0)	**Dick Ruthven** (4–3)	Doug Bair (3)		25,202	16–15	
32	May 21		Reds	9–8	**Ron Reed** (2–0)	Tom Hume (3–4)	None		26,099	17–15	
33	May 23	8:05 p.m. EDT	Astros	3–0	**Carlton** (8–2)	Ryan (2–4)	—	2:11	27,822	18–15	W2
34	May 24	7:05 p.m. EDT	Astros	5–4	**Saucier** (2–0)	Andújar (0–2)	**McGraw** (3)	2:28	28,539	19–15	W3
35	May 25	1:35 p.m. EDT	Astros	6–2	**Ruthven** (5–3)	Forsch (5–3)	—	2:10	37,349	20–15	W4
36	May 26		Pirates	7–6	**Ron Reed** (3–0)	Kent Tekulve (5–3)	None		45,394	21–15	
37	May 27		Pirates	2–3 (13)	Enrique Romo (3–0)	**Dickie Noles** (0–2)	Kent Tekulve (6)		35,989	21–16	
38	May 28		Pirates	6–3	**Randy Lerch** (1–6)	Don Robinson (1–1)	**Ron Reed** (2)		30,209	22–16	
39	May 29		Pirates	4–5	Eddie Solomon (2–0)	**Dick Ruthven** (5–4)	Enrique Romo (2)		30,630	22–17	
40	May 30		@ Cubs	7–10	Rick Reuschel (4–4)	**Dan Larson** (0–1)	None		8,632	22–18	
41	May 31		@ Cubs	7–0	**Steve Carlton** (9–2)	Willie Hernández (1–4)	None		26,937	23–18	

June: 14–14 (Home: 8–8; Away: 6–6)

#	Date	Time (ET)	Opponent	Score	Win	Loss	Save	Time of Game	Attendance	Record	Box Streak
42	June 1		@ Cubs	4–5	Dick Tidrow (2–0)	**Ron Reed** (3–1)	Bruce Sutter (11)		20,051	23–19	
43	June 2		@ Pirates	3–9	Don Robinson (2–1)	**Randy Lerch** (1–7)	None		19,990	23–20	
44	June 3		@ Pirates	3–4	Grant Jackson (5–1)	**Tug McGraw** (0–2)	None		22,141	23–21	
45	June 4		@ Pirates	4–3	**Steve Carlton** (10–2)	John Candelaria (2–5)	None		31,075	24–21	
46	June 6		Cubs	6–5	**Bob Walk** (1–0)	Mike Krukow (3–6)	**Tug McGraw** (4)		30,189	25–21	
47	June 7		Cubs	5–2	**Randy Lerch** (2–7)	Rick Reuschel (5–5)	**Dickie Noles** (4)		31,153	26–21	
48	June 8		Cubs	0–2	Lynn McGlothen (3–2)	**Dick Ruthven** (5–5)	Bruce Sutter (12)		40,206	26–22	
49	June 9		Giants	1–3	Allen Ripley (1–0)	**Dickie Noles** (0–3)	Greg Minton (2)		28,702	26–23	
50	June 10		Giants	4–3	**Kevin Saucier** (3–0)	Bob Knepper (4–8)	**Ron Reed** (3)		32,635	27–23	
51	June 11		Giants	4–7	Ed Whitson (3–7)	**Randy Lerch** (2–8)	Greg Minton (3)		37,844	27–24	
52	June 13		Padres	9–6	**Dick Ruthven** (6–5)	Randy Jones (4–6)	None		37,873	28–24	
53	June 14		Padres	3–1	**Steve Carlton** (11–2)	Steve Mura (0–2)	**Tug McGraw** (5)		35,231	29–24	
54	June 15		Padres	8–5	**Bob Walk** (2–0)	Rick Wise (3–4)	**Lerrin LaGrow** (1)		36,374	30–24	
55	June 16	10:35 p.m. EDT	@ Dodgers	**W** 3–2 (12)	**Reed** (4–1)	Sutcliffe (1–4)	**McGraw** (6)	2:53	41,340	31–24	W4
56	June 17	10:35 p.m. EDT	@ Dodgers	**W** 6–5	**Reed** (5–1)	Castillo (1–3)	**McGraw** (7)	2:48	40,786	32–24	W5
57	June 18		@ Padres	5–1	**Steve Carlton** (12–2)	Bob Shirley (5–3)	None		15,621	33–24	
58	June 19		@ Padres	3–4	Dennis Kinney (2–1)	**Kevin Saucier** (3–1)	Rollie Fingers (8)		16,712	33–25	
59	June 20		@ Giants	1–5	Allen Ripley (2–1)	**Dan Larson** (0–2)	None		9,490	33–26	
60	June 21		@ Giants	3–9	Ed Whitson (5–7)	**Randy Lerch** (2–9)	None		11,809	33–27	
61	June 22		@ Giants	4–3	**Steve Carlton** (13–2)	Vida Blue (9–4)	None		27,315	34–27	
62	June 24	7:35 p.m. EDT	Expos	L 6–7 (10)	Sosa (5–3)	**McGraw** (0–3)	—	3:32	32,101	34–28	L1
63	June 25	7:35 p.m. EDT	Expos	**W** 2–1 (10)	**Reed** (6–1)	Bahnsen (5–2)	—	2:42	31,416	35–28	W1
64	June 26	7:35 p.m. EDT	Expos	L 0–1	Sanderson (7–4)	**Lerch** (2–10)	—	2:08	31,696	35–29	L1
65	June 27		Mets	2–3	John Pacella (1–0)	**Steve Carlton** (13–3)	Tom Hausman (1)		37,123	35–30	
66	June 28 (1)		Mets	1–2 (11)	Neil Allen (4–5)	**Ron Reed** (6–2)	None		see 2nd game	35–31	
67	June 28 (2)		Mets	4–5	Tom Hausman (3–2)	**Kevin Saucier** (3–2)	Neil Allen (13)		47,169	35–32	
68	June 29		Mets	5–2	**Bob Walk** (3–0)	Pat Zachry (2–5)	**Lerrin LaGrow** (2)		41,113	36–32	
69	June 30	8:35 p.m. EDT	@ Expos	**W** 7–5	**Noles** (1–3)	Gullickson (0–2)	**Reed** (4)	2:39	36,347	37–32	W2

July: 15–14 (Home: 8–4; Away: 7–10)

#	Date	Time (ET)	Opponent	Score	Win	Loss	Save	Time of Game	Attendance	Record	Box Streak
70	July 1	7:35 p.m. EDT	@ Expos	**W** 5–4 (11)	**Lerch** (3–10)	Fryman (1–3)	**LaGrow** (3)	2:51	33,761	38–32	W3
71	July 2	7:35 p.m. EDT	@ Expos	L 1–6	Rogers (10–6)	**Carlton** (13–4)	—	2:25	23,233	38–33	L1
72	July 3 (1)		@ Cardinals	2–1	**Dick Ruthven** (7–5)	Bob Forsch (5–6)	None		see 2nd game	39–33	
73	July 3 (2)		@ Cardinals	8–1	**Bob Walk** (4–0)	Jim Otten (0–3)	None		38,038	40–33	
74	July 4		@ Cardinals	0–1 (10)	Bob Sykes (3–6)	**Kevin Saucier** (3–3)	None		15,481	40–34	
75	July 5		@ Cardinals	1–6	Jim Kaat (3–6)	**Randy Lerch** (3–11)	None		27,932	40–35	
76	July 6		@ Cardinals	8–3	**Steve Carlton** (14–4)	Pete Vuckovich (7–6)	None		17,769	41–35	
—	July 8	8:40 p.m. EDT	51st All-Star Game	American League vs. National League (Dodger Stadium, Los Angeles, California)							
77	July 10		Cubs	5–3	**Dick Ruthven** (8–5)	Mike Krukow (6–10)	**Dickie Noles** (5)		33,130	42–35	
78	July 11		Cubs	7–2	**Bob Walk** (5–0)	Lynn McGlothen (6–6)	**Ron Reed** (5)		50,204	43–35	
79	July 12		Pirates	5–4	**Kevin Saucier** (4–3)	Kent Tekulve (5–5)	None		53,254	44–35	
80	July 13		Pirates	3–7	Don Robinson (3–4)	**Nino Espinosa** (0–1)	Kent Tekulve (11)		48,132	44–36	
81	July 14		Pirates	11–13	Grant Jackson (7–2)	**Ron Reed** (6–3)	None		44,245	44–37	
82	July 15	8:35 p.m. EDT	@ Astros	2–3	Sambito (4–1)	**Ruthven** (8–6)	—	2:08	24,223	44–38	L3
83	July 16	8:35 p.m. EDT	@ Astros	4–2	**Walk** (6–0)	Forsch (8–9)	—	2:06	28,532	45–38	W1
84	July 17	8:35 p.m. EDT	@ Astros	2–1	**Carlton** (15–4)	Niekro (10–8)	—	2:18	26,403	46–38	W2
85	July 18		@ Braves	7–2	**Nino Espinosa** (1–1)	Phil Niekro (7–12)	**Dickie Noles** (6)		13,908	47–38	
86	July 19 (1)		@ Braves	2–5	Doyle Alexander (8–5)	**Dick Ruthven** (8–7)	None		see 2nd game	47–39	
87	July 19 (2)		@ Braves	2–7	Tommy Boggs (4–5)	**Dan Larson** (0–3)	Rick Camp (4)		35,524	47–40	
88	July 20		@ Braves	2–3	Larry McWilliams (7–6)	**Bob Walk** (6–1)	None		9,335	47–41	
89	July 21		@ Reds	4–5	Charlie Leibrandt (9–6)	**Randy Lerch** (3–12)	Tom Hume (15)		27,177	47–42	
90	July 22		@ Reds	2–3	Mario Soto (4–4)	**Steve Carlton** (15–5)	None		28,079	47–43	
91	July 23		@ Reds	3–7	Bruce Berenyi (2–0)	**Nino Espinosa** (1–2)	Tom Hume (16)		29,614	47–44	
92	July 25 (1)		Braves	5–4 (12)	**Dick Ruthven** (9–7)	Rick Camp (3–4)	None		see 2nd game	48–44	
93	July 25 (2)		Braves	0–3	Tommy Boggs (5–5)	**Dan Larson** (0–4)	None		38,408	48–45	
94	July 26		Braves	6–3	**Bob Walk** (7–1)	Phil Niekro (8–13)	**Ron Reed** (6)		33,112	49–45	
95	July 27		Braves	17–4	**Steve Carlton** (16–5)	Rick Matula (6–9)	None		35,249	50–45	
96	July 28	7:35 p.m. EDT	Astros	2–3 (10)	Sambito (6–1)	**Reed** (6–4)	—	2:41	30,181	50–46	L1
97	July 29	7:35 p.m. EDT	Astros	9–6	**Saucier** (5–3)	LaCorte (7–3)	**McGraw** (8)	3:05	30,252	51–46	W1
98	July 30	7:35 p.m. EDT	Astros	6–4	**Ruthven** (10–7)	Ryan (5–8)	**McGraw** (9)	2:36	31,342	52–46	W2

August: 16–14 (Home: 7–7; Away: 9–7)

#	Date	Time (ET)	Opponent	Score	Win	Loss	Save	Time of Game	Attendance	Record	Box Streak
99	August 1		Reds	3–1	**Bob Walk** (8–1)	Charlie Leibrandt (9–7)	**Tug McGraw** (10)		37,409	53–46	
100	August 2		Reds	0–2	Mike LaCoss (6–9)	**Steve Carlton** (16–6)	None		43,244	53–47	
101	August 3		Reds	8–4	**Nino Espinosa** (2–2)	Bruce Berenyi (2–2)	**Ron Reed** (7)		41,328	54–47	
–	August 5		Cardinals	Postponed (rain); Makeup: September 12 as a traditional double-header							
102	August 6		Cardinals	0–14	Bob Sykes (5–8)	**Bob Walk** (8–2)	None		31,629	54–48	
103	August 7		Cardinals	3–2	**Steve Carlton** (17–6)	John Fulgham (3–4)	**Tug McGraw** (11)		31,397	55–48	
104	August 8		@ Pirates	5–6	Kent Tekulve (8–5)	**Tug McGraw** (0–4)	Enrique Romo (8)		30,354	55–49	
105	August 9		@ Pirates	1–4	John Candelaria (8–11)	**Nino Espinosa** (2–3)	Kent Tekulve (16)		39,984	55–50	
106	August 10 (1)		@ Pirates	1–7	Jim Bibby (14–2)	**Randy Lerch** (3–13)	None		see 2nd game	55–51	
107	August 10 (2)		@ Pirates	1–4	Don Robinson (4–5)	**Dan Larson** (0–5)	Kent Tekulve (17)		37,323	55–52	
108	August 11		@ Cubs	8–5 (15)^{^{[b]}}	**Warren Brusstar** (1–0)	George Riley (0–2)	None		10,805	56–52	
109	August 12		@ Cubs	5–2	**Steve Carlton** (18–6)	Mike Krukow (7–12)	None		20,808	57–52	
110	August 13		@ Cubs	1–2	Dick Tidrow (5–3)	**Dick Ruthven** (10–8)	None		13,215	57–53	
111	August 14		@ Mets	8–1	**Nino Espinosa** (3–3)	Pat Zachry (6–6)	None		20,149	58–53	
112	August 15		@ Mets	8–0	**Larry Christenson** (4–0)	Mark Bomback (9–4)	**Tug McGraw** (12)		40,436	59–53	
113	August 16		@ Mets	11–6	**Bob Walk** (9–2)	Craig Swan (5–9)	None		23,514	60–53	
114	August 17 (1)		@ Mets	9–4	**Steve Carlton** (19–6)	Ray Burris (6–7)	None		see 2nd game	61–53	
115	August 17 (2)		@ Mets	4–1	**Randy Lerch** (4–13)	Roy Lee Jackson (1–4)	**Ron Reed** (8)		25,458	62–53	
116	August 19		Padres	7–4	**Dick Ruthven** (11–8)	Bob Shirley (9–9)	**Tug McGraw** (13)		30,588	63–53	
117	August 20		Padres	5–7	John Curtis (5–8)	**Nino Espinosa** (3–4)	Rollie Fingers (16)		30,403	63–54	
118	August 21		Padres	9–8 (17)	**Kevin Saucier** (6–3)	Dennis Kinney (4–5)	None		36,201	64–54	
119	August 22		Giants	3–4 (10)	Al Holland (5–2)	**Steve Carlton** (19–7)	None		36,073	64–55	
120	August 23		Giants	2–6	Allen Ripley (7–6)	**Larry Christenson** (4–1)	None		38,541	64–56	
121	August 24		Giants	7–1^{^{[c]}}	**Dick Ruthven** (12–8)	Bob Knepper (9–15)	None		37,325	65–56	
122	August 25	7:35 p.m. EDT	Dodgers	L 4–8	Stanhouse (2–2)	**Noles** (1–4)	—	2:39	34,267	65–57	L1
123	August 26	7:35 p.m. EDT	Dodgers	L 4–8	Castillo (4–6)	**Walk** (9–3)	—	2:47	35,358	65–58	L2
124	August 27	7:35 p.m. EDT	Dodgers	**W** 4–3	**Carlton** (20–7)	Howe (6–6)	**McGraw** (14)	2:18	39,116	66–58	W1
125	August 29		@ Padres	3–2	**Larry Christenson** (5–1)	Steve Mura (4–7)	**Tug McGraw** (15)		10,742	67–58	
126	August 30 (1)		@ Padres	6–1	**Dick Ruthven** (13–8)	Bob Shirley (9–10)	None		see 2nd game	68–58	
127	August 30 (2)		@ Padres	1–5	John Curtis (6–8)	**Nino Espinosa** (3–5)	None		13,209	68–59	
128	August 31		@ Padres	3–10	Gary Lucas (5–7)	**Bob Walk** (9–4)	Rollie Fingers (18)		7,815	68–60	

September: 19–10 (Home: 9–4; Away: 10–6)

#	Date	Time (ET)	Opponent	Score	Win	Loss	Save	Time of Game	Attendance	Record	Box Streak
129	September 1		@ Giants	6–4	**Steve Carlton** (21–7)	Greg Minton (3–5)	None		16,952	69–60	
130	September 2		@ Giants	2–1 (13)	**Ron Reed** (7–4)	Al Holland (5–3)	None		6,135	70–60	
131	September 3		@ Giants	4–3	**Dick Ruthven** (14–8)	Allen Ripley (7–8)	**Tug McGraw** (16)		5,504	71–60	
132	September 4	10:35 p.m. EDT	@ Dodgers	**W** 3–2	**Walk** (10–4)	Reuss (16–5)	**McGraw** (17)	2:19	41,864	72–60	W4
133	September 5	10:35 p.m. EDT	@ Dodgers	L 0–1	Sutton (10–4)	**Carlton** (21–8)	Stanhouse (5)	1:59	41,019	72–61	L1
134	September 6	10:05 p.m. EDT	@ Dodgers	L 3–7	Welch (12–9)	**Lerch** (4–14)	Howe (15)	2:32	45,995	72–62	L2
135	September 7	4:05 p.m. EDT	@ Dodgers	L 0–6	Castillo (6–6)	**Ruthven** (14–9)	—	2:29	39,083	72–63	L3
136	September 8		Pirates	6–2	**Tug McGraw** (1–4)	Enrique Romo (5–5)	None		40,576	73–63	
137	September 9		Pirates	5–4 (14)	**Warren Brusstar** (2–0)	Mark Lee (0–1)	None		43,333	74–63	
138	September 10		@ Mets	5–0	**Marty Bystrom** (1–0)	Mark Bomback (9–7)	None		6,748	75–63	
139	September 11		@ Mets	5–1	**Dick Ruthven** (15–9)	Ray Burris (7–11)	None		6,376	76–63	
140	September 12 (1)		Cardinals	4–7	Pete Vuckovich (11–9)	**Bob Walk** (10–5)	John Urrea (2)		see 2nd game	76–64	
141	September 12 (2)		Cardinals	0–5 (11)	John Littlefield (5–3)	**Ron Reed** (7–5)	None		44,093	76–65	
142	September 13		Cardinals	2–1	**Steve Carlton** (22–8)	Bob Forsch (11–9)	None		41,728	77–65	
143	September 14		Cardinals	8–4	**Marty Bystrom** (2–0)	Silvio Martínez (5–10)	None		30,137	78–65	
144	September 16		@ Pirates	2–3	Jim Bibby (17–5)	**Dick Ruthven** (15–10)	Kent Tekulve (20)		22,239	78–66	
145	September 17		@ Pirates	5–4 (11)	**Tug McGraw** (2–4)	Kent Tekulve (8–10)	**Sparky Lyle** (9)		23,650	79–66	
146	September 19		@ Cubs	3–4 (11)	Lee Smith (2–0)	**Warren Brusstar** (2–1)	None		4,352	79–67	
147	September 20		@ Cubs	7–3	**Marty Bystrom** (3–0)	Lynn McGlothen (10–13)	None		11,713	80–67	
148	September 21		@ Cubs	7–3	**Dick Ruthven** (16–10)	Dennis Lamp (10–12)	**Ron Reed** (9)		10,190	81–67	
149	September 22		@ Cardinals	3–2 (10)	**Steve Carlton** (23–8)	Kim Seaman (3–2)	**Tug McGraw** (18)		5,654	82–67	
150	September 23		@ Cardinals	3–6	Al Olmsted (1–0)	**Bob Walk** (10–6)	John Littlefield (9)		6,915	82–68	
151	September 24		Mets	1–0 (10)	**Tug McGraw** (3–4)	Neil Allen (7–9)	None		24,258	83–68	
152	September 25		Mets	2–1	**Marty Bystrom** (4–0)	Roy Lee Jackson (1–6)	**Sparky Lyle** (10)		20,525	84–68	
153	September 26	8:05 p.m. EDT	Expos	**W** 2–1	**McGraw** (4–4)	Palmer (7–6)	—	2:01	50,887	85–68	W3
154	September 27	2:15 p.m. EDT	Expos	L 3–4	Sanderson (16–10)	**Carlton** (23–9)	Fryman (17)	2:19	53,058	85–69	L1
155	September 28	3:05 p.m. EDT	Expos	L 3–8	Rogers (16–11)	**Walk** (10–7)	—	2:42	40,305	85–70	L2
156	September 29		Cubs	6–5 (15)	**Kevin Saucier** (7–3)	Dennis Lamp (10–13)	None		21,127	86–70	
157	September 30		Cubs	14–2	**Marty Bystrom** (5–0)	Lynn McGlothen (11–14)	None		24,349	87–70	

October: 4–1 (Home: 2–0; Away: 2–1)

#	Date	Time (ET)	Opponent	Score	Win	Loss	Save	Time of Game	Attendance	Record	Box Streak
158	October 1		Cubs	5–0	**Steve Carlton** (24–9)	Dennis Lamp (10–14)	None		25,658	88–70	
159	October 2		Cubs	4–2	**Bob Walk** (11–7)	Bill Caudill (4–6)	**Tug McGraw** (19)		23,806	89–70	
160	October 3	7:35 p.m. EDT	@ Expos	**W** 2–1	**Ruthven** (17–10)	Sanderson (16–11)	**McGraw** (20)	2:39	57,121	90–70	W5
161	October 4	2:15 p.m. EDT	@ Expos	**W** 6–4 (11)	**McGraw** (5–4)	Bahnsen (7–6)	—	3:51	50,794	91–70	W6
162	October 5	3:05 p.m. EDT	@ Expos	L 7–8 (10)	Lea (7–5)	**Brusstar** (2–2)	—	3:31	30,104	91–71	L1

^{^[a]}The May 4, 1980, game was protested by the Phillies in the top of the first inning. The protest was later denied.
^{^[b]}The August 11 game was suspended in the bottom of the 14th with the score 5–5 and was completed August 12, 1980.
^{^[c]}The August 24, 1980, game was protested by the Giants in the bottom of the fourth inning. The protest was later denied.

=== Detailed records ===
==== vs. Opponents ====
**National League**
Opponent	Home	Away	Total	Pct.	Runs scored	Runs allowed
**NL East**
Montreal Expos	4–5	5–4	9–9	.500	84	78
**Philadelphia Phillies**	—	—	—	—	—	—
**Div Total**	**4–5**	**5–4**	**9–9**	**.500**	**84**	**78**
**NL West**
Houston Astros	5–1	4–2	9–3	.750	46	30
Los Angeles Dodgers	3–3	3–3	6–6	.500	53	62
**Div Total**	**8–4**	**7–5**	**15–9**	**.625**	**99**	**92**
**Season Total**	**12–9**	**12–9**	**24–18**	**.571**	**183**	**170**

==== Month-by-Month ====
Month	Games	Won	Lost	Win %	RS	RA
April
May
June
July
August
September
October
Total

	Games	Won	Lost	Win %	RS	RA
Home
Road
Total

=== Composite Box ===
1980 Philadelphia Phillies Inning–by–Inning Boxscore
Team	1	2	3	4	5	6	7	8	9	10	11	12	13	14	15	16	17	R	H	E
Opponents
Phillies

=== Postseason ===
Legend
	Phillies win
	Phillies loss
	Postponement
**Bold**	Phillies team member

1980 Postseason Game Log: 7–4 (Home: 4–1; Away: 3–3)
NL Championship Series vs. Houston Astros: 3–2 (Home: 1–1; Away: 2–1)

#	Date	Time (ET)	Opponent	Score	Win	Loss	Save	Time of Game	Attendance	Series	Box Streak
1	October 7	8:15 p.m. EDT	Astros	3–1	**Carlton** (1–0)	Forsch (0–1)	**McGraw** (1)	2:35	65,277	PHI 1–0	W1
2	October 8	8:15 p.m. EDT	Astros	4–7 (10)	LaCorte (1–0)	**Reed** (0–1)	Andújar (1)	3:34	65,478	TIE 1–1	L1
3	October 10	3:00 p.m. EDT	@ Astros	0–1 (11)	Smith (1–0)	**McGraw** (0–1)	—	3:22	44,443	HOU 2–1	L2
4	October 11	4:15 p.m. EDT	@ Astros	5–3 (10)	**Brusstar** (1–0)	Sambito (0–1)	**McGraw** (2)	3:55	44,952	TIE 2–2	W1
5	October 12	8:00 p.m. EDT	@ Astros	8–7 (10)	**Ruthven** (1–0)	LaCorte (1–1)	—	3:38	44,802	PHI 3–2	W2

World Series vs. Kansas City Royals: 4–2 (Home: 3–0; Away: 1–2)

#	Date	Time (ET)	Opponent	Score	Win	Loss	Save	Time of Game	Attendance	Series	Box Streak
1	October 14	8:30 p.m. EDT	Royals	7–6	**Walk** (1–0)	Leonard (1–1)	**McGraw** (3)	3:01	65,791	PHI 1–0	W1
2	October 15	8:20 p.m. EDT	Royals	6–4	**Carlton** (2–0)	Quisenberry (1–1)	**Reed** (1)	3:01	65,775	PHI 2–0	W2
3	October 17	8:30 p.m. EDT	@ Royals	3–4 (10)	Quisenberry (2–1)	**McGraw** (0–2)	—	3:19	42,380	PHI 2–1	L1
4	October 18	1:45 p.m. EDT	@ Royals	3–5	Leonard (2–1)	**Christenson** (0–1)	Quisenberry (2)	2:37	42,363	TIE 2–2	L2
5	October 19	4:30 p.m. EDT	@ Royals	4–3	**McGraw** (1–2)	Quisenberry (2–2)	—	2:51	42,369	PHI 3–2	W1
6	October 21	8:20 p.m. EDT	Royals	4–1	**Carlton** (3–0)	Gale (0–1)	**McGraw** (4)	3:00	65,838	PHI 4–2	W2

== Starting Lineups ==
=== Regular Season ===
==== Batting Order ====
1980 Regular Season Batting Order game log
April

#	Date	Opponent	1st	2nd	3rd	4th	5th	6th	7th	8th	9th
1	April 11	MTL									
2	April 12	MTL									
3	April 13	MTL									
6	April 18	@ MTL									
7	April 19	@ MTL									
8	April 20	@ MTL									

May

#	Date	Opponent	1st	2nd	3rd	4th	5th	6th	7th	8th	9th
17	May 2	LA									
18	May 3	LA									
19	May 4	LA									
27	May 16	@ HOU	#14; Rose (1B)	#21; McBride (RF)	#25; Unser (CF)	#20; Schmidt (3B)	#8; Boone (C)	#23; Gross (LF)	#10; Bowa (SS)	#9; Trillo (2B)	#41; Ruthven (SP)
28	May 17	@ HOU	#14; Rose (1B)	#21; McBride (RF)	#20; Schmidt (3B)	#19; Luzinski (LF)	#8; Boone (C)	#31; Maddox (CF)	#10; Bowa (SS)	#9; Trillo (2B)	#38; Christenson (SP)
29	May 18	@ HOU	#14; Rose (1B)	#21; McBride (RF)	#20; Schmidt (3B)	#19; Luzinski (LF)	#8; Boone (C)	#31; Maddox (CF)	#10; Bowa (SS)	#9; Trillo (2B)	#47; Lerch (SP)
33	May 23	HOU	#14; Rose (1B)	#21; McBride (RF)	#20; Schmidt (3B)	#19; Luzinski (LF)	#8; Boone (C)	#31; Maddox (CF)	#9; Trillo (2B)	#15; Avilés (SS)	#32; Carlton (SP)
34	May 24	HOU	#14; Rose (1B)	#21; McBride (RF)	#20; Schmidt (3B)	#19; Luzinski (LF)	#8; Boone (C)	#31; Maddox (CF)	#10; Bowa (SS)	#9; Trillo (2B)	#49; Larson (SP)
35	May 25	HOU	#14; Rose (1B)	#21; McBride (RF)	#20; Schmidt (3B)	#19; Luzinski (LF)	#8; Boone (C)	#31; Maddox (CF)	#10; Bowa (SS)	#9; Trillo (2B)	#41; Ruthven (SP)

June

#	Date	Opponent	1st	2nd	3rd	4th	5th	6th	7th	8th	9th
56	June 16	@ LA									
57	June 17	@ LA									
62	June 24	MTL									
63	June 25	MTL									
64	June 26	MTL									
69	June 30	@ MTL									

July

#	Date	Opponent	1st	2nd	3rd	4th	5th	6th	7th	8th	9th
70	July 1	@ MTL									
71	July 2	@ MTL									
82	July 15	@ HOU	#14; Rose (1B)	#9; Trillo (2B)	#21; McBride (RF)	#25; Unser (LF)	#31; Maddox (CF)	#8; Boone (C)	#10; Bowa (SS)	#18; J. Vukovich (3B)	#41; Ruthven (SP)
83	July 16	@ HOU	#27; Smith (LF)	#14; Rose (1B)	#21; McBride (RF)	#6; Moreland (C)	#31; Maddox (CF)	#9; Trillo (2B)	#15; Avilés (SS)	#18; J. Vukovich (3B)	#41; Walk (SP)
84	July 17	@ HOU	#27; Smith (LF)	#14; Rose (1B)	#21; McBride (RF)	#6; Moreland (3B)	#31; Maddox (CF)	#8; Boone (C)	#10; Bowa (SS)	#15; Avilés (2B)	#32; Carlton (SP)
96	July 28	HOU	#27; Smith (LF)	#14; Rose (1B)	#21; McBride (RF)	#20; Schmidt (3B)	#31; Maddox (CF)	#9; Trillo (2B)	#10; Bowa (SS)	#8; Boone (C)	#35; Espinosa (SP)
97	July 29	HOU	#27; Smith (LF)	#14; Rose (1B)	#21; McBride (RF)	#20; Schmidt (3B)	#6; Moreland (C)	#31; Maddox (CF)	#9; Trillo (2B)	#10; Bowa (SS)	#47; Lerch (SP)
98	July 30	HOU	#27; Smith (LF)	#14; Rose (1B)	#21; McBride (RF)	#20; Schmidt (3B)	#6; Moreland (C)	#31; Maddox (CF)	#9; Trillo (2B)	#10; Bowa (SS)	#41; Ruthven (SP)

August

#	Date	Opponent	1st	2nd	3rd	4th	5th	6th	7th	8th	9th
122	August 25	LA									
123	August 26	LA									
124	August 27	LA									

September

#	Date	Opponent	1st	2nd	3rd	4th	5th	6th	7th	8th	9th
132	September 4	@ LA									
133	September 5	@ LA									
134	September 6	@ LA									
135	September 7	@ LA									
153	September 26	MTL									
154	September 27	MTL									
155	September 28	MTL									

October

#	Date	Opponent	1st	2nd	3rd	4th	5th	6th	7th	8th	9th
160	October 3	@ MTL									
161	October 4	@ MTL									
162	October 5	@ MTL									

==== Defensive Lineup ====
1980 Regular Season Defensive Lineup game log
April

#	Date	Opponent	C	1B	2B	3B	SS	LF	CF	RF	P
1	April 11	MTL									
2	April 12	MTL									
3	April 13	MTL									
6	April 18	@ MTL									
7	April 19	@ MTL									
8	April 20	@ MTL									

May

#	Date	Opponent	C	1B	2B	3B	SS	LF	CF	RF	P
17	May 2	LA									
18	May 3	LA									
19	May 4	LA									
27	May 16	@ HOU	#8; Boone	#14; Rose	#9; Trillo	#20; Schmidt	#10; Bowa	#23; Gross	#25; Unser	#21; McBride	#41; Ruthven
28	May 17	@ HOU	#8; Boone	#14; Rose	#9; Trillo	#20; Schmidt	#10; Bowa	#19; Luzinski	#31; Maddox	#21; McBride	#38; Christenson
29	May 18	@ HOU	#8; Boone	#14; Rose	#9; Trillo	#20; Schmidt	#10; Bowa	#19; Luzinski	#31; Maddox	#21; McBride	#47; Lerch
33	May 23	HOU	#8; Boone	#14; Rose	#9; Trillo	#20; Schmidt	#15; Avilés	#19; Luzinski	#31; Maddox	#21; McBride	#32; Carlton
34	May 24	HOU	#8; Boone	#14; Rose	#9; Trillo	#20; Schmidt	#10; Bowa	#19; Luzinski	#31; Maddox	#21; McBride	#49; Larson
35	May 25	HOU	#8; Boone	#14; Rose	#9; Trillo	#20; Schmidt	#10; Bowa	#19; Luzinski	#31; Maddox	#21; McBride	#41; Ruthven

June

#	Date	Opponent	C	1B	2B	3B	SS	LF	CF	RF	P
56	June 16	@ LA									
57	June 17	@ LA									
62	June 24	MTL									
63	June 25	MTL									
64	June 26	MTL									
69	June 30	@ MTL									

July

#	Date	Opponent	C	1B	2B	3B	SS	LF	CF	RF	P
70	July 1	@ MTL									
71	July 2	@ MTL									
82	July 15	@ HOU	#8; Boone	#14; Rose	#9; Trillo	#18; J. Vukovich	#10; Bowa	#25; Unser	#31; Maddox	#21; McBride	#41; Ruthven
83	July 16	@ HOU	#6; Moreland	#14; Rose	#9; Trillo	#18; J. Vukovich	#15; Avilés	#27; Smith	#31; Maddox	#21; McBride	#41; Walk
84	July 17	@ HOU	#8; Boone	#14; Rose	#15; Avilés	#6; Moreland	#10; Bowa	#27; Smith	#31; Maddox	#21; McBride	#32; Carlton
96	July 28	HOU	#8; Boone	#14; Rose	#9; Trillo	#20; Schmidt	#10; Bowa	#27; Smith	#31; Maddox	#21; McBride	#35; Espinosa
97	July 29	HOU	#6; Moreland	#14; Rose	#9; Trillo	#20; Schmidt	#10; Bowa	#27; Smith	#31; Maddox	#21; McBride	#47; Lerch
98	July 30	HOU	#6; Moreland	#14; Rose	#9; Trillo	#20; Schmidt	#10; Bowa	#27; Smith	#31; Maddox	#21; McBride	#41; Ruthven

August

#	Date	Opponent	C	1B	2B	3B	SS	LF	CF	RF	P
122	August 25	LA									
123	August 26	LA									
124	August 27	LA									

September

#	Date	Opponent	C	1B	2B	3B	SS	LF	CF	RF	P
132	September 4	@ LA									
133	September 5	@ LA									
134	September 6	@ LA									
135	September 7	@ LA									
153	September 26	MTL									
154	September 27	MTL									
155	September 28	MTL									

October

#	Date	Opponent	C	1B	2B	3B	SS	LF	CF	RF	P
160	October 3	@ MTL									
161	October 4	@ MTL									
162	October 5	@ MTL									

=== Postseason ===
==== Batting Order ====
1980 Postseason Batting Order game log
NL Championship Series vs. Houston Astros

#	Date	Opponent	1st	2nd	3rd	4th	5th	6th	7th	8th	9th
1	October 7	HOU	#14; Rose (1B)	#21; McBride (RF)	#20; Schmidt (3B)	#19; Luzinski (LF)	#9; Trillo (2B)	#31; Maddox (CF)	#10; Bowa (SS)	#8; Boone (C)	#32; Carlton (SP)
2	October 8	HOU	#14; Rose (1B)	#21; McBride (RF)	#20; Schmidt (3B)	#19; Luzinski (LF)	#9; Trillo (2B)	#31; Maddox (CF)	#10; Bowa (SS)	#8; Boone (C)	#41; Ruthven (SP)
3	October 10	@ HOU	#14; Rose (1B)	#21; McBride (RF)	#20; Schmidt (3B)	#19; Luzinski (LF)	#9; Trillo (2B)	#31; Maddox (CF)	#10; Bowa (SS)	#8; Boone (C)	#38; Christenson (SP)
4	October 11	@ HOU	#27; Smith (LF)	#14; Rose (1B)	#21; McBride (RF)	#20; Schmidt (3B)	#9; Trillo (2B)	#31; Maddox (CF)	#10; Bowa (SS)	#8; Boone (C)	#32; Carlton (SP)
5	October 12	@ HOU	#14; Rose (1B)	#21; McBride (RF)	#20; Schmidt (3B)	#19; Luzinski (LF)	#9; Trillo (2B)	#31; Maddox (CF)	#10; Bowa (SS)	#8; Boone (C)	#50; Bystrom (SP)

World Series vs. Kansas City Royals

#	Date	Opponent	1st	2nd	3rd	4th	5th	6th	7th	8th	9th
1	October 14	KC	#27; Smith (LF)	#14; Rose (1B)	#20; Schmidt (3B)	#21; McBride (RF)	#19; Luzinski (DH)	#31; Maddox (CF)	#9; Trillo (2B)	#10; Bowa (SS)	#8; Boone (C)
2	October 15	KC	#27; Smith (LF)	#14; Rose (1B)	#21; McBride (RF)	#20; Schmidt (3B)	#6; Moreland (DH)	#31; Maddox (CF)	#9; Trillo (2B)	#10; Bowa (SS)	#8; Boone (C)
3	October 17	@ KC	#27; Smith (LF)	#14; Rose (1B)	#20; Schmidt (3B)	#21; McBride (RF)	#6; Moreland (DH)	#31; Maddox (CF)	#9; Trillo (2B)	#10; Bowa (SS)	#8; Boone (C)
4	October 18	@ KC	#27; Smith (DH)	#14; Rose (1B)	#21; McBride (RF)	#20; Schmidt (3B)	#25; Unser (LF)	#31; Maddox (CF)	#9; Trillo (2B)	#10; Bowa (SS)	#8; Boone (C)
5	October 19	@ KC	#14; Rose (1B)	#21; McBride (RF)	#20; Schmidt (3B)	#19; Luzinski (LF)	#6; Moreland (DH)	#31; Maddox (CF)	#9; Trillo (2B)	#10; Bowa (SS)	#8; Boone (C)
6	October 21	KC	#27; Smith (LF)	#14; Rose (1B)	#20; Schmidt (3B)	#21; McBride (RF)	#19; Luzinski (DH)	#31; Maddox (CF)	#9; Trillo (2B)	#10; Bowa (SS)	#8; Boone (C)

==== Defensive Lineup ====
1980 Postseason Defensive Lineup game log
NL Championship Series vs. Houston Astros

#	Date	Opponent	C	1B	2B	3B	SS	LF	CF	RF	P
1	October 7	HOU	#8; Boone	#14; Rose	#9; Trillo	#20; Schmidt	#10; Bowa	#19; Luzinski	#31; Maddox	#21; McBride	#32; Carlton
2	October 8	HOU	#8; Boone	#14; Rose	#9; Trillo	#20; Schmidt	#10; Bowa	#19; Luzinski	#31; Maddox	#21; McBride	#41; Ruthven
3	October 10	@ HOU	#8; Boone	#14; Rose	#9; Trillo	#20; Schmidt	#10; Bowa	#19; Luzinski	#31; Maddox	#21; McBride	#38; Christenson
4	October 11	@ HOU	#8; Boone	#14; Rose	#9; Trillo	#20; Schmidt	#10; Bowa	#27; Smith	#31; Maddox	#21; McBride	#32; Carlton
5	October 12	@ HOU	#8; Boone	#14; Rose	#9; Trillo	#20; Schmidt	#10; Bowa	#19; Luzinski	#31; Maddox	#21; McBride	#50; Bystrom

World Series vs. Kansas City Royals

#	Date	Opponent	C	1B	2B	3B	SS	LF	CF	RF	P
1	October 14	KC	#8; Boone	#14; Rose	#9; Trillo	#20; Schmidt	#10; Bowa	#27; Smith	#31; Maddox	#21; McBride	#41; Walk
2	October 15	KC	#8; Boone	#14; Rose	#9; Trillo	#20; Schmidt	#10; Bowa	#27; Smith	#31; Maddox	#21; McBride	#32; Carlton
3	October 17	@ KC	#8; Boone	#14; Rose	#9; Trillo	#20; Schmidt	#10; Bowa	#27; Smith	#31; Maddox	#21; McBride	#41; Ruthven
4	October 18	@ KC	#8; Boone	#14; Rose	#9; Trillo	#20; Schmidt	#10; Bowa	#25; Unser	#31; Maddox	#21; McBride	#38; Christenson
5	October 19	@ KC	#8; Boone	#14; Rose	#9; Trillo	#20; Schmidt	#10; Bowa	#19; Luzinski	#31; Maddox	#21; McBride	#50; Bystrom
6	October 21	KC	#8; Boone	#14; Rose	#9; Trillo	#20; Schmidt	#10; Bowa	#27; Smith	#31; Maddox	#21; McBride	#32; Carlton

== Game Umpires ==
=== Regular Season ===
1980 Regular Season Umpire game log
April

#	Date	Opponent	HP	1B	2B	3B
1	April 11	MTL	#5; Bob Engel (crew chief)	#3; Jerry Dale	#17; Paul Runge	#15; Jim Quick
2	April 12	MTL	#3; Jerry Dale	#17; Paul Runge	#15; Jim Quick	#5; Bob Engel (crew chief)
3	April 13	MTL	#17; Paul Runge	#15; Jim Quick	#5; Bob Engel (crew chief)	#3; Jerry Dale
6	April 18	@ MTL	#19; Terry Tata	#16; Dutch Rennert	#9; John Kibler (crew chief)	#6; Bruce Froemming
7	April 19	@ MTL	#16; Dutch Rennert	#9; John Kibler (crew chief)	#6; Bruce Froemming	#19; Terry Tata
8	April 20	@ MTL	#9; John Kibler (crew chief)	#6; Bruce Froemming	#19; Terry Tata	#16; Dutch Rennert

May

#	Date	Opponent	HP	1B	2B	3B
17	May 2	LA	#22; Joe West	#24; Bill Williams (crew chief)	#13; Paul Pryor	#10; John McSherry
18	May 3	LA	#24; Bill Williams (crew chief)	#13; Paul Pryor	#10; John McSherry	#22; Joe West
19	May 4	LA	#13; Paul Pryor	#10; John McSherry	#22; Joe West	#24; Bill Williams (crew chief)
27	May 16	@ HOU	#17; Paul Runge	#15; Jim Quick	#3; Jerry Dale (crew chief)	#29; Lanny Harris
28	May 17	@ HOU	#15; Jim Quick	#3; Jerry Dale (crew chief)	#29; Lanny Harris	#17; Paul Runge
29	May 18	@ HOU	#3; Jerry Dale	#5; Bob Engel (crew chief)	#17; Paul Runge	#15; Jim Quick
33	May 23	HOU	#19; Terry Tata	#9; John Kibler (crew chief)	#18; Dick Stello	#6; Bruce Froemming
34	May 24	HOU	#9; John Kibler (crew chief)	#18; Dick Stello	#6; Bruce Froemming	#19; Terry Tata
35	May 25	HOU	#18; Dick Stello	#6; Bruce Froemming	#19; Terry Tata	#9; John Kibler (crew chief)

June

#	Date	Opponent	HP	1B	2B	3B
56	June 16	@ LA	#13; Paul Pryor	#10; John McSherry	#22; Joe West	#24; Bill Williams (crew chief)
57	June 17	@ LA	#10; John McSherry	#22; Joe West	#24; Bill Williams (crew chief)	#13; Paul Pryor
62	June 24	MTL	#4; Satch Davidson (crew chief)	#26; Dave Pallone	#16; Dutch Rennert	#11; Ed Montague
63	June 25	MTL	#26; Dave Pallone	#16; Dutch Rennert	#11; Ed Montague	#4; Satch Davidson (crew chief)
64	June 26	MTL	#16; Dutch Rennert	#11; Ed Montague	#4; Satch Davidson (crew chief)	#26; Dave Pallone
69	June 30	@ MTL	#7; Eric Gregg	#14; Frank Pulli	#28; Fred Brocklander	#21; Harry Wendelstedt (crew chief)

July

#	Date	Opponent	HP	1B	2B	3B
70	July 1	@ MTL	#14; Frank Pulli	#28; Fred Brocklander	#21; Harry Wendelstedt (crew chief)	#7; Eric Gregg
71	July 2	@ MTL	#28; Fred Brocklander	#21; Harry Wendelstedt (crew chief)	#7; Eric Gregg	#14; Frank Pulli
82	July 15	@ HOU	#27; Steve Fields	#17; Paul Runge	#5; Bob Engel (crew chief)	#15; Jim Quick
83	July 16	@ HOU	#5; Bob Engel (crew chief)	#15; Jim Quick	#17; Paul Runge	#27; Steve Fields
84	July 17	@ HOU	#17; Paul Runge	#15; Jim Quick	#27; Steve Fields	#5; Bob Engel (crew chief)
96	July 28	HOU	#8; Doug Harvey (crew chief)	#28; Fred Brocklander	#2; Jerry Crawford	#12; Andy Olsen
97	July 29	HOU	#2; Jerry Crawford	#12; Andy Olsen	#28; Fred Brocklander	#8; Doug Harvey (crew chief)
98	July 30	HOU	#28; Fred Brocklander	#8; Doug Harvey (crew chief)	#2; Jerry Crawford	#12; Andy Olsen

August

#	Date	Opponent	HP	1B	2B	3B
122	August 25	LA	#29; Lanny Harris	#13; Paul Pryor	#10; John McSherry	#22; Joe West
123	August 26	LA	#13; Paul Pryor	#10; John McSherry	#22; Joe West	#29; Lanny Harris
124	August 27	LA	#10; John McSherry	#22; Joe West	#29; Lanny Harris	#13; Paul Pryor

September

#	Date	Opponent	HP	1B	2B	3B
132	September 4	@ LA	#4; Satch Davidson	#11; Ed Montague	#26; Dave Pallone	#20; Ed Vargo (crew chief)
133	September 5	@ LA	#11; Ed Montague	#26; Dave Pallone	#20; Ed Vargo (crew chief)	#4; Satch Davidson
134	September 6	@ LA	#26; Dave Pallone	#20; Ed Vargo (crew chief)	#4; Satch Davidson	#11; Ed Montague
135	September 7	@ LA	#20; Ed Vargo (crew chief)	#11; Ed Montague	#4; Satch Davidson	#26; Dave Pallone
153	September 26	MTL	#16; Dutch Rennert	#21; Harry Wendelstedt	#23; Lee Weyer (crew chief)	#7; Eric Gregg
154	September 27	MTL	#21; Harry Wendelstedt	#23; Lee Weyer (crew chief)	#7; Eric Gregg	#16; Dutch Rennert
155	September 28	MTL	#23; Lee Weyer (crew chief)	#7; Eric Gregg	#16; Dutch Rennert	#21; Harry Wendelstedt

October

#	Date	Opponent	HP	1B	2B	3B
160	October 3	@ MTL	#19; Terry Tata	#6; Bruce Froemming	#18; Dick Stello	#9; John Kibler (crew chief)
161	October 4	@ MTL	#6; Bruce Froemming	#18; Dick Stello	#9; John Kibler (crew chief)	#19; Terry Tata
162	October 5	@ MTL	#18; Dick Stello	#9; John Kibler (crew chief)	#19; Terry Tata	#6; Bruce Froemming

=== Postseason ===
1980 Postseason Umpire game log
NL Championship Series vs. Houston Astros

#	Date	Opponent	HP	1B	2B	3B	LF	RF
1	October 7	HOU	#5; Bob Engel	#19; Terry Tata	#6; Bruce Froemming	#8; Doug Harvey	#20; Ed Vargo (crew chief)	#2; Jerry Crawford
2	October 8	HOU	#19; Terry Tata	#6; Bruce Froemming	#8; Doug Harvey	#20; Ed Vargo (crew chief)	#2; Jerry Crawford	#5; Bob Engel
3	October 10	@ HOU	#6; Bruce Froemming	#8; Doug Harvey	#20; Ed Vargo (crew chief)	#2; Jerry Crawford	#5; Bob Engel	#19; Terry Tata
4	October 11	@ HOU	#8; Doug Harvey	#20; Ed Vargo (crew chief)	#2; Jerry Crawford	#5; Bob Engel	#19; Terry Tata	#6; Bruce Froemming
5	October 12	@ HOU	#20; Ed Vargo (crew chief)	#2; Jerry Crawford	#5; Bob Engel	#19; Terry Tata	#6; Bruce Froemming	#8; Doug Harvey

World Series vs. Kansas City Royals

#	Date	Opponent	HP	1B	2B	3B	LF	RF
1	October 14	KC	#21; Harry Wendelstedt (NL) (crew chief)	#9; Bill Kunkel (AL)	#13; Paul Pryor (NL)	#11; Don Denkinger (AL)	#16; Dutch Rennert (NL)	#2; Nick Bremigan (AL)
2	October 15	KC	#9; Bill Kunkel (AL)	#13; Paul Pryor (NL)	#11; Don Denkinger (AL)	#16; Dutch Rennert (NL)	#2; Nick Bremigan (AL)	#21; Harry Wendelstedt (NL) (crew chief)
3	October 17	@ KC	#13; Paul Pryor (NL)	#11; Don Denkinger (AL)	#16; Dutch Rennert (NL)	#2; Nick Bremigan (AL)	#21; Harry Wendelstedt (NL) (crew chief)	#9; Bill Kunkel (AL)
4	October 18	@ KC	#11; Don Denkinger (AL)	#16; Dutch Rennert (NL)	#2; Nick Bremigan (AL)	#21; Harry Wendelstedt (NL) (crew chief)	#9; Bill Kunkel (AL)	#13; Paul Pryor (NL)
5	October 19	@ KC	#16; Dutch Rennert (NL)	#2; Nick Bremigan (AL)	#21; Harry Wendelstedt (NL) (crew chief)	#9; Bill Kunkel (AL)	#13; Paul Pryor (NL)	#11; Don Denkinger (AL)
6	October 21	KC	#2; Nick Bremigan (AL)	#21; Harry Wendelstedt (NL) (crew chief)	#9; Bill Kunkel (AL)	#13; Paul Pryor (NL)	#11; Don Denkinger (AL)	#16; Dutch Rennert (NL)

== Player stats ==
= Indicates team leader

=== Batting ===
==== Starters by position ====
Note: Pos = Position; G = Games played; AB = At bats; R = Runs; H = Hits; 2B = Doubles; 3B = Triples; Avg. = Batting average; HR = Home runs; RBI = Runs batted in; SB = Stolen bases

Pos	Player	G	AB	R	H	2B	3B	Avg.	HR	RBI	SB
C	Bob Boone	141	480	34	110	23	1	.229	9	55	3
1B	Pete Rose	162	655	95	185	42	1	.282	1	64	12
2B	Manny Trillo	141	531	68	155	25	9	.292	7	43	8
3B	Mike Schmidt	150	548	104	157	25	8	.286	48	121	12
SS	Larry Bowa	147	540	57	144	16	4	.267	2	39	21
LF	Greg Luzinski	106	368	44	84	19	1	.228	19	56	3
CF	Garry Maddox	143	549	59	142	31	3	.259	11	73	25
RF	Bake McBride	137	554	68	171	33	10	.309	9	87	13

==== Other batters ====
Note: G = Games played; AB = At bats; R = Runs; H = Hits; Avg. = Batting average; HR = Home runs; RBI = Runs batted in; SB = Stolen bases

Player	G	AB	R	H	Avg.	HR	RBI	SB
Lonnie Smith	100	298	69	101	.339	3	20	33
Keith Moreland	62	159	13	50	.314	4	29	3
Greg Gross	127	154	19	37	.240	0	12	1
Del Unser	96	110	15	29	.264	0	10	0
Ramón Avilés	51	101	12	28	.277	2	9	0
John Vukovich	49	62	4	10	.161	0	5	0
George Vukovich	78	58	6	13	.224	0	8	0
Luis Aguayo	20	47	7	13	.277	1	8	1
Bob Dernier	10	7	5	4	.571	0	1	3
Jay Loviglio	16	5	7	0	.000	0	0	1
Tim McCarver	6	5	2	1	.200	0	2	0
Orlando Isales	3	5	1	2	.400	0	3	0
Ozzie Virgil	1	5	1	1	.200	0	0	0
Don McCormack	2	1	0	1	1.000	0	0	0

=== Pitching ===
==== Starting pitchers ====
Note: G = Games pitched; IP = Innings pitched; W = Wins; L = Losses; ERA = Earned run average; BB = Walks allowed; SO = Strikeouts

Player	G	IP	W	L	ERA	BB	SO
Steve Carlton	38	304.0	24	9	2.34	90	286
Dick Ruthven	33	223.1	17	10	3.55	74	86
Bob Walk	27	151.2	11	7	4.57	71	94
Randy Lerch	30	150.0	4	14	5.16	55	57
Nino Espinosa	12	76.1	3	5	3.77	19	13
Larry Christenson	14	73.2	5	1	4.03	27	49
Marty Bystrom	6	36.0	5	0	1.50	9	21

==== Other pitchers ====
Note: G = Games pitched; IP = Innings pitched; W = Wins; L = Losses; ERA = Earned run average; BB = Walks allowed; SO = Strikeouts

Player	G	IP	W	L	ERA	SO
Dan Larson	12	45.2	0	5	3.15	17
Mark Davis	2	7.0	0	0	2.57	5

==== Relief pitchers ====
Note: G = Games pitched; IP = Innings pitched; W = Wins; L = Losses; SV = Saves; ERA = Earned run average; SO = Strikeouts

Player	G	IP	W	L	SV	ERA	SO
Tug McGraw	57	92.1	5	4	20	1.46	75
Ron Reed	55	91.1	7	5	9	4.04	9
Dickie Noles	48	81.0	1	4	6	3.89	57
Kevin Saucier	40	50.0	7	3	0	3.42	25
Warren Brusstar	28	38.2	2	2	0	3.72	21
Lerrin LaGrow	25	39.0	0	2	3	4.15	21
Sparky Lyle	10	14.0	0	0	2	1.93	6
Scott Munninghoff	4	6.0	0	0	0	4.50	2

== Postseason ==
=== National League Championship Series ===
==== Game 1 ====
October 7: Veterans Stadium, Philadelphia

Team	1	2	3	4	5	6	7	8	9	R	H	E
Houston	0	0	1	0	0	0	0	0	0	1	7	0
Philadelphia	0	0	0	0	0	2	1	0	X	3	8	1
W: Steve Carlton (1–0) L: Ken Forsch (0–1) S: Tug McGraw (1)
HR: HOU – None PHI – Greg Luzinski (1)
Pitchers: HOU – Forsch PHI – Carlton, McGraw (8)
Attendance: 65,277

==== Game 2 ====
October 8: Veterans Stadium, Philadelphia

Team	1	2	3	4	5	6	7	8	9	10	R	H	E
Houston	0	0	1	0	0	0	1	1	0	4	7	8	1
Philadelphia	0	0	0	2	0	0	0	1	0	1	4	14	2
W: Frank LaCorte (1–0) L: Ron Reed (0–1) S: Joaquín Andújar (1)
HR: HOU – None PHI – None
Pitchers: HOU – Ryan, Sambito (7), Smith (7), LaCorte (9), Andújar (10) PHI – Ruthven, McGraw (8), Reed (9), Saucier (10)
Attendance: 65,476

==== Game 3 ====
October 10: Astrodome, Houston, Texas

Team	1	2	3	4	5	6	7	8	9	10	11	R	H	E
Philadelphia	0	0	0	0	0	0	0	0	0	0	0	0	7	1
Houston	0	0	0	0	0	0	0	0	0	0	1	1	6	1
W: Dave Smith (1–0) L: Tug McGraw (0–1) S: None
HR: PHI – None HOU – None
Pitchers: PHI – Christenson, Noles (7), McGraw (8) HOU – Niekro, Smith (11)
Attendance: 44,443

==== Game 4 ====
October 11: Astrodome, Houston, Texas

Team	1	2	3	4	5	6	7	8	9	10	R	H	E
Philadelphia	0	0	0	0	0	0	0	3	0	2	5	13	0
Houston	0	0	0	1	1	0	0	0	1	0	3	5	2
W: Warren Brusstar (1–0) L: Joe Sambito (0–1) S: Tug McGraw (2)
HR: PHI – None HOU – None
Pitchers: PHI – Carlton, Noles (6), Saucier (7), Reed (7), Brusstar (8), McGraw (10) HOU – Ruhle, Smith (8), Sambito (8)
Attendance: 44,952

==== Game 5 ====
October 12: Astrodome, Houston, Texas

Team	1	2	3	4	5	6	7	8	9	10	R	H	E
Philadelphia	0	2	0	0	0	0	0	5	0	1	8	13	2
Houston	1	0	0	0	0	1	3	2	0	0	7	14	0
W: Dick Ruthven (1–0) L: Frank LaCorte (1–1) S: None
HR: PHI – None HOU – None
Pitchers: PHI – Bystrom, Brusstar (6), Christenson (7), Reed (7), McGraw (8), Ruthven (9) HOU – Ryan, Sambito (8), Forsch (8), LaCorte (9)
Attendance: 44,802

=== World Series ===
When the modern-day World Series began in 1903, the National and American Leagues each had eight teams. With their victory in the 1980 World Series, the Phillies became the last of the "Original Sixteen" franchises to win a Series. The 1980 World Series was the first World Series to be played entirely on artificial turf. Prior to 1980, the Phillies hadn't won a World Series game since Game 1 of the 1915 World Series against the Boston Red Sox.

The series offered many intriguing storylines. Phillies pitcher Bob Walk became the first rookie to start the first game of a World Series since Joe Black of the Brooklyn Dodgers in 1952. The 1980 World Series was the first of numerous World Series that journeyman outfielder Lonnie Smith (then with the Phillies) participated in. He was also a part of the 1982 World Series (as a member of the St. Louis Cardinals), 1985 World Series (as a member of the Kansas City Royals), and the 1991 and 1992 World Series as a member of the Atlanta Braves.

Game 6 would be the culmination for the Phillies' first championship. Philadelphia scored two in the third on a Mike Schmidt single. It was all that Steve Carlton and Tug McGraw would need for the 4–1 win. Kansas City threatened by loading the bases in the eighth and the ninth innings before Tug McGraw struck out Willie Wilson for the third out in the final inning.

While Mike Schmidt was the official MVP of the 1980 World Series, the Babe Ruth Award (another World Series MVP) was given to Tug McGraw. As of 2019, this is the last World Series in which both participating franchises had yet to win a World Series in their history. This was the first time that had happened since 1920.

The entire state of Pennsylvania, not just Philadelphia, celebrated the Phillies' win. Minutes after the final out, Governor Dick Thornburgh declared the next day "Philadelphia Phillies Day."

NL Philadelphia Phillies (4) vs. AL Kansas City Royals (2)
Game	Score	Date	Location	Attendance	Time of Game
1	Royals 6, Phillies 7	October 14	Veterans Stadium (Philadelphia)	65,791	3:01
2	Royals 4, Phillies 6	October 15	Veterans Stadium (Philadelphia)	65,775	3:01
3	Phillies 3, Royals 4 (10 inns)	October 17	Royals Stadium (Kansas City)	42,380	3:19
4	Phillies 3, Royals 5	October 18	Royals Stadium (Kansas City)	42,363	2:37
5	Phillies 4, Royals 3	October 19	Royals Stadium (Kansas City)	42,369	2:51
6	Royals 1, Phillies 4	October 21	Veterans Stadium (Philadelphia)	65,838	3:00

=== Composite box score ===
1980 World Series (4–2): Philadelphia Phillies (N.L.) over Kansas City Royals (A.L.)

Team	1	2	3	4	5	6	7	8	9	10	R	H	E
Philadelphia Phillies	0	2	7	3	5	1	1	6	2	0	27	59	2
Kansas City Royals	5	3	2	1	1	3	4	3	0	1	23	60	7
Total Attendance: 324,516 Average Attendance: 54,086
Winning Player's Share: – $34,693, Losing Player's Share – $32,212 * Includes Playoffs and World Series

== Awards and honors ==
In 1980, Mike Schmidt won the National League's Most Valuable Player Award in a unanimous vote. He led the league in home runs with 48 (by a margin of 13 over his nearest competitor). Schmidt was also selected as MVP of the World Series, after hitting two homers and driving in seven runs as his team won their first World Series Championship over the George Brett-led Kansas City Royals.

Steve Carlton received the National League Cy Young Award.

Tug McGraw received the Babe Ruth Award.

Manny Trillo was honored as the MVP of the National League Championship Series.

=== All-Stars ===
1980 Major League Baseball All-Star Game

- Steve Carlton, reserve
- Pete Rose, reserve
- Mike Schmidt, reserve

== Farm system ==
Level	Team	League	Manager
AAA	Oklahoma City 89ers	American Association	Jim Snyder
AA	Reading Phillies	Eastern League	Ron Clark
A	Peninsula Pilots*	Carolina League	Bill Dancy
A	Spartanburg Phillies	South Atlantic League	Tom Harmon
A-Short Season	Bend Phillies	Northwest League	P. J. Carey
Rookie	Helena Phillies	Pioneer League	Roly de Armas

* League Champions

== Other Philadelphia sports teams of the same era ==
In the National Hockey League, the Philadelphia Flyers reached the Stanley Cup Finals in May 1980 before losing four games to two to the New York Islanders.

In the National Basketball Association also in May 1980, the Philadelphia 76ers reached the NBA Finals before losing four games to two to the Los Angeles Lakers.

The 1980 Philadelphia Eagles would qualify for Super Bowl XV, where they were defeated 27–10 by the Oakland Raiders.
