= Bake McBride =

American baseball player (born 1949)

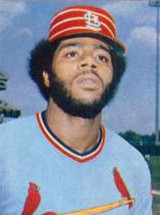
- Outfielder
- Born: February 3, 1949 (age 77); Fulton, Missouri, U.S.
- Batted: Left Threw: Right

MLB debut
- July 26, 1973, for the St. Louis Cardinals

Last MLB appearance
- October 1, 1983, for the Cleveland Indians

MLB statistics
- Batting average: .299
- Home runs: 63
- Runs batted in: 430
- Stats at Baseball Reference

Teams
- St. Louis Cardinals (1973–1977); Philadelphia Phillies (1977–1981); Cleveland Indians (1982–1983)

Career highlights and awards
- All-Star (1976); World Series champion (1980); NL Rookie of the Year (1974); Philadelphia Phillies Wall of Fame

Arnold Ray McBride (born February 3, 1949), nicknamed "Shake 'n Bake" and "the Callaway Kid", is an American former professional baseball outfielder, who played in Major League Baseball (MLB) for the St. Louis Cardinals, Philadelphia Phillies, and Cleveland Indians between 1973 and 1983. He had the most success with the Phillies teams of the late 1970s and early 1980s.

After attending Fulton High School and Westminster College in Missouri, McBride debuted for the Cardinals in 1973. He was the 1974 National League Rookie of the Year, and subsequently represented the National League (NL) in the 1976 MLB All-Star Game. McBride was a member of the world champion 1980 Phillies team, hitting a three-run home run in the first game of that year's World Series.

Though McBride ran with impressive speed, more than half of his 11 MLB seasons were shortened by injury or illness. He had surgeries on both of his knees during his playing career, and he missed almost all of the 1982 season with an eye infection related to his use of contact lenses. After his playing career ended, McBride was a minor league coach for the New York Mets and the Cardinals.

== Early life ==
McBride was born in Fulton, Missouri, to Arnold McBride and Wanna Robinson McBride. The elder Arnold McBride had been a pitcher for the Negro league baseball team known as the Kansas City Monarchs. Bake McBride starred in football at Fulton High School, earning all-state honors, and he also played basketball and ran track. Fulton High School did not offer a baseball program.

McBride attended Westminster College in Missouri, where he was a baseball, basketball, and track athlete. He set the school record in the 200-meter dash. McBride pitched in college, but when he attended a tryout session with the St. Louis Cardinals, personnel at the tryout were not interested in McBride's pitching. They thought his running ability held promise. McBride was selected by the Cardinals in the 37th round of the 1970 MLB draft. He was the last player selected and signed in the 1970 MLB draft to play in the Major Leagues. Though McBride left college early to enter professional baseball, he later graduated from Westminster.

By 1972, McBride had made his way through the minor leagues to the Cardinals' Class AA affiliate in Little Rock. Though he was successful there and he received a promotion to the Class AAA team in Tulsa, he was initially hesitant to report there, wondering whether he was ready for Class AAA baseball. In his first at bat at the Class AAA level, McBride hit a ball off of the outfield wall and seemed to collect a triple, but he was called out for failing to touch second base.

== Early years with the Cardinals ==
McBride made his major league debut for the Cardinals in 1973, but he retained his rookie status after only appearing in 40 games that year. He became known for a distinctive appearance, as he wore one of the largest Afro hairstyles in the major leagues. When he stepped to home plate to bat, McBride made a ritual of wiping away the chalk lines that made up the batter's box. He used an unconventional batting stance, placing his weight on his front foot rather than on his back foot.

Late in the 1974 season, McBride scored the winning run in a 25-inning game against the New York Mets. He hit an infield single and then scored from first base when pitcher Hank Webb's pickoff attempt went into right field and the catcher made an error while receiving the throw to home plate. At the time, the game was the second longest in MLB history at seven hours and four minutes. He finished the 1974 season with 173 base hits, 30 stolen bases, and a .309 batting average, and was named the National League's Rookie of the Year. He was the first Cardinal to earn the award since Bill Virdon in 1955.

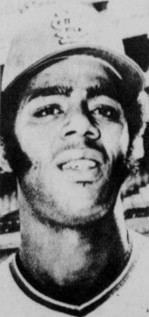
McBride, circa 1974

As a young Cardinals player, McBride said that he learned a great deal from the influence of teammate Lou Brock. McBride felt that Brock should have won the 1974 Most Valuable Player Award. Brock stole 118 bases that year, which broke the single-season league record. When combined with McBride's 30 steals, the total set a single-season MLB record for stolen bases by two teammates. Other than Brock and McBride, no St. Louis Cardinal had stolen 30 bases in a season since 1927. The 1974 Cardinals outfielders (McBride, Brock and Reggie Smith) all hit over .300, the first time since 1902 that the team's three starting outfielders all achieved that mark.

In 1975, McBride moved from the fifth spot to the third spot in the Cardinals' batting order. He suffered an early-season shoulder injury that caused him to miss almost a month of the season. He returned, but injured both ankles in the summer; his left ankle was hurt on a slide into a catcher's shin guard, and a few days later he fouled a pitch off of his right ankle during batting practice. By late July, McBride was hitting only .255 and he had 14 stolen bases on the season, a slower pace than the year before. McBride hit better late in the season to finish with a .300 batting average on the year.

McBride, then known as "The Callaway Kid" after his home county, completed a conditioning program in the offseason to strengthen his slender physique, gaining ten pounds before the 1976 season and starting strong in April. McBride was selected as the only representative from the Cardinals in the 1976 MLB All-Star Game. He struggled with shoulder and knee injuries that year. In August, he was taken out of the lineup and the team announced that he would undergo season-ending surgery to repair cartilage in his knee. He had a .335 batting average when he was sidelined by the injury.

Before the 1977 season, the Cardinals hired Vern Rapp as the team's new manager. Rapp was known as a disciplinarian and he prohibited the players from having facial hair, which caused conflict with McBride and with teammate Al Hrabosky. In late May 1977, the Cardinals signed McBride to a three-year contract. About three weeks after McBride signed his new contract, McBride and Steve Waterbury were traded to the Philadelphia Phillies for Tom Underwood, Dane Iorg, and Rick Bosetti. Broadcaster Jack Buck said that Rapp undoubtedly forced McBride's trade to the Phillies.

== Philadelphia Phillies ==
McBride surged to a .339 batting average during his time with the 1977 Phillies. The team went 69-33 after acquiring McBride and they made the playoffs. McBride had previously played center field, but since Garry Maddox occupied that position in Philadelphia, McBride moved to right field. He was well-liked by Phillies fans, and they nicknamed him "Shake 'n Bake".

McBride hit for his lowest career batting average in 1978 (.269), and he played in only 122 games, partly because of injuries and partly because manager Danny Ozark employed a platoon system. Before the 1979 season, McBride became the subject of trade rumors. If the Phillies had been unable to sign him to an extension, they would have lost him to free agency after that year. General manager Paul Owens said that he would trade McBride if they could not negotiate a contract extension. He was nearly dealt along with Tug McGraw and Larry Christenson to the Texas Rangers for Sparky Lyle and Johnny Grubb at the 1979 Winter Meetings in Toronto, but the proposed transaction was nixed by Phillies owner Ruly Carpenter over a deferred payments clause in Lyle's contract. McBride re-signed with the Phillies.

In July 1980, Bill Lyon of The Philadelphia Inquirer wrote that many fans unfairly stereotyped McBride as a lazy player because of his bad knees and his low-key personality. McBride ran with a lopsided gait, which fans interpreted as a lack of effort. Lyon wrote that because McBride did not talk about his injuries a lot to the public, most people did not realize that his knee joint had significantly eroded and that he was "essentially, a one-legged player." Lyon said that McBride's Afro hairstyle and his isolated nature furthered the stereotypes that many fans held. McBride said that he had never been a man who showed much emotion, and he thought it would be hypocritical if he tried to look more intense just to appease the fans.

Despite the pain in his feet and knees, McBride was characterized by manager Dallas Green as the most consistent player on the team in 1980. The Phillies went to the 1980 World Series, and in the first game, McBride's three-run home run put the Phillies ahead of the Kansas City Royals. The Phillies won the game and won the World Series in six games. McBride hit .304 (7 hits in 23 at bats) in his only career World Series. During the strike-shortened 1981 season, McBride missed most of May because of knee problems. He underwent arthroscopy on his left knee just before the strike. He had surgery on his right knee in November.

== Later career ==
On February 16, 1982, McBride was traded to the Cleveland Indians for Sid Monge. McBride said that he would have to become accustomed to pitchers in the American League, but he thought that the grass field in Cleveland would provide a more favorable playing surface for his surgically repaired knees than the artificial turf in Philadelphia.

The trade to Cleveland made McBride an unwitting participant in controversy. Because Monge had refused a smaller contract offer from the Phillies when he was a free agent before the season, Marvin Miller of the Major League Baseball Players Association (MLBPA) criticized the trade as an example of collusive efforts between baseball owners to sidestep the rules surrounding free agency. Compensation for free agents had been a contentious issue in labor negotiations between owners and the MLBPA.

McBride began the 1982 season as the starting right fielder for the Indians, but he suffered an eye infection and did not play after May 21. He had started the season hitting .365 in 27 games. McBride said that the eye infection was related to his contact lenses and he thought that his recovery had been delayed by trying to wear other types of contacts. He said that he had worn hard contact lenses since 1970, and that he had damaged his corneas by wearing contacts all of the time. McBride said that his corneal issue was such that he was unable to switch from contact lenses to glasses while his eyes healed.

Just before the 1983 season, McBride said that he had not had eye problems since January, when he began wearing contact lenses made for him by doctors in Boston. He played in 70 games in the 1983 season, twice ending up on the disabled list. He filed for free agency in October 1983.

After his playing career, McBride retired to Florissant, Missouri, where he briefly owned a liquor store. He was enjoying the time he could spend with his family, but the New York Mets called him with a coaching opportunity. In 1985, the organization hired McBride as an outfield and baserunning coach for their minor league system. He stayed with the organization for seven years.

In 1989, McBride came out of retirement and played for the St. Petersburg Pelicans and Orlando Juice of the Senior Professional Baseball Association. He batted .296 in 29 games between both clubs; 3 games with St. Petersburg and 26 games with Orlando.

In the 1990s, McBride was a minor league hitting coach for the Cardinals.

== Personal life ==
McBride married the former Celeste Woodley. The couple had three children. By 1976, McBride had opened a youth center in Fulton. He lived in St. Louis during the baseball offseasons. His cousin, Ron McBride, played college football at the University of Missouri and then appeared in the National Football League.

Early in his career, McBride said that he could not explain how he had come to be known as Bake.

== Career statistics ==
Games	PA	AB	R	H	2B	3B	HR	RBI	SB	BB	AVG	OBP	SLG	FLD%
1071	4202	3853	548	1153	167	55	63	430	183	248	.299	.345	.420	.989

In the postseason covering 22 games from 1977 to 1981, McBride batted .244 (21-for-86) with 8 runs, 3 home runs and 8 RBI.
