= Scott Munninghoff =

American baseball player

- Pitcher
- Born: December 5, 1958 (age 67); Cincinnati, Ohio, U.S.
- Batted: Right Threw: Right

MLB debut
- April 13, 1980, for the Philadelphia Phillies

Last MLB appearance
- May 4, 1980, for the Philadelphia Phillies

MLB statistics
- Games played: 4
- Innings pitched: 6
- Win–loss record: 0–0
- Earned run average: 4.50
- Strikeouts: 2
- Stats at Baseball Reference

Teams
- Philadelphia Phillies (1980)

Scott Andrew Munninghoff (born December 5, 1958) is an American former professional baseball pitcher, who played briefly in Major League Baseball (MLB) for the Philadelphia Phillies during the 1980 season. Listed at 6 ft 0 in (1.83 m), 175 pounds (79 kg), he batted and threw right-handed.

Munninghoff was drafted by the Phillies in the first round of the 1977 Major League Baseball draft (22nd overall) out of Purcell Marian High School. His professional career started off poorly, as he went 0–5 with a 5.52 earned run average for the New York–Penn League's Auburn Phillies in 1977. However, he improved to 17–7 with a 2.30 ERA in 26 starts for the 1978 Spartanburg Phillies.

He debuted with the Philadelphia Phillies on April 13, 1980, pitching two scoreless innings out of the bullpen against the Montreal Expos. On April 22, in his first and only at bat, Munninghoff hit a triple (and scored a run), joining Chuck Lindstrom (1958), Eduardo Rodríguez (1973), and Eric Cammack (2000) as the only players to accomplish this feat in major league history.

After a poor outing against the Los Angeles Dodgers, in which he gave up a single, wild pitch and walked two (one of which occurred with the bases loaded) Munninghoff was reassigned to the triple A Oklahoma City 89ers. In four relief appearances, Munninghoff posted a 4.50 ERA and did not have a decision or save, giving up three earned runs on eight hits and five walks while striking out two in 6.0 innings of work.

Munninghoff spent the remainder of the 1980 season and all of 1981 with Oklahoma. On December 9, 1981, he was sent to the Cleveland Indians in completion of an earlier deal made on November 20, 1981, in which the Phillies sent a player to be named later to the Indians; the Indians sent catcher Bo Díaz to the Phillies; the Phillies sent Lonnie Smith to the St. Louis Cardinals, and the Cardinals sent Silvio Martinez and Lary Sorensen to the Indians. He spent one season in the Indians' organization, and pitched several seasons of independent ball before becoming a coach at Purcell Marian.

As of 2010, Munninghoff owns a roofing company in Cincinnati, Ohio, where he lives with his wife and children.

== See also ==
- 1980 Philadelphia Phillies season
