= Eric Cammack =

American baseball player (born 1975)

- Pitcher
- Born: August 14, 1975; Nederland, Texas, U.S.
- Batted: Right Threw: Right

MLB debut
- April 28, 2000, for the New York Mets

Last MLB appearance
- September 29, 2000, for the New York Mets

MLB statistics
- Win–loss record: 0-0
- Earned run average: 6.30
- Strikeouts: 9
- Stats at Baseball Reference

Teams
- New York Mets (2000)

Eric Wade Cammack (born August 14, 1975) is an American former relief pitcher in Major League Baseball who played briefly for the New York Mets during the 2000 season. Listed at 6 ft 1 in (1.85 m), 180 lb., Cammack batted and threw right-handed. A native of Nederland, Texas, he was selected by the Mets in the 1997 MLB draft after playing college baseball for the Cardinals of Lamar University.

In eight relief appearances, Cammack posted a 6.30 earned run average and did not have a decision or saves, giving up seven runs on seven hits and 10 walks while striking out nine in 10.0 innings of work.

Cammack also pitched from 1997 through 2004 in the Mets, Astros and Athletics minor league systems. In 134 games, he collected a 24–15 record with a 3.17 ERA and 68 saves in 420 2/3 innings.

As a hitter, Cammack hit a triple in his first and only at bat (as well as his only plate appearance) joining Charlie Lindstrom (1958), Eduardo Rodríguez (1973), and Scott Munninghoff (1980) as the only players to hit a triple in their only career at bat (Lindstrom had 2 career plate appearances, but only had 1 at bat). Consequently, these players also have the highest slugging percentage in major league history, although it is not an official record, as the minimum plate appearances required to qualify for an official career MLB record is 3000.

== See also ==
- 2000 New York Mets season
