= Eduardo Rodríguez (right-handed pitcher) =

Puerto Rican baseball player (1952–2009)

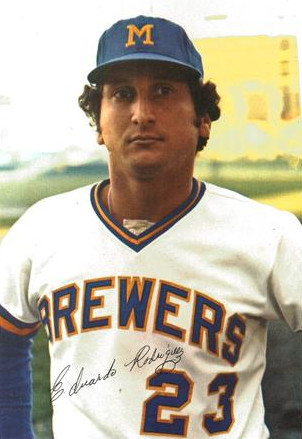
- Pitcher
- Born: March 6, 1952; Barceloneta, Puerto Rico
- Died: March 6, 2009 (aged 57); Barceloneta, Puerto Rico
- Batted: Right Threw: Right

MLB debut
- June 20, 1973, for the Milwaukee Brewers

Last MLB appearance
- September 17, 1979, for the Kansas City Royals

MLB statistics
- Win–loss record: 42–36
- Earned run average: 3.89
- Strikeouts: 430
- Saves: 32
- Stats at Baseball Reference

Teams
- Milwaukee Brewers (1973–1978); Kansas City Royals (1979)

Eduardo Rodríguez Reyes [Volanta] (March 6, 1952 – March 6, 2009) was a Puerto Rican professional baseball pitcher. He played in Major League Baseball from 1973 through 1979 for the Milwaukee Brewers (1973–78) and Kansas City Royals (1979), mostly as a relief pitcher. He also pitched in the Puerto Rico Baseball League for the Criollos de Caguas and Indios de Mayagüez. Listed at 6 ft 0 in (1.83 m) and 185 lb (84 kg), Rodríguez batted and threw right-handed. He was born in Barceloneta, Puerto Rico.

In a seven-season career, Rodríguez posted a 42–36 record with a 3.89 ERA and 32 saves in 264 appearances, including 39 starts, one shutout and seven complete games, giving up 317 earned runs on 681 hits and 323 walks while striking out 430 in 734 innings of work. As a hitter, Rodríguez belted a triple (and scored on an error) in his first and only major league at bat, joining Don Bennett (1930), Chuck Lindstrom (1958), Scott Munninghoff (1980), and Eric Cammack (2000) as the only players to accomplish this feat in major league history. He is also, along with the players mentioned before, tied for first in career slugging percentage (minimum 1 career plate appearance) at 3.000.

Rodríguez died at his Barceloneta home of a heart attack on his 57th birthday.

== See also ==
- List of Major League Baseball players from Puerto Rico
