= Lonnie Smith (baseball) =

American baseball player (born 1955)

- Smith with the St. Louis Cardinals in 1983
- Left fielder
- Born: December 22, 1955 (age 70); Chicago, Illinois, U.S.
- Batted: Right Threw: Right

MLB debut
- September 2, 1978, for the Philadelphia Phillies

Last MLB appearance
- August 10, 1994, for the Baltimore Orioles

MLB statistics
- Batting average: .288
- Home runs: 98
- Runs batted in: 533
- Stolen bases: 370
- Stats at Baseball Reference

Teams
- Philadelphia Phillies (1978–1981); St. Louis Cardinals (1982–1985); Kansas City Royals (1985–1987); Atlanta Braves (1988–1992); Pittsburgh Pirates (1993); Baltimore Orioles (1993–1994)

Career highlights and awards
- All-Star (1982); 3× World Series champion (1980, 1982, 1985)

Lonnie Smith (born December 22, 1955) is an American former Major League Baseball left fielder. He made his debut for the Philadelphia Phillies on September 2, 1978, and later played for the St. Louis Cardinals, Kansas City Royals, Atlanta Braves, Pittsburgh Pirates, and Baltimore Orioles. He overcame bouts with drug abuse to become one of the top base-stealers in baseball during the 1980s, with the seventh-most steals. He played on five pennant-winning teams, three of which won the World Series.

== Early life ==
Lonnie Smith was born on December 22, 1955, in Chicago, Illinois. He attended Centennial High School in Compton, California, where he excelled in baseball.

== Professional career ==
=== Draft and minor Leagues ===
Smith was drafted by the Philadelphia Phillies in the first round round (3rd overall) in the 1974 MLB June Amateur Draft. Smith began his minor league career with Auburn in the New York–Penn League in 1974. The following year, he led the league with 150 hits, 114 runs, and 56 stolen bases while playing for Spartanburg. In 1978, he led the league with 66 stolen bases while playing for Oklahoma City and scored 106 runs the following year again with Oklahoma City.

=== Philadelphia Phillies (1978–1981) ===
After brief trials with the Phillies in 1978 and 1979, Smith broke into the team's lineup in 1980, batting .339 in 100 games. The Phillies won the National League pennant and defeated the Kansas City Royals in the World Series. Smith's performance was strong enough for him to finish third in the Rookie of the Year balloting following the season. He continued to play well in the strike-shortened 1981 season, hitting .324.

=== St. Louis Cardinals (1982–1985) ===
Smith was traded to the St. Louis Cardinals in November 1981, for Lary Sorensen, in a deal which eventually netted the Phillies Bo Díaz. Smith continued to hit well in 1982, and to have a good on-base percentage. In fact, 1982 was a high-water year for Smith in several different ways: Smith was in the MLB All-Star Game for the only time in his career in 1982. He had a batting average of .307, and on-base percentage of .381. He led the National League with 120 runs scored, which was the only time that he scored 100+ runs in a season during his major league career. Smith also set career highs in 1982 with 592 at-bats, 182 hits, 35 doubles, and 257 total bases during the regular season. He also ranked second in the National league with a career-high 68 stolen bases, but he was also caught stealing a career-high 26 times. The Cardinals' manager, Whitey Herzog, had ordered his fastest players to attempt to steal bases whenever possible as part of his strategy for winning.

All of the above pushed Smith all the way up to second place in voting for the regular-season National League Most Valuable Player for 1982. That season, outfielder Dale Murphy of the Atlanta Braves won the National League MVP award, tying for the lead in runs batted in and walloping 36 home runs.

Smith batted a healthy .321 during the 1982 World Series, and he helped the Cardinals to defeat the Milwaukee Brewers, four games to three.

Towards the end of his first season with the Cardinals, Smith infamously attacked the Phillie Phanatic. Despite his speed, Smith was known for occasionally tripping and falling while running. He attributed this to being "pigeon-toed" as a child. During a series between the Cardinals and the Phillies in September 1982, the Phillie Phanatic began mimicking Smith at close range before the game, doing belly-whops on the turf. Tired of the mocking, Smith tackled the Phanatic, reportedly injuring the mascot's ankles. Despite this, Smith was still allowed to play, so when he took his position in left field, Phillies fans started throwing beer bottles at him. Rather than seeking shelter, Smith turned around, threw up his arms, and taunted them, daring them to hit him, which none did.

Smith continued to play well during 1983, batting .321 (which placed him second in the National League only to Bill Madlock's .323), but in just 130 games, to again draw some MVP votes. However, this baseball season was struck with his first bout with illicit drug abuse, which sidelined him for a month at mid-season during a highly publicized rehabilitation stint at the Hyland Center in St. Louis.

Smith returned to the Cardinals after his time on the bench in 1983, and he remained with them through the end of the 1984 baseball season.

=== Kansas City Royals (1985–1987) ===
Smith was traded to the Royals in exchange for outfielder John Morris on May 17, 1985. The Royals were able to fill their left field spot with Smith; they had lacked an everyday player since the departure of Amos Otis two years earlier. Smith's past met his present following the regular season, when he hit .333 in the 1985 World Series to lead the Royals to a seven-game upset of the favored Cardinals. When Smith took the field in Game 1 of the 1985 World Series, he became the first player in MLB history to play in the World Series against a team that traded him away within the same season.

==== Pittsburgh drug trials ====
Smith testified in the Pittsburgh drug trials of September 1985. As with other major league players, he was granted immunity from prosecution in exchange for his testimony. In February 1986, Smith, along with six other players, was determined to have been a prolonged drug user who had also facilitated distribution to other players, and was suspended for a full season. All the suspended players were allowed to continue playing under the condition that they donated ten percent of their base salaries to drug-related community service, submitted to random drug testing, and contributed 100 hours of drug-related community service.

Smith went on to have his best season in three years in 1986, but saw his playing time reduced during the 1987 season.

In July 1987, Smith told the Kansas City Times that under his agreement with the commissioner of baseball, he was supposed to be tested six to eight times per-year but had not been tested so far during 1987. More so, he strongly disagreed with Commissioner Ueberroth that professional baseball was free from illicit drugs.

Following the 1987 season, Smith had trouble finding a new team to play with, and he came to think that then-Royals general manager John Schuerholz had blackballed him. By his own account, Smith was depressed and also addicted to cocaine when he considered murdering Schuerholz, and even purchased a pistol for that purpose. Smith had second thoughts about committing such a serious crime, however, and he dropped the idea entirely.

=== Atlanta Braves (1988–1992) ===
During March of 1988, then-Atlanta Braves general manager Bobby Cox (who would be succeeded by Schuerholz during Smith's time in Atlanta) offered Smith a contract to play there. During Spring training, he made it to the team's 25-man roster, but he batted just .237 in limited playing time that season. However, in 1989, he cracked the starting line-up for the Braves' outfield, and he went on to accomplish one of his best baseball seasons ever. During that season, Smith had a batting average of .315, and also had a career-high total of 21 home runs. Smith also led the National League with a .415 on-base percentage. Smith finished 11th in the voting of N.L. Most Valuable Player, and he was awarded the MLB Comeback Player of the Year Award.

Smith continued to be a regular outfielder for the Braves during the next two seasons, batting .305 in 1990 and .275 in 1991. Smith's play in 1991 helped the Braves improve from their National League West last-place finish in 1990 to winning the National League pennant in 1991, resulting in a World Series appearance for the first time since 1958, when the Braves were based in Milwaukee.

==== 1991 World Series ====
Smith's time in Atlanta might very well be remembered for when he committed a base-running blunder very late in Game 7 of the 1991 World Series versus the Minnesota Twins. Smith was on first base with no outs in the eighth inning of this scoreless game when Terry Pendleton struck a line-drive double to left field. It appeared that Smith should have been able to score on this hit, but as he was rounding second base he paused, then having to stop at third base. Smith later stated that he had lost sight of the baseball in the ceiling of the Metrodome, though replays from the TV coverage of the game showed that the Twins' second baseman Chuck Knoblauch and shortstop Greg Gagne had potentially deceived Smith; Knoblauch pretended to throw to Gagne for a force, but didn't actually have the ball. In the years since, Smith has declined ever being decoyed by the Twins infield.

Regardless of the cause, Smith only advanced to third base. After a ground-out (the runners could not advance) and an intentional walk (which loaded the bases), Smith was forced out at home plate in a double play, leaving the Braves scoreless. The game remained scoreless through the end of the ninth inning.

The Twins went on to score one run in the bottom of the tenth inning, taking the game 1–0, and winning the World Series four games to three. Smith hit three home runs in the Series.

Smith remained with the Braves through the end of the 1992 season, and he helped the Braves win the National League pennant once again, though they lost the World Series four games to two against the Toronto Blue Jays. Smith hit a grand slam in game five of that series.

=== Pittsburgh Pirates (1993) ===
Next, Smith departed from the Braves, and he signed up with the Pittsburgh Pirates, where he played one season.

=== Baltimore Orioles (1993–1994) ===
Smith was acquired by the Baltimore Orioles from the Pirates on September 8, 1993, in a transaction that was completed six days later on September 14 when a pair of minor leaguers, outfielder Stanton Cameron and left-handed pitcher Terry Farrar, were sent to Pittsburgh. Primarily used as a pinch-hitter, Smith played in his final major league game on August 10, 1994, in the Orioles' last game before that year's strike. He was granted free agency for the last time the following October 24.

=== Career statistics ===
In 1613 games over 17 seasons, Smith compiled a .288 batting average (1488-for-5170) with 909 runs, 273 doubles, 58 triples, 98 home runs, 533 RBI, 370 stolen bases, 623 base on balls, a .371 on-base percentage and a .420 slugging percentage. His career fielding percentage was .964. In five World Series and six playoff series, Smith hit .278 (57-for-205) with 28 runs scored, 4 home runs and 17 RBI.

Baseball historian Bill James wrote about Lonnie Smith's difficulties playing defense. He wryly stated that Smith should have had a post-retirement career teaching (so-called) "defensive recovery and cost containment" since he had excelled at recovering from defensive difficulties in the outfield.

== Retirement ==
After retiring from pro baseball, Smith married once more, and he and his wife returned to Atlanta to reside. They became the parents of three children. Smith briefly re-entered national attention in 2006, when he told The State, a newspaper from Columbia, South Carolina, about his notion to murder Schuerholz 18 years earlier.

== Records and achievements ==
- Smith is the first player to be a member of three different World Series winning teams (the Phillies, Cardinals, and Royals) within a single decade, and he did this in a six-year period. This feat was then matched by Will Smith who achieved it in consecutive years with the Braves, Astros, and Rangers.
- Smith set a franchise record for the St. Louis Cardinals on September 4, 1982, when he stole five bases in a single game.
- Smith won the National League's runs-scored championship in 1982, when he scored 120 runs for the St. Louis Cardinals. In that baseball season, he led the Cardinals to the National League pennant and also a World Series championship. This was also his only baseball season in which he was selected to play on the National League All-Star Team.

== See also ==
- List of Major League Baseball annual runs scored leaders
- List of Major League Baseball career stolen bases leaders
- List of sportspeople sanctioned for doping offences
- Major League Baseball Scandals
