= Larry Christenson =

American baseball player (1953–2026)

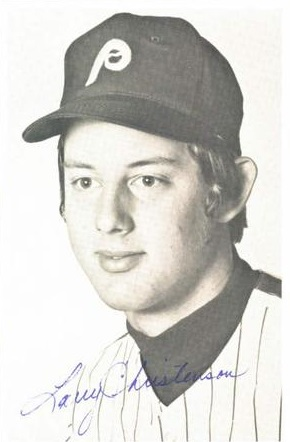
- Christenson in 1973
- Pitcher
- Born: November 10, 1953; Everett, Washington, U.S.
- Died: August 28, 2026 (aged 72); British Columbia, Canada
- Batted: Right Threw: Right

MLB debut
- April 13, 1973, for the Philadelphia Phillies

Last MLB appearance
- June 3, 1983, for the Philadelphia Phillies

MLB statistics
- Win–loss record: 83–71
- Earned run average: 3.79
- Strikeouts: 781
- Stats at Baseball Reference

Teams
- Philadelphia Phillies (1973–1983)

Career highlights and awards
- World Series champion (1980)

Larry Richard Christenson (November 10, 1953 – August 28, 2026), was an American professional baseball pitcher who played his entire Major League Baseball (MLB) career for the Philadelphia Phillies, with whom he won the 1980 World Series.

== Early life ==
Christenson attended Marysville High School in Marysville, Washington, where he participated in basketball, baseball, cross country, and football. He was initially scouted to play college basketball by schools in the Pac-8 Conference, but later attracted the attention of baseball scouts. Christenson also worked part-time at a lumberyard in high school. He struck out 143 batters in 72 innings and had an earned run average (ERA) of 0.28 in his senior year.

== Career ==
Christenson was selected third overall in the first round by the Phillies in the 1972 MLB draft, just one day after his graduation.

A short time later, he began his professional career with the Phillies’ Minor League Baseball (MiLB) Pulaski Phillies of the Appalachian League. His first MiLB and MLB hits were both home runs, and he is tied with Rick Wise for the most home runs (11) by a pitcher in Phillies history.

Christenson made his MLB debut on April 13, 1973, pitching a complete game and beating the New York Mets, 7–1. At the time, he was the youngest player in MLB at age 19, and remained so until 18-year-old David Clyde debuted for the Texas Rangers on June 27.

Christenson bounced back and forth from the majors to the minors until 1975, when the Phillies called him up to stay. He went 11–6 that season and became an important part of the Phillies teams that won three straight NL Eastern Division titles (1976–1978). His best seasons were during those three years: 1976, 13–8, 3.68 ERA; 1977, 19–6, 4.06 ERA, winning 15 of his last 16 decisions; and 1978, 13–14, 3.24 ERA. Christenson was the Phillies’ Game 1 starter in the 1978 National League Championship Series.

Thereafter, injuries plagued Christenson's career. He began the 1979 season on the disabled list (DL), with elbow problems, missing the first month. Later, that June, Christenson broke his collarbone during a charity bicycle ride and missed several weeks. He ended up with a 5–10 record that season. He was nearly dealt along with Tug McGraw and Bake McBride to the Texas Rangers for Sparky Lyle and Johnny Grubb at the 1979 Winter Meetings in Toronto, but the proposed transaction was never executed because a deferred money issue in Lyle's contract went unresolved.

In 1980, Christenson started off 3–0, but went on the DL, again, and had elbow surgery. He recovered to finish the season 5–1 and start Game 4 of the 1980 World Series, but was knocked out of the game in the first inning. In 1981, Christenson posted a 4–7 record, but earned a win in the 1981 National League Division Series against the Montreal Expos. His last injury-free season was 1982, when he made 32 starts and went 9–10. After a 2-4 start in 1983, Christenson underwent elbow surgery for the final time. He failed to make the postseason roster and the Phillies gave him his unconditional release on November 10 of that year, his 30th birthday. He tried physical rehabilitation for several years after, but was unable to return to baseball.

Although only a .150 hitter (64-for-427) in his 11-year major league career, Christenson hit 11 home runs with 46 RBI and 24 walks.

== Personal life and death ==
Christenson began a career in institutional investing in 1985, and was president of Christenson Investment Partners, which works with institutional asset managers and investors. Christenson resided in the Philadelphia area and also had properties in Leavenworth, Washington, and Winthrop, Washington. He has two adult daughters, Libby and Claire Christenson. Christenson maintained his ties with the Phillies and is well-known locally for his work on behalf of numerous charities.

He was an outdoors enthusiast. Christenson died on August 28, 2026, at the age of 72, while on a fishing trip in Washington.

== See also ==
- List of Major League Baseball players who spent their entire career with one franchise

== Sources ==
- Kashatus, William C. Lefty & Tim: How Steve Carlton and Tim McCarver Became Baseball's Best Battery. Lincoln: University of Nebraska Press, 2022.
