= Orlando Isales =

Puerto Rican baseball player (born 1959)

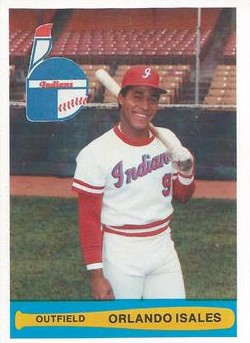
- Outfielder
- Born: December 22, 1959 (age 66); Santurce, Puerto Rico
- Batted: Right Threw: Right

MLB debut
- September 11, 1980, for the Philadelphia Phillies

Last MLB appearance
- October 5, 1980, for the Philadelphia Phillies

MLB statistics
- Batting average: .400
- Home runs: 0
- Runs batted in: 3
- Stats at Baseball Reference

Teams
- Philadelphia Phillies (1980)

Orlando Isales Pizarro (born December 22, 1959) is a Puerto Rican former Major League Baseball (MLB) outfielder. Signed as a non-drafted free agent in February 1975, he played in three games for the Philadelphia Phillies in 1980, getting two hits in five at bats, including one triple, and driving in three runs.

Isales made his MLB debut on September 11, 1980, when he was inserted into the game as a pinch runner for Pete Rose in the top of the ninth inning; he was replaced in the bottom of the inning by Phillies' closer Tug McGraw in the Phillies 5–1 victory over the New York Mets at Shea Stadium. His first at bat came on September 30, when he hit a 2-RBI triple as the Phillies defeated the Chicago Cubs at Veterans Stadium. In Isales' final game, manager Dallas Green named him as a starter in right field; he played the entire game which the Phillies lost in the bottom of the tenth inning, 7–8, to the Montreal Expos at Olympic Stadium.
