= Dutch Rennert =

American baseball umpire (1930–2018)

- Rennert making his distinctive strike call
- Born: June 12, 1930; Oshkosh, Wisconsin, U.S.
- Died: June 17, 2018 (aged 88); St. Augustine, Florida, U.S.
- Occupation: MLB umpire
- Years active: 1973–1992
- Height: 5 ft 8 in (1.73 m)

Laurence Henry "Dutch" Rennert Jr. (June 12, 1930 – June 17, 2018) was an American umpire in Major League Baseball who worked in the National League from 1973 to 1992.

== Early years ==
Rennert was born in Oshkosh, Wisconsin and graduated from Oshkosh High School. He played semi-pro football with the Oshkosh Comets and semi-pro baseball in Oshkosh. Rennert moved to Las Vegas, Nevada, worked for the post office, and officiated at basketball games. In 1958, Rennert graduated from the Al Somers Umpire School in Daytona Beach, Florida.

== Umpiring career ==
Considered one of the game's most colorful characters, best known for his animated and loud strike calls; similar to the NFL's colorful referee Red Cashion. A 1983 poll by The New York Times resulted in his selection as the NL's best umpire. He wore uniform number 16 throughout his career.

Reaching the major leagues after umpiring in the Pacific Coast League from 1965 to 1973, Rennert umpired in six National League Championship Series (1977, 1981, 1982, 1986, 1988, 1990), two All-Star Games (1979, 1984), and three World Series (1980, 1983, 1989); he was behind the plate when the Oakland Athletics won the 1989 World Series.

On called strikes to right-handed hitters, Rennert's style was to turn and face in the direction of the first-base dugout, raise his right hand and call "Strike!", take an exaggerated step forward with his left foot (keeping his right planted), and drop to his right knee as he pointed in that direction and called "one!" (or however many strikes there were, even on a called third strike). For left-handed hitters, he wouldn't step forward; he would squat to his right knee as he made the call.

After retiring, Rennert headed a group of instructors who held baseball clinics in Paris and Munich in January 1993. Thereafter, he participated regularly in the Los Angeles Dodgers' Adult Baseball Camp.

In an April 20, 2012, interview on Comcast Sportsnet Philadelphia, former National League President Bill White told local TV personality Larry Kane that an eye exam revealed that Rennert could not see out of his left eye and it couldn't be adjusted with glasses, and "I retired him nicely." White went on to say that he later saw Rennert in Vero Beach, Florida, and White said Rennert told him he had done the right thing.

On September 26, 2015, umpire Tom Hallion paid tribute to Rennert (who was in attendance) by calling the first strike in the game between the Miami Marlins and the Atlanta Braves using Rennert's classic strike mechanic.

=== Notable games ===
Rennert was the home plate umpire on August 3, 1989, when the Cincinnati Reds set a major league record with 16 hits in the first inning of an 18–2 home victory over the Houston Astros. Rennert was the first base umpire who ejected Cincinnati manager Lou Piniella on August 21, 1990, causing Piniella to pull the first base bag from its mooring and fling it into right field twice.

== Death ==
Rennert died on June 17, 2018, at the age of 88 in St. Augustine, Florida.

== See also ==
- List of Major League Baseball umpires (disambiguation)
