= Lanny Harris =

American baseball umpire (1940–1991)

- Born: Lanny Dean Harris; February 21, 1940; Greens Fork, Indiana, U.S.
- Died: June 26, 1991 (aged 51); Indianapolis, Indiana, U.S.
- Occupation: Umpire
- Years active: 1979–1985
- Employer: National League

Lanny Dean Harris (February 21, 1940 – June 16, 1991) was an American Major League Baseball umpire who worked in the National League from 1979 to 1985, wearing uniform number 29 during his career. Harris umpired 851 Major League games.

== MLB career ==
Harris was promoted to the National League during the umpire strike of 1979, one of eight umpires promoted to the major leagues at that time. He was discharged by the NL in 1985.

While in the majors, Harris felt the repercussions of having entered the league during the strike. After being hit in the throat by a foul ball during a 1979 game, Harris was examined by a trainer while his three veteran partners did not move from their positions in the field.

=== Notable games ===
Harris was thrown to the ground in a brawl involving Mario Soto and Claudell Washington in a 1984 Reds-Braves game.

=== Death ===
Harris, a resident of Palm Harbor, Florida, died at Indiana University Health Methodist Hospital in Indianapolis, Indiana on June 16, 1991 after an extended illness. His body was cremated.
