= Fred Brocklander =

American baseball umpire (1940-2009)

Brocklander

Frederick Brocklander (March 5, 1940 – August 13, 2009) was a Major League Baseball (MLB) umpire in the National League (NL) from 1979 to 1992. A native of Baltimore, Maryland, he umpired in the minor leagues for ten years. He was promoted to the National League during the 1979 umpire strike. He retired as an NL umpire in 1992. Throughout his National League career, he wore number 28.

== Early life and education ==
Brocklander was born in 1940 in the Highlandtown section of Baltimore, Maryland. As a student at Calvert Hall College High School, he played baseball and soccer. After graduating in 1958, Brocklander attended the University of Baltimore. In 1962, Brocklander joined the Kansas City Athletics organization as a minor league baseball player.

== Career as an umpire ==
After Brocklander finished playing baseball, he officiated amateur soccer and basketball, including Division I college basketball. He then turned to umpiring in minor league baseball for the next ten years, working in the Carolina, Eastern, Midwest, and Pacific Coast Leagues.

When major league umpires went on strike in 1979, Brocklander became an NL umpire. Baseball writer John Steadman later recalled, "Some of the veteran umpires, when the walkout was settled, ostracized him. Members of the same crew wouldn't acknowledge he was in the dressing room or on the field."

During his career, Brocklander was selected as an umpire for the 1984 Major League Baseball All-Star Game. On September 11, 1985, he was umpiring at second base when Pete Rose broke Ty Cobb’s all-time hits record with his 4,192nd hit, a single to left-center field off San Diego Padres pitcher Eric Show. While umpiring Game 5 of the 1986 National League Championship Series between the Astros and Mets, Brocklander made a controversial call on a play at first base with runners on first and third and one out; the out call on Craig Reynolds to turn an inning-ending double play cost the Astros a run in a game they eventually lost 2 to 1 in 12 innings. ABC broadcasters Keith Jackson and Tim McCarver, upon seeing the replay, each stated Reynolds was safe and with Jackson further adding, "That's a pretty good size miss."

Brocklander retired from major league umpiring due to ill health in 1992. He underwent surgery for removal of a kidney the following year. In 2006, reflecting on his career as a major league umpire, Brocklander said umpiring is "one of the few professions in the world where you’re supposed to be perfect and get better".

== Later years and death ==
Brocklander moved from New York City to Odenton, Maryland, in 1998. He umpired high school softball games and coached soccer at Baltimore's Mount Hebron High School. In 2000, he coached girls' soccer at South River High School when they played for the Anne Arundel County (Md.) championship.

Brocklander died in Severn, Maryland, on August 13, 2009, at age 69 following a stroke. He was survived by his wife and three daughters. He was eulogized on a Major League Baseball on Fox telecast. While broadcasting an Orioles-Texas Rangers Game of the Week from Baltimore on September 5, Josh Lewin and Mark Grace called him a "highly regarded major league umpire of twelve years". Lewin and Grace recalled that when Brocklander was home plate umpire, he would not merely call a pitch outside the strike zone a ball, but also made it a point to announce the pitch's location, such as "ball outside".
