= Kevin Saucier =

American baseball player (born 1956)

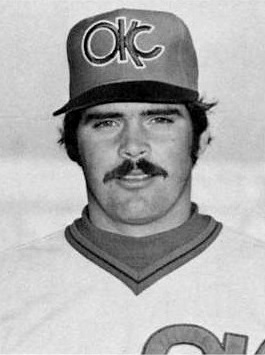
- Pitcher
- Born: August 9, 1956 (age 70); Pensacola, Florida, U.S.
- Batted: Right Threw: Left

MLB debut
- October 1, 1978, for the Philadelphia Phillies

Last MLB appearance
- July 25, 1982, for the Detroit Tigers

MLB statistics
- Win–loss record: 15–11
- Earned run average: 3.31
- Strikeouts: 94
- Saves: 19
- Stats at Baseball Reference

Teams
- Philadelphia Phillies (1978–1980); Detroit Tigers (1981–1982)

Career highlights and awards
- World Series champion (1980)

Kevin Andrew Saucier (born August 9, 1956) is an American former Major League Baseball pitcher from 1978 to 1982 for the Philadelphia Phillies and Detroit Tigers. Nicknamed "Hot Sauce", Saucier (whose name is pronounced "So-Shay"), was an energetic pitcher who would often display his emotions while on the mound. Saucier retired prior to the 1983 season due to his loss of control on the mound leading him to fear that he might kill someone with a pitch.

== Playing career ==
Saucier was selected in the 2nd round (27th overall) in the 1974 June Amateur Baseball Draft by the Philadelphia Phillies out of Escambia High School in Pensacola, Florida. He was primarily a middle reliever with the Phillies in 1979 and 1980, winning a World Series ring in 1980.

Saucier was traded twice within the fifty days following that Fall Classic. He was first sent to the Texas Rangers on November 19 to complete a transaction from two months earlier on September 13 when the Phillies acquired Sparky Lyle. He was then dealt from the Rangers to the Tigers for Mark Wagner three weeks later on December 10, 1980. The Tigers named him their closer for 1981 season. During the strike-shortened '81 season, he saved 13 games in 15 opportunities and posted an excellent 1.65 ERA. After saving five games to start the 1982 season, he started to complain of a tired arm and was eventually placed on the disabled list with a shoulder injury. His attempt to come back from the injury with the AAA Evansville Triplets was unsuccessful, as he walked 23 batters in 22 innings and pitched to a 7.36 ERA. Concerned that he "didn't know where the ball was going to go", he chose to retire from baseball.

== Post-playing career ==
Since the 1980s, Saucier has been a scout for the Major League Scouting Bureau, evaluating amateur baseball prospects in Alabama, the Florida panhandle and a portion of Georgia. In this position he has scouted future MLB players such as Chipper Jones, Alex Rodriguez, and Bo Jackson.
