= John Fulgham =

American baseball player (born 1956)

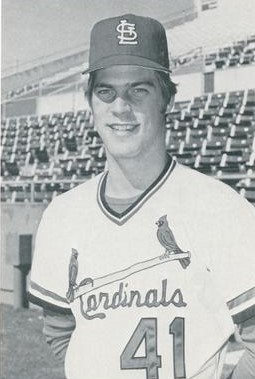
- Pitcher
- Born: June 9, 1956 (age 70); St. Louis, Missouri, U.S.
- Batted: Right Threw: Right

MLB debut
- June 19, 1979, for the St. Louis Cardinals

Last MLB appearance
- August 27, 1980, for the St. Louis Cardinals

MLB statistics
- Win–loss record: 14–12
- Earned run average: 2.84
- Strikeouts: 123
- Stats at Baseball Reference

Teams
- St. Louis Cardinals (1979–1980)

John Thomas Fulgham (born June 9, 1956) is an American former right-handed Major League Baseball pitcher who played from 1979 to 1980 for the St. Louis Cardinals. One of the team's promising pitching prospects in the late-1970s, his big league career was cut short because of a rotator cuff tear. His wife is the great-granddaughter of Effie Norton.

== Before professional baseball ==
Prior to professional baseball he attended Pattonville High School and then Yavapai Junior College and University of Miami.

== Draft and early minor leagues ==
Originally drafted by the New York Yankees 15th overall in the 1976 amateur draft, Fulgham did not sign. Drafted again 15th overall in the secondary phase of the 1976 amateur draft by the Cardinals, he signed and began his professional career with the GCL Cardinals. With the GCL Cardinals, Fulgham went 3–3 with a 3.38 ERA in 56 innings (12 games). For the St. Petersburg Cardinals in 1977, he went 18–6 with a 2.05 ERA in 26 games (202 innings). He pitched for the Arkansas Travelers in 1978, going 9–7 with a 4.03 ERA in 154 innings.

== The big leagues ==
He began the 1979 season with Springfield, going 6–3 with a 3.16 ERA in 77 innings. He made his big league debut on June 19 of that year, and he was arguably the Cardinals best pitcher over the rest of the season. In his debut, he pitched a complete-game shutout, allowing eight hits, one walk, striking out six, and getting the win. For the season, he went 10–6 with a 2.53 ERA, with all 10 of his wins being complete games. His ten wins tied him with David Palmer for second most wins by a rookie that season, trailing only Rick Sutcliffe's 17. Despite pitching well, he did not receive a single vote for Rookie of the Year.

Because of a torn rotator cuff, Fulgham appeared in only 15 games in 1980, going 4–6 with a 3.38 ERA. All four of his wins were complete games. He would never appear in the majors after 1980, playing his final game on August 27.

== Major league totals ==
In total, Fulgham went 14–12 with a 2.84 ERA in 35 big league games (33 starts). All 14 of his wins were complete games. In 231 1/3 innings, he allowed 189 hits, 17 home runs, 58 walks, and he struck out 158 batters.

== Back in the minor leagues ==
Despite not pitching in the majors again after 1980, Fulgham bounced around in the minors until 1983. Fulgham did not pitch in 1981, and he spent 1982 with St. Petersburg and the Louisville Redbirds. He went 4–2 with a 2.45 ERA for St. Petersburg, and with the Redbirds he went 4–3 with a 7.01 ERA. Overall, he went 8–5 with a 4.81 ERA. In 1983, he made five appearances for the Redbirds, going 1–2 with a 6.27 ERA.

== Post-playing days ==
Following his retirement, Fulgham was the head coach for Rollins College from 1992 to 1994, going 63–52 with one playoff game.
