= Ramón Avilés =

Puerto Rican baseball player (1952–2020)

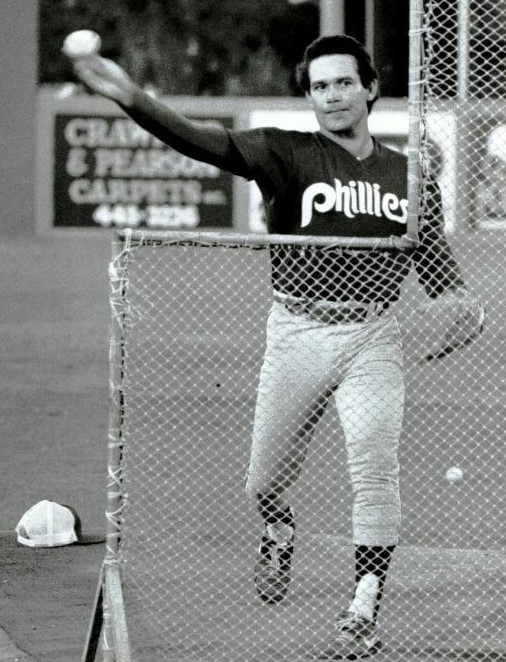
- Avilés in 1985
- Second baseman
- Born: January 22, 1949; Manatí, Puerto Rico
- Died: January 27, 2020 (aged 71); Manatí, Puerto Rico
- Batted: Right Threw: Right

MLB debut
- July 10, 1977, for the Boston Red Sox

Last MLB appearance
- October 4, 1981, for the Philadelphia Phillies

MLB statistics
- Batting average: .268
- Home runs: 2
- Runs batted in: 24
- Stats at Baseball Reference

Teams
- Boston Red Sox (1977); Philadelphia Phillies (1979–1981)

Career highlights and awards
- World Series champion (1980)

Ramón Antonio Avilés Miranda (January 22, 1949 – January 27, 2020) was a Puerto Rican backup infielder in Major League Baseball who played for the Boston Red Sox (1977) and Philadelphia Phillies (1979–1981). He batted and threw right-handed.

In a four-season career, totalling 117 games played, Avilés posted a .268 batting average (51-for-190) with two home runs and 24 runs batted in.

Avilés is the uncle of Mike Avilés, a former major league infielder.

He managed Los Criollos de Caguas and Los Gigantes de Carolina after moving back to Puerto Rico.

Avilés died on January 27, 2020, from complications of diabetes and high blood pressure at his home in Manatí, Puerto Rico.

== See also ==
- List of Major League Baseball players from Puerto Rico
