= Chuck Lindstrom =

American baseball player (1936–2021)

- Catcher
- Born: September 7, 1936; Chicago, Illinois, U.S.
- Died: September 29, 2021 (aged 85); Lincoln, Illinois, U.S.
- Batted: Right Threw: Right

MLB debut
- September 28, 1958, for the Chicago White Sox

Last MLB appearance
- September 28, 1958, for the Chicago White Sox

MLB statistics
- Batting average: 1.000
- Home runs: 0
- Runs batted in: 1
- Stats at Baseball Reference

Teams
- Chicago White Sox (1958)

Charles William Lindstrom (September 7, 1936 – September 29, 2021) was an American professional baseball catcher who played in one Major League Baseball game, for the 1958 Chicago White Sox. He was the son of National Baseball Hall of Fame inductee Freddie Lindstrom. Listed at 5 feet 11 inches (1.80 m) and 175 pounds (79 kg), he batted and threw right-handed.

== Biography ==
Lindstrom was born in Chicago in 1936, and graduated from New Trier High School. He was recognized as the American Legion Baseball player of the year for 1953. He then attended Northwestern University where he played college baseball for the Wildcats and graduated in 1958.

Lindstrom was signed by the Chicago White Sox as an amateur free agent on June 17, 1957. His career in Minor League Baseball spanned 1957 to 1961.

Lindstrom's major-league debut came during the fifth inning of a game September 28, 1958, versus the Kansas City Athletics as a defensive replacement for Johnny Romano. The first pitch from pitcher Hal Trosky was fumbled by Lindstrom as a passed ball, but he settled down and did not make another miscue. In his first plate appearance, in the bottom of the sixth inning, Lindstrom led off with a walk and later scored on a double by Don Mueller. Then, in the bottom of the seventh, he tripled, driving in Johnny Callison. Lindstrom was on deck when Sammy Esposito struck out looking to end the White Sox' last offensive inning in a game they won, 11–4. This was Lindstrom's only major-league game, as he was sent down to the minor leagues the following season and did not return to the major leagues.

Lindstrom is one of only four players to hit a triple in their one and only MLB at bat, the others being Eduardo Rodríguez (1973), Scott Munninghoff (1980), and Eric Cammack (2000). With a triple, a walk, a run, and a run batted in during two plate appearances, Lindstrom had one of the best one-game careers in major-league history, along with John Paciorek.

Lindstrom retired as a player shortly thereafter and went on to a successful 23-year coaching career with Lincoln College, highlighted by a 29–10 record in 1972, the first of five consecutive 20-win seasons. He later ran two sports-related companies and retired in 2010. Lindstrom died in Lincoln, Illinois, in September 2021 at the age of 85. He was survived by his wife and five children.

== See also ==
- List of second-generation Major League Baseball players
