= Joseph West =

Joseph or Joe West may refer to:

- Joe West (umpire) (born 1952), Major League Baseball umpire, actor, and country singer
- Joe West (gridiron football) (born 1984), American football and Canadian football wide receiver
- Joe West (footballer) (1910–1965), English football forward
- Joseph West (athlete) (born 1924), Irish Olympic runner
- Joseph G. West (1834–1917), American politician from Pennsylvania
- J. R. West (1822–1898), U.S. senator from Louisiana
- Joseph West (politician) (died 1691), governor of South Carolina
- Joe West (Arrowverse), a character in the Arrowverse franchise
