= Garry Maddox =

American baseball player (born 1949)

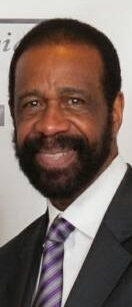
- Maddox in 2018
- Center fielder
- Born: September 1, 1949 (age 77); Cincinnati, Ohio, U.S.
- Batted: Right Threw: Right

MLB debut
- April 25, 1972, for the San Francisco Giants

Last MLB appearance
- April 20, 1986, for the Philadelphia Phillies

MLB statistics
- Batting average: .285
- Home runs: 117
- Runs batted in: 754
- Stats at Baseball Reference

Teams
- San Francisco Giants (1972–1975); Philadelphia Phillies (1975–1986)

Career highlights and awards
- World Series champion (1980); 8× Gold Glove Award (1975–1982); Roberto Clemente Award (1986); Philadelphia Phillies Wall of Fame
Military career
Allegiance	United States
Branch	United States Army
Service years	1968–1970

Garry Lee Maddox (born September 1, 1949) is an American former professional baseball player and business entrepreneur. He played in Major League Baseball (MLB) as a center fielder from 1972 to 1986. Maddox began his career with the San Francisco Giants but, rose to prominence with the Philadelphia Phillies where his impressive defensive play earned him eight consecutive Gold Glove Awards and, where he was a member of the 1980 World Series winning team.

In 1986, Maddox was named the recipient of the prestigious Roberto Clemente Award for his work on behalf of local charities. After his athletic career, he went on to become a successful businessman in Philadelphia and continued with his local charity work. Maddox was inducted into the Philadelphia Phillies Wall of Fame in 2001.

== Early life ==
Maddox was raised in Los Angeles, California. Instead of cheering for the Los Angeles Dodgers, he grew up rooting for the archrival San Francisco Giants. Willie Mays was his favorite player, and he wore number 24 when he played Little League Baseball. Maddox was a 1968 graduate of San Pedro High School.

== Military career ==
Maddox was drafted by the San Francisco Giants in the second round of the 1968 amateur draft and signed to a minor league contract. While playing with the Giants' minor league affiliates in Salt Lake City and Fresno, California, Maddox discovered that other Giants minor league rookies received higher bonuses and were paid more per month, so he requested that the team's front office staff place him on the same level. When team management refused, Maddox quit the team and joined the United States Army. After basic training, he volunteered for service in Vietnam during the Vietnam War. He served in the Army from 1968 to 1970, including a year in Vietnam, before receiving a hardship discharge so he could help support the Maddox family after his father became ill.

Exposure to chemicals in Vietnam left Maddox's skin highly sensitive, and he has worn a full beard ever since to protect his face.

== Professional career ==
=== San Francisco Giants ===
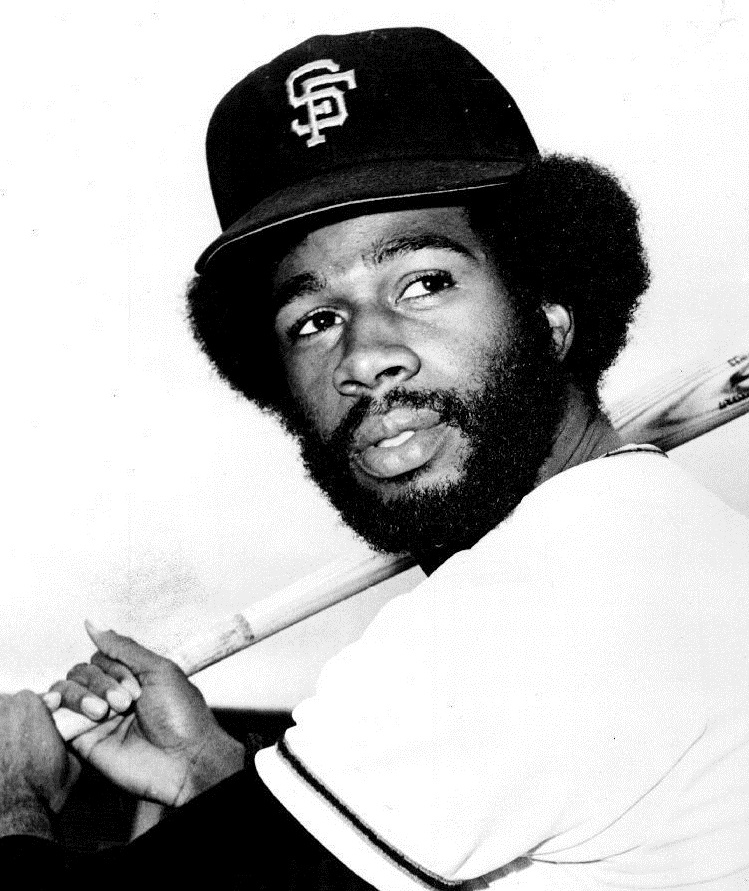
Maddox in 1974

Maddox resumed his baseball career after leaving the army. Starting 1972 with the Phoenix Giants of the Triple-A Pacific Coast League, he batted .438 with 14 extra-base hits and 22 RBI. On April 25, he was promoted to the big leagues by the Giants. In San Francisco, he replaced Mays as the Giants' centerfielder; Mays would be traded to the New York Mets on May 5. On May 4, 1975, the Giants traded him to the Philadelphia Phillies for first baseman Willie Montañez after the Phillies had failed in their efforts to acquire Rusty Staub from the Mets. The Phillies traded Montanez with the intention to replace him at first-base with Dick Allen. Maddox went on to win his first Gold Glove Award as the top center fielder in the National League. Montanez was traded away the next year.

=== Philadelphia Phillies ===
As if to prove that 1975 was no fluke, Maddox proceeded to earn a Gold Glove in each of his first eight seasons as a Phillie. Dubbed the "Secretary of Defense" in 1976 by Daily News columnist Bill Conlin, Maddox and his ballhawking prowess later provided inspiration for one of baseball's better known quotes: "Two-thirds of the Earth is covered by water, the other one-third by Garry Maddox." (Note: Notwithstanding what seems to be the overwhelming consensus regarding authorship of this quote, (with even baseball's HOF casually dubbing it a "Kinerism" and Kiner himself claiming it was simply "a good ad lib" on his part), the fact remains that the first documented instance of Ralph Kiner uttering those words, which occurred during the 1978 NLCS, was preceded in print not once but twice. The first instance—more than 3 months earlier—was by LA Times beat writer Dan Hafner; the second, by Ray Didinger in Baseball Digest. Neither makes any mention of Kiner.)

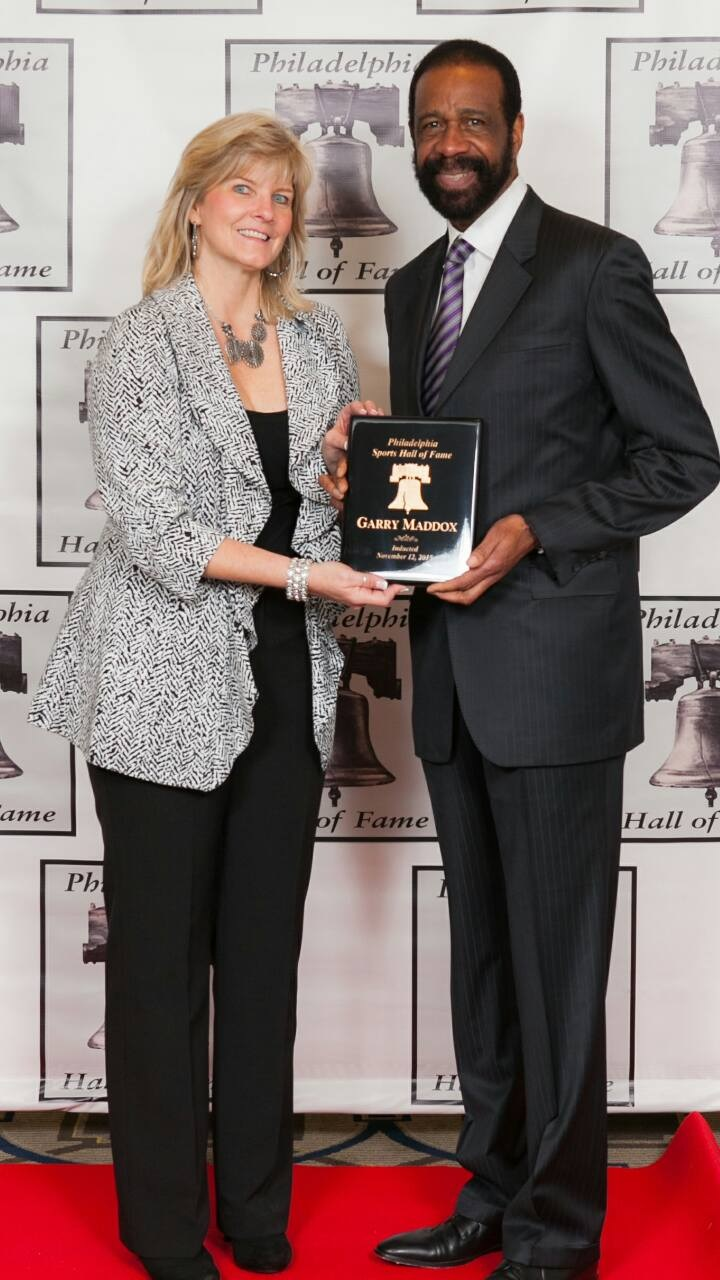
Maddox was inducted into the Philadelphia Sports Hall of Fame

In 1976, Maddox had his best year as a hitter, with a .330 batting average, and helped the Phillies win the National League East, their first postseason berth since the Whiz Kids in the 1950 World Series. But the team lost three consecutive National League Championship Series, including in 1978 against the Los Angeles Dodgers as Maddox made a crucial error in Game Four. With the score tied in the bottom of the tenth inning, two out, and Ron Cey on first, Maddox misplayed Dusty Baker's fly ball. He started back on the ball, then charged forward, and the ball glanced off his glove, allowing the Dodgers to stay alive after what would have been the third out. Bill Russell then followed with a single to center. With Cey running on the play, Maddox charged the ball but it skipped past him as Cey scored the winning run to put the Dodgers in the World Series. Because Maddox would have had to execute a near perfect field and throw to get Cey out at the plate, he was not charged with what would have been his second error of the inning.

In the 10th inning of the fifth and final game of the 1980 NLCS against the Houston Astros, his double scored Del Unser for the pennant-winning run. In the bottom half, he caught Enos Cabell's fly ball for the final out to put the Phillies in the World Series for the first time since 1950. The Phillies beat the Kansas City Royals for their first World Championship.

In 1983 the Phillies again made it to the World Series losing this time to the Baltimore Orioles. In Game 1 the score was tied one to one until Maddox led off the eighth inning with a solo home run. The final was two to one and the Phillies' only win of the series. Maddox later lined out to Orioles shortstop Cal Ripken Jr. for the final out of game 5 and the series.

Maddox continued to win Gold Gloves, steal bases and hit well for the Phillies until 1985, when he declined rapidly. He retired after six games into the next season. That year, he was honored with the Roberto Clemente Award, given annually to a player who demonstrates the values the Hall of Fame Pittsburgh Pirates outfielder displayed in his commitment to community and understanding the value of helping others.

During his career, Maddox played in six postseasons, winning five full-season Division titles, two pennants and one World Series, all with the Phillies. His lifetime batting average was .285. Never a slugger, his peak year brought him just 14 home runs, and he hit 117 for his career. But he did hit 337 doubles and 62 triples, products of the speed that also allowed him to run down fly balls few outfielders could reach, and to steal 20 or more bases in nine straight seasons. For his career, he had 248 stolen bases, which in October 2022 ranks 242nd on the all-time list.

== Post-playing career ==
After retiring, he founded World Wide Concessions, a leading national promotional products company specializing in unique branded gifts and packaging. By 1995, Maddox was majority owner and CEO of A. Pomerantz & Company, a Philadelphia-based office furniture company. In 2003, Maddox began a four-year term on the board of Federal Reserve Bank of Philadelphia.

Maddox has also worked as a spring training instructor for the Phillies, and was a color analyst for Phillies games on Philadelphia's now-defunct cable-sports network PRISM from 1987 to 1995. His son, Garry Maddox, Jr., also played professional baseball, but did not reach the major leagues.

Maddox is a BBQ chef, and for a number of years has hosted the Garry Maddox Barbecue Challenge, a yearly fundraiser held outside of Citizens Bank Park before a home Phillies game, where local restaurants and amateur chefs compete in various categories. All proceeds benefit Compete 360, an academic enrichment program founded by Maddox to foster DT Philly, a design thinking (DT) practice in Philadelphia public schools that trains teachers to facilitate DT projects with their students.

In 2005, Maddox and other individuals became prominent investors in a Foxwoods slots casino proposed for Philadelphia, Pennsylvania. In September 2008, facing massive opposition at the originally proposed waterfront location, backers for the slots casino decided to try to seek a new location in the Center City area, next to Philadelphia's Chinatown community. On December 16, 2010, the Gaming Control Board voted to revoke the casino's license after the venture failed to secure funding.

== See also ==
- List of Major League Baseball career stolen bases leaders
