= 1980 Los Angeles Dodgers season =

1980 Los Angeles Dodgers
- League: National League
- Division: West
- Ballpark: Dodger Stadium
- City: Los Angeles
- Record: 92–71 (.564)
- Divisional place: 2nd
- Owner: Peter O'Malley
- General managers: Al Campanis
- Managers: Tommy Lasorda
- Television: KTTV (11); Vin Scully, Jerry Doggett, Ross Porter; ONTV; Geoff Witcher, Al Downing
- Radio: KABC; Vin Scully, Jerry Doggett, Ross Porter; KTNQ; Jaime Jarrín, Rudy Hoyos

The 1980 Los Angeles Dodgers season was the 91st season for the Los Angeles Dodgers franchise in Major League Baseball (MLB), their 23rd season in Los Angeles, California, and their 19th season playing their home games at Dodger Stadium. The Dodgers finished the season in second place in the National League West, one game behind the Houston Astros. After the 162-game regular season, the Dodgers and Astros were tied in first place in the Western Division. The two teams faced off in a 1-game playoff on October 6, 1980 at Dodger Stadium, which the Astros won 7–1 behind a complete-game victory by pitcher Joe Niekro. Don Sutton set a Dodger record with his 52nd career shutout this season and the Dodgers also hosted the All-Star game for the first time.

With the Dodgers joining the pay television trend, several games began to be broadcast on regional subscription channel ON TV, which aired on KBSC-TV in the greater Los Angeles area. As a result, the TV broadcasting team was expanded. For games aired on ON TV, the broadcast team was composed of Geoff Witcher and former Dodger Al Downing. However, long-time Dodger broadcaster Vin Scully remained as the announcer for games aired on free-to-air television (KTTV).

== Offseason ==
- November 17, 1979: Don Stanhouse was signed as a free agent by the Dodgers.
- December 3, 1979: Von Joshua was selected off waivers from the Dodgers by the San Diego Padres.
- March 27, 1980: Johnny Oates was released by the Dodgers.

== Regular season ==
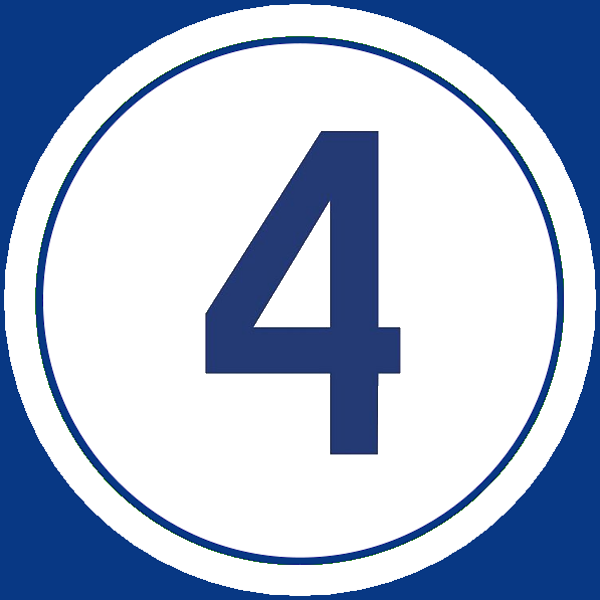
Duke Snider's number 4 was retired by the Los Angeles Dodgers in 1980.

=== Season standings ===
NL West
Team	W	L	Pct.	GB	Home	Road
Houston Astros	93	70	.571	—	55‍–‍26	38‍–‍44
Los Angeles Dodgers	92	71	.564	1	55‍–‍27	37‍–‍44
Cincinnati Reds	89	73	.549	3½	44‍–‍37	45‍–‍36
Atlanta Braves	81	80	.503	11	50‍–‍30	31‍–‍50
San Francisco Giants	75	86	.466	17	44‍–‍37	31‍–‍49
San Diego Padres	73	89	.451	19½	45‍–‍36	28‍–‍53

=== Record vs. opponents ===
1980 National League record Sources:
Team	ATL	CHC	CIN	HOU	LAD	MON	NYM	PHI	PIT	SD	SF	STL
Atlanta	—	8–4	2–16	7–11	11–7	5–7	3–9	5–7	11–1	12–6	11–6	6–6
Chicago	4–8	—	7–5	1–11	5–7	6–12	10–8	5–13	8–10	4–8	5–7	9–9
Cincinnati	16–2	5–7	—	8–10	9–9	3–9	8–4	7–5	6–6	15–3–1	7–11	5–7
Houston	11–7	11–1	10–8	—	9–10	5–7	8–4	3–9	7–5	11–7	11–7	7–5
Los Angeles	7–11	7–5	9–9	10–9	—	11–1	7–5	6–6	6–6	9–9	13–5	7–5
Montreal	7–5	12–6	9–3	7–5	1–11	—	10–8	9–9	6–12	10–2	7–5	12–6
New York	9–3	8–10	4–8	4–8	5–7	8–10	—	6–12	10–8	1–11	3–9	9–9
Philadelphia	7–5	13–5	5–7	9–3	6–6	9–9	12–6	—	7–11	8–4	6–6	9–9
Pittsburgh	1–11	10–8	6–6	5–7	6–6	12–6	8–10	11–7	—	6–6	8–4	10–8
San Diego	6–12	8–4	3–15–1	7–11	9–9	2–10	11–1	4–8	6–6	—	10–8	7–5
San Francisco	6–11	7–5	11–7	7–11	5–13	5–7	9–3	6–6	4–8	8–10	—	7–5
St. Louis	6–6	9–9	7–5	5–7	5–7	6–12	9–9	9–9	8–10	5–7	5–7	—

=== Opening Day lineup ===
Opening Day starters
Name	Position
Davey Lopes	Second baseman
Rudy Law	Center fielder
Reggie Smith	Right fielder
Steve Garvey	First baseman
Dusty Baker	Left fielder
Ron Cey	Third baseman
Derrel Thomas	Shortstop
Steve Yeager	Catcher
Burt Hooton	Starting pitcher

=== Notable transactions ===
- July 11, 1980: Charlie Hough was purchased from the Dodgers by the Texas Rangers.
- September 13, 1980: Dennis Lewallyn and cash were traded by the Dodgers to the Texas Rangers for Pepe Frías.

=== Roster ===
1980 Los Angeles Dodgers
Roster
Pitchers: 27 Joe Beckwith; 37 Bobby Castillo; 51 Terry Forster; 38 Dave Goltz; 46 Burt Hooton; 49 Charlie Hough; 57 Steve Howe; 41 Jerry Reuss; 29 Don Stanhouse; 43 Rick Sutcliffe; 20 Don Sutton; 34 Fernando Valenzuela; 35 Bob Welch	Catchers: 13 Joe Ferguson; 14 Mike Scioscia; 7 Steve Yeager; Infielders: 10 Ron Cey; 23 Vic Davalillo; 36 Pepe Frías; 6 Steve Garvey; 15 Davey Lopes; 45 Jack Perconte; 18 Bill Russell; 1 Gary Weiss	Outfielders: 12 Dusty Baker; 28 Pedro Guerrero; 44 Mickey Hatcher; 21 Jay Johnstone; 3 Rudy Law; 17 Bobby Mitchell; 16 Rick Monday; 11 Manny Mota; 8 Reggie Smith; 30 Derrel Thomas; 9 Gary Thomasson	Manager: 2 Tommy Lasorda; Coaches: 26 Red Adams; 54 Monty Basgall; 58 Mark Cresse; 11 Manny Mota; 33 Danny Ozark

== Game log ==
=== Regular season ===
Legend
	Dodgers win
	Dodgers loss
	Postponement
	Eliminated from playoff race
**Bold**	Dodgers team member

1980 regular season game log: 92–71 (Home: 55–27; Away: 37–44)
April (13–7)

#	Date	Opponent	Score	Win	Loss	Save	Attendance	Record
1	April 10	@ Astros	2–3	Richard (1–0)	**Hooton** (0–1)	Sambito (1)	33,270	0–1
2	April 11	@ Astros	6–10	Smith (1–0)	**Stanhouse** (0–1)		30,701	0–2
3	April 12	@ Astros	6–5 (17)	**Howe** (1–0)	Smith (1–1)	**Hooton** (1)	24,609	1–2
4	April 13	@ Astros	2–4	Forsch (1–0)	**Goltz** (0–1)	LaCorte (1)	33,676	1–3
5	April 14	@ Padres	1–2	Fingers (2–0)	**Castillo** (0–1)		28,650	1–4
6	April 15	@ Padres	5–9	Wise (1–0)	**Sutcliffe** (0–1)	Mura (1)	19,325	1–5
7	April 16	@ Padres	10–4	**Hooton** (1–1)	Curtis (1–1)		24,861	2–5
8	April 17	Astros	6–4	**Reuss** (1–0)	Smith (1–2)		45,476	3–5
9	April 18	Astros	4–7	Forsch (2–0)	**Goltz** (0–2)	Andújar (1)	41,112	3–6
10	April 19	Astros	0–2	Richard (2–0)	**Welch** (0–1)		50,112	3–7
11	April 20	Astros	4–2	**Reuss** (2–0)	Niekro (1–1)		39,442	4–7
12	April 21	Giants	4–3	**Hooton** (2–1)	Blue (2–1)	**Howe** (1)	29,779	5–7
13	April 22	Giants	6–0	**Sutton** (1–0)	Knepper (1–2)		21,691	6–7
14	April 23	Giants	4–0	**Goltz** (1–2)	Whitson (0–3)		24,822	7–7
15	April 24	Giants	5–2 (10)	**Reuss** (3–0)	Lavelle (0–3)		30,687	8–7
16	April 25	Padres	6–3	**Castillo** (1–1)	Kinney (0–1)	**Howe** (2)	39,720	9–7
17	April 26	Padres	4–3	**Beckwith** (1–0)	Fingers (2–2)		48,568	10–7
18	April 27	Padres	3–1	**Sutton** (2–0)	Curtis (1–2)	**Hough** (1)	42,756	11–7
19	April 29	@ Giants	5–0	**Goltz** (2–2)	Montefusco (1–3)		16,940	12–7
20	April 30	@ Giants	4–3	**Welch** (1–1)	Minton (1–1)	**Howe** (3)	19,006	13–7

May (15–11)

#	Date	Opponent	Score	Win	Loss	Save	Attendance	Record
21	May 2	@ Phillies	5–9	Reed (1–0)	**Hough** (0–1)		30,294	13–8
22	May 3	@ Phillies	3–7	Christenson (2–0)	**Hooton** (2–2)		35,011	13–9
23	May 4	@ Phillies	12–10	**Beckwith** (2–0)	Noles (0–1)	**Reuss** (1)	34,027	14–9
24	May 6	@ Pirates	1–2	Tekulve (3–0)	**Howe** (1–1)		9,817	14–10
25	May 7	@ Pirates	6–7	Tekulve (4–0)	**Hough** (0–2)		11,404	14–11
26	May 9	@ Cardinals	7–15	Borbón (1–0)	**Sutcliffe** (0–2)		23,394	14–12
27	May 10	@ Cardinals	5–3	**Hooton** (3–2)	Vuckovich (5–2)	**Reuss** (2)	27,450	15–12
28	May 11	@ Cardinals	4–2	**Goltz** (3–2)	Forsch (2–2)	**Reuss** (3)	17,696	16–12
29	May 12	Cubs	2–1	**Sutton** (3–0)	Reuschel (2–3)	**Castillo** (1)	36,401	17–12
30	May 13	Cubs	4–2	**Welch** (2–1)	Lamp (2–4)		32,331	18–12
31	May 14	Cubs	2–5	McGlothen (2–0)	**Hooton** (3–3)	Sutter (9)	29,001	18–13
32	May 16	Pirates	8–6	**Reuss** (4–0)	Tekulve (5–1)	**Sutcliffe** (1)	47,929	19–13
33	May 17	Pirates	3–1	**Sutton** (4–0)	Blyleven (0–4)	**Howe** (4)	50,082	20–13
34	May 18	Pirates	2–0	**Welch** (3–1)	Bibby (5–1)	**Howe** (5)	49,867	21–13
35	May 19	Cardinals	5–1	**Hooton** (4–3)	Thomas (1–1)		34,297	21–14
36	May 20	Cardinals	4–3	**Reuss** (5–0)	Vuckovich (5–4)	**Sutcliffe** (2)	29,710	22–14
37	May 21	Cardinals	5–3	**Beckwith** (3–0)	Littell (0–2)	**Castillo** (2)	31,174	23–14
38	May 23	@ Cubs	0–2	Lamp (3–4)	**Sutton** (4–1)		7,482	23–15
39	May 24	@ Cubs	4–2	**Welch** (4–1)	Krukow (3–5)	**Sutcliffe** (3)	22,543	24–15
40	May 25	@ Cubs	1–2	Sutter (3–3)	**Howe** (1–2)		27,226	24–16
41	May 26	@ Reds	4–0	**Reuss** (6–0)	Seaver (2–3)		–	25–16
42	May 26	@ Reds	4–5	Moskau (3–0)	**Goltz** (3–3)	Bair (4)	29,483	25–17
43	May 27	@ Reds	1–6	LaCoss (4–4)	**Sutton** (4–2)		20,296	26–17
44	May 29	Braves	3–0	**Welch** (5–1)	Niekro (3–7)		24,630	27–17
45	May 30	Braves	8–4	**Hooton** (5–3)	Matula (3–4)		32,200	28–17
46	May 31	Braves	5–6	Boggs (2–1)	**Reuss** (6–1)	Garber (2)	40,161	28–18

June (14–14)

#	Date	Opponent	Score	Win	Loss	Save	Attendance	Record
47	June 1	Braves	5–9	Alexander (2–2)	**Goltz** (3–4)	Camp (3)	49,320	28–19
48	June 2	Reds	3–2	**Sutcliffe** (1–2)	Bair (0–3)		31,368	29–19
49	June 3	Reds	5–1	**Welch** (6–1)	Seaver (2–4)	**Howe** (6)	44,962	30–19
50	June 4	Reds	4–5	Moskau (4–0)	**Hough** (0–3)	Hume (8)	45,541	30–20
51	June 6	@ Braves	5–0	**Reuss** (7–1)	Niekro (4–8)		18,331	31–20
52	June 7	@ Braves	1–6	Alexander (3–2)	**Goltz** (3–5)		25,723	31–21
53	June 8	@ Braves	3–1	**Sutton** (5–2)	Boggs (2–2)	**Sutcliffe** (4)	12,543	32–21
–	June 9	@ Mets	Postponed (rain); Makeup: June 12					
54	June 10	@ Mets	4–5	Hausman (2–1)	**Welch** (6–2)		14,759	32–22
55	June 11	@ Mets	2–6 (10)	Swan (5–4)	**Sutcliffe** (1–3)		23,540	32–23
56	June 12	@ Mets	5–6	Reardon (3–2)	**Castillo** (1–2)	Allen (10)	19,501	32–24
57	June 13	@ Expos	3–4	Rogers (8–5)	**Howe** (1–3)		34,655	32–25
58	June 14	@ Expos	8–0	**Hooton** (6–3)	Grimsley (2–4)		44,585	33–25
59	June 15	@ Expos	1–0	**Welch** (7–2)	Gullickson (0–1)		36,176	34–25
60	June 16	Phillies	2–3 (12)	Reed (4–1)	**Sutcliffe** (1–4)	McGraw (6)	41,340	34–26
61	June 17	Phillies	5–6	Reed (5–1)	**Castillo** (1–3)	McGraw (7)	40,786	34–27
62	June 18	Expos	8–7	**Hough** (1–3)	Sosa (4–3)	**Howe** (7)	41,229	35–27
63	June 19	Expos	5–3 (10)	**Castillo** (2–3)	Fryman (1–2)		35,819	36–27
64	June 20	Mets	4–3	**Howe** (2–3)	Zachry (1–4)		48,608	37–27
65	June 21	Mets	5–0	**Reuss** (8–1)	Swan (5–5)		41,605	38–27
66	June 22	Mets	6–9	Bomback (4–1)	**Goltz** (3–6)	Allen (11)	43,298	38–28
67	June 23	@ Astros	3–0	**Sutcliffe** (2–4)	Andújar (0–3)		29,753	39–28
68	June 24	@ Astros	4–5 (12)	LaCorte (4–0)	**Beckwith** (3–1)		34,388	39–29
69	June 25	@ Astros	9–2	**Welch** (8–2)	Forsch (8–6)		34,416	40–29
70	June 27	@ Giants	8–0	**Reuss** (9–1)	Blue (9–5)		20,285	41–29
71	June 28	@ Giants	3–4 (11)	Griffin (2–1)	**Sutcliffe** (2–5)		25,145	41–30
72	June 29	@ Giants	3–4	Knepper (6–9)	**Castillo** (2–4)		–	41–31
73	June 29	@ Giants	3–0	**Hooton** (7–3)	Ripley (2–3)		50,229	42–31
74	June 30	Padres	3–4	Eichelberger (2–0)	**Welch** (8–3)	Shirley (7)	29,756	42–32

July (13–14)

#	Date	Opponent	Score	Win	Loss	Save	Attendance	Record
75	July 1	Padres	1–4	Mura (2–3)	**Reuss** (9–2)	Fingers (10)	38,801	42–33
76	July 2	Padres	10–7	**Sutcliffe** (3–5)	Blair (0–1)		33,232	43–33
77	July 3	Padres	5–4 (10)	**Castillo** (3–4)	Shirley (5–5)		31,375	44–33
78	July 4	Giants	4–0	**Sutton** (6–2)	Ripley (2–4)		49,846	45–33
79	July 5	Giants	3–2	**Welch** (9–3)	Whitson (7–8)	**Castillo** (3)	41,587	46–33
80	July 6	Giants	4–7 (10)	Holland (2–1)	**Howe** (2–4)		46,244	46–34
–	July 8	51st All-Star Game	American League vs. National League (Dodger Stadium, Los Angeles, California)					
81	July 10	Astros	4–3	**Howe** (3–4)	Ryan (5–7)		49,692	47–34
82	July 11	Astros	3–2	**Reuss** (10–2)	Forsch (8–8)	**Howe** (8)	42,754	48–34
83	July 12	@ Padres	2–3 (12)	Rasmussen (2–8)	**Beckwith** (3–2)		39,605	48–35
84	July 13	@ Padres	3–4 (15)	Kinney (3–1)	**Beckwith** (3–3)		18,232	48–36
85	July 14	@ Padres	3–6	Mura (3–3)	**Sutcliffe** (3–6)		22,370	48–37
86	July 15	@ Cubs	6–2	**Hooton** (8–3)	McGlothen (6–7)	**Goltz** (1)	20,257	49–37
87	July 16	@ Cubs	1–4	Reuschel (6–9)	**Reuss** (10–3)		18,638	49–38
88	July 17	@ Cubs	3–1	**Sutton** (7–2)	Lamp (9–8)		21,389	50–38
89	July 18	@ Pirates	4–6	Rhoden (1–1)	**Welch** (9–4)	Romo (6)	30,131	50–39
90	July 19	@ Pirates	3–7	Solomon (5–3)	**Sutcliffe** (3–7)		28,731	50–40
91	July 20	@ Pirates	4–2	**Hooton** (9–3)	Candelaria (6–9)	**Howe** (9)	–	51–40
92	July 20	@ Pirates	7–8	Jackson (8–2)	**Castillo** (3–5)		41,932	51–41
93	July 21	@ Cardinals	2–5	Vuckovich (9–6)	**Goltz** (3–7)	Littlefield (5)	20,224	51–42
94	July 22	@ Cardinals	2–3	Urrea (3–0)	**Sutton** (7–3)	Littlefield (6)	25,174	51–43
95	July 23	@ Cardinals	3–7	Martínez (3–3)	**Welch** (9–5)		28,654	51–44
96	July 25	Cubs	7–6	**Howe** (4–4)	Sutter (3–5)		50,546	52–44
97	July 26	Cubs	3–5	McGlothen (8–7)	**Reuss** (10–4)	Sutter (21)	50,125	52–45
98	July 27	Cubs	3–2 (12)	**Howe** (5–4)	Caudill (1–3)		42,363	53–45
99	July 28	Pirates	4–6	Rhoden (2–1)	**Welch** (9–6)	Tekulve (15)	46,973	53–46
100	July 29	Pirates	10–2	**Hooton** (10–3)	Blyleven (5–8)		47,013	54–46
101	July 30	Pirates	3–0	**Reuss** (11–4)	Candelaria (7–10)		50,308	55–46

August (18–11)

#	Date	Opponent	Score	Win	Loss	Save	Attendance	Record
102	August 1	Cardinals	2–1 (10)	**Goltz** (4–7)	Forsch (7–7)		43,549	56–46
103	August 2	Cardinals	3–2	**Welch** (10–6)	Vuckovich (9–8)	**Stanhouse** (1)	49,520	57–46
104	August 3	Cardinals	1–4	Martínez (4–4)	**Hooton** (10–4)		31,833	57–47
105	August 4	@ Braves	5–3	**Reuss** (12–4)	Boggs (5–7)	**Stanhouse** (2)	30,330	58–47
106	August 5	@ Braves	4–6	Camp (4–4)	**Stanhouse** (0–2)		10,187	58–48
107	August 6	@ Braves	6–2	**Sutton** (8–3)	Matula (6–10)	**Castillo** (4)	9,441	59–48
108	August 7	@ Braves	3–4	Alexander (10–6)	**Welch** (10–7)	Camp (6)	10,056	59–49
109	August 8	@ Reds	5–8	Hume (6–7)	**Castillo** (3–6)		40,339	59–50
110	August 9	@ Reds	9–4	**Reuss** (13–4)	Seaver (4–6)	**Sutcliffe** (5)	45,095	60–50
111	August 10	@ Reds	7–1	**Goltz** (5–7)	Moskau (8–4)		35,179	61–50
112	August 11	Braves	2–3	Matula (7–10)	**Sutton** (8–4)	Camp (8)	32,118	61–51
113	August 12	Braves	6–7	Garber (3–5)	**Sutcliffe** (3–8)	Camp (9)	35,905	61–52
114	August 13	Braves	0–2	Boggs (6–8)	**Hooton** (10–5)		36,345	61–53
115	August 15	Reds	3–1	**Reuss** (14–4)	Seaver (4–7)		50,933	62–53
116	August 16	Reds	2–3	Hume (7–7)	**Howe** (5–5)		42,743	62–54
117	August 17	Reds	2–6	Soto (7–5)	**Welch** (10–8)	Hume (21)	47,177	62–55
118	August 19	@ Expos	3–2	**Stanhouse** (1–2)	Sosa (7–5)		45,320	63–55
119	August 20	@ Expos	5–1	**Reuss** (15–4)	Rogers (11–9)		32,630	64–55
120	August 21	@ Expos	5–4 (10)	**Howe** (6–5)	Bahnsen (7–5)		33,523	65–55
121	August 22	@ Mets	2–4	Burris (7–7)	**Welch** (10–9)	Allen (22)	21,936	65–56
122	August 23	@ Mets	4–2	**Goltz** (6–7)	Hausman (5–4)	**Howe** (10)	32,440	66–56
123	August 24	@ Mets	3–2	**Hooton** (11–5)	Zachry (6–7)	**Howe** (11)	24,956	67–56
124	August 25	@ Phillies	8–4	**Stanhouse** (2–2)	Noles (1–4)		34,267	68–56
125	August 26	@ Phillies	8–4	**Castillo** (4–6)	Walk (9–3)		35,358	69–56
126	August 27	@ Phillies	3–4	Carlton (20–7)	**Howe** (6–6)	McGraw (14)	39,116	69–57
127	August 29	Expos	5–4	**Castillo** (5–6)	D'Acquisto (2–4)	**Howe** (12)	50,810	70–57
128	August 30	Expos	4–3	**Hooton** (12–5)	Gullickson (6–4)	**Stanhouse** (3)	35,778	71–57
129	August 31	Expos	2–0	**Reuss** (16–4)	Rogers (12–10)		–	72–57
130	August 31	Expos	7–2	**Sutton** (9–4)	Palmer (6–4)		48,542	73–57

September (15–12)

#	Date	Opponent	Score	Win	Loss	Save	Attendance	Record
131	September 1	Mets	5–2	**Welch** (11–9)	Burris (7–9)	**Howe** (13)	30,460	74–57
132	September 2	Mets	6–5	**Goltz** (7–7)	Pacella (3–3)	**Stanhouse** (4)	27,543	75–57
133	September 3	Mets	2–0	**Hooton** (13–5)	Zachry (6–9)	**Howe** (14)	28,568	76–57
134	September 4	Phillies	2–3	Walk (10–4)	**Reuss** (16–5)	McGraw (17)	41,864	76–58
135	September 5	Phillies	1–0	**Sutton** (10–4)	Carlton (21–8)	**Stanhouse** (5)	41,019	77–58
136	September 6	Phillies	7–3	**Welch** (12–9)	Lerch (4–14)	**Howe** (15)	45,995	78–58
137	September 7	Phillies	6–0	**Castillo** (6–6)	Ruthven (14–9)		39,083	79–58
138	September 9	@ Astros	4–5	Smith (6–5)	**Howe** (6–7)	Sambito (14)	34,546	79–59
139	September 10	@ Astros	5–6 (12)	Roberge (2–0)	**Sutcliffe** (3–9)		37,632	79–60
140	September 12	@ Reds	5–2	**Sutton** (11–4)	LaCoss (8–11)	**Howe** (16)	36,287	80–60
141	September 13	@ Reds	3–2	**Castillo** (7–6)	Soto (9–6)	**Stanhouse** (6)	38,542	81–60
142	September 14	@ Reds	3–1	**Reuss** (17–5)	Moskau (9–7)		34,038	82–60
143	September 15	@ Braves	0–9	Boggs (10–9)	**Hooton** (13–6)		8,025	82–61
144	September 16	@ Braves	1–2	Niekro (15–14)	**Goltz** (7–8)	Camp (17)	31,279	82–62
145	September 17	Padres	2–1	**Sutton** (12–4)	Eichelberger (4–2)	**Howe** (17)	28,822	83–62
146	September 18	Padres	7–3	**Welch** (13–9)	Wise (6–8)	**Castillo** (5)	30,738	84–62
147	September 19	Reds	7–10	LaCoss (9–11)	**Reuss** (17–6)	Hume (23)	46,609	84–63
148	September 20	Reds	2–10	Seaver (10–7)	**Hooton** (13–7)		50,240	84–64
149	September 21	Reds	2–7 (11)	Hume (8–10)	**Howe** (6–8)		43,716	84–65
150	September 22	Braves	2–7	Hanna (2–0)	**Sutton** (12–5)	Camp (19)	25,078	84–66
151	September 23	Braves	4–2	**Welch** (14–9)	Matula (11–13)	**Stanhouse** (7)	29,226	85–66
152	September 24	Giants	5–4 (12)	**Castillo** (8–6)	Rowland (1–1)		35,581	86–66
153	September 25	Giants	2–3	Whitson (11–11)	**Hooton** (13–8)	Lavelle (8)	33,460	86–67
154	September 26	@ Padres	2–3	Tellmann (2–0)	**Goltz** (7–9)	Fingers (23)	14,836	86–68
155	September 27	@ Padres	6–4	**Sutton** (13–5)	Rasmussen (4–11)	**Valenzuela** (1)	19,260	87–68
156	September 28	@ Padres	5–7	Fingers (11–9)	**Howe** (6–9)	Tellmann (1)	17,971	87–69
157	September 30	@ Giants	6–3 (10)	**Valenzuela** (1–0)	Lavelle (6–8)		10,953	88–69

October (4–2)

#	Date	Opponent	Score	Win	Loss	Save	Attendance	Record
158	October 1	@ Giants	8–4	**Hooton** (14–8)	Whitson (11–12)		11,307	89–69
159	October 2	@ Giants	2–3	Minton (4–6)	**Goltz** (7–10)	Holland (7)	11,693	89–70
160	October 3	Astros	3–2 (10)	**Valenzuela** (2–0)	Forsch (12–13)		49,642	90–70
161	October 4	Astros	2–1	**Reuss** (18–6)	Ryan (11–10)		46,085	91–70
162	October 5	Astros	4–3	**Howe** (7–9)	LaCorte (8–5)	**Sutton** (1)	52,339	92–70
163	October 6	Astros	1–7	Niekro (20–12)	**Goltz** (7–11)		51,127	92–71

Legend: = Win = Loss = Postponement
Bold = Dodgers team member

== Player stats ==
=== Batting ===
==== Starters by position ====
Note: Pos = Position; G = Games played; AB = At bats; H = Hits; Avg. = Batting average; HR = Home runs; RBI = Runs batted in

Pos	Player	G	AB	H	Avg.	HR	RBI
C	Steve Yeager	96	227	48	.211	2	20
1B	Steve Garvey	163	658	200	.304	26	106
2B	Davey Lopes	141	553	139	.251	10	49
SS	Bill Russell	130	466	123	.264	3	34
3B	Ron Cey	157	551	140	.254	28	77
LF	Dusty Baker	153	579	170	.294	29	97
CF	Rudy Law	128	388	101	.260	1	23
RF	Reggie Smith	92	311	100	.322	15	55

==== Other batters ====
Note: G = Games played; AB = At bats; H = Hits; Avg. = Batting average; HR = Home runs; RBI = Runs batted in

Player	G	AB	H	Avg.	HR	RBI
Derrel Thomas	117	297	79	.266	1	22
Jay Johnstone	109	251	77	.307	2	20
Rick Monday	96	194	52	.268	10	25
Pedro Guerrero	75	183	59	.322	7	31
Joe Ferguson	77	172	41	.238	9	29
Mike Scioscia	54	134	34	.254	1	8
Gary Thomasson	80	111	24	.216	1	12
Mickey Hatcher	57	84	19	.226	1	5
Jack Perconte	14	17	4	.235	0	2
Pepe Frías	14	9	2	.222	0	0
Manny Mota	7	7	3	.429	0	2
Vic Davalillo	7	6	1	.167	0	0
Bobby Mitchell	9	3	1	.333	0	0
Gary Weiss	8	0	0	----	0	0

=== Pitching ===
==== Starting pitchers ====
Note: G = Games pitched; IP = Innings pitched; W = Wins; L = Losses; ERA = Earned run average; SO = Strikeouts

Player	G	IP	W	L	ERA	SO
Jerry Reuss	37	229.1	18	6	2.51	111
Bob Welch	32	213.2	14	9	3.29	141
Don Sutton	32	212.1	13	5	2.20	128
Burt Hooton	34	206.2	14	8	3.66	118
Dave Goltz	35	171.1	7	11	4.31	91

==== Other pitchers ====
Note: G = Games pitched; IP = Innings pitched; W = Wins; L = Losses; ERA = Earned run average; SO = Strikeouts

Player	G	IP	W	L	ERA	SO
Rick Sutcliffe	42	110.0	3	9	5.56	59

==== Relief pitchers ====
Note: G = Games pitched; W = Wins; L = Losses; SV = Saves; ERA = Earned run average; SO = Strikeouts

Player	G	W	L	SV	ERA	SO
Steve Howe	59	7	9	17	2.66	39
Bobby Castillo	61	8	6	5	2.75	60
Joe Beckwith	38	3	3	0	1.96	40
Don Stanhouse	21	2	2	7	5.04	5
Charlie Hough	19	1	3	1	5.57	25
Fernando Valenzuela	10	2	0	1	0.00	16
Terry Forster	9	0	0	0	3.09	2

== Awards and honors ==
- 1980 Major League Baseball All-Star Game
  - Steve Garvey starter
  - Davey Lopes starter
  - Reggie Smith starter
  - Jerry Reuss reserve
  - Bob Welch reserve
- National League Rookie of the Year
  - Steve Howe
- Comeback Player of the Year Award
  - Jerry Reuss
- Baseball Digest Rookie All-Stars
  - Steve Howe
- Silver Slugger Award
  - Dusty Baker
- TSN National League All-Star
  - Dusty Baker
- NL Pitcher of the Month
  - Jerry Reuss (June 1980)
- NL Player of the Month
  - Dusty Baker (June 1980)
- NL Player of the Week
  - Don Sutton (Apr. 21–27)
  - Bob Welch (May 12–18)
  - Jerry Reuss (June 23–29)

== Farm system ==
Level	Team	League	Manager
**AAA**	**Albuquerque Dukes**	**Pacific Coast League**	**Del Crandall**
AA	San Antonio Dodgers	Texas League	Don LeJohn
A	Lodi Dodgers	California League	Dick McLaughlin
A	Vero Beach Dodgers	Florida State League	Stan Wasiak
**Rookie**	**Lethbridge Dodgers**	**Pioneer League**	**Gail Henley**

Teams in BOLD won League Championships

== Major League Baseball draft ==
The Dodgers drafted 36 players in the June draft and 16 in the January draft. Of those, six players would eventually play in the Major Leagues. The Dodgers did not have picks in rounds 2-4 this season as those picks were awarded to other teams as compensation for their signing of free agents.

The first round pick in the June draft was shortstop Ross Jones of the University of Miami. The Dodgers traded him to the New York Mets in 1983 and he would appear in 67 games in parts of three seasons with the Mets and two other teams, hitting only .221.

This was a fairly weak draft class for the Dodgers, with the most notable player being outfielder R. J. Reynolds, who was drafted in the 2nd round of the January draft and played 8 unremarkable seasons as a backup outfielder before finishing up his career in Japan with Nippon Professional Baseball.

1980 draft picks

=== January draft ===
Round	Name	Position	School	Signed	Career span	Highest level
1	David Lesch	RHP	Central Arizona College	Yes	1980	Rookie
2	R. J. Reynolds	OF	Sacramento City College	Yes	1980–1994	**MLB**
3	Larry See	3B	Cerritos College	Yes	1980–1999	**MLB**
4	Robert Allen	SS	Clemson University	Yes	1980–1987	AAA
5	Hollis Martin	SS	Potomac State College	Yes	1980–1981	A
6	Ralph Bryant	OF	Abraham Baldwin Agricultural College	No; Dodgers-1981	1981–1996	**MLB**
7	Mark Wenzel	RHP	Fresno City College	No		
8	Damon Hunt	OF	Sacramento City College	No; Giants-1983	1983	A
9	Paul Hagan	OF	South Georgia College	No		
10	David Bailor	OF	Yavapai College	No		
11	Brett Wise	RHP	Seminole Community College	Yes	1980–1984	AAA
12	Richard Lucero	RHP	Phoenix College	No		
13	Greg Hudson	RHP	Georgia Perimeter College	No		

==== January secondary phase ====
Round	Name	Position	School	Signed	Career span	Highest level
1	Ricky Wright	LHP	University of Texas at Austin	Yes	1980–1987	**MLB**
2	Jack Leonard	3B	Louisburg College	No		A
3	Harry Kazanjian	C	City College of San Francisco	No		

=== June draft ===
Round	Name	Position	School	Signed	Career span	Highest level
1	Ross Jones	SS	University of Miami	Yes	1980–1988	**MLB**
5	Peter Beall	SS	Mater Dei High School	No; Angels-1984	1984–1985	A
6	Paul Bard	C	Tufts University	Yes	1980–1984	AA
7	Gordon Gauntlett	C	University of California, Los Angeles	Yes	1980–1985	AA
8	Kevin Sliwinski	OF	Santiago High School	No; Blue Jays-1983	1983–1988	AAA
9	Stephen Marsden	RHP	University of Wisconsin–Madison	Yes	1980–1984	AAA
10	Ricky Thomas	OF	University of La Verne	No		
11	Curtis Reade	RHP	California State University, Fresno	Yes	1980–1983	A
12	Anthony Lachowetz	OF	Springfield College	Yes	1980–1982	A
13	Greg Smith	1B	Southern University and A&M College	Yes	1980–1993	AAA
14	Thomas Robinson	2B	Widener University	Yes	1980–1981	A
15	Charles Jones	RHP	University of New Hampshire	Yes	1980–1983	AA
16	Frank Dente	RHP	Palm Beach Community College	Yes	1980–1982	AA
17	Richard Lloyd	RHP	East Valley High School	Yes	1980–1982	A-
18	Pasquale Raimondo	2B	University at Buffalo, State University of New York	Yes	1980–1981	A
19	Tom Klawitter	LHP	University of Wisconsin at Madison	Yes	1980–1986	**MLB**
20	William Cole	OF	Eastern Michigan University	Yes	1980–1981	A
21	Jon Debus	OF	University of St. Francis	Yes	1980–1989	AAA
22	Francis McQuade	RHP	Elmhurst College	Yes	1980	Rookie
23	Phillip Webber	OF	San Bernardino Valley College	Yes	1980	Rookie
24	Jerry Bendorf	SS	Gonzaga University	No; Dodgers-1981	1981–1982	AA
25	Robert Kenyon	RHP	Clemson University	Yes	1980–1983	AA
26	Jim Pacanowski	C	Downers Grove High School	No		
27	Cori Ryan	RHP	Colorado State University	No		
28	Todd Zacher	2B	University of Arkansas	No; Giants-1981	1981–1983	AAA
29	Gregory Hull	OF	Hiram Johnson High School	No		
30	Thomas Woleslagel	SS	Ross High School	No; Yankees-1984	1984–1985	A
31	Michael Strawberry	OF	Los Angeles Southwest College	Yes	1980–1981	A
32	Hank DeMello	C	Roseville High School	No		

==== June secondary phase ====
Round	Name	Position	School	Signed	Career span	Highest level
1	Robert Allen	SS	Clemson University	Yes	1980–1987	AAA
2	Rick Felt	LHP	Georgia Perimeter College	Yes	1980–1985	AAA
3	Michael Carringer	RHP	Bacone College	No		
