= 1980 St. Louis Cardinals season =

Major League Baseball season

1980 St. Louis Cardinals
- League: National League
- Division: East
- Ballpark: Busch Memorial Stadium
- City: St. Louis, Missouri
- Record: 74–88 (.457)
- Divisional place: 4th
- Owners: August "Gussie" Busch
- General managers: John Claiborne, Whitey Herzog
- Managers: Ken Boyer, Jack Krol, Whitey Herzog, Red Schoendienst
- Television: KSDK (Jack Buck, Mike Shannon, Jay Randolph, Dan Kelly)
- Radio: KMOX (Jack Buck, Mike Shannon, Dan Kelly)

The 1980 St. Louis Cardinals season was the team's 99th season in St. Louis, Missouri, and the 89th season in the National League. The Cardinals went 74–88 during the season and finished fourth in the National League East, 17 games behind the eventual NL pennant and World Series champion Philadelphia Phillies.

The Cardinals played the season under four different managers, Ken Boyer (fired June 8 between games of a double-header against the Expos in Montreal), Jack Krol (the second game of the double-header that same day), Whitey Herzog (June 9 until he was hired as the team's general manager in late August, succeeding John Claiborne, who was fired earlier in August) and Red Schoendienst (from late August to end of season). After the season, Herzog reclaimed the managerial job.

This team set a record for the most Silver Slugger Award winners in one season: Keith Hernández (first base), Garry Templeton (shortstop), George Hendrick (outfielder), Ted Simmons (catcher), and Bob Forsch (pitcher). Hernández also won a Gold Glove.

== Offseason ==
- October 17, 1979: Mike Tyson was traded by the Cardinals to the Chicago Cubs for Donnie Moore.
- March 31, 1980: Will McEnaney was released by the St. Louis Cardinals.

== Regular season ==
=== Season standings ===
NL East
Team	W	L	Pct.	GB	Home	Road
Philadelphia Phillies	91	71	.562	—	49‍–‍32	42‍–‍39
Montreal Expos	90	72	.556	1	51‍–‍29	39‍–‍43
Pittsburgh Pirates	83	79	.512	8	47‍–‍34	36‍–‍45
St. Louis Cardinals	74	88	.457	17	41‍–‍40	33‍–‍48
New York Mets	67	95	.414	24	38‍–‍44	29‍–‍51
Chicago Cubs	64	98	.395	27	37‍–‍44	27‍–‍54

=== Record vs. opponents ===
1980 National League record Sources:
Team	ATL	CHC	CIN	HOU	LAD	MON	NYM	PHI	PIT	SD	SF	STL
Atlanta	—	8–4	2–16	7–11	11–7	5–7	3–9	5–7	11–1	12–6	11–6	6–6
Chicago	4–8	—	7–5	1–11	5–7	6–12	10–8	5–13	8–10	4–8	5–7	9–9
Cincinnati	16–2	5–7	—	8–10	9–9	3–9	8–4	7–5	6–6	15–3–1	7–11	5–7
Houston	11–7	11–1	10–8	—	9–10	5–7	8–4	3–9	7–5	11–7	11–7	7–5
Los Angeles	7–11	7–5	9–9	10–9	—	11–1	7–5	6–6	6–6	9–9	13–5	7–5
Montreal	7–5	12–6	9–3	7–5	1–11	—	10–8	9–9	6–12	10–2	7–5	12–6
New York	9–3	8–10	4–8	4–8	5–7	8–10	—	6–12	10–8	1–11	3–9	9–9
Philadelphia	7-5	13–5	5–7	9–3	6–6	9–9	12–6	—	7–11	8–4	6–6	9–9
Pittsburgh	1–11	10–8	6–6	5–7	6–6	12–6	8–10	11–7	—	6–6	8–4	10–8
San Diego	6–12	8–4	3–15–1	7–11	9–9	2–10	11–1	4–8	6–6	—	10–8	7–5
San Francisco	6–11	7–5	11–7	7–11	5–13	5–7	9–3	6–6	4–8	8–10	—	7–5
St. Louis	6–6	9–9	7–5	5–7	5–7	6–12	9–9	9–9	8–10	5–7	5–7	—

=== Opening Day starters ===
- Bobby Bonds
- George Hendrick
- Keith Hernandez
- Ken Oberkfell
- Ken Reitz
- Tony Scott
- Ted Simmons
- Garry Templeton
- Pete Vuckovich

=== Notable transactions ===
- April 2, 1980: Roger Freed was released by the Cardinals.
- April 7, 1980: Jeff Little was signed as a free agent with the Cardinals.
- April 30, 1980: Pedro Borbón was signed as a free agent with the Cardinals.
- April 30, 1980: Jim Kaat was purchased by the Cardinals from the New York Yankees.
- May 9, 1980: Darold Knowles was released by the Cardinals.
- May 27, 1980: Pedro Borbón was released by the Cardinals.
- June 2, 1980: Jim Lentine was traded by the Cardinals to the Detroit Tigers for Al Greene and John Martin.
- June 3, 1980: Dan Plesac was drafted by the Cardinals in the 2nd round of the 1980 Major League Baseball draft, but did not sign.

=== Roster ===
1980 St. Louis Cardinals roster
Roster
Pitchers: 49 Pedro Borbón; 31 Bob Forsch; 39 George Frazier; 41 John Fulgham; 26 Don Hood; 36 Jim Kaat; 34 Darold Knowles; 32 Mark Littell; 43 Jeff Little; 50 John Littlefield; 33 John Martin; 35 Silvio Martínez; 33 Donnie Moore; 47 Al Olmsted; 34 Jim Otten; 46 Andy Rincon; 48 Kim Seaman; 42 Bob Sykes; 43 Roy Thomas; 38 John Urrea; 46,40 Pete Vuckovich	Catchers: 16 Terry Kennedy; 23 Ted Simmons; 9 Steve Swisher; Infielders: 7 Joe DeSa; 37 Keith Hernandez; 28 Tom Herr; 24 Ken Oberkfell; 5 Mike Phillips; 4 Mike Ramsey; 44 Ken Reitz; 1 Garry Templeton; 12 Tye Waller	Outfielders: 00 Bobby Bonds; 10 Leon Durham; 25 George Hendrick; 19 Dane Iorg; 21 Tito Landrum; 21 Jim Lentine; 30 Tony Scott; 3,11 Keith Smith; Other batters: 11 Bernie Carbo	Manager: 14 Ken Boyer; 3 Whitey Herzog; 8 Jack Krol; 2 Red Schoendienst; Coaches: 8 Jack Krol; 27 Dal Maxvill; 18 Claude Osteen; 15 Dave Ricketts; 2 Red Schoendienst

== Player stats ==
=== Batting ===
==== Starters by position ====
Note: Pos = Position; G = Games played; AB = At bats; H = Hits; Avg. = Batting average; HR = Home runs; RBI = Runs batted in

Pos	Player	G	AB	H	Avg.	HR	RBI
C	Ted Simmons	145	495	150	.303	21	98
1B	Keith Hernandez	159	595	191	.321	16	99
2B	Ken Oberkfell	116	422	128	.303	3	46
SS	Garry Templeton	118	504	161	.319	4	43
3B	Ken Reitz	151	523	141	.270	8	58
LF	Bobby Bonds	86	231	47	.203	5	24
CF	Tony Scott	143	415	104	.251	0	28
RF	George Hendrick	150	572	173	.302	25	109

==== Other batters ====
Note: G = Games played; AB = At bats; H = Hits; Avg. = Batting average; HR = Home runs; RBI = Runs batted in

Player	G	AB	H	Avg.	HR	RBI
Leon Durham	96	303	82	.271	8	42
Dane Iorg	105	251	76	.303	3	36
Terry Kennedy	84	248	63	.254	4	34
Tom Herr	76	222	55	.248	0	15
Mike Phillips	63	128	30	.234	0	7
Mike Ramsey	59	126	33	.262	0	8
Tito Landrum	35	77	19	.247	0	7
Keith Smith	24	31	4	.129	0	2
Steve Swisher	18	24	6	.250	0	2
Tye Waller	5	12	1	.083	0	0
Bernie Carbo	14	11	2	.182	0	0
Joe DeSa	7	11	3	.273	0	0
Jim Lentine	9	10	1	.100	0	1

=== Pitching ===
==== Starting pitchers ====
Note: G = Games pitched; IP = Innings pitched; W = Wins; L = Losses; ERA = Earned run average; SO = Strikeouts

Player	G	IP	W	L	ERA	SO
Pete Vuckovich	32	222.1	12	9	3.40	132
Bob Forsch	31	214.2	11	10	3.77	87
Bob Sykes	27	126.0	6	10	4.64	50
Silvio Martínez	25	119.2	5	10	4.81	39
John Fulgham	15	85.1	4	6	3.38	48
Al Olmsted	5	34.2	1	1	2.86	14
Andy Rincon	4	31.0	3	1	2.61	22

==== Other pitchers ====
Note: G = Games pitched; IP = Innings pitched; W = Wins; L = Losses; ERA = Earned run average; SO = Strikeouts

Player	G	IP	W	L	ERA	SO
Jim Kaat	49	129.2	8	7	3.82	36
Don Hood	33	82.1	4	6	3.39	35
Roy Thomas	24	55.0	2	3	4.75	22
John Martin	9	42.0	2	3	4.29	23
Jeff Little	7	18.2	1	1	3.86	17

==== Relief pitchers ====
Note: G = Games pitched; W = Wins; L = Losses; SV = Saves; ERA = Earned run average; SO = Strikeouts

Player	G	W	L	SV	ERA	SO
John Littlefield	52	5	5	9	3.14	22
Jim Otten	31	0	5	0	5.53	38
John Urrea	30	4	1	3	3.48	36
Kim Seaman	26	3	2	4	3.42	10
George Frazier	22	1	4	3	2.74	11
Mark Littell	14	0	2	2	3.86	17
Donnie Moore	11	1	1	0	6.23	10
Pedro Borbón	10	1	0	1	3.79	4
Darold Knowles	2	0	1	0	10.80	1

== Farm system ==
Level	Team	League	Manager
AAA	Springfield Redbirds	American Association	Hal Lanier
AA	Arkansas Travelers	Texas League	Sonny Ruberto
A	St. Petersburg Cardinals	Florida State League	Tommy Thompson
A	Gastonia Cardinals	South Atlantic League	Nick Leyva
Rookie	Johnson City Cardinals	Appalachian League	Johnny Lewis

LEAGUE CHAMPIONS: Springfield, Arkansas
