= Al Olmsted =

American baseball player (born 1957)

- Pitcher
- Born: March 18, 1957 (age 69); St. Louis, Missouri, U.S.
- Batted: Right Threw: Left

MLB debut
- September 12, 1980, for the St. Louis Cardinals

Last MLB appearance
- October 3, 1980, for the St. Louis Cardinals

MLB statistics
- Win–loss record: 1–1
- Earned run average: 2.86
- Strikeouts: 14
- Stats at Baseball Reference

Teams
- St. Louis Cardinals (1980)

Alan Ray Olmsted (born March 18, 1957) is an American former professional baseball pitcher. He played in 5 games in Major League Baseball (MLB) for the St. Louis Cardinals in 1980.

== Pre-MLB baseball ==
The Cardinals drafted Olmsted in the June 1975 amateur draft (13th round) out of Hazelwood High School (Florissant, Missouri). He spent the next 4 seasons (1976–1979) working his way through the Cardinals' minor league system from the rookie leagues through the AA level.

Olmsted began the 1980 season with the AA Arkansas Travelers in the Texas League before being promoted to the AAA Springfield Redbirds of the American Association. He was promoted to the major league level in September 1980 as a September call-up.

== September 1980 ==
Olmsted made his MLB debut on September 12 starting the second game of a double-header against the Philadelphia Phillies at Veterans Stadium. Pitching shutout baseball for 9 1/3 innings, he yielded to the bullpen as the Cardinals eventually won, 5–0, in 11 innings.

Olmsted's second start came on September 20 when the Cardinals hosted the Montreal Expos. Pitching 5 1/3 innings and giving up 4 runs, he posted another no-decision. The Expos' 9th inning run gave the visitors a 5–4 victory.

Olmsted's only victory game on September 23 when the Cardinals defeated the Phillies, 6–3. As the game's starting pitcher, he surrendered 6 hits and 3 runs over 8 1/3 innings. Although he left the game with the bases loaded, the bullpen put out the next 2 batters to preserve the victory.

Olmsted gave up 2 runs on 4 hits through the first 6 innings against the New York Mets at Shea Stadium on September 28. The Cardinals gave up an additional 6 runs in the 8th inning as Olmsted was tagged with his only career loss in the 8–0 final.

In his final career start on October 3, Olmsted gave up 4 runs to the Mets over 5 2/3 innings. Although the Cardinals would win, 6–4, he ended his MLB career with a no decision.

Over Olmsted's 5 starts, he pitched 34 2/3 innings, yielding 13 runs (11 earned) on 32 hits, walking 14, and striking out another 14.

== Post-MLB baseball ==
Following the 1980 season, Olmsted was involved in a multi-player trade when the Cardinals sent him along with pitchers John Littlefield, Kim Seaman, and John Urrea, catchers Terry Kennedy and Steve Swisher, and utility infielder Mike Phillips to the San Diego Padres for pitchers Rollie Fingers (who would be traded to the Milwaukee Brewers a few days later) and Bob Shirley, catcher/first baseman Gene Tenace, and minor league catcher Bob Geren. He spent the 1981 baseball season with the Hawaii Islanders, the Padres' AAA affiliate in the Pacific Coast League.

In February 1982, Olmsted was again involved in a multi-player trade between the same two teams when he was the "player to be named later" in a December 1981 trade in which the Padres sent him along with pitcher Steve Mura and shortstop Ozzie Smith to the Cardinals in exchange for pitcher Luis DeLeón, right-fielder Sixto Lezcano, and shortstop Garry Templeton. He completed his professional career in 1982 playing for the Louisville Redbirds, the Cardinals' AAA farm team in the American Association.
