= Kim Seaman =

American baseball player (born 1957)

- Pitcher
- Born: May 6, 1957 (age 68); Pascagoula, Mississippi, U.S.
- Batted: Left Threw: Left

MLB debut
- September 28, 1979, for the St. Louis Cardinals

Last MLB appearance
- September 27, 1980, for the St. Louis Cardinals

MLB statistics
- Win–loss record: 3–2
- Earned run average: 3.16
- Strikeouts: 13
- Stats at Baseball Reference

Teams
- St. Louis Cardinals (1979–1980)

Kim Michael Seaman (born May 6, 1957) is an American former professional baseball pitcher who appeared in 27 games for the St. Louis Cardinals of Major League Baseball (MLB) during the 1979 and 1980 baseball seasons.

== Early career ==
Seaman attended and played high school baseball with Live Oak Academy before attending Mississippi Gulf Coast Community College.

Seaman was drafted by the Houston Astros in the June 1975 Major League Baseball draft, but did not sign. Seven months later he was drafted by the New York Mets in the 4th round of the January 1976 Major League Baseball draft. He played in the Mets' minor leagues for the 1976–1978 seasons.

== St. Louis Cardinals ==
Seaman was traded, along with Tom Grieve, from the Mets to the St. Louis Cardinals for Pete Falcone at the Winter Meetings on December 5, 1978. The following season he played for the Springfield Redbirds, the Cardinals' AAA affiliate in the American Association. Seaman was promoted to the major league level in September 1979 as a September call-up.

Seaman made his MLB debut on September 28, 1979, pitching two innings of scoreless, no-hit relief (although he did surrender two walks) against the New York Mets in the first game of a double-header; the Cardinals lost 6–2. He began the 1980 season back with the AAA Redbirds but was recalled to the major league level in June. Seaman remained with the Cardinals for the remainder of the season appearing in 26 games, all in relief, finishing with a 3–2 record, earning four saves. During that time, he came to bat only once, striking out, leading to his .000 batting average; however, he did possess a perfect (1.000) fielding percentage (one putout and three assists).

== Post-MLB baseball ==
Following the 1980 season, Seaman was involved in a multi-player trade when the Cardinals sent him along with pitchers John Littlefield, Al Olmsted, and John Urrea, catchers Terry Kennedy and Steve Swisher, and utility infielder Mike Phillips to the San Diego Padres for pitchers Rollie Fingers (who would be traded to the Milwaukee Brewers a few days later) and Bob Shirley, catcher/first baseman Gene Tenace, and minor league catcher Bob Geren. He spent the 1981 baseball season with the Hawaii Islanders, the Padres' AAA affiliate in the Pacific Coast League.

Seaman began the 1982 season in Hawaii, but in May was traded to the Montreal Expos for second baseman Jerry Manuel. He finished the season with the Wichita Aeros, the Expos' AAA farm team in the American Association.

Seaman finished his professional career pitching for the Vancouver Canadians, the Milwaukee Brewers' AAA affiliate in the Pacific Coast League.

== Personal life ==
Seaman now resides in the city of Pascagoula, Mississippi where he is a Commercial/Residential Real Estate Appraiser. He enjoys fishing and golfing in his free time. He has one son named Tyler who has also played briefly in the minor leagues.
