= Rollie Fingers =

American baseball player (born 1946)

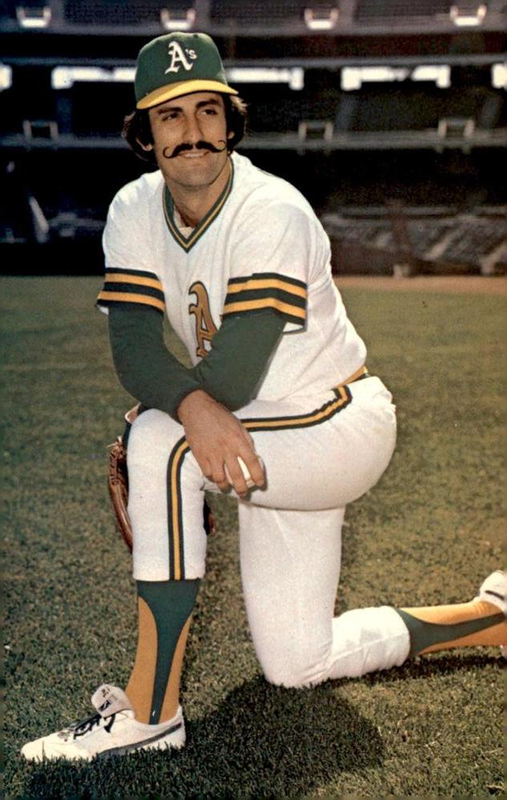
- Fingers with the Oakland Athletics in 1975
- Pitcher
- Born: August 25, 1946 (age 80); Steubenville, Ohio, U.S.
- Batted: Right Threw: Right

MLB debut
- September 15, 1968, for the Oakland Athletics

Last MLB appearance
- September 17, 1985, for the Milwaukee Brewers

MLB statistics
- Win–loss record: 114–118
- Earned run average: 2.90
- Strikeouts: 1,299
- Saves: 341
- Stats at Baseball Reference

Teams
- Oakland Athletics (1968–1976); San Diego Padres (1977–1980); Milwaukee Brewers (1981–1982, 1984–1985)

Career highlights and awards
- 7× All-Star (1973–1976, 1978, 1981, 1982); 3× World Series champion (1972–1974); AL MVP (1981); AL Cy Young Award (1981); World Series MVP (1974); 4× Rolaids Relief Man Award (1977, 1978, 1980, 1981); 3× MLB saves leader (1977, 1978, 1981); Pitched a combined no-hitter on September 28, 1975; Athletics No. 34 retired; Milwaukee Brewers No. 34 retired; Athletics Hall of Fame; Milwaukee Brewers Wall of Honor; American Family Field Walk of Fame

Member of the National

Baseball Hall of Fame
- Induction: 1992
- Vote: 81.2% (second ballot)

Roland Glen Fingers (born August 25, 1946) is an American former right handed relief pitcher in Major League Baseball who played for three teams between 1968 and 1985. His effectiveness helped to redefine the value of relievers within baseball and to usher in the modern closer role. A seven-time All-Star, he led the major leagues in saves three times, and was named Rolaids Relief Man of the Year four times. He first gained prominence as a member of the Oakland Athletics championship teams of the early 1970s, when his flamboyant handlebar mustache made him perhaps the most identifiable member of The Mustache Gang, which led Oakland to become the only non-New York Yankees team ever to win three consecutive World Series titles. Fingers was named the Most Valuable Player of the 1974 World Series after earning a win in the opener and saves in the last three games to secure the title.

Fingers joined the San Diego Padres as a free agent after the 1976 season, and led the major leagues with 35 saves in 1977 before tying the National League (NL) single season record with 37 saves the following year. Traded to the Milwaukee Brewers after the 1980 season, he led that team to its first playoff appearance in 1981, receiving the American League (AL) Most Valuable Player Award and Cy Young Award after earning 28 saves in the strike-shortened season with an earned run average (ERA) of only 1.04, allowing just 9 runs in 78 innings pitched. He also helped them reach the 1982 World Series.

Having surpassed Hoyt Wilhelm's major league record for career saves in 1980, Fingers was the first pitcher to reach 300 saves, and retired after the 1985 season with 341 saves, which remained the record until surpassed by Jeff Reardon in 1992. He set franchise records for career saves for all three of his teams, holding the Athletics mark from 1973 to 1990, the Padres record from 1977 to 1997, and the Brewers record from 1984 to 1989. He is also particularly remembered for his "long saves" of two or more innings, for which he still holds the record of 135. At the end of his career he also ranked third in major league history in career games pitched (944), relief wins (107) and relief innings pitched (1,505 2/3), and second in strikeouts in relief (1,183); he held the Padres franchise record for career games pitched from 1980 to 1989. His career ERA of 2.90 ranked eighth among pitchers with at least 1,500 innings pitched after 1930. Fingers was inducted into the National Baseball Hall of Fame in 1992, making him just the second reliever elected after Wilhelm. Both the Athletics and Brewers retired his uniform number following his induction.

== Early life ==
Fingers was born in Steubenville, Ohio, to George Michael Fingers and Edna Pearl (née Stafford) Fingers. His father (who had played minor league baseball for the St. Louis Cardinals and roomed with Stan Musial), worked in a Steubenville steel mill. One day, George Fingers came home from work fed up and said, "That's it, we're moving to California." His father then sold the house for $1,500, bought a car, and took the family to Cucamonga (San Bernardino County), a town which was later incorporated (together with three others) as the city of Rancho Cucamonga. They could not afford hotels, so they slept in sleeping bags beside the highway. After arriving in California, George Fingers eventually had to go back to being a steelworker at the nearby Kaiser Steel mill.

Fingers attended Upland High School in nearby Upland. He attended one semester at Chaffey Junior College.

== Professional career ==
=== Minor leagues ===
The Los Angeles Dodgers offered Fingers a signing bonus of $20,000, but Fingers thought he had no chance to reach the major leagues for years because the Dodgers had a solid pitching staff including Sandy Koufax and Don Drysdale, they were already winning pennants, and their farm system appeared to be full of talented players. He turned down the Dodgers' offer and signed with the Kansas City Athletics for less money (a $13,000 signing bonus) on Christmas Eve 1964. At first, the Athletics did not know whether to make him a pitcher or outfielder, but after deciding to play him as a pitcher, he was assigned to the Leesburg A's of the Class A Florida State League for the 1965 season. In 1966, he played for the Modesto Reds of the Class A California League, and he played for two seasons (1968 and 1969) for the Birmingham A's of the Class AA Southern League.

On minor league opening day 1967 in Birmingham—just nine days after he married his high school sweetheart Jill, the Upland High School team statistician—a hit baseball struck Fingers in the face, breaking his cheekbone, jaw, and knocking out some teeth. His jaw was wired shut for five weeks, and when he returned to action, Fingers jumped every time the ball was hit; it took him about half the remaining season to get used to being on the mound again.

Fingers was a starting pitcher throughout his minor league career.

=== Oakland Athletics (1968–1976) ===
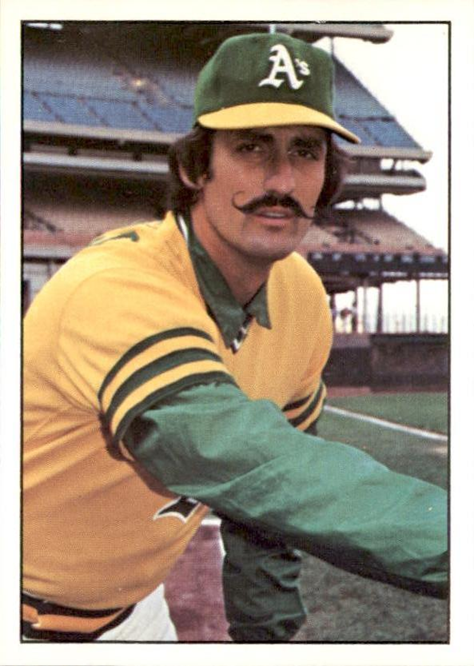
Fingers in 1976 card for Oakland Athletics

He joined the Athletics late in the 1968 season, their first after relocating to Oakland, and made his major league debut in relief on September 15 in a road game against the Detroit Tigers. It was a disastrous beginning, as he allowed four hits including a Bill Freehan home run, walked one batter and hit another, and threw a wild pitch, allowing four runs while getting just four outs en route to a 13–0 loss; it was his only appearance of the year. The 1969 season was a dramatic improvement; he picked up his first career win with a complete game shutout on April 22, a 7-0 road win against the Minnesota Twins, and earned his first save on May 13 against the Boston Red Sox. Fingers started 19 games in 1970; however, a May 15, 1971 road start against the Kansas City Royals was his last in regular rotation. During that game, he gave up one run on four hits in five full innings. On April 29, he recorded a career-high 10 strikeouts in a 3–2 loss to the Baltimore Orioles, a pitching duel with Jim Palmer; it was the last complete game he would pitch. Fingers was called upon as a reliever in a game on May 21, entering in the first inning against the Twins in Oakland after starter Blue Moon Odom gave up three runs and three walks in just eight batters. Fingers pitched 5 1/3 innings, allowing three hits and two runs. Late that month, Athletics manager Dick Williams decided that Fingers would be the late-inning closer. Beginning with that game and continuing until July 15, Fingers recorded 30 2/3 consecutive scoreless innings, with 11 scoreless appearances in between including a win and six saves, as well as a 7-inning relief stint on July 9 against the California Angels.

During the 1972 season, Fingers entered games in the fifth inning on four occasions, but mostly entered in the sixth inning or later. He did start two games in 1973—April 21 at home versus the Angels and May 7 on the road against the Orioles, the latter being the final start of his career. Other than those two games, for the remainder of his career, his earliest entrance into a game was in the sixth inning, which happened on three more occasions. He usually entered in the seventh, eighth, or ninth innings. During the 1973 season, Fingers broke John Wyatt's record of 73 career saves with the Athletics.

Fingers was part of the Oakland Athletics team that accomplished the first modern-day "three-peat," winning the World Series in 1972, 1973, and 1974. For the third of those championships, he won the World Series Most Valuable Player Award, earning three saves and one win during the Series.

Just prior to the start of the 1974 World Series against the Los Angeles Dodgers, Fingers and Odom got into a fight in the A's locker room after Odom made a comment about Fingers's wife. Though the incident lasted less than a minute, Fingers required six stitches on his head, and Odom sprained his ankle and had a noticeable limp.

With the end of baseball's reserve clause, all players not under a multi-year contract were set to become free agents after the 1976 season. Believing he would not be able to afford to re-sign his key players, Athletics' owner Charlie Finley attempted to sell Fingers and Joe Rudi to the Boston Red Sox for $1 million each and Vida Blue to the New York Yankees for $1.5 million in June. Bowie Kuhn, the Commissioner of Baseball, nullified the sale, saying that the transactions were "not in the best interests of baseball". Finley sued Kuhn, and he benched Fingers, Rudi and Blue, saying that they belonged to other teams. Members of the Athletics threatened to strike against Finley if they did not play, and Finley relented.

=== San Diego Padres (1977–1980) ===
After the season, Fingers signed with the San Diego Padres as a free agent.

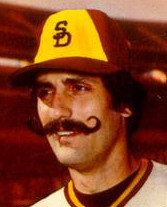
Fingers as a Padre in 1977

Fingers won the Rolaids Relief Man of the Year Award in 1977, 1978, and 1980 with the Padres. He was the Sporting News Reliever of the Year in those same years. In his first season with the club, he easily passed the young franchise's record of 16 career saves, shared by Vicente Romo and Butch Metzger, and in 1978 he tied Clay Carroll's NL single-season record of 37 saves; the mark was again tied the following year by Bruce Sutter, who eventually shattered the record with 45 saves in 1984. Near the end of his time with the Padres, Fingers passed teammate Randy Jones to become the club's career leader with 265 games pitched.

=== Milwaukee Brewers (1981–1982, 1984–1985) ===
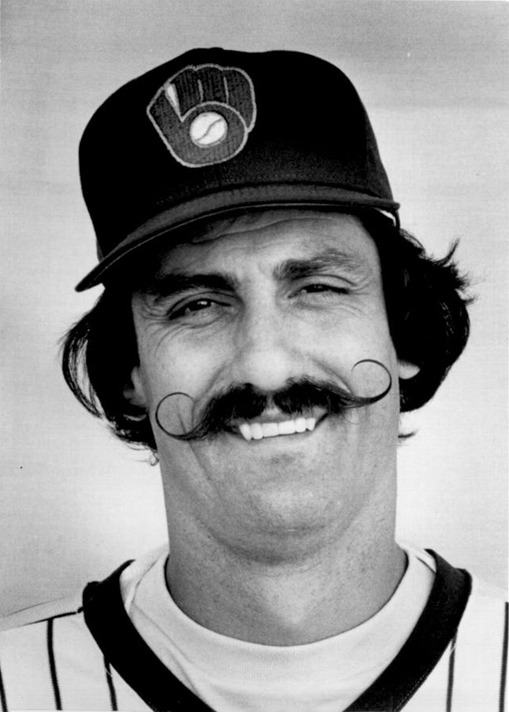
1981 photo of Fingers for Milwaukee Brewers

After the 1980 season, on December 8, the Padres traded Fingers, Gene Tenace, Bob Shirley, and a player to be named later (later selected to be Bob Geren) to the St. Louis Cardinals for Terry Kennedy, John Littlefield, Al Olmsted, Mike Phillips, Kim Seaman, Steve Swisher, and John Urrea. A few days later, the Cardinals traded Fingers, Ted Simmons, and Pete Vuckovich to the Milwaukee Brewers for Sixto Lezcano, Lary Sorensen, David Green, and Dave LaPoint. In 1981, Fingers won the Sporting News Reliever of the Year, Rolaids Relief Man of the Year Award, the American League Most Valuable Player Award (a first for an American League relief pitcher), and the AL Cy Young Award, as the Brewers reached the playoffs for the first time in their 13-year history. He saved 29 games for the 1982 Brewers, but pitched most of the season in pain and was forced to miss the 1982 World Series, where they lost in seven games by the Cardinals. Fingers missed the 1983 season with injury, and had a laminectomy to remove a herniated disk from his back in August 1984. During the 1984 season he passed Ken Sanders' career record of 61 saves for the Brewers.

On September 4, 1985, Fingers broke Sparky Lyle's American League record of 232 career saves, retiring the side in the 9th inning of an 11-10 road win against the Twins. His last major league appearance was on September 17 against the Orioles at Memorial Stadium; he pitched in relief of Teddy Higuera in the bottom of the eighth inning, facing two batters. He allowed a home run to Gary Roenicke, but struck out Rick Dempsey to end the inning as the Orioles won 6–0.

At the end of his career, after being released by the Brewers the previous season, he was offered a contract by Pete Rose to play for the Cincinnati Reds for 1986, but owner Marge Schott had a "clean cut" policy for her players, mandating that all players must be clean shaven. Fingers's reply to Reds general manager Bill Bergesch was: "Well, you tell Marge Schott to shave her Saint Bernard, and I'll shave my moustache".

Largely because of changes in relief pitching and the increased use of closers which he had helped popularize, Fingers's various team and league records were surpassed in the years following his retirement. Dan Quisenberry broke his AL record of 233 career saves in 1987, and Jeff Reardon broke his major league mark of 341 in 1992. His team records for career saves also fell, with his 97 saves with the Brewers passed by Dan Plesac in 1989, his 136 saves with the Athletics broken by Dennis Eckersley in 1990, and his 108 saves with the Padres broken by Trevor Hoffman in 1997. Eric Show broke his Padres record of 265 games pitched in 1989.

== Helping redefine modern relief pitching ==
When Fingers reached the major leagues, the role of relief pitchers was limited, as starting pitchers rarely left games while holding a lead; but as team offense increased following the 1968 season, and especially with the American League's introduction of the designated hitter in 1973, managers became more willing to replace starters in the late innings with a lead in order to forestall any late rallies by opponents. Through the 1960s, both leagues' annual saves leaders tended toward totals of 20–25 saves; few pitchers remained in the role more than two or three years, with significant exceptions such as Roy Face and knuckleballer Hoyt Wilhelm. But in the 1970s—in an era allowing for greater opportunities for closers than had previously been available—Fingers's excellence in relief allowed him to gradually increase his annual saves totals past 30. In 1980, he broke Wilhelm's record of 227 saves, and he eventually finished with 341—a record that stood until Jeff Reardon passed it in 1992.

Fingers is regarded as a pioneer of modern relief pitching, defining the role of the closer for years to come. As had generally been true in baseball through the 1960s, Fingers was moved to the bullpen—and eventually to his role as a closer—because of struggles with starting. Before Fingers's time, a former starter's renewed success in the bullpen led back to a spot in the starting rotation. However, with the successes of Fingers and contemporaries such as Sparky Lyle and Goose Gossage, it has been widely accepted that an excellent pitcher might actually provide a greater benefit to his team as a closer than as a third or fourth starter. (Gossage, for example, was moved to the starting rotation after first serving as a reliever for a few seasons. As a starter, he pitched 17 complete games, but was clobbered and eventually was moved back to the bullpen permanently.) As a result, later teams have been more willing to move successful starters—notably Dennis Eckersley, Dave Righetti, and John Smoltz—to the permanent role of closer, with no plans to bring them back to the rotation. (Smoltz bucked that trend by successfully returning to the rotation in 2005.) In 2006, Bruce Sutter became the first pitcher in baseball history elected to the Hall of Fame who never started a game in his major league career.

== Mustache ==
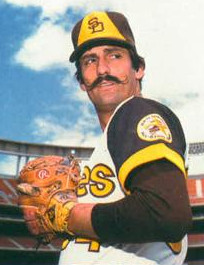
Fingers with his mustache in 1978 photo

In addition to his pitching ability, Fingers was noted for his waxed handlebar mustache, which he originally grew to get a $300 bonus from Athletics owner Charles O. Finley. On the first day of spring training for the 1972 season, Reggie Jackson showed up with a beard. In protest—and believing the Athletics' management would want Jackson to shave—Fingers and a few other players started going without shaving to force Jackson to shave off his beard. Instead, Finley, ever the showman who would do almost anything to sell tickets, then offered prize money to the player who could best grow and maintain their facial hair until Opening Day—April 15 versus Minnesota. Fingers went all out for the monetary incentive offered by Finley and patterned his mustache after the images of the players of the late 19th century. Taking it even further, Finley came up with "Mustache Day" at the ballpark, where any fan with a mustache could get in free.

Catfish Hunter and Ken Holtzman also went for the bonus, but Fingers with his Snidely Whiplash took the prize. Fingers later said, "Most of us would have grown one anywhere on our bodies for $300." The players became known as the "Moustache Gang." Although most former Athletics players shaved off their mustaches after the team traded most of their players in 1975–76, Fingers maintained his after signing with the Padres as a free agent in 1977, and he still has the mustache today.

== Honors and later life ==
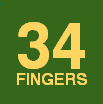
Rollie Fingers's number 34 was retired by the Oakland Athletics in 1993.

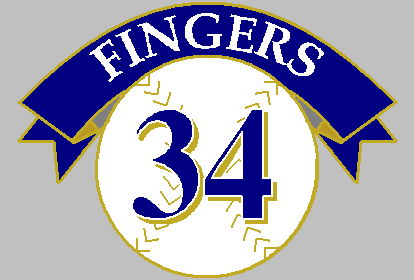
Rollie Fingers's number 34 was retired by the Milwaukee Brewers in 1992.

In 1992, Fingers was inducted into the National Baseball Hall of Fame, joining Wilhelm to become only the second reliever inducted. Bruce Sutter, Goose Gossage, Trevor Hoffman, Mariano Rivera, Lee Smith, and Billy Wagner have since followed, as has Dennis Eckersley (who was a starter for the first half of his career and a reliever for the second half).

In 1999, Fingers ranked 96th on The Sporting News list of Baseball's Greatest Players, and was nominated as a finalist for the Major League Baseball All-Century Team. Fingers later pitched a season in the short-lived Senior Professional Baseball Association.

Fingers is one of only ten players who have had their numbers retired from more than one team.

In 2000, Fingers was inducted into the San Diego Hall of Champions, honoring that city's finest athletes both on and off the playing surface.

In December 2020, Fingers's World Series championship ring was sold at auction for $75,330.

=== Income tax controversy ===
Sports Illustrated reported on January 2, 2007, that Fingers owed the state of Wisconsin more than $1.4 million in income taxes dating back to his time with the Brewers (including $1.1 million in interest) and was at the time the seventh biggest tax delinquent in the state. Fingers disputed the claim, saying he was shocked when he learned of it in 2005 and that taxes had been properly withheld from his Brewers paychecks.

On August 15, the Associated Press reported that Fingers's name had been removed from Wisconsin's delinquent tax list the previous month. "That's all been taken care of," he told the AP. "I've had more people try to tell me, 'You know, you owe $1.4 million.' I said, 'No, I don't.' We got all that squared away. I had to go all the way back to 1981 on my income taxes. That's all been taken care of, and I did pay my taxes back then, so there's no problem. The revenue department's happy with me right now, so it's all been resolved."

== In media ==
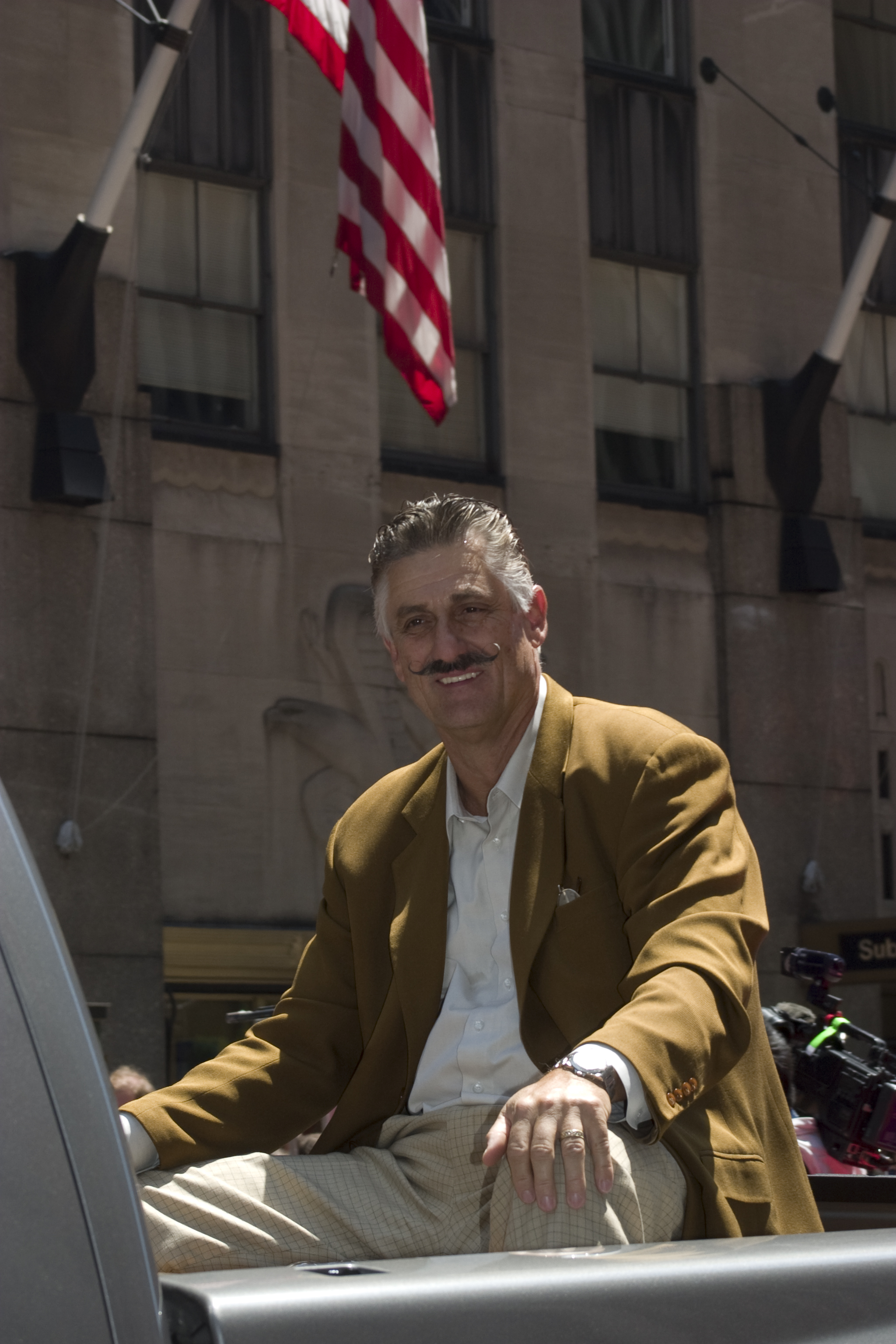
Fingers at the 2008 All-Star Game Red Carpet Parade

=== Books ===
On April 1, 2009, Rollie Fingers and co-author Christopher "Yellowstone" Ritter released:

- Rollie's Follies: A Hall of Fame Revue of Baseball Lists and Lore, Stats and Stories, Cincinnati, Ohio: Clerisy Press. ISBN 978-1-57860-335-0.

The work is a non-fiction baseball book that combines elements of humor, anecdotal storytelling, odd lists and historical trivia.

The first book inspired a sequel, released March 16, 2010, by Fingers and Ritter:

- The Rollie Fingers Baseball Bible: Lists and Lore, Stories and Stats, Cincinnati, Ohio: Clerisy Press. ISBN 978-1-57860-342-8.

=== Television appearances ===
Fingers and four other members of his family appeared on a 1983 episode of the game show Family Feud. After the opening theme, to honor Fingers, host Richard Dawson led the crowd in a chorus of "Take Me Out to the Ball Game". Fingers also appeared in a pair of commercials for Pepsi Max, playing himself in a Field of Dreams setting along with other legendary players. In one commercial, when the Pepsi Max delivery man replenishes an empty vending machine, Fingers appears to take his mustache off and give it to the delivery man, saying, "Great save, kid. You deserve this."

=== Radio ===
In 1994/1995 a comedy segment titled "Rollie TV", concerning a fictitious cable television channel devoted solely to the life of Rollie Fingers and helmed by a Fingers-obsessed host named Greg Shuttlecock, aired once a week on The Steve Dahl Radio Show on WMVP 1000 AM in Chicago. The idea and segment were created and performed by Jeffery C. Johnson and Jim Toth. A "Rollie TV" skit had originally aired in 1993 on Toth and Johnson's Chicago cable TV show Color TV and was then adapted into segments for radio.

== See also ==
- Bay Area Sports Hall of Fame
- List of Major League Baseball annual saves leaders
- List of Major League Baseball career games finished leaders

Achievements
Preceded by Hoyt Wilhelm	All-Time Saves Leader; 1980–1992	Succeeded by Jeff Reardon
Preceded by Ed Halicki	No-hit game September 28, 1975 (with Blue, Abbott & Lindblad)	Succeeded by Larry Dierker
