= Fimple =

Fimple is a surname. Notable people with the surname include:

- Dennis Fimple (1940–2002), American actor
- Jack Fimple (born 1959), American baseball player
