= Ghias Barakat =

Minister of Higher Education

Ghias A. Barakat
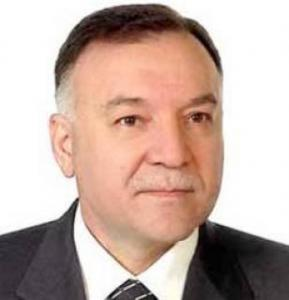
- Born: 23 September 1953 (age 73); Der Ezzor, Syria
- Education: Damascus University (B.A); University of Texas at Austin (M.A., Ph.D)
- Political party: Arab Socialist Ba'ath Party
- Spouse: Ahlam Barakat
- Children: Tamim Barakat

Ghias A. Barakat is a Syrian academic and a politician. He served as a member of the Arab Socialist Ba'ath Party central leadership from 2000 to 2005. He also served as head of Higher Education and Scientific Research Office under Bashar Al-Assad from 2006 to 2011.

Barakat was born in Deir ez-Zor on 23 September 1953. He was raised in Idlib and later moved to Damascus to continue his undergraduate education. In 1975, he obtained his B.A. in English Language and Literature from the University of Damascus and a Diploma of Education in 1977. In 1985, he obtained an MA and a PhD. in Applied Linguistics, with a specialty of Teaching English as a Foreign Language from University of Texas.

== Career ==
=== Political ===
Ghias A. Barakat started his political career as a Deputy Secretary of the Arab Ba'ath Socialist Party (University of Aleppo branch) between 1985 and up to 2000. He served, from 2000 to 2005, as a member of the Arab Baath Socialist Party Central leadership, head of Higher Education and Scientific Research Office under Bashar Al-Asad Presidency. He also served as a Minister of Higher Education and chairman of the Higher Education Council from 2006 to 2011. During his post as a minister, Barakat signed a number of academic agreements with Arab and foreign counterpart ministers. The most prominent agreements are the capacity building program an agreement with the British Council, cooperation agreement with South Africa, an agreement to the exchange of students and academics with Miguel Angel Moratinos, Spain minister of Foreign Affaires, and Memorandum of Understanding to enhance capacity building in the health sector with Aga Khan University (AKU) witnessed by his Highness the Aga Khan Imam (spiritual leader) of the Shia Ismaili Muslims and the Syrian prime minister Naji Al-Utri.

=== Achievements ===
During his services in the party and the ministry:

- Higher education witnessed a drastic reform aimed at upgrading the higher Education sector in Syria.
- Private universities were established for the first time.
- Branches and public universities were expanded all over the country and in almost every city to provide more admission opportunities for students. These resulted in accepting high percentage of female students in faculties in the cities they live in. Gross enrollment rates increased to a more than 70 per cent.
- Military students training subject was moved to training camps off campuses.
- Quality assurance and accreditation systems were established.
- The development of National Academic reference standards which aimed at the creation of human resource capacity in support of economic development.
- Serious attempts and actions taken to link the academic programs with societal and labor market needs.
- Polytechnic institutes also witnessed structural and academic changes in scope and in areas of specialty to meet the labor market needs.

=== Academic ===
In additional to his political posts Ghias A. Barakat has been a faculty member for over 35 years, an experience which covers a relatively significant part of his lifetime. He taught several undergraduate and graduate courses related to applied linguistics and was the director of the Advisory Center of English language program from 1985 to 2000, known now as The Higher Language Institute of Languages. He was an active member of TESOL (Teachers of English to Speakers of Other Languages) interest section. Barakat taught various courses mainly under Linguistics and Applied Linguistics on both the undergraduate and graduate levels. He also supervised a number of Master and Doctoral theses. Apart from that, he participated in linguistic studies conferences and symposia, local, regional and international. He involved with both Patrick Abram Seale the author of : "Asad of Syria: The Struggle for the Middle East", and later on with David W. Lesch the author of a unique and an extraordinary book: "The New Lion of Damascus: Bashar al-Asad and Modern Syria". In addition, he offered consultations for establishing and designing English as a Foreign language programs and digital dictionaries (Al-Mawrid) in the Arab World. Barakat headed Syrian Computer Society branch in Aleppo and served as a member of the Board of Trusties of the Syrian Computer Society in Damascus. In addition, he was a member of the legislative board of the teachers syndicate. He participated in Aleppo University international program in hosting and directing an educational and cultural program for enhancing intercultural relations with The National Council of US Arab-American Relations headed by Dr. John Duke Antony.

He is currently a full-time professor of Applied Linguistics at the Department of English, Faculty of Arts, Damascus University, Syria. He is also a consultant at Al-Andalus University for Medical Sciences.

== Books ==
Ghias A. Barakat published a number of books and research papers besides translating several books.

- 2018: Translated: Washington's Long War on Syria (حرب واشنطن الطويلة على سورية)
- 2016: Translated and edited: Political Discourse in the Media: Cross-Cultural Perspectives (الخطاب السياسي في وسائل الإعلام : منظورات عبر الثقافات)
- 2012: Contributor to a book entitled: A Grammar of Domari: Yaron Matras.
- 1999: Contributor to a book entitled: Applied Linguistics: Analytical Research. The Book addresses the efficacy of computer assisted language learning.
- 1997: Ed. & translated: Aleppo University Guide Book. Contributed to a book entitled Linguistics Applications Teaching English in Arabic Context, "Computer Assisted Instruction: Bases and Program", edited by Omar Sheikh Al-Shabab and Farida Baka.
