= Ted Simmons =

American baseball player and coach (born 1949)

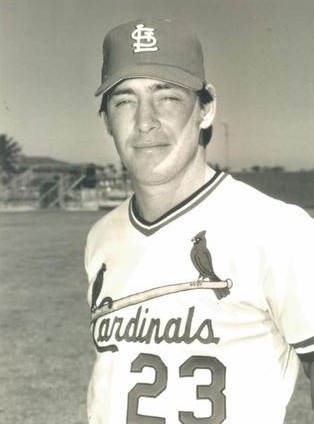
- Simmons with the St. Louis Cardinals in 1978
- Catcher
- Born: August 9, 1949 (age 77); Highland Park, Michigan, U.S.
- Batted: Switch Threw: Right

MLB debut
- September 21, 1968, for the St. Louis Cardinals

Last MLB appearance
- October 2, 1988, for the Atlanta Braves

MLB statistics
- Batting average: .285
- Hits: 2,472
- Home runs: 248
- Runs batted in: 1,389
- Stats at Baseball Reference

Teams
- St. Louis Cardinals (1968–1980); Milwaukee Brewers (1981–1985); Atlanta Braves (1986–1988)

Career highlights and awards
- 8× All-Star (1972–1974, 1977–1979, 1981, 1983); Silver Slugger Award (1980); St. Louis Cardinals No. 23 retired; St. Louis Cardinals Hall of Fame; Milwaukee Brewers Wall of Honor

Member of the National

Baseball Hall of Fame
- Induction: 2020
- Vote: 81.3%
- Election method: Modern Baseball Era Committee

Ted Lyle Simmons (born August 9, 1949), nicknamed "Simba", is an American former professional baseball catcher. He played 21 seasons in Major League Baseball (MLB) for the St. Louis Cardinals, Milwaukee Brewers, and Atlanta Braves. Although he was often overshadowed by his contemporary, Johnny Bench, Simmons is considered one of the best hitting catchers in MLB history. While his power numbers paled in comparison to Bench, Simmons still managed to hit for a higher batting average despite playing home games in a notoriously tough hitter's park.

At the time of his retirement, Simmons led all catchers in career hits and doubles and ranked second in RBIs behind Yogi Berra and second in total bases behind Carlton Fisk. He also retired with the National League record for home runs by a switch-hitter despite playing several years in the American League. Simmons hit .300 seven different times, hit 20 home runs six times, and caught 122 shutouts, eighth-most all-time. He was elected into the Baseball Hall of Fame in December 2019, and was formally enshrined in 2021. On July 31, 2021, he was honored by the Cardinals with the retirement of his jersey number (23) along with a statue.

== Playing career ==
Simmons attended Southfield High School in Southfield, Michigan, a suburb northwest of Detroit, and graduated in 1967. The St. Louis Cardinals selected Simmons in the first round, with the tenth overall selection, of the 1967 Major League Baseball draft. He received a $50,000 signing bonus from St. Louis to bypass his commitment to the University of Michigan. He made his professional debut in the Gulf Coast League, where he batted 7-for-20 (.350), before the Cardinals promoted him to the Cedar Rapids Cardinals of the Class A Midwest League. In 1968, he played for the Modesto Reds of the Class A California League, where he batted .331, with 28 home runs and 117 runs batted in (RBIs) in 136 games played.

Simmons made his major league debut with the Cardinals at the age of 18, appearing in two games during the 1968 pennant-winning season. Simmons spent another year in Triple-A with the Tulsa Oilers before returning to the major leagues in 1970 where he platooned with Joe Torre. In 1971, the Cardinals converted Torre into a third baseman and Simmons took over as their starting catcher, posting a .304 batting average with seven home runs and 77 RBIs. He finished 16th in balloting for the 1971 National League Most Valuable Player Award as the Cardinals finished in second place behind the Pittsburgh Pirates in the National League Eastern Division.

Simmons refused to sign a contract for the amount of salary offered by the Cardinals in 1972, electing to play without a contract. He ultimately signed a contract well into the season during which he was recognized as one of the top catchers in the league by earning a spot as a reserve on the 1972 National League All-Star team. He finished the year with a .303 batting average with 16 home runs and 96 RBIs, breaking Walker Cooper's team record for RBIs by a catcher and set the team record for home runs by a catcher, previously held jointly by Gene Oliver and Tim McCarver. His defense began to improve as well, posting a .991 fielding percentage and leading National League catchers in assists and in putouts. Despite the Cardinals finishing the season in fourth place, Simmons would finish in 10th place in the National League Most Valuable Player Award balloting. Simmons continued to produce offensively in 1973 with a .310 batting average, along with 13 home runs and 91 RBIs. He also led the league's catchers in putouts and finished second in assists, earning his second All-Star berth as the Cardinals again finished the season in second place.

In 1975, Simmons hit 18 home runs along with 100 RBIs and posted a career-high .332 batting average, finishing second in the National League batting championship behind Bill Madlock. He also set a National League single-season record for most hits by a catcher with 188. He finished in 6th place in the National League Most Valuable Player Award balloting as the Cardinals ended the season in fourth place. Simmons was the starting catcher for the National League in the 1978 All-Star Game when he replaced injured elected starter Johnny Bench. Simmons led the Cardinals in RBIs every year from 1972 until 1978. In 1979, Simmons hit a career-high 26 home runs, setting the record for most home runs in a season by a Cardinals catcher. He was elected to be the starting catcher for the National League All-Star team, but he was unable to play due to a broken wrist, and was replaced in the starting lineup by Bob Boone of the Phillies. He had another strong year in 1980, hitting .303 with 21 home runs and 98 RBIs to win the inaugural Silver Slugger Award which is awarded annually to the best offensive player at each position.

By the late-1970s, Simmons was throwing out less than one-third of potential basestealers. During the 1980 season, Cardinals manager Whitey Herzog wanted Simmons moved to first base and Keith Hernandez to left field for the first six innings, with the latter often reverting to his original position at the end of games. Simmons' refusal and the ensuing feud with Herzog led to him being traded along with Rollie Fingers and Pete Vuckovich to the Milwaukee Brewers for Sixto Lezcano, Lary Sorensen, Dave LaPoint and David Green at the 1980 Winter Meetings on December 12. His batting average fell to .216 in his first season in the American League but, he rebounded in 1982 with a .269 batting average with 23 home runs and 97 RBIs and led American League catchers with a .995 fielding percentage in 121 games. The Brewers clinched the American League Eastern Division title, then defeated the California Angels in the 1982 American League Championship Series. Simmons met his old team, the St. Louis Cardinals in the 1982 World Series, hitting two home runs before the Brewers lost in a seven-game series. Simmons had one more good year in 1983 when he hit for a .308 batting average with 13 home runs and 108 RBIs and earned his eighth and final All-Star berth. His batting average fell to .221 in 1984, although Simmons rebounded in 1985 with a .273 average and 76 RBIs, and in March 1986 he was traded to the Atlanta Braves. He spent three seasons with the Braves as a utility player and pinch hitter before retiring as a player in 1988 at the age of 38. From an equipment standpoint, Simmons used a Rawlings brand catcher's mitt and Adirondack bats.

== Career statistics ==
Ted Simmons's number 23 was retired by the St. Louis Cardinals in 2021.

In a 21-year major league career, Simmons played in 2,456 games, accumulating 2,472 hits in 8,680 at bats for a .285 career batting average along with 248 home runs, 1,389 runs batted in and a .348 on-base percentage. He ended his career with a .986 fielding percentage. An eight-time All-Star, he batted above .300 seven times, reached 20 home runs six times, and eight times exceeded 90 runs batted in. He switch-hit home runs in a game three times and established a since-broken National League career record for home runs by a switch-hitter (182). Simmons held major league records for catchers with 2,472 career hits and 483 doubles, since broken by Iván Rodríguez. He ranks second all-time among catchers with 1,389 runs batted in and 10th with 248 home runs. He caught 122 shutouts in his career, ranking him eighth all-time among major league catchers. In his book, The Bill James Historical Baseball Abstract, baseball historian Bill James ranked Simmons 10th all-time among major league catchers.

== Highlights ==
- 8-time All-Star (1972–1974, 1977–1979, 1981, 1983)
- Silver Slugger Award (1980)
- 7-times hit .300 or more (1971–1973, 1975, 1977, 1980, 1983)
- Caught two no-hitters as a Cardinal: Bob Gibson in 1971; the first of Bob Forsch's two career no-hitters in 1978.
- Twice led the National League in intentional walks (1976–1977). He ranks 15th in the All-Time list with 188.
- Most career intentional bases on balls (188) by a player who was primarily a catcher

== Baseball executive and coaching career ==
In 1992, Simmons was hired as general manager of the Pittsburgh Pirates. He served in that position for only a year, retiring after suffering a heart attack in June 1993. He also was director of player development for both the Cardinals and San Diego Padres, and a scout at the Major League level for the Cleveland Indians. He was named the bench coach for the Milwaukee Brewers starting with the 2008 season. On September 15, 2008, he was reassigned to another position within the organization.

In November 2008 Simmons was named bench coach for the Padres under manager Bud Black, replacing Craig Colbert. He was hired on November 5, 2010 as a senior advisor to general manager Jack Zduriencik of the Seattle Mariners. Simmons rejoined the Braves in October 2015, as a scout.

== Hall of Fame candidacy ==
Simmons first became eligible for election to the Baseball Hall of Fame in 1994, but received less than 5% of the vote on his first ballot, thus becoming ineligible for future election by the Baseball Writers' Association of America. In December 2017, he missed being elected to the Hall of Fame via the Veterans Committee by one vote, but was elected in December 2019 for the Class of 2020. He was formally enshrined on September 8, 2021, as the 2020 ceremony was postponed because of the coronavirus pandemic.

== See also ==
- 1982 World Series
- List of Major League Baseball career hits leaders
- List of Silver Slugger Award winners at catcher
- List of Major League Baseball career home run leaders
- List of Major League Baseball career doubles leaders
- List of Major League Baseball career runs scored leaders
- List of Major League Baseball career runs batted in leaders
- List of St. Louis Cardinals team records
