= Bobby Mitchell (1980s outfielder) =

American baseball player (born 1955)

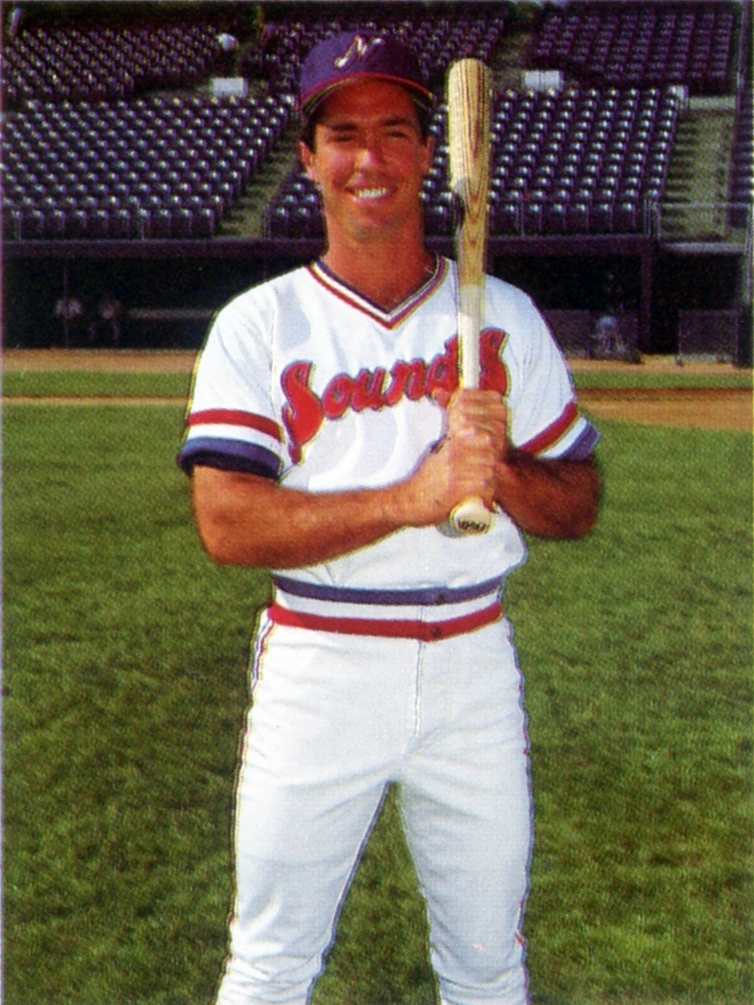
- Mitchell with the Nashville Sounds in 1985
- Outfielder
- Born: April 7, 1955 (age 71); Salt Lake City, Utah, U.S.
- Batted: Left Threw: Left

MLB debut
- September 1, 1980, for the Los Angeles Dodgers

Last MLB appearance
- September 21, 1983, for the Minnesota Twins

MLB statistics
- Batting average: .243
- Home runs: 3
- Runs batted in: 43
- Stats at Baseball Reference

Teams
- Los Angeles Dodgers (1980–1981); Minnesota Twins (1982–1983)

Robert Van Mitchell (born April 7, 1955) is an American former outfielder in Major League Baseball who played from 1980 to 1983 with the Los Angeles Dodgers and Minnesota Twins.

Mitchell played in the 1967 Little League World Series for Northridge, California Little League. He then played in the 1974 College World Series with the USC Trojans. He played on the 1981 Dodgers team that won the World Series but was not on the postseason roster.

Mitchell was drafted but the San Francisco Giants out of high school in the 1973 MLB draft but chose to attend college. The Dodgers drafted him in the seventh round of the 1977 MLB draft. After limited appearances with the Dodgers in 1980 and 1981, Los Angeles traded Mitchell and Bobby Castillo to the Twins in January 1982.

After his playing days, Mitchell was a minor league coach from 1992 to 2005 for minor league affiliates of the Montreal Expos, San Diego Padres, Chicago Cubs, and Anaheim Angels and a roving outfield and baserunning instructor in the farm system of the Boston Red Sox.

In 2006, Mitchell became the manager of the Rancho Cucamonga Quakes in the Angels system, and in 2008 he was promoted to skipper of the Triple-A Salt Lake Bees of the Pacific Coast League. In 2015, he was named roving minor league outfield and baserunning coach for the Atlanta Braves. In 2016 he joined the New York Yankees' system as manager of the Double-A Trenton Thunder and was rehired for 2017 after leading his 2016 club to 87 wins and the Eastern League playoffs. On January 31, 2018, Mitchell was named the manager of the Scranton/Wilkes-Barre RailRiders. In nine years as a minor league pilot, Mitchell has compiled a 517–460 (.529) win–loss record.

Mitchell's father, Robert, was a coach on Mitchell's 1967 Little League World Series team. His father received college football scholarships from the Florida Gators and Oklahoma Sooners.
