= Joe Beckwith =

American baseball player (1955–2021)

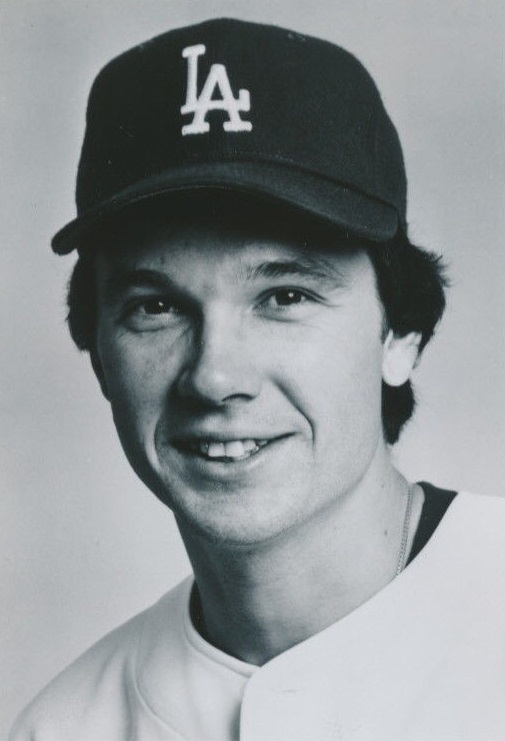
- Beckwith in 1979
- Pitcher
- Born: January 28, 1955; Opelika, Alabama, U.S.
- Died: May 22, 2021 (aged 66); Auburn, Alabama, U.S.
- Batted: Left Threw: Right

MLB debut
- July 21, 1979, for the Los Angeles Dodgers

Last MLB appearance
- September 30, 1986, for the Los Angeles Dodgers

MLB statistics
- Win–loss record: 18–19
- Earned run average: 3.54
- Strikeouts: 319
- Stats at Baseball Reference

Teams
- Los Angeles Dodgers (1979–1980, 1982–1983); Kansas City Royals (1984–1985); Los Angeles Dodgers (1986)

Career highlights and awards
- World Series champion (1985)

Thomas Joseph Beckwith (January 28, 1955 – May 22, 2021) was an American baseball pitcher who played seven seasons in Major League Baseball (MLB). He played for the Los Angeles Dodgers and Kansas City Royals from 1979 to 1986. He threw right-handed and served primarily as a relief pitcher.

Beckwith was drafted by the Los Angeles Dodgers in 1977 and played for two of their minor league affiliates until 1979, when the Dodgers promoted him to the major leagues. After spending three more seasons with the organization, he was traded to Kansas City. The Royals won the World Series in 1985, and he was released before the start of the following season. He returned to the Dodgers in 1986 and played his last game on September 30 that year.

== Early life ==
Beckwith was born in Opelika, Alabama, on January 28, 1955. His father, Bill, worked at the Auburn University in public relations and as director of ticket sales over four decades; his mother was Marjorie. He was raised in Auburn, Alabama, and attended Auburn High School, where he played for the school team, and also served as batboy for Auburn University. He went on to study at the university, playing for the Auburn Tigers from 1974 to 1977. In 1975 he played collegiate summer baseball with the Cotuit Kettleers of the Cape Cod Baseball League and was named a league all-star.

Beckwith pitched a no-hitter against the University of Houston at the beginning of the 1976 season. He set the record at the time for most career wins (31) with the Tigers and in the Southeastern Conference (SEC). Other team records he established that remained standing at the time of his death include most complete games in a season (10) and in a career (20), as well as most shutouts all-time (6) and in a single season (3). He was named to the All-SEC team in 1976 and 1977. Beckwith was initially drafted by the Cleveland Indians in the 12th round of the 1976 Major League Baseball draft, but opted not to sign. He was subsequently drafted by the Los Angeles Dodgers in the second round of the following year's draft.

== Career ==
Beckwith played three seasons in the minor leagues from 1977 to 1979. He made his MLB debut on July 21, 1979, at the age of 24, relieving Don Sutton and giving up two earned runs and striking out one over 2 innings in a 7–2 loss to the Montreal Expos. He finished his rookie season in 1980 with a 3–3 win–loss record, a 1.96 earned run average (ERA), and 40 strikeouts over 59 2/3 innings pitched. (Note: Though Beckwith debuted with the Dodgers in 1979, he qualified as a rookie in 1980, as he had fewer than 50 innings pitched during the 1979 season.)

Beckwith suffered double vision in 1981, sidelining him the entire season in which the Dodgers won the World Series. He sustained the injury in spring training while pitching batting practice without a screen in front to shield him. Jack Perconte hit a pitch back at him. Beckwith quickly ducked and avoided being hit as the ball flew by his head. He thought he had avoided a serious injury, but the double vision manifested itself in the following days. Beckwith underwent two surgeries to restore the balance in his eyes, and he returned to the Dodgers in mid-1982.

Beckwith won the 1985 World Series with the Royals. He pitched two innings in his lone appearance in Game 4, and was one of only two relief pitchers the Royals used during the series (the other being closer Dan Quisenberry). Beckwith was subsequently released by the organization on March 28 of the following year. After signing with the Toronto Blue Jays but failing to make their major league roster, he rejoined the Dodgers on July 31, 1986. He played his final major league game on September 30 that same year, at the age of 31.

== Later life ==
After retiring from baseball, Beckwith lived in Atlanta for several years before returning to Auburn. He worked in the concrete industry with Ready Mix USA/CEMEX. He also coached local youth baseball and softball. He managed the Alabama Dixie Youth team that won the state championship in 2004. That same year, Beckwith was inducted into the Alabama Sports Hall of Fame, becoming the first graduate of Auburn High to be enshrined there. He was subsequently honored in Auburn's Tiger Trail Walk of Fame in 2006.

Beckwith died on May 22, 2021. He was 66, and suffered from colon cancer in the two-and-a-half years leading up to his death.

== See also ==
- List of Auburn University people
