= Jeff Little =

American baseball player (born 1954)

- Pitcher
- Born: December 25, 1954 (age 71); Fremont, Ohio, U.S.
- Batted: Right Threw: Left

MLB debut
- September 6, 1980, for the St. Louis Cardinals

Last MLB appearance
- October 3, 1982, for the Minnesota Twins

MLB statistics
- Win–loss record: 3–1
- Earned run average: 4.09
- Strikeouts: 43
- Stats at Baseball Reference

Teams
- St. Louis Cardinals (1980); Minnesota Twins (1982)

Donald Jeffrey Little (born December 25, 1954) is an American former Major League Baseball pitcher. Little played in two seasons: 1980 for the St. Louis Cardinals and 1982 for the Minnesota Twins. He pitched in a total of 40 games, including two starts.
