= Gary Weiss (baseball) =

American baseball player (born 1955)

- Shortstop
- Born: December 27, 1955 (age 70); Brenham, Texas, U.S.
- Batted: Switch Threw: Right

MLB debut
- September 13, 1980, for the Los Angeles Dodgers

Last MLB appearance
- October 4, 1981, for the Los Angeles Dodgers

MLB statistics
- Batting average: .105
- Home runs: 0
- Runs batted in: 1
- Stats at Baseball Reference

Teams
- Los Angeles Dodgers (1980–1981)

Gary Lee Weiss (born December 27, 1955) is an American former shortstop in Major League Baseball who played for the Los Angeles Dodgers from 1980-1981.

Weiss was selected by the Dodgers in the 19th round of the 1978 Major League Baseball draft from the University of Houston. He made his Major League debut on September 13, 1980 in a game against the Cincinnati Reds. In his debut season, he was used as a pinch runner in all eight games in which he appeared. Weiss appeared in 14 games in his second season in 1981, recording two hits.
