= Rick Sutcliffe =

American baseball player and broadcaster (born 1956)

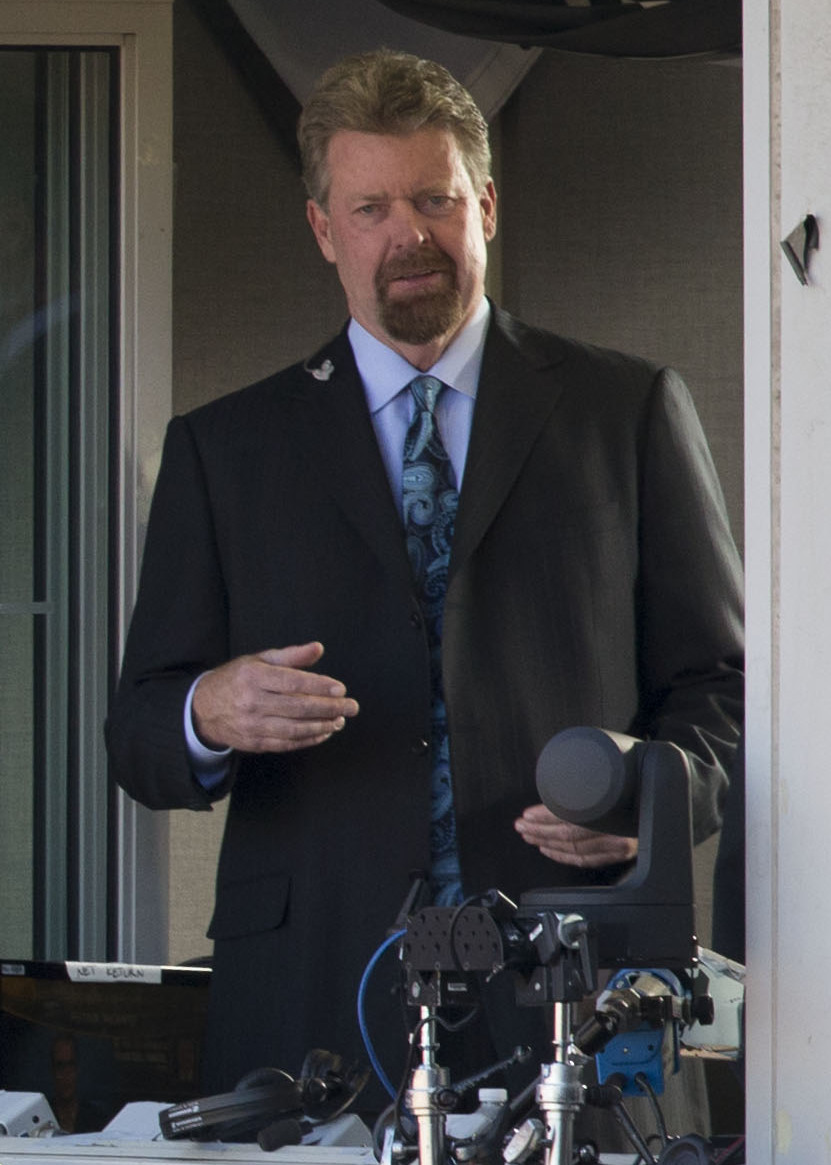
- Sutcliffe in 2014
- Pitcher
- Born: June 21, 1956 (age 70); Independence, Missouri, U.S.
- Batted: Left Threw: Right

MLB debut
- September 29, 1976, for the Los Angeles Dodgers

Last MLB appearance
- July 22, 1994, for the St. Louis Cardinals

MLB statistics
- Win–loss record: 171–139
- Earned run average: 4.08
- Strikeouts: 1,679
- Stats at Baseball Reference

Teams
- Los Angeles Dodgers (1976, 1978–1981); Cleveland Indians (1982–1984); Chicago Cubs (1984–1991); Baltimore Orioles (1992–1993); St. Louis Cardinals (1994)

Career highlights and awards
- 3× All-Star (1983, 1987, 1989); NL Cy Young Award (1984); NL Rookie of the Year (1979); Roberto Clemente Award (1987); NL wins leader (1987); AL ERA leader (1982); Chicago Cubs Hall of Fame

Richard Lee Sutcliffe (born June 21, 1956), nicknamed "the Red Baron", is an American former Major League Baseball pitcher with the Los Angeles Dodgers, Cleveland Indians, Chicago Cubs, Baltimore Orioles, and St. Louis Cardinals between 1976 and 1994. Sutcliffe is currently a broadcaster for ESPN and Marquee Sports Network.

A right-hander, Sutcliffe was a three-time All-Star. He won the National League Rookie of the Year award in 1979 and the National League Cy Young Award in 1984.

== Early life ==
Richard Lee Sutcliffe was born on June 21, 1956, in Independence, Missouri. Sutcliffe attended Van Horn High School, where he received All-American honors as an infielder.

== Professional career ==
=== Draft and minor leagues ===
Sutcliffe was the 21st pick in 1974 amateur draft by the Los Angeles Dodgers.

=== Los Angeles Dodgers (1976, 1978–1981) ===
Sutcliffe's first full season in the majors was 1979. He won 17 games for the Dodgers and was the first of four consecutive Rookies of the Year for the Dodgers from 1979–1982 (Steve Howe, Fernando Valenzuela, and Steve Sax were the others). Sutcliffe had a rough 1980 for the team; near the end of the season, he was told by Pete Rose that he'd been tipping his pitches. Sutcliffe improved in 1981, a year in which the Dodgers went on to win the World Series. Although Sutcliffe did not appear on the Dodgers' roster for their 1981 World Series championship run, he was awarded a World Series ring by the team. Sutcliffe, angry at Dodgers' manager Tommy Lasorda, whom he accused of lying to him, publicly demanded a trade. (Years later, the two reconciled.)

=== Cleveland Indians (1982–1984) ===
After the season, Sutcliffe was traded, along with Jack Perconte, to the Cleveland Indians for journeyman outfielder Jorge Orta, plus Jack Fimple and Larry White.

Sutcliffe won 31 games over the course of the next two seasons for Cleveland and led the American League in earned run average in 1982.

=== Chicago Cubs (1984–1991) ===
1987 card of Sutcliffe

In mid-1984, Cleveland traded a struggling Sutcliffe to the Chicago Cubs for Mel Hall and Joe Carter. Sutcliffe rebounded and won 16 games for the Cubs while losing only one, helping them to the division championship. On October 2, 1984, he started the first game of the NLCS against the San Diego Padres, giving up two hits and no runs, not only gaining the victory, but also hitting a home run in the third inning. Five days later, Sutcliffe pitched the final game of the series at Jack Murphy Stadium, but posted the loss after giving up four runs in the seventh inning.

Sutcliffe won the Cy Young Award with a unanimous vote, beating out Dwight Gooden and Bruce Sutter. He also finished fourth in the league MVP voting. When he re-signed with the Cubs as a free agent the following year, his contract briefly made him the highest-paid pitcher in baseball.

Sutcliffe started the 1985 season strong, going 5–3 in his first eight starts, including two complete-game shutouts. A hamstring pull on May 19 limited his starts for the year, followed by a series of arm injuries which would limit Sutcliffe's effectiveness over the next two seasons. In 1987, he bounced back to win 18 games and finished second in the league's Cy Young voting to Steve Bedrosian despite playing for a last-place Cubs team which also featured National League Most Valuable Player Andre Dawson. He also was presented 1987's Roberto Clemente Award, given annually to a Major League player who demonstrates sportsmanship and community involvement.

On July 29, 1988, in Philadelphia, Sutcliffe achieved one of baseball's rarest feats, especially for a pitcher, by stealing home plate during an 8–3 win over the Phillies, in which he also notched the victory. In 1989, Sutcliffe won 16 games and made his final All-Star appearance, where he was managed once again by Tommy Lasorda. He also helped the Cubs to another division title, but the Cubs lost to the San Francisco Giants in the playoffs.

Recurring arm injuries caused Sutcliffe to miss most of the 1990 and 1991 seasons and the Cubs did not offer him a contract for the next season.

=== Baltimore Orioles (1992–1993) ===
Signing with the Baltimore Orioles, Sutcliffe went 16–15 and 10–10 in 1992 and 1993, starting the first game at Oriole Park at Camden Yards.

=== St. Louis Cardinals (1994) ===
He ended his career by signing a one-year minor league contract with the St. Louis Cardinals in 1994, going 6–4 in an injury-plagued season. He retired with a career record of 171–139, with an ERA of 4.08. He holds the unique distinction of having won each of the following league awards, once each, and each in a different season: Rookie of the Year (1979), Cy Young Award (1984), ERA leader (1982), and wins leader (1987). Sutcliffe also has the distinction of being the pitcher who faced all-time MLB home run leader Barry Bonds the most times without giving up a home run once, with 51 plate appearances between the two.

=== Non-pitching statistics ===
As a hitter, Sutcliffe was above average for a pitcher. He posted a .181 batting average (102-for-562) with 42 runs, 4 home runs, 55 RBI, 4 stolen bases and 34 bases on balls. He had a career-high 17 RBI in 1979 as a member of the Dodgers. In eight postseason games, he hit .500 (4-for-8) with 1 run, 1 double, 1 home run and 1 RBI.

Defensively, he was above average, recording a .973 fielding percentage which was 19 points higher than the league average at his position.

== Broadcasting career ==
After his retirement from baseball, Sutcliffe was the pitching coach for the Idaho Falls Braves (a farm team of the Padres) in 1996 and 1997. After his coaching stint in Idaho Falls, Sutcliffe became a color commentator for the Padres on Channel 4 San Diego from 1998 to 2004.

Sutcliffe has served as an analyst for ESPN since 1998, when he served as a guest analyst for ESPN Radio’s coverage of that seasons MLB playoffs. He joined the network full-time in March 1999 and has appeared on Wednesday Night Baseball since 2002. ESPN announced that they had signed a multi-year extension with Sutcliffe in late 2018; he continues to be the lead analyst for their Wednesday Night Baseball coverage. Sutcliffe has also provided commentary for international coverage of the World Series via DirecTV/MLB International (1997–2002 and since 2010).

On March 13, 2008, Sutcliffe was diagnosed with "curable and maintainable" colon cancer. He underwent chemotherapy and radiation therapy in his hometown of Kansas City during the spring of 2008 and returned to work with ESPN on May 21, 2008. He also is a motivational speaker for the Fellowship of Christian Athletes.

== Personal life ==
Sutcliffe is married to Robin (née Ross). The couple wed in February 1978.
