= Joe DeSa =

American baseball player (1959–1986)

- First baseman
- Born: July 27, 1959; Honolulu, Hawaii, U.S.
- Died: December 20, 1986 (aged 27); Cayey, Puerto Rico
- Batted: Left Threw: Left

MLB debut
- September 6, 1980, for the St. Louis Cardinals

Last MLB appearance
- October 3, 1985, for the Chicago White Sox

MLB statistics
- Batting average: .200
- Home runs: 2
- Runs batted in: 7
- Stats at Baseball Reference

Teams
- St. Louis Cardinals (1980); Chicago White Sox (1985)

Joseph DeSa (July 27, 1959 – December 20, 1986) was an American Major League Baseball first baseman.

Drafted by the St. Louis Cardinals in the third round of the 1977 MLB amateur draft, DeSa made his Major League Baseball debut with the St. Louis Cardinals on September 6, 1980, and appeared in his final game on October 3, 1985, for the Chicago White Sox.

== Pro career ==
Joe DeSa was drafted by the St Louis Cardinals in 1977 out of Damien high school in the amateur draft. DeSa was assigned to the Cardinals minor league affiliate in the Pioneer league, the Calgary Cardinals. At only 17, DeSa was the starting first baseman for Calgary, appearing in 70 games. The following season, DeSa was promoted from the rookie league to the Cardinals single-A affiliate, the St. Petersburg Cardinals. Desa split time with another Cardinals prospect, Kelly Paris, and the team was managed by Hal Lanier. That season in St. Petersburg, Desa had a batting average of .310 Also, during that season, both Paris and DeSa spent time with the Cardinals other single-A affiliate, the Gastonia Cardinals In 1979, DeSa was moving up the chain again, this time to the Cardinals Double-A affiliate the Arkansas Travelers. Much like his previous stops, DeSa again was entrenched as the starter at first base, appearing in 126 games for Arkansas and batting .317.

In 1980, DeSa made it to Triple-A, playing for the Springfield Redbirds and again was reunited with Lanier, who had managed DeSa in St. Petersburg. DeSa again started at first base and batted .293.

In 1980, DeSa finally made it to the major leagues, appearing in seven games as a utility infielder. DeSa spent the 1981, 1982, and 1983 seasons all at Triple A. In 1984, Desa signed with the Chicago White Sox as a free agent, and was assigned to their triple-A team the Denver Zephyrs. The next season, Chicago switched affiliates, going with the Buffalo Bisons in 1985. During that season, DeSa was recalled by Chicago, and appeared in several games for the White Sox DeSa appeared in his final major league game, a 5–4 loss to the Seattle Mariners

== Death ==
DeSa died in an automobile accident in the early morning hours of December 20, 1986 in Cayey, Puerto Rico. At the time of his death, he was playing in the Puerto Rico Professional Baseball League for the Ponce Lions.

== See also ==
- List of baseball players who died during their careers
