= Jack Fimple =

American baseball player (born 1959)

- Catcher
- Born: February 10, 1959 (age 67); Darby, Pennsylvania, U.S.
- Batted: Right Threw: Right

MLB debut
- July 30, 1983, for the Los Angeles Dodgers

Last MLB appearance
- October 4, 1987, for the California Angels

MLB statistics
- Batting average: .228
- Home runs: 2
- Runs batted in: 28
- Stats at Baseball Reference

Teams
- Los Angeles Dodgers (1983–1984, 1986); California Angels (1987)

John Joseph Fimple (born February 10, 1959) is an American former professional baseball catcher. He played in Major League Baseball (MLB) for the Los Angeles Dodgers and California Angels.

Drafted by the Cleveland Indians in the 29th round of the 1980 Major League Baseball draft, Fimple made his MLB debut with the Dodgers on July 30, 1983, and appeared in his final game on October 4, 1987. He attended college at Humboldt State University.

== Amateur career ==
Fimple attended Montgomery High School in Santa Rosa, California, but quit the school's baseball team after an argument with the coach. After high school, he enlisted in the United States Coast Guard. While in the Coast Guard in 1979, he attended an open tryout for the semi-pro Humboldt Crabs. His performance with the Crabs earned him an invitation to play college baseball at Humboldt State where he played for one season before he was drafted by the Cleveland Indians in the 29th round of the 1980 MLB draft.

== Pro career ==
Fimple made his pro debut for the Batavia Trojans of the New York-Penn League. Despite having future major league stars like Kelly Gruber and Dave Gallagher, the Trojans finished the season 30-43. The next season Fimple played for the Waterloo Indians of the Midwest League. During that season Fimple was the team's primary catcher. He batted .288 with 10 home runs and 21 doubles, showing speed not often found in a catcher. In December 1981, the Indians traded Fimple along with pitcher Larry White and Outfielder Jorge Orta to the Los Angeles Dodgers for second baseman Jack Perconte and starting pitcher Rick Sutcliffe.

In his first year in the Dodgers system, Fimple was assigned to play for their single A club, the Vero Beach Dodgers. Fimple batted .281 with nine home runs and 14 doubles. Fimple even register one stolen base. The next season Fimple would make the leap from single-A ball to playing for the Dodgers Triple-A squad in Albuquerque. Fimple once again was the primary catcher; among the pitchers he caught were John Franco, Brian Holton, and Orel Hershiser. On July 30, 1983, Jack Fimple made his MLB debut at the age of 24. He got one at bat as a late inning defensive replacement for Steve Yeager in an 8-0 loss versus the San Francisco Giants. Fimple would play in both games of the double header the next day, and got his first major league hit, a single to left field off Giants starter Fred Breining. Over all in his first season in the majors, Fimple played in 54 games, batted .250, and had 37 hits in 167 at-bats, including two home runs.

In 1984, Fimple split time between the Dodgers and their triple A team in Albuquerque. He struggled at the plate batting only .249 in triple A. However, that wasn't the worst part of the year for Fimple. At the conclusion of the 1984 season, Fimple underwent surgery for repair damage he suffered to his ulnar nerve in his elbow. The hope was that he would be ready to play once spring training rolled around in 1985.

Fimple spent the entire season in 1985 in Triple-A Albuquerque. He split time with Gilberto Reyes behind the plate, and his hitting had continued to be a struggle. In 72 games, Fimple batted a mere .229 for the season. Despite his struggles, Fimple was almost part of a major trade. The trade would have sent Fimple, power hitting prospect Ralph Bryant, along with pitchers Bob Welch and Tom Niedenfuer to the Philadelphia Phillies for star third baseman Mike Schmidt. However, the Dodgers refused to part with Bryant, who ended up being a bust, so the trade never happened. He played in a handful of games for the Dodgers again in 1986, splitting time between the majors and triple A. At the end of the season, the Dodgers gave Fimple his unconditional release. The California Angels signed Fimple as a free agent in 1987 and assigned him to their Triple-A club, the Edmonton Trappers. While Fimple played in a handful of games for the Angels that season, serving as a backup to Bob Boone and Butch Wynegar, he continued to struggle to find his old form. As spring training broke in 1988, Fimple, along with outfielder Mark Ryal were placed on waivers by the Angels. This brought an end to Fimple's baseball career.
