= Andy Rincon =

American baseball player (1959–2023)

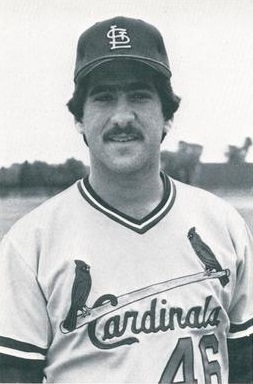
- Pitcher
- Born: March 5, 1959; Monterey Park, California, U.S.
- Died: August 28, 2023 (aged 64); Whittier, California, U.S.
- Batted: Right Threw: Right

MLB debut
- September 15, 1980, for the St. Louis Cardinals

Last MLB appearance
- May 22, 1982, for the St. Louis Cardinals

MLB statistics
- Win–loss record: 8–5
- Strikeouts: 46
- Earned run average: 3.12
- Stats at Baseball Reference

Teams
- St. Louis Cardinals (1980–1982)

Andrew John Rincon (March 5, 1959 – August 28, 2023) was an American former Major League Baseball pitcher from Monterey Park, California. A multi-sport athlete in high school, Rincon was a two-time All-CIF baseball player and was the 1977 CIF Southern Section Player of the Year in baseball at St. Paul High School in Santa Fe Springs California, where he played alongside future MLB player and coach Mike Gallego. He was drafted by the St. Louis Cardinals in the 5th round of the 1977 Major League Baseball draft. He was a "September Call-up" in 1980. He started four games, going 3–1 with a 2.61 ERA. This earned him another brief look the next year, when he had a similar 3–1 record, this time with a 1.77 ERA in five starts. That season, he was hit in his pitching arm by a line drive by Phil Garner, thus hampering his career. In 1982, Rincon started six games and relieved in five games, finishing with a 2–3 record and 4.73 ERA for a Cardinals team that would go on to win the World Series. His final MLB appearance was on May 22, 1982. He finished the 1982 season with the Cardinals' AAA affiliate, the Louisville Redbirds. In 1983, he went 1-2 with a 4.65 ERA in 6 appearances for the Redbirds. The Cardinals released him at the end of 1983. The San Diego Padres signed him that offseason, but he never pitched in the majors again. He continued to pitch in the minor leagues, compiling a 50-55 record with a 4.04 ERA in 172 appearances from 1977 to 1989, playing for the Calgary Cardinals, Gastonia Cardinals, St. Petersburg Cardinals, Arkansas Travelers, Springfield Redbirds, Louisville Redbirds, Nashua Pirates, Hawaii Islanders, Aguascalientes Rieleros and Fresno Suns. He threw a no-hitter for the Islanders in 1984. In his final professional season in 1989, Rincon went 1-0 in 11 relief appearances for the Arkansas Travelers.

Rincon died on August 28, 2023.
