= David W. Lesch =

Lecturer and commentator on Middle East politics

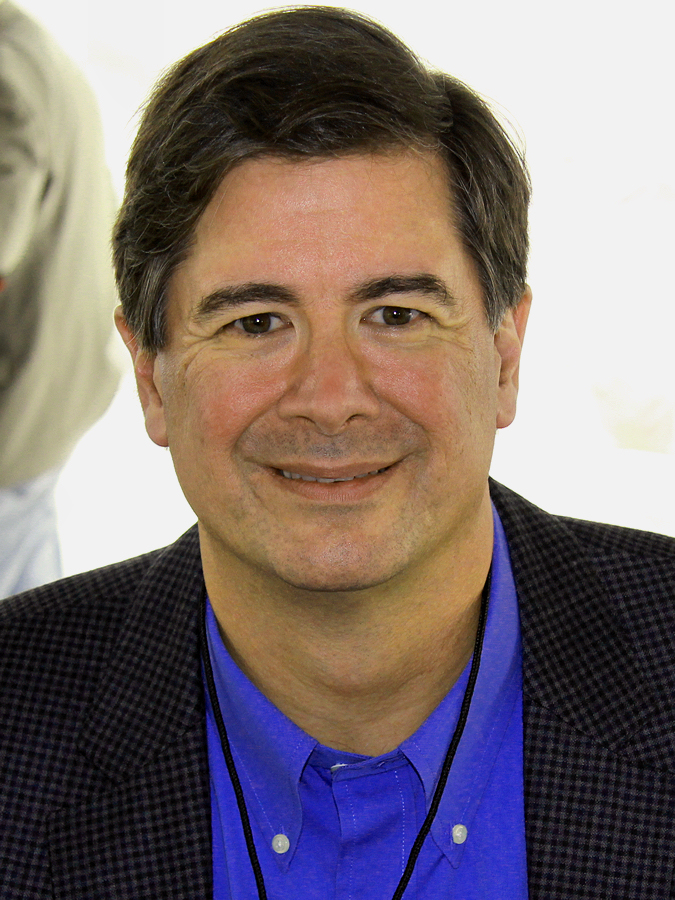
David W. Lesch at the 2012 Texas Book Festival.

David Warren Lesch is a lecturer, author and commentator on Middle East history and politics. He is the Ewing Halsell Distinguished Professor of Middle East History at Trinity University in San Antonio, Texas. Lesch writes regularly for news publications and journals and has made frequent appearances on radio and television to discuss Middle East politics, with a particular focus on Syria. In 2012–2013, he co-founded, organized, and led the Harvard-NUPI-Trinity Syria Research Project alongside William Ury. The project was funded by the governments of Norway and Switzerland, and its Final Report was published by NUPI in 2013. He co-founded what in essence is the 2nd phase of this project in early 2014, along with Gerard McHugh, the founder and president of Conflict Dynamics International (CDI), based in Cambridge, MA. This 2nd phase is entitled the CDI-Trinity University Syria Initiative, and it is ongoing and funded by the government of Denmark. Both Syria projects have attempted to offer a better multi-dimensional understanding of the Syrian civil war as well as chart out possible pathways toward conflict resolution and sustainable governance.

== Education ==
Lesch earned his Bachelor of Arts degree from the University of Maryland, Baltimore County and his M.A. and Ph.D. in History and Middle Eastern Studies from Harvard University.

== Books ==
- Syria and the United States: Eisenhower's Cold War in the Middle East (Westview Press, 1992)
- 1979: The Year that Shaped the Modern Middle East (Westview Press, 2001)
- History in Dispute: The Middle East Since 1945, Volumes 14 and 15 (St. James Press, 2003)
- The Middle East and the United States: A Historical and Political Reassessment (editor, Westview Press, 1996, 1999, 2003, 4th edition, 2006)
- The New Lion of Damascus: Bashar al-Asad and Modern Syria (Yale University Press, 2005)
- The Arab-Israeli Conflict: A History With Documents (Oxford University Press, 2006, 2nd edition 2019)
- Syrian Foreign Policy and the United States: From Bush to Obama (co-author) (Lynne Rienner Publishers, 2009)
- The Middle East and the United States: History, Politics and Ideology (co-editor with Mark Haas) (Westview Press, 2011, 2013, Routledge, 2018)
- Syria: The Fall of the House of Assad (Yale University Press, 2012, updated and in paperback 2013)
- Historical Dictionary of Syria (co-author with David Commins) (Scarecrow Press, 2012)
- "The Arab Spring: Change and Resistance in the Middle East (Volume 1, Westview Press, 2013) co-editor with Mark Haas
- "The Arab Spring: The Hope and Reality of the Uprisings (Volume 2, Routledge, 2017) co-editor with Mark Haas
- "Syria: A Modern History" (Polity Press, 2019)
- "A History of the Middle East Since the Rise of Islam (Oxford University Press, 2023)

== Public Profile ==
Lesch has been asked to appear and discuss Syria and the Middle East on several US radio and television programs, including CNN, MSNBC and CNBC. He has also had opinion pieces in The Financial Times, The New York Times and The Washington Post, among others.

He has travelled frequently to the Middle East on academic, business and diplomatic missions, and was president of Middle East International Business Associates, Inc., a consulting firm that investigated business opportunities in the Middle East for US companies.

In 2004 David Lesch began having regular contact with personal friend Syrian President Bashar al-Assad, and has since consulted with US government officials in their attempts to improve relations between the US and Syria.

In May 2008, Dr. Lesch was recognized by Trinity for his outstanding research.

=== Baseball career ===
Lesch was also the number one draft pick of the Los Angeles Dodgers in the January 1980 draft out of Central Arizona College as a pitcher. He pitched in only five games, allowing 11 runs in 10 innings for the rookie league Lethbridge Dodgers before a rotator cuff injury ended his career.
