= Jack Perconte =

American baseball player (born 1954)

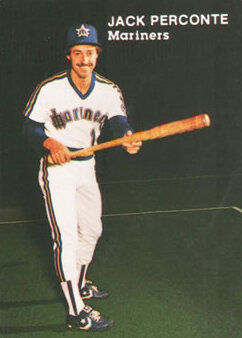
- Perconte with the Seattle Mariners c. 1984
- Second baseman
- Born: August 31, 1954 (age 72); Joliet, Illinois, U.S.
- Batted: Left Threw: Right

MLB debut
- September 13, 1980, for the Los Angeles Dodgers

Last MLB appearance
- October 4, 1986, for the Chicago White Sox

MLB statistics
- Batting average: .270
- Home runs: 2
- Runs batted in: 76
- Stats at Baseball Reference

Teams
- Los Angeles Dodgers (1980–1981); Cleveland Indians (1982–1983); Seattle Mariners (1984–1985); Chicago White Sox (1986)

John Patrick Perconte (/pərˈkɒntiː/ pər-KON-tee; born August 31, 1954) is an American former professional baseball second baseman. Perconte played in Major League Baseball (MLB) from 1980 to 1986.

Perconte attended Joliet Catholic Academy and played college baseball for the Murray State Racers from 1972 to 1975. He hit .349 in college, set many program records, and was inducted into the school's hall of fame in 1987.

The Los Angeles Dodgers selected Perconte in the 16th round of the 1976 MLB draft. He made his MLB debut with Los Angeles on September 13, 1980. The Dodgers traded Perconte and Rick Sutcliffe to the Cleveland Indians for Jorge Orta, Jack Fimple, and Larry White in December 1981. Cleveland traded Perconte and Gorman Thomas to the Seattle Mariners for Tony Bernazard in December 1983. His most productive seasons were with Seattle, hitting .281 and stealing 60 bases in 68 attempts over 280 games. Seattle released him in April 1986, and he signed with the Chicago White Sox, playing one more season in the majors. He played in the Dodgers' minor league system in 1987.

== Personal life ==
After his playing career, Perconte published several books, including a book on hitting, and written online about baseball.

Perconte's uncle, Frank Perconte, was a soldier of Easy Company, 506th Parachute Infantry Regiment, 101st Airborne Division during the Second World War and was portrayed by James Madio in Band of Brothers.

Perconte's son pitched at Murray State and in Minor League Baseball from 2008 to 2011. Perconte has run 20 marathons. He resides in Lisle, Illinois.
