= Bobby Castillo =

American baseball player (1955–2014)

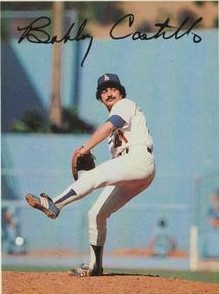
- Pitcher
- Born: April 18, 1955; Los Angeles, California, U.S.
- Died: June 30, 2014 (aged 59); Los Angeles, California, U.S.
- Batted: Right Threw: Right

Professional debut
- MLB: September 10, 1977, for the Los Angeles Dodgers
- NPB: September 17, 1987, for the Chunichi Dragons

Last appearance
- MLB: October 4, 1985, for the Los Angeles Dodgers
- NPB: September 24, 1987, for the Chunichi Dragons

MLB statistics
- Win–loss record: 38–40
- Earned run average: 3.94
- Strikeouts: 434

NPB statistics
- Win–loss record: 1–1
- Earned run average: 7.84
- Strikeouts: 9
- Stats at Baseball Reference

Teams
- Los Angeles Dodgers (1977–1981); Minnesota Twins (1982–1984); Los Angeles Dodgers (1985); Chunichi Dragons (1987)

Career highlights and awards
- World Series champion (1981)

Robert Ernie "Babo" Castillo Jr. (April 18, 1955 – June 30, 2014) was an American professional baseball pitcher. He played for the Los Angeles Dodgers and Minnesota Twins of Major League Baseball (MLB) between 1977 and 1985. He was in the bullpen for the Dodgers in the 1981 World Series, pitching one inning against the New York Yankees. He also pitched one season in Japan for the Chunichi Dragons in 1987. Castillo is credited with teaching his former Dodgers teammate, Fernando Valenzuela, how to throw a screwball.

Castillo died on June 30, 2014, from cancer at the age of 59.
