= John Urrea =

American baseball player (born 1955)

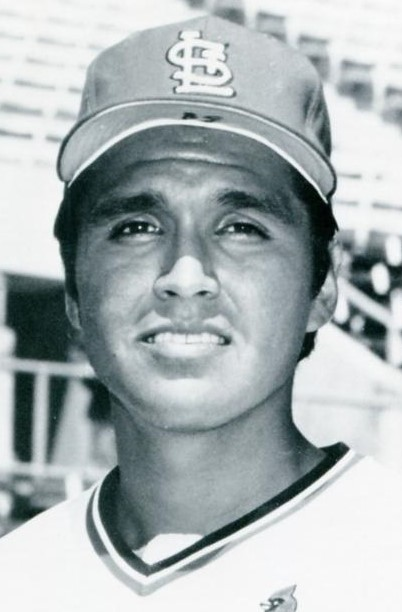
- Pitcher
- Born: February 9, 1955 (age 71); Los Angeles, California, U.S.
- Batted: Right Threw: Right

MLB debut
- April 10, 1977, for the St. Louis Cardinals

Last MLB appearance
- October 4, 1981, for the San Diego Padres

MLB statistics
- Win–loss record: 17–18
- Earned run average: 3.74
- Strikeouts: 202
- Stats at Baseball Reference

Teams
- St. Louis Cardinals (1977–1980); San Diego Padres (1981)

John Goody Urrea (born February 9, 1955) is a former professional baseball pitcher who played for the St. Louis Cardinals from 1977 to 1980 and the San Diego Padres in 1981.
