= John Littlefield =

American baseball player (born 1954)

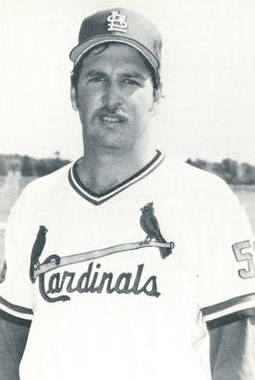
- Pitcher
- Born: January 5, 1954 (age 72); Covina, California, U.S.
- Batted: Right Threw: Right

MLB debut
- June 4, 1980, for the St. Louis Cardinals

Last MLB appearance
- October 4, 1981, for the San Diego Padres

MLB statistics
- Win–loss record: 7–8
- Earned run average: 3.39
- Strikeouts: 43
- Stats at Baseball Reference

Teams
- St. Louis Cardinals (1980); San Diego Padres (1981)

John Andrew Littlefield (born January 5, 1954) is a former Major League Baseball pitcher. He pitched two seasons in the major leagues, 1980 for the St. Louis Cardinals and 1981 for the San Diego Padres. He appeared in 94 games, all as a reliever. In 1980, he led the Cardinals with 9 saves and in games pitched, 52.

== Sources ==
- Career statistics from MLB · Baseball Reference · Baseball Reference (Minors) · Retrosheet · Baseball Almanac
