= 1976 New York Mets season =

1976 New York Mets
- League: National League
- Division: East
- Ballpark: Shea Stadium
- City: New York City
- Record: 86–76 (.531)
- Owners: Charles Shipman Payson
- General manager: Joe McDonald
- Manager: Joe Frazier
- Television: WOR-TV
- Radio: WNEW (Ralph Kiner, Lindsey Nelson, Bob Murphy)

The 1976 New York Mets season was the 15th regular season for the Mets, who played home games at Shea Stadium. Led by manager Joe Frazier, the team had an 86–76 record (the team's best finish in the 1970s) and finished in third place in the National League East, fifteen games behind the first place Philadelphia Phillies.

== Offseason ==
On December 6, Mrs. Lorinda de Roulet, daughter of the late Joan Payson, was named president of the Mets. The critical decisions, however, were still made by board chairman M. Donald Grant and General Manager Joe McDonald.

=== Notable transactions ===
- December 3, 1975: Kelvin Chapman was signed as an amateur free agent by the Mets.
- December 12, 1975: Rusty Staub and Bill Laxton were traded by the Mets to the Detroit Tigers for Mickey Lolich and Billy Baldwin.
- January 7, 1976: 1976 Major League Baseball draft
  - Greg Harris was drafted by the Mets in the 7th round, but did not sign.
  - Kim Seaman was drafted by the Mets in the 4th round of the Secondary Phase.
- March 5, 1976: Mario Ramírez was signed as an amateur free agent by the Mets.
- March 30, 1976: Jesús Alou was released by the Mets.

== Regular season ==
=== Season summary ===
On September 16, before a small crowd of 5,472 at Shea Stadium, Jerry Koosman overcame a home run by future Mets player Keith Hernandez to pitch a complete game and win his 20th game of the season for the first time in his career in a 4–1 victory over the St. Louis Cardinals. He became the second pitcher in Mets history to win 20 games.

=== Season standings ===
NL East
Team	W	L	Pct.	GB	Home	Road
Philadelphia Phillies	101	61	.623	—	53‍–‍28	48‍–‍33
Pittsburgh Pirates	92	70	.568	9	47‍–‍34	45‍–‍36
New York Mets	86	76	.531	15	45‍–‍37	41‍–‍39
Chicago Cubs	75	87	.463	26	42‍–‍39	33‍–‍48
St. Louis Cardinals	72	90	.444	29	37‍–‍44	35‍–‍46
Montreal Expos	55	107	.340	46	27‍–‍53	28‍–‍54

=== Record vs. opponents ===
1976 National League record Sources:
Team	ATL	CHC	CIN	HOU	LAD	MON	NYM	PHI	PIT	SD	SF	STL
Atlanta	—	6–6	6–12	7–11	8–10	8–4	4–8	5–7	3–9	10–8	9–9	4–8
Chicago	6–6	—	3–9	5–7	3–9	11–7	5–13	8–10	8–10	6–6	8–4	12–6
Cincinnati	12–6	9–3	—	12–6	13–5	9–3	6–6	5–7	8–4	13–5	9–9	6–6
Houston	11–7	7–5	6–12	—	5–13	10–2	6–6	4–8	2–10	10–8	10–8	9–3
Los Angeles	10–8	9–3	5–13	13–5	—	10–2	7–5	5–7	9–3	6–12	8–10	10–2
Montreal	4–8	7–11	3–9	2–10	2–10	—	8–10	3–15	8–10	4–8	7–5	7–11
New York	8–4	13–5	6–6	6–6	5–7	10–8	—	5–13	10–8	7–5	7–5	9–9
Philadelphia	7-5	10–8	7–5	8–4	7–5	15–3	13–5	—	8–10	8–4	6–6	12–6
Pittsburgh	9–3	10–8	4–8	10–2	3–9	10–8	8–10	10–8	—	7–5	9–3	12–6
San Diego	8–10	6–6	5–13	8–10	12–6	8–4	5–7	4–8	5–7	—	8–10	4–8
San Francisco	9–9	4–8	9–9	8–10	10–8	5–7	5–7	6–6	3–9	10–8	—	5–7
St. Louis	8–4	6–12	6–6	3–9	2–10	11–7	9–9	6–12	6–12	8–4	7–5	—

=== Notable transactions ===
- June 8, 1976: Dave Von Ohlen was drafted by the Mets in the 17th round of the 1976 Major League Baseball draft.
- July 21, 1976: Del Unser and Wayne Garrett were traded by the Mets to the Montreal Expos for Jim Dwyer and Pepe Mangual.
- September 17, 1976: Greg Harris was signed as an amateur free agent by the Mets.

=== Roster ===
1976 New York Mets
Roster
Pitchers: 34 Bob Apodaca; 45 Rick Baldwin; 39 Nino Espinosa; 19 Tom Hall; 36 Jerry Koosman; 38 Skip Lockwood; 29 Mickey Lolich; 32 Jon Matlack; 44 Bob Myrick; 33 Ken Sanders; 41 Tom Seaver; 27 Craig Swan; 30 Hank Webb	Catchers: 15 Jerry Grote; 42 Ron Hodges; 22 Jay Kleven; 16 John Stearns; Infielders: 1 Leo Foster; 11 Wayne Garrett; 3 Bud Harrelson; 12 Jack Heidemann; 7 Ed Kranepool; 17 Félix Millán; 5 Mike Phillips; 2 Roy Staiger; 9 Joe Torre	Outfielders: 18 Benny Ayala; 21 Billy Baldwin; 4 Bruce Boisclair; 23 Leon Brown; 25 Jim Dwyer; 26 Dave Kingman; 11 Pepe Mangual; 12 Lee Mazzilli; 28 John Milner; 25 Del Unser; 6 Mike Vail	Manager: 55 Joe Frazier; Coaches: 24 Willie Mays; 51 Roy McMillan; 52 Joe Pignatano; 54 Rube Walker; 53 Eddie Yost

== Player stats ==
=== Batting ===
==== Starters by position ====
Note: Pos = Position; G = Games played; AB = At bats; H = Hits; Avg. = Batting average; HR = Home runs; RBI = Runs batted in

Pos	Player	G	AB	H	Avg.	HR	RBI
C	Jerry Grote	101	323	88	.272	4	28
1B	Ed Kranepool	123	415	121	.292	10	49
2B	Félix Millán	139	531	150	.282	1	35
SS	Bud Harrelson	118	359	84	.234	1	26
3B	Roy Staiger	95	304	67	.220	2	26
LF	John Milner	127	443	120	.271	15	78
CF	Del Unser	77	276	63	.228	5	25
RF	Dave Kingman	123	474	113	.238	37	86

==== Other batters ====
Note: G = Games played; AB = At bats; H = Hits; Avg. = Batting average; HR = Home runs; RBI = Runs batted in

Player	G	AB	H	Avg.	HR	RBI
Joe Torre	114	310	95	.306	5	31
Bruce Boisclair	110	286	82	.287	2	13
Mike Phillips	87	262	67	.256	4	29
Wayne Garrett	80	251	56	.223	4	26
Ron Hodges	56	155	35	.226	4	24
Mike Vail	53	143	31	.217	0	9
John Stearns	32	103	27	.262	2	10
Pepe Mangual	41	102	19	.186	1	9
Lee Mazzilli	24	77	15	.195	2	7
Leon Brown	64	70	15	.214	0	2
Leo Foster	24	59	12	.203	1	15
Benny Ayala	22	26	3	.115	1	2
Billy Baldwin	9	22	6	.273	1	5
Jim Dwyer	11	13	2	.154	0	0
Jack Heidemann	5	12	1	.083	0	0
Jay Kleven	2	5	1	.200	0	2

=== Pitching ===
==== Starting pitchers ====
Note: G = Games pitched; IP = Innings pitched; W = Wins; L = Losses; ERA = Earned run average; SO = Strikeouts

Player	G	IP	W	L	ERA	SO
Tom Seaver	35	271.0	14	11	2.59	235
Jon Matlack	35	262.0	17	10	2.95	153
Jerry Koosman	34	247.1	21	10	2.69	200
Mickey Lolich	31	192.2	8	13	3.22	120
Craig Swan	23	132.1	6	9	3.54	89

==== Other pitchers ====
Note: G = Games pitched; IP = Innings pitched; W = Wins; L = Losses; ERA = Earned run average; SO = Strikeouts

Player	G	IP	W	L	ERA	SO
Nino Espinosa	12	41.2	4	4	3.67	30

==== Relief pitchers ====
Note: G = Games pitched; W = Wins; L = Losses; SV = Saves; ERA = Earned run average; SO = Strikeouts

Player	G	IP	W	L	SV	ERA	SO
Skip Lockwood	56	94.1	10	7	19	2.67	108
Bob Apodaca	43	89.2	3	7	5	2.81	45
Ken Sanders	31	47.0	1	2	1	2.87	16
Bob Myrick	21	27.2	1	1	0	3.25	11
Rick Baldwin	11	22.2	0	0	0	2.38	9
Hank Webb	8	16.0	0	1	0	4.50	7
Tom Hall	5	4.2	1	1	0	5.79	2

== Farm system ==
Level	Team	League	Manager
AAA	Tidewater Tides	International League	Tom Burgess
AA	Jackson Mets	Texas League	John Antonelli
A	Lynchburg Mets	Carolina League	Jack Aker
A	Wausau Mets	Midwest League	Bill Monbouquette
Rookie	Marion Mets	Appalachian League	Al Jackson
