= 1976 Montreal Expos season =

1976 Montreal Expos
- League: National League
- Division: East
- Ballpark: Jarry Park
- City: Montreal
- Record: 55–107 (.340)
- Divisional place: 6th
- Owners: Charles Bronfman
- General managers: Jim Fanning
- Managers: Karl Kuehl, Charlie Fox
- Television: CBC Television (Dave Van Horne, Duke Snider); Télévision de Radio-Canada (Jean-Pierre Roy, Guy Ferron)
- Radio: CFCF (English) (Dave Van Horne, Duke Snider, Russ Taylor); CKAC (French) (Claude Raymond, Jacques Doucet)

The 1976 Montreal Expos season was the eighth season in the history of the franchise. The Expos finished in last place in the National League East with a record of 55–107, 46 games behind the Philadelphia Phillies. This was their final season at Jarry Park; they relocated to Olympic Stadium for the 1977 season.

== Offseason ==
- December 22, 1975: Rodney Scott was sent to the Expos by the Kansas City Royals to complete an earlier deal (the Royals sent a player to be named later to the Expos for Bob Stinson) made on March 31, 1975.
- Prior to 1976 season: Roger Freed was acquired from the Sultanes de Monterrey.

== Spring training ==
The Expos held spring training at City Island Ball Park in Daytona Beach, Florida, their fourth season there.

== Regular season ==
- April 21, 1976: Shortstop Tim Foli (hitting in the number seven slot) hit for the cycle at Wrigley Field against the Chicago Cubs in front of a crowd of 7,277, the first in Expos history to achieve the feat. Pitcher Woodie Fryman picked up the victory.

=== Season standings ===
NL East
Team	W	L	Pct.	GB	Home	Road
Philadelphia Phillies	101	61	.623	—	53‍–‍28	48‍–‍33
Pittsburgh Pirates	92	70	.568	9	47‍–‍34	45‍–‍36
New York Mets	86	76	.531	15	45‍–‍37	41‍–‍39
Chicago Cubs	75	87	.463	26	42‍–‍39	33‍–‍48
St. Louis Cardinals	72	90	.444	29	37‍–‍44	35‍–‍46
Montreal Expos	55	107	.340	46	27‍–‍53	28‍–‍54

=== Record vs. opponents ===
1976 National League record Sources:
Team	ATL	CHC	CIN	HOU	LAD	MON	NYM	PHI	PIT	SD	SF	STL
Atlanta	—	6–6	6–12	7–11	8–10	8–4	4–8	5–7	3–9	10–8	9–9	4–8
Chicago	6–6	—	3–9	5–7	3–9	11–7	5–13	8–10	8–10	6–6	8–4	12–6
Cincinnati	12–6	9–3	—	12–6	13–5	9–3	6–6	5–7	8–4	13–5	9–9	6–6
Houston	11–7	7–5	6–12	—	5–13	10–2	6–6	4–8	2–10	10–8	10–8	9–3
Los Angeles	10–8	9–3	5–13	13–5	—	10–2	7–5	5–7	9–3	6–12	8–10	10–2
Montreal	4–8	7–11	3–9	2–10	2–10	—	8–10	3–15	8–10	4–8	7–5	7–11
New York	8–4	13–5	6–6	6–6	5–7	10–8	—	5–13	10–8	7–5	7–5	9–9
Philadelphia	7-5	10–8	7–5	8–4	7–5	15–3	13–5	—	8–10	8–4	6–6	12–6
Pittsburgh	9–3	10–8	4–8	10–2	3–9	10–8	8–10	10–8	—	7–5	9–3	12–6
San Diego	8–10	6–6	5–13	8–10	12–6	8–4	5–7	4–8	5–7	—	8–10	4–8
San Francisco	9–9	4–8	9–9	8–10	10–8	5–7	5–7	6–6	3–9	10–8	—	5–7
St. Louis	8–4	6–12	6–6	3–9	2–10	11–7	9–9	6–12	6–12	8–4	7–5	—

=== Opening Day starters ===
- Gary Carter
- Nate Colbert
- Tim Foli
- Mike Jorgensen
- Pete Mackanin
- Larry Parrish
- Bombo Rivera
- Steve Rogers
- Jerry White

=== Notable transactions ===
- May 17: Steve Renko and Larry Biitner were traded to the Chicago Cubs for Andre Thornton.
- June 2: Nate Colbert was released.
- June 8: 1976 Major League Baseball draft
  - Dan Schatzeder was selected in the 3rd round, and signed June 18.
  - Jack O'Connor was selected in the 9th round, and signed June 18.
- July 21: Jim Dwyer and Pepe Mangual were traded to the New York Mets for Del Unser and Wayne Garrett.

== Roster ==
1976 Montreal Expos
Roster
Pitchers: 52 Bill Atkinson; 28 Dennis Blair; 40 Don Carrithers; 36 Steve Dunning; 35 Woodie Fryman; 47 Wayne Granger; 12 Gerry Hannahs; 56 Joe Keener; 18 Joe Kerrigan; 31 Clay Kirby; 57 Larry Landreth; 33 Chip Lang; 27 Dale Murray; 18 Steve Renko; 45 Steve Rogers; 21 Fred Scherman; 26 Don Stanhouse; 21 Chuck Taylor; 39 Dan Warthen	Catchers: 8 Gary Carter; 9 Barry Foote; 47 Larry Johnson; Infielders: 10 Jim Cox; 19 Tim Foli; 23 Roger Freed; 38 Pepe Frías; 11 Wayne Garrett; 16 Mike Jorgensen; 5 Pete Mackanin; 34 José Morales; 15 Larry Parrish; 42 Pat Scanlon; 12 Rodney Scott; 17 Andre Thornton; 32 Earl Williams	Outfielders: 17 Larry Biittner; 24 Nate Colbert; 49 Warren Cromartie; 10 Andre Dawson; 43 Jim Dwyer; 20 Jim Lyttle; 11 Pepe Mangual; 44 Bombo Rivera; 29,32 Gary Roenicke; 25 Del Unser; 17 Ellis Valentine; 37 Jerry White	Manager: 4 Charlie Fox; 6 Karl Kuehl; Coaches: 46 Bill Adair (First base); 48 Larry Bearnarth (Pitching); 14 Larry Doby (Hitting); 41 Ron Piché (Bullpen); 1 Ozzie Virgil (Third base)

== Player stats ==
= Indicates team leader among qualifying players

=== Batting ===
==== Starters by position ====
Note: Pos = Position; G = Games played; AB = At bats; H = Hits; Avg. = Batting average; HR = Home runs; RBI = Runs batted in; SB = Stolen Bases

Pos	Player	G	AB	H	Avg.	HR	RBI	SB
1B	Mike Jorgensen	125	343	87	.254	6	23	7
2B	Pete Mackanin	114	380	85	.224	8	33	6
3B	Larry Parrish	154	543	126	.232	11	61	2
SS	Tim Foli	149	546	144	.264	6	54	6
LF	Bombo Rivera	68	185	51	.276	2	19	1
RF	Gary Carter	91	311	68	.219	6	38	0
CF	Ellis Valentine	94	305	85	.279	7	39	14
C	Barry Foote	105	350	82	.234	7	27	2

==== Other batters ====
Note: G = Games played; AB = At bats; H = Hits; Avg. = Batting average; HR = Home runs; RBI = Runs batted in; SB = Stolen Bases

Player	G	AB	H	Avg.	HR	RBI	SB
Jerry White	114	278	68	.245	2	21	15
Del Unser	69	220	50	.227	7	15	3
Pepe Mangual	66	215	56	.260	3	16	17
Earl Williams	61	190	45	.237	8	29	0
Andre Thornton	69	183	35	.191	9	24	2
Wayne Garrett	59	177	43	.243	2	11	2
José Morales	104	158	50	.316	4	37	0
Pepe Frías	76	113	28	.248	0	8	1
Jim Dwyer	50	92	17	.185	0	5	0
Gary Roenicke	29	90	20	.222	2	5	0
Jim Lyttle	42	85	23	.271	1	8	0
Andre Dawson	24	85	20	.235	0	7	1
Warren Cromartie	33	81	17	.210	0	2	1
Nate Colbert	14	40	8	.200	2	6	3
Larry Biittner	11	32	6	.188	0	1	0
Jim Cox	13	29	5	.172	0	2	0
Pat Scanlon	11	27	5	.185	1	2	0
Roger Freed	8	15	3	.200	0	1	0
Larry Johnson	6	13	2	.154	0	0	0
Rodney Scott	7	10	4	.400	0	0	2

=== Pitching ===
==== Starting pitchers ====
Note: G = Games pitched; IP = Innings pitched; W = Wins; L = Losses; ERA = Earned run average; SO = Strikeouts

Player	G	IP	W	L	ERA	SO
Steve Rogers	33	230.0	7	17	3.21	150
Woodie Fryman	34	216.1	13	13	3.36	123
Don Stanhouse	34	184.0	9	12	3.77	79
Gerry Hannahs	3	16.0	2	0	6.75	10
Dennis Blair	5	15.2	0	2	4.02	9
Larry Landreth	3	11.0	1	2	4.09	7
Joe Keener	2	4.1	0	1	10.38	1

==== Other pitchers ====
Note: G = Games pitched; IP = Innings pitched; W = Wins; L = Losses; ERA = Earned run average; SO = Strikeouts

Player	G	IP	W	L	ERA	SO
Don Carrithers	34	140.1	6	12	4.43	71
Steve Dunning	32	91.1	2	6	4.14	72
Dan Warthen	23	90.0	2	10	5.30	67
Clay Kirby	22	78.2	1	8	5.72	51
Steve Renko	5	13.0	0	1	5.54	4

==== Relief pitchers ====
Note: G = Games pitched; W = Wins; L = Losses; SV = Saves; ERA = Earned run average; SO = Strikeouts

Player	G	W	L	SV	ERA	SO
Dale Murray	81	4	9	13	3.26	35
Joe Kerrigan	38	2	6	1	3.81	22
Chuck Taylor	31	2	3	0	4.50	14
Fred Scherman	31	2	2	1	4.95	18
Chip Lang	29	1	3	0	4.19	30
Wayne Granger	27	1	0	2	3.66	16
Bill Atkinson	4	0	0	0	0.00	4

== Awards and honors ==
1976 Major League Baseball All-Star Game

- Woodie Fryman, pitcher, reserve

== Farm system ==
Level	Team	League	Manager
AAA	Denver Bears	American Association	Vern Rapp
AA	Québec Métros	Eastern League	Lance Nichols
A	West Palm Beach Expos	Florida State League	Gordon Mackenzie
Rookie	Lethbridge Expos	Pioneer League	Walt Hriniak

LEAGUE CHAMPIONS: Denver
