= 1976 Philadelphia Phillies season =

Major League Baseball season

1976 Philadelphia Phillies
- National League East champions
- League: National League
- Division: East
- Ballpark: Veterans Stadium
- City: Philadelphia
- Owners: R. R. M. "Ruly" Carpenter III
- General managers: Paul Owens
- Managers: Danny Ozark
- Television: WPHL-TV
- Radio: WIBG (Harry Kalas, Richie Ashburn, Andy Musser)

The 1976 Philadelphia Phillies season was the 94th season in the history of the franchise. The Phillies won their first postseason berth since 1950 and their first National League East title, as they compiled a record of 101–61, nine games ahead of the second-place Pittsburgh Pirates, and won 100 games or more for the first time in franchise history.

The Phillies lost the NLCS, 3–0 to the Cincinnati Reds. Danny Ozark managed the Phillies in his fourth year, as they played their home games at Veterans Stadium, where the All-Star Game was played that season.

== Offseason ==
- October 24, 1975: Larry Cox was traded by the Phillies to the Minnesota Twins for Sergio Ferrer.
- December 10, 1975: Dick Ruthven, Roy Thomas, and Alan Bannister were traded by the Phillies to the Chicago White Sox for Jim Kaat and Mike Buskey.
- December 27, 1975: Luis Aguayo was signed by the Phillies as an amateur free agent.
- January 7, 1976: Derek Botelho was drafted by the Phillies in the 2nd round of the 1976 Major League Baseball draft. Player signed May 5, 1976.

== Regular season ==
The final 9-game margin masks how competitive the season actually was. In a scary echo of 1964, the Phillies saw a 15 1/2-game August lead dwindle to just 3 games as their offense dried up on two late-year road trips.

Mike Schmidt hit 12 home runs in Philadelphia's first 15 games, including four in one game on April 17. No one had hit this many home runs so quickly. In that game, the Phillies and Chicago Cubs combined for thirty-four runs in a game which featured nine home runs. Schmidt's home run feat was later tied by Alex Rodriguez in 2007.

Schmidt also won his first of 10 Gold Gloves that year, and carried the Phillies to the 1976 NLCS where he hit .308. The Phillies hit a major league-leading seven grand slams.

=== Season standings ===
NL East
Team	W	L	Pct.	GB	Home	Road
Philadelphia Phillies	101	61	.623	—	53‍–‍28	48‍–‍33
Pittsburgh Pirates	92	70	.568	9	47‍–‍34	45‍–‍36
New York Mets	86	76	.531	15	45‍–‍37	41‍–‍39
Chicago Cubs	75	87	.463	26	42‍–‍39	33‍–‍48
St. Louis Cardinals	72	90	.444	29	37‍–‍44	35‍–‍46
Montreal Expos	55	107	.340	46	27‍–‍53	28‍–‍54

=== Record vs. opponents ===
1976 National League record Sources:
Team	ATL	CHC	CIN	HOU	LAD	MON	NYM	PHI	PIT	SD	SF	STL
Atlanta	—	6–6	6–12	7–11	8–10	8–4	4–8	5–7	3–9	10–8	9–9	4–8
Chicago	6–6	—	3–9	5–7	3–9	11–7	5–13	8–10	8–10	6–6	8–4	12–6
Cincinnati	12–6	9–3	—	12–6	13–5	9–3	6–6	5–7	8–4	13–5	9–9	6–6
Houston	11–7	7–5	6–12	—	5–13	10–2	6–6	4–8	2–10	10–8	10–8	9–3
Los Angeles	10–8	9–3	5–13	13–5	—	10–2	7–5	5–7	9–3	6–12	8–10	10–2
Montreal	4–8	7–11	3–9	2–10	2–10	—	8–10	3–15	8–10	4–8	7–5	7–11
New York	8–4	13–5	6–6	6–6	5–7	10–8	—	5–13	10–8	7–5	7–5	9–9
Philadelphia	7-5	10–8	7–5	8–4	7–5	15–3	13–5	—	8–10	8–4	6–6	12–6
Pittsburgh	9–3	10–8	4–8	10–2	3–9	10–8	8–10	10–8	—	7–5	9–3	12–6
San Diego	8–10	6–6	5–13	8–10	12–6	8–4	5–7	4–8	5–7	—	8–10	4–8
San Francisco	9–9	4–8	9–9	8–10	10–8	5–7	5–7	6–6	3–9	10–8	—	5–7
St. Louis	8–4	6–12	6–6	3–9	2–10	11–7	9–9	6–12	6–12	8–4	7–5	—

=== Notable transactions ===
- April 9, 1976: Wayne Nordhagen was purchased by the Phillies from the St. Louis Cardinals.
- May 14, 1976: Bobby Brown was signed as a free agent by the Phillies.
- July 14, 1976: Wayne Nordhagen was traded by the Phillies to the Chicago White Sox for Rich Coggins.

==== Draft picks ====
- June 8, 1976: Joe Charboneau was drafted by the Phillies in the 2nd round of the secondary phase of the 1976 Major League Baseball draft. Player signed June 10, 1976.

=== Game log ===
Legend
	Phillies win
	Phillies loss
	Postponement
**Bold**	Phillies team member

1976 Game Log
Overall Record: 101–61
April (8–6)

#	Date	Opponent	Score	Win	Loss	Save	Attendance	Record
1	April 10	Pirates	4–5 (11)	Larry Demery (1–0)	**Tug McGraw** (0–1)	None	42,147	0–1
2	April 11	Pirates	3–8	Bruce Kison (1–0)	**Steve Carlton** (0–1)	Bob Moose (1)	18,373	0–2
3	April 14	@ Expos	8–2	**Jim Lonborg** (1–0)	Steve Rogers (0–2)	None	21,199	1–2
4	April 15	@ Expos	5–8	Woodie Fryman (1–1)	**Jim Kaat** (0–1)	Wayne Granger (1)	6,375	1–3
5	April 17	@ Cubs	18–16 (10)	**Tug McGraw** (1–1)	Darold Knowles (1–1)	**Jim Lonborg** (1)	28,287	2–3
6	April 18	@ Cubs	8–5	**Larry Christenson** (1–0)	Ray Burris (0–2)	**Gene Garber** (1)	13,326	3–3
7	April 20	@ Pirates	5–1	**Jim Kaat** (1–1)	John Candelaria (0–1)	None	8,800	4–3
8	April 21	@ Pirates	3–0	**Tom Underwood** (1–0)	Doc Medich (1–1)	**Tug McGraw** (1)	9,175	5–3
9	April 23	Braves	5–6	Bruce Dal Canton (1–0)	**Tug McGraw** (1–2)	Elías Sosa (1)	29,398	5–4
10	April 24	Braves	10–5	**Ron Reed** (1–0)	Elías Sosa (1–2)	None	25,477	6–4
11	April 25	Braves	2–3	Phil Niekro (3–0)	**Larry Christenson** (1–1)	Elías Sosa (2)	10,565	6–5
12	April 26	Reds	10–9	**Tug McGraw** (2–2)	Rawly Eastwick (1–1)	None	16,565	7–5
13	April 27	Reds	3–7	Jack Billingham (2–2)	**Tom Underwood** (1–1)	None	17,818	7–6
14	April 28	Reds	7–6	**Jim Lonborg** (2–0)	Pat Darcy (1–2)	**Tug McGraw** (2)	20,215	8–6
–	April 30	@ Braves	Postponed (rain); Makeup: May 1 as a traditional double-header					

May (22–5)

#	Date	Opponent	Score	Win	Loss	Save	Attendance	Record
15	May 1 (1)	@ Braves	3–0	**Larry Christenson** (2–1)	Dick Ruthven (3–2)	**Tug McGraw** (3)	see 2nd game	9–6
16	May 1 (2)	@ Braves	4–2	**Steve Carlton** (1–1)	Carl Morton (0–3)	None	24,189	10–6
17	May 2	@ Braves	8–2	**Jim Kaat** (2–1)	Andy Messersmith (0–2)	**Gene Garber** (2)	20,479	11–6
18	May 4	Astros	5–0	**Jim Lonborg** (3–0)	Larry Dierker (3–3)	None	10,655	12–6
19	May 5	Astros	6–3	**Ron Reed** (2–0)	Joe Niekro (1–5)	**Gene Garber** (3)	17,944	13–6
20	May 7	Dodgers	8–10	Charlie Hough (2–0)	**Ron Reed** (2–1)	Mike Marshall (6)	28,862	13–7
21	May 8	Dodgers	6–4	**Gene Garber** (1–0)	Tommy John (1–2)	None	34,060	14–7
22	May 9	Dodgers	10–3	**Jim Lonborg** (4–0)	Doug Rau (4–1)	None	24,143	15–7
23	May 11	Padres	9–1	**Steve Carlton** (2–1)	Dan Spillner (1–5)	None	11,576	16–7
24	May 12	Padres	0–4	Randy Jones (6–2)	**Jim Kaat** (2–2)	None	20,043	16–8
25	May 14	@ Astros	5–1	**Larry Christenson** (3–1)	Mike Cosgrove (1–2)	None	14,264	17–8
26	May 15	@ Astros	2–1	**Jim Lonborg** (5–0)	Larry Dierker (4–4)	None	20,749	18–8
27	May 16	@ Astros	12–2	**Steve Carlton** (3–1)	Tom Griffin (2–1)	None	11,553	19–8
–	May 18	@ Mets	Postponed (rain); Makeup: August 1 as a traditional double-header					
28	May 19	@ Mets	2–1	**Larry Christenson** (4–1)	Mickey Lolich (2–5)	**Tom Underwood** (1)	12,836	20–8
29	May 20	@ Mets	5–3	**Jim Lonborg** (6–0)	Tom Seaver (4–3)	**Tug McGraw** (4)	16,914	21–8
30	May 21	Cardinals	2–1	**Steve Carlton** (4–1)	Pete Falcone (2–3)	None	32,074	22–8
31	May 22	Cardinals	6–7	Al Hrabosky (1–3)	**Tug McGraw** (2–3)	None	39,098	22–9
32	May 23	Cardinals	3–2 (11)	**Tug McGraw** (3–3)	Al Hrabosky (1–4)	None	37,537	23–9
33	May 24	Mets	7–1	**Larry Christenson** (5–1)	Mickey Lolich (2–6)	None	21,899	24–9
34	May 25	Mets	8–4	**Jim Lonborg** (7–0)	Tom Seaver (4–4)	None	32,772	25–9
35	May 25	Mets	5–0	**Steve Carlton** (5–1)	Jon Matlack (4–1)	None	28,306	26–9
36	May 27	Mets	2–5	Jerry Koosman (6–1)	**Gene Garber** (1–1)	Skip Lockwood (7)	29,525	26–10
37	May 28	Expos	10–3	**Ron Reed** (3–1)	Don Stanhouse (2–1)	None	23,011	27–10
38	May 29	Expos	6–1	**Larry Christenson** (6–1)	Don Carrithers (1–3)	**Gene Garber** (4)	18,063	28–10
39	May 30	Expos	7–1	**Jim Lonborg** (8–0)	Clay Kirby (0–3)	None	27,090	29–10
40	May 31 (1)	Cubs	5–7	Rick Reuschel (5–3)	**Steve Carlton** (5–2)	Bruce Sutter (2)	see 2nd game	29–11
41	May 31 (2)	Cubs	4–1	**Jim Kaat** (3–2)	Mike Garman (2–4)	None	51,211	30–11

June (20–9)

#	Date	Opponent	Score	Win	Loss	Save	Attendance	Record
42	June 1	Cubs	6–1 (6)	**Ron Reed** (4–1)	Steve Renko (1–2)	None	26,846	31–11
43	June 2	@ Cardinals	4–1	**Tom Underwood** (2–1)	John Curtis (3–5)	None	16,850	32–11
44	June 3	@ Cardinals	1–7	Bob Forsch (1–1)	**Larry Christenson** (6–2)	None	15,832	32–12
45	June 4	@ Giants	1–5	Jim Barr (3–4)	**Jim Lonborg** (8–1)	None	7,374	32–13
46	June 5	@ Giants	2–4	Ed Halicki (4–8)	**Steve Carlton** (5–3)	Randy Moffitt (2)	9,439	32–14
47	June 6	@ Giants	9–3	**Jim Kaat** (4–2)	John Montefusco (6–5)	None	30,218	33–14
48	June 7	@ Dodgers	8–6	**Ron Reed** (5–1)	Charlie Hough (7–1)	**Gene Garber** (5)	30,627	34–14
49	June 8	@ Dodgers	14–2	**Larry Christenson** (7–2)	Tommy John (2–4)	None	27,950	35–14
50	June 9	@ Dodgers	2–3	Burt Hooton (5–5)	**Jim Lonborg** (8–2)	Charlie Hough (2)	27,794	35–15
51	June 10	@ Dodgers	10–6 (12)	**Tug McGraw** (4–3)	Stan Wall (1–2)	**Ron Schueler** (1)	27,052	36–15
52	June 11	@ Padres	4–2	**Jim Kaat** (5–2)	Alan Foster (1–3)	**Tom Underwood** (2)	15,754	37–15
53	June 12	@ Padres	3–2 (15)	**Tom Underwood** (3–1)	Ken Reynolds (0–2)	**Ron Schueler** (2)	24,515	38–15
54	June 13 (1)	@ Padres	0–5	Randy Jones (12–2)	**Jim Lonborg** (8–3)	None	see 2nd game	38–16
55	June 13 (2)	@ Padres	3–4	Rich Folkers (2–1)	**Larry Christenson** (7–3)	Butch Metzger (7)	43,473	38–17
56	June 15	Giants	10–2	**Steve Carlton** (6–3)	Ed Halicki (4–10)	None	28,564	39–17
57	June 16	Giants	6–1	**Jim Kaat** (6–2)	John Montefusco (7–6)	None	28,966	40–17
58	June 17	Giants	3–2	**Gene Garber** (2–1)	Gary Lavelle (2–4)	None	27,800	41–17
59	June 18	Reds	6–5	**Jim Lonborg** (9–3)	Jack Billingham (5–5)	**Gene Garber** (6)	50,635	42–17
60	June 19	Reds	3–4	Gary Nolan (7–3)	**Ron Reed** (5–2)	Rawly Eastwick (8)	36,808	42–18
61	June 20	Reds	6–1	**Jim Kaat** (7–2)	Don Gullett (6–3)	None	38,669	43–18
62	June 21	Expos	8–3	**Tom Underwood** (4–1)	Dan Warthen (1–8)	None	26,148	44–18
63	June 22	Expos	3–8	Clay Kirby (1–5)	**Jim Lonborg** (9–4)	Dale Murray (6)	32,138	44–19
64	June 23	@ Reds	4–2	**Ron Reed** (6–2)	Pedro Borbón (0–1)	**Gene Garber** (7)	35,266	45–19
65	June 24	@ Reds	5–4	**Jim Kaat** (8–2)	Gary Nolan (7–4)	**Tug McGraw** (5)	34,053	46–19
66	June 25	Cardinals	12–4	**Larry Christenson** (8–3)	John Curtis (5–7)	None	38,474	47–19
67	June 26	Cardinals	2–3 (10)	Al Hrabosky (5–5)	**Tug McGraw** (4–4)	None	41,052	47–20
68	June 27	Cardinals	6–2	**Jim Lonborg** (10–4)	Lynn McGlothen (6–7)	**Ron Reed** (1)	31,489	48–20
69	June 28	@ Expos	6–2	**Steve Carlton** (7–3)	Steve Rogers (2–5)	None	14,177	49–20
70	June 29	@ Expos	2–1	**Gene Garber** (3–1)	Dale Murray (0–6)	**Ron Reed** (2)	10,939	50–20
–	June 30	@ Expos	Postponed (rain); Makeup: September 24 as a traditional double-header					

July (17–12)

#	Date	Opponent	Score	Win	Loss	Save	Attendance	Record
–	July 1	@ Expos	Postponed (rain); Makeup: September 26 as a traditional double-header					
71	July 2	@ Pirates	9–10 (10)	Ramón Hernández (2–1)	**Gene Garber** (3–2)	None	39,328	50–21
72	July 3	@ Pirates	3–2	**Tug McGraw** (5–4)	Bob Moose (3–4)	None	19,327	51–21
73	July 4 (1)	@ Pirates	10–5	**Steve Carlton** (8–3)	Larry Demery (5–2)	**Ron Reed** (3)	see 2nd game	52–21
74	July 4 (2)	@ Pirates	1–7	Bruce Kison (7–4)	**Jim Kaat** (8–3)	None	32,422	52–22
75	July 5	Dodgers	0–6	Burt Hooton (6–9)	**Jim Lonborg** (10–5)	None	60,943	52–23
76	July 6	Dodgers	1–5	Doug Rau (7–6)	**Larry Christenson** (8–4)	None	34,126	52–24
77	July 7	Dodgers	5–6	Don Sutton (8–8)	**Ron Reed** (6–3)	Charlie Hough (8)	35,013	52–25
78	July 9	Padres	4–3	**Tom Underwood** (5–1)	Brent Strom (8–9)	**Ron Reed** (4)	35,217	53–25
79	July 10 (1)	Padres	5–0	**Steve Carlton** (9–3)	Alan Foster (3–6)	None	see 2nd game	54–25
80	July 10 (2)	Padres	4–2	**Jim Lonborg** (11–5)	Dan Spillner (2–9)	**Ron Reed** (5)	47,101	55–25
81	July 11	Padres	3–0	**Jim Kaat** (9–3)	Dave Freisleben (6–5)	None	46,807	56–25
–	July 13	**1976 Major League Baseball All-Star Game at Veterans Stadium in Philadelphia**						
82	July 15	@ Giants	5–3	**Steve Carlton** (10–3)	Mike Caldwell (0–6)	None	5,759	57–25
83	July 16	@ Giants	0–1	Ed Halicki (9–11)	**Jim Kaat** (9–4)	None	7,330	57–26
84	July 17	@ Giants	1–4	John Montefusco (8–8)	**Tom Underwood** (5–2)	None	8,909	57–27
85	July 18	@ Dodgers	2–1	**Ron Reed** (7–3)	Charlie Hough (7–4)	None	52,214	58–27
86	July 19	@ Dodgers	5–3	**Gene Garber** (4–2)	Burt Hooton (6–10)	**Ron Reed** (6)	37,109	59–27
87	July 20	@ Padres	0–3	Randy Jones (17–4)	**Steve Carlton** (10–4)	None	20,499	59–28
88	July 21	@ Padres	5–1	**Jim Kaat** (10–4)	Dave Freisleben (6–7)	**Gene Garber** (8)	14,996	60–28
89	July 22	Pirates	3–0	**Tom Underwood** (6–2)	Bruce Kison (7–6)	**Ron Reed** (7)	43,050	61–28
90	July 23	Pirates	11–1	**Jim Lonborg** (12–5)	Doc Medich (5–9)	None	40,120	62–28
91	July 24 (1)	Pirates	5–8	Jim Rooker (8–5)	**Larry Christenson** (8–5)	Dave Giusti (5)	see 2nd game	62–29
92	July 24 (2)	Pirates	7–1	**Steve Carlton** (11–4)	Bob Moose (3–5)	None	57,723	63–29
93	July 25	Pirates	13–7	**Ron Reed** (8–3)	Dave Giusti (0–2)	None	37,692	64–29
94	July 26	Mets	4–1	**Larry Christenson** (9–5)	Jon Matlack (10–5)	**Tug McGraw** (6)	35,023	65–29
95	July 27	Mets	1–4	Bob Myrick (1–0)	**Tom Underwood** (6–3)	Skip Lockwood (10)	35,376	65–30
96	July 28	Cubs	2–5 (11)	Bruce Sutter (2–2)	**Ron Reed** (8–4)	None	35,043	65–31
97	July 29	Cubs	3–2 (11)	**Gene Garber** (5–2)	Darold Knowles (3–4)	None	35,154	66–31
98	July 30	@ Mets	2–3	Jerry Koosman (12–7)	**Jim Kaat** (10–5)	None	26,548	66–32
99	July 31	@ Mets	2–1	**Larry Christenson** (10–5)	Jon Matlack (10–6)	**Tug McGraw** (7)	22,792	67–32

August (16–15)

#	Date	Opponent	Score	Win	Loss	Save	Attendance	Record
100	August 1 (1)	@ Mets	7–6 (11)	**Gene Garber** (6–2)	Skip Lockwood (6–6)	None	see 2nd game	68–32
101	August 1 (2)	@ Mets	2–0	**Wayne Twitchell** (1–0)	Nino Espinosa (0–2)	**Ron Schueler** (3)	34,413	69–32
102	August 2	@ Cubs	2–4	Bill Bonham (7–9)	**Jim Lonborg** (12–6)	Joe Coleman (3)	9,525	69–33
103	August 3 (1)	@ Cubs	0–4	Rick Reuschel (10–8)	**Jim Kaat** (10–6)	None	see 2nd game	69–34
104	August 3 (2)	@ Cubs	8–5	**Steve Carlton** (12–4)	Steve Stone (2–4)	**Ron Reed** (8)	27,636	70–34
105	August 4	@ Cubs	7–5	**Gene Garber** (7–2)	Joe Coleman (2–10)	None	16,070	71–34
106	August 5	@ Cardinals	5–2 (8)	**Wayne Twitchell** (2–0)	Lynn McGlothen (9–11)	None	15,569	72–34
107	August 6	@ Cardinals	2–6	John Denny (6–5)	**Jim Lonborg** (12–7)	Al Hrabosky (11)	25,339	72–35
108	August 7	@ Cardinals	1–4	Pete Falcone (8–11)	**Jim Kaat** (10–7)	Al Hrabosky (12)	32,105	72–36
109	August 8	@ Cardinals	3–2	**Steve Carlton** (13–4)	Bill Greif (2–7)	**Ron Reed** (9)	27,448	73–36
110	August 10	Braves	1–2	Phil Niekro (12–8)	**Larry Christenson** (10–6)	Adrian Devine (2)	30,323	73–37
111	August 11	Braves	4–1	**Tom Underwood** (7–3)	Carl Morton (2–9)	**Ron Reed** (10)	30,247	74–37
112	August 12	Braves	3–4	Frank LaCorte (1–6)	**Jim Lonborg** (12–8)	Adrian Devine (3)	30,415	74–38
113	August 13	Giants	0–3	John Montefusco (13–9)	**Jim Kaat** (10–8)	None	32,642	74–39
114	August 14	Giants	13–2	**Steve Carlton** (14–4)	Jim Barr (10–9)	None	38,368	75–39
115	August 15	Giants	5–9	Randy Moffitt (5–4)	**Gene Garber** (7–3)	None	28,316	75–40
116	August 17	Expos	11–3	**Tom Underwood** (8–3)	Steve Rogers (5–11)	None	27,188	76–40
117	August 18	Expos	5–4	**Jim Lonborg** (13–8)	Don Stanhouse (8–7)	**Ron Reed** (11)	28,483	77–40
118	August 19	Astros	7–1	**Steve Carlton** (15–4)	Joaquín Andújar (6–9)	None	35,605	78–40
119	August 20	Astros	3–8	Dan Larson (3–4)	**Wayne Twitchell** (2–1)	None	36,049	78–41
120	August 21	Astros	7–4	**Jim Kaat** (11–8)	J. R. Richard (14–13)	**Ron Reed** (12)	37,756	79–41
121	August 22	Astros	5–1	**Tom Underwood** (9–3)	Larry Dierker (12–12)	None	43,513	80–41
122	August 23	@ Braves	4–2	**Jim Lonborg** (14–8)	Dick Ruthven (13–12)	**Tug McGraw** (8)	11,600	81–41
123	August 24	@ Braves	14–3	**Steve Carlton** (16–4)	Andy Messersmith (11–11)	None	25,156	82–41
124	August 25	@ Braves	1–5	Phil Niekro (14–9)	**Larry Christenson** (10–7)	None	7,514	82–42
125	August 26	@ Reds	5–4 (13)	**Tug McGraw** (6–4)	Rawly Eastwick (8–4)	None	38,094	83–42
126	August 27	@ Reds	1–4	Fred Norman (12–4)	**Tom Underwood** (9–4)	Pedro Borbón (5)	49,821	83–43
127	August 28	@ Reds	7–8	Rawly Eastwick (9–4)	**Tug McGraw** (6–5)	None	51,091	83–44
128	August 29	@ Reds	5–6 (15)	Santo Alcalá (11–3)	**Jim Kaat** (11–9)	None	51,376	83–45
129	August 30	@ Astros	1–3	Dan Larson (4–5)	**Larry Christenson** (10–8)	None	5,437	83–46
130	August 31	@ Astros	2–3	J. R. Richard (16–13)	**Tug McGraw** (6–6)	None	6,881	83–47

September (15–14)

#	Date	Opponent	Score	Win	Loss	Save	Attendance	Record
131	September 1	@ Astros	0–1	Bo McLaughlin (3–2)	**Jim Kaat** (11–10)	None	6,395	83–48
132	September 3	@ Mets	0–1	Tom Seaver (11–10)	**Steve Carlton** (16–5)	None	21,174	83–49
133	September 4	@ Mets	3–7	Nino Espinosa (3–3)	**Jim Lonborg** (14–9)	Skip Lockwood (15)	16,022	83–50
134	September 5	@ Mets	3–1	**Larry Christenson** (11–8)	Mickey Lolich (7–12)	**Ron Reed** (13)	20,701	84–50
135	September 6 (1)	@ Pirates	2–6	Bruce Kison (12–8)	**Jim Kaat** (11–11)	None	see 2nd game	84–51
136	September 6 (2)	@ Pirates	1–5	Larry Demery (10–4)	**Tom Underwood** (9–5)	None	41,703	84–52
137	September 8	@ Pirates	1–6	Jim Rooker (13–7)	**Steve Carlton** (16–6)	None	30,976	84–53
138	September 9	Cubs	4–2	**Jim Lonborg** (15–9)	Bill Bonham (8–11)	None	27,194	85–53
139	September 10	Cubs	2–3	Rick Reuschel (12–10)	**Jim Kaat** (11–12)	None	30,121	85–54
140	September 11	Cubs	1–4 (12)	Bruce Sutter (5–3)	**Ron Reed** (8–5)	Joe Coleman (4)	37,668	85–55
141	September 12	Cubs	8–0	**Larry Christenson** (12–8)	Steve Renko (7–9)	**Tug McGraw** (9)	34,469	86–55
142	September 13	Expos	7–2	**Steve Carlton** (17–6)	Dennis Blair (0–1)	**Gene Garber** (9)	20,114	87–55
143	September 14	Expos	3–2	**Jim Lonborg** (16–9)	Woodie Fryman (12–11)	**Ron Reed** (14)	23,812	88–55
144	September 15	Pirates	2–7	John Candelaria (15–6)	**Jim Kaat** (11–13)	None	45,010	88–56
145	September 16	Pirates	6–7	Kent Tekulve (5–1)	**Ron Reed** (8–6)	None	35,806	88–57
146	September 17	@ Cubs	3–4 (12)	Bruce Sutter (6–3)	**Ron Reed** (8–7)	None	3,631	88–58
147	September 18	@ Cubs	4–1	**Steve Carlton** (18–6)	Rick Reuschel (13–11)	None	15,938	89–58
148	September 19	@ Cubs	0–1	Ray Burris (14–13)	**Jim Lonborg** (16–10)	None	17,764	89–59
149	September 21	Cardinals	5–1	**Tom Underwood** (10–5)	John Denny (10–8)	**Tug McGraw** (10)	20,261	90–59
150	September 22	Cardinals	9–4	**Gene Garber** (8–3)	Tom Walker (1–2)	None	27,423	91–59
151	September 23	Cardinals	7–3	**Steve Carlton** (19–6)	Eric Rasmussen (5–12)	None	29,018	92–59
152	September 24 (1)	@ Expos	9–3	**Larry Christenson** (13–8)	Steve Rogers (6–17)	**Gene Garber** (10)	see 2nd game	93–59
153	September 24 (2)	@ Expos	2–3	Don Stanhouse (9–11)	**Jim Kaat** (11–14)	None	4,510	93–60
154	September 25	@ Expos	6–5	**Wayne Twitchell** (3–1)	Woodie Fryman (13–12)	**Gene Garber** (11)	5,096	94–60
155	September 26 (1)	@ Expos	4–1	**Jim Lonborg** (17–10)	Dan Warthen (2–9)	None	see 2nd game	95–60
156	September 26 (2)	@ Expos	2–1 (7)	**Ron Schueler** (1–0)	Dennis Blair (0–2)	None	14,166	96–60
157	September 27	@ Cardinals	9–1	**Jim Kaat** (12–14)	Pete Falcone (12–15)	**Randy Lerch** (1)	6,199	97–60
158	September 28	@ Cardinals	3–5	Eric Rasmussen (6–12)	**Steve Carlton** (19–7)	None	5,793	97–61
159	September 29	@ Cardinals	6–5	**Tug McGraw** (7–6)	John Curtis (6–11)	**Wayne Twitchell** (1)	5,992	98–61

October (3–0)

#	Date	Opponent	Score	Win	Loss	Save	Attendance	Record
160	October 1	Mets	2–1	**Gene Garber** (9–3)	Jerry Koosman (21–10)	None	23,084	99–61
161	October 2	Mets	7–4	**Jim Lonborg** (18–10)	Jon Matlack (17–10)	**Tug McGraw** (11)	47,095	100–61
162	October 3	Mets	2–1	**Steve Carlton** (20–7)	Craig Swan (6–9)	None	25,632	101–61

=== Roster ===
1976 Philadelphia Phillies
**Roster**
**Pitchers**: 32 Steve Carlton; 38 Larry Christenson; 26 Gene Garber; 39 Jim Kaat; 47 Randy Lerch; 41 Jim Lonborg; 45 Tug McGraw; 42 Ron Reed; 37 Ron Schueler; 33 Wayne Twitchell; 34 Tom Underwood	**Catchers**: 5 Tim Blackwell; 8 Bob Boone; 11 Tim McCarver; 9 Bill Nahorodny; 6 Johnny Oates; **Infielders**: 15 Dick Allen; 16,5 Fred Andrews; 10 Larry Bowa; 30 Dave Cash; 17 Terry Harmon; 14 Tommy Hutton; 20 Mike Schmidt; 12 Tony Taylor; 28 Bobby Tolan; 22 John Vukovich	**Outfielders**: 29,28 Rick Bosetti; 23 Ollie Brown; 21 Jay Johnstone; 19 Greg Luzinski; 31 Garry Maddox; 25 Jerry Martin	**Manager**: 3 Danny Ozark; **Coaches**: 1 Carroll Beringer; 2 Billy DeMars; 4 Ray Rippelmeyer; 7 Bobby Wine

== Player stats ==
= Indicates team leader

= Indicates league leader

=== Batting ===
==== Starters by position ====
Note: Pos = Position; G = Games played; AB = At bats; H = Hits; Avg. = Batting average; HR = Home runs; RBI = Runs batted in

Pos	Player	G	AB	H	Avg.	HR	RBI
C	Bob Boone	121	361	98	.271	4	54
1B	Dick Allen	85	298	80	.268	15	49
2B	Dave Cash	160	666	189	.284	1	56
SS	Larry Bowa	156	624	155	.248	0	49
3B	Mike Schmidt	160	584	153	.262	38	107
LF	Greg Luzinski	149	533	162	.304	21	95
CF	Garry Maddox	146	531	175	.330	6	68
RF	Jay Johnstone	129	440	140	.318	5	53

==== Other batters ====
Note: G = Games played; AB = At bats; H = Hits; Avg. = Batting average; HR = Home runs; RBI = Runs batted in

Player	G	AB	H	Avg.	HR	RBI
Bobby Tolan	110	272	71	.261	5	35
Ollie Brown	92	209	53	.254	5	30
Tim McCarver	90	155	43	.277	3	29
Tommy Hutton	95	124	25	.202	1	13
Jerry Martin	130	121	30	.248	2	15
Johnny Oates	37	99	25	.253	0	8
Terry Harmon	42	61	18	.295	0	6
Tony Taylor	26	23	6	.261	0	3
Rick Bosetti	13	18	5	.278	0	0
John Vukovich	4	8	1	.125	1	2
Tim Blackwell	4	8	2	.250	0	1
Fred Andrews	4	6	4	.667	0	0
Bill Nahorodny	3	5	1	.200	0	0

=== Pitching ===
==== Starting pitchers ====
Note: G = Games pitched; IP = Innings pitched; W = Wins; L = Losses; ERA = Earned run average; SO = Strikeouts

Player	G	IP	W	L	ERA	SO
Steve Carlton	35	252.2	20	7	3.13	195
Jim Kaat	38	227.2	12	14	3.48	83
Jim Lonborg	33	222.0	18	10	3.08	118
Larry Christenson	32	168.2	13	8	3.68	54
Tom Underwood	33	155.2	10	5	3.53	94

==== Relief pitchers ====
Note: G = Games pitched; W = Wins; L = Losses; SV = Saves; ERA = Earned run average; SO = Strikeouts

Player	G	W	L	SV	ERA	SO
Ron Reed	59	8	7	14	2.46	96
Gene Garber	59	9	3	11	2.82	92
Tug McGraw	58	7	6	11	2.50	76
Ron Schueler	35	1	0	3	2.90	43
Wayne Twitchell	26	3	1	1	1.75	67
Randy Lerch	1	0	0	0	3.00	0

== 1976 National League Championship Series ==
=== Game 1 ===
October 9, Veterans Stadium

Team	1	2	3	4	5	6	7	8	9	R	H	E
**Cincinnati**	0	0	1	0	0	2	0	3	0	**6**	**10**	**0**
Philadelphia	1	0	0	0	0	0	0	0	2	**3**	**6**	**1**
W: Don Gullett (1–0) L: Steve Carlton (0–1) SV: None
HRs: **CIN** – George Foster (1) **PHI** – None

=== Game 2 ===
October 10, Veterans Stadium

Team	1	2	3	4	5	6	7	8	9	R	H	E
**Cincinnati**	0	0	0	0	0	4	2	0	0	**6**	**6**	**0**
Philadelphia	0	1	0	0	1	0	0	0	0	**2**	**10**	**1**
W: Pat Zachry (1–0) L: Jim Lonborg (0–1) SV: Pedro Borbón (1)
HRs: **CIN** – None **PHI** – Greg Luzinski (1)

=== Game 3 ===
October 12, Riverfront Stadium

Team	1	2	3	4	5	6	7	8	9	R	H	E
Philadelphia	0	0	0	1	0	0	2	2	1	**6**	**11**	**0**
**Cincinnati**	0	0	0	0	0	0	4	0	3	**7**	**9**	**2**
W: Rawly Eastwick (1–0) L: Gene Garber (0–1) SV: None
HRs: **CIN** – George Foster (2) Johnny Bench (1) **PHI** – None

=== Postseason game log ===
Legend
	Phillies win
	Phillies loss
	Postponement
**Bold**	Phillies team member

1976 Postseason Game Log
Overall Record: 0–3
National League Championship Series (0–3)

#	Date	Opponent	Score	Win	Loss	Save	Attendance	Record
1	October 9	Reds	3–6	Don Gullett (1–0)	**Steve Carlton** (0–1)	None	62,640	0–1
2	October 10	Reds	2–6	Pat Zachry (1–0)	**Jim Lonborg** (0–1)	Pedro Borbón (1)	62,651	0–2
3	October 12	@ Reds	6–7	Rawly Eastwick (1–0)	**Gene Garber** (0–1)	None	55,047	0–3

== Awards and honors ==
All-Star Game

- Greg Luzinski, Starter
- Bob Boone, Reserve
- Dave Cash, Reserve
- Mike Schmidt, Reserve
- Larry Bowa, Reserve

== Farm system ==
Level	Team	League	Manager
AAA	Oklahoma City 89ers	American Association	Jim Bunning
AA	Reading Phillies	Eastern League	Bob Wellman and Granny Hamner
A	Peninsula Pilots	Carolina League	Cal Emery
A	Spartanburg Phillies	Western Carolinas League	Lee Elia
A-Short Season	Auburn Phillies	New York–Penn League	Mike Compton
