= 1976 St. Louis Cardinals season =

Major League Baseball season

1976 St. Louis Cardinals
- League: National League
- Division: East
- Ballpark: Busch Memorial Stadium
- City: St. Louis, Missouri
- Record: 72–90 (.444)
- Divisional place: 5th
- Owners: August "Gussie" Busch
- General managers: Bing Devine
- Managers: Red Schoendienst
- Television: KSD-TV (Mike Shannon, Jay Randolph, Bob Starr)
- Radio: KMOX (Jack Buck, Mike Shannon, Bob Starr)

The 1976 St. Louis Cardinals season was the team's 95th season in St. Louis, Missouri and the 85th season in the National League. The Cardinals went 72–90 during the season and finished fifth in the National League East, 29 games behind the Philadelphia Phillies.

== Offseason ==
- October 28, 1975: Mike Garman and a player to be named later were traded by the Cardinals to the Chicago Cubs for Don Kessinger. The Cardinals sent completed the deal by sending Bobby Hrapmann (minors) to the Cubs on April 5, 1976.
- December 12, 1975: Buddy Bradford and Greg Terlecky were traded by the Cardinals to the Chicago White Sox for Lee Richard.
- December 22, 1975, Mick Kelleher was traded by the Cardinals to the Chicago Cubs for Vic Harris.
- January 7, 1976: John Butcher was drafted by the Cardinals in the 2nd round of the 1976 Major League Baseball draft, but did not sign.
- February 3, 1976: Tom Walker was purchased by the Cardinals from the Detroit Tigers.
- March 2, 1976: Ted Sizemore was traded by the Cardinals to the Los Angeles Dodgers for Willie Crawford.

== Regular season ==
This was the twelfth and final season for Red Schoendienst as the Cardinals' full-time manager, although he would manage the club in parts of two later seasons (1980 and 1990).

The Cardinals went to the Columbia blue road uniforms for the first time in '76. They would continue to wear those uniforms through the 1984 season.

=== Season standings ===
NL East
Team	W	L	Pct.	GB	Home	Road
Philadelphia Phillies	101	61	.623	—	53‍–‍28	48‍–‍33
Pittsburgh Pirates	92	70	.568	9	47‍–‍34	45‍–‍36
New York Mets	86	76	.531	15	45‍–‍37	41‍–‍39
Chicago Cubs	75	87	.463	26	42‍–‍39	33‍–‍48
St. Louis Cardinals	72	90	.444	29	37‍–‍44	35‍–‍46
Montreal Expos	55	107	.340	46	27‍–‍53	28‍–‍54

=== Record vs. opponents ===
1976 National League record Sources:
Team	ATL	CHC	CIN	HOU	LAD	MON	NYM	PHI	PIT	SD	SF	STL
Atlanta	—	6–6	6–12	7–11	8–10	8–4	4–8	5–7	3–9	10–8	9–9	4–8
Chicago	6–6	—	3–9	5–7	3–9	11–7	5–13	8–10	8–10	6–6	8–4	12–6
Cincinnati	12–6	9–3	—	12–6	13–5	9–3	6–6	5–7	8–4	13–5	9–9	6–6
Houston	11–7	7–5	6–12	—	5–13	10–2	6–6	4–8	2–10	10–8	10–8	9–3
Los Angeles	10–8	9–3	5–13	13–5	—	10–2	7–5	5–7	9–3	6–12	8–10	10–2
Montreal	4–8	7–11	3–9	2–10	2–10	—	8–10	3–15	8–10	4–8	7–5	7–11
New York	8–4	13–5	6–6	6–6	5–7	10–8	—	5–13	10–8	7–5	7–5	9–9
Philadelphia	7-5	10–8	7–5	8–4	7–5	15–3	13–5	—	8–10	8–4	6–6	12–6
Pittsburgh	9–3	10–8	4–8	10–2	3–9	10–8	8–10	10–8	—	7–5	9–3	12–6
San Diego	8–10	6–6	5–13	8–10	12–6	8–4	5–7	4–8	5–7	—	8–10	4–8
San Francisco	9–9	4–8	9–9	8–10	10–8	5–7	5–7	6–6	3–9	10–8	—	5–7
St. Louis	8–4	6–12	6–6	3–9	2–10	11–7	9–9	6–12	6–12	8–4	7–5	—

=== Notable transactions ===
- April 9, 1976: Wayne Nordhagen was purchased from the Cardinals by the Philadelphia Phillies.
- May 19, 1976: Luis Meléndez was traded by the Cardinals to the San Diego Padres for Bill Greif.
- June 8, 1976: John Littlefield was drafted by the Cardinals in the 30th round of the 1976 Major League Baseball draft.

=== Roster ===
1976 St. Louis Cardinals
Roster
Pitchers: 26 Doug Capilla; 22 John Curtis; 36 John Denny; 41 Pete Falcone; 31 Bob Forsch; 34 Danny Frisella; 38 Bill Greif; 39 Al Hrabosky; 44 Lerrin LaGrow; 47 Lynn McGlothen; 46 Mike Proly; 42 Eric Rasmussen; 24 Eddie Solomon; 34 Tom Walker; 32 Mike Wallace; 48 Steve Waterbury	Catchers: 13 Joe Ferguson; 9 Ken Rudolph; 23 Ted Simmons; 12 John Tamargo; Infielders: 14 Luis Alvarado; 16 Doug Clarey; 25 Héctor Cruz; 15 Ron Fairly; 4 Vic Harris; 37 Keith Hernandez; 11 Don Kessinger; 3 Lee Richard; 7 Reggie Smith; 19 Garry Templeton; 10 Mike Tyson	Outfielders: 27 Mike Anderson; 20 Lou Brock; 28 Charlie Chant; 5 Willie Crawford; 21 Bake McBride; 7 Sam Mejías; 26 Luis Meléndez; 29 Jerry Mumphrey; 40 Mike Potter	Manager: 2 Red Schoendienst; Coaches: 18 Preston Gómez; 8 Fred Koenig; 30 Johnny Lewis; 33 Bob Milliken

== Player stats ==
= Indicates team leader

Y

=== Batting ===
==== Starters by position ====
Note: Pos = Position; G = Games played; AB = At bats; H = Hits; Avg. = Batting average; HR = Home runs; RBI = Runs batted in

Pos	Player	G	AB	H	Avg.	HR	RBI
C	Ted Simmons	150	546	159	.291	5	75
1B	Keith Hernandez	129	374	108	.289	7	46
2B	Mike Tyson	76	245	70	.286	3	28
3B	Héctor Cruz	151	526	120	.228	13	71
SS	Don Kessinger	145	502	120	.239	1	40
LF	Lou Brock	133	498	150	.301	4	67
CF	Jerry Mumphrey	112	384	99	.258	1	26
RF	Willie Crawford	120	392	119	.304	9	50

==== Other batters ====
Note: G = Games played; AB = At bats; H = Hits; Avg. = Batting average; HR = Home runs; RBI = Runs batted in

Player	G	AB	H	Avg.	HR	RBI
Bake McBride	72	272	91	.335	3	24
Vic Harris	97	259	59	.228	1	19
Garry Templeton	53	213	62	.291	1	17
Mike Anderson	86	199	58	.291	1	12
Joe Ferguson	71	189	38	.201	4	21
Reggie Smith	47	170	37	.218	8	23
Ron Fairly	73	110	29	.264	0	21
Lee Richard	66	91	16	.176	0	5
Ken Rudolph	27	50	8	.160	0	5
Luis Alvarado	16	42	12	.286	0	3
Luis Meléndez	20	24	3	.125	0	0
Sam Mejías	18	21	3	.143	0	0
Mike Potter	9	16	0	.000	0	0
Charlie Chant	15	14	2	.143	0	0
John Tamargo	10	10	3	.300	0	1
Doug Clarey	9	4	1	.250	1	2

=== Pitching ===
= Indicates league leader

==== Starting pitchers ====
Note: G = Games pitched; IP = Innings pitched; W = Wins; L = Losses; ERA = Earned run average; SO = Strikeouts

Player	G	IP	W	L	ERA	SO
Pete Falcone	32	212.0	12	16	3.23	138
John Denny	30	207.0	11	9	2.52	74
Lynn McGlothen	33	205.0	13	15	3.91	106
Bob Forsch	33	194.0	8	10	3.94	76

==== Other pitchers ====
Note: G = Games pitched; IP = Innings pitched; W = Wins; L = Losses; ERA = Earned run average; SO = Strikeouts

Player	G	IP	W	L	ERA	SO
Eric Rasmussen	43	150.1	6	12	3.53	76
John Curtis	37	134.0	6	11	4.50	52
Lerrin LaGrow	8	24.1	0	1	1.48	10

==== Relief pitchers ====
Note: G = Games pitched; W = Wins; L = Losses; SV = Saves; ERA = Earned run average; SO = Strikeouts

Player	G	W	L	SV	ERA	SO
Al Hrabosky	68	8	6	13	3.30	73
Mike Wallace	49	3	2	2	4.07	40
Bill Greif	47	1	5	6	4.12	32
Eddie Solomon	26	1	1	0	4.86	19
Danny Frisella	18	0	0	1	3.97	11
Mike Proly	14	1	0	0	3.71	4
Tom Walker	10	1	2	3	4.12	11
Doug Capilla	7	1	0	0	5.40	5
Steve Waterbury	5	0	0	0	6.00	4

== Farm system ==
Level	Team	League	Manager
AAA	Tulsa Oilers	American Association	Ken Boyer
AA	Arkansas Travelers	Texas League	Jack Krol
A	St. Petersburg Cardinals	Florida State League	Hal Lanier
Rookie	Johnson City Cardinals	Appalachian League	Buzzy Keller
Rookie	GCL Cardinals	Gulf Coast League	Dave Ricketts

LEAGUE CHAMPIONS: Johnson City
