= 1976 San Francisco Giants season =

1976 San Francisco Giants
- League: National League
- Division: West
- Ballpark: Candlestick Park
- City: San Francisco, California
- Owners: Horace Stoneham and Bob Lurie
- General managers: Spec Richardson
- Managers: Bill Rigney
- Television: KTVU (Al Michaels, Gary Park)
- Radio: KSFO (Al Michaels, Lon Simmons)

The 1976 San Francisco Giants season was the Giants' 94th season in Major League Baseball, their 19th season in San Francisco since their move from New York following the 1957 season, and their 17th at Candlestick Park. The team finished in fourth place in the National League West with a 74–88 record, 28 games behind the Cincinnati Reds.

== Offseason ==
=== Team movement discussion ===
During the first half of the 1970s, attendance at cold and windy Candlestick Park plummeted, and Giants owner Horace Stoneham had faced financial hardship. Finally, in 1976, he put the team up for sale. In January 1976, Stoneham agreed to sell the team for $13.25 million to a Toronto group consisting of Labatt's Breweries of Canada, Ltd., Vulcan Assets Ltd., and Canadian Imperial Bank of Commerce. The team would begin play with the 1976 season at Toronto's Exhibition Stadium and be called the Giants. In addition, it was briefly rumored they considered a return to the New York metropolitan area, perhaps to a new baseball stadium in the New Jersey Meadowlands. Instead, Bob Lurie led a group to buy the Giants from Horace Stoneham for $8 million.

=== Notable transactions ===
- January 7, 1976: Dennis Littlejohn was drafted by the Giants in the 1st round (2nd pick) of the 1976 Major League Baseball draft (secondary phase).

== Regular season ==
=== Opening Day starters ===
- Von Joshua
- Gary Matthews
- Willie Montañez
- John Montefusco
- Bobby Murcer
- Dave Rader
- Ken Reitz
- Chris Speier
- Derrel Thomas

=== Season standings ===
NL West
Team	W	L	Pct.	GB	Home	Road
Cincinnati Reds	102	60	.630	—	49‍–‍32	53‍–‍28
Los Angeles Dodgers	92	70	.568	10	49‍–‍32	43‍–‍38
Houston Astros	80	82	.494	22	46‍–‍36	34‍–‍46
San Francisco Giants	74	88	.457	28	40‍–‍41	34‍–‍47
San Diego Padres	73	89	.451	29	42‍–‍38	31‍–‍51
Atlanta Braves	70	92	.432	32	34‍–‍47	36‍–‍45

=== Record vs. opponents ===
1976 National League record Sources:
Team	ATL	CHC	CIN	HOU	LAD	MON	NYM	PHI	PIT	SD	SF	STL
Atlanta	—	6–6	6–12	7–11	8–10	8–4	4–8	5–7	3–9	10–8	9–9	4–8
Chicago	6–6	—	3–9	5–7	3–9	11–7	5–13	8–10	8–10	6–6	8–4	12–6
Cincinnati	12–6	9–3	—	12–6	13–5	9–3	6–6	5–7	8–4	13–5	9–9	6–6
Houston	11–7	7–5	6–12	—	5–13	10–2	6–6	4–8	2–10	10–8	10–8	9–3
Los Angeles	10–8	9–3	5–13	13–5	—	10–2	7–5	5–7	9–3	6–12	8–10	10–2
Montreal	4–8	7–11	3–9	2–10	2–10	—	8–10	3–15	8–10	4–8	7–5	7–11
New York	8–4	13–5	6–6	6–6	5–7	10–8	—	5–13	10–8	7–5	7–5	9–9
Philadelphia	7-5	10–8	7–5	8–4	7–5	15–3	13–5	—	8–10	8–4	6–6	12–6
Pittsburgh	9–3	10–8	4–8	10–2	3–9	10–8	8–10	10–8	—	7–5	9–3	12–6
San Diego	8–10	6–6	5–13	8–10	12–6	8–4	5–7	4–8	5–7	—	8–10	4–8
San Francisco	9–9	4–8	9–9	8–10	10–8	5–7	5–7	6–6	3–9	10–8	—	5–7
St. Louis	8–4	6–12	6–6	3–9	2–10	11–7	9–9	6–12	6–12	8–4	7–5	—

=== Notable transactions ===
- June 2, 1976: Von Joshua was purchased from the Giants by the Milwaukee Brewers.
- June 13, 1976: Willie Montañez, Craig Robinson, Mike Eden, and Jake Brown were traded by the Giants to the Atlanta Braves for Darrell Evans and Marty Perez.
- June 14, 1976: Joe Strain was signed as an amateur free agent by the Giants.
- June 21, 1976: Casey Parsons was signed as an amateur free agent by the Giants.
- September 3, 1976: Randy Elliott was signed as a free agent by the Giants.

==== Draft picks ====
- June 8, 1976: Jeff Stember was drafted by the Giants in the 26th round of the 1976 Major League Baseball draft.

=== Roster ===
1976 San Francisco Giants
Roster
Pitchers: 33 Jim Barr; 37 Mike Caldwell; 34 John D'Acquisto; 25 Rob Dressler; 28 Ed Halicki; 60 Dave Heaverlo; 39 Bob Knepper; 46 Gary Lavelle; 41 Greg Minton; 17 Randy Moffitt; 26 John Montefusco; 45 Frank Riccelli; 51 Tommy Toms; 49 Charlie Williams	Catchers: 58 Gary Alexander; 2 Marc Hill; 14 Dave Rader; 3 Mike Sadek; Infielders: 15 Chris Arnold; 41 Darrell Evans; 10 Johnnie LeMaster; 29 Bruce Miller; 22 Willie Montañez; 16 Steve Ontiveros; 1 Marty Perez; 21 Ken Reitz; 1 Craig Robinson; 35 Chris Speier; 30 Derrel Thomas	Outfielders: 43 Glenn Adams; 22 Jack Clark; 31 Larry Herndon; 19 Von Joshua; 36 Gary Matthews; 20 Bobby Murcer; 12 Gary Thomasson	Manager: 18 Bill Rigney; Coaches: 9 Jim Davenport; 56 Frank Funk; 8 Buck Rodgers; 5 Bobby Winkles

== Player stats ==
= Indicates team leader

=== Batting ===
==== Starters by position ====
Note: Pos = Position; G = Games played; AB = At bats; H = Hits; Avg. = Batting average; HR = Home runs; RBI = Runs batted in

Pos	Player	G	AB	H	Avg.	HR	RBI
C	Dave Rader	88	255	67	.263	1	22
1B	Darrell Evans	92	257	57	.222	10	36
2B	Marty Perez	93	332	86	.259	2	26
3B	Ken Reitz	155	577	154	.267	5	66
SS	Chris Speier	145	495	112	.226	3	40
LF	Gary Matthews	156	587	164	.279	20	84
CF	Larry Herndon	115	337	97	.288	2	23
RF	Bobby Murcer	147	533	138	.259	23	90

==== Other batters ====
Note: G = Games played; AB = At bats; H = Hits; Avg. = Batting average; HR = Home runs; RBI = Runs batted in

Player	G	AB	H	Avg.	HR	RBI
Gary Thomasson	103	328	85	.259	8	38
Derrel Thomas	81	272	63	.232	2	19
Willie Montañez	60	230	71	.309	2	20
Von Joshua	42	156	41	.263	0	2
Marc Hill	54	131	24	.183	3	15
Jack Clark	26	102	23	.225	2	10
Johnnie LeMaster	33	100	21	.210	0	9
Mike Sadek	55	93	19	.204	0	7
Glenn Adams	69	74	18	.243	0	3
Steve Ontiveros	59	74	13	.176	0	5
Gary Alexander	23	73	13	.178	2	7
Chris Arnold	60	69	15	.217	0	5
Bruce Miller	12	25	4	.160	0	2
Craig Robinson	15	13	4	.308	0	2

=== Pitching ===
==== Starting pitchers ====
Note: G = Games pitched; IP = Innings pitched; W = Wins; L = Losses; ERA = Earned run average; SO = Strikeouts

Player	G	IP	W	L	ERA	SO
John Montefusco	37	253.1	16	14	2.84	172
Jim Barr	37	252.1	15	12	2.89	75
Ed Halicki	32	186.1	12	14	3.62	130
Rob Dressler	25	107.2	3	10	4.43	33
John D'Acquisto	28	106.0	3	8	5.35	53
Bob Knepper	4	25.0	1	2	3.24	11
Frank Riccelli	4	16.0	1	1	5.63	11

==== Other pitchers ====
Note: G = Games pitched; IP = Innings pitched; W = Wins; L = Losses; ERA = Earned run average; SO = Strikeouts

Player	G	IP	W	L	ERA	SO
Mike Caldwell	50	107.1	1	7	4.86	55
Greg Minton	10	25.2	0	3	4.91	7

==== Relief pitchers ====
Note: G = Games pitched; W = Wins; L = Losses; SV = Saves; ERA = Earned run average; SO = Strikeouts

Player	G	W	L	SV	ERA	SO
Randy Moffitt	58	6	6	14	2.27	50
Gary Lavelle	65	10	6	12	2.69	71
Dave Heaverlo	61	4	4	1	4.44	40
Charlie Williams	48	2	0	1	2.96	34
Tommy Toms	7	0	1	1	6.23	4

== Award winners ==
All-Star Game

- John Montefusco, reserve

== Farm system ==
Level	Team	League	Manager
AAA	Phoenix Giants	Pacific Coast League	Rocky Bridges
AA	Lafayette Drillers	Texas League	John VanOrnum
A	Fresno Giants	California League	Andy Gilbert
A	Cedar Rapids Giants	Midwest League	Salty Parker
Rookie	Great Falls Giants	Pioneer League	Ernie Rodriguez

LEAGUE CHAMPIONS: Great Falls
