= 1976 Atlanta Braves season =

1976 Atlanta Braves
- League: National League
- Division: West
- Ballpark: Atlanta–Fulton County Stadium
- City: Atlanta
- Record: 70–92 (.432)
- Divisional place: 6th
- Owners: Ted Turner
- General managers: Eddie Robinson, John Alevizos, Bill Lucas
- Managers: Dave Bristol
- Television: WTCG (Ernie Johnson, Pete Van Wieren, Skip Caray)
- Radio: WSB (Ernie Johnson, Pete Van Wieren)

The 1976 Atlanta Braves season was the 11th season in Atlanta along with the franchise's 106th consecutive year of existence in American professional baseball. The Braves finished in sixth and last place in the National League West Division, compiling a 70–92 (.432) win–loss record; although the 70 victories represented a three-game improvement over the fifth-place 1975 edition, the last-place finish would be the first of four straight years in the NL West divisional basement. The club drew 818,179 fans to Atlanta Stadium, a 53 percent increase over its dismal 1975 attendance of less than 535,000 fans.

== Offseason ==
- November 17, 1975: Dusty Baker and Ed Goodson were traded by the Braves to the Los Angeles Dodgers for Jerry Royster, Lee Lacy, Tom Paciorek, and Jimmy Wynn.
- December 12, 1975: Larvell Blanks and Ralph Garr were traded by the Braves to the Chicago White Sox for Ken Henderson, Ozzie Osborn and Dick Ruthven.

== Ownership and management: the Ted Turner era begins ==
On January 7, 1976, the modern era of the Braves franchise effectively began when Atlanta broadcast executive and world-class yachtsman Ted Turner bought 100 percent of the team from the Atlanta LaSalle Corp. for $10 million. The previous ownership group, the LaSalle Corp., had owned the team since October 1962 and spearheaded its move from Milwaukee to Atlanta in time for the 1966 season; its chairman, William Bartholomay, retained his association with the Turner-owned Braves as chairman of the board. Early reports speculated that Turner bought the Braves to provide local programming content for his television station, then WTCG-TV, Channel 17. But Turner would become a highly successful baseball executive and turn WTCG into the WTBS Superstation and a cornerstone of the Turner Broadcasting System.

Turner wasted no time in making headlines and major changes in the Braves' front office. On April 11, 1976, he signed one of baseball's first free agents, starting pitcher Andy Messersmith, who had successfully sued baseball and brought about the end of the reserve clause, for a contract valued at more than $1 million. Messersmith, a 19-game-winner for the 1975 Dodgers, was initially issued a uniform bearing the numeral 17 but the word "Channel" instead of his nameplate above it, promoting Turner's WTCG outlet. He made the NL All-Star team that season, his most successful as a Brave, and was one of the few bright spots in a 92-loss, last-place season. The team's field manager, Dave Bristol, hired by the previous owners three months before the sale, survived the 1976 season—but he would be involved in a bizarre firing-and-rehiring by Turner during the 1977 campaign.

Turner also employed three general_managers in 1976. In May, he replaced veteran baseball man Eddie Robinson, inherited from the previous regime and in office for almost four full years, with former Boston Red Sox executive John Alevizos. But Alevizos lasted only four months before he was removed in favor of Braves' farm system director Bill Lucas, who became the first African-American general manager in Major League history on September 17. Lucas, the former brother-in-law of Braves' legend Henry Aaron, would begin the rebuilding of the franchise into a competitor, but he died suddenly at age 43 from a cerebral hemorrhage in 1979, the year before the Braves finally cracked the .500 mark.

Led by players including Dale Murphy and Bob Horner, the Braves won the National League West division in 1982 but declined during the remainder of the decade. Under executives including Bobby Cox, Stan Kasten and John Schuerholz, the team became a regular contender during the 1990s. The Braves won division titles in 1991–1993 and 1995–1996, National League pennants in 1991, 1992, 1995 and 1996, and the 1995 World Series. Turner sold the team to Time Warner in 1996.

== Regular season ==
=== Season standings ===
NL West
Team	W	L	Pct.	GB	Home	Road
Cincinnati Reds	102	60	.630	—	49‍–‍32	53‍–‍28
Los Angeles Dodgers	92	70	.568	10	49‍–‍32	43‍–‍38
Houston Astros	80	82	.494	22	46‍–‍36	34‍–‍46
San Francisco Giants	74	88	.457	28	40‍–‍41	34‍–‍47
San Diego Padres	73	89	.451	29	42‍–‍38	31‍–‍51
Atlanta Braves	70	92	.432	32	34‍–‍47	36‍–‍45

=== Record vs. opponents ===
1976 National League record Sources:
Team	ATL	CHC	CIN	HOU	LAD	MON	NYM	PHI	PIT	SD	SF	STL
Atlanta	—	6–6	6–12	7–11	8–10	8–4	4–8	5–7	3–9	10–8	9–9	4–8
Chicago	6–6	—	3–9	5–7	3–9	11–7	5–13	8–10	8–10	6–6	8–4	12–6
Cincinnati	12–6	9–3	—	12–6	13–5	9–3	6–6	5–7	8–4	13–5	9–9	6–6
Houston	11–7	7–5	6–12	—	5–13	10–2	6–6	4–8	2–10	10–8	10–8	9–3
Los Angeles	10–8	9–3	5–13	13–5	—	10–2	7–5	5–7	9–3	6–12	8–10	10–2
Montreal	4–8	7–11	3–9	2–10	2–10	—	8–10	3–15	8–10	4–8	7–5	7–11
New York	8–4	13–5	6–6	6–6	5–7	10–8	—	5–13	10–8	7–5	7–5	9–9
Philadelphia	7-5	10–8	7–5	8–4	7–5	15–3	13–5	—	8–10	8–4	6–6	12–6
Pittsburgh	9–3	10–8	4–8	10–2	3–9	10–8	8–10	10–8	—	7–5	9–3	12–6
San Diego	8–10	6–6	5–13	8–10	12–6	8–4	5–7	4–8	5–7	—	8–10	4–8
San Francisco	9–9	4–8	9–9	8–10	10–8	5–7	5–7	6–6	3–9	10–8	—	5–7
St. Louis	8–4	6–12	6–6	3–9	2–10	11–7	9–9	6–12	6–12	8–4	7–5	—

=== Notable transactions ===
- June 8, 1976: 1976 Major League Baseball draft
  - Ricky Jones was drafted by the Braves in the 18th round, but did not sign.
  - John Butcher was drafted by the Braves in the 3rd round of the secondary phase, but did not sign.
- June 13, 1976: Darrell Evans and Marty Perez were traded by the Braves to the San Francisco Giants for Willie Montañez, Craig Robinson, Mike Eden, and Jake Brown.
- June 15, 1976: Blue Moon Odom was traded by the Braves to the Chicago White Sox for Pete Varney.
- June 23, 1976: Elías Sosa and Lee Lacy were traded by the Braves to the Los Angeles Dodgers for Mike Marshall.

=== Roster ===
1976 Atlanta Braves
Roster
Pitchers: 38 Al Autry; 27 Mike Beard; 33 Rick Camp; 47 Buzz Capra; 30 Bruce Dal Canton; 36 Adrian Devine; 45 Jamie Easterly; 50 Preston Hanna; 26 Frank LaCorte; 31 Max León; 20 Mike Marshall; 17 Andy Messersmith; 14 Roger Moret; 49 Carl Morton; 35 Phil Niekro; 40 Dick Ruthven; 38 Elías Sosa; 28 Pablo Torrealba	Catchers: 29 Vic Correll; 3 Dale Murphy; 42 Biff Pocoroba; 32 Pete Varney; 32 Earl Williams; Infielders: 10 Rob Belloir; 15 Darrel Chaney; 9 Mike Eden; 11 Darrell Evans; 19 Rod Gilbreath; 34 Lee Lacy; 25 Willie Montañez; 48 Junior Moore; 9 Marty Perez; 10 Craig Robinson; 34 Pat Rockett; 4 Jerry Royster	Outfielders: 18 Brian Asselstine; 43 Cito Gaston; 7 Ken Henderson; 27 Dave May; 22 Rowland Office; 12 Tom Paciorek; 24 Jimmy Wynn; Other batters: 18 Terry Crowley	Manager: 1 Dave Bristol; Coaches: 8 Vern Benson; 6 Chris Cannizzaro; 5 Eddie Haas; 23 Herm Starrette

== Player stats ==
=== Batting ===
==== Starters by position ====
Note: Pos = Position; G = Games played; AB = At bats; H = Hits; Avg. = Batting average; HR = Home runs; RBI = Runs batted in

Pos	Player	G	AB	H	Avg.	HR	RBI
C	Vic Correll	65	200	45	.225	5	16
1B	Willie Montañez	103	420	135	.321	9	64
2B	Rod Gilbreath	116	383	96	.251	1	32
SS	Darrel Chaney	153	496	125	.252	1	50
3B	Jerry Royster	149	533	132	.248	5	45
LF	Jimmy Wynn	148	449	93	.207	17	66
CF	Rowland Office	99	359	101	.281	4	34
RF	Ken Henderson	133	435	114	.262	13	61

==== Other batters ====
Note: G = Games played; AB = At bats; H = Hits; Avg. = Batting average; HR = Home runs; RBI = Runs batted in

Player	G	AB	H	Avg.	HR	RBI
Tom Paciorek	111	324	94	.290	4	36
Dave May	105	214	46	.215	3	23
Earl Williams	61	184	39	.212	9	26
Lee Lacy	50	180	49	.272	3	20
Biff Pocoroba	54	174	42	.241	0	14
Darrell Evans	44	139	24	.173	1	10
Cito Gaston	69	134	39	.291	4	25
Marty Perez	31	96	24	.250	1	6
Dale Murphy	19	65	17	.262	0	9
Rob Belloir	30	60	12	.200	0	4
Brian Asselstine	11	33	7	.212	1	3
Junior Moore	20	26	7	.269	0	2
Craig Robinson	15	17	4	.235	0	3
Pete Varney	5	10	1	.100	0	0
Mike Eden	5	8	0	.000	0	1
Terry Crowley	7	6	0	.000	0	1
Pat Rockett	4	5	1	.200	0	0

=== Pitching ===
==== Starting pitchers ====
Note: G = Games pitched; IP = Innings pitched; W = Wins; L = Losses; ERA = Earned run average; SO = Strikeouts

Player	G	IP	W	L	ERA	SO
Phil Niekro	38	270.2	17	11	3.29	173
Dick Ruthven	36	240.1	14	17	4.19	142
Andy Messersmith	29	207.1	11	11	3.04	135
Carl Morton	26	140.1	4	9	4.17	42
Frank LaCorte	19	105.1	3	12	4.70	79
Jamie Easterly	4	22.0	1	1	4.91	11
Al Autry	1	5.0	1	0	5.40	3

==== Other pitchers ====
Note: G = Games pitched; IP = Innings pitched; W = Wins; L = Losses; ERA = Earned run average; SO = Strikeouts

Player	G	IP	W	L	ERA	SO
Roger Moret	27	77.1	3	5	5.00	30
Rick Camp	5	11.1	0	1	6.35	6

==== Relief pitchers ====
Note: G = Games pitched; W = Wins; L = Losses; SV = Saves; ERA = Earned run average; SO = Strikeouts

Player	G	W	L	SV	ERA	SO
Adrian Devine	48	5	6	9	3.21	48
Bruce Dal Canton	42	3	5	1	3.56	36
Pablo Torrealba	36	0	2	2	3.57	33
Max León	30	2	4	3	2.75	16
Mike Beard	30	0	2	1	4.28	8
Mike Marshall	24	2	1	6	3.19	17
Elías Sosa	21	4	4	3	5.35	32
Buzz Capra	5	0	1	0	8.68	4
Preston Hanna	5	0	0	0	4.50	3

== Farm system ==
Level	Team	League	Manager
AAA	Richmond Braves	International League	Jack McKeon
AA	Savannah Braves	Southern League	Tommie Aaron
A	Greenwood Braves	Western Carolinas League	Gene Hassell
Rookie	Kingsport Braves	Appalachian League	Bobby Dews
Rookie	GCL Braves	Gulf Coast League	Chuck Goggin and Pedro González

LEAGUE CHAMPIONS: Greenwood
