= 1976 Pittsburgh Pirates season =

1976 Pittsburgh Pirates
- League: National League
- Division: East
- Ballpark: Three Rivers Stadium
- City: Pittsburgh, Pennsylvania
- Record: 92–70 (.568)
- Divisional place: 2nd
- Owners: John W. Galbreath (majority shareholder); Bing Crosby, Thomas P. Johnson (minority shareholders)
- General managers: Joe L. Brown, Harding "Pete" Peterson
- Managers: Danny Murtaugh
- Television: KDKA-TV; Milo Hamilton, Lanny Frattare
- Radio: KDKA; Milo Hamilton, Lanny Frattare

The 1976 Pittsburgh Pirates season was the 90th in the National League, and the 95th in franchise history. The Pirates compiled a 92–70 record during the season, as they finished in second place in the National League East, nine games behind their cross-state rivals, the Philadelphia Phillies. As a result, their run of five division titles in a six-year span came to an end. It was also the final season for Danny Murtaugh as the Pirates' manager.

== Offseason ==
- December 4, 1975: Rafael Vásquez was signed as an amateur free agent by the Pirates.
- December 11, 1975: Dock Ellis, Ken Brett and Willie Randolph were traded by the Pirates to the New York Yankees for Doc Medich.
- January 27, 1976: Pascual Pérez was signed as an amateur free agent by the Pirates.

== Regular season ==
- August 9, 1976: John Candelaria pitched a no-hitter against the Los Angeles Dodgers.

=== Season standings ===
NL East
Team	W	L	Pct.	GB	Home	Road
Philadelphia Phillies	101	61	.623	—	53‍–‍28	48‍–‍33
Pittsburgh Pirates	92	70	.568	9	47‍–‍34	45‍–‍36
New York Mets	86	76	.531	15	45‍–‍37	41‍–‍39
Chicago Cubs	75	87	.463	26	42‍–‍39	33‍–‍48
St. Louis Cardinals	72	90	.444	29	37‍–‍44	35‍–‍46
Montreal Expos	55	107	.340	46	27‍–‍53	28‍–‍54

=== Record vs. opponents ===
1976 National League record Sources:
Team	ATL	CHC	CIN	HOU	LAD	MON	NYM	PHI	PIT	SD	SF	STL
Atlanta	—	6–6	6–12	7–11	8–10	8–4	4–8	5–7	3–9	10–8	9–9	4–8
Chicago	6–6	—	3–9	5–7	3–9	11–7	5–13	8–10	8–10	6–6	8–4	12–6
Cincinnati	12–6	9–3	—	12–6	13–5	9–3	6–6	5–7	8–4	13–5	9–9	6–6
Houston	11–7	7–5	6–12	—	5–13	10–2	6–6	4–8	2–10	10–8	10–8	9–3
Los Angeles	10–8	9–3	5–13	13–5	—	10–2	7–5	5–7	9–3	6–12	8–10	10–2
Montreal	4–8	7–11	3–9	2–10	2–10	—	8–10	3–15	8–10	4–8	7–5	7–11
New York	8–4	13–5	6–6	6–6	5–7	10–8	—	5–13	10–8	7–5	7–5	9–9
Philadelphia	7-5	10–8	7–5	8–4	7–5	15–3	13–5	—	8–10	8–4	6–6	12–6
Pittsburgh	9–3	10–8	4–8	10–2	3–9	10–8	8–10	10–8	—	7–5	9–3	12–6
San Diego	8–10	6–6	5–13	8–10	12–6	8–4	5–7	4–8	5–7	—	8–10	4–8
San Francisco	9–9	4–8	9–9	8–10	10–8	5–7	5–7	6–6	3–9	10–8	—	5–7
St. Louis	8–4	6–12	6–6	3–9	2–10	11–7	9–9	6–12	6–12	8–4	7–5	—

=== Game log ===
1976 Game Log: 92–70 (Home: 47–34; Away: 45–36)
April: 8–8 (Home: 4–3; Away: 4–5)

#	Date	Opponent	Score	Win	Loss	Save	Attendance	Record
1	April 10	@ Phillies	5–4 (11)	**Demery** (1–0)	McGraw	—	42,147	1–0
2	April 11	@ Phillies	8–3	**Kison** (1–0)	Carlton	**Moose** (1)	18,373	2–0
3	April 13	Cardinals	14–4	**Reuss** (1–0)	Falcone	—	40,937	3–0
4	April 15	Cardinals	9–3	**Rooker** (1–0)	McGlothen	**Hernandez** (1)	9,490	4–0
5	April 16	Mets	3–1	**Medich** (1–0)	Lolich	—	19,899	5–0
6	April 17	Mets	1–17	Koosman	**Kison** (1–1)	—	13,082	5–1
7	April 18	Mets	7–5	**Reuss** (2–0)	Swan	**Hernandez** (2)	9,106	6–1
8	April 20	Phillies	1–5	Kaat	**Candelaria** (0–1)	—	8,800	6–2
9	April 21	Phillies	0–3	Underwood	**Medich** (1–1)	McGraw	9,175	6–3
10	April 23	@ Giants	3–7	Montefusco	**Reuss** (2–1)	Lavelle	15,621	6–4
11	April 24	@ Giants	1–3	Halicki	**Rooker** (1–1)	Lavelle	9,222	6–5
12	April 25	@ Giants	3–0	**Candelaria** (1–1)	Caldwell	—	23,700	7–5
13	April 26	@ Dodgers	1–7	John	**Medich** (1–2)	—	23,374	7–6
14	April 27	@ Dodgers	3–5	Rau	**Kison** (1–2)	Hough	21,612	7–7
15	April 28	@ Dodgers	1–2	Hooton	**Reuss** (2–2)	—	22,769	7–8
16	April 30	@ Padres	4–3	**Rooker** (2–1)	Spillner	**Moose** (2)	17,010	8–8

May: 17–11 (Home: 10–6; Away: 7–5)

#	Date	Opponent	Score	Win	Loss	Save	Attendance	Record
17	May 1	@ Padres	10–6	**Candelaria** (2–1)	Greif	—	21,773	9–8
18	May 2	@ Padres	2–4	Jones	**Medich** (1–3)	—	21,702	9–9
19	May 4	Giants	6–5	**Reuss** (3–2)	Caldwell	**Moose** (3)	4,729	10–9
20	May 5	Giants	6–1	**Kison** (2–2)	Halicki	—	6,321	11–9
21	May 6	Giants	3–0	**Rooker** (3–1)	Barr	**Demery** (1)	5,111	12–9
22	May 7	Braves	3–1	**Candelaria** (3–1)	Messersmith	—	6,049	13–9
23	May 8	Braves	5–3	**Medich** (2–3)	Niekro	**Giusti** (1)	6,864	14–9
24	May 9	Braves	5–2	**Reuss** (4–2)	Ruthven	—	9,275	15–9
25	May 11	@ Reds	0–6	Nolan	**Kison** (2–3)	—	26,850	15–10
26	May 12	@ Reds	6–3	**Rooker** (4–1)	Gullett	—	26,053	16–10
27	May 14	Dodgers	2–3	Hough	**Candelaria** (3–2)	Marshall	13,764	16–11
28	May 15	Dodgers	4–2	**Medich** (3–3)	Rau	**Moose** (4)	12,165	17–11
29	May 16	Dodgers	0–6	Hooton	**Reuss** (4–3)	—	15,334	17–12
30	May 17	@ Cardinals	2–1	**Kison** (3–3)	Curtis	**Moose** (5)	10,538	18–12
31	May 18	@ Cardinals	4–1	**Rooker** (5–1)	Hrabosky	—	10,288	19–12
32	May 19	@ Cardinals	7–6	**Hernandez** (1–0)	Rasmussen	**Moose** (6)	11,229	20–12
33	May 20	@ Cardinals	1–4	Denny	**Medich** (3–4)	—	11,315	20–13
34	May 21	Cubs	4–5	Reuschel	**Demery** (1–1)	Knowles	9,342	20–14
35	May 22	Cubs	4–3 (16)	**Moose** (1–0)	Reuschel	—	7,081	21–14
36	May 23	Cubs	5–6	Zamora	**Tekulve** (0–1)	Sutter		21–15
37	May 23	Cubs	9–1	**Reuss** (5–3)	Garman	—	20,477	22–15
38	May 24	Expos	2–4	Fryman	**Candelaria** (3–3)	Scherman	5,420	22–16
39	May 25	Expos	3–6 (11)	Granger	**Moose** (1–1)	—	4,805	22–17
40	May 26	Expos	6–3	**Demery** (2–1)	Warthen	**Candelaria** (1)	6,581	23–17
41	May 29	@ Cubs	1–4	Bonham	**Kison** (3–4)	Zamora	12,357	23–18
42	May 30	@ Cubs	4–2	**Rooker** (6–1)	Burris	—	19,410	24–18
43	May 31	@ Mets	2–13	Matlack	**Reuss** (5–4)	—		24–19
44	May 31	@ Mets	2–1	**Medich** (4–4)	Apodaca	—	46,004	25–19

June: 16–10 (Home: 6–6; Away: 10–4)

#	Date	Opponent	Score	Win	Loss	Save	Attendance	Record
45	June 1	@ Mets	3–2	**Candelaria** (4–3)	Koosman	—	13,596	26–19
46	June 2	@ Expos	4–2	**Kison** (4–4)	Fryman	**Giusti** (2)	11,337	27–19
47	June 3	@ Expos	1–7	Stanhouse	**Rooker** (6–2)	—	7,951	27–20
48	June 4	Padres	7–2	**Reuss** (6–4)	Freisleben	—	9,249	28–20
49	June 5	Padres	9–11 (15)	Freisleben	**Hernandez** (1–1)	—	15,558	28–21
50	June 6	Padres	1–6	Strom	**Candelaria** (4–4)	—	51,726	28–22
51	June 7	Reds	5–4	**Moose** (2–1)	McEnaney	**Giusti** (3)	16,001	29–22
52	June 8	Reds	5–10	Alcala	**Rooker** (6–3)	McEnaney	17,331	29–23
53	June 9	Reds	1–6	Nolan	**Reuss** (6–5)	—	18,127	29–24
54	June 10	Reds	1–6	Gullett	**Medich** (4–5)	—	17,280	29–25
55	June 11	@ Braves	6–2	**Candelaria** (5–4)	Moret	**Moose** (7)	13,687	30–25
56	June 12	@ Braves	4–2 (11)	**Moose** (3–1)	Devine	**Tekulve** (1)	20,117	31–25
57	June 13	@ Braves	6–5	**Demery** (3–1)	Leon	**Moose** (8)	15,656	32–25
58	June 14	@ Astros	2–1	**Reuss** (7–5)	Richard	—	9,884	33–25
59	June 16	@ Astros	6–3	**Medich** (5–5)	Andujar	**Demery** (2)	12,249	34–25
60	June 18	Astros	7–3	**Candelaria** (6–4)	Richard	—	19,141	35–25
61	June 20	Astros	4–9	Griffin	**Moose** (3–2)	—	18,670	35–26
62	June 22	@ Cubs	10–7	**Demery** (4–1)	Knowles	**Hernandez** (3)	10,116	36–26
63	June 23	@ Cubs	5–6	Zamora	**Moose** (3–3)	—	17,661	36–27
64	June 24	@ Cubs	1–2 (13)	Zamora	**Langford** (0–1)	—	3,824	36–28
65	June 25	@ Expos	9–2	**Kison** (5–4)	Carrithers	—	6,581	37–28
66	June 26	@ Expos	7–6	**Demery** (5–1)	Murray	—	10,445	38–28
67	June 27	@ Expos	3–4	Fryman	**Medich** (5–6)	Murray	12,824	38–29
68	June 28	Cubs	9–2	**Rooker** (7–3)	Coleman	—	7,370	39–29
69	June 29	Cubs	10–1	**Candelaria** (7–4)	Renko	—	8,774	40–29
70	June 30	Cubs	7–5	**Kison** (6–4)	Bonham	**Moose** (9)	10,681	41–29

July: 15–15 (Home: 8–7; Away: 7–8)

#	Date	Opponent	Score	Win	Loss	Save	Attendance	Record
71	July 2	Phillies	10–9 (10)	**Hernandez** (2–1)	Garber	—	39,328	42–29
72	July 3	Phillies	2–3	McGraw	**Moose** (3–4)	—	19,327	42–30
73	July 4	Phillies	5–10	Carlton	**Demery** (5–2)	Reed		42–31
74	July 4	Phillies	7–1	**Kison** (7–4)	Kaat	—	32,422	43–31
75	July 5	@ Braves	6–8	Dal Canton	**Hernandez** (2–2)	Marshall	48,467	43–32
76	July 6	@ Braves	2–4	Messersmith	**Rooker** (7–4)	Marshall	12,448	43–33
77	July 7	@ Braves	9–7	**Reuss** (8–5)	Ruthven	**Moose** (10)	11,480	44–33
78	July 9	@ Reds	11–12 (10)	Eastwick	**Demery** (5–3)	—		44–34
79	July 9	@ Reds	1–2	Norman	**Medich** (5–7)	—	53,328	44–35
80	July 10	@ Reds	7–1	**Candelaria** (8–4)	Billingham	—	50,756	45–35
81	July 11	@ Reds	8–5	**Tekulve** (1–1)	Borbon	**Reuss** (1)	47,153	46–35
82	July 15	Braves	13–1	**Candelaria** (9–4)	Niekro	—	10,488	47–35
83	July 16	Braves	7–2	**Reuss** (9–5)	Messersmith	—	11,151	48–35
84	July 17	Braves	2–10	Ruthven	**Kison** (7–5)	—	14,776	48–36
85	July 18	Reds	8–9	Billingham	**Medich** (5–8)	Eastwick	33,697	48–37
86	July 19	Reds	2–4	Zachry	**Rooker** (7–5)	—	26,585	48–38
87	July 20	Astros	9–5	**Candelaria** (10–4)	Griffin	**Tekulve** (2)		49–38
88	July 20	Astros	3–4	Forsch	**Giusti** (0–1)	—	11,922	49–39
89	July 21	Astros	5–1	**Reuss** (10–5)	Dierker	—		50–39
90	July 21	Astros	4–1	**Demery** (6–3)	Andujar	**Giusti** (4)	12,209	51–39
91	July 22	@ Phillies	0–3	Underwood	**Kison** (7–6)	Reed	43,050	51–40
92	July 23	@ Phillies	1–11	Lonborg	**Medich** (5–9)	—	40,120	51–41
93	July 24	@ Phillies	8–5	**Rooker** (8–5)	Christenson	**Giusti** (5)		52–41
94	July 24	@ Phillies	1–7	Carlton	**Moose** (3–5)	—	57,723	52–42
95	July 25	@ Phillies	7–13	Reed	**Giusti** (0–2)	—	37,692	52–43
96	July 27	@ Cardinals	3–1	**Kison** (8–6)	Falcone	—	13,953	53–43
97	July 28	@ Mets	1–0 (13)	**Giusti** (1–2)	Sanders	—	22,215	54–43
98	July 29	@ Mets	2–1 (10)	**Tekulve** (2–1)	Lockwood	—	12,588	55–43
99	July 30	Expos	4–3 (13)	**Tekulve** (3–1)	Kerrigan	—	12,774	56–43
100	July 31	Expos	6–7	Murray	**Moose** (3–6)	—	10,981	56–44

August: 16–13 (Home: 8–8; Away: 8–5)

#	Date	Opponent	Score	Win	Loss	Save	Attendance	Record
101	August 1	Expos	0–2	Rogers	**Kison** (8–7)	—	17,150	56–45
102	August 2	Cardinals	0–4	Falcone	**Medich** (5–10)	—	7,553	56–46
103	August 3	Cardinals	2–1	**Rooker** (9–5)	Greif	—		57–46
104	August 3	Cardinals	2–4	Hrabosky	**Giusti** (1–3)	Wallace	14,781	57–47
105	August 4	Cardinals	2–1 (12)	**Giusti** (2–3)	Wallace	—	8,426	58–47
106	August 5	Mets	4–7	Matlack	**Reuss** (10–6)	Lockwood	7,836	58–48
107	August 7	Mets	12–3	**Kison** (9–7)	Seaver	—		59–48
108	August 7	Mets	2–4	Espinosa	**Medich** (5–11)	Lockwood	12,364	59–49
109	August 8	Mets	4–7	Lolich	**Rooker** (9–6)	—	16,538	59–50
110	August 9	Dodgers	2–0	**Candelaria** (11–4)	Rau	—	9,860	60–50
111	August 10	Dodgers	1–5	Sutton	**Reuss** (10–7)	—	13,670	60–51
112	August 11	Dodgers	0–2	Rhoden	**Demery** (6–4)	—	16,222	60–52
113	August 13	@ Astros	8–5	**Tekulve** (4–1)	Niekro	—	17,876	61–52
114	August 14	@ Astros	5–4	**Giusti** (3–3)	Pentz	—	9,721	62–52
115	August 15	@ Astros	8–6	**Medich** (6–11)	Larson	**Tekulve** (3)		63–52
116	August 15	@ Astros	3–0	**Reuss** (11–7)	Sambito	—	16,326	64–52
117	August 17	@ Giants	6–7	Lavelle	**Moose** (3–7)	Williams	9,215	64–53
118	August 18	@ Giants	12–1 (7)	**Rooker** (10–6)	Montefusco	—	3,817	65–53
119	August 19	@ Giants	1–0	**Candelaria** (12–4)	Barr	—	2,709	66–53
120	August 20	@ Dodgers	1–8	Rau	**Kison** (9–8)	Hough	25,107	66–54
121	August 21	@ Dodgers	1–5	Sutton	**Moose** (3–8)	—	42,235	66–55
122	August 22	@ Dodgers	6–1	**Demery** (7–4)	Rhoden	**Tekulve** (4)	24,295	67–55
123	August 23	@ Padres	4–5	Johnson	**Rooker** (10–7)	Metzger	18,396	67–56
124	August 24	@ Padres	3–7	Strom	**Candelaria** (12–5)	—	11,002	67–57
125	August 25	@ Padres	3–0	**Kison** (10–8)	Freisleben	—	10,963	68–57
126	August 27	Giants	5–2	**Demery** (8–4)	Montefusco	—	12,580	69–57
127	August 28	Giants	7–1	**Rooker** (11–7)	D'Acquisto	—	11,043	70–57
128	August 29	Giants	3–2 (11)	**Candelaria** (13–5)	Moffitt	—	12,972	71–57
129	August 31	Padres	3–0	**Reuss** (12–7)	Jones	—	9,674	72–57

September: 17–13 (Home: 8–4; Away: 9–9)

#	Date	Opponent	Score	Win	Loss	Save	Attendance	Record
130	September 1	Padres	4–1	**Kison** (11–8)	Strom	**Tekulve** (5)	5,381	73–57
131	September 2	Padres	5–0	**Demery** (9–4)	Freisleben	—	5,545	74–57
132	September 3	@ Expos	9–7	**Rooker** (12–7)	Stanhouse	**Tekulve** (6)		75–57
133	September 3	@ Expos	7–2	**Candelaria** (14–5)	Carrithers	—	6,342	76–57
134	September 4	@ Expos	5–3	**Giusti** (4–3)	Murray	**Tekulve** (7)	3,290	77–57
135	September 5	@ Expos	0–1	Fryman	**Reuss** (12–8)	—	6,180	77–58
136	September 6	Phillies	6–2	**Kison** (12–8)	Kaat	—		78–58
137	September 6	Phillies	5–1	**Demery** (10–4)	Underwood	—	41,703	79–58
138	September 8	Phillies	6–1	**Rooker** (13–7)	Carlton	—	30,976	80–58
139	September 10	Expos	2–4	Fryman	**Candelaria** (14–6)	—	12,032	80–59
140	September 11	Expos	4–3	**Reuss** (13–8)	Rogers	**Tekulve** (8)	7,509	81–59
141	September 12	Expos	6–1	**Kison** (13–8)	Stanhouse	**Tekulve** (9)	12,765	82–59
142	September 13	Mets	0–5	Seaver	**Demery** (10–5)	—	7,892	82–60
143	September 14	Mets	3–4	Lockwood	**Rooker** (13–8)	—	7,867	82–61
144	September 15	@ Phillies	7–2	**Candelaria** (15–6)	Kaat	—	45,010	83–61
145	September 16	@ Phillies	7–6	**Tekulve** (5–1)	Reed	—	35,806	84–61
146	September 17	@ Mets	4–1	**Medich** (7–11)	Matlack	**Giusti** (6)	14,304	85–61
147	September 18	@ Mets	2–6	Seaver	**Demery** (10–6)	—	15,879	85–62
148	September 19	@ Mets	6–7	Espinosa	**Giusti** (4–4)	Lockwood	18,652	85–63
149	September 20	@ Mets	4–5	Apodaca	**Tekulve** (5–2)	—	5,922	85–64
150	September 21	@ Cubs	4–3	**Kison** (14–8)	Renko	**Rooker** (1)		86–64
151	September 21	@ Cubs	1–2 (13)	Reuschel	**Moose** (3–9)	—	5,017	86–65
152	September 22	@ Cubs	3–4	Coleman	**Tekulve** (5–3)	—	3,375	86–66
153	September 23	@ Cubs	5–4 (10)	**Giusti** (5–4)	Knowles	**Kison** (1)	2,132	87–66
154	September 24	@ Cardinals	6–10	Forsch	**Candelaria** (15–7)	—		87–67
155	September 24	@ Cardinals	11–1	**Rooker** (14–8)	Curtis	—	10,368	88–67
156	September 25	@ Cardinals	0–3	McGlothen	**Reuss** (13–9)	—	7,858	88–68
157	September 26	@ Cardinals	2–5	Denny	**Kison** (14–9)	Hrabosky	10,456	88–69
158	September 28	Cubs	5–1	**Medich** (8–11)	Reuschel	**Reuss** (2)	2,880	89–69
159	September 29	Cubs	0–1	Renko	**Demery** (10–7)	—	2,880	89–70

October: 3–0 (Home: 3–0; Away: 0–0)

#	Date	Opponent	Score	Win	Loss	Save	Attendance	Record
160	October 2	Cardinals	8–0	**Candelaria** (16–7)	McGlothen	—	4,250	90–70
161	October 3	Cardinals	1–0	**Rooker** (15–8)	Denny	—		91–70
162	October 3	Cardinals	1–0	**Reuss** (14–9)	Falcone	—	24,228	92–70

Legend: = Win = Loss
Bold = Pirates team member

=== Notable transactions ===
- June 8, 1976: Bob Long was drafted by the Pirates in the 24th round of the 1976 Major League Baseball draft.
- July 2, 1976: Albert Williams was released by the Pirates.
- September 8, 1976: Ramón Hernández was purchased from the Pirates by the Chicago Cubs.

=== Roster ===
1976 Pittsburgh Pirates
**Roster**
**Pitchers**: 17 Doug Bair; 45 John Candelaria; 44 Larry Demery; 31 Dave Giusti; 36 Ramón Hernández; 25 Bruce Kison; 30 Rick Langford; 32 Doc Medich; 38 Bob Moose; 41 Jerry Reuss; 19 Jim Rooker; 27 Kent Tekulve	**Catchers**: 5 Duffy Dyer; 14 Ed Ott; 35 Manny Sanguillén; **Infielders**: 3 Richie Hebner; 15 Tommy Helms; 23 Ed Kirkpatrick; 11 Mario Mendoza; 12 Craig Reynolds; 7 Bob Robertson; 8 Willie Stargell; 6 Rennie Stennett; 10 Frank Taveras	**Outfielders**: 46 Tony Armas; 37 Miguel Diloné; 18 Omar Moreno; 16 Al Oliver; 39 Dave Parker; 28 Bill Robinson; 22 Richie Zisk	**Manager**: 40 Danny Murtaugh; **Coaches**: 43 Don Leppert; 42 Don Osborn; 2 José Pagán; 4 Bob Skinner

== Player stats ==
= Indicates team leader

=== Batting ===
==== Starters by position ====
Note: Pos = Position; G = Games played; AB = At bats; R = Runs scored; H = Hits; Avg. = Batting average; HR = Home runs; RBI = Runs batted in; SB = Stolen bases

Pos	Player	G	AB	R	H	Avg.	HR	RBI	SB
C	Manny Sanguillén	114	389	52	113	.290	2	36	2
1B	Willie Stargell	117	428	54	110	.257	20	65	2
2B	Rennie Stennett	157	654	59	168	.257	2	60	18
3B	Richie Hebner	132	434	60	108	.249	8	51	1
SS	Frank Taveras	144	519	76	134	.258	0	24	58
LF	Richie Zisk	155	581	91	168	.289	21	89	1
CF	Al Oliver	121	443	62	143	.323	12	61	6
RF	Dave Parker	138	537	82	168	.313	13	90	19

==== Other batters ====
Note: G = Games played; AB = At bats; R = Runs scored; H = Hits; Avg.= Batting average; HR = Home runs; RBI = Runs batted in; SB = Stolen bases

Player	G	AB	R	H	Avg.	HR	RBI	SB
Bill Robinson	122	393	55	119	.303	21	64	2
Duffy Dyer	69	184	12	41	.223	3	9	0
Ed Kirkpatrick	83	146	14	34	.233	0	16	1
Bob Robertson	61	129	10	28	.217	2	25	0
Omar Moreno	48	122	24	33	.270	2	12	15
Mario Mendoza	50	92	6	17	.185	0	12	0
Tommy Helms	62	87	10	24	.276	1	13	0
Ed Ott	27	39	2	12	.308	0	5	0
Miguel Diloné	16	17	7	4	.235	0	0	5
Tony Armas	4	6	0	2	.333	0	1	0
Craig Reynolds	7	4	1	1	.250	1	1	0

=== Pitching ===
==== Starting pitchers ====
Note: G = Games pitched; IP = Innings pitched; W = Wins; L = Losses; ERA = Earned run average; SO = Strikeouts

Player	G	IP	W	L	ERA	SO
John Candelaria	32	220.0	16	7	3.15	138
Jerry Reuss	31	209.1	14	9	3.53	108
Jim Rooker	30	198.2	15	8	3.35	92
Bruce Kison	31	193.0	14	9	3.08	98
Doc Medich	29	179.0	8	11	3.52	86

==== Other pitchers ====
Note: G = Games pitched; IP = Innings pitched; W = Wins; L = Losses; ERA = Earned run average; SO = Strikeouts

Player	G	IP	W	L	ERA	SO
Larry Demery	36	145.0	10	7	3.17	72

==== Relief pitchers ====
Note: G = Games pitched; W = Wins; L = Losses; SV = Saves; ERA = Earned run average; SO = Strikeouts

Player	G	W	L	SV	ERA	SO
Bob Moose	53	3	9	10	3.68	38
Kent Tekulve	64	5	3	9	2.45	68
Dave Giusti	40	5	4	6	4.32	24
Ramón Hernández	37	2	2	3	3.56	17
Rick Langford	12	0	1	0	6.26	17
Doug Bair	4	0	0	0	5.68	4

== Awards and honors ==
1976 Major League Baseball All-Star Game

== Farm system ==
Level	Team	League	Manager
AAA	Charleston Charlies	International League	Tim Murtaugh
AA	Shreveport Captains	Texas League	Johnny Lipon
A	Salem Pirates	Carolina League	Steve Demeter
A	Charleston Patriots	Western Carolinas League	Mike Ryan
A-Short Season	Niagara Falls Pirates	New York–Penn League	Glenn Ezell
Rookie	GCL Pirates	Gulf Coast League	Woody Huyke
