= John Alevizos =

American businessman

- Born: December 11, 1919; Boston, Massachusetts, U.S.
- Died: August 1, 2005 (aged 85); Weston, Massachusetts, U.S.
- Occupation: Baseball executive
- Years active: 1969–1976

John Peter Alevizos (December 11, 1919 – August 1, 2005) was an American businessman and a front-office executive in professional baseball. A native of Boston, Massachusetts, he was a real-estate developer for over forty years and a former member of the faculty of the Boston University School of Management.

Alevizos was an alumnus of Boston University, where he earned both bachelor's and master's degrees, and held a certificate in city planning from the Massachusetts Institute of Technology. He also attended Harvard Business School. He was a United States Army veteran of World War II, where he served in the Pacific Theater of Operations and was awarded the Bronze Star.

A lifelong fan and former youth baseball coach, Alevizos became involved in professional baseball in 1969, when he purchased the Binghamton Triplets, Double-A Eastern League affiliate of the New York Yankees, and moved them to Manchester, New Hampshire. He operated the Manchester Yankees for two seasons, then joined the Boston Red Sox as vice president, administration, from 1971 to 1974. Functioning as the team's business manager, he helped expand the Red Sox' spring training facilities, then based in Winter Haven, Florida.

He resigned from the Red Sox on December 29, 1974, reportedly to pursue investing in the Cleveland Indians or an expansion team for Toronto. Although those efforts were unsuccessful, Alevizos returned to baseball in March 1976 when he was named general manager of the Atlanta Braves by the club's new owner, Ted Turner. Alevizos served six months in the post before his replacement by Bill Lucas in September. One month into Alevizos' tenure, the Braves signed free agent pitcher Andy Messersmith, whose grievance against the reserve clause led to the arbitrator's ruling permitting free agency in baseball.

In 2004, Alevizos, then 84, made headlines when he proposed to buy the MLB-owned Montreal Expos franchise with the intent to move them to Connecticut. Instead, the Expos relocated to Washington, D.C., where they now play as the Washington Nationals.

John Alevizos died in Weston, Massachusetts, at age 85.

Preceded by Eddie Robinson	Atlanta Braves General manager March–September 1976	Succeeded by Bill Lucas
