= 1976 Los Angeles Dodgers season =

1976 Los Angeles Dodgers
- League: National League
- Division: West
- Ballpark: Dodger Stadium
- City: Los Angeles
- Record: 92–70 (.568)
- Divisional place: 2nd
- Owner: Walter O'Malley
- President: Peter O'Malley
- General managers: Al Campanis
- Managers: Walter Alston, Tommy Lasorda
- Television: KTTV
- Radio: KABC; Vin Scully, Jerry Doggett; XEGM; Jaime Jarrín, Rudy Hoyos

The 1976 Los Angeles Dodgers season was the 87th season for the Los Angeles Dodgers franchise in Major League Baseball (MLB), their 19th season in Los Angeles, California, and their 15th season playing their home games at Dodger Stadium in Los Angeles California. The Dodgers finished the season in second place in the National League West. The big news was when long-time manager of two decades Walter Alston resigned abruptly near the end of the season and was replaced by Tommy Lasorda who would manage the team for two decades himself.

== Offseason ==
- November 17, 1975: Jimmy Wynn, Tom Paciorek, Lee Lacy and Jerry Royster were traded by the Dodgers to the Atlanta Braves for Dusty Baker and Ed Goodson.
- December 23, 1975: Bob Randall was traded by the Dodgers to the Minnesota Twins for Danny Walton.
- March 2: Willie Crawford was traded by the Dodgers to the St. Louis Cardinals for Ted Sizemore.
- March 2: Ken McMullen was released by the Dodgers.
- March 31: Orlando Alvarez and cash were traded by the Dodgers to the California Angels for Ellie Rodríguez.

== Regular season ==
=== Season standings ===
NL West
Team	W	L	Pct.	GB	Home	Road
Cincinnati Reds	102	60	.630	—	49‍–‍32	53‍–‍28
Los Angeles Dodgers	92	70	.568	10	49‍–‍32	43‍–‍38
Houston Astros	80	82	.494	22	46‍–‍36	34‍–‍46
San Francisco Giants	74	88	.457	28	40‍–‍41	34‍–‍47
San Diego Padres	73	89	.451	29	42‍–‍38	31‍–‍51
Atlanta Braves	70	92	.432	32	34‍–‍47	36‍–‍45

=== Record vs. opponents ===
1976 National League record Sources:
Team	ATL	CHC	CIN	HOU	LAD	MON	NYM	PHI	PIT	SD	SF	STL
Atlanta	—	6–6	6–12	7–11	8–10	8–4	4–8	5–7	3–9	10–8	9–9	4–8
Chicago	6–6	—	3–9	5–7	3–9	11–7	5–13	8–10	8–10	6–6	8–4	12–6
Cincinnati	12–6	9–3	—	12–6	13–5	9–3	6–6	5–7	8–4	13–5	9–9	6–6
Houston	11–7	7–5	6–12	—	5–13	10–2	6–6	4–8	2–10	10–8	10–8	9–3
Los Angeles	10–8	9–3	5–13	13–5	—	10–2	7–5	5–7	9–3	6–12	8–10	10–2
Montreal	4–8	7–11	3–9	2–10	2–10	—	8–10	3–15	8–10	4–8	7–5	7–11
New York	8–4	13–5	6–6	6–6	5–7	10–8	—	5–13	10–8	7–5	7–5	9–9
Philadelphia	7-5	10–8	7–5	8–4	7–5	15–3	13–5	—	8–10	8–4	6–6	12–6
Pittsburgh	9–3	10–8	4–8	10–2	3–9	10–8	8–10	10–8	—	7–5	9–3	12–6
San Diego	8–10	6–6	5–13	8–10	12–6	8–4	5–7	4–8	5–7	—	8–10	4–8
San Francisco	9–9	4–8	9–9	8–10	10–8	5–7	5–7	6–6	3–9	10–8	—	5–7
St. Louis	8–4	6–12	6–6	3–9	2–10	11–7	9–9	6–12	6–12	8–4	7–5	—

=== Opening Day lineup ===
Opening Day starters
Name	Position
Bill Buckner	Left fielder
Ted Sizemore	Second baseman
Dusty Baker	Center fielder
Steve Garvey	First baseman
Ron Cey	Third baseman
Joe Ferguson	Right fielder
Steve Yeager	Catcher
Bill Russell	Shortstop
Don Sutton	Starting pitcher

=== Notable transactions ===
- June 15: Joe Ferguson, Bob Detherage and Fred Tisdale (minors) were traded by the Dodgers to the St. Louis Cardinals for Reggie Smith.
- June 23: Mike Marshall was traded by the Dodgers to the Atlanta Braves for Elías Sosa and Lee Lacy.

=== Roster ===
1976 Los Angeles Dodgers
Roster
Pitchers: 44 Al Downing; 46 Burt Hooton; 49 Charlie Hough; 25 Tommy John; 35 Dennis Lewallyn; 28 Mike Marshall; 31 Doug Rau; 36 Rick Rhoden; 27 Elías Sosa; 48 Rick Sutcliffe; 20 Don Sutton; 45 Stan Wall	Catchers: 4 Kevin Pasley; 55 Sergio Robles; 2 Ellie Rodríguez; 7 Steve Yeager; Infielders: 1 Rick Auerbach; 10 Ron Cey; 14 Iván DeJesús; 6 Steve Garvey; 21 Ed Goodson; 15 Davey Lopes; 18 Bill Russell; 5 Ted Sizemore	Outfielders: 12 Dusty Baker; 22 Bill Buckner; 3 Glenn Burke; 37 Henry Cruz; 13 Joe Ferguson; 43 John Hale; 34 Lee Lacy; 9 Leron Lee; 41 Jim Lyttle; 11 Manny Mota; 17 Joe Simpson; 8 Reggie Smith; Other batters: 48 Danny Walton	Manager: 24 Walter Alston; 52 Tommy Lasorda; Coaches: 26 Red Adams; 54 Monty Basgall; 58 Mark Cresse; 19 Jim Gilliam; 52 Tommy Lasorda

== Player stats ==
=== Batting ===
==== Starters by position ====
Note: Pos = Position; G = Games played; AB = At bats; H = Hits; Avg. = Batting average; HR = Home runs; RBI = Runs batted in

Pos	Player	G	AB	H	Avg.	HR	RBI
C	Steve Yeager	117	359	77	.214	11	35
1B	Steve Garvey	162	631	200	.317	13	80
2B	Davey Lopes	117	427	103	.241	4	20
3B	Ron Cey	145	502	139	.277	23	60
SS	Bill Russell	149	554	152	.274	5	65
LF	Bill Buckner	154	642	193	.301	7	60
CF	Dusty Baker	112	384	93	.242	4	39
RF	Reggie Smith	65	225	63	.280	10	26

==== Other batters ====
Note: G = Games played; AB = At bats; H = Hits; Avg. = Batting average; HR = Home runs; RBI = Runs batted in

Player	G	AB	H	Avg.	HR	RBI
Ted Sizemore	84	266	64	.241	0	18
Joe Ferguson	54	185	41	.222	6	18
Lee Lacy	53	158	42	.266	0	14
Ed Goodson	83	118	27	.229	3	17
John Hale	44	91	14	.154	0	8
Henry Cruz	49	88	16	.182	4	14
Jim Lyttle	23	68	15	.221	0	5
Ellie Rodríguez	36	66	14	.212	0	9
Manny Mota	50	52	15	.288	0	13
Kevin Pasley	23	52	12	.231	0	2
Rick Auerbach	36	47	6	.128	0	1
Glenn Burke	25	46	11	.239	0	5
Leron Lee	23	45	6	.133	0	2
Iván DeJesús	22	41	7	.171	0	2
Joe Simpson	23	30	4	.133	0	0
Danny Walton	18	15	2	.133	0	2
Sergio Robles	6	3	0	.000	0	0

=== Pitching ===
==== Starting pitchers ====
Note: G = Games pitched; IP = Innings pitched; W = Wins; L = Losses; ERA = Earned run average; SO = Strikeouts

Player	G	IP	W	L	ERA	SO
Don Sutton	35	267.2	21	10	3.06	161
Doug Rau	34	231.0	16	12	2.57	98
Burt Hooton	33	226.2	11	15	3.26	116
Tommy John	31	207.0	10	10	3.09	91
Rick Rhoden	27	181.0	12	3	2.98	77
Rick Sutcliffe	1	5.0	0	0	0.00	3

==== Other pitchers ====
Note: G = Games pitched; IP = Innings pitched; W = Wins; L = Losses; ERA = Earned run average; SO = Strikeouts

Player	G	IP	W	L	ERA	SO
Al Downing	17	46.2	1	2	3.86	30
Dennis Lewallyn	4	16.2	1	1	2.16	4

==== Relief pitchers ====
Note: G = Games pitched; W = Wins; L = Losses; SV = Saves; ERA = Earned run average; SO = Strikeouts

Player	G	W	L	SV	ERA	SO
Charlie Hough	77	12	8	18	2.21	81
Mike Marshall	30	4	3	8	4.45	39
Stan Wall	31	2	2	1	3.60	27
Elías Sosa	24	2	4	1	3.48	20

== Awards and honors ==
- Gold Glove Award
  - Steve Garvey
- Comeback Player of the Year Award
  - Tommy John
- TSN National League All-Star
  - Don Sutton
- NL Pitcher of the Month
  - Don Sutton (September 1976)
- NL Player of the Month
  - Steve Garvey (September 1976)
- NL Player of the Week
  - Steve Garvey (May 17–23)
  - Reggie Smith (July 5–11)
  - Doug Rau (July 19–25)
  - Don Sutton (Sep. 20–26)
- Hutch Award
  - Tommy John

=== All-Stars ===
- 1976 Major League Baseball All-Star Game
  - Steve Garvey, starter, first base
  - Ron Cey, reserve
  - Rick Rhoden, reserve
  - Bill Russell, reserve

== Farm system ==
Level	Team	League	Manager
AAA	Albuquerque Dukes	Pacific Coast League	Stan Wasiak
AA	Waterbury Dodgers	Eastern League	Don LeJohn
A	Lodi Dodgers	California League	James B. Williams
A	Danville Dodgers	Midwest League	Dick McLaughlin
Rookie	Bellingham Dodgers	Northwest League	Bill Berrier

== 1976 Major League Baseball draft ==
The Dodgers drafted 41 players in the June draft and 14 in the January draft. Of those, ten players would eventually play in the Major Leagues.

The top draft pick in the June draft was catcher Mike Scioscia from Springfield High School in Pennsylvania. He would be the Dodgers starting catcher from 1980 to 1992 and was a 2-time All-Star and two-time World Series Champion with the Dodgers (1981 and 1988). After his playing career ended he became the manager of the Anaheim/Los Angeles Angels and would win another World Series as their manager in 2002.

1976 draft picks

=== January draft ===
Round	Name	Position	School	Signed	Career span	Highest level
1	Michael Wetklow	OF	Sacramento City College	No		
2	Dave Patterson	RHP	Cerritos College	Yes	1976–1982	MLB
3	Paul Bain	RHP	El Camino College	Yes	1976–1981	AAA
4	Mookie Wilson	OF	Spartanburg Methodist College	No; Mets-1977	1977–1991	MLB
5	Timothy DeWald	RHP	Cypress College	No		
6	Robert Weis	RHP	Sacramento City College	No		
7	Mark Garber	RHP	Antelope Valley College	No		
8	Richard Barnhart	RHP	Green River Community College	No; Indians-1978	1979–1980	A
9	Rickey Lear	RHP	Valencia Community College	No; Reds-1976	1976–1977	A
10	Robert Benda	SS	Palm Beach Community College	No; Tigers-1978	1978–1979	A
11	Charles Young	RHP	Los Angeles Pierce College	No		

==== January secondary phase ====
Round	Name	Position	School	Signed	Career span	Highest level
1	Jack Lawson	RHP	Phoenix College	Yes	1976	A-
2	Charles Dorgan	LHP	Green River Community College	Yes	1976–1978	A
3	Larry Buckle	RHP	Long Beach City College	No; Reds-1978	1978–1984	AA

=== June draft ===
Round	Name	Position	School	Signed	Career span	Highest level
1	Mike Scioscia	C	Springfield High School	Yes	1976–1994	MLB
2	Don Ruzek	SS	Lakewood High School	Yes	1976–1985	AA
3	Max Venable	OF	Cordova High School	Yes	1976–1993	MLB
4	George Kunkler	LHP	University of Oklahoma	Yes	1976–1977	AA
5	Ted Power	RHP	Kansas State University	Yes	1976–1998	MLB
6	Mike Howard	OF	Sacramento High School	Yes	1976–1984	MLB
7	Kelly Snider	1B	University of Oklahoma	Yes	1976–1982	AAA
8	Robert Kownacki	SS	Fairfield University	Yes	1976	A
9	Charles Phillips	LHP	University of Southern California	Yes	1976–1980	AAA
10	Bill Swoope	C	Norfolk Catholic High School	Yes	1976–1981	AA
11	William Martin	RHP	William Carey College	Yes	1976–1978	A
12	Jimmie Giles	OF	Alcorn State University	Yes	1976	A-
13	James Peterson	RHP	Arizona State University	Yes	1976–1977	A
14	Douglas Elliott	2B	Fullerton Union High School	No; Mets-1979	1979	A-
15	Keith MacWhorter	RHP	Bryant College	Yes	1976–1984	MLB
16	Jack Perconte	2B	Murray State University	Yes	1976–1987	MLB
17	Miguel Rodriguez	RHP	Adlai Stevenson High School	Yes	1976	A-
18	Timothy Jones	C	Wooster High School	Yes	1976–1978	A
19	Eric Schmidt	LHP	Mission Viejo High School	Yes	1976–1979	A
20	Dan Henry	3B	Loyola Marymount University	Yes	1976–1978	A
21	Jeff Albert	RHP	Long Island University, C. W. Post Campus	Yes	1976–1979	AA
22	Bob Amico	1B	University at Buffalo, State University of New York	Yes	1976	A
23	Richard Martini	OF	University of California, Davis	No		
24	Mickey Lashley	RHP	University of Oklahoma	Yes	1977–1979	AA
25	José Martínez	SS	South San Francisco High School	No		
26	George Kaage	1B	Kankakee Community College	Yes	1976–1978	A
27	Mark Kryka	RHP	Antigo High School	Yes	1976–1978	A
28	Steven Silagi	RHP	El Rancho High School	No		
29	Mickey Martin	C	Grant High School	No		
30	Douglas Foster	OF	Compton High School	Yes	1976–1978	A
31	Bubba Holland	RHP	South Florence High School	No; Astros-1978	1978–1985	AAA
32	Stephen Nelson	RHP	Wilson High School	No		
33	Jeff Hunter	3B	Millard High School	No; Red Sox-1980	1980–1982	A
34	Mark Wychopen	C	South Houston High School	No		
35	Scott Fletcher	SS	Wadsworth High School	No; Cubs-1979	1979–1995	MLB
36	Bruce Scheidegger	3B	Chadwick High School	No		
37	Donald Brodell	OF	University of Arkansas at Little Rock	Yes	1976–1977	A
38	James Riedel	RHP	University at Buffalo, State University of New York	No		
39	Gerald Snow	RHP	Madras High School	No		

==== June secondary phase ====
Round	Name	Position	School	Signed	Career span	Highest level
1	Joe Ferri	OF	Pasadena City College	No		
2	Mike Walters	RHP	Chaffey College	No; Angels-1977	1977–1985	MLB
