= Doug Clarey =

American baseball player (born 1954)

- Infielder
- Born: April 20, 1954 (age 72); Los Angeles, California, U.S.
- Batted: Right Threw: Right

MLB debut
- April 20, 1976, for the St. Louis Cardinals

Last MLB appearance
- August 4, 1976, for the St. Louis Cardinals

MLB statistics
- Batting average: .250
- Home runs: 1
- Runs batted in: 2
- Stats at Baseball Reference

Teams
- St. Louis Cardinals (1976)

Doug Clarey (born April 20, 1954) is an American former professional baseball infielder. He played one season in Major League Baseball (MLB), appearing in nine games for the 1976 St. Louis Cardinals. Listed at 6 feet 0 inches (1.83 m) and 180 pounds (82 kg), he batted and threw right-handed.

== Biography ==
Clarey played high school baseball at Homestead High School in Cupertino, California. He was selected by the Minnesota Twins in the sixth round of the 1972 MLB draft. He then played for Twins' farm teams during the 1972 to 1974 seasons. In December 1974, the St. Louis Cardinals selected Clarey from the Twins in the Rule 5 draft. During the 1975 season, Clarey played for the Arkansas Travelers at the Double-A level, batting .206 with three home runs and 44 RBIs in 130 games.

In 1976, Clarey played in nine games for the Cardinals, his only major league appearances. He played three games with St. Louis in April, one in May, two in July, and three in August, entering two games as a pinch hitter, two games as a pinch runner, and the other games as a substitute second baseman. In four at bats, he recorded one hit, which came against the San Francisco Giants on April 28. In the top of the 16th inning of a 2–2 tie game at Candlestick Park, Clarey pinch hit for pitcher Mike Proly. Facing pitcher Mike Caldwell with a runner at first base and two outs, Clarey hit a home run, putting St. Louis ahead, 4–2. Reliever Danny Frisella replaced Clarey for the bottom of the inning, retiring the side in order.

Clarey also played for two St. Louis farm teams during 1976, then during the 1977 preseason was traded to the New York Mets organization, in exchange for outfielder Benny Ayala. Clarey played in 28 games for the Tidewater Tides, the Mets' Triple-A affiliate, batting .125 with three home runs and nine RBIs. He finished the season with a Double-A affiliate of the Milwaukee Brewers. In his final professional season, Clarey played for a Double-A affiliate of the Baltimore Orioles in 1978. Overall, in seven minor league seasons, Clarey batted .225 in 666 games, with 53 home runs and 288 RBIs. Defensively, he played 415 games at second base, 179 games at third base, and 53 games at shortstop.
