= Pete Falcone =

American baseball player (born 1953)

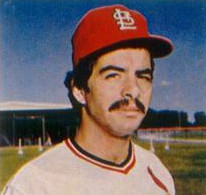
- Pitcher
- Born: October 1, 1953 (age 71); Brooklyn, New York, U.S.
- Batted: Left Threw: Left

MLB debut
- April 13, 1975, for the San Francisco Giants

Last MLB appearance
- September 17, 1984, for the Atlanta Braves

MLB statistics
- Win–loss record: 70–90
- Earned run average: 4.07
- Strikeouts: 865
- Stats at Baseball Reference

Teams
- San Francisco Giants (1975); St. Louis Cardinals (1976–1978); New York Mets (1979–1982); Atlanta Braves (1983–1984)

Peter Frank Falcone (born October 1, 1953) is an American former professional baseball pitcher for the San Francisco Giants, St. Louis Cardinals, New York Mets, and Atlanta Braves.

== Early years ==
As a senior at Lafayette High School in Brooklyn, New York (the same high school as Hall of Famer Sandy Koufax), Falcone was drafted by the Minnesota Twins in the thirteenth round of the 1972 Major League Baseball draft, but opted to attend Kingsborough Community College instead. He was then drafted by the Atlanta Braves in the second round of the January 1973 secondary amateur draft, but did not sign. Finally, when drafted by the San Francisco Giants in the first round (third overall) of the June 1973 secondary draft, Falcone signed.

Falcone impressed immediately, going 8–1 with a 1.50 earned run average and 102 strikeouts in 72 innings pitched for the Pioneer League's Great Falls Giants in his first professional season. He followed that up with 207 strikeouts in 1974 pitching in the California League and Texas League.

== San Francisco Giants ==
Falcone made his major league debut in the second game of an April 13, 1975, doubleheader with the Atlanta Braves. Falcone had been in spring training with the Giants as a non-roster invitee, but had not made the club. Just as the season was set to begin, Ron Bryant, who was set to be the Giants' fourth starter, unexpectedly retired. He was replaced in the rotation by Falcone.

Fellow rookie John Montefusco was masterful in the first game, pitching a complete game shutout. The second game began with Ralph Garr lining a triple to left field. Falcone managed to settle down afterwards, and strand Garr at third. Aside from a two-run home run by catcher Vic Correll, Falcone also held the Braves' batters at bay for eight innings. With the score tied 2–2 in the eighth, Garry Maddox, Derrel Thomas and Bobby Murcer hit consecutive singles to give the Giants a 4–2 lead. Randy Moffitt pitched the ninth to record the save, and give Falcone the win in his major league debut.

The most memorable start of his rookie season also came in the second game of a doubleheader with the Braves. Falcone held the Braves hitless through seven innings, and struck out Cito Gaston to lead off the eighth. Larvell Blanks followed with a ground out to short to put Falcone four outs away from being the first National League rookie to pitch a no-hitter since Burt Hooton in 1972. The next batter, Vic Correll, drew a walk. Words were exchanged between Correll and Giants first baseman Willie Montañez at first base, culminating with Correll taking a swing at Montañez. Both benches emptied, and Montañez was ejected from the game. When order was finally restored, the first batter, Rod Gilbreath, singled to center, breaking up the no-hitter.

On May 6, he again held the Braves hitless through the first six innings. Overall, he compiled a 12–11 record, 4.17 ERA and 131 strikeouts as a rookie.

== St. Louis Cardinals ==
With the Giants seeking to improve its infield defense, Falcone was sent to the St. Louis Cardinals for Gold Glove third baseman Ken Reitz at the Winter Meetings on December 8, 1975. He suffered through some hard luck his first season in St. Louis. Following a July 27 loss to the Pittsburgh Pirates in which he allowed just two earned runs in seven plus innings of work, Falcone's record stood at 6–11 despite a relatively mild 3.95 ERA. Eight of his eleven losses came in one run games.

He recorded his first shutout of the season in his next start, also against the Pirates, and drove in one of four Cardinal runs. He followed that up with a 4–1 win over the Philadelphia Phillies, and his second shutout of the season against the Atlanta Braves. He ended the season at 12–16 with a 3.23 ERA. The .222 batting average he held opposing batters to was fifth best in the league.

Under new manager Vern Rapp, the Cards improved to 83–79 in 1977 to finish third in the National League East. Falcone, however, suffered through one of his more difficult seasons. His record was 4–6 with a 5.40 ERA when he was demoted to the bullpen in late July. He made just one relief appearance before he was demoted to the triple A New Orleans Pelicans. He went 2–5 with a 4.91 ERA at New Orleans before returning to the Cardinals in September. He went 0–2 with a 5.87 ERA and recorded his first career save over the rest of the season.

Falcone began the 1978 season in the Cardinals' starting rotation, however, after going 0–5 with a 6.46 ERA, was reduced to a reliever and spot starter.

== New York Mets ==
He was dealt from the Cardinals to the New York Mets for Tom Grieve and Kim Seaman at the Winter Meetings on December 5, 1978. Falcone's hard luck continued in New York, as he lost his first five decisions with the Mets. He was in line to pick up his first Mets win on June 2; a Richie Hebner solo home run in the third gave him an early 5–0 lead against Phil Niekro and the Atlanta Braves. Falcone, however, was unable to hold the lead his club had spotted him, and he departed in the third inning with the score tied at five. He recorded his first win on June 25 with a five hit shutout of the Pittsburgh Pirates.

Falcone went 6–14 with a 4.16 ERA for a Mets team that lost 99 games in 1979. The strangest of those six wins came on August 21 against the Houston Astros. With two outs in the ninth, Falcone induced a lazy fly ball off the bat of Jeff Leonard. Mets center fielder Lee Mazzilli caught the ball for the final out of the game. Meanwhile, Mets shortstop Frank Taveras had sought and received time out from third base umpire Doug Harvey. Harvey ordered Leonard back into the batters box, and the Mets back onto the field. Given new life, Leonard slapped a single to center, however, the play was ruled dead for a second time, as New York first baseman Ed Kranepool was not yet in position when the pitch was delivered. Finally, Leonard hit a fly to left field Joel Youngblood caught for the final out of the game.

On May 1, 1980, Falcone tied a Major League record by striking out the first six batters of the game versus the Philadelphia Phillies. The feat had only been accomplished four other times in the majors. Falcone pitched seven innings, giving up two earned runs with eight strikeouts, however, Steve Carlton held the Mets to just one run to hang the L on Falcone. Though used primarily as a starter in 1980, Falcone began seeing more work in relief, and actually pitched better out of the bullpen. Falcone was 6–9 with a 5.25 ERA in his 23 starts. In fourteen relief appearances, Falcone was 1–1 with a 2.02 ERA.

As a result, Falcone was used more in relief in 1981. He made just one start in the first half of the strike shortened season, a loss to the Cardinals. As a reliever, he was 1–2 with one save and a 2.23 ERA. Injuries to Randy Jones and Tom Hausman forced manager Joe Torre to add Falcone back to the starting rotation in the second half of the season. He responded by going 4–0 with a 2.20 ERA.

Falcone went 8–10 with a 3.84 ERA for the George Bamberger led Mets in 1982. The biggest of those eight wins was a complete game against the Houston Astros on September 1 to snap a fifteen-game losing streak, the longest in the majors that season. After the season, he signed as a free agent with the Atlanta Braves.

Falcone went 26–37 with a 3.91 ERA as a Met. He was especially good at not allowing hits when runners were in scoring position, keeping batters in such circumstances to a .210 batting average in 1979, a .220 batting average in 1981, and a .211 batting average in 1982.

== Atlanta Braves ==
Whereas the Mets were perennially poor during Falcone's four-year tenure in New York, the Braves contended in the National League West throughout the 1983 season. His August 28 victory over the Pittsburgh Pirates improved his record to 9–3, and kept the Braves in first place by half a game over the Los Angeles Dodgers. They would, however, surrender first place the next day and finish the season in second place by three games.

Likewise, the Braves finished in second in 1984, this time to the San Diego Padres. Regardless, in September of his tenth major league season, Falcone announced that he planned to retire after the season. "I’m just tired of baseball", Falcone said in an interview with The Atlanta Journal. "I’m tired of the life style, and I can’t see any reason to go on doing it. The game is a game, and a certain part of it is enjoyable, but everything else, forget it."

Braves’ general manager John Mullen expressed surprise at Falcone's statement. "I hate to see a guy that young with that kind of arm retire", Mullen said.

== Career stats ==
Seasons	W	L	Pct.	ERA	G	GS	CG	SHO	SV	IP	H	ER	R	HR	BB	K	WP	HBP	BAA	Fld%	Avg.	SH
10	70	90	.438	4.07	325	217	25	7	7	1435.1	1385	649	717	152	671	865	70	16	.257	.959	.149	43

In his career, Falcone kept batters to a .234 Batting Average with Runners in Scoring Position. He hit his only career home run off the Phillies' Mark Davis on September 29, 1981. He had 21 career runs batted in.

== Senior Professional Baseball Association ==
Falcone attempted a comeback with the Los Angeles Dodgers in 1989. After two appearances for the triple A Albuquerque Dukes in which he faced thirteen batters and recorded just four outs, he was demoted to the double A San Antonio Missions. He was ineffective in San Antonio as well, going 3–4 with a 5.65 ERA. After failing to make it back into the major leagues, Falcone decided to try his luck with the Orlando Juice of the Senior Professional Baseball Association for the rest of the year. He posted a 10–3 record. In 1990 he moved to the Sun City Rays, but less than halfway through its second season, the league folded on December 26.

== Italian Baseball League ==
In 1990, Falcone played in the Italian Baseball League for the Rimini Pirates. He pitched 23 games, going 18–4, with eleven complete games and two shutouts. He had the best ERA during the regular season (1.19) and led his team to the championship series, but lost a dramatic game seven against another former MLB pitcher, Bob Galasso.

== Personal life ==
Falcone's son, Joey, served two tours of duty in Iraq and one in Afghanistan as a Marine Corps medic. After six years serving overseas, the former Bolton High School right fielder returned to baseball in 2013 at the age of 26 years, serving as a designated hitter for Columbia University. In three seasons with Columbia, Joey batted .292 with sixteen home runs and ninety runs batted in. After which, he spent one season in the New York Yankees' farm system.

While playing with the Mets, Falcone was reunited with his cousin, Joe Pignatano, who was a coach with the club at the time.
