= Jay Kleven =

American baseball player (1949-2009)

- Catcher
- Born: December 2, 1949; Oakland, California, U.S.
- Died: June 30, 2009 (aged 59); San Lorenzo, California, U.S.
- Batted: Right Threw: Right

MLB debut
- June 20, 1976, for the New York Mets

Last MLB appearance
- June 27, 1976, for the New York Mets

MLB statistics
- Batting average: .200
- Home runs: 0
- Runs batted in: 2
- Stats at Baseball Reference

Teams
- New York Mets (1976)

Jay Allen Kleven (December 2, 1949 – June 30, 2009) was a Major League Baseball player in 1976 for the New York Mets. He played in 2 games as a catcher that year due to injuries to starting catcher Jerry Grote and second-string catcher Ron Hodges. Kleven singled in his next to final at bat as a major leaguer, going one for five for his career. This lone hit of his career drove in two runs against future Hall-of Famer Bruce Sutter.

Kleven attended California State University, East Bay in Hayward, California, where he played baseball from 1967–1971. He was named to the All Far Western First Team twice and is listed in the CSUEB Intercollegiate Athletics Hall of Fame.
