= Steve Waterbury =

American baseball player (1952–2017)

- Pitcher
- Born: April 6, 1952; Carbondale, Illinois, U.S.
- Died: May 19, 2017 (aged 65); Marion, Illinois, U.S.
- Batted: Right Threw: Right

MLB debut
- September 14, 1976, for the St. Louis Cardinals

Last MLB appearance
- September 27, 1976, for the St. Louis Cardinals

MLB statistics
- Win–loss record: 0–0
- ERA: 6.00
- Strikeouts: 4
- Stats at Baseball Reference

Teams
- St. Louis Cardinals (1976)

Steven Craig Waterbury (April 6, 1952 – May 19, 2017) was an American Major League Baseball pitcher. He batted and threw right-handed.

Waterbury signed with the St. Louis Cardinals as an amateur free agent in 1971. Knee surgery hampered his development, but he received a September callup to the majors in 1976 after going 46-56 with 599 strikeouts and a 3.94 earned run average as a starting pitcher in the Cardinals' farm system. He made his major league debut on September 14 against the Chicago Cubs, and pitched three innings of one hit ball before being lifted for a pinch hitter. He would appear in a total of five games for the Cards that year, all losses, but did not figure in the decision in any.

He was 4-2 with a 3.38 ERA in nine starts for the double A Arkansas Travelers when he & Bake McBride were traded to the Philadelphia Phillies for Tom Underwood, Rick Bosetti & Dane Iorg at the 1977 trade deadline. He finished out the season with the triple A Oklahoma City 89ers, going 6-3 with a 3.18 ERA. He would have his worst season in 1978, going 5-12 with a 6.73 ERA for Oklahoma. After which, the Phillies released him. He received an invitation to Spring training with the Cubs in 1979, but failed to make the club.

After his playing days ended, Waterbury became a police officer in Marion, Illinois. He died on May 19, 2017.
