= Joe Keener =

American baseball player (born 1953)

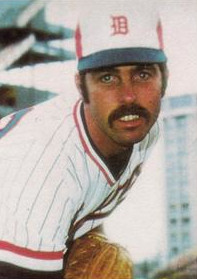
- Keener in 1978
- Pitcher
- Born: April 21, 1953 (age 72); San Pedro, California, U.S.
- Batted: Right Threw: Right

MLB debut
- September 18, 1976, for the Montreal Expos

Last MLB appearance
- September 28, 1976, for the Montreal Expos

MLB statistics
- Win–loss record: 0–1
- Earned run average: 10.38
- Strikeouts: 1
- Stats at Baseball Reference

Teams
- Montreal Expos (1976)

Joseph Donald Keener (born April 21, 1953) is an American former professional baseball pitcher who appeared in two games for the Montreal Expos of Major League Baseball in 1976. Born in San Pedro, California, Keener graduated from Quartz Hill High School and attended Antelope Valley College. He threw and batted right-handed and was listed as 6 feet 4 inches (1.93 m) tall and 200 pounds (91 kg).

Keener signed with Montreal as an undrafted free agent in 1973 and spent his full, seven-year professional career in the Expos' organization. His two MLB games, both starting pitcher assignments, came in the waning days of the Expos' 107-loss 1976 campaign. On September 18, at Jarry Park Stadium against the St. Louis Cardinals, he lasted only one-third of an inning, giving up three hits, four earned runs, three bases on balls, and a balk, and was charged with the Expos' eventual 7–4 loss. Eight days later, against the New York Mets at Shea Stadium, he permitted four hits, five bases on balls, and one earned run in four full innings, and did not earn a decision in Montreal's 5–4 setback.

Over his two major-league appearances, Keener posted a 0–1 record and 10.38 earned run average, allowing five earned runs in 41/3 innings pitched on seven hits and eight bases on balls; he struck out one. In the minor leagues, Keener posted a stellar 66–37 won–lost mark and .641 winning percentage, with four seasons of double-digit victories over his seven-year career.
