= Jake Brown (baseball, born 1948) =

American baseball player (1948-1981)

- Pinch hitter/Outfielder
- Born: March 22, 1948; Sumrall, Mississippi, U.S.
- Died: December 18, 1981 (aged 33); Houston, Texas, U.S.
- Batted: Right Threw: Right

MLB debut
- May 17, 1975, for the San Francisco Giants

Last MLB appearance
- September 28, 1975, for the San Francisco Giants

MLB statistics
- Batting average: .209
- Home runs: 0
- Runs batted in: 4

Teams
- San Francisco Giants (1975)

Jerald Ray "Jake" Brown (March 22, 1948 – December 18, 1981) was an American Major League Baseball player who played with the San Francisco Giants in 1975. He was used primarily as a pinch hitter, but also played the outfield.

Brown is most notable because he made it to the majors after nearly severing his left forearm in an industrial accident at a sheet-metal plant in early 1974.

Brown was just 33 years old when he died of leukemia in Houston, Texas on December 18, 1981.
