= 1976 Major League Baseball draft =

Baseball draft of amateur players

Overview
- First selection: Floyd Bannister; Houston Astros
- First round selections: 24
- Hall of Famers: 5: SS Alan Trammell; OF Rickey Henderson; P Jack Morris; SS Ozzie Smith; 3B Wade Boggs

The 1976 Major League Baseball draft took place prior to the 1976 MLB season. The draft saw the Houston Astros select Floyd Bannister first overall.

== First round selections ==
= All-Star	= Baseball Hall of Famer

The following are the first-round picks in the 1976 Major League Baseball draft.

Pick	Player	Team	Position	Hometown/School
1	Floyd Bannister	Houston Astros	LHP	Arizona State University
2	Pat Underwood	Detroit Tigers	LHP	Kokomo, Indiana
3	Ken Smith	Atlanta Braves	3B	Youngstown, Ohio
4	Bill Bordley	Milwaukee Brewers	LHP	Torrance, California
5	Bob Owchinko	San Diego Padres	LHP	Eastern Michigan University
6	Ken Landreaux	California Angels	OF	Arizona State University
7	Herm Segelke	Chicago Cubs	RHP	South Sacramento, California
8	Steve Trout	Chicago White Sox	LHP	South Holland, Illinois
9	Bob James	Montreal Expos	RHP	Sunland, California
10	Jamie Allen	Minnesota Twins	3B-RHP	Yakima, Washington
11	Mark Kuecker	San Francisco Giants	SS	Brenham, Texas
12	Billy Simpson	Texas Rangers	OF	Lakewood, California
13	Tom Thurberg	New York Mets	OF-RHP	South Weymouth, Massachusetts
14	Tim Glass	Cleveland Indians	C	Springfield, Ohio
15	Leon Durham	St. Louis Cardinals	1B	Cincinnati, Ohio
16	Pat Tabler	New York Yankees	OF	Cincinnati, Ohio
17	Jeff Kraus	Philadelphia Phillies	SS	Cincinnati, Ohio
18	Ben Grzybek	Kansas City Royals	RHP	Hialeah, Florida
19	Mike Scioscia	Los Angeles Dodgers	C	Morton, Pennsylvania
20	Dallas Williams	Baltimore Orioles	OF	Brooklyn, New York
21	Jim Parke	Pittsburgh Pirates	RHP	Sterling Heights, Michigan
22	Bruce Hurst	Boston Red Sox	LHP	St. George, Utah
23	Mark King	Cincinnati Reds	RHP	Owensboro, Kentucky
24	Thomas Sullivan*	Oakland Athletics	RHP	Woodbridge, Virginia

* Did not sign

== Other notable selections ==
= All-Star	= Baseball Hall of Famer

Round	Pick	Player	Team	Position
2	26	Alan Trammell	Detroit Tigers	Shortstop
2	37	Mike Scott	New York Mets	Pitcher
3	66	Rich Dubee	Kansas City Royals	Pitcher
4	74	Dan Petry	Detroit Tigers	Pitcher
4	96	Rickey Henderson	Oakland Athletics	Outfielder
5	98	Jack Morris	Detroit Tigers	Pitcher
5	99	Bruce Benedict	Atlanta Braves	Catcher
7	146	Ozzie Smith*	Detroit Tigers	Shortstop
7	152	Willie McGee*	Chicago White Sox	Outfielder
7	166	Wade Boggs	Boston Red Sox	Shortstop
8	169	Dave Smith	Houston Astros	Pitcher
8	172	Lary Sorensen	Milwaukee Brewers	Pitcher
11	253	Neil Allen	New York Mets	Pitcher
17	401	Scott Garrett*	Milwaukee Brewers	Second Baseman-Pitcher
17	405	Rick Honeycutt	Pittsburgh Pirates	First Baseman-Pitcher
18	422	Ron Hassey	Cleveland Indians	Catcher
22	518	Ray Searage	St. Louis Cardinals	Pitcher

* Did not sign

== Background ==
The 1976 Arizona State University team, considered by many to be the best collegiate team ever, played a major role in the draft. Floyd Bannister was picked number one by the Astros while Ken Landreaux was selected sixth by the Angels. In all, 12 players from that team went on to play in the majors.

Bannister and Landreaux anchored a June draft that was one of the most talented ever. The first 10 selections went on to play in the big leagues. Among those picked in the June draft were Rickey Henderson (Oakland), Alan Trammell, Jack Morris and Dan Petry (Detroit), Wade Boggs and Bruce Hurst (Boston), Steve Trout (Chicago White Sox), Leon Durham (St. Louis), and Pat Tabler (New York Yankees).

Willie McGee (Chicago White Sox) and Ozzie Smith (Detroit) were selected in the seventh round but did not sign. In the January phase, Steve Kemp of Southern California was picked first by the Tigers and Jody Davis was picked third by the Mets.

Preceded by Danny Goodwin	1st Overall Picks; Floyd Bannister	Succeeded by Harold Baines
