= 1977 Philadelphia Phillies season =

Major League Baseball season

1977 Philadelphia Phillies
- National League East champions
- League: National League
- Division: East
- Ballpark: Veterans Stadium
- City: Philadelphia
- Owners: R. R. M. "Ruly" Carpenter III
- General managers: Paul Owens
- Managers: Danny Ozark
- Television: WPHL-TV
- Radio: KYW (Harry Kalas, Richie Ashburn, Andy Musser)

The 1977 Philadelphia Phillies season was the 95th season in the history of the franchise. The Phillies won their second consecutive National League East title with a record of 101–61, five games over the Pittsburgh Pirates. The Phillies lost the NLCS to the Los Angeles Dodgers, three games to one. The Phillies were managed by Danny Ozark, as they played their home games at Veterans Stadium.

== Offseason ==
- November 2, 1976: Tony Taylor was released by the Phillies.
- December 6, 1976: Willie Hernández was drafted from the Phillies by the Chicago Cubs in the 1976 rule 5 draft.
- December 20, 1976: Johnny Oates and a player to be named later were traded by the Phillies to the Los Angeles Dodgers for Ted Sizemore. The Phillies completed the deal by sending Quency Hill to the Dodgers on January 4, 1977.
- March 26, 1977: Sergio Ferrer was traded by the Phillies to the New York Yankees for Kerry Dineen.

== Regular season ==
=== Season standings ===
NL East
| Team | W | L | Pct. | GB | Home | Road |
|---|---|---|---|---|---|---|
| Philadelphia Phillies | 101 | 61 | .623 | — | 60‍–‍21 | 41‍–‍40 |
| Pittsburgh Pirates | 96 | 66 | .593 | 5 | 58‍–‍23 | 38‍–‍43 |
| St. Louis Cardinals | 83 | 79 | .512 | 18 | 52‍–‍31 | 31‍–‍48 |
| Chicago Cubs | 81 | 81 | .500 | 20 | 46‍–‍35 | 35‍–‍46 |
| Montreal Expos | 75 | 87 | .463 | 26 | 38‍–‍43 | 37‍–‍44 |
| New York Mets | 64 | 98 | .395 | 37 | 35‍–‍44 | 29‍–‍54 |

=== Record vs. opponents ===
1977 National League record Sources:
| Team | ATL | CHC | CIN | HOU | LAD | MON | NYM | PHI | PIT | SD | SF | STL |
|---|---|---|---|---|---|---|---|---|---|---|---|---|
| Atlanta | — | 5–7 | 4–14 | 9–9 | 5–13 | 6–6 | 7–5 | 2–10 | 3–9 | 11–7 | 8–10 | 1–11 |
| Chicago | 7–5 | — | 7–5 | 6–6 | 6–6 | 10–8 | 9–9 | 6–12 | 7–11 | 7–5 | 9–3 | 7–11 |
| Cincinnati | 14–4 | 5–7 | — | 5–13 | 10–8 | 7–5 | 10–2 | 8–4 | 3–9 | 11–7 | 10–8 | 5–7 |
| Houston | 9–9 | 6–6 | 13–5 | — | 9–9 | 8–4 | 6–6 | 4–8 | 4–8 | 8–10 | 9–9 | 5–7 |
| Los Angeles | 13–5 | 6–6 | 8–10 | 9–9 | — | 7–5 | 8–4 | 6–6 | 9–3 | 12–6 | 14–4 | 6–6 |
| Montreal | 6–6 | 8–10 | 5–7 | 4–8 | 5–7 | — | 10–8 | 7–11 | 7–11 | 5–7 | 6–6 | 12–6 |
| New York | 5–7 | 9–9 | 2–10 | 6–6 | 4–8 | 8–10 | — | 5–13 | 4–14 | 6–6 | 7–5 | 8–10 |
| Philadelphia | 10-2 | 12–6 | 4–8 | 8–4 | 6–6 | 11–7 | 13–5 | — | 8–10 | 9–3 | 9–3 | 11–7 |
| Pittsburgh | 9–3 | 11–7 | 9–3 | 8–4 | 3–9 | 11–7 | 14–4 | 10–8 | — | 10–2 | 2–10 | 9–9 |
| San Diego | 7–11 | 5–7 | 7–11 | 10–8 | 6–12 | 7–5 | 6–6 | 3–9 | 2–10 | — | 8–10 | 8–4 |
| San Francisco | 10–8 | 3–9 | 8–10 | 9–9 | 4–14 | 6–6 | 5–7 | 3–9 | 10–2 | 10–8 | — | 7–5 |
| St. Louis | 11–1 | 11–7 | 7–5 | 7–5 | 6–6 | 6–12 | 10–8 | 7–11 | 9–9 | 4–8 | 5–7 | — |

=== Notable transactions ===
- June 15, 1977: Tom Underwood, Dane Iorg, and Rick Bosetti were traded by the Phillies to the St. Louis Cardinals for Bake McBride and Steve Waterbury.

==== Draft picks ====
- June 7, 1977: George Vukovich was drafted by the Phillies in the 4th round of the 1977 Major League Baseball draft. Player signed June 21, 1977.

=== 1977 game log ===
Legend
| | Phillies win |
| | Phillies loss |
| | Postponement |
| **Bold** | Phillies team member |

1977 Game Log
Overall Record: 101–61
April (7–9)

| # | Date | Opponent | Score | Win | Loss | Save | Attendance | Record |
|---|---|---|---|---|---|---|---|---|
| 1 | April 9 | Expos | 3–4 | Jackie Brown (1–0) | **Steve Carlton** (0–1) | None | 43,367 | 0–1 |
| 2 | April 10 | Expos | 8–9 | Bill Atkinson (1–0) | **Gene Garber** (0–1) | Joe Kerrigan (1) | 14,354 | 0–2 |
| 3 | April 11 | Cubs | 2–6 | Bill Bonham (1–0) | **Wayne Twitchell** (0–1) | None | 17,578 | 0–3 |
| 4 | April 13 | Cubs | 1–3 | Ray Burris (1–1) | **Randy Lerch** (0–1) | Bruce Sutter (2) | 16,434 | 0–4 |
| 5 | April 15 | @ Expos | 7–2 | **Steve Carlton** (1–1) | Don Stanhouse (0–1) | None | 57,592 | 1–4 |
| 6 | April 16 | @ Expos | 3–4 | Gerry Hannahs (1–0) | **Larry Christenson** (0–1) | Bill Atkinson (1) | 18,361 | 1–5 |
| 7 | April 17 | @ Expos | 1–2 | Will McEnaney (1–1) | **Gene Garber** (0–2) | None | 29,115 | 1–6 |
| 8 | April 18 | @ Cubs | 3–1 | **Randy Lerch** (1–1) | Ray Burris (1–2) | **Ron Reed** (1) | 3,777 | 2–6 |
| 9 | April 19 | @ Cubs | 7–5 | **Larry Christenson** (1–1) | Mike Krukow (0–1) | **Gene Garber** (1) | 2,413 | 3–6 |
| – | April 20 | @ Cubs | Postponed (rain); Makeup: August 14 as a traditional double-header | | | | | |
| 10 | April 22 | Cardinals | 1–10 | John Denny (4–0) | **Wayne Twitchell** (0–2) | None | 26,430 | 3–7 |
| 11 | April 23 | Cardinals | 11–1 | **Randy Lerch** (2–1) | Bob Forsch (3–1) | None | 27,642 | 4–7 |
| 12 | April 24 | Cardinals | 6–3 | **Steve Carlton** (2–1) | Pete Falcone (0–3) | None | 40,186 | 5–7 |
| 13 | April 26 | @ Pirates | 0–5 | John Candelaria (2–0) | **Larry Christenson** (1–2) | Rich Gossage (2) | 6,726 | 5–8 |
| 14 | April 27 | @ Pirates | 3–7 | Bruce Kison (2–1) | **Wayne Twitchell** (0–3) | None | 7,054 | 5–9 |
| 15 | April 29 | @ Giants | 6–5 | **Steve Carlton** (3–1) | Jim Barr (3–2) | **Ron Reed** (2) | 4,440 | 6–9 |
| 16 | April 30 | @ Giants | 6–4 | **Randy Lerch** (3–1) | Ed Halicki (2–2) | **Ron Reed** (3) | 6,216 | 7–9 |

May (18–10)

| # | Date | Opponent | Score | Win | Loss | Save | Attendance | Record |
|---|---|---|---|---|---|---|---|---|
| 17 | May 1 | @ Giants | 7–2 | **Larry Christenson** (2–2) | Lynn McGlothen (0–3) | None | 16,272 | 8–9 |
| 18 | May 2 | @ Padres | 3–4 | Rollie Fingers (3–1) | **Ron Reed** (0–1) | None | 16,112 | 8–10 |
| 19 | May 3 | @ Padres | 8–7 (10) | **Gene Garber** (1–2) | Victor Bernal (1–1) | None | 7,942 | 9–10 |
| 20 | May 4 | @ Padres | 1–4 | Randy Jones (2–4) | **Jim Kaat** (0–1) | None | 10,021 | 9–11 |
| 21 | May 5 | @ Padres | 8–5 | **Randy Lerch** (4–1) | Bob Shirley (2–4) | **Gene Garber** (2) | 7,810 | 10–11 |
| 22 | May 6 | @ Dodgers | 3–9 | Don Sutton (4–0) | **Larry Christenson** (2–3) | None | 51,368 | 10–12 |
| 23 | May 7 | @ Dodgers | 7–4 (13) | **Tom Underwood** (1–0) | Al Downing (0–1) | None | 38,910 | 11–12 |
| – | May 8 | @ Dodgers | Postponed (rain); Makeup: May 9 | | | | | |
| – | May 9 | @ Dodgers | Postponed (wet grounds); Makeup: July 26 as a traditional double-header | | | | | |
| 24 | May 10 | Giants | 3–0 | **Steve Carlton** (4–1) | Terry Cornutt (0–1) | None | 16,121 | 12–12 |
| 25 | May 11 | Giants | 2–4 | Lynn McGlothen (2–3) | **Randy Lerch** (4–2) | None | 18,482 | 12–13 |
| 26 | May 12 | Giants | 3–0 | **Larry Christenson** (3–3) | John Montefusco (2–5) | None | 23,103 | 13–13 |
| 27 | May 13 | Padres | 5–4 | **Ron Reed** (1–1) | Dave Tomlin (0–1) | **Gene Garber** (3) | 23,655 | 14–13 |
| 28 | May 14 | Padres | 9–5 | **Tom Underwood** (2–0) | Brent Strom (0–2) | **Gene Garber** (4) | 26,609 | 15–13 |
| 29 | May 15 | Padres | 6–3 | **Steve Carlton** (5–1) | Randy Jones (3–5) | None | 46,141 | 16–13 |
| 30 | May 16 | Dodgers | 10–6 | **Randy Lerch** (5–2) | Tommy John (3–2) | **Ron Reed** (4) | 28,036 | 17–13 |
| 31 | May 17 | Dodgers | 4–6 | Don Sutton (6–0) | **Larry Christenson** (3–4) | Charlie Hough (10) | 30,292 | 17–14 |
| 32 | May 18 | Dodgers | 4–6 | Rick Rhoden (6–1) | **Wayne Twitchell** (0–4) | Charlie Hough (11) | 30,132 | 17–15 |
| 33 | May 19 | @ Astros | 2–3 | Joaquín Andújar (3–3) | **Gene Garber** (1–3) | Joe Sambito (1) | 5,605 | 17–16 |
| 34 | May 20 | @ Astros | 2–5 | J. R. Richard (3–4) | **Steve Carlton** (5–2) | None | 8,892 | 17–17 |
| 35 | May 21 | @ Astros | 7–4 | **Ron Reed** (2–1) | Dan Larson (0–2) | None | 21,154 | 18–17 |
| 36 | May 22 | @ Astros | 6–3 | **Larry Christenson** (4–4) | Floyd Bannister (1–4) | **Warren Brusstar** (1) | 8,624 | 19–17 |
| 37 | May 24 | @ Cardinals | 5–8 | Bob Forsch (7–1) | **Jim Kaat** (0–2) | Al Hrabosky (5) | 11,415 | 19–18 |
| 38 | May 25 | @ Cardinals | 2–1 | **Steve Carlton** (6–2) | Pete Falcone (1–5) | **Tom Underwood** (1) | 12,401 | 20–18 |
| 39 | May 26 | @ Cardinals | 3–4 (10) | Butch Metzger (1–0) | **Ron Reed** (2–2) | None | 16,450 | 20–19 |
| 40 | May 27 | Mets | 5–4 | **Gene Garber** (2–3) | Skip Lockwood (0–2) | None | 28,365 | 21–19 |
| 41 | May 28 | Mets | 4–2 (10) | **Ron Reed** (3–2) | Skip Lockwood (0–3) | None | 31,234 | 22–19 |
| 42 | May 29 | Mets | 7–6 | **Jim Kaat** (1–2) | Jon Matlack (3–6) | **Gene Garber** (5) | 43,279 | 23–19 |
| 43 | May 30 | Pirates | 6–4 | **Steve Carlton** (7–2) | Bruce Kison (3–3) | None | 32,253 | 24–19 |
| 44 | May 31 | Pirates | 6–5 | **Ron Reed** (4–2) | Kent Tekulve (3–1) | None | 23,731 | 25–19 |

June (15–13)

| # | Date | Opponent | Score | Win | Loss | Save | Attendance | Record |
|---|---|---|---|---|---|---|---|---|
| 45 | June 1 | Pirates | 0–3 (8) | John Candelaria (7–1) | **Larry Christenson** (4–5) | None | 28,234 | 25–20 |
| 46 | June 3 | @ Mets | 1–0 | **Jim Lonborg** (1–0) | Jon Matlack (3–7) | **Ron Reed** (5) | 20,013 | 26–20 |
| 47 | June 4 | @ Mets | 0–2 | Nino Espinosa (3–4) | **Steve Carlton** (7–3) | Skip Lockwood (7) | 16,460 | 26–21 |
| 48 | June 5 (1) | @ Mets | 5–6 (10) | Bob Apodaca (1–2) | **Tom Underwood** (2–1) | None | see 2nd game | 26–22 |
| 49 | June 5 (2) | @ Mets | 2–3 | Craig Swan (3–4) | **Jim Kaat** (1–3) | Skip Lockwood (8) | 30,867 | 26–23 |
| 50 | June 6 | Astros | 9–5 (6) | **Larry Christenson** (5–5) | Bo McLaughlin (1–3) | **Warren Brusstar** (2) | 17,326 | 27–23 |
| 51 | June 7 | Astros | 9–8 | **Tom Underwood** (3–1) | Joe Niekro (0–1) | **Gene Garber** (6) | 25,226 | 28–23 |
| 52 | June 8 | Astros | 3–2 | **Steve Carlton** (8–3) | Mark Lemongello (1–9) | None | 23,388 | 29–23 |
| 53 | June 9 | @ Braves | 0–3 | Phil Niekro (4–8) | **Jim Kaat** (1–4) | None | 6,791 | 29–24 |
| 54 | June 10 | @ Braves | 7–5 | **Ron Reed** (5–2) | Dave Campbell (0–2) | **Gene Garber** (7) | 9,274 | 30–24 |
| 55 | June 11 | @ Braves | 13–10 | **Warren Brusstar** (1–0) | Buzz Capra (1–6) | **Gene Garber** (8) | 12,760 | 31–24 |
| 56 | June 12 | @ Braves | 3–5 | Rick Camp (4–1) | **Gene Garber** (2–4) | None | 15,716 | 31–25 |
| 57 | June 13 | @ Reds | 4–5 | Pedro Borbón (2–3) | **Wayne Twitchell** (0–5) | None | 27,147 | 31–26 |
| 58 | June 14 | @ Reds | 2–3 | Fred Norman (7–2) | **Jim Kaat** (1–5) | None | 30,036 | 31–27 |
| 59 | June 15 | @ Reds | 7–8 (10) | Pedro Borbón (3–3) | **Tom Underwood** (3–2) | None | 31,214 | 31–28 |
| 60 | June 17 | Braves | 11–5 | **Larry Christenson** (6–5) | Andy Messersmith (4–3) | **Ron Reed** (6) | 37,143 | 32–28 |
| 61 | June 18 | Braves | 8–5 (12) | **Tug McGraw** (1–0) | Frank LaCorte (1–7) | None | 32,016 | 33–28 |
| 62 | June 19 | Braves | 4–2 | **Steve Carlton** (9–3) | Steve Hargan (2–4) | None | 40,126 | 34–28 |
| 63 | June 20 | Reds | 10–4 | **Jim Kaat** (2–5) | Fred Norman (7–3) | None | 38,121 | 35–28 |
| 64 | June 21 | Reds | 5–10 | Pedro Borbón (4–3) | **Warren Brusstar** (1–1) | None | 45,091 | 35–29 |
| 65 | June 22 | Reds | 15–9 | **Tug McGraw** (2–0) | Tom Hume (0–3) | None | 47,148 | 36–29 |
| 66 | June 24 | @ Cardinals | 1–7 | Eric Rasmussen (6–8) | **Jim Lonborg** (1–1) | None | 17,885 | 36–30 |
| 67 | June 25 | @ Cardinals | 2–3 | Bob Forsch (9–4) | **Steve Carlton** (9–4) | Rawly Eastwick (8) | 33,244 | 36–31 |
| 68 | June 26 | @ Cardinals | 2–0 | **Jim Kaat** (3–5) | Larry Dierker (1–4) | **Gene Garber** (9) | 31,167 | 37–31 |
| 69 | June 27 | @ Mets | 4–2 | **Tug McGraw** (3–0) | Skip Lockwood (1–4) | None | 17,800 | 38–31 |
| 70 | June 28 | @ Mets | 3–1 | **Ron Reed** (6–2) | Rick Baldwin (1–1) | **Tug McGraw** (1) | 13,913 | 39–31 |
| 71 | June 29 | @ Mets | 3–5 | Jerry Koosman (6–8) | **Jim Lonborg** (1–2) | Skip Lockwood (11) | 12,434 | 39–32 |
| 72 | June 30 | Pirates | 8–1 | **Steve Carlton** (10–4) | Odell Jones (2–3) | None | 36,162 | 40–32 |

July (19–11)

| # | Date | Opponent | Score | Win | Loss | Save | Attendance | Record |
|---|---|---|---|---|---|---|---|---|
| 73 | July 1 | Pirates | 7–6 (14) | **Gene Garber** (3–4) | Grant Jackson (0–3) | None | 34,640 | 41–32 |
| 74 | July 2 | Pirates | 4–3 | **Warren Brusstar** (2–1) | Jerry Reuss (3–9) | **Ron Reed** (7) | 41,828 | 42–32 |
| 75 | July 3 | Pirates | 11–7 | **Larry Christenson** (7–5) | Bruce Kison (6–4) | None | 28,555 | 43–32 |
| 76 | July 4 | Mets | 3–1 | **Jim Lonborg** (2–2) | Jerry Koosman (6–9) | **Ron Reed** (8) | 63,283 | 44–32 |
| 77 | July 5 | Mets | 12–1 | **Steve Carlton** (11–4) | Pat Zachry (3–9) | None | 23,344 | 45–32 |
| 78 | July 6 | Mets | 5–3 | **Gene Garber** (4–4) | Jon Matlack (3–11) | **Tug McGraw** (2) | 23,185 | 46–32 |
| 79 | July 7 | Mets | 6–4 | **Warren Brusstar** (3–1) | Nino Espinosa (4–7) | **Ron Reed** (9) | 27,492 | 47–32 |
| 80 | July 8 | @ Pirates | 7–8 | Rich Gossage (7–5) | **Warren Brusstar** (3–2) | None | 25,200 | 47–33 |
| 81 | July 9 | @ Pirates | 8–9 (12) | Terry Forster (2–2) | **Gene Garber** (4–5) | None | 19,144 | 47–34 |
| 82 | July 10 (1) | @ Pirates | 1–5 | Jerry Reuss (4–9) | **Jim Lonborg** (2–3) | None | see 2nd game | 47–35 |
| 83 | July 10 (2) | @ Pirates | 10–12 | Grant Jackson (1–3) | **Ron Reed** (6–3) | Rich Gossage (15) | 39,042 | 47–36 |
| 84 | July 12 | Cardinals | 5–4 | **Randy Lerch** (6–2) | Rawly Eastwick (3–5) | None | 32,618 | 48–36 |
| 85 | July 13 | Cardinals | 5–2 | **Steve Carlton** (12–4) | Tom Underwood (5–5) | **Tug McGraw** (3) | 36,828 | 49–36 |
| 86 | July 14 | Cardinals | 6–7 (11) | Rawly Eastwick (4–5) | **Tug McGraw** (3–1) | Al Hrabosky (7) | 33,601 | 49–37 |
| 87 | July 15 (1) | Cubs | 4–2 | **Larry Christenson** (8–5) | Bill Bonham (9–9) | **Tug McGraw** (4) | see 2nd game | 50–37 |
| 88 | July 15 (2) | Cubs | 9–2 | **Jim Lonborg** (3–3) | Mike Krukow (7–7) | None | 61,177 | 51–37 |
| 89 | July 16 | Cubs | 8–9 | Pete Broberg (1–0) | **Ron Reed** (6–4) | Bruce Sutter (24) | 35,095 | 51–38 |
| 90 | July 17 | Cubs | 4–2 | **Steve Carlton** (13–4) | Ray Burris (10–9) | **Tug McGraw** (5) | 36,338 | 52–38 |
| – | July 19 | **1977 Major League Baseball All-Star Game at Yankee Stadium in New York City** | | | | | | |
| 91 | July 21 | @ Giants | 9–6 | **Jim Lonborg** (4–3) | Charlie Williams (4–3) | **Gene Garber** (10) | 5,771 | 53–38 |
| 92 | July 22 | @ Giants | 2–6 | John Montefusco (3–8) | **Steve Carlton** (13–5) | Gary Lavelle (14) | 6,064 | 53–39 |
| 93 | July 23 | @ Giants | 6–3 | **Larry Christenson** (9–5) | Bob Knepper (4–4) | **Tug McGraw** (6) | 7,958 | 54–39 |
| 94 | July 24 | @ Padres | 7–4 | **Jim Kaat** (4–5) | Bob Owchinko (3–6) | **Ron Reed** (10) | 12,695 | 55–39 |
| 95 | July 25 | @ Padres | 6–4 (12) | **Tug McGraw** (4–1) | Dan Spillner (5–1) | None | 10,999 | 56–39 |
| 96 | July 26 (1) | @ Dodgers | 1–5 | Rick Rhoden (11–7) | **Steve Carlton** (13–6) | Mike Garman (4) | see 2nd game | 56–40 |
| 97 | July 26 (2) | @ Dodgers | 5–1 | **Jim Lonborg** (5–3) | Burt Hooton (8–5) | None | 47,966 | 57–40 |
| 98 | July 27 | @ Dodgers | 5–7 | Lance Rautzhan (1–0) | **Tug McGraw** (4–2) | Mike Garman (5) | 38,571 | 57–41 |
| 99 | July 28 | @ Dodgers | 1–2 | Tommy John (11–4) | **Jim Kaat** (4–6) | None | 33,260 | 57–42 |
| 100 | July 29 | Giants | 0–7 | Jim Barr (10–7) | **Randy Lerch** (6–3) | None | 32,449 | 57–43 |
| 101 | July 30 | Giants | 9–3 | **Steve Carlton** (14–6) | Lynn McGlothen (2–8) | **Gene Garber** (11) | 35,197 | 58–43 |
| 102 | July 31 | Giants | 5–4 | **Tug McGraw** (5–2) | Gary Lavelle (6–5) | **Ron Reed** (11) | 42,013 | 59–43 |

August (22–7)

| # | Date | Opponent | Score | Win | Loss | Save | Attendance | Record |
|---|---|---|---|---|---|---|---|---|
| 103 | August 2 | Padres | 2–4 | Bob Owchinko (4–7) | **Jim Kaat** (4–7) | Rollie Fingers (23) | 30,204 | 59–44 |
| 104 | August 3 | Padres | 8–1 | **Steve Carlton** (15–6) | Bob Shirley (6–13) | None | 27,053 | 60–44 |
| 105 | August 4 | Padres | 2–1 (10) | **Tug McGraw** (6–2) | Dan Spillner (5–3) | None | 34,868 | 61–44 |
| 106 | August 5 | Dodgers | 8–3 | **Gene Garber** (5–5) | Lance Rautzhan (1–1) | None | 47,574 | 62–44 |
| 107 | August 6 | Dodgers | 1–0 | **Gene Garber** (6–5) | Burt Hooton (9–6) | None | 50,111 | 63–44 |
| 108 | August 7 | Dodgers | 3–1 | **Steve Carlton** (16–6) | Don Sutton (10–6) | None | 40,628 | 64–44 |
| 109 | August 10 (1) | Expos | 6–1 | **Larry Christenson** (10–5) | Steve Rogers (12–11) | None | see 2nd game | 65–44 |
| 110 | August 10 (2) | Expos | 6–1 | **Jim Lonborg** (6–3) | Santo Alcalá (3–7) | None | 46,664 | 66–44 |
| 111 | August 11 | Expos | 10–5 | **Jim Kaat** (5–7) | Jackie Brown (8–10) | **Gene Garber** (12) | 30,267 | 67–44 |
| 112 | August 12 | @ Cubs | 10–3 | **Steve Carlton** (17–6) | Rick Reuschel (15–5) | None | 28,849 | 68–44 |
| 113 | August 13 | @ Cubs | 10–7 (11) | **Ron Reed** (7–4) | Dave Giusti (3–4) | **Gene Garber** (13) | 27,126 | 69–44 |
| 114 | August 14 (1) | @ Cubs | 10–2 | **Larry Christenson** (11–5) | Mike Krukow (7–5) | None | see 2nd game | 70–44 |
| 115 | August 14 (2) | @ Cubs | 4–2 | **Jim Lonborg** (7–3) | Steve Renko (2–2) | **Ron Reed** (12) | 33,351 | 71–44 |
| 116 | August 16 | @ Expos | 7–5 | **Warren Brusstar** (4–2) | Joe Kerrigan (2–4) | **Gene Garber** (14) | 15,234 | 72–44 |
| 117 | August 17 | @ Expos | 0–13 | Stan Bahnsen (8–7) | **Steve Carlton** (17–7) | None | 22,398 | 72–45 |
| 118 | August 18 | @ Expos | 8–3 | **Jim Lonborg** (8–3) | Wayne Twitchell (2–9) | None | 18,296 | 73–45 |
| 119 | August 19 | Astros | 9–5 | **Larry Christenson** (12–5) | Joe Niekro (8–5) | None | 46,266 | 74–45 |
| 120 | August 20 | Astros | 5–4 | **Tug McGraw** (7–2) | Bo McLaughlin (3–6) | None | 47,048 | 75–45 |
| 121 | August 21 | Astros | 7–3 | **Steve Carlton** (18–7) | Mark Lemongello (5–14) | None | 46,852 | 76–45 |
| 122 | August 22 | @ Braves | 5–4 | **Jim Lonborg** (9–3) | Preston Hanna (0–2) | **Ron Reed** (13) | 5,711 | 77–45 |
| 123 | August 23 | @ Braves | 3–2 | **Randy Lerch** (7–3) | Phil Niekro (12–16) | **Tug McGraw** (7) | 5,972 | 78–45 |
| 124 | August 24 | @ Astros | 1–3 | Joe Niekro (9–5) | **Larry Christenson** (12–6) | None | 13,098 | 78–46 |
| 125 | August 25 | @ Astros | 5–6 | Gene Pentz (4–2) | **Ron Reed** (7–5) | Bo McLaughlin (5) | 11,802 | 78–47 |
| 126 | August 26 | @ Reds | 2–4 | Tom Seaver (15–5) | **Steve Carlton** (18–8) | None | 46,079 | 78–48 |
| 127 | August 27 | @ Reds | 5–6 | Jack Billingham (10–10) | **Tug McGraw** (7–3) | None | 46,139 | 78–49 |
| 128 | August 28 | @ Reds | 0–9 | Paul Moskau (4–4) | **Randy Lerch** (7–4) | None | 43,512 | 78–50 |
| 129 | August 29 | Braves | 3–2 (14) | **Gene Garber** (7–5) | Steve Hargan (2–6) | None | 36,263 | 79–50 |
| 130 | August 30 | Braves | 11–2 | **Jim Kaat** (6–7) | Preston Hanna (1–3) | None | 32,278 | 80–50 |
| 131 | August 31 | Braves | 6–1 | **Steve Carlton** (19–8) | Phil Niekro (13–17) | None | 29,102 | 81–50 |

September (19–10)

| # | Date | Opponent | Score | Win | Loss | Save | Attendance | Record |
|---|---|---|---|---|---|---|---|---|
| 132 | September 2 | Reds | 3–0 | **Jim Lonborg** (10–3) | Mario Soto (2–4) | None | 47,732 | 82–50 |
| 133 | September 3 | Reds | 9–3 | **Larry Christenson** (13–6) | Paul Moskau (4–5) | None | 55,062 | 83–50 |
| 134 | September 4 | Reds | 2–5 | Fred Norman (14–10) | **Jim Kaat** (6–8) | None | 40,051 | 83–51 |
| 135 | September 5 (1) | @ Pirates | 1–3 | John Candelaria (16–4) | **Randy Lerch** (7–5) | Rich Gossage (19) | see 2nd game | 83–52 |
| 136 | September 5 (2) | @ Pirates | 11–1 | **Steve Carlton** (20–8) | Bruce Kison (7–8) | None | 40,423 | 84–52 |
| 137 | September 6 | @ Pirates | 4–5 (11) | Rich Gossage (10–9) | **Gene Garber** (7–6) | None | 15,136 | 84–53 |
| 138 | September 7 | @ Mets | 6–2 | **Larry Christenson** (14–6) | Pat Zachry (8–13) | None | 7,783 | 85–53 |
| 139 | September 8 | @ Mets | 8–2 | **Gene Garber** (8–6) | Nino Espinosa (7–12) | **Tug McGraw** (8) | 3,186 | 86–53 |
| 140 | September 9 | Cardinals | 11–4 | **Steve Carlton** (21–8) | John Urrea (7–4) | None | 32,168 | 87–53 |
| 141 | September 10 | Cardinals | 3–1 | **Randy Lerch** (8–5) | Eric Rasmussen (10–15) | None | 43,112 | 88–53 |
| 142 | September 11 | Cardinals | 6–5 | **Warren Brusstar** (5–2) | John Sutton (0–1) | **Gene Garber** (15) | 49,108 | 89–53 |
| 143 | September 12 | Pirates | 6–2 | **Larry Christenson** (15–6) | Jerry Reuss (10–13) | None | 42,145 | 90–53 |
| 144 | September 13 | Pirates | 0–2 | Jim Rooker (12–9) | **Jim Kaat** (6–9) | Rich Gossage (21) | 42,638 | 90–54 |
| 145 | September 14 | Mets | 0–1 | Nino Espinosa (8–12) | **Steve Carlton** (21–9) | None | 25,119 | 90–55 |
| 146 | September 15 | Mets | 8–2 | **Randy Lerch** (9–5) | Craig Swan (8–9) | **Ron Reed** (14) | 25,314 | 91–55 |
| 147 | September 16 | @ Cardinals | 12–6 | **Warren Brusstar** (6–2) | John Denny (7–7) | **Gene Garber** (16) | 19,702 | 92–55 |
| 148 | September 17 | @ Cardinals | 8–4 | **Larry Christenson** (16–6) | Tom Underwood (8–11) | **Ron Reed** (15) | 22,574 | 93–55 |
| 149 | September 18 | @ Cardinals | 5–12 | Bob Forsch (18–6) | **Jim Kaat** (6–10) | None | 23,169 | 93–56 |
| 150 | September 20 | Cubs | 4–2 | **Steve Carlton** (22–9) | Bill Bonham (10–12) | None | 32,103 | 94–56 |
| 151 | September 21 | Cubs | 0–2 | Ray Burris (14–15) | **Randy Lerch** (9–6) | Bruce Sutter (29) | 31,512 | 94–57 |
| 152 | September 22 | Cubs | 3–5 | Paul Reuschel (5–6) | **Jim Lonborg** (10–4) | Bruce Sutter (30) | 20,709 | 94–58 |
| 153 | September 23 | @ Expos | 6–1 | **Larry Christenson** (17–6) | Steve Rogers (16–15) | **Gene Garber** (17) | 8,400 | 95–58 |
| 154 | September 24 | @ Expos | 1–0 | **Steve Carlton** (23–9) | Fred Holdsworth (2–4) | None | 23,098 | 96–58 |
| 155 | September 25 | @ Expos | 8–5 | **Warren Brusstar** (7–2) | Larry Landreth (0–2) | **Tug McGraw** (9) | 19,246 | 97–58 |
| 156 | September 26 | @ Cubs | 7–10 | Donnie Moore (4–2) | **Jim Kaat** (6–11) | Bruce Sutter (31) | 3,679 | 97–59 |
| 157 | September 27 | @ Cubs | 15–9 | **Larry Christenson** (18–6) | Bill Bonham (10–13) | None | 4,606 | 98–59 |
| 158 | September 28 | @ Cubs | 5–2 | **Randy Lerch** (10–6) | Mike Krukow (8–14) | **Warren Brusstar** (3) | 5,116 | 99–59 |
| 159 | September 29 | Expos | 2–7 | Fred Holdsworth (3–4) | **Steve Carlton** (23–10) | Don Stanhouse (10) | 25,808 | 99–60 |
| 160 | September 30 | Expos | 9–4 | **Jim Lonborg** (11–4) | Stan Bahnsen (9–11) | **Gene Garber** (18) | 28,436 | 100–60 |

October (1–1)

| # | Date | Opponent | Score | Win | Loss | Save | Attendance | Record |
|---|---|---|---|---|---|---|---|---|
| 161 | October 1 | Expos | 5–6 (12) | Joe Kerrigan (3–5) | **Dan Warthen** (2–4) | Bill Atkinson (7) | 43,095 | 100–61 |
| 162 | October 2 | Expos | 5–3 | **Larry Christenson** (19–6) | Steve Rogers (17–16) | **Gene Garber** (19) | 25,412 | 101–61 |

=== Roster ===
1977 Philadelphia Phillies
**Roster**
| **Pitchers**: 40 Warren Brusstar; 32 Steve Carlton; 38 Larry Christenson; 26 Gene Garber; 39 Jim Kaat; 47 Randy Lerch; 41 Jim Lonborg; 45 Tug McGraw; 42 Ron Reed; 35 Manny Seoane; 33 Wayne Twitchell; 34 Tom Underwood; 33 Dan Warthen | **Catchers**: 5 Tim Blackwell; 8 Bob Boone; 9 Barry Foote; 11 Tim McCarver; **Infielders**: 16 Fred Andrews; 10 Larry Bowa; 43 Mike Buskey; 17 Terry Harmon; 18 Richie Hebner; 14 Tommy Hutton; 22 Dane Iorg; 15 Davey Johnson; 30 Jim Morrison; 20 Mike Schmidt; 6 Ted Sizemore; 28 Bobby Tolan | **Outfielders**: 23 Ollie Brown; 21 Jay Johnstone; 19 Greg Luzinski; 31 Garry Maddox; 25 Jerry Martin; 22 Bake McBride; **Other batters**: 28 John Vukovich | **Manager**: 3 Danny Ozark; **Coaches**: 1 Carroll Beringer; 2 Billy DeMars; 4 Ray Rippelmeyer; 12 Tony Taylor (Hitting); 7 Bobby Wine |

== Player stats ==
| = Indicates team leader |

=== Batting ===
==== Starters by position ====
Note: Pos = Position; G = Games played; AB = At bats; H = Hits; Avg. = Batting average; HR = Home runs; RBI = Runs batted in

| Pos | Player | G | AB | H | Avg. | HR | RBI |
|---|---|---|---|---|---|---|---|
| C | Bob Boone | 132 | 440 | 125 | .284 | 11 | 66 |
| 1B | Richie Hebner | 118 | 397 | 113 | .285 | 18 | 62 |
| 2B | Ted Sizemore | 152 | 519 | 146 | .281 | 4 | 47 |
| SS | Larry Bowa | 154 | 624 | 175 | .280 | 4 | 41 |
| 3B | Mike Schmidt | 154 | 544 | 149 | .274 | 38 | 101 |
| LF | Greg Luzinski | 149 | 554 | 171 | .309 | 39 | 130 |
| CF | Garry Maddox | 139 | 571 | 167 | .292 | 14 | 74 |
| RF | Jay Johnstone | 112 | 363 | 103 | .284 | 15 | 59 |

==== Other batters ====
Note: G = Games played; AB = At bats; H = Hits; Avg. = Batting average; HR = Home runs; RBI = Runs batted in

| Player | G | AB | H | Avg. | HR | RBI |
|---|---|---|---|---|---|---|
| Bake McBride | 85 | 280 | 95 | .339 | 11 | 41 |
| Jerry Martin | 116 | 215 | 56 | .260 | 6 | 28 |
| Davey Johnson | 78 | 156 | 50 | .321 | 8 | 36 |
| Tommy Hutton | 107 | 81 | 25 | .309 | 2 | 11 |
| Ollie Brown | 53 | 70 | 17 | .243 | 1 | 13 |
| Terry Harmon | 46 | 60 | 11 | .183 | 2 | 5 |
| Barry Foote | 18 | 32 | 7 | .219 | 1 | 3 |
| Dane Iorg | 12 | 30 | 5 | .167 | 0 | 2 |
| Fred Andrews | 12 | 23 | 4 | .174 | 0 | 2 |
| Bobby Tolan | 15 | 16 | 2 | .125 | 0 | 1 |
| Mike Buskey | 6 | 7 | 2 | .286 | 0 | 1 |
| Jim Morrison | 5 | 7 | 3 | .429 | 0 | 1 |
| John Vukovich | 2 | 2 | 0 | .000 | 0 | 0 |
| Tim Blackwell | 1 | 0 | 0 | ---- | 0 | 0 |

=== Pitching ===
| = Indicates league leader |

==== Starting pitchers ====
Note: G = Games pitched; IP = Innings pitched; W = Wins; L = Losses; ERA = Earned run average; SO = Strikeouts

| Player | G | IP | W | L | ERA | SO |
|---|---|---|---|---|---|---|
| Steve Carlton | 36 | 283.0 | 23 | 10 | 2.64 | 198 |
| Larry Christenson | 34 | 219.1 | 19 | 6 | 4.06 | 118 |
| Randy Lerch | 32 | 168.2 | 10 | 6 | 5.07 | 81 |
| Jim Kaat | 35 | 160.1 | 6 | 11 | 5.39 | 55 |
| Jim Lonborg | 25 | 157.2 | 11 | 4 | 4.11 | 76 |

==== Other pitchers ====
Note: G = Games pitched; IP = Innings pitched; W = Wins; L = Losses; ERA = Earned run average; SO = Strikeouts

| Player | G | IP | W | L | ERA | SO |
|---|---|---|---|---|---|---|
| Wayne Twitchell | 12 | 45.2 | 0 | 5 | 4.53 | 37 |
| Manny Seoane | 2 | 6.0 | 0 | 0 | 6.00 | 4 |

==== Relief pitchers ====
Note: G = Games pitched; W = Wins; L = Losses; SV = Saves; ERA = Earned run average; SO = Strikeouts

| Player | G | W | L | SV | ERA | SO |
|---|---|---|---|---|---|---|
| Gene Garber | 64 | 8 | 6 | 19 | 2.35 | 78 |
| Ron Reed | 60 | 7 | 5 | 15 | 2.75 | 84 |
| Warren Brusstar | 46 | 7 | 2 | 3 | 2.65 | 46 |
| Tug McGraw | 45 | 7 | 3 | 9 | 2.62 | 58 |
| Tom Underwood | 14 | 3 | 2 | 1 | 5.13 | 20 |
| Dan Warthen | 3 | 0 | 1 | 0 | 0.00 | 1 |

== 1977 National League Championship Series ==
The Los Angeles Dodgers defeated the Philadelphia Phillies, 3 games to 1.

| Game | Score | Date | Location | Attendance |
|---|---|---|---|---|
| 1 | **Philadelphia** – 7, Los Angeles – 5 | October 4 | Dodger Stadium | 55,968 |
| 2 | Philadelphia – 1, **Los Angeles** – 7 | October 5 | Dodger Stadium | 55,973 |
| 3 | **Los Angeles** – 6, Philadelphia – 5 | October 7 | Veterans Stadium | 63,719 |
| 4 | **Los Angeles** – 4, Philadelphia – 1 | October 8 | Veterans Stadium | 64,924 |

=== 1977 postseason game log ===
Legend
| | Phillies win |
| | Phillies loss |
| | Postponement |
| **Bold** | Phillies team member |

1977 Postseason Game Log
Overall Record: 1–3
National League Championship Series (1–3)

| # | Date | Opponent | Score | Win | Loss | Save | Attendance | Record |
|---|---|---|---|---|---|---|---|---|
| 1 | October 4 | @ Dodgers | 7–5 | **Gene Garber** (1–0) | Elías Sosa (0–1) | **Tug McGraw** (1) | 55,968 | 1–0 |
| 2 | October 5 | @ Dodgers | 1–7 | Don Sutton (1–0) | **Jim Lonborg** (0–1) | None | 55,973 | 1–1 |
| 3 | October 7 | Dodgers | 5–6 | Lance Rautzhan (1–0) | **Gene Garber** (1–1) | Mike Garman (1) | 63,719 | 1–2 |
| 4 | October 8 | Dodgers | 1–4 | Tommy John (1–0) | **Steve Carlton** (0–1) | None | 64,924 | 1–3 |

== Farm system ==
| Level | Team | League | Manager |
|---|---|---|---|
| AAA | Oklahoma City 89ers | American Association | Cal Emery, Billy Connors and Mike Ryan |
| AA | Reading Phillies | Eastern League | Lee Elia |
| A | Peninsula Pilots | Carolina League | Jim Snyder |
| A | Spartanburg Phillies | Western Carolinas League | Mike Compton |
| A-Short Season | Auburn Phillies | New York–Penn League | Rubén Amaro, Sr. |

LEAGUE CHAMPIONS: Peninsula
