= 1977 Montreal Expos season =

1977 Montreal Expos
- League: National League
- Division: East
- Ballpark: Olympic Stadium
- City: Montreal
- Record: 75–87 (.463)
- Divisional place: 5th
- Owners: Charles Bronfman
- General managers: Charlie Fox
- Managers: Dick Williams
- Television: CBC Television (Dave Van Horne, Duke Snider); Télévision de Radio-Canada (Jean-Pierre Roy, Guy Ferron)
- Radio: CFCF (English) (Dave Van Horne, Duke Snider); CKAC (French) (Claude Raymond, Jacques Doucet)

The 1977 Montreal Expos season was the ninth season in the history of the franchise. The team finished fifth in the National League East with a record of 75–87, 26 games behind the Philadelphia Phillies. This was the Expos' first year in Olympic Stadium, after playing their first eight seasons at Jarry Park.

== Offseason ==
- November 6, 1976: Pat Scanlon, Steve Dunning, and Tony Scott were traded to the St. Louis Cardinals for Bill Greif, Ángel Torres and Sam Mejías.
- December 6, 1976: Roger Freed was drafted from the Expos by the St. Louis Cardinals in the 1976 rule 5 draft.
- December 10, 1976: Andre Thornton was traded to the Cleveland Indians for Jackie Brown.
- December 16, 1976: Woodie Fryman and Dale Murray were traded to the Cincinnati Reds for Tony Pérez and Will McEnaney.
- March 15, 1977: Rodney Scott was traded to the Texas Rangers for Jeff Terpko.

== Spring training ==
The Expos held spring training at City Island Ball Park in Daytona Beach, Florida, their fifth season there.

== Regular season ==
- April 15: The Expos set an attendance record for a regular season game as 57,592 fans attend the first game at Olympic Stadium. They were defeated 7 to 2 by the eventual National League East Champion Philadelphia Phillies. Ellis Valentine of the Expos homered in the third inning for the first home run at the Expos' new home.
- April 20: Catcher Gary Carter hit three home runs in one game.

=== Opening Day starters ===
- Gary Carter
- Dave Cash
- Warren Cromartie
- Andre Dawson
- Tim Foli
- Larry Parrish
- Tony Pérez
- Don Stanhouse
- Ellis Valentine

=== Season standings ===
NL East
Team	W	L	Pct.	GB	Home	Road
Philadelphia Phillies	101	61	.623	—	60‍–‍21	41‍–‍40
Pittsburgh Pirates	96	66	.593	5	58‍–‍23	38‍–‍43
St. Louis Cardinals	83	79	.512	18	52‍–‍31	31‍–‍48
Chicago Cubs	81	81	.500	20	46‍–‍35	35‍–‍46
Montreal Expos	75	87	.463	26	38‍–‍43	37‍–‍44
New York Mets	64	98	.395	37	35‍–‍44	29‍–‍54

=== Record vs. opponents ===
1977 National League record Sources:
Team	ATL	CHC	CIN	HOU	LAD	MON	NYM	PHI	PIT	SD	SF	STL
Atlanta	—	5–7	4–14	9–9	5–13	6–6	7–5	2–10	3–9	11–7	8–10	1–11
Chicago	7–5	—	7–5	6–6	6–6	10–8	9–9	6–12	7–11	7–5	9–3	7–11
Cincinnati	14–4	5–7	—	5–13	10–8	7–5	10–2	8–4	3–9	11–7	10–8	5–7
Houston	9–9	6–6	13–5	—	9–9	8–4	6–6	4–8	4–8	8–10	9–9	5–7
Los Angeles	13–5	6–6	8–10	9–9	—	7–5	8–4	6–6	9–3	12–6	14–4	6–6
Montreal	6–6	8–10	5–7	4–8	5–7	—	10–8	7–11	7–11	5–7	6–6	12–6
New York	5–7	9–9	2–10	6–6	4–8	8–10	—	5–13	4–14	6–6	7–5	8–10
Philadelphia	10-2	12–6	4–8	8–4	6–6	11–7	13–5	—	8–10	9–3	9–3	11–7
Pittsburgh	9–3	11–7	9–3	8–4	3–9	11–7	14–4	10–8	—	10–2	2–10	9–9
San Diego	7–11	5–7	7–11	10–8	6–12	7–5	6–6	3–9	2–10	—	8–10	8–4
San Francisco	10–8	3–9	8–10	9–9	4–14	6–6	5–7	3–9	10–2	10–8	—	7–5
St. Louis	11–1	11–7	7–5	7–5	6–6	6–12	10–8	7–11	9–9	4–8	5–7	—

=== Notable transactions ===
- April 6: Don Carrithers was purchased by the Minnesota Twins.
- April 10: Tom Walker was signed as a free agent.
- June 7: 1977 Major League Baseball draft
  - Bill Gullickson was selected in the 1st round (2nd pick).
  - Scott Sanderson was selected in the 3rd round.
  - Tim Raines was selected in the 5th round.
- June 22: Joe Pettini was signed as an amateur free agent.
- July 13: Tom Walker was purchased by the California Angels.

=== Roster ===
1977 Montreal Expos
Roster
Pitchers: 32 Santo Alcalá; 42 Bill Atkinson; 22 Stan Bahnsen; 31 Jackie Brown; 28 Hal Dues; 35 Gerry Hannahs; 16 Fred Holdsworth; 18 Joe Kerrigan; 21 Larry Landreth; 20 Will McEnaney; 45 Steve Rogers; 43 Dan Schatzeder; 26 Don Stanhouse; 48 Jeff Terpko; 33 Wayne Twitchell; 16 Tom Walker; 39 Dan Warthen	Catchers: 44 Tim Blackwell; 8 Gary Carter; 9 Barry Foote; 34 José Morales; Infielders: 30 Dave Cash; 19 Tim Foli; 38 Pepe Frías; 11 Wayne Garrett; 16 Mike Jorgensen; 5 Pete Mackanin; 12 Stan Papi; 15 Larry Parrish; 24 Tony Pérez; 4 Chris Speier	Outfielders: 49 Warren Cromartie; 10 Andre Dawson; 14 Sam Mejías; 25 Del Unser; 17 Ellis Valentine; 37 Jerry White	Manager: 23 Dick Williams; Coaches: 2 Jim Brewer (Pitching); 6 Billy Gardner (First Base); 3 Mickey Vernon (Hitting); 1 Ozzie Virgil (Third Base)

== Player stats ==
= Indicates team leader

=== Batting ===
==== Starters by position ====
Note: Pos = Position; G = Games played; AB = At bats; H = Hits; Avg. = Batting average; HR = Home runs; RBI = Runs batted in

Pos	Player	G	AB	H	Avg.	HR	RBI
C	Gary Carter	154	522	148	.284	31	84
1B	Tony Pérez	154	559	158	.283	19	91
2B	Dave Cash	153	650	188	.289	0	43
SS	Chris Speier	139	531	125	.235	5	38
3B	Larry Parrish	123	402	99	.246	11	46
LF	Warren Cromartie	155	620	175	.282	5	50
CF	Andre Dawson	139	525	148	.282	19	65
RF	Ellis Valentine	127	508	149	.293	25	76

==== Other batters ====
Note: G = Games played; AB = At bats; H = Hits; Avg. = Batting average; HR = Home runs; RBI = Runs batted in

Player	G	AB	H	Avg.	HR	RBI
Del Unser	113	289	79	.273	12	40
Wayne Garrett	68	159	43	.270	2	22
Sam Mejías	74	101	23	.228	3	8
Pete Mackanin	55	85	19	.224	1	6
José Morales	65	74	15	.203	1	9
Pepe Frías	53	70	18	.257	0	5
Tim Foli	13	57	10	.175	0	3
Barry Foote	15	49	12	.245	2	8
Stan Papi	13	43	10	.233	0	4
Tim Blackwell	16	22	2	.091	0	0
Jerry White	16	21	4	.190	0	1
Mike Jorgensen	19	20	4	.200	0	0

=== Pitching ===
= Indicates franchise record

==== Starting pitchers ====
Note: G = Games pitched; IP = Innings pitched; W = Wins; L = Losses; ERA = Earned run average; SO = Strikeouts

Player	G	IP	W	L	ERA	SO
Steve Rogers	40	301.2	17	16	3.10	206
Wayne Twitchell	22	139.0	6	5	4.21	93
Stan Bahnsen	23	127.2	8	9	4.81	58
Gerry Hannahs	8	37.0	1	5	4.86	21

==== Other pitchers ====
Note: G = Games pitched; IP = Innings pitched; W = Wins; L = Losses; ERA = Earned run average; SO = Strikeouts

Player	G	IP	W	L	ERA	SO
Jackie Brown	42	185.2	9	12	4.51	89
Don Stanhouse	47	158.1	10	10	3.41	89
Santo Alcalá	32	101.2	2	6	4.69	64
Fred Holdsworth	14	42.1	3	3	3.19	21
Dan Warthen	12	35.0	2	3	7.97	26
Hal Dues	6	23.0	1	1	4.30	9
Dan Schatzeder	6	21.2	2	1	2.49	14
Larry Landreth	4	9.1	0	2	9.64	5

==== Relief pitchers ====
Note: G = Games pitched; W = Wins; L = Losses; SV = Saves; ERA = Earned run average; SO = Strikeouts

Player	G	W	L	SV	ERA	SO
Joe Kerrigan	66	3	5	11	3.22	43
Will McEnaney	69	3	5	3	3.95	38
Bill Atkinson	55	7	2	7	3.35	56
Jeff Terpko	13	0	1	0	5.66	14
Tom Walker	11	1	1	0	4.74	10

== Award winners ==
1977 Major League Baseball All-Star Game

- Ellis Valentine, reserve

== Farm system ==
Level	Team	League	Manager
AAA	Denver Bears	American Association	Jim Marshall
AA	Québec Métros	Eastern League	Doc Edwards
A	West Palm Beach Expos	Florida State League	Felipe Alou
A-Short Season	Jamestown Expos	New York–Penn League	Pat Daugherty
Rookie	GCL Expos	Gulf Coast League	Ray Bellino

LEAGUE CHAMPIONS: Denver
