= 1977 Pittsburgh Pirates season =

1977 Pittsburgh Pirates
- League: National League
- Division: East
- Ballpark: Three Rivers Stadium
- City: Pittsburgh, Pennsylvania
- Record: 96–66 (.593)
- Divisional place: 2nd
- Owners: John W. Galbreath (majority shareholder); Bing Crosby, Thomas P. Johnson (minority shareholders)
- General managers: Harding "Pete" Peterson
- Managers: Chuck Tanner
- Television: KDKA-TV; Milo Hamilton, Lanny Frattare
- Radio: KDKA; Milo Hamilton, Lanny Frattare

The 1977 Pittsburgh Pirates season was the 96th season of the Pittsburgh Pirates franchise; their 91st in the National League. The Pirates finished second in the National League East with a record of 96–66. This was the first season where the player's last names appeared on the back of the jerseys.

== Offseason ==
- November 5, 1976: Manny Sanguillén was traded by the Pirates to the Oakland Athletics for manager Chuck Tanner.
- December 10, 1976: Richie Zisk and Silvio Martínez were traded by the Pirates to the Chicago White Sox for Goose Gossage and Terry Forster.
- March 15, 1977: Rick Langford, Tony Armas, Doug Bair, Dave Giusti, Doc Medich, and Mitchell Page were traded by the Pirates to the Oakland Athletics for Phil Garner, Tommy Helms, and Chris Batton.

== Regular season ==
- May 11: Atlanta Braves owner Ted Turner appointed himself manager of the team before a game against the Pirates. After losing the game 2–1, Turner stepped down.
- June 30: Willie Stargell hits his 400th career home run versus the Philadelphia Phillies.

=== Season standings ===
NL East
Team	W	L	Pct.	GB	Home	Road
Philadelphia Phillies	101	61	.623	—	60‍–‍21	41‍–‍40
Pittsburgh Pirates	96	66	.593	5	58‍–‍23	38‍–‍43
St. Louis Cardinals	83	79	.512	18	52‍–‍31	31‍–‍48
Chicago Cubs	81	81	.500	20	46‍–‍35	35‍–‍46
Montreal Expos	75	87	.463	26	38‍–‍43	37‍–‍44
New York Mets	64	98	.395	37	35‍–‍44	29‍–‍54

=== Record vs. opponents ===
1977 National League record Sources:
Team	ATL	CHC	CIN	HOU	LAD	MON	NYM	PHI	PIT	SD	SF	STL
Atlanta	—	5–7	4–14	9–9	5–13	6–6	7–5	2–10	3–9	11–7	8–10	1–11
Chicago	7–5	—	7–5	6–6	6–6	10–8	9–9	6–12	7–11	7–5	9–3	7–11
Cincinnati	14–4	5–7	—	5–13	10–8	7–5	10–2	8–4	3–9	11–7	10–8	5–7
Houston	9–9	6–6	13–5	—	9–9	8–4	6–6	4–8	4–8	8–10	9–9	5–7
Los Angeles	13–5	6–6	8–10	9–9	—	7–5	8–4	6–6	9–3	12–6	14–4	6–6
Montreal	6–6	8–10	5–7	4–8	5–7	—	10–8	7–11	7–11	5–7	6–6	12–6
New York	5–7	9–9	2–10	6–6	4–8	8–10	—	5–13	4–14	6–6	7–5	8–10
Philadelphia	10-2	12–6	4–8	8–4	6–6	11–7	13–5	—	8–10	9–3	9–3	11–7
Pittsburgh	9–3	11–7	9–3	8–4	3–9	11–7	14–4	10–8	—	10–2	2–10	9–9
San Diego	7–11	5–7	7–11	10–8	6–12	7–5	6–6	3–9	2–10	—	8–10	8–4
San Francisco	10–8	3–9	8–10	9–9	4–14	6–6	5–7	3–9	10–2	10–8	—	7–5
St. Louis	11–1	11–7	7–5	7–5	6–6	6–12	10–8	7–11	9–9	4–8	5–7	—

=== Game log ===
1977 Game Log: 95–66 (Home: 57–23; Away: 38–43)
April: 10–7 (Home: 5–4; Away: 5–3)

#	Date	Opponent	Score	Win	Loss	Save	Attendance	Record
1	April 7	Cardinals	6–12	Denny	**Reuss** (0–1)	—	35,186	0–1
2	April 9	Cardinals	2–8	Forsch	**Kison** (0–1)	—	6,719	0–2
3	April 10	Cardinals	7–8	Carroll	**Rooker** (0–1)	Urrea	5,223	0–3
4	April 12	Expos	2–1	**Gossage** (1–0)	McEnaney	—	4,042	1–3
5	April 13	Expos	3–0	**Kison** (1–1)	Rogers	—	4,586	2–3
6	April 15	@ Cardinals	7–0	**Rooker** (1–1)	Falcone	—	41,226	3–3
7	April 16	@ Cardinals	3–1	**Candelaria** (1–0)	Rasmussen	**Gossage** (1)	12,513	4–3
8	April 17	@ Cardinals	3–4	Denny	**Reuss** (0–2)	Urrea	28,574	4–4
9	April 18	@ Expos	5–6 (14)	Atkinson	**Jones** (0–1)	—	10,911	4–5
10	April 19	@ Expos	0–6	Stanhouse	**Demery** (0–1)	—	10,062	4–6
11	April 20	@ Expos	8–6	**Rooker** (2–1)	Hannahs	**Tekulve** (1)	12,607	5–6
12	April 22	@ Mets	4–3	**Tekulve** (1–0)	Myrick	—	19,495	6–6
13	April 23	@ Mets	6–5	**Gossage** (2–0)	Sadecki	—	9,040	7–6
14	April 26	Phillies	5–0	**Candelaria** (2–0)	Christenson	**Gossage** (2)	6,726	8–6
15	April 27	Phillies	7–3	**Kison** (2–1)	Twitchell	—	7,054	9–6
16	April 29	Astros	3–11	Bannister	**Reuss** (0–3)	—	7,186	9–7
17	April 30	Astros	10–0	**Rooker** (3–1)	Konieczny	—	6,540	10–7

May: 16–10 (Home: 10–3; Away: 6–7)

#	Date	Opponent	Score	Win	Loss	Save	Attendance	Record
18	May 1	Astros	4–3 (10)	**Gossage** (3–0)	Forsch	—	25,371	11–7
19	May 2	@ Braves	11–1	**Kison** (3–1)	Capra	—	9,148	12–7
20	May 3	@ Braves	8–7 (11)	**Tekulve** (2–0)	Niekro	**Jackson** (1)	7,977	13–7
21	May 4	@ Braves	8–0	**Demery** (1–1)	LaCorte	—	3,890	14–7
22	May 6	Reds	6–3	**Candelaria** (3–0)	Billingham	**Gossage** (3)	16,258	15–7
23	May 7	Reds	12–10	**Forster** (1–0)	Zachry	**Tekulve** (2)	16,799	16–7
24	May 8	Reds	6–4	**Jones** (1–1)	Norman	**Gossage** (4)	27,003	17–7
25	May 10	Braves	3–0	**Rooker** (4–1)	Capra	**Tekulve** (3)		18–7
26	May 10	Braves	2–1	**Demery** (2–1)	Collins	**Gossage** (5)	5,713	19–7
27	May 11	Braves	2–1	**Candelaria** (4–0)	Niekro	**Gossage** (6)	6,816	20–7
28	May 12	Braves	1–6	Leon	**Kison** (3–2)	—	10,161	20–8
29	May 13	@ Astros	0–3	Lemongello	**Reuss** (0–4)	Forsch	10,512	20–9
30	May 14	@ Astros	6–2	**Demery** (3–1)	Andujar	**Gossage** (7)	25,152	21–9
31	May 15	@ Astros	3–1	**Tekulve** (3–0)	Richard	—	9,340	22–9
32	May 17	@ Reds	3–0	**Candelaria** (5–0)	Billingham	**Gossage** (8)	30,575	23–9
33	May 18	@ Reds	3–8	Norman	**Reuss** (0–5)	Borbon	28,011	23–10
34	May 19	Dodgers	6–5 (10)	**Gossage** (4–0)	Hough	—	17,988	24–10
35	May 20	Dodgers	1–6	Hooton	**Demery** (3–2)	—	34,943	24–11
36	May 21	Dodgers	3–4	John	**Rooker** (4–2)	—	32,674	24–12
37	May 22	Dodgers	11–4	**Candelaria** (6–0)	Sutton	—	30,583	25–12
38	May 24	Mets	5–2	**Reuss** (1–5)	Matlack	**Forster** (1)	9,309	26–12
39	May 27	@ Cubs	2–4	Bonham	**Candelaria** (6–1)	Sutter	14,593	26–13
40	May 28	@ Cubs	3–6	Reuschel	**Rooker** (4–3)	Sutter	34,779	26–14
41	May 29	@ Cubs	2–3	Hernandez	**Gossage** (4–1)	Sutter	39,517	26–15
42	May 30	@ Phillies	4–6	Carlton	**Kison** (3–3)	—	32,253	26–16
43	May 31	@ Phillies	5–6	Reed	**Tekulve** (3–1)	—	23,731	26–17

June: 12–17 (Home: 7–6; Away: 5–11)

#	Date	Opponent	Score	Win	Loss	Save	Attendance	Record
44	June 1	@ Phillies	3–0 (8)	**Candelaria** (7–1)	Christenson	—	28,234	27–17
45	June 3	Cubs	5–0	**Rooker** (5–3)	Burris	—	20,152	28–17
46	June 4	Cubs	3–4	Krukow	**Reuss** (1–6)	Sutter	26,202	28–18
47	June 5	Cubs	5–4	**Jones** (2–1)	Bonham	**Gossage** (9)	51,580	29–18
48	June 6	Giants	1–3 (12)	Lavelle	**Gossage** (4–2)	—	6,635	29–19
49	June 7	Giants	6–7	Barr	**Demery** (3–3)	Moffitt	6,795	29–20
50	June 8	Giants	2–3	Curtis	**Rooker** (5–4)	Lavelle	6,995	29–21
51	June 10	Padres	10–7 (11)	Gossage	Fingers	—	10,499	29–21
52	June 11	Padres	1–4	Shirley	**Candelaria** (7–2)	Fingers	11,262	29–22
53	June 12	Padres	6–1	**Reuss** (2–6)	Jones	—		30–22
54	June 12	Padres	7–4	**Kison** (4–3)	Sawyer	**Gossage** (10)	21,640	31–22
55	June 14	@ Dodgers	2–3	Wall	**Gossage** (4–3)	—	36,122	31–23
56	June 15	@ Dodgers	1–10	Rhoden	**Jones** (2–2)	—	32,436	31–24
57	June 16	@ Dodgers	2–3 (11)	Hough	**Gossage** (4–4)	—	34,350	31–25
58	June 17	@ Giants	3–4	Heaverlo	**Reuss** (2–7)	Lavelle	4,789	31–26
59	June 18	@ Giants	5–7 (12)	Moffitt	**Forster** (1–1)	—	10,231	31–27
60	June 19	@ Giants	0–8	Knepper	**Rooker** (5–5)	—		31–28
61	June 19	@ Giants	6–8	Heaverlo	**Jackson** (0–1)	Moffitt	23,078	31–29
62	June 20	@ Padres	5–3	**Tekulve** (4–1)	Shirley	**Gossage** (11)	26,030	32–29
63	June 21	@ Padres	9–2	**Candelaria** (8–2)	Tomlin	—	14,265	33–29
64	June 22	@ Padres	3–1	**Reuss** (3–7)	Griffin	**Gossage** (12)	14,624	34–29
65	June 24	Expos	6–5 (10)	**Gossage** (5–4)	Kerrigan	—	27,650	35–29
66	June 25	Expos	10–2	**Kison** (5–3)	Brown	—	7,721	36–29
67	June 26	Expos	7–4	**Tekulve** (5–1)	Rogers	**Gossage** (13)		37–29
68	June 26	Expos	3–6	McEnaney	**Gossage** (5–5)	—	20,583	37–30
69	June 27	@ Cardinals	1–6	Falcone	**Reuss** (3–8)	—	18,239	37–31
70	June 28	@ Cardinals	1–6	Schultz	**Forster** (1–2)	—		37–32
71	June 28	@ Cardinals	3–13	Underwood	**Jackson** (0–2)	—	33,997	37–33
72	June 29	@ Cardinals	9–1	**Kison** (6–3)	Rasmussen	—	15,248	38–33
73	June 30	@ Phillies	1–8	Carlton	**Jones** (2–3)	—	36,162	38–34

July: 20–10 (Home: 15–1; Away: 5–9)

#	Date	Opponent	Score	Win	Loss	Save	Attendance	Record
74	July 1	@ Phillies	6–7 (14)	Garber	**Jackson** (0–3)	—	34,640	38–35
75	July 2	@ Phillies	3–4	Brusstar	**Reuss** (3–9)	Reed	41,828	38–36
76	July 3	@ Phillies	7–11	Christenson	**Kison** (6–4)	—	28,555	38–37
77	July 4	Cardinals	5–2	**Rooker** (6–5)	Underwood	**Gossage** (14)		39–37
78	July 4	Cardinals	4–3	**Tekulve** (6–1)	Eastwick	—	22,810	40–37
79	July 5	Cardinals	3–7	Forsch	**Candelaria** (8–3)	—	10,837	40–38
80	July 6	Cardinals	11–8	**Tekulve** (7–1)	Hrabosky	—	13,137	41–38
81	July 8	Phillies	8–7	**Gossage** (6–5)	Brusstar	—	25,200	42–38
82	July 9	Phillies	9–8 (12)	**Forster** (2–2)	Garber	—	19,144	43–38
83	July 10	Phillies	5–1	**Reuss** (4–9)	Lonborg	—		44–38
84	July 10	Phillies	12–10	**Jackson** (1–3)	Reed	**Gossage** (15)	39,042	45–38
85	July 11	@ Expos	2–4	Bahnsen	**Jones** (2–4)	—	19,763	45–39
86	July 12	@ Expos	5–4 (12)	**Gossage** (7–5)	Atkinson	—	14,781	46–39
87	July 13	@ Expos	6–1	**Candelaria** (9–3)	Rogers	—	22,799	47–39
88	July 15	@ Mets	7–1	**Rooker** (7–5)	Zachry	—		48–39
89	July 15	@ Mets	1–6	Espinosa	**Reuss** (4–10)	—	20,219	48–40
90	July 16	@ Mets	3–5	Swan	**Gossage** (7–6)	Apodaca	24,445	48–41
91	July 17	@ Mets	3–1	**Candelaria** (10–3)	Matlack	**Gossage** (16)		49–41
92	July 17	@ Mets	3–9	Koosman	**Forster** (2–3)	—	19,492	49–42
93	July 21	Reds	6–2	**Reuss** (5–10)	Norman	—	21,713	50–42
94	July 22	Reds	8–7 (12)	**Jackson** (2–3)	Billingham	—	38,888	51–42
95	July 23	Reds	5–4	**Rooker** (8–5)	Capilla	**Jackson** (2)	28,625	52–42
96	July 24	Braves	7–6 (13)	**Tekulve** (8–1)	Hargan	—	22,123	53–42
97	July 25	Braves	6–3	**Reuss** (6–10)	Niekro	—	8,752	54–42
98	July 26	Astros	3–2	**Candelaria** (11–3)	Richard	**Gossage** (17)	11,882	55–42
99	July 27	Astros	3–2 (11)	**Tekulve** (9–1)	McLaughlin	—	11,253	56–42
100	July 28	Astros	9–4	**Rooker** (9–5)	Larson	—	16,400	57–42
101	July 29	@ Braves	3–5	Niekro	**Kison** (6–5)	—	9,505	57–43
102	July 30	@ Braves	10–6	**Forster** (3–3)	Collins	—	19,006	58–43
103	July 31	@ Braves	3–8	Solomon	**Candelaria** (11–4)	Hanna	12,467	58–44

August: 18–12 (Home: 10–5; Away: 8–7)

#	Date	Opponent	Score	Win	Loss	Save	Attendance	Record
104	August 1	@ Astros	3–4 (11)	Lemongello	**Gossage** (7–7)	—	11,769	58–45
105	August 2	@ Astros	6–3 (10)	**Jackson** (3–3)	Larson	—	15,805	59–45
106	August 3	@ Astros	0–3	Niekro	**Kison** (6–6)	—	14,745	59–46
107	August 5	@ Reds	12–1	**Reuss** (7–10)	Norman	—		60–46
108	August 5	@ Reds	10–6	**Jackson** (4–3)	Capilla	—	50,085	61–46
109	August 6	@ Reds	3–8	Seaver	**Forster** (3–4)	—	44,267	61–47
110	August 7	@ Reds	0–6	Soto	**Rooker** (9–6)	—	40,028	61–48
111	August 8	Cubs	7–6	**Jackson** (5–3)	Reuschel	—	25,802	62–48
112	August 9	Cubs	1–4	Burris	**Reuss** (7–11)	Hernandez	28,341	62–49
113	August 10	Cubs	2–1 (18)	**Demery** (4–3)	Broberg	—	32,831	63–49
114	August 11	Mets	9–1	**Jones** (3–4)	Zachry	—	9,260	64–49
115	August 12	Mets	3–2	**Rooker** (10–6)	Koosman	—		65–49
116	August 12	Mets	6–5 (12)	**Demery** (5–3)	Siebert	—	18,994	66–49
117	August 13	Mets	2–0	**Reuss** (8–11)	Matlack	—	32,212	67–49
118	August 14	Mets	6–3	**Candelaria** (12–4)	Espinosa	**Tekulve** (4)	17,945	68–49
119	August 16	@ Cubs	5–6 (15)	Hernandez	**Demery** (5–4)	—	24,039	68–50
120	August 17	@ Cubs	2–4	Reuschel	**Rooker** (10–7)	—	29,786	68–51
121	August 18	@ Cubs	7–6	**Reuss** (9–11)	Burris	**Tekulve** (5)	24,027	69–51
122	August 19	Giants	6–1	**Candelaria** (13–4)	Knepper	—	16,831	70–51
123	August 20	Giants	1–5	Halicki	**Jones** (3–5)	—	15,947	70–52
124	August 21	Giants	4–5	Lavelle	**Gossage** (7–8)	Moffitt	32,232	70–53
125	August 22	Padres	0–1	Shirley	**Rooker** (10–8)	Fingers	7,375	70–54
126	August 23	Padres	7–6	**Gossage** (8–8)	Fingers	—	8,105	71–54
127	August 24	Dodgers	1–2 (10)	John	**Gossage** (8–9)	Garman	20,018	71–55
128	August 25	Dodgers	2–1	**Candelaria** (14–4)	Rau	**Demery** (1)	17,164	72–55
129	August 26	@ Padres	3–1	**Kison** (7–6)	Owchinko	**Gossage** (18)	18,696	73–55
130	August 27	@ Padres	4–0	**Reuss** (10–11)	Jones	—	14,732	74–55
131	August 28	@ Padres	10–1	**Rooker** (11–8)	Shirley	—	10,371	75–55
132	August 30	@ Giants	3–1	**Candelaria** (15–4)	Montefusco	—	12,699	76–55
133	August 31	@ Giants	3–6	Barr	**Kison** (7–7)	—	4,267	76–56

September: 17–10 (Home: 8–4; Away: 9–6)

#	Date	Opponent	Score	Win	Loss	Save	Attendance	Record
134	September 2	@ Dodgers	2–10	Hooton	**Reuss** (10–12)	—	39,276	76–57
135	September 3	@ Dodgers	4–6	Sutton	**Rooker** (11–9)	Garman	44,505	76–58
136	September 4	@ Dodgers	2–8	John	**Jones** (3–6)	—	36,686	76–59
137	September 5	Phillies	3–1	**Candelaria** (16–4)	Lerch	**Gossage** (19)		77–59
138	September 5	Phillies	1–11	Carlton	**Kison** (7–8)	—	40,423	77–60
139	September 6	Phillies	5–4 (11)	**Gossage** (9–9)	Garber	—	15,136	78–60
140	September 7	Cardinals	5–4	**Forster** (4–4)	Denny	**Tekulve** (6)	7,219	79–60
141	September 8	Cardinals	9–5	**Demery** (6–4)	Eastwick	**Gossage** (20)	4,848	80–60
142	September 9	Expos	1–2	Dues	**Jones** (3–7)	Stanhouse	7,628	80–61
143	September 10	Expos	2–4	Twitchell	**Candelaria** (16–5)	Kerrigan	7,697	80–62
144	September 11	Expos	10–4	**Kison** (8–8)	Holdsworth	—	9,470	81–62
145	September 12	@ Phillies	2–6	Christenson	**Reuss** (10–13)	—	42,145	81–63
146	September 13	@ Phillies	2–0	**Rooker** (12–9)	Kaat	**Gossage** (21)	42,638	82–63
147	September 15	@ Cardinals	4–3	**Candelaria** (17–5)	Rasmussen	**Gossage** (22)		83–63
148	September 15	@ Cardinals	7–10	Sutton	**Demery** (6–5)	Eastwick	9,081	83–64
149	September 16	@ Expos	0–5	Schatzeder	**Kison** (8–9)	Stanhouse	7,026	83–65
150	September 17	@ Expos	6–3	**Whitson** (1–0)	Landreth	**Gossage** (23)	12,674	84–65
151	September 18	@ Expos	7–5 (11)	**Tekulve** (10–1)	Rogers	—	25,097	85–65
152	September 20	@ Mets	4–2	**Candelaria** (18–5)	Espinosa	—	3,372	86–65
153	September 21	@ Mets	4–0	**Kison** (9–9)	Koosman	**Gossage** (24)	5,044	87–65
154	September 23	@ Cubs	2–0	**Rooker** (13–9)	Hernandez	**Gossage** (25)	3,757	88–65
155	September 24	@ Cubs	7–3	**Forster** (5–4)	Broberg	**Jackson** (3)	14,970	89–65
156	September 25	@ Cubs	4–0	**Candelaria** (19–5)	Reuschel	—	17,815	90–65
157	September 27	Mets	1–7	Espinosa	**Kison** (9–10)	—	3,379	90–66
158	September 28	Mets	3–2	**Rooker** (14–9)	Swan	**Gossage** (26)	2,673	91–66
159	September 29	Mets	5–2	**Forster** (6–4)	Medich	**Tekulve** (7)	2,504	92–66
160	September 30	Cubs	3–1	**Candelaria** (20–5)	Reuschel	—	8,507	93–66

October: 2–0 (Home: 2–0; Away: 0–0)

#	Date	Opponent	Score	Win	Loss	Save	Attendance	Record
161	October 2	Cubs	5–1	**Jones** (4–7)	Burris	**Jackson** (4)		94–66
162	October 2	Cubs	3–2	**Gossage** (10–9)	Lamp	—	20,418	95–66

Legend: = Win = Loss
Bold = Pirates team member

=== Notable transactions ===
- June 7, 1977: Wayne Tolleson was drafted by the Pirates in the 12th round of the 1977 Major League Baseball draft, but did not sign.
- June 15, 1977: Ed Kirkpatrick was traded by the Pirates to the Texas Rangers for Jim Fregosi.
- July 27, 1977: The Pirates traded a player to be named later to the Seattle Mariners for Dave Pagan. The Pirates completed the deal by sending Rick Honeycutt to the Mariners on August 22.
- August 18, 1977: Doug Frobel was signed by the Pittsburgh Pirates as an amateur free agent.

=== Roster ===
1977 Pittsburgh Pirates
**Roster**
**Pitchers**: 45 John Candelaria; 44 Larry Demery; 51 Terry Forster; 54 Goose Gossage; 31 Al Holland; 23,35 Grant Jackson; 36 Odell Jones; 48 Tim Jones; 25 Bruce Kison; 34 Dave Pagan; 41 Jerry Reuss; 19 Jim Rooker; 27 Kent Tekulve; 46 Ed Whitson	**Catchers**: 5 Duffy Dyer; 14 Ed Ott; **Infielders**: 4 Dale Berra; 26 Mike Edwards; 29 Jim Fregosi; 3,17 Phil Garner; 13 Fernando González; 23 Ed Kirkpatrick; 29,30 Ken Macha; 11 Mario Mendoza; 28 Bill Robinson; 8 Willie Stargell; 6 Rennie Stennett; 10 Frank Taveras; 24 Bobby Tolan	**Outfielders**: 37 Miguel Diloné; 24 Mike Easler; 22 Jerry Hairston; 18 Omar Moreno; 16 Al Oliver; 39 Dave Parker; **Other batters**: 24 Tommy Helms	**Manager**: 7 Chuck Tanner; **Coaches**: 32 Joe Lonnett; 42 Alex Monchak; 2 José Pagán; 43 Larry Sherry

== Player stats ==
= Indicates team leader

= Indicates league leader

=== Batting ===
==== Starters by position ====
Note: Pos = Position; G = Games played; AB = At bats; H = Hits; Avg. = Batting average; HR = Home runs; RBI = Runs batted in

Pos	Player	G	AB	H	Avg.	HR	RBI
C	Duffy Dyer	94	270	65	.241	3	19
1B	Bill Robinson	137	507	154	.304	26	104
2B	Rennie Stennett	116	453	152	.336	5	51
SS	Frank Taveras	147	544	137	.252	1	29
3B	Phil Garner	153	585	152	.260	17	77
LF	Al Oliver	154	568	175	.308	19	82
CF	Omar Moreno	150	492	118	.240	7	34
RF	Dave Parker	159	637	215	.338	21	88

==== Other batters ====
Note: G = Games played; AB = At bats; H = Hits; Avg. = Batting average; HR = Home runs; RBI = Runs batted in

Player	G	AB	H	Avg.	HR	RBI
Ed Ott	104	311	82	.264	7	38
Willie Stargell	63	186	51	.274	13	35
Fernando González	80	181	50	.276	4	27
Ken Macha	35	95	26	.274	0	11
Mario Mendoza	70	81	16	.198	0	4
Bobby Tolan	49	74	15	.203	2	9
Jim Fregosi	36	56	16	.286	3	16
Jerry Hairston	51	52	10	.192	2	6
Miguel Diloné	29	44	6	.136	0	0
Dale Berra	17	40	7	.175	0	3
Ed Kirkpatrick	21	28	4	.143	1	4
Mike Easler	10	18	8	.444	1	5
Tommy Helms	15	12	0	.000	0	0
Mike Edwards	7	6	0	.000	0	0

=== Pitching ===
==== Starting pitchers ====
Note: G = Games pitched; IP = Innings pitched; W = Wins; L = Losses; ERA = Earned run average; SO = Strikeouts

Player	G	IP	W	L	ERA	SO
John Candelaria	33	230.2	20	5	2.34	133
Jerry Reuss	33	208.0	10	13	4.11	116
Jim Rooker	30	204.1	14	9	3.08	89
Bruce Kison	33	193.0	9	10	4.90	122

==== Other pitchers ====
Note: G = Games pitched; IP = Innings pitched; W = Wins; L = Losses; ERA = Earned run average; SO = Strikeouts

Player	G	IP	W	L	ERA	SO
Odell Jones	34	108.0	3	7	5.08	66
Larry Demery	39	90.1	6	5	5.08	35
Terry Forster	33	87.1	6	4	4.43	58
Ed Whitson	5	15.2	1	0	3.45	10
Tim Jones	3	10.0	1	0	0.00	5

==== Relief pitchers ====
Note: G = Games pitched; W = Wins; L = Losses; SV = Saves; ERA = Earned run average; SO = Strikeouts

Player	G	W	L	SV	ERA	SO
Goose Gossage	72	11	9	26	1.62	151
Kent Tekulve	72	10	1	7	3.06	59
Grant Jackson	49	5	3	4	3.86	41
Al Holland	2	0	0	0	7.71	1
Dave Pagan	1	0	0	0	0.00	4
Mario Mendoza	1	0	0	0	13.50	0

== Awards and honors ==
1977 Major League Baseball All-Star Game

- Dave Parker, outfield, starter
- John Candelaria, reserve
- Goose Gossage, reserve

== Farm system ==
Level	Team	League	Manager
AAA	Columbus Clippers	International League	Tim Murtaugh and Johnny Lipon
AA	Shreveport Captains	Texas League	Johnny Lipon and Tim Murtaugh
A	Salem Pirates	Carolina League	Steve Demeter
A	Charleston Patriots	Western Carolinas League	Jim Mahoney
A-Short Season	Niagara Falls Pirates	New York–Penn League	Luther Quinn
Rookie	GCL Pirates	Gulf Coast League	Woody Huyke
