= 1977 St. Louis Cardinals season =

Major League Baseball season

1977 St. Louis Cardinals
- League: National League
- Division: East
- Ballpark: Busch Memorial Stadium
- City: St. Louis, Missouri
- Record: 83–79 (.512)
- Divisional place: 3rd
- Owners: August "Gussie" Busch
- General managers: Bing Devine
- Managers: Vern Rapp
- Television: KSD-TV (Jack Buck, Mike Shannon, Jay Randolph, Bob Starr)
- Radio: KMOX (Jack Buck, Mike Shannon, Bob Starr)

The 1977 St. Louis Cardinals season was the team's 96th season in St. Louis, Missouri and its 86th season in the National League. The Cardinals went 83–79 during the season and finished third in the National League East, 18 games behind the Philadelphia Phillies.

Vern Rapp took over as the Cardinals' manager this year, after the twelve-year reign of their longtime manager Red Schoendienst. On August 29, Cardinals left-fielder Lou Brock broke the modern-day stolen base record, by stealing bases 892 and 893 in a game against the Padres in San Diego.

== Offseason ==
- October 20, 1976: Willie Crawford, John Curtis and Vic Harris were traded by the Cardinals to the San Francisco Giants for Mike Caldwell, Dave Rader and John D'Acquisto.
- November 6, 1976: Bill Greif, Ángel Torres and Sam Mejías were traded by the Cardinals to the Montreal Expos for Pat Scanlon, Steve Dunning, and Tony Scott.
- November 6, 1976: Lee Richard was released by the Cardinals.
- November 21, 1977: Luis DeLeón was signed as an amateur free agent by the Cardinals.
- December 6, 1976: Roger Freed was selected by the Cardinals from the Montreal Expos in the rule 5 draft.
- January 11, 1977: Jesse Orosco was drafted by the Cardinals in the 7th round of the 1977 Major League Baseball draft, but did not sign. He would later pitch for the club in 2000.
- February 28, 1977: Mark Covert (minors) was traded by the Cardinals to the Chicago Cubs for Buddy Schultz.
- March 24, 1977: Tom Walker was released by the Cardinals.
- March 28, 1977: Bill Caudill was traded by the Cardinals to the Cincinnati Reds for Joel Youngblood.
- March 30, 1977: Doug Clarey was traded by the Cardinals to the New York Mets for Benny Ayala.
- March 31, 1977: Ken Rudolph was purchased from the Cardinals by the San Francisco Giants.

== Regular season ==
=== Opening Day starters ===
- Lou Brock
- Héctor Cruz
- Pete Falcone
- Keith Hernandez
- Don Kessinger
- Bake McBride
- Ken Reitz
- Ted Simmons
- Garry Templeton

=== Season standings ===
NL East
Team	W	L	Pct.	GB	Home	Road
Philadelphia Phillies	101	61	.623	—	60‍–‍21	41‍–‍40
Pittsburgh Pirates	96	66	.593	5	58‍–‍23	38‍–‍43
St. Louis Cardinals	83	79	.512	18	52‍–‍31	31‍–‍48
Chicago Cubs	81	81	.500	20	46‍–‍35	35‍–‍46
Montreal Expos	75	87	.463	26	38‍–‍43	37‍–‍44
New York Mets	64	98	.395	37	35‍–‍44	29‍–‍54

=== Record vs. opponents ===
1977 National League record Sources:
Team	ATL	CHC	CIN	HOU	LAD	MON	NYM	PHI	PIT	SD	SF	STL
Atlanta	—	5–7	4–14	9–9	5–13	6–6	7–5	2–10	3–9	11–7	8–10	1–11
Chicago	7–5	—	7–5	6–6	6–6	10–8	9–9	6–12	7–11	7–5	9–3	7–11
Cincinnati	14–4	5–7	—	5–13	10–8	7–5	10–2	8–4	3–9	11–7	10–8	5–7
Houston	9–9	6–6	13–5	—	9–9	8–4	6–6	4–8	4–8	8–10	9–9	5–7
Los Angeles	13–5	6–6	8–10	9–9	—	7–5	8–4	6–6	9–3	12–6	14–4	6–6
Montreal	6–6	8–10	5–7	4–8	5–7	—	10–8	7–11	7–11	5–7	6–6	12–6
New York	5–7	9–9	2–10	6–6	4–8	8–10	—	5–13	4–14	6–6	7–5	8–10
Philadelphia	10-2	12–6	4–8	8–4	6–6	11–7	13–5	—	8–10	9–3	9–3	11–7
Pittsburgh	9–3	11–7	9–3	8–4	3–9	11–7	14–4	10–8	—	10–2	2–10	9–9
San Diego	7–11	5–7	7–11	10–8	6–12	7–5	6–6	3–9	2–10	—	8–10	8–4
San Francisco	10–8	3–9	8–10	9–9	4–14	6–6	5–7	3–9	10–2	10–8	—	7–5
St. Louis	11–1	11–7	7–5	7–5	6–6	6–12	10–8	7–11	9–9	4–8	5–7	—

=== Notable transactions ===
- May 17, 1977: John D'Acquisto and Pat Scanlon were traded by the Cardinals to the San Diego Padres for Butch Metzger.
- June 7, 1977: Mike Jeffcoat was drafted by the St. Louis Cardinals in the 30th round of the 1977 amateur draft, but did not sign.
- June 7, 1977: Neil Fiala was drafted by the Cardinals in the 32nd round of the 1977 Major League Baseball draft.
- June 15, 1977: Bake McBride and Steve Waterbury were traded by the Cardinals to the Philadelphia Phillies for Tom Underwood, Dane Iorg, and Rick Bosetti.
- June 15, 1977: Joel Youngblood was traded by the Cardinals to the New York Mets for Mike Phillips.
- August 20, 1977: Don Kessinger was traded by the Cardinals to the Chicago White Sox for Steve Staniland (minors).
- August 31, 1977: Clay Carroll was traded by the Cardinals to the Chicago White Sox for players to be named later. The White Sox completed the deal by sending Nyls Nyman to the Cardinals on September 2, and sending Dave Hamilton and Silvio Martínez to the Cardinals on November 28.

=== Roster ===
1977 St. Louis Cardinals
Roster
Pitchers: 26 Doug Capilla; 33 Clay Carroll; 34 John D'Acquisto; 36 John Denny; 49 Larry Dierker; 26 Rawly Eastwick; 41 Pete Falcone; 31 Bob Forsch; 39 Al Hrabosky; 34 Butch Metzger; 42 Eric Rasmussen; 22 Buddy Schultz; 35 John Sutton; 40 Tom Underwood; 38 John Urrea	Catchers: 14 Dave Rader; 23 Ted Simmons; 12 John Tamargo; Infielders: 16 Jerry DaVanon; 16 Taylor Duncan; 7 Roger Freed; 37 Keith Hernandez; 11 Don Kessinger; 24 Ken Oberkfell; 5 Mike Phillips; 44 Ken Reitz; 1 Garry Templeton; 10 Mike Tyson	Outfielders: 27 Mike Anderson; 15 Benny Ayala; 21 Rick Bosetti; 20 Lou Brock; 25 Héctor Cruz; 11 Jim Dwyer; 19 Dane Iorg; 21 Bake McBride; 29 Jerry Mumphrey; 43 Mike Potter; 30 Tony Scott; 19 Joel Youngblood	Manager: 9 Vern Rapp; Coaches: 8 Jack Krol; 4 Mo Mozzali; 18 Claude Osteen; 3 Sonny Ruberto

== Game log ==
=== Regular season ===
Legend
Cardinals Win	Cardinals Loss	Game postponed	Eliminated from playoff race
Boldface text denotes a Cardinals pitcher

1977 regular season game log: 83–79 (Home: 52–31; Away: 31–48)
April: 12–7 (Home: 5–3; Away: 7–4)

#	Date	Time (CT)	Opponent	Score	Win	Loss	Save	Time of Game	Attendance	Record	Box Streak

May: 16–11 (Home: 12–8; Away: 4–3)

#	Date	Time (CT)	Opponent	Score	Win	Loss	Save	Time of Game	Attendance	Record	Box Streak

June: 13–15 (Home: 11–5; Away: 2–10)

#	Date	Time (CT)	Opponent	Score	Win	Loss	Save	Time of Game	Attendance	Record	Box Streak

July: 15–15 (Home: 9–2; Away: 6–13)

#	Date	Time (CT)	Opponent	Score	Win	Loss	Save	Time of Game	Attendance	Record	Box Streak

August: 15–14 (Home: 8–5; Away: 7–9)

#	Date	Time (CT)	Opponent	Score	Win	Loss	Save	Time of Game	Attendance	Record	Box Streak

September: 11–15 (Home: 6–6; Away: 5–9)

#	Date	Time (CT)	Opponent	Score	Win	Loss	Save	Time of Game	Attendance	Record	Box Streak

October: 1–2 (Home: 1–2; Away: 0–0)

#	Date	Time (CT)	Opponent	Score	Win	Loss	Save	Time of Game	Attendance	Record	Box Streak

== Player stats ==
=== Batting ===
==== Starters by position ====
Note: Pos = Position; G = Games played; AB = At bats; H = Hits; Avg. = Batting average; HR = Home runs; RBI = Runs batted in

Pos	Player	G	AB	H	Avg.	HR	RBI
C	Ted Simmons	150	516	164	.318	21	95
1B	Keith Hernandez	161	560	163	.291	15	91
2B	Mike Tyson	138	418	103	.246	7	57
3B	Ken Reitz	157	587	153	.261	17	79
SS	Garry Templeton	153	621	200	.322	8	79
LF	Lou Brock	141	489	133	.272	2	46
CF	Tony Scott	95	292	85	.291	3	41
RF	Héctor Cruz	118	339	80	.236	6	42

==== Other batters ====
Note: G = Games played; AB = At bats; H = Hits; Avg. = Batting average; HR = Home runs; RBI = Runs batted in

Player	G	AB	H	Avg.	HR	RBI
Jerry Mumphrey	145	463	133	.287	2	38
Mike Anderson	94	154	34	.221	4	17
Don Kessinger	59	134	32	.239	0	7
Bake McBride	43	122	32	.262	4	20
Dave Rader	66	114	30	.263	1	16
Mike Phillips	48	87	21	.241	0	9
Roger Freed	49	83	33	.398	5	21
Rick Bosetti	41	69	16	.232	0	3
Dane Iorg	30	32	10	.313	0	4
Jim Dwyer	13	31	7	.226	0	2
Joel Youngblood	25	27	5	.185	0	1
Taylor Duncan	8	12	4	.333	1	2
Ken Oberkfell	9	9	1	.111	0	1
Jerry DaVanon	9	8	0	.000	0	0
Mike Potter	5	7	0	.000	0	0
John Tamargo	4	4	0	.000	0	0
Benny Ayala	1	3	1	.333	0	0

=== Pitching ===
==== Starting pitchers ====
Note: G = Games pitched; IP = Innings pitched; W = Wins; L = Losses; ERA = Earned run average; SO = Strikeouts

Player	G	IP	W	L	ERA	SO
Eric Rasmussen	34	233.0	11	17	3.48	120
Bob Forsch	35	217.1	20	7	3.48	95
John Denny	26	149.2	8	8	4.51	60
Pete Falcone	27	124.0	4	8	5.44	75
Tom Underwood	19	100.0	6	9	4.95	66
Larry Dierker	11	39.1	2	6	4.58	6

==== Other pitchers ====
Note: G = Games pitched; IP = Innings pitched; W = Wins; L = Losses; ERA = Earned run average; SO = Strikeouts

Player	G	IP	W	L	ERA	SO
John Urrea	41	139.2	7	6	3.16	81
John D'Acquisto	3	8.1	0	0	4.32	9

==== Relief pitchers ====
Note: G = Games pitched; W = Wins; L = Losses; SV = Saves; ERA = Earned run average; SO = Strikeouts

Player	G	W	L	SV	ERA	SO
Al Hrabosky	65	6	5	10	4.38	68
Butch Metzger	58	4	2	7	3.11	48
Clay Carroll	51	4	2	4	2.50	34
Rawly Eastwick	41	3	7	4	4.70	30
Buddy Schultz	40	6	1	1	2.32	66
John Sutton	14	2	1	0	2.59	9
Doug Capilla	2	0	0	0	15.43	1

== Awards and honors ==
- Lou Brock, Lou Gehrig Award
- Garry Templeton, National League leader, triples (19)

== Farm system ==
Level	Team	League	Manager
AAA	New Orleans Pelicans	American Association	Lance Nichols
AA	Arkansas Travelers	Texas League	Buzzy Keller and Tommy Thompson
A	St. Petersburg Cardinals	Florida State League	Hub Kittle
A	Gastonia Cardinals	Western Carolinas League	Hal Lanier
Rookie	Johnson City Cardinals	Appalachian League	Dave Ricketts
Rookie	Calgary Cardinals	Pioneer League	Johnny Lewis

LEAGUE CHAMPIONS: Arkansas, Gastonia
