= Fred Andrews (baseball) =

American baseball player (1952–2021)

- Second baseman
- Born: May 4, 1952; Lafayette, Louisiana, U.S.
- Died: December 20, 2021 (aged 69); Chicago, Illinois, U.S.
- Batted: Right Threw: Right

MLB debut
- September 26, 1976, for the Philadelphia Phillies

Last MLB appearance
- October 2, 1977, for the Philadelphia Phillies

MLB statistics
- Batting average: .276
- Home runs: 0
- Runs batted in: 2
- Stats at Baseball Reference

Teams
- Philadelphia Phillies (1976–1977)

Fred Andrews (May 4, 1952 – December 20, 2021) was an American Major League Baseball second baseman who played for the Philadelphia Phillies in 1976 and 1977.

== Biography ==
A native of Lafayette, Louisiana, Andrews attended high school in Lincoln Heights, Ohio and was selected by the Philadelphia Phillies in the 8th round of the 1970 MLB draft.

Andrews made his major league debut with Philadelphia in 1976, playing in four games for the club that season and 12 games in 1977. In two major league seasons, Andrews batted .276 (8-for-29) with 4 runs and 2 RBI in 16 games. Defensively, he handled 44 total chances (23 putouts, 21 assists) at second base without an error for a 1.000 fielding percentage.

Andrews was traded along with cash from the Phillies to the New York Mets for Bud Harrelson on March 23, 1978. He played the 1978 season with the Tidewater Tides of the AAA International League.
