= 1977 Los Angeles Dodgers season =

Major League Baseball season

1977 Los Angeles Dodgers
- National League champions National League West champions
- League: National League
- Division: West
- Ballpark: Dodger Stadium
- City: Los Angeles
- Record: 98–64 (.605)
- Divisional place: 1st
- Owners: Walter O'Malley
- President: Peter O'Malley
- General managers: Al Campanis
- Managers: Tommy Lasorda
- Television: KTTV (11)
- Radio: KABC; Vin Scully, Jerry Doggett, Ross Porter; XEGM; Jaime Jarrín, Rudy Hoyos

The 1977 Los Angeles Dodgers season was the 88th season for the Los Angeles Dodgers franchise in Major League Baseball (MLB), their 20th season in Los Angeles, California, and their 16th season playing their home games at Dodger Stadium in Los Angeles California.

Tommy Lasorda started his first full season at the helm of the Dodgers, replacing longtime manager Walter Alston as manager of the team near the end of the previous season. The Dodgers won the National League West by 10 games and defeated the Philadelphia Phillies in four games in the NLCS, then lost to the New York Yankees in the World Series. This edition of the Dodgers featured the first quartet of teammates that hit 30 or more home runs: Steve Garvey with 33, Reggie Smith with 32, and Dusty Baker and Ron Cey, who both hit 30. The Dodgers duplicated this feat again 20 years later in 1997.

== Offseason ==
- December 20, 1976: Ted Sizemore was traded by the Dodgers to the Philadelphia Phillies for Johnny Oates and a player to be named later. The Phillies completed the deal by sending Quincy Hill (minors) to the Dodgers on January 4, 1977.
- January 11, 1977: Bill Buckner, Iván DeJesús and Jeff Albert (minors) were traded by the Dodgers to the Chicago Cubs for Rick Monday and Mike Garman.
- February 7, 1977: Rick Auerbach was traded by the Dodgers to the New York Mets for Hank Webb and Richard Sander (minors).

== Regular season ==
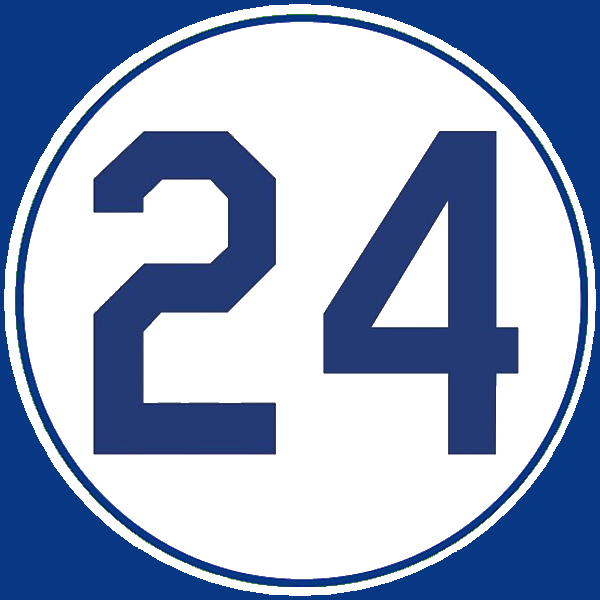
Walter Alston's number 24 was retired by the Los Angeles Dodgers in 1977.

=== Season standings ===
NL West
Team	W	L	Pct.	GB	Home	Road
Los Angeles Dodgers	98	64	.605	—	51‍–‍30	47‍–‍34
Cincinnati Reds	88	74	.543	10	48‍–‍33	40‍–‍41
Houston Astros	81	81	.500	17	46‍–‍35	35‍–‍46
San Francisco Giants	75	87	.463	23	38‍–‍43	37‍–‍44
San Diego Padres	69	93	.426	29	35‍–‍46	34‍–‍47
Atlanta Braves	61	101	.377	37	40‍–‍41	21‍–‍60

=== Record vs. opponents ===
1977 National League record Sources:
Team	ATL	CHC	CIN	HOU	LAD	MON	NYM	PHI	PIT	SD	SF	STL
Atlanta	—	5–7	4–14	9–9	5–13	6–6	7–5	2–10	3–9	11–7	8–10	1–11
Chicago	7–5	—	7–5	6–6	6–6	10–8	9–9	6–12	7–11	7–5	9–3	7–11
Cincinnati	14–4	5–7	—	5–13	10–8	7–5	10–2	8–4	3–9	11–7	10–8	5–7
Houston	9–9	6–6	13–5	—	9–9	8–4	6–6	4–8	4–8	8–10	9–9	5–7
Los Angeles	13–5	6–6	8–10	9–9	—	7–5	8–4	6–6	9–3	12–6	14–4	6–6
Montreal	6–6	8–10	5–7	4–8	5–7	—	10–8	7–11	7–11	5–7	6–6	12–6
New York	5–7	9–9	2–10	6–6	4–8	8–10	—	5–13	4–14	6–6	7–5	8–10
Philadelphia	10-2	12–6	4–8	8–4	6–6	11–7	13–5	—	8–10	9–3	9–3	11–7
Pittsburgh	9–3	11–7	9–3	8–4	3–9	11–7	14–4	10–8	—	10–2	2–10	9–9
San Diego	7–11	5–7	7–11	10–8	6–12	7–5	6–6	3–9	2–10	—	8–10	8–4
San Francisco	10–8	3–9	8–10	9–9	4–14	6–6	5–7	3–9	10–2	10–8	—	7–5
St. Louis	11–1	11–7	7–5	7–5	6–6	6–12	10–8	7–11	9–9	4–8	5–7	—

=== Opening Day lineup ===
Opening Day starters
#	Name	Position
15	Davey Lopes	2B
18	Bill Russell	SS
8	Reggie Smith	RF
10	Ron Cey	3B
6	Steve Garvey	1B
16	Rick Monday	CF
12	Dusty Baker	LF
7	Steve Yeager	C
20	Don Sutton	P

=== Notable transactions ===
- September 2, 1977: John Hale was claimed off waivers from the Dodgers by the Toronto Blue Jays.
- September 2, 1977: Henry Cruz was claimed off waivers from the Dodgers by the Chicago White Sox.
- September 8, 1977: Kevin Pasley was sold by the Dodgers to the Seattle Mariners.

=== Roster ===
1977 Los Angeles Dodgers
Roster
Pitchers: 41 Bobby Castillo; 44 Al Downing; 29 Mike Garman; 46 Burt Hooton; 49 Charlie Hough; 25 Tommy John; 35 Dennis Lewallyn; 31 Doug Rau; 38 Lance Rautzhan; 36 Rick Rhoden; 27 Elías Sosa; 20 Don Sutton; 45 Stan Wall; 37 Hank Webb	Catchers: 9 Jerry Grote; 5 Johnny Oates; 4 Kevin Pasley; 7 Steve Yeager; Infielders: 10 Ron Cey; 6 Steve Garvey; 21 Ed Goodson; 56 Rafael Landestoy; 15 Davey Lopes; 23 Ted Martínez; 22 Boog Powell; 18 Bill Russell; 44 Ron Washington	Outfielders: 12 Dusty Baker; 3 Glenn Burke; 33 Vic Davalillo; 43 John Hale; 34 Lee Lacy; 51 Jeffrey Leonard; 16 Rick Monday; 11 Manny Mota; 17 Joe Simpson; 8 Reggie Smith	Manager: 2 Tommy Lasorda; Coaches: 26 Red Adams; 54 Monty Basgall; 58 Mark Cresse; 19 Jim Gilliam; 28 Preston Gómez

== Game log ==
=== Regular season ===
Legend
	Dodgers win
	Dodgers loss
	Postponement
	Clinched division
**Bold**	Dodgers team member

1977 regular season game log: 98–64 (Home: 51–30; Away: 47–34)
April: 17–3 (Home: 6–2; Away: 11–1)

#	Date	Time (PT)	Opponent	Score	Win	Loss	Save	Time of Game	Attendance	Record	Box/ Streak

May: 16–12 (Home: 8–5; Away: 8–7)

#	Date	Time (PT)	Opponent	Score	Win	Loss	Save	Time of Game	Attendance	Record	Box/ Streak
26	May 6	7:35 p.m. PDT	Phillies	9–3	**Sutton** (4–0)	Cchristenson (2–3)	—	2:03	51,368	22–4	W5
27	May 7	7:05 p.m. PDT	Phillies	4–7 (13)	Underwood (1–0)	**Downing** (0–1)	—	3:27	38,910	22–5	L1
—	May 8	1:05 p.m. PDT	Phillies	Postponed (rain); Makeup: July 26							
34	May 16	4:35 p.m. PDT	@ Phillies	6–10	Lerch (5–2)	**John** (3–2)	Reed (4)	2:25	28,036	26–8	L1
35	May 17	4:35 p.m. PDT	@ Phillies	6–4	**Sutton** (6–0)	Christenson (3–4)	**Hough** (10)	2:28	30,292	27–8	W1
36	May 18	4:35 p.m. PDT	@ Phillies	6–4	**Rhoden** (6–1)	Twitchell (0–4)	**Hough** (11)	2:35	30,132	28–8	W2

June: 17–11 (Home: 9–3; Away: 8–8)

#	Date	Time (PT)	Opponent	Score	Win	Loss	Save	Time of Game	Attendance	Record	Box/ Streak

July: 16–12 (Home: 6–9; Away: 10–3)

#	Date	Time (PT)	Opponent	Score	Win	Loss	Save	Time of Game	Attendance	Record	Box/ Streak
—	July 19	5:15 p.m. PDT	48th All-Star Game	National League vs. American League (Yankee Stadium, Bronx, New York)							
98 (1)	July 26	4:35 p.m. PDT	Phillies	5–1	**Rhoden** (11–7)	Carlton (13–6)	**Garman** (4)	2:06	—	61–37	W1
99 (2)	July 26	7:06 p.m. PDT	Phillies	1–5	Lonborg (5–3)	**Hooton** (8–5)	—	2:02	47,966	61–38	L1
100	July 27	7:35 p.m. PDT	Phillies	7–5	**Rautzhan** (1–0)	McGraw (4–2)	**Garman** (5)	2:13	38,571	62–38	W1
101	July 28	1:05 p.m. PDT	Phillies	2–1	**John** (11–4)	Kaat (4–6)	—	1:50	33,260	63–38	W2

August: 14–15 (Home: 11–5; Away: 3–10)

#	Date	Time (PT)	Opponent	Score	Win	Loss	Save	Time of Game	Attendance	Record	Box/ Streak
108	August 5	5:05 p.m. PDT	@ Phillies	3–8	Garber (5–5)	**Rautzhan** (1–1)	—	2:40	47,574	67–41	L2
109	August 6	4:35 p.m. PDT	@ Phillies	0–1	Garber (6–5)	**Hooton** (9–6)	—	1:58	50,111	67–42	L3
110	August 7	10:35 a.m. PDT	@ Phillies	1–3	Carlton (16–6)	**Sutton** (10–6)	—	2:08	40,628	67–43	L4

September: 17–10 (Home: 10–5; Away: 5–5)

#	Date	Time (PT)	Opponent	Score	Win	Loss	Save	Time of Game	Attendance	Record	Box/ Streak

October: 1–1 (Home: 1–1; Away: 0–0)

#	Date	Time (PT)	Opponent	Score	Win	Loss	Save	Time of Game	Attendance	Record	Box/ Streak

=== Detailed records ===
**National League**
Opponent	Home	Away	Total	Pct.	Runs scored	Runs allowed
**NL East**
Chicago Cubs	4–2	2–4	6–6	.500	38	41
Montreal Expos	2–4	5–1	7–5	.583	52	36
New York Mets	5–1	3–3	8–4	.667	48	33
Philadelphia Phillies	4–2	2–4	6–6	.500	50	52
Pittsburgh Pirates	6–0	3–3	9–3	.750	62	37
St. Louis Cardinals	5–1	1–5	6–6	.500	72	52
	**26–10**	**16–20**	**42–30**	**.583**	**322**	**251**
**NL West**
Atlanta Braves	6–3	7–2	13–5	.722	115	76
Cincinnati Reds	3–6	5–4	8–10	.444	75	73
Houston Astros	5–4	4–5	9–9	.500	70	63
**Los Angeles Dodgers**	—	—	—	—	—	—
San Diego Padres	5–4	7–2	12–6	.667	89	60
San Francisco Giants	6–3	8–1	14–4	.778	98	59
	**25–20**	**31–14**	**56–34**	**.622**	**447**	**331**

==== Month-by-Month ====
Month	Games	Won	Lost	Win %	RS	RA
April	20	17	3	0.850	132	77
May	28	16	12	0.571	127	116
June	28	17	11	0.607	141	105
July	28	16	12	0.571	122	88
August	29	14	15	0.483	108	85
September	27	17	10	0.630	132	102
October	2	1	1	0.500	7	9
Total	162	98	64	0.605	769	582

	Games	Won	Lost	Win %	RS	RA
Home	81	51	30	0.630	386	273
Road	81	47	33	0.588	383	309
Total	162	98	64	0.605	769	582

=== Composite Box ===
1977 Los Angeles Dodgers Inning–by–Inning Boxscore
Team	1	2	3	4	5	6	7	8	9	10	11	12	13	14	R	H	E
Opponents	67	69	55	70	49	49	65	70	70	7	2	3	3	2	582	1393	0
Dodgers	117	79	80	102	100	76	77	79	40	14	3	1	1	1	769	1484	124

=== Postseason Game log ===
1977 Postseason game log: 5–5 (Home: 2–3; Away: 3–2)
NL Championship Series: vs. Philadelphia Phillies 3–1 (Home: 1–1; Away: 2–0)

#	Date	Time (PT)	Opponent	Score	Win	Loss	Save	Time of Game	Attendance	Series	Box Streak
1	October 4	5:15 p.m. PDT	Phillies	5–7	Garber (1–0)	**Sosa** (0–1)	McGraw (1)	2:35	55,968	PHI 1–0	L1
2	October 5	5:15 p.m. PDT	Phillies	7–1	**Sutton** (1–0)	Lonborg (0–1)	—	2:14	55,973	TIE 1–1	W1
3	October 7	12:15 p.m. PDT	@ Phillies	6–5	**Rautzhan** (1–0)	Garber (1–1)	**Garman** (1)	2:59	63,719	LAN 2–1	W2
4	October 8	5:15 p.m. PDT	@ Phillies	4–1	**John** (1–0)	Carlton (0–1)	—	2:39	64,924	LAN 3–1	W3

World Series: vs. New York Yankees 2–4 (Home: 1–2; Away: 1–2)

#	Date	Time (PT)	Opponent	Score	Win	Loss	Save	Time of Game	Attendance	Series	Box Streak
1	October 11	5:15 p.m. PDT	@ Yankees	3–4 (12)	Lyle (1–0)	**Rhoden** (0–1)	—	3:24	56,668	NYA 1–0	L1
2	October 12	5:15 p.m. PDT	@ Yankees	6–1	**Hooton** (1–0)	Hunter (0–1)	—	2:27	56,691	TIE 1–1	W1
3	October 14	5:15 p.m. PDT	Yankees	3–5	Torrez (1–0)	**John** (0–1)	—	2:31	55,992	NYA 2–1	L1
4	October 15	1:15 p.m. PDT	Yankees	2–4	Guidry (1–0)	**Rau** (0–1)	—	2:07	55,995	NYA 3–1	L2
5	October 16	1:15 p.m. PDT	Yankees	10–4	**Sutton** (1–0)	Gullett (0–1)	—	2:29	55,955	NYA 3–2	W1
6	October 18	5:15 p.m. PDT	@ Yankees	4–8	Torrez (2–0)	**Hooton** (1–1)	—	2:18	56,407	NYA 4–2	L1

== Starting Lineups ==
=== Regular Season ===
==== Batting Order ====
1977 Regular Season Batting Order game log
April

#	Date	Opponent	1st	2nd	3rd	4th	5th	6th	7th	8th	9th

May

#	Date	Opponent	1st	2nd	3rd	4th	5th	6th	7th	8th	9th
26	May 6	PHI									
27	May 7	PHI									
34	May 16	@ PHI									
35	May 17	@ PHI									
36	May 18	@ PHI									

June

#	Date	Opponent	1st	2nd	3rd	4th	5th	6th	7th	8th	9th

July

#	Date	Opponent	1st	2nd	3rd	4th	5th	6th	7th	8th	9th
98	July 26	PHI									
99	July 26	PHI									
100	July 27	PHI									
101	July 28	PHI									

August

#	Date	Opponent	1st	2nd	3rd	4th	5th	6th	7th	8th	9th
108	August 5	@ PHI									
109	August 6	@ PHI									
110	August 7	@ PHI									

September

#	Date	Opponent	1st	2nd	3rd	4th	5th	6th	7th	8th	9th

October

#	Date	Opponent	1st	2nd	3rd	4th	5th	6th	7th	8th	9th

==== Defensive Lineup ====
1977 Regular Season Defensive Lineup game log
April

#	Date	Opponent	C	1B	2B	3B	SS	LF	CF	RF	P

May

#	Date	Opponent	C	1B	2B	3B	SS	LF	CF	RF	P
26	May 6	PHI									
27	May 7	PHI									
34	May 16	@ PHI									
35	May 17	@ PHI									
36	May 18	@ PHI									

June

#	Date	Opponent	C	1B	2B	3B	SS	LF	CF	RF	P

July

#	Date	Opponent	C	1B	2B	3B	SS	LF	CF	RF	P
98	July 26	PHI									
99	July 26	PHI									
100	July 27	PHI									
101	July 28	PHI									

August

#	Date	Opponent	C	1B	2B	3B	SS	LF	CF	RF	P
108	August 5	@ PHI									
109	August 6	@ PHI									
110	August 7	@ PHI									

September

#	Date	Opponent	C	1B	2B	3B	SS	LF	CF	RF	P

October

#	Date	Opponent	C	1B	2B	3B	SS	LF	CF	RF	P

=== Postseason ===
==== Batting Order ====
1977 Postseason Batting Order game log
NL Championship Series: vs. Philadelphia Phillies

#	Date	Opponent	1st	2nd	3rd	4th	5th	6th	7th	8th	9th
1	October 4	PHI									
2	October 5	PHI									
3	October 7	@ PHI									
4	October 8	@ PHI									

World Series: vs. New York Yankees

#	Date	Opponent	1st	2nd	3rd	4th	5th	6th	7th	8th	9th
1	October 11	@ NYY	#15; Lopes (2B)	#18; Russell (SS)	#8; Smith (RF)	#10; Cey (3B)	#6; Garvey (1B)	#12; Baker (LF)	#3; Burke (CF)	#7; Yeager (C)	#20; Sutton (SP)
2	October 12	@ NYY	#15; Lopes (2B)	#18; Russell (SS)	#8; Smith (RF)	#10; Cey (3B)	#6; Garvey (1B)	#12; Baker (LF)	#16; Monday (CF)	#7; Yeager (C)	#46; Hooton (SP)
3	October 14	NYY	#15; Lopes (2B)	#18; Russell (SS)	#8; Smith (RF)	#10; Cey (3B)	#6; Garvey (1B)	#12; Baker (LF)	#16; Monday (CF)	#7; Yeager (C)	#25; John (SP)
4	October 15	NYY	#15; Lopes (2B)	#18; Russell (SS)	#8; Smith (CF)	#10; Cey (3B)	#6; Garvey (1B)	#12; Baker (LF)	#34; Lacy (RF)	#7; Yeager (C)	#31; Rau (SP)
5	October 16	NYY	#15; Lopes (2B)	#18; Russell (SS)	#8; Smith (CF)	#10; Cey (3B)	#6; Garvey (1B)	#12; Baker (LF)	#34; Lacy (RF)	#7; Yeager (C)	#20; Sutton (SP)
6	October 18	@ NYY	#15; Lopes (2B)	#18; Russell (SS)	#8; Smith (RF)	#10; Cey (3B)	#6; Garvey (1B)	#12; Baker (LF)	#16; Monday (CF)	#7; Yeager (C)	#46; Hooton (SP)

==== Defensive Lineup ====
1977 Postseason Defensive Lineup game log
NL Championship Series: vs. Philadelphia Phillies

#	Date	Opponent	C	1B	2B	3B	SS	LF	CF	RF	P
1	October 4	PHI									
2	October 5	PHI									
3	October 7	@ PHI									
4	October 8	@ PHI									

World Series: vs. New York Yankees

#	Date	Opponent	C	1B	2B	3B	SS	LF	CF	RF	P
1	October 11	@ NYY	#7; Yeager	#6; Garvey	#15; Lopes	#10; Cey	#18; Russell	#12; Baker	#3; Burke	#8; Smith	#20; Sutton
2	October 12	@ NYY	#7; Yeager	#6; Garvey	#15; Lopes	#10; Cey	#18; Russell	#12; Baker	#16; Monday	#8; Smith	#46; Hooton
3	October 14	NYY	#7; Yeager	#6; Garvey	#15; Lopes	#10; Cey	#18; Russell	#12; Baker	#16; Monday	#8; Smith	#25; John
4	October 15	NYY	#7; Yeager	#6; Garvey	#15; Lopes	#10; Cey	#18; Russell	#12; Baker	#8; Smith	#34; Lacy	#31; Rau
5	October 16	NYY	#7; Yeager	#6; Garvey	#15; Lopes	#10; Cey	#18; Russell	#12; Baker	#8; Smith	#34; Lacy	#20; Sutton
6	October 18	@ NYY	#7; Yeager	#6; Garvey	#15; Lopes	#10; Cey	#18; Russell	#12; Baker	#16; Monday	#8; Smith	#46; Hooton

== Game Umpires ==
=== Regular Season ===
1977 Regular Season Umpire game log
April

#	Date	Opponent	HP	1B	2B	3B

May

#	Date	Opponent	HP	1B	2B	3B
26	May 6	PHI	#5; Bruce Froemming	#17; Terry Tata	#16; Ed Sudol (crew chief)	#15; Dick Stello
27	May 7	PHI	#17; Terry Tata	#16; Ed Sudol (crew chief)	#15; Dick Stello	#5; Bruce Froemming
34	May 16	@ PHI	#18; Ed Vargo (crew chief)	#23; Jim Quick	#3; Satch Davidson	#19; Harry Wendelstedt
35	May 17	@ PHI	#23; Jim Quick	#3; Satch Davidson	#19; Harry Wendelstedt	#18; Ed Vargo (crew chief)
36	May 18	@ PHI	#3; Satch Davidson	#19; Harry Wendelstedt	#18; Ed Vargo (crew chief)	#23; Jim Quick

June

#	Date	Opponent	HP	1B	2B	3B

July

#	Date	Opponent	HP	1B	2B	3B
98	July 26	PHI	#24; Ed Montague	#8; John Kibler (crew chief)	#1; Nick Colosi	#12; Frank Pulli
99	July 26	PHI	#8; John Kibler (crew chief)	#1; Nick Colosi	#12; Frank Pulli	#24; Ed Montague
100	July 27	PHI	#1; Nick Colosi	#12; Frank Pulli	#24; Ed Montague	#8; John Kibler (crew chief)
101	July 28	PHI	#12; Frank Pulli	#24; Ed Montague	#8; John Kibler (crew chief)	#1; Nick Colosi

August

#	Date	Opponent	HP	1B	2B	3B
108	August 5	@ PHI	#17; Terry Tata	#18; Ed Vargo (crew chief)	#19; Harry Wendelstedt	#3; Satch Davidson
109	August 6	@ PHI	#18; Ed Vargo (crew chief)	#19; Harry Wendelstedt	#3; Satch Davidson	#17; Terry Tata
110	August 7	@ PHI	#19; Harry Wendelstedt	#3; Satch Davidson	#17; Terry Tata	#18; Ed Vargo (crew chief)

September

#	Date	Opponent	HP	1B	2B	3B

October

#	Date	Opponent	HP	1B	2B	3B

=== Postseason ===
1977 Postseason Umpire game log
NL Championship Series: vs. Philadelphia Phillies

#	Date	Opponent	HP	1B	2B	3B	LF	RF
1	October 4	PHI	#11; Paul Pryor	#4; Bob Engel	#19; Harry Wendelstedt	#5; Bruce Froemming	#13; Dutch Rennert (crew chief)	#14; Paul Runge
2	October 5	PHI	#4; Bob Engel	#19; Harry Wendelstedt	#5; Bruce Froemming	#13; Dutch Rennert (crew chief)	#14; Paul Runge	#11; Paul Pryor
3	October 7	@ PHI	#19; Harry Wendelstedt	#5; Bruce Froemming	#13; Dutch Rennert (crew chief)	#14; Paul Runge	#11; Paul Pryor	#4; Bob Engel
4	October 8	@ PHI	#5; Bruce Froemming	#13; Dutch Rennert (crew chief)	#14; Paul Runge	#11; Paul Pryor	#4; Bob Engel	#19; Harry Wendelstedt

World Series: vs. New York Yankees

#	Date	Opponent	HP	1B	2B	3B	LF	RF
1	October 11	@ NYY	Nestor Chylak (AL) (crew chief)	#16; Ed Sudol (NL)	Larry McCoy (AL)	#2; Jerry Dale (NL)	Jim Evans (AL)	#9; John McSherry (NL)
2	October 12	@ NYY	#16; Ed Sudol (NL)	Larry McCoy (AL)	#2; Jerry Dale (NL)	Jim Evans (AL)	#9; John McSherry (NL)	Nestor Chylak (AL) (crew chief)
3	October 14	NYY	Larry McCoy (AL)	#2; Jerry Dale (NL)	Jim Evans (AL)	#9; John McSherry (NL)	Nestor Chylak (AL) (crew chief)	#16; Ed Sudol (NL)
4	October 15	NYY	#2; Jerry Dale (NL)	Jim Evans (AL)	#9; John McSherry (NL)	Nestor Chylak (AL) (crew chief)	#16; Ed Sudol (NL)	Larry McCoy (AL)
5	October 16	NYY	Jim Evans (AL)	#9; John McSherry (NL)	Nestor Chylak (AL) (crew chief)	#16; Ed Sudol (NL)	Larry McCoy (AL)	#2; Jerry Dale (NL)
6	October 18	@ NYY	#9; John McSherry (NL)	Nestor Chylak (AL) (crew chief)	#16; Ed Sudol (NL)	Larry McCoy (AL)	#2; Jerry Dale (NL)	Jim Evans (AL)

== Player stats ==
= Indicates team leader

= Indicates league leader

=== Batting ===
==== Starters by position ====
Note: Pos = Position; G = Games played; AB = At bats; H = Hits; Avg. = Batting average; HR = Home runs; RBI = Runs batted in

Pos	Player	G	AB	H	Avg.	HR	RBI
C	Steve Yeager	125	387	99	.256	16	55
1B	Steve Garvey	162*	696	192	.297	33	115
2B	Davey Lopes	134	502	142	.283	11	53
3B	Ron Cey	153	564	136	.241	30	110
SS	Bill Russell	153	634	176	.278	4	51
LF	Dusty Baker	153	533	155	.291	30	86
CF	Rick Monday	118	392	90	.230	15	48
RF	Reggie Smith	148	488	150	.307	32	87

- Tied with Pete Rose for league lead.

==== Other batters ====
Note: G = Games played; AB = At bats; H = Hits; Avg. = Batting average; HR = Home runs; RBI = Runs batted in

Player	G	AB	H	Avg.	HR	RBI
Lee Lacy	75	169	45	.266	6	21
Glenn Burke	83	169	43	.254	1	13
Johnny Oates	60	156	42	.269	3	11
Ted Martinez	67	137	41	.299	1	10
John Hale	79	108	26	.241	2	11
Ed Goodson	61	66	11	.167	1	5
Vic Davalillo	24	48	15	.313	0	4
Boog Powell	50	41	10	.244	0	5
Manny Mota	50	38	15	.395	1	4
Jerry Grote	18	27	7	.259	0	4
Joe Simpson	29	23	4	.174	0	1
Ron Washington	10	19	7	.368	0	1
Rafael Landestoy	15	18	5	.278	0	0
Jeffrey Leonard	11	10	3	.300	0	2
Kevin Pasley	2	3	1	.333	0	0

=== Pitching ===
==== Starting pitchers ====
Note: G = Games pitched; IP = Innings pitched; W = Wins; L = Losses; ERA = Earned run average; SO = Strikeouts

Player	G	IP	W	L	ERA	SO
Don Sutton	33	240.1	14	8	3.18	150
Burt Hooton	32	223.1	12	7	2.62	153
Tommy John	31	220.1	20	7	2.78	123
Rick Rhoden	31	216.1	16	10	3.74	122
Doug Rau	32	212.1	14	8	3.43	126

==== Other pitchers ====
Note: G = Games pitched; IP = Innings pitched; W = Wins; L = Losses; ERA = Earned run average; SO = Strikeouts

Player	G	IP	W	L	ERA	SO
Al Downing	12	20.0	0	1	6.75	23
Dennis Lewallyn	5	17.0	3	1	4.24	8
Bobby Castillo	6	11.1	0	0	3.97	7
Hank Webb	5	8.0	0	0	2.25	2

==== Relief pitchers ====
Note: G = Games pitched; W = Wins; L = Losses; SV = Saves; ERA = Earned run average; SO = Strikeouts

Player	G	W	L	SV	ERA	SO
Charlie Hough	70	6	12	22	3.32	105
Mike Garman	49	4	4	12	2.73	29
Elias Sosa	44	2	2	1	1.98	47
Stan Wall	25	2	3	0	5.34	22
Lance Rautzhan	25	4	1	2	4.35	13

== Postseason ==
=== 1977 National League Championship Series ===
==== Game One ====
October 4, Dodger Stadium

Team	1	2	3	4	5	6	7	8	9	R	H	E
Philadelphia	2	0	0	0	2	1	0	0	2	7	9	0
Los Angeles	0	0	0	0	1	0	4	0	0	5	9	2
W: Gene Garber (1–0) L: Elías Sosa (0–1) SV: Tug McGraw (1)
HRs: PHI – Greg Luzinski (1); LAD – Ron Cey (1)

==== Game Two ====
October 5, Dodger Stadium

Team	1	2	3	4	5	6	7	8	9	R	H	E
Philadelphia	0	0	1	0	0	0	0	0	0	1	9	1
Los Angeles	0	0	1	4	0	1	1	0	X	7	9	1
W: Don Sutton (1–0) L: Jim Lonborg (0–1)
HRs: PHI – Bake McBride (1); LAD – Dusty Baker (1)

==== Game Three ====
October 7, Veterans Stadium

Team	1	2	3	4	5	6	7	8	9	R	H	E
Los Angeles	0	2	0	1	0	0	0	0	3	6	12	2
Philadelphia	0	3	0	0	0	0	0	2	0	5	6	2
W: Lance Rautzhan (1–0) L: Gene Garber (1–1) SV: Mike Garman (1)
HRs: None

==== Game Four ====
October 8, Veterans Stadium

Team	1	2	3	4	5	6	7	8	9	R	H	E
Los Angeles	0	2	0	0	2	0	0	0	0	4	5	0
Philadelphia	0	0	0	1	0	0	0	0	0	1	7	0
W: Tommy John (1–0) L: Steve Carlton (0–1)
HRs: LAD – Dusty Baker (2)

=== 1977 World Series ===
AL New York Yankees (4) vs. NL Los Angeles Dodgers (2)
Game	Score	Date	Location	Attendance	Time of Game
1	Dodgers – 3, Yankees – 4 (12 inns)	October 11	Yankee Stadium	56,668	3:24
2	Dodgers – 6, Yankees – 1	October 12	Yankee Stadium	56,691	2:27
3	Yankees – 5, Dodgers – 3	October 14	Dodger Stadium	55,992	2:31
4	Yankees – 4, Dodgers – 2	October 15	Dodger Stadium	55,995	2:07
5	Yankees – 4, Dodgers – 10	October 16	Dodger Stadium	55,995	2:29
6	Dodgers – 4, Yankees – 8	October 18	Yankee Stadium	56,407	2:18

== Awards and honors ==
- 1977 Major League Baseball All-Star Game
  - Steve Garvey starter
  - Don Sutton starter
  - Ron Cey starter
  - Reggie Smith reserve
- Major League Baseball All-Star Game MVP Award
  - Don Sutton
- NLCS Most Valuable Player
  - Dusty Baker
- Gold Glove Award
  - Steve Garvey
- TSN National League All-Star
  - Steve Garvey
- NL Player of the Month
  - Ron Cey (April 1977)
- NL Player of the Week
  - Ron Cey (Apr. 18–24)
  - Steve Garvey (June 20–26)
  - Tommy John (Aug. 8–14)

== Farm system ==
Level	Team	League	Manager
AAA	Albuquerque Dukes	Pacific Coast League	James B. Williams
AA	San Antonio Dodgers	Texas League	Don LeJohn
**A**	**Lodi Dodgers**	**California League**	**Stan Wasiak**
A	Clinton Dodgers	Midwest League	Dick McLaughlin
**Rookie**	**Lethbridge Dodgers**	**Pioneer League**	**Gail Henley**

Teams in BOLD won League Championships

== Major League Baseball draft ==
The Dodgers drafted 40 players in the June draft and eight in the January draft. Of those, eight players would eventually play in the Major Leagues.

The first round draft pick in the June draft was pitcher Bob Welch from Eastern Michigan University. In 17 years with the Dodgers and Oakland Athletics he started 462 games with a 211–146 record and a 3.47 ERA. He became a two time All-Star, a two time World Series Champion and won the 1990 American League Cy Young Award.

The draft also included Mickey Hatcher, who hit .280 in 1130 games, mostly as an outfielder and was a part of two Dodgers World Series champions; outfielder/utility player Ron Roenicke who played eight seasons in the Majors before becoming a coach and manager; and relief pitcher Tom Niedenfuer, who was picked in the 36th round but would play 10 seasons in the Majors and save 97 games.

1977 draft picks

=== January draft ===
Round	Name	Position	School	Signed	Career span	Highest level
1	Timothy Gloyd	SS	Sacramento City College	No; Dodgers-1979	1979–1981	A
2	Jessie Daniels	2B	Louisburg College	Yes	1977–1980	A
3	Rocky Cordova	RHP	Sacramento City College	Yes	1977–1981	A
4	Daniel Forer	LHP	Iowa Western Community College	No; Dodgers-1981	1981	A
5	Larry Wright	RHP	Georgia Perimeter College	Yes	1977–1980	A
6	Ronald Grout	1B	Wingate University	No; Twins-1978	1978–1982	AA
7	Randall May	RHP	Yakima Valley Community College	No		

==== January secondary phase ====
Round	Name	Position	School	Signed	Career span	Highest level
1	Mark Wychopen	RHP	San Jacinto College	No		

=== June draft ===
Round	Name	Position	School	Signed	Career span	Highest level
1	Bob Welch	RHP	Eastern Michigan University	Yes	1977–1994	**MLB**
2	Joe Beckwith	RHP	Auburn University	Yes	1977–1986	**MLB**
3	Doug Harrison	RHP	Central Michigan University	Yes	1977–1980	AAA
4	John Bush	SS	Ogden High School	Yes	1977–1979	A-
5	Mickey Hatcher	OF	University of Oklahoma	Yes	1977–1991	**MLB**
6	Mark Elliott	1B	Silver Lake High School	Yes	1977–1979	A
7	Bobby Mitchell	OF	University of Southern California	Yes	1977–1986	**MLB**
8	James Nobles	LHP	Kentucky Wesleyan College	Yes	1977–1982	AA
9	Henry Noble	SS	McIntosh County Academy	Yes	1977	A-
10	Danny Coulon	RHP	College of the Sequoias	Yes	1977–1978	A
11	Jack Littrell	RHP	Oldham County High School	Yes	1977–1980	A
12	Kenneth Likewise	LHP	Chaparral High School	Yes	1977–1978	Rookie
13	Dennis Delaney	C	University of California, Los Angeles	No; Cardinals-1978	1978–1984	AA
14	Jerry Bass	RHP	Georgia Institute of Technology	Yes	1977–1982	AAA
15	Joseph Purpura	LHP	West Leyden High School	Yes	1977–1978	A
16	Jesse Baez	C	Cerritos College	Yes	1977–1983	AA
17	Edward Reilly	RHP	Fanwood High School	No; Astros-1981	1981–1985	AA
18	Salvatore Favata	2B	Edgewood High School	No; Brewers-1980	1980–1982	A
19	Richard Ross	OF	Santa Teresa High School	No		
20	Steven Green	RHP	Pepperell High School	No		
21	Mike Ledna	SS	Buffalo Grove High School	No; White Sox-1981	1981	Rookie
22	Bobby Brown	OF	John Brown University	Yes	1977–1979	AA
23	Mitch Webster	OF	Larned High School	Yes	1977–1995	**MLB**
24	Victor Woods	OF	El Cerrito High School	No; Indians-1979	1979–1982	A
25	Michael Zouras	3B	California State University, Long Beach	Yes	1977–1981	AAA
26	Michael Holt	RHP	East Forsyth High School	Yes	1977–1978	A
27	Mark Jakway	OF	Hemet High School	No		
28	Douglas Hogan	RHP	Mineral Area College	Yes	1977–1978	A
29	Melvin Freeman	3B	Easley High School	No; Brewers-1979	1979	A
30	Tony Bolla	C	Crestmoor High School	No; Giants-1979	1979	A
31	Scott Hadley	RHP	Central High School	No		
32	Ronald Kiene	RHP	Stuyvesant High School	No		
33	Jeffrey Jordan	RHP	Orangeville High School	No		
34	Ken Duckett	OF	Richard J. Reynolds High School	No		
35	John Shoemaker	SS	Miami University of Ohio	Yes	1977–1980	AAA
36	Tom Niedenfuer	RHP	Redmond High School	No; Dodgers-1981	1981–1990	**MLB**
37	Todd Roddy	IF	Bellevue High School	No		

==== June secondary phase ====
Round	Name	Position	School	Signed	Career span	Highest level
1	Ron Roenicke	OF	University of California, Los Angeles	Yes	1977–1989	**MLB**
2	Rick Kranitz	RHP	Yavapai College	No; Brewers-1979	1979–1985	AAA
3	Kevin Williams	OF	Edmonds Community College	No; Twins-1980	1980–1983	AA
