= Tim Jones (pitcher) =

American baseball player (born 1954)

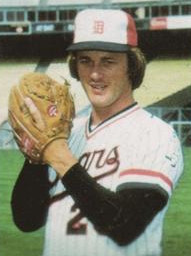
- Jones in 1978
- Pitcher
- Born: January 24, 1954 (age 72); Sacramento, California
- Batted: Both Threw: Right

MLB debut
- September 4, 1977, for the Pittsburgh Pirates

Last MLB appearance
- October 2, 1977, for the Pittsburgh Pirates

MLB statistics
- Games pitched: 3
- Win–loss record: 1–0
- Earned run average: 0.00
- Strikeouts: 5
- Stats at Baseball Reference

Teams
- Pittsburgh Pirates (1977)

Timothy Byron Jones (born January 24, 1954) is a former pitcher in Major League Baseball.

Tim Jones reached the major leagues in September 1977. His first two appearances were in relief in games the Pirates were losing badly, and his third was as the starter in the first game of a doubleheader on the final day of the season. He won that game, pitching 7 shutout innings, and in all pitched 10 major league innings without being scored on. He was traded in March 1978 to the Montreal Expos for Will McEnaney and never appeared in another major league game, his lifetime record unmarred, 1 win, 0 losses, 0.00 ERA. Jones is the only player in MLB history to have pitched at least 10 innings and not allow a single run.

== Teams ==
- Pittsburgh Pirates 1977

== Sources ==
- Career statistics from Baseball Reference · Retrosheet · Baseball Almanac
