= Hal Dues =

American baseball player (1954–2020)

- Pitcher
- Born: September 22, 1954; La Marque, Texas, U.S.
- Died: October 20, 2020 (aged 66); Dickinson, Texas, U.S.
- Batted: Right Threw: Right

MLB debut
- September 9, 1977, for the Montreal Expos

Last MLB appearance
- October 5, 1980, for the Montreal Expos

MLB statistics
- Win–loss record: 6–8
- Earned run average: 3.08
- Strikeouts: 47
- Stats at Baseball Reference

Teams
- Montreal Expos (1977–1978, 1980)

Hal Joseph Dues (September 22, 1954 - October 20, 2020) was an American professional baseball player and former Major League pitcher. The 6 ft 3 in (1.91 m), 180 lb (82 kg) right-hander played for the Montreal Expos in 1977 and 1978, and again in 1980.

== Career ==
Signed as an undrafted free agent by Montreal on May 20, 1974, after attending the University of Mary Hardin-Baylor, Belton, Texas, Dues appeared in 37 games in the Majors, 17 as a starting pitcher. He spent the entire 1978 campaign with the Expos, working in 25 games (including 12 starts) and 99 innings pitched, and compiling a low 2.36 earned run average. He threw his only MLB complete game on July 8 against the Philadelphia Phillies, a six-hit, 8–1 victory at Veterans Stadium; Dues helped himself as a batsman that day, with two hits in four at bats with a run batted in and a run scored.

All told as a Major Leaguer, he allowed 128 hits and 55 bases on balls in 1341/3 innings pitched, with 47 career strikeouts. On June 17, 1978, in Dodgers Stadium, Dues pitched the final 4 innings of a 6-3 Expos victory, registering his only career major league save.

Dues died October 20, 2020.
