= Al Hrabosky =

American baseball player (born 1949)

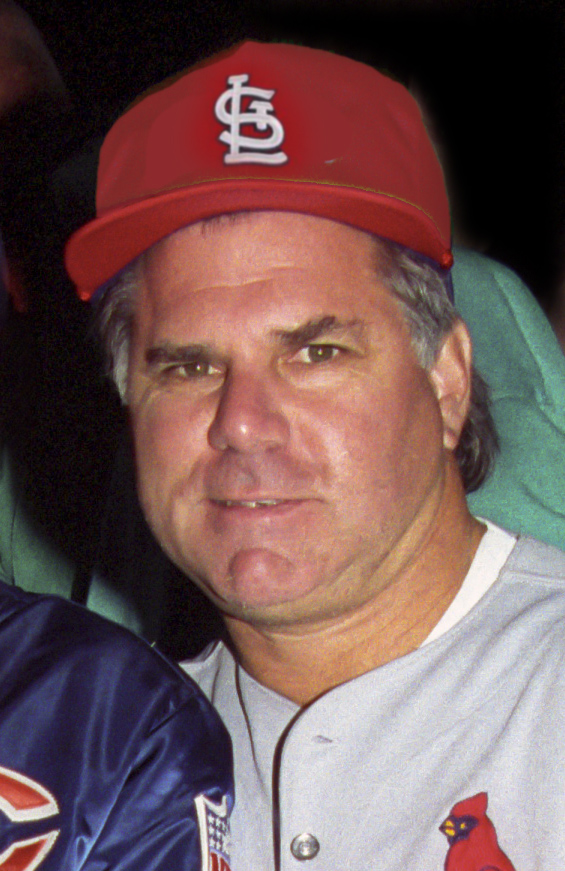
- Hrabosky in 1995
- Pitcher
- Born: July 21, 1949 (age 77); Oakland, California, U.S.
- Batted: Right Threw: Left

MLB debut
- June 16, 1970, for the St. Louis Cardinals

Last MLB appearance
- August 18, 1982, for the Atlanta Braves

MLB statistics
- Win–loss record: 64–35
- Earned run average: 3.10
- Strikeouts: 548
- Saves: 97
- Stats at Baseball Reference

Teams
- St. Louis Cardinals (1970–1977); Kansas City Royals (1978–1979); Atlanta Braves (1980–1982)

Career highlights and awards
- NL saves leader (1975); St. Louis Cardinals Hall of Fame

Alan Thomas Hrabosky (/rəˈbɒski/; born July 21, 1949) is an American sports commentator and former professional baseball pitcher who is a telecast commentator for the St. Louis Cardinals of Major League Baseball (MLB). He played 13 seasons in MLB for the Cardinals, Kansas City Royals, and Atlanta Braves.

Hrabosky's nickname is "the Mad Hungarian" because of his unusual last name and colorful character.

== Playing career ==
Hrabosky played baseball and football at Savanna High School in Anaheim, California. He was selected by the Minnesota Twins in the eleventh round of the 1967 amateur draft. Instead of signing with the club, he enrolled at Fullerton College. At Fullerton, Hrabosky set career records for most strikeouts (264), most innings pitched (197), and most strikeouts/9 innings pitched (14.07). His 26 games started is 4th on the Hornets’ all-time list, as is his 2.01 career ERA. Hrabosky is only one of two Hornet players ever to throw a no-hitter.

=== St. Louis Cardinals ===
In January 1969, the Cardinals made him their first round choice. He appeared in fewer than 50 games in the Minor Leagues and, at the age of twenty, he made his Major League debut with a scoreless inning against the San Diego Padres on June 16, 1970.

He bounced between the majors and the minors for the next three seasons before finally sticking with the Cardinals in 1974, when he had a breakout season, going 8-1 with a 2.95 ERA over 88 innings of work.

Hrabosky became a Cardinals fan favorite for his antics on the mound. When entering a game, he would turn his back to the batter, walk towards second base, vigorously rub the ball between his palms several times, take a deep breath, and pound the ball into his mitt. He then stormed back to the mound and stared down the batter; although the home crowd would roar in delight, most batters were not fond of the routine.

Hrabosky led the National League in saves in 1975 with 22 (a career-best) en route to winning The Sporting News "NL Fireman of the Year" award. He had a career-high in wins, posting a 13–3 record with an ERA of 1.67.

Early in his career with the Cardinals, Hrabosky enhanced his menacing appearance with long hair and a horseshoe moustache. When Vern Rapp became Cardinals manager in 1977, he imposed a grooming code on the players; Hrabosky cut his hair and shaved the moustache despite his vehement opposition. He explained, "Relief pitching is 75 per cent mental. How am I going to scare hell out of the hitters with my new image? How am I going to convince them I'm a dangerous madman if I look like a golf-pro? I've never been blessed with great ability. My mystique was what made me successful." The enmity between Hrabosky and Rapp persisted throughout the season and included the former being suspended on May 21 for what Cardinals management stated as "rank insubordination."

Perhaps Hrabosky's most memorable performance came in 1977 during an ABC Monday Night Baseball game against the Cincinnati Reds on May 9. In the top of the ninth with the game tied at 5–5, Hrabosky allowed the first three hitters (all left-handed: Ken Griffey, Joe Morgan, and Dan Driessen) to reach base and load the bases. As the Redbirds home crowd roared, Hrabosky went into his "Mad Hungarian" routine and proceeded to strike out right-handed power hitters George Foster, Johnny Bench, and Bob Bailey. The Cardinals went on to win 6–5 on a Ted Simmons home run in the tenth inning.

=== Kansas City Royals ===
Hrabosky was traded from the Cardinals to the Kansas City Royals for Mark Littell and Buck Martinez during the Winter Meetings on December 8, 1977. In 1978, he went 8–7 for the Royals, and posted a 2.88 ERA with twenty saves in 75 innings of work in 58 appearances. Hrabosky had sixty strikeouts and 35 walks while allowing fewer hits and runs than the year before. He appeared in three games of the ALCS that year, his first and only time pitching in the postseason. He pitched in the eighth inning of the first three games, allowing a combined total of three hits and one run, but the Royals lost to the New York Yankees for a third straight year, this time in four games.

In the following year, Hrabosky went 9–4 with a 3.74 ERA and eleven saves in 65 innings. He allowed more hits and runs (67 and 31, respectively) while having 39 strikeouts and ten walks. He was granted free agency after the season, and signed with the Atlanta Braves.

=== Atlanta Braves ===
During his time with the Braves, Hrabosky saw diminished playing time and recorded just seven saves over three seasons. Hrabosky's last appearance in the majors was in 1982, at Atlanta-Fulton County Stadium against the Montreal Expos on August 18. He pitched the final two innings of a blowout, allowing four runs on four hits with a strikeout and two home runs (by Andre Dawson and Tim Wallach) allowed in a 12–2 loss.

Twelve days later, he was released by the Braves. Hrabosky signed with the Chicago White Sox during spring training in 1983, but retired before the season began.

In 13 seasons, Hrabosky recorded 64 wins, 35 losses, and 97 saves with an ERA of 3.10.

== Broadcasting career ==
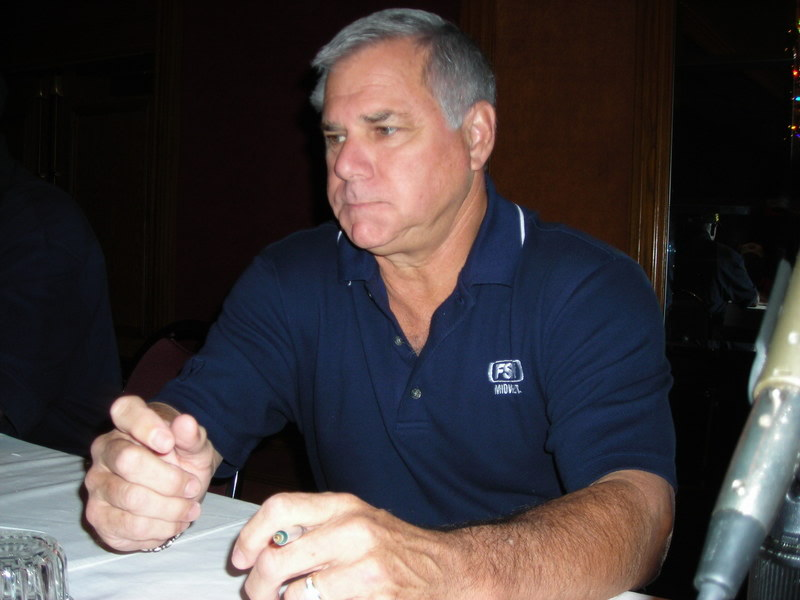
Hrabosky in 2007

Hrabosky has provided color commentary for Cardinals games since 1985 and has been with FanDuel Sports Midwest since 1997. He also hosted his own radio show on KFNS 590AM in St. Louis. Hrabosky also serves as an occasional fill-in analyst on the Cardinals Radio Network.

== Personal life ==
Hrabosky and his wife June reside in St. Louis. The couple have four daughters – Tiffany, Nickie, Kim, and Lisa – and two grandsons, West and Ford.

== See also ==
- List of Major League Baseball annual saves leaders
