= Warren Brusstar =

American baseball player (born 1952)

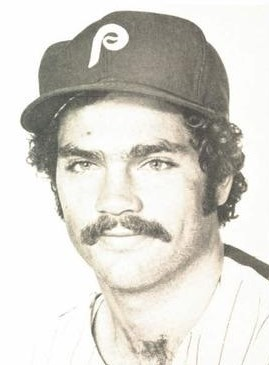
- Pitcher
- Born: February 2, 1952 (age 74); Oakland, California, U.S.
- Batted: Right Threw: Right

MLB debut
- May 6, 1977, for the Philadelphia Phillies

Last MLB appearance
- October 3, 1985, for the Chicago Cubs

MLB statistics
- Win–loss record: 28–16
- Earned run average: 3.51
- Strikeouts: 273
- Stats at Baseball Reference

Teams
- Philadelphia Phillies (1977–1982); Chicago White Sox (1982); Chicago Cubs (1983–1985)

Career highlights and awards
- World Series champion (1980)

Warren Scott Brusstar (born February 2, 1952) is an American former professional baseball pitcher, who played nine years in Major League Baseball (MLB), for the Philadelphia Phillies, Chicago White Sox, and Chicago Cubs. He is currently the pitching coach at Napa Valley College. Brusstar was inducted into the Napa Valley College Athletic Hall of Fame in 2011.

== Amateur career ==
Brusstar, who batted and threw right-handed, graduated from Napa High School in 1970, and was selected by the San Francisco Giants in the 27th round (635th overall) of the 1970 MLB draft. He chose not to sign, and played college baseball at Fresno State University. In 1971, he played collegiate summer baseball with the Chatham A's of the Cape Cod Baseball League. He was selected by the Giants again in the 1971 MLB draft, this time in the sixth round (114th overall). Again, the 6 ft 3 in (1.91 m), 200 pound Brusstar did not sign. He would have to wait until the 1973 MLB draft to be selected again, this time by the New York Mets in the 33rd round (684th), but again did not sign. In the 1974 MLB draft, the Phillies were able to sign Brusstar after drafting him in the fourth round (67th).

== Minor leagues ==
Brusstar was a very successful starter and reliever in the minor leagues. His ERA never reached 3.00 in any of the years he played before making his major league debut (the highest it reached was 2.71), although in two seasons he walked 90 or more batters.

== Major leagues ==
On May 6, 1977, at the age of 25, Brusstar made his major league debut with the Phillies when he was called up to replace Tug McGraw on the team's roster after McGraw suffered an elbow injury. He would never start a game in his career, because he was used primarily as a middle reliever. In only three seasons did Brusstar appear in over 50 games in a season, because he was constantly hampered by elbow and shoulder problems. However, he did win a World Series title in 1980 as a member of the Phillies. He played his last game on October 3, 1985.

== Transactions ==
On August 30, 1982, the Chicago White Sox purchased Brusstar from the Phillies. He would end up only pitching ten games for the White Sox. On January 25, 1983, the Chicago White Sox made a trade sending Brusstar and Steve Trout to the Cubs for Scott Fletcher, Pat Tabler, Randy Martz, and Dick Tidrow. Bill Buckner, who also graduated from Napa High School, was a teammate with Brusstar for a year and a half while they played for the Cubs.

== Personal ==
Brusstar's wife Jennifer is the president and chief executive of the Tug McGraw Foundation. Brusstar and McGraw were teammates for several years on the Philadelphia Phillies.
