= John Sutton (baseball) =

American baseball player (born 1952)

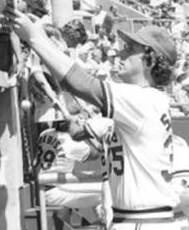
- Sutton with the St. Louis Cardinals in 1977
- Pitcher
- Born: November 13, 1952 (age 73); Dallas, Texas, U.S.
- Batted: Right Threw: Right

MLB debut
- April 7, 1977, for the St. Louis Cardinals

Last MLB appearance
- September 29, 1978, for the Minnesota Twins

MLB statistics
- Win–loss record: 2–1
- Earned run average: 3.15
- Strikeouts: 27
- Stats at Baseball Reference

Teams
- St. Louis Cardinals (1977); Minnesota Twins (1978)

Johnny Ike Sutton (born November 13, 1952) is an American former Major League Baseball pitcher. Sutton played for the St. Louis Cardinals in 1977 and the Minnesota Twins in 1978.

Sutton was selected by the Texas Rangers in the third round (48th overall) of the January primary phase of the 1974 MLB draft. He was traded from the Rangers to the Cardinals for Mike Wallace on October 22, 1976. He was picked by the Twins from the Cardinals in the Rule 5 draft on December 5, 1977.
