= Larry Landreth =

Canadian baseball player (born 1955)

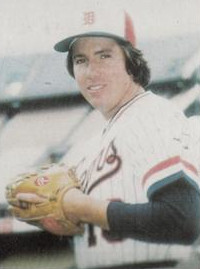
- Landreth in 1978
- Pitcher
- Born: March 11, 1955 (age 71); Stratford, Ontario, Canada
- Batted: Right Threw: Right

MLB debut
- September 16, 1976, for the Montreal Expos

Last MLB appearance
- September 30, 1977, for the Montreal Expos

MLB statistics
- Win–loss record: 1–4
- Earned run average: 6.64
- Strikeouts: 12
- Stats at Baseball Reference

Teams
- Montreal Expos (1976–1977)

Larry Robert Landreth (born March 11, 1955) is a Canadian former professional baseball player and a former pitcher in the Major Leagues who appeared in seven games for the Montreal Expos in 1976–1977. The right-hander stood 6 feet 1 inch (1.85 m) tall and weighed 175 pounds (79 kg) (12 stone 7) during his active career.

Landreth was 18 years of age when he signed with Montreal on March 28, 1973, after playing amateur baseball in his native city. He became the first baseball player from Stratford to reach the Major Leagues. In 1976, his fourth professional season, he won 13 games for the Double-A Quebec Metros and was recalled by the parent Expos for a September trial. In his MLB debut, on September 16 at Parc Jarry, he drew the starting assignment against the Chicago Cubs and pitched six shutout innings, allowing four hits but six bases on balls. Despite the baserunners, he left the game with a 1–0 lead and Montreal held on to win, 4–3, for Landreth's only Major League victory. Control issues plagued Landreth again in his next start six days later against the New York Mets, as he walked four in only 12/3 innings and allowed three earned runs; Landreth absorbed the loss as Montreal fell, 4–2.

All told, in his seven big-league games (including three other starts), Landreth allowed 29 hits and 18 bases on balls in 201/3 innings pitched. He continued his career in minor league baseball through 1979.
