= Bill Atkinson (baseball) =

Canadian baseball player (born 1954)

- Pitcher
- Born: October 4, 1954 (age 71); Chatham, Ontario, Canada
- Batted: Left Threw: Right

MLB debut
- September 18, 1976, for the Montreal Expos

Last MLB appearance
- September 26, 1979, for the Montreal Expos

MLB statistics
- Win–loss record: 11–4
- Earned run average: 3.42
- Strikeouts: 99
- Stats at Baseball Reference

Teams
- Montreal Expos (1976–1979)

William Cecil Glenn Atkinson (born October 4, 1954) is a Canadian former professional baseball player and a former Major League Baseball (MLB) relief pitcher. The 5 ft 7 in (1.70 m), 165 lb (75 kg) (11 stone 11) right-hander was signed by the Montreal Expos as an amateur free agent on October 4, 1971, and he played for them from 1976 to 1979.

== Professional career ==
=== Montreal Expos ===
In 1972, Atkinson's first professional season, he was assigned to the Short-Season Jamestown Falcons. He was 3–3 with a 3.60 ERA in 19 games, all in relief.

Atkinson played for the Class-A West Palm Beach Expos in 1973. He was 8–7 with a 3.03 ERA in 35 games, 13 starts.

In 1974 Atkinson was promoted to the Double-A Quebec Carnavals. He compiled a record of 7–8 with a 3.70 ERA in 33 games, 20 for starts.

Atkinson continued his climb through the Expos organization in 1975. He was promoted to the Triple-A Memphis Blues where he compiled a record of 3–4 with a 2.80 ERA with 5 saves in 49 games, three starts.

At the age of 21 Atkinson split the 1976 season between the Triple-A Denver Bears and Montreal. With Denver he was 6–3 with a 3.99 ERA with 15 saves in 51 games, all in relief. Atkinson made his MLB debut against the St. Louis Cardinals on September 18 at Jarry Park Stadium. He entered game one of the doubleheader in the top of the fourth with Montreal trailing 4–0, and he proceeded to pitch three scoreless innings of relief before being lifted for a pinch hitter. He had allowed three hits, struck out one, and walked no one. He finished the season pitching five scoreless innings in four games.

In 1977 Atkinson spent the entire season with the Expos. He went 7–2 with a 3.35 ERA with seven in 55 games. Atkinson spent the entire '77 season with the Expos, the only time in his career this would be achieved.

Atkinson split the 1978 season between the Expos and the Bears. With the Expos he compiled a record of 2–2 with a 4.37 ERA in 14 games. With the Bears he was 1–3 with a dismal 7.41 ERA in 23 games.

In Atkinson's last season with the Expos organization, 1979, he again split the season between the Bears and the Expos. With the Bears he was 9–6 with a 4.14 ERA in 36 games, 23 starts. With the Expos he was 2–0 with a 1.98 ERA in 10 games.

=== Chicago White Sox ===
Atkinson was purchased by the Chicago White Sox on December 12, 1979 but never again reached the major league level.

With the Iowa Oaks in the 1980 he compiled a record of 3–5 with a 4.60 ERA in 55 games, two starts.

In 1981 with the Triple-A Edmonton Trappers Atkinson went 8–8 with a 5.48 ERA in 36 games, 16 starts.

His last two seasons were spent up and down the White Sox organization. In 1982 with the Double-A Glens Falls White Sox he went 6–9 with a 2.85 ERA in 56 games, two starts. He split the 1983 season between the Class-A Appleton Foxes and the Triple-A Denver Bears going a combined 6–5 with a 3.71 ERA in 32 games, five starts.

== Personal life ==
After retirement, he returned to Chatham and played senior baseball there until 1999.

== See also ==
- List of Major League Baseball players from Canada
