= 1977 Chicago Cubs season =

1977 Chicago Cubs
- League: National League
- Division: East
- Ballpark: Wrigley Field
- City: Chicago
- Record: 81–81 (.500)
- Divisional place: 4th
- Owners: Philip K. Wrigley, William Wrigley III
- General managers: Bob Kennedy
- Managers: Herman Franks
- Television: WGN-TV (Jack Brickhouse, Lou Boudreau)
- Radio: WGN (Vince Lloyd, Lou Boudreau)
- Stats: ESPN.com; Baseball Reference

The 1977 Chicago Cubs season was the 106th season of the Chicago Cubs franchise, the 102nd in the National League and the 62nd at Wrigley Field. The Cubs finished fourth in the National League East with a record of 81–81, 20 games behind the Philadelphia Phillies.

== Offseason ==
On November 24, 1976, Bob Kennedy was named head of baseball operations for the Cubs. His first move was to inform Jim Marshall that he was fired as manager. Salty Saltwell‚ after a year as general manager‚ was named secretary and director of park operations. After Leo Durocher turned down an offer from Cubs owner Philip K. Wrigley to manage the Cubs for the 1977 season, Herman Franks‚ who had briefly been a Cubs coach under Leo Durocher‚ was named the new manager.

=== Notable transactions ===
- December 6, 1976: Willie Hernández was drafted by the Cubs from the Philadelphia Phillies in the 1976 rule 5 draft.
- December 8, 1976: Julio González was traded by the Cubs to the Houston Astros for Greg Gross.
- January 11, 1977: Rick Monday and Mike Garman were traded by Cubs to the Los Angeles Dodgers for Bill Buckner, Iván DeJesús and Jeff Albert (minors).
- January 17, 1977: Geoff Zahn was released by the Cubs.
- February 5, 1977: Darold Knowles was traded by the Cubs to the Texas Rangers for a player to be named later and cash. The Rangers completed the trade by sending Gene Clines to the Cubs on February 15.
- February 11, 1977: Bill Madlock and Rob Sperring were traded by the Cubs to the San Francisco Giants for Bobby Murcer, Steve Ontiveros, and Andy Muhlstock (minors).
- February 16, 1977: Champ Summers was traded by the Cubs to the Cincinnati Reds for Dave Schneck.
- February 28, 1977: Buddy Schultz was traded by the Cubs to the St. Louis Cardinals for Mark Covert (minors).
- March 15, 1977: Joe Coleman was traded by the Cubs to the Oakland Athletics for Jim Todd.
- March 15, 1977: Jerry Tabb was purchased from the Cubs by the Oakland Athletics.
- March 15, 1977: Jim Tyrone was traded by the Cubs to the Oakland Athletics for Gaylen Pitts.

== Regular season ==
In 1977, the franchise experienced one of its biggest collapses. The Cubs hit a high-water mark on June 28 at 47–22 with an 8½-game National League East lead led by Bobby Murcer, who had 27 home runs and 89 RBI overall during the season, and Rick Reuschel, who had a record of 20–10. However, the Philadelphia Phillies cut the lead to two by the All-Star break, as the Cubs sat 19 games over .500, and the Cubs swooned late in the season, going 20–40 after July 31, finishing in fourth place at 81–81.

On July 28, with the Cubs down 14–10 in the eighth inning of a game against the Cincinnati Reds, the Cubs pinch-hit for both of their middle infielders, replacing shortstop Iván DeJesús with José Cardenal and second baseman Mick Kelleher with Greg Gross. The Cubs scored three runs, making the score 14–13 going into the ninth inning. Since both replacements were typically outfielders, and the Cubs had just one player left on the bench who normally played middle infield to enter the game in the ninth inning, utilityman Dave Rosello, the Cubs allowed Cardenal to stay in the game and play second base while Rosello entered the game at shortstop. Rosello and Cardenal alternated between the two positions during the ninth inning depending on whether the batter was a left-handed or right-handed hitter. The Reds failed to score in the ninth, and the Cubs tied the game, forcing extra innings. At that point, the Cubs moved Cardenal to right field, and brought Bobby Murcer in to play the infield instead, continuing to flip-flop the positioning of Rosello and Murcer for the remainder of the game, which wound up going thirteen innings. In all, Rosello wound up switching positions twelve times, and Murcer eight times.

=== Season standings ===
NL East
Team	W	L	Pct.	GB	Home	Road
Philadelphia Phillies	101	61	.623	—	60‍–‍21	41‍–‍40
Pittsburgh Pirates	96	66	.593	5	58‍–‍23	38‍–‍43
St. Louis Cardinals	83	79	.512	18	52‍–‍31	31‍–‍48
Chicago Cubs	81	81	.500	20	46‍–‍35	35‍–‍46
Montreal Expos	75	87	.463	26	38‍–‍43	37‍–‍44
New York Mets	64	98	.395	37	35‍–‍44	29‍–‍54

=== Record vs. opponents ===
1977 National League record Sources:
Team	ATL	CHC	CIN	HOU	LAD	MON	NYM	PHI	PIT	SD	SF	STL
Atlanta	—	5–7	4–14	9–9	5–13	6–6	7–5	2–10	3–9	11–7	8–10	1–11
Chicago	7–5	—	7–5	6–6	6–6	10–8	9–9	6–12	7–11	7–5	9–3	7–11
Cincinnati	14–4	5–7	—	5–13	10–8	7–5	10–2	8–4	3–9	11–7	10–8	5–7
Houston	9–9	6–6	13–5	—	9–9	8–4	6–6	4–8	4–8	8–10	9–9	5–7
Los Angeles	13–5	6–6	8–10	9–9	—	7–5	8–4	6–6	9–3	12–6	14–4	6–6
Montreal	6–6	8–10	5–7	4–8	5–7	—	10–8	7–11	7–11	5–7	6–6	12–6
New York	5–7	9–9	2–10	6–6	4–8	8–10	—	5–13	4–14	6–6	7–5	8–10
Philadelphia	10-2	12–6	4–8	8–4	6–6	11–7	13–5	—	8–10	9–3	9–3	11–7
Pittsburgh	9–3	11–7	9–3	8–4	3–9	11–7	14–4	10–8	—	10–2	2–10	9–9
San Diego	7–11	5–7	7–11	10–8	6–12	7–5	6–6	3–9	2–10	—	8–10	8–4
San Francisco	10–8	3–9	8–10	9–9	4–14	6–6	5–7	3–9	10–2	10–8	—	7–5
St. Louis	11–1	11–7	7–5	7–5	6–6	6–12	10–8	7–11	9–9	4–8	5–7	—

=== Notable transactions ===
- April 20, 1977: The Cubs traded a player to be named later to the Seattle Mariners for Pete Broberg. The Cubs completed the deal by sending Jim Todd to the Mariners on October 25.
- May 28, 1977: Ramón Hernández was traded by the Cubs to the Boston Red Sox for Bobby Darwin.
- June 7, 1977: Terry Francona was drafted by the Cubs in the 2nd round of the 1977 Major League Baseball draft, but did not sign.
- August 23, 1977: Bobby Darwin was released by the Cubs.
- September 28, 1977: Rudy Meoli was purchased by the Cubs from the Cincinnati Reds.

=== Roster ===
1977 Chicago Cubs
Roster
Pitchers: 33 Bill Bonham; 40 Pete Broberg; 34 Ray Burris; 44 Dave Giusti; 36 Ramón Hernández; 38 Willie Hernández; 39 Mike Krukow; 47 Dennis Lamp; 49 Donnie Moore; 50 Steve Renko; 43 Paul Reuschel; 48 Rick Reuschel; 41 Dave Roberts; 42 Bruce Sutter; 31 Jim Todd	Catchers: 23 Mike Gordon; 4 Randy Hundley; 15 George Mitterwald; 9 Steve Swisher; Infielders: 26 Larry Biittner; 22 Bill Buckner; 11 Iván DeJesús; 20 Mick Kelleher; 16 Steve Ontiveros; 17 Dave Rosello; 10 Mike Sember; 19 Manny Trillo	Outfielders: 30 Mike Adams; 1 José Cardenal; 18 Gene Clines; 12 Bobby Darwin; 21 Greg Gross; 24 Jerry Morales; 7 Bobby Murcer; 27 Joe Wallis	Manager: 3 Herman Franks; Coaches: 45 Jack Bloomfield; 5 Alvin Dark; 4 Randy Hundley; 2 Peanuts Lowrey; 6 Barney Schultz

== Player stats ==
= Indicates team leader

=== Batting ===
==== Starters by position ====
Note: Pos = Position; G = Games played; AB = At bats; H = Hits; Avg. = Batting average; HR = Home runs; RBI = Runs batted in

Pos	Player	G	AB	H	Avg.	HR	RBI
C	George Mitterwald	110	349	83	.238	9	43
1B	Bill Buckner	122	426	121	.284	11	60
2B	Manny Trillo	152	504	141	.280	7	57
3B	Steve Ontiveros	156	546	163	.299	10	68
SS	Iván DeJesús	155	624	166	.266	3	40
LF	José Cardenal	100	226	54	.239	3	18
CF	Jerry Morales	136	490	142	.290	11	69
RF	Bobby Murcer	154	554	147	.265	27	89

==== Other batters ====
Note: G = Games played; AB = At bats; H = Hits; Avg. = Batting average; HR = Home runs; RBI = Runs batted in

Player	G	AB	H	Avg.	HR	RBI
Larry Biittner	138	493	147	.298	12	62
Greg Gross	115	239	77	.322	5	32
Gene Clines	101	239	70	.293	3	41
Steve Swisher	74	205	39	.190	5	15
Mick Kelleher	63	122	28	.230	0	11
Dave Rosello	56	82	18	.220	1	9
Joe Wallis	56	80	20	.250	2	8
Mike Gordon	8	23	1	.043	0	2
Bobby Darwin	11	12	2	.167	0	0
Mike Sember	3	4	1	.250	0	0
Randy Hundley	2	4	0	.000	0	0
Mike Adams	2	2	0	.000	0	0

=== Pitching ===
==== Starting pitchers ====
Note: G = Games pitched; IP = Innings pitched; W = Wins; L = Losses; ERA = Earned run average; SO = Strikeouts

Player	G	IP	W	L	ERA	SO
Rick Reuschel	39	252.0	20	10	2.79	166
Ray Burris	39	221.0	14	16	4.72	105
Bill Bonham	34	214.2	10	13	4.36	134
Mike Krukow	34	172.0	8	14	4.40	106

==== Other pitchers ====
Note: G = Games pitched; IP = Innings pitched; W = Wins; L = Losses; ERA = Earned run average; SO = Strikeouts

Player	G	IP	W	L	ERA	SO
Dave Roberts	17	53.0	1	1	3.23	23
Steve Renko	13	51.1	2	2	4.56	34
Dennis Lamp	11	30.0	0	2	6.30	12

==== Relief pitchers ====
Note: G = Games pitched; W = Wins; L = Losses; SV = Saves; ERA = Earned run average; SO = Strikeouts

Player	G	W	L	SV	ERA	SO
Bruce Sutter	62	7	3	31	1.34	129
Paul Reuschel	69	5	6	4	4.37	62
Willie Hernández	67	8	7	4	3.03	78
Donnie Moore	27	4	2	0	4.07	34
Pete Broberg	22	1	2	0	4.75	20
Jim Todd	20	1	1	0	9.10	17
Dave Giusti	20	0	2	1	6.04	15
Ramón Hernández	6	0	0	1	8.22	4
Larry Biittner	1	0	0	0	40.50	3

== Farm system ==
Level	Team	League	Manager
AAA	Wichita Aeros	American Association	Harry Dunlop
AA	Midland Cubs	Texas League	Jim Saul
A	Pompano Beach Cubs	Florida State League	Jack Hiatt
A-Short Season	Geneva Cubs	New York–Penn League	Bob Hartsfield
Rookie	GCL Cubs	Gulf Coast League	Ron Matney
