= 1979 Chicago Cubs season =

1979 Chicago Cubs
- League: National League
- Division: East
- Ballpark: Wrigley Field
- City: Chicago
- Record: 80–82 (.494)
- Divisional place: 5th
- Owners: William Wrigley III
- General managers: Bob Kennedy
- Managers: Herman Franks, Joey Amalfitano
- Television: WGN-TV (Jack Brickhouse, Lou Boudreau)
- Radio: WGN (Vince Lloyd, Lou Boudreau)
- Stats: ESPN.com; Baseball Reference

The 1979 Chicago Cubs season was the 108th season of the Chicago Cubs franchise, the 104th in the National League and the 64th at Wrigley Field, and the first to be beamed via satellite and cable television to viewers all over the United States on WGN Television, thanks to a postseason decision by the company management to uplink its broadcast signals via satellite with the help of Oklahoma-based United Video Satellite Group, making them the pioneer superstation in the country's midwest and the Cubs games of that season the third superstation baseball broadcasts live via satellite relay after the Braves and the Yankees. It was the first season of over 40 to be broadcast all over the country, slowly making the team a national brand. The Cubs finished fifth in the National League East with a record of 80–82. This was the first season in which the players last names appeared on the uniforms but only on the away jerseys. It wouldn't be until 1993 when names would appear on the home jerseys.

== Offseason ==
- October 26, 1978: Rudy Meoli was released by the Cubs.
- February 23, 1979: Manny Trillo, Greg Gross, and Dave Rader were traded by the Cubs to the Philadelphia Phillies for Barry Foote, Ted Sizemore, Jerry Martin, Derek Botelho, and Henry Mack (minors).
- March 20, 1979: The Cubs traded a player to be named later to the Detroit Tigers for Steve Dillard. The Cubs completed the deal by sending Ed Putman to the Tigers on March 24.

== Regular season ==
On May 17, the Phillies beat the Cubs 23–22 at Wrigley Field in ten innings, with a 30-mph wind blowing out to left field. This was only the second time since 1913 that both teams scored 20 or more runs in a game, the only previous instance also being a Cubs–Phillies game.

=== Season standings ===
NL East
Team	W	L	Pct.	GB	Home	Road
Pittsburgh Pirates	98	64	.605	—	48‍–‍33	50‍–‍31
Montreal Expos	95	65	.594	2	56‍–‍25	39‍–‍40
St. Louis Cardinals	86	76	.531	12	42‍–‍39	44‍–‍37
Philadelphia Phillies	84	78	.519	14	43‍–‍38	41‍–‍40
Chicago Cubs	80	82	.494	18	45‍–‍36	35‍–‍46
New York Mets	63	99	.389	35	28‍–‍53	35‍–‍46

=== Record vs. opponents ===
1979 National League record Sources:
Team	ATL	CHC	CIN	HOU	LAD	MON	NYM	PHI	PIT	SD	SF	STL
Atlanta	—	4–8	6–12	7–11	12–6	1–9	4–8	7–5	4–8	6–12	11–7	4–8
Chicago	8–4	—	7–5	6–6	5–7	6–12	8–10	9–9	6–12	9–3	8–4	8–10
Cincinnati	12–6	5–7	—	8–10	11–7	6–6	8–4	8–4	8–4	10–7	6–12	8–4
Houston	11–7	6–6	10–8	—	10–8	7–5	9–3	5–7	4–8	14–4	7–11	6–6
Los Angeles	6–12	7–5	7–11	8–10	—	6–6	9–3	3–9	4–8	9–9	14–4	6–6
Montreal	9–1	12–6	6–6	5–7	6–6	—	15–3	11–7	7–11	7–5	7–5	10–8
New York	8–4	10–8	4–8	3–9	3–9	3–15	—	5–13	8–10	4–8	8–4	7–11
Philadelphia	5–7	9–9	4–8	7–5	9–3	7–11	13–5	—	8–10	9–3	6–6	7–11
Pittsburgh	8–4	12–6	4–8	8–4	8–4	11–7	10–8	10–8	—	7–5	9–3	11–7
San Diego	12–6	3–9	7–10	4–14	9–9	5–7	8–4	3–9	5–7	—	8–10	4–8
San Francisco	7–11	4–8	12–6	11–7	4–14	5–7	4–8	6–6	3–9	10–8	—	5–7
St. Louis	8–4	10–8	4–8	6–6	6–6	8–10	11–7	11–7	7–11	8–4	7–5	—

=== Notable transactions ===
- May 23, 1979: Ray Burris was traded by the Cubs to the New York Yankees for Dick Tidrow.
- June 26, 1979: Bobby Murcer was traded by the Cubs to the New York Yankees for Paul Semall (minors).
- August 17, 1979: Ted Sizemore was traded by the Cubs to the Boston Red Sox for a player to be named later and cash. The Red Sox completed the trade by sending Mike O'Berry to the Cubs on October 23, 1979.

=== Roster ===
1979 Chicago Cubs
Roster
Pitchers: 34 Ray Burris; 35 Doug Capilla; 36 Bill Caudill; 46 Dave Geisel; 38 Willie Hernández; 30 Ken Holtzman; 39 Mike Krukow; 47 Dennis Lamp; 40 Lynn McGlothen; 49 Donnie Moore; 48 Rick Reuschel; 33 George Riley; 42 Bruce Sutter; 41 Dick Tidrow	Catchers: 9 Tim Blackwell; 8 Barry Foote; 7 Bruce Kimm; Infielders: 22 Bill Buckner; 29 Steve Davis; 11 Iván DeJesús; 15 Steve Dillard; 20 Mick Kelleher; 12 Steve Macko; 16 Steve Ontiveros; 17 Kurt Seibert; 6 Ted Sizemore	Outfielders: 26 Larry Biittner; 32 Miguel Diloné; 24 Ken Henderson; 10 Dave Kingman; 28 Jerry Martin; 32 Sam Mejías; 7 Bobby Murcer; 25 Scot Thompson; 27 Mike Vail; Other batters: 18 Gene Clines; 45 Karl Pagel	Manager: 5 Joey Amalfitano; 3 Herman Franks; Coaches: 5 Joey Amalfitano; 2 Peanuts Lowrey; 4 Mike Roarke; 1 Cookie Rojas

== Player stats ==
= Indicates team leader

=== Batting ===
==== Starters by position ====
Note: Pos = Position; G = Games played; AB = At bats; H = Hits; Avg. = Batting average; HR = Home runs; RBI = Runs batted in

Pos	Player	G	AB	H	Avg.	HR	RBI
C	Barry Foote	132	429	109	.254	16	56
1B	Bill Buckner	149	591	168	.284	14	66
2B	Ted Sizemore	98	330	82	.248	2	24
SS	Iván DeJesús	160	636	180	.283	5	52
3B	Steve Ontiveros	152	519	148	.285	4	57
LF	Dave Kingman	145	532	153	.288	48	115
CF	Jerry Martin	150	534	145	.272	19	73
RF	Scot Thompson	128	346	100	.289	2	29

==== Other batters ====
Note: G = Games played; AB = At bats; H = Hits; Avg. = Batting average; HR = Home runs; RBI = Runs batted in

Player	G	AB	H	Avg.	HR	RBI
Larry Biitner	111	272	79	.290	3	50
Bobby Murcer	58	190	49	.258	7	22
Mike Vail	87	179	60	.335	7	35
Steve Dillard	89	166	47	.283	5	24
Mick Kelleher	73	142	36	.254	0	10
Tim Blackwell	63	122	20	.164	0	12
Ken Henderson	62	81	19	.235	2	8
Steve Macko	19	40	9	.225	0	3
Miguel Diloné	43	36	11	.306	0	1
Sam Mejías	31	11	2	.182	0	0
Bruce Kimm	9	11	1	.091	0	0
Gene Clines	10	10	2	.200	0	0
Steve Davis	3	4	0	.000	0	1
Kurt Seibert	7	2	0	.000	0	0
Karl Pagel	1	1	0	.000	0	0

=== Pitching ===
==== Starting pitchers ====
Note: G = Games pitched; IP = Innings pitched; W = Wins; L = Losses; ERA = Earned run average; SO = Strikeouts

Player	G	IP	W	L	ERA	SO
Rick Reuschel	36	239.0	18	12	3.62	125
Lynn McGlothen	42	212.0	13	14	4.12	147
Dennis Lamp	38	200.1	11	10	3.50	86
Mike Krukow	28	164.2	9	9	4.21	119
Ken Holtzman	23	117.2	6	9	4.59	44

==== Other pitchers ====
Note: G = Games pitched; IP = Innings pitched; W = Wins; L = Losses; ERA = Earned run average; SO = Strikeouts

Player	G	IP	W	L	ERA	SO
Bill Caudill	29	90.0	1	7	4.80	104
George Riley	4	13.0	0	1	5.54	5

==== Relief pitchers ====
Note: G = Games pitched; W = Wins; L = Losses; SV = Saves; ERA = Earned run average; SO = Strikeouts

Player	G	W	L	SV	ERA	SO
Bruce Sutter	62	6	6	37	2.22	110
Dick Tidrow	63	11	5	4	2.72	68
Willie Hernández	51	4	4	0	5.01	53
Donnie Moore	39	1	4	1	5.18	43
Ray Burris	14	0	0	0	6.23	14
Doug Capilla	13	0	1	0	2.60	10
Dave Geisel	7	0	0	0	0.60	5

== Farm system ==
Level	Team	League	Manager
AAA	Wichita Aeros	American Association	Jack Hiatt
AA	Midland Cubs	Texas League	Randy Hundley
A	Quad Cities Cubs	Midwest League	Jim Napier
A-Short Season	Geneva Cubs	New York–Penn League	Bob Hartsfield
Rookie	GCL Cubs	Gulf Coast League	Ken Rudolph

LEAGUE CHAMPIONS: Quad Cities
