= John Curtis (baseball) =

American baseball player (born 1948)

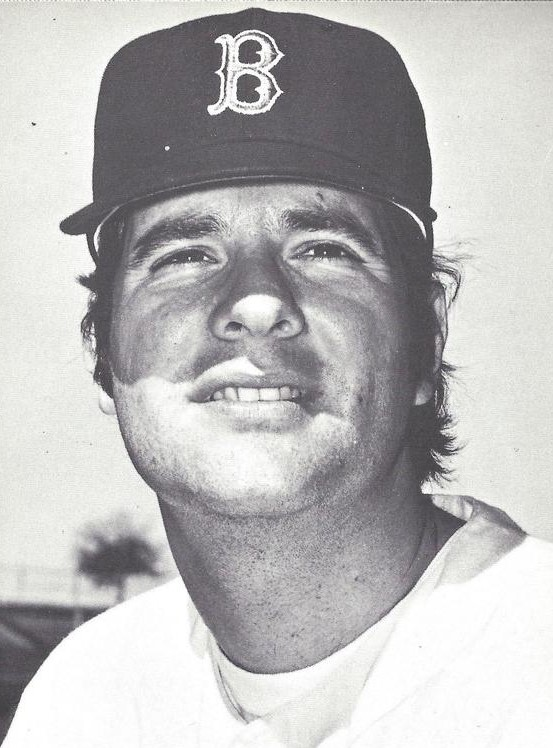
- Pitcher
- Born: March 9, 1948 (age 78); Newton, Massachusetts, U.S.
- Batted: Left Threw: Left

MLB debut
- August 13, 1970, for the Boston Red Sox

Last MLB appearance
- September 28, 1984, for the California Angels

MLB statistics
- Win–loss record: 89–97
- Earned run average: 3.96
- Strikeouts: 825
- Stats at Baseball Reference

Teams
- Boston Red Sox (1970–1973); St. Louis Cardinals (1974–1976); San Francisco Giants (1977–1979); San Diego Padres (1980–1982); California Angels (1982–1984)
Medals
Men's baseball
Representing United States
Pan American Games
Gold medal – first place	1967 Winnipeg	Team

John Duffield Curtis (born March 9, 1948) is an American former professional baseball pitcher. Twice a first-round draft pick, Curtis played baseball at Clemson University and then pitched for several Major League Baseball (MLB) teams between 1970 and 1984. He retired with an 89–97 win–loss record and a 3.96 earned run average (ERA).

== Early life ==
Curtis attended Smithtown High School in Smithtown, New York. He was drafted by the Cleveland Indians in the first round of the 1966 Major League Baseball draft but did not sign, choosing instead to attend Clemson University. In 1967, he played collegiate summer baseball with the Chatham A's of the Cape Cod Baseball League.

== Career ==
=== Boston Red Sox ===
After two seasons at Clemson, he was drafted by the Boston Red Sox in the first round of the secondary phase of the 1968 Major League Baseball draft, and signed with the club.

Curtis was called to the majors during his third minor league season, and made his major league debut as a reliever on August 13, 1970 against the Kansas City Royals. After getting through his first two innings with just one hit and one walk, he loaded the bases, and gave up a grand slam to Ed Kirkpatrick in his third inning of work. He did not pitch in the majors again for over a year.

When he returned to the BoSox in September 1971, he was used as a starter by manager Eddie Kasko. After losing his first two starts against the New York Yankees and Detroit Tigers, he got his first major league win out of the bullpen against the Cleveland Indians. He then pitched a complete game victory over the Washington Senators in his final game of the season.

Curtis began the 1972 season with the triple A Louisville Colonels, but he was back with the Red Sox by the end of May. He was traded after the 1973 season with Mike Garman and Lynn McGlothen to the St. Louis Cardinals for Reggie Cleveland, Terry Hughes and Diego Seguí.

With the new designated hitter rule to go into effect the following season, Curtis became the last pitcher to ever bat at Fenway Park on September 28, 1972, in the bottom of the seventh inning in a 3-1 Red Sox win against the Kansas City Royals.

=== St. Louis Cardinals ===
The Cards were battling the Pittsburgh Pirates for first place in the National League East all season when the Bucs came to Busch Stadium for a three-game set September 23–25, 1974. The Pirates took two of the three with Curtis taking the loss in the second game. Curtis spent three seasons in St. Louis, going 24–34 with a 3.88 earned run average and 208 strikeouts, mostly as a starter.

=== San Francisco Giants ===
After the 1976 season, he was traded to the San Francisco Giants with Willie Crawford and Vic Harris for Mike Caldwell, John D'Acquisto and Dave Rader. Curtis became predominantly a reliever for the first time in his career while with the Giants. He went 17–15 with a 4.45 ERA over three seasons with the Giants, appearing in 116 games.

Curtis played for the San Francisco Giants from 1977 to 1979. In his first start for the Giants on May 8, 1977, Curtis pitched a two-hit 10–0 shutout versus the Mets and hit for two singles and a triple. While playing for the Giants, Curtis lived in Foster City, California.

=== San Diego Padres ===
He was converted back to a starter when he signed with the San Diego Padres as a free agent for the 1980 season, and emerged as the ace of the staff by the end of the season, going 10–8 with a 3.51 ERA for the last-place team. He began the strike-shortened 1981 season as a starter, but after going 0–2 with a 6.30 ERA in that role, he was converted to a reliever, and pitched exclusively in that role during the second half of the season when play resumed.

=== California Angels ===
Curtis' contract was purchased by the California Angels on August 31, 1982, during their playoff drive. Though he joined his new club in time to be on the postseason roster, he did not see any playing time during the 1982 American League Championship Series. He remained with the Angels through 1984, then retired.

== Personal life ==
Curtis lives in Long Beach, California, with his wife, Mary Ann. Upon retiring, Curtis began freelance writing articles for the San Diego Union-Tribune, Boston Globe, San Francisco Chronicle and Sports Illustrated. After a nearly twenty-year absence from the game, he returned to coach the Long Beach Breakers during the two-year run of the independent Western Baseball League (2001 and 2002).

Curtis was inducted into the Suffolk Sports Hall of Fame on Long Island in the Baseball Category with the Class of 1992.

=== Career statistics ===
W	L	PCT	ERA	G	GS	CG	SHO	SV	IP	BF	H	ER	R	HR	BB	K	WP	HBP
89	97	.478	3.96	438	199	42	14	11	1641	7099	1695	722	810	140	669	825	74	13
