= 1977 Cincinnati Reds season =

1977 Cincinnati Reds
- League: National League
- Division: West
- Ballpark: Riverfront Stadium
- City: Cincinnati
- Record: 88–74 (.543)
- Divisional place: 2nd
- Owners: Louis Nippert
- General managers: Bob Howsam
- Managers: Sparky Anderson
- Television: WLWT (Ken Coleman, Bill Brown)
- Radio: WLW (Marty Brennaman, Joe Nuxhall)

The 1977 Cincinnati Reds season was the 108th season for the franchise in Major League Baseball, and their 8th and 7th full season at Riverfront Stadium. The team entered 1977 as the two-time defending World Series champions, but finished in second place in the National League West, with a record of 88–74, 10 games behind the Los Angeles Dodgers and missed the playoffs. The Reds were managed by Sparky Anderson and played their home games at Riverfront Stadium.

== Offseason ==
- December 16, 1976: Tony Pérez and Will McEnaney were traded by the Reds to the Montreal Expos for Woodie Fryman and Dale Murray.
- February 13, 1977: Steve Christmas was signed as an amateur free agent by the Reds.
- February 16, 1977: Dave Schneck was traded by the Reds to the Chicago Cubs for Champ Summers.
- March 28, 1977: Joel Youngblood was traded by the Reds to the St. Louis Cardinals for Bill Caudill.

== Regular season ==
=== Season standings ===
NL West
Team	W	L	Pct.	GB	Home	Road
Los Angeles Dodgers	98	64	.605	—	51‍–‍30	47‍–‍34
Cincinnati Reds	88	74	.543	10	48‍–‍33	40‍–‍41
Houston Astros	81	81	.500	17	46‍–‍35	35‍–‍46
San Francisco Giants	75	87	.463	23	38‍–‍43	37‍–‍44
San Diego Padres	69	93	.426	29	35‍–‍46	34‍–‍47
Atlanta Braves	61	101	.377	37	40‍–‍41	21‍–‍60

=== Record vs. opponents ===
1977 National League record Sources:
Team	ATL	CHC	CIN	HOU	LAD	MON	NYM	PHI	PIT	SD	SF	STL
Atlanta	—	5–7	4–14	9–9	5–13	6–6	7–5	2–10	3–9	11–7	8–10	1–11
Chicago	7–5	—	7–5	6–6	6–6	10–8	9–9	6–12	7–11	7–5	9–3	7–11
Cincinnati	14–4	5–7	—	5–13	10–8	7–5	10–2	8–4	3–9	11–7	10–8	5–7
Houston	9–9	6–6	13–5	—	9–9	8–4	6–6	4–8	4–8	8–10	9–9	5–7
Los Angeles	13–5	6–6	8–10	9–9	—	7–5	8–4	6–6	9–3	12–6	14–4	6–6
Montreal	6–6	8–10	5–7	4–8	5–7	—	10–8	7–11	7–11	5–7	6–6	12–6
New York	5–7	9–9	2–10	6–6	4–8	8–10	—	5–13	4–14	6–6	7–5	8–10
Philadelphia	10-2	12–6	4–8	8–4	6–6	11–7	13–5	—	8–10	9–3	9–3	11–7
Pittsburgh	9–3	11–7	9–3	8–4	3–9	11–7	14–4	10–8	—	10–2	2–10	9–9
San Diego	7–11	5–7	7–11	10–8	6–12	7–5	6–6	3–9	2–10	—	8–10	8–4
San Francisco	10–8	3–9	8–10	9–9	4–14	6–6	5–7	3–9	10–2	10–8	—	7–5
St. Louis	11–1	11–7	7–5	7–5	6–6	6–12	10–8	7–11	9–9	4–8	5–7	—

=== Notable transactions ===
- June 15, 1977: Pat Zachry, Doug Flynn, Steve Henderson, and Dan Norman were traded by the Reds to the New York Mets for Tom Seaver.
- June 15, 1977: Gary Nolan was traded by the Reds to the California Angels for Craig Hendrickson (minors).
- June 15, 1977: Rawly Eastwick was traded by the Reds to the St. Louis Cardinals for Doug Capilla.
- June 15, 1977: Mike Caldwell was traded by the Reds to the Milwaukee Brewers for two minor leaguers.
- September 28, 1977: Rudy Meoli was purchased from the Reds by the Chicago Cubs.

=== Roster ===
1977 Cincinnati Reds
Roster
Pitchers: 42 Santo Alcalá; 43 Jack Billingham; 34 Pedro Borbón; 44 Mike Caldwell; 44 Doug Capilla; 50 Dan Dumoulin; 49 Rawly Eastwick; 35 Woodie Fryman; 53 Joe Henderson; 40 Joe Hoerner; 47 Tom Hume; 31 Paul Moskau; 37 Dale Murray; 38 Gary Nolan; 32 Fred Norman; 45 Manny Sarmiento; 41 Tom Seaver; 36 Mario Soto; 38 Ángel Torres; 40 Pat Zachry	Catchers: 5 Johnny Bench; 9 Bill Plummer; 7 Don Werner; Infielders: 23 Rick Auerbach; 11 Bob Bailey; 13 Dave Concepción; 22 Dan Driessen; 23 Doug Flynn; 25 Ray Knight; 8 Joe Morgan; 14 Pete Rose	Outfielders: 33 Ed Armbrister; 15 George Foster; 20 César Gerónimo; 30 Ken Griffey; 21 Mike Lum; 28 Champ Summers	Manager: 10 Sparky Anderson; Coaches: 18 Ted Kluszewski; 2 Russ Nixon; 3 George Scherger; 4 Larry Shepard

== Player stats ==
= Indicates team leader

= Indicates league leader

=== Batting ===
==== Starters by position ====
Note: Pos = Position; G = Games played; AB = At bats; H = Hits; Avg. = Batting average; HR = Home runs; RBI = Runs batted in

Pos	Player	G	AB	H	Avg.	HR	RBI
C	Johnny Bench	142	494	136	.275	31	109
1B	Dan Driessen	151	536	161	.300	17	91
2B	Joe Morgan	153	521	150	.288	22	78
SS	Dave Concepcion	156	572	155	.271	8	64
3B	Pete Rose	162	655	204	.311	9	64
LF	George Foster	158	615	197	.320	52	149
CF	Cesar Geronimo	149	492	131	.266	10	52
RF	Ken Griffey Sr.	154	585	186	.318	12	57

==== Other batters ====
Note: G = Games played; AB = At bats; H = Hits; Avg. = Batting average; HR = Home runs; RBI = Runs batted in

Player	G	AB	H	Avg.	HR	RBI
Mike Lum	81	125	20	.160	5	16
Bill Plummer	51	117	16	.137	1	7
Ray Knight	80	92	24	.261	1	13
Bob Bailey	49	79	20	.253	2	11
Ed Armbrister	65	78	20	.256	1	5
Champ Summers	59	76	13	.171	3	6
Rick Auerbach	33	45	7	.156	0	3
Doug Flynn	36	32	8	.250	0	5
Don Werner	10	23	4	.174	2	4

=== Pitching ===
==== Starting pitchers ====
Note: G = Games pitched; IP = Innings pitched; W = Wins; L = Losses; ERA = Earned run average; SO = Strikeouts

Player	G	IP	W	L	ERA	SO
Fred Norman	35	221.1	14	13	3.38	160
Tom Seaver	20	165.1	14	3	2.34	124
Jack Billingham	36	161.2	10	10	5.23	76
Paul Moskau	20	108.0	6	6	4.00	71
Doug Capilla	22	106.1	7	8	4.23	74
Woodie Fryman	17	75.1	5	5	5.38	57
Pat Zachry	12	75.0	3	7	5.04	36
Mario Soto	12	60.2	2	6	5.34	44
Gary Nolan	8	39.1	4	1	4.81	28

==== Other pitchers ====
Note: G = Games pitched; IP = Innings pitched; W = Wins; L = Losses; ERA = Earned run average; SO = Strikeouts

Player	G	IP	W	L	ERA	SO
Tom Hume	14	43.0	3	3	7.12	22
Santo Alcalá	7	15.2	1	1	5.74	9

==== Relief pitchers ====
Note: G = Games pitched; W = Wins; L = Losses; SV = Saves; ERA = Earned run average; SO = Strikeouts

Player	G	W	L	SV	ERA	SO
Pedro Borbon	73	10	5	18	3.19	48
Dale Murray	61	7	2	4	4.94	42
Manny Sarmiento	24	0	0	1	2.45	23
Rawly Eastwick	23	2	2	7	2.91	17
Mike Caldwell	14	0	0	1	4.01	11
Joe Hoerner	8	0	0	0	12.71	5
Joe Henderson	7	0	2	0	12.00	8
Ángel Torres	5	0	0	0	2.16	8
Dan Dumoulin	5	0	0	0	13.50	5

== Awards and records ==
- George Foster, MLB Home Run Champion (52)
- George Foster, MLB RBI Champion (149)
- George Foster, National League MVP

=== All-Stars ===
1977 Major League Baseball All-Star Game

- Johnny Bench, starter, catcher
- Joe Morgan, starter, second base
- Dave Concepción, starter, shortstop
- George Foster, starter, outfield
- Tom Seaver, reserve
- Pete Rose, reserve
- Ken Griffey, reserve

== Farm system ==
Level	Team	League	Manager
AAA	Indianapolis Indians	American Association	Roy Majtyka
AA	Trois-Rivières Aigles	Eastern League	Chuck Goggin
A	Tampa Tarpons	Florida State League	Jim Hoff
A	Shelby Reds	Western Carolinas League	Jim Lett
A-Short Season	Eugene Emeralds	Northwest League	John Underwood
Rookie	Billings Mustangs	Pioneer League	Greg Riddoch
