= Cacek =

Cacek is a surname. Notable people with the surname include:

- Craig Cacek (born 1954), American baseball player
- P. D. Cacek (born 1951), American author
