= Rawly Eastwick =

American baseball player (born 1950)

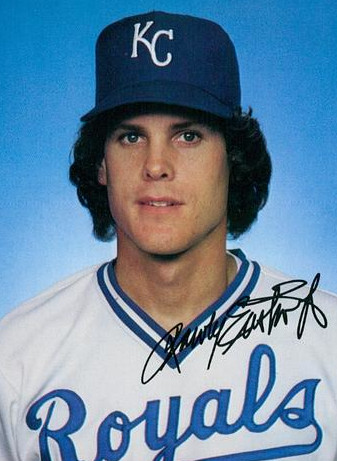
- Eastwick in 1980
- Pitcher
- Born: October 24, 1950 (age 75); Camden, New Jersey, U.S.
- Batted: Right Threw: Right

MLB debut
- September 12, 1974, for the Cincinnati Reds

Last MLB appearance
- October 1, 1981, for the Chicago Cubs

MLB statistics
- Win–loss record: 28–27
- Earned run average: 3.31
- Strikeouts: 295
- Saves: 68
- Stats at Baseball Reference

Teams
- Cincinnati Reds (1974–1977); St. Louis Cardinals (1977); New York Yankees (1978); Philadelphia Phillies (1978–1979); Kansas City Royals (1980); Chicago Cubs (1981)

Career highlights and awards
- 2× World Series champion (1975, 1976); NL Rolaids Relief Man Award (1976); 2× NL saves leader (1975, 1976)

Rawlins Jackson Eastwick (born October 24, 1950) is an American former professional baseball relief pitcher, who played in Major League Baseball (MLB) for the Cincinnati Reds, St. Louis Cardinals, New York Yankees, Philadelphia Phillies, Kansas City Royals, and Chicago Cubs, from 1975 to 1981.

== Career ==
Born in Camden, New Jersey, Eastwick grew up in Haddenfield and attended Haddonfield Memorial High School. He was selected by the Cincinnati Reds in the third round of the 1969 amateur draft. In 1973, he made it to the Indianapolis Indians of the American Association and made his major league debut in September 1974 with the Reds. He started back at Indianapolis in 1975 but pitched well and was called up for good. In his rookie season, he tied for the National League lead in saves with 22.

In the 1975 World Series against the Boston Red Sox, Eastwick won Games 2 and 3 and also earned a save in Game 5 as the Reds won the series in seven. In Game 6, he gave up a three-run home run to ex-Red Bernie Carbo that tied the game, which the Red Sox won in twelve innings. In 1976, Eastwick had his best season, going 11–5 in relief with a 2.06 earned run average. He also led the league in saves and won the NL Fireman of the Year award. The Reds won their second consecutive World Series title, sweeping the New York Yankees in four games.

Eastwick was dealt to the Cardinals for Doug Capilla at the trade deadline on June 15, 1977, as a result of a contract dispute with Reds management. His desire to become a free agent by not signing a contract with any team for the remainder of the season precluded him from being sent to the New York Mets in the Tom Seaver trade. Eastwick signed a five-year, $1.2 million deal with the Yankees at the Winter Meetings on December 9, 1977. He joined a bullpen which already had Sparky Lyle, Dick Tidrow, and Goose Gossage, the last of whom had signed for $2.7 million two weeks earlier. Eastwick's time with the Yankees lasted until the day before the trade deadline on June 14, 1978, when he was sent to the Philadelphia Phillies for Jay Johnstone and Bobby Brown. He spent two seasons with the Phillies, posting a 4.90 ERA in 1979 and was released. Eastwick then pitched for the Kansas City Royals in 1980 and the Chicago Cubs in 1981 before retiring.

== See also ==
- List of Major League Baseball annual saves leaders
