= Pete Broberg =

American baseball player (born 1950)

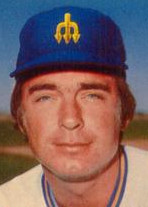
- Pitcher
- Born: March 2, 1950 (age 76); West Palm Beach, Florida, U.S.
- Batted: Right Threw: Right

MLB debut
- June 20, 1971, for the Washington Senators

Last MLB appearance
- October 1, 1978, for the Oakland Athletics

MLB statistics
- Win–loss record: 41–71
- Earned run average: 4.56
- Strikeouts: 536
- Stats at Baseball Reference

Teams
- Washington Senators / Texas Rangers (1971–1974); Milwaukee Brewers (1975–1976); Chicago Cubs (1977); Oakland Athletics (1978)

Peter Sven Broberg (born March 2, 1950) is an American former Major League Baseball pitcher.

== Career ==
Broberg played in the major leagues from 1971 to 1978. He played for the Washington Senators/Texas Rangers, Milwaukee Brewers, Chicago Cubs, and Oakland Athletics. He was drafted from Dartmouth College in 1971, and went straight to the Major Leagues. He was the fifth player to go straight to the Major Leagues after being drafted without spending a day in the minors. He was traded from the Rangers to the Brewers for Clyde Wright at the Winter Meetings on December 5, 1974. Broberg was acquired by the expansion Seattle Mariners prior to the 1977 season and traded to the Chicago Cubs for a player to be named later (Jim Todd).

== Personal life ==
Pete Broberg's father was Gus Broberg, a three-time All-American basketball standout for Dartmouth College from 1938 to 1941. Pete is a 1972 graduate of Dartmouth.

== See also ==
- List of baseball players who went directly to Major League Baseball
