= 1977 Houston Astros season =

16th season in Major League Baseball for the Houston Astros

1977 Houston Astros
- League: National League
- Division: West
- Ballpark: Astrodome
- City: Houston, Texas
- Record: 81–81 (.500)
- Divisional place: 3rd
- Owners: General Electric, Ford Motor Company
- General managers: Tal Smith
- Managers: Bill Virdon
- Television: KPRC-TV
- Radio: KPRC (AM) (Gene Elston, Dewayne Staats)

The 1977 Houston Astros season was the 16th season for the Major League Baseball (MLB) franchise located in Houston, Texas, their 13th as the Astros, 16th in the National League (NL), ninth in the NL West division, and 13th at The Astrodome. The Astros entered the season having completed an 80–82 record, in third place and 22 games behind the two-time defending division-champion and World Series-winning Cincinnati Reds.

On April 8, J. R. Richard made his second Opening Day start for Houston, who hosted the Atlanta Braves and won, 3–2. The Astros' first round selection in the amateur draft was shortstop Ricky Adams at 14th overall.

On June 24, Bob Watson became the second player in franchise history to hit for the cycle, and the first in major league history to do so in both the NL and the American League (AL). It was the third cycle overall for the Astros, and third in six seasons.

Pitcher Joaquín Andújar was selected to represent the Astros at the MLB All-Star Game for the first time in his career. Later in the season, César Cedeño became the sixth major leaguer since 1900 to record six campaigns with 50 or more stolen bases.

With a one-game improvement from the prior season to 81–81, Houston maintained third place in the NL West, 17 games behind the division champion and NL pennant-winning Los Angeles Dodgers. The Astros' fourth season over the past six with a record of .500 or above, it was also the first time they finished in third place or higher in consecutive seasons.

== Offseason ==
The Houston Astros concluded their 1976 season with an 80–82 (.494) record, in third place in the National League (NL) West division, and 22 games behind the back-to-back division- and eventual World Series-champion Cincinnati Reds. It was Houston's seventh campaign within the prior eight to have won at least 79 games. During the first full season with Bill Virdon as manager, he guided Houston to a 15 1/2-game rebound from the 1975 campaign.

- December 8, 1976: Greg Gross was traded by the Astros to the Chicago Cubs for Julio González.
- January 11, 1977: John Butcher was drafted by the Astros in the 1st round (5th pick) of the secondary phase of the 1977 Major League Baseball draft, but did not sign.
- January 25, 1977: Paul Siebert was traded by the Astros to the San Diego Padres for Mike Allen (minors).
- March 26, 1977: Rob Andrews and cash were traded by the Astros to the San Francisco Giants for Willie Crawford and Rob Sperring.

== Regular season ==
=== Summary ===
==== April ====
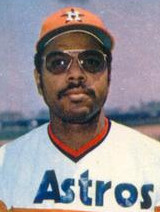
Bob Watson, c. 1977, hit for the cycle and established a then-club record for RBI.

Opening Day starting lineup
Uniform	Player	Position
9	Julio González	Second baseman
23	Enos Cabell	Third baseman
25	José Cruz	Right fielder
27	Bob Watson	First baseman
21	Willie Crawford	Left fielder
13	Joe Ferguson	Catcher
24	Art Gardner	Center fielder
14	Roger Metzger	Shortstop
50	J. R. Richard	Pitcher
Venue: Astrodome • Final: Houston 3, Atlanta 2 Sources:

On April 8, J. R. Richard made his second Opening Day start for Houston, who hosted the Atlanta Braves. Atlanta bolted a 2–0 lead in the top of the first when Jeff Burroughs clobbered a two-run home run deep to left off Richard. During the bottom of the first, José Cruz punched a sacrifice fly that plated Julio González. Braves Opening Day starter Andy Messersmith equally matched his counterpart, as both he and Richard tossed nine innings of two-run ball. Leading of the top of the 11th opposing Bob Johnson, Astros catcher Joe Ferguson golfed a walk-off home run to win the contest for the Astros, 3–2. Ken Forsch tossed two shutout frames to earn the victory. Ferguson's home run was the second of his career, on both an Opening Day (first was on April 6, 1973), and walk-off (June 22, 1974). This victory was the fifth of a five-Opening Day winning streak, one that remained a club record until 2018.

On April 24, Bob Watson's bases-loaded tiple broke a 2–2 tie in the bottom of the sixth inning versus the San Diego Padres, oof Rick Sawyer. This was one key hit in a see-saw games versus the San Diego, which Houston won via Rob Sperring's walk-off hit off Rollie Fingers, scoring Watson for a 9–8 final.

==== May ====
Second baseman Art Howe connected for two home runs on May 25 to lead a 7–6 decision over the Los Angeles Dodgers. Teammate Julio González factored greatly into the win by collecting four hits.

==== Bob Watson's cycle ====
On June 24, Bob Watson tripled, doubled, and hit a home run against the San Francisco Giants. In the eighth inning, he singled to hit for the cycle, and became the second player in franchise history to do so. Part of a five-RBI performance, this led the Astros to a 6–5 win. Watson became the first in major league to hit for the cycle so in both the NL and the American League (AL). (Note: Watson hit his cycle as an American League player two years later, on September 15, 1979, after the Astros had traded him to the Boston Red Sox.)

In the bottom of the first inning, Watson swatted a bases-loaded triple which broke a scoreless tie to give the Astros a 3–0. Having already hit a bases loaded triple two months earlier, Watson became the first player in club history to hit two bases-loaded triples during the same season. Watson connected for the triple off future Astro Bob Knepper. Bill Madlock and Darrell Evans each connected for home runs off the Astros' Dan Larson. During the bottom of the 11th inning, José Cruz doubled home Wilbur Howard for the game-winner and walk-off hit.

Watson's cycle took place the season after teammate César Cedeño hit for his second, who also hit the first two cycles in club history. The next cycle by an Astros player was by Andújar Cedeño on August 25, 1992.

==== July ====
Right-hander Joaquín Andújar was invited to represent Houston on the National League squad at the MLB All-Star Game for the first time in his career, hosted at Yankee Stadium II. Andújar did not pitch in the Midsummer Classic. Former Astro Joe Morgan led off the contest homering from a Jim Palmer offering as the National League took a 4–0 lead in the top of the first. Greg Luzinski also homered in the frame. The National League maintained the lead and won, 7–5.

==== August—September ====
On August 15, Art Howe hit his first career grand slam and 10th home run of the season, versus Buzz Capra, capping a 15–3 thrashing of the Atlanta Braves. Bob Watson doubled (29) and reached base four times. Terry Puhl tripled (1), walked thrice, and scored four runs. J. R. Richard also homered (2) and earned the victory (12–9), tossing one-hit ball with four walks over five innings. Rob Sperring had the only four-hit game of his career, and homered and drove in two runs.

Starting August 25, César Cedeño authored a 22-game hitting streak to establish a new club mark while breaking the record of 21 games set by Lee May on June 21, 1973. Cedeño's performance included contrasting phases of productivity, with one hit each over the first nine games for a .257 batting average (9-for-35). However, in the following nine games, Cedeño exploded, going 22-for-41 (.537 average), nine extra-base hits, for a 1.024 slugging percentage.

Overall, Cedeño hit .398 (37-for-98) during the hitting streak, while his baserunning accelerated to a fervent pace with 21 stolen bases. The 22-game hitting streak represented the longest of Cedeño's career. The year before, from April 17–May 14, 1976, Cedeño had also put together a 19-game hitting streak. Thus, he became the first individual in Astros history to collect two or more hitting streaks of 19 games or more. Cedeño's record stood until teammate Art Howe hit in 23 straight from May 1 to 24, 1981.

On September 4, Bob Watson connected for his fifth career grand slam. Watson also doubled and had five RBI to lead a 7–1 win over the Montreal Expos. Joe Niekro (11–5) cruised to a complete game, scattered five hits, and at the plate, collected two hits and an RBI. Watson ranked second in club history at the time to Bob Aspromonte, who had six between 1963 and 1966; they had been the only Colt .45s/Astros players to hit as many as four.

César Cedeño was recognized as National League (NL) Player of the Week for September 11. (Note: Co-winner with Willie McCovey of the San Francisco Giants.) The Astros won five of seven games, during which, Cedeño hit .400 (12-for30), .733 slugging percentage, six runs scored, three doubles, two triples, one home run, and seven RBI.

On September 12 and 13, Cedeño collected back-to-back four-hit games against the Cincinnati Reds, hitting two three home runs, two triples, and five runs batted in (RBI). He became the fourth player in team history to record four hits each over consecutive games, succeeding Wilbur Howard on August 23 and 24, 1975. (Note: Next accomplished for Houston by Jeff Bagwell on July 14 and 15, 1995. Criteria: Longest streak of consecutive games, playing for HOU, in the regular season, requiring Hits ≥ 4, sorted by most games matching criteria.)

The following week ended September 18, over six games, Cedeño netted a .500 batting average (14-for-28), nine runs scored, one double, two triples, three home runs, and six RBI.

==== October ====
On the final day of the regular season, October 2, Los Angeles took Astros starter J. R. Richard deep three times at Dodger Stadium, the first time in 147 games and 130 starts for the hard-throwing, 6 feet 8 inches (2.03 m) right-handed Louisiana native.

In fact, like a lightning strike, all 3 Dodger blasts arrived in the sixth inning via offerings to Manny Mota, Dusty Baker, and Glenn Burke. Baker's and Burke's bombs were consecutive. At the time, this gave Los Angeles a 3–1 advantage.

The Dodgers' home runs carried extra significance, in that, Mota, who was pinch hitting, hit the final of his major league career. Burke's was one of his two major league home runs. Baker, meanwhile, mashed his 30th jack for the first time. For Los Angeles baseball, this was a club-record 15th consecutive game heralding the long ball, and their fourth hitter with at least 30 home runs, the first time this was accomplished by any major league team. As Baker reached home plate following the blast, Burke greeted him his hand held high, who instinctively raised his hand to hit Burke's palm, creating the high five, speculated to have been the moment it was invented. (Note: For the final stint of his managerial career, Baker was appointed to the position for the Astros in 2020.)

However, the Astros lineup did not allow Richard to forget their own power capabilities. Watson commenced the scoring in the first with a single to score Cedeño, then, in fourth, hit his 22nd dinger of the season. The inning after the Dodgers' three home runs, Cedeño singled in José Cruz. With the bases full—including Enos Cabell, Cedeño, and Watson—Denny Walling then tripled to drove home everyone. This raised the score went 6–3 Houston, which is how it remained. Cedeño and Cabell also doubled. Each of the top four of Houston order had multi-hit efforts (Cruz 2, Cabell 2, Cedeñp 3 and Watson 2). The win got Houston to the .500 mark (81–81).

Richard whiffed 14 Dodgers, a season-high. This was Richard's second-highest total for one game, following his major league debut with 15 punchouts on September 5, 1971. Richard also notched his 13th complete game, and earned his 18th win of the season to follow-up his first 20-win season the year prior.

César Cedeño was recognized with NL Player of the Month honors for September–October. Over 28 games, he batted .417 (50-for-120) / .425 on-base percentage / .692 slugging percentage / 1.117 on-base plus slugging (OPS), 28 runs scored, 83 total bases, 10 doubles, and 16 stolen bases. Moreover, Cedeño set a club record by becoming the first batter to attain 50 hits in a single month, which surpassed the effort of 49 by Rusty Staub in July 1967. (Note: In September 2000, Richard Hidalgo broke this record with 51 hits. Criteria: In the Regular Season, from 1898 to 2026, playing for HOU, For any choice in Months, requiring Hits ≥ 45, sorted by lowest Year.)

Meanwhile, during the month of September—October, Bob Watson became the first Astros player to collect 30 or more RBI during any calendar month, passing the club record of 29 by Jimmy Wynn in June, 1967. (Note: Remained the club record until Jeff Bagwell and Derek Bell each registered 31 RBI in July 1995. Criteria: In the regular season, from 1898 to 2026, playing for HOU, for any choice in months, requiring runs batted in ≥ 28, sorted by greatest runs batted in.)

==== Performance overview ====
The Astros concluded the 1977 season with a performance of 81–81 (.500), in third place in the NL West, and trailing division champion and NL pennant-winning Los Angeles Dodgers by 17 games. The club maintained third place with one-game improvement from the year before. The Astros' fifth season with a record of .500 or above—all since 1969—it their third campaign concluded in third place, at the time matching their best for any season. They would finish higher than third for the first time in 1979.

Six Astros hitters reached double-figures in home runs to establish a club record, formerly five in 1969 and replicated in four the next five campaigns. (Note: This record of six hitters was matched by the 1987 teams, and surpassed in 1993. Criteria: Number of players that meet criteria in a season, up to 2001, playing for HOU, in the regular season, requiring home runs ≥ 10, sorted by descending instances.) Houston led the National League in triples in 1977 while ranking second to the Pittsburgh Pirates with 187 stolen bases. Three Astros reached the 40-stolen base plateau, including César Cedeño (61), José Cruz (44), and Enos Cabell (42). Cedeño's total set a new club single-season, exceeding his own mark set just the year before (58), while extending another club-record sixth of six uninterrupted campaigns with at least 50 steals. (Note: In 1988, Gerald Young overtook Cedeño's single-season stolen base record with 65.) This was the first time in club history that the Astros had rostered as many as three 40-stolen base bandits, and the ninth of a franchise-record nine consecutive featuring at least one player with that coup. (Note: For single seasons, playing for HOU, in the regular season, requiring stolen bases ≥ 40, sorted by ascending season.)

Moreover, Cedeño became the second major leaguer during the modern era (since 1900) to record six consecutive seasons with 50 or more stolen bases, following Lou Brock (12 consecutive from 1965 to 1976). Cedeño also became the sixth player to garner 50 stolen bases over any span of six campaigns since 1900, following Bert Campaneris as also having been the most recent prior to Cedeño (seven between the 1965 to 1976 seasons). (Note: Since surpassed by Rickey Henderson, Tim Raines, and Vince Coleman. Criteria: Number of seasons player meets criteria, since 1900, in the regular season, requiring stolen bases ≥ 50, sorted by descending instances.)

In addition to setting the record for RBI over a calendar month, Watson also set a new club record over a full saason with 110 RBI, surpassing Jimmy Wynn's achievement set in 1967 (107). (Note: Watson's record stood until Jeff Bagwell collected 116 RBI in 1994.) Watson cranked his fifth career grand slam on September 4, 1977, second in Colt .45s/Astros history to Bob Aspromonte (six).

Richard garnered 214 strikeouts for the second consecutive season, at the time, matching his career-high set just the year prior. He also became Houston's first multiple-season 200-strikeout moundsman. (Note: For single seasons, playing for HOU, in the regular season, requiring strikeouts ≥ 200, sorted by ascending season.)

=== League standings ===
==== National League West ====
NL West
Team	W	L	Pct.	GB	Home	Road
Los Angeles Dodgers	98	64	.605	—	51‍–‍30	47‍–‍34
Cincinnati Reds	88	74	.543	10	48‍–‍33	40‍–‍41
Houston Astros	81	81	.500	17	46‍–‍35	35‍–‍46
San Francisco Giants	75	87	.463	23	38‍–‍43	37‍–‍44
San Diego Padres	69	93	.426	29	35‍–‍46	34‍–‍47
Atlanta Braves	61	101	.377	37	40‍–‍41	21‍–‍60

==== Record versus opponents ====
National League

1977 National League record Sources:
Team	ATL	CHC	CIN	HOU	LAD	MON	NYM	PHI	PIT	SD	SF	STL
Atlanta	—	5–7	4–14	9–9	5–13	6–6	7–5	2–10	3–9	11–7	8–10	1–11
Chicago	7–5	—	7–5	6–6	6–6	10–8	9–9	6–12	7–11	7–5	9–3	7–11
Cincinnati	14–4	5–7	—	5–13	10–8	7–5	10–2	8–4	3–9	11–7	10–8	5–7
Houston	9–9	6–6	13–5	—	9–9	8–4	6–6	4–8	4–8	8–10	9–9	5–7
Los Angeles	13–5	6–6	8–10	9–9	—	7–5	8–4	6–6	9–3	12–6	14–4	6–6
Montreal	6–6	8–10	5–7	4–8	5–7	—	10–8	7–11	7–11	5–7	6–6	12–6
New York	5–7	9–9	2–10	6–6	4–8	8–10	—	5–13	4–14	6–6	7–5	8–10
Philadelphia	10-2	12–6	4–8	8–4	6–6	11–7	13–5	—	8–10	9–3	9–3	11–7
Pittsburgh	9–3	11–7	9–3	8–4	3–9	11–7	14–4	10–8	—	10–2	2–10	9–9
San Diego	7–11	5–7	7–11	10–8	6–12	7–5	6–6	3–9	2–10	—	8–10	8–4
San Francisco	10–8	3–9	8–10	9–9	4–14	6–6	5–7	3–9	10–2	10–8	—	7–5
St. Louis	11–1	11–7	7–5	7–5	6–6	6–12	10–8	7–11	9–9	4–8	5–7	—

=== Notable transactions ===
- June 7, 1977: Scott Loucks was drafted by the Astros in the 5th round of the 1977 Major League Baseball draft.
- June 15, 1977: Willie Crawford was traded by the Astros to the Oakland Athletics for Denny Walling.

=== Roster ===
1977 Houston Astros
Roster
Pitchers: 47 Joaquín Andújar; 38 Floyd Bannister; 37 Tom Dixon; 43 Ken Forsch; 46 Doug Konieczny; 34 Dan Larson; 42 Mark Lemongello; 39 Bo McLaughlin; 36 Joe Niekro; 30 Gene Pentz; 50 J. R. Richard; 35 Joe Sambito; 45 Roy Thomas	Catchers: 13 Joe Ferguson; 8 Ed Herrmann; 53 Luis Pujols; Infielders: 17 Ken Boswell; 23 Enos Cabell; 19 Craig Cacek; 10 Mike Fischlin; 9 Julio González; 18 Art Howe; 14 Roger Metzger; 11 Rob Sperring; 31 Danny Walton; 27 Bob Watson	Outfielders: 20 Joe Cannon; 28 César Cedeño; 21 Willie Crawford; 25 José Cruz; 16 Jim Fuller; 24 Art Gardner; 26 Wilbur Howard; 6 Cliff Johnson; 21 Terry Puhl; 22 Leon Roberts; 29 Denny Walling	Manager: 7 Bill Virdon; Coaches: 4 Deacon Jones; 5 Bob Lillis; 3 Tony Pacheco; 2 Mel Wright

== Game log ==
=== Regular season ===
Legend
	Astros win
	Astros loss
	Postponement
	Eliminated from playoff race
**Bold**	Astros team member

1977 regular season game log: 81–81 (Home: 46–35; Away: 35–46)
April: 9–11 (Home: 6–6; Away: 3–5)

#	Date	Time (CT)	Opponent	Score	Win	Loss	Save	Time of Game	Attendance	Record	Box/ Streak
4	April 11		Reds								
5	April 12		Reds								
6	April 13		Reds								
19	April 29		@ Pirates								
20	April 30		@ Pirates								

May: 11–16 (Home: 7–7; Away: 4–9)

#	Date	Time (CT)	Opponent	Score	Win	Loss	Save	Time of Game	Attendance	Record	Box/ Streak
21	May 1		@ Pirates								
31	May 13		Pirates								
31	May 14		Pirates								
31	May 15		Pirates								
40	May 24		@ Dodgers								
41	May 25		@ Dodgers								
42	May 26		@ Dodgers								
46	May 30		Dodgers								
47	May 31		Dodgers								

June: 13–16 (Home: 7–8; Away: 6–8)

#	Date	Time (CT)	Opponent	Score	Win	Loss	Save	Time of Game	Attendance	Record	Box/ Streak
46	June 1		Dodgers								
49	June 2		@ Reds								
50	June 3		@ Reds								
51	June 4		@ Reds								
52	June 5		@ Reds								

July: 15–14 (Home: 8–5; Away: 7–9)

#	Date	Time (CT)	Opponent	Score	Win	Loss	Save	Time of Game	Attendance	Record	Box/ Streak
82	July 6		@ Dodgers								
83	July 7		@ Dodgers								
84	July 8		Reds								
85	July 9		Reds								
86	July 10		Reds								
87	July 11		Reds								
88	July 12		Dodgers								
89	July 13		Dodgers								
90	July 14		Dodgers								
91	July 15		@ Reds								
92	July 16		@ Reds								
93	July 17		@ Reds								
—	July 19	7:15 p.m. CDT	**48th All-Star Game in Bronx, NY**								
100	July 26		@ Pirates								
101	July 27		@ Pirates								
102	July 28		@ Pirates								

August: 16–12 (Home: 11–3; Away: 5–9)

#	Date	Time (CT)	Opponent	Score	Win	Loss	Save	Time of Game	Attendance	Record	Box/ Streak
106	August 1		Pirates								
107	August 2		Pirates								
108	August 3		Pirates								

September: 16–11 (Home: 6–6; Away: 10–5)

#	Date	Time (CT)	Opponent	Score	Win	Loss	Save	Time of Game	Attendance	Record	Box/ Streak
137	September 5		Reds								
138	September 6		Reds								
144	September 12		@ Reds								
145	September 13		@ Reds								
153	September 23		Dodgers								
154	September 24		Dodgers								
155	September 25		Dodgers								
159	September 29		@ Dodgers								
160	September 30		@ Dodgers								

October: 1–1 (Home: 0–0; Away: 1–1)

#	Date	Time (CT)	Opponent	Score	Win	Loss	Save	Time of Game	Attendance	Record	Box/ Streak
161	October 1		@ Dodgers								
162	October 2		@ Dodgers								

=== Detailed records ===
National League
Opponent	W	L	WP	RS	RA
NL East
Pittsburgh Pirates	4	8	0.333	38	50
Div total	4	8	0.333	38	50
NL West
Cincinnati Reds	13	5	0.722	94	50
**Houston Astros**					
Los Angeles Dodgers	9	9	0.500	63	70
Div total	22	14	0.611	157	120
Season total	26	22	0.542	195	170

Month	Games	Won	Lost	Win %	RS	RA
April
May
June
July
August
September
October
Total

	Games	Won	Lost	Win %	RS	RA
Home
Away
Total

== Player stats ==
=== Batting ===
==== Starters by position ====
Note: Pos = Position; G = Games played; AB = At bats; H = Hits; Avg. = Batting average; HR = Home runs; RBI = Runs batted in

Pos	Player	G	AB	H	Avg.	HR	RBI
C	Joe Ferguson	132	421	108	.257	16	61
1B	Bob Watson	151	554	160	.289	22	110
2B	Art Howe	125	413	109	.264	8	58
SS	Roger Metzger	97	269	50	.186	0	16
3B	Enos Cabell	150	625	176	.282	16	68
LF	Terry Puhl	60	229	69	.301	0	10
CF	César Cedeño	141	530	148	.279	14	71
RF	José Cruz	157	579	173	.299	17	87

==== Other batters ====
Note: G = Games played; AB = At bats; H = Hits; Avg. = Batting average; HR = Home runs; RBI = Runs batted in

Player	G	AB	H	Avg.	HR	RBI
Julio González	110	383	94	.245	1	27
Wilbur Howard	87	187	48	.257	2	13
Ed Herrmann	56	158	46	.291	1	17
Cliff Johnson	51	144	43	.299	10	23
Rob Sperring	58	129	24	.186	1	9
Willie Crawford	42	114	29	.254	2	18
Jim Fuller	34	100	16	.160	2	9
Ken Boswell	72	97	21	.216	0	12
Art Gardner	66	65	10	.154	0	3
Leon Roberts	19	27	2	.074	0	2
Denny Walling	6	21	6	.286	0	6
Danny Walton	13	21	4	.190	0	1
Craig Cacek	7	20	1	.050	0	1
Joe Cannon	9	17	2	.118	0	1
Mike Fischlin	13	15	3	.200	0	0
Luis Pujols	6	15	1	.067	0	0

=== Pitching ===
==== Starting pitchers ====
Note: G = Games pitched; IP = Innings pitched; W = Wins; L = Losses; ERA = Earned run average; SO = Strikeouts

Player	G	IP	W	L	ERA	SO
J. R. Richard	36	267.0	18	12	2.97	214
Mark Lemongello	34	214.2	9	14	3.48	83
Joaquín Andújar	26	158.2	11	8	3.69	69
Floyd Bannister	24	142.2	8	9	4.04	112
Doug Konieczny	4	21.0	1	1	6.00	7

==== Other pitchers ====
Note: G = Games pitched; IP = Innings pitched; W = Wins; L = Losses; ERA = Earned run average; SO = Strikeouts

Player	G	IP	W	L	ERA	SO
Joe Niekro	44	180.2	13	8	3.04	101
Dan Larson	32	97.2	1	7	5.81	44
Tom Dixon	9	30.1	1	0	3.26	15

==== Relief pitchers ====
Note: G = Games pitched; W = Wins; L = Losses; SV = Saves; ERA = Earned run average; SO = Strikeouts

Player	G	W	L	SV	ERA	SO
Ken Forsch	42	5	8	8	2.72	45
Joe Sambito	54	5	5	7	2.33	67
Bo McLaughlin	46	4	7	5	4.25	59
Gene Pentz	41	5	2	2	3.83	51
Roy Thomas	4	0	0	0	2.84	4

== Awards and achievements ==
=== Offensive achievements ===
==== Hitting for the cycle ====
Date	Player	H / AB	R	1B	2B	3B	HR	BI	Other	Score	Opponent	Box
June 24	Bob Watson	4-for-4	1	8	3	1	5	4		6–5	San Francisco Giants	
Watson: 2B (11) • 3B (5) • HR (9) • RBI (41)

==== Grand slams ====
No.	Date	Astros batter	Venue	Inning	Pitcher	Opposing team	Box
1	August 15	Art Howe (Note: 1st MLB grand slam)	Three Rivers Stadium	1	Buzz Capra	Pittsburgh Pirates	
2	September 4	Bob Watson	Olympic Stadium	1 (Note: Tied score or took lead)	Jackie Brown	Montreal Expos	

=== Awards ===
1977 Houston Astros award winners
Name of award		Recipient	Ref.
Houston Astros Most Valuable Player (MVP)		José Cruz	
MLB All-Star Game	Reserve pitcher	Joaquín Andújar	
National League (NL) Player of the Month	September	César Cedeño	
National League (NL) Player of the Week	September 25	César Cedeño	

Other awards results

Name of award	Voting recipient(s) (Team)	Ref.
NL Rookie of the Year	1st—Dawson (MON) • 4th—Bannister (HOU)	

=== League leaders ===
Batting

- Sacrifice flies: José Cruz (10)

== Minor league system ==
Level	Team	League	Manager
AAA	Charleston Charlies	International League	Jim Beauchamp
AA	Columbus Astros	Southern League	Leo Posada
A	Cocoa Astros	Florida State League	Jimmy Johnson
Rookie	GCL Astros	Gulf Coast League	Julio Linares

League champions

- International League champions: Charleston
