= Dan Dumoulin =

American baseball player (born 1953)

- Pitcher
- Born: August 20, 1953 (age 72); Kokomo, Indiana, U.S.
- Batted: Right Threw: Right

MLB debut
- September 5, 1977, for the Cincinnati Reds

Last MLB appearance
- October 1, 1978, for the Cincinnati Reds

MLB statistics
- Win–loss record: 1–0
- Earned run average: 7.84
- Strikeouts: 7
- Stats at Baseball Reference

Teams
- Cincinnati Reds (1977–1978)

Daniel Lynn Dumoulin (born August 20, 1953) is an American former Major League Baseball pitcher. He played parts of two seasons, 1977 and 1978, for the Cincinnati Reds. He appeared in a total of eight games, all as a relief pitcher.

== Sources ==
- Career statistics from Baseball Reference · Baseball Reference (Minors) · Retrosheet · Baseball Almanac
