= Julio González (infielder) =

Puerto Rican baseball player (born 1952)

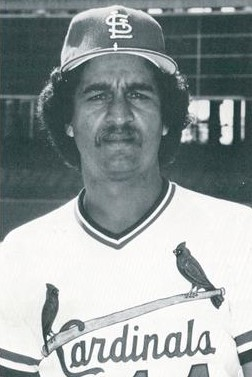
- Infielder
- Born: December 25, 1952 (age 73); Caguas, Puerto Rico
- Batted: Right Threw: Right

MLB debut
- April 8, 1977, for the Houston Astros

Last MLB appearance
- June 19, 1983, for the Detroit Tigers

MLB statistics
- Batting average: .235
- Home runs: 4
- Runs batted in: 66
- Stats at Baseball Reference

Teams
- Houston Astros (1977–80); St. Louis Cardinals (1981–82); Detroit Tigers (1983)

Julio César González Hernández (born December 25, 1952) is a Puerto Rican former Major League Baseball infielder. He played all or part of seven seasons in the majors from 1977 until 1983. He played about equally at shortstop and second base, with a lesser but still substantial number of games at third base. He was traded from the Chicago Cubs to the Houston Astros for Greg Gross at the Winter Meetings on December 8, 1976.

== Sources ==
- Career statistics from Baseball Reference · Retrosheet · Baseball Almanac
