= Mike Garman =

American baseball player (born 1949)

- Pitcher
- Born: September 16, 1949 (age 76); Caldwell, Idaho, U.S.
- Batted: Right Threw: Right

MLB debut
- September 22, 1969, for the Boston Red Sox

Last MLB appearance
- September 29, 1978, for the Montreal Expos

MLB statistics
- Win–loss record: 22–27
- Earned run average: 3.63
- Strikeouts: 213
- Stats at Baseball Reference

Teams
- Boston Red Sox (1969, 1971–1973); St. Louis Cardinals (1974–1975); Chicago Cubs (1976); Los Angeles Dodgers (1977–1978); Montreal Expos (1978)

Michael Douglas Garman (born September 16, 1949) is an American former professional baseball player. A relief pitcher, he played for five different teams in Major League Baseball (MLB) between 1969 and 1978. He was a first-round draft selection of the Boston Red Sox in the 1967 MLB draft. Listed at 6 feet 3 inches (191 cm) and 215 pounds (98 kg), he threw and batted right-handed.

== Career ==
=== Boston Red Sox ===
Born and raised in Caldwell, Idaho, Garman was the third overall selection in the 1967 MLB draft, chosen by the Boston Red Sox. His brother, Stephen, spent two seasons in the San Francisco Giants organization.

Garman signed with the Red Sox upon graduation at age 17 from Caldwell High School, and was assigned to the Greenville Red Sox of the Western Carolinas League. He lost the only game he appeared in for Greenville, giving up three hits and two walks in the only inning he pitched. He was then reassigned to the Winston-Salem Red Sox, where he went 1–3 with a 6.75 earned run average.

After three seasons in Boston's farm system, Garman debuted with the BoSox as a September call-up in 1969, and won his major league debut against the New York Yankees just six days after his twentieth birthday. After spending all of 1970 in the minors, he joined the Sox as a September call-up in 1971 and 1972 as well, and made the big league roster out of the bullpen in 1973. He had no decisions in twelve appearances as manager Eddie Kasko used him mostly in mop up roles.

=== St. Louis Cardinals ===
Following his only full season with the BoSox, he was traded with John Curtis and Lynn McGlothen to the St. Louis Cardinals for Reggie Cleveland, Terry Hughes and Diego Segui.

It was with the Cardinals where Garman enjoyed his best seasons. He was 7–2 with a 2.64 ERA and six saves in 1974. Though his record dipped to 3–8 in 1975, his ERA did as well, to 2.39. He also collected ten saves. He was traded to the Chicago Cubs with a player to be named later for Don Kessinger. In his only season in Chicago, Garman made two emergency starts in the second games of double headers, losing both.

=== Los Angeles Dodgers ===
On January 11, 1977, the Cubs sent Garman and Rick Monday to the Los Angeles Dodgers for Bill Buckner, Ivan De Jesus and Jeff Albert. While with the Dodgers, he reached the post season for the only time in his career, appearing in two games of the 1977 National League Championship Series and two games in the 1977 World Series without giving up an earned run.

Garman was later traded in May 1978 to the Montreal Expos for Gerry Hannahs and Larry Landreth. After one season with the Expos, he failed to make the team in 1979 spring training after which he signed a minor league deal with the Pittsburgh Pirates, and also spent part of that season with the Cleveland Indians' triple A affiliate before retiring.
