= 1977 Major League Baseball postseason =

1977 Major League Baseball playoffs

Tournament details
- Dates: October 4–18, 1977
- Teams: 4

Final positions
- Champions: New York Yankees (21st title)
- Runners-up: Los Angeles Dodgers

Tournament statistics
- Games played: 15
- Attendance: 813,005 (54,200 per game)
- Most HRs: Reggie Jackson (NYY) (5)
- Most SBs: Three tied (2)
- Best ERA: Sparky Lyle (NYY) (1.29)
- Most Ks (as pitcher): Mike Torrez (NYY) (35)

Awards
- MVP: Reggie Jackson (NYY)

The 1977 Major League Baseball postseason was the playoff tournament of Major League Baseball for the 1977 season. The winners of each division advance to the postseason and face each other in a League Championship Series to determine the pennant winners that face each other in the World Series.

In the American League, both the New York Yankees and the Kansas City Royals returned for the second year in a row.

In the National League, the Philadelphia Phillies made their second consecutive appearance, and the Los Angeles Dodgers returned for the second time in four years. This was the first edition of the postseason to feature three 100-win teams, a phenomenon that would not occur again until 1998.

This was the first of two consecutive postseasons to feature the Yankees, Royals, Phillies, and Dodgers. The former three teams would again appear in the postseason in 1980, and all four would appear again in the expanded 1981 and 2024 postseasons.

The playoffs began on October 4, 1977, and concluded on October 18, 1977, with the New York Yankees defeating the Los Angeles Dodgers in the 1977 World Series. It was the Yankees' first championship since 1962 and their 21st title overall.

== Teams ==
American League Teams National League Teams

The following teams qualified for the postseason:

=== American League ===
- New York Yankees – 100–62, AL East champions
- Kansas City Royals – 102–60, AL West champions

=== National League ===
- Philadelphia Phillies – 101–61, NL East champions
- Los Angeles Dodgers – 98–64, NL West champions

== Playoff bracket ==
League Championship Series (ALCS, NLCS)
East	NY Yankees	3
West	Kansas City	2
East	Philadelphia	1
West	Los Angeles	3

World Series
AL	NY Yankees	4
NL	Los Angeles	2

== American League Championship Series ==
=== Kansas City Royals vs. New York Yankees ===
New York won the series, 3–2.

Game	Date	Score	Location	Time	Attendance
1	October 5	Kansas City Royals – 7, New York Yankees – 2	Yankee Stadium	2:40	54,930
2	October 6	Kansas City Royals – 2, New York Yankees – 6	Yankee Stadium	2:58	56,230
3	October 7	New York Yankees – 2, Kansas City Royals – 6	Royals Stadium	2:19	41,285
4	October 8	New York Yankees – 6, Kansas City Royals – 4	Royals Stadium	3:08	41,135
5	October 9	New York Yankees – 5, Kansas City Royals – 3	Royals Stadium	3:04	41,133

This was the second straight ALCS to feature the Yankees and Royals. The Yankees took the previous series in five games on a Chris Chambliss home run in the ninth inning of Game 5. The Yankees again defeated the Royals in five games to advance to the World Series for the second year in a row.

Paul Splittorff pitched eight solid innings as the Royals blew out the Yankees in Game 1. In Game 2, Cliff Johnson’s home run in the bottom of the fifth ignited the Yankees’ offense as they came from behind to even the series headed to Kansas City. In Game 3, Dennis Leonard pitched a complete game as the Royals prevailed by four runs to regain the series lead. Sparky Lyle pitched five innings of shutout ball in relief in Game 4 as he stopped a rally by the Royals to help the Yankees force a decisive fifth game. In Game 5, the Royals held a 3–2 lead going into the ninth and were three outs away from their first pennant, but the Yankees yet again defeated the Royals in their last at bat, scoring three unanswered runs to take the lead for good and secure the pennant as Lyle earned his second victory of the series.

Both teams would meet again in the ALCS the next year, which the Yankees also won en route to repeating as World Series champions. It would be in 1980 that the Royals would finally break through against the Yankees, but they came up short in the World Series. They would also meet again in the ALDS in 2024, which was won by the Yankees before falling in the World Series.

== National League Championship Series ==
=== Philadelphia Phillies vs. Los Angeles Dodgers ===
Los Angeles won the series, 3–1.

Game	Date	Score	Location	Time	Attendance
1	October 4	Philadelphia Phillies – 7, Los Angeles Dodgers – 5	Dodger Stadium	2:35	55,968
2	October 5	Philadelphia Phillies – 1, Los Angeles Dodgers – 7	Dodger Stadium	2:14	55,973
3	October 7	Los Angeles Dodgers – 6, Philadelphia Phillies – 5	Veterans Stadium	2:59	63,719
4	October 8	Los Angeles Dodgers – 4, Philadelphia Phillies – 1	Veterans Stadium	2:39	64,924

This was the first postseason meeting between the Dodgers and Phillies. The Dodgers defeated the Phillies in four games to advance to the World Series for the second time in four years (in the process denying a rematch of the 1950 World Series between the Yankees and Phillies).

Game 1 was a slugfest which the Phillies narrowly won in the top of the ninth off RBI singles from Mike Schmidt and Larry Bowa. The Dodgers blew out the Phillies in Game 2 off a complete game performance from Don Sutton, evening the series headed to Philadelphia. Game 3 went down in Phillies' baseball lore as "Black Friday." The Phillies held a 5–3 lead going into the top of the ninth, but the Dodgers scored three unanswered runs to prevail and take a 2–1 series lead. It was the first time since Game 4 of the 1947 World Series that the Dodgers won a postseason game when trailing going into the ninth. Tommy John pitched a complete game for the Dodgers in Game 4 as they secured the pennant.

Both teams would meet each other again in the NLCS in 1978, 1983, 2008, and 2009, with the Dodgers winning in the former series before falling in the World Series again, and the Phillies taking the latter three series with a World Series win in 2008. They would also meet in the NLDS in 2025, which the Dodgers won en route to repeating as World Series champions.

== 1977 World Series ==
=== New York Yankees (AL) vs. Los Angeles Dodgers (NL) ===
New York won the series, 4–2.

Game	Date	Score	Location	Time	Attendance
1	October 11	Los Angeles Dodgers – 3, New York Yankees – 4 (12)	Yankee Stadium	3:24	56,668
2	October 12	Los Angeles Dodgers – 6, New York Yankees – 1	Yankee Stadium	2:27	56,691
3	October 14	New York Yankees – 5, Los Angeles Dodgers – 3	Dodger Stadium	2:31	55,992
4	October 15	New York Yankees – 4, Los Angeles Dodgers – 2	Dodger Stadium	2:07	55,995
5	October 16	New York Yankees – 4, Los Angeles Dodgers – 10	Dodger Stadium	2:29	55,955
6	October 18	Los Angeles Dodgers – 4, New York Yankees – 8	Yankee Stadium	2:18	56,407

This was the ninth World Series meeting in the history of the Dodgers-Yankees rivalry, and the fourth New York–California matchup in the World Series (1962, 1963, 1973). The Yankees and Dodgers last met in 1963, which the Dodgers won in a sweep. In this World Series between the two historic rivals, the Yankees defeated the Dodgers in six games to capture their first championship since 1962.

Game 1 was a long extra-inning grind that was won by the Yankees off a walk-off RBI single from Paul Blair in the bottom of the twelfth. Burt Hooton pitched a five-hit complete game as the Dodgers took Game 2 to even the series headed to Los Angeles. In Game 3, despite an early blunder in which he surrendered a three-run homer to Dusty Baker in the bottom of the third, Yankee-starter Mike Torrez pitched a seven-hit complete game as the Yankees regained the series lead. Ron Guidry pitched yet another complete game for the Yankees as they took Game 4 to go up 3–1 in the series. In Game 5, Don Sutton threw the fourth straight complete game of the World Series as the Dodgers blew out the Yankees to send the series back to the Bronx. In Game 6, Torrez earned his second complete game victory as the Yankees prevailed by four runs, capped off by a solo home run from Reggie Jackson in the bottom of the eighth which sealed the title for New York.

The Dodgers and Yankees would meet each other again the next year, in 1981, and 2024, with the Yankees winning the former and the Dodgers winning the latter two.

== Broadcasting ==
NBC televised both LCS nationally in the United States. Each team's local broadcaster also televised coverage of LCS games. ABC aired the World Series.
