= Steve Davis (infielder) =

American baseball player (born 1953)

- Infielder
- Born: December 30, 1953 (age 72); Oakland, California, U.S.
- Batted: Right Threw: Right

MLB debut
- September 23, 1979, for the Chicago Cubs

Last MLB appearance
- September 30, 1979, for the Chicago Cubs

MLB statistics
- Batting average: .000
- Home runs: 0
- Runs batted in: 1
- Stats at Baseball Reference

Teams
- Chicago Cubs (1979)

Steven Michael Davis (born December 30, 1953) is an American former right-handed infielder in Major League Baseball for the Chicago Cubs.

Davis was drafted by the Cubs at age 21, in the 14th round of the 1976 June amateur draft, out of Stanford University. He did not make his professional debut until 1978, when the Cubs assigned him to AAA Wichita. He played the entirety of the 1978 and 1979 Syracuse seasons and earned a late season call-up to the Cubs in 1979. Davis made his major league debut as a defensive replacement for Mick Kelleher in the ninth inning of a 6-0 Cubs loss to the Pittsburgh Pirates on September 23. He had an assist on a groundout but did not bat.

On September 25, Davis got the only at-bats of his major league career, playing the entire second game of a doubleheader against the New York Mets at third base. In his first at-bat, he grounded out, but Dave Kingman scored on the play, earning Davis the only RBI of his career. He ended up 0-for-4 on the day. Davis made one more appearance on September 30, but only appeared in the field as a second baseman.

Davis signed with the Toronto Blue Jays organization in the off-season and spent the 1980 and 1981 seasons with the Syracuse Chiefs before retiring from baseball.
