= 1977 National League Championship Series =

9th edition of Major League Baseball's National League Championship Series

Team (Wins)	Managers	Season
Los Angeles Dodgers (3)	Tommy Lasorda	98–64, .605, GA: 10
Philadelphia Phillies (1)	Danny Ozark	101–61, .623, GA: 5
- Dates: October 4–8
- MVP: Dusty Baker (Los Angeles)
- Umpires: Paul Pryor (crew chief); Bob Engel; Harry Wendelstedt; Bruce Froemming; Dutch Rennert; Paul Runge

Broadcast
- Television: NBC; KTTV (LAD); WPHL-TV (PHI)
- TV announcers: NBC: Joe Garagiola and Tony Kubek (Games 1–2); Jim Simpson and Maury Wills (Game 3); Dick Enberg and Don Drysdale (Game 4); KTTV: Vin Scully, Jerry Doggett and Ross Porter; WPHL-TV: Harry Kalas, Richie Ashburn and Andy Musser
- Radio: CBS
- Radio announcers: Ralph Kiner and Jerry Coleman

The 1977 National League Championship Series was a best-of-five matchup in Major League Baseball’s 1977 postseason between the West Division champion Los Angeles Dodgers and the East Division champion Philadelphia Phillies. It was the ninth NLCS in all. The Dodgers beat the Phillies three games to one and went on to lose the 1977 World Series to the New York Yankees.

== Summary ==
=== Philadelphia Phillies vs. Los Angeles Dodgers ===
Los Angeles won the series, 3–1.

Game	Date	Score	Location	Time	Attendance
1	October 4	Philadelphia Phillies – 7, Los Angeles Dodgers – 5	Dodger Stadium	2:35	55,968
2	October 5	Philadelphia Phillies – 1, Los Angeles Dodgers – 7	Dodger Stadium	2:14	55,973
3	October 7	Los Angeles Dodgers – 6, Philadelphia Phillies – 5	Veterans Stadium	2:59	63,719
4	October 8	Los Angeles Dodgers – 4, Philadelphia Phillies – 1	Veterans Stadium	2:39	64,924

== Game summaries ==
=== Game 1 ===
October 4, 1977 5:15 pm (PT) at Dodger Stadium in Los Angeles, California 68 °F (20 °C), partly cloudy
Team	1	2	3	4	5	6	7	8	9	R	H	E
Philadelphia	2	0	0	0	2	1	0	0	2	7	9	0
Los Angeles	0	0	0	0	1	0	4	0	0	5	9	2
WP: Gene Garber (1–0) LP: Elías Sosa (0–1) Sv: Tug McGraw (1); Home runs: PHI: Greg Luzinski (1); LAD: Ron Cey (1)

The Phillies took the opening game of the series, winning their first postseason game since Game 1 of the 1915 World Series. They had lost the final four games in 1915, been swept in the 1950 World Series and were swept again in the 1976 National League Championship Series.

Game 1 had been billed as a classic pitching matchup between 1977 Cy Young award winner Steve Carlton and 20-game winner and Comeback Pitcher of the Year Tommy John. It didn't really live up to that, as neither figured in the final decision. The Phillies drew first blood in the first on a two-run homer by Greg Luzinski. They stretched the lead to 4–0 in the fifth on a bases-loaded, two-run single by Davey Johnson. In that inning, the Phils were helped when, on an apparent force-out of Bake McBride by Larry Bowa, Dodger shortstop Bill Russell glided off the second base bag as he received the throw before completing an attempted double play.

The Dodgers finally got on the board in their half of the fifth when Davey Lopes singled in Lee Lacy, who had pinch-hit for John and singled. Lacy scored after being advanced to second on a Carlton balk. The Phillies countered in the sixth on an RBI single by Carlton.

With two outs in the seventh and Lopes on first, Carlton appeared to be on his way out of the inning. However, he issued walks to Bill Russell and Reggie Smith. Ron Cey then made Carlton pay dearly for his loss of control by tying the game at five with a grand slam.

The Phils bounced back in the top of the ninth on an RBI single by Mike Schmidt, his only RBI of the NLCS. They added another run to close out the scoring when Bowa scored on a balk by Dodger reliever Elías Sosa.

=== Game 2 ===
October 5, 1977 5:15 pm (PT) at Dodger Stadium in Los Angeles, California 70 °F (21 °C), mostly cloudy
Team	1	2	3	4	5	6	7	8	9	R	H	E
Philadelphia	0	0	1	0	0	0	0	0	0	1	9	1
Los Angeles	0	0	1	4	0	1	1	0	X	7	9	1
WP: Don Sutton (1–0) LP: Jim Lonborg (0–1); Home runs: PHI: Bake McBride (1); LAD: Dusty Baker (1)

The Phillies got on the board first once again via homer, with Bake McBride hitting a shot off Dodger starter Don Sutton in the third. The Dodgers tied it in the bottom half on an RBI single by Davey Lopes, then broke it wide open on a grand slam by Dusty Baker in the fourth off Jim Lonborg. Meanwhile, Sutton settled in and shut the Phils down the rest of the way, yielding nine hits in the complete game. The Dodgers added single runs in the sixth and seventh on an RBI single by Steve Yeager and an RBI triple to center by Reggie Smith, chased down and briefly caught by McBride, but dropped when he impacted the unpadded wall.

=== Game 3 ===
October 7, 1977 3:15 pm (ET) at Veterans Stadium in Philadelphia, Pennsylvania 59 °F (15 °C), overcast
Team	1	2	3	4	5	6	7	8	9	R	H	E
Los Angeles	0	2	0	1	0	0	0	0	3	6	12	2
Philadelphia	0	3	0	0	0	0	0	2	0	5	6	2
WP: Lance Rautzhan (1–0) LP: Gene Garber (1–1) Sv: Mike Garman (1)

Game 3 went down in Philadelphia baseball annals as "Black Friday." The Dodgers opened the scoring in the second off Larry Christenson when Dusty Baker doubled home Steve Garvey from first on a close play at the plate. TV replays clearly showed Phillies' catcher Bob Boone had the plate blocked and Garvey never touched home on the play, but home plate umpire Harry Wendlestedt ruled safe. Steve Yeager followed with a single to score Baker to make it 2–0. Yeager tried to score when pitcher Burt Hooton doubled, but was gunned down at the plate.

In the bottom of the second, with two outs and Richie Hebner on second and Bob Boone on first, Dodger starter Burt Hooton began to dispute a number of borderline ball/strike calls issued by home plate umpire Harry Wendelstedt. The normally unflappable Hooton's visible frustration aroused the displeasure of Philadelphia's infamous "boobird" fans, who took out their wrath upon their team's opponent. As the volume of more than 63,000 fans escalated, including derisive chants of "Hoot, Hoot, Hoot" in unison, the rattled Hooton uncharacteristically lost control of both his composure and his pitching. He walked Ted Sizemore to load the bases and then walked pitcher Larry Christenson, Bake McBride, and Larry Bowa in succession to force in three runs and give the Phillies a 3–2 lead. Dodger manager Tommy Lasorda then pulled Hooton in favor of Rick Rhoden, who induced Mike Schmidt into popping up to end the threat.

While Rhoden and Doug Rau were busy shutting down the Phils, the Dodgers tied the game in the fourth on a one-out RBI single by Baker. The Dodgers threatened for more when Rick Monday singled Baker to second, then both advanced on a wild pitch by Warren Brusstar. After Yeager was walked intentionally, Rhoden flied out to McBride in shallow right and McBride gunned down Baker at the plate attempting to score. The score stayed tied at 3–3 until the bottom of the eighth, setting up a wild finish.

Hebner led off the eighth with a double. Garry Maddox singled home Hebner and went all the way to third as Reggie Smith's throw home to try to nail Hebner went wild. Maddox then scored when Bob Boone grounded to Ron Cey at third and Cey threw wildly to first. With a 5–3 lead entering the ninth and ace reliever Gene Garber on the mound, the Phillies seemed in control.

Garber retired the first two hitters and got ahead of pinch-hitter Vic Davalillo 0–1. But Davalillo, noticing Ted Sizemore playing unusually deep at second, shocked the Phillies with a drag bunt for a single. Lasorda then sent another pinch hitter, Manny Mota, to hit for pitcher Lance Rautzhan. Mota, on an 0–2 pitch, sent a deep drive to left that Greg Luzinski reached, but the ball caromed off his glove, onto the wall, and back. Luzinski threw to second to try to nail Mota, but his throw skipped wildly past Sizemore allowing Davalillo to score and Mota to reach third. Phillie manager Danny Ozark came under fire for not having Jerry Martin, a faster outfielder, in left field (a defensive substitution Ozark made often throughout the season) as Martin likely would have reached Mota's liner easier than the bigger, slower Luzinski.

Davey Lopes followed by hitting a blistering grounder to third that took a wicked hop and struck Mike Schmidt in the left knee. Larry Bowa barehanded the ricocheted ball out of the air, and fired to first. On a very close play, umpire Bruce Froemming called Lopes safe. The Phillies protested, but to no avail. Meanwhile, Mota scored to tie the game at 5–5.

Garber, in an attempt to pick off Lopes at first, threw wildly past Hebner, sending Lopes to second. Bill Russell then singled to center to score Lopes with the go-ahead run, before the stunned crowd. Mike Garman retired the side in the ninth for the Dodgers, who narrowly escaped defeat. It was the first time since Game 4 of the 1947 World Series that the Dodgers won a postseason game when trailing going into the ninth inning.

=== Game 4 ===
October 8, 1977 8:15 pm (ET) at Veterans Stadium in Philadelphia, Pennsylvania 55 °F (13 °C), rain
Team	1	2	3	4	5	6	7	8	9	R	H	E
Los Angeles	0	2	0	0	2	0	0	0	0	4	5	0
Philadelphia	0	0	0	1	0	0	0	0	0	1	7	0
WP: Tommy John (1–0) LP: Steve Carlton (0–1); Home runs: LAD: Dusty Baker (2); PHI: None

The Phillies did not recover after a controversial finish of game 3 as the Dodgers clinched the pennant in a game that was delayed two hours by rain after the first inning. Facing elimination, the Phillies brought ace pitcher Steve Carlton back on three days' rest. In a game played in anything from a drizzle to a steady rain, the Dodgers punched their ticket to the World Series on the strength of a two-run homer in the second by Dusty Baker, who was named NLCS MVP. Tommy John atoned for his Game 1 performance by getting the better of Carlton this time, only allowing a single run in the fourth on an RBI double by Richie Hebner.

Two more Dodger runs came across in the fifth when Baker scored on a Carlton wild pitch and Steve Yeager came home on a Bill Russell suicide squeeze bunt that the wet surface made difficult to field. Baker's homer was all John needed, however. Throughout the game, the umpires appeared to consult with National League President Chub Feeney, who was in attendance, about delaying or postponing the game. But the game went on, despite nearly unplayable conditions, as John went the distance for the seven-hit complete game, recording eight strikeouts.

== Composite box ==
1977 NLCS (3–1): Los Angeles Dodgers over Philadelphia Phillies

Team	1	2	3	4	5	6	7	8	9	R	H	E
Los Angeles Dodgers	0	4	1	5	3	1	5	0	3	22	35	5
Philadelphia Phillies	2	3	1	1	2	1	0	2	2	14	31	3
Total attendance: 240,584 Average attendance: 60,146
