= Diego Seguí =

Cuban baseball player (1937–2025)

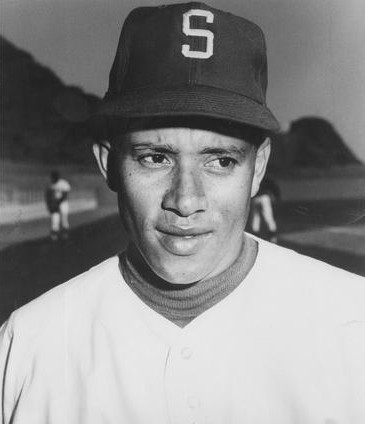
- Seguí in 1969
- Pitcher
- Born: August 17, 1937; Holguín, Cuba
- Died: June 24, 2025 (aged 87); Kansas City, Kansas, U.S.
- Batted: Right Threw: Right

MLB debut
- April 12, 1962, for the Kansas City Athletics

Last MLB appearance
- September 24, 1977, for the Seattle Mariners

MLB statistics
- Win–loss record: 92–111
- Earned run average: 3.81
- Strikeouts: 1,298
- Saves: 71
- Stats at Baseball Reference

Teams
- Kansas City Athletics (1962–1965); Washington Senators (1966); Kansas City / Oakland Athletics (1967–1968); Seattle Pilots (1969); Oakland Athletics (1970–1972); St. Louis Cardinals (1972–1973); Boston Red Sox (1974–1975); Seattle Mariners (1977)

Career highlights and awards
- AL ERA leader (1970)

Member of the Venezuelan

Baseball Hall of Fame
- Induction: 2003

Diego Pablo Seguí González (Spanish: [ˈdjeɣo ˈpaβlo seˈɣi ɣonˈsales]; August 17, 1937 – June 24, 2025) was a Cuban professional baseball player. He played in Major League Baseball (MLB) as a right-handed pitcher for the Kansas City / Oakland Athletics, Washington Senators, Seattle Pilots, St. Louis Cardinals, Boston Red Sox, and Seattle Mariners. Seguí was a forkball specialist who was the 1970 American League ERA leader.

== Professional baseball career ==
Seguí was born in Holguín, Cuba.

In 1970 with Oakland, Seguí went 10–10 with two saves in 47 appearances (19 starts) while leading the American League pitchers with a 2.56 ERA.

On December 7, 1973, he was traded by St. Louis along with Reggie Cleveland and Terry Hughes to the Red Sox in exchange for John Curtis, Lynn McGlothen, and Mike Garman.

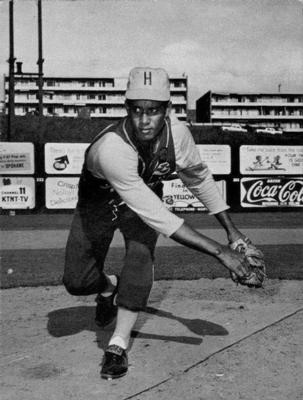
Seguí with the Hawaii Islanders in 1961

Seguí holds the unique distinction of having pitched for both of Seattle's major league baseball teams, the Pilots and the Mariners, in the first game ever played by each franchise. In these contests, he earned a hold for the Pilots in 1969, and absorbed the opening-day loss for the Mariners in 1977.

His most productive season came in 1969 for the Pilots, when he posted career-highs in wins (12) and saves (6), against only 6 losses. At the end of the season, his teammates voted him the Pilots' Most Valuable Player.

After he started the Mariners' inaugural game in 1977, he was dubbed "the Ancient Mariner," and, although he set a Mariners single-game record with 10 strikeouts early in the season on May 5, he failed to get a win the rest of the way. After compiling a 0–7 record with two saves and a 5.69 ERA in 40 games (seven starts), he was released at the end of the season.

Seguí continued pitching in the Mexican League for another 10 years, tossing a no-hitter for the Cafeteros de Córdoba during the 1978 season. During his Mexican stint, he amassed a 96–61 record with a 2.91 ERA and 1,025 strikeouts in 193 pitching appearances.

Seguí also pitched with four teams in the Venezuelan Winter League during 15 seasons between 1962 and 1983. He posted a 95–58 record and a 2.76 ERA in 213 games, setting a league's all-time record with 941 strikeouts, to surpass Aurelio Monteagudo (897) and José Bracho (748). This record is still unbeaten. He also ranks second in wins behind Bracho (109), third in complete games (68), and is fourth both in ERA and innings pitched (1249 2/3).

Seguí was inducted into the Venezuelan Baseball Hall of Fame and Museum in 2003. He also gained induction into the Hispanic Heritage Baseball Museum Hall of Fame on August 19, 2006, in San Francisco, California. In 2024, he was given the Negro Leagues Beisbol Lifetime Achievement Award by the Negro Leagues Baseball Museum.

== Personal life and death ==
His son, David Segui, is a former 15-season major league first baseman.

Segui died on June 24, 2025, at the age of 87. He is buried at Chapel Hill Funeral Home and Memorial Gardens in Kansas City.

== See also ==
- List of Major League Baseball players from Cuba
- List of Major League Baseball annual ERA leaders

Awards and achievements
| Preceded by New team | Opening Day starting pitcher for the Seattle Mariners; 1977 | Succeeded by Glenn Abbott |
