= Terry Hughes (baseball) =

American baseball player (born 1949)

- Third baseman
- Born: May 13, 1949 (age 77); Spartanburg, South Carolina, U.S.
- Batted: Right Threw: Right

MLB debut
- September 2, 1970, for the Chicago Cubs

Last MLB appearance
- October 2, 1974, for the Boston Red Sox

MLB statistics
- Games: 54
- Hits: 18
- Batting average: .209
- Stats at Baseball Reference

Teams
- Chicago Cubs (1970); St. Louis Cardinals (1973); Boston Red Sox (1974)

Terry Wayne Hughes (born May 13, 1949) is an American former Major League Baseball third baseman. Listed at 6'1", 185 lb., Hughes batted and threw right-handed.

Hughes attended Paul M. Dorman High School, and was a heavily scouted prospect in both basketball and baseball by the end of his freshman season. The Chicago Cubs selected him second overall in the 1967 Major League Baseball draft.

He appeared in two games with the Cubs in 1970, but was essentially a career minor leaguer when the St. Louis Cardinals purchased his contract before the 1973 season. He spent most of the season with the triple A Tulsa Oilers, however, appeared in eleven games with the Cards, in which he batted .214 with an RBI and a run scored.

Following his only season in the Cardinals organization, he was traded with Reggie Cleveland and Diego Segui to the Boston Red Sox for Lynn McGlothen, John Curtis and Mike Garman. He appeared in 41 games for the Red Sox, mostly as a late inning replacement for Rico Petrocelli, and batted .203 with six runs batted in, including his only major league home run off the Cleveland Indians' Milt Wilcox.

After spending all of 1975 with the triple A Pawtucket Red Sox, Hughes rejoined the Cardinals for the 1976 season, however spent the entire season with the triple A Tulsa Oilers. In a three-season career, Hughes hit .209 (18-for-86) with one home run and seven RBI in 54 games, including six runs and three doubles. He is now a Physical Education coach at Boiling Springs Rainbow Lake Middle School.
