= Willie Crawford =

American baseball player (1946–2004)

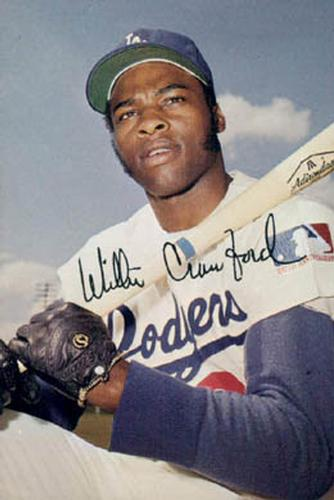
- Outfielder
- Born: September 7, 1946; Los Angeles, California, U.S.
- Died: August 27, 2004 (aged 57); Los Angeles, California, U.S.
- Batted: Left Threw: Left

MLB debut
- September 16, 1964, for the Los Angeles Dodgers

Last MLB appearance
- October 1, 1977, for the Oakland Athletics

MLB statistics
- Batting average: .268
- Home runs: 86
- Runs batted in: 419
- Stats at Baseball Reference

Teams
- Los Angeles Dodgers (1964–1975); St. Louis Cardinals (1976); Houston Astros (1977); Oakland Athletics (1977)

Career highlights and awards
- World Series champion (1965)

Willie Murphy Crawford (September 7, 1946 – August 27, 2004) was an American professional baseball outfielder. He played in the major leagues with the Los Angeles Dodgers (1964–1975), St. Louis Cardinals (1976), Houston Astros (1977) and Oakland Athletics (1977). Crawford was born in Los Angeles, California. He batted and threw left-handed, and was the father of UCLA football player Willie Crawford who graduated from Beverly Hills High School in 1988.

At Fremont High School in Los Angeles, Crawford was All-City in both football (1963) and baseball. Able to run 100 yards in 9.7 seconds, he was highly recruited to play college football as a running back. Al Campanis signed Crawford for the Dodgers for $100,000 two days after he graduated from high school in 1964. Because of the Bonus Rule in existence at the time, Crawford had to play for the Dodgers' major league team in both 1964 and 1965.

As a major league baseball player, defensively, he played in a shallow manner, so as to cut down on potential Texas Leaguers. Crawford's strong arm was able to cut down ambitious baserunners. Also, he was able to get a good jump on the ball and used his full speed to track down deep fly balls.

== Career ==
Crawford debuted on September 16, 1964, at the age of 18. As a rookie, he batted .313 (5-for-16) with three runs, one double, and stole a base. He had a pinch-hit single in Game 1 of the 1965 World Series. The Dodgers lost that game, although in seven games they defeated the Minnesota Twins in the Series.

On April 7, 1970, Reds pitcher Gary Nolan defeated the Dodgers, 4–0, on a 2-hitter. Both hits were by Crawford, in the 4th and 9th innings.

In his best season, 1973, he hit .295, with 14 home runs and 66 runs batted in, playing in 145 games. In 1974, after hitting .295 again with 11 home runs and 61 runs batted in during the season, he hit .333 and belted a home run against Oakland in the World Series.

Crawford played for the Dodgers through the end of the 1975 season, compiling a .268 average, with 74 home runs and 335 runs batted in during 989 games. He was traded to the St. Louis Cardinals in March 1976, where he hit .304 in 120 games with nine home runs and 50 runs batted in. He was traded again after the 1976 season. The Cardinals sent Crawford to the San Francisco Giants. He never appeared in a regular-season game with the Giants, who dealt him along with Rob Sperring to the Astros for Rob Andrews and cash during spring training on March 26, 1977. He played 42 games for the Astros and 59 games for Oakland Athletics that season, his last in the major leagues.

During his 12-year career, Crawford appeared in 1,210 games and had a .268 batting average with 86 home runs and 419 runs batted in. His career numbers included 507 runs, 152 doubles, 35 triples, 47 stolen bases, and 431 walks for a .349 on-base percentage. His fielding percentage was .975 at all three outfield positions.

At age 57, Willie Crawford died at Cedars-Sinai Medical Center in Los Angeles, apparently of kidney disease. He was buried in the Forest Lawn – Hollywood Hills Cemetery.
