= Mike Gordon (baseball) =

American baseball player (1953–2014)

- Catcher
- Born: September 11, 1953; Leominster, Massachusetts, U.S.
- Died: May 26, 2014 (aged 60); Boston, Massachusetts, U.S.
- Batted: Switch Threw: Right

MLB debut
- April 7, 1977, for the Chicago Cubs

Last MLB appearance
- July 9, 1978, for the Chicago Cubs

MLB statistics
- Games played: 12
- At bats: 28
- Hits: 2
- Batting average: .071
- Runs batted in: 2
- Stats at Baseball Reference

Teams
- Chicago Cubs (1977–1978)

Michael William Gordon (September 11, 1953 – May 26, 2014) was an American catcher in Major League Baseball who played from 1977 to 1978 for the Chicago Cubs. Listed at 6' 3", 215 lb., he was a switch hitter and threw right handed.

Gordon died of acute myeloid leukemia at Brigham and Women's Hospital in Boston, Massachusetts on May 26, 2014.
