= Steve Ontiveros (infielder) =

American baseball player (born 1951)

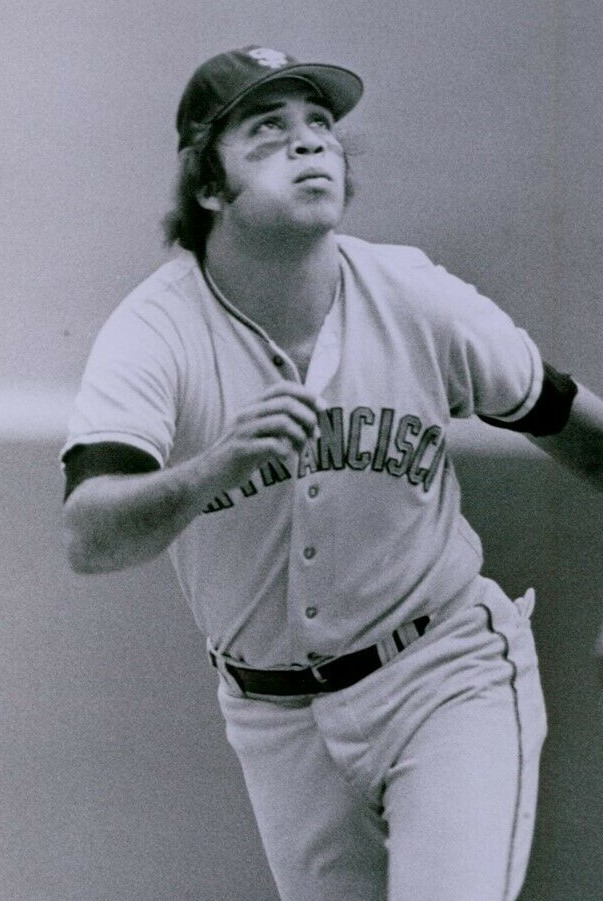
- Third baseman
- Born: October 26, 1951 (age 74); Bakersfield, California, U.S.
- Batted: Switch Threw: Right

MLB debut
- August 5, 1973, for the San Francisco Giants

Last MLB appearance
- June 21, 1980, for the Chicago Cubs

MLB statistics
- Batting average: .274
- Home runs: 24
- Runs batted in: 224
- Stats at Baseball Reference

Teams
- San Francisco Giants (1973–1976); Chicago Cubs (1977–1980); Seibu Lions (1980–1985)

Steven Robert Ontiveros (born October 26, 1951) is a former third baseman in Major League Baseball who played from 1973 through 1980 for the San Francisco Giants (1973–1976) and Chicago Cubs (1977–1980). He also played six seasons in Japan for the Seibu Lions (1980–1985). Ontiveros was a switch-hitter and threw right-handed. He is of Mexican American descent.

A solid third baseman with an average arm, Ontiveros won The Sporting News Minor League Player of the Year Award in 1973. He reached the majors with the San Francisco Giants late in the season, spending four years with them. He was traded along with Bobby Murcer and minor-league right-handed pitcher Andy Muhlstock from the Giants to the Cubs for Bill Madlock and Rob Sperring on February 11, 1977. 1977 ended up being his most productive season for the Cubs, when he posted career-highs in games played (156), batting average (.299), home runs (10), RBI (68), hits (162), and on-base percentage (.390).

In an eight-season MLB career, Ontiveros hit .274 with 24 home runs and 224 RBI in 732 games. In mid-season 1980, having lost his starting 3B job to Lenny Randle, Steve (Ontiveros's registered name) negotiated a contract with the Seibu Lions of the Nippon Professional Baseball league, and the Cubs sold him to Seibu. He played for Seibu from 1980 to 1985, hitting .312 with 82 home runs and 390 RBI.
