= Doug Capilla =

American baseball player (born 1952)

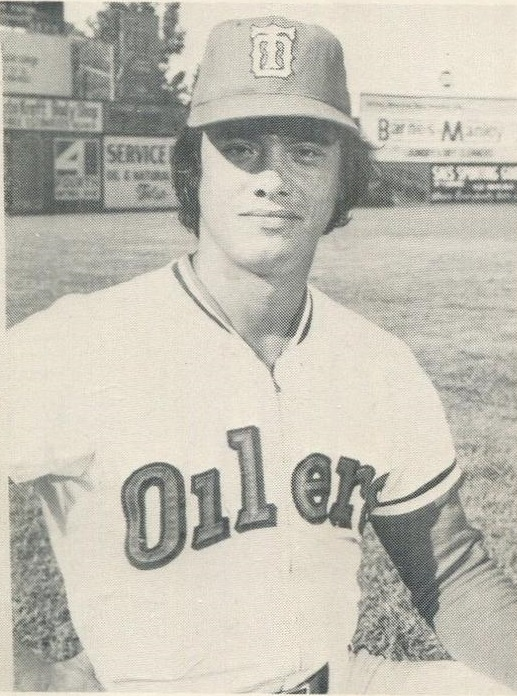
- Pitcher
- Born: January 7, 1952 (age 74); Honolulu, Hawaii, U.S.
- Batted: Left Threw: Left

MLB debut
- September 12, 1976, for the St. Louis Cardinals

Last MLB appearance
- September 29, 1981, for the Chicago Cubs

MLB statistics
- Win–loss record: 12–18
- Earned run average: 4.34
- Strikeouts: 178
- Stats at Baseball Reference

Teams
- St. Louis Cardinals (1976–1977); Cincinnati Reds (1977–1979); Chicago Cubs (1979–1981)

Douglas Edmund Capilla (born January 7, 1952) is an American former professional baseball player. Drafted by the San Francisco Giants in 1970, Capilla was a pitcher and played in the National League for six years with three teams. He appeared in a total of 136 games, starting as pitcher in 31 of them.

== Career ==
Capilla attended Westmont High School and West Valley College in Saratoga, California. He was drafted in the 25th round of the 1970 amateur draft and signed for the club on June 18 of the same year. He played in 1970 and from 1972 to 1973 in the Giants farm system until after the 1973 season, when the St. Louis Cardinals acquired Capilla from the Giants in the rule 5 draft.

After three more years in the minor leagues, Capilla made his debut on September 12, 1976. He pitched for the Cardinals in a total of 26 games until the trade deadline on June 15, 1977, when he was dealt to the Cincinnati Reds for Rawly Eastwick. After pitching in 33 games for the Reds he was traded to the Chicago Cubs on May 3, 1979. In December 1981 the Cubs traded Capilla back to the San Francisco Giants in exchange for Allen Ripley. On March 29, 1982, he was released by the Giants.

Capilla appeared in a total of 136 games in his six-year Major League career. He started in 31 games and posted a win–loss record of 12–18 with a career ERA of 4.34. His batting average over his career was .115. He pitched one complete game for the Reds in 1977.
