= Mike Sember =

American baseball player (born 1953)

- Third baseman
- Born: February 24, 1953 (age 72); Hammond, Indiana, U.S.
- Batted: Right Threw: Right

MLB debut
- August 18, 1977, for the Chicago Cubs

Last MLB appearance
- October 1, 1978, for the Chicago Cubs

MLB statistics
- Batting average: .286
- Home runs: 0
- Runs batted in: 0
- Stats at Baseball Reference

Teams
- Chicago Cubs (1977–1978)

Michael David Sember (born February 24, 1953) is an American former professional baseball player. Primarily a shortstop in minor league baseball, he appeared in 12 games in the Major Leagues in 1977–1978, most often as a late-inning defensive replacement as a third baseman, for the Chicago Cubs. He threw and batted right-handed, stood 6 feet (1.8 m) tall and weighed 185 pounds (84 kg).

Sember attended the University of Tulsa and was selected by the Cubs in the second round (31st overall) of the 1974 Major League Baseball draft. He struggled as a batsman, never exceeding a .251 batting average during his minor league career. Recalled from the Triple-A Wichita Aeros in August 1977, Sember debuted as a pinch hitter on August 18 and was called out on strikes facing Jerry Reuss of the Pittsburgh Pirates. Four days later, on August 22, Sember registered his first MLB hit, a single to center field off Charlie Williams of the San Francisco Giants.

During his second trial with the Cubs, in September 1978, he collected his second hit against veteran left-handed relief pitcher Darold Knowles of the Montreal Expos in his first return appearance on September 4. All told, Sember had seven at bats, with two hits, one base on balls and two runs scored in the Majors. He made one error in nine total chances in the field. Sember retired in 1979 after six professional seasons.
