= Jim Todd (baseball) =

American baseball player (1947–2025)

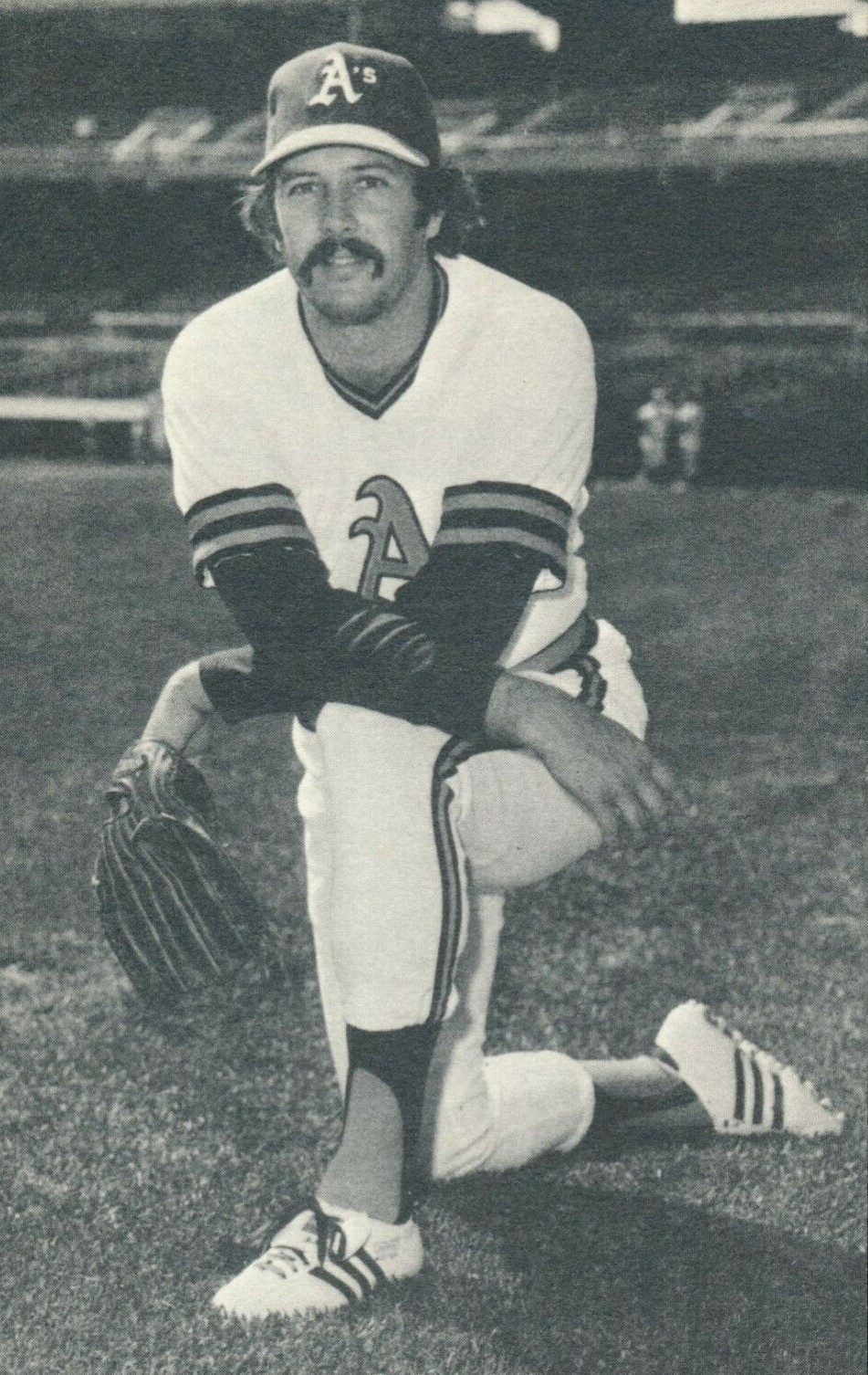
- Pitcher
- Born: September 21, 1947; Lancaster, Pennsylvania, U.S.
- Died: February 3, 2025 (aged 77); Parker, Colorado, U.S.
- Batted: Left Threw: Right

MLB debut
- April 29, 1974, for the Chicago Cubs

Last MLB appearance
- September 28, 1979, for the Oakland Athletics

MLB statistics
- Win–loss record: 25–23
- Earned run average: 4.23
- Strikeouts: 194
- Stats at Baseball Reference

Teams
- Chicago Cubs (1974); Oakland Athletics (1975–1976); Chicago Cubs (1977); Seattle Mariners (1978); Oakland Athletics (1979)

James Richard Todd, Jr. (September 21, 1947 – February 3, 2025) was an American professional baseball pitcher. He played in Major League Baseball (MLB) from 1974 to 1979 for the Chicago Cubs, Oakland Athletics, and Seattle Mariners.

== Biography ==
After pitching in college for Parsons College and Millersville State College, Todd was drafted by the Chicago Cubs in the 10th round of the 1969 Major League Baseball draft. He pitched in their organization through his major league debut in 1974, when he went 4–2 with three saves. Shortly before the 1975 season, Todd was traded to the Oakland Athletics for cash and player to be named later (Champ Summers).

In 1975 as the A's secondary closer behind future Hall-of Famer Rollie Fingers, Todd posted career bests in wins (8), saves (12), and ERA (2.29), and even received five votes on the MVP ballot for the AL West division champions. He pitched briefly in each of the three games of the ALCS, which Oakland lost to the Boston Red Sox.

The following season, Todd's performance slipped, setting a career high in losses with 8 and seeing his ERA rise by over a run and a half to 3.81. For the first time in his career, Todd also walked more than he struck out. His decline mirrored that of the team, which missed the playoffs for the first time since 1970. The following spring, Todd was shipped back to the Cubs for veteran pitcher Joe Coleman.

In 1977, Todd posted an ERA over 9 in 22 games giving up 66 baserunners in 30 2/3 innings. After July, Todd did not pitch in the majors and in October he was sent to the Seattle Mariners. Todd bounced back somewhat in 1978, but he still was giving up a lot of baserunners in 106 2/3 innings.

After being released by the Mariners in February 1979, he got one last shot with the team in which he'd had his greatest success, the A's. Oakland was in the midst of losing 108 games in 1979 and Todd contributed a 6.56 ERA, walking nearly twice as many batters as he struck out. He was released the following spring and never returned to the major leagues. He did pitch one season for the Phoenix Giants in 1980 before retiring.

Todd died in Parker, Colorado, on February 3, 2025, at the age of 77.
