= Craig Cacek =

American baseball player (born 1954)

- First baseman
- Born: September 10, 1954 (age 71); Los Angeles, California, U.S.
- Batted: Right Threw: Right

MLB debut
- June 18, 1977, for the Houston Astros

Last MLB appearance
- July 5, 1977, for the Houston Astros

MLB statistics
- Games played: 7
- At bats: 20
- Hits: 1
- Stats at Baseball Reference

Teams
- Houston Astros (1977)

Craig Thomas Cacek (born September 10, 1954) is an American former Major League Baseball first baseman who played seven games for the Houston Astros in 1977.
