= Mick Kelleher =

American baseball player and coach (born 1947)

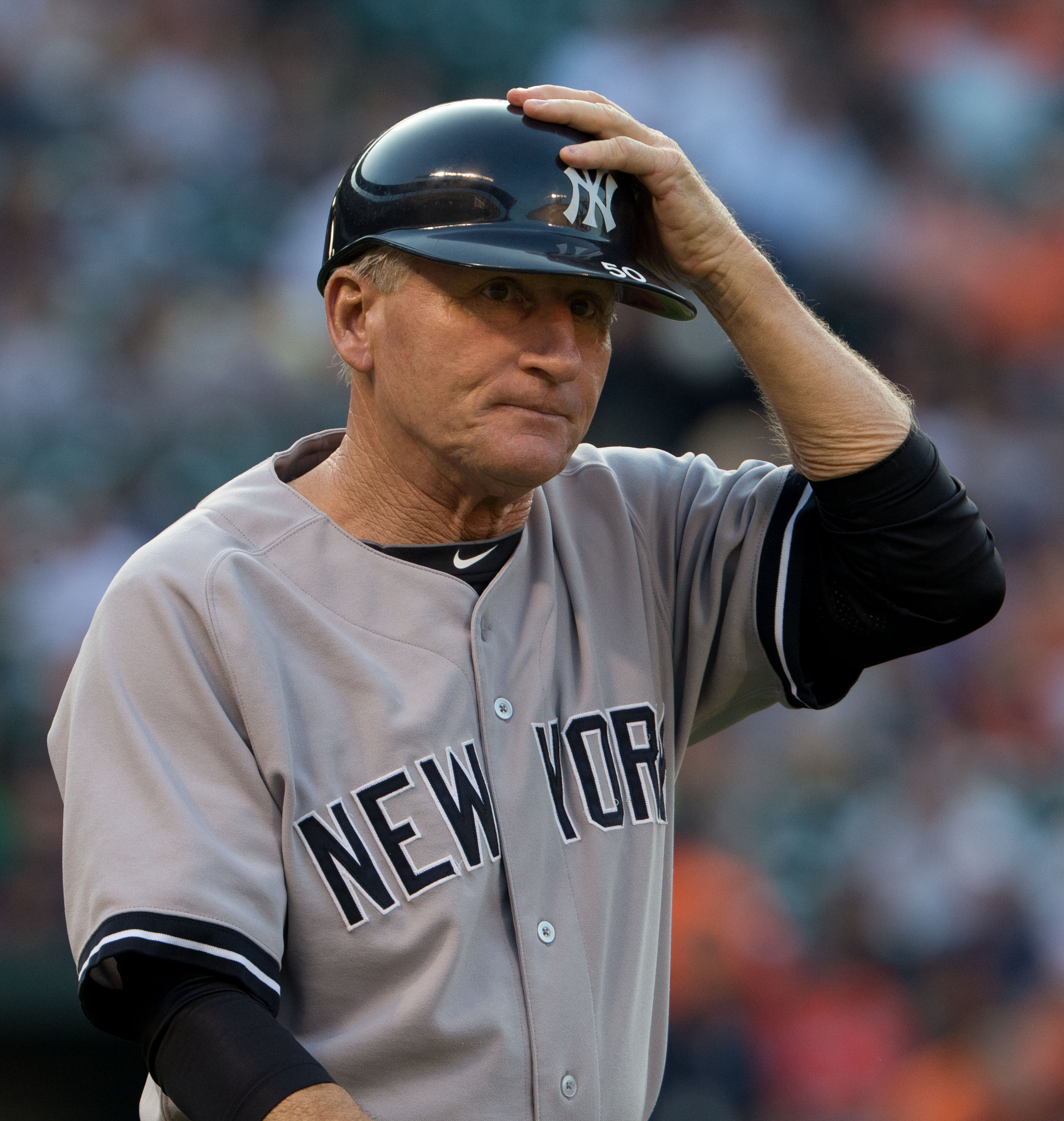
- Kelleher in 2013
- Infielder
- Born: July 25, 1947 (age 79); Seattle, Washington, U.S.
- Batted: Right Threw: Right

MLB debut
- September 1, 1972, for the St. Louis Cardinals

Last MLB appearance
- October 3, 1982, for the California Angels

MLB statistics
- Batting average: .213
- Hits: 230
- Runs batted in: 65
- Stats at Baseball Reference

Teams
- As player: St. Louis Cardinals (1972–1973); Houston Astros (1974); St. Louis Cardinals (1975); Chicago Cubs (1976–1980); Detroit Tigers (1981–1982); California Angels (1982); As coach: Pittsburgh Pirates (1986); Detroit Tigers (2003–2005); New York Yankees (2009–2014)

Career highlights and awards
- World Series champion (2009)

Michael Dennis Kelleher (born July 25, 1947) is an American former professional baseball player and coach. He played in Major League Baseball for the St. Louis Cardinals, Houston Astros, Chicago Cubs, Detroit Tigers, and California Angels. He coached for the Pittsburgh Pirates, Tigers, and the New York Yankees.

== Playing career ==
=== St. Louis Cardinals ===
Kelleher was taken out of the University of Puget Sound by the St. Louis Cardinals in the third round of the 1969 MLB Draft. As a minor leaguer with the Tulsa Oilers in 1972, Kelleher set an American Association record for shortstops with a .979 fielding percentage. He spent four years in the minors, stuck behind incumbent middle infielder Dal Maxvill. When Maxvill was traded on August 30, 1972, Kelleher was called up the following day and started the remainder of the season.

=== Houston Astros ===
Kelleher's contract was sold by the Cardinals to the Houston Astros on October 26, 1973. He spent most of the season in the minors with the Denver Bears, but had two stints with the big league club that year.

=== St. Louis Cardinals (second stint) ===
After the 1974 season, the Cardinals purchased him back from the Astros.

=== Chicago Cubs ===
On December 22, 1975, the Chicago Cubs acquired Kelleher for Vic Harris. His most notable moment as an active major-league player happened in the second inning of a 9–4 Cubs win over the San Diego Padres in the second game of a doubleheader at Wrigley Field on August 7, 1977. The 5–9, 170-pound Kelleher fought 6–6, 210-pound Dave Kingman who had successfully broken up a double-play attempt with a hard slide after being hit by a Steve Renko pitch. The ensuing bench-clearing brawl resulted in the ejections of both Kelleher and Kingman. The two became teammates the following season, after Kingman signed with the Cubs as a free agent.

=== Detroit Tigers ===
On April 1, 1981, the Detroit Tigers purchased Kelleher from the Cubs.

=== California Angels ===
On April 21, 1982, the California Angels purchased Kelleher from the Tigers. He was a member of the 1982 AL Western Division Champions, playing mostly shortstop and hitting .163 in 49 at-bats. He did not appear in the playoffs. After the season, Kelleher was released by the Angels.

Playing in 622 games, Kelleher recorded a career .213 batting average in 1,081 at bats. He is the most recently retired non-pitcher to have more than 1,000 at-bats and no home runs.

== Coaching career ==
Kelleher continued to work in major league baseball after his playing career ended, becoming a minor league coach and scout. He served as first base, base running, and infield coach for the Pittsburgh Pirates in 1986, but was dismissed after the season.

In 2001, Kelleher was a roving infield instructor with the New York Yankees. During this time, he worked with an 18-year-old Robinson Canó, who had just transitioned to second base. He served as first base coach for the Detroit Tigers from 2003 to 2005. He left after manager Alan Trammell was fired and replaced by Jim Leyland.

He was hired to serve as first base coach and infield coordinator for the major league team before the 2009 season. Kelleher worked extensively with Eduardo Nunez to improve his throws to first base and cut down on errors.

Kelleher spent six seasons with the team, and was a member of their coaching staff during the 2009 World Series. On October 10, 2014, the Yankees announced Kelleher would not return for the 2015 season. He subsequently retired from baseball on October 20.

== Personal life ==
Kelleher is an avid tennis fan. After retiring in 1982, he took up tennis and played in competitive leagues during the offseason. He also attends the US Open every year.

Sporting positions
Preceded by Tony Peña	New York Yankees First Base Coach; 2009–2014	Succeeded by Tony Peña
