= 1977 Major League Baseball season =

1977 MLB season
- League: American League (AL); National League (NL)
- Sport: Baseball
- Duration: Regular season: April 6 – October 2, 1977; Postseason: October 4–18, 1977
- Games: 162
- Teams: 26 (14 AL, 12 NL)
- TV partner(s): ABC, NBC

Draft
- Top draft pick: Harold Baines
- Picked by: Chicago White Sox

Regular season
- Season MVP: AL: Rod Carew (MIN); NL: George Foster (CIN)

Postseason
- AL champions: New York Yankees
- AL runners-up: Kansas City Royals
- NL champions: Los Angeles Dodgers
- NL runners-up: Philadelphia Phillies

World Series
- Champions: New York Yankees
- Runners-up: Los Angeles Dodgers
- World Series MVP: Reggie Jackson (NYY)

MLB seasons
- ← 1976 1978 →

Locations of teams for the 1977–1981 American League seasons
West East
Locations of teams for the 1977–1992 National League seasons
West East

The 1977 major league baseball season began on April 6 while the regular season ended on October 2. The postseason began on October 4. In the ninth iteration of this World Series matchup, the 74th World Series then began on October 11 and concluded on October 18 with the New York Yankees of the American League defeating the Los Angeles Dodgers of the National League, four games to two, to win their 21st title in franchise history, since their previous in 1962. Going into the season, the defending World Series champions were the Cincinnati Reds from the 1976 season.

The 48th All-Star Game was held on July 13 at Yankee Stadium in New York, New York, home of the New York Yankees. The National League won, 7–5, and was the sixth win in what would be an 11-game win streak that lasted until 1983.

The season saw the fourth round of expansion (and third for the American League) since the beginning of the expansion era in 1961. Expansion saw the return of the American League to Seattle, Washington following a seven-year hiatus (with the departure of the Seattle Pilots turned Milwaukee Brewers in 1970) and the expansion of the league into Canada, with the enfranchisement of the Seattle Mariners and Toronto Blue Jays, respectively, thus increasing the size of the league to 14 teams.

While the National League voted at the same time as the American League to expand over the 1976 off-season, the National League did not have the necessary unanimous results to expand. The league would not expand to 14 teams until 1993 when the Colorado Rockies and Florida Marlins were enfranchised.

== Schedule ==
The 1977 schedule consisted of 162 games for all 14 teams in the American League and 12 teams in the National League. For the first time since 1961, the two leagues saw different schedule formats. The American League was split into two seven-team divisions. Each team was scheduled to play 15 games against their six division rivals, totaling 90 games, and 10 games against five opponents and 11 games against two opponents, totaling 72 interdivision games. This format would be used until 1979. Meanwhile, the National League was split into two six-team divisions. Each team was scheduled to play 18 games against their five division rivals, totaling 90 games, and 12 games against six interdivision opponents, totaling 72 games. This continued the format put in place since the 1969 and would continue to be the format in use until 1993.

Opening Day took place on April 6, featuring four teams. The final day of the regular season was on October 2, featuring all 26 teams. The National League Championship Series took place between October 4 and October 8, while the American League Championship Series took place between October 5 and October 9. The World Series took place between October 11 and October 18.

== Rule changes ==
The 1977 season saw the following rule changes:

- While previously, an umpire was required to warn a pitcher who had intentionally hit a batter, the umpire is now able to warn both managers and both active pitchers simultaneously, while also ejecting the retaliatory pitcher immediately.
- Official scorers are now required to have within 24 hours after a game, decisions regarding judgement calls.
- If a pitcher throws ball four in an at bat and the throw is wide to the catcher outside the catcher's box, an intentional base on balls shall be scored.

== Teams ==
League	Division	Team	City	Ballpark	Capacity	Manager
American League	East	Baltimore Orioles	Baltimore, Maryland	Baltimore Memorial Stadium	53,208	Earl Weaver
American League	East	Boston Red Sox	Boston, Massachusetts	Fenway Park	33,368	Don Zimmer
American League	East	Cleveland Indians	Cleveland, Ohio	Cleveland Stadium	74,483	Frank Robinson
American League	East	Cleveland Indians	Cleveland, Ohio	Cleveland Stadium	74,483	Jeff Torborg
American League	East	Detroit Tigers	Detroit, Michigan	Tiger Stadium	52,806	Ralph Houk
American League	East	Milwaukee Brewers	Milwaukee, Wisconsin	Milwaukee County Stadium	53,192	Alex Grammas
American League	East	New York Yankees	New York, New York	Yankee Stadium	57,145	Billy Martin
American League	East	Toronto Blue Jays	Toronto, Ontario	Exhibition Stadium	38,522	Roy Hartsfield
American League	West	California Angels	Anaheim, California	Anaheim Stadium	43,500	Dick Williams
American League	West	California Angels	Anaheim, California	Anaheim Stadium	43,500	Norm Sherry
American League	West	Chicago White Sox	Chicago, Illinois	Comiskey Park	44,492	Bob Lemon
American League	West	Kansas City Royals	Kansas City, Missouri	Royals Stadium	40,613	Whitey Herzog
American League	West	Minnesota Twins	Bloomington, Minnesota	Metropolitan Stadium	45,919	Gene Mauch
American League	West	Oakland Athletics	Oakland, California	Oakland–Alameda County Coliseum	50,000	Jack McKeon
American League	West	Oakland Athletics	Oakland, California	Oakland–Alameda County Coliseum	50,000	Bobby Winkles
American League	West	Seattle Mariners	Seattle, Washington	Kingdome	59,059	Darrell Johnson
American League	West	Texas Rangers	Arlington, Texas	Arlington Stadium	35,649	Frank Lucchesi
American League	West	Texas Rangers	Arlington, Texas	Arlington Stadium	35,649	Eddie Stanky
American League	West	Texas Rangers	Arlington, Texas	Arlington Stadium	35,649	Connie Ryan
American League	West	Texas Rangers	Arlington, Texas	Arlington Stadium	35,649	Billy Hunter
National League	East	Chicago Cubs	Chicago, Illinois	Wrigley Field	37,702	Herman Franks
National League	East	Montreal Expos	Montreal, Quebec	Olympic Stadium	58,838	Dick Williams
National League	East	New York Mets	New York, New York	Shea Stadium	55,300	Joe Frazier
National League	East	New York Mets	New York, New York	Shea Stadium	55,300	Joe Torre
National League	East	Philadelphia Phillies	Philadelphia, Pennsylvania	Veterans Stadium	62,382	Danny Ozark
National League	East	Pittsburgh Pirates	Pittsburgh, Pennsylvania	Three Rivers Stadium	58,722	Chuck Tanner
National League	East	St. Louis Cardinals	St. Louis, Missouri	Civic Center Busch Memorial Stadium	53,138	Vern Rapp
National League	West	Atlanta Braves	Atlanta, Georgia	Atlanta–Fulton County Stadium	51,556	Dave Bristol
National League	West	Atlanta Braves	Atlanta, Georgia	Atlanta–Fulton County Stadium	51,556	Ted Turner
National League	West	Atlanta Braves	Atlanta, Georgia	Atlanta–Fulton County Stadium	51,556	Vern Benson
National League	West	Atlanta Braves	Atlanta, Georgia	Atlanta–Fulton County Stadium	51,556	Dave Bristol
National League	West	Cincinnati Reds	Cincinnati, Ohio	Riverfront Stadium	52,953	Sparky Anderson
National League	West	Houston Astros	Houston, Texas	Houston Astrodome	47,000	Bill Virdon
National League	West	Los Angeles Dodgers	Los Angeles, California	Dodger Stadium	56,000	Tommy Lasorda
National League	West	San Diego Padres	San Diego, California	San Diego Stadium	50,000	John McNamara
National League	West	San Diego Padres	San Diego, California	San Diego Stadium	50,000	Bob Skinner
National League	West	San Diego Padres	San Diego, California	San Diego Stadium	50,000	Alvin Dark
National League	West	San Francisco Giants	San Francisco, California	Candlestick Park	58,945	Joe Altobelli

== Standings ==
=== American League ===
AL East
Team	W	L	Pct.	GB	Home	Road
New York Yankees	100	62	.617	—	55‍–‍26	45‍–‍36
Baltimore Orioles	97	64	.602	2½	54‍–‍27	43‍–‍37
Boston Red Sox	97	64	.602	2½	51‍–‍29	46‍–‍35
Detroit Tigers	74	88	.457	26	39‍–‍42	35‍–‍46
Cleveland Indians	71	90	.441	28½	37‍–‍44	34‍–‍46
Milwaukee Brewers	67	95	.414	33	37‍–‍44	30‍–‍51
Toronto Blue Jays	54	107	.335	45½	25‍–‍55	29‍–‍52

AL West
Team	W	L	Pct.	GB	Home	Road
Kansas City Royals	102	60	.630	—	55‍–‍26	47‍–‍34
Texas Rangers	94	68	.580	8	44‍–‍37	50‍–‍31
Chicago White Sox	90	72	.556	12	48‍–‍33	42‍–‍39
Minnesota Twins	84	77	.522	17½	48‍–‍32	36‍–‍45
California Angels	74	88	.457	28	39‍–‍42	35‍–‍46
Seattle Mariners	64	98	.395	38	29‍–‍52	35‍–‍46
Oakland Athletics	63	98	.391	38½	35‍–‍46	28‍–‍52

=== National League ===
NL East
Team	W	L	Pct.	GB	Home	Road
Philadelphia Phillies	101	61	.623	—	60‍–‍21	41‍–‍40
Pittsburgh Pirates	96	66	.593	5	58‍–‍23	38‍–‍43
St. Louis Cardinals	83	79	.512	18	52‍–‍31	31‍–‍48
Chicago Cubs	81	81	.500	20	46‍–‍35	35‍–‍46
Montreal Expos	75	87	.463	26	38‍–‍43	37‍–‍44
New York Mets	64	98	.395	37	35‍–‍44	29‍–‍54

NL West
Team	W	L	Pct.	GB	Home	Road
Los Angeles Dodgers	98	64	.605	—	51‍–‍30	47‍–‍34
Cincinnati Reds	88	74	.543	10	48‍–‍33	40‍–‍41
Houston Astros	81	81	.500	17	46‍–‍35	35‍–‍46
San Francisco Giants	75	87	.463	23	38‍–‍43	37‍–‍44
San Diego Padres	69	93	.426	29	35‍–‍46	34‍–‍47
Atlanta Braves	61	101	.377	37	40‍–‍41	21‍–‍60

== Postseason ==
The postseason began on October 4 and ended on October 18 with the New York Yankees defeating the Los Angeles Dodgers in the 1977 World Series in six games.

=== Bracket ===
League Championship Series (ALCS, NLCS)
East	NY Yankees	3
West	Kansas City	2
East	Philadelphia	1
West	Los Angeles	3

World Series
AL	NY Yankees	4
NL	Los Angeles	2

== Managerial changes ==
=== Off-season ===
Team	Former Manager	New Manager
Chicago Cubs	Jim Marshall	Herman Franks
Chicago White Sox	Paul Richards	Bob Lemon
Montreal Expos	Charlie Fox	Dick Williams
Oakland Athletics	Chuck Tanner	Jack McKeon
Pittsburgh Pirates	Danny Murtaugh	Chuck Tanner
San Francisco Giants	Bill Rigney	Joe Altobelli
Seattle Mariners	Team enfranchised	Darrell Johnson
St. Louis Cardinals	Red Schoendienst	Vern Rapp
Toronto Blue Jays	Team enfranchised	Roy Hartsfield

=== In-season ===
Team	Former Manager	New Manager
Atlanta Braves	Dave Bristol	Ted Turner
Atlanta Braves	Ted Turner	Vern Benson
Atlanta Braves	Vern Benson	Dave Bristol
California Angels	Norm Sherry	Dave Garcia
Cleveland Indians	Frank Robinson	Jeff Torborg
New York Mets	Joe Frazier	Joe Torre
Oakland Athletics	Jack McKeon	Bobby Winkles
San Diego Padres	John McNamara	Bob Skinner
San Diego Padres	Bob Skinner	Alvin Dark
Texas Rangers	Frank Lucchesi	Eddie Stanky
Texas Rangers	Eddie Stanky	Connie Ryan
Texas Rangers	Connie Ryan	Billy Hunter

== League leaders ==
=== American League ===
Hitting leaders
Stat	Player	Total
AVG	Rod Carew (MIN)	.388
OPS	Rod Carew (MIN)	1.019
HR	Jim Rice (BOS)	39
RBI	Larry Hisle (MIN)	119
R	Rod Carew (MIN)	128
H	Rod Carew (MIN)	239
SB	Freddie Patek (KC)	53

Pitching leaders
Stat	Player	Total
W	Dave Goltz (MIN); Dennis Leonard (KC); Jim Palmer (BAL)	20
L	Vida Blue (OAK); Wayne Garland (CLE); Rick Langford (OAK)	19
ERA	Frank Tanana (CAL)	2.54
K	Nolan Ryan (CAL)	341
IP	Jim Palmer (BAL)	319.0
SV	Bill Campbell (BOS)	31
WHIP	Bert Blyleven (TEX)	1.065

=== National League ===
Hitting leaders
Stat	Player	Total
AVG	Dave Parker (PIT)	.338
OPS	George Foster (CIN)	1.013
HR	George Foster (CIN)	52
RBI	George Foster (CIN)	149
R	George Foster (CIN)	124
H	Dave Parker (PIT)	215
SB	Frank Taveras (PIT)	70

Pitching leaders
Stat	Player	Total
W	Steve Carlton (PHI)	23
L	Jerry Koosman (NYM); Phil Niekro (ATL)	20
ERA	John Candelaria (PIT)	2.34
K	Phil Niekro (ATL)	262
IP	Phil Niekro (ATL)	330.1
SV	Rollie Fingers (SD)	35
WHIP	Tom Seaver (CIN/NYM)	1.014

== Milestones ==
=== Batters ===
==== Cycles ====
- Bob Watson (HOU):
  - Watson hit for his first cycle and third in franchise history, on June 24 against the San Francisco Giants.
- John Mayberry (KC):
  - Mayberry hit for his first cycle and second in franchise history, on August against the Chicago White Sox.
- Jack Brohamer (CWS):
  - Brohamer hit for his first cycle and second in franchise history, on September 24 against the Seattle Mariners.

==== Other batting accomplishments ====
- Willie McCovey (SF):
  - Breaks the National League grand slam record when he hits his 17th career grand slam against the Cincinnati Reds on June 27.
- Willie Stargell (PIT):
  - Became the 17th player in Major League history to hit 400 home runs in the fifth inning against the St. Louis Cardinals on June 29.
  - Sets the National League grand slam record when he hits his 18th career grand slam against the Montreal Expos on August 1.
- Toby Harrah / Bump Wills (TEX):
  - Become the first players in Major League history to hit back-to-back inside the park home runs in a game against the New York Yankees on August 27.
- Lou Brock (STL):
  - Breaks the modern major league stolen base record when he steals his 898th career stolen base in a game against the Pittsburgh Pirates on September 7, breaking the record previously set by Ty Cobb in 1928. Due to historical discrepancies in recording stolen bases, Brock breaking Cobb's record is celebrated when he stole his 893rd career stolen base, in a game against the San Diego Padres on August 29.
  - Recorded his 900th career stolen base in the fifth inning against the New York Mets in game one of a doubleheader on September 30. He became the second player to reach this mark.

=== Pitchers ===
==== No-Hitters ====
- Jim Colborn (KC):
  - Colborn threw his first career no-hitter and third no-hitter in franchise history, by defeating the Texas Rangers 6–0 on May 14. He walked one, hit one by pitch, and struck out six.
- Dennis Eckersley (CLE):
  - Eckersley threw his first career no-hitter and 13th no-hitter in franchise history, by defeating the California Angels 1–0 on May 30. He walked one and struck out 12.
- Bert Blyleven (TEX):
  - Blyleven threw his first career no-hitter and second no-hitter in franchise history, by defeating the California Angels 6–0 on September 22. He walked one and struck out seven.

==== Other pitching accomplishments ====
- Wilbur Wood (CWS)
  - Tied a Major League record by becoming the fourth pitcher to hit three consecutive batters by pitch, the first since 1974, in a game against the California Angels on September 10.

=== Miscellaneous ===
- Dave Kingman (NYY/CAL/SD/NYM):
  - Became the only player in major league history to play in all four divisions in one season when the California Angels trade him to the New York Yankees for pitcher Randy Stein. He previously started the season with the New York Mets, before being traded to the San Diego Padres on June 15 for Paul Siebert and Bobby Valentine. He was selected off waivers by the Angels on September 6.

== Awards and honors ==
=== Regular season ===
Baseball Writers' Association of America Awards
BBWAA Award	National League	American League
Rookie of the Year	Andre Dawson (MON)	Eddie Murray (BAL)
Cy Young Award	Steve Carlton (PHI)	Sparky Lyle (NYY)
Most Valuable Player	George Foster (CIN)	Rod Carew (MIN)
Babe Ruth Award (World Series MVP)	—	Reggie Jackson (NYY)
Gold Glove Awards
Position	National League	American League
Pitcher	Jim Kaat (PHI)	Jim Palmer (BAL)
Catcher	Johnny Bench (CIN)	Jim Sundberg (TEX)
1st Base	Steve Garvey (LAD)	Jim Spencer (CWS)
2nd Base	Joe Morgan (CIN)	Frank White (KC)
3rd Base	Mike Schmidt (PHI)	Graig Nettles (NYY)
Shortstop	Dave Concepción (CIN)	Mark Belanger (BAL)
Outfield	César Gerónimo (CIN)	Juan Beníquez (TEX)
Outfield	Garry Maddox (PHI)	Al Cowens (KC)
Outfield	Dave Parker (PIT)	Carl Yastrzemski (BOS)

=== Other awards ===
- Outstanding Designated Hitter Award: Jim Rice (BOS)
- Roberto Clemente Award (Humanitarian): Rod Carew (MIN)
- Hutch Award: Willie McCovey (SF)
- National League Championship Series Most Valuable Player Award: Dusty Baker (LAD)
- Rolaids Relief Man Award: Rollie Fingers (SD, National); Bill Campbell (BOS, American)
- Sport Magazine's World Series Most Valuable Player Award: Reggie Jackson (NYY)

The Sporting News Awards
Award	National League	American League
Player of the Year	—	Rod Carew (MIN)
Pitcher of the Year	Steve Carlton (PHI)	Nolan Ryan (CAL)
Fireman of the Year (Relief pitcher)	Rollie Fingers (SD)	Bill Campbell (BOS)
Rookie Player of the Year	Andre Dawson (MON)	Mitchell Page (OAK)
Rookie Pitcher of the Year	Bob Owchinko (SD)	Dave Rozema (DET)
Comeback Player of the Year	Willie McCovey (SF)	Eric Soderholm (CWS)
Manager of the Year	—	Earl Weaver (BAL)
Executive of the Year	—	Bill Veeck (CWS)

=== Monthly awards ===
==== Player of the Month ====
Month	National League	American League
April	Ron Cey (LAD)	Otto Vélez (TOR)
May	Ken Reitz (STL)	Frank Tanana (CAL)
June	George Foster (CIN)	Rod Carew (MIN)
July	Greg Luzinski (PHI)	Jim Rice (BOS)
August	George Foster (CIN)	Graig Nettles (NYY)
September	César Cedeño (HOU)	Rod Carew (MIN)

==== Pitcher of the Month ====
Month	National League
April	Tom Seaver (NYM)
May	Bruce Sutter (CHC)
June	Rick Reuschel (CHC)
July	Rick Reuschel (CHC)
August	Tom Seaver (CIN)
September	Larry Christenson (PHI)

=== Baseball Hall of Fame ===
- Ernie Banks
- Martín Dihigo
- John Henry Lloyd
- Amos Rusie
- Joe Sewell
- Al López (manager)

== Home field attendance ==
Team name	Wins	%±	Home attendance	%±	Per game
Los Angeles Dodgers	98	6.5%	2,955,087	23.8%	36,483
Philadelphia Phillies	101	0.0%	2,700,070	8.9%	33,334
Cincinnati Reds	88	−13.7%	2,519,670	−4.2%	31,107
New York Yankees	100	3.1%	2,103,092	4.5%	25,964
Boston Red Sox	97	16.9%	2,074,549	9.4%	25,932
Kansas City Royals	102	13.3%	1,852,603	10.3%	22,872
Toronto Blue Jays	54		1,701,052		21,263
St. Louis Cardinals	83	15.3%	1,659,287	37.5%	19,991
Chicago White Sox	90	40.6%	1,657,135	81.1%	20,458
Chicago Cubs	81	8.0%	1,439,834	40.3%	17,776
Montreal Expos	75	36.4%	1,433,757	121.7%	17,701
California Angels	74	−2.6%	1,432,633	42.3%	17,687
San Diego Padres	69	−5.5%	1,376,269	−5.6%	16,991
Detroit Tigers	74	0.0%	1,359,856	−7.3%	16,788
Seattle Mariners	64		1,338,511		16,525
Texas Rangers	94	23.7%	1,250,722	7.4%	15,441
Pittsburgh Pirates	96	4.3%	1,237,349	20.6%	15,276
Baltimore Orioles	97	10.2%	1,195,769	13.0%	14,763
Minnesota Twins	84	−1.2%	1,162,727	62.5%	14,534
Milwaukee Brewers	67	1.5%	1,114,938	10.2%	13,765
Houston Astros	81	1.3%	1,109,560	25.2%	13,698
New York Mets	64	−25.6%	1,066,825	−27.4%	13,504
Cleveland Indians	71	−12.3%	900,365	−5.1%	11,116
Atlanta Braves	61	−12.9%	872,464	6.6%	10,771
San Francisco Giants	75	1.4%	700,056	11.7%	8,643
Oakland Athletics	63	−27.6%	495,599	−36.5%	6,119

== Venues ==
The 1977 season saw two new teams in the American League, and with it, two new venues:

- The Seattle Mariners played at the Kingdome, where they would play for 23 seasons through the middle of 1999.
- The Toronto Blue Jays played at Exhibition Stadium, where they would play for 13 seasons through the middle of 1989.

The Montreal Expos leave Jarry Park Stadium (where they played for eight seasons) and opened Olympic Stadium, where they would go on to play for 28 seasons through 2004.

== Media ==
=== Television ===
ABC aired Monday Night Baseball and the World Series. NBC televised the weekend Game of the Week, the All-Star Game, and both League Championship Series.

== Retired numbers ==
- Danny Murtaugh had his No. 40 retired by the Pittsburgh Pirates on April 7. This was the fifth number retired by the team.
- Hank Aaron had his No. 44 retired by the Atlanta Braves on April 15. This was the third number retired by the team.
- Walter Alston had his No. 24 retired by the Los Angeles Dodgers on June 5. This was the fourth number retired by the team.

== See also ==
- 1977 in baseball (Events, Movies, Births, Deaths)
- 1977 Nippon Professional Baseball season
