= 1978 Atlanta Braves season =

1978 Atlanta Braves
- League: National League
- Division: West
- Ballpark: Atlanta–Fulton County Stadium
- City: Atlanta
- Record: 69–93 (.426)
- Divisional place: 6th
- Owners: Ted Turner
- General managers: Bill Lucas
- Managers: Bobby Cox
- Television: WTCG
- Radio: WSB (Ernie Johnson, Pete Van Wieren, Skip Caray)

The 1978 Atlanta Braves season was the 108th season for the franchise and their 13th in Atlanta.

== Offseason ==
- December 8, 1977: Willie Montañez was traded by the Braves to the New York Mets as part of a four-team trade. Adrian Devine, Tommy Boggs, and Eddie Miller were traded by the Texas Rangers to the Braves. The Rangers sent Bert Blyleven to the Pittsburgh Pirates, and the Mets sent John Milner to the Pirates. The Rangers sent Tom Grieve and a player to be named later to the Mets. The Pirates sent Al Oliver and Nelson Norman to the Rangers, and the Mets sent Jon Matlack to the Rangers. The Rangers completed the trade by sending Ken Henderson to the Mets on March 15, 1978.
- March 30, 1978: Buzz Capra was released by the Atlanta Braves.

=== Managerial turnover: Bobby Cox begins his first term ===
In May 1977, owner Ted Turner had stunned baseball when—in the midst of a 16-game losing streak—he furloughed manager Dave Bristol, sent him on a ten-day scouting trip, and took the reins of the team himself; on May 11, he donned uniform #27 and skippered the Braves to their 17th straight loss. National League president Chub Feeney and Commissioner of Baseball Bowie Kuhn then stepped in and forbade the owner from managing his own ballclub, citing MLB rules that apparently took effect after Connie Mack retired as owner-manager of the Philadelphia Athletics in 1950. Veteran coach Vern Benson ran the Braves the following night (and broke the losing skein), and then Bristol was rehired for the balance of the season.

However, that chaotic season was followed by one of the most important events in Braves' history: the hiring of Bobby Cox, briefly a Braves' farm system player, as manager for 1978. Cox was then a 36-year-old, relatively unknown former third baseman who had spent the previous ten seasons in the New York Yankees' organization, including six years (1971–1976) as a highly successful minor league manager and one season as the first-base coach on the Yankees' 1977 world championship team. Cox would spend four seasons, 1978–1981, during this first term in the Braves' dugout. While his first two years produced frustrating, last-place seasons in the National League West, by Cox' third year, 1980, the Braves posted a winning (81–80) mark and rose to fourth place in their division. Attendance began to climb, with the team exceeding the one-million mark at Atlanta–Fulton County Stadium for the first time since 1971. But the strike-shortened 1981 season was a major disappointment; the Braves fell to 50–56, and Cox was fired. He went 266–323 (.452) during his inaugural tenure.

His successor, former New York Mets skipper Joe Torre, would lead the Braves to the 1982 National League West Division championship. Cox would land with the Toronto Blue Jays as their 1982 manager. The Jays were then a five-year-old expansion team that had never escaped the basement of the American League East Division, nor won more than 67 games in a season. By Cox' second season, the Blue Jays broke the .500 mark, and by his fourth, in 1985, they would win 99 games and the AL East title. Meanwhile, the Braves' front office was in flux and owner Turner was seeking a strong hand to take over the team's baseball operations as general manager. He lured Cox back to Atlanta with a multi-year contract. And, although the team struggled desperately on the field in the late 1980s, general manager Cox was assembling a base of talent that, when he returned to the dugout to manage the Braves for his second term, on June 23, 1990, would ignite a series of first-place divisional teams (for 15 out of 16 straight seasons) and five National League pennant winners (as well as the 1995 World Series title) that would earn Cox a place in the Baseball Hall of Fame by his 2010 retirement.

== Regular season ==
- May 1, 1978: In a game versus the New York Mets, Braves manager Bobby Cox was ejected from a game for the first time in his career. Cox would go on to set the record for most ejections by a manager.
- June 16, 1978: Bob Horner, freshly signed by the Braves off the Arizona State University campus, hits a home run off the Pittsburgh Pirates' Bert Blyleven in his first professional game. Horner would go on to hit 23 home runs, leading all National League third basemen, and win the National League Rookie of the Year award.

=== Season standings ===
NL West
Team	W	L	Pct.	GB	Home	Road
Los Angeles Dodgers	95	67	.586	—	54‍–‍27	41‍–‍40
Cincinnati Reds	92	69	.571	2½	49‍–‍31	43‍–‍38
San Francisco Giants	89	73	.549	6	50‍–‍31	39‍–‍42
San Diego Padres	84	78	.519	11	50‍–‍31	34‍–‍47
Houston Astros	74	88	.457	21	50‍–‍31	24‍–‍57
Atlanta Braves	69	93	.426	26	39‍–‍42	30‍–‍51

=== Record vs. opponents ===
1978 National League record Sources:
Team	ATL	CHC	CIN	HOU	LAD	MON	NYM	PHI	PIT	SD	SF	STL
Atlanta	—	5–7	6–12	8–10	5–13	5–7	6–6	8–4	2–10	8–10	11–7	5–7
Chicago	7–5	—	7–5	6–6	4–8	7–11	11–7	4–14	7–11	7–5	4–8	15–3
Cincinnati	12–6	5–7	—	11–7	9–9	8–4	7–5	7–5	4–7	9–9	12–6	8–4
Houston	10–8	6–6	7–11	—	7–11	6–6	7–5	6–6	4–8	8–10	6–12	7–5
Los Angeles	13–5	8–4	9–9	11–7	—	8–4	7–5	7–5	7–5	9–9	11–7	5–7
Montreal	7–5	11–7	4–8	6–6	4–8	—	8–10	9–9	7–11	6–6	5–7	9–9
New York	6–6	7–11	5–7	5–7	5–7	10–8	—	6–12	7–11	5–7	3–9	7–11
Philadelphia	4-8	14–4	5–7	6–6	5–7	9–9	12–6	—	11–7	8–4	6–6	10–8
Pittsburgh	10–2	11–7	7–4	8–4	5–7	11–7	11–7	7–11	—	5–7	4–8	9–9
San Diego	10–8	5–7	9–9	10–8	9–9	6–6	7–5	4–8	7–5	—	8–10	9–3
San Francisco	7–11	8–4	6–12	12–6	7–11	7–5	9–3	6–6	8–4	10–8	—	9–3
St. Louis	7–5	3–15	4–8	5–7	7–5	9–9	11–7	8–10	9–9	3–9	3–9	—

=== Notable transactions ===
- May 16, 1978: Jim Bouton was signed as a free agent by the Braves.
- September 22, 1978: Cito Gaston was purchased from the Braves by the Pittsburgh Pirates.

=== Roster ===
1978 Atlanta Braves
Roster
Pitchers: 50 Tommy Boggs; 56 Jim Bouton; 33 Rick Camp; 32 Dave Campbell; 39 Mike Davey; 28 Adrian Devine; 45 Jamie Easterly; 26 Gene Garber; 49 Preston Hanna; 42 Frank LaCorte; 31 Max León; 24 Mickey Mahler; 27 Larry McWilliams; 35 Phil Niekro; 40 Dick Ruthven; 48 Craig Skok; 37 Eddie Solomon; 34 Duane Theiss	Catchers: 20 Bruce Benedict; 11 Joe Nolan; 4 Biff Pocoroba; Infielders: 25 Bob Beall; 10 Rob Belloir; 15 Darrel Chaney; 19 Rod Gilbreath; 5 Bob Horner; 17 Glenn Hubbard; 12 Jerry Maddox; 3 Dale Murphy; 12 Tom Paciorek; 9 Pat Rockett; 1 Jerry Royster; 16 Chico Ruiz; 12 Hank Small	Outfielders: 30 Brian Asselstine; 2 Barry Bonnell; 7 Jeff Burroughs; 43 Cito Gaston; 36 Gary Matthews; 29 Eddie Miller; 22 Rowland Office; 18 Larry Whisenton	Manager: 6 Bobby Cox; Coaches: 48 Cloyd Boyer; 14 Tom Burgess; 8 Chris Cannizzaro; 23 Pete Ward

== Player stats ==
=== Batting ===
==== Starters by position ====
Note: Pos = Position; G = Games played; AB = At bats; H = Hits; Avg. = Batting average; HR = Home runs; RBI = Runs batted in

Pos	Player	G	AB	H	Avg.	HR	RBI
C	Biff Pocoroba	92	289	70	.242	6	34
1B	Dale Murphy	151	530	120	.226	23	79
2B	Jerry Royster	140	529	137	.259	2	35
SS	Darrel Chaney	89	245	55	.224	3	20
3B	Bob Horner	89	323	86	.266	23	63
LF	Jeff Burroughs	153	488	147	.301	23	77
CF	Rowland Office	146	404	101	.250	9	40
RF	Gary Matthews	129	474	135	.285	18	62

==== Other batters ====
Note: G = Games played; AB = At bats; H = Hits; Avg. = Batting average; HR = Home runs; RBI = Runs batted in

Player	G	AB	H	Avg.	HR	RBI
Rod Gilbreath	116	326	80	.245	3	31
Barry Bonnell	117	304	73	.240	1	16
Joe Nolan	95	213	49	.230	4	22
Bob Beall	108	185	45	.243	1	16
Glenn Hubbard	44	163	42	.258	2	13
Pat Rockett	55	142	20	.141	0	4
Cito Gaston	60	118	27	.229	1	9
Brian Asselstine	39	103	28	.272	2	13
Bruce Benedict	22	52	13	.250	0	1
Chico Ruiz	18	46	13	.283	0	2
Eddie Miller	6	21	3	.143	0	2
Larry Whisenton	6	16	3	.188	0	2
Jerry Maddox	7	14	3	.214	0	1
Tom Paciorek	5	9	3	.333	0	0
Hank Small	1	4	0	.000	0	0
Rob Belloir	2	1	1	1.000	0	0

=== Pitching ===
= Indicates league leader

==== Starting pitchers ====
Note: G = Games pitched; IP = Innings pitched; W = Wins; L = Losses; ERA = Earned run average; SO = Strikeouts

Player	G	IP	W	L	ERA	SO
Phil Niekro	44	334.1	19	18	2.88	248
Preston Hanna	29	140.1	7	13	5.13	90
Larry McWilliams	15	99.1	9	3	2.81	42
Dick Ruthven	13	81.0	2	6	4.11	45
Jim Bouton	5	29.0	1	3	4.97	10

==== Other pitchers ====
Note: G = Games pitched; IP = Innings pitched; W = Wins; L = Losses; ERA = Earned run average; SO = Strikeouts

Player	G	IP	W	L	ERA	SO
Mickey Mahler	34	134.2	4	11	4.68	92
Eddie Solomon	37	106.0	4	6	4.08	64
Adrian Devine	31	65.1	5	4	5.92	26
Tommy Boggs	16	59.0	2	8	6.71	21
Frank LaCorte	2	14.2	0	1	3.68	7

==== Relief pitchers ====
Note: G = Games pitched; W = Wins; L = Losses; SV = Saves; ERA = Earned run average; SO = Strikeouts

Player	G	W	L	SV	ERA	SO
Gene Garber	43	4	4	22	2.53	61
Dave Campbell	53	4	4	1	4.80	45
Craig Skok	43	3	2	2	4.35	28
Rick Camp	42	2	4	0	3.75	23
Jamie Easterly	37	3	6	1	5.65	42
Max León	5	0	0	0	6.35	1
Duane Theiss	3	0	0	0	1.42	3
Mike Davey	3	0	0	0	0.00	0

== Farm system ==
Level	Team	League	Manager
AAA	Richmond Braves	International League	Tommie Aaron
AA	Savannah Braves	Southern League	Bobby Dews
A	Greenwood Braves	Western Carolinas League	Al Gallagher
Rookie	Kingsport Braves	Appalachian League	Eddie Haas
Rookie	GCL Braves	Gulf Coast League	Pedro González

LEAGUE CHAMPIONS: Richmond, Greenwood

== Awards and honors ==
=== League leaders ===
- Phil Niekro, National League leader, Losses
