= 1977 Atlanta Braves season =

1977 Atlanta Braves
- League: National League
- Division: West
- Ballpark: Atlanta–Fulton County Stadium
- City: Atlanta
- Record: 61–101 (.377)
- Divisional place: 6th
- Owners: Ted Turner
- General managers: Bill Lucas
- Managers: Dave Bristol (games 1–29, 32–162); Ted Turner (game 30); Vern Benson (game 31)
- Television: WTCG (Ernie Johnson, Pete Van Wieren, Skip Caray)
- Radio: WSB (Ernie Johnson, Pete Van Wieren)

The 1977 Atlanta Braves season was the 107th season for the franchise and their 12th in Atlanta. The team finished in last place in the six-team National League West with a record of 61–101, 37 games behind the Los Angeles Dodgers. The Braves hit a major league-leading seven grand slams.

All Braves home and away games were broadcast on WTCG-TV which during the offseason, under its owner Ted Turner, became the pioneer superstation in the United States and thus making the Braves the first MLB team to have its games telecast to millions of television viewers around the country aside from the national broadcasts on ABC and NBC which had been the case before the team's opening series of the season.

The 1977 Braves had the fewest Wins Above Replacement (WAR) of any team in a single season in major league history, at -10.0.

== Offseason ==
- November 17, 1976: Gary Matthews was signed by the Braves as a free agent.
- December 9, 1976: Carl Morton, Adrian Devine, Ken Henderson, Dave May, Roger Moret, and $250,000 were traded by the Braves to the Texas Rangers for Jeff Burroughs.

== Regular season ==
=== Turner's one-day reign as manager ===
Midway through the 1977 season, with the Braves mired in a 16-game losing streak, owner Ted Turner sent Dave Bristol on a 10-day "scouting trip" and took over as his own manager. This only lasted for one game (a 2–1 loss to the Pittsburgh Pirates) before National League president Chub Feeney ordered Turner to give up the reins, citing major league rules which forbid managers or players from owning stock in a team. After the Braves broke the skid under third-base coach Vern Benson, Bristol—who had spent the time at his offseason home in Andrews, North Carolina—was given his old job back for the remainder of the season.

=== Notable events ===
- September 15, 1977 - Dale Murphy hits two home runs in an 8–7 win over the San Diego Padres, the first home runs of his major league career.

=== Season standings ===
NL West
Team	W	L	Pct.	GB	Home	Road
Los Angeles Dodgers	98	64	.605	—	51‍–‍30	47‍–‍34
Cincinnati Reds	88	74	.543	10	48‍–‍33	40‍–‍41
Houston Astros	81	81	.500	17	46‍–‍35	35‍–‍46
San Francisco Giants	75	87	.463	23	38‍–‍43	37‍–‍44
San Diego Padres	69	93	.426	29	35‍–‍46	34‍–‍47
Atlanta Braves	61	101	.377	37	40‍–‍41	21‍–‍60

=== Record vs. opponents ===
1977 National League record Sources:
Team	ATL	CHC	CIN	HOU	LAD	MON	NYM	PHI	PIT	SD	SF	STL
Atlanta	—	5–7	4–14	9–9	5–13	6–6	7–5	2–10	3–9	11–7	8–10	1–11
Chicago	7–5	—	7–5	6–6	6–6	10–8	9–9	6–12	7–11	7–5	9–3	7–11
Cincinnati	14–4	5–7	—	5–13	10–8	7–5	10–2	8–4	3–9	11–7	10–8	5–7
Houston	9–9	6–6	13–5	—	9–9	8–4	6–6	4–8	4–8	8–10	9–9	5–7
Los Angeles	13–5	6–6	8–10	9–9	—	7–5	8–4	6–6	9–3	12–6	14–4	6–6
Montreal	6–6	8–10	5–7	4–8	5–7	—	10–8	7–11	7–11	5–7	6–6	12–6
New York	5–7	9–9	2–10	6–6	4–8	8–10	—	5–13	4–14	6–6	7–5	8–10
Philadelphia	10-2	12–6	4–8	8–4	6–6	11–7	13–5	—	8–10	9–3	9–3	11–7
Pittsburgh	9–3	11–7	9–3	8–4	3–9	11–7	14–4	10–8	—	10–2	2–10	9–9
San Diego	7–11	5–7	7–11	10–8	6–12	7–5	6–6	3–9	2–10	—	8–10	8–4
San Francisco	10–8	3–9	8–10	9–9	4–14	6–6	5–7	3–9	10–2	10–8	—	7–5
St. Louis	11–1	11–7	7–5	7–5	6–6	6–12	10–8	7–11	9–9	4–8	5–7	—

=== Opening Day starters ===
- Jeff Burroughs
- Vic Correll
- Rod Gilbreath
- Gary Matthews
- Willie Montañez
- Rowland Office
- Pat Rockett
- Jerry Royster
- Dick Ruthven

=== Notable transactions ===
- April 30, 1977: Mike Marshall was purchased from the Braves by the Texas Rangers.
- June 7, 1977: Larry Owen was drafted by the Braves in the 17th round of the 1977 Major League Baseball draft.

=== Roster ===
1977 Atlanta Braves
Roster
Pitchers: 37 Mike Beard; 30 Larry Bradford; 33 Rick Camp; 32 Dave Campbell; 47 Buzz Capra; 42 Don Collins; 39 Mike Davey; 45 Jamie Easterly; 49 Preston Hanna; 50 Steve Hargan; 50 Bob Johnson; 38 Steve Kline; 26 Frank LaCorte; 31 Max León; 24 Mickey Mahler; 20 Mike Marshall; 37,48 Joey McLaughlin; 17,27 Andy Messersmith; 35 Phil Niekro; 40 Dick Ruthven; 37 Eddie Solomon; 34 Duane Theiss	Catchers: 29 Vic Correll; 3 Dale Murphy; 11 Joe Nolan; 4 Biff Pocoroba; Infielders: 10 Rob Belloir; 15 Darrel Chaney; 19 Rod Gilbreath; 25 Willie Montañez; 14 Junior Moore; 12 Tom Paciorek; 16 Craig Robinson; 9 Pat Rockett; 13 Jerry Royster	Outfielders: 30 Brian Asselstine; 2 Barry Bonnell; 7 Jeff Burroughs; 43 Cito Gaston; 36 Gary Matthews; 22 Rowland Office; Other batters: 20 Larry Whisenton	Manager: 8 Vern Benson; 1 Dave Bristol; 27 Ted Turner; Coaches: 8 Vern Benson; 6 Chris Cannizzaro; 5 Eddie Haas; 23 Johnny Sain

== Player stats ==
= Indicates team leader

=== Batting ===
==== Starters by position ====
Note: Pos = Position; G = Games played; AB = At bats; H = Hits; Avg. = Batting average; HR = Home runs; RBI = Runs batted in; SB = Stolen bases

Pos	Player	G	AB	H	Avg.	HR	RBI	SB
C	Biff Pocoroba	113	321	93	.290	8	44	3
1B	Willie Montañez	136	544	156	.287	20	68	1
2B	Rod Gilbreath	128	407	99	.243	8	43	3
3B	Junior Moore	112	361	94	.260	5	34	4
SS	Pat Rockett	93	264	67	.254	1	24	1
LF	Gary Matthews	148	555	157	.283	17	64	22
CF	Rowland Office	124	428	103	.241	5	39	2
RF	Jeff Burroughs	154	579	157	.271	41	114	4

==== Other batters ====
Note: G = Games played; AB = At bats; H = Hits; Avg. = Batting average; HR = Home runs; RBI = Runs batted in; SB = Stolen bases

Player	G	AB	H	Avg.	HR	RBI	SB
Jerry Royster	140	445	96	.216	6	28	28
Barry Bonnell	100	360	108	.300	1	45	7
Darrel Chaney	74	209	42	.201	3	15	0
Tom Paciorek	72	155	37	.239	3	15	1
Vic Correll	54	144	30	.208	7	16	2
Brian Asselstine	83	124	26	.210	4	17	1
Cito Gaston	56	85	23	.271	3	21	1
Joe Nolan	62	82	23	.280	3	9	1
Dale Murphy	18	76	24	.316	2	14	0
Craig Robinson	27	29	6	.207	0	1	0
Larry Whisenton	4	4	1	.250	0	1	0
Rob Belloir	6	1	0	.000	0	0	0

=== Pitching ===
= Indicates league leader

==== Starting pitchers ====
Note: G = Games pitched; IP = Innings pitched; W = Wins; L = Losses; ERA = Earned run average; SO = Strikeouts

Player	G	IP	W	L	ERA	SO
Phil Niekro	44	330.1	16	20	4.03	262
Dick Ruthven	25	151.0	7	13	4.23	84
Andy Messersmith	16	102.1	5	4	4.40	69
Eddie Solomon	18	88.2	6	6	4.57	54
Mickey Mahler	5	23.0	1	2	6.26	14

==== Other pitchers ====
Note: G = Games pitched; IP = Innings pitched; W = Wins; L = Losses; ERA = Earned run average; SO = Strikeouts

Player	G	IP	W	L	ERA	SO
Buzz Capra	45	139.1	6	11	5.36	100
Max León	31	81.2	4	4	3.97	44
Don Collins	40	70.2	3	9	5.09	27
Preston Hanna	17	60.0	2	6	4.95	37
Jamie Easterly	22	58.2	2	4	6.14	37
Frank LaCorte	14	37.0	1	8	11.68	28
Steve Hargan	16	36.2	0	3	6.87	18
Joey McLaughlin	3	6.0	0	0	15.00	0

==== Relief pitchers ====
Note: G = Games pitched; W = Wins; L = Losses; SV = Saves; ERA = Earned run average; SO = Strikeouts

Player	G	W	L	SV	ERA	SO
Dave Campbell	65	0	6	13	3.05	42
Rick Camp	54	6	3	10	4.00	51
Duane Theiss	17	1	1	0	6.53	7
Steve Kline	16	0	0	1	6.64	10
Mike Davey	16	0	0	2	5.06	7
Bob Johnson	15	0	1	0	7.25	16
Mike Marshall	4	1	0	0	9.00	6
Mike Beard	4	0	0	0	9.64	1
Larry Bradford	2	0	0	0	3.38	1

== Farm system ==
Level	Team	League	Manager
AAA	Richmond Braves	International League	Tommie Aaron
AA	Savannah Braves	Southern League	Gene Hassell
A	Greenwood Braves	Western Carolinas League	Bobby Dews
Rookie	Kingsport Braves	Appalachian League	Bob Didier
Rookie	GCL Braves	Gulf Coast League	Pedro González

== Awards and honors ==
=== League leaders ===
- Phil Niekro, National League leader, Losses
