= Billy Hamilton (baseball, born 1990) =

American baseball player (born 1990)

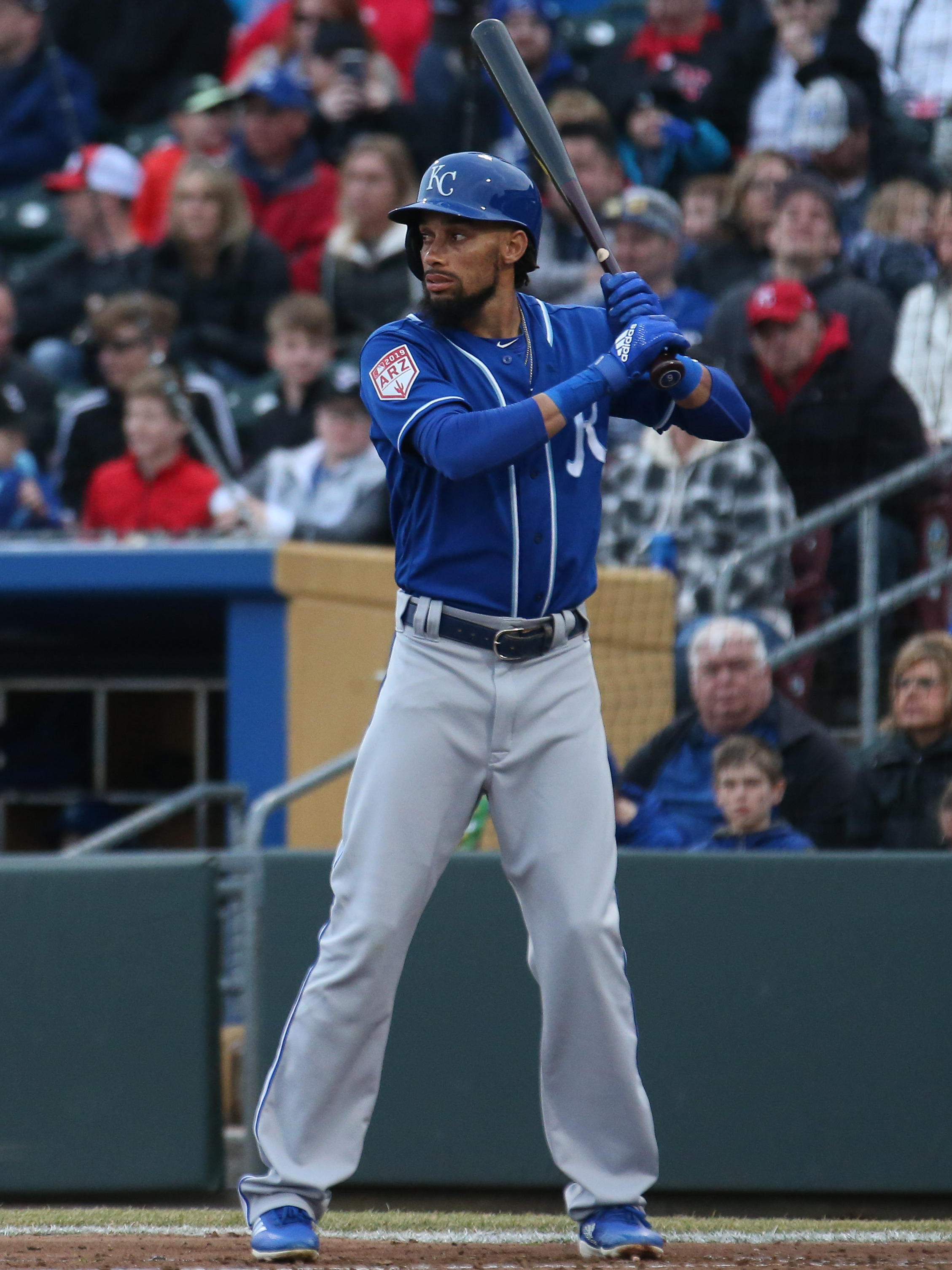
- Hamilton with the Kansas City Royals in 2019

Free agent
- Center fielder
- Born: September 9, 1990 (age 36); Taylorsville, Mississippi, U.S.
- Bats: Right Throws: Right

MLB debut
- September 3, 2013, for the Cincinnati Reds

MLB statistics (through 2023 season)
- Batting average: .239
- Home runs: 24
- Runs batted in: 189
- Stolen bases: 326
- Stats at Baseball Reference

Teams
- Cincinnati Reds (2013–2018); Kansas City Royals (2019); Atlanta Braves (2019); New York Mets (2020); Chicago Cubs (2020); Chicago White Sox (2021); Miami Marlins (2022); Minnesota Twins (2022); Chicago White Sox (2023)

Billy Rayshun Hamilton (born September 9, 1990) is an American professional baseball center fielder who is a free agent. He has previously played in Major League Baseball (MLB) for the Cincinnati Reds, Kansas City Royals, Atlanta Braves, New York Mets, Chicago Cubs, Miami Marlins, Minnesota Twins, and Chicago White Sox. The Reds selected Hamilton in the second round of the 2009 Major League Baseball draft, and he made his MLB debut in 2013. He was originally a switch-hitter until the 2021 season, when he decided to become exclusively a right handed batter after a right oblique strain.

Known for his exceptional speed, Hamilton holds the Minor League Baseball single-season stolen base record with 155 steals—10 higher than the previous Minor League record set by Vince Coleman. He also holds the Cincinnati Reds record for most stolen bases by a rookie in a season, and stole 230 bases from 2014 to 2017, the most of any player in MLB over that time period. He ranked third in steals among all MLB players in the 2010s with 299 steals in the decade.

== Early career ==
=== Amateur career ===
Hamilton attended Taylorsville High School in Taylorsville, Mississippi, where he was all-state in baseball, football and basketball. He was a top football prospect at wide receiver, signing a letter of intent to play college football for the Mississippi State Bulldogs.

== Professional career ==
=== Cincinnati Reds ===
==== Minor leagues ====
The Cincinnati Reds selected Hamilton in the second round of the 2009 Major League Baseball draft.

Prior to the 2011 season, Hamilton was ranked by Baseball America as the 50th-best prospect in baseball. That season, while playing for the Dayton Dragons, Hamilton became the 12th minor league player to have 100 stolen bases in a season, and the first since 2001. He finished the 2011 season with 104 total stolen bases and hit .278/.340/.360. Prior to 2012, Baseball America ranked Hamilton as the 48th-best prospect. MLB rated Hamilton as the 31st-best prospect, fourth-best shortstop, and the second-best prospect in the Reds organization behind catcher Devin Mesoraco.

On August 21, 2012, Hamilton stole a record 146th base in his 120th game of the season for the Pensacola Blue Wahoos. The record was previously held by Vince Coleman for the Class A Macon Redbirds, set in 1983. He finished the 2012 season with 155 stolen bases and hit .311/.410/.420.

After the 2012 season, the Reds announced that Hamilton, who originally played shortstop, would move to center field for 2013. Bill Bavasi, the Reds' vice president of scouting and player development, told MLB.com that the move was made for several reasons, including the fact that two other established shortstops, Zack Cozart and Didi Gregorius, were already on the roster.

Prior to the 2013 season, Hamilton was ranked as the Reds' best prospect by Baseball America. For the season with the Louisville Bats, in 123 games he stole 75 bases and hit .256/.308/.343.

==== Major leagues ====
The Reds promoted Hamilton to the major leagues on September 2, 2013, and made his debut on September 3 against the St. Louis Cardinals as a pinch runner for Ryan Ludwick. He stole second base off Yadier Molina, and came around to score on a Todd Frazier double. Hamilton appeared in four major league games as a pinch runner until September 10 when, in the seventh inning, he replaced Shin-Soo Choo in center field and also made his batting debut, going 0-for-2 in a loss at home to the Chicago Cubs.

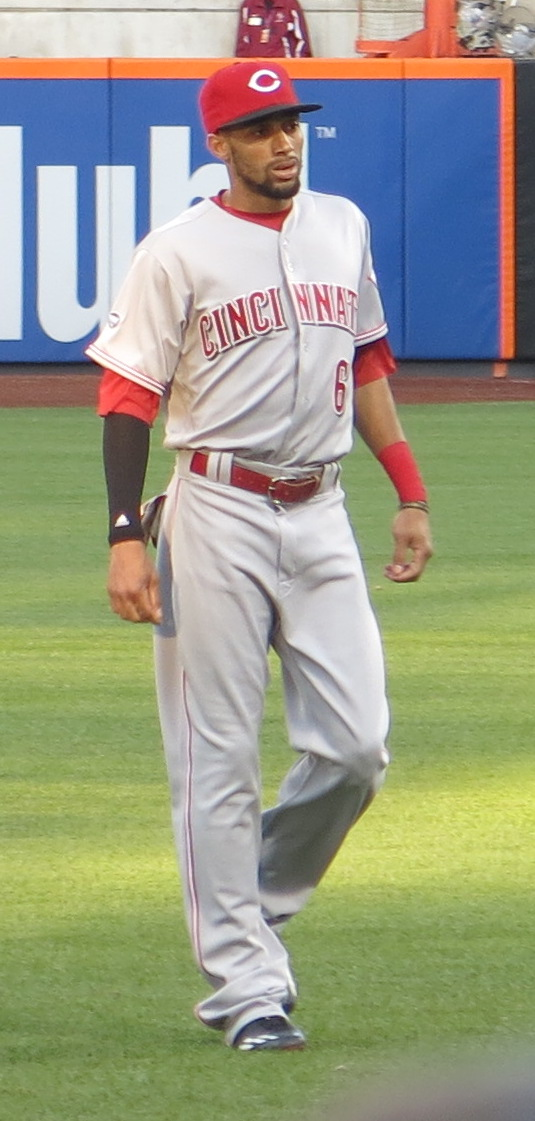
Hamilton with the Reds in 2016

Hamilton made his first start on September 18, 2013, in a Reds road win over the Houston Astros. Playing center field and batting ninth, in his first at-bat of the game he notched his first Major League hit, a second-inning double to left field off Astros' starter Brad Peacock, and later got his first run batted in, driving in Todd Frazier with an infield single. For the game (which went 13 innings), Hamilton reached base five times, going 3-for-4 with two walks, two runs scored, one RBI, and four stolen bases in four attempts off four pitchers. Hamilton became the first major league player since 1920 to steal four bases in his first MLB start. In his first 10 times on base, he stole nine bases and scored six runs. He was successful in his first 13 steal attempts, before being thrown out on his 14th attempt.

Hamilton became a regular with Cincinnati in 2014. He had something of a rough start to the season, hitting just .221 through April 27 and being caught in five of his first 15 attempts at stealing. By around the time of the All-Star break, however, Hamilton's stats had greatly improved and he was attracting positive attention from a number of sources, tipped as a potential Gold Glove candidate for defense and also noted for unexpected power hitting. On September 2, Hamilton, with his 55th stolen base of the season, set a Cincinnati Reds franchise record for most stolen bases in a season by a rookie, edging out the mark of 54 set in 1909 by Bob Bescher. Despite this, Hamilton was second in MLB for stolen bases at the time, with Dee Gordon having recorded 58. For the season, he batted .250/.292/.355 with 56 stolen bases while leading the league in being caught stealing, with 23. On October 23, Hamilton was nominated for the Gold Glove for National League center field, but lost to Juan Lagares of the New York Mets. Hamilton also finished second in NL Rookie of the Year voting, losing to Mets pitcher Jacob DeGrom.

At the opening of the 2015 season, Hamilton joined Vince Coleman (1987) as the only players in MLB history to steal six bases in their team's first three games. In the following game, he stole a seventh base, again matching Coleman for a record by being one of two players to steal seven bases within the first four games of the season. He ended the season hitting .226/.274/.289 with 8 doubles and 3 triples (all career lows) and 57 stolen bases in 454 plate appearances. Balls he hit had the fourth lowest average exit velocity of any major leaguer (83.7 miles per hour), and he had the eighth-fastest sprint speed among major leaguers (29.7 feet per second).

In 2016, Hamilton hit a career-best .260 with a career-low three home runs and 17 RBIs in 119 games, going 58/66 in stolen bases. Balls he hit had the second-lowest average exit velocity of any major leaguer (83.4 miles per hour), and he had the sixth-fastest sprint speed among major leaguers (30.2 feet per second).

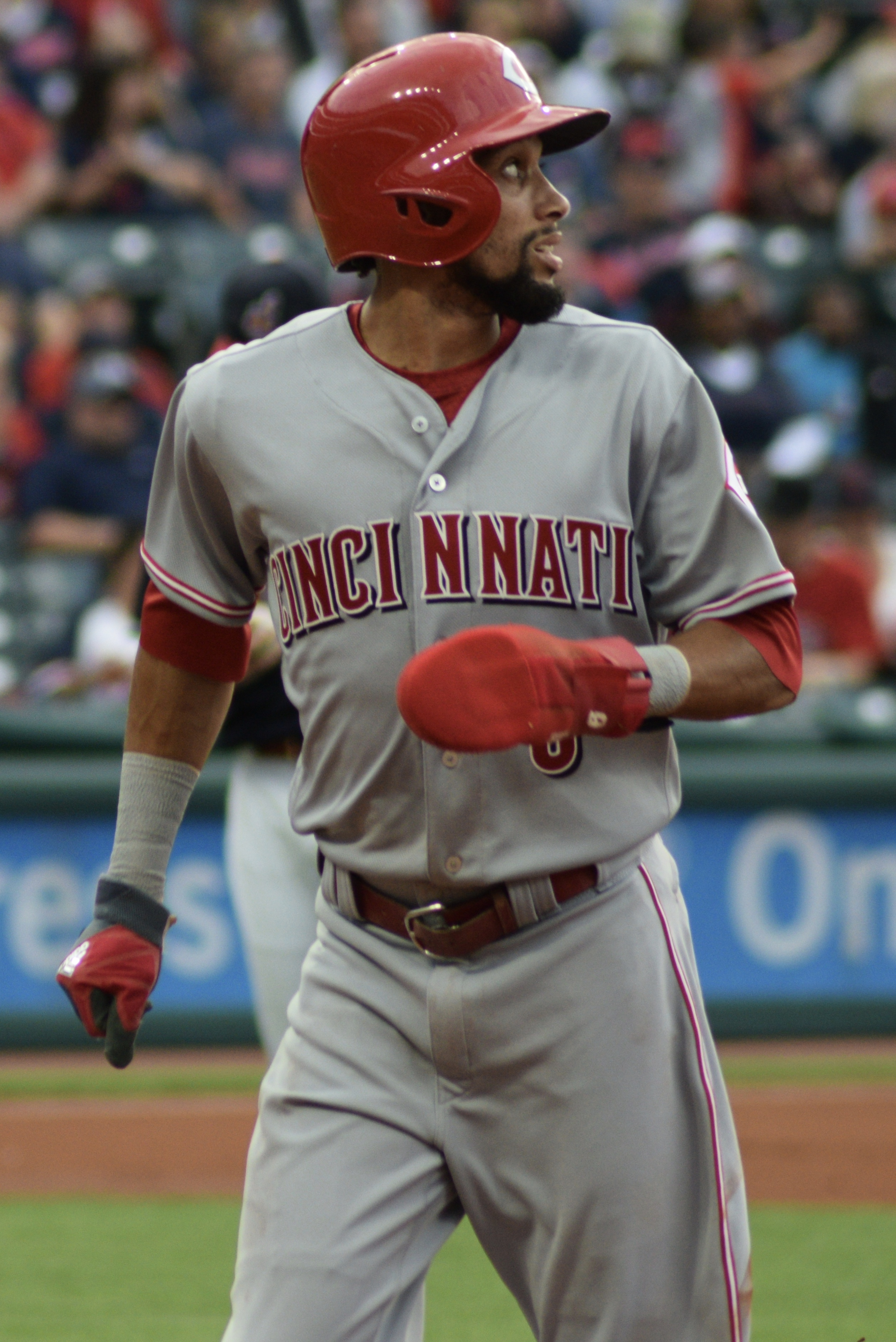
Hamilton with the Cincinnati Reds in 2017

On May 4, 2017, Hamilton stole his 200th career base. He ended the season batting .247/.299/.335 while establishing career bests in at-bats (582), runs (85), hits (144), triples (11), and a career high in strikeouts (133). He also went 59/72 in stolen base attempts. Balls he hit had the second-lowest average exit velocity of any major leaguer (80.5 miles per hour), and he had the sixth-fastest sprint speed among major leaguers (30.1 feet per second).

In 2018, Hamilton led all NL outfielders with 12 assists, but struggled offensively all season, hitting just .236/.299/.327 with 132 strikeouts while going 34-for-44 in stolen base attempts. Balls he hit had the lowest average exit velocity of any major leaguer (80.5 miles per hour), and he had the fifth-fastest sprint speed among major leaguers (30.1 feet per second). He earned $4.6 million. Reds general manager Nick Krall said he tried to trade Hamilton, but there was no interest on the part of other teams. After the 2018 season, the Reds non-tendered Hamilton, making him a free agent.

=== Kansas City Royals ===
On December 11, 2018, Hamilton signed a one-year, $5.25 million contract that included up to $1 million in incentives with a mutual option for the 2020 season, with the Kansas City Royals. On August 16, 2019, Hamilton was designated for assignment.

=== Atlanta Braves ===
On August 19, 2019, Hamilton was claimed off waivers by the Atlanta Braves.

In 2019, between the two teams he batted .218/.289/.275 in 316 at-bats, with 22 stolen bases in 28 attempts. Balls he hit again had the lowest average exit velocity of any major leaguer (78.3 miles per hour), and he had the lowest percentage of hard hit balls of any major leaguer (7.3%).

=== San Francisco Giants ===
On February 7, 2020, Hamilton signed a minor league deal with the San Francisco Giants. He never appeared in a game at the major league level for the Giants.

=== New York Mets ===
On August 2, 2020, the Giants traded Hamilton to the New York Mets in exchange for Jordan Humphreys. On August 4, Hamilton was selected to the active roster. On September 3 during a Subway Series with the New York Yankees leading the Mets 7–6, Hamilton replaced Jeff McNeil as a pinch runner at the bottom the ninth inning. He forced Aroldis Chapman to balk and advanced to 2nd base, however was caught stealing 3rd base (with no outs). On September 4, Hamilton was designated for assignment.

=== Chicago Cubs ===
On September 7, 2020, the Chicago Cubs claimed Hamilton off waivers.

In 2020, between the two teams Hamilton batted .125/.171/.219 with one home run and two RBIs in 32 at-bats, and stole six bases in eight attempts.

=== Cleveland Indians ===
On February 15, 2021, Hamilton signed a minor league contract with the Cleveland Indians. The deal includes an invitation to the Indians' 2021 major league spring training camp. On March 13, Hamilton was released by the Indians after being informed he would not make the Opening Day roster.

=== Chicago White Sox ===
On March 16, 2021, Hamilton signed a minor league contract with the Chicago White Sox. On April 1, Hamilton was selected to the 40-man roster. On May 29, Hamilton hit his first White Sox home run off Baltimore Orioles pitcher John Means. The following day, he homered again off Orioles pitcher Keegan Akin. Hamilton elected free agency following the 2021 season. In 2021 for the White Sox he batted .220/.242/.378 in 127 at-bats, with 23 runs, three triples, two home runs, and 11 RBIs, and stole nine bases without being caught.

=== Seattle Mariners ===
On March 21, 2022, Hamilton signed a minor league contract with the Seattle Mariners. He opted out of his contract and became a free agent again on June 1.

=== Miami Marlins ===
On June 21, 2022, Hamilton signed a minor league contract with the Miami Marlins. He was promoted to the team's major league roster on July 1. He was sent outright on August 12 and elected free agency on August 14. He was 1-for-13 for the Marlins, with one walk and seven steals without being caught.

=== Minnesota Twins ===
On August 29, 2022, Hamilton signed a minor league deal with the Minnesota Twins. He was promoted to the major league roster on September 1. In 2022, he was 0-for-7 for the Twins, with a walk and three steals in four attempts.

=== Chicago White Sox (second stint) ===
On December 16, 2022, Hamilton signed a minor league deal with the Chicago White Sox organization. He began the 2023 season with the Triple-A Charlotte Knights, playing in 17 games and hitting .188/.328/.271 with no home runs, two RBI, and three stolen bases. On May 2, 2023, Hamilton had his contract selected to the active roster. He appeared in three games for Chicago, going hitless in two at-bats with two RBI. Hamilton was placed on the injured list with a left hamstring strain on May 10 and began a rehab assignment on June 6. On June 14, he was removed from the 40-man roster and sent outright to Triple-A Charlotte. Hamilton was released by the White Sox organization on August 22.

=== Tampa Bay Rays ===
On August 30, 2023, Hamilton signed a minor league deal with the Tampa Bay Rays organization. In eight games for the Triple-A Durham Bulls, he went 6-for-20 (.300) with no home runs, no RBI, and five stolen bases. Hamilton elected free agency following the season on November 6.

=== Olmecas de Tabasco ===
On February 22, 2024, Hamilton signed with the Olmecas de Tabasco of the Mexican League. In 11 games for Tabasco, he went 5–for–39 (.128) with three RBI and two stolen bases. Hamilton was released by the Olmecas on April 26.

=== Charros de Jalisco ===
On May 11, 2024, Hamilton signed with the Charros de Jalisco of the Mexican League. In 52 games for the Charros, he batted .283/.335/.367 with 13 home runs and 35 RBI. He led the league in stolen bases, with an overall total of 37.

=== Chicago Cubs (second stint) ===
On August 31, 2025, Hamilton signed a minor league contract with the Chicago Cubs organization. He made six appearances for the Triple-A Iowa Cubs, recording three stolen bases and receiving no at-bats. Hamilton elected free agency following the season on November 6.

=== Charros de Jalisco (second stint) ===
On April 14, 2026, Hamilton signed with the Charros de Jalisco of the Mexican League. In 26 appearances for the Charros, he batted .170/.187/.193 with six RBI and four stolen bases. On July 7, Hamilton was released by Jalisco.
