= Greenwood Braves =

- 1968–1979; Greenwood, South Carolina

Minor league affiliations
- Class: Class A (1968-1979)
- League: Western Carolinas League (1968-1979)

Major league affiliations
- Team: Atlanta Braves (1968-1979)

Minor league titles
- League titles (3): 1968; 1971; 1978
- Division titles (1): 1981

Team data
- Name: Greenwood Braves (1968-1979)
- Ballpark: Legion Park (1968-1979)

The Greenwood Braves were a single-A minor league baseball team located in Greenwood, South Carolina that existed from 1968 to 1979.

== History ==
Affiliated with the Atlanta Braves, the Braves were members of the Western Carolinas League. The Braves captured League Championships in 1968, 1971 and 1978. Baseball Hall of Fame Inductee Hoyt Wilhelm managed the Braves in 1973. After the 1979 season, the team moved to Anderson, South Carolina and became the Anderson Braves. Greenwood regained a minor league team in 1981 when the Greenwood Pirates, also playing at Legion Park, entered the South Atlantic League.

== The ballpark ==
They Braves played home games at Legion Park. Still in use today, the park is located at US 221 at Ginn Street in Greenwood. Legion Park used to be the home stadium of the local Division II Lander Bearcats before they moved to their new home in Dolny Stadium in 2012. Today the stadium is still used by the Lander University Club Baseball team for their home games.

== Notable alumni ==
- Hoyt Wilhelm (1973, MGR) Inducted Baseball Hall of Fame, 1985
- Jose Alvarez
- Scott Bailes (1982)
- Dusty Baker (1968) 2 x MLB All-Star; 3x MLB Manager of the Year
- Steve Bedrosian (1978) MLB All-Star; 1987 NL Cy Young Award
- Bruce Benedict (1976) 2x MLB All-Star
- Mike Bielecki (1981)
- Barry Bonnell (1975)
- Brett Butler (1979) MLB All-Star
- Albert Hall
- Glenn Hubbard (1976-1977) MLB All-Star
- Terry Leach (1977)
- Grady Little (1969)
- Larry McWilliams (1974)
- Rick Mahler (1976)
- Dale Murphy (1975) 7x MLB All-Star; 2x NL Most Valuable Player (1982-1983)
- Rowland Office (1971)
- Joe Orsulak (1981)
- Gerald Perry
- Rafael Ramirez (1978) MLB All-Star
- Rick Renteria (181)
- Bip Roberts (1982-1983) MLB All-Star
- Brian Snitker (1978)
- Milt Thompson (1979)
- Earl Williams (1968) 1971 NL rookie of the Year
