= Mike Beard =

Mike or Michael Beard may refer to:

- Mike Beard (baseball) (1950–2022), American baseball player
- Mike Beard (politician) (born 1953), American politician
