= Macon Pirates =

Minor league baseball team (1984–1987)

- 1984–1987; Macon, Georgia

Minor league affiliations
- Class: Class A (1984–1987)
- League: South Atlantic League (1984–1987)

Major league affiliations
- Team: Pittsburgh Pirates (1984–1987)

Team data
- Ballpark: Luther Williams Field (1984–1987)

The Macon Pirates were a Minor League Baseball team based in Macon, Georgia, that served as the Class A farm team of the Pittsburgh Pirates from 1984 to 1987. The team played their home games at Luther Williams Field in Macon.

The team began play in 1984 when the Greenwood Pirates relocated from Greenwood, South Carolina. After the 1987 season, the team moved to Augusta, Georgia, where they became known as the Augusta Pirates.

== History ==
After the 1983 season, the Savannah Braves left Savannah, Georgia, for Greenville, South Carolina, and became the Greenville Braves. This set off a shuffle in the South Atlantic League, where the Macon Redbirds moved to Savannah to become the Savannah Cardinals, followed by the Greenwood Pirates taking their spot in Macon and becoming the Macon Pirates. Greenwood's attendance had been the lowest among all full season minor league teams, drawing just 8,345 fans during the 1983 season.

The Macon Pirates' owners, disappointed with attendance in Macon, moved the team to Augusta, Georgia, after the 1987 season, where they were known as the Augusta Pirates. After the 1993 season, the team rebranded and is now known as the Augusta GreenJackets.

== Season by season results ==
| Year | Aff. | League | Division | W–L | Win% | Place | Manager | Postseason | Attendance | Ref. |
Macon Pirates
| 1984 | PIT | SAL | South | 57–85 | .401 | 5th | Joe Frisina | – | 32,059 | |
| 1985 | PIT | SAL | South | 56–82 | .406 | 5th | Mike Quade | – | 39,679 | |
| 1986 | PIT | SAL | South | 54–84 | .391 | 5th | Mike Quade | – | 37,816 | |
| 1987 | PIT | SAL | South | 73–64 | .533 | 3rd | Dennis Rogers | – | 41,728 | |
| Totals | | | | 240–315 | .432 | | | | 151,282 | |
