= Sheridan High School (Thornville, Ohio) =

School in Ohio, USA

Location
- 8725 Sheridan Road NW; Thornville, Ohio, (Perry County) 43076; United States; 39°49′37″N 82°22′48″W

Information
- Type: Public, coeducational high school
- Established: 1960
- School district: Northern Local School District
- Superintendent: Angela Gussler
- Principal: Lisa Householder
- Grades: 9-12
- Campus: Rural
- Colors: Red and grey
- Athletics conference: Muskingum Valley League (MVL)
- Mascot: General
- Team name: Generals
- Newspaper: The General Idea
- Yearbook: The Sentinel
- Website: shs.nlsd.k12.oh.us

Sheridan High School is a public high school in Thornville, Ohio. The school is located in Northern Perry County. Sheridan High School's teams are known as the Generals, and the school colors are red and gray.

Three area schools (Glenford, Somerset, and Thornville) were combined in 1960 to form the Northern Local School District. Sheridan High School became the only high school in the new district. When the high school opened in 1960, there were 378 students enrolled in the school.

== Ohio High School Athletic Association State Championships ==
- Boys Basketball – 1942*
- Boys Basketball - 1941**

* Title won by Somerset High School prior to consolidation into Sheridan.
** Title won by Glenford High School prior to consolidation into Sheridan.

== Notable alumni ==
- Duane Theiss, professional baseball player
