= Vince Coleman (baseball) =

American baseball player (born 1961)

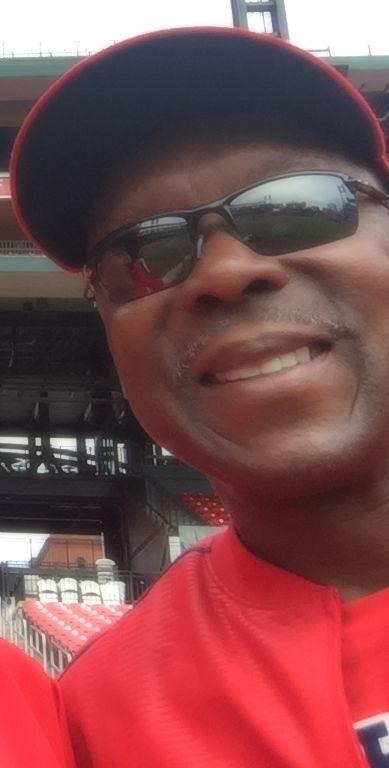
- Coleman in 2016
- Left fielder
- Born: September 22, 1961 (age 65); Jacksonville, Florida, U.S.
- Batted: Switch Threw: Right

MLB debut
- April 18, 1985, for the St. Louis Cardinals

Last MLB appearance
- April 14, 1997, for the Detroit Tigers

MLB statistics
- Batting average: .264
- Home runs: 28
- Runs batted in: 346
- Stolen bases: 752
- Stats at Baseball Reference

Teams
- St. Louis Cardinals (1985–1990); New York Mets (1991–1993); Kansas City Royals (1994–1995); Seattle Mariners (1995); Cincinnati Reds (1996); Detroit Tigers (1997)

Career highlights and awards
- 2× All-Star (1988, 1989); NL Rookie of the Year (1985); 6× NL stolen base leader (1985–1990); St. Louis Cardinals Hall of Fame

Vincent Maurice Coleman (born September 22, 1961) is an American former professional baseball left fielder. He played 13 seasons in Major League Baseball (MLB) for the St. Louis Cardinals, New York Mets, Kansas City Royals, Seattle Mariners, Cincinnati Reds, and Detroit Tigers. A two-time MLB All-Star, Coleman set a number of stolen base records.

== Early life and amateur career ==
Coleman graduated from William M. Raines High School in Jacksonville, Florida, then attended Florida A&M University in Tallahassee. In 1981, he set the all-time single-season stolen base record at Florida A&M, with seven steals in a single game and 65 steals in a season. He led NCAA Division I that year in both total steals and stolen base percentage.

While at Florida A&M, Coleman was also a kicker and punter on the Florida A&M Rattlers football team, where he followed in the footsteps of his cousin, Greg Coleman, who was also a punter at Florida A&M in the 1970s and went on to a 12-year career in the National Football League. Vince Coleman was a member of the Rattlers team that won the 1978 NCAA Division I-AA Football Championship Game. He was named to the all-conference team in both 1980 and 1981 and kicked a game-winning 34-yard field goal in an unlikely 16–13 Rattlers win over the Division I-A Miami Hurricanes in 1979.

Coleman signed as a free agent with the Washington Redskins in 1982, but quit after a week of training camp because the team wanted to convert him into a wide receiver.

== Professional playing career ==
=== St. Louis Cardinals ===
Coleman was drafted in the 10th round of the 1982 Major League Baseball draft by the St. Louis Cardinals. He stole 145 bases in 1983 with the Macon Redbirds of the South Atlantic League, doing so despite missing a month of the season with a broken hand. He further demonstrated his speed and base-stealing ability with 101 steals for the Louisville Redbirds of the American Association in 1984, before being called up to the majors.

Coleman stole 110 bases in his rookie season, the ninth-highest single season steal total in MLB history. Coleman stole over 100 bases in the following two seasons as well, making him the only player in the 20th century to post three consecutive seasons of 100 or more steals, and the first player in major league history to steal 100 bases in the first three seasons of their career.

By the end of only his second year, his 217 stolen bases were second in Cardinal history behind Lou Brock's 888, just ahead of the 203 by Jack Smith. While with St. Louis, Coleman led the National League (NL) in stolen bases in every season he played (1985–1990), one of just four players ever to lead his league in six consecutive seasons. The other players to accomplish this feat are Rickey Henderson, Luis Aparicio, and Maury Wills. Coleman, Henderson, Wills, and Brock are the only modern-era MLB players to steal 100 bases in a season. Since 1901, only Coleman and Henderson have three different 100-steal seasons to their credit, and only Coleman reached the total in three consecutive years.

As the leadoff hitter for St. Louis, Coleman helped the team reach the 1985 playoffs. However, he suffered an injury prior to the fourth game of the NL Championship Series, when the automatic tarp at Busch Stadium rolled over his leg during routine stretching exercises. The injury sidelined him for the rest of the postseason, and the Cardinals eventually lost a seven-game World Series to Kansas City. Following the season, Coleman became the fourth-ever unanimous selection for the NL Rookie of the Year Award.

Coleman compiled the best season of his major league career in 1987, when he posted a .289 batting average and a .363 on-base percentage while totaling 180 hits, 109 stolen bases, and 121 runs scored. He stole second and third base in the same inning 13 times that year.

Coleman played in the 1987 World Series, the only World Series in which he would appear. He batted .143 while reaching base six times (four hits, two walks) and stole six bases without being caught. In the field, he made two assists, both coming in the crucial game 7, making him the first outfielder to throw two runners out at the plate in one World Series game. The Cardinals would go on to lose the Series in seven games to the Minnesota Twins.

In 1989, Coleman compiled a streak of 50 successful stolen bases without being caught stealing, before it was broken on July 28 when he was thrown out by Montreal Expos catcher Nelson Santovenia in a game at Olympic Stadium.

In June 1990, he recorded his 500th stolen base in just his 804th game, the fewest that any player has needed to reach that milestone. As of the end of the 2025 season, he is the last player to steal 100 bases in one season.

=== New York Mets ===
Coleman left for the Mets after the 1990 season via free agency, signing a four-year, $11.95 million contract. However, his career quickly took a downward turn. He played in 235 games out of a possible 486 games over three seasons due to injuries and suspensions. Coleman was one of three Mets named in a sexual assault complaint filed by a 31-year-old woman in Florida, although prosecutors did not pursue charges in the case. His base-stealing strategy became increasingly suspect; he often ignored or misinterpreted his coaches' signs on the base paths.

Compounding the on-field issues, Coleman got into an argument with coach Mike Cubbage in August 1991. In September 1992, he got into a fight with Harrelson's successor, Jeff Torborg, and was suspended for two games. In April 1993, Coleman injured Dwight Gooden's arm while carelessly swinging a golf club in the Mets clubhouse. Three months later, Coleman was charged with endangerment when he threw a lit firecracker into a crowd of baseball fans waiting for autographs in the Dodger Stadium parking lot. The explosion injured three children, including a two-year-old. Coleman was found guilty and ordered to serve 200 hours of community service for the incident. Concurrent with this punishment, the Mets suspended him with pay. On August 26, the Mets announced that as part of a general house-cleaning of the clubhouse, Coleman would not return the following season. Manager Dallas Green said that while Coleman had played well, he did not think he had the "head, and heart, and belly" that he wanted to see on the team. At the end of the 1993 season, the Mets traded Coleman and cash considerations to the Kansas City Royals for Kevin McReynolds.

=== Kansas City Royals and others ===
In 1994 he recorded 76 steals in 179 games as a Royal, before being traded to the Seattle Mariners in mid-1995. 1996 found Coleman with the Cincinnati Reds, who released him in June. He signed with the California Angels, but never played a game for the team. Coleman's final season in the major leagues came in 1997 with the Detroit Tigers, where he again received limited playing time and had little success.

Coleman attempted a comeback with St. Louis in 1998. He batted .313 in spring training, but did not earn a spot on the opening day roster, instead being assigned to the Triple-A Memphis Redbirds. In Memphis he continued to play well, stealing eight bases and hitting .316 with an on-base percentage of .395 in 20 games. However, after failing to receive a prompt promotion to the major league St. Louis squad, he opted to leave the team in May, 1998.

Through the end of the 2025 MLB season, Coleman ranks sixth in all-time career stolen bases in the major leagues, with 752. He ranks 74th all-time in career stolen base percentage among all players with at least 80 attempts, at 80.9%.

=== Jackie Robinson controversy ===
During the 1985 postseason, shortly after Jackie Robinson's widow, Rachel, threw out the ceremonial first pitch, a reporter asked Coleman about Robinson's legacy. Coleman responded, "I don't know nothin' about him. Why are you asking me about Jackie Robinson?" Robinson's widow, when learning of this response, was quoted as saying "I hope somehow he'll learn and be embarrassed by his own ignorance." That offseason, Coleman was unanimously voted the National League Rookie of the Year. Two years later, in 1987, MLB officially renamed the award the Jackie Robinson Award.

== Coaching career ==
Coleman was a coach for the Single-A Quad Cities River Bandits in 2014. The Chicago White Sox added Coleman to their staff as a base-running instructor for the 2015 season. The San Francisco Giants hired him as a roving minor league baserunning and outfield coach in 2017. He also coached at the HBCU Swingman Classic during the All-Star Game weekend.

== Personal life ==
Coleman is Catholic. His son played college baseball for the Southern Jaguars in 2011 and 2012.

== Accomplishments ==
- Sixth all-time for MLB career stolen bases (752)
- National League (NL) Rookie of the Year (ROTY) in 1985
- Most stolen bases by an MLB rookie, with 110 in 1985
- Holds three of the top six stolen base seasons: #3 (110 in 1985), #4 (109 in 1987) and #6 (107 in 1986.)
- The only MLB player to steal at more than 100 bases in three consecutive seasons: 110 in 1985, 107 in 1986, and 109 in 1987.
- The last MLB player to steal 100 bases in a season in 1987.
- Two-time All-Star (1988–89)
- Led the majors in stolen bases four times (1985–87, 1990)
- Led the NL in stolen bases six consecutive years (1985–90)
- Holds MLB record of 50 consecutive stolen bases without being caught (September 18, 1988 – July 26, 1989)

== See also ==
- List of Major League Baseball stolen base records
- List of Major League Baseball individual streaks
- List of Major League Baseball career stolen bases leaders
- List of Major League Baseball annual stolen base leaders
- Major League Baseball titles leaders
- List of St. Louis Cardinals team records
