= Pepe Frías =

Dominican baseball player (born 1948)

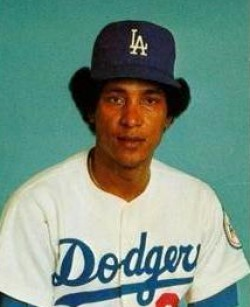
- Shortstop
- Born: July 14, 1948 (age 78); San Pedro de Macorís, Dominican Republic
- Batted: Right Threw: Right

MLB debut
- April 6, 1973, for the Montreal Expos

Last MLB appearance
- August 26, 1981, for the Los Angeles Dodgers

MLB statistics
- Batting average: .240
- Home runs: 1
- Runs batted in: 108
- Stats at Baseball Reference

Teams
- Montreal Expos (1973–1978); Atlanta Braves (1979); Texas Rangers (1980); Los Angeles Dodgers (1980–1981)

Jesús María "Pepe" Frías Andújar (born July 14, 1948) is a Dominican former professional baseball shortstop. He played in Major League Baseball (MLB) for the Montreal Expos, Atlanta Braves, Texas Rangers and Los Angeles Dodgers between 1973 and 1981, appearing in 724 games over nine MLB seasons. Born in San Pedro de Macorís, he threw and batted right-handed and was listed as 5 feet 10 inches (1.78 m) tall and 159 pounds (72 kg).

== Minor leagues ==
Frías signed originally with the San Francisco Giants in 1967, but an anemic bat hampered his progress in professional baseball. After he hit only .173 in 19 games in the lower minors, the Giants released him July 1; signed by the Dodgers that off-season, he was released again just before the 1968 campaign, and he spent that year out of pro ball until the Giants re-signed him in October. But in 1969 Frías continued to struggle at the plate, hitting only .188 in 44 games in the Midwest League, and he drew yet another unconditional release.

Finally, the first-year Expos, building out their farm system, signed Frías for their Double-A Jacksonville affiliate, and in 1970 he batted an acceptable .254 with 125 hits in 136 games and was able to move up in the Montreal organization until he made the 1973 Expos' early-season roster.

== Major leagues ==
Frías spent six full seasons in Montreal as a backup infielder, peaking at 100 games played during his rookie campaign, and hitting .224 in 429 appearances. Finally, on March 1, 1979, the Expos traded him to the Atlanta Braves for pitcher Dave Campbell. It was a break for Frías, now 30 years old: he was able to claim Atlanta's starting shortstop job, starting 136 games, batting .259 with 123 hits, and swatting his only MLB home run, a solo blow off John Candelaria of the Pittsburgh Pirates on May 2 at Three Rivers Stadium.

The 1980 season also saw Frías play regularly, although for the Texas Rangers, to whom he was traded on December 6, 1979. Starting 69 games at shortstop and seven at third base, he batted .242 with 55 hits until he was traded to the Los Angeles Dodgers on September 13 for pitcher Dennis Lewallyn and cash. Reverting to utility infielder status, Frías would appear in 39 total games for the Dodgers before they released him on August 31, 1981.

He then played the 1982–1984 seasons at the Triple-A level before leaving pro baseball after logging 17 seasons.

In the majors, Pepe Frías collected 323 total hits, of which 58 went for extra bases: 49 doubles, eight triples and his 1979 home run. He batted .240 overall with 108 runs batted in.
