= Mike Davey =

American baseball player (born 1952)

- Pitcher
- Born: June 2, 1952 (age 74); Spokane, Washington, U.S.
- Batted: Right Threw: Left

MLB debut
- August 3, 1977, for the Atlanta Braves

Last MLB appearance
- September 29, 1978, for the Atlanta Braves

MLB statistics
- Win–loss record: 0–0
- Earned run average: 4.34
- Strikeouts: 7
- Saves: 2
- Stats at Baseball Reference

Teams
- Atlanta Braves (1977–1978)

Michael Gerard Davey (born June 2, 1952) is an American former professional baseball player, a former middle relief pitcher in Major League Baseball who played from 1977 through 1978 for the Atlanta Braves. Listed at 6 feet 2 inches (1.88 m) and 190 pounds (86 kg), Davey batted right-handed and threw left-handed. A native of Spokane, Washington, he attended Gonzaga University, where he played college baseball for the Bulldogs from 1972 to 1974.

In 19 relief appearances, Davey posted a 4.34 ERA with two saves and did not have a decision, giving up nine runs on 20 hits and 10 walks while striking out seven in 18 2/3 innings of work.

Davey pitched in the Atlanta, Seattle and Pittsburgh minor league systems for the Richmond (1978), Spokane (1979) and Portland teams (1980). In 137 games, he collected an 8–7 record with a 3.83 ERA and 19 saves.

== See also ==
- 1977 Atlanta Braves season
- 1978 Atlanta Braves season
- Atlanta Braves all-time roster
