= Gary Matthews =

American baseball player, outfielder, coach (born 1950)

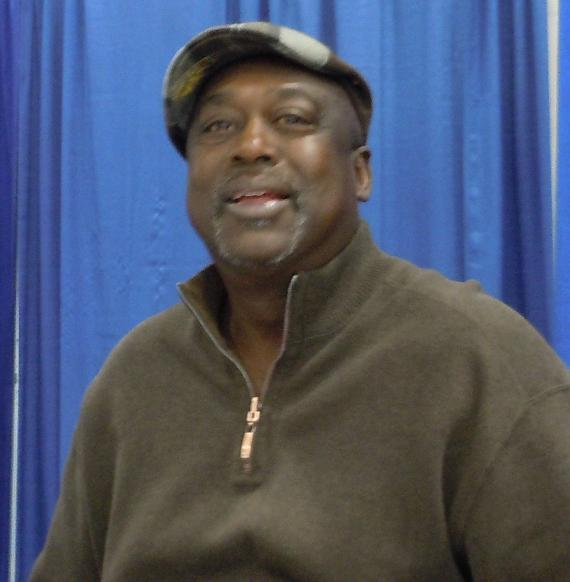
- Left fielder / Right fielder
- Born: July 5, 1950 (age 76); San Fernando, California, U.S.
- Batted: Right Threw: Right

MLB debut
- September 6, 1972, for the San Francisco Giants

Last MLB appearance
- October 2, 1987, for the Seattle Mariners

MLB statistics
- Batting average: .281
- Hits: 2,011
- Home runs: 234
- Runs batted in: 978
- Stats at Baseball Reference

Teams
- As player: San Francisco Giants (1972–1976); Atlanta Braves (1977–1980); Philadelphia Phillies (1981–1983); Chicago Cubs (1984–1987); Seattle Mariners (1987); As coach: Toronto Blue Jays (1998–1999); Milwaukee Brewers (2002); Chicago Cubs (2003–2006)

Career highlights and awards
- All-Star (1979); NL Rookie of the Year (1973); NLCS MVP (1983)

Gary Nathaniel Matthews Sr. (born July 5, 1950), nicknamed "Sarge", is an American former professional baseball left fielder, who played 16 seasons in Major League Baseball (MLB). After his playing days, Matthews was a color commentator for Philadelphia Phillies broadcasts. He is the father of former big league outfielder Gary Matthews Jr. The Matthews are one of seven father/son combinations in Cubs history; another son, Delvon, was a member of Milwaukee's Minor League Baseball (MiLB) system in 2000–2001.

== Playing career ==
Matthews was selected in the first round of the June 1968 draft by the San Francisco Giants. He began his professional career in 1969 playing for the Giants' Decatur Commodores (A) affiliate in Decatur, Illinois. In 1973, his first complete season, he won the National League Rookie of the Year award.

Matthews batted .281 during his 16-season major league career with the San Francisco Giants (1972–76), the Atlanta Braves (1977–80), the Philadelphia Phillies (1981–83), the Chicago Cubs (1984–87) and the Seattle Mariners (1987). He appeared in 2,033 games and recorded 2,011 hits, 234 homers and 978 RBI while scoring 1,083 runs. Matthews was the National League Rookie of the Year in 1973 after batting .300 with 12 homers and 58 RBI for the Giants.

During the advent of MLB free agency, Matthews signed a five‐year, $1,875,000 contract with the Braves on November 17, 1976. The terms included an annual $100,000 salary, a $125,000 bonus, a $250,000 investment account, an offseason job with Braves owner Ted Turner worth $50,000, $200,000 in commissions for his agent and $450,000 in deferred payments that brought an additional $300,000 in interest. Turner's violation of free-agent rules in his pursuit of Matthews earned him a one-year suspension and the Braves were stripped of its first-round selection in the 1977 MLB draft. The denial of the draft pick was voided but Turner's suspension was upheld in Atlanta National League Baseball Club, Inc. v. Kuhn which was adjudicated on May 19, 1977. Matthews had his best overall season with the Braves in 1979, going to the All-Star Game during a season in which he batted .304 with 27 homers and 90 RBI.

Eligible to become a free agent again after the upcoming season, Matthews was acquired by the Phillies from the Braves for Bob Walk on March 25, 1981. He signed a five-year contract extension upon his arrival in Philadelphia. He saw postseason action with the Phillies in 1981 and 1983. He homered 7 times in 19 playoff games and was voted the MVP of the 1983 NLCS after leading the Phillies past Los Angeles into the World Series. In the 5-game series, he went 6-for-14 with three homers and eight RBIs.

Matthews was traded along with Bob Dernier and Porfi Altamirano from the Phillies to the Cubs for Bill Campbell and Mike Diaz on March 27, 1984. He was a key contributor to the Cubs' NL Eastern Division title in 1984, batting .291 with 101 runs scored. In the first game of the 1984 NL Championship Series against San Diego, he homered twice. He spent three seasons as a starter in left field for the Cubs. Matthews was limited by injuries in 1987 before being traded in mid-season to Seattle for minor league pitcher Dave Hartnett.

In his 16-season career, Matthews batted .281 with 234 home runs and 978 RBIs in 2033 games. He finished with 183 career stolen bases, 1083 runs scored and 319 doubles. He had 2011 hits in 7147 at bats. He also exhibited plate discipline, with a lifetime .364 OBP, and a career high of .410. In 19 postseason games, he batted .323 with 7 home runs and 15 RBI. He posted a .968 fielding percentage as an outfielder.

== Coaching career ==
After retiring as a player following the 1987 season, Matthews worked in private industry and broadcasting before joining the Cubs' organization in 1995 as minor league hitting coordinator, a position he held for three years. He left the Cubs in 1998 to become Toronto's hitting coach; he was a member of the Blue Jays' coaching staff for two years, then joined their broadcast team for two seasons. Matthews returned to the field in 2002 as Milwaukee's hitting coach and served as a coach for the Cubs in 2003–06.

== Broadcast career ==
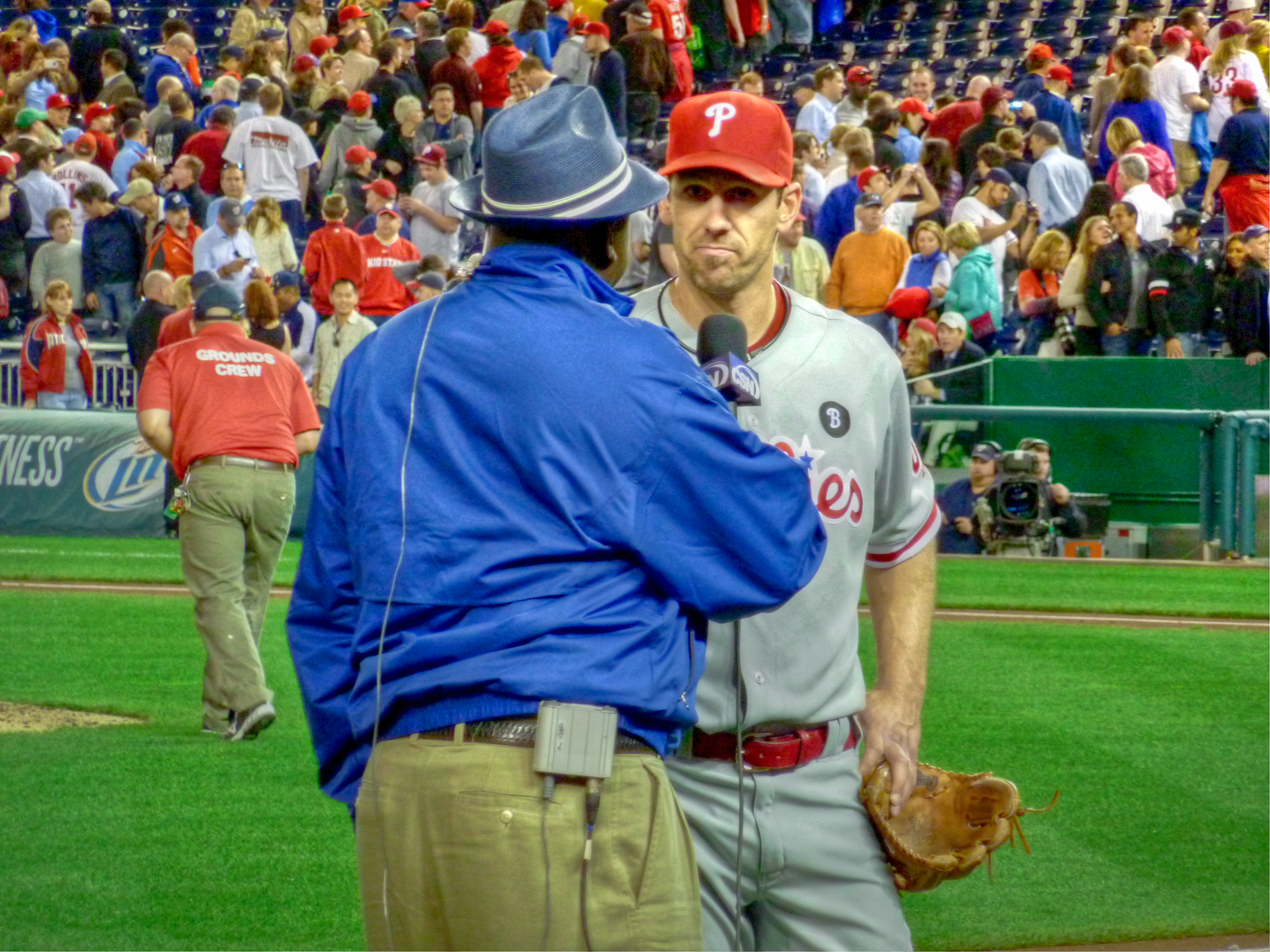
Matthews interviewing Cliff Lee in 2011.

Matthews began his broadcast career as a radio commentator for the Toronto Blue Jays (2000–01) and as a studio analyst on Headline Sports Television, a Canadian cable network based in Toronto. After concluding his coaching career following the 2006 season, Matthews served as a color analyst for the Philadelphia Phillies from 2007 to 2013. During his first year in Philadelphia's booth, Matthews provided analysis for the entire game alongside Harry Kalas and Chris Wheeler (Kalas provided play-by-play for innings 1-3 and 7-9 while doing the 4th on radio and taking the 5th and 6th off. Wheeler relieved Kalas during the middle three innings while doing color analysis with Matthews the rest of the game). For the remainder of his Phillies broadcast tenure, Matthews provided analysis for only the middle three innings. Following Phillies victories from 2008 to 2011, Matthews would also conduct a brief on-field interview with a player who made a key contribution in that day's game.

On January 8, 2014, Matthews and Wheeler were relieved of their commentary duties with the Philadelphia Phillies. Both were assigned other jobs within the organization. Jamie Moyer and Matt Stairs were hired to replace them.

== See also ==
- List of Major League Baseball career hits leaders
- List of Major League Baseball career runs scored leaders
- List of Major League Baseball career stolen bases leaders

Awards and achievements
Preceded by Mike Schmidt	National League Player of the Month; September 1981	Succeeded by Dale Murphy
Sporting positions
Preceded by Gene Tenace	Toronto Blue Jays Hitting Coach; 1998–1999	Succeeded by Cito Gaston
Preceded by Rod Carew	Milwaukee Brewers Hitting Coach; 2002	Succeeded by Butch Wynegar
Preceded by Jeff Pentland	Chicago Cubs Hitting Coach; 2003–2004	Succeeded by Gene Clines
Preceded by Gene Clines	Chicago Cubs First Base Coach; 2005–2006	Succeeded by Matt Sinatro
