= Pat Rockett =

American baseball player (born 1955)

- Shortstop
- Born: January 9, 1955 (age 71); San Antonio, Texas, U.S.
- Batted: Right Threw: Right

MLB debut
- September 17, 1976, for the Atlanta Braves

Last MLB appearance
- July 8, 1978, for the Atlanta Braves

MLB statistics
- Batting average: .214
- Home runs: 1
- Runs batted in: 28
- Stats at Baseball Reference

Teams
- Atlanta Braves (1976–1978)

Patrick Edward Rockett (born January 9, 1955) is an American former baseball shortstop who played for the Atlanta Braves between 1976 and 1978. Rockett was drafted by the Braves as the tenth pick of the 1973 amateur draft. He played his first game with the Braves on September 17, 1976, against the Los Angeles Dodgers; it was one of only four major league games he played in that season.

Rockett played parts of two more seasons with the Braves in 1977 and 1978. He spent the entire 1979 season with the Braves' Triple-A affiliate in Richmond before being traded in the 1979/80 off-season to the Toronto Blue Jays along with Barry Bonnell and Joey McLaughlin for Chris Chambliss and Luis Gómez.

Rockett never played a game with the Blue Jays, spending a year with their Triple-A affiliate in Syracuse before his career came to an end.
