= Macon Redbirds =

- 1980–1983; Macon, Georgia

Minor league affiliations
- Class: Class A (1980–1983)
- League: South Atlantic League (1980–1983)

Major league affiliations
- Team: St. Louis Cardinals (1983); Detroit Tigers (1981–1982); Co-op (1980)

Team data
- Name: Macon Redbirds (1983); Macon Peaches (1980–1982)
- Ballpark: Luther Williams Field (1980–1983)

The Macon Redbirds were a Minor League Baseball team based in Macon, Georgia from 1980 to 1983. They were a member of the Class A South Atlantic League. From 1980 to 1982, they were known as the Macon Peaches. The team played their home games at Luther Williams Field for all four years of their existence.

The team began play in 1980 as a South Atlantic League expansion team. After the 1983 season, they relocated to Savannah, Georgia, where they were known as the Savannah Cardinals.

== History ==
The Western Carolinas League placed expansion teams in Charleston, South Carolina, and Macon, Georgia, after the 1979 season. With the league expanding outside of its geographical moniker, it renamed itself to the South Atlantic League. Macon's team was named the Macon Peaches, in keeping with the Macon Peaches which had played for many years in the old South Atlantic League.

After the 1982 season, the team became affiliated with the St. Louis Cardinals and changed its name to the Macon Redbirds.

The Redbirds moved to Savannah, Georgia after the 1983 season, becoming the Savannah Cardinals. Macon would not go without baseball, however, as the Greenwood Pirates promptly moved in, becoming the Macon Pirates.

== Season by season results ==
Year	Aff.	League	Division	W–L	Win%	Place	Manager	Postseason	Attendance	Ref.
Macon Peaches
1980	–	SAL	South	59–81	.421	4th	Brock Pemberton; Brannon Bonifay; Ted Brazell	–	56,671	
1981	DET	SAL	South	62–79	.440	4th	Tom Kotchman	–	72,557	
1982	DET	SAL	South	66–72	.478	4th	Ted Brazell	–	66,467	
Macon Redbirds
1983	STL	SAL	South	71–73	.493	3rd	Lloyd Merritt	–	37,992	
Totals				258–305	.458				233,687	
