= Chico Ruiz (baseball infielder, born 1951) =

Puerto Rican baseball player

- Infielder
- Born: November 1, 1951 (age 74); Santurce, Puerto Rico
- Batted: Right Threw: Right

MLB debut
- July 29, 1978, for the Atlanta Braves

Last MLB appearance
- September 25, 1980, for the Atlanta Braves

MLB statistics
- Batting average: .292
- Home runs: 0
- Runs batted in: 4
- Stats at Baseball Reference

Teams
- Atlanta Braves (1978, 1980)

Manuel Ruiz Cruz (born November 1, 1951) is a Puerto Rican former professional baseball player. An infielder, he played parts of two seasons in Major League Baseball, 1978 and 1980, for the Atlanta Braves.

== Career ==
Ruiz was signed by the Braves in 1969 at age 17. He began his professional career the following season with the Magic Valley Cowboys, then worked his way up through their farm system, making his major league debut in 1978. In all, he spent his entire fifteen-season playing career in their organization, including all or part of twelve seasons with the Richmond Braves from 1973 to 1984. He retired following the 1984 season.

== See also ==
- List of Major League Baseball players from Puerto Rico

== Sources ==
- Career statistics from Baseball Reference · Baseball Reference (Minors) · Retrosheet · Baseball Almanac
