= Brian Asselstine =

American baseball player (born 1953)

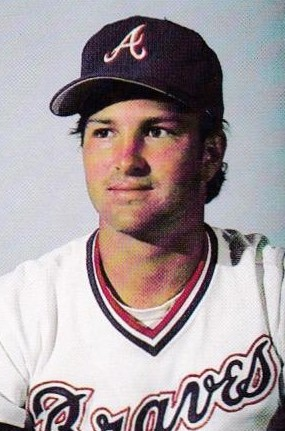
- Outfielder
- Born: September 23, 1953 (age 72); Santa Barbara, California, U.S.
- Batted: Left Threw: Right

MLB debut
- September 14, 1976, for the Atlanta Braves

Last MLB appearance
- October 3, 1981, for the Atlanta Braves

MLB statistics
- Batting average: .254
- Home runs: 12
- Runs batted in: 68
- Stats at Baseball Reference

Teams
- Atlanta Braves (1976–1981)

Brian Hanly Asselstine (born September 23, 1953) is an American former professional baseball player. He played all or part of six seasons in Major League Baseball, from 1976 until 1981, for the Atlanta Braves, primarily as an outfielder. Asselstine was born in Santa Barbara, California and attended Santa Ynez Valley Union High School then Allan Hancock College. He was drafted by the Atlanta Braves in the 1st round (15th pick) of the 1973 Major League Baseball draft

Asselstine won the job as the Braves starting center fielder early in the 1978 season. On May 31, 1978, Asselstine broke the bone just above the ankle in one of his legs as a result of his leaping for a home run hit by Mike Lum. He was out for the rest of the season.
