= Mike Beard (baseball) =

American baseball player (1950-2022)

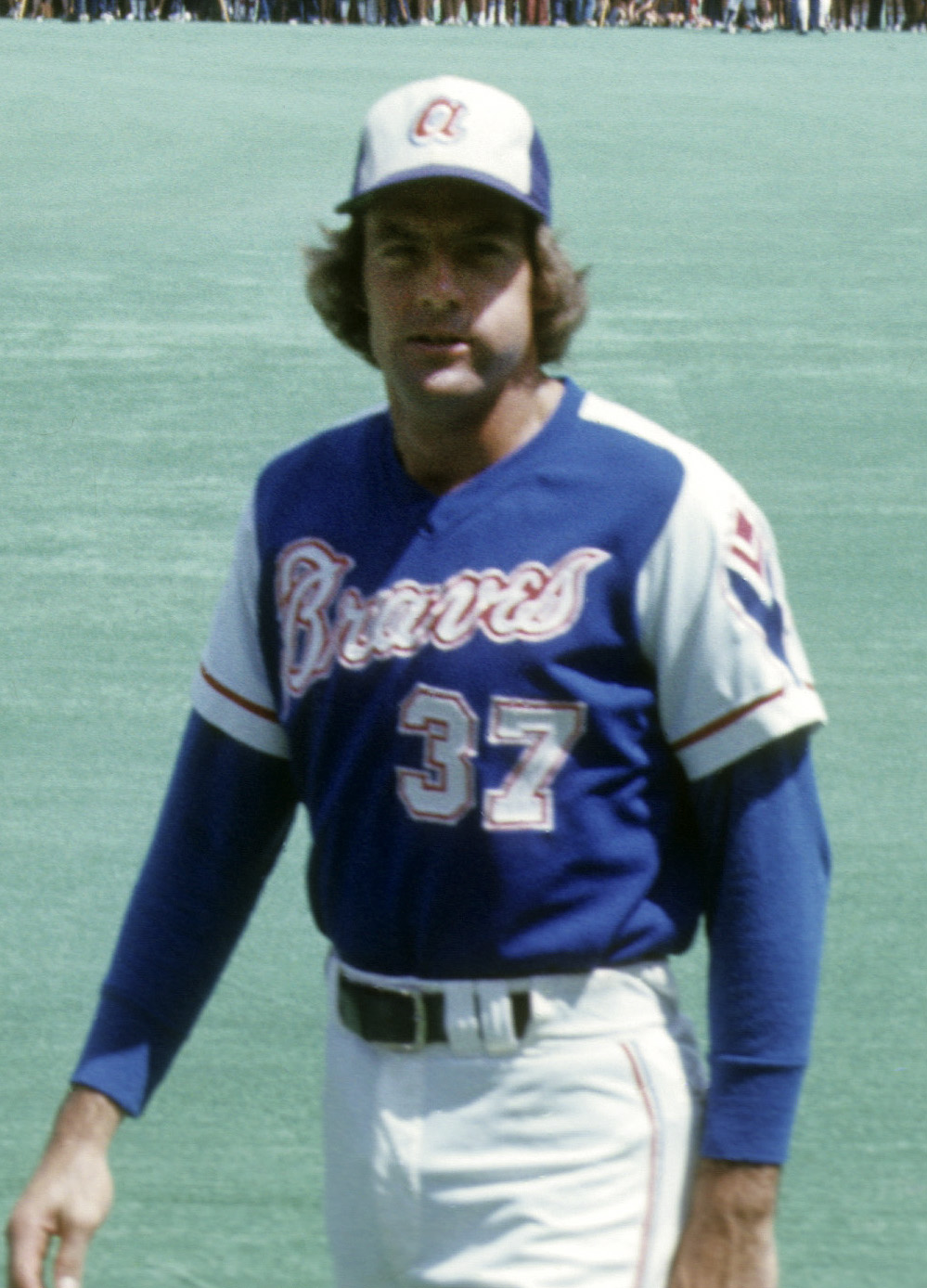
- Pitcher
- Born: June 21, 1950; Little Rock, Arkansas, U.S.
- Died: November 6, 2022 (aged 72); Clarksville, Arkansas, U.S.
- Batted: Left Threw: Left

MLB debut
- September 7, 1974, for the Atlanta Braves

Last MLB appearance
- May 2, 1977, for the Atlanta Braves

MLB statistics
- Win–loss record: 4–2
- Earned run average: 3.74
- Strikeouts: 43
- Stats at Baseball Reference

Teams
- Atlanta Braves (1974–1977)

Michael Richard Beard (June 21, 1950 – November 6, 2022) was an American former professional baseball player, a left-handed pitcher who appeared in 74 games — 72 in relief — in the Major Leagues between 1974 and 1977 for the Atlanta Braves. Beard was drafted by the Braves in the first round (18th overall) of the secondary phase of the 1971 Major League Baseball draft after pitching for the University of Texas at Austin. He stood 6 feet 1 inch (1.85 m) tall and weighed 185 pounds (84 kg).

Beard's finest MLB season came in 1975. Recalled from the Triple-A Richmond Braves in May, Beard appeared in 34 games and compiled a perfect 4–0 win–loss record as a relief pitcher. He also made his only two Major League starts that September against the San Diego Padres and San Francisco Giants. He allowed seven hits and five earned runs in an even nine innings pitched as a starter, but did not earn a decision.

His professional career ended after the 1977 season, his seventh in the game. During his Major League career, he allowed 128 hits and 45 bases on balls, with 43 strikeouts, in 118 innings pitched.
