= Greenwood Pirates =

- 1981–1983; Greenwood, South Carolina

Minor league affiliations
- Class: Class A (1981–1983)
- League: South Atlantic League (1981–1983)

Major league affiliations
- Team: Pittsburgh Pirates (1981–1983)

Team data
- Name: Greenwood Pirates (1981–1983)
- Ballpark: Legion Park (1981–1983)

The Greenwood Pirates were a minor league baseball team in Greenwood, South Carolina, from 1981 to 1983. The team was an affiliate of the Pittsburgh Pirates in the South Atlantic League. The club lasted three seasons before moving to Macon, Georgia, to become the Macon Pirates.

== Season results ==
| Year | Record | Finish | Manager | Playoffs |
|---|---|---|---|---|
| 1981 | 79-65 | 2nd | Joe Frisina | Lost League Finals |
| 1982 | 52-86 | 10th | Joe Frisina | |
| 1983 | 66-78 | 8th | Joe Frisina | |
