= Larry Whisenton =

American baseball player (born 1956)

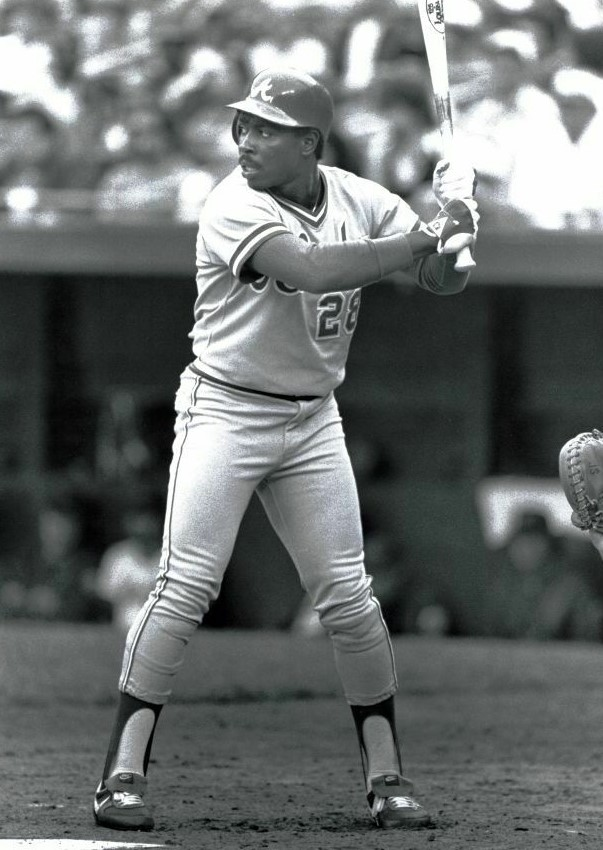
- Outfielder
- Born: July 3, 1956 (age 70); St. Louis, Missouri, U.S.
- Batted: Left Threw: Left

MLB debut
- September 17, 1977, for the Atlanta Braves

Last MLB appearance
- September 30, 1982, for the Atlanta Braves

MLB statistics
- Batting average: .234
- Home runs: 4
- Runs batted in: 21
- Stats at Baseball Reference

Teams
- Atlanta Braves (1977–1979, 1981–1982)

Larry Whisenton (born July 3, 1956) is an American former left-handed Major League Baseball outfielder who played for the Atlanta Braves from 1977 to 1979 and from 1981 to 1982.

Prior to playing professionally, Whisenton attended Central High School in St. Louis. He was drafted in the second round of the 1975 draft by the Braves.

He made his major league debut on September 17, 1977 at the age of 20 against the Los Angeles Dodgers. He was the seventh youngest player in the league that season. He played in four games in 1977, collecting one hit in four at-bats for a .250 batting average. In 1978, Whisenton hit .188 in 16 at-bats, and in 1979 he hit .243 in 37 at-bats. He did not play in the major leagues in 1980. In 1981, Whisenton collected one hit in five at-bats for a .200 batting average. He played his final season in 1982, playing in a career-high 84 games and hitting .238 with four home runs in 143 at-bats. He appeared in his final big league game on September 30, 1982.

Overall, Whisenton hit .234 in 205 career at-bats (116 games) with four home runs, 21 RBI and three stolen bases.

Whisenton also spent 10 seasons in the minor leagues, hitting .272 in 1,175 games. In 3,920 at-bats, he collected 1,068 hits. In 1985 - his final professional season - he hit a career-high .316 while splitting the season between the Greenville Braves and Richmond Braves.
