= Joe Nolan =

American baseball player (born 1951)

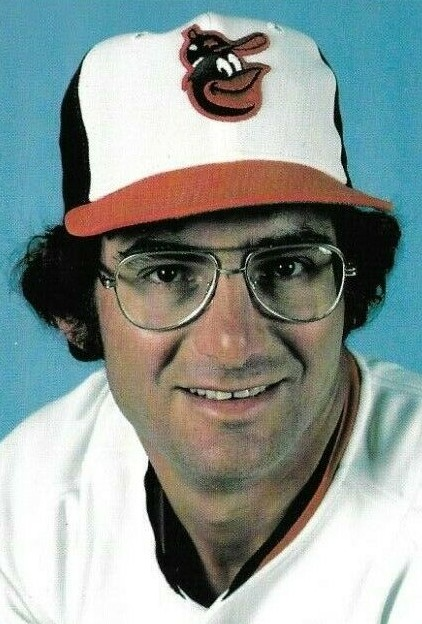
- Catcher
- Born: May 12, 1951 (age 75); St. Louis, Missouri, U.S.
- Batted: Left Threw: Right

MLB debut
- September 21, 1972, for the New York Mets

Last MLB appearance
- June 25, 1985, for the Baltimore Orioles

MLB statistics
- Batting average: .263
- Home runs: 27
- Runs batted in: 178
- Stats at Baseball Reference

Teams
- New York Mets (1972); Atlanta Braves (1975, 1977–1980); Cincinnati Reds (1980–1981); Baltimore Orioles (1982–1985)

Career highlights and awards
- World Series champion (1983)

Joseph William Nolan (born May 12, 1951) is an American former professional baseball catcher, who played for the New York Mets, Atlanta Braves, Cincinnati Reds, and Baltimore Orioles of Major League Baseball (MLB).

== Minor Leagues ==
Selected in the second round of the 1969 Major League Baseball draft by the New York Mets, he turned down a football scholarship at the University of Missouri to sign with the Mets. He is one of only a few Major League catchers to have worn glasses.

== Major League ==
=== New York Mets ===
In 1972, Nolan appeared in 4 games for the New York Mets On April 4, 1975, he was traded by the New York Mets to the Atlanta Braves for infielder Leo Foster.

=== Atlanta Braves ===
In 1975 and 1977-1980, Nolan appeared in 267 games before his June 12, 1980 granting of Free Agency status.

=== Cincinnati Reds ===
On June 13, 1980, he was signed as a Free Agent with the Cincinnati Reds. For the rest of that year and 1981, he appeared in 134 games for the Reds. During the strike-shortened 1981 season, Nolan supplanted Hall of Famer Johnny Bench as the Reds' regular catcher. Bench, then 33, had played 13 consecutive years as Cincinnati's starting backstop, but he shifted to first base in 1981 and only caught in seven games that season. (Bench would catch in only six more games in 1982–1983 as his career wound down.) Nolan started 62 games behind the plate in 1981 (the Reds played in 108 games total), and appeared in 81 games as a receiver. He batted a career-high .309 with 73 hits.

=== Baltimore Orioles ===
On March 26, 1982, he was traded by the Cincinnati Reds to the Baltimore Orioles for minor league player Brooks Carey and Dallas Williams. Nolan said he was disappointed but not surprised by the trade. (The Reds traded 4 of their starters from the 1981 team in addition to Nolan, they traded Ray Knight, George Foster, and Ken Griffey Sr) and He played 3½ seasons and finished his pro career. and was the backup catcher to Rick Dempsey when the Orioles won the 1983 World Series. He appeared in two games against the Philadelphia Phillies and drew a base on balls in three plate appearances.

=== Career ===
Nolan played in 621 Major League games over 11 seasons, finishing with a career batting average of .263 with 27 home runs and 178 RBI.

He was part of the 1983 Baltimore Orioles World Series Championship Team.

== Post career ==
Nolan worked for several years as a manufacturers representative. He had several surgeries, lives with his wife of over 50 years and has three grown daughters. He is an avid outdoorsman.
