= Dave Campbell (pitcher) =

American baseball player (born 1951)

- Pitcher
- Born: September 3, 1951 (age 74); Princeton, Indiana, U.S.
- Batted: Right Threw: Right

MLB debut
- May 6, 1977, for the Atlanta Braves

Last MLB appearance
- October 1, 1978, for the Atlanta Braves

MLB statistics
- Win–loss record: 4–10
- Earned run average: 3.82
- Strikeouts: 87
- Stats at Baseball Reference

Teams
- Atlanta Braves (1977–1978)

David Alan Campbell (born September 3, 1951) is an American former professional baseball pitcher. Campbell pitched two seasons in Major League Baseball for the Atlanta Braves in 1977 and 1978. He appeared in 118 games, all but 14 in relief.

Campbell was signed by the Braves as an amateur free agent in 1974. After two and a half seasons in the minor leagues, Campbell made his major league debut on May 1, 1977, against the Chicago Cubs. He would go on to finish 10th in the National League in saves that year with 13.

In 1978, Campbell finished more games than the previous season, but had just 1 save, and his ERA jumped from 3.05 to 4.80. Also, control proved to be a problem, as he issued 49 walks in 69.1 innings.

The following spring, he was traded to the Montreal Expos for infielder Pepe Frías. He pitched the next three seasons for their top farm club, the Denver Bears, but never returned to the major leagues.
