= Duane Theiss =

American baseball player (born 1953)

- Pitcher
- Born: November 20, 1953 (age 72); Zanesville, Ohio, U.S.
- Batted: Right Threw: Right

MLB debut
- August 5, 1977, for the Atlanta Braves

Last MLB appearance
- October 1, 1978, for the Atlanta Braves

MLB statistics
- Win–loss record: 1–1
- Earned run average: 5.33
- Strikeouts: 10
- Stats at Baseball Reference

Teams
- Atlanta Braves (1977–1978)

Duane Charles Theiss (born November 20, 1953) is an American former Major League Baseball pitcher. He played two seasons with the Atlanta Braves from 1977 to 1978.

Theiss attended Sheridan High School (Thornville, Ohio) then Marietta College, and in 1974 he played collegiate summer baseball with the Wareham Gatemen of the Cape Cod Baseball League. He was drafted in the 12th round of the 1975 MLB draft by the Braves.
