= Rod Gilbreath =

American baseball player (born 1952)

- Second baseman / Third baseman
- Born: September 24, 1952 (age 73); Laurel, Mississippi, U.S.
- Batted: Right Threw: Right

MLB debut
- June 17, 1972, for the Atlanta Braves

Last MLB appearance
- October 1, 1978, for the Atlanta Braves

MLB statistics
- Batting average: .248
- Home runs: 14
- Runs batted in: 125
- Stats at Baseball Reference

Teams
- Atlanta Braves (1972–1978)

Rodney Joe Gilbreath (born September 24, 1952) is an American former Major League Baseball second baseman from 1972 to 1978 for the Atlanta Braves.

== Early life ==
Rod Gilbreath attended Watkins High School in Laurel, Mississippi. After high school he enrolled in Jones County Junior College.

== Professional career ==
Gilbreath was selected by Atlanta in the third round (69th overall) of the 1970 Major League Baseball draft. He progressed through the Braves' farm system and entered the Majors, at age 19, after his promotion from the Double-A Savannah Braves during the midseason of 1972. He divided his next two seasons between Atlanta and the Triple-A Richmond Braves, then played the full seasons of 1975–1978 in Atlanta, exceeding the 100-games played mark during his last three seasons.

In 1976 he led the National League with 20 sacrifice hits.

Gilbreath retired as an active player after the 1980 minor league baseball season. He then rejoined the Braves as a scout, minor league manager, and player development executive. In 2011, he was still a member of the Braves' organization, working as a member of its professional scouting staff.
