= Rowland Office =

American baseball player (born 1952)

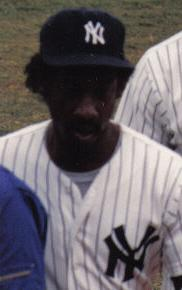
- Office with the New York Yankees
- Center fielder
- Born: October 25, 1952 (age 73); Sacramento, California, U.S.
- Batted: Left Threw: Left

MLB debut
- August 5, 1972, for the Atlanta Braves

Last MLB appearance
- April 20, 1983, for the New York Yankees

MLB statistics
- Batting average: .259
- Home runs: 32
- Runs batted in: 242
- Stats at Baseball Reference

Teams
- Atlanta Braves (1972, 1974–1979); Montreal Expos (1980–1982); New York Yankees (1983)

Rowland Johnie Office (born October 25, 1952) is an American former professional baseball outfielder for the Atlanta Braves, Montreal Expos and New York Yankees of Major League Baseball (MLB) between 1972 and 1983.

== Biography ==
Born in Sacramento, California, Office played baseball there at C. K. McClatchy High School and Sacramento City College. He played against future MLB teammate Jerry Royster in Sacramento's Metro League.

Office debuted with the Atlanta Braves in 1972, making him the youngest MLB player that year. After spending the 1973 season in the minor leagues, he started to become a regular in the Braves lineup in 1974. Office shared left field responsibilities with future Hall of Famer Hank Aaron, who was nearing the end of his career. Biographers Mark L. Stewart and Mike Kennedy described Office as "an impossibly skinny 21-year-old who played his position with tremendous enthusiasm, if not always the highest regard for his body." Office made one of the most well-known defensive plays in the history of Atlanta–Fulton County Stadium in 1975, when he leaped to catch a ball that appeared to be on its way over the outfield wall.

In 1976, with the Braves in the middle of a string of several losing seasons, Office had a 29-game hitting streak. However, he injured his knee in July, which limited his productivity for the rest of the year. Remaining with the Braves through 1979, Office next signed as a free agent with the Expos. The team released him in early 1982, and he joined the minor league system of the Philadelphia Phillies.

Office got an opportunity with the New York Yankees in 1983, but he only appeared in two MLB games that season. Spending most of that year in the minor leagues with the Columbus Clippers, Office had a .297 batting average with eight home runs and 45 runs batted in in 87 games. In 11 seasons, Office played in 899 games and had a .259 batting average.
