= Barry Bonnell =

American baseball player (born 1953)

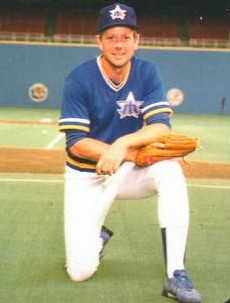
- Outfielder
- Born: October 27, 1953 (age 71); Mariemont, Ohio, U.S.
- Batted: Right Threw: Right

MLB debut
- May 4, 1977, for the Atlanta Braves

Last MLB appearance
- July 12, 1986, for the Seattle Mariners

MLB statistics
- Batting average: .272
- Home runs: 56
- Runs batted in: 355
- Stats at Baseball Reference

Teams
- Atlanta Braves (1977–1979); Toronto Blue Jays (1980–1983); Seattle Mariners (1984–1986)

Robert Barry Bonnell (born October 27, 1953) is an American former professional baseball outfielder. After playing basketball and baseball for the Ohio State University (OSU), he played in Major League Baseball (MLB) for the Atlanta Braves, Toronto Blue Jays and Seattle Mariners between 1977 and 1986.

== Early life ==
Bonnell was a star athlete at Milford High School near Cincinnati, Ohio, where he played both varsity baseball and basketball on championship teams. Following high school graduation in 1971, Bonnell attended OSU on a full athletic scholarship where he played both baseball and basketball. Bonnell left college during his senior year to play MLB. The Philadelphia Phillies made him the first overall pick in the 1975 MLB January Draft – Secondary Phase (for college players who had been previously drafted out of high school).

== MLB career ==
During his 10-year MLB career, Bonnell played for the Atlanta Braves of the National League, and the Toronto Blue Jays and Seattle Mariners of the American League. His major league debut with the Braves was in a game against the Pittsburgh Pirates on May 4, 1977.

His best year was 1983, when he hit .318 (10 HR, 54 RBI and 10 SB) for the Blue Jays. Known by his peers as a "money hitter", Bonnell hit four grand slams during his career and led his teams in game-winning hits nearly every year he played. Bonnell was known for his strong and accurate throwing arm.

Traded to the Seattle Mariners in 1984, he contracted Valley fever during spring training, and developed pneumonia. Bonnell struggled to play with the affliction. It took a year to recover and he served his remaining two years as a bit player.

== Personal life ==
Bonnell married his high school sweetheart, Stefnie Stapp. Bonnell is a devout member of the Church of Jesus Christ of Latter-day Saints, and he introduced Braves teammate, Dale Murphy, to the faith.
