= Houston Astros =

American professional baseball team in Texas

- 2026 Houston Astros season

Logo	Cap insignia
- Established in 1962

Major league affiliations
- American League (2013–present); West Division (2013–present); National League (1962–2012); Central Division (1994–2012); West Division (1969–1993)

Current uniform
- Retired numbers: 5; 7; 13; 24; 25; 32; 33; 34; 40; 49; 42

Colors
- Dark blue, orange, white (Note: The team's official colors are blue and orange, according to the team's mascot (Orbit)'s official website.)

Name
- Houston Astros (1965–present); Houston Colt .45s (1962–1964)

Nicknames
- 'Stros; Crush City (2015); The Stars; The Astronauts

Ballpark
- Daikin Park (2000–present); Astrodome (1965–1999); Colt Stadium (1962–1964)

Major league titles
- World Series titles (2): 2017; 2022
- AL pennants (4): 2017; 2019; 2021; 2022
- NL pennants (1): 2005
- AL West division titles (8): 2017; 2018; 2019; 2021; 2022; 2023; 2024; 2026
- NL Central division titles (4): 1997; 1998; 1999; 2001
- NL West division titles (2): 1980; 1986
- Wild card berths (4): 2004; 2005; 2015; 2020

Front office
- Principal owner: Jim Crane
- General manager: Randy Flores
- Manager: Brad Ausmus
- Website: mlb.com/astros

The Houston Astros are an American professional baseball team based in Houston. The Astros compete in Major League Baseball (MLB) as a member club of the American League (AL) West Division. They are one of two major league clubs based in Texas; the Texas Rangers belong to the same division. They play their home games at Daikin Park.

Established as the Houston Colt .45s, the Astros entered the National League as an expansion team in 1962 along with the New York Mets. The current name, short for the Astronauts, was adopted three years later at the suggestion of astronaut Alan Shepard, when they moved into the Astrodome, the world's first multi-purpose, domed sports stadium. The Astros moved to Enron Field (now Daikin Park) in 2000. The team played in the NL West division from 1969 to 1993, then the NL Central division from 1994 to 2012, before being moved to the AL West as part of an MLB realignment in 2013.

The Astros posted their first winning record in 1972 and made the playoffs for the first time in 1980, before winning a total of three division titles throughout the 1980s. Spearheaded by the Killer B's, a collection of prominent hitters that included the Astros' Hall of Fame members Craig Biggio and Jeff Bagwell, along with closer Billy Wagner, the Astros began reaching major prominence in the late 1990s and early 2000s with four further division titles and two Wild Card appearances, culminating in their first World Series appearance in 2005 where they were swept by the Chicago White Sox.

After a major slump throughout the next decade, the team was purchased by business owner Jim Crane in 2011 for $680 million. Under Crane's ownership and the tenure of former GM Jeff Luhnow, the Astros embraced sabermetrics and pioneered new analytical technologies in their transition to the American League, and by the mid-2010s transformed from a historically middling franchise into one of MLB's most dominant and successful clubs, as headlined by stars such as Jose Altuve. Since then, the Astros have won over 100 games in four seasons, and appeared in a record seven consecutive American League Championship Series between 2017 and 2023, winning the American League pennant four times. During this era, the Astros won the 2017 World Series, their first championship, against the Los Angeles Dodgers; however, this win drew controversy and backlash from fans after the Astros were implicated in a sign stealing scandal.

The Astros made later World Series appearances in 2019 against the Washington Nationals, 2021 against the Atlanta Braves, and 2022 against the Philadelphia Phillies, winning their second title in the latter series. Often cited as one of the best teams in the American League, the team's sustained success since 2015 has led some to declare the Astros a dynasty. They are the only team to win a postseason series in seven straight seasons. Their fifth pennant in 2022 made them the second team created in the expansion era to win five league pennants (after the Mets) and the fifth expansion team to have won two World Series championships. In 2024, the Astros clinched their AL West division title for the seventh time in eight years and became the first team to win the AL West division in four straight years since the 1971–1975 era Oakland Athletics.

While in the National League, the Astros held rivalries with the Braves and the St. Louis Cardinals, but since their transition to the American League, have come to hold divisional rivalries with the Seattle Mariners and Texas Rangers (known as the Lone Star Series), as well as a recurring postseason rivalry with the New York Yankees. From 1962 through the end of the 2026 season, the Astros' all-time record is 5,177–5,121–5 (.503). In addition to having the most postseason appearances by an expansion team, they are the only expansion era team with an all-time winning record. In 2024, the Astros became the second expansion team to reach 5,000 wins.

== History ==
=== Major League Baseball comes to Texas ===
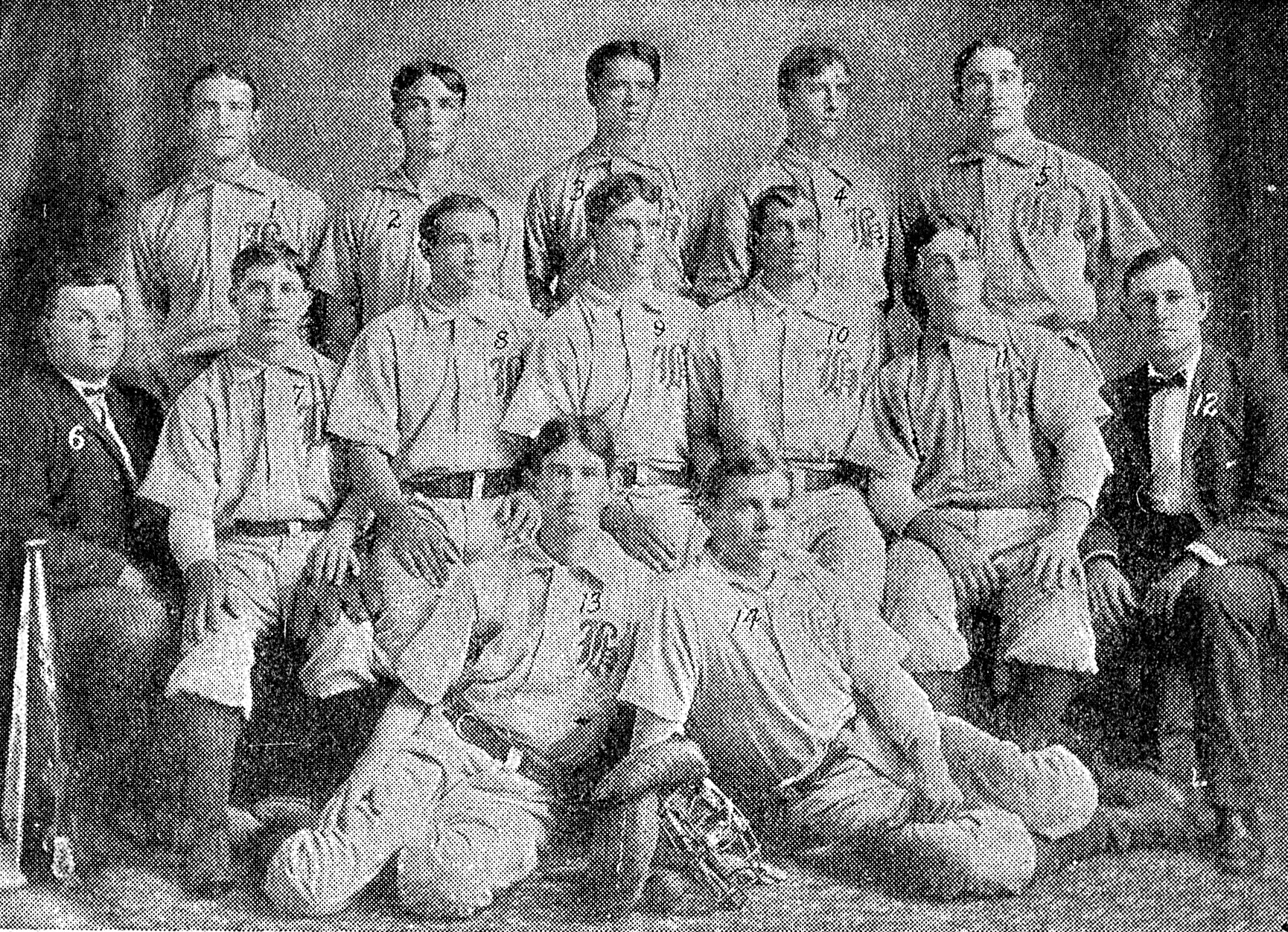
1905 Houston Buffaloes team photo

From 1888 until 1961, Houston's professional baseball club was the minor league Houston Buffaloes. Houston officials tried for years to bring an MLB team to Texas. In 1952, a bid to buy the St. Louis Cardinals for $4.25 million, was rejected for local owners.

National League expansion finally brought an MLB team to Texas in 1962. There were four men chiefly responsible: journalist/promoter George Kirksey; Craig Cullinan Jr.; R.E. "Bob" Smith, a prominent oilman and real estate magnate in Houston who like Cullinan was brought in for his financial resources; and Judge Roy Hofheinz, a former mayor of Houston and Harris County judge who was recruited for his salesmanship and political style. They founded the Houston Sports Association (HSA) as their vehicle.

Given MLB's refusal to consider expansion, Kirksey, Cullinan, Smith, and Hofheinz joined forces with would-be owners from other cities and announced the formation of a new league to compete with the established National and American Leagues. They called the new league the Continental League. Wanting to protect potential new markets, the older leagues chose to expand from eight teams to ten. Plans eventually fell through for the Houston franchise after the Houston Buffaloes owner, Marty Marion, could not come to an agreement with the HSA to sell the team. The Continental League folded in August 1960.

However, on October 17, 1960, the National League granted an expansion franchise to the Houston Sports Association for them to begin play in the 1962 season. According to the Major League Baseball Constitution, the Houston Sports Association was required to obtain territorial rights from the Houston Buffaloes in order to play in the Houston area, resulting in the HSA revisiting negotiations. Eventually, the Houston Sports Association succeeded in purchasing the Houston Buffaloes, which were at this point majority-owned by William Hopkins, on January 17, 1961. The Buffs played one last minor league season as the top farm team of the Chicago Cubs in 1961 before being succeeded by the city's NL club.

The new Houston team was named the Colt .45s after a "Name the Team" contest was won by William Irving Neder. The Colt .45 was well known as "the gun that won the west". The colors selected were navy and orange. The first team was formed mostly through an expansion draft after the 1961 season. The Colt .45s and their expansion cousins, the New York Mets, took turns choosing players left unprotected by the other National League franchises.

Many players and staff associated with the Houston Buffaloes organization continued in the major leagues. Manager Harry Craft, who had joined Houston in 1961, remained in the same position for the team until the end of the 1964 season. General manager Spec Richardson also continued with the organization as business manager but was later promoted back to GM for the Astros from 1967 until 1975. Although most players for the major league franchise were obtained through the 1961 Major League Baseball expansion draft, Buffs players J.C. Hartman, Pidge Browne, Jim Campbell, Ron Davis, Dave Giusti, and Dave Roberts were chosen to continue as major league ball players.

Similarly, the radio broadcasting team remained with the new Houston major league franchise. Loel Passe worked alongside Gene Elston as a color commentator until he retired from broadcasting in 1976. Elston continued with the Astros until 1986.

The Colt .45s began their existence playing at Colt Stadium, a temporary venue built just north of the construction site of their permanent home, a domed stadium. Hofheinz and his partners believed a domed stadium was a must for MLB to be viable in Houston, given the area's oppressive humidity.

=== 1962–1964: The Colt .45s ===
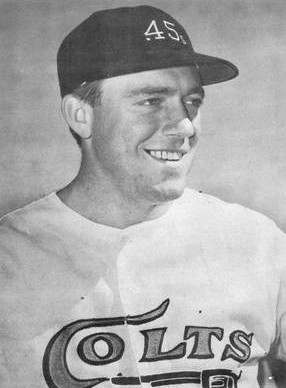
Al Spangler, pictured in the first uniform of the Colt .45s in 1963

The Colt .45s started their inaugural season on April 10, 1962, against the Chicago Cubs with Harry Craft as the Colt .45s' manager. Bob Aspromonte scored the first run for the Colt .45s on an Al Spangler triple in the first inning. They started the season with a three-game sweep of the Cubs but eventually finished eighth among the National League's ten teams. The team's best pitcher, Richard "Turk" Farrell, lost 20 games despite an ERA of 3.02. A starter for the Colt .45s, Farrell was primarily a relief pitcher before playing for Houston. He was selected to both All-Star Games in 1962.

The 1963 season saw more young talent mixed with seasoned veterans, including the major-league debuts of Jimmy Wynn, Rusty Staub, and Joe Morgan. However, Houston's position in the standings did not improve, as the Colt .45s finished in ninth place with a 66–96 record. The 1964 campaign began on a sad note, as relief pitcher Jim Umbricht died of cancer at the age of 33 on April 8, just before Opening Day. Umbricht was the only Colt .45s pitcher to post a winning record in Houston's first two seasons. He was so well liked by players and fans that the team retired his jersey number, 32, in 1965.

The new domed stadium was rising, and it would soon change the way that baseball was watched in Houston and around the league. On December 1, 1964, the team renamed themselves the "Astros", alluding to Houston's role in the American space program.

=== 1965–1970: The Great Indoors ===
With Judge Roy Hofheinz now the sole owner of the franchise, the team moved into the completed Astrodome in 1965. But the "Eighth Wonder of the World" did little to improve the home team's results on the field. Despite several "indoor" firsts for MLB, the team once again finished ninth in the standings. The attendance was high not because of the team's accomplishments, but because people came from miles around to see the Astrodome.

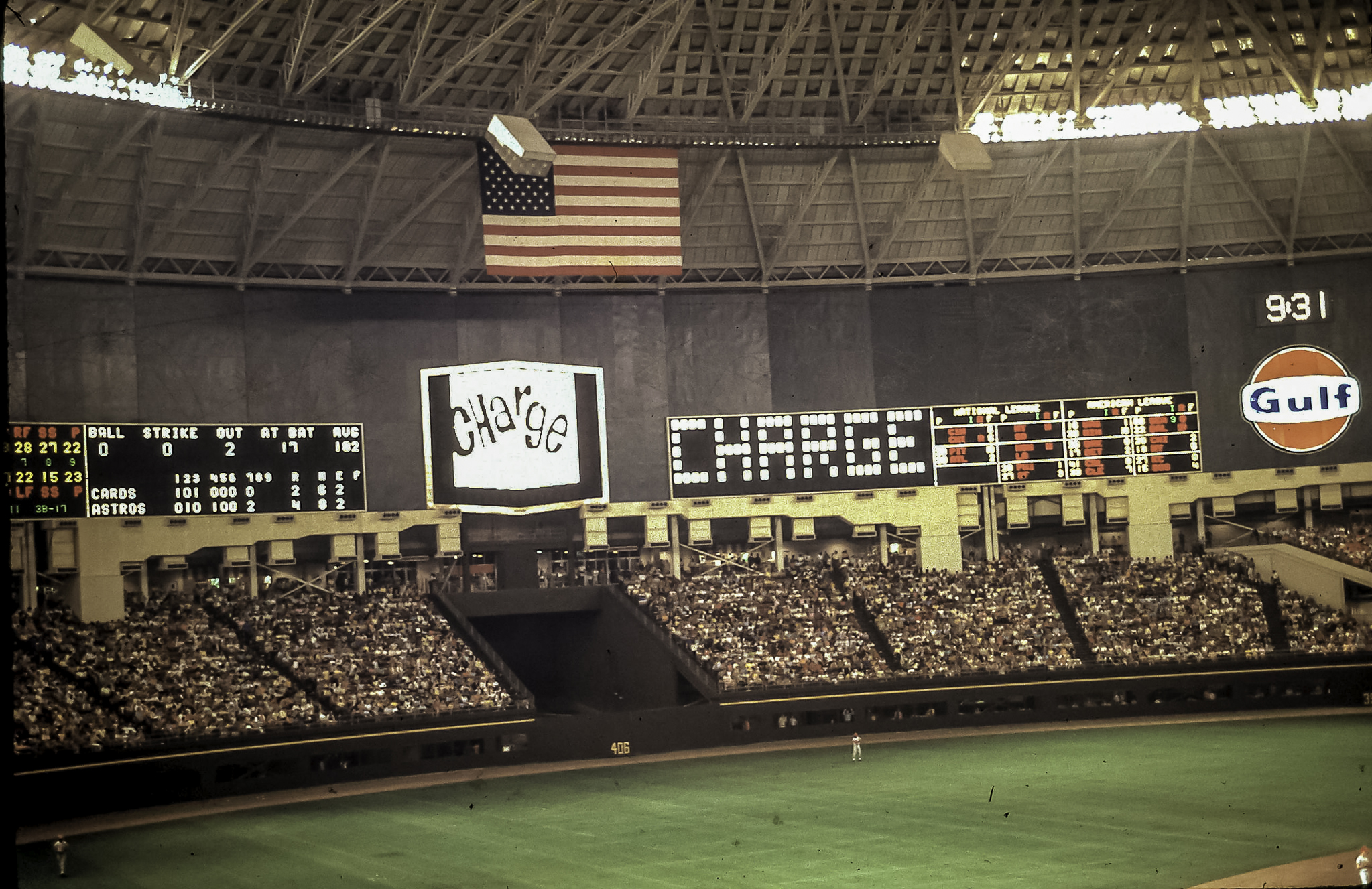
Houston Astrodome Scoreboard pictured during a June 7, 1969, game between the Astros and Cardinals

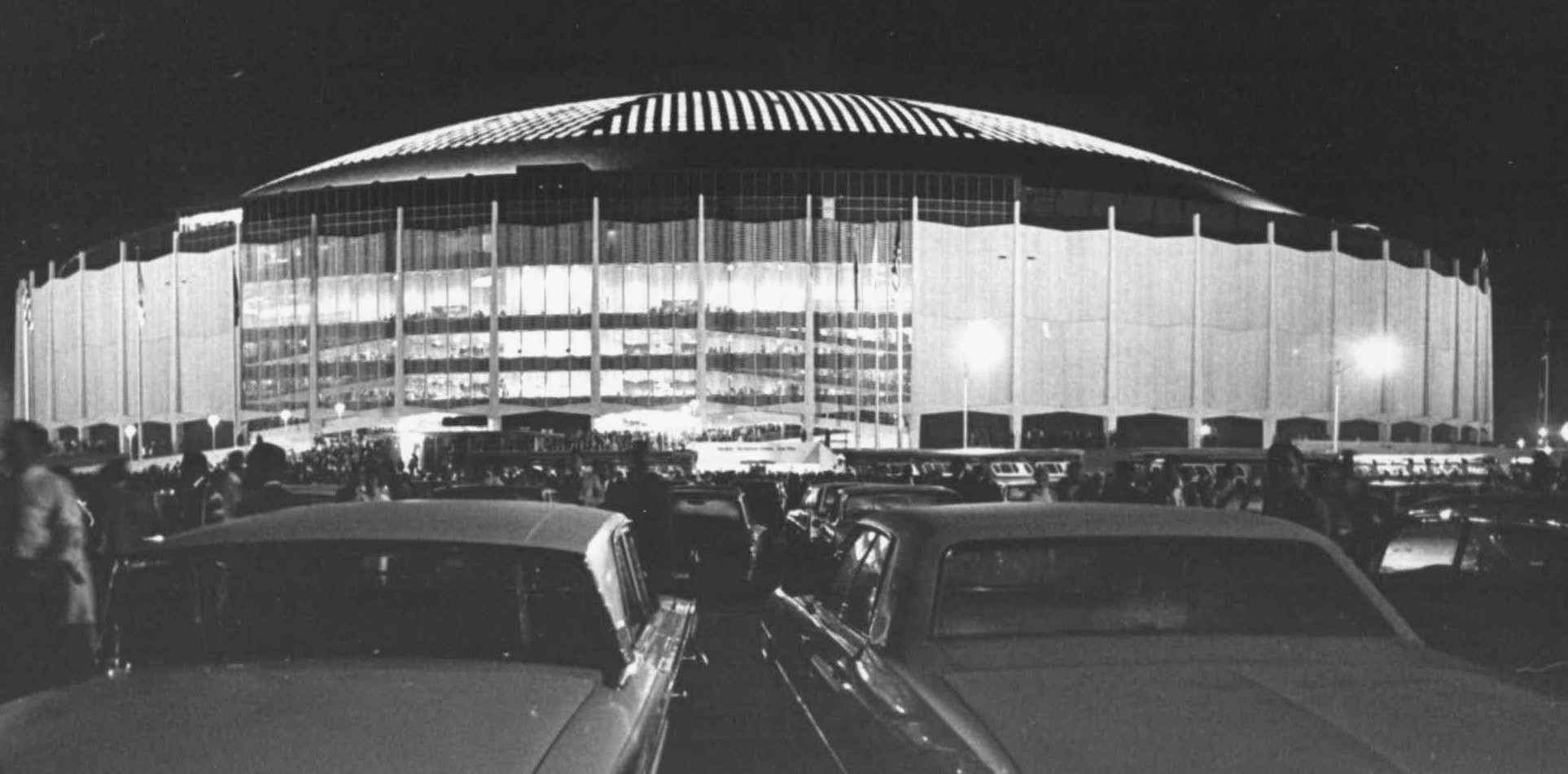
The Astrodome in 1965

Just as the excitement was settling down over the Astrodome, the 1966 season found something new to put the domed stadium in the spotlight once again – the field. Grass would not grow in the new park, since the roof panels had been painted to reduce the glare that was causing players on both the Astros and the visiting teams to miss routine pop flies. A new artificial turf was created called "AstroTurf" and Houston would be involved in yet another change in the way the game was played.

With new manager Grady Hatton, the Astros started the 1966 season strong. By May they were in second place in the National League and looked like a team that could contend. Joe Morgan was named as a starter on the All-Star Team. The success did not last as they lost Jimmy Wynn for the season after he crashed into an outfield fence in Philadelphia and Morgan had broken his knee cap. The 1967 season saw first baseman Eddie Mathews join the Astros. The slugger hit his 500th home run while in Houston. He was traded late in the season and Doug Rader was promoted to the big leagues. Rookie Don Wilson pitched a no-hitter on June 18, the first ever at the Astrodome. Wynn also provided some enthusiasm in 1967. The 5 ft 9 in (1.75 m) Wynn was becoming known not only for how often he hit home runs, but also for how far he hit them. Wynn set club records with 37 home runs, and 107 RBIs. It was also in 1967 that Wynn hit his famous home run onto Interstate 75 in Cincinnati. As the season came to a close, the Astros found themselves again in ninth place and with a winning percentage below .500. The team looked good on paper, but could not make it work on the field.

April 15, 1968, saw a pitching duel for the ages. The Astros' Don Wilson and the Mets' Tom Seaver faced each other in a battle that lasted six hours. Seaver went ten innings, allowing no walks and just two hits. Wilson went nine innings, allowing five hits and three walks. After the starters exited, eleven relievers (seven for the Mets and four for the Astros) tried to end the game. The game finally ended in the 24th inning when Bob Aspromonte hit a shot toward Mets shortstop Al Weis. Weis had been perfect all night at short, but he was not quick enough to make the play. The ball zipped into left field, allowing Norm Miller to score.

With baseball expansion and trades, the Astros had dramatically changed in 1969. Aspromonte was sent to the Braves and Rusty Staub was traded to the expansion Montreal Expos, in exchange for outfielder Jesús Alou and first baseman Donn Clendenon. However, Clendenon refused to report to Houston, electing to retire and take job with a pen manufacturing company. The Astros asked Commissioner Bowie Kuhn to void the trade, but he refused. Instead, he awarded Jack Billingham and a left-handed relief pitcher to the Astros to complete the trade. Cuellar was traded to the Baltimore Orioles for Curt Blefary. Other new players included catcher Johnny Edwards, infielder Denis Menke and pitcher Denny Lemaster. Wilson continued to pitch brilliantly and on May 1 threw the second no-hitter of his career. In that game, he struck out 18 batters, tying what was then the all-time single-game mark. He was just 24 years of age and was second to only Sandy Koufax for career no-hit wins. Wilson's no-hitter lit the Astros' fire after a miserable month of April, and six days later the team tied a major league record by turning seven double plays in a game. By May's end, the Astros had put together a ten-game winning streak. The Houston infield tandem of Menke and Joe Morgan continued to improve, providing power at the plate and great defense. Morgan had 15 homers and stole 49 bases while Menke led the Astros with 90 RBIs. The Menke/Morgan punch was beginning to come alive, and the team was responding to Walker's management style. The Astros dominated the season series against their expansion twins, the New York Mets. In one game at New York, Denis Menke and Jimmy Wynn hit grand slams in the same inning, against a Mets team that would go on to win the World Series that same year. The Astros finished the 1969 season with a record of 81 wins, 81 losses, marking their first season of .500 ball.

In 1970, the Astros were expected to be a serious threat in the National League West. In June, 19-year-old César Cedeño was called up and immediately showed signs of being a superstar. The Dominican outfielder batted .310 after being called up. Not to be outdone, Menke batted .304 and Jesús Alou batted .306. The Astros' batting average was up by 19 points compared to the season before. The team looked good, but the Astros' ERA was up. Larry Dierker and Wilson had winning records, but the pitching staff as a whole had an off season. Houston finished in fourth place in 1970.

=== 1971–1974: The boys in orange ===
The fashion trends of the 1970s had started taking root in baseball. Long hair and loud colors were starting to appear on team uniforms, including the Astros'. In 1971 the Astros made some changes to their uniform: they kept the same style they had in previous seasons, but inverted the colors. What was navy was now orange and what was orange was now a lighter shade of blue. The players' last names were added to the back of the jerseys. In 1972, the uniform fabric was also changed to what was at the time revolutionizing the industry – polyester. Belts were replaced by elastic waistbands, and jerseys zipped up instead of having buttons. The uniforms became popular with fans, but would last only until 1975, when the Astros would shock baseball and the fashion world.

The uniforms were about the only thing that did change in 1971. The acquisition of Roger Metzger from the Chicago Cubs in the off-season moved Menke to first base and Bob Watson to the outfield. The Astros got off to a slow start and the pitching and hitting averages were down. Larry Dierker was selected to the All-Star Game in 1971, but due to an arm injury he could not make it. César Cedeño led the club with 81 RBIs and the league with 40 doubles, but batted just .264 and had 102 strikeouts in his second season with the Astros. Pitcher J. R. Richard made his debut in September of the 1971 season against the Giants.

==== The Big Trade ====
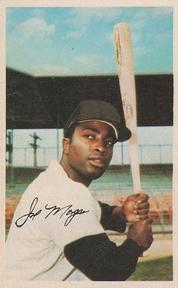
Hall of Famer Joe Morgan (1963–1971, 1980) was traded to Cincinnati following the 1971 season

In November 1971 the Astros and Cincinnati Reds made one of the biggest blockbuster trades in the history of the sport, and helped create The Big Red Machine of the 1970s, with the Reds getting the better end of the deal. Houston sent second baseman Joe Morgan, infielder Denis Menke, pitcher Jack Billingham, outfielder César Gerónimo and prospect Ed Armbrister to Cincinnati for first baseman Lee May, second baseman Tommy Helms and infielder Jimmy Stewart. The trade left Astros fans and the baseball world scratching their heads as to why general manager Spec Richardson would give up so much for so little. The Reds, on the other hand, would shore up many problems. They had an off year in 1971, but were the National League Pennant winner in 1972.

The Astros' acquisition of Lee May added more power to the lineup in 1972. May, Wynn, Rader and Cedeño all had 20 or more home runs and Watson hit 16. Cedeño also led the Astros with a .320 batting average, 55 stolen bases and made spectacular plays on the field. Cedeño made his first All-Star game in 1972 and became the first Astros player in team history to hit for the cycle in August versus the Reds. The Astros finished the strike-shortened season at 84–69, their first winning season.

Astros fans had hoped for more of the same in 1973, but it was not to be. The Astros run production was down, even though the same five sluggers the year before were still punching the ball out of the park. Lee May led the Astros with 28 home runs and Cesar Cedeño batted .320 with 25 home runs. Bob Watson hit the .312 mark and drove in 94 runs. Doug Rader and Jimmy Wynn both had 20 or more home runs. However, injuries to their pitching staff limited the Astros to an 82–80 fourth-place finish. The Astros again finished in fourth place the next year under new manager Preston Gómez.

=== 1975–1979: Cautious corporate ownership ===
With the $38 million debt (equivalent to $227 million in 2025) of the Astrodome, control of the Astrodomain (including the Astros) was passed from Roy Hofheinz to GE Credit and Ford Motor Credit. The creditors were just interested in preserving asset value of the team, so any money spent had to be found or saved somewhere else. Tal Smith returned to the Astros from the New York Yankees to find a team that needed a lot of work and did not have a lot of money. However, there would be some bright spots that would prove to be good investments in the near future.

The year started on a sad note. Pitcher Don Wilson was found dead in the passenger seat of his car on January 5, 1975; the cause of death was asphyxiation by carbon monoxide. Wilson was 29 years old; his number 40 was retired on April 13.

The 1975 season introduced new Astros uniforms, which followed the MLB trend away from traditional looks. From the chest down, the uniform was a solid block of yellow, orange, and red stripes. There was also a large dark blue star over the midsection. The same multi-colored stripes ran down the pant legs. Players' numbers appeared on the pant leg as well as the back of the jersey. The bright stripes were meant to appear as a fiery trail like a rocket sweeping across the heavens. The uniforms were panned by critics, but the public liked them and versions started appearing on high school and Little League teams. The Astros wore it at home and on the road until 1980.

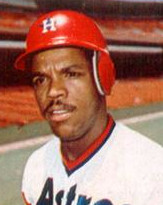
César Cedeño (1970–1981) is the franchise's all-time leader with 487 steals

Lee May was traded to Baltimore for much-talked-about rookie second baseman Rob Andrews and utility player Enos Cabell. In Baltimore, Cabell was stuck behind third baseman Brooks Robinson, but he took advantage of his opportunity in Houston and became their everyday third baseman. Cabell would become a big part of the team's success in later years. With May gone, Bob Watson moved to first base and was a bright spot in the lineup, batting .324 with 85 RBI.

The two biggest moves the Astros made in the offseason were the acquisitions of Joe Niekro and José Cruz. The Astros bought Niekro from the Braves for almost nothing. Niekro had bounced around the big leagues with minimal success. His older brother Phil Niekro had started teaching Joe how to throw his knuckleball and Joe was just starting to use it when he came to the Astros. Niekro won six games, saved four games and had an ERA of 3.07. Acquiring José Cruz from the Cardinals was another big win. Cruz became a fixture in the Astros' outfield for several years and would eventually have his number 25 retired.

Despite high expectations, 1975 was among the Astros' worst in franchise history. Their record of 64–97 was far worse than even the expansion Colt .45's and would remain the worst record in franchise history until 2011. It was the worst record in baseball and manager Preston Gómez was fired late in the season and replaced by Bill Virdon. The Astros played .500 ball under Virdon in the last 34 games of the season.

With Virdon as the manager, the Astros improved greatly in 1976 finishing in third place with an 80–82 record. A healthy César Cedeño was a key reason for the Astros' success in 1976. Bob Watson continued to show consistency and led the club with a .313 average and 102 RBI. José Cruz became Houston's everyday left fielder and hit .303 with 28 stolen bases. In Larry Dierker's last year as an Astro, he threw a no-hitter and won the 1,000th game in the Astrodome. The Astros finished in third place again in 1977 with a record of 81–81.

In the late 1970s, the Astros were unable to compete in the free-agent market because Ford Motor Credit Company was looking to sell the team, not invest in it. Most of the talent was either farm-grown or bought cheaply.

The 1979 season would be a turnaround in Astros history. During the offseason, the Astros attempted to fix some of their problem areas. They traded Floyd Bannister to Seattle for shortstop Craig Reynolds and acquired catcher Alan Ashby from Toronto for pitcher Mark Lemongello. Reynolds and Ashby were both solid in their positions and gave Houston some much-needed consistency. The season started with a boost from pitcher Ken Forsch, who threw a no-hitter against the Braves the second game of the season. In May 1979, New Jersey shipping tycoon John McMullen had agreed to buy the Astros. Now with an investor in charge, the Astros would be more likely to compete in the free-agent market.

The Astros were playing great baseball throughout the season. José Cruz and Enos Cabell both stole 30 bases. Joe Niekro had a great year with 21 wins and 3.00 ERA. J. R. Richard won 18 games and set a new personal strikeout record at 313. Joe Sambito came into his own with 22 saves as the Astros closer. Things were going as they should for a team that could win the west. The Astros and Reds battled the final month of the season. The Reds pulled ahead of the Astros by a game and a half. Later that month they split a pair and the Reds kept the lead. The Astros finished with their best record to that point at 89–73 and 1 1/2 games behind the NL winner Reds.

With Dr. McMullen as sole owner of the Astros, the team would now benefit in ways a corporation could not give them. The rumors of the Astros moving out of Houston started to crumble and the Astros were now able to compete in the free-agent market. McMullen showed the city of Houston that he too wanted a winning team, signing nearby Alvin, Texas native Nolan Ryan to the first million-dollar-a-year deal. Ryan had four career no-hitters already and had struck out 383 in one season.

=== 1980–1985: More rainbow, and seasons on the brink ===
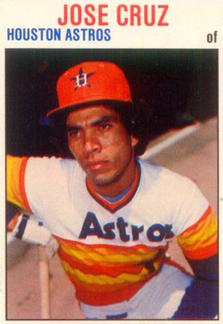
José Cruz (1975–1987), his #25 was retired by Houston

Joe Morgan returned in 1980. The 1980 pitching staff was one of the best Houston ever had, with the fastball of Ryan, the knuckleball of Joe Niekro and the terrifying 6 ft 8 in frame of J. R. Richard. Teams felt lucky to face Ken Forsch, who was a double-digit winner in the previous two seasons. Richard became the first Astros pitcher to start an All-Star game. Three days later, Richard was told to rest his arm after a medical examination and on July 30 he collapsed during a workout. He had suffered a stroke after a blood clot in the arm apparently moved to his neck and cut off blood flow to the brain. Surgery was done to save his life, but the Astros had lost their ace pitcher after a 10–4 start with a stingy 1.89 ERA. Richard attempted a comeback, but would never again pitch a big league game.

After the loss of Richard and some offensive struggles, the Astros slipped to third place in the division behind the Dodgers and the Reds. They bounced back to first with a ten-game winning streak, but the Dodgers regained a two-game lead before arriving in Houston on September 9. The Astros won the first two games of the series to tie the Dodgers for the division lead. The Astros went on to win a third game and take the lead- with three games against the Dodgers left. The Dodgers swept the next series, forcing a one-game playoff the next day. The Astros won the playoff game 7–1, and advanced to their first post-season.

The team would face the Philadelphia Phillies in the 1980 National League Championship Series. The Phillies sent out Steve Carlton in game one of the NLCS. The Phillies would win the opener after the Astros got out to a 1–0 third-inning lead. Ken Forsch pitched particularly strong fourth and fifth innings, but Greg Luzinski hit a sixth-inning two-run bomb to the 300 level seats of Veterans Stadium. The Phillies added an insurance run on the way to a 3–1 win. Houston bounced back to win games two and three. Game four went into extra innings, with the Phillies taking the lead and the win in the tenth inning. Pete Rose started a rally with a one-out single, then Luzinski doubled off the left-field wall and Rose bowled over catcher Bruce Bochy to score the go-ahead run. The Phillies got an insurance run on the way to tying the series.

Rookie Phillies pitcher Marty Bystrom was sent out by Philadelphia manager Dallas Green to face veteran Nolan Ryan in Game Five. The rookie gave up a run in the first inning, then held the Astros at bay until the sixth inning. An Astros lead was lost when Bob Boone hit a two-out single in the second, but the Astros tied the game in the sixth with an Alan Ashby single scoring Denny Walling. Houston took a 5–2 lead in the seventh; however, the Phillies came back with five runs in the inning. The Astros came back against Tug McGraw with four singles and two two-out runs. Now in extra innings, Garry Maddox doubled in Del Unser with one out to give the Phillies an 8–7 lead. The Astros failed to score in the bottom of the tenth.

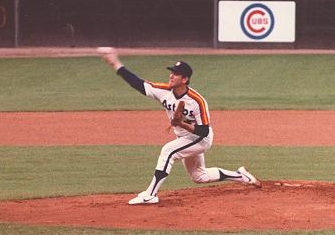
Astros starting pitcher Nolan Ryan in 1983

A 1981 player strike ran between June 12 and August 10. Ultimately, the strike would help the Astros get into the playoffs. Nolan Ryan and Bob Knepper picked up steam in the second half of the season. Ryan threw his fifth no-hitter on September 26 and finished the season with a 1.69 ERA. Knepper finished with an ERA of 2.18. In the wake of the strike, Major League Baseball took the winners of each "half" season and set up a best-of-five divisional playoff. The Reds won more games than any other team in the National League, but they won neither half of the strike-divided season. The Astros finished 61–49 overall, which would have been third in the division behind the Reds and the Dodgers. Advancing to the playoffs as winners of the second half, Houston beat Los Angeles in their first two playoff games at home, but the Dodgers took the next three in Los Angeles to advance to the NLCS.

By 1982, only four players and three starting pitchers remained from the 1980 squad. The Astros were out of pennant contention by August and began rebuilding for the near future. Bill Virdon was fired as manager and replaced by original Colt .45 Bob Lillis. Don Sutton asked to be traded and was sent to the Milwaukee Brewers for cash and the team gained three new prospects, including Kevin Bass. Minor league player Bill Doran was called up in September. The Astros finished fourth in the west, but new talent was starting to appear.

Before the 1983 season, the Astros traded Danny Heep to the Mets for pitcher Mike Scott, a 28-year-old who had struggled with New York. Art Howe sat out the 1983 season with an injury, forcing Phil Garner to third and Ray Knight to first. Doran took over at second, becoming the everyday second baseman for the next seven seasons. The Astros finished third in the National League West. The 1984 season started off badly when shortstop Dickie Thon was hit in the head by a pitch and was lost for the season. In September, the Astros called up rookie Glenn Davis after he posted impressive numbers in AAA. The Astros finished in second place. In 1985, Mike Scott learned a new pitch, the split-finger fastball. Scott, who was coming off of a 5–11 season, had found his new pitch and would become one of Houston's most celebrated hurlers. In June, Davis made the starting lineup at first base, adding power to the team. In September, Joe Niekro was traded to the Yankees for two minor league pitchers and lefty Jim Deshaies. The Astros finished in fourth place in 1985.

=== 1986–1990: A deep run, and building for the future ===
After finishing fourth in 1985, the Astros fired general manager Al Rosen and manager Bob Lillis. The former was supplanted by Dick Wagner, the man whose Reds defeated the Astros to win the 1979 NL West title. The latter was replaced by Hal Lanier who, like his manager mentor in St. Louis, Whitey Herzog, had a hard-nosed approach to managing and espoused a playing style that focused on pitching, defense, and speed rather than home runs to win games. This style of baseball, known as Whiteyball, took advantage of stadiums with deep fences and artificial turf, both of which were characteristics of the Astrodome. Lanier's style of baseball took Houston by storm. Before Lanier took over, fans were accustomed to Houston's occasional slow starts, but with Lanier leading the way, Houston got off to a hot start, winning 13 of their first 19 contests.

Before the season, the Astros acquired outfielder Billy Hatcher from the Cubs for Jerry Mumphrey. Lainer changed the pitching staff, going with a three-man rotation to start the season. This allowed Lanier to keep his three starters (Nolan Ryan, Bob Knepper, and Mike Scott) sharp and to slowly work in rookie hurler Jim Deshaies. Bill Doran and Glenn Davis held down the right side of the field but Lainer rotated the left side. Denny Walling and Craig Reynolds faced the right-handed pitchers while Phil Garner and Dickie Thon batted against left-handers.

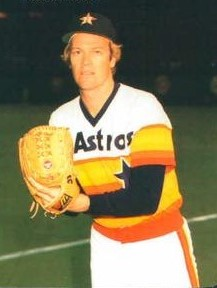
Mike Scott won the 1986 NL Cy Young Award and NLCS MVP

The Astrodome was host to the 1986 All-Star Game in which Astros Mike Scott, Kevin Bass, Glenn Davis, and Dave Smith represented the host field. The Astros kept pace with the NL West after the All-Star break. They went on a streak of five straight come-from-behind wins. Houston swept a key 3-game series over the San Francisco Giants in late September to clinch the division title. Mike Scott took the mound in the final game of the series and pitched a no-hitter, a feat that remains the only time an MLB division was clinched via a no-hitter. Scott finished the season with an 18–10 record and a Cy Young Award.

The 1986 National League Championship Series against the New York Mets was noted for its drama and is considered to be one of the greatest postseason series. In Game 3, the Astros were ahead at Shea Stadium, 5–4, in the bottom of the 9th when closer Dave Smith gave up a two-run home run to Lenny Dykstra, giving the Mets a dramatic 6–5 win.

The signature game of the series was Game 6. Needing a win to enable the series-dominating Scott to pitch Game 7, the Astros jumped off to a 3–0 lead in the first inning but neither team would score again until the 9th inning. In the 9th, starting pitcher Bob Knepper gave up two runs, and once again the Astros looked to Dave Smith to close it out. However, Smith walked Gary Carter and Darryl Strawberry, giving up a sacrifice fly to Ray Knight, tying the game. Despite having the go-ahead runs on base, Smith escaped the inning without any further damage.

There was no scoring until the 14th inning when the Mets took the lead on a Wally Backman single and an error by left fielder Billy Hatcher. The Astros would get the run back in the bottom of the 14th when Hatcher (in a classic goat-to-hero-conversion-moment) hit one of the most dramatic home runs in NLCS history, off the left-field foul pole. In the 16th inning, Darryl Strawberry doubled to lead off the inning and Ray Knight drove him home in the next at-bat. The Mets would score a total of three runs in the inning to take what appeared an insurmountable 7–4 lead. With their season on the line, the Astros would nonetheless rally for two runs to come to within 7–6. Kevin Bass came up with the tying and winning runs on base; however Jesse Orosco would strike him out, ending the game. At the time the 16-inning game held the record for the longest in MLB postseason history. The Mets won the series, 4–2.

After the 1986 season, the team had difficulty finding success again. Several changes occurred. The "rainbow" uniforms were phased out, the team electing to keep a five-stripe "rainbow" design on the sleeves. Team favorites Nolan Ryan and José Cruz moved on and the team entered a rebuilding phase. Craig Biggio debuted in June 1988, joining new prospects Ken Caminiti and Gerald Young. Biggio would become the everyday catcher by 1990. A trade acquiring Jeff Bagwell in exchange for Larry Andersen would become one of the biggest deals in Astros history. Glenn Davis was traded to Baltimore for Curt Schilling, Pete Harnisch and Steve Finley in 1990.

=== 1991–1999: Fine tuning and first rebranding ===
The early 1990s were marked by the Astros' growing discontent with their home, the Astrodome. After the Astrodome was renovated for the primary benefit of the NFL's Houston Oilers (who shared the Astrodome with the Astros since the 1960s), the Astros began to grow increasingly disenchanted with the facility. Faced with declining attendance at the Astrodome and the inability of management to obtain a new stadium, in the 1991 off-season Astros management announced its intention to sell the team and move the franchise to the Washington, D.C. area. However, the move was not approved by other National League owners, thus compelling the Astros to remain in Houston. Shortly thereafter, McMullen (who also owned the NHL's New Jersey Devils) sold the team to Texas businessman Drayton McLane in 1993, who committed to keeping the team in Houston.

Shortly after McLane's arrival, which coincided with the maturation of Bagwell and Biggio, the Astros began to show signs of consistent success. After finishing second in their division in 1994 (in a strike year), 1995, and 1996, the Astros won consecutive division titles in 1997, 1998, and 1999. In the 1998 season, the Astros set a team record with 102 victories. However, each of these titles was followed by a first-round playoff elimination, in 1998 by the San Diego Padres and in 1997 and 1999 against the Atlanta Braves. The manager of these title teams was Larry Dierker, who had previously been a broadcaster and pitcher for the Astros. During this period, Bagwell, Biggio, Derek Bell, and Sean Berry earned the collective nickname "The Killer Bs". In later seasons, the name came to include other Astros, especially Lance Berkman.

Coinciding with the change in ownership, the team switched uniforms and team colors after the 1993 season in order to go for a new, more serious image. The team's trademark rainbow uniforms were retired, and the team's colors changed to midnight blue and metallic gold. The "Astros" font on the team logo was changed to a more aggressive one, and the team's traditional star logo was changed to a stylized, "flying" star with an open left end. It marked the first time since the team's inception that orange was not part of the team's colors. Despite general agreement that the rainbow uniforms identified with the team had become tired (and looked too much like a minor league team according to the new owners), the new uniforms and caps were never especially popular with many Astros fans.

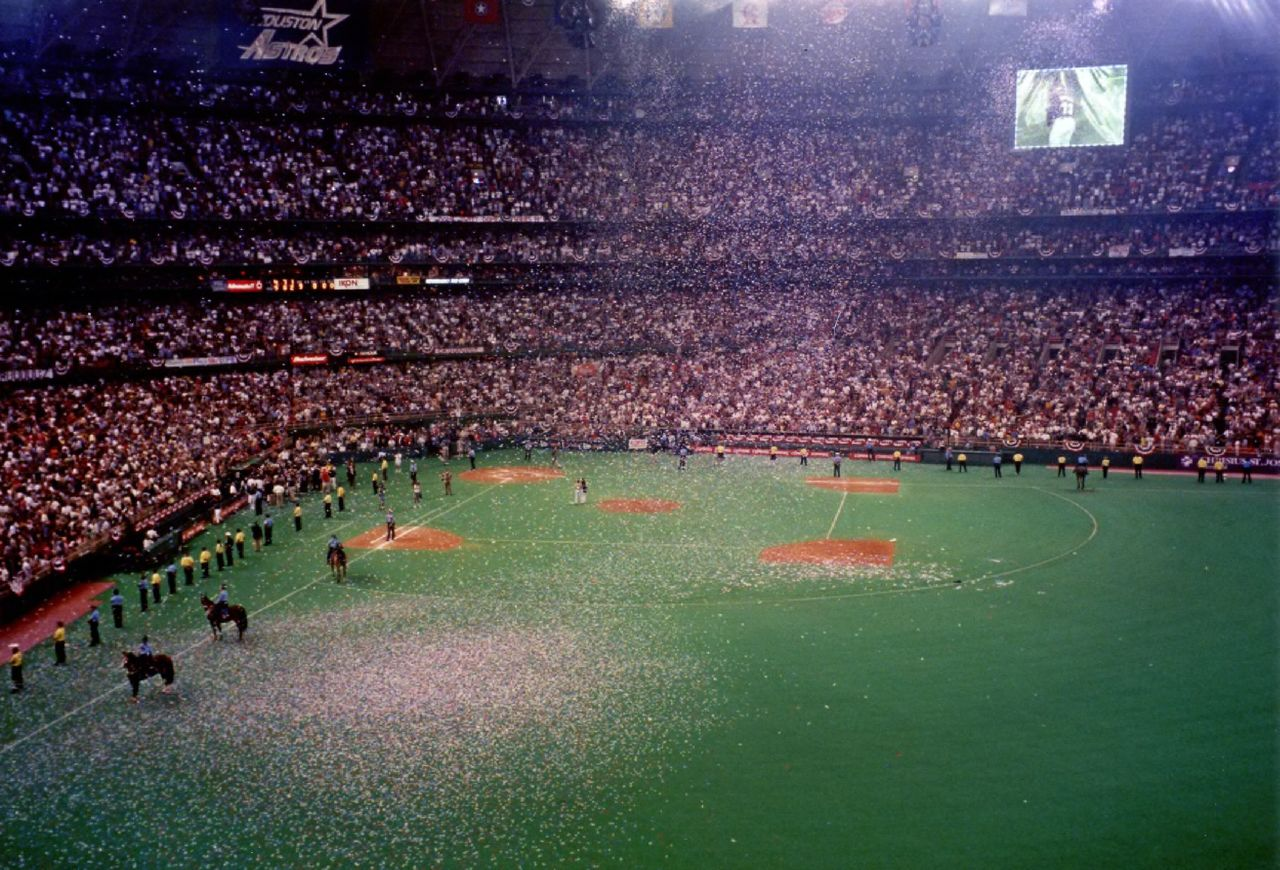
Final Astros regular season game in the Astrodome on October 3, 1999

Off the field, in 1994, the Astros hired one of the first African American general managers, former franchise player Bob Watson. Watson would leave the Astros after the 1995 season to become general manager of the New York Yankees and helped to lead the Yankees to a World Series championship in 1996. He would be replaced by Gerry Hunsicker, who until 2004 would continue to oversee the building of the Astros into one of the better and most consistent organizations in the Major Leagues.

However, in 1996, the Astros again nearly left Houston. By the mid-1990s, McLane (like McMullen before him) wanted his team out of the Astrodome and was asking the city to build the Astros a new stadium. When things did not progress quickly toward that end, he put the team up for sale. He had nearly finalized a deal to sell the team to businessman William Collins, who planned to move them to Northern Virginia. However, Collins was having difficulty finding a site for a stadium himself, so Major League owners stepped in and forced McLane to give Houston another chance to grant his stadium wish. Houston voters, having already lost the Houston Oilers in a similar situation, responded positively via a stadium referendum and the Astros stayed put.

=== 2000–2004: New ballpark and second rebranding ===
The 2000 season saw a move to a new stadium. Originally to be named The Ballpark at Union Station due to being located on the site of Union Station, it was renamed Enron Field by the season opening after the naming rights were sold to energy corporation Enron. The stadium was to feature a retractable roof, a particularly useful feature with unpredictable Houston weather. The ballpark also featured more intimate surroundings than the Astrodome. In 2002, naming rights were purchased by Houston-based Minute Maid, after Enron went bankrupt. The park was built on the grounds of the old Union Station. A replica 4-4-0 locomotive moves across the outfield and whistles after home runs, paying homage to a Houston history which had 11 railroad company lines running through the city by 1860. The ballpark previously contained quirks such as "Tal's Hill", which was a hill in deep center field on which a flagpole stood, all in fair territory. Over the years, many highlight reel catches have been made by center fielders running up the hill to make catches. Tal's Hill was removed in the 2016–2017 offseason and the center field wall was moved in to 409 feet (125 m), which the team hoped would generate more home runs.

With the change in location also came a change in attire. Gone were the blue and gold uniforms of the 1990s in favor of a more "retro" look with pinstripes, a traditional baseball font, and the colors of brick red, sand and black. These colors were chosen because ownership originally wanted to rename the team the Houston Diesels. The "shooting star" logo was modified but still retained its definitive look.

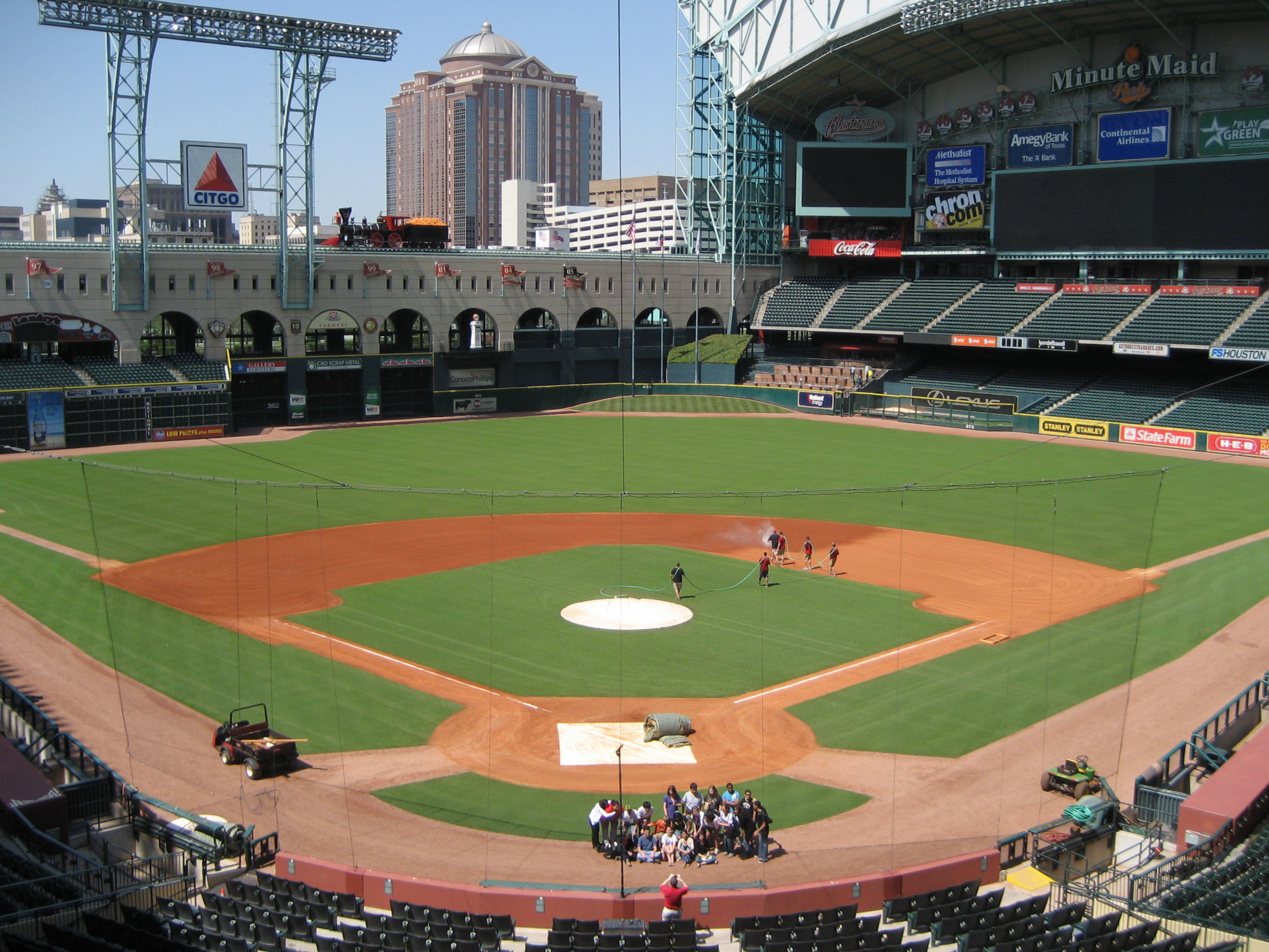
The Astros moved into Minute Maid Park in 2000

After two fairly successful seasons without a playoff appearance, the Astros were early favorites to win the 2004 NL pennant. They added star pitcher Andy Pettitte to a roster that already included standouts like Lance Berkman and Jeff Kent as well as veterans Bagwell and Biggio. Roger Clemens, who had retired after the 2003 season with the New York Yankees, agreed to join former teammate Pettitte on the Astros for 2004. The one-year deal included unique conditions, such as the option for Clemens to stay home in Houston on select road trips when he wasn't scheduled to pitch. Despite the early predictions for success, the Astros had a mediocre 44–44 record at the All-Star break. A lack of run production and a poor record in close games were major issues. After being booed at the 2004 All-Star Game held in Houston, manager Jimy Williams was fired and replaced by Phil Garner, a star on the division-winning 1986 Astros. The Astros enjoyed a 46–26 record in the second half of the season under Garner and earned the NL wild-card spot. The Astros defeated the Braves 3–2 in the Division Series, but would lose the National League Championship Series to the St. Louis Cardinals in seven games. Clemens earned a record seventh Cy Young Award in 2004. Additionally, the mid-season addition of Carlos Beltrán in a trade with the Kansas City Royals helped the Astros tremendously in their playoff run. Despite midseason trade rumors, Beltrán would prove instrumental to the team's hopes, hitting eight home runs in the postseason. Though he had asserted a desire to remain with the Astros, Beltrán signed a long-term contract with the New York Mets on January 9, 2005.

=== 2005: First World Series played in Texas ===
In 2005, the Astros started poorly and found themselves with a 15–30 record in late May. The Houston Chronicle had written them off with a tombstone emblazoned with "RIP 2005 Astros". However, from that low point until the end of July, Houston went 42–17 and found themselves in the lead for an NL wild card spot. July saw the best single-month record in the club's history at 22–7. Offensive production had increased greatly after a slow start in the first two months. The Astros had also developed an excellent pitching staff, anchored by Roy Oswalt (20–12, 2.94), Andy Pettitte (17–9, 2.39), and Roger Clemens (13–8 with a league-low ERA of only 1.87). The contributions of the other starters—Brandon Backe (10–8, 4.76) and rookie starters Ezequiel Astacio (3–6, 5.67) and Wandy Rodríguez (10–10, 5.53)—were less remarkable, but enough to push the Astros into position for a playoff run. The Astros won a wild card berth on the final day of the regular season, becoming the first team since the World Series champion 1914 Boston Braves to qualify for the postseason after being 15 games under .500.

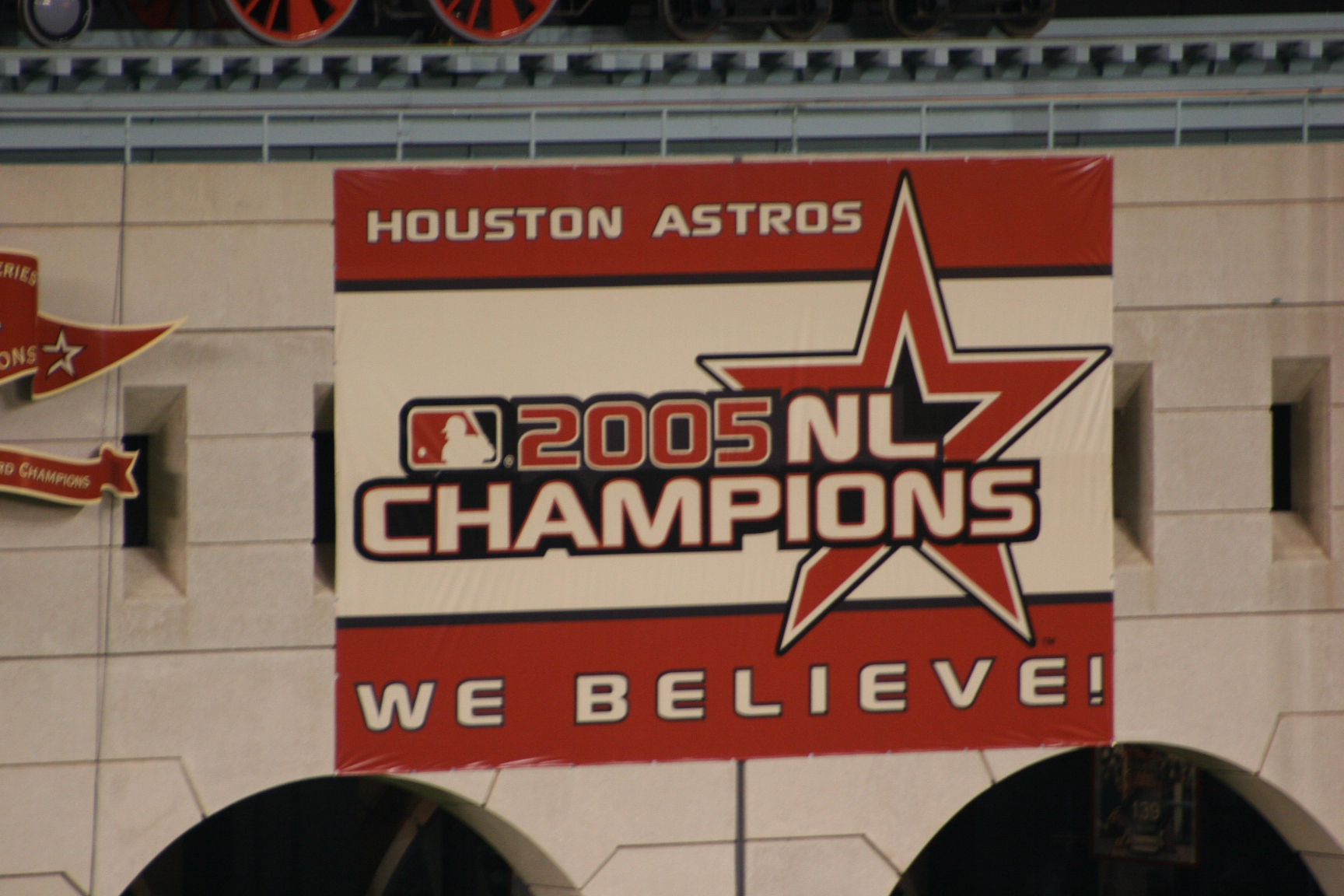
2005 National League championship banner at Minute Maid Park

The Astros won the National League Division Series against the Atlanta Braves, 3–1, with a game four that set postseason records for most innings (18), most players used by a single team (23), and longest game time (5 hours and 50 minutes). Trailing by a score of 6–1, Lance Berkman hit an eighth-inning grand slam to narrow the score to 6–5. In the bottom of the ninth, catcher Brad Ausmus hit a game-tying home run that allowed the game to continue in extra innings. In the bottom of the tenth inning, Luke Scott hit a blast to left field that had home run distance, but was inches foul. This game remained scoreless for the next eight innings. In the top of the 15th inning, Roger Clemens made only his second career relief appearance, pitching three shutout innings, notably striking out Julio Franco, at the time the oldest player in MLB at 47 years old; Clemens was himself 43. In the bottom of the eighteenth inning, Clemens came to bat again, indicating that he would be pitching in the nineteenth inning, if it came to that. Clemens struck out, but the next batter, Chris Burke, hit a home run to left field to send the Astros to a 7–6 victory. The National League Championship Series featured a rematch of the 2004 NLCS. The Astros lost the first game in St. Louis, but would win the next three games. Though the Astros were poised to close out the series in Game Five in Houston, Brad Lidge gave up a monstrous two-out three-run home run to Albert Pujols, forcing the series to a sixth game in St. Louis, where the Astros clinched a World Series appearance. Roy Oswalt was named NLCS MVP, having gone 2–0 with a 1.29 ERA in the series. Honorary National League President Bill Giles presented the league champion Astros with the Warren C. Giles Trophy (named for his father) for winning the series; the younger Giles had been one of the founders of the original Colt 45 team in 1962, while his father Warren had been president of the National League from 1951 to 1969.

The Astros faced the Chicago White Sox in the World Series. Chicago had been considered the slight favorite but would win all four games, the first two at U.S. Cellular Field in Chicago and the final two in Houston. Game 3 marked the first World Series game held in the state of Texas, and was the longest game in World Series history, lasting 5 hours and 41 minutes.

This World Series was marked by a controversy involving the Minute Maid Park roof. MLB and Commissioner Bud Selig insisted that the Astros must play with the roof open, which mitigated the intensity and enthusiasm of the cheering Astros fans.

=== 2006–2009: The decline ===
In the 2006 offseason, the team signed Preston Wilson and moved Berkman to first base, ending the long tenure of Jeff Bagwell. The Astros renewed the contract with Clemens and traded two minor league prospects to the Tampa Bay Devil Rays for left-handed hitter Aubrey Huff. By August, Preston Wilson complained about his playing time after the return of Luke Scott from AAA Round Rock. The Astros released Wilson and he was signed by St. Louis. A dramatic season end included wins in 10 of their last 12 games, but the Astros missed a playoff appearance when they lost the final game of the season to the Atlanta Braves.

On October 31, the Astros declined a contract option on Jeff Bagwell for 2007, ending his 15-year Astros career and leading to his retirement. Roger Clemens and Andy Pettitte filed for free agency. On December 12, the Astros traded Willy Taveras, Taylor Buchholz, and Jason Hirsh to the Colorado Rockies for Rockies pitchers Jason Jennings and Miguel Asencio. A trade with the White Sox, involving the same three Astros in exchange for Jon Garland, had been nixed a few days earlier when Buchholz reportedly failed a physical. In the end, Taveras continued to develop and Hirsh had a strong 2007 rookie campaign, while Jennings was often injured and generally ineffective.

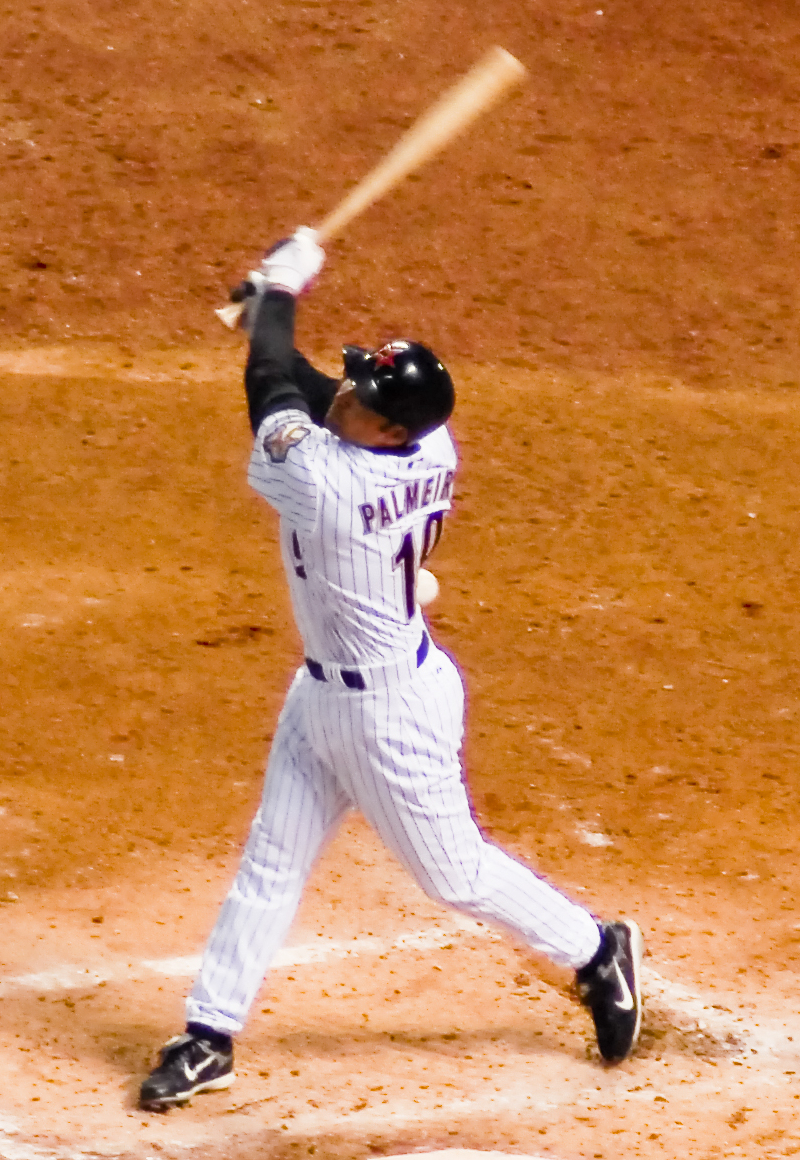
Astros' outfielder Orlando Palmeiro, 2007

On April 28, 2007, the Astros purchased the contract of top minor league prospect Hunter Pence. He debuted that night, getting a hit and scoring a run. By May 2007, the Astros had suffered one of their worst losing streaks (10 games). On June 28, second baseman Craig Biggio became the 27th MLB player to accrue 3,000 career hits. Biggio needed three hits to reach 3,000 and ended the night with a total of five hits. That night, Carlos Lee hit a towering walk-off grand slam in the 11th inning. Lee later quipped to the media that "he had hit a walk-off grand slam and he got second billing", considering Biggio's achievement. On July 24, Biggio announced that he would retire at the end of the season. He hit a grand slam in that night's game which broke a 3–3 tie and led to an Astros win. In Biggio's last at bat, he grounded out to Chipper Jones of the Atlanta Braves.

On September 20, Ed Wade was named general manager. In his first move, he traded Jason Lane to the Padres on September 24. On September 30, Craig Biggio retired after twenty years with the team. In November, the Astros traded RHP Brad Lidge and SS Eric Bruntlett to the Philadelphia Phillies for OF Michael Bourn, RHP Geoff Geary, and minor leaguer Mike Costanzo. Utility player Mark Loretta accepted Houston's salary arbitration and Kazuo Matsui finalized a $16.5 million, three-year contract with the team. In December, the Astros traded OF Luke Scott, RHP Matt Albers, RHP Dennis Sarfate, LHP Troy Patton, and minor-league 3B Mike Costanzo, to the Baltimore Orioles for SS Miguel Tejada. On December 14, they sent infielder Chris Burke, RHP Juan Gutiérrez, and RHP Chad Qualls to the Arizona Diamondbacks for RHP José Valverde. On December 27, the Astros came to terms on a deal with All-Star, Gold Glove winner Darin Erstad.

In January and February 2008, the Astros signed Brandon Backe, Ty Wigginton, Dave Borkowski and Shawn Chacón to one-year deals. The starting rotation would feature Roy Oswalt and Brandon Backe as numbers one and two. Wandy Rodríguez, Chacón and Chris Sampson rounded out the bottom three slots in the rotation. Woody Williams had retired after a 0–4 spring training and Jason Jennings was now with Texas. On the other side of the roster, the Astros would start without Kazuo Matsui, who was on a minor league rehab assignment after a spring training injury.

The Astros regressed in 2008 and 2009, finishing with records of 86–75 and 74–88, respectively. Manager Cecil Cooper was fired after the 2009 season. At the lowest point of the regression, child admission was free.

=== 2010–2014: Last years in the NL and move to the AL West ===
The 2010 season was the first season as Astros manager for Brad Mills, who was previously the bench coach of the Boston Red Sox. The Astros struggled throughout a season that was marked by trade-deadline deals that sent longtime Astros to other teams. On July 29, the Astros' ace starting pitcher, Roy Oswalt, was dealt to the Philadelphia Phillies for J. A. Happ and two minor league players. On July 31, outfielder Lance Berkman was traded to the New York Yankees for minor leaguers Jimmy Paredes and Mark Melancon. The Astros finished with a record of 76–86.

On July 30, 2011, the Astros traded OF Hunter Pence, the team's 2010 leader in home runs, to the Philadelphia Phillies. On July 31, they traded OF Michael Bourn to the Atlanta Braves. On September 17, the Astros recorded their first 100-loss season in franchise history, ending the season eleven days later with an 8–0 home loss to the St. Louis Cardinals. Cardinals pitcher Chris Carpenter pitched a two-hit complete game shutout. The Cardinals would go on to win the National League Wild Card, before beating the Texas Rangers in the World Series. Lance Berkman, who was now a Cardinal, was a key player in their championship victory. The Astros finished with a record of 56–106, the worst single-season record in franchise history (a record which would be broken the following season).

In November 2010, Drayton McLane announced that the Astros were being put up for sale. McLane stated that because the Astros were one of the few franchises in Major League Baseball with only one family as the owners, he was planning his estate. McLane was 75 years old as of November 2011. In March 2011, local Houston businessman Jim Crane emerged as the front-runner to purchase the franchise. In the 1980s, Crane founded an air freight business which later merged with CEVA Logistics, and later founded Crane Capital Group. McLane and Crane had a previous handshake agreement for the franchise in 2008, but Crane abruptly changed his mind and broke off discussions. Crane also attempted to buy the Chicago Cubs in 2008 and the Texas Rangers during their 2010 bankruptcy auction. Crane came under scrutiny because of previous allegations of discriminatory hiring practices regarding women and minorities, among other issues. This delayed MLB's approval process. In the summer of 2011, Crane claimed those issues had been resolved, and suggested that the delays were baseball's attempt to move the Astros to the American League. In October later that year, Crane met personally with MLB Commissioner Bud Selig, in a meeting that was described as "constructive".

On November 15, 2011, it was announced that Crane had agreed to move the franchise to the American League for the 2013 season. The move was part of an overall divisional realignment of MLB, with the National and American leagues each having 15 teams in three geographically balanced divisions. Crane was given a $70 million concession by MLB for agreeing to the switch; the move was a condition for the sale to the new ownership group. Two days later, the Astros were officially sold to Crane for $615 million after the other owners unanimously voted in favor of the sale. It was also announced that 2012 would be the last season for the Astros in the NL. After over fifty years of the Astros being a part of the National League, this move was unpopular with many Astros fans. In December 2011, Jeff Luhnow was named general manager.

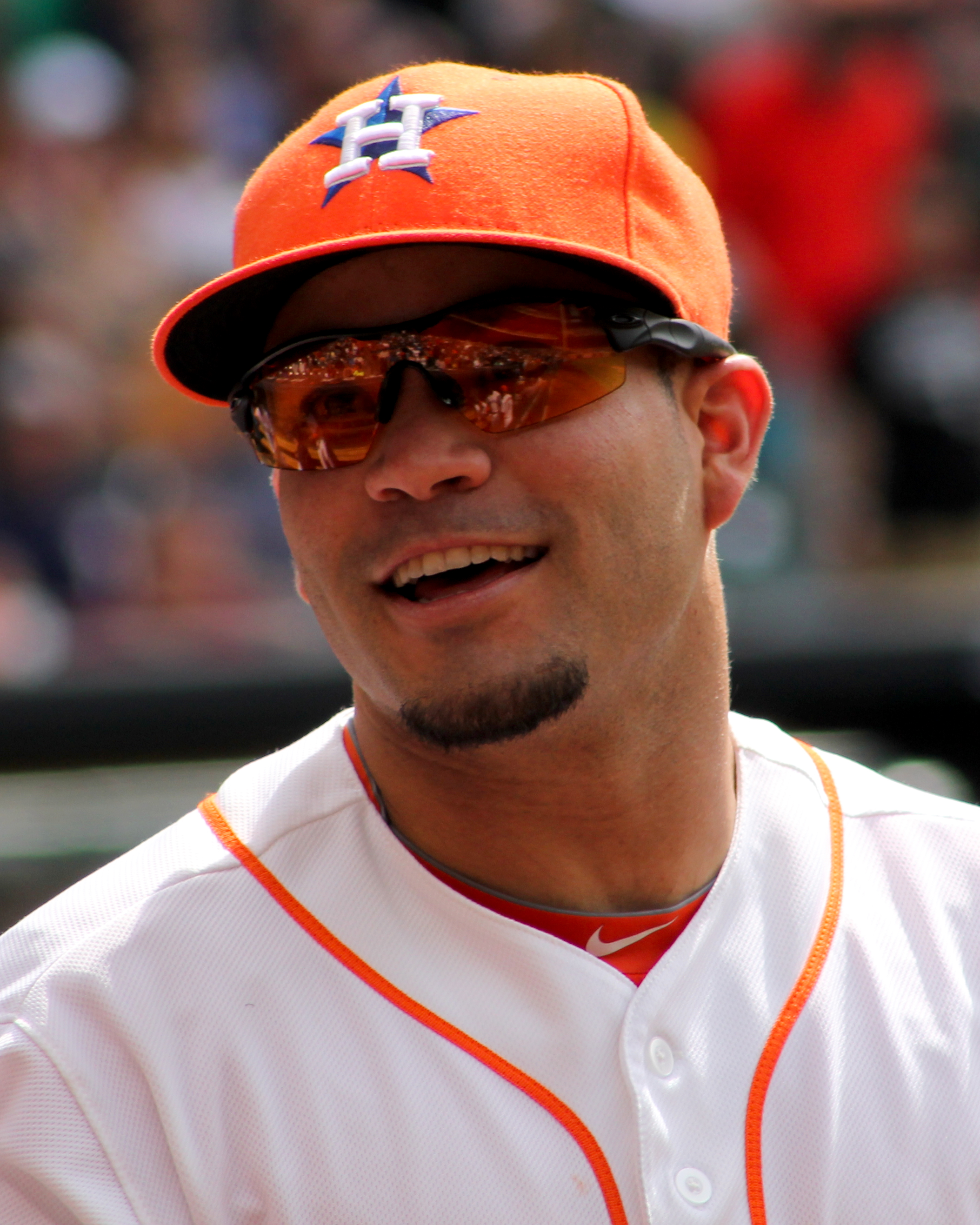
Astros second baseman Jose Altuve in 2014

In 2012, the Astros were eliminated from the playoffs before September 5. On September 27, the Astros named Bo Porter to be the manager for the 2013 season.

On October 3, the Astros ended over 50 years of NL play with a 5–4 loss to the Chicago Cubs and began to look ahead to join the American League. Winning only 20 road games during the entire season, the Astros finished with a 55–107 record, the worst record in all of Major League Baseball for the 2012 season, and surpassing the 2011 season for the worst record in Astros history.

On November 2, 2012, the Astros unveiled their new look in preparation for their move to the American League for the 2013 season. The navy and orange uniform returned to the original 1960s team colors, and debuted a new version of the classic navy hat with a white "H" over an orange star.

On November 6, 2012, the Astros hired former Cleveland Indians director of baseball operations David Stearns as the team's new assistant general manager.

The Houston Astros played their first game as an American League team on March 31, 2013, where they were victorious over their in-state division competitor, the Texas Rangers, with a score of 8–2.

On May 17, Reid Ryan, son of Nolan Ryan was introduced as president of operations.

On September 29, the Astros completed their first year in the American League, losing 5–1 in a 14-inning game to the New York Yankees. The Astros finished the season with a 51–111 record (a franchise-worst) with a season-ending 15-game losing streak, again surpassing their worst record from the previous season. The team finished 45 games behind the division winner Oakland Athletics, further adding to their futility. This marked three consecutive years that the Astros had lost more than 100 games in a single season. They also became the first team to have the first overall pick in the draft three years in a row.

In February 2014, Nolan Ryan rejoined the Astros front office as assistant to owner Jim Crane, GM Jeff Luhnow and president of business operations Reid Ryan. From 2004 through 2008 he worked as a special assistant to the GM.

For the 2014 season the team went 70–92, finishing 28 games back of the division winner Los Angeles Angels of Anaheim, and placing fourth in the AL West over the Texas Rangers.

A. J. Hinch was named manager on September 29, replacing Bo Porter, who was fired on September 1.

=== 2015–2019: Return to success, first World Series title and scandal ===
In 2015, Dallas Keuchel led the AL with 20 victories, going 15–0 at home, an MLB record. Key additions to the team included Scott Kazmir and SS Carlos Correa who hit 22 home runs after being called up in June 2015. Second baseman Jose Altuve remained the star of the Astros' offense. On July 30, the Astros picked up Mike Fiers and Carlos Gómez from the Milwaukee Brewers. Fiers threw the 11th no-hitter in Astros history on August 21 against the Los Angeles Dodgers. Houston got the final AL playoff spot and faced the Yankees in the Wild Card Game on October 6 at New York. They defeated the Yankees 3–0, including 6.0 scoreless innings pitched by Keuchel and home runs by Colby Rasmus and Carlos Gómez.

The Astros would subsequently play the AL Central champion Kansas City Royals. The Astros would split the first two games of the ALDS best-of-five series in Kansas City. The Astros won the first game at Minute Maid to take a 2–1 lead in the ALDS. In Game 4, after 7 innings, the Astros had a 6–2 lead. In the top half of the eighth inning, which took about 45 minutes to end, the Royals had taken a 7–6 lead with 5 consecutive singles and a notable error from SS Carlos Correa which tied the game as well as allowed the winning run to reach base. The Astros suffered a 9–6 loss and the ALDS was tied at 2–2. Then the series went back to Kansas City, where the Royals clinched the series in the fifth game, 7–2.

The Astros entered the 2016 season as the favorites to win the AL West after a promising 2015 season. After a bad start to their season, going just 7–17 in April, the Astros bounced back and went on to have a winning record in their next four months, including an 18–8 record in June. But after going 12–15 in September, the Astros were eliminated from playoff contention. They finished in third place in the American League West Division with a final record of 84–78.

The season was marked by the Astros 4–15 record against their in-state division rival (and eventual division winner) Texas Rangers. The Astros finished the 2016 season 11 games behind the Rangers.

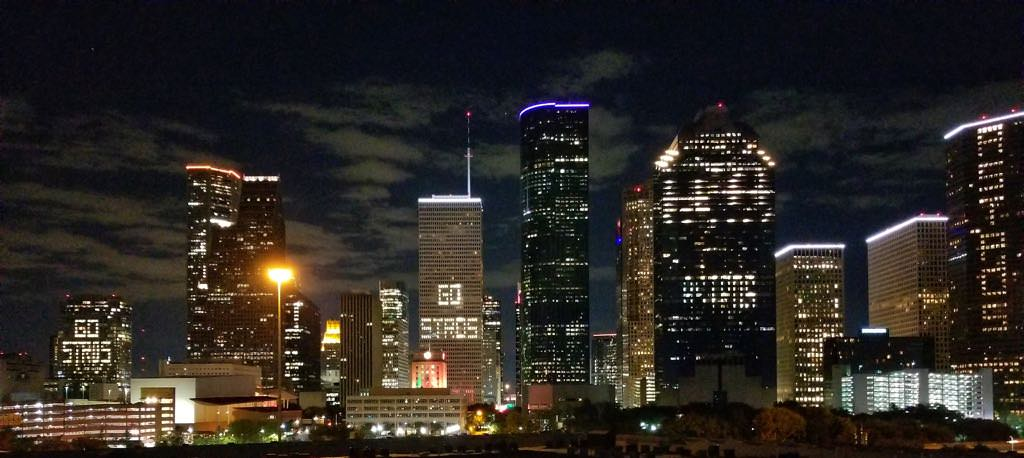
Many buildings in the skyline of Downtown Houston participated in cheering for the Astros during the 2017 World Series.

In 2014, Sports Illustrated predicted the Astros would win the 2017 World Series through their strategic rebuilding process. As of June 9, 2017, the Astros were 41–16, which gave them a 13.5-game lead over the rest of their division and comfortable possession of the best record in the entire league. This was the best start in the Astros' 55-year history. The Astros entered the All-Star Break with an American League-best 60–29 record, a 16-game lead in the division, and one game shy of the best record in MLB, which had just barely slipped to the Dodgers right before the All-Star Break.

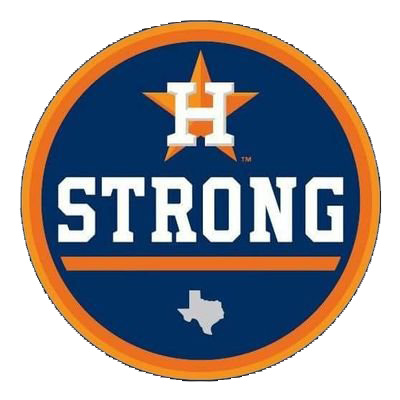
The Houston Astros began wearing this patch during the 2017 season as the Houston area recovered from the destruction caused by Hurricane Harvey.

With Hurricane Harvey causing massive flooding throughout Houston and southeast Texas, the Astros' three-game series against the Texas Rangers for August 29–31, was moved to Tropicana Field (home of the Tampa Bay Rays), in St. Petersburg, Florida. As the area recovered from the hurricane, many residents rallied around the Astros, who adopted the mantra "Houston Strong". They wore a patch on their jerseys with the mantra for the remainder of the season.

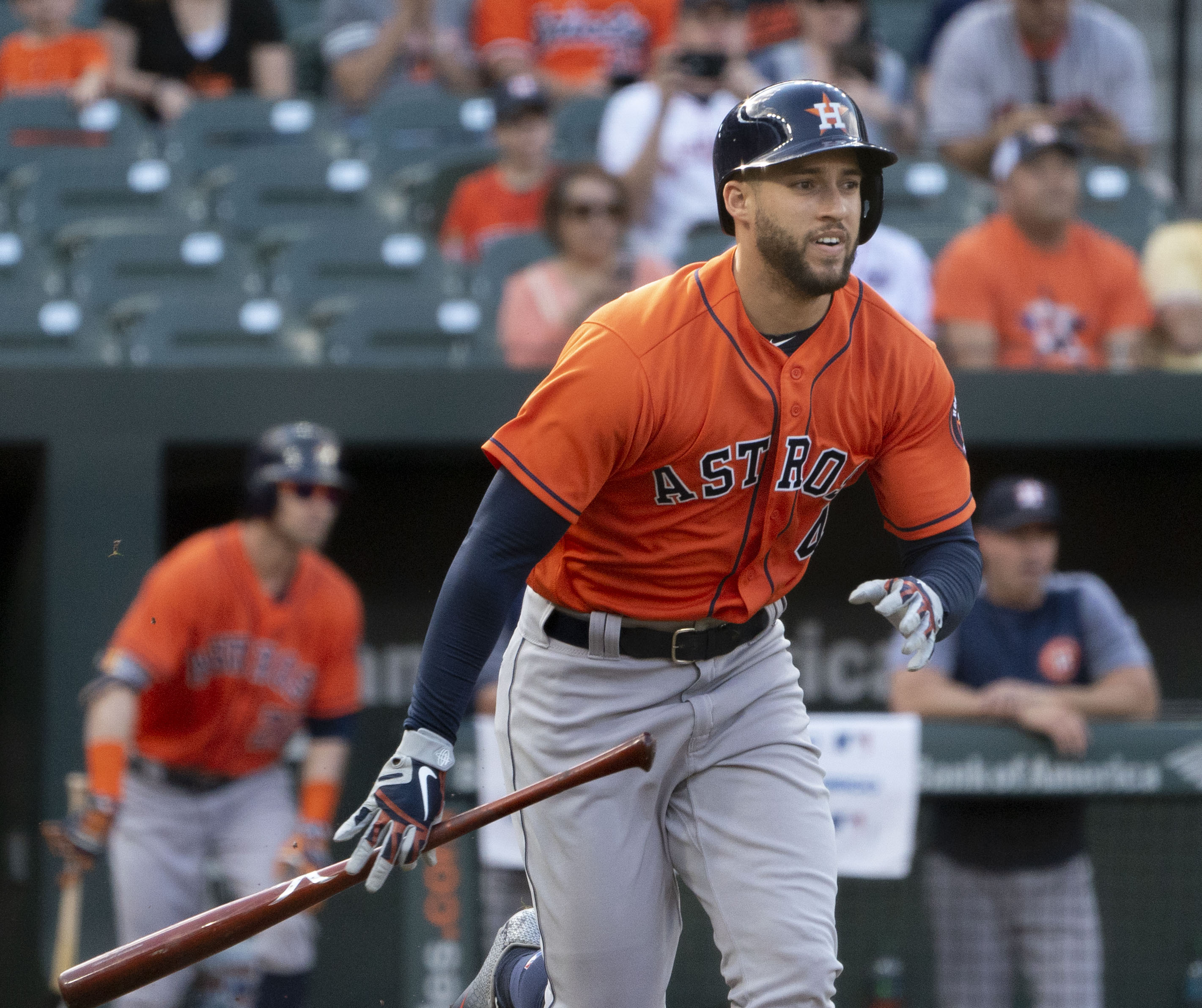
2017 World Series MVP - George Springer

At the August 31 waiver-trade deadline GM Jeff Luhnow acquired veteran starting pitcher and Cy Young Award winner Justin Verlander to bolster the starting rotation. Verlander won each of his 5 regular season starts with the Astros, yielding only 4 runs over this stretch. He carried his success into the playoffs, posting a record of 4–1 in his 6 starts, and throwing a complete game in Game 2 of the ALCS. Verlander was named the 2017 ALCS MVP.

The Astros clinched their first division title as a member of the American League West division, and first division title overall since 2001. They also became the first team in Major League history to win three different divisions: National League West in 1980 and 1986, National League Central from 1997 to 1999 and 2001, and American League West in 2017. On September 29, the Astros won their 100th game of the season, the second time the Astros finished a season with over 100 wins, the first being in 1998. They finished 101–61, with a 21-game lead in the division, and faced the Red Sox in the first round of the AL playoffs. The Astros defeated the Red Sox three games to one, and advanced to the American League Championship Series against the New York Yankees. The Astros won the ALCS four games to three, and advanced to the World Series to play against the Los Angeles Dodgers. The Astros defeated the Dodgers in the deciding seventh game of the World Series, winning the first championship in franchise history.

The victory was especially meaningful for the Houston area, which was rebuilding after Hurricane Harvey. The city of Houston celebrated the team's accomplishment with a parade on the afternoon of November 3, 2017. Houston police chief Art Acevedo estimated at least 750,000 people attended the parade.

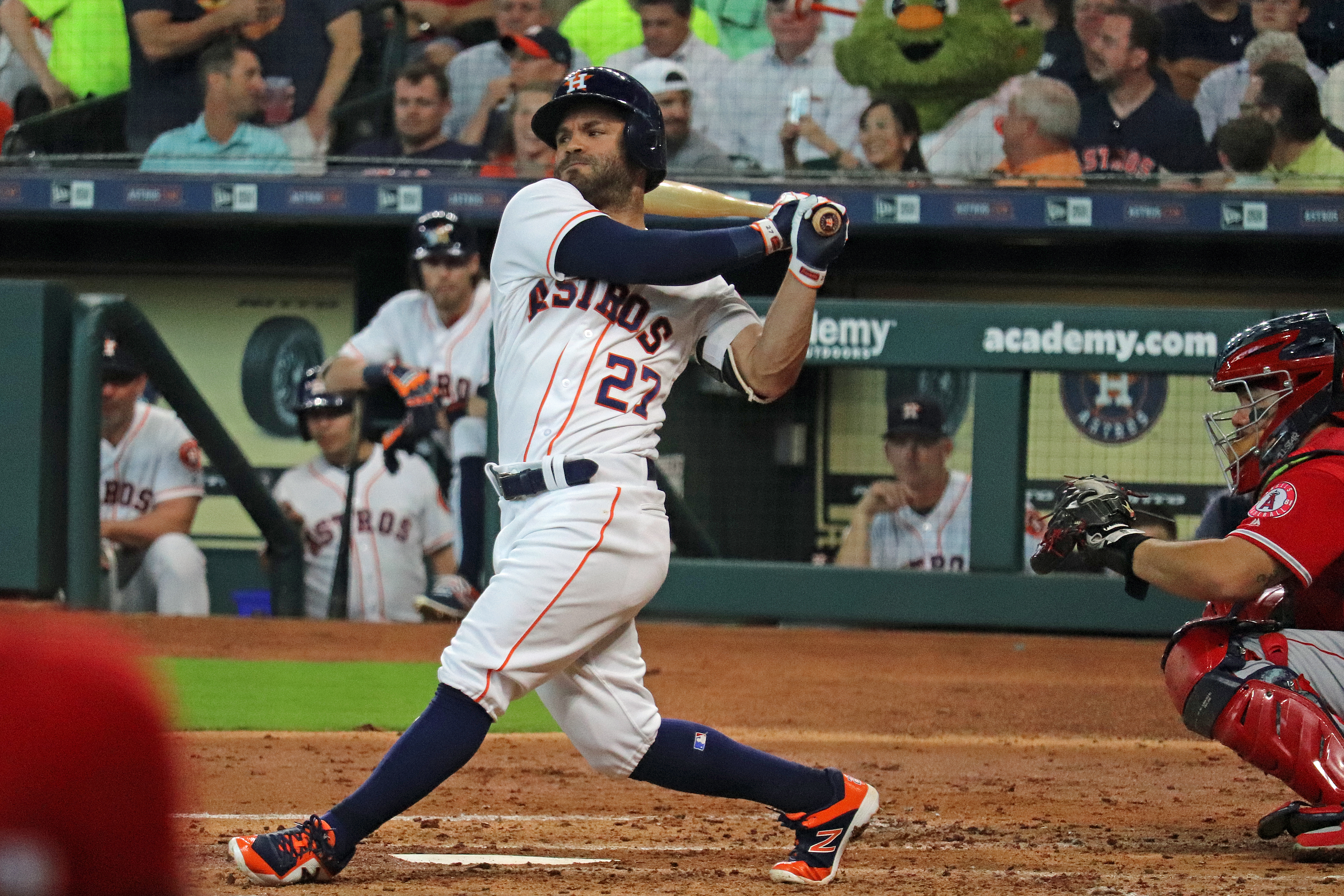
2017 AL MVP - Jose Altuve

On November 16, 2017, Jose Altuve was named the American League Most Valuable Player, capping off a season in which he accumulated 200 hits for the fourth consecutive season, led the majors with a .346 BA, and was the unquestioned clubhouse leader of the World Series champions.

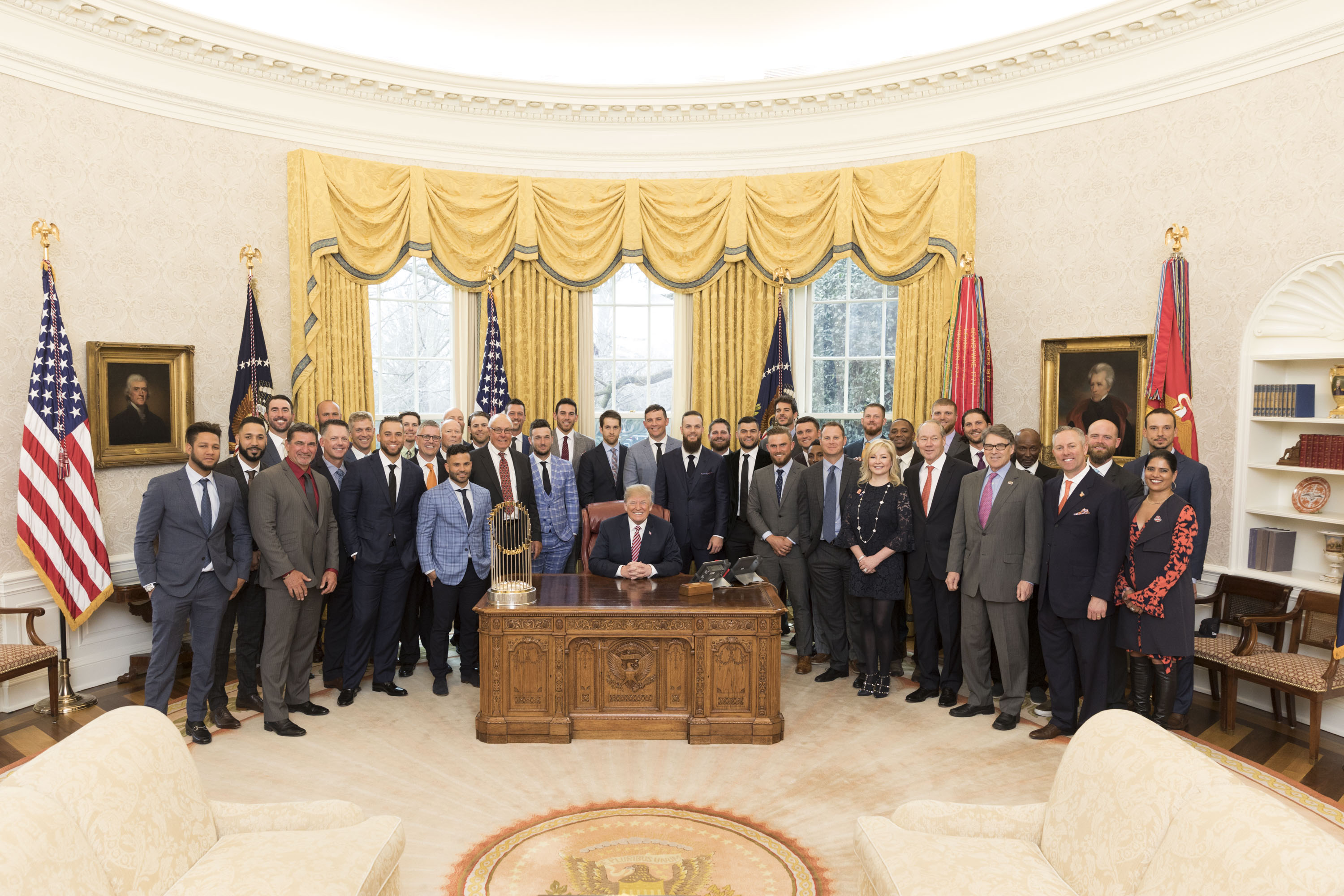
The 2017 team at the White House with President Donald Trump, March 2018

On September 26, 2018, the Astros' second consecutive AL West division championship was clinched with a victory by the Seattle Mariners over the Oakland A's. For the third time in franchise history, and second consecutive season, the team won over 100 games; they finished the regular season 103–59 (a new franchise record) by sweeping a double-header against the Baltimore Orioles on September 29, 2018. The Astros swept the Cleveland Indians in the ALDS to advance to the ALCS to face the league-leading Boston Red Sox (who finished the season 108–54.) After a 7–2 victory in Game 1 of the ALCS, the Astros dropped the next four games, and Boston advanced to the World Series.

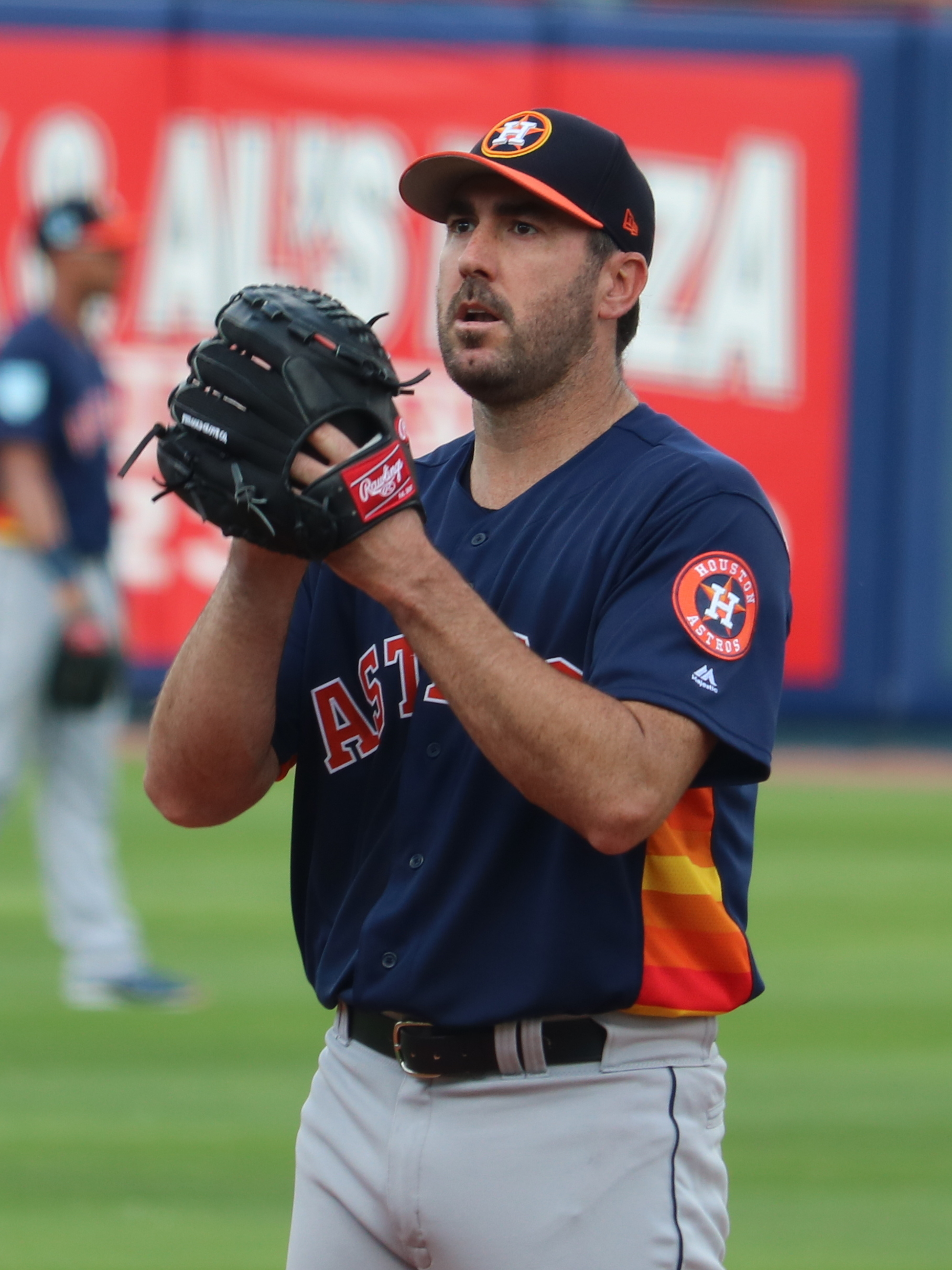
Justin Verlander, 2019 and 2022 AL Cy Young Award winner

In the offseason, the Astros signed veteran outfielder Michael Brantley, and catcher Robinson Chirinos. At the trade deadline on July 31, 2019, Houston acquired another veteran starting pitcher and Cy Young award winner Zack Greinke to bolster the starting rotation. On September 22, the Astros clinched their third consecutive AL West division title. They finished the season with a record of 107–55, the best in franchise history, and the best record in MLB. They became the first team since the 2002–2004 New York Yankees to have 3 consecutive 100-win seasons. They also became the first team in MLB history to have three consecutive 100-loss seasons and three consecutive 100-win seasons in the same decade.

Entering the playoffs as the top-seeded team in both leagues, they defeated the AL Wild Card winner Tampa Bay Rays in five games in the ALDS, advancing to the ALCS for the third year in a row to face the New York Yankees. In Game 6 at Minute Maid Park, Jose Altuve hit a walk-off home run to win the pennant and send the team to its third World Series appearance. However, they lost the 2019 World Series to the Washington Nationals in seven games, taking three games in Washington but losing all four of their games at home.

==== Sign stealing scandal ====
On November 12, 2019, Ken Rosenthal and Evan Drellich wrote an article in The Athletic detailing allegations that the Astros had used cameras to engage in potentially illicit sign stealing against opponents, relying on allegations from former Astros pitcher Mike Fiers as a public source and other allegations from unnamed sources. The Astros were alleged to have used scouts watching catchers' signs in real time behind the dugout at Minute Maid Park to crack the signs and banging a trash can loudly to indicate what kind of pitch was coming. The scandal rippled through the baseball world as videos that appeared to clearly show the scheme were published. Further allegations regarding other means of relaying signs, such as whistling, surfaced in subsequent weeks. MLB and Commissioner Rob Manfred announced a sweeping investigation into the allegations.

On January 13, 2020, MLB announced that its investigation found that the Astros did use cameras and video monitors to steal signs of opposing catchers and signal to hitters throughout the 2017 regular season and postseason, and at least part of the 2018 season. The investigation found no evidence of sign stealing in their pennant-winning 2019 season. The report said that Alex Cora, then the Astros bench coach, Carlos Beltrán, and other unnamed players were involved in developing the scheme. It said Hinch "neither devised the banging scheme nor participated in it," but did not stop it or tell Cora he disapproved of it.

Manfred announced that manager A. J. Hinch and general manager Jeff Luhnow were suspended for one year, the team would be fined $5 million (the maximum allowed under MLB rules), and the team would lose its top two draft picks in both the 2020 and 2021 MLB drafts. About an hour after MLB's announcement, Astros owner Jim Crane announced he had terminated both Hinch and Luhnow, saying he was unaware of the scheme and "extraordinarily troubled and upset", and concluded, "We need to move forward with a clean slate. [We] will not have this happen again on my watch." In a statement, Luhnow denied knowledge of the scheme. Hinch issued a statement saying, "While the evidence consistently showed I didn't endorse or participate in the sign stealing practices, I failed to stop them and I am deeply sorry."

The scandal had repercussions around baseball. Cora was implicated in the report but Manfred withheld a decision on his punishment until the completion of a separate investigation into electronic sign stealing in 2018, when Cora was manager of the Red Sox. However, the report led the Red Sox to dismiss Cora two days after it was published, and the Mets did the same with Beltran, who had been hired as manager shortly before the original story.

=== 2020–present: Second World Series title ===
On January 29, 2020, the Astros announced they hired Dusty Baker as their new manager to replace Hinch. James Click was hired to replace Lunhow as general manager on February 2.

Expectations for a full 2020 season were dashed by the COVID-19 pandemic, which forced Major League Baseball to play a 60-game season that would take place from July to September with no fans in attendance (which was later changed for the NLCS and World Series). The Astros were hampered by injuries to players such as Justin Verlander, Yordan Alvarez, and Roberto Osuna, who each suffered season-ending injuries. As such, the Astros had to rely a plethora of young arms such as Cristian Javier to go alongside veterans in Lance McCullers Jr. and Zack Greinke to accompany an offense that had just one .300 batter in Michael Brantley. The Astros went 29–31, but finished second place in the AL West to qualify for the postseason as part of the decision by MLB to have eight postseason teams in each league for 2020 to accompany a shortened season. The Astros defeated two division champions in the Minnesota Twins and Oakland Athletics to become the first team since the 1998–2001 New York Yankees to advance to the American League Championship Series four times in a row, as well as the first team with a losing regular season record to win a postseason series. In the ALCS, the Astros lost to the Tampa Bay Rays despite forcing a Game 7 after losing the first three games.

The 2021 season was the first to be played with fans in the stands for the regular season since the scandal broke. Rabid opposition for a number of fanbases went hand in hand with the challenge of replacing departed players George Springer and Josh Reddick. By the time of the break for the 2021 MLB All-Star Game, the Astros were 55–36 and contending for a top spot in the postseason, complete with four All-Star selections in Jose Altuve, Carlos Correa, Michael Brantley, and Ryan Pressly. On September 30, the Astros clinched their fourth AL West title in the span of five seasons (which was the first time they had won four division titles in five seasons since the 1998–2001 teams); the six playoff appearances in seven seasons is the best span in franchise history. Yuli Gurriel became the second Astro to win the batting title, doing so at the age of 37 with a batting average of .319. The Astros beat the Chicago White Sox in the American League Division Series to advance to their fifth consecutive ALCS, a feat matched by only two teams in LCS history and the first since the Atlanta Braves of the 1990s (having made all eight contested NLCS from 1991 to 1999). Upon playing together in Game 3 of the 2021 American League Championship Series, Altuve, Correa, Gurriel, and Bregman set a new record for most games played together by four teammates at any position in MLB history, with that game being the 64th between the core four. On October 22, the Astros prevailed 5–0 in Game 6 over the Boston Red Sox to win their third pennant in the last five seasons. They went on to lose the 2021 World Series to the Atlanta Braves in six games.

The 2022 season opened without Carlos Correa at shortstop for the first time since 2016 as he left for the Minnesota Twins in free agency. Rookie shortstop Jeremy Peña made the Opening Day start and manned the position for the entire season. The Astros clinched the division on September 19, their second consecutive division title and their fifth in six seasons. Justin Verlander had a resurgent and historic season, leading the league with a 1.75 ERA en route to his third career Cy Young Award. Upon entering the postseason, the Astros swept the Mariners in three tightly contested ALDS games to advance to their American League record sixth consecutive ALCS. The Astros swept the Yankees to advance to the World Series for the second year in a row and fourth in six seasons. On November 2, 2022, in Game 4 of the 2022 World Series against the Philadelphia Phillies at the Citizens Bank Park, the Astros became the first team to throw a combined no-hitter in postseason history, and the second team to throw a no-hitter in World Series history after Don Larsen's perfect game with the New York Yankees in 1956. The Astros went on to defeat the Phillies in six games, earning their second World Series title. Jeremy Peña won the Series MVP Award; the first rookie position player in MLB history to do so, and the first rookie shortstop in history to hit a home run in the World Series. The Astros became the first team to have a winning percentage of .622 (or better) in a six-season span (2017–2022) with multiple World Series titles since the 1953-1958 New York Yankees, and they became the sixth team since 1960 to win the World Series after losing it the previous year.

During the 2022-23 offseason, Baker's contract was renewed for another year, while Click parted ways with the team after contract negotiations broke down. In February 2023, Dana Brown was hired as the new general manager for the Astros.

The 2023 season began inauspiciously: the Astros lost their first Opening Day game since 2012, 3–2, to the Chicago White Sox. This snapped a streak of 10 straight wins on Opening Day for the club, a modern record. It was also the first season since 2017 not to feature Yuli Gurriel at first base, who signed a minor league contract with the Miami Marlins, and was replaced by José Abreu, whom the Astros had signed to a 3-year contract during the offseason. Entering the All-Star break, the Astros had a 50–41 record while sending Yordan Álvarez, Kyle Tucker, and Framber Valdez to the Midsummer Classic. The American League, managed by Dusty Baker, lost for the first time since 2012. After losing him to free agency in the offseason, the Astros reacquired Justin Verlander from the Mets at the trade deadline to bolster their rotation. After playing well in July and August, the Astros slumped in September, battling with the Mariners and the Rangers for the division all the way until the final game of the season. The Astros and Rangers finished tied at 90–72; however, the Astros won the division by virtue of their 9–4 season record against Texas. The Astros beat the Minnesota Twins in the ALDS to advance to their American League record seventh consecutive ALCS. Ultimately, the Astros fell in seven games to the Rangers, a series in which the away team won every game, reminiscent of the Astros defeat in the 2019 World Series.

On October 25, 2023, Baker announced his retirement. On November 13, 2023, Joe Espada was named the 25th manager in Astros history.

The Astros began the 2024 season in dreadful fashion by losing on Opening Day to the New York Yankees 5–4. They would be swept in four games on Opening Weekend. They would earn their first win on April 1 when Ronel Blanco threw the first no-hitter of the 2024 season against the Toronto Blue Jays as the Astros defeated Toronto 10–0. Blanco, making just his eighth career start after making the roster just a few days before, struck out seven and walked two to complete the seventeenth no-hitter in franchise history and the fourth at Minute Maid Park. First-year manager Joe Espada also made history that night, becoming the first manager in MLB history to earn their first managerial win via a no-hitter. Jenny Cavnar and Julia Morales became the first two women to do the play-by-play on television for the same Major League Baseball game on May 13, 2024, against the Oakland Athletics. After hitting a low of 12-24 on May 8th, the Astros climbed back to .500 by the end of June after a 30-17 stretch. The Astros sent Jose Altuve, Yordan Alvarez, and Kyle Tucker to the All-Star Game with both Altuve and Alvarez named as starters. Yusei Kikuchi became the first Japanese-born player to pitch for the Astros after being acquired at the trade deadline. The Astros went on to win his nine first starts, a franchise record and the longest streak in the majors since John Burkett with the 2002 Boston Red Sox. The Astros became the second expansion team to reach 5,000 wins, defeating the Angels, who reached the mark earlier in the season, on September 14th. Ten days later, the Astros clinched the AL West division title for the fourth straight year with a 4–3 victory over the Mariners, becoming the first team to win that division four seasons in a row since the Oakland Athletics won the division title from 1971 to 1975. It was their seventh division title in eight years. The Astros won the 2024 division title despite beginning the season 7–19, at one point trailing the Mariners by 10 games in the AL West, becoming the first team in the expansion era to begin the season with that record and still make the playoffs. The Astros faced off against former manager A.J. Hinch and the Detroit Tigers in the American League Wild Card Series, losing consecutive games at home, including their seventh straight playoff home loss, to miss the ALCS for the first time since 2016 and end their American League record at seven consecutive appearances.

== Uniforms ==
=== 1962–1964: The Colt .45's ===
Houston's MLB franchise debuted as the Colt .45s in 1962, and the original home uniforms featured a navy pistol with orange smoke coming out of the barrel to form the "C" in "Colts". The road uniforms featured the city name written in navy block letters with orange trim, and the flag of Texas patch was placed on the left sleeve. Caps were all-navy featuring ".45s" in orange letters in front.

=== 1965–1974: Shooting stars ===
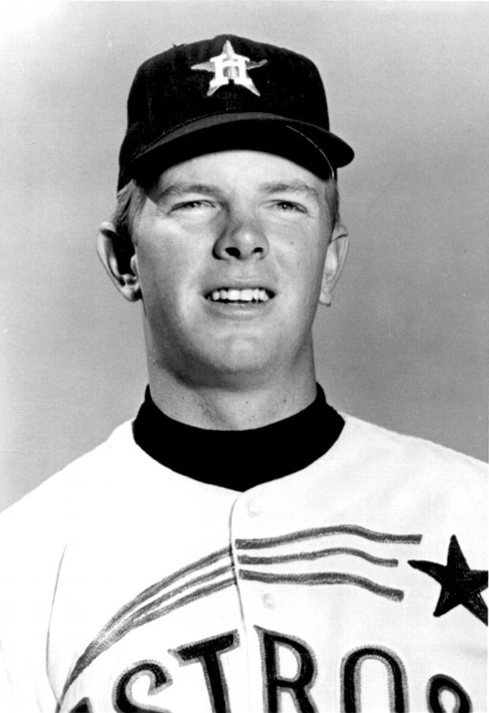
Photocard of Larry Dierker wearing the "shooting star" uniform from 1966

Renamed the Astros and moving to the Astrodome in 1965, they took to the field in home uniforms featuring the "shooting star" design. The uniforms initially featured "Astros" in navy with orange trim, and the cap now sported an orange star with "H" in block serif letters. The road uniforms remained the same save for the Astros logo replacing the Texas flag (the same logo was also applied on the home uniforms).

In 1971 the Astros made some changes to their uniform: they kept the same style they had in previous seasons, but inverted the colors. What was navy was now orange and what was orange was now a lighter shade of blue. The players' last names were added to the back of the jerseys. In 1972, the uniform fabric was also changed to what was at the time revolutionizing the industry – polyester. Belts were replaced by elastic waistbands, and jerseys zipped up instead of having buttons. The uniforms became popular with fans, but would last only until 1975, when the Astros would shock baseball and the fashion world.

=== 1975–1986: Tequila sunrise/Orange rainbows ===
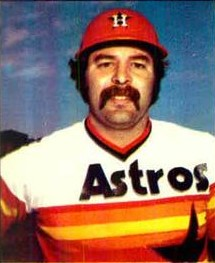
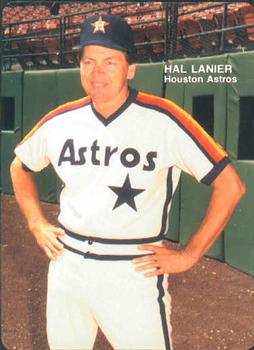
Joe Ferguson (left) wearing the original "rainbow" uniform. Hal Lanier (right) wearing the "rainbow shoulders" uniform.

The 1975 season saw the introduction of the Astros' new uniforms. Many teams were going away from the traditional uniform and the Astros were no exception. From the chest down, the uniform was a solid block of yellow, orange, and red stripes. There was also a large dark blue star over the midsection. The same multi-colored stripes ran down the pant legs. Players' numbers not only appeared on the back of the jersey, but also on the pant leg. The bright stripes were meant to appear as a fiery trail like a rocket sweeping across the heavens. The uniforms were panned by critics, but the public liked them and versions started appearing at the high school and little league level. The uniform was so different from what other teams wore that the Astros wore it both at home and on the road until 1980, though it underwent a few minor modifications with the navy star and number style.

=== 1980–1993: Rainbow shoulders ===
Also in 1980, the Astros debuted a cleaner uniform, relegating the rainbows to the sleeves. The design was initially worn on the road (with the original rainbow uniform relegated to home games), but in 1982 the rainbow shoulder look began appearing on select home games as well. In addition, the navy cap returned with this uniform and the orange cap was eventually retired in 1983. By 1987, this uniform became the Astros' primary look, retiring the original rainbow uniforms. When it first unveiled, the rainbow-shoulder uniform was light grey, but by 1982, the fabric was changed to cream. A white version was added for home games that same year. Before the 1989 season, the pullover design was retired and buttons and belts returned to this uniform. From 1982 to 1993, the Astros did not have a grey uniform, and generally wore the white at home and cream on the road.

=== 1994–1999: Midnight blue and gold ===
Coinciding with the change in ownership, the team switched uniforms and team colors after the 1993 season to go for a new, more serious image. The team's trademark rainbow uniforms were retired, and the team's colors changed to midnight blue and metallic gold. The "Astros" font on the team logo was changed to a more aggressive one, and the team's traditional star logo was changed to a stylized, "flying" star with an open left end.

Both the home and road uniforms featured a star substituting for the penultimate letter "O" in both "Astros" (home) and "Houston" (road); the road uniform was later tweaked in 1997 with the star now affixed next to the word "Houston". The letters were written in a more futuristic manner. The Astros also wore midnight blue alternates with "Astros" in white with gold trim, changed in 1997 to only feature the flying star logo. The midnight blue cap featured the flying star logo. It also marked the first time since 1982 that the Astros wore grey uniforms on the road.

=== 2000–2012: Railroad design ===
Moving to Minute Maid Park (originally Enron Field) in 2000, the Astros took to the field wearing vintage-inspired uniforms. For the first time, navy was not part of the team's palette, and the Astros uniforms featured brick red, sand and black colors. The colors were inspired by the location of their new ballpark which formerly housed a railroad depot.

Primary home uniforms featured black pinstripes with "Astros" in black script letters and numbers in red. The road uniforms sported "Houston" in red script letters and black numbers. Alternate white uniforms without pinstripes featured all letters in brick red with sand trim, initially with the brick red star logo on the left chest before switching to the "Astros" wordmark by 2002. The Astros also wore black alternate home and road uniforms, with "Houston" (road) and "Astros" (home) emblazoned in front, but switched to brick red alternates by 2002. The letters on both uniforms are in sand with brick red trim. Black caps with the updated star in red became the primary cap while a red cap with the sand star was used as an alternate.

Astros' "railroad" uniforms

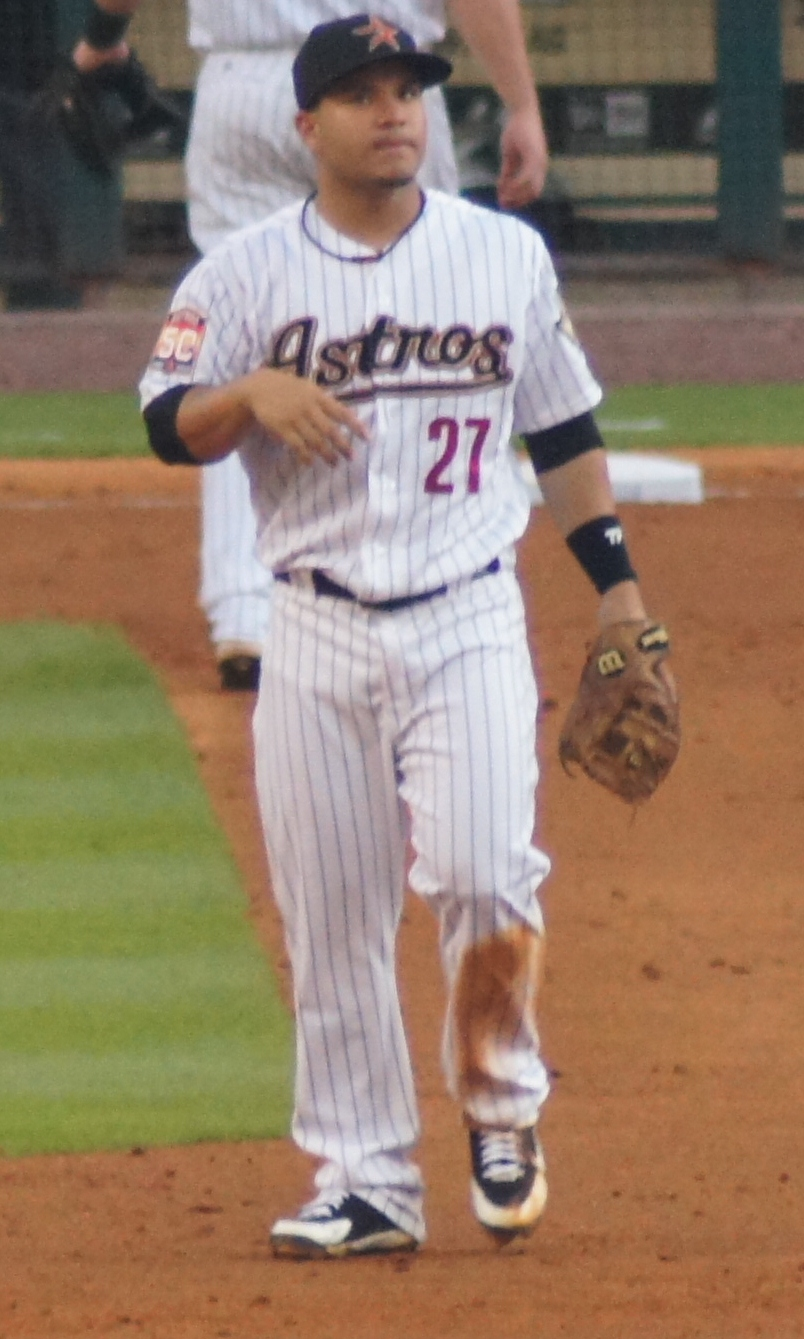
Jose Altuve in the primary home pinstriped uniform with black cap.

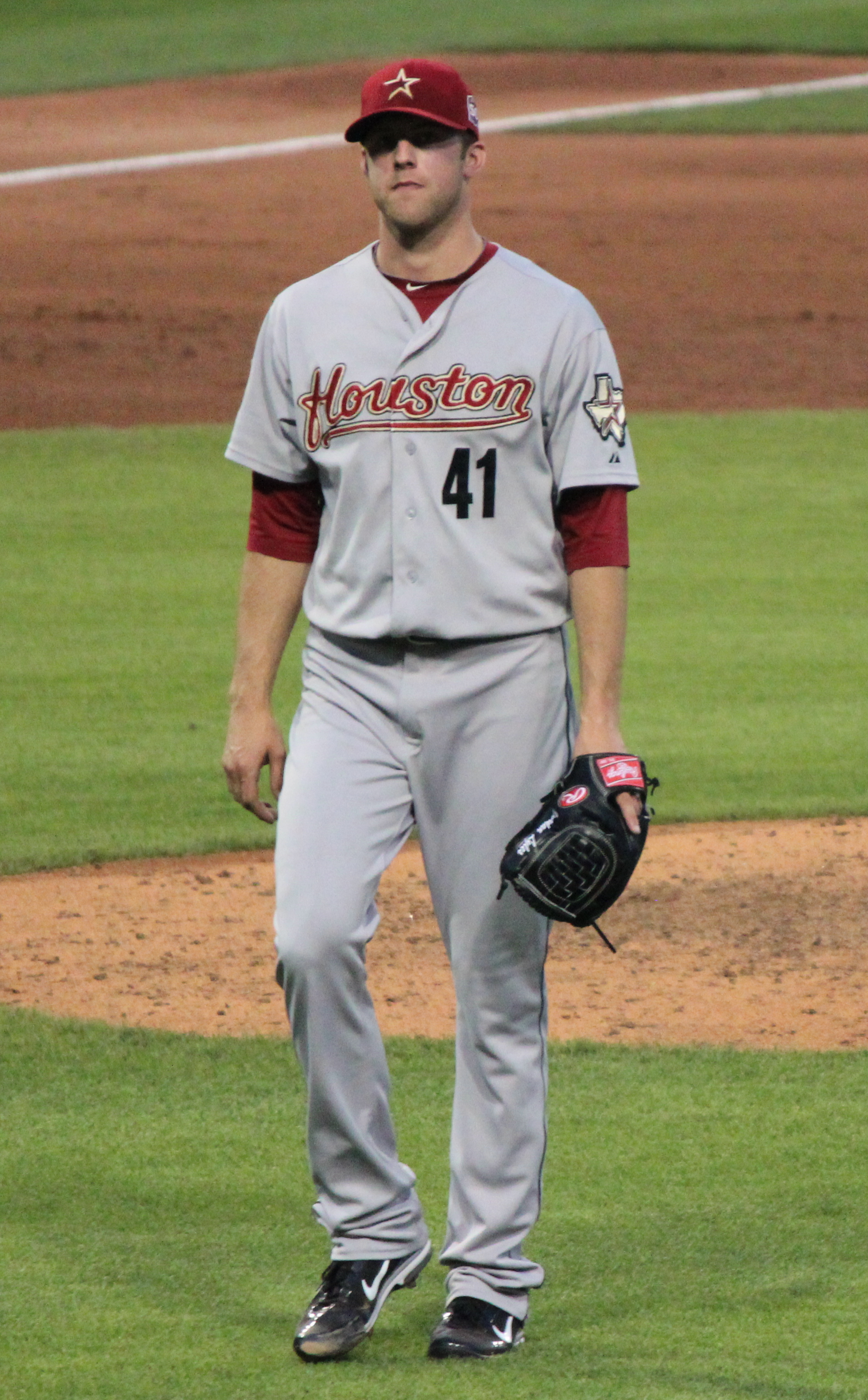
Jordan Lyles in the road uniform with brick red cap.

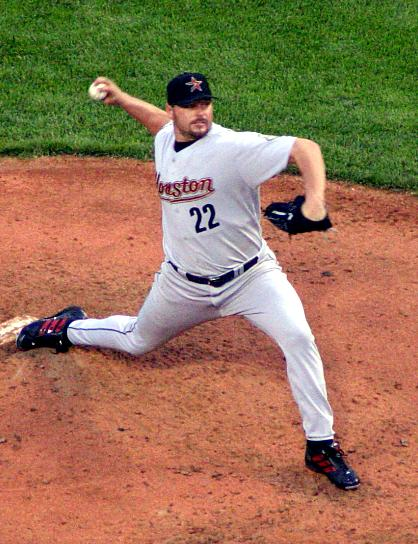
Roger Clemens in the road uniform with black cap.

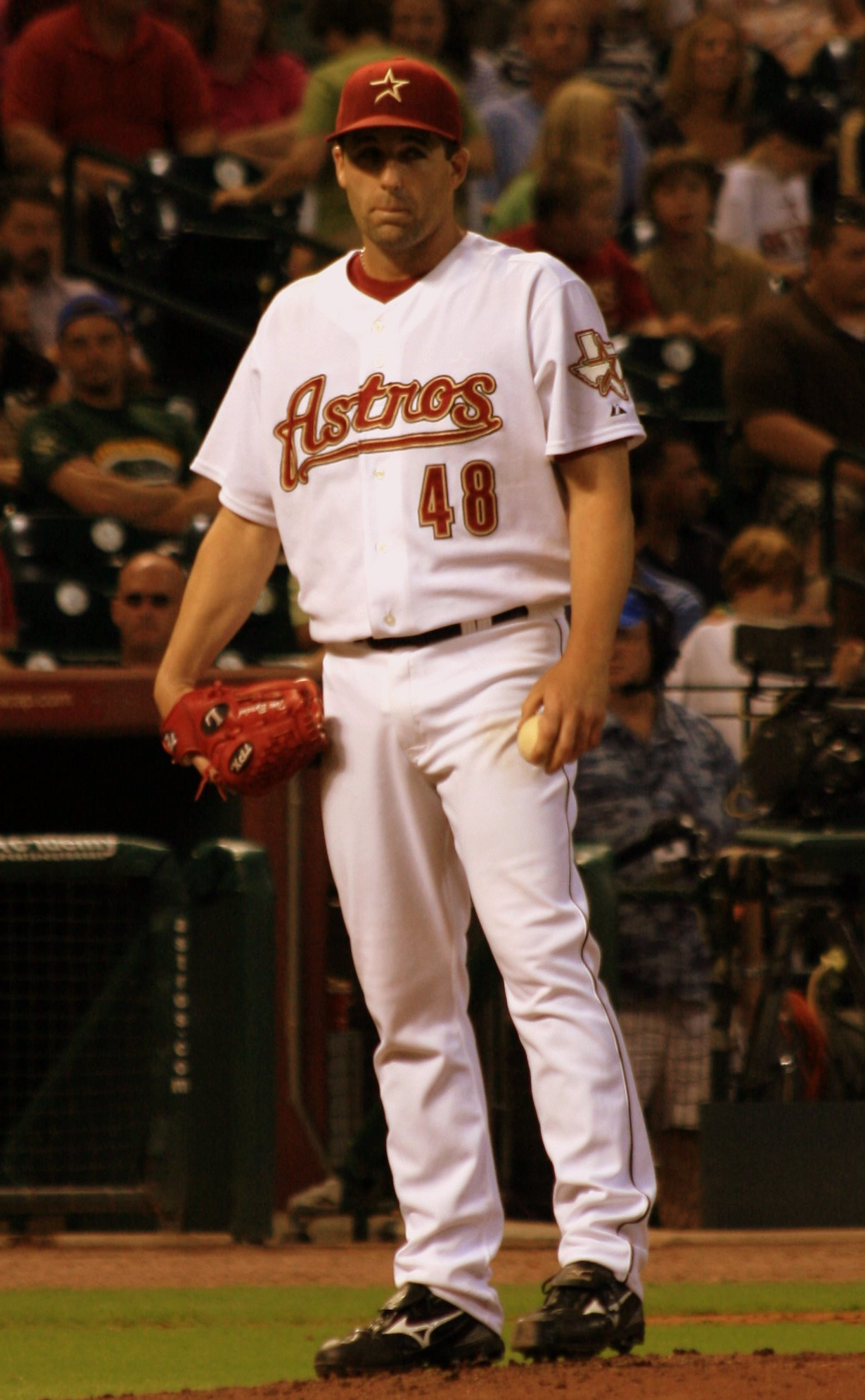
Tim Byrdak in the alternate white uniform with brick red cap.

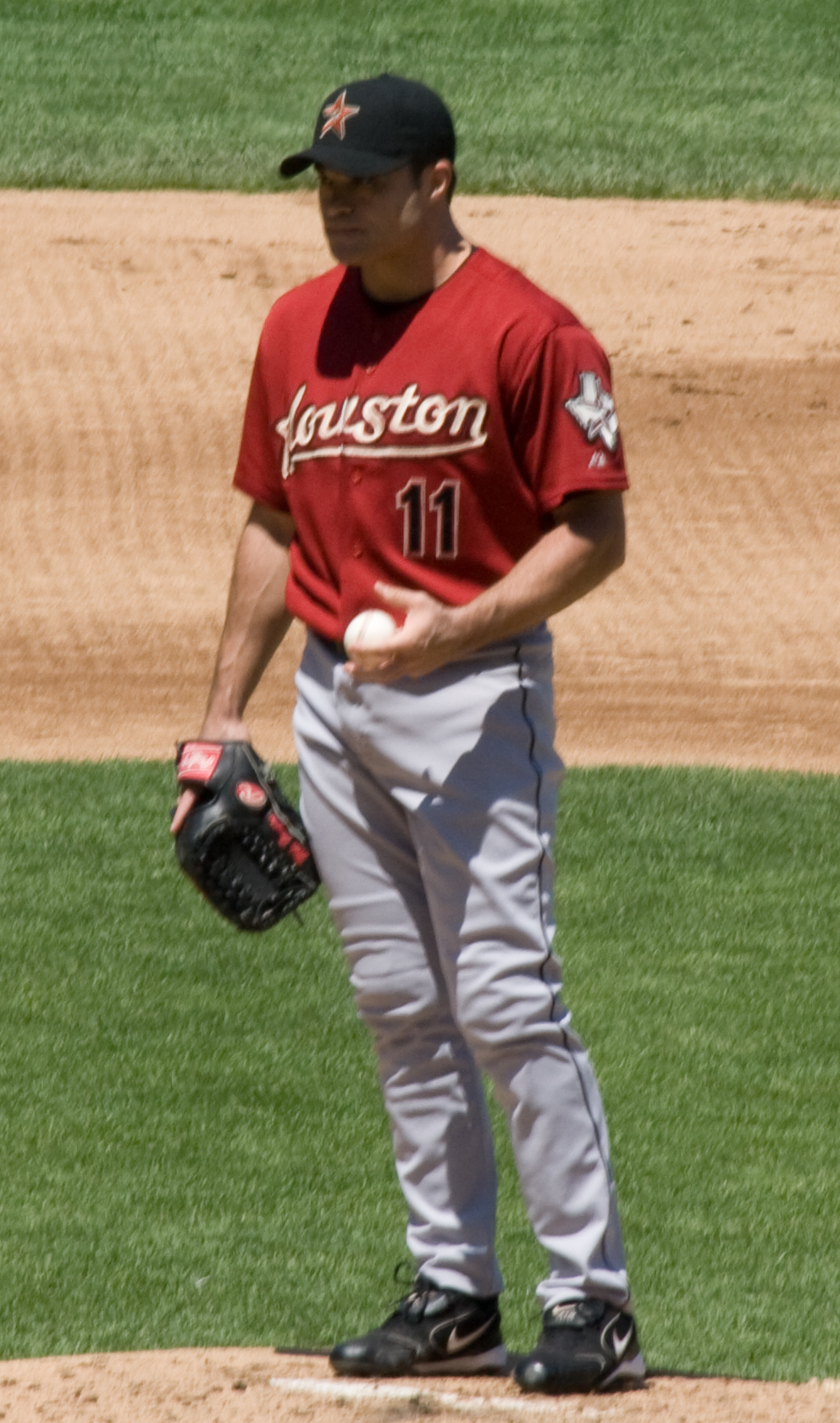
Mike Hampton in the alternate brick red road uniform with black cap.

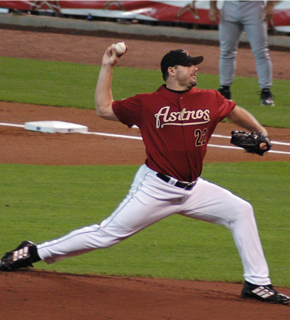
Roger Clemens in the alternate brick red home uniform with black cap.

=== 2013–present: Return to navy and orange ===
In 2013, the Astros returned to the navy and orange look of previous eras. Both uniforms featured the city name (road) and team name (home) in block navy letters with orange trim, along with numbers on the left chest. Piping was also added in front. The orange alternate contained the team name and numbers in navy with white trim. The Astros also wore navy uniforms with the orange rainbow stripes along the side; the front originally featured the "H" star before replacing it with "Astros" in orange in 2016. Navy caps with the "H" and orange star returned as the team's primary cap, while a navy cap with orange brim was used in some games. Until 2015, the Astros also wore all-orange caps with the home uniforms, and from 2016 to 2018, the navy alternates were paired occasionally with an orange cap with navy brim. While the navy alternates are usually worn on Sunday home games, in recent years, it became the preferred uniform during Framber Valdez's starts regardless of it being a home or road game.

In 2022, the Astros were one of seven teams to add Nike's "City Connect" uniforms. The predominantly navy uniform, including its letterforms, incorporated the "Space City" wordmark in homage to NASA's "worm" logo. The uniform also added various elements from the "Tequila sunrise" uniforms of the 1970s, including numerals on the right leg and red/orange/yellow gradients on the piping and socks. The left sleeve patch has the modified Texas flag recolored to the Astros' navy and orange motif, with the "H-star" logo replacing the white star. All-navy caps feature the modified "H-star" logo incorporating a planet in orbit. This uniform was usually worn on Monday home games. On September 22, 2024, the Astros announced that they were wearing the "Space City" uniforms for the final time.

In 2025, the team introduced their second "City Connect" uniform. The jersey features the team nickname "STROS" in blue lettering with an orange star logo, trim carrying over from their City Connect 1.0 with their "tequila sunrise" pattern and a lunar pattern pinstriping on the pants paying tribute to the history of the moon landing. They also debuted a new hat logo which is a futuristic design of their traditional star logo in the form of the Astros "A". The sleeve features a mission patch inspired from the long-time union station logo. The belt loop has "HTX" stitched along the beltline to pay tribute to Houston, Texas. The afterburner socks feature a mixture of orange and yellow in the design of a fire which symbolize the afterburners on a Rocketship.

Current Astros uniforms

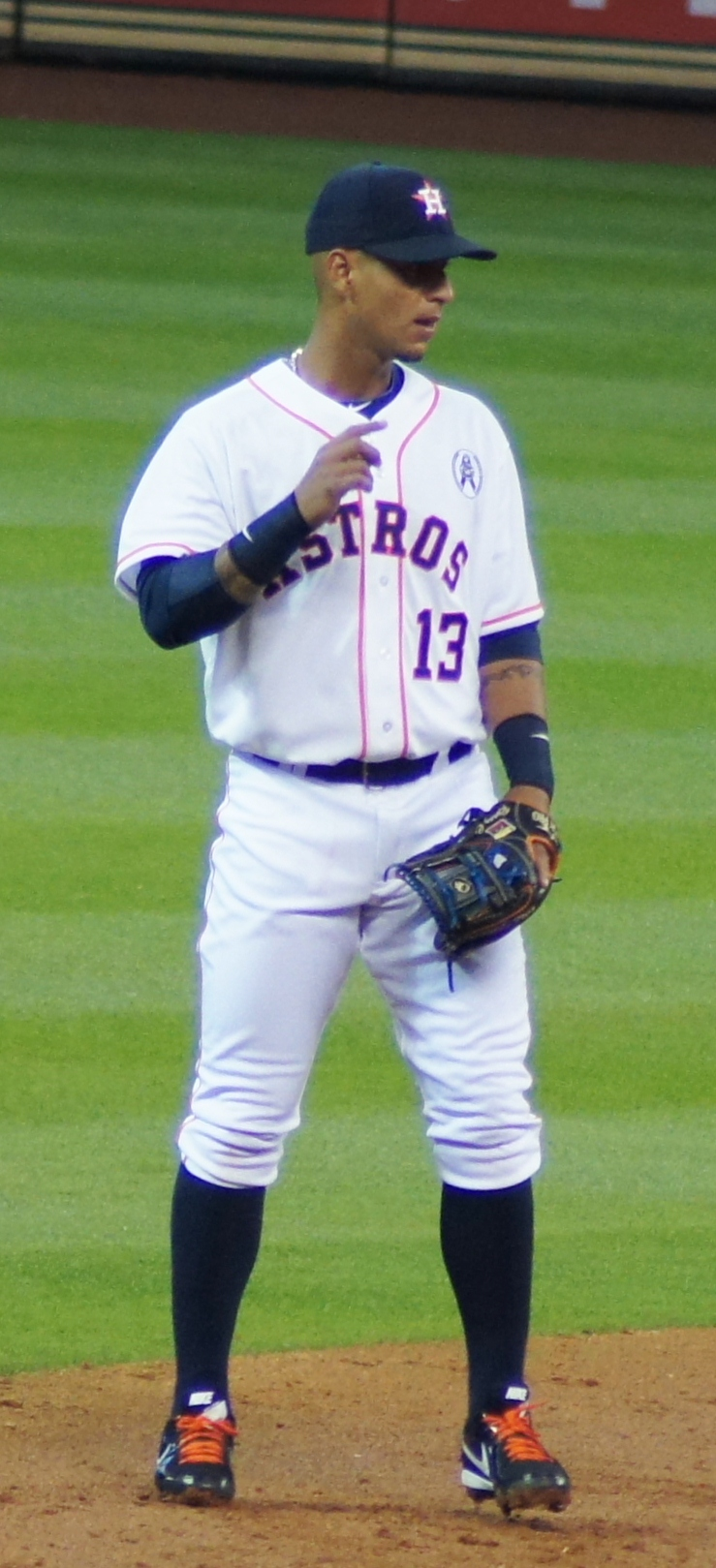
Ronny Cedeño in the home uniform with navy accessories.

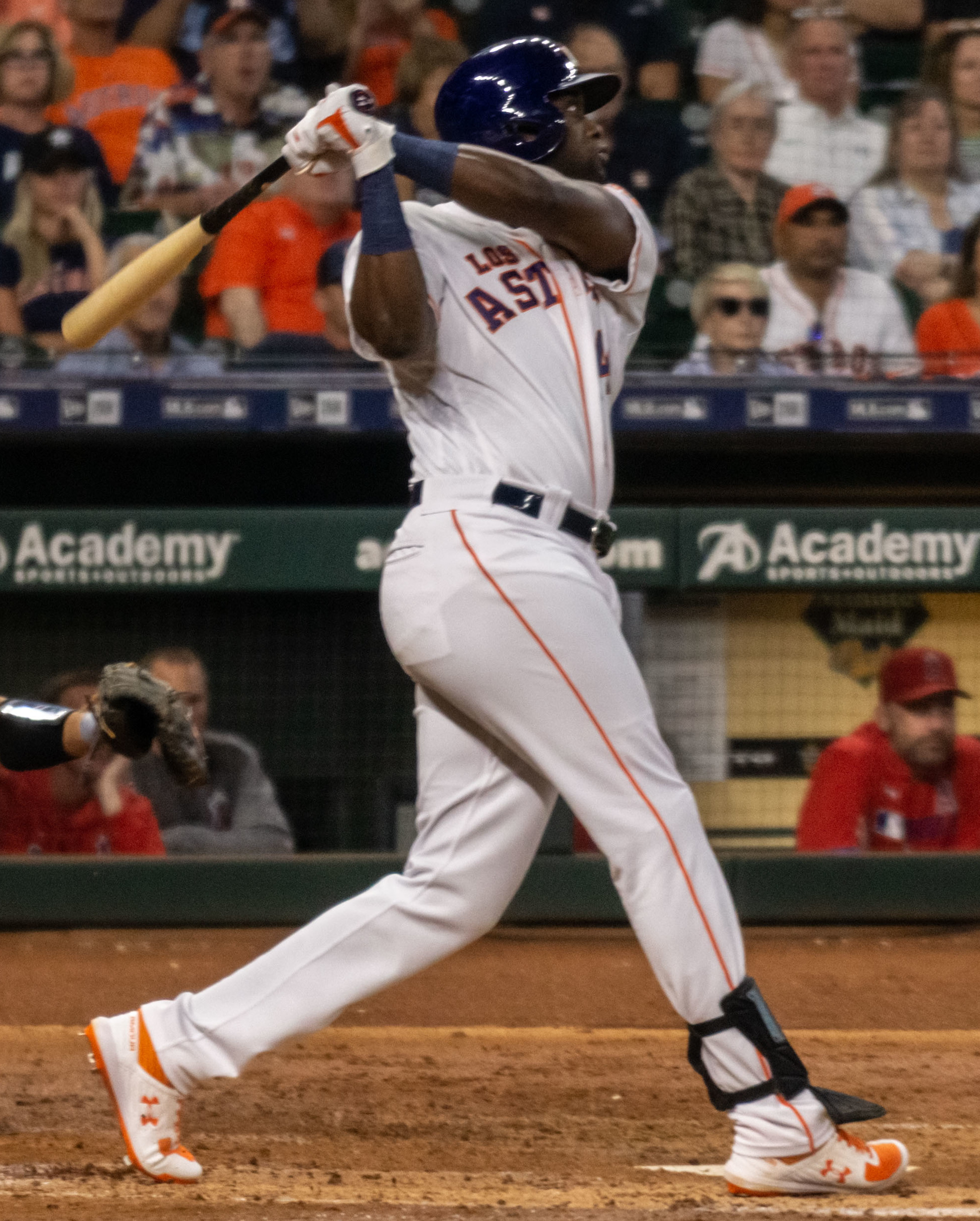
Yordan Alvarez in the home "Los Astros" uniform with navy accessories.

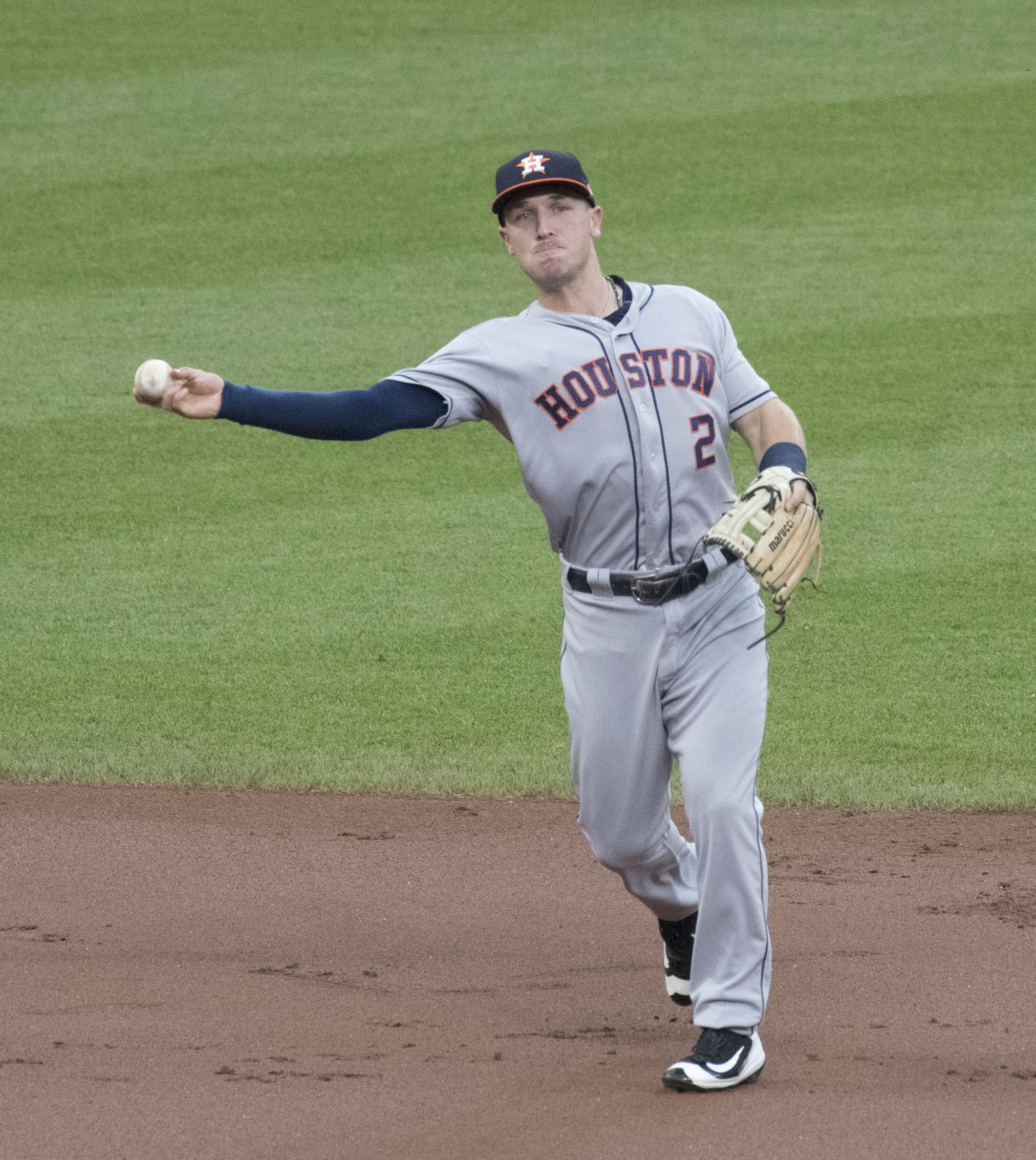
Alex Bregman in the road uniform with alternate navy cap and orange bill (still used occasionally).

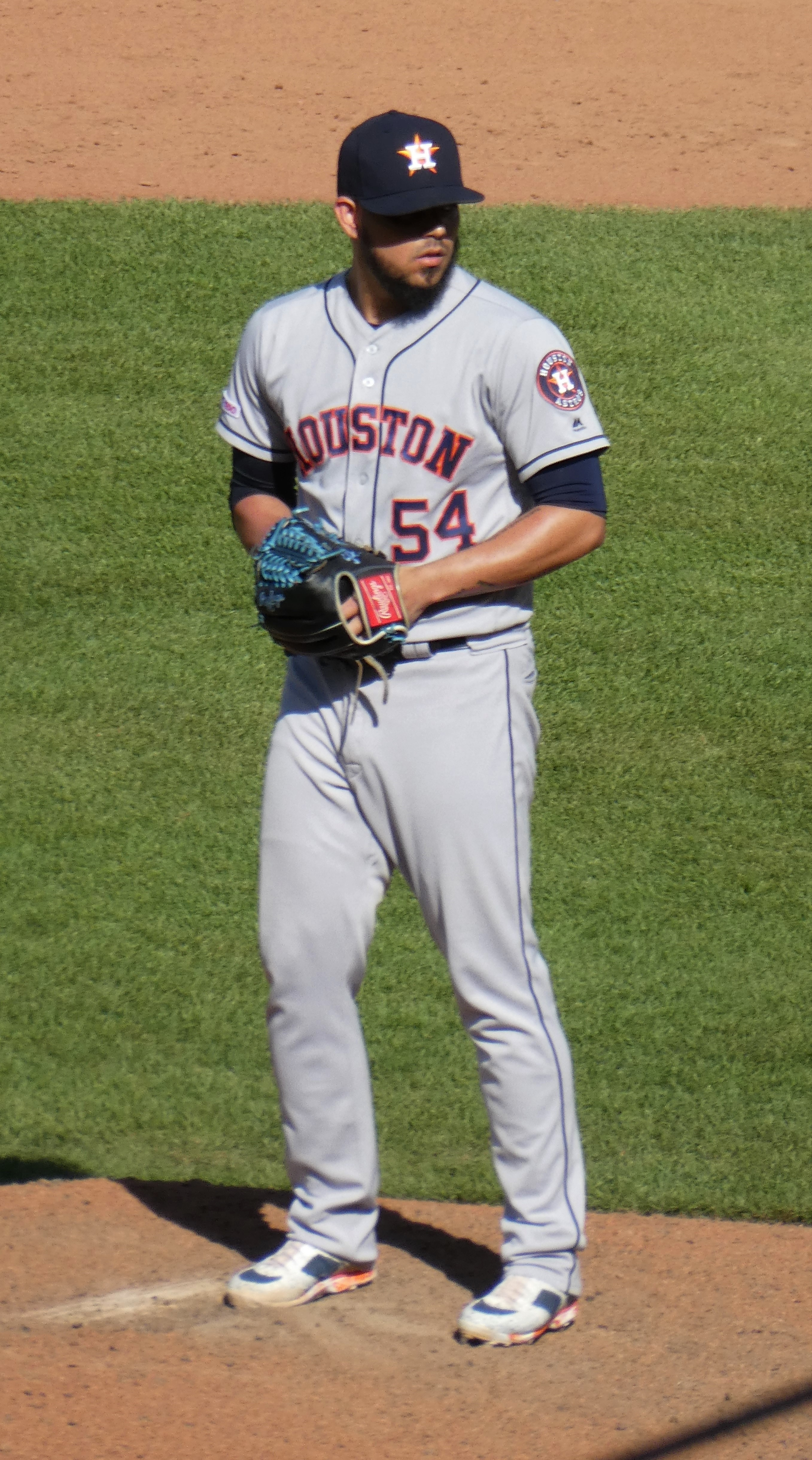
Roberto Osuna in the road uniform with primary navy cap.

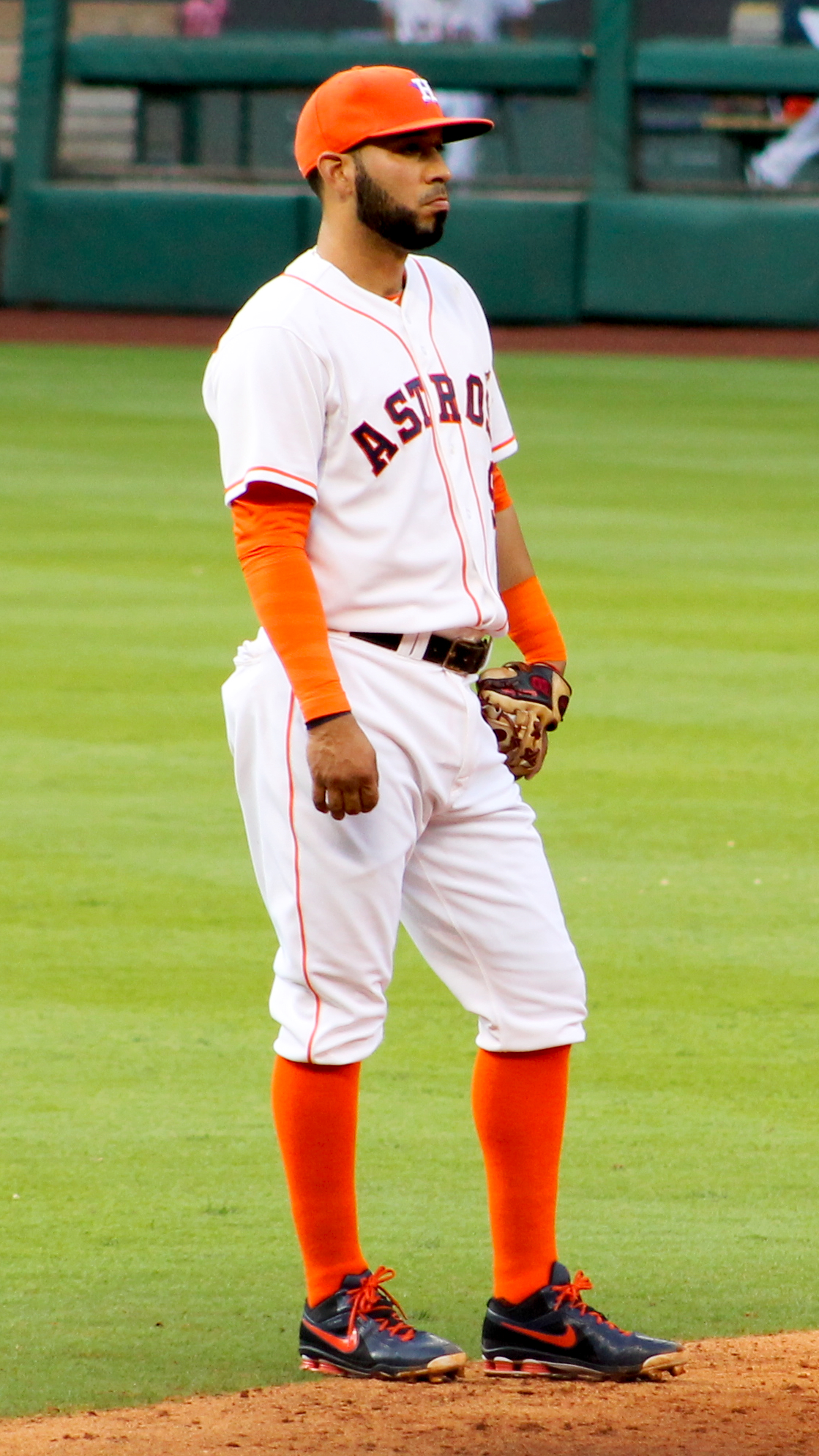
Marwin González in the home uniform with orange accessories (no longer used).

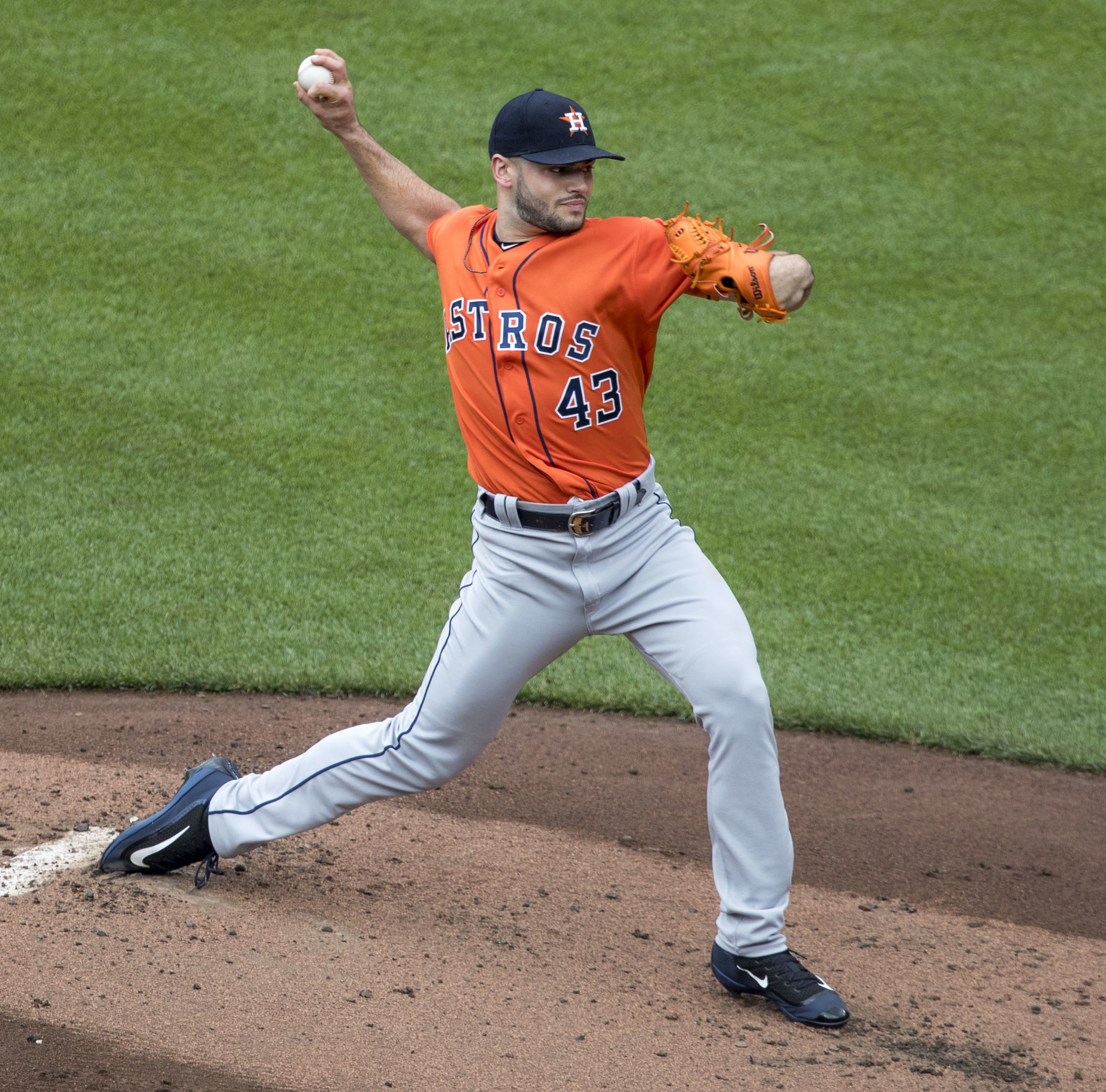
Lance McCullers Jr. in the alternate orange uniform with road pants.

== Achievements ==
=== Franchise record ===
As of the completion of the 2023 season

Team name	Games	Wins	Losses	Ties	W-L%
Colt .45s (1962–1964)	486	196	288	2	.405
NL Astros (1965–2012)	7,652	3,803	3846	3	.497
NL total (1962–2012)	8,138	3,999	4,134	5	.492
AL Astros (2013–present)	1,680	922	758	–	.549
All-time regular season	9,818	4,921	4,892	5	.501
All-time postseason	159	83	76	–	.522

=== Awards ===
Darryl Kile Award

Two awards are presented each year, one to a Houston Astro and one to a St. Louis Cardinal, each of whom exemplifies Kile's virtues of being "a good teammate, a great friend, a fine father and a humble man." The winner is selected by each local chapter of the Baseball Writers' Association of America.

=== Team captains ===
- 23 Enos Cabell, 3B/1B, 1984–1985

=== Retired numbers ===
Jeff
Bagwell
1B
Coach
Retired August 26, 2007
Craig
Biggio
C, 2B

Retired August 17, 2008
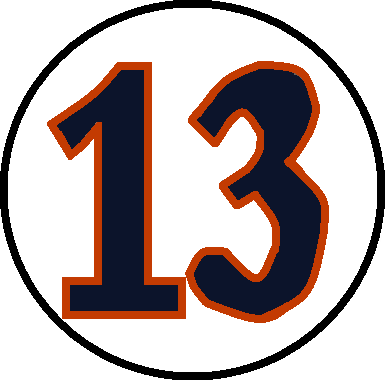
Billy
Wagner
P
Retired August 16, 2025
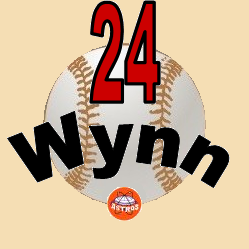
Jimmy
Wynn
OF

Retired June 25, 2005
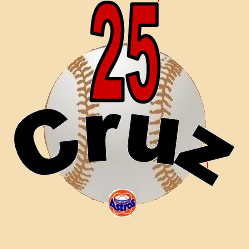
José
Cruz
OF
Coach
Retired October 3, 1992
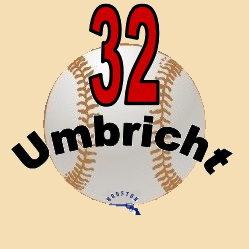
Jim
Umbricht
P

Retired April 12, 1965
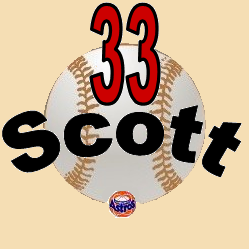
Mike
Scott
P

Retired October 3, 1992
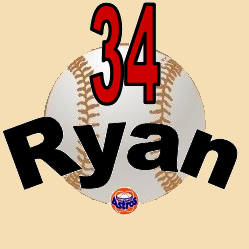
Nolan
Ryan
P

Retired September 29, 1996
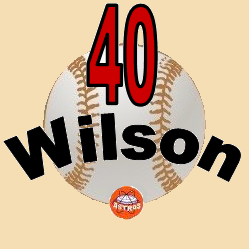
Don
Wilson
P

Retired April 13, 1975
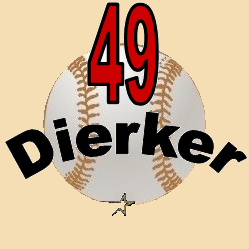
Larry
Dierker
P
Manager
Retired May 19, 2002
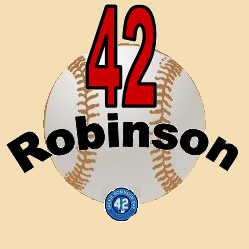
Jackie
Robinson
All MLB

Honored April 15, 1997

While not officially retired, the Astros have not reissued number 57 since 2002, when former Astros pitcher Darryl Kile died as an active player with the St. Louis Cardinals. A "DK" marker is currently present in the wall of left-center field at Daikan Park. The number 42 is retired by Major League Baseball in honor of Jackie Robinson.

== Hall of Fame ==
=== Baseball Hall of Fame members ===
Houston Astros Hall of Famers
Affiliation according to the National Baseball Hall of Fame and Museum
Houston Colt .45s

Nellie Fox

Houston Astros

**Jeff Bagwell** *
Carlos Beltrán

**Craig Biggio** *
Leo Durocher
Randy Johnson

Jeff Kent
Eddie Mathews
Joe Morgan

Robin Roberts
Iván Rodríguez
Nolan Ryan

Don Sutton
**Billy Wagner** *

- Players and managers listed in **bold** are depicted on their Hall of Fame plaques wearing a Colt .45s or Astros cap insignia.
- * Houston Astros listed as primary team according to the Hall of Fame

=== Ford C. Frick Award recipients ===
Houston Astros Ford C. Frick Award recipients
Affiliation according to the National Baseball Hall of Fame and Museum

**Gene Elston**

Milo Hamilton

Al Helfer

Harry Kalas

- **Names in bold** received the award based primarily on their work as broadcasters for the Colt .45s or Astros.

=== Astros Hall of Fame ===
On January 26, 2019, the team announced plans for a team Hall of Fame along with an inaugural class of inductees (including all retired numbers and members of the 2012 Walk of Fame), complete with an orange jacket and renderings for each of the inductees. The Astros Hall of Fame (with sponsorship by Houston Methodist) is currently located in the former Home Run Alley area of the ballpark under the new name of Hall of Fame Alley, beginning in March that revealed a series of plaques on Hall of Fame weekend on August 2 and induction the next day. A display was installed in the Union Station lobby on January 31 that included the jerseys and hats of the first class of inductees. The 2020 season belayed induction of the second group of Hall of Fame members until August 7 of the 2021 season. While there was no class of 2021, the committee dedicated to electing a broad representation of Astros did elect a class of 2022 for August of the impending season, selecting Terry Puhl and Tal Smith as the next inductees into the Astros Hall.

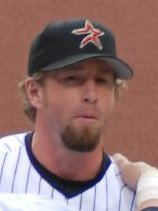
Jeff Bagwell (1991–2005), Hall of Famer

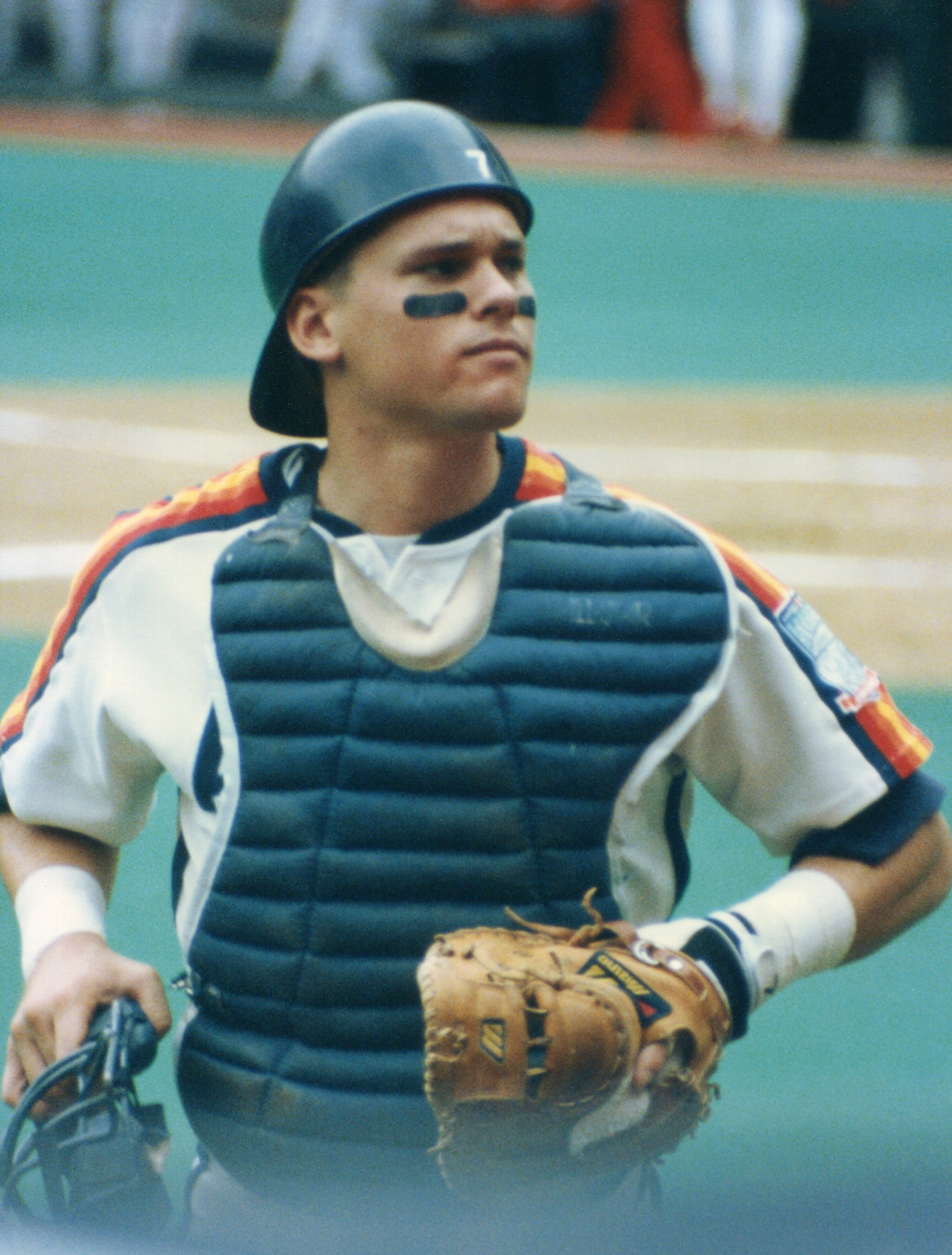
Craig Biggio (1988–2007), Hall of Famer

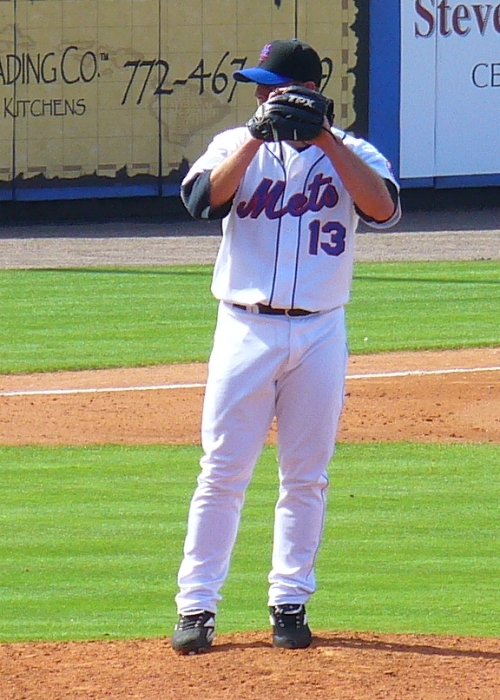
Billy Wagner (1995–2003), Hall of Famer

Key
**Bold**	Member of the Baseball Hall of Fame
†	Member of the Baseball Hall of Fame as an Astro
**Bold**	Recipient of the Hall of Fame's Ford C. Frick Award

**Houston Astros Hall of Fame**
Year	No.	Player	Position	Tenure
2019	14	Bob Aspromonte	3B	1962–1968
2019	5	**Jeff Bagwell**^{†}	1B	1991–2005
2019	4, 7	**Craig Biggio**^{†}	2B / C / OF	1988–2007
2019	25	José Cruz	OF	1975–1987
2019	49	Larry Dierker	P Broadcaster; Manager	1964–1976; 1979–1996; 1997–2001
2019	—	**Gene Elston**	Broadcaster	1962–1986
2019	—	**Milo Hamilton**	Broadcaster	1985–2012
2019	12, 35, 18, 8	**Joe Morgan**	2B	1963–1971, 1980
2019	36	Joe Niekro	P	1975–1985
2019	38, 37	Shane Reynolds	P	1992–2002
2019	50	J.R. Richard	P	1971–1980
2019	34	**Nolan Ryan**	P	1980–1988
2019	33	Mike Scott	P	1983–1991
2019	45, 32	Jim Umbricht	P	1962–1963
2019	23, 40	Don Wilson	P	1966–1974
2019	18, 24	Jimmy Wynn	OF	1963–1973
2020	22, 17	Lance Berkman	OF/1B	1999–2010
2020	28	César Cedeño	CF	1970–1981
2020	—	Roy Hofheinz	Owner	1960–1975
2020	44	Roy Oswalt	P	2001–2010
2020	13	**Billy Wagner**^{†}	P	1995–2003
2020	38, 11, 26, 27	Bob Watson	1B/LF; GM	1966–1979; 1993–1995
2022	21	Terry Puhl	OF	1977–1990
2022	—	Tal Smith	Executive	1960–1973; 1975–1980; 1994–2011
2023	—	Bill Brown	Broadcaster	1987–2016
2023	19	Bill Doran	2B	1982–1990
2024	—	René Cárdenas	Broadcaster	1961–1975; 2007
2024	11	Ken Caminiti	3B	1987–1994; 1999–2000
2026	3	Phil Garner	3B; Manager	1981–1987; 2004–2007
2026	14	Alan Ashby	C Broadcaster	1979–1989; 1998–2006, 2013–2016

=== Texas Sports Hall of Fame ===
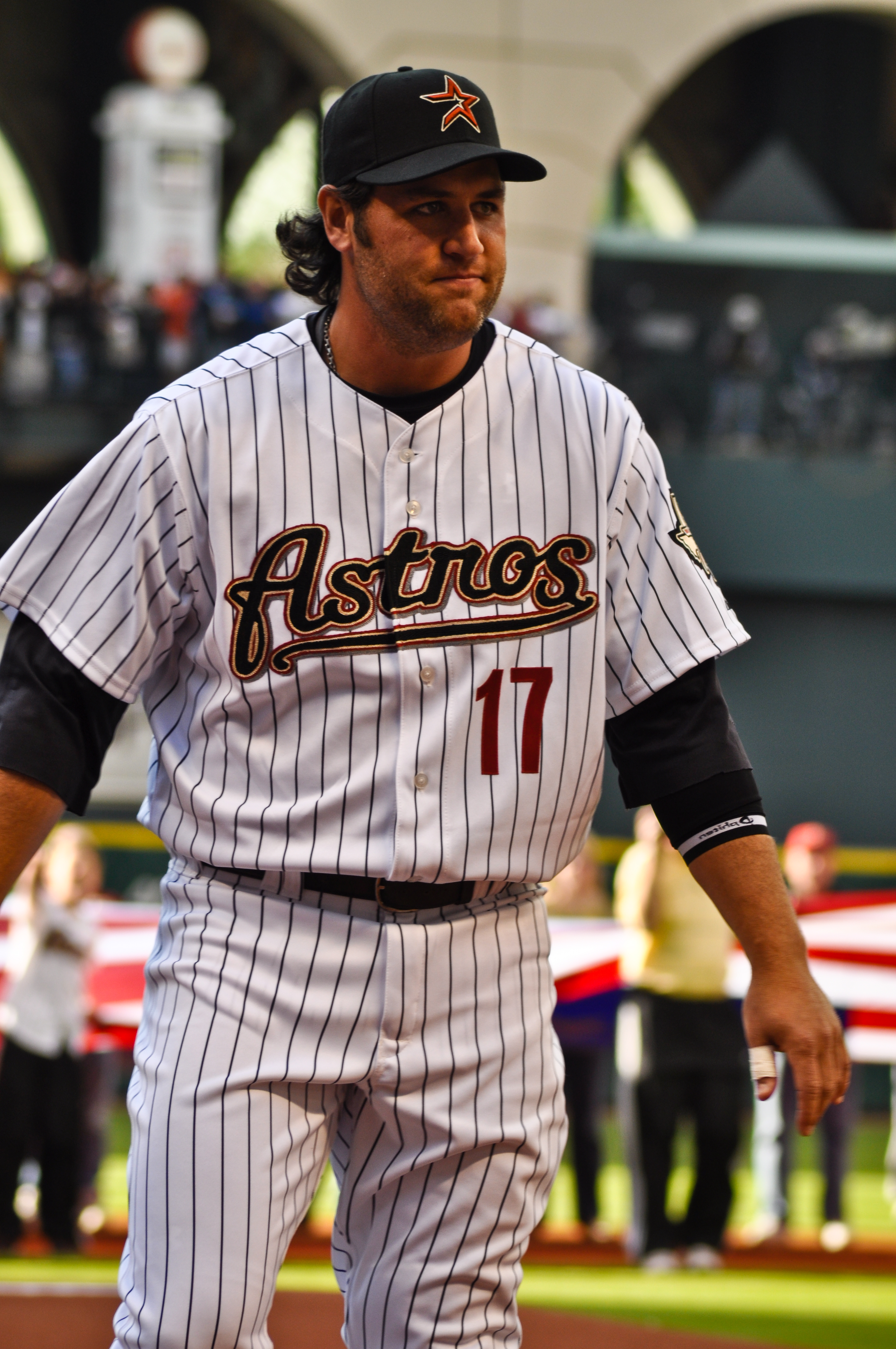
Lance Berkman (1999–2010)

**Astros in the Texas Sports Hall of Fame**
No.	Name	Position	Tenure	Notes
—	Lee Ballanfant	Scout	1961–1970	Born in Waco
3	Pete Runnels	IF	1963–1964	Born in Lufkin
5	Jeff Bagwell	1B; Coach	1991–2005; 2010	
7	Craig Biggio	2B/C	1988–2007	
8, 12, 18, 35	Joe Morgan	2B	1963–1971; 1980	Played mainly with the Cincinnati Reds; born in Bonham
11	Eddie Mathews	3B	1967	Played mainly with the Boston/Milwaukee/Atlanta Braves; born in Texarkana
12, 77	Iván Rodríguez	C	2009	Played mainly with the Texas Rangers
17	Lance Berkman	OF/1B	1999–2010	Born in Waco, raised in New Braunfels, attended Rice University
21	Andy Pettitte	P	2004–2006	Played mainly with the New York Yankees; grew up in Houston
22	Roger Clemens	P	2004–2006	Played mainly with the Boston Red Sox; grew up in Houston, attended the University of Texas at Austin
34	Nolan Ryan	P	1980–1988	Born in Refugio, grew up in Alvin
38	Robin Roberts	P	1965–1966	Played mainly with the Philadelphia Phillies
49	Larry Dierker	P Manager	1964–1977; 1997–2001	

== Personnel ==
=== Active roster ===
Houston Astros 2027 spring training roster
40-man roster		Non-roster invitees	Coaches / other
Pitchers: 56 Ronel Blanco; 69 AJ Blubaugh; 58 Hunter Brown; 50 Mike Burrows; 71 Josh Hader; 61 Josh Hendrickson; 45 Tatsuya Imai; 53 Cristian Javier; 74 Bryan King; 38 Peter Lambert; -- Roddery Muñoz; -- Jackson Nezuh; 70 Ethan Pecko; -- Evan Reifert; 72 Alimber Santa; 62 Bennett Sousa; 66 Miguel Ullola; 17 Kai-Wei Teng; 64 Logan VanWey; 60 Brandon Walter; 39 Hayden Wesneski	Catchers: 21 Yainer Díaz; 37 Collin Price; -- César Salazar; Infielders: 20 Nick Allen; 27 Jose Altuve; 1 Carlos Correa; 29 Raynel Delgado; 15 Isaac Paredes; 3 Jeremy Peña; 8 Christian Walker; Outfielders: 14 Jorge Barrosa; 16 Zach Cole; 9 Zach Dezenzo; 0 Brice Matthews; 11 Cam Smith; 28 Lucas Spence; 26 Taylor Trammell; Designated hitters: 44 Yordan Alvarez		Manager: -- Brad Ausmus; Coaches: 85 Javier Bracamonte (bullpen catcher); 23 Dave Clark (first base); 36 Josh Miller (pitching); 47 Victor Rodriguez (hitting); Vacant (bench); Vacant (third base); 39 active, 0 inactive, 0 non-roster invitees; 7-, 10-, or 15-day injured list; * Not on active roster; ^{†} Suspended list; Roster, coaches, and NRIs updated November 17, 2026; Transactions • Depth chart; → All MLB rosters

== Spring training ==
The Astros have held their spring training at The Ballpark of the Palm Beaches in West Palm Beach, Florida since 2017. They share the stadium with the Washington Nationals.

From 1985 to 2016, the Astros held spring training at Osceola Heritage Park in Kissimmee, Florida.

== Minor league affiliations ==
The Houston Astros farm system consists of seven minor league affiliates.

Class	Team	League	Location	Ballpark	Affiliated
Triple-A	Sugar Land Space Cowboys	Pacific Coast League	Sugar Land, Texas	Constellation Field	2021
Double-A	Corpus Christi Hooks	Texas League	Corpus Christi, Texas	Whataburger Field	2005
High-A	Asheville Tourists	South Atlantic League	Asheville, North Carolina	HomeTrust Park	2021
Single-A	Fayetteville Woodpeckers	Carolina League	Fayetteville, North Carolina	Segra Stadium	2017
Rookie	FCL Astros	Florida Complex League	West Palm Beach, Florida	Cacti Park of the Palm Beaches	2023
Rookie	DSL Astros Blue	Dominican Summer League	Boca Chica, Santo Domingo	Houston Astros Complex	2022
Rookie	DSL Astros Orange	Dominican Summer League	Boca Chica, Santo Domingo	Houston Astros Complex	2022

== Rivalries ==
=== Divisional ===
==== Lone Star Series: Texas Rangers ====
The Silver Boot is awarded annually to the winner of the Lone Star Series

The Lone Star Series (also, Silver Boot Series) is a Major League Baseball rivalry featuring Texas' two major league franchises, the Texas Rangers and Astros. It is an outgrowth of the "natural rivalry" established by MLB as part of interleague play as the Rangers are a member of the American League and the Astros were a member of the National League until 2012.

During interleague play, the winner of the 6-game series was awarded the Silver Boot. A 30-inch (760 mm) tall display of a size-15 cowboy boot cast in silver, complete with a custom, handmade spur. If the series was split (3–3), the winner was the club which scored the most runs over the course of the series.

In 2013, the Astros joined the American League West with the Rangers and changed their rivalry from an interleague to an intra-division rivalry, the Astros played their first game in the American League against the Rangers on Sunday Night Baseball that season. In 2015, both teams made the playoffs and were in a tight division race during most of the season. Both teams qualified for the postseason again in 2023. While the teams had identical regular season records of 90–72, the Astros won the division title for their better head-to-head record (9–4), whilst the Rangers clinched the wild card berth. The Astros and Rangers had their first postseason matchup in the 2023 ALCS, with the Rangers ultimately winning in seven games.

==== Seattle Mariners ====
Fairly recently, the Astros have grown an increasingly competitive rivalry with the Seattle Mariners as both teams have fought handily for control of the division. The resurgence of the Mariners to playoff contention in the early 2020s has fueled the rivalry in competition as the Mariners have often finished within 5 games of the Astros in the division for the past three seasons. The 2022 season saw the Mariners return to playoff success, winning their first series since 2001. The Mariners and Astros were set to face off in the ALDS, but Houston would go on to win the series in a 0–3 sweep. Despite the lone playoff meeting, both teams have grown a recent history of hitting one another with pitches, and even instigating multiple brawls between players. The series was very lopsided in favor of the Astros for multiple decades as Houston leads the all-time regular season series 119–73, including a 3–0 lead in the postseason.

=== American League ===
==== New York Yankees ====
The rivalry between the Astros and the New York Yankees emerged in the mid-2010s after the Astros moved to the American League and eventually ascended to title contenders. The two teams have met in four postseason rounds, all of which were won by Houston. However, like the Astros' rivalry with the Dodgers, animosity grew immediately after the Astros were revealed to have stolen signs during their 2017 championship season, as well as the Yankees' inability to overcome Houston in the playoffs despite fielding equally strong rosters. Both teams are tied all-time with 43 wins apiece, but the Astros own a 13–5 postseason record.

=== National League ===
==== Los Angeles Dodgers ====
The series between the Astros and the Los Angeles Dodgers was as a divisional matchup until Houston moved to the American League. The rivalry regained intensity when the teams met in the 2017 World Series, which the Astros won in seven games. Animosity grew after Astros were discovered to have been stealing signs. The Dodgers lead the all-time series 400–334, both teams are tied in postseason wins 6–6.

== Radio and television ==
Since 2013, the Astros' flagship radio station is KBME, Sportstalk 790 AM (a Fox Sports Radio affiliate). Previously, the team had a partnership with KTRH (740 AM) which went from 1999 to 2012 (both stations are owned by iHeartMedia). This change suddenly made it difficult for listeners outside of Houston itself to hear the Astros, as KTRH runs 50 kilowatts of power day and night, and KBME runs only five kilowatts. As a result, KTRH is audible across much of Central, East, and South Texas, whereas KBME can only be heard in Houston, especially after dark. Milo Hamilton, a veteran voice who was on the call for Hank Aaron's 715th career home run in 1974, retired at the end of the 2012 season, after broadcasting play-by-play for the Astros since 1985. Dave Raymond and Brett Dolan shared play-by-play duty for road games, while Raymond additionally worked as Hamilton's color analyst (while Hamilton called home games only for the past few seasons before his retirement); they were not retained and instead brought in Robert Ford and Steve Sparks to begin broadcasting for the 2013 season.

Spanish language radio play-by-play is handled by Francisco Romero, and his play-by-play partner is Alex Treviño, a former backup catcher for the club.

During the 2012 season Astros games on television were announced by Bill Brown and Jim Deshaies. In the seven seasons before then, Astros games were broadcast on television by Fox Sports Houston, with select games shown on broadcast TV by KTXH. As part of a ten-year, $1 billion deal with Comcast that includes a majority stake jointly held by the Astros and the Houston Rockets, Houston Astros games moved to the new Comcast SportsNet Houston at the beginning of the 2013 season. On September 27, 2013, CSN Houston filed for Chapter 11 Bankruptcy and surprising the Astros who own the largest stake. After being brought out of bankruptcy by DirecTV Sports Networks and AT&T, the channel's name was changed to Root Sports Southwest then later AT&T SportsNet Southwest. In 2024, after parent company Warner Bros. Discovery pulled out of the regional sports network business, the Astros and the Rockets purchased AT&T SportsNet Southwest and rebranded it as the Space City Home Network.

The current television team consists of Todd Kalas, Geoff Blum and reporter Julia Morales.

== Mascots ==
In April 1977, the Houston Astros introduced their first mascot, Chester Charge. Created by Ed Henderson, Chester Charge was a Texas cavalry soldier on a horse. Chester appeared on the field at the beginning of each home game, during the seventh-inning stretch and then ran around the bases at the conclusion of each win. At the blast of a bugle, the scoreboard would light up and the audience would yell, "Charge!"

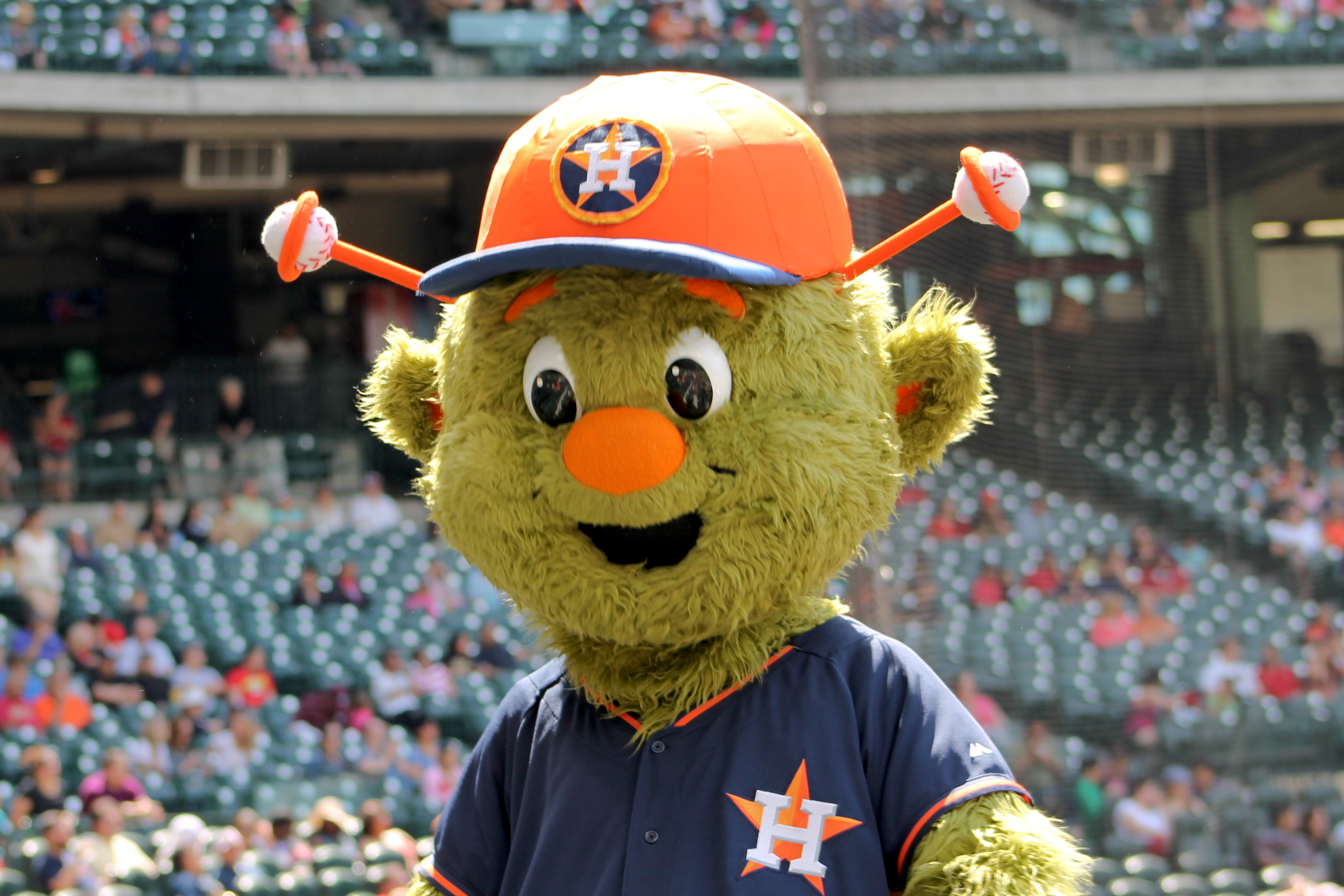
Orbit, Houston Astros mascot from 1990 to 1999, 2013–present

The Astros' current mascot is Orbit, a lime-green outer-space creature wearing an Astros jersey with antennae extending into baseballs. Orbit was the team's official mascot from the 1990 through the 1999 seasons. For the 2000 season, a rabbit named Junction Jack was introduced as the team's mascot with the move from the Astrodome to then Enron Field. (Junction Jack had two "relatives", Junction Julie and Junction Jesse, who were not official mascots). Orbit returned after a 13-year hiatus on November 2, 2012, at the unveiling of the Astros' new look for their 2013 debut in the American League. The name Orbit pays homage to Houston's association with NASA and nickname Space City.

== Notes ==
Awards and achievements
Preceded by Chicago Cubs; 2016	World Series champions Houston Astros; 2017	Succeeded by Boston Red Sox; 2018
Preceded by Atlanta Braves; 2021	World Series champions Houston Astros; 2022	Succeeded by Texas Rangers; 2023
Preceded by St. Louis Cardinals; 2004	National League champions Houston Astros; 2005	Succeeded by St. Louis Cardinals; 2006
Preceded by Cleveland Indians; 2016	American League champions Houston Astros; 2017	Succeeded by Boston Red Sox; 2018
Preceded by Boston Red Sox; 2018	American League champions Houston Astros; 2019	Succeeded by Tampa Bay Rays; 2020
Preceded by Tampa Bay Rays; 2020	American League champions Houston Astros; 2021–2022	Succeeded by Texas Rangers; 2023
