= List of Houston Astros owners and executives =

This is a list of owners and executives of the Houston Astros of Major League Baseball.

== Owners ==
| Person / Group | Start | Finish | Notes | Ref |
|---|---|---|---|---|
| Roy Hofheinz, R. E. "Bob" Smith, Craig F. Cullinan Jr., George Kirksey | 1962 | 1965 | | |
| Roy Hofheinz, R. E. "Bob" Smith | 1965 | 1967 | | |
| Roy Hofheinz | 1967 | 1975 | | |
| GE Money • General Electric Credit Company & Ford Motor Credit Company | 1975 | 1978 | | |
| Ford Motor Credit Company | 1978 | 1979 | | |
| John McMullen | 1979 | 1992 | | |
| Drayton McLane | 1992 | 2011 | | |
| Jim Crane | 2011 | Present | | |

== Team presidents ==
| Name | Start | Finish | Notes | Ref |
|---|---|---|---|---|
| Craig F. Cullinan Jr. | | 1962 | | |
| Roy Hofheinz | 1963 | 1972 | | |
| Reuben W. Askanase | | 1973 | | |
| T. H. (Herb) Weyland | | 1974 | | |
| Sidney Shlenker | 1975 | 1976 | | |
| Tal Smith | 1976 | 1980 | | |
| Al Rosen | 1980 | 1985 | | |
| George Postolos | 2011 | 2013 | | |
| Reid Ryan | 2013 | 2019 | | |
| Jared Crane | 2019 | Present | | |

== General managers ==
| Name | Years |
|---|---|
| Gabe Paul | 1960–1961 (resigned before debut) |
| Paul Richards | 1961–1965 |
| Tal Smith, Spec Richardson, and Grady Hatton | 1965–1967 |
| Spec Richardson | 1967–1975 |
| John Mullen | 1975 |
| Tal Smith | 1975–1980, 2007 |
| Al Rosen | 1980–1985 |
| Dick Wagner | 1985–1987 |
| Bill Wood | 1987–1993 |
| Bob Watson | 1993–1995 |
| Gerry Hunsicker | 1995–2004 |
| Tim Purpura | 2004–2007 |
| Ed Wade | 2007–2011 |
| Jeff Luhnow | 2011–2019 |
| James Click | 2020–2022 |
| Dana Brown | 2023–2026 |
