= Brandon Taubman =

American baseball executive

Brandon Taubman (born October 30, 1985) is an American former baseball executive who was an assistant general manager for the Houston Astros of Major League Baseball (MLB). A former investment banker, he became a member of general manager Jeff Luhnow's front office that rebuilt the Astros, culminating in a World Series title in 2017. Taubman was fired in 2019 for inappropriate comments he made around a group of female reporters following the American League Championship Series (ALCS). He was subsequently placed on MLB's ineligible list.

== Early life ==
Taubman grew up on Long Island, New York, where he was a fan of the New York Mets. He attended Syosset High School. He then attended Cornell University, and graduated with a bachelor's degree in economics in 2007.

== Investment banking career ==
After college, Taubman valued derivatives for Ernst & Young before joining Barclays in 2010. While with Barclays, he spent his spare time playing daily fantasy baseball. Taubman and a close friend developed a projection system which they used to win 58 percent of the time, a significant increase over the break-even mark of 53 percent.

== Baseball career ==
=== Astros' rebuild ===
Taubman was hired by the Houston Astros in 2013 after he responded to their ad for an economist on Fangraphs. He began as a baseball operations analyst under general manager Jeff Luhnow, and was assigned to build a model to improve player valuations. Luhnow was in his second season of an organizational rebuild, which saw the Astros lose a franchise-record 111 games. By 2017, Houston won the World Series. In 2018, Taubman was promoted from senior director of baseball operations to assistant general manager. The Astros enjoyed their third straight 100-win season in 2019, and he received a multi-year contract extension in September.

=== Clubhouse outburst ===
On October 19, 2019, during clubhouse celebrations after the Astros won Game 6 of the 2019 ALCS, Taubman taunted a group of nearby female reporters by aggressively praising Astros relief pitcher Roberto Osuna, an alleged domestic abuser. He repeatedly yelled about six times, "Thank God we got Osuna! I'm so fucking glad we got Osuna!" Osuna had been acquired in 2018 while serving a 75-game suspension after domestic violence accusations. He had been receiving fan and media attention at the time for having just given up a critical two-run home run in the top of the ninth inning, jeopardizing the team's eventual win. Taubman, who was involved in the acquisition of Osuna, was defensive of Osuna's performance as a reliever and overall presence on the team. Taubman had previously complained about the fact that one of the reporters in the group had a practice of tweeting out a domestic violence hotline number whenever Osuna took the mound for the Astros. At the time of Taubman's outburst, that same reporter was wearing a domestic violence awareness bracelet.

On October 21, 2019, another reporter in the group, Stephanie Apstein, published an article in Sports Illustrated describing the incident. Apstein had previously notified the Astros of the upcoming story and had sought comment from Taubman or the team's management, which the team had declined. When the team initially questioned Taubman on the incident, he said his comments in support of Osuna were made in the context of a discussion with someone else and were not directed at the group of female reporters. The Astros took Taubman's statement at face value and issued a press release condemning the article as "misleading and completely irresponsible." After the team issued its initial press release criticizing the story, multiple witnesses came forward to corroborate Apstein's account of the events. Taubman issued an apology for his use of inappropriate language in the clubhouse.

=== MLB ban ===
On October 24, 2019, the Astros fired Taubman and acknowledged that his outburst was directed at the group of reporters, contrary to the team's initial statement. Luhnow said that the initial statement attacking Apstein's reporting "should have never been sent." He also stated that he and other Astros executives were initially inclined to side with Taubman because he had never behaved in such a manner before. Luhnow personally apologized to Apstein on October 25, just before Game 3 of the 2019 World Series. The next day, team owner Jim Crane apologized to Apstein on behalf of the Astros and formally retracted the team's initial statement.

On January 13, 2020, MLB commissioner Rob Manfred announced that Taubman had been placed on MLB's ineligible list through at least the end of the 2020 season. Manfred stated that as a result of an MLB investigation into Taubman's behavior, he had placed Taubman on the ineligible list on November 15, 2019 pending completion of an investigation into sign stealing by the Astros from 2017 to 2018. Taubman was interviewed for the sign stealing investigation and denied any knowledge of it. However, Manfred felt it was not necessary to delve further into Taubman's possible culpability for any role he might have played in the sign stealing, concluding that Taubman's "inappropriate conduct in the clubhouse" after the ALCS win was enough in and of itself to demand a lengthy suspension. Manfred sharply criticized the culture of the Astros' baseball operations department, saying that its emphasis on "results over other considerations" fostered an environment that led to Taubman's outburst and the Astros' initially "inappropriate and inaccurate response." Taubman was eligible to apply for reinstatement after the 2020 World Series, but will be permanently banned from baseball if he commits another "material violation" of MLB rules. Taubman has not re-applied as of 2025.

In an off-camera interview with Frontline, Taubman said that he continues to regret the outburst and tried to make amends, such as volunteering as a data scientist for a domestic violence organization.
