= John Mullen (baseball executive) =

John Wilfred Mullen (September 30, 1924 – April 3, 1991) was an American Major League Baseball executive from 1947 to 1991 with the Boston / Milwaukee / Atlanta Braves and Houston Astros. Born in Calais, Maine, Mullen served in the United States Coast Guard during World War II.

Mullen began his baseball career with the Braves during their Boston tenure in 1947 as an assistant in their minor league and scouting department, then was promoted to full-fledged farm director at age 27 in 1952. He moved with the Braves to Milwaukee in 1953 and then to Atlanta in 1966.

In 1967, Mullen became the executive assistant to general manager Spec Richardson of the Houston Astros. He served as Houston's acting GM, succeeding Richardson, from July 10 to August 7, 1975, when Tal Smith assumed the permanent GM role. He remained with Houston as Smith's top aide until 1979.

Mullen then returned to the Braves as their general manager in May 1979 after the sudden death of Bill Lucas. Led by sluggers Dale Murphy and Bob Horner, the Braves won the 1982 National League West Division championship during Mullen's tenure in this position.

After being replaced by Bobby Cox in October 1985, Mullen served as vice president and assistant general manager of the Braves through 1990. John Mullen died at age 66 in West Palm Beach, Florida, on Wednesday, April 3, 1991, having been found dead in his hotel room that morning. Mullen had a daughter, Kathleen, and two sons, Christopher and Richard, with his wife, Claire.

Said Cox upon Mullen's death, "John had been with the Braves since their Boston days. No one has done more for the Braves than John Mullen. We'll all miss him." The Braves wore his initials, JWM, on the right sleeves of their jerseys during the 1991 season.

Preceded by Spec Richardson	Houston Astros General Manager; 1975; July 10–August 7	Succeeded by Tal Smith
Preceded by Bill Lucas	Atlanta Braves General Manager; 1979–1985	Succeeded by Bobby Cox
