= Bo Porter =

American baseball player and manager (born 1972)

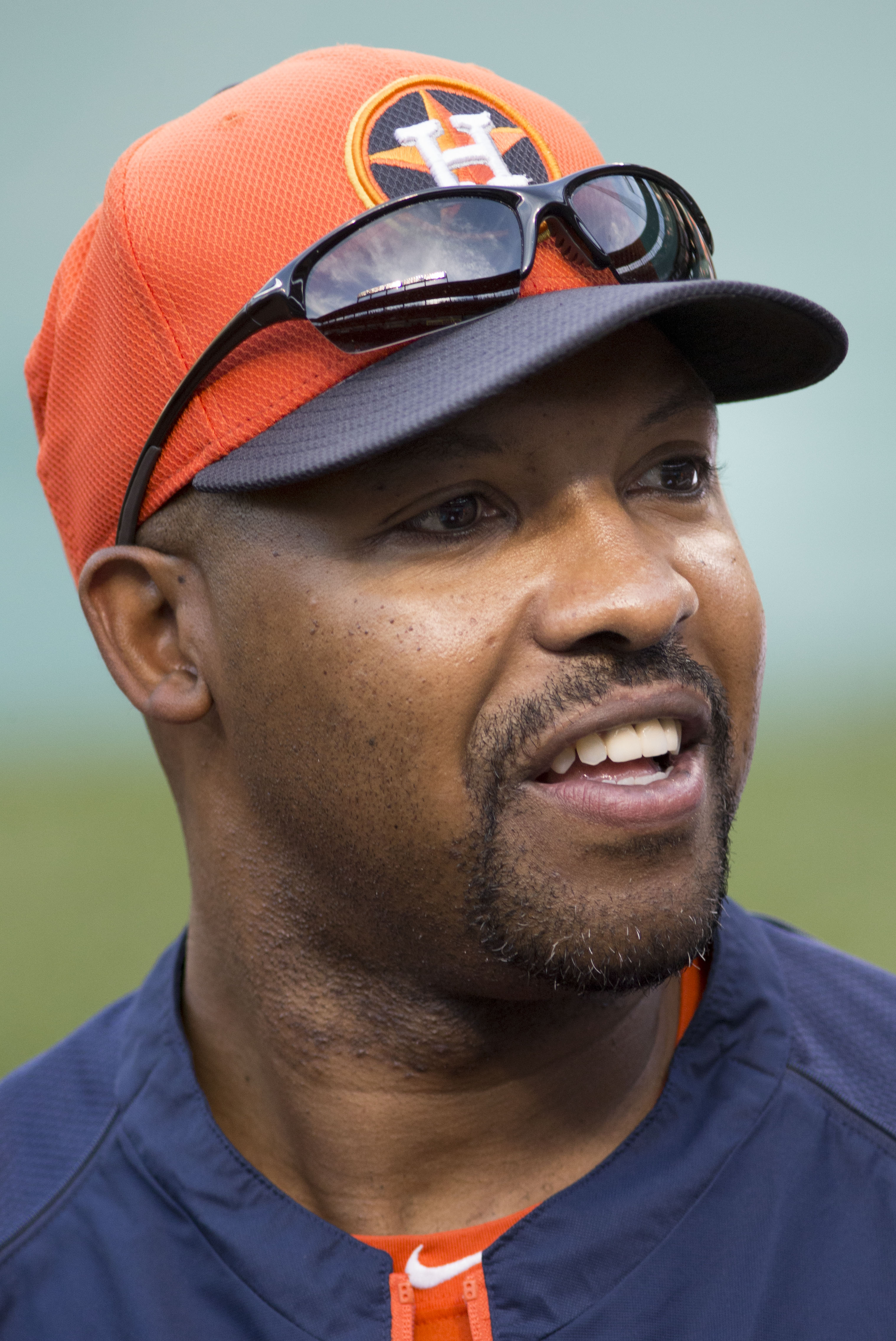
- Porter with the Astros in 2013
- Outfielder / Manager / Coach
- Born: July 5, 1972 (age 54); Newark, New Jersey, U.S.
- Batted: Right Threw: Right

MLB debut
- May 9, 1999, for the Chicago Cubs

Last MLB appearance
- August 7, 2001, for the Texas Rangers

MLB statistics
- Batting average: .214
- Home runs: 2
- Runs batted in: 8
- Managerial record: 110–190
- Winning %: .367
- Stats at Baseball Reference
- Managerial record at Baseball Reference

Teams
- As player: Chicago Cubs (1999); Oakland Athletics (2000); Texas Rangers (2001); As manager: Houston Astros (2013–2014); As coach: Florida Marlins (2007–2009); Arizona Diamondbacks (2010); Washington Nationals (2011–2012); Atlanta Braves (2015–2016); Los Angeles Angels (2024–2025)

Marquis Donnell "Bo" Porter (born July 5, 1972) is an American former professional baseball player, manager, and coach. He is the current first base coach for the Los Angeles Angels of Major League Baseball (MLB). He was a special assistant to the Atlanta Braves general manager and former third base/outfield and base running coach for the Braves. Porter previously served as manager of the Houston Astros for two seasons until his termination on September 1, 2014. During spring training in 2018 he ran the Major League Baseball Players Association free agent camp. In 2019, he became a television broadcaster for the Washington Nationals on the Mid-Atlantic Sports Network.

== Early life ==
Porter was raised in Newark, New Jersey in the South Ward and is a graduate of Weequahic High School. While in high school, Porter was an all-state performer in baseball, football, and basketball.

Porter attended the University of Iowa, and played both baseball and football for the Iowa Hawkeyes. He earned All-Big Ten Conference honors in both sports.

== Playing career ==
Porter was drafted by the Chicago Cubs in the 40th round of the 1993 Major League Baseball draft.

In 1999, Porter made his major-league debut with the Cubs. Following the season, he was selected by the Oakland Athletics in the Rule 5 draft. After the 2000 season, he was selected off waivers by the Texas Rangers. He was granted free agency following the 2001 season, and he played the remainder of his career in the Atlanta Braves and Colorado Rockies minor league systems.

== Post-playing career ==
=== Early career ===
Porter served as the hitting coach for the Class A Greensboro Grasshoppers in 2005 and manager of the Class A-Advanced Jamestown Jammers in 2006. Porter served as Florida Marlins' third base coach and outfield and baserunning instructor from 2007 to 2009.

=== Arizona Diamondbacks ===
Porter became the Diamondbacks third base coach in 2010, after he declined the Marlins' offer to remain with the organization. Following the dismissal of manager A. J. Hinch and promotion of bench coach Kirk Gibson to interim manager in July 2010, Porter was promoted to bench coach.

The Marlins interviewed Porter for their managing job in mid-2010, after they fired Fredi González. Porter was fired by the Diamondbacks following the 2010 season.

=== Washington Nationals ===
Porter was a finalist for the Florida Marlins and Pittsburgh Pirates managerial positions after the 2010 season. The Marlins position eventually went to Florida's interim manager, Edwin Rodríguez. Porter was hired by the Washington Nationals on November 2, 2010, as their new third base coach, taking over from Pat Listach, and took himself out of consideration for the Pittsburgh managerial job when he accepted his position with the Nats before the Pirates finished their interview process.

On September 6, 2012, Porter was involved in a benches-clearing incident during a game at Nationals Park in Washington, D.C., between the Nationals and the Chicago Cubs. Chicago bench coach Jamie Quirk was yelling, apparently at Porter, from inside the Cubs dugout, causing Porter to leave his position in the third base coach's box and approach the third-base dugout to confront Quirk. Ultimately, both teams came out onto the field and Quirk was ejected by umpire Jerry Layne.

=== Houston Astros ===
On September 27, 2012, Porter was announced as the new manager of the Houston Astros for the 2013 season, replacing Brad Mills, who had led the Astros to records of 56–106 and 55–107 in the last two seasons; the Astros had developed a strategy under general manager Jeff Luhnow to develop the team through high draft picks that required rebuilding the farm system and utilizing players at cost-effective rates, such as Jose Altuve. Porter was chosen over fellow candidates Tony DeFrancesco, Dave Martinez, and Tim Bogar. Porter was also the first Astros manager to manage the team in the American League. The Astros won the Opening Day game against the Texas Rangers and then promptly lost six straight games. The win on March 31 was the only time the Astros would be over .500 the whole season, and they finished the season by losing fifteen straight games to go 51–111.

The following season, the Astros were over .500 for two days in the year, starting and ending with their first two wins of the season. By the end of August, they had eclipsed their win total from the past three seasons with 59, and they had their first full month with a winning record for the first time since 2010 in May and August. On September 1, 2014, the Astros fired Porter with the team at a record of 59–79, reportedly due to growing tension between Porter and Luhnow, as Porter did not appreciate perceived challenges to his authority as manager, with Porter stating his gripes at being second-guessed to club owner Jim Crane. One notable annoyance came with the team bringing Mark Appel (the top pick of the previous MLB draft by Houston) to throw a July bullpen session in Houston in the presence of the team pitching coach Brent Strom, which raised objections from Astro players due to perceived special treatment and objections from Porter due to not being notified of the session before it happened. Porter was replaced on an interim basis by Tom Lawless, who managed the final 24 games of the year that resulted in Houston finishing in fourth place in the division, their first non-last place finish in four years with the help of fresh players such as Dallas Keuchel and Chris Carter. Porter was the youngest manager in the majors prior to being fired.

Hinch, formerly manager of the Diamondbacks in 2010 while Porter was third base coach, succeeded him as permanent manager of the Astros for the 2015 season.

=== Atlanta Braves ===
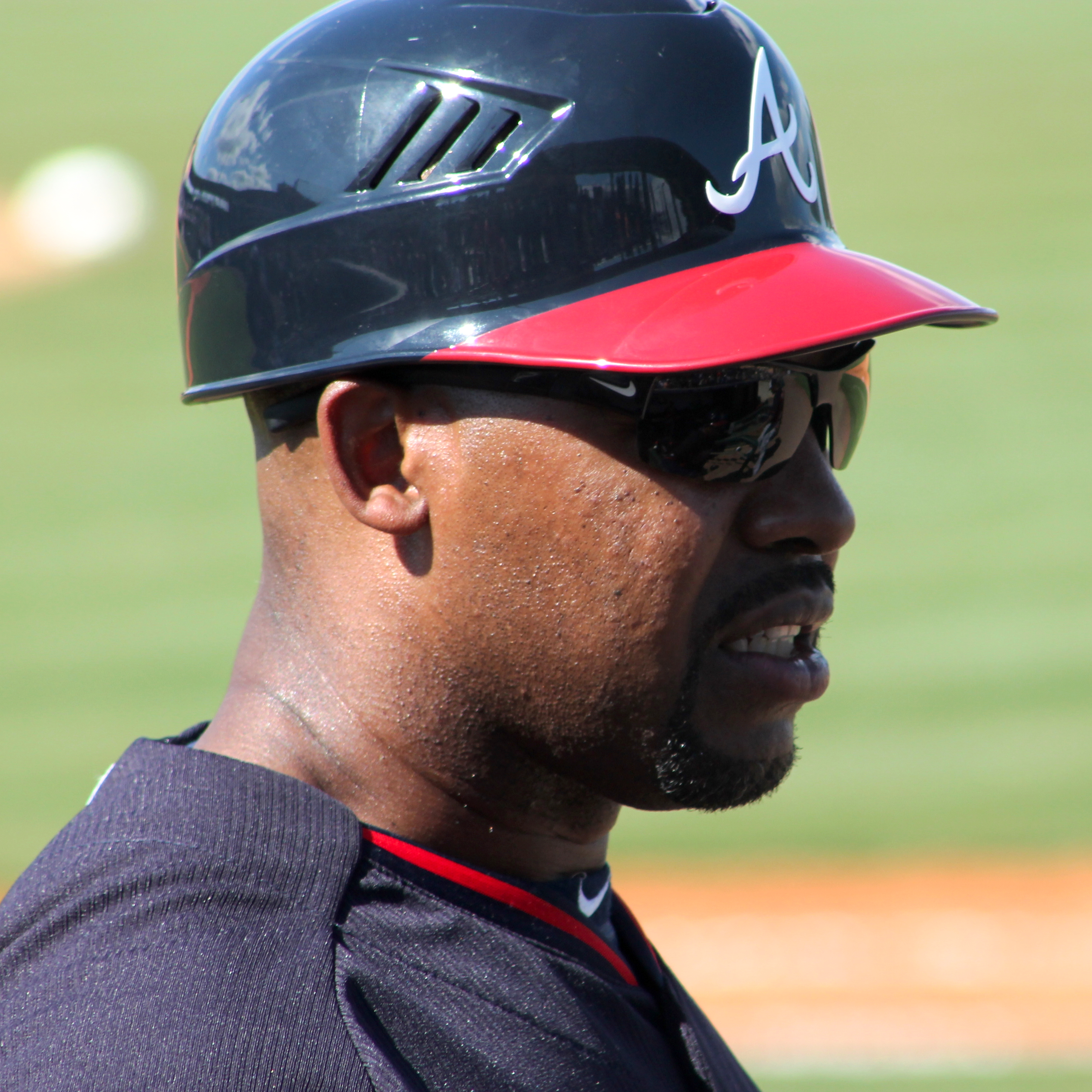
Porter at spring training in 2015

On October 3, 2014, the Atlanta Braves announced coaching changes for the 2015 season which included hiring Porter as third base coach, a position which also included outfield and base-running coaching responsibilities. After the 2016 season concluded, Ron Washington replaced Porter as the Braves' third base coach, and Porter was named a special assistant to Braves general manager John Coppolella.

=== Free agent camp ===
On February 8, 2018, the executive director of the Major League Baseball Players Association, Tony Clark, announced that the MLBPA would open its first spring training camp for unemployed MLB players since 1995 because an historically slow free-agent market during the 2017–2018 offseason had left more than 100 MLB free agents unsigned as MLB teams opened their spring training camps for the 2018 season. This "free agent" camp was intended to provide unsigned free agents who wished to attend it with a simulation of a normal spring training experience and allow them to get in shape for the 2018 season while awaiting a contract offer from a team. Clark announced that Porter would run the free agent camp for the MLBPA. Porter had approximately one week to assemble a staff, find a baseball facility for the camp, and secure temporary housing for the players attending it. Nicknamed "Camp Jobless" by the players, the camp was held at IMG Academy in Bradenton, Florida, with temporary housing in nearby Sarasota. It officially opened on February 11, 2018, with workouts beginning on February 12, the same day MLB teams began their spring training workouts. Porter's coaching staff included former MLB players Chris Chambliss, Tom Gordon, Brian Jordan, Reid Nichols, Dave Winfield, and Dmitri Young. The camp shut down on March 9, 2018.

=== Mid-Atlantic Sports Network ===
On January 25, 2019, the Washington Nationals and the Mid-Atlantic Sports Network (MASN) announced that Porter would replace Ray Knight in 2019 as co-anchor and analyst on the Nats Xtra pre-game and post-game shows that air on MASN before and after Nationals games. His first Nats Xtra broadcast took place on Opening Day on March 28, 2019.

=== Los Angeles Angels ===
On November 13, 2023, it was reported that the Los Angeles Angels would be hiring Porter as their first base coach.

=== Managerial record ===
Team	Year	Regular season					Postseason			
Team	Year	Games	Won	Lost	Win %	Finish	Won	Lost	Win %	Result
HOU	2013	162	51	111	.315	5th in AL West	–	–	–	–
HOU	2014	138	59	79	.428	Fired	–	–	–	–
Total		300	110	190	.367		–	–	–	

== Personal life ==
Porter is from Newark, New Jersey, but has lived in Houston, Texas, since 1996, and founded and is CEO of Future All-Stars Sports Development Academy since 1998.

Porter founded Bo Porter Academy, which opened in August 2022. It is a college preparatory private school for baseball scholar-athletes in middle school and high school. Porter is also the CEO of Bo Porter Enterprise and CORE Multimedia Group.

Porter's wife, Dr. Heather Brown, is an orthodontist, and they have three sons: Bryce, Jaxon, and Jace.

== See also ==
- Rule 5 draft results

Sporting positions
Preceded by Bobby Meacham	Florida Marlins Third base coach 2007–2009	Succeeded by Joey Espada
Preceded by Chip Hale; Kirk Gibson	Arizona Diamondbacks; Third base coach→bench coach 2010	Succeeded by Joel Youngblood; Alan Trammell
Preceded by Pat Listach	Washington Nationals Third base coach 2011–2012	Succeeded by Trent Jewett
Preceded by Doug Dascenzo	Atlanta Braves Third base coach 2015–2016	Succeeded by Ron Washington
