= Jeff Luhnow =

Mexican and American baseball executive (born 1966)

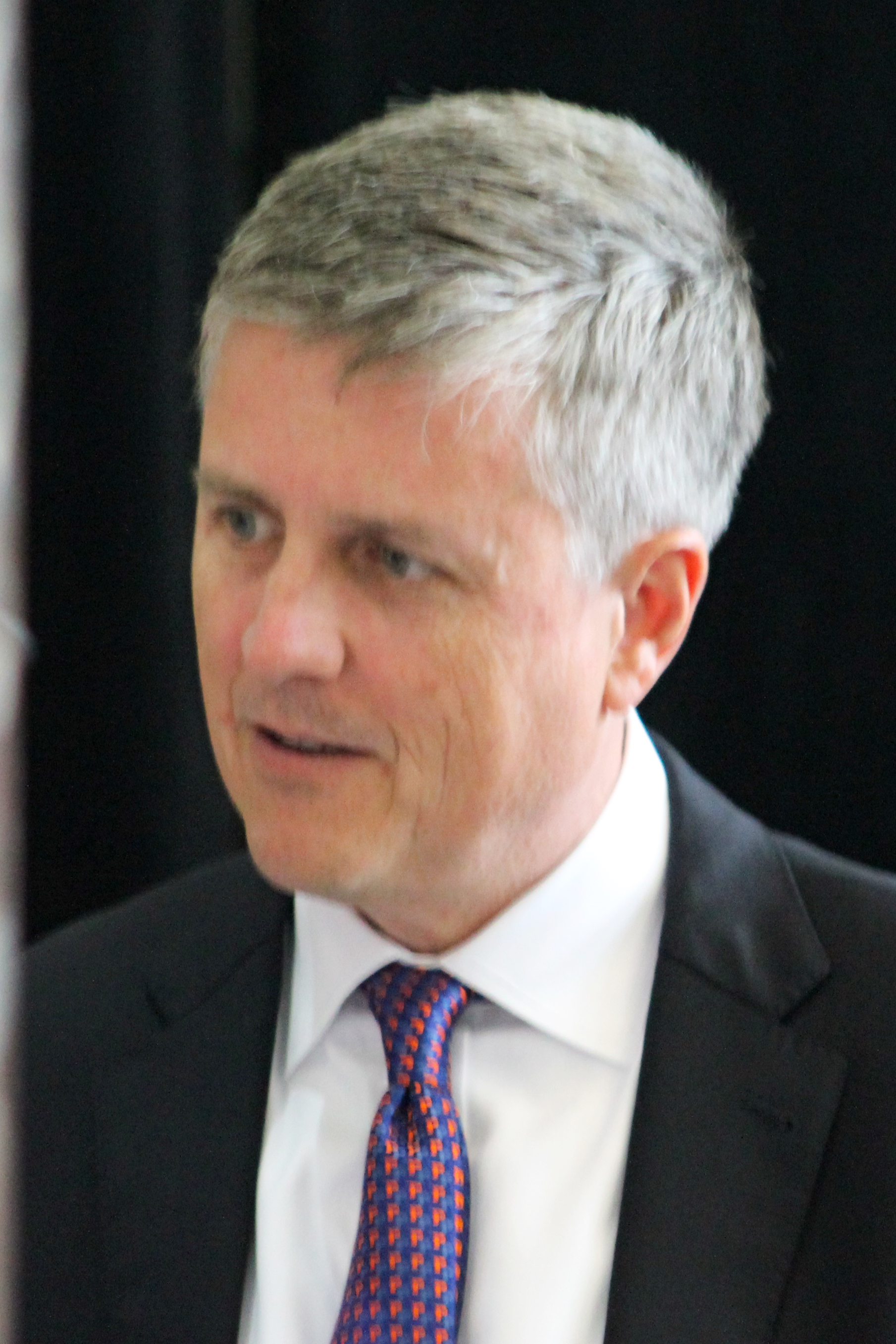
- Born: June 8, 1966 (age 60); Mexico City, Mexico
- Education: University of Pennsylvania; Kellogg School of Management
- Occupations: CEO of Blue Crow Sports Group; Owner and president of Cancún and Leganés

Jeff Luhnow (born June 8, 1966) is a Mexican and American former baseball executive and owner of Mexican club Cancún, he also was the owner of Leganés of Spain and Le Havre AC of France. He worked for the St. Louis Cardinals in their scouting department from 2003 through 2011, before joining the Houston Astros in December 2011. On January 13, 2020, Luhnow was fired by the Astros after Major League Baseball suspended him for the entire 2020 season as a result of the electronic sign-stealing scandal. Prior to working in baseball, Luhnow was a business entrepreneur.

== Early life and education ==
Luhnow was born in Mexico City to American parents, and raised in the Lomas de Chapultepec neighborhood. He is fluent in Spanish. Prior to his birth, his parents had relocated from New York City to Mexico City for business. Luhnow attended schools in Mexico City through 10th grade and a preparatory high school in California for his 11th and 12th-grade years.

He graduated from the Webb School of California and holds dual Bachelor of Science degrees from the University of Pennsylvania in economics and engineering. He earned an MBA from the Kellogg School of Management at Northwestern University.

== Business career ==
Prior to baseball, Luhnow worked as an engineer, management consultant and technology entrepreneur. He worked for McKinsey and Company, a global management consulting firm, for five years. He founded and was president and chief operating officer of Archetype Solutions, and was general manager and vice president of marketing for Petstore.com.

== Baseball career ==
=== St. Louis Cardinals ===
Luhnow joined the front office of the St. Louis Cardinals in 2003. Cardinals owner William DeWitt Jr. had noticed what the Oakland A's had done with their Moneyball tactics and was looking to run his team in a more analytical, data-driven manner when he first hired Luhnow as vice president in 2003. Luhnow knew DeWitt's son-in-law from working at McKinsey & Company and from there, Luhnow met DeWitt and landed the job. Luhnow's hiring initially prompted skepticism, since he had no previous experience in baseball and had not played the sport since high school. He was derided with nicknames like "the accountant" and "Harry Potter."

Luhnow began as the Cardinals' vice president of baseball development, as he established a baseball academy in the Dominican Republic and extended the Cardinals' scouting in Venezuela. The Cardinals promoted him in 2005 to the role of vice president of player procurement, which made him the director of amateur, international and domestic scouting. He was named vice president of scouting and player development in 2006.

During his time with the Cardinals, he developed a reputation for scouting and player development, and he was credited with having a key role in the team's successes in the minor leagues. The Cardinals won five minor league championships under his watch, and had the best system-wide minor league record in 2010. From 2005 to 2007, the first three Cardinals drafts overseen by Luhnow produced 24 future major leaguers, the most of any team during that period. Several players who made important contributions to the Cardinals' victory in the 2011 World Series, including Jaime Garcia, Allen Craig, Jon Jay, and Lance Lynn, were drafted during Luhnow's tenure.

=== Houston Astros ===
The Houston Astros announced Luhnow's hiring as the team's general manager on December 8, 2011, replacing Ed Wade. In making the announcement, team president George Postolos cited Luhnow's past successes in player development and scouting with the Cardinals organization. He also expressed hope that "[Luhnow's] bicultural background [would] be an asset in recruiting players from Latin America and developing the Hispanic market for Los Astros." Luhnow "was so devoted to efficiency that he engaged consultants from McKinsey to audit the organization (and, inevitably, to disrupt the org chart) every year".

After Luhnow's first season, he opted to fire Astros' manager Brad Mills, replacing him with Bo Porter after the 2012 season. Porter was forced to keep most of Mills' coaching staff, with third base coach Dave Trembley and hitting coach John Mallee as Porter's only additions to the staff for the 2013 season. Luhnow and Porter had a falling out during the 2014 season, leading Luhnow to fire Porter. He chose A. J. Hinch as Porter's successor, and allowed Hinch to choose his coaching staff, with the exception of Brent Strom, the pitching coach, whom the team chose to retain. Luhnow received a contract extension at an undisclosed time in 2014.

News of an investigation into potential Cardinals front office personnel hacking into the Astros' baseball operations databases seeking information on player development, evaluation, and compensation broke on June 16, 2015. According to the Los Angeles Times: "MLB issued a statement saying it has cooperated with the investigation but would take no action until 'the investigative process has been completed by federal law enforcement officials.'"

On January 13, 2020, Luhnow and Hinch were suspended for the 2020 season by Rob Manfred, the Commissioner of Baseball, for failing to prevent the Astros from cheating by electronically stealing signs during the 2017 and 2018 seasons. According to Manfred, Luhnow adamantly denied knowing about Astros players banging on a trash can to signal specific pitches, or that employees in the replay room were decoding signs and sending them to the dugout. Manfred stated that while Luhnow didn't know about players' efforts to use technology to steal signs, he should have made it his business to know, given that the general manager is charged with ensuring that the baseball side of a franchise's operations complies with "both standards set by Club ownership and MLB Rules." If Luhnow commits another "material violation" of MLB rules, he will be permanently banned from baseball. Manfred also required Luhnow to undergo "management/leadership training" during his suspension. It is the longest suspension for a baseball executive since former Atlanta Braves general manager John Coppolella was banned from baseball for life in 2017.

According to Manfred, had Luhnow taken "adequate steps" to ensure the Astros followed the rules, the sign stealing operation could have been shut down as early as Manfred's September 2017 memo reminding all clubs that it was illegal to use electronic equipment to steal signs, and certainly by March 2018, when MLB disciplinarian Joe Torre issued a memo which clarified the ban on using technology to steal signs. As a result of that failure, Manfred decided to hold Luhnow "personally responsible for the conduct of his Club." He also harshly criticized the culture of the Astros' baseball operations department, saying that its emphasis on "results over other considerations" fostered an environment that not only made it possible for the sign stealing to continue for as long as it did, but also allowed Luhnow's assistant, Brandon Taubman, to make inappropriate and sexist remarks to female reporters after the Astros clinched the 2019 pennant. Taubman was fired for lying about the comments, and was subsequently placed on the ineligible list through at least the 2020 season. Manfred later claimed that Luhnow's failure to notify the players about the 2017 memo was a major reason why MLB didn't discipline any players for their roles in the scandal. Manfred told ESPN that had he suspended or fined any players for their roles, the MLB Players Association (MLBPA) would have challenged such discipline "on the basis that we never properly informed them of the rules."

Hours after MLB announced its sanctions, Astros owner Jim Crane fired Luhnow and Hinch. Crane said: "Neither of them started this but neither of them did anything about it".

== Soccer career ==
=== Cancún F.C. ===
In May 2021, Luhnow had shown interest in acquiring a Mexican soccer team, during which time he was part of a group that negotiated the purchase of Atlético San Luis, although the purchase agreement did not materialize. Subsequently, in January 2022, Jeff Luhnow headed an investment fund that completed the purchase of the Mexican team Cancún that participates in the Liga de Expansión MX. The purchase was approved by the league owners' meeting on June 1, 2022, making it official.

=== CD Leganés ===
On June 23, 2022, Luhnow bought Leganés who were then in LaLiga Smartbank through the company Blue Crow Sports. In 2024, the club was promoted to La Liga after winning the LaLiga Smartbank title. In June 2026, Luhnow parted ways with the club after Blue Crow sold the majority of Leganés' shares to the Emirati fund 885 Capital.

=== Le Havre AC ===
In May 2025, it was reported that Luhnow was interested in purchasing the French team Le Havre AC, which competes in Ligue 1, the top tier of French football. The acquisition was finalized in June 2025 through Blue Crow Sports.

In July 2026, Luhnow left Blue Crow following an internal company restructuring and legal disputes related to the acquisition of Le Havre AC.
