= A. J. Hinch =

American baseball player and manager (born 1974)

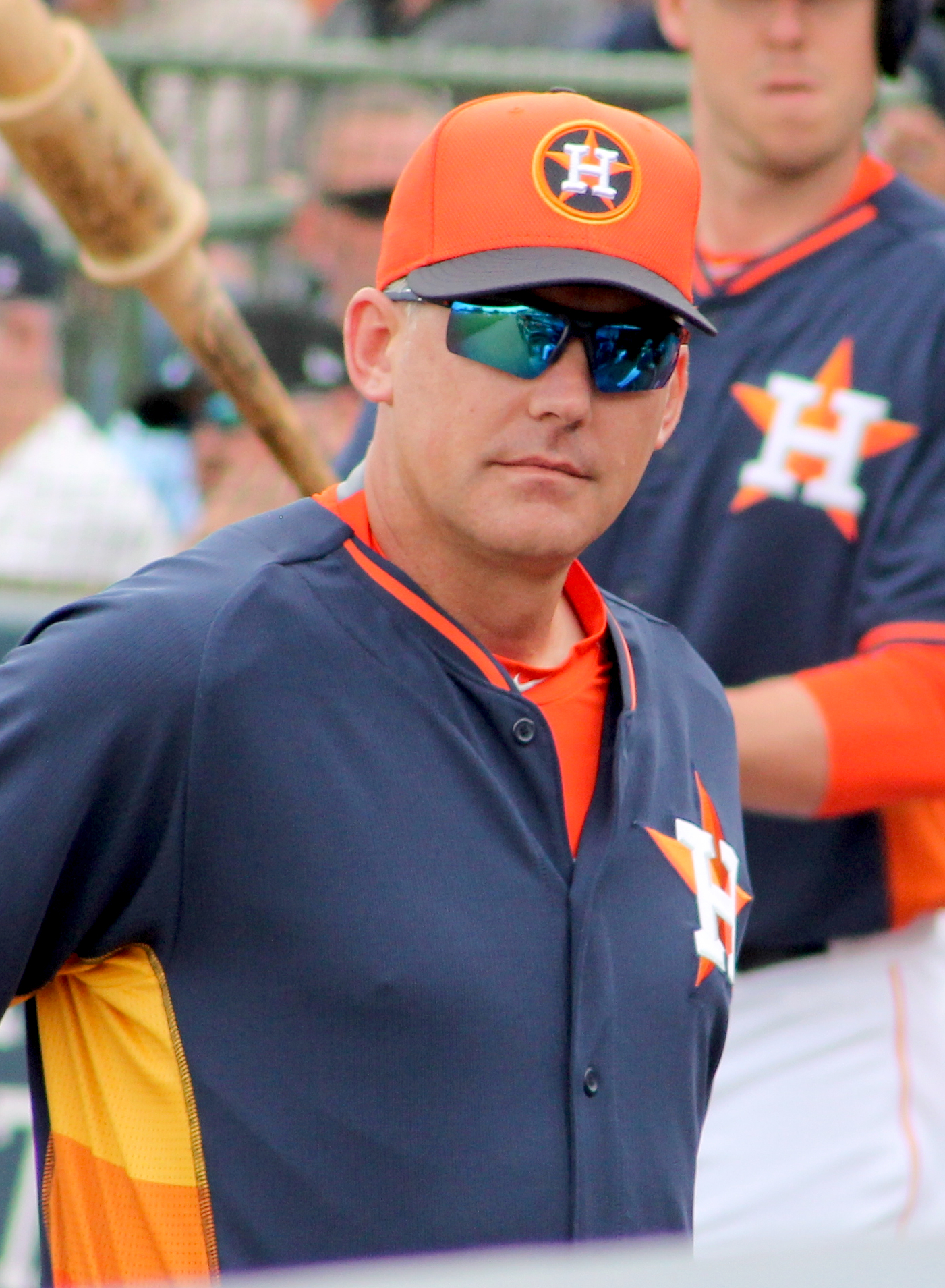
- Hinch with the Houston Astros in 2015

Detroit Tigers – No. 14
- Catcher / Manager
- Born: May 15, 1974 (age 52); Waverly, Iowa, U.S.
- Batted: Right Threw: Right

MLB debut
- April 1, 1998, for the Oakland Athletics

Last MLB appearance
- September 24, 2004, for the Philadelphia Phillies

MLB statistics (through July 5, 2026)
- Batting average: .219
- Home runs: 32
- Runs batted in: 112
- Managerial record: 1,008–920
- Winning %: .523
- Stats at Baseball Reference
- Managerial record at Baseball Reference

Teams
- As player: Oakland Athletics (1998–2000); Kansas City Royals (2001–2002); Detroit Tigers (2003); Philadelphia Phillies (2004); As manager: Arizona Diamondbacks (2009–2010); Houston Astros (2015–2019); Detroit Tigers (2021–present)

Career highlights and awards
- World Series champion (2017)
Medals
Representing United States
Men's baseball
Summer Olympics
| Bronze medal – third place | 1996 Atlanta | Team |
World Junior Baseball Championship
| Silver medal – second place | 1992 Monterrey | Team |
| Bronze medal – third place | 1991 Brandon | Team |

Andrew Jay Hinch (born May 15, 1974) is an American professional baseball coach and former catcher who is the manager of the Detroit Tigers of Major League Baseball (MLB). As a member of Team USA, Hinch won a bronze medal at the 1996 Summer Olympics before playing in MLB for the Oakland Athletics (1998–2000), Kansas City Royals (2001–2002), Detroit Tigers (2003), and Philadelphia Phillies (2004).

Born in Iowa, Hinch attended Midwest City High School in Oklahoma, and then Stanford University, where he played college baseball for the Cardinal. In the 1996 MLB draft, the Athletics selected him in the third round, and he appeared in 350 games over seven major league seasons.

Following his playing career, Hinch managed the Arizona Diamondbacks from May 2009 to July 2010, and became vice president of professional scouting for the San Diego Padres from September 2010 to August 2014. Hinch joined the Houston Astros as manager from 2015 through 2019, guiding the club through one of the most successful periods in franchise history. They won the 2017 World Series, two American League (AL) pennants, and over 100 regular season wins each from 2017 to 2019, including a club-record 107 in the latter. Due to being implicated in the Astros' sign stealing scandal the following year, Hinch was suspended by MLB for one year and fired by the team. Prior to the 2021 season, the Tigers hired Hinch as manager, and he guided the club to their next playoff appearance in 2024.

== Early life ==
Hinch lived in Nashua, Iowa, until he was eight, when he moved to Oklahoma. He is a 1992 graduate of Midwest City High School in Midwest City, Oklahoma, where, as a senior, he was the 1992 National Gatorade Player of the Year in baseball. He was drafted in the second round of the Major League Baseball draft but elected to attend Stanford University, where he was a third-round pick after his junior year in 1995. He decided to return to school and was again a third-round pick as a senior in 1996. At Stanford he joined Delta Tau Delta International Fraternity. Hinch won a bronze medal for the United States at the 1996 Atlanta Olympics and was named to the 1998 Topps All-Star Rookie Team. Hinch is married to his wife, Erin Hinch, with two daughters Haley and Kaitlin.

== Playing career ==
Hinch was selected by the Oakland Athletics in the third round of the 1996 Major League Baseball draft. He signed with the Athletics in June 1996. He debuted with the Athletics in 1998 and remained with the team through the 2000 season.

In the 2000–01 offseason, Hinch was traded to the Kansas City Royals with Ángel Berroa as part of a 3-team trade that sent Ben Grieve from the Athletics to the Tampa Bay Devil Rays, Cory Lidle from the Devil Rays to the Athletics, Roberto Hernández from the Devil Rays to the Royals, and Johnny Damon and Mark Ellis to the Athletics from the Royals.

Hinch was released by the Royals after the 2002 season. He signed as a minor league free agent with the Cleveland Indians, but was purchased by the Detroit Tigers from the Indians in March 2003. He signed with the Philadelphia Phillies for the 2004 season, splitting the year between the majors and Triple-A. He spent all of 2005 with the Phillies' Triple-A affiliate before retiring. In an eight-season major league career, Hinch had a .219 batting average with 32 home runs and 112 runs batted in in 350 games.

== Managing career ==
=== Arizona Diamondbacks ===
After the 2005 season, the Arizona Diamondbacks hired Hinch as their manager of minor league operations. Even while playing, he was planning his post-playing career. He went so far as to go to the 2003 general manager's winter meetings to look for future job opportunities and contacts. In July 2006, Baseball America named him one of baseball's "10 to watch" in the next 10 years for his promise as a farm director and future general manager. In August 2006, the Diamondbacks named Hinch director of player development.

Hinch was named manager of the Arizona Diamondbacks on May 8, 2009, replacing Bob Melvin, despite never having managed or coached a team at any level. At age 34 years and 357 days, Hinch became the youngest person to be named manager of a Major League team since Eric Wedge (34 years, 275 days).

Hinch, along with general manager Josh Byrnes, was fired from the Diamondbacks on July 1, 2010, following a 31–48 start to the 2010 season. Overall, Hinch compiled an 89–123 record in 212 games; his .420 winning percentage ranks as the lowest for a non-interim manager in Diamondbacks history.

=== San Diego Padres ===
The San Diego Padres hired Hinch as vice president of professional scouting on September 21, 2010. He reunited with Byrnes, who was the Padres' senior vice president of baseball operations and in 2011 would become their general manager. Hinch served as interim GM in 2014 along with Omar Minaya and Fred Uhlman, Jr. He resigned from the position on August 5, 2014.

=== Houston Astros ===
Hinch was named manager of the Houston Astros on September 29, 2014, replacing Bo Porter, who had been fired on September 1, 2014. (Note: During Hinch's tenure as the Diamondbacks' manager, Porter had served as third base coach in 2010.) In the 2015 season, Hinch led the Astros to an 86–76 record and a wild card berth. It was Houston's first playoff appearance since their 2005 World Series run. In the Wild Card Game, the Astros defeated the New York Yankees in Yankee Stadium, 3–0, to advance to the American League Division Series (ALDS). Hinch's Astros took a 2–1 ALDS lead over the Kansas City Royals. In Game 4, the Astros led the Royals, 6–2, going into the 8th inning; however, the Royals came back to win, 9–6, and the Astros went on to lose Game 5 and the series.

In 2016, Houston began the season 7–17. Although their play improved during the season, the Astros finished 84–78 and did not qualify for the playoffs.

In 2017, the Astros achieved a club-record of 50 wins in 74 games and finished the regular season 101–61, winning their first AL West division title, first division title in 16 years, and first since joining the AL. The 2017 postseason began for the Astros with the ALDS at home. Hinch guided the team past the Boston Red Sox in four games, with his decision to have Justin Verlander pitch in relief in the deciding Game 4 receiving attention. In the American League Championship Series (ALCS), he led the Astros against the Yankees in Houston's first League Championship Series (LCS) appearance in 12 years. After his team won the first two games at home, the Yankees rallied with three wins in New York, with Game 4's loss resulting from the bullpen giving up six combined runs in the 7th and 8th after Hinch removed pitcher Lance McCullers Jr after only six innings. With a pivotal Game 6 in Houston and Justin Verlander on the mound, the Astros won the game, 7–1. In Game 7, he chose Charlie Morton as his starter. Morton tossed five innings, and Hinch brought in McCullers to pitch the final four in relief as the Astros shutout the Yankees, 4–0. Thus, Houston clinched their first-ever AL pennant, and first overall pennant in 12 years, to advance to the 2017 World Series,

The Astros faced the Los Angeles Dodgers in the World Series and won in 7 games. Hinch deployed the same four starting pitchers as he had in the ALCS: Dallas Keuchel, Verlander, McCullers Jr, and Morton, though only McCullers and Morton received wins as two relievers, Chris Devenski and Joe Musgrove, were credited with the other two. In Game 7, Morton pitched the final four innings as the Astros won, 5–1, to clinch their first-ever title. With the win, Hinch earned his 14th playoff victory as manager of the Astros, establishing a club record that eclipsed the 13 attained by Phil Garner.

On August 30, 2018, the Astros signed Hinch to a four-year extension.

On May 28, 2019, Hinch won his 500th game as manager. The Astros won a franchise-record 107 games during the regular season, but lost to the Washington Nationals 4 games to 3 in World Series. On January 13, 2020, during the offseason, Hinch and Jeff Luhnow, the team's general manager, were suspended one year for violating MLB policies in a sign stealing scandal in 2017. The investigation revealed that Hinch did not approve of the players using a replay monitor to decode signs, and even went as far as to wreck the monitor on at least two occasions. However, he admitted that he did not stop the practice or explicitly let it be known that he disapproved of it. Baseball Commissioner Rob Manfred harshly criticized Hinch for not doing more to stop the scheme. According to Manfred, the manager is responsible for "ensuring that the players both understand the rules and adhere to them.” Manfred concluded that there was "no justification for Hinch's failure to act,” since Hinch was the players’ immediate supervisor. If Hinch commits further "material violations" of baseball rules, he will be permanently banned from baseball. Hinch fully expected to be suspended, but believed Manfred would only suspend him for a month at most.

The year-long suspension was the second-most severe punishment in baseball history meted out to a manager for in-game misconduct. The only longer suspension was for St. Louis Browns manager Jack O'Connor, who was banned for life for trying to throw the 1910 American League batting title to Nap Lajoie by bribing the official scorer to change a hit on error to a hit in the final game of the season. Boston Red Sox manager Alex Cora also received a year-long suspension for his role in the scandal for his actions as the Astros' bench coach.

On the same day, Astros owner Jim Crane fired Hinch and Luhnow, saying, "Neither one of them started this but neither one of them did anything about it." Crane said that he was going beyond MLB's sanctions because he had "higher standards for the city and the franchise." Largely on the strength of his final three seasons–all but one of the four 100-win seasons in franchise history at the time of his firing–Hinch ended his tenure as the second winningest manager in Astros history, behind only Bill Virdon. As of the end of the 2019 season, his .594 winning percentage was the highest in franchise history.

=== Detroit Tigers ===
Hinch's suspension ended after the 2020 season. He was scheduled to interview for the managerial openings with the Detroit Tigers and Chicago White Sox. When the White Sox unexpectedly hired Tony La Russa, they issued a press release mistakenly bearing Hinch's facsimile signature, suggesting Hinch was the team's original choice until owner Jerry Reinsdorf intervened. On October 30, 2020, Hinch was named the manager of the Tigers, agreeing on a multi-year contract.

In 2024, Hinch led the Tigers to a wild card berth on an 86–76 third-place finish in the AL Central division. Left-hander Tarik Skubal emerged as the staff ace, winning the AL Triple Crown, the first Tiger do to so since Verlander in 2011. A 55–63 record shortly after the trade deadline did not advertise a playoff destiny after having dealt starter Jack Flaherty, outfielder Mark Canha, reliever Andrew Chafin, and catcher Carson Kelly. Their playoff seeding juxtaposed them with the Houston Astros in the AL Wild Card Series (WCS). As such, Hinch became the third manager in MLB history to face his former team whom he led to a World Series title in a postseason tournament. (Note: Hinch joined Terry Francona, managing the Cleveland Indians versus the Boston Red Sox in the 2016 American League Division Series, and Billy Martin, with the Oakland Athletics versus the New York Yankees in the 1981 American League Championship Series.)

During the 2025 season, Hinch and the Tigers agreed to a long-term contract extension running through at least the 2027 season.

Against the Yankees on June 29, 2026, Hinch recorded his 1,000th victory as a manager.

=== Managerial record ===
As of July 5, 2026

| Team | Year | Regular season | | | | | Postseason | | | |
| Team | Year | Games | Won | Lost | Win % | Finish | Won | Lost | Win % | Result |
|---|---|---|---|---|---|---|---|---|---|---|
| ARI | 2009 | 133 | 58 | 75 | .436 | 5th in NL West | – | – | – | |
| ARI | 2010 | 79 | 31 | 48 | .392 | (fired) | – | – | – | |
| ARI total | | 212 | 89 | 123 | .420 | | – | – | – | |
| HOU | 2015 | 162 | 86 | 76 | .531 | 2nd in AL West | 3 | 3 | .500 | Lost ALDS (KC) |
| HOU | 2016 | 162 | 84 | 78 | .519 | 3rd in AL West | – | – | – | |
| HOU | 2017 | 162 | 101 | 61 | .623 | 1st in AL West | 11 | 7 | .611 | Won World Series (LAD) |
| HOU | 2018 | 162 | 103 | 59 | .636 | 1st in AL West | 4 | 4 | .500 | Lost ALCS (BOS) |
| HOU | 2019 | 162 | 107 | 55 | .660 | 1st in AL West | 10 | 8 | .556 | Lost World Series (WAS) |
| HOU total | | 810 | 481 | 329 | .594 | | 28 | 22 | .560 | |
| DET | 2021 | 162 | 77 | 85 | .475 | 3rd in AL Central | – | – | – | |
| DET | 2022 | 162 | 66 | 96 | .407 | 4th in AL Central | – | – | – | – |
| DET | 2023 | 162 | 78 | 84 | .481 | 2nd in AL Central | – | – | – | – |
| DET | 2024 | 162 | 86 | 76 | .531 | 3rd in AL Central | 4 | 3 | .571 | Lost ALDS (CLE） |
| DET | 2025 | 162 | 87 | 75 | .537 | 2nd in AL Central | 4 | 4 | .500 | Lost ALDS (SEA） |
| DET | 2026 | 162 | 76 | 86 | .469 | | – | – | – | – |
| DET Total | | 972 | 470 | 502 | .484 | | 8 | 7 | .533 | |
| Total | | 1,994 | 1,040 | 954 | .522 | | 35 | 26 | .574 | |

== See also ==
- Houston Astros award winners and league leaders
- List of Major League Baseball All-Star Game managers
- List of Olympic medalists in baseball
