= John McMullen (engineer) =

American businessman (1918–2005)

- Born: May 10, 1918; Jersey City, New Jersey, U.S.
- Died: September 16, 2005 (aged 87)
- Education: United States Naval Academy

John J. McMullen, Ph.D (May 10, 1918 – September 16, 2005) was an American naval architect, businessman, and marine engineer, and former owner of the New Jersey Devils and Houston Astros. He founded the engineering firm John J. McMullen & Associates, and was the owner of Norton Lilly International a shipping agent now based out of Mobile, Alabama, from 1972 until 2002.

== Personal life ==
McMullen was born in 1918 in Jersey City, New Jersey. He grew up in Montclair, New Jersey, where he attended Montclair High School, graduating in 1936. He later graduated from the United States Naval Academy in 1940 and rose to the rank of commander during a 15-year naval career. The Naval Academy honored his naval and ice hockey backgrounds by naming their hockey team's rink after him. He received a master's degree in naval architecture and engineering from the Massachusetts Institute of Technology and a doctorate in mechanical engineering from the Swiss Federal Institute of Technology in Zürich. He married Jacqueline Everhart and had three children. He died at his Montclair, New Jersey home in September 2005.

== Sports teams ownership ==
McMullen was inspired to bring sports to where he lived in Montclair by Clary Anderson, the legendary coach of Montclair High School before moving on to coach football and baseball at Montclair State University in Upper Montclair, New Jersey. McMullen's first involvement in sports ownership was a minority partner in the New York Yankees, as owned by George Steinbrenner that McMullen purchased a stake in 1974. He served as a partner for a time in the 1970s before selling, noting to the press that "Nothing is so limited as being one of George's limited partners."

McMullen also owned the Houston Astros, buying the team from Ford Motor Credit Company in July 1979 as part of a partnership that saw McMullen have the majority of shares at 33% as managing partner that was done for an estimated total of $19 million. His tenure was characterized by high and low moments. Under McMullen's ownership, the Astros signed Alvin, Texas native Nolan Ryan to baseball's first $1 million free agent contract and reached the playoffs for the first time in franchise history in 1980.

McMullen fired Tal Smith, architect of the first Astro playoff team, days after the season ended reportedly due to McMullen resenting the attention Smith and manager Bill Virdon received. Smith stated that McMullen once asked him what an RBI was. Even replacing Smith did not stop McMullen from bitter comments, as he was quoted as calling Smith "a despicable human being" in 1983 after saying the roster on the field was better than the one when he bought the team (at the time he made the comments, the Astros were in last), which spurred a lawsuit by Smith that resulted in a quiet settlement after McMullen failed to quash the lawsuit in court. After the 1988 season, McMullen elected to not pay more to retain Ryan (asking him to take a paycut), who left for the Texas Rangers in free agency and won his 300th game and 5,000th strikeout in the five seasons spent with the team, which he went into the Baseball Hall of Fame with instead of the nine seasons spent with Houston. He also complained that the team needed more support in the city, refusing to deny claims of moving the team to Washington even during the 1986 season. He also allowed announcer Gene Elston, popular with Houston listeners as the team announcer since the inception of the team in 1962, to be fired by general manager Dick Wagner at the end of the 1986 season.

McMullen had a close friendship with Yogi Berra. When Berra was fired as manager of the New York Yankees in 1985, McMullen offered him a job coaching the Astros, which Berra accepted. Phil Garner described McMullen as "tough but he was always fair and this was a first-class organization when he was here."

McMullen started the process of wanting to sell the team in 1990, expressing a desire to do in part due to age and the rising value of the team. On July 24, 1992, it was announced that McMullen had come to an agreement with Drayton McLane to sell the team, which also included the lease on the Astrodome for a total of $117 million; approval by the league owners followed in the fall. It was during this season that the Astros were to play 26 consecutive road games from July 27 through August 23, due to the 1992 Republican National Convention being held at the Astrodome from August 17–20 (since the RNC required a couple of weeks to prepare the staging), as agreed on by McMullen without getting approval from the Players Association. McMullen stated his regret at his decision, stating that he wished he had told the RNC "to go to hell". The 1992 season saw the Astros average roughly over 14,000 per game in attendance, while the 1993 season saw an average of 25,000. Under his 14-year tenure as owner (1979-1992), the Astros had eight winning seasons that saw three postseason appearances with a record of 1,129-1,088 in the regular season and 6-10 in the postseason. McMullen was behind the acquisition of players that would play a part in the Astros resurgence in the late 1990s, such as draft picks Craig Biggio and trade prospect Jeff Bagwell. McMullen went through four general managers during this time from Tal Smith (1979–1980), Al Rosen (1980–1985), Dick Wagner (1985–1987), and Bill Wood (hired in 1987); he went through four different managers: Bill Virdon (fired in 1982), Bob Lillis (1982–1985), Hal Lanier (1986–1988), and Art Howe (hired in 1989, fired by McLane in 1993).

McMullen was involved in the purchase of one further professional team with the Colorado Rockies of the National Hockey League. The Rockies were intended to move out of Colorado before McMullen bought the team, but a flurry of sales complicated things. Arthur Imperatore Sr. had bought the team in 1978 and planned to move them to East Rutherford, New Jersey in 1980, but he sold them to New York cable executive Peter Gilbert in 1981, who had pledged to keep the team there. However, in February 1982, Gilbert wanted permission to move to New Jersey. It was in May that rumors spread that McMullen and a group of investors were a candidate to buy the team. They had a verbal agreement, but Gilbert listened to a meeting with George Steinbrenner before going back to McMullen, with a formal purchase occurring on May 28 that allowed the team to move to New Jersey. McMullen's team of investors included former New Jersey Governor Brendan Byrne and lawyer John C. Whitehead, and the group struck a deal with the New Jersey Sports and Exposition Authority and its Meadowlands complex for a thirty year deal. The total costs for territorial and TV payments to the three teams in the general area (New York Rangers, New York Islanders, Philadelphia Flyers) and transfer fee was reported as costing a total of more than $30 million. The team later re-christened the New Jersey Devils. He instituted the Dr. John J. McMullen Award in 1984, presented annually to "an individual or individuals who have supported amateur hockey throughout the state". In 1987, he hired Lou Lamoriello as team president, hiring him from Providence College where he had served as athletic director. Lamoriello named himself as general manager in 1987 and presided over the team for the next 28 years with McMullen allowing him to make moves on his free watch, which saw them go to their first winning season that year. The team got better and better but it was not always a smooth ride in New Jersey as even in the wake of them reaching the 1995 Stanley Cup Final, there was talk of moving the team to Nashville, Tennessee due to a lack of satisfaction McMullen had in the lease of the Byrne Meadowlands Arena, which was to run until 2012. The team ultimately stayed in New Jersey. From 1995 to 2012, the team reached the Stanley Cup Final five times. The team won the Stanley Cup twice during his ownership, in 1995 and 2000. Just before winning the second Cup, McMullen sold the team to YankeeNets. After his death, the team dedicated the 2005–06 season to him, wearing a small "JM" patch on their jerseys.

== Commemoration ==
John J. McMullen is commemorated in the U.S. Naval Academy's McMullen Hockey Arena, the Academy's biennial McMullen Naval History Symposium, and the McMullen Seapower Fellowship and Keynote McMullen Seapower Lecture that are associated with the naval history symposium.

McMullen was awarded the Naval Academy's Distinguished Graduate Award in 2000.

The New Jersey Devils honored McMullen by making him the first inductee into the team's Ring of Honor in 2017 with the installation of a permanent banner at the Prudential Center in Newark, New Jersey.
