= Drayton McLane =

American billionaire businessman (born 1936)

Drayton McLane Jr.
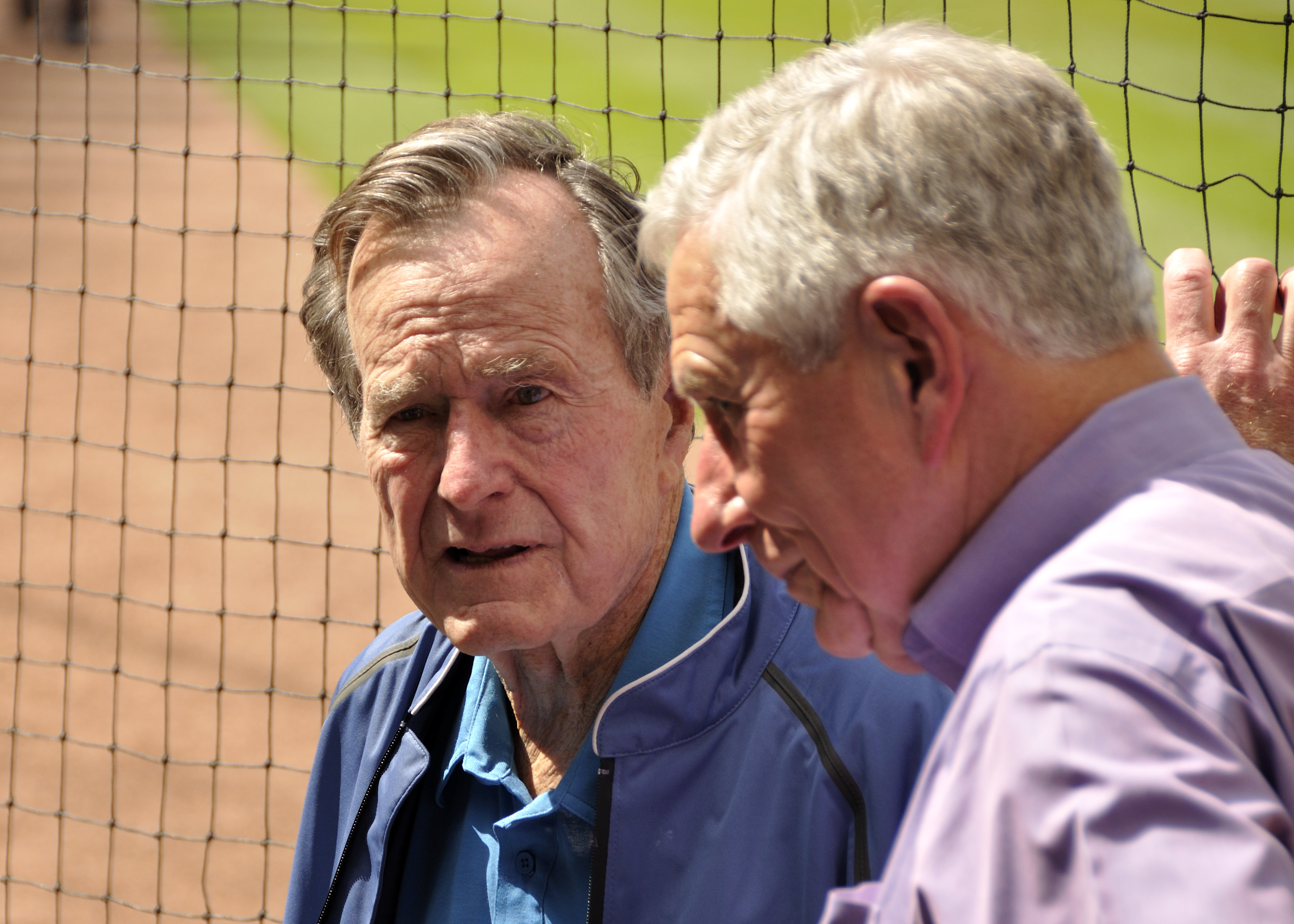
- George H. W. Bush (left) and McLane in 2010
- Born: July 22, 1936 (age 90); Cameron, Texas, U.S.
- Education: Baylor University; Michigan State University
- Occupations: Chairman, McLane Company
- Spouse: Elizabeth
- Children: 2
- Website: draytonmclanejr.com

Drayton McLane Jr. (born July 22, 1936) is an American billionaire businessman. He is chairman of the McLane Group, a holding company with a portfolio of various diverse enterprises. He was, until 1990, the CEO of the McLane Company, a grocery and food service warehouse, supply, and logistics firm, and was, from 1993 until 2011, the chairman and CEO of Major League Baseball's Houston Astros. As of July 2026, his net worth was estimated at US$4.4 billion.

== Personal history ==
He was born on July 22, 1936, in Cameron, Texas. His father, Drayton McLane Sr., owned a wholesale grocery distribution center that had been established by his grandfather, Robert McLane, in 1894. His grandfather came from Abbeville, South Carolina, to Cameron, Texas, in the late 1800s and worked as a farm laborer until about 1885, when he was able to buy and build a small retail grocery, and in 1894 went into the wholesale grocery business in a small way. At age nine, Drayton went to work for his father's business. McLane spent most Saturdays and summers during his teenage years sweeping floors and learning various aspects of the wholesale grocery business. He graduated from C. H. Yoe High School in Cameron in 1954.

He earned his undergraduate degree at Baylor University in 1958 and his master of business administration degree in marketing at Michigan State University in 1959. After graduation, McLane returned home to work for his father. For the first 18 months, he worked the second (night) shift loading trucks. Three years later, he moved into management as vice president of purchasing. He then served 14 years as general manager of operations. He became president and CEO of McLane Company in 1978 and chairman in 1992.

During his years with the company, McLane assisted his father in building an effective grocery distribution network that served convenience stores, supermarkets, and the fast-food industry nationwide. He used computer-based technology to enhance the distribution system. He was largely responsible for expanding the family business from a $3 million-a-year operation into a $19 billion enterprise.

As president and CEO of McLane Company from 1965 to 1994, he added 16 distribution facilities across the US. During that time, the company experienced an average yearly sales growth of 30 percent. During those years, McLane served as president of the Texas Wholesale Grocers Association (1970–1971) and chairman of the National American Wholesale Grocers Association (1986–1988).

He sold the family business to tennis partner Sam Walton for cash and Wal-Mart shares in 1990. He invested much of the profits in professional baseball's Houston Astros. He continued as chairman of McLane Co. and was named vice chairman of Wal-Mart Corporation. In 1993, he resigned from both of these positions to devote his full-time as chairman of McLane Group, which is a holding company founded in 1992.

== Baseball ownership ==
On July 24, 1992, it was announced that McLane had come to an agreement with John McMullen to purchase the team, which also included the lease on the Astrodome for a total of $117 million; approval by the league owners followed in the fall.

In his first season as owner in 1993, the Astros went 85–77, with the free-agent acquisitions of Doug Drabek and Greg Swindell (each signed to four-year deals) making minimal contributions. After the season, he fired Bill Wood and Art Howe on October 5 and replaced them with Bob Watson (promoted from assistant GM) and Terry Collins; Watson was the second African American general manager in Major League Baseball (first since Bill Lucas in the 1970s), and he served at the position until 1995, when he left to be the GM of the New York Yankees. McLane and Tal Smith searched for a GM and came up with Gerry Hunsicker, hired in November 1995.

The Astros had to rely on creativity to cultivate a club worthy of contention, as their minor-league system provided virtually nothing from 1986 to 1996, and McLane claimed to have lost $65 million by 1995 to the point where he implored the business community and fans to increase the season ticket base by at least 12,000 in the guise of being able to remain competitive, and rumors surfaced about the team possibly moving to Northern Virginia. McLane, who had balked at the idea of building a new stadium by the County that wanted over $200 million contributed by the Astros, had approached Bill Collins about a backup plan to sell the team to him for $150 million if the Harris County stadium referendum failed, which McLane apparently felt was going to not pass. However, the referendum passed by 16,000 votes, which eventually led to the construction of Daikin Park. The 1995 team had a payroll of $32 million and finished one game off making the National League Wild Card. A swoon late in the 1996 season had McLane see enough of Collins as manager, replacing him with broadcaster Larry Dierker. The 1997 team, built on a payroll of $33 million that ranked 19th in the majors, finally broke through. The team went 84–78 and won the National League Central division title, their first title since 1986. Dierker would lead the Astros to the postseason three more times over the next four seasons before Dierker was essentially pushed out by McLane and Hunsicker.

The 2003 offseason brought the arrival of Roger Clemens and Andy Pettitte, each of whom played for three seasons, while longtime reliever Billy Wagner was traded to the Philadelphia Phillies reportedly due to his harsh comments about McLane. A disappointing .500 record at the All-Star break, combined with jeers of manager Jimy Williams when announced as a coach of the 2004 All-Star Game held in Houston, led to him being fired one day later for Phil Garner. A midseason trade for Carlos Beltran helped the team arise from the muck, as the team won 36 of their last 46 games to reach the Wild Card. The team won their first postseason series in the 2004 National League Division Series and fell one game short of the World Series. At the end of the season, longtime general manager Hunsicker resigned. Reportedly, he resigned due to being tired of McLane's influences on team management, where at one point McLane was believed to be jealous of Hunsicker getting credit for the success of the team, and Hunsicker even interviewed for the New York Mets job in 2003. Tim Purpura was named the new general manager for 2005. In the nine years with Hunsicker as GM, the Astros won 54% of their games.

Until 2017, the 2005 Houston Astros season was the most successful season on the field for the Houston franchise. The team won the National League pennant to advance to the World Series, and Houston hosted the first World Series game ever played in Texas. However, the Astros, who had rallied from a losing record earlier in the season, were swept by the Chicago White Sox in four games, granting the White Sox their first championship in 88 years. It was the last postseason run for the Astros, who fell into a decade-long drought that saw just two winning seasons from 2006 to 2014, owing to an aging team that lacked a suitable farm system, as done due to McLane and others pushing for goals of a World Series with a favor for free agents that left the team cratering after 2008.

McLane was approached after the end of the 2008 season about selling the team, and he nearly sold to Jim Crane. However, Crane backed out at the last minute before a handshake deal could be done. Crane made bids to buy a team in both 2009 (for the Chicago Cubs) and 2010 (for the Texas Rangers), but neither effort succeeded, with the latter bid reportedly being rejected due to the influence of McLane despite reportedly being a better deal than the accepted one.

McLane announced on November 21, 2010, that the Astros franchise was for sale again. A recent regional television deal with Comcast SportsNet Houston was stated by McLane as putting the Astros on a similar footing as other National League teams, and McLane believed it would help with the income side of this transaction. McLane said the sale was for "family" reasons, and he was joined in the announcement by his two adult sons, Drayton III and Denton. The Astros finished the 2011 season with 106 losses under McLane in his final season as owner, the first occasion the team had lost 100 games in franchise history. The team was sold on November 17, 2011, for $680 million.

Two years after the sale, McLane was sued by the purchaser, Jim Crane, for breach of contract, fraud, negligent misrepresentation or omission, and civil conspiracy, stemming from claims that McLane misrepresented the value of the team's TV broadcast rights. McLane countersued, accusing the Astros of deliberately tanking in 2012 and 2013 (where they lost 218 combined games) to sink the network. In 2021, attempts by McLane within Comcast (long since defunct) to dismiss the lawsuit were denied. In 2023, the Texas Supreme Court ruled that Crane could go forward with his lawsuit, which had previously been ruled favorably for Crane by a Houston district court in 2019 and the 14th Court of Appeals in 2021.

In nineteen seasons as owner, the Astros had a winning record in fourteen of them while reaching the postseason six times and overseeing the team move into a new stadium with Daikin Park in 2000. Under his management, McLane hired four general managers (the longest being Gerry Hunsicker) and six managers, with McLane being described as having a special interest in running the team like a business under close watch. This worked to both success and detriment with a variety of free agent pushes with moderate payroll that saw players such as Darryl Kile, Randy Johnson, Beltran, and Mike Hampton leave for more money while paying for veterans such as Roger Clemens, Andy Pettitte, and Carlos Lee and Woody Williams. McLane made moves without consulting his general managers at times, such as when Ken Caminiti wanted to return to Houston in 2000 or when he exercised Craig Biggio's contract in 2005. Norm Miller, a player-turned-front office man, recounted how McLane approached him about signing a document about pledging to perform with the highest of Christian principles (Miller left a year later). In nineteen seasons as owner, the team won 1,556 games while losing 1,456. He left as the longest serving owner of the Astros.

== McLane Group ==
McLane devotes his time to McLane Group, the family holding company for these corporations:

- Sports in Action
- Dave Campbell's Texas Football
- McLane Intelligent Solutions
- McLane Technology Partners
- McLane Global
- McLane Classic Foods
- McLane Ranch, L.P.
- RDM Commerce, Inc.

Former McLane Group entities:

- McLane Polska
- McLane Portugal
- McLane Cattle, LLC
- Leading Edge Flavors
- McLane International
- McLane Advanced Technologies

== Volunteer activities ==
McLane and his wife, Elizabeth, have two adult sons, Drayton III, and Denton. They were active members of First Baptist Church of Temple, where Drayton taught Sunday School and served as an active deacon. Currently, they are active members of First Baptist Belton.

By the spring of 2009, the McLane family had brought "new life" to Michigan State University's baseball facility through a $4 million commitment to enhance one of the most pristine environments in all of intercollegiate athletics. On September 12, 2008, MSU's board of trustees voted unanimously to approve the naming of Drayton McLane Baseball Stadium at John H. Kobs Field.

McLane puts aside a large amount of time to serve on civic and charitable committees. Drayton Jr. currently serves as: chairman of Texas Central Partners High Speed Rail; vice president at large, Boy Scouts of America National Board; member of the board of trustees of Baylor Scott and White Healthcare; member of the national board of governors for Cooper Institute of Aerobics Research; board director of the Bush School of Government and Public Service at Texas A&M University; member of the board of trustees, Baylor College of Medicine; board of visitors, the University Cancer Foundation MD Anderson; board director, Happy State Bank, member of United Way of Central Texas.

His past civic duties include: chairman of the board of trustees of Baylor Scott and White Healthcare; chairman of Scott and White Healthcare's board of trustees; VP of the executive board of Boy Scouts of America; chairman of United Way of the Texas Gulf Coast's Pacesetter Campaign; member—Children's Miracle Network's national board of governors; chairman of the board—Children's Miracle Network; member—Texas State Board of Mental Health and Mental Retardation; chairman of the board of trustees—Baylor University; chairman of the board of regents of Baylor University; member of the Greater Houston Partnership; chairman of Temple (Texas) Chamber of Commerce; and trustee—South Texas College of Law. In the religious community of Temple, Texas, he has served as the chairman of the deacon board of First Baptist Church.

He is a major benefactor of both Baylor University, where the McLane Student Life Center, the acclaimed McLane carillons, and McLane Stadium are named in his honor, and the University of Mary Hardin-Baylor (UMHB) in Belton, Texas, where McLane Hall honors him. He sponsors the McLane Lectures at UMHB, bringing to campus such notables as former President George H. W. Bush, Honorable Sean O'Keefe (former NASA administrator and current chancellor of Louisiana State University), and Barbara Bush, the former first lady of the US.

In 2005, Scott and White Memorial Hospital in Temple honored Drayton and his wife by creating the Elizabeth and Drayton McLane Jr. Chair in Health and Wellness, a new endowed chair that is a joint appointment between the hospital and the Texas A&M University Health Science Center College of Medicine.

In April 2020, Governor Greg Abbott named McLane to the Strike Force to Open Texas – a group "tasked with finding safe and effective ways to slowly reopen the state" amid the COVID-19 pandemic.

== Political activity ==
McLane contributed $61,200 to Donald Trump's 2020 presidential campaign.

== McLane Stadium ==
Baylor University announced in December 2013 that it would name its new football stadium McLane Stadium after "one of the most distinguished and generous alumni families in Baylor University history."

Michigan State University named its baseball stadium, McLane Stadium, after him.

== Honors and awards ==
- 1997 Golden Plate Award: American Academy of Achievement
