= Grady Hatton =

American baseball player and manager (1922–2013)

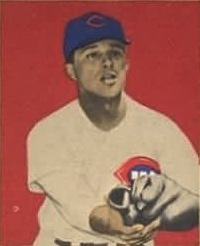
- Hatton's 1949 Bowman Gum baseball card
- Third baseman / Manager
- Born: October 7, 1922; Beaumont, Texas, U.S.
- Died: April 11, 2013 (aged 90); Warren, Texas, U.S.
- Batted: Left Threw: Right

MLB debut
- April 16, 1946, for the Cincinnati Reds

Last MLB appearance
- October 1, 1960, for the Chicago Cubs

MLB statistics
- Batting average: .254
- Home runs: 91
- Runs batted in: 533
- Managerial record: 164–221
- Winning %: .426
- Stats at Baseball Reference
- Managerial record at Baseball Reference

Teams
- As player: Cincinnati Reds / Redlegs (1946–1954); Chicago White Sox (1954); Boston Red Sox (1954–1956); St. Louis Cardinals (1956); Baltimore Orioles (1956); Chicago Cubs (1960); As manager: Houston Astros (1966–1968)

Career highlights and awards
- All-Star (1952)

Grady Edgebert Hatton Jr. (October 7, 1922 – April 11, 2013) was an American professional baseball second baseman, third baseman, coach and manager. He played in Major League Baseball for the Cincinnati Reds / Redlegs, Chicago White Sox, Boston Red Sox, St. Louis Cardinals, Baltimore Orioles and Chicago Cubs. Hatton is most identified with his native Texas: he was born in Beaumont, attended the University of Texas at Austin, managed minor league teams in Houston and San Antonio, and was an important contributor to the early years of Major League Baseball's Houston Astros.

== Playing career ==
Hatton batted left-handed and threw right-handed, standing 5 ft 8 in (1.73 m) and weighing 170 lb (77 kg). He came to the Majors in 1946 without any minor league seasoning after serving in the United States Army Air Forces during World War II. Hatton made his MLB debut against the Chicago Cubs on April 16, going three for five with two runs batted in in a 4–3 loss. Hatton would bat .254 with 91 home runs and 1,068 hits over his 12-year big league career in 1,312 games played.

Hatton appeared in 116 games in 1946, the first of his six consecutive seasons as Cincinnati's regular third baseman. In 1952, Hatton moved to second base and was selected to the National League All-Star team, although he did not play in the July 8 game at Shibe Park (and hit only .212 for the season).

However, in 1954, Hatton's tenure in Cincinnati came to an abrupt end, as he appeared in only one game for the Redlegs before being traded to the Chicago White Sox on April 18. The ChiSox in turn sent him to the Boston Red Sox five weeks later—swapping him and cash for eventual Hall of Fame third baseman George Kell. Hatton was Boston's regular third baseman in 1954–55, then spent 1956 in a utility role for the Red Sox, St. Louis Cardinals and Baltimore Orioles. In 1957 he finally played in the minor leagues, for the San Francisco Seals of the Pacific Coast League.

== Managerial career ==
From 1958–60, Hatton was the player-manager of the Double-A San Antonio Missions (and briefly served as a playing coach for the 1960 Cubs). He started the 1961 campaign as manager of the Triple-A Houston Buffs, but he resigned early in the season to become the director of player personnel for the expansion Houston Colt .45s of the National League, set to begin play in 1962. He moved back into uniform as manager of Houston's Triple-A Oklahoma City 89ers farm in the Pacific Coast League from 1963–65 and was named minor league manager of the year for 1965 by The Sporting News.

Hatton succeeded Luman Harris as the (renamed) Astros' manager for 1966, while also carrying the additional title of club vice president and sharing general manager duties with Spec Richardson and Tal Smith. It was expected that Hatton would be able to harness the young talent he had developed at Triple-A. But the three-headed general manager experiment ended after 1966, with Richardson assuming sole GM duties, and Hatton's Astros compiled a record of only 164–221 (.426) in 2 1/2 years. He was replaced as skipper by Harry Walker midway through the 1968 campaign, on June 17. At the time, Houston was 23–38 and tenth and last in the National League.

== Post-managerial and coaching career ==
Hatton remained with the Astros as a scout from 1968–72, and as a Major League coach in 1973–74. He was still active in baseball in the late 1980s as a scout for the San Francisco Giants.

Hatton died from natural causes on April 11, 2013. He was 90.
