= Ed Wade =

American baseball executive (born 1956)

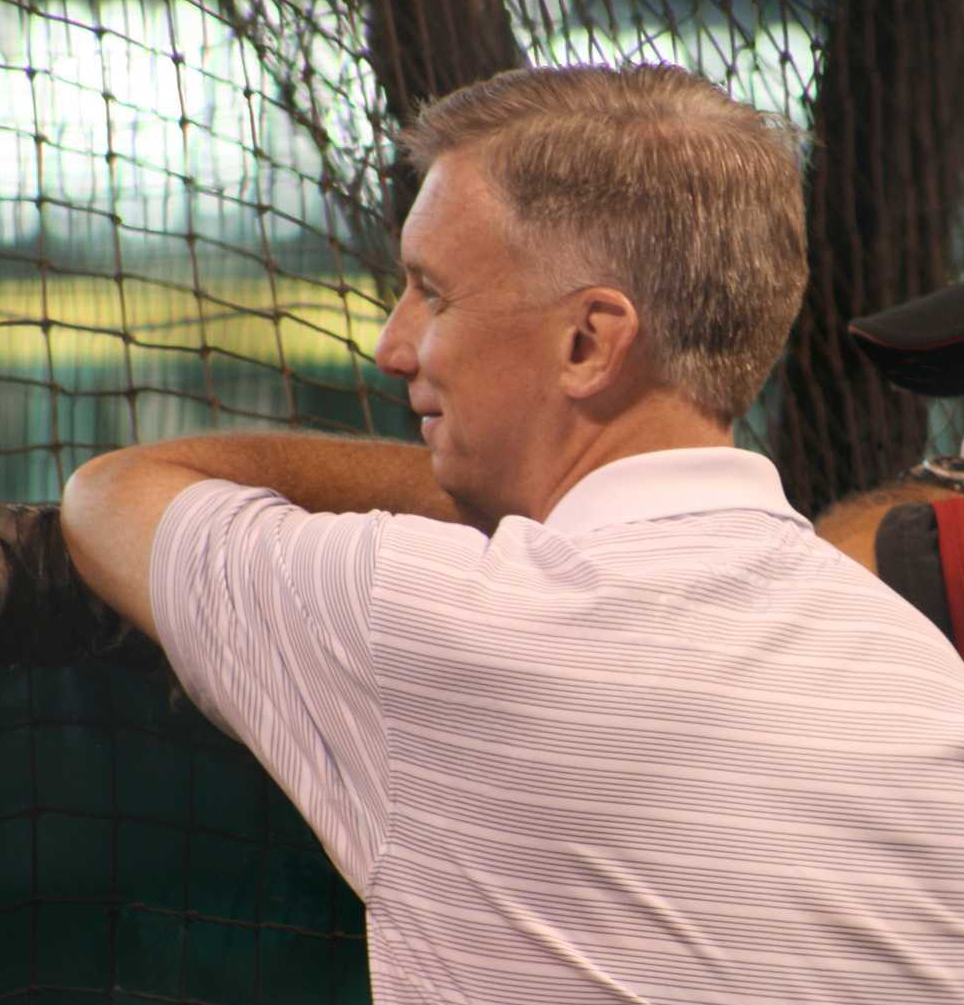
- Wade in 2008
- General manager
- Born: January 31, 1956 (age 70); Carbondale, Pennsylvania, U.S.

Teams
- Philadelphia Phillies (1998–2005); Houston Astros (2007–2011)

Career highlights and awards
- Philadelphia Phillies Wall of Fame

Ed Wade (born January 31, 1956) is an American former Major League Baseball executive, who worked 42 years in MLB, including serving as vice president and general manager of the Philadelphia Phillies from 1998 to 2005 and general manager of the Houston Astros from 2007 to 2011. Wade rejoined the Phillies as a special consultant in 2011 until 2018.

== Early life and career in baseball ==
A 1973 graduate of St. Rose High School in Carbondale, Wade enrolled at Temple University and graduated in 1977 with a journalism degree. He played baseball for the Temple Owls his first two and half years of college, before ending his playing career to focus on his goal of becoming a sportswriter. While a student, Wade served internships with the Scranton (PA) Times, Williamsport (PA) Sun-Gazette, the Philadelphia Bulletin, and the Philadelphia Bureau of the Associated Press. On February 1, 1977, the day after his 21st birthday, Wade began his Major League baseball career when he accepted an internship in the Philadelphia Phillies’ Public Relations department.

In October 1977, Wade landed his first full-time job when he was hired as a public relations assistant for the Houston Astros and was promoted to Public Relations Director in 1979. Wade was the PR Director of the Astros in 1980 when Houston lost the dramatic five-game National League Championship Series to his former Phillies team which went on to win the World Series against the Kansas City Royals.

While serving as the Astros PR Director, Wade asked J. R. Richard if the Astros All Star pitcher could hold eight baseballs in one hand after Cincinnati Reds catcher Johnny Bench held seven baseballs in one hand. Richard agreed and posed for what became an iconic photo of Richard.

In May 1981, Wade left Houston to become the Public Relations Director for the Pittsburgh Pirates and remained with that club for five seasons.

In 1986, Wade returned to Houston to work as an associate for Tal Smith Enterprises, a firm run by Tal Smith, who had served as president and general manager of the Astros while Wade was the club's PR Director. Tal Smith Enterprises provided consulting services to 26 of the 30 MLB clubs, with the most recognized functions being in preparation of arbitration cases, the financial appraisal of a franchise, contract negotiations, and other baseball-related matters.

Wade worked for the company until May 5, 1989, when he rejoined the Phillies as assistant to the general manager under GM Lee Thomas. In 1995, he was promoted to assistant general manager.

At the Baseball Winter Meetings in 1989, Wade recommended to Thomas that the Phillies select third baseman Dave Hollins from the San Diego Padres in the Rule 5 Draft. Hollins went on to become the Phillies everyday third baseman from 1990 to 1995, appearing in 550 regular season games, and was the Phils' third baseman in 1993 when the club defeated the Atlanta Braves in the National League Championship Series before losing to the Toronto Blue Jays in the 1993 World Series.

At the Major League Expansion Draft in November 1997, Wade played a major role in GM Lee Thomas' acquisition of future All Star outfielder Bobby Abreu; Abreu had been left unprotected by the Houston Astros in the Expansion Draft and was selected by the expansion Tampa Bay Devil Rays, who then traded Abreu to the Phillies for shortstop Kevin Stocker.

== Work as the Phillies GM ==
Wade was named as the Phillies interim general manager in December 1997, succeeding Thomas. Wade was promoted to vice president and general manager in the spring of 1998.

Led by Wade, the Phillies went through a major rebuild, adopting the pledge to "Get good and stay good." The team shed veteran players and opened opportunities for a younger core nucleus. Led by Scouting Directors Mike Arbuckle and Marti Wolever, the Phillies drafted and signed Brett Myers, Pat Burrell, future National League MVP Ryan Howard, Chase Utley, 2008 World Series MVP Cole Hamels and Ryan Madson. Wade also promoted future N.L. MVP shortstop Jimmy Rollins from Triple A Scranton to the Major Leagues. The team also made an impactful international move in 2000 when it signed Panamanian catcher Carlos Ruiz. Wade also selected outfielder Shane Victorino from the Los Angeles Dodgers in the 2004 Rule 5 Draft; Victorino would go on to star on World Series championship clubs in Philadelphia and Boston.

Wade was also responsible for the trades of pitcher Curt Schilling and future Hall of Fame third baseman Scott Rolen. On July 26, 2000, Wade traded Schilling to the Arizona Diamondbacks after Schilling's frequent criticism of the Phillies lack of spending. In July 2002, Wade traded Rolen to the St. Louis Cardinals after Rolen rejected a 10-year, $140 million contract extension while questioning the team's low payroll (at the time, the Phillies ranked in the bottom third of salaries in Major League Baseball) and commitment to winning.

During this period, Wade and the Phillies promised their fans and players that their economic commitment would improve when they completed the move from Veterans Stadium to Citizens Bank Park. On December 6, 2002, more than a year prior to the move to Citizens Bank Park, the Phillies signed free agent first baseman Jim Thome to a six-year, $85 million contract, fulfilling the team's promise to its fans that spending would increase. While still committed to building a core nucleus from within, the Phillies continued to acquire other veteran players under Wade's watch, including David Bell, Billy Wagner, Kevin Millwood, Jon Lieber, Eric Milton and Kenny Lofton.

Prior to the 2004 season, Wade hired Charlie Manuel as manager, replacing Larry Bowa. Manuel went on to lead the Phillies to a World Series Championship in 2008, defeating the Tampa Bay Rays in five games. It was only the second World Series Championship in Phillies history, the other occurring in 1980 when they defeated the Kansas City Royals.

After missing the 2005 playoffs by a one-game margin, Wade was dismissed and replaced by future Hall of Fame executive Pat Gillick. In Wade's eight seasons as VP/GM, the Phillies compiled a record of 643-652 (.497). However, in his final five seasons, the team went 426–383 (.527), the sixth-best record in the National League in that span.

In the six years (2006–2011) immediately following Wade's dismissal, the Phillies, with mostly the core players drafted and developed during his tenure, posted a record of 558-414 (.555) and finished in first place in the National League East for five consecutive seasons (2007–2011). And, in 2008, the Phillies won their first World Series championship in 28 years. Gillick, Wade's successor, referred to the 2008 Champions as “Ed Wade’s team” during the post-victory celebration. The Phillies again went to the World Series in 2009, losing to the New York Yankees. From 2001 thru 2011, the Phillies put together a record of 984-797 (.555) with only one sub-.500 season (80–81 in 2002).

== Houston Astros ==
Following two seasons of pro scouting for the San Diego Padres, Wade was hired on September 20, 2007, by Houston Astros owner Drayton McLane, as the Astros' general manager, reuniting him with Tal Smith, who was then serving as Astros' president.

In his four years as the Astros GM, Wade again went through another rebuild, which saw him trade stars including Lance Berkman, Brad Lidge, Roy Oswalt, and Hunter Pence for prospects. The 2008 team finished 86–75, the only winning season in Wade's tenure. The 2011 team lost 106 games, a franchise record.

Early in the 2011 season, Wade promoted future American League MVP second baseman Jose Altuve (signed by the Astros in early 2007) directly from Double-A Corpus Christi to the major leagues, and Altuve immediately established himself as a star. Among the major league players drafted by the Astros during Wade's tenure were 2015 Cy Young Award winner Dallas Keuchel, 2017 World Series MVP outfielder George Springer, and J.D. Martinez, a six-time All-Star and a three-time Silver Slugger winner. Altuve, Keuchel, and Springer were key players in the franchise's first World Series championship in 2017.

Following the 2011 season, McLane sold the Astros to Jim Crane. The sale of the team was approved by MLB owners on November 26, 2011, and Wade was dismissed two days later. At the time of Wade's dismissal, there were 41 players in the Astros organization who went on to play in the Major Leagues, including Altuve, Keuchel, Springer, Martinez, J.A. Happ, Kiké Hernández, and Mark Melancon.

== Return to Philadelphia Phillies ==
Wade returned to the Phillies in December 2011 as a professional scout and special consultant to General Manager Ruben Amaro Jr., who Wade had hired as his assistant GM while he served as the Phillies GM. Wade remained with the Phillies until his retirement after the 2017 season.

== Post-retirement ==
Following his retirement from MLB, Wade wrote two novels, which he self-published via Amazon. In 2012, Wade published Delayed Honor. He added a paperback version in 2024. Also in 2024, Wade wrote a sequel, Preserved Honor, also available on Amazon. Both books are action/thrillers and are set in a fictional town in Northeastern Pennsylvania. Wade also earned his Class "A" skydiving license, having been taught how to skydive by SEAL Nix White and other members of the Leap Frogs, the Navy SEALs parachute team. Wade finished his skydiving endeavors with 43 jumps. A runner, Wade has finished the Marine Corp Marathon twice and the Houston Marathon once. Wade and his wife Roxanne live in Sewell, New Jersey. They have three children and four grandchildren.

On August 1, 2025, Wade was inducted into the Phillies Wall of Fame.

Sporting positions
Preceded by Lee Thomas	Philadelphia Phillies General Manager; 1998–2005	Succeeded by Pat Gillick
Preceded by Tal Smith	Houston Astros General Manager; 2007–2011	Succeeded by Jeff Luhnow
