= George Postolos =

- Born: December 6, 1963 (age 62)
- Education: Harvard University (B.A., Political Theory, 1986); Harvard Law School (J.D., 1990)
- Occupation: Business executive
- Employer: Postolos Group LP
- Known for: President of the Houston Rockets and Houston Astros; founder of Postolos Group LP
- Title: President and CEO, Postolos Group LP

George Postolos (born December 6, 1963) is the president and CEO of the Postolos Group LP, a firm that focuses on advising in sports acquisitions of major league franchises. He was formerly the president of the Houston Rockets and Houston Astros.

== Early life ==
Postolos graduated magna cum laude both from Harvard University with a degree in political theory in 1986, and from Harvard Law School in 1990.

== Career ==
Postolos specialized in mergers and acquisitions for the New York law firm Wachtell, Lipton, Rosen & Katz before becoming the personal assistant to then-NBA commissioner David Stern. He was hired as the Houston Rockets' chief operating officer in 1998, at 34 years old. During his time with the Rockets, Postolos played a large role in winning the arena referendum to build Toyota Center in downtown Houston. In 2006, Postolos resigned as president and CEO of the Rockets and started the Postolos Group, LP, an investment and advisory firm that specializes in the sports and live-entertainment business. Postolos became president of the Astros on November 27, 2011, following the sale of the team to Jim Crane. He replaced Tal Smith. He resigned as president and CEO on May 13, 2013, and was later replaced by Reid Ryan.
