= John J. McMullen & Associates =

U.S. naval architecture firm

John J. McMullen Associates, Incorporated (JJMA) was a naval architecture firm in the United States, specializing in ship design and marine-related technical consulting between 1957 and 2005. Founded in 1957 in New York City by Dr. John J. McMullen, JJMA developed a strong reputation in commercial ship design and management of ship construction projects for ship operators.

In the 1970s, JJMA extended its capabilities to technical and program support of US Navy ship construction programs for the Naval Sea Systems Command (NAVSEA) through an office in Arlington, Virginia. Success in naval programs support led to them as l further expansion with JJMA operations supporting NAVSEA in Pascagoula, Mississippi, Bath, Maine, Port Hueneme, California, Newport News, Virginia and several other U.S. shipbuilding centers. JJMA also added a Houston, Texas operation to support the offshore oil industry, as well as specialty consulting services in New York for port planning, and support for naval modernization by allied nations. By 1982, JJMA had approximately 300 employees.

By the mid-1980s, JJMA was active in naval combat systems installation integration and was a key member of the NAVSEA Iowa-class Battleship Modernization Program. A corporate headquarters building was acquired in Alexandria, Virginia. In 1988, JJMA was acquired by Talley Industries of Phoenix, Arizona, who continued to operate JJMA as a separate unit. At this point, JJMA had grown to seven hundred employees; mostly engineers and skilled designers. In 1998, when parent Talley Industries was acquired by Carpenter Steel, JJMA employees made an offer to purchase the company and JJMA became 100% employee-owned firm organized as an employee stock ownership plan.

JJMA was one of the original tenants of the World Trade Center towers, and maintained offices in the WTC until the infamous 9/11 terrorist attack in 2001. JJMA offices in WTC 2 were evacuated safely and no JJMA personnel were injured in the event.

In 2005, JJMA was purchased by McLean, Virginia-based Alion Science and Technology Corporation, another ESOP company with broad participation in Department of Defense programs and was designated their JJMA Maritime Sector or JMS; retiring the JJMA identity that was in the maritime industry for almost fifty years.

In 2019, the Naval Systems Business Unit was sold to Serco, a British provider of public service. Serco re-branded the division Maritime, Engineering, Technology and Sustainment (METS).
