= Tim Purpura =

American baseball executive and lawyer (born 1958)

- Born: Timothy Gerard Purpura; March 19, 1958 (age 68); Oak Lawn, Illinois, U.S.
- Education: Loyola University Chicago (B.S.); Thomas Jefferson School of Law (J.D.)
- Occupation: Baseball Executive
- Spouse: Shari

Timothy Gerard Purpura (born March 19, 1958) is an American baseball executive and former lawyer. He is the former general manager of the Houston Astros Major League Baseball team. He was with the club from 2005 to 2007.

== Biography ==
He graduated from Oak Lawn Community High School in Illinois in 1976.

Purpura received a Bachelor of Science degree in Psychology from Loyola University of Chicago in 1983 and earned a Juris Doctor degree from the Thomas Jefferson School of Law in 1991. He was inducted into the Oak Lawn Community High School (Illinois) Hall of Fame in November 2005.

He worked as an assistant in player development for the California Angels during spring training from 1990 to 1992 and headed special projects for the San Diego Padres minor league department in 1991. When he started working for the Angels, he was also attending law school. He had also worked as an assistant resident dean of students at Revelle College UC San Diego.

Purpura was the Houston Astros assistant farm director in 1994 and the director of major and minor league player relations from 1995 to 1996. He was the assistant GM and director of player development from 1997 to 2004 and was named general manager of the Astros on November 1, 2004, replacing Gerry Hunsicker.

Under his tenure, the club made its first World Series appearance (against the Chicago White Sox) in 2005. It proved to be the highlight of his career as general manager. Trades to try and keep the Astros window open a bit longer with the twilight of the careers of Jeff Bagwell and Craig Biggio brought the arrival of Carlos Lee in 2007 on a six-year $100 million deal (backloaded to pay more money in the last years). While Lee did have decent offensive numbers with the Astros in five seasons, the Astros could not stop the inevitable plunge; Andy Pettite and Roger Clemens each departed after the 2006 season. Acquisitions by Purpura such as Preston Wilson (signed in 2006 to provide a bat before being released in August), Woody Williams, and Jason Jennings (as done by dealing Willy Taveras) did not pan out.

With the Astros at 58–73, owner Drayton McLane fired Purpura and manager Phil Garner on August 27, 2007. Ed Wade replaced Purpura as GM on September 20.

He was later executive vice president and chief operating office of Minor League Baseball (2008–2011), the Texas Rangers senior director of player development (2011–2013), and adjunct professor in Southern Methodist University's Graduate School of Sports Management (2014–2015). In September 2016, he was named president of the Texas League.

Purpura, his wife, Shari, daughter Brooke, and son Brennan, live in Bellaire, Texas.

Preceded by Gerry Hunsicker	Houston Astros General Manager; 2005 to 2007	Succeeded by Tal Smith
