= Reid Ryan =

American baseball player and executive

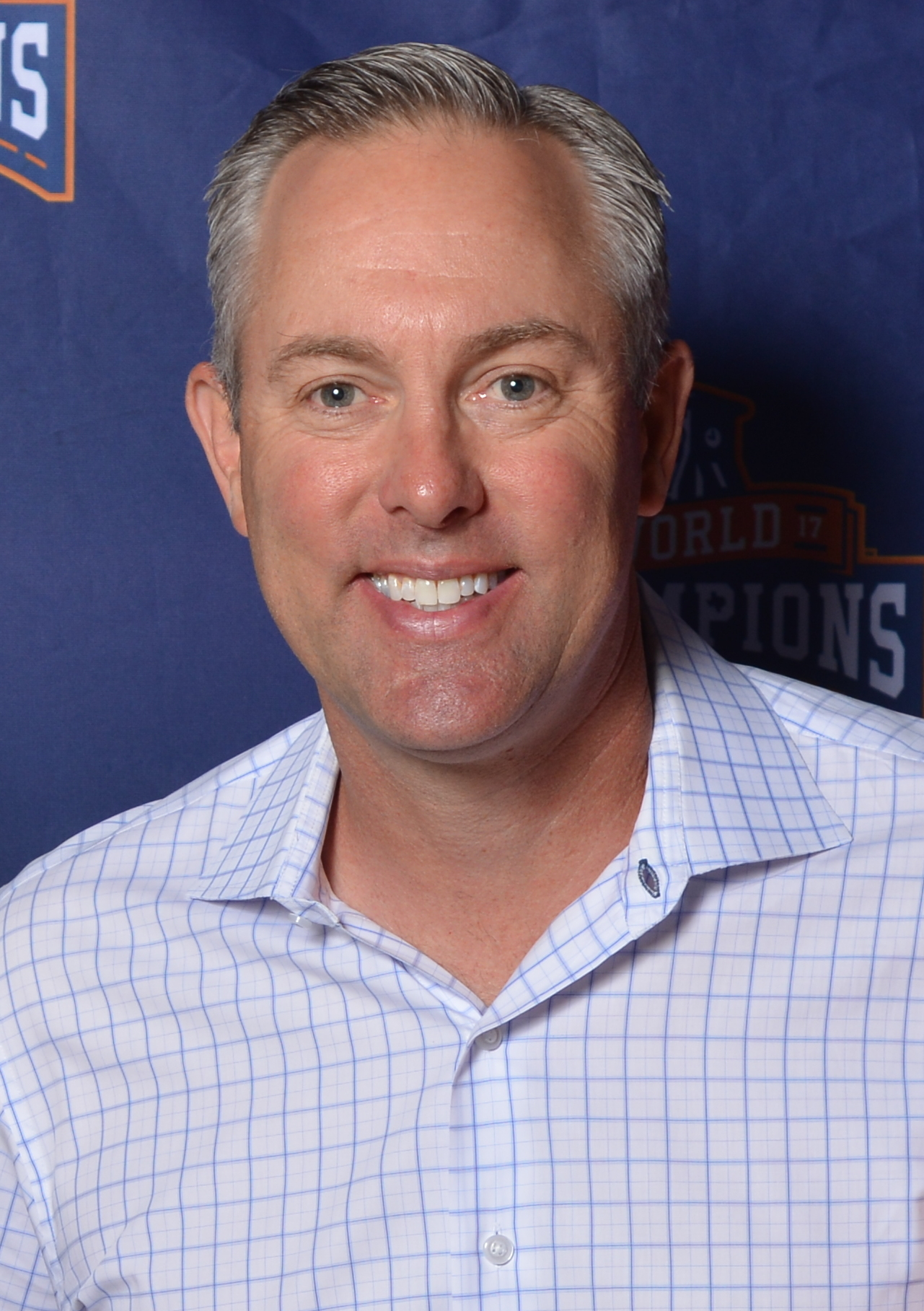
- Ryan in 2018
- Pitcher
- Born: November 21, 1971 (age 54); Alvin, Texas, U.S.
- Bats: Right Throws: Right
- Stats at Baseball Reference

Reid Ryan (born November 21, 1971) is an American baseball executive, former college and professional baseball player, and son of Baseball Hall of Fame pitcher Nolan Ryan. He was a pitcher in minor league baseball, and is the CEO of Ryan-Sanders Baseball Inc., which owns the Round Rock Express. He was president of the Houston Astros from May 2013 to November 2019.

== Early life ==
Ryan grew up in Alvin, Texas, outside of Houston, and attended Alvin High School.

== College career ==
Ryan attended the University of Texas at Austin, beginning his college baseball career with the Texas Longhorns. He transferred to Texas Christian University and finished his collegiate career with the TCU Horned Frogs.

== Professional career ==
=== Draft and minor leagues ===
The Texas Rangers, his father's team at the time, selected him in the 17th round (477th overall) of the 1994 Major League Baseball draft. He pitched for the Class A Short Season Hudson Valley Renegades in 1994, putting together a 5-5 record with a 2.89 earned run average (ERA) and 1.30 walks plus hits per inning pitched (WHIP) in 84 innings. He split 1995 between the Class A Charleston RiverDogs and Class A Advanced Visalia Oaks, combining for an 0-10 record with a 9.34 ERA and 2.29 WHIP.

== Post-playing career ==
Along with his father, his brother Reese, and former Astros part-owner Don Sanders, Ryan is the CEO and president of Ryan-Sanders Baseball, Inc., a group that owns the Round Rock Express of the Class AAA Pacific Coast League. He is on the board of trustees for Major League Baseball.

On May 16, 2013, the Astros announced hiring Ryan as their president, following the resignation of George Postolos. The Astros won the 2017 World Series and won the 2019 American League pennant. Reid Ryan was demoted by the Astros after the 2019 World Series when Houston Astros sign stealing scandal came to light. He returned as CEO of Ryan-Sanders in 2020.

Reid was the executive producer of the "Facing Nolan" documentary.

== Personal life ==
Ryan and his wife, Nicole, have three children, including a son who has cerebral palsy.
