= Spec Richardson =

American professional baseball executive

- Born: Harold Beland Richardson; October 27, 1922; Harris County, Georgia, U.S.
- Died: April 12, 2016 (aged 93); Columbus, Georgia, U.S.
- Occupation: Baseball executive

Harold Beland "Spec" Richardson (October 27, 1922 – April 12, 2016) was an American professional baseball executive. He served as the general manager of two Major League Baseball teams, the Houston Astros (1967–75) and San Francisco Giants (1976–81).

== Career ==
A native of Columbus, Georgia, Richardson began his baseball career in 1946 as concessions manager of the minor league Columbus Cardinals of the Class A Sally League. He advanced to business manager, and switched to the rival Jacksonville Tars (later the Braves) in 1949, staying with that franchise through 1958. He then served as general manager of the Houston Buffaloes of the Triple-A American Association from 1959–61.

=== Houston Astros ===
When the minor-league Buffaloes were succeeded by the MLB Houston Colt .45s in 1962, Richardson joined the expansion team in its debut National League season as the Colt .45s' business manager. The team was renamed the Astros in 1965.

Richardson took over as Astro general manager after his two predecessors, Paul Richards and Tal Smith, had built one of the most talented farm systems in baseball. In its five-year history, the Houston franchise had produced star players Rusty Staub, Joe Morgan, Jimmy Wynn, Larry Dierker and Dave Giusti, with future standouts Doug Rader and Don Wilson ripening in its minor league system.

But Paul Richards was fired by Astro owner Roy Hofheinz after the 1965 season. Houston spent 1966 with Smith heading up a three-man baseball operations management team that included Richardson and field manager Grady Hatton. Then, during the 1966–67 off-season, Hofheinz named Richardson the club's official general manager, a job he would hold for almost nine full seasons.

Richardson traded 31-year-old Mike Cuellar to the Baltimore Orioles for Curt Blefary on December 4, 1968. Cuellar appeared in three consecutive World Series with the Orioles from 1969 to 1971 including a 1970 Championship run, was a co-recipient of the American League Cy Young Award in 1969, had at least 20 wins in each of four seasons and won 143 games in eight years in Baltimore. Blefary spent only one season with the Astros before being dealt to the New York Yankees for Joe Pepitone.

Richardson then traded Staub — a 24-year-old outfielder and first baseman who displayed remarkable ability to hit for high average and decent power (leading the league in doubles in 1967) within the confines of the cavernous Astrodome — to the Montreal Expos for Jesús Alou and Donn Clendenon. Clendenon refused to report, however, and Montreal instead sent Jack Billingham, Skip Guinn, and cash. The club may have felt that Staub's ankle problems would shorten his career, but Staub instead continued his exceptional hitting in Montreal, Detroit, and New York. John Mayberry – another young first base prospect – was traded to the Kansas City Royals for mediocre bullpen help. There he became an integral part of the Royals.

However, Richardson's most memorable trade featured Morgan, the Astros' star second baseman, who was dealt (along with 4 time gold glove winner César Gerónimo, infielder Denis Menke, utility outfielder Ed Armbrister and starting pitcher Jack Billingham) to the Cincinnati Reds in exchange for first baseman Lee May, second baseman Tommy Helms and utility infielder Jimmy Stewart. Morgan went on to become the offensive heart of the Big Red Machine, who would later win back to back World Series championships in both 1975 and 1976 and is widely held by many to be the greatest second baseman of the second half of the 20th century. He was elected to the Baseball Hall of Fame in 1990.

That trade is generally regarded as being one of the most lopsided in the history of Major League Baseball. After the 1974 season, Lee May would be dealt to Baltimore in exchange for third baseman Enos Cabell.

To his credit, Richardson recognized César Cedeño as a potential superstar, but the Astros spent his tenure and several years after it mired in mediocrity. During Richardson's nine-year stewardship, Houston would post only four .500 or above records (1969; 1972–74). On July 11, 1975, with Houston at 32–58 and lodged in last place in the National League West Division, Richardson was fired and soon replaced by Smith, who returned to the Astros after a stint as an executive with the New York Yankees. Sabermetric research shows that without Richardson's trades, the Astros would likely have been the best team in the National League throughout much of the 1970s. Instead, the team would not appear in the playoffs until 1980.

=== San Francisco Giants ===
Richardson also served as general manager for the San Francisco Giants from December 1975 to July 8, 1981. He joined the Giants on the recommendation of other National League owners during a transitional period, while the team was sold by longtime owner Horace Stoneham, eventually to Bay Area businessman Bob Lurie.

For four of the five full seasons during which Richardson helmed the Giants, the team scuffled on the field, averaging only 74 wins a year. The exception, however, was 1978. Led by slugger Jack Clark and pitchers Vida Blue and Bob Knepper, the 1978 Giants posted an 89–73 record to finish a strong third in the NL West, only six games behind the eventual league champion Los Angeles Dodgers. Richardson was hailed as the Major League Executive of the Year by The Sporting News.

But the Giants returned to mediocrity in 1979. Richardson was demoted from his general manager position on July 7, 1981 and replaced by Tom Haller who had been the team's director of player development. Richardson, then 58, finished his career in a consultants' role with the organization.

== Death ==
He died in Columbus, Georgia at the age of 93 on April 12, 2016.
