= Bill Lucas (baseball) =

American baseball executive

- Born: January 25, 1936; Jacksonville, Florida, U.S.
- Died: May 5, 1979 (aged 43); Atlanta, Georgia, U.S.
- Education: Florida A&M University
- Occupations: Professional baseball player and executive
- Years active: 1957, 1960–1964 player; 1965–1976 front office; 1976–1979 general manager
- Known for: First African-American general manager in MLB history
- Awards: Braves Hall of Fame (2006)

William DeVaughn Lucas (January 25, 1936 – May 5, 1979) was an American professional baseball infielder who became the first African-American general manager in Major League Baseball (MLB) with the Atlanta Braves from mid-September 1976 until his death in early May 1979. A member of the Braves' organization for 23 years, he was inducted into the Ivan Allen Jr. Braves Museum and Hall of Fame in 2006.

== Biography ==
Lucas was born in Jacksonville, Florida. A graduate of Florida A&M University, he signed as an infielder with the Milwaukee Braves in 1957 and played in the Class C California League. He then served two years as an officer in the United States Army. Lucas returned to the Braves' farm system in 1960, reached the Triple-A level with the Denver Bears of the Pacific Coast League in 1963, and finished his minor league career with the Austin Senators of the Double-A Texas League in 1964. Overall, Lucas played professionally for six seasons, batting .273 in 655 games.

Lucas joined the Braves' front office in 1965, working in sales and promotions during the team's relocation to Atlanta before he switched to the player development department in 1967. Lucas was named the director of the Braves' farm system in 1972 and promoted to GM responsibilities on September 17, 1976. At the time, the Braves were in last place in the National League West Division, 30 1/2 games behind the division leader. Owner Ted Turner gave Lucas, whose official title was vice president of player personnel, all the duties of a general manager, while Turner kept the official title himself.

With players like Dale Murphy coming up through Lucas' minor league system, and the selection of Bob Horner as the top pick in the 1978 MLB draft, the Braves began assembling the team that would win the 1982 division title.

The job of rebuilding the Braves was compounded by Turner's tempestuous behavior. On May 11, 1977, the owner appointed himself the Braves' field manager during a losing streak. Turner's dugout reign drew national headlines but lasted only one day before the president of the National League ruled that Turner, as an owner, could not appoint himself manager. Starting in 1978, Lucas found himself caught between Turner and players like rookie Horner and veteran pitcher Phil Niekro, a future Hall of Famer, during contentious contract negotiations.

On the evening of May 1, 1979, with the Braves on the road facing the Pittsburgh Pirates at Three Rivers Stadium, Lucas watched on television from his Atlanta home as Niekro won his 200th major league game, 5–2. Hours after congratulating Niekro by phone, Lucas was stricken with cardiac arrest and a massive cerebral hemorrhage. He died three days later without regaining consciousness at age 43. At his passing, he was still the highest-ranking black executive in professional baseball. Said Murphy at Lucas' funeral, "Bill's dream was for this organization to become a success. It is our sacred honor to be chosen to fulfill his dream."

Lucas' widow, Rubye, later served on the board of directors of the Turner Broadcasting System and as president of the William D. Lucas Fund, which helps send young baseball players to college. Lucas' sister, Barbara, was the former wife of Hall of Fame inductee Hank Aaron; the two were married from 1953 to 1971.

Sporting positions
Preceded by John Alevizos	Atlanta Braves General manager 1976–1979	Succeeded by John Mullen
