= Gerry Hunsicker =

American baseball executive (born 1950)

- Born: Gerald Hunsicker; June 10, 1950 (age 76); Collegeville, Pennsylvania, U.S.
- Education: Florida International University, Miami, Florida
- Occupation: Baseball executive

Gerald Hunsicker (born June 10, 1950) is an American baseball executive. He is the senior advisor of baseball operations for the Los Angeles Dodgers of Major League Baseball. Hunsicker has been an executive with the New York Mets and Tampa Bay Rays and the general manager of the Houston Astros from November 1995 until the end of the 2004 campaign. He graduated from Saint Joseph's College, Pa. in 1972.

== Early life ==
Hunsicker received a master's degree in education from Florida International University in Miami, Florida, in 1976. From 1975 to 1978, he was an assistant coach of the FIU baseball team, before entering professional baseball.

== Baseball career ==
From 1988 to 1992, he held various positions with the New York Mets, including director of minor league operations and assistant general manager.

He was hired by the Houston Astros as general manager by Drayton McLane on November 10, 1995.

Hunsicker would have eight MLB drafts to help assemble a lineup that contained two future Hall of Famers with Craig Biggio and Jeff Bagwell. His first pick as a GM in Mark Johnson did not work out, although he would be used in a trade for .300 hitter Moises Alou in 1998; other choices would develop better. Roy Oswalt was drafted by the team through shrewd scouting that resulted in a 23rd round pick in 1996; five years later, he would become a ten-year star for the Astros and be a key piece in the 2004 & 2005 teams. In 1997, he drafted Lance Berkman in the first round. He would make five appearances in the Major League Baseball All-Star Game in his eleven years spent with the Astros. After losing Darryl Kile in free agency to the Colorado Rockies, he used the compensation pick granted by the move to draft Brad Lidge with the 17th pick in the 1998 draft, and Chris Burke was drafted by him in 2001 as the tenth overall pick. He would also find some success within other rounds of the draft, such as Chad Qualls (2nd round, 2000), alongside Hunter Pence, (who had not signed when drafted by Milwaukee in 2002), and Ben Zobrist in 2004.

The Astros would have their first 100-win season in team history in 1998, which notably finished with the acquisition of Randy Johnson as a summer rental, for which the Seattle Mariners acquired three prospects (Freddy García, Carlos Guillén, and John Halama). Of the three prospects, only Garcia made an impact for the Mariners, having two All-Star Game selections.

Notable free agency signings included players such as Ken Caminiti (where he played 137 games in two seasons in the second tenure with the team), Jeff Kent (best known for his walk-off home run in Game 5 of the 2004 NLCS), Andy Pettite, and Roger Clemens. There were a handful of trades that would shape the Astros in later years, such as trading for Brad Ausmus in 2000 after he had been traded from the Detroit Tigers to Houston and vice versa in 1996 and 1999. Ausmus would be a mainstay in Houston in two tenures that combined for ten seasons. However, not all of his decisions worked to his benefit; most notably, when it came time to protect players for the 1997 expansion draft, he chose to protect Richard Hidalgo over Bobby Abreu (he would be selected by the Tampa Bay Rays, who bizarrely traded him soon after to the Philadelphia Phillies). While Hidalgo had a couple of decent years with the Astros, Abreu thrived well in Philadelphia, and Hunsicker admitted his mistake years later. An attempt to trade for five-time Cy Young Award winner Roger Clemens from the Toronto Blue Jays in late 1998 stalled due to their demands that left him angry at the agent of Clemens, who ended up landing with the New York Yankees for the next five seasons. Owner Drayton McLane tried to keep the interest alive, even coming to an idea to trade pitcher Scott Elarton, shortstop Julio Lugo and outfielder Richard Hidalgo to Toronto, but it fizzled out.

In nine seasons at the helm of general manager from 1996 to 2004, the Astros went 793–665 under four managers (Terry Collins, Larry Dierker, Jimy Williams, Phil Garner) while having a payroll generally out of the top ten in the majors. They would make the playoffs five times (including four division titles in a span of five seasons, all under Dierker), with just one season finishing under .500. In the playoffs, success was less forthcoming, as they lost in the first round each of the first four times. Billy Wagner had criticized the team (specifically ownership) in 2003 for not building a team worthy for the playoffs (owing from owner Drayton McLane trying to save money) and found himself traded after the year had ended. In 2004, however, things swung in the way of the Astros. It did not start out with the best of beginnings, as manager Jimy Williams would be fired after winning half of the team's first 88 games. A trade on June 24 between the Astros and two other teams gained them the services of Carlos Beltran, who would hit 23 home runs. Spurred on by the arrival of Phil Garner as manager, he would lead them on a hot streak that included winning 36 out of the last 46 games to finish 92-70 and sneak into the playoffs as a Wild Card team by one game. That year, Clemens would win the Cy Young Award (his seventh all-time) while Beltran tied the record for most home runs hit in a postseason with eight. The Astros would fall one win short of making the World Series, but Hunsicker's nucleus of players had reached a level that the Astros had not managed to reach before. He would step down as the GM for the Astros after the 2004 season, whereupon Tim Purpura would replace him. Reportedly, he resigned due to being tired of McLane's influences on team management, and it was believed that McLane was jealous of Hunsicker getting credit for the success of the team, which extended to Hunsicker being a friend to lower management, as he had to push for McLane to start a 401K retirement plan and have the team office remain closed between Christmas and New Year's Day. Hunsicker even interviewed for the New York Mets job in 2003 with McLane being close to letting him go. Former Astros manager Larry Dierker once related a story about how Hunsicker had to be the one to tell him about the displeasure shown by McLane because a Diamond level ticket holder didn't like Dierker resting prominent veterans for a game. Among the last things done with Hunsicker as general manager was to pick up the club option on Craig Biggio for 2005 (which amounted to $3 million) while declining the option for Jeff Kent (which was at $9 million); reportedly, the decision was more the idea of McLane (who apparently had been phoned directly by Biggio two years prior when he wanted a new contract) rather than Hunsicker. On November 1, 2004, Hunsicker resigned from his position.

He spent seven years with the Tampa Bay Rays as senior vice president, baseball operations and left that post to join the Dodgers front office in October 2012. Hunsicker advised Andrew Friedman with the Rays, and he was reunited with Friedman when he was named the Dodgers' president of baseball operations in October 2014.

== Legacy ==
Hunsicker is the longest-lasting general manager of the Astros. That year, led by Oswalt, Berkman, Clemens and various Astros acquired by Hunsicker, they advanced all the way to winning the National League pennant and advanced to the World Series (where they lost in four games).

In 2005, he was recognized by FIU as one of its outstanding alumni. He received his bachelor's degree from St. Joseph's University, Philadelphia, Pennsylvania.

Preceded by Bob Watson	Houston Astros General manager 1995–2004	Succeeded by Tim Purpura
