= Dick Wagner (baseball) =

American baseball executive

- Born: Richard Wagner; October 19, 1927; Central City, Nebraska, U.S.
- Died: October 5, 2006 (aged 78); Phoenix, Arizona, U.S.
- Occupation: Baseball executive

Richard Wagner (October 19, 1927 – October 5, 2006) was an American sports, entertainment, and broadcasting executive who spent twenty-five years in Major League Baseball. He was best known for running the Cincinnati Reds during the 1970s and the Houston Astros during the 1980s.

== Early life and careers ==
Born in Central City, Nebraska, Wagner's career in professional baseball began at a young age. In 1947, only 19 and fresh out of the Navy, he took a position as business manager of a Class D Georgia–Florida League team, a Detroit Tigers affiliate. In a prosperous era for the minor leagues, Wagner steadily worked his way up through leagues and classifications, shifting at one point to the Pittsburgh Pirates chain and working there under the tutelage of Branch Rickey. He held minor league administrative posts in Flint, Michigan; Miami, Florida; San Antonio, Texas; Hutchinson, Kansas; and Lincoln, Nebraska. At Lincoln, in 1958, he was named Top Minor League Executive of the Year by the Sporting News.

Shifting career tracks in 1959, Wagner took a position as General Manager of Pershing Auditorium in Lincoln, Nebraska. In the next decade, he held posts in entertainment and broadcasting. He was an executive for Ice Capades in Hollywood, California. In Salina, Kansas, Wagner ran radio station KSAL. He also served as general manager of The Forum in Inglewood, California, home of the Los Angeles Lakers and Kings. From the Forum, he returned to major league baseball, where he spent the remaining balance of his working years.

== Years with the Reds and the Astros ==
After several years as Director of Promotions with the St. Louis Cardinals under Bob Howsam, Wagner followed Howsam to the Cincinnati Reds in 1967. He spent the next fifteen years in the front office during that team's successful run as "The Big Red Machine", beginning by supervising business affairs for the Reds, helping to pioneer, develop and refine marketing and promotional efforts that resulted in a series of attendance records while soon being called Howsam's “hatchet man". Later, he added duties on the player personnel side and in 1978 was made president and general manager of the team. During the years Wagner was part of the organization, the Reds won consecutive World Series titles in 1975 and 1976, in addition to four league flags and six division titles. During his Cincinnati years, he resided in Glendale, Ohio, a greater Cincinnati suburb.

Wagner innovated the practice of Major League teams wearing green-trimmed uniforms on March 17 in honor of St. Patrick's Day. Wagner was the general manager of the Reds, and had green versions of the Reds' uniforms made. The Reds hosted the New York Yankees at Al Lopez Field on March 17, 1978. This was the first time a major league team wore green trimmed uniforms on March 17, a practice adopted in subsequent years by multiple major league teams on St. Patrick's Day. As a general manager, he made trades with the New York Mets by trading away George Foster and Tom Seaver (acquired by Howsam in 1977 from the Mets) to them in 1982. A trade for Vida Blue in early 1978 was scuttled by Commissioner Bowie Kuhn. He dismissed Sparky Anderson on November 27, 1978 when Anderson objected to the idea of shaking up his coaching staff. John McNamara would lead the Reds to the division title in 1979. The following year, Pete Rose left the Reds in free agency for the Philadelphia Phillies due to them not meeting his salary demands, which adhered to the practices of the team trying to not play the free agency market and rely on their farm system or with trades. This essentially marked the end of the Reds dominance, as the Reds did not make another postseason until 1990. Joe Morgan (who left the Reds in free agency after 1979) argued that Wagner was the one who effectively broke the "Big Red Machine" (it has also been said that the trade of Tony Perez to Montreal by Howsam in 1977 also took its toll on the team). Wagner continued as president and general manager until he was fired by the Reds on July 11, 1983 by owners James and Bill Williams, who replaced him with Bob Howsam on an interim basis.

Wagner was named general manager of the Houston Astros in September of 1985. Wagner acquired players such as Jim Deshaies and Billy Hatcher in his first winter as general manager of 1985. In 1986, various players would come through in free agency or in trades, such as Larry Andersen or Danny Darwin; both would play four years with the team, and while Andersen would later be part of a future legendary trade made by the Astros, Darwin never saw action as a postseason starter because he was being saved for a World Series bid (due to the Astros relying on a three-man trio of starters). His Astros won the 1986 National League West championship, clinching the division with a September 25 no-hitter by team pitching ace Mike Scott; the Astros lost in the 1986 National League Championship Series to the New York Mets in six games. Oddly, lead broadcaster Gene Elston was let go from the team after the season ended, reportedly at the request of Wagner. The 1987 Major League Baseball draft saw Wagner and the Astros pick Craig Biggio as their first round pick. Biggio would go on to play twenty seasons for the team as a future member of the Hall of Fame. Wagner resigned as general manager on October 14, 1987, following a power struggle with team manager Hal Lanier, who disagreed with Wagner over a perception of failing to trade for needs in the bullpen and in the infield. Wagner stated that a lack of understanding over what team owner John McMullen wanted from him was a key factor.

== Later years ==
In 1988, MLB commissioner Peter Ueberroth and American League President Bobby Brown named Wagner a special assistant in the commissioner office, where he would work closely with Brown. He served as a top-level aide for several years, and he ran the New York staff for a time when Bud Selig took over as commissioner in 1993.

Wagner retired to Phoenix, Arizona with his wife Gloria. There, he served on the board of the Western Art Associates of the Phoenix Art Museum and as a vice-president of the Association of Professional Ball Players of America. Wagner was involved in a car accident in 1999 that resulted in trauma and injuries that required attention for the rest of his life. He died in Phoenix in 2006 from complications of the car accident. He was survived by his two children.

Preceded by Bob Howsam	Cincinnati Reds General Manager; 1978–1983	Succeeded by Bob Howsam
Preceded by Al Rosen	Houston Astros General Manager; 1985–1987	Succeeded by Bill Wood
