= Dana Brown (baseball) =

American baseball executive (born 1967)

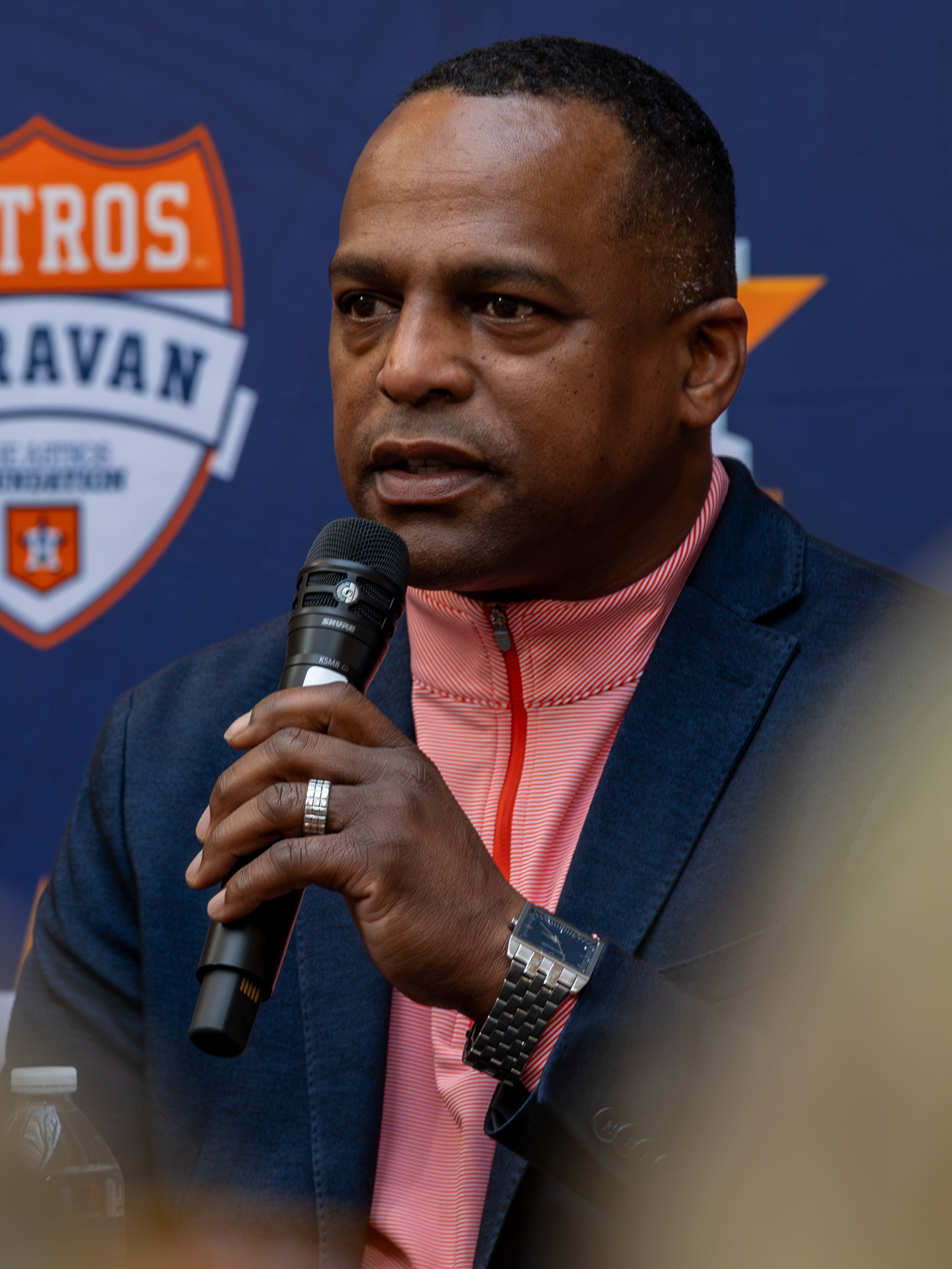
- Brown in 2024

Atlanta Braves
- General manager / Advisor
- Born: February 2, 1967 (age 59)

Teams
- Pittsburgh Pirates (1994–2002); Montreal Expos/Washington Nationals (2002–2009); Toronto Blue Jays (2010–2018); Atlanta Braves (2019–2022); Houston Astros (2023–2026); Atlanta Braves (2027–present

Dana Allen Brown (born February 19, 1967) is an American baseball executive who is a senior advisor in scouting for the Atlanta Braves of Major League Baseball (MLB). He previous served as the general manager of the Houston Astros from 2023 to 2026.

== Playing career ==
Brown grew up in New Brunswick, New Jersey and attended New Brunswick High School. He enrolled at Seton Hall University, where he played college baseball for the Seton Hall Pirates with future Major Leaguers Mo Vaughn, Craig Biggio, John Valentin, and Kevin Morton. In 1987, he played collegiate summer baseball with the Harwich Mariners of the Cape Cod Baseball League. The Philadelphia Phillies selected Brown in the 35th round of the 1989 Major League Baseball draft, and he played Minor League Baseball in the Phillies organization for three seasons.

== Coaching and front office career ==
=== Scouting ===
After his playing career, Brown continued as a Minor League coach with the Phillies before becoming a scout for the Pittsburgh Pirates in 1994. He was promoted to East Coast crosschecker with the Pirates before becoming the director of amateur scouting for the Montreal Expos in 2002. He remained with the franchise when they relocated, becoming the Washington Nationals. After the 2009 season, Alex Anthopoulos, the general manager of the Toronto Blue Jays and former assistant of Brown's with the Expos, hired Brown as a special assistant to the general manager. Brown served as the vice president of scouting for the Atlanta Braves from 2019 to 2022.

=== General manager ===
The Astros hired Brown as general manager on January 26, 2023.

On December 13, 2024, Brown completed one of the most significant trades in franchise history, sending three-time All-Star, Silver Slugger and Gold Glove Award winner Kyle Tucker to the Chicago Cubs for infielder Isaac Paredes, pitcher Hayden Wesneski, and third base prospect Cam Smith.

Brown and the Astros mutually agreed to part ways on August 24, 2026. During Brown's three full seasons as Houston's GM, the team qualified for the 2023 American League Championship Series (ALCS)—but were defeated—and won AL West division titles in 2023 and 2024.

=== Scouting ===
On October 31, 2026, Brown returned to the Atlanta Braves organization as senior advisor in their amateur scouting department.
