= Bill Wood (baseball) =

American baseball executive

Bill Wood (born 1941) is an American former baseball executive. He was the general manager (GM) of the Houston Astros from 1987 to 1993. He later worked in the front office of the Cincinnati Reds.

== Early life ==
Wood was born in Wichita Falls, Texas. He studied at the University of Texas and graduated with a degree in business and statistics.

== Baseball career ==
Wood started in baseball as the assistant general manager for the Albuquerque Dukes, a farm club of the Los Angeles Dodgers, in 1969. He moved within the Dodgers minor league system to serve as general manager of the Daytona Beach (1970) and El Paso teams (1971-72). After serving as general manager and part-owner of El Paso in 1973, he was hired to serve as assistant to the president of the National Association (the governing body of the minor leagues), and he served under Hank Peters and Bobby Bragan from 1973 to 1976.

Wood was hired in 1976 to work in minor league operations with the Houston Astros. Wood was the assistant director of Scouting and Minor League Clubs for the Astros in 1977 and 1978 before being promoted to serve as the team Director of Minor League Operations from 1979 to 1985. He was the assistant general manager in 1986 and 1987 to Dick Wagner, and he was promoted to GM on December 7, 1987, after being named acting general manager on October 14 with Wagner's resignation.

Wood was noted for drafting 21-year-old prospect Phil Nevin with the first overall pick of the 1992 MLB draft, even though Astros scout Hal Newhouser had encouraged the team to select high school standout Derek Jeter. Wood later regretted that decision, but he said the team chose Nevin because he would get to the major leagues faster than Jeter. Nevin did have a long career in the major leagues, but Jeter, who was selected sixth by the New York Yankees, became a baseball star.

Wood's most famous trade came under the August 31 deadline in 1990. The Boston Red Sox required a relief pitcher, and Larry Andersen was the one they desired from the Astros. Instead of getting his desired target of prospect Scott Cooper, Wood decided to accept Boston's offer to trade Andersen for prospect Jeff Bagwell (a third baseman on a team that had Wade Boggs entrenched at the position). While Andersen would help the Red Sox win their division that year, Bagwell converted to first base and played with the Astros for 15 seasons in a Hall of Fame career. Wood also was behind the conversion of Craig Biggio (drafted in 1987) from catcher to second base for the 1992 season.

At the time he was hired, the club was on the cusp of a downswing that required releasing highlight players of the mid-1980s teams to try to build again. The 1987 team had a 76–86 win-loss record, twenty wins less than the division winning 1986 team. In addition to the trade of Andersen for Bagwell, the team traded players like Bill Doran and Glenn Davis and brought on younger players such as Steve Finley, Curt Schilling, and Pete Harnisch, while experienced pitchers Danny Darwin and Dave Smith were allowed to leave in free agency. Kenny Lofton, who played his first games of his MLB career that year, was traded for a catching prospect and a pitcher on the Cleveland Indians. Darryl Kile (drafted in 1987) also made his impact for Wood's Astros when he made his debut in 1991. Luis Gonzalez (drafted in 1990) was quoted as saying the team had a quality nucleus that deserved to not be "torn apart". Nolan Ryan, who pitched for the Astros from 1980 to 1988, left for the Texas Rangers during Wood's tenure with Houston. The Astros had extended an $800,000 contract offer to Ryan rather than the million dollar contract he had played under for nine seasons; despite a second offer of $1.3 million from the Astros, Ryan signed with the Rangers for $1.6 million on December 8, 1988.

In Wood's six seasons as GM, the Astros had four seasons of a .500 winning percentage or better while finishing no better than third place in any of the seasons. Wood served as GM until he was fired by owner Drayton McLane (who had bought the team the previous year) on October 6, 1993. Wood was replaced by Bob Watson.

Wood was hired as a special assistant to the GM of the Cincinnati Reds in December 2003 and served in that capacity from 2004 to 2005.
