= Tal Smith =

American baseball executive (born 1933)

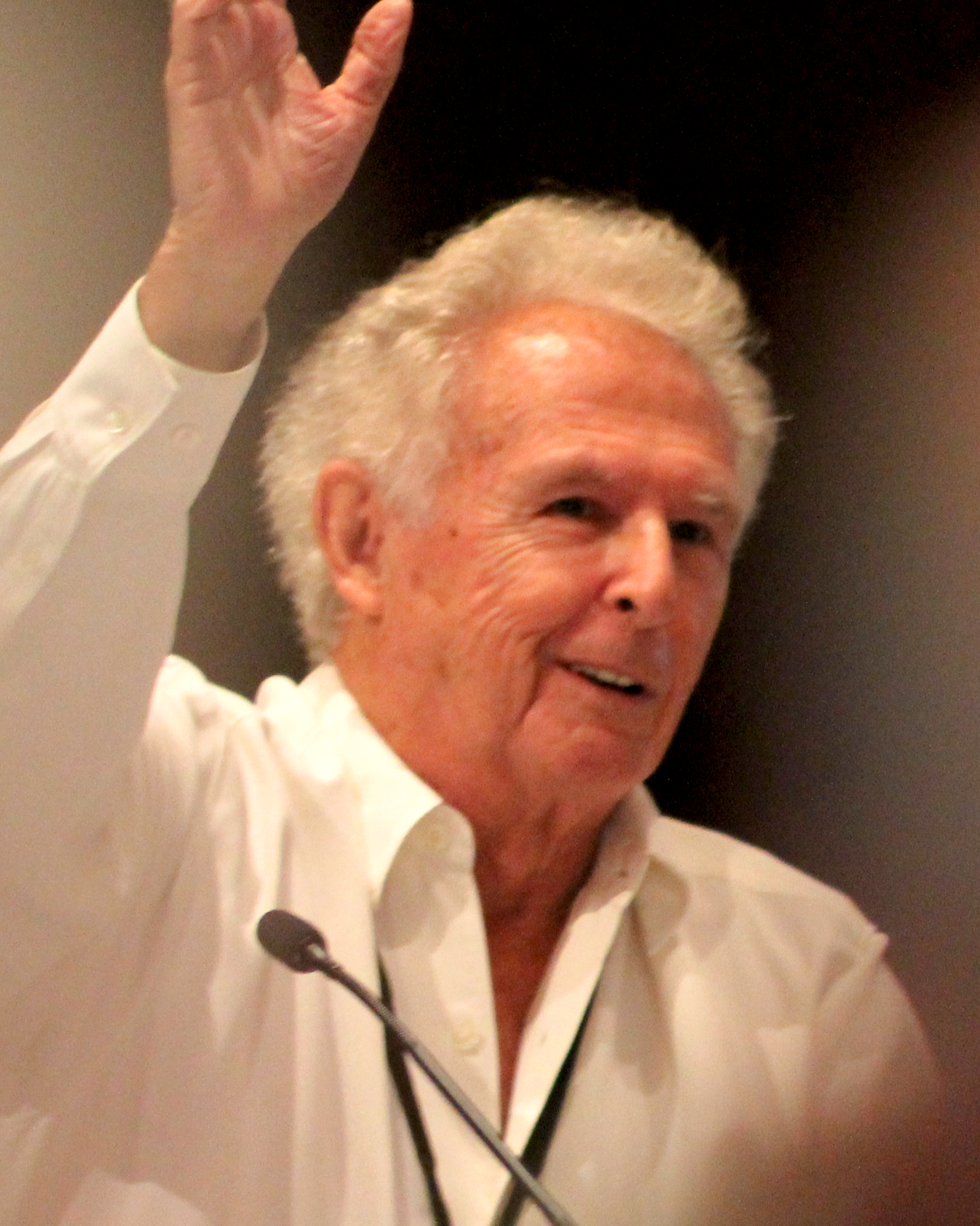
- Smith in 2014
- President of Baseball Operations
- Born: September 27, 1933 (age 92); Framingham, Massachusetts, U.S.

Teams
- Houston Astros (1976–1980, 1995–2011)

Career highlights and awards
- Houston Astros Hall of Fame

Talbot Merton Smith (born September 27, 1933) is an American former professional baseball executive who has served in high baseball operations positions—including general manager and club president—as well as the founder of a firm that advises Major League Baseball teams on salary arbitration cases.

A veteran of 54 years in baseball, he most recently served as president of baseball operations for the Houston Astros from November 22, 1994, through November 27, 2011—completing his 35th season with the Astros over three separate terms; in 2005, he received Baseball America's Lifetime Achievement Award. He is the father of baseball executive Randy Smith.

== Early life and baseball career ==
Tal Smith was born in Framingham, Massachusetts in 1933. He attended Culver Military Academy and Duke University. Upon graduating from Duke, he served as an officer in the United States Air Force for two years before briefly working as a sportswriter. He began his career in professional baseball in 1958 with the Cincinnati Reds as a protégé of general manager Gabe Paul. He moved from Cincinnati to Houston in November 1960 when Paul was named the general manager of the National League's newest franchise: the Colt .45s (renamed Astros in 1965). While Paul stayed only a few months in Texas before resigning to work as the front-office boss of the Cleveland Indians, Smith remained with Houston as the team's farm system director.

In April 1963, Smith became assistant to the president of the Houston Sports Association, acting as the primary liaison for its president Judge Roy Hofheinz during the construction of the Astrodome. The Astrodome changed the face of stadiums and the city of Houston. It was the world's first-ever indoor, air-conditioned stadium, and was nicknamed "the Eighth Wonder of the World." When natural grass failed to thrive under the Astrodome's roof, Smith was responsible for finding an alternative playing surface. This led to the installation of Astroturf, a synthetic turf that became widely used in stadiums throughout the country.

Following the completion of the Astrodome, Smith was promoted to vice president and director of player personnel after the 1965 season. In the late 1960s, he helped pioneer the implementation of computerized scouting reports and other player data.

When Gabe Paul surfaced as a member of George Steinbrenner's ownership syndicate, which purchased the New York Yankees early in 1973, he hired Smith away from the Astros as executive vice president and head of the Yankees' baseball operations department. Smith spent 2 1/2 seasons as a key part of the management team that built the Yankees back into a league power. But when the chance came to become the general manager of the Astros on August 7, 1975, Smith accepted it.

== Return to Houston as General Manager ==
Houston was in last place in the National League West division when Smith assumed the reins after the 1975 season, but under his leadership, the team rebuilt itself into a contender. Along the way, Smith was named team president and played a key role in resolving the club's ownership problem when he helped to convince Dr. John McMullen, a limited partner in Steinbrenner's ownership group, to sell his Yankees' shares and become the owner of the Astros. The Astros won their first division title in 1980, which was followed by a dramatic playoff series with the Phillies. The last four games of the series all went into extra innings, and the Astros were just 6 outs short of their first World Series appearance. He was recognized by The Sporting News as Major League Executive of the Year for his efforts.

However, in a move that shocked baseball, McMullen fired Smith only days after the team's successful 1980 season; McMullen went so far as to call Smith a "despicable human being". The move angered fans and partners. In fact, some of the Astros limited partners threatened a lawsuit and brought about a re-organization with the result that two other directors ended up on equal footing with McMullen. The Astros made the playoffs in 1981 before experiencing a slide that did not end until 1986.

Rather than seeking another front-office job, Smith formed his own consulting firm named Tal Smith Enterprises to advise MLB clubs on how best to handle salary arbitration cases with their players. His firm became extremely successful over the next 15 years.

== Third term in Astros' front office ==
In November 1994, Smith returned to the Astros (under then-owner Drayton McLane, Jr.) as president of baseball operations. Smith was a vital aide to McLane in the design of the Astros' new ballpark, Daikin Park, which opened in 2000. This was a similar role to the one he had in the construction of the Astros' first stadium, the Astrodome. Daikin Park's field dimensions and unique angles were designed with Smith's input and assistance. Until the 2017 season, center field included a 30-degree hill named "Tal's Hill" as a tribute to his creativity and contribution to the Daikin Park project.

The Astros made six playoff appearances from 1994-2005, culminating in their first National League Pennant in 2005. The Astros would lose to the Chicago White Sox in the 2005 World Series. On August 27, 2007, Smith was named acting GM after the firing of Tim Purpura. He re-assumed his previous position upon the appointment of Ed Wade as full-time GM on September 21, 2007. Both Wade and Smith were dismissed by the team's new owner, Houston businessman Jim Crane, when he assumed control of the Astros late in November 2011. According to news reports at the time, Smith still heads Tal Smith Enterprises.

In April 2012, Smith was announced as a special advisor for the Sugarland Skeeters of the Atlantic League.

== Honors ==
On January 27, 2022, it was announced that Smith would be elected to the Houston Astros Hall of Fame. He was inducted on August 13, 2022.

Baseball America recognized Smith for his career of achievements and innovations in 2005 by honoring him with the Lifetime Achievement Award. He is also a member of the Culver Academies Athletic Hall of Fame.
