= Jim Crane =

American businessman (born 1954)

- Born: January 17, 1954 (age 72)
- Education: Central Missouri State University (BS)
- Spouse(s): Sheri Crane, Theresa Crane (1981–1990), Franci Crane (1993–2015), Whitney Crane (2017–present)
- Awards: World Series Championship (2017, 2022)

James Robert Crane (born January 17, 1954) is an American businessman. Crane is chairman and chief executive of Crane Capital Group, Crane Worldwide Logistics, and Crane Freight and Shipping. He is also the owner and chairman of the Houston Astros of Major League Baseball (MLB). Under his ownership, the Astros have won two World Series championships (2017, 2022).

== Early life and education ==
Crane, who grew up in the north St. Louis suburb of Dellwood, Missouri, attended Lutheran High School North and graduated in 1972. He gave the school a donation of $1 million to improve their athletic facilities and enlarge the size of the campus from 40 acres to 67 in 2004. The school named the James R. Crane Athletic Complex for his contribution.

Crane earned a Bachelor of Science degree in industrial safety from Central Missouri State University (CMSU) (now the University of Central Missouri) in 1976, where he became a member of the fraternity, Tau Kappa Epsilon. Crane pitched for the Central Missouri Mules baseball team. He was an honorable mention Division II All-American going 21–8 with a 2.42 ERA for UCM. His father died between his freshman and sophomore years, and Crane seriously thought about dropping out of college; however, his coach, Robert N. Tompkins, drove to his home in north St. Louis and talked Crane into returning to school.

== Career ==
=== Freight and logistics ===
After graduating from college, Crane went into the insurance business. He moved to Houston in 1980, and in March 1984, Crane borrowed $10,000 from his sister and founded Eagle USA Airfreight, an air-freight logistics business.

Eagle USA Airfreight later became Eagle Global Logistics, and then EGL, Inc., and moved into the supply-chain management and information-services business. In August 2007, EGL merged with United Kingdom-based CEVA Logistics, owned by American private equity capital management and leveraged-buyout firm Apollo Management L.P. Crane owned about 17.6% of EGL's stock at the time of the merger. He had wanted to do a leveraged, management, or combination buyout of EGL, prior to the merger with CEVA, but was unable to obtain financing on acceptable terms. Later, after Crane obtained equity backing, he initially offered $36 per-share for EGL, but Apollo then engaged in a bidding war and the shareholders eventually went with the Apollo/CEVA offer of $47.50 per share. He was opposed to the EGL and CEVA merger.

Crane took his profits from EGL and formed Crane Capital Group. He also became a director and shareholder (less than 1%) in Western Gas Holdings, LLC, the general partner in Western Gas Partners, LP, a midstream (mainly pipelines and natural gas gathering assets) energy company operating in the southeastern Rocky Mountain region and southern Mid-Continent area (Oklahoma and Texas) of the United States. Also, Crane Capital Group invests in gas lines and freight shipping ports in the Russian Federation and the People's Republic of China. Western Gas Holdings and Western Gas Partners were acquired by Anadarko Petroleum. Crane is also the majority shareholder in Crane Worldwide Logistics LLC, chairman of the board for CargoJet, and director of both Nabors Industries and natural gas company Western Midstream.

=== Houston Astros ===
Crane first attempted to become a baseball owner in 2008, when he approached Drayton McLane about buying the team. However, he backed out at the last minute before a handshake deal could be done. He made bids to buy a team in both 2009 (for the Chicago Cubs) and 2010 (for the Texas Rangers), but neither effort succeeded, with the latter bid reportedly being rejected due to the influence of McLane despite reportedly being a better deal than the accepted one.

In May 2011, Crane reached an agreement to purchase the Houston Astros of Major League Baseball (MLB) from McLane for a reported $680 million. He was unanimously approved by MLB on November 17, 2011. MLB Commissioner Bud Selig intended for Houston to change divisions from the six-club National League Central to the four-club American League West. Crane received $35 million bumps from McLane and the MLB in exchange for this league-change stipulation, which was previously committed to by McLane.

When Crane purchased the team, they were coming off a season in which they won only 56 games. During his tenure as owner, the Astros experienced a turnaround in which they had three consecutive 100-win seasons (2017–2019), including World Series victories in 2017 and 2022. During the 2022 regular season, the Astros won 106 games, the second-highest total in franchise history.

After the 2022 season, the Astros offered general manager James Click a one-year contract extension, which he declined. In January 2023, Crane hired Dana Brown as the Astros general manager. He fired Brown and took over baseball operations for the Astros in August 2026.

=== Other businesses ===
Crane opened two restaurants in Houston in 2017, Osso and Kristalla, and Potente, named for his children. That year, he also started a commercial safety supply and training company called Crane Safety, and acquired Davaco, a company that manages and executes high-volume remodels and technology deployments. Also in 2017, Crane started a software company called Modiant to focus on digitizing freight and transportation management. In 2019, he became a partial owner at Aperture Cellars, a winery in Sonoma County and several franchises of Papa John's in Russia. He also owns a controlling interest in 21 Air, a non-scheduled air cargo carrier that provides services to Amazon, and which operated 21 Air Flight 7598, which overran the runway in Miami, killing 5 persons on the ground.

A scratch golfer, Crane has been ranked as the nation's top CEO golfer. In April 2010, he purchased the Floridian National Golf Club from Wayne Huizenga. The Floridian in Palm City, Florida, recently completed major renovations and additions under the supervision of architect Tom Fazio.

"It was two things (owning a team and a golf course) that I never thought I would be able to accomplish," Crane mused at his Floridian National Golf Club's reopening. "I was able to pull it together and I am very happy about it."

== Controversy ==
=== Eagle Logistics ===
In 2000, Eagle USA was subject of an Equal Employment Opportunity Commission investigation regarding hiring practices of minorities and women. Jim Crane was named personally in the lawsuit. An outside claims administrator later ruled that only 10% of claims had any validity, and the court returned $6M of the settlement fund to the company as they maintained denial of the allegations.

Eagle USA was also sued four separate times for allegations of war profiteering, and settled three cases between 2006 and 2008. Two officials pled guilty to different charges, but Crane himself was not named in those investigations.

=== Houston Astros ===
In Commissioner Rob Manfred’s statement on the Houston Astros sign stealing scandal, he noted, “Jim Crane was unaware of any of the violations of MLB rules by his Club.” In response to the scandal, Crane fired the team's general manager, Jeff Luhnow, and manager A. J. Hinch. In a press conference a month after the commissioner announced his findings, Crane said, "[stealing signs] didn't impact the game." At the same press conference, less than a minute later, he denied having said that, referencing the Commissioner's report and saying, "It's hard to determine how it impacted the game, if it impacted the game, and that's how we're going to leave it."

== Personal life ==
During the Memorial Day weekend in 2017, Crane married Whitney Wheeler. The ceremony took place at the Floridian National Golf Club. The marriage is Crane's fourth. Wheeler and he have a son together, James Robert Crane II. Crane's son Jared is senior vice president of executive operations for the Astros. His daughter, Krystal Crane Thompson, is a board member of the Crane Family Foundation.

== Philanthropy ==
In 1998, Crane was the largest donor in a $1.2 million upgrade of the CMSU baseball stadium, which was then named James R. Crane Stadium. As part of the donation, Crane renamed the baseball field in honor of Robert Tompkins, the CMSU baseball coach who did not let him drop out of school.

After buying the Astros in 2011, Crane began expanding the Astros Foundation by contributing donations and securing corporate partnerships. As of 2017, the foundation had grown from $50,000 to $12 million under his leadership. In 2017, the foundation's Community Leaders Program won MLB's 2017 Allan H. Selig Award for Philanthropic Excellence.

In 2017, Crane, the Astros ownership group, and the Astros Foundation committed $4 million to Hurricane Harvey relief efforts.

In 2018, he took ownership of the Houston Open to ensure that it stayed in Houston. The tournament is now operated under the Astros Golf Foundation.

In 2020, Crane donated $400,000 and 100,000 COVID test swabs and personal protective equipment to support local hospitals fighting the pandemic. Texas Medical Center president and CEO William McKeon said that Jim and Crane Worldwide were instrumental in helping supplies flow to the area.

In 2020, Crane and the Astros raised $2.6 million for the Astros Foundation and New Hope Housing.

In February 2021, Crane was named as one of 8 members of a fund advisory board for the Houston Harris County Winter Storm Relief Fund. The board is leading fundraising efforts and overseeing the grant making process for those in need as a result of the 2021 severe winter storm that occurred in Texas.

In August 2021, The Astros Foundation hosted a drive to collect non-perishable food, diapers and other supplies to areas in Louisiana impacted by Hurricane Ida. The Astros gave away free tickets to a game to anyone who donated to the drive, and Crane Worldwide, owned by Jim Crane, provided up to 30 large trucks to transport the supplies to those in need.

== Awards and recognition ==
- Two-time World Series champion (as owner of the Houston Astros – 2017, 2022)
- 2006: Number-one CEO Golfer, Golf Digest
- 2017: Inducted into the Missouri Sports Hall of Fame
- 2018: Inducted into the Texas Business Hall of Fame
- 2018: ALF Public Service Award by the American Leadership Forum
- 2018: Jack Buck Award from the Missouri Athletic Club
- 2019: Conversation with a Living Legend, University of Texas MD Anderson Cancer Center
- 2020: Houston Sports Award, Executive of the Year
- 2020: Ben Taub Humanitarian Award
- 2021: Inducted into the St. Louis Amateur Baseball Hall of Fame
