= Spain v United States (2009 FIFA Confederations Cup) =

Soccer game in Bloemfontein, South Africa and a part of 2009 FIFA Confederations Cup

Miracle on Grass
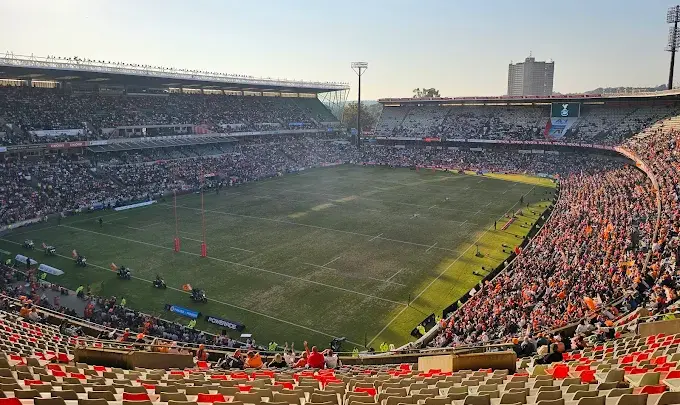
- Free State Stadium in Bloemfontein, venue of the game.
- Event: 2009 FIFA Confederations Cup
Spain	United States
0	2
- Date: June 24, 2009; 17 years ago
- Venue: Free State Stadium, Bloemfontein
- Bud MOTM: Clint Dempsey (United States)
- Referee: Jorge Larrionda (Uruguay)
- Attendance: 35,369
- Weather: Cold; 5 °C (41 °F); 60% humidity

On June 24, 2009, the first semi-final game of the 2009 FIFA Confederations Cup took place at the Free State Stadium in Bloemfontein, South Africa, between Spain and the United States. The two teams entered the semi-final with a clear disparity in form and standing. Heading into the match, Spain held the number one spot in the FIFA Men's World Ranking, boasted a 35-game unbeaten streak and a star-studded squad, and were the reigning UEFA Euro 2008 champions one years ago; conversely, the United States was considered the underdog, having struggled through the group stage and advanced to the knockout round only on tie-breakers. Experts predicted that Spain held a decisive advantage and was virtually certain to win. The two teams had also met three times previously, with Spain emerging victorious on every occasion.

However, events unfolded contrary to initial predictions; Spain dominated the match but conceded the opening goal to Jozy Altidore in the 27th minute. In the second half, Spain pushed forward in search of an equalizer but were thwarted by a series of saves from Tim Howard; they even conceded a second goal in the 74th minute after a lapse in defensive concentration allowed Clint Dempsey to rush in and score. Although they gained a numerical advantage when the USA's Michael Bradley was sent off in the 87th minute, there was not enough time left to salvage the situation. The game ended 2–0 in favor of the US, with Clint Dempsey named Budweiser Man of the Game.

This game was considered a great shock to the world of soccer, as a vastly superior team suffered defeat at the hands of an underdog; Spain viewed the loss as an "accident" that snapped their unbeaten streak. The result also marked their first-ever defeat against the United States at the senior international level, following three previous victories. Despite the loss, public opinion in Spain was not overly disappointed, as the pressure of maintaining the unbeaten run had become unsustainable. Conversely, the United States was stunned and subsequently overjoyed by the home team's victory; the match received extensive media coverage, with some outlets hailing it as "one of the greatest victories in the history of the nation's football", while other articles even dubbed the game the "Miracle on Grass" evoking the "Miracle on Ice" achieved by the nation's ice hockey team at the 1980 Winter Olympics Ice hockey event. Spain went on to defeat hosts South Africa 3–2 in the third-place play-off, while the United States advanced to the final but lost 2–3 to Brazil.

The result of this game not only snapped the opponent's unbeaten streak, but also generated unprecedented media buzz in the United States, a country where soccer is not typically the sport that commands the most attention. From that point on, soccer in the United States, particularly Major League Soccer (MLS), has undergone significant transformations in terms of sporting quality, media presence, and public image. The league has continuously expanded through the addition of new clubs and an increase in the number of soccer-specific stadiums built across various states. Furthermore, MLS has emerged as an attractive destination for renowned players from around the world. For Spain, this defeat was not viewed as a disgrace but rather as a "lesson" that helped the team avoid complacency during crucial moments; just a year later, they won their first-ever World Cup title and went on to successfully defend their UEFA European Championship two years after that.

== Background ==
The 2009 FIFA Confederations Cup is the eighth Confederations Cup, an international soccer tournament for men's national teams, held every four years by FIFA. It was contested by the holders of each of the six continental championships (AFC, CAF, CONCACAF, CONMEBOL, OFC, and UEFA), along with the current FIFA World Cup holder and the host nation, to bring the number of teams up to eight. On 2009, the tournament was held in South Africa from June 14 to June 28, as a prelude to the 2010 FIFA World Cup. The draw was held on November 22, 2008 at the Sandton Convention Centre in Johannesburg. The opening game and the final was played at Ellis Park Stadium in Johannesburg.

The eight teams qualifying for the tournament — comprising the FIFA World Cup host nation, the reigning World Cup champion, and the winners of continental championships (based on titleholders from the 2006 FIFA World Cup through the end of 2008) are as follows:

Team	Confederation	Qualification method	Date qualification secured	Participation no.
South Africa	CAF	Hosts	May 15, 2004	2nd
Italy	UEFA	2006 FIFA World Cup winners	July 9, 2006	1st
United States	CONCACAF	2007 CONCACAF Gold Cup winners	June 24, 2007	4th
Brazil	CONMEBOL	2007 Copa América winners	July 15, 2007	6th
Iraq	AFC	2007 AFC Asian Cup winners	July 29, 2007	1st
Egypt	CAF	2008 Africa Cup of Nations winners	February 10, 2008	2nd
Spain	UEFA	UEFA Euro 2008 winners	June 29, 2008	1st
New Zealand	OFC	2008 OFC Nations Cup winners	November 19, 2008	3rd

Teams from the same confederation were not drawn into the same group, therefore Egypt was drawn into Group B. Also as result, Italy and Spain were drawn into different groups.

== Path to the knockout stage ==
=== Spain ===
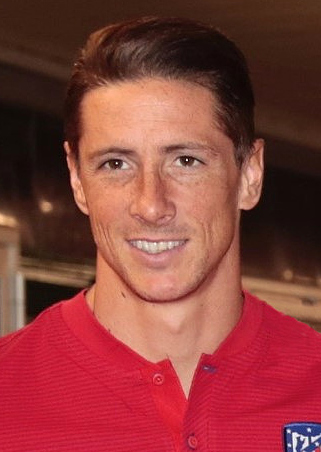
Fernando Torres, who scored hat-trick against New Zealand.

According to the draw results, Spain has been placed in Group A alongside New Zealand (2008 OFC Nations Cup winners), Iraq (2007 AFC Asian Cup winners) and hosts South Africa. The team played their first game against New Zealand, Spain established an early lead in the first half as striker Fernando Torres scored three consecutive goals in the 6th, 14th, and 17th minutes (hat-trick). In the 24th minute, Cesc Fàbregas expansed the lead to 4–0 following a coordinated attacking play. Just two minutes into the second half, David Villa capitalized on a defensive error by New Zealand to score the final goal, making it 5–0 in the 48th minute. In their second game, facing Iraq, Spain struggled to penetrate the defense—organized in numbers by coach Bora Milutinović—throughout the first half. It was not until the 55th minute that striker David Villa opened the scoring, heading the ball into the far corner from a cross delivered by left-back Joan Capdevila. This proved to be the only goal of the game, securing a narrow 1–0 victory for Spain and guaranteeing their spot in the semi-finals with a game to spare.

The final group stage game took place on June 20, 2009, with Spain facing hosts South Africa to determine the top two spots in the group. The first half ended goalless as both teams maintained tight defensive setups. A turning point arrived in the 51st minute when Spain was awarded a penalty after a South African defender fouled an opposing striker inside the box; however, David Villa failed to convert, as his effort was saved by goalkeeper Itumeleng Khune. Nevertheless, just a minute later, Villa redeemed himself by controlling the ball with his chest and scoring the opening goal in the 52nd minute. In the 72nd minute, substitute striker Fernando Llorente capitalized on a scramble following a free-kick to score from close range, sealing a 2–0 victory for Spain.

=== United States ===
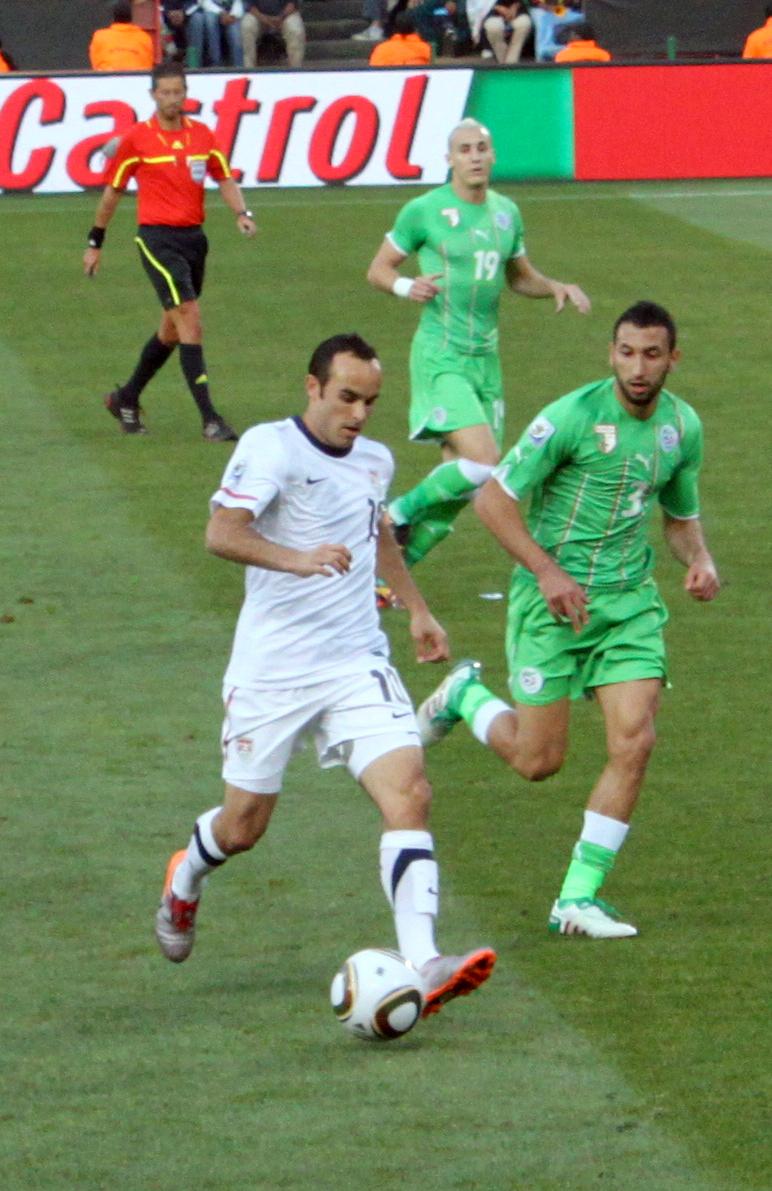
Donovan (left) playing against Algeria at the 2010 FIFA World Cup

The Americans played their first game in Group B against Italy and held the World Cup champions to a scoreless first half, despite a red card being shown to midfielder Ricardo Clark, who tackled Gennaro Gattuso in the 33rd minute. A challenge by Giorgio Chiellini on Jozy Altidore earned a penalty for the United States, which was scored by Landon Donovan in the 41st minute and gave them a half-time lead. The Italians equalised in the 58th minute through a 30-yard (27 m) strike by American-born striker Giuseppe Rossi, who had been substituted a minute before and stole possession from Benny Feilhaber in the midfield to set up the shot. The team then took the lead through another long-distance shot in the 72nd minute by Daniele De Rossi and finished their 3–1 victory with a second goal for Rossi in extra time following a chipped cross by Andrea Pirlo.

The eventual finalists faced each other at Loftus Versfeld Stadium in Pretoria on the second gameday, which ended in a 3–0 victory for Brazil. Maicon took a free kick from 35 yards (32 m) that found Felipe Melo, who headed it from the box to score the opening goal in the seventh minute. The lead was extended in the 20th minute after DaMarcus Beasley lost possession after a U.S. corner, which was dribbled upfield by Ramires and passed to Robinho, whose shot went past Tim Howard into the goal. U.S. midfielder Sacha Kljestan was sent off for a foul in the 57th minute and the team lost momentum that they had gained in the second half before conceding a final goal to Brazil five minutes later through a shot by Maicon from a narrow angle near the touchline. Although the U.S. lost their first two games, they were still eligible to advance following an upset victory for Egypt over Italy that kept them from being mathematically eliminated.

In their final group stage game against Egypt, the United States took the lead in the 21st minute following a mistake by goalkeeper Essam Al Hadary that allowed Charlie Davies to score from the loose ball in the box. Midfielder Michael Bradley then scored in the 63rd minute following a series of give-and-go passes with Landon Donovan, and Clint Dempsey added a third by heading in a cross from Jonathan Spector in the 71st minute. With their 3–0 victory, the United States were tied on three points with Italy and Egypt and tied the former with a goal difference of −2. The United States were able to advance on the second tie-breaker (goals scored), having scored four goals to Italy's three.

=== Summary of results ===
Note: In all results below, the score of the semi-finalist team is given first.

==== Group standings ====
Group A standings
Pos	Team	Pld	Pts
1	Spain	3	9
2	South Africa (H)	3	4
3	Iraq	3	2
4	New Zealand	3	1

Source: FIFA
(H) Hosts

Group B standings
Pos	Team	Pld	Pts
1	Brazil	3	9
2	United States	3	3
3	Italy	3	3
4	Egypt	3	3

Source: FIFA

==== Results ====
Group stage games
Spain (Record: 3–0–0)

Game	Date	Opponent	Stadium	Venue	Result	Goals	Attendance	Referee
1	June 14	New Zealand	Royal Bafokeng	Rustenburg	W 5–0	Fernando Torres 6', 14', 17'; Cesc Fàbregas 24'; David Villa 48'	21,649	Coffi Codjia
2	June 17	Iraq	Free State	Bloemfontein	W 1–0	David Villa 55'	30,512	Matthew Breeze
3	June 20	South Africa	Free State	Bloemfontein	W 2–0	David Villa 52'; Fernando Llorente 72'	38,212	Pablo Pozo

United States (Record: 1–2–0)

Game	Date	Opponent	Stadium	Venue	Result	Goals	Attendance	Referee
1	June 15	Italy	Loftus Versfeld	Pretoria	L 1–3	Landon Donovan 41' (p)	34,341	Pablo Pozo
2	June 18	Brazil	Loftus Versfeld	Pretoria	L 0–3	No goals	39,617	Massimo Busacca
3	June 21	Egypt	Royal Bafokeng	Rustenburg	W 3–0	Charlie Davies 21'; Michael Bradley 63'; Clint Dempsey 71'	23,140	Michael Hester

Legend: = Win = Loss = Tied

== Game summary ==
=== Details ===
In the first half, Spain took the initiative in possession and employed their trademark short-passing game, but the United States' high-pressing defensive system restricted the space available to the opposing midfielders. In the 27th minute, following a pass from Clint Dempsey, striker Jozy Altidore used his physical strength to beat defender Joan Capdevila before turning and firing home to open the scoring for the U.S. The remainder of the half saw sustained attacking pressure from Spain, driven by the mobility of Xavi and Cesc Fàbregas, yet opportunities for David Villa and Fernando Torres were thwarted by goalkeeper Tim Howard.

Spain coach Vicente del Bosque urged his players to push forward in search of an equalizer during the second half. They applied suffocating pressure in the U.S. half, creating a series of dangerous chances, but goalkeeper Tim Howard pulled off a string of brilliant saves. In the 74th minute, during a U.S. counterattack down the right flank, Landon Donovan fired a low cross into the penalty area. Spanish defender Sergio Ramos mishandled the ball, allowing Clint Dempsey to rush in and score from close range, extending the lead to 2–0. In the 86th minute, the United States was reduced to ten men after midfielder Michael Bradley received a straight red card for a dangerous tackle on Xavi. Despite playing shorthanded in the closing stages and facing intense pressure from Spain's repeated counter-attacks, the U.S. successfully held onto their two-goal lead until the final whistle.

=== Box score ===
June 24, 2009
20:30 SAST
Semifinal

Spain	0–2	United States
	Report	Jozy Altidore 27'; Clint Dempsey 74'

Free State Stadium, Bloemfontein
Attendance: 35,369
Referee: Jorge Larrionda (Uruguay)

Spain	United States

GK	1	Iker Casillas (c)
RB	15	Sergio Ramos
CB	3	Gerard Piqué	(yellow card) 89'
CB	5	Carles Puyol
LB	11	Joan Capdevila	(yellow card) 36'
DM	14	Xabi Alonso
RM	10	Cesc Fàbregas		(substituted off) 68'
LM	18	Albert Riera		(substituted off) 78'
AM	8	Xavi
SS	7	David Villa
CF	9	Fernando Torres
Substitutions:
RM	20	Santi Cazorla		(substituted on) 68'
LM	22	Juan Mata		(substituted on) 78'
Manager:
Vicente del Bosque

GK	1	Tim Howard
RB	21	Jonathan Spector
CB	15	Jay DeMerit
CB	5	Oguchi Onyewu
LB	3	Carlos Bocanegra (c)
CM	13	Ricardo Clark
CM	12	Michael Bradley	(red card) 87'
RW	8	Clint Dempsey		(substituted off) 88'
LW	10	Landon Donovan	(yellow card) 5'
CF	9	Charlie Davies		(substituted off) 69'
CF	17	Jozy Altidore	(yellow card) 28'	(substituted off) 83'
Substitutions:
MF	22	Benny Feilhaber		(substituted on) 69'
CF	4	Conor Casey		(substituted on) 83'
LB	2	Jonathan Bornstein		(substituted on) 88'
Manager:
Bob Bradley

Budweiser Man of the Match:
Clint Dempsey (United States)

Assistant referees:
Pablo Fandino (Uruguay)
Mauricio Espinosa (Uruguay)
Fourth official:
Coffi Codjia (Benin)
Reserve assistant referee:
Alexis Fassinou (Benin)
Game commissioner:
Tai Nicholas (New Zealand)
General coordinator:
Helmut Sandrock (Germany)

Match rules

- 90 minutes
- 30 minutes of extra time if necessary
- Penalty shoot-out if scores still level
- Maximum of twelve named substitutes
- Maximum of three substitutions

Scoring summary
Half	Team	Scorer	Assist(s)	Minute	Score
1st	USA	Jozy Altidore (17)	Clint Dempsey (8)	27	1–0 USA
2nd	USA	Clint Dempsey (8)	Unassisted	74	2–0 USA
Card summary
Half	Team	Player	Reason	Minute	Color
1st	USA	Landon Donovan (23)	Tactical foul	5	Yellow
1st	USA	Jozy Altidore (17)	Excessive goal celebration	28	Yellow
1st	ESP	Joan Capdevila (11)	Bad foul	36	Yellow
2nd	USA	Michael Bradley (12)	Dangerous tackle	86	Red (D)
2nd	ESP	Gerard Piqué (3)	Dissent	89	Yellow

=== Statistical comparison ===
Team-to-team comparison
Statistic	Spain	United States
Attempts	29	9
On target	8	2
Fouls committed	13	9
Corner kicks	17	3
Free kicks	0	0
Offsides	7	4
Own goals	0	0
Cautions	2	2
Indirect ejections	0	0
Direct ejections	0	1
Ball possession (%)	56	44
Actual playing time	37	29

== Later games ==
=== Spain ===
June 28, 2009
15:00 SAST
Third place play-off

Spain	3–2 (a.e.t.)	South Africa
Dani Güiza 88', 89'; Xabi Alonso 107'	Report	Katlego Mphela 73', 90+3'

Royal Bafokeng Stadium, Rustenburg
Attendance: 31,788
Referee: Matthew Breeze (Australia)

After their loss to the United States, Spain faced hosts South Africa in the third-place play-off. Following a goalless first half, the match dynamic shifted in the latter part of the second half. In the 73rd minute, South African substitute Katlego Mphela opened the scoring, assisted by Siphiwe Tshabalala. However, Spain equalized late in the game through striker Dani Güiza — who had also come off the bench — and just a minute later, he scored again to make it 2–1 with a shot from a tight angle on the right. In the third minute of stoppage time, Katlego Mphela successfully converted a free-kick from approximately 30 yards (27 m) out, leveling the score at 2–2 and forcing the game into extra time.

The game-winning goal came in the 107th minute of extra time, scored by midfielder Xabi Alonso from a set-piece on the left flank; he curled the ball into the far corner of goalkeeper Itumeleng Khune's net, sealing a 3–2 victory for Spain. With this result, Spain secured the bronze medal, while hosts South Africa finished the tournament in fourth place.

=== United States ===
June 28, 2009
20:30 SAST
Final

United States	2–3	Brazil
Clint Dempsey 10'; Landon Donovan 27'	Report	Luís Fabiano 46', 74'; Lúcio 84'

Ellis Park Stadium, Johannesburg
Attendance: 52,291
Referee: Martin Hansson (Sweden)

The United States advanced to the final to face Brazil — the team they had previously lost to in the group stage. The United States took an early lead in the 10th minute, following a free kick taken by Jonathan Spector that was crossed into the path of Clint Dempsey, who struck the ball with his right foot. Goalkeeper Tim Howard then made several major saves to preserve the lead amid several Brazilian attacks; the Americans took advantage of a counterattack, with Ricardo Clark running upfield and passing to Landon Donovan, shooting from just inside the box to score in the 27th minute. However, Brazil subsequently scored three consecutive goals in the second half, handing the United States a narrow 2–3 defeat and leaving them as runners-up.

== Post-game ==
=== Reactions ===
==== Spain ====
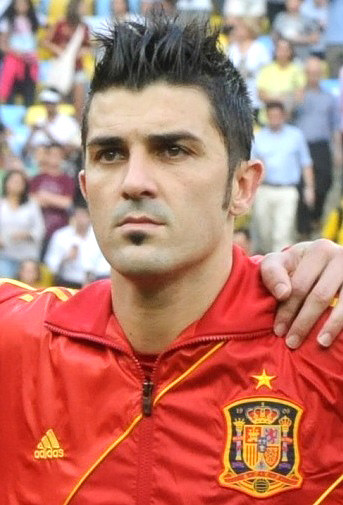
David Villa expressed regret at being unable to score against the disciplined U.S. defense.

Vicente del Bosque, the head coach of Spain, displayed a calm and respectful attitude toward his opponents, accepting the result even though his team’s winning streak came to an unexpected end. Rather than offering excuses for the defeat, he acknowledged that the United States had played with great physical intensity, a disciplined defensive approach, and an effective ability to capitalize on their opportunities:

"The U.S. displayed formidable physical strength. Their attacks were sharp and incredibly swift, with almost no time spent in the midfield; instead, they consistently sought the most direct route toward our goal. We were genuinely taken aback by their performance. The team tried to push the ball up the flanks because attacking through the middle proved too difficult. We created several chances but failed to convert them; subsequently, our opponents rallied and generated a number of dangerous situations."

He also emphasized that defeat is an unavoidable part of football, and that the end of their unbeaten streak did not signify a crisis in Spain’s form or style of play. He viewed this as a valuable, timely lesson—one that helped the team identify areas for improvement ahead of the 2010 FIFA World Cup a year later. According to several sources, key Spanish players acknowledged their opponents' superiority during the match. Goalkeeper Iker Casillas noted that Spain’s defense committed individual errors, which led to the two goals scored by Jozy Altidore and Clint Dempsey. However, he insisted that the team should not dwell on the defeat, but rather refocus quickly for the third-place play-off and future campaigns. Xavi observed that the United States employed a highly effective defensive, counter-attacking strategy—stretching Spain’s midfield and minimizing available space to create dangerous scoring opportunities.

The two players leading the forward, Fernando Torres and David Villa, expressed both regret and a sense of helplessness at their inability to break through the opposition’s disciplined and tenacious defense; they also praised the outstanding performance of U.S. goalkeeper Tim Howard, who thwarted numerous attempts on goal from both of them.

==== United States ====
In stark contrast to Spain, the atmosphere in the U.S. locker room was one of overwhelming pride in a historic achievement; coach Bob Bradley could not hide his delight at his team’s accomplishment and the performance of his players:

“It’s exciting, a great team effort. To beat an amazing team like Spain and make the final, it’s big. We played as hard as we could and that’s what it took. Every guy contributed, so it’s a very good feeling. We take a few hours to regroup, but we’ll be ready. We’re so excited about this.”

Goalkeeper Tim Howard also proved to be outstanding, as he himself made numerous saves that helped the U.S. keep a clean sheet and advance to the final:

“I can’t explain it any more than you can. Sports is funny sometimes, but when you put your mind to something, you can achieve it.”

Jozy Altidore and Clint Dempsey, who scored in the match, attributed the victory to an unwavering belief in a counter-attacking strategy and the team’s mutual support throughout the 90 minutes. Meanwhile, goalkeeper Tim Howard earned widespread praise for his spectacular saves, keeping a clean sheet despite intense pressure from the Spanish attack.

=== Recalling the "Miracle on Ice" ===
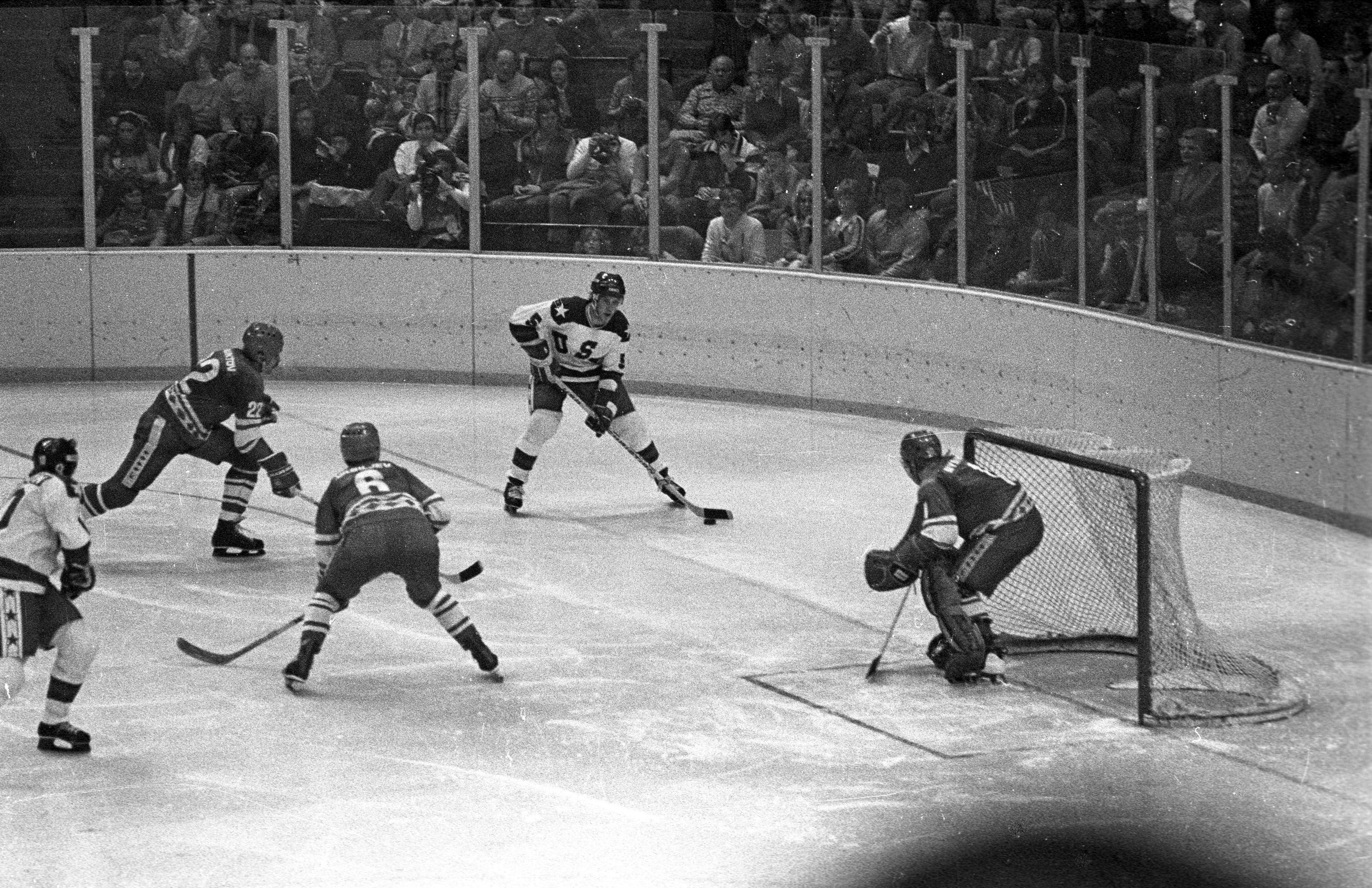
Miracle on Ice, the game in 1980 Winter Olympics Ice hockey event that the United States won against Soviet Union.

International media hailed this game as one of the biggest upsets in world soccer history, as the United States team ended the 35-match unbeaten streak and 15-game winning streak of Spain, the winner of UEFA Euro 2008 and the world's top-ranked team at the time. This game result drew widespread attention from both U.S. and international media, even though soccer often takes a back seat to other popular sports in the United States, such as American football, baseball, and basketball. The New York Times hailed this match as one of the biggest upsets in international soccer in decades, ending Spain's 35-game unbeaten streak. The publication used the phrase "Miracle on Grass" drawing a parallel to the historic 1–0 victory over England at the 1950 FIFA World Cup.

The name of The New York Times is also derived from a comparison to the "Miracle on Ice" event of 1980, when the United States team led by head coach Herb Brooks, was composed mostly of amateur players; only four players had any experience beyond that level, and even then all four had only minimal, minor-league experience. In addition, the United States had the youngest team in the tournament and in U.S. national team history. In the group stage, both the Soviet and American teams were undefeated; the U.S. achieved several surprising results, including a 2–2 draw against Sweden, and a 7–3 upset victory over second-place favorite Czechoslovakia. For the first game in the medal round, the Americans played the Soviets. Finishing the first period tied at 2–2, and the Soviets leading 3–2 following the second, the U.S. team scored two more goals to take their first lead midway in the third and final period, then held out to win by a score of 4–3. Similarly, in 2009, the USMNT reached the semi-finals after advancing from the group stage on tie-breakers with a 1–2–0 record, while their opponent, Spain — the reigning European champions — held an unbeaten streak of 35 consecutive games, setting a world record at the time.

=== Spanish newspaper reaction ===
Immediately after the game, major Spanish sports newspapers described the result as a massive upset. Marca suggested that the United States' opening goal left the players stunned and caused them to lose their characteristic composure, while Diario AS highlighted the end of the national team's unbeaten streak at the hands of an underdog. Mundo Deportivo described the game as a 'humbling lesson' that ended the team's 35-game unbeaten streak, praised the U.S. team's effective and sharp style of play, and highlighted the struggles of the reigning UEFA Euro 2008 champions throughout the game, and El País noted that Spain's possession-based game had stalled against the opponent's disciplined defense. From a technical standpoint, the Spanish press focused its criticism on the attack's lack of efficiency and defensive errors, despite dominating possession and outshooting their opponents, forwards such as Fernando Torres and David Villa were unable to beat U.S. goalkeeper Tim Howard. Meanwhile, individual defensive lapses led to two goals conceded against strikes from Jozy Altidore and Clint Dempsey. Observers also noted that the Spanish team lacked alternative attacking options when the opposition sat deep and maintained a disciplined defensive shape.

== Influence ==
The victory in South Africa also served as a crucial turning point for several domestic-based players. Following the tournament, European scouts began paying significantly more attention to talent within the MLS. Houston Dynamo midfielder Ricardo Clark, on the back of his performances in the tournament and the concurrent MLS season, moved to Eintracht Frankfurt in the Bundesliga in early 2010. Also, players such as Sacha Kljestan (Chivas USA) and Stu Holden (Houston Dynamo) saw their individual market value rise, paving the way for their subsequent transfers to Europe. Furthermore, a string of consistent performances throughout 2009 facilitated Landon Donovan’s successful short-term loan move to Everton in the English Premier League in early 2010.
