= Jim Edmonds =

American baseball player (born 1970)

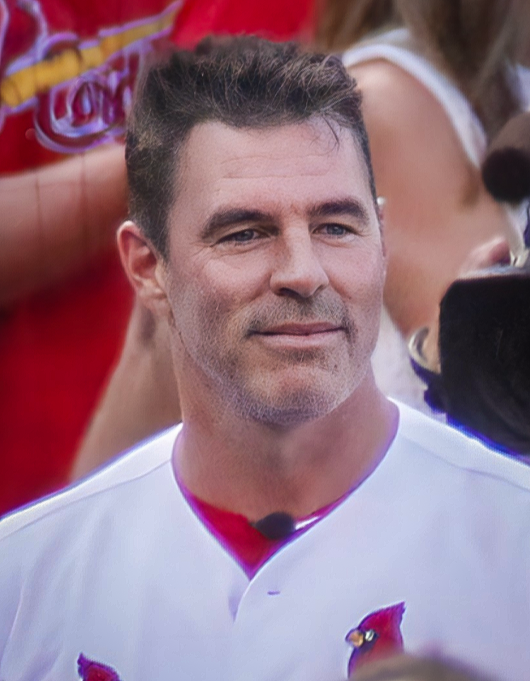
- Edmonds in 2023
- Center fielder
- Born: June 27, 1970 (age 56); Fullerton, California, U.S.
- Batted: Left Threw: Left

MLB debut
- September 9, 1993, for the California Angels

Last MLB appearance
- September 21, 2010, for the Cincinnati Reds

MLB statistics
- Batting average: .284
- Home runs: 393
- Runs batted in: 1,199
- Stats at Baseball Reference

Teams
- California / Anaheim Angels (1993–1999); St. Louis Cardinals (2000–2007); San Diego Padres (2008); Chicago Cubs (2008); Milwaukee Brewers (2010); Cincinnati Reds (2010)

Career highlights and awards
- 4× All-Star (1995, 2000, 2003, 2005); World Series champion (2006); 8× Gold Glove Award (1997, 1998, 2000–2005); Silver Slugger Award (2004); St. Louis Cardinals Hall of Fame

James Patrick Edmonds (born June 27, 1970) is an American former professional baseball center fielder and sports commentator. He played 17 seasons in Major League Baseball (MLB) for the California / Anaheim Angels, St. Louis Cardinals, San Diego Padres, Chicago Cubs, Milwaukee Brewers, and Cincinnati Reds from 1993 to 2010.

Edmonds was well known for his defensive abilities, earning eight Gold Glove Awards. He also was a prolific hitter, batting .284 with 393 home runs and an on-base plus slugging percentage (OPS) of .903. He is affectionately known by Cardinal fans as "Jimmy Baseball" or "Jimmy Ballgame".

== Early life ==
Edmonds was born on June 27, 1970, in Fullerton, California. His parents divorced when he was a child and had joint custody. His father's home was within a few miles of Anaheim Stadium. He attended Diamond Bar High School in Diamond Bar in eastern Los Angeles County.

== Professional career ==
=== California / Anaheim Angels ===
==== 1988–1993: Minor leagues ====
Edmonds was selected in the seventh round of the 1988 Major League Baseball draft by the California Angels. He had injured his shoulder in his senior year of high school, causing him to fall in the draft.

Following the draft, he was assigned to the Bend Bucks, the Angels' A-Short Season affiliate in the Northwest League. In 1988, he played in 35 games for the Bucks and hit .221 with no home runs and 13 runs batted in. The following year, he was promoted to the Quad Cities Angels, the team's Class-A affiliate in the Midwest League. He played in 31 games and hit .261 with 1 home run and 4 RBIs.

In 1990, Edmonds advanced to the Palm Springs Angels, the Angels' High-A affiliate in the California League. He played 91 games and hit .293 with 3 home runs and 56 RBIs. He remained with Palm Springs for the 1991 season, playing 60 games while batting .294 with two home runs and 27 RBIs. In 1992, he was promoted to Double-A with the Midland Angels in the Texas League. He hit .313 with eight home runs and 32 RBIs in 70 games for Midland. He was promoted again in 1992, moving up to the Triple-A Edmonton Trappers for 50 games, batting .299 with six home runs and 36 RBIs. In 1993, Edmonds played for the new Angels Triple-A affiliate, the Vancouver Canadians. He played 95 games for the team, batting .315 and hitting nine home runs with 74 RBIs.

==== 1993–1996: Emergence as a power hitter ====
On September 7, 1993, the Angels promoted Edmonds to the majors for the first time. He made his MLB debut on September 9, starting in left field against the Detroit Tigers at Tiger Stadium, going 0-for-4 with two strikeouts. Edmonds collected his first major league hit on September 10 against the Toronto Blue Jays in the SkyDome, a pinch-hit double in the ninth inning off of Duane Ward. Edmonds collected his first major league RBI on September 14 against Seattle Mariners pitcher Roger Salkeld, driving in Chad Curtis with a single. In his September call-up 1993 season, Edmonds batted .246 in 61 at-bats across 18 games.

Despite the signings of outfielders Bo Jackson and Dwight Smith in the offseason, Edmonds made the Angels' 1994 Opening Day roster. Edmonds received sporadic playing time for the first half of the season, often pinch hitting and rarely starting games. He did not hit his first major league home run until May 11, 1994, in a game against the Texas Rangers where he hit a two-run shot off Rick Helling. Through his first 50 games in 1994, Edmonds was batting .328 with a .405 on-base percentage. By June, Edmonds began to receive more regular playing time, serving as the primary left fielder after Bo Jackson had been benched and Dwight Smith had been traded to Baltimore. Midway through the season, Edmonds was considered by the media to be a prime candidate for the AL Rookie of the Year Award. Although Edmonds's high averages regressed as he played more games, he finished the strike-shortened season batting .273 with five home runs and 37 RBIs. He placed eighth in AL Rookie of the Year voting.

With the departure of Chad Curtis in the offseason, Edmonds became the Angels' everyday center fielder for the 1995 season. In his new role as the team's primary center fielder, Edmonds also emerged as a formidable power hitter; he only had 29 home runs in his six-year minor league career and five in his true rookie season, leading to him being initially recognized as a contact hitter when coupled with his high batting averages. Edmonds did not hit any home runs through the first 17 games of the 1995 season, but hit six with an .857 slugging percentage in an eight-game stretch from May 15 to May 23. Edmonds received his first All-Star Game selection in 1995 and was batting .291 with 13 home runs and 52 RBIs at the All-Star break. Edmonds finished the 1995 season batting .290 with 33 home runs and 107 RBIs.

Edmonds returned to the Angels in 1996 as one of the team's best all-around hitters. On March 7, he agreed to a four-year, $9.5 million contract extension with the Angels that included a team option in the fifth year. He suffered groin and stomach injuries on May 25, sidelining him for a month. Edmonds returned to the field on June 10 but sprained his thumb the following day, causing him to be out for another month. He returned to action on July 18, going 2-for-5 with a home run against the Seattle Mariners. Edmonds finished the 1996 season batting .304 with 27 home runs and 66 RBIs.

==== 1997–1999: Gold Glove selections ====
Edmonds, along with Tim Salmon, Garret Anderson, and Darin Erstad, comprised a group of four outfielders that emerged as viable options for the Angels in the mid-1990s. This created a dilemma for the team's front office, who sought to have all four players serve as everyday starters. As a result, the Angels traded designated hitter Chili Davis and first baseman J. T. Snow for pitching in the 1996–97 offseason in order to create playing time for all four outfielders. Amid the positional shakeup, Edmonds was able to stay in center field while Erstad moved to first base. Edmonds received recognition for his defensive prowess in 1997, often making highlight reels. During a June 10, 1997, game against the Kansas City Royals, Edmonds ran straight back towards the center field wall of Kauffman Stadium and dove outstretched for a fly ball over his head, making the catch on the warning track. The catch is widely viewed as one of the greatest defensive plays in baseball history, with Joe Posnanski of The Athletic ranking it as the 29th-greatest moment in all of baseball history. In the 1997 season, Edmonds batted .291 and hit 26 home runs with 80 RBIs. Following the season, he received his first career Gold Glove Award.

In September 1998, the division-leading Angels fell behind the Texas Rangers in the standings, ultimately losing the division and missing out on the playoffs. Edmonds, despite batting .340 that month with five home runs and 20 RBIs, was criticized by some teammates for his purported nonchalance towards the Angels' late-season elimination. In an interview, Edmonds said that he wasn't "going to come in the next day and want to kill himself" if the Angels were mathematically eliminated. In 1998, Edmonds played a career-high 154 games, hitting .307 with 25 home runs and 91 RBIs. He received his second career Gold Glove Award.

During spring training in 1999, Edmonds tore the labrum in his right shoulder while lifting weights, aggravating an injury he had been playing through for several years prior. He underwent surgery to correct the injury, sidelining him for the first half of the season. In addition to the deactivating surgery, tensions were also rising in the clubhouse as some teammates were taking exception to Edmonds's alleged nonchalant, dismissive attitude. These factors created doubt that the Angels would bring back Edmonds after the 1999 season. Team newcomer Mo Vaughn, who had yet to share the field with Edmonds, accused him of not accepting responsibility for team struggles. Edmonds returned to the field as a designated hitter on August 2, 1999, going 2-for-4 against the Texas Rangers with a double. He returned to center field on August 7. He finished his abbreviated 1999 season batting .250 with 5 home runs and 23 RBIs in 55 games.

=== St. Louis Cardinals ===
==== 2000–2003: Immediate production ====
On March 23, 2000, the Angels traded Edmonds to the St. Louis Cardinals for second baseman Adam Kennedy and pitcher Kent Bottenfield. Five days prior, Angels general manager Bill Stoneman had told Edmonds that he would not be traded, but plans purportedly changed when St. Louis made Kennedy available.

Edmonds made his Cardinals debut on April 3, going 0-for-3 with 2 walks against the Chicago Cubs. He recorded his first hit, home run, and RBI as a Cardinal the following day. Through his first 50 games, Edmonds batted .371 with 16 home runs and 39 RBIs. He received his second career All-Star selection, starting in the game in place of the injured Ken Griffey Jr., going 1-for-2 with a hit off David Wells. Edmonds finished the year batting .295 with 42 home runs and 108 RBIs. He received his third career Gold Glove Award and finished fourth in National League (NL) Most Valuable Player Award voting. In the postseason, Edmonds batted .361 with 3 home runs and 12 RBIs in 8 games.

In 2001, Edmonds batted .304 with 30 home runs and 110 RBIs. He received his second consecutive Gold Glove Award, the fourth of his career. In the NL Division Series, Edmonds batted .235 with two home runs and three RBIs.

In 2002, Edmonds batted a career-high .311 with 28 home runs and 83 RBIs. He was awarded his third consecutive Gold Glove Award, the fifth of his career. In the 2002 postseason, Edmonds batted .355 with two home runs and six RBIs through eight games.

In 2003, Edmonds received his third career All-Star selection. Through the All-Star break, he batted .303 with 28 home runs and 67 RBIs. Edmonds started in center field in the All-Star game and batted second, going 1-for-2 with a first-inning single off AL starter Esteban Loaiza. Edmonds slumped after the All-Star break, batting .214 with 11 home runs and 22 RBIs. He finished the season batting .275 with 39 home runs and 89 RBIs. He received his fourth consecutive Gold Glove Award, the sixth of his career.

==== 2004–2007: Postseason success ====
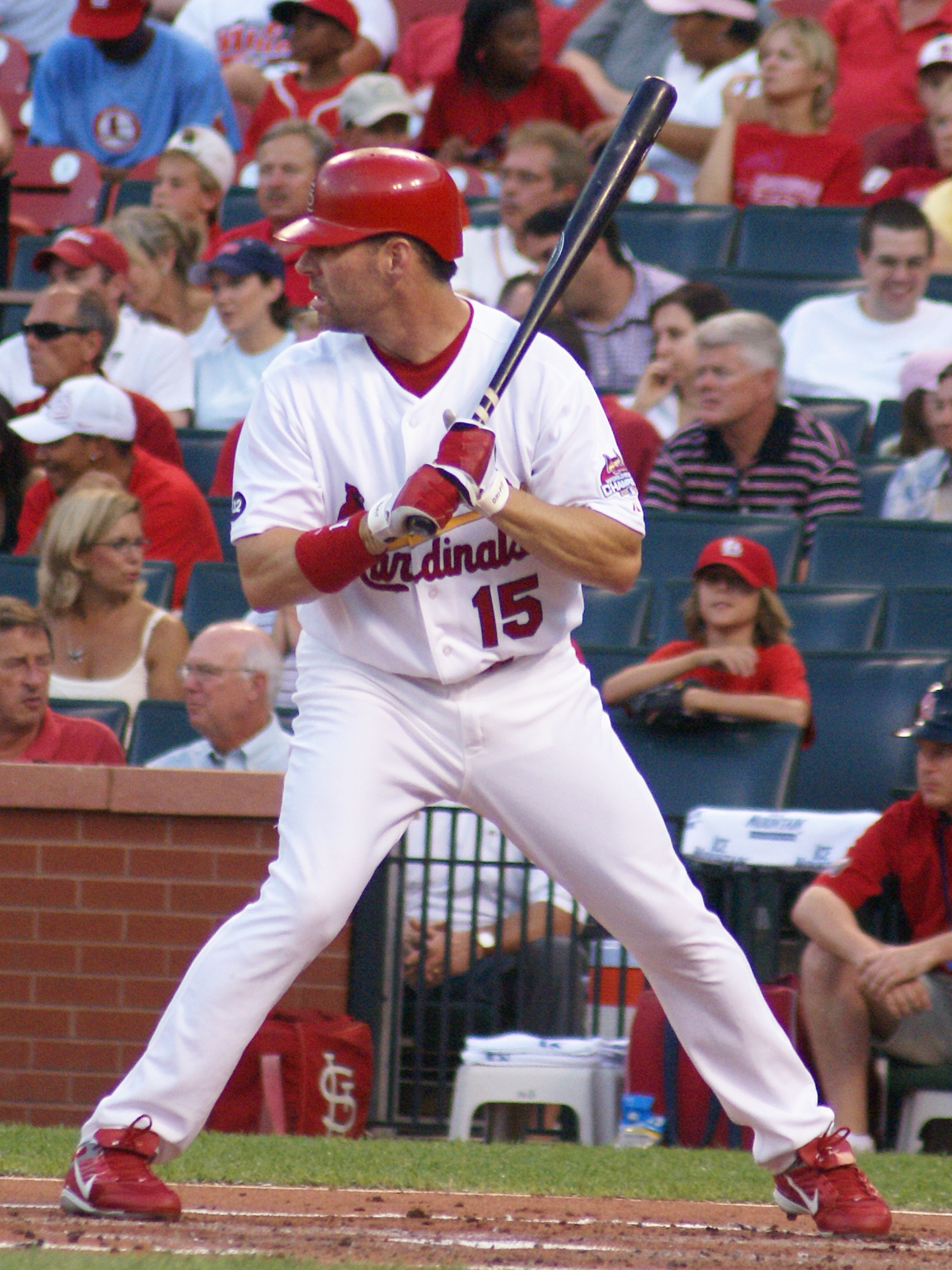
Edmonds batting for the Cardinals in 2007

The 2004 season was among the statistically best for Edmonds. He hit .301, had a .643 slugging percentage, 42 home runs, and 111 RBI; all but batting average were career highs. As a result, he earned a Silver Slugger Award, a Gold Glove Award, and was fifth in the voting for the NL Most Valuable Player Award. During a Chicago Cubs-Cardinals game at Wrigley Field on July 19, pitcher Carlos Zambrano was ejected from the game for throwing at Edmonds. Zambrano screamed at Edmonds as he rounded the bases on a home run, earning Zambrano a five-game suspension. Edmonds, along with Albert Pujols and Scott Rolen, earned the nickname "MV3" for their standout 2004 seasons. Edmonds was on the cover of video game MLB Slugfest in 2004. A defining moment of Edmonds' career came in the NL Championship Series (NLCS), in which Edmonds hit a twelfth-inning home run to win Game 6. In Game 7, Edmonds made a spectacular defensive play in center, helping the Cardinals win the pennant.

In 2005, Edmonds hit .263 with 29 home runs and 89 RBIs, earning his fourth career All-Star selection. During Game 4 of the NLCS, Edmonds was ejected in the eighth inning for arguing a strike call made by home plate umpire Phil Cuzzi. Edmonds later said that he "wasn't trying to show up" Cuzzi and said that Cuzzi responded profanely, a claim that was not contested. In 9 postseason games in 2005, Edmonds batted .267 with a home run, one RBI, and three doubles.

On Mother's Day in 2006, Edmonds was one of more than 50 hitters who used a pink bat to benefit the Susan G. Komen for the Cure foundation. Late in the 2006 season, Edmonds began having trouble with fielding that plagued the rest of his tenure with St. Louis. On June 21, he crashed into the wall of U.S. Cellular Field while playing against the Chicago White Sox trying to rob a home run ball. Intermittent bouts of nausea, dizziness, and blurred vision followed in the next few weeks for him, particularly intensifying on diving attempts. Two months after the crash, he was diagnosed with post-concussion syndrome. In the 2006 postseason, Edmonds helped the St. Louis Cardinals win their first World Series title since 1982 while having 13 hits in the postseason with two home runs while batting in all 16 games.

He batted .252 in 117 games in 2007 while hitting 12 home runs with 53 runs batted in.

=== Later career ===
==== 2008–2009: Padres, Cubs, and off-year ====
On December 14, 2007, the Cardinals traded Edmonds to the San Diego Padres in exchange for prospect David Freese. As part of the deal, the Cardinals also agreed to pay part of Edmonds's 2008 salary. Edmonds' 241 home runs with the Cardinals are the fourth-most in franchise history. On May 9, 2008, the Padres released him after hitting only .178 with one home run in 90 at-bats.

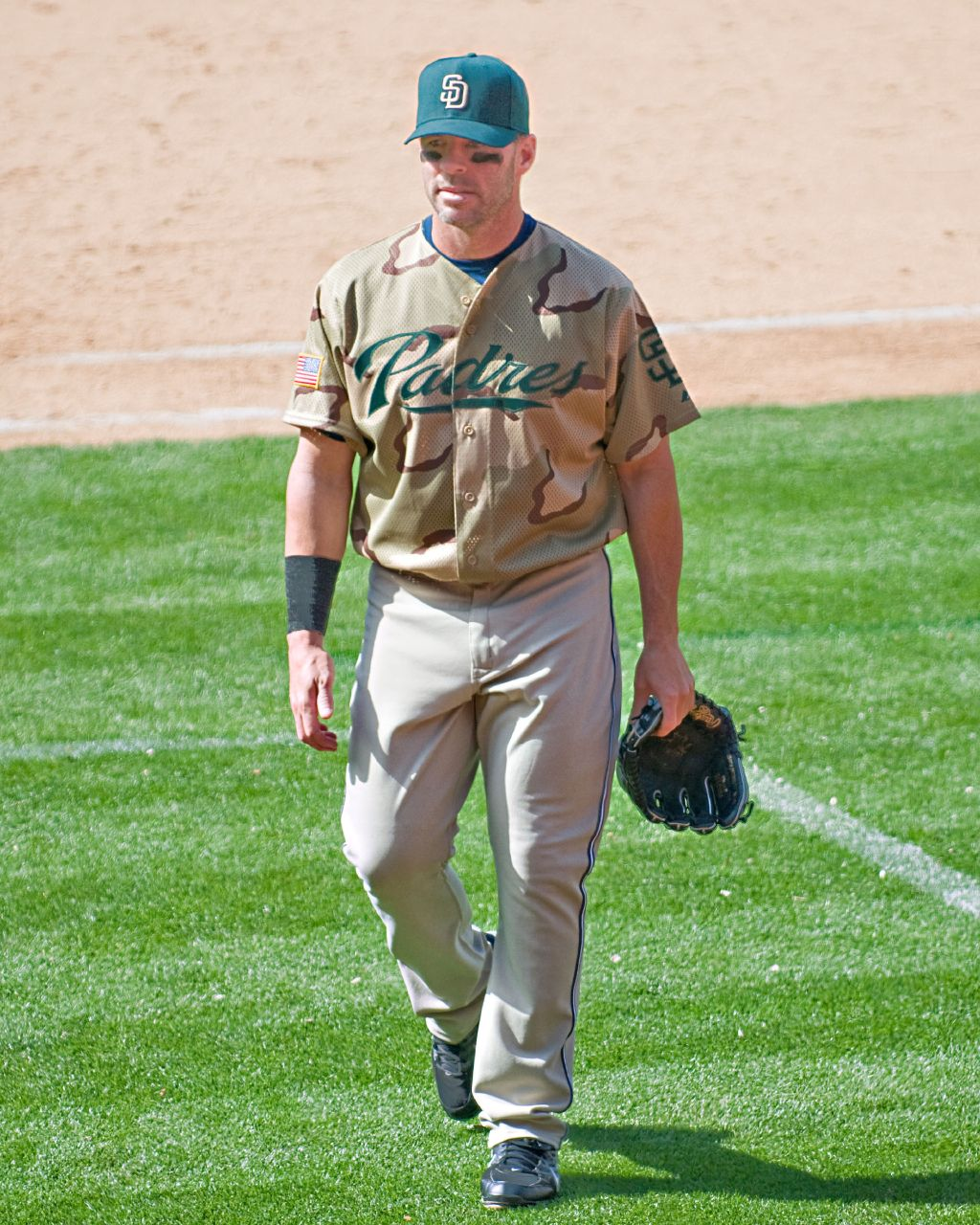
Edmonds with the San Diego Padres in 2008

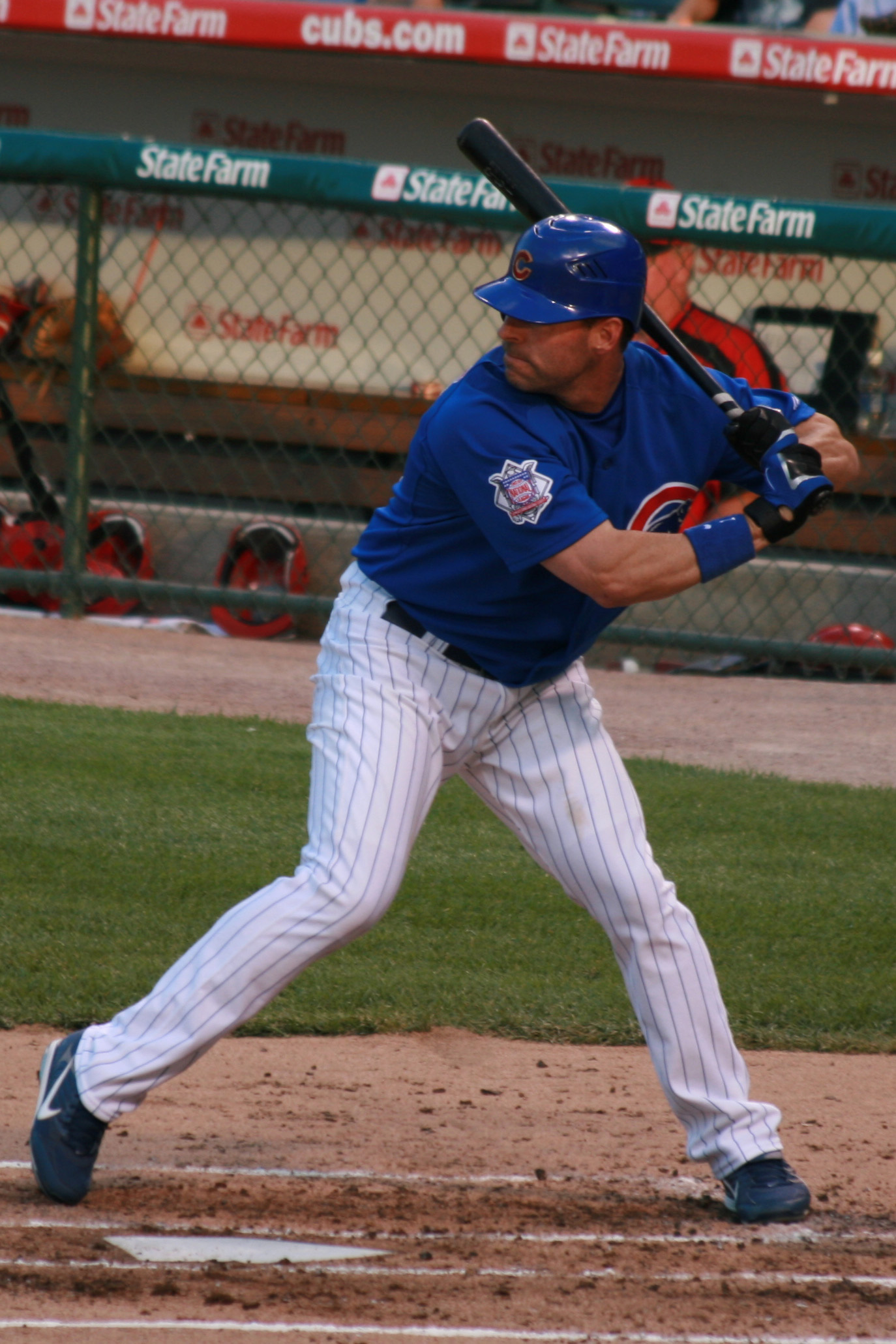
Edmonds batting for the Chicago Cubs in 2008.

On May 14, 2008, the Chicago Cubs, in need of a left-handed bat, signed Edmonds to a one-year contract of which the Cubs were only responsible for the league minimum. He started the next day against his former team, the Padres, and went 1-for-4. Edmonds was not well-received initially by the fans in Chicago, but after joining the Cubs, he hit over .300 with eight home runs in his first six weeks. On June 21, Edmonds hit two home runs in the fourth inning against the Chicago White Sox.

Edmonds did not play in 2009 because he did not receive what he considered a good offer. In January 2010, he announced his intention to return to the majors, saying, "Last year was a mistake. I should have played somewhere."

==== 2010–2011: Return and retirement ====
On January 28, 2010, Edmonds signed a minor league deal with the Milwaukee Brewers. The Brewers added him to the major league roster on March 25.

On August 9, Edmonds was traded to the Cincinnati Reds in exchange for Chris Dickerson. Both Edmonds and Dickerson had to clear waivers because the non-waiver trade deadline had already passed. In 86 total games, he batted .276 with eleven home runs. He hit a home run on September 21 but immediately left the game due to injury. It ended up being the final at-bat in his career.

On February 4, 2011, Edmonds signed a minor league contract with the St. Louis Cardinals; however, after continuing symptoms from a strained Achilles tendon suffered during the 2010 season, Edmonds officially announced his retirement from baseball on February 18.

== Broadcasting career ==
On March 14, 2013, Fox Sports Midwest announced that it had hired Edmonds to join its St. Louis Cardinals broadcasting crew. Edmonds initially served as an analyst during Cardinals Live pre-game and post-game broadcasts. He replaced Cal Eldred, a former Cardinals pitcher who had worked for Fox Sports Midwest for four years before becoming a special assistant in the Cardinals organization. Beginning in 2016, Edmonds alternated between the Cardinals Live studio role and serving as a color commentator in the booth for certain games. Edmonds left the Cardinals broadcast team prior to the 2025 season.

Edmonds has expressed a desire to one day become part of the Cardinals ownership group.

== Personal life ==
Edmonds has two daughters from his first marriage, to Lee Ann Horton, who died of cancer in 2015.

He has a son and a daughter from his second marriage, which lasted from 2008 to 2014.

Edmonds married Meghan O'Toole King on October 24, 2014. She joined the cast of The Real Housewives of Orange County in 2015; Edmonds appeared on the show. They welcomed a daughter on Thanksgiving Day 2016 and twin boys on June 5, 2018. On October 25, 2019, the day after their fifth wedding anniversary, Edmonds filed for divorce.

Edmonds married again in 2022. He and his family live in Frontenac, Missouri, a suburb of St. Louis.

=== Business ventures ===
Edmonds opened several restaurants with business partner Mark Winfield. The pair opened their first restaurant in 2007, while Edmonds was still playing for the Cardinals, called Jim Edmonds 15 Steakhouse. It closed in September 2013. Within a few months, they opened a new restaurant in the space called The Precinct; it would close in May 2015. In 2015, they opened a BBQ-style restaurant called Winfield's Gathering Place in Kirkwood, Missouri; it closed on July 2, 2016.

== Awards ==
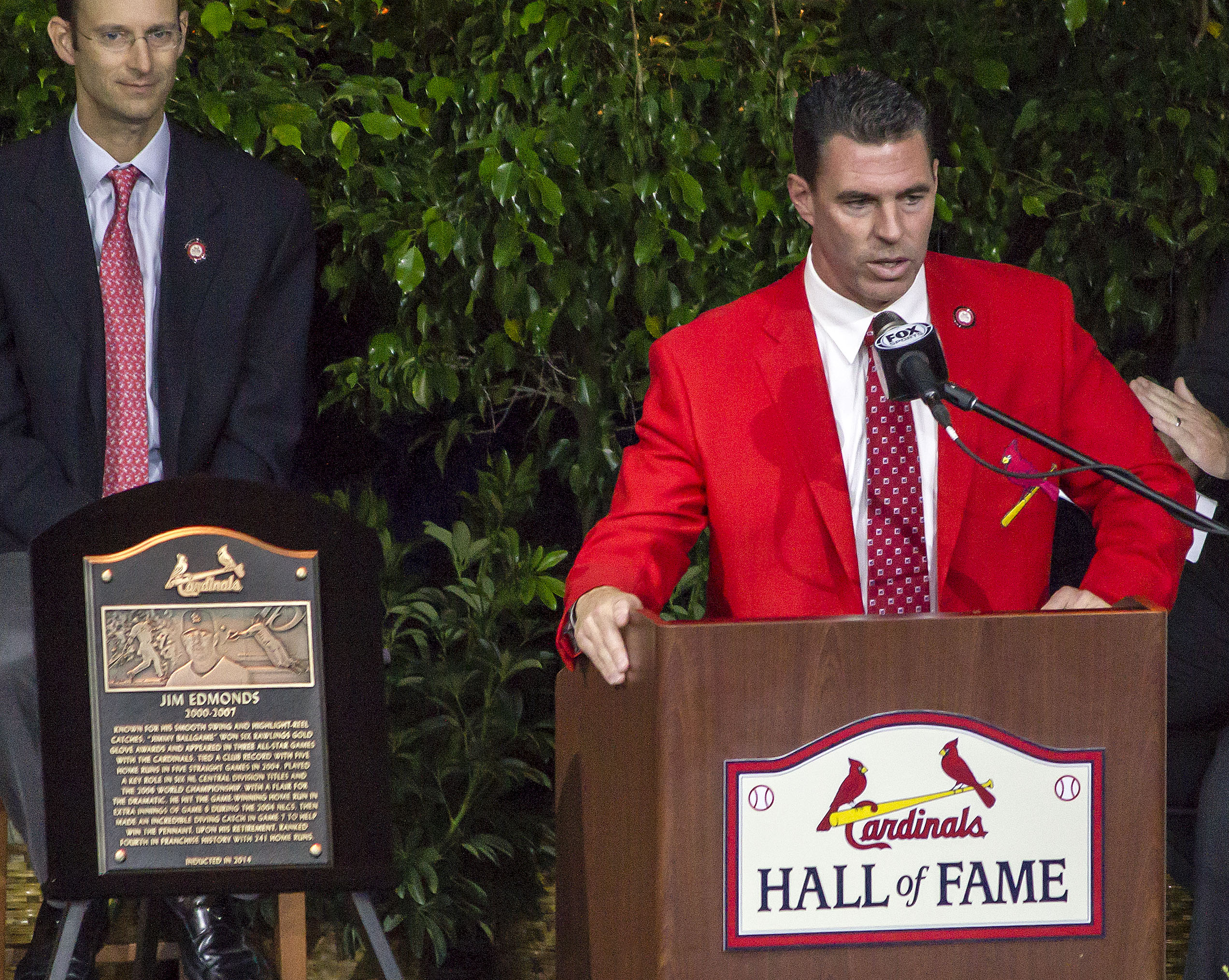
Edmonds' Cardinals Hall of Fame speech

Edmonds' fielding ability has earned him recognition from major league coaches and managers, who voted him a Gold Glove winner eight times in nine seasons from 1997 to 2005.

ESPN's Rob Neyer listed Edmonds as No. 12 of the top 100 players of the first decade of the 21st century due to his productivity at the plate and gold-glove skills in center field.

On August 8, 2014, Edmonds was inducted into the St. Louis Cardinals Hall of Fame. He was announced as a candidate for the National Baseball Hall of Fame and Museum on November 9, 2015, but was removed from the ballot on January 6, 2016, after only receiving 2.5% of the vote in his first year of eligibility.

== See also ==
- List of Major League Baseball career assists as a center fielder leaders
- List of Major League Baseball career extra base hits leaders
- List of Major League Baseball career fielding errors as a center fielder leaders
- List of Major League Baseball career home run leaders
- List of Major League Baseball career OPS leaders
- List of Major League Baseball career putouts as a center fielder leaders
- List of Major League Baseball career slugging percentage leaders
- List of Major League Baseball career strikeouts by batters leaders
- Los Angeles Angels award winners and league leaders
- St. Louis Cardinals award winners and league leaders

Awards and achievements
Preceded by Jim Thome	National League Player of the Month; July 2004	Succeeded by Barry Bonds
