= 2005 National League Championship Series =

Major League Baseball playoff series

Team (Wins)	Managers	Season
Houston Astros (4)	Phil Garner	89–73 (.549), GB: 11
St. Louis Cardinals (2)	Tony La Russa	100–62 (.617), GA: 11
- Dates: October 12–19
- MVP: Roy Oswalt (Houston)
- Umpires: Tim McClelland, Greg Gibson, Wally Bell, Phil Cuzzi, Larry Poncino, Gerry Davis

Broadcast
- Television: Fox
- TV announcers: Thom Brennaman, Steve Lyons, Bob Brenly, and Kenny Albert
- Radio: ESPN
- Radio announcers: Dan Shulman and Dave Campbell
- NLDS: St. Louis Cardinals over San Diego Padres (3–0); Houston Astros over Atlanta Braves (3–1)

The 2005 National League Championship Series (NLCS) was a best-of-seven playoff in Major League Baseball's 2005 postseason pitting the defending National League champion and overall #1 seeded St. Louis Cardinals and the fourth-seeded Houston Astros for the National League pennant. The Cardinals, by virtue of having the best record in the National League, had the home-field advantage.

This was a rematch of the 2004 NLCS. The Astros won the series four games to two and became the National League champions; they advanced to face the American League champion Chicago White Sox in the 2005 World Series, which the White Sox won in a four-game sweep.

St. Louis manager Tony La Russa, who won AL pennants with the Oakland Athletics in 1988–89–90 and the NL flag in 2004, fell short in his bid to become the first manager in history to win multiple pennants in both major leagues, although he did so in 2006 and again in 2011. The NLCS also closed with the last game ever played at St. Louis' Busch Stadium (II), which the Cardinals departed after 40 seasons.

== Summary ==
=== St. Louis Cardinals vs. Houston Astros ===
Houston won the series, 4–2.

Game	Date	Score	Location	Time	Attendance
1	October 12	Houston Astros – 3, St. Louis Cardinals – 5	Busch Stadium (II)	2:29	52,332
2	October 13	Houston Astros – 4, St. Louis Cardinals – 1	Busch Stadium (II)	3:03	52,358
3	October 15	St. Louis Cardinals – 3, Houston Astros – 4	Minute Maid Park	3:00	42,823
4	October 16	St. Louis Cardinals – 1, Houston Astros – 2	Minute Maid Park	3:11	43,010
5	October 17	St. Louis Cardinals – 5, Houston Astros – 4	Minute Maid Park	3:19	43,470
6	October 19	Houston Astros – 5, St. Louis Cardinals – 1	Busch Stadium (II)	2:53	52,438

== Game summaries ==
=== Game 1 ===
October 12, 2005 7:29 pm (CDT) at Busch Stadium (II) in St. Louis, Missouri 70 °F (21 °C), clear
Team	1	2	3	4	5	6	7	8	9	R	H	E
Houston	0	0	0	0	0	0	2	0	1	3	7	0
St. Louis	2	1	0	0	2	0	0	0	X	5	8	1
WP: Chris Carpenter (1–0) LP: Andy Pettitte (0–1) Sv: Jason Isringhausen (1); Home runs: HOU: Chris Burke (1); STL: Reggie Sanders (1); Attendance: 52,332; Boxscore

The Cardinals struck first in Game 1 when David Eckstein hit a leadoff single in the first off of starter Andy Pettitte, who was struck by a batted ball during batting practice but made the start as scheduled, then Reggie Sanders's home run two outs later put them up 2−0. Mark Grudzielanek singled to lead off the second, moved to third on Abraham Nunez's single one out later, and scored on Chris Carpenter's sacrifice bunt. In the fifth, Nunez again hit a leadoff single, moved to second on a sacrifice bunt, and scored on Eckstein's single with Eckstein reaching second on right fielder Jason Lane's throw to home. One out later, Albert Pujols's RBI single made it 5−0 Cardinals. Carpenter pitched six shutout innings before pinch hitter Chris Burke's two-run home run put the Astros on the board in the seventh. Brad Ausmus's sacrifice fly in the ninth off of Jason Isringhausen made it 5−3 Cardinals before pinch hitter Jose Vizcaino grounded out to end the game as the Cardinals went up 1−0 in the series.

=== Game 2 ===
October 13, 2005 7:29 pm (CDT) at Busch Stadium (II) in St. Louis, Missouri 71 °F (22 °C), mostly cloudy
Team	1	2	3	4	5	6	7	8	9	R	H	E
Houston	0	1	0	0	1	0	0	2	0	4	11	1
St. Louis	0	0	0	0	0	1	0	0	0	1	6	0
WP: Roy Oswalt (1–0) LP: Mark Mulder (0–1) Sv: Brad Lidge (1); Home runs: HOU: None; STL: Albert Pujols (1); Attendance: 52,358; Boxscore

The Astros struck first in Game 2 when Chris Burke tripled with one out in the second and scored on a passed ball by starter Mark Mulder. In the fifth, Brad Ausmus hit a leadoff double, moved to third on Roy Oswalt's sacrifice bunt and scored on Craig Biggio's ground out. Albert Pujols's leadoff home run off of Oswalt in the sixth put the Cardinals on the board, but they would get nothing more. The Astros scored two insurance runs in the eighth off of Julián Tavárez on Chris Burke's RBI single that scored Lance Berkman from third. followed by Adam Everett's RBI triple. Brad Lidge pitched two shutout innings for the save as the Astros' 4−1 win tied the series at 1−1 heading to Houston.

=== Game 3 ===
October 15, 2005 3:30 pm (CDT) at Minute Maid Park in Houston, Texas 73 °F (23 °C), roof closed
Team	1	2	3	4	5	6	7	8	9	R	H	E
St. Louis	0	0	0	0	1	1	0	0	1	3	7	1
Houston	0	0	0	2	0	2	0	0	X	4	11	0
WP: Roger Clemens (1–0) LP: Matt Morris (0–1) Sv: Brad Lidge (2); Home runs: STL: None; HOU: Mike Lamb (1); Attendance: 42,823; Boxscore

In Game 3, Cardinals' starter Matt Morris pitched three shutout innings before walking Morgan Ensberg to lead off the fourth, then Mike Lamb's home run put the Astros up 2−0. In the fifth, the Astros' Roger Clemens allowed back-to-back leadoff singles to Yadier Molina and Abraham Nunez. Morris's sacrifice bunt moved them up one base each before David Eckstein's sacrifice fly put the Cardinals on the board. Clemens again allowed back-to-back leadoff singles next inning to Albert Pujols and Jim Edmonds before Larry Walker's sacrifice fly tied the game. In the bottom of the inning, Lamb hit a one-out double and scored on Jason Lane's single. After Brad Ausmus singled, Brad Thompson relieved Morris and Adam Everett hit into a fielder's choice that allowed Lane to score to put the Astros up 4−2. Chad Qualls pitched two hitless innings before Brad Lidge retired the first two batters in the ninth and walked John Rodriguez. Rodriguez then moved to second on defensive indifference before scoring on John Mabry's double, which was the first run allowed by Lidge against the Cardinals since May 29, 2003. However, he got the next batter to fly out to center to give the Astros a 2–1 series lead. It was the 5th League Championship Series game won by Clemens in his career and his 12th overall postseason game win.

=== Game 4 ===
October 16, 2005 3:46 pm (CDT) at Minute Maid Park in Houston, Texas 73 °F (23 °C), roof closed
Team	1	2	3	4	5	6	7	8	9	R	H	E
St. Louis	0	0	0	1	0	0	0	0	0	1	5	1
Houston	0	0	0	1	0	0	1	0	X	2	6	0
WP: Chad Qualls (1–0) LP: Jason Marquis (0–1) Sv: Brad Lidge (3); Home runs: STL: None; HOU: Jason Lane (1); Attendance: 43,010; Boxscore

Brandon Backe provided a strong outing, and the Astro bullpen continued its strong performance. The Cardinals struck first in the fourth when David Eckstein drew a leadoff walk, moved to third on Jim Edmonds's double, and scored on Albert Pujols's sacrifice fly, but the Astros tied in the bottom of the inning on Jason Lane's home run off of Jeff Suppan. The Astros loaded the bases in the seventh off of Jason Marquis on two walks and an error when Morgan Ensberg's sacrifice fly put them up 2−1. Tony La Russa and Jim Edmonds were both ejected for arguing balls and strikes on separate instances—LaRussa in the bottom of the seventh, Edmonds in the top of the eighth, at a key moment. Edmonds's ejection came with a 3–2 count, two outs, and a runner on base. Edmonds was replaced by pinch hitter John Rodríguez, who flied out to deep center field to end the scoring threat. The Cardinals once again had an opportunity to tie the game or take the lead in the ninth inning against closer Brad Lidge. Albert Pujols and Larry Walker led off the inning with back-to-back singles, putting runners at first and third base with no outs. Reggie Sanders grounded to third; Pujols went home on contact and was thrown out at the plate. Larry Walker advanced to third when the Astros failed to call timeout after the play at the plate. John Mabry ended the threat by grounding into a double play. La Russa's ejection marked the first time a manager was ejected from a postseason game since 1998, when Mike Hargrove was thrown out of a game between his Cleveland Indians and the New York Yankees. Houston was one game away from the franchise's first visit to the World Series after a 2–1 Game 4 win.

=== Game 5 ===
October 17, 2005 7:29 pm (CDT) at Minute Maid Park in Houston, Texas 73 °F (23 °C), roof closed
Team	1	2	3	4	5	6	7	8	9	R	H	E
St. Louis	0	0	2	0	0	0	0	0	3	5	9	1
Houston	0	1	0	0	0	0	3	0	0	4	9	2
WP: Jason Isringhausen (1–0) LP: Brad Lidge (0–1); Home runs: STL: Albert Pujols (2); HOU: Lance Berkman (1); Attendance: 43,470; Boxscore

The Astros struck first in Game 5 on Craig Biggio's RBI single in the second off of starter Chris Carpenter, but the Cardinals loaded the bases on two hits and a walk off of Andy Pettitte when Mark Grudzielanek's two-run single put them up 2–1. Lance Berkman gave excited Astros fans a 4–2 lead with one swing on a pitch from Carpenter in the bottom of the seventh inning. The Astros were one strike away from claiming their first National League pennant and trip to the Fall Classic before David Eckstein singled with no one on base, Jim Edmonds walked, and Albert Pujols hit a dramatic, towering three-run home run off Astros closer Brad Lidge that bounced off the side of the closed Minute Maid Park roof before landing on the railroad tracks in left field, stunning the crowd into silence. The home run gave the Cardinals a 5–4 lead in the top of the ninth inning. Jason Isringhausen retired the Astros in order in the bottom of the inning. The Cardinals guaranteed that another game would be played at historic Busch Stadium (II). The win also broke the Cardinals' seven-game losing streak in road NLCS games. The Astros' series lead was trimmed to 3–2.

=== Game 6 ===
October 19, 2005 7:29 pm (CDT) at Busch Stadium (II) in St. Louis, Missouri 71 °F (22 °C), mostly cloudy
Team	1	2	3	4	5	6	7	8	9	R	H	E
Houston	0	0	2	1	0	1	1	0	0	5	11	0
St. Louis	0	0	0	0	1	0	0	0	0	1	4	1
WP: Roy Oswalt (2–0) LP: Mark Mulder (0–2); Home runs: HOU: Jason Lane (2); STL: None; Attendance: 52,438; Boxscore

The Astros were trying to shake off the effects of the loss in Game 5, which was the fifth time in their history that they had lost a close-out game in the NLCS (1980 and 2004 were the other two). At the end of the game, it ended with the Astros having won their first National League pennant in 44 seasons of existence with a decisive 5–1 win over the Cardinals. The Astros scored a run in the third when the Cardinals' Mark Mulder threw a wild pitch to Craig Biggio with runners on second and third, then Biggio's RBI single scored another. Jason Lane's home run in the fourth put them up 3−0. Roy Oswalt pitched seven strong innings, allowing only a sacrifice fly to John Rodriguez in the fifth. The Astros scored one run in the sixth on Adam Everett's sacrifice bunt off of Jason Marquis and another in the seventh on Morgan Ensberg's RBI single off of Julián Tavárez. This was the final game at Busch Stadium (II). This would also be the Astros' last postseason win as a member of the NL, as they would get swept in the World Series, move to the AL in 2013, and would not win another postseason game until the 2015 American League Wild Card Game.

Roy Oswalt was named the series MVP. In two starts, he went 2–0 with a 1.29 ERA in fourteen innings.

== Composite box ==
2005 NLCS (4–2): Houston Astros over St. Louis Cardinals

Team	1	2	3	4	5	6	7	8	9	R	H	E
Houston Astros	0	2	2	4	1	3	7	2	1	22	55	3
St. Louis Cardinals	2	1	2	1	4	2	0	0	4	16	39	5
Total attendance: 286,431 Average attendance: 47,739

== Aftermath ==
A close division title race in 2006 would represent unofficial end of the Astros and Cardinals rivalry that developed when the Astros moved to the National League Central in 1994. From 1996 to 2006, either the St. Louis Cardinals or the Houston Astros won the National League Central every year, except for 2003. Both teams also played each other in dramatic and compelling National League Championship Series in 2004 and 2005.

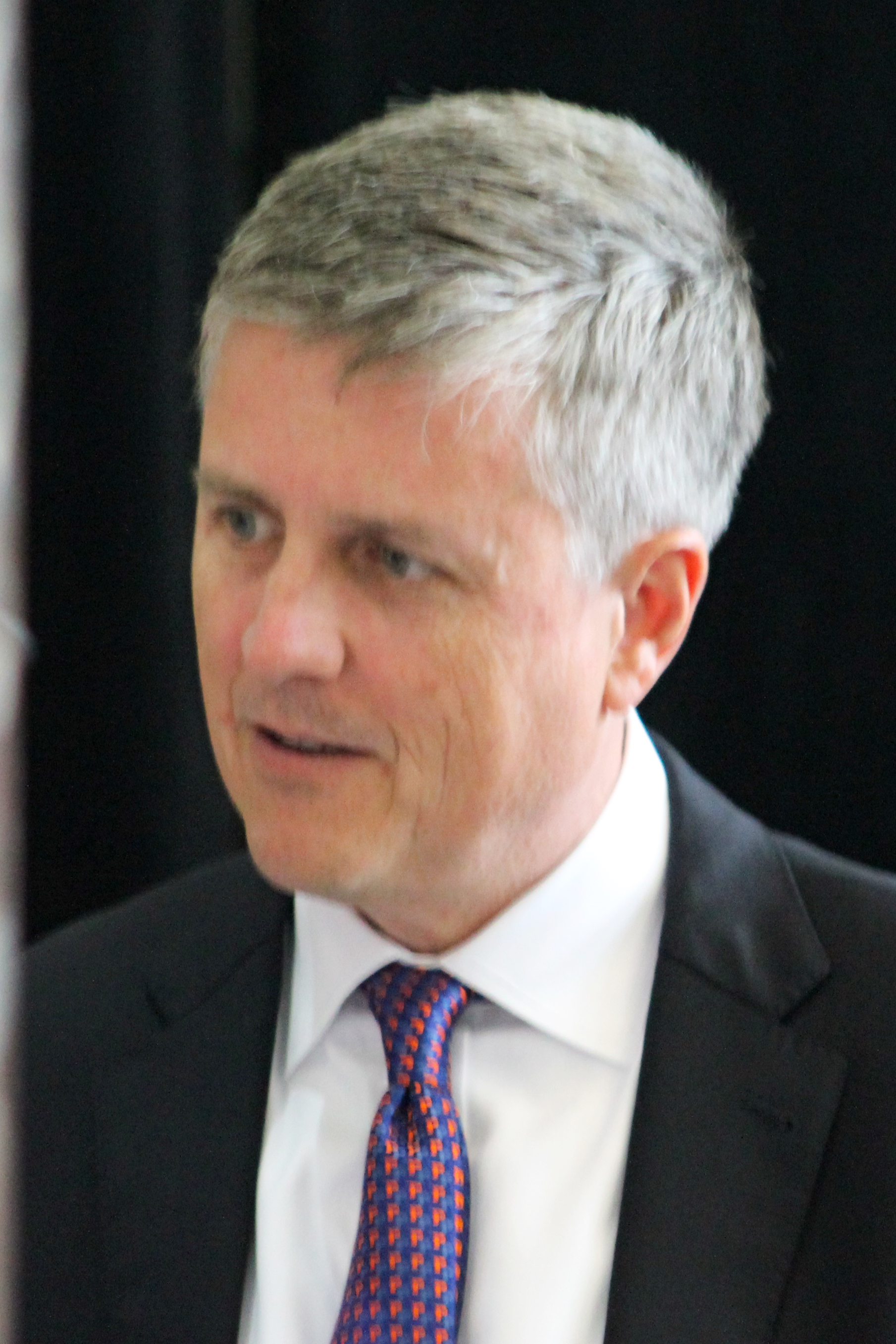
Jeff Luhnow, an important figure in assembling the Cardinals’ and Astros’, rosters post-2005

After the 2006 season, both teams had older rosters, but went in opposite directions. The Astros embarked on a long re-build and eventually moved from the National League to the American League after the 2012 season. To get themselves on the winning track again, the Astros hired Cardinals farm director Jeff Luhnow to be the team's general manager during the 2011-2012 off-season. The Astros would make the playoffs again in 2015 and finally win their first World Series in franchise history in 2017. However, Luhnow's practices and ethics were called into question almost immediately after winning the World Series. In 2018, Luhnow came under fire when he traded for Roberto Osuna, who was serving a suspension for 75 games for domestic assault. During the 2018 post-season, another controversial incident popped up, as an Astros' intern named Kyle McLaughlin was found taking cell phone video of the Indians' dugout during the Astros' and Indians' ALDS matchup. In regards to Osuna, Luhnow's assistant, Brandon Taubman, made inappropriate and sexist remarks to female reporters after the Astros clinched the 2019 pennant. Things came to a head on January 13, 2020, when Luhnow and A. J. Hinch (Houston's on field manager) were suspended for the entire 2020 season by MLB's commissioner Rob Manfred for failing to prevent the Astros from cheating by electronically stealing signs during the 2017 and 2018 seasons. Manfred harshly criticized the culture of the Astros' baseball operations department, saying that its emphasis on "results over other considerations" fostered an environment that made it possible for the sign stealing to continue for as long as it did. With a new manager in Dusty Baker and general manager in James Click, the Astros would reach the American League Championship Series in 2020, 2021, and 2022 (continuing the run of the previous three seasons to become the first American League team to reach the ALCS six years in a row), reaching the World Series twice and winning it all in 2022. After winning a postseason only three times while in the National League (1962-2012), they won a postseason series fourteen times from 2015 to 2022, four more postseason wins than the next closest team, the Los Angeles Dodgers, during this stretch.

The Cardinals would win the World Series in 2006, ending a 24-year title drought, and would also continuously be championship contenders in the subsequent years afterwards by drafting and developing well. The Cardinals 2009 draft, which was overseen by future Astros’ GM Jeff Luhnow, saw them take key contributors such as Shelby Miller, Joe Kelly, Matt Carpenter, Trevor Rosenthal, and Matt Adams. Sports Illustrated called their 2009 draft one of the most celebrated drafts in recent memory. Because of their 2009 draft, the Cardinals never went through a long downturn of bad baseball like the Astros did. They would make five straight postseason appearances from 2011-2015, which included four straight NLCS appearances from 2011 to 2014, and win another World Series in 2011.

On the 2011 Cardinals championship team was former Astros stalwart Lance Berkman, who had a career rebirth upon signing with the Cardinals in 2010. In 2011, Berkman was an All-Star and the National League Comeback Player of the Year. Berkman played a key part in the Cardinals winning the 2011 World Series, hitting a game-tying single in the bottom of the tenth inning of Game 6, with the Cardinals just one strike away from elimination. After he retired in 2013, Berkman was inducted into the Houston Astros Hall of Fame.

While the rivalry on the field cooled off after 2005–2006, and died when the Astros moved to the American League, there was still bad blood between the teams' front offices due to the Astros hiring Jeff Luhnow away from the Cardinals in 2011. A former Luhnow assistant named Chris Correa suspected former co-workers of taking intellectual property developed while with St. Louis with them to their new employer in Houston. Using passwords provided when the ex-employees turned in their Cardinals-issued computers, Correa hacked Houston's internal systems and found what he apparently believed was compelling evidence to support his concern. Correa later testified under oath that he came forward to Cardinals colleagues with his discovery, but the organization chose not to press the matter, with chairman Bill DeWitt Jr. later confirming the Cardinals' decision. Correa, however, continued to access Houston's database and repeatedly gathered information from Houston about players, including scouting reports, medical records and projected bonuses, which he used directly in the execution of his job with the Cardinals. Eventually Correa was caught in 2014 after he tried to anonymously leak the Astros' trade discussions and other confidential information to Deadspin.com in hopes to embarrass his former co-workers. Instead, in July 2016, Correa was sentenced to 46 months in prison for hacking Houston's database. MLB ordered the Cardinals to pay $2 million in damages to the Astros, and surrender to Houston their two top remaining picks in the 2017 amateur draft, #56 and #75 overall. Correa also received a lifetime ban from baseball.
