= Friedrich Curtius =

German football official

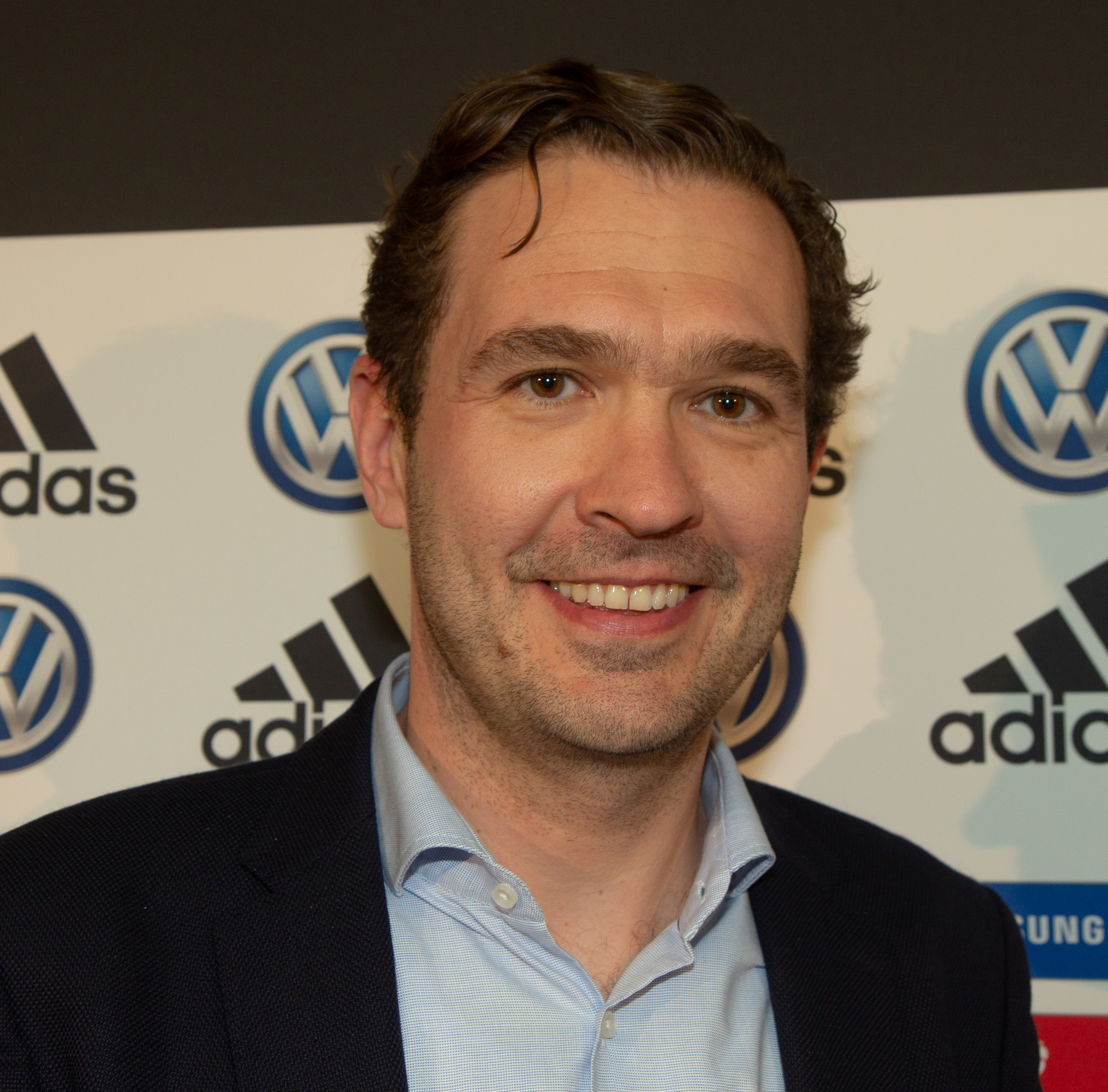
- Born: 1976 (age 49–50)
- Occupation: Jurist
- Title: Secretary-General of the German Football Association
- Term: 2016–2021
- Predecessor: Helmut Sandrock (2012–2016)

Friedrich Curtius (born 1976) is a German football official.

Curtius studied jurisprudence in Heidelberg and received his doctorate. In 2006, he came to the German Football Association (German: Deutscher Fussball-Bund, DFB). In 2007, he was a speaker at the General Secretariat, from 2008 Head of Office of the Secretary General and from 2012, head of the DFB–Presidential Offices.

Curtius was appointed as successor to Helmut Sandrock Secretary-General of the DFB, in March 2016. He stepped down from this role in May 2021 alongside Fritz Keller owing to inappropriate comments.
