= Phil Cuzzi =

American baseball umpire (born 1955)

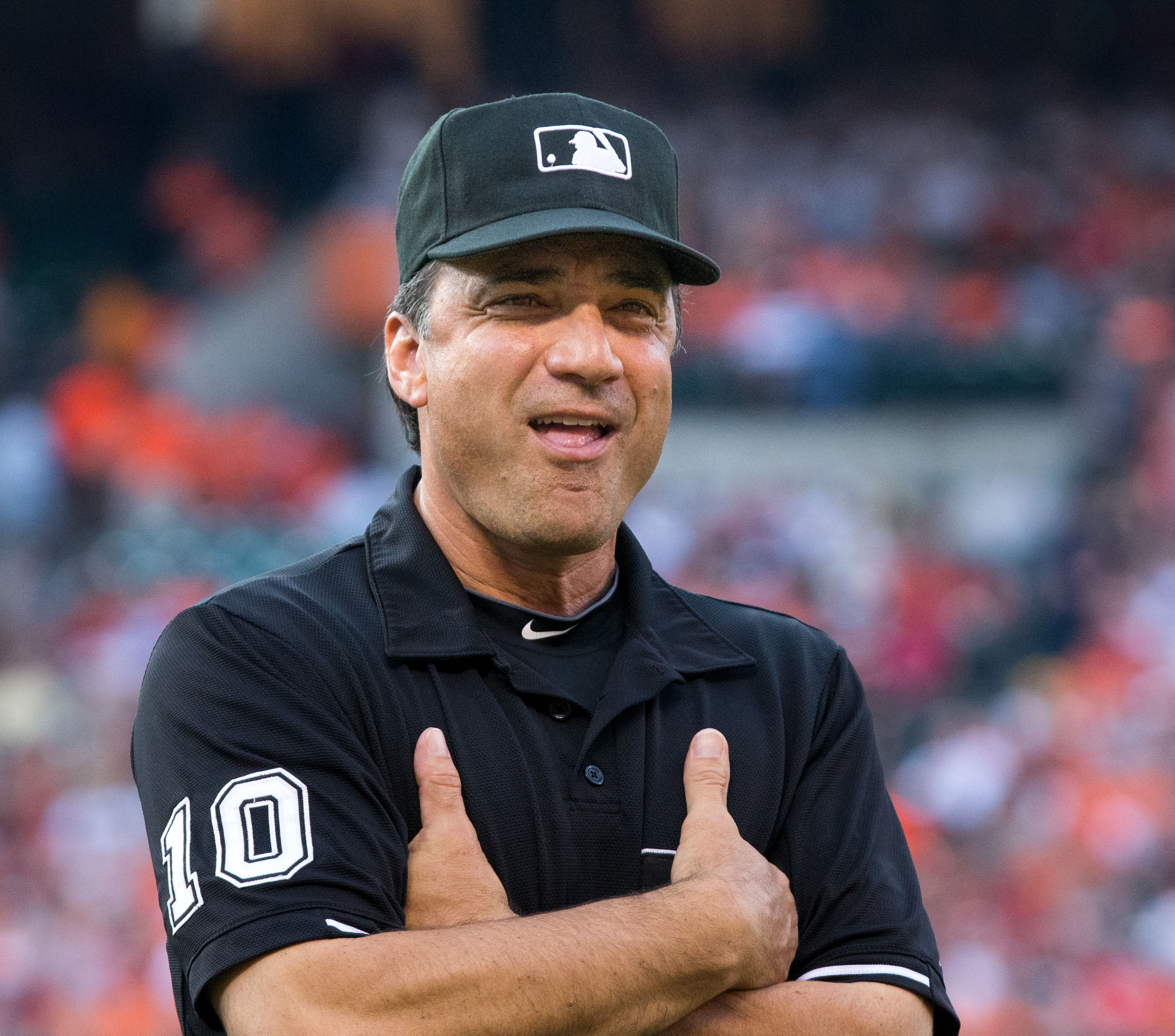
- Cuzzi in 2013
- Umpire
- Born: August 29, 1955 (age 70); Newark, New Jersey, U.S.

MLB debut
- June 4, 1991

Last appearance
- September 28, 2025

Career highlights and awards
- Special Assignments: League Championship Series (2005, 2014, 2019); Division Series (2003, 2004, 2009, 2012, 2015, 2016, 2017); World Series (2017); Wild Card Games/Series (2013, 2024); All-Star Games (2008, 2019)

Philip Cuzzi (born August 29, 1955) is an American former professional baseball umpire in Major League Baseball (MLB). He worked as a reserve umpire in the National League (NL) from 1991 to 1993 and returned in 1999. From 2000-2025, he worked in both leagues. During his final season in 2025, he became the oldest umpire in major league history. Cuzzi announced his retirement from umpiring on February 22, 2026.

== Career ==
=== Minor league umpiring ===
Cuzzi appeared in the New York–Penn League, Carolina League, South Atlantic League, Southern League, Triple-A Alliance, International League, American Association, Florida State League, and Eastern League before his promotion to the major leagues.

=== Major league career ===
Cuzzi made his major league debut on June 4, 1991, umpiring at first base in an 11-inning game between the St. Louis Cardinals and Los Angeles Dodgers. From 1991 through 1993, Cuzzi umpired a total of 71 National League games.

Cuzzi's umpiring career temporarily came to a halt in 1993. He had advanced to Class AAA baseball and served as an MLB reserve umpire. However, although he had done well, by 1993 there were no full-time major league slots for him, and he was released. Cuzzi subsequently worked as a substitute teacher and bartender. While working at a hotel bar in 1996, he had a chance meeting with NL president Len Coleman, who allowed him to resume umpiring if he would work his way back up from the low minor leagues.

In 1999, Cuzzi returned to the NL, working 49 games. He was promoted to the full-time major league staff in 2000. On February 20, 2026, Major League Baseball announced that Cuzzi had retired.

==== Notable games ====
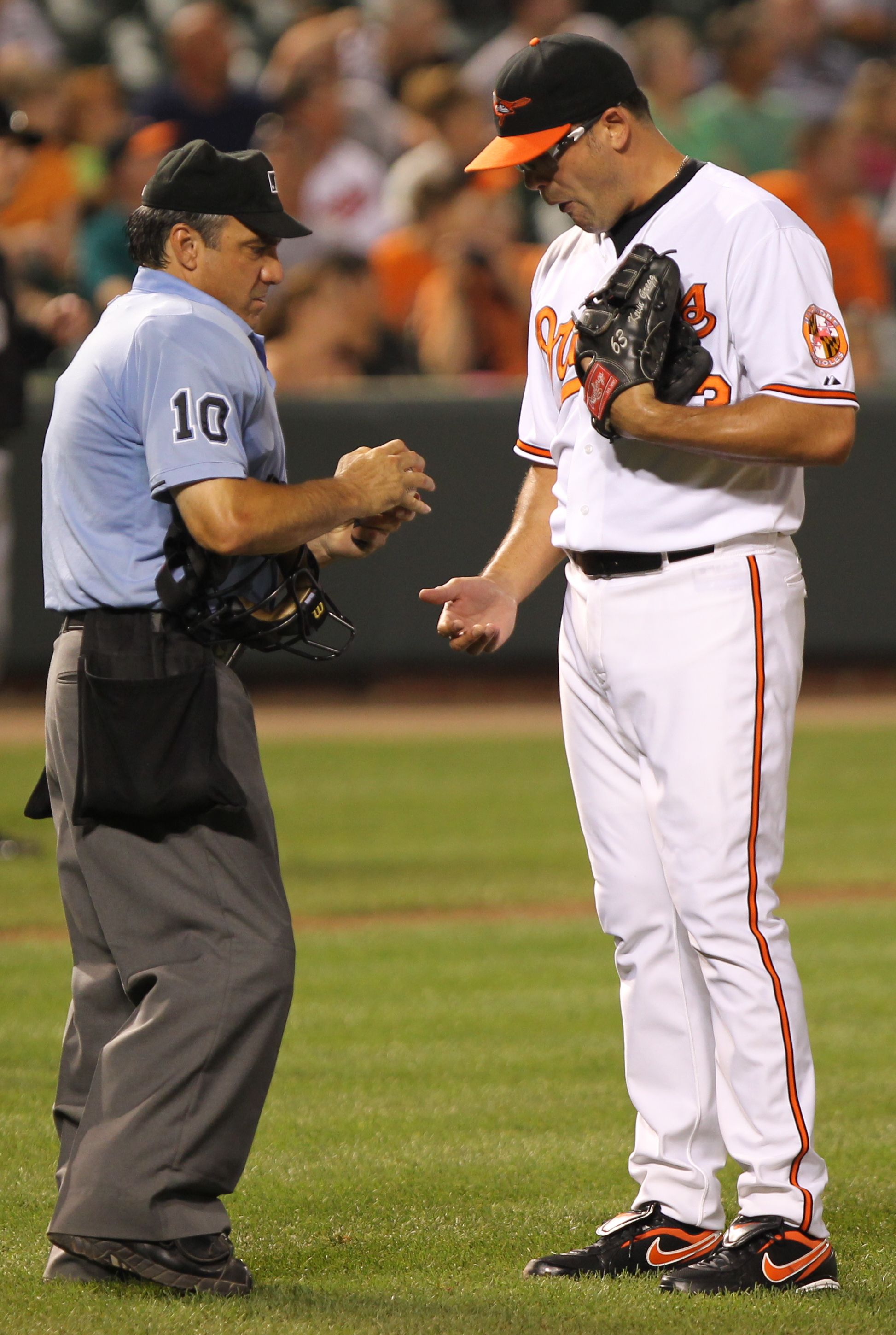
Cuzzi with Kevin Gregg in 2011

Cuzzi has worked the Wild Card Game in 2013 and the Division Series in 2003, 2004, 2009, 2012, 2015, and 2016. He has umpired in the National League Championship Series in 2005, 2014 and 2019. Cuzzi was also the plate umpire for Game 1 of the 2017 World Series. He also worked the 2008 All-Star Game at Yankee Stadium and the 2019 All-Star Game at Progressive Field in Cleveland. In Game 1 of the 2015 National League Division Series between the Chicago Cubs and St. Louis Cardinals, Cuzzi's wide strike zone was criticized by some Cubs players and media for contributing to their 4–0 loss.

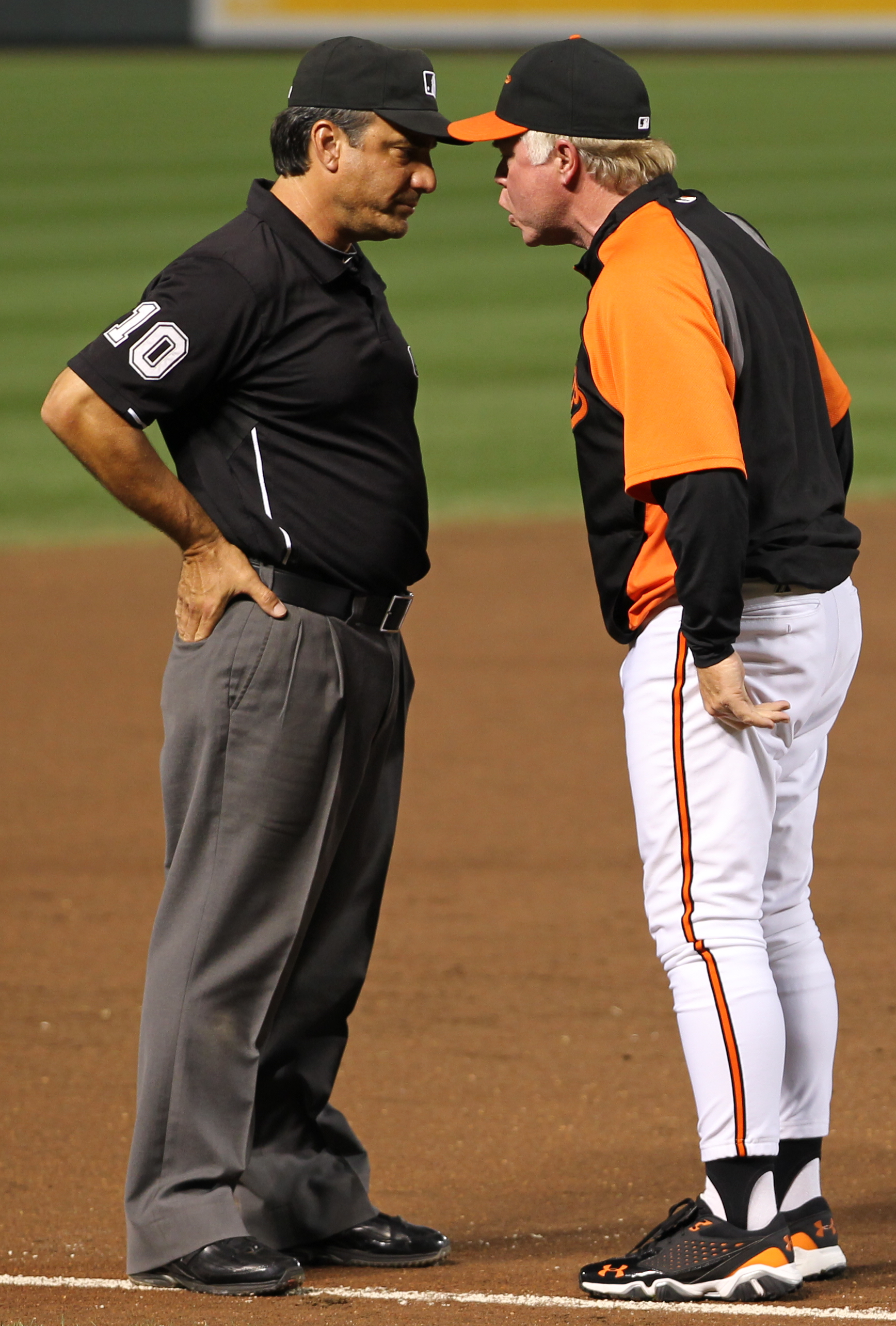
Cuzzi listens as Buck Showalter argues in 2011

Cuzzi has umpired in at least three MLB no-hitters. He was behind the plate for Bud Smith's no-hitter on September 3, 2001, and for Cole Hamels' no-hitter on July 25, 2015. He was the third base umpire when San Francisco Giants pitcher Jonathan Sánchez no-hit the San Diego Padres on July 10, 2009.

Cuzzi was the plate umpire for a game between the Boston Red Sox and Tampa Bay Rays on August 29, 2000. During the game, eight members of the Rays were ejected (seven by Cuzzi), but no Boston players were thrown out, something that reportedly had never happened before.

On April 16, 2009, Cuzzi was the first base umpire for the first game ever at the new Yankee Stadium.

In the top of the 11th inning of game 2 of the 2009 ALDS between the Minnesota Twins and the New York Yankees with no one out, Twins catcher Joe Mauer hit a ball that tipped off of left fielder Melky Cabrera's glove, landed fair, and bounced into the stands – Cuzzi called it a foul ball, denying Mauer of a ground rule double. This call proved to be costly as the Twins lost the game 4–3 on a walk-off home run in the bottom half of the inning.

On August 17, 2019, Cuzzi was umpiring at first base when he ejected Yankees CC Sabathia and Brett Gardner. Prior to Gardner's ejection, Yankees manager Aaron Boone was ejected by home-plate umpire Ben May. After Boone returned to the dugout, Gardner was seen hitting the top of the Yankees dugout with his bat, an action that had gotten him ejected on August 9 by Chris Segal. In ejecting Gardner, Cuzzi demonstrated the action by Gardner which earned him his ejection, holding a phantom bat and jabbing it against a phantom dugout roof.

On August 29, 2025, his seventieth birthday, Cuzzi became the first umpire in major league history to umpire at age seventy, being the home plate umpire in a game between the Los Angeles Dodgers and Arizona Diamondbacks.

== Personal life ==
Cuzzi lives in Nutley, New Jersey with his wife, Gilda. He attended Belleville High School, where he played baseball and football.

== See also ==
- List of Major League Baseball umpires (disambiguation)
