= Helmut Sandrock =

German football administrator

- Born: 15 December 1956 (age 69); Übach-Palenberg
- Title: Secretary general of the German Football Association
- Term: 2012–2016
- Predecessor: Wolfgang Niersbach
- Successor: Friedrich Curtius

Helmut Sandrock (born 15 December 1956 in Übach-Palenberg) is a German football administrator and former Secretary General of the German Football Association (German: Deutscher Fußball-Bund, DFB).

From 2000 to 2002, he was Chief executive officer of MSV Duisburg. As part of the organizing committee of the DFB for the 2006 FIFA World Cup, Sandrock was Tournament Director from 2003 to 2006. After that, he was Managing Director of FC Red Bull Salzburg from 2006 to 2008, with whom he won the Austrian football championship in 2007. With FIFA, Sandrock served as general coordinator at the FIFA Club World Cups in 2006 and 2007, as well as, at the 2009 FIFA Confederations Cup and the 2010 FIFA World Cup. In 2008, he also organized for FIFA the first home game of the Palestine national football team.

In 2008, he became DFB director for league operations, talent promotion, the coaching system and the junior national teams. On 2 March 2012, Sandrock was elected Secretary-General of the DFB. He was also elected UEFA integrations officer that year.

In February 2016, Sandrock resigned as DFB general secretary and was succeeded by Friedrich Curtius. The following month, the FIFA Ethics Committee opened formal proceedings against him relating to the awarding of the 2006 FIFA World Cup.

== Playing career ==
In his youth, Sandrock was a DFB youth international player.
