= John Rodriguez (baseball) =

American baseball player (born 1978)

John Rodríguez
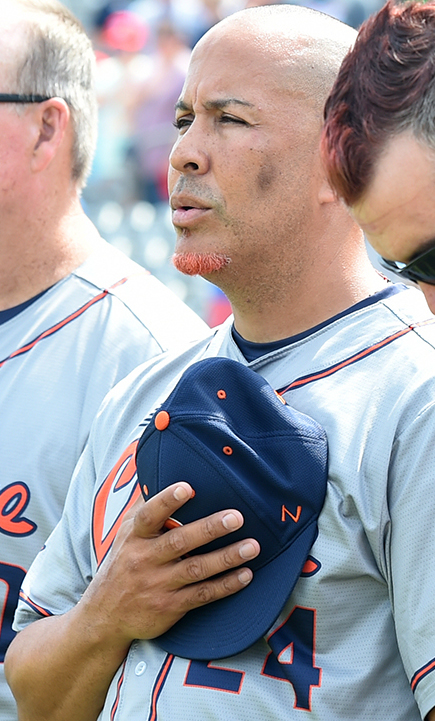
- Rodriguez with the Cleburne Railroaders in 2019
- Outfielder
- Born: January 20, 1978 (age 48); New York City, New York, U.S.
- Batted: Left Threw: Left

MLB debut
- July 18, 2005, for the St. Louis Cardinals

Last MLB appearance
- October 1, 2006, for the St. Louis Cardinals

MLB statistics
- Batting average: .298
- Home runs: 7
- Runs batted in: 43
- Stats at Baseball Reference

Teams
- St. Louis Cardinals (2005–2006)

Career highlights and awards
- World Series champion (2006)

John Joseph Rodriguez (born January 20, 1978) is a retired Major League Baseball Player. He played in the Major Leagues for the St. Louis Cardinals from 2005 to 2006.

== Career ==
Rodriguez attended Brandeis High School. He signed as an undrafted free agent by the Yankees in 1996. Rodriguez played in the Yankees minor league system for eight seasons before signing with the Cleveland Indians in 2005. He was traded to the St. Louis Cardinals later that year and forced a major league call-up to replace the injured Reggie Sanders by hitting .342 with 17 home runs in 34 games with Triple-A the Memphis Redbirds. He performed well enough that the Cardinals signed him to a one-year contract following the season. On July 20, 2005, Rodriguez hit his first career home run off Ben Sheets of the Milwaukee Brewers.

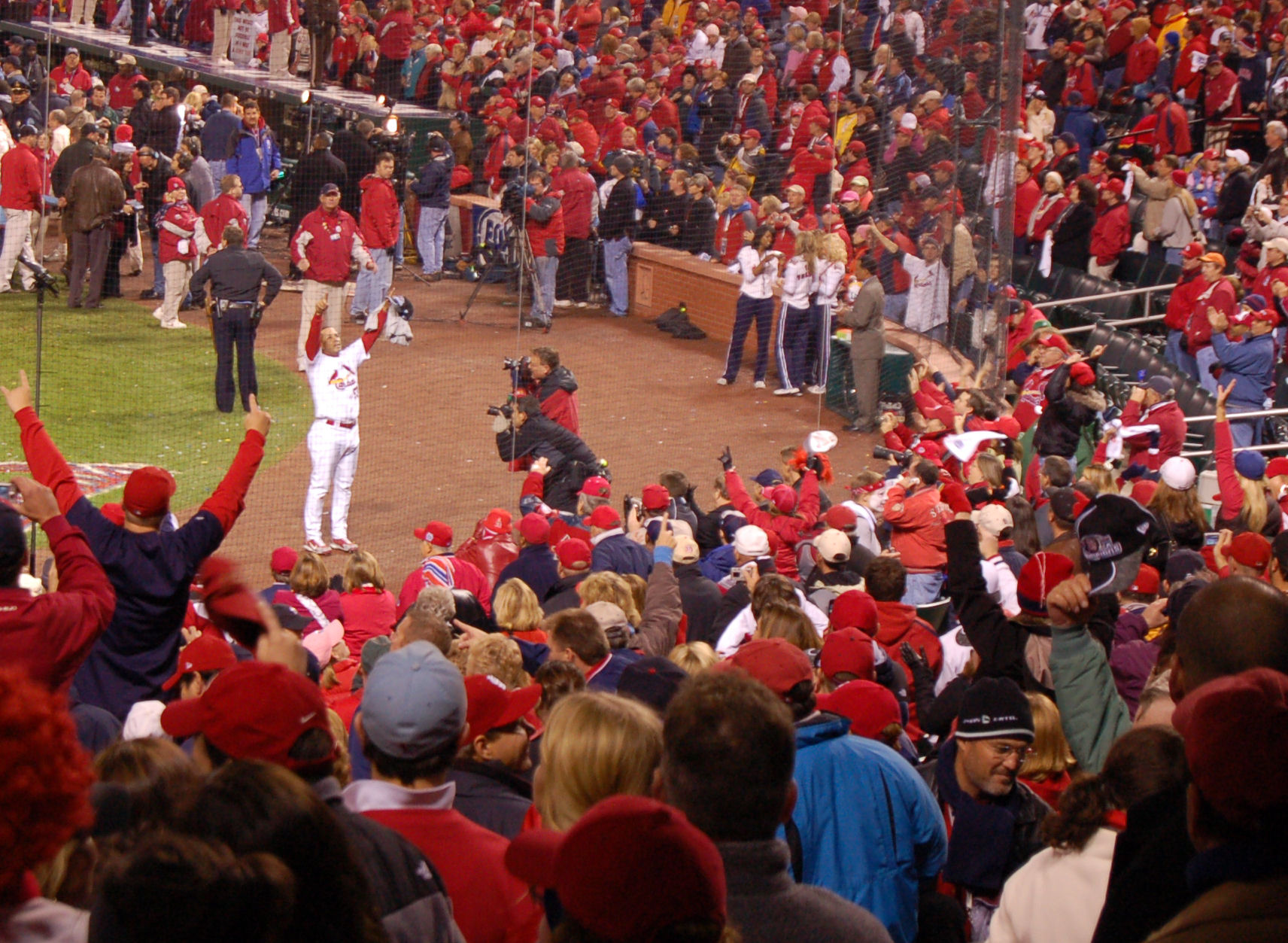
Rodriguez salutes the fans at Busch Stadium after winning the 2006 World Series.

Rodriguez got more playing time for the 2006 Cardinals (183 at-bats, 34 more than the year before) and was on the postseason roster, winning a World Series ring when the Cardinals won the 2006 World Series.

On November 30, 2007, the Cardinals designated Rodriguez for assignment, removing him from the 40-man roster to make room for newly acquired shortstop, César Izturis. Shortly thereafter the team released him.

Rodriguez signed a minor league contract with the Tampa Bay Rays on January 4, 2008, but did not make the major league team out of spring training. On June 2, 2008, Rodriguez was released. On June 8, Rodriguez signed a minor league contract with the New York Mets and was assigned to Triple-A New Orleans.

On January 6, 2009, Rodriguez signed a minor league contract with the New York Yankees. After playing the entire season with the Scranton/Wilkes Barre Yankees, he became a free agent. On May 7, 2010 signed with the Long Island Ducks. On March 2, 2011, he signed a contract with the Long Island Ducks. In May 2012, signed to play for the Wichita Wingnuts in the American Association. Rodriguez played for the Wingnuts during the 2013 season as well.

John is the Head of Baseball Operations and the Head Hitting Instructor at the Yorkville Baseball Academy where he preaches The Art of Hand Path to his students.
