= Mathematical elimination =

In statistics, the terms "mathematical elimination" and "mathematically eliminated" mean to be excluded in a decision, based on numerical counts, due to insufficient total numbers, even if all remaining events were 100% in favor. The excluded outcome is considered to be eliminated due to the mathematical probability being zero (0%).

The term is used in elections when a candidate lacks sufficient votes to win, even if that candidate could garner all remaining votes. In sports, the term "mathematically eliminated" refers to situations where there are not enough future games or competitive events remaining to be played to avoid defeat, even if all future events were won.

== History ==
The term "mathematically eliminated" has been in use for more than 100 years, although the meaning has varied. In a 1904 article, in the American Journal of Psychology, Volume XV, errors of measurement were described as quantifiable to be "mathematically eliminated" from the analysis of the remaining data.
