= KBAL =

KBAL may refer to:

- KBAL-FM (90.3 FM), a defunct religious radio station formerly licensed to Alpine, Texas
- KROY (AM) (1410 AM), a radio station licensed to San Saba, Texas, which was KBAL until 2007
- KNUZ (FM) (106.1 FM), a radio station licensed to San Saba, Texas, which was KBAL-FM from 1995 to 2009
- KULF (1090 AM), a defunct radio station formerly licensed to Bellville, Texas, which was KBAL briefly in late 2009
- KBAL, a fictitious radio station from the horror short AM1200 (film)
