= KNUZ =

KNUZ could refer to:

- 1230 KCOH Houston, Texas, which was KNUZ (AM) until 1997
- 1090 KULF Bellville, Texas, which was KNUZ (AM) from 1997 to 2009
- 106.1 KNUZ (FM) San Saba, Texas, which was KBAL-FM from 1995 to 2009
- KNUZ-TV, a defunct DuMont-affiliated analog television station (channel 39) licensed to Houston, Texas, United States from October 23, 1953-June 25, 1954.
