= Anita Martini =

American sports journalist and broadcaster (1939–1993)

- Born: March 3, 1939; Galveston, Texas, U.S.
- Died: July 10, 1993 (aged 54); Houston, Texas, U.S.
- Resting place: Calvary Catholic Cemetery, Galveston, Texas
- Occupation: Sports journalist
- Known for: First female journalist admitted to a major league baseball team's locker room

Anita Marie Martini (March 3, 1939 – July 10, 1993) was an American sports journalist and broadcaster. She was the first woman to cover a Major League Baseball (MLB) All-Star Game (1973) and the first female journalist allowed into a baseball locker room (after the Los Angeles Dodgers defeated the Houston Astros at the Astrodome to win the National League West pennant on October 1, 1974). Based in Houston for most of her career, Martini worked for radio and television stations in the city from the mid-1960s until shortly before her death.

== Early life ==
Martini was born in Galveston, Texas, where her father operated the holding corporation of the historic Martini Theater at 524 Moody Avenue. She was exposed to baseball as a young child; her uncle, Buck Fausett, was a professional baseball player, and she would often accompany him to ballparks. She was educated at Ursuline Academy, a local private school. Later, she attended Ball High School, the public high school in Galveston. For college, she went to Columbia, Missouri, where she studied for an associate degree in journalism from Stephens College. She got married and moved to Houston after that, but was soon divorced.

== Career ==
By the 1960s, Martini worked for and then owned a Houston publication called FUN Magazine. Her broadcast career began in 1965, and she worked mostly for Houston stations, spending 14 years at KPRC Radio and also appearing on KPRC-TV, KHTV (Channel 39), and KULF Radio. She was the first woman in a major radio market to co-host a sports talk show (with Mike Edmonds on KPRC Radio, 1972-1979 and 1986-1991).

For the first several years of Martini's career, no woman from the media had ever been admitted into a men's locker room in professional sports. At the Astrodome, women were also not allowed on the playing field or in the dining room. On October 1, 1974, immediately after the Los Angeles Dodgers defeated the Houston Astros to finish in first place in win the National League West division title, Martini lined up with male reporters to enter the Dodgers locker room. Predictably, Martini was initially refused access. She asked to speak with Dodgers manager Walter Alston, and Alston allowed her to come into the locker room. Martini conducted interviews that day with Alston and with Dodgers players Steve Garvey and Jimmy Wynn. A lawsuit was later filed against MLB that established the rights of female reporters to enter baseball's locker rooms, but Martini was not involved in the suit.

Martini had a long tenure in Houston, but in a 1975 interview with Sports Illustrated, she expressed disappointment at not getting a chance at a national broadcasting job: "What burns me is the networks are looking for women to accomplish something their men haven't done yet," she says. "I'm not capable of doing a perfect game, but neither is any man." In 1976, Martini interviewed with ABC to broadcast the station's backup game each week, but the network selected former MLB pitcher Bob Gibson. She asked some questions for a 1990 ESPN special, but she was not seen on camera.

With her partner, Nelda Peña, Martini ran a public relations firm that promoted both sports-related and non-sports-related entities.

== Death ==
Martini was diagnosed with brain cancer and underwent brain surgery in April 1989. She experienced partial paralysis on one side of her body after the procedure, but she hosted a radio show from the hospital the day after her surgery. In a January 1990 article in The Galveston Daily News, she was described as "doing fine now."

Martini's health took a turn for the worse around May 1993, and she died of cancer in July of that year. She was inducted into the Texas Radio Hall of Fame in 2015.
