= Ed Goodson =

American baseball player (born 1948)

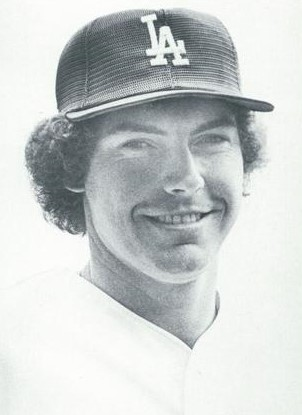
- First baseman / Third baseman
- Born: January 25, 1948 (age 78); Pulaski, Virginia, U.S.
- Batted: Left Threw: Right

MLB debut
- September 5, 1970, for the San Francisco Giants

Last MLB appearance
- October 2, 1977, for the Los Angeles Dodgers

MLB statistics
- Batting average: .260
- Home runs: 30
- Runs batted in: 170
- Stats at Baseball Reference

Teams
- San Francisco Giants (1970–1975); Atlanta Braves (1975); Los Angeles Dodgers (1976–1977)

James Edward Goodson (born January 25, 1948) is an American former first baseman and third baseman in Major League Baseball. He played from 1970 to 1977 for the San Francisco Giants, Atlanta Braves and Los Angeles Dodgers. In his one World Series plate appearance, in the sixth game of the 1977 fall classic, he was struck out by the Yankees’ Mike Torrez.

In 1973, Goodson got hot at the plate and was put in the starting lineup, the Giants moving 3rd baseman Dave Kingman to 1st to make room for Goodson, who led the major leagues in hitting for almost two weeks, reaching a high average of .333.

Goodson was born in Pulaski, Virginia, and played high school baseball for the Fries, Virginia, Wildcats. He was a hero to many young boys in his hometown of Fries, Va., who used to ride a school bus annually to see him play both in Atlanta and Cincinnati when the Giants were in town. Goodson returned to his home county of Grayson after baseball to coach high school and continued to mentor the young players.

He was traded along with Dusty Baker from the Braves to the Dodgers for Jerry Royster, Tom Paciorek, Lee Lacy and Jimmy Wynn on November 17, 1975.

In 515 games over eight seasons, Goodson posted a .260 batting average (329-for-1266) with 108 runs, 51 doubles, 30 home runs and 170 RBIs. Defensively, he recorded a .994 fielding percentage at first base, his primary position, and a .911 fielding percentage at third base for an overall .976 fielding percentage.
