= Jerry Royster =

American baseball player, coach and manager (born 1952)

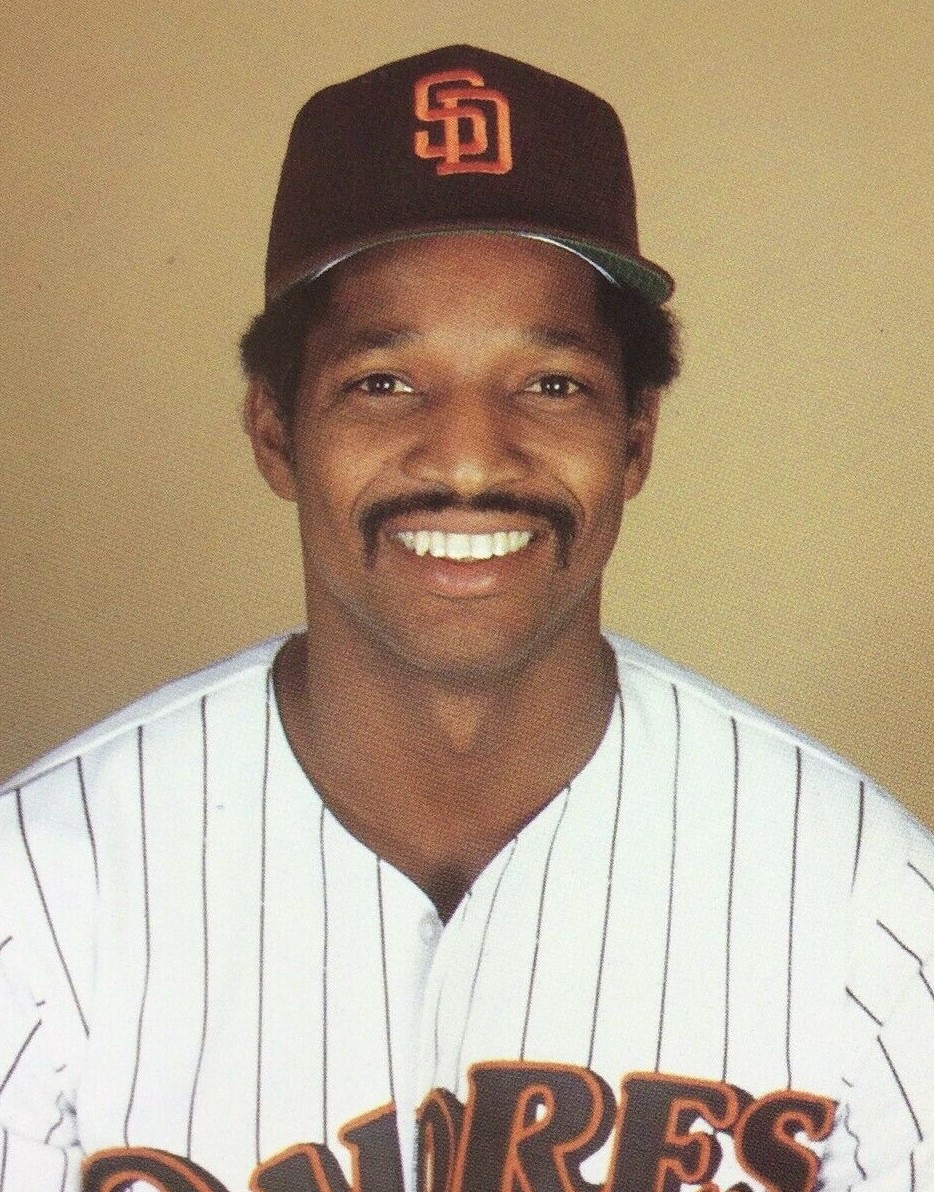
- Third baseman / Second baseman / Left fielder / Coach / Manager
- Born: October 18, 1952 (age 73); Sacramento, California, U.S.
- Batted: Right Threw: Right

MLB debut
- August 14, 1973, for the Los Angeles Dodgers

Last MLB appearance
- September 28, 1988, for the Atlanta Braves

MLB statistics
- Batting average: .249
- Hits: 1,049
- Home runs: 40
- Runs batted in: 352
- Managerial record: 53–94
- Managerial winning %: .361

KBO statistics
- Managerial record: 204–185
- Managerial winning %: .524
- Stats at Baseball Reference
- Managerial record at Baseball Reference

Teams
- As player: Los Angeles Dodgers (1973–1975); Atlanta Braves (1976–1984); San Diego Padres (1985–1986); Chicago White Sox (1987); New York Yankees (1987); Atlanta Braves (1988); As manager: Milwaukee Brewers (2002); Lotte Giants (2007–2010); As coach: Colorado Rockies (1993); Milwaukee Brewers (2000–2002); Boston Red Sox (2012)

Jeron Kennis Royster (born October 18, 1952) is an American former Major League Baseball (MLB) third baseman, second baseman, left fielder, manager, and coach. He played for the Los Angeles Dodgers, Atlanta Braves, San Diego Padres, Chicago White Sox, and the New York Yankees. He was manager of the Milwaukee Brewers in the MLB and the Lotte Giants in the Korea Baseball Organization (KBO). He is father to actress Kara Royster, who is best known for her recurring roles in TV shows Supernatural, Pretty Little Liars, Dynasty, and K.C. Undercover.

== Career ==
He was signed by the Dodgers as an amateur free agent in 1970 at age 17. Three years later he was promoted to the Dodgers. He was traded along with Tom Paciorek, Lee Lacy and Jimmy Wynn from the Dodgers to the Atlanta Braves for Dusty Baker and Ed Goodson on November 17, 1975. He became a regular third baseman with the Braves and in 1976 he was named to the 1976 Topps All-Star Rookie Roster. In 1977, Royster recorded the lowest single-season batting wins above replacement (WAR) in MLB history, finishing at -4.0 according to Baseball Reference.

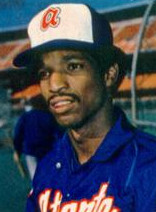
Royster with the Atlanta Braves

After nine years with the Braves, Royster joined the San Diego Padres as a free agent. In 1987, he split the season with the Chicago White Sox and the New York Yankees. He returned to the Braves in 1988 and retired at the end of the season.

In 1,428 games over 16 seasons, Royster posted a .249 batting average going 1049 for 4208 with 552 runs, 40 home runs, 352 runs batted in, 189 stolen bases, and 411 walks.

Royster coached the Vero Beach Dodgers and was a third base coach for the Colorado Rockies. He coached for the Milwaukee Brewers under manager Davey Lopes until 15 games into the 2002 season, Lopes was fired and Royster was named interim manager. Two weeks later the interim tag was removed but at the end of a disappointing 53–94 stint, he was fired.

Royster managed the Las Vegas 51s from 2005 until he was fired in late September 2006. Late in 2007, Royster was signed to manage the Lotte Giants in Busan, South Korea. He is the first non-Korean to manage a KBO team and received honorary Busan citizenship in 2008. On October 13, 2010, the Lotte Giants decided not to renew Royster's contract following the Giant's defeat by the Doosan Bears in the first round of the KBO playoffs.

In 2012, Royster was the third-base coach for the Boston Red Sox.

In 2014, Royster coached the Shalhevet Firehawks to a 2nd-place finish in the Mulholland League.

=== Managerial record ===
As of April 24, 2022

Team	Year	Regular season					Postseason			
Team	Year	Games	Won	Lost	Win %	Finish	Won	Lost	Win %	Result
MIL	2002	147	53	94	.361	6th in NL Central	–	–	–	–
Total		147	53	94	.361		-	-	–	

== See also ==
- List of Major League Baseball career stolen bases leaders
- Lotte Giants

Preceded by None	Colorado Rockies third-base coach 1993; April 5 – June 26	Succeeded by Don Zimmer
Preceded by Ron Hassey	Colorado Rockies first-base coach 1993; June 27 – October 3	Succeeded by Gene Glynn
Preceded by Bob Melvin	Milwaukee Brewers bench coach 2000–2002	Succeeded by Cecil Cooper
Preceded by Tim Bogar	Boston Red Sox third-base coach 2012	Succeeded by Brian Butterfield
