= Lee Lacy =

American baseball player (born 1948)

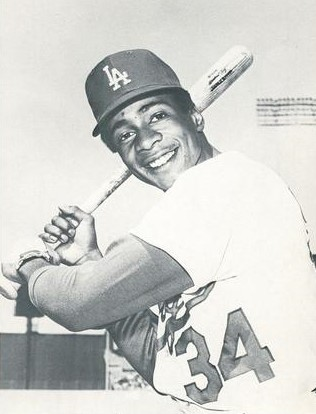
- Outfielder
- Born: April 10, 1948 (age 77); Longview, Texas, U.S.
- Batted: Right Threw: Right

MLB debut
- June 30, 1972, for the Los Angeles Dodgers

Last MLB appearance
- October 3, 1987, for the Baltimore Orioles

MLB statistics
- Batting average: .286
- Home runs: 91
- Runs batted in: 458
- Stats at Baseball Reference

Teams
- Los Angeles Dodgers (1972–1975); Atlanta Braves (1976); Los Angeles Dodgers (1976–1978); Pittsburgh Pirates (1979–1984); Baltimore Orioles (1985–1987)

Career highlights and awards
- World Series champion (1979)

Leondaus "Lee" Lacy (born April 10, 1948) is an American former professional baseball outfielder. He played sixteen seasons in Major League Baseball (MLB) for the Los Angeles Dodgers, Atlanta Braves, Pittsburgh Pirates, and Baltimore Orioles between 1972 and 1987.

== Playing career ==
He was traded along with Jerry Royster, Tom Paciorek and Jimmy Wynn from the Dodgers to the Braves for Dusty Baker and Ed Goodson on November 17, 1975.

Lacy appeared in four World Series with the Dodgers (1974; 1977–1978) and the Pirates (1979).

On May 17, 1978, Lacy hit his third consecutive pinch-hit home run, setting a major league record, as the Dodgers beat the Pirates, 10–1. His previous home runs were on May 2 and 6. Lacy's record was matched in 1979 by Del Unser, who hit three consecutive pinch-hit homers on June 30, July 5 and July 10.

In 1985, Lacy was among a number of players caught up in the Pittsburgh drug trials scandal. The next year, he was given a 60-day suspension but was allowed to continue playing if he donated five percent of his base salary and performed 50 hours of drug-related community service.

On June 8, 1986, as a member of the Orioles, Lacy hit three home runs and had six RBI in an 18-9 win over the Yankees.

== Career statistics ==
In 1523 games played, Lacy recorded a .286 batting average (1303-4549) with 650 runs, 207 doubles, 42 triples, 91 home runs, 458 RBI, 185 stolen bases, 372 walks, .339 on-base percentage, and .410 slugging percentage. His overall career fielding percentage was .975.

== Personal life ==
Lacy is the father of Jennifer Lacy, a forward in the Women's National Basketball Association (WNBA).

== See also ==
- List of doping cases in sport
