= Dusty Baker =

American baseball player and manager (born 1949)

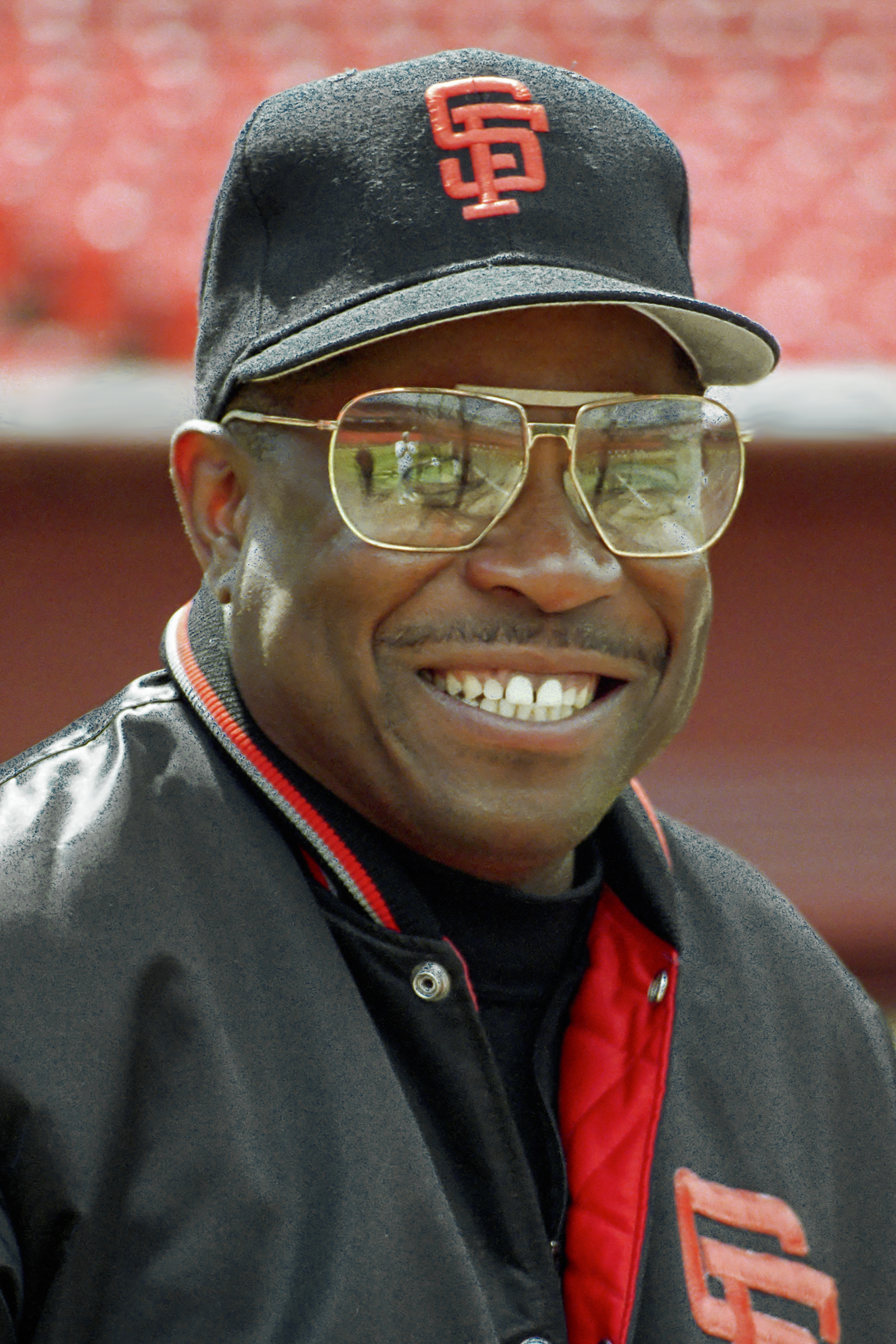
- Baker with the San Francisco Giants in 1991
- Outfielder / Manager
- Born: June 15, 1949 (age 77); Riverside, California, U.S.
- Batted: Right Threw: Right

MLB debut
- September 7, 1968, for the Atlanta Braves

Last MLB appearance
- October 4, 1986, for the Oakland Athletics

MLB statistics
- Batting average: .278
- Home runs: 242
- Runs batted in: 1,013
- Managerial record: 2,183–1,862
- Winning %: .540
- Stats at Baseball Reference
- Managerial record at Baseball Reference

Teams
- As player: Atlanta Braves (1968–1975); Los Angeles Dodgers (1976–1983); San Francisco Giants (1984); Oakland Athletics (1985–1986); As manager: San Francisco Giants (1993–2002); Chicago Cubs (2003–2006); Cincinnati Reds (2008–2013); Washington Nationals (2016–2017); Houston Astros (2020–2023); As coach: San Francisco Giants (1988–1992)

Career highlights and awards
- 2× All-Star (1981, 1982); 2× World Series champion (1981, 2022); NLCS MVP (1977); Gold Glove Award (1981); 2× Silver Slugger Award (1980, 1981); 3× NL Manager of the Year (1993, 1997, 2000); Legend of Dodger Baseball
Military career
Branch	United States Marine Corps
Service years	1968–1974
Rank	Lance Corporal
Unit	United States Marine Corps Reserve

Johnnie B "Dusty" Baker Jr. (Note: As stated by Baker, his middle name is "Just B. My dad was raised in the South. Southern people would go by J.B. or J.C., and we were raised Southern-style.") (born June 15, 1949) is an American former professional baseball outfielder and manager in Major League Baseball (MLB). He played in MLB for 19 seasons, most notably with the Los Angeles Dodgers. During his Dodgers tenure, he was a two-time All-Star, won two Silver Slugger Awards and a Gold Glove Award, and became the first NLCS MVP, which he received for his performance during the 1977 National League Championship Series. He also made three World Series appearances and was a member of the 1981 World Series championship team. Outside of the Dodgers, Baker played for the Atlanta Braves, San Francisco Giants, and Oakland Athletics.

After retiring as a player, Baker served as the manager of the Giants from 1993 to 2002, the Chicago Cubs from 2003 to 2006, the Cincinnati Reds from 2008 to 2013, the Washington Nationals from 2016 to 2017, and the Houston Astros from 2020 to 2023. Baker was named NL Manager of the Year three times with the Giants and won the 2022 World Series with the Astros. He was also the first MLB manager to reach the playoffs and win a division title with five different teams, having accomplished both feats with each team he managed. Baker ranks seventh in MLB managerial wins and has the most wins among African-American managers. Following his retirement as a manager, Baker joined the Giants' front office. He was also named the manager of Team Nicaragua for the 2026 World Baseball Classic.

== Early life ==
Johnnie B "Dusty" Baker Jr. was born on June 15, 1949, in Riverside, California, as the oldest of seven children. He earned the nickname "Dusty" from his mother because of his propensity for playing in a dirt spot in the backyard. His father worked as an Air Force sheet metal technician at Norton Air Force Base. Baker played a variety of sports growing up, describing basketball as his very first love while also playing sports such as baseball, with his father being his coach for Little League, although this did not stop the elder Baker from kicking his son off of teams because of his tantrums. When the younger Baker wanted to quit baseball and have a paper route, his father told him that he did not raise a son who was a quitter as a way to try to encourage him to spin his attitude in a positive direction. In 1963, when Dusty was 14 years old, the Baker family moved to Carmichael, California, where his father worked at McClellan Air Force Base. Baker grew up as a fan of the Los Angeles Dodgers and described Tommy Davis as his hero, but the signing of Bobby Bonds in 1968 made him a fan of the San Francisco Giants.

Baker excelled in baseball, basketball, football, and track at Del Campo High School in Carmichael, California. He was inducted into the Sac-Joaquin Section's Hall of Fame class in 2010 for his athletic achievements at Del Campo, and into the National High School Hall of Fame in 2019. He was offered a basketball scholarship by Santa Clara University. His father was so committed to his son going to college that he told scouts that his son would go to college and play either football or basketball, so they wouldn't waste a draft pick on Baker. The one baseball scout who saw something in Baker was Bill Wight, who knew that Baker's father and mother had gone through a divorce that worried Baker about being a potential burden to his parents.

== Professional career ==
=== Draft and minor leagues ===
Baker was drafted by the Atlanta Braves in the 1967 amateur draft. On June 19 of that year, the Braves tasked Hank Aaron to try to influence Baker to sign with the team, with Aaron promising to both Baker and his mother Christine that he would take care of Baker as if he was his own son while guaranteeing that Baker would be in the majors before his college class graduated. Baker decided to sign with the team to the anger of his father, who sued to nullify the contract (and the $15,000 signing bonus), which led to a decision where the State of California appointed a trustee over his finances until his 21st birthday. Baker did not speak to his father for three years.

As an outfielder, Baker played his first baseball games in the Texas League in Austin in the AA classification, playing nine games in 1967. He then played in the Western Carolinas League and the Florida State League (mostly in the former) before playing six games in the majors the following year. It was also during the year that Baker would serve in the Marine Corps Reserve as a motor transport mechanic for six years.

=== Atlanta Braves (1968–1975) ===
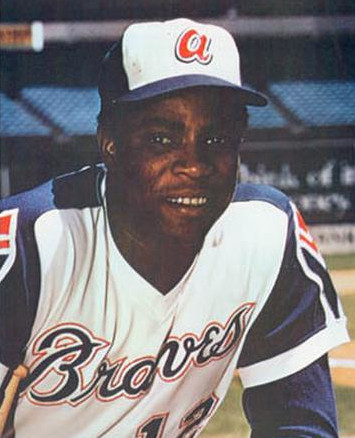
Baker in 1974

Baker made his debut as a call-up on September 7, 1968, against the Houston Astros. He went 0-for-1, and he appeared in five other games that year and collected two hits. He played in the minors for most of the next three seasons, playing just 45 games for the major league Braves during that time while batting over .300 for the Triple-A Richmond Braves in 1970 and 1971. Finally, Baker made the roster for Opening Day in 1972 to get a true start to his major league career. He played in 127 games while batting .321 (third best in the National League) with 143 hits, seventeen home runs and 76 runs batted in (RBI); he received votes for Most Valuable Player, finishing 22nd. It was during the 1970s that Baker played for the Yaquis de Obregón of the Mexican Pacific League in the offseason, stating it was the toughest league that he ever played in professionally. The following year, he would play in 159 games (a career high) and batted .288 while collecting 174 hits with 101 runs, 21 home runs, and 99 runs batted in with 24 stolen bases (the latter two were career highs). He played two further seasons with the Braves, batting over .255 in each as the center fielder, but it was a moment on April 8, 1974, that earned him a place in history. On that day Baker batted fifth in the lineup behind Hank Aaron. In the fourth inning, with Baker on deck, Aaron hit a shot to left field off Al Downing for his 715th home run to pass Babe Ruth in career home runs. After expressing a desire to be traded upon the closure of the 1975 season, Baker was traded along with Ed Goodson from the Braves to the Los Angeles Dodgers for Jerry Royster, Tom Paciorek, Lee Lacy and Jimmy Wynn on November 17, 1975.

=== Los Angeles Dodgers (1976–1983) ===
1976 postcard of Baker for Los Angeles Dodgers

Many of Baker's accomplishments as a player would come during his time with the Los Angeles Dodgers, where he spent the next eight seasons. His tenure began in 1976 with a meager .242 batting average in 112 games that saw him collect just 93 hits with 39 RBIs while suffering a problem with his stretched knee ligaments that required surgery after the season ended. However, he bounced back in 1977 by playing in 153 games that saw him bat .291 with 155 hits, thirty home runs and 86 runs batted in. It is believed that Baker played an integral part in the first-ever high five, which occurred between Baker and Dodgers teammate Glenn Burke on October 2, 1977, at Dodger Stadium, a story featured in the ESPN 30 for 30 documentary The High Five (2014), directed by Michael Jacobs.

"It was the last day of the regular season, and Dodgers leftfielder Dusty Baker had just gone deep off the Astros' J. R. Richard. It was Baker's 30th home run, making the Dodgers the first team in history to have four sluggers – Baker, Ron Cey, Steve Garvey, and Reggie Smith – with at least 30 homers each. It was a wild, triumphant moment and a good omen as the Dodgers headed to the playoffs. Burke, waiting on deck, thrust his hand enthusiastically over his head to greet his friend at the plate. Baker, not knowing what to do, smacked it. 'His hand was up in the air, and he was arching way back', says Baker. 'So I reached up and hit his hand. It seemed like the thing to do.'"

Baker would see the postseason for the first time in his career as the Dodgers won the National League West that season. The Dodgers faced the Philadelphia Phillies in the NLCS. Baker proved key in Game 2 when he hit a grand slam in the fourth inning to break a 1–1 tie that the Dodgers won 7–1. His second and last home run of the series proved just as important, as he hit a two-run shot off Steve Carlton in the second inning of Game 4 in a game the Dodgers won 4–1 to clinch the National League pennant. In total, he went 5-of-14 (.357) while driving in eight runs. For his efforts, he was awarded the first-ever National League Championship Series (NLCS) Most Valuable Player (MVP) award. The Dodgers faced the New York Yankees in the 1977 World Series. Baker collected one home run in the series (Game 3) while going 7-for-24 (.292) with five runs batted in, but the Dodgers lost the Series in six games. In the 1978 season, he batted .262 while collecting 137 hits. The Dodgers and Phillies met up for a rematch. The result would be the same, as the Dodgers won the pennant in four games, and Baker went 7-of-15 (.467) with one run batted in. In the 1978 World Series, they met the Yankees again, with the same result for Baker and the Dodgers (complete with him hitting only one home run) as he batted .238 in the six-game loss.

Baker batted .274 in 1979 before improving in 1980 with heightened contact, as he batted .294 with 170 hits, 29 home runs, and 97 RBIs. He finished fourth in MVP voting while winning the Silver Slugger Award. The 1981 season was shortened by a strike that saw a first and second half division champion, but Baker and the Dodgers were not slowed down. He played in 103 games and batted a career-high .320 with 128 hits and 49 RBIs that saw him named to his first All-Star Game. He was also awarded the Silver Slugger Award and the Gold Glove Award while finishing seventh in MVP voting. The Dodgers won the first-half NL West title and thus were matched against the second-half champion in the Houston Astros. Baker batted .167 in the Division Series, but the Dodgers won in five games. In the Championship Series against the Montreal Expos, he batted .316 with three runs batted in as the Dodgers won in a closely contested five-game series to win their third pennant in four years. Facing the New York Yankees in the 1981 World Series, Baker batted just .167 with one run batted in, but the Dodgers won in six games to win the title. The following year, Baker batted .300 in 147 games with 171 hits, 23 home runs and 88 RBIs to make his second and final All-Star Game. He closed out his Dodgers career in 1983 by batting .260 with 138 hits; curiously, this was the first season since 1975 where he drew more walks than strikeouts (in this case walking a career-high 72 times with 59 strikeouts). In the NLCS, he batted .357 while hitting a home run for his fifth and final career postseason home run; the Dodgers lost in four games.

=== San Francisco Giants (1984) ===
He became a free agent after the season and signed with the San Francisco Giants for the 1984 season. He played 100 games that year and batted .292 with 71 hits and three home runs.

=== Oakland Athletics (1985–1986) ===
He was traded to the Oakland Athletics on March 24, 1985, for two minor league players. While he would play the outfield during his time there, he also played first base at times, playing 61 games of his tenure at the position while also serving as a designated hitter for 28 total games. He played 111 games in 1985 and batted .268 with fourteen home runs and 52 RBIs. He played sparingly for his final season in 1986 with 83 games and a .240 batting average. He appeared in his final game on October 4, 1986, against the Kansas City Royals; he went 0-for-1 with two walks before being taken out for a pinch-runner in the seventh inning. While the Athletics offered to send him down to Triple-A for the 1987 season, Baker elected for free agency instead and subsequently retired.

In a career that spanned nineteen years, Baker played in 2,039 games while collecting 1,981 hits, 242 home runs, and 1,013 runs batted in while never going on the disabled list. Baker is noted for his love of toothpicks, saying, "Toothpicks are an excellent source of protein" while chewing at least one every game. He also uses the toothpick as a way to deter the use of chewing tobacco, which he used as a player. In his final season of 1986, he began wearing a wristband (featuring his face), which he has continued to do as a manager; he has stated it is to help wipe perspiration off his forehead.

== Coaching career ==
=== San Francisco Giants (1988–1992) ===
Baker was working as a stockbroker in 1987 when he received a call from Hank Aaron, Joe Morgan, and Frank Robinson to go to Dallas, Texas to try to get jobs for minority baseball players after they finished their playing careers, which came in the wake of controversial remarks by Dodgers general manager Al Campanis on April 6, 1987. (Note: Two months after the comments made by Campanis (and his subsequent firing), Major League Baseball appointed sociologist Harry Edwards as special adviser for racial affairs. Edwards contacted Campanis first about minority candidates who could make good managers. The first name Campanis listed was Baker.) While in Dallas trying to find jobs for players, Bob Kennedy, senior baseball operations executive for the San Francisco Giants, told Baker that Al Rosen, general manager of the Giants, asked to see Baker about a possible job. On the advice of his father, Baker, alongside his brother and daughter, set out to Lake Arrowhead to pray and seek guidance to decide whether he should see Rosen and possibly return to baseball. However, while checking into the hotel, Baker encountered Bob Lurie, owner of the Giants, which seemed a sign for Baker to take an opportunity, if offered. When Baker eventually met with Rosen, Rosen stated interest in having him serve as a first base coach, which differed from Baker stating interest in possibly being an assistant general manager because Rosen thought he would be better suited to manage on the field. Baker set out a goal to try to manage within five years or he would step down. Baker's coaching career started as a first base coach for the Giants in 1988, and then he spent the following four years (1989–1992) as the hitting coach. In 1992, he managed the Scottsdale Scorpions in the Arizona Fall League.

== Managerial career ==
=== San Francisco Giants (1993–2002) ===
In 1992, Giants manager Roger Craig was fired while Bob Quinn was named general manager (the week prior, Rosen resigned) by the new ownership that was led by Peter Magowan. On December 16, 1992, Baker was hired to manage the club, becoming the seventh black manager hired to manage a Major League Baseball team. He beat out four other candidates in John Wathan, Davey Lopes, Tom Trebelhorn, and Ron Gardenhire. In his first year as Giants manager, the team had acquired Barry Bonds the same month Baker was promoted. Baker would win the NL Manager of the Year award (until 2021, he was the only Giant to win the award), leading the team to a 103–59 record. However, it was not enough for a playoff berth. They had led the National League West by 9 1/2 games on August 7, but they ended up losing the National League West to the Atlanta Braves. The Giants lost 12–1 on the final day of the season when a win could have forced a tiebreaking game with Atlanta for the division championship (the following year, a Wild Card was instituted in both leagues). It was the second-best record in baseball that year behind the 104–58 Atlanta Braves and 31 games better than their 72–90 finish the previous season. He was the first manager since Sparky Anderson (1970) to win 100 games as a rookie manager, and the fourth to do so. Since the Giants missed the playoffs (as only the division winners qualified before 1995), he also became the eighth and so far the last manager to lead a team to 100 wins without making it to the postseason.

His Giants went on to win division titles in 1997, and again in 2000; Baker won Manager of the Year honors in both of those years as well. He was the second person to win the award three times after Tony La Russa, and the first to do so with the same team all three times. His easy-going style of managing led to a description of him as a "player's manager", to where he learned Spanish to try to help relate to his players. It was also during his San Francisco tenure that the term "Dustiny" was coined by former Giants pitcher Rod Beck. However, the postseason would elude Baker and the Giants, as they fell in the NLDS in 1997 and 2000 while losing a tie-breaker game for the Wild Card spot in 1998.

In 2002, his Giants won 95 games and clinched the Wild Card by 3 1/2 games. In the 2002 National League Division Series, they faced the Atlanta Braves. The two teams split the first four games before a pivotal Game 5 in Atlanta, which the Giants won 3–1 to deliver their first postseason series victory since 1989. The Giants faced the St. Louis Cardinals (who had beaten the Arizona Diamondbacks, the defending champions) in the 2002 National League Championship Series. The Giants won the series in five games for their first pennant in thirteen years, winning on a walk-off single by Kenny Lofton. They advanced to the World Series against the Anaheim Angels, who were managed by his former Dodger teammate Mike Scioscia. The teams split the first two games in Anaheim before going to San Francisco. In Game 3, they were routed 10–4, but the Giants responded with a narrow 4–3 victory in Game 4 before a big win in Game 5 by a score of 16–4. The Giants were one victory away from the championship and had two games in Anaheim to do so. The Giants struck first in Game 6, scoring three runs in the fifth inning before adding runs in the sixth and seventh innings to make it 5–0. However, the seventh would start the unraveling of the game; in the inning, starting pitcher Russ Ortiz (who had 98 pitches) allowed consecutive singles after getting one out before Baker pulled him out for Félix Rodríguez. Scott Spiezio came up to the plate and soon hit a shot to right field to narrow the score to 5–3. In the next inning, Darin Erstad hit a leadoff line-drive shot for a home run before Tim Salmon and Garret Anderson hit singles that made Baker put in Robb Nen (battling a shoulder injury for most of the year) to try to close out the inning without allowing more runs. However, a double by Troy Glaus scored the runners to give the Angels a lead they would not relinquish. The five-run deficit was the largest comeback in an elimination game in the World Series. While the Giants scored first in Game 7, the Angels scored three runs in the third inning to build a cushion on their way to a 4–1 victory.

Despite Baker's success in San Francisco, he had an increasingly strained relationship with owner Peter Magowan, one that even the Giants' first pennant in 13 years could not mend. The Giants did not renew his contract after the season, letting him leave to manage the Chicago Cubs and hiring Felipe Alou to replace him. Baker finished his tenure with a record of 840 wins and 715 losses in the regular season and 11 wins and 13 losses in the post-season.

To date, Baker is one of only four African Americans to manage a World Series team. Cito Gaston was the first, managing the Toronto Blue Jays to championships in 1992 and 1993. Baker was the second, and Ron Washington and Dave Roberts have since joined Gaston and Baker by managing the Texas Rangers and Los Angeles Dodgers, respectively, to the World Series, with Roberts winning championships in 2020, 2024 and 2025 World Series. Baker left as the all-time winningest manager in the San Francisco era of Giants history; Bruce Bochy would later eclipse him alongside managing the Giants to World Series titles in 2010, 2012, and 2014.

=== Chicago Cubs (2003–2006) ===
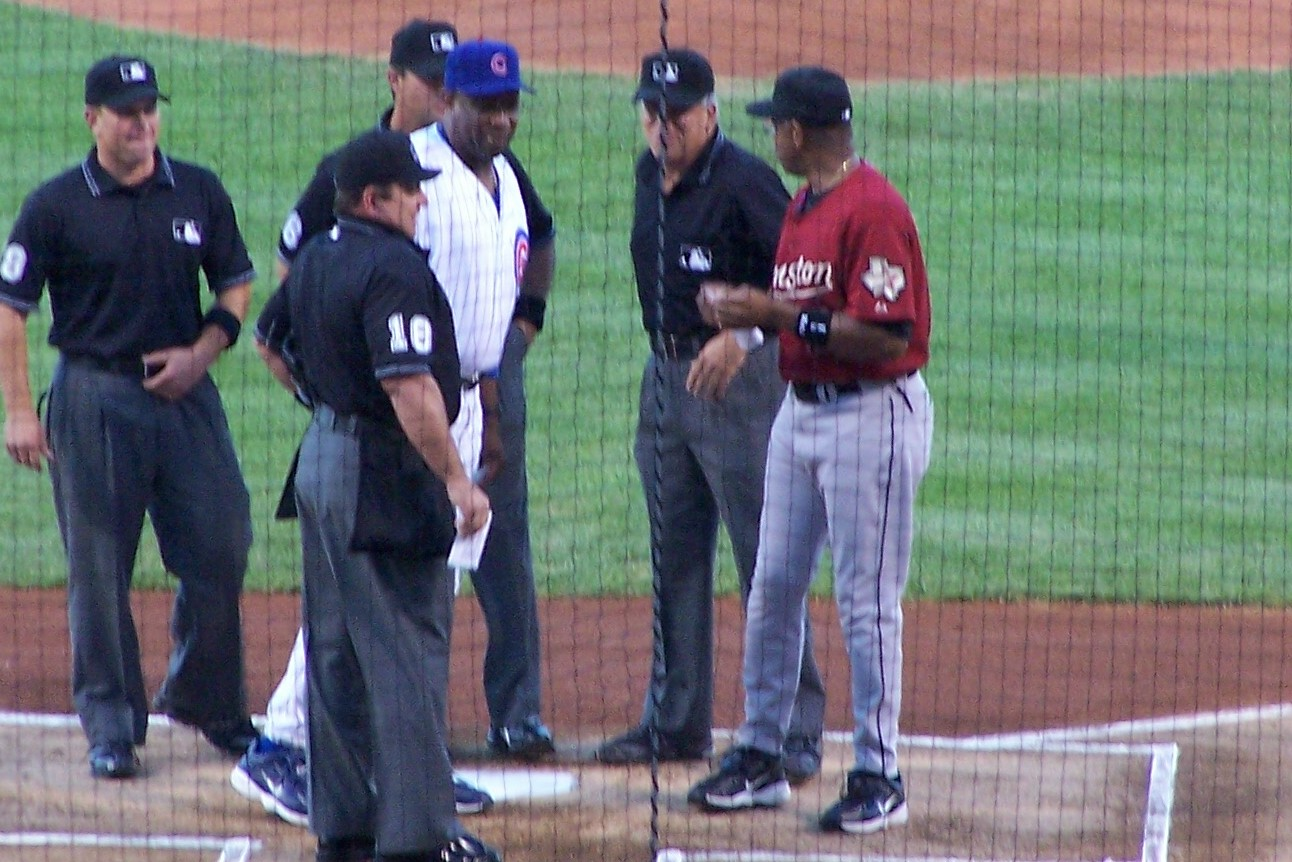
Baker meeting with Cecil Cooper of the Houston Astros prior to a 2006 matchup at Wrigley Field.

It was speculated that Baker would be hired by the Chicago Cubs as soon as he was let go from the Giants. Cubs general manager Jim Hendry interviewed several managers for their open position such as Bob Melvin, Ken Macha, Buck Showalter and Fredi Gonzalez, but Hendry went with his first name in mind with Baker. On November 15, 2002, he was hired by the Chicago Cubs to a four-year deal to manage the team, replacing Bruce Kimm, who had taken over when Don Baylor was fired in the middle of the third 90-loss season in four years.

Baker would make a major impact in his first season as manager for the Cubs in 2003. In July of that year, Baker was the subject of some controversy when he stated that "black and Hispanic players are better suited to playing in the sun and heat than white players." Baker, defending his beliefs, later said, "What I meant is that blacks and Latinos take the heat better than most whites, and whites take the cold better than most blacks and Latinos. That's it, pure and simple. Nothing deeper than that." With the help of an impressive pitching staff and big gun batters such as Sammy Sosa and Moisés Alou, the Cubs claimed their first division title in fourteen years. Baker led the Cubs to victory over the Atlanta Braves in the National League Division Series, the first postseason series victory for the team since the 1908 World Series. However, the hopes for the Cubs winning a World Series title were cut short during the 2003 National League Championship Series against the Florida Marlins. In Game 6, with Chicago, five outs away from the pennant and holding a 3–0 lead, the infamous Steve Bartman foul ball incident near the fans in left field would unravel the Cubs and derail the chance for their first World Series appearance in 58 years. The Bartman incident proved to be a distraction for fans and the media, but it was critical execution failures by the Cubs such as a wild pitch on a ball four, a fielding error on a potential inning-ending double play, and a bad throw from the outfield after a Marlins hit, which allowed the Marlins to score eight runs in that eighth inning to win the game 8–3; Cubs player Doug Glanville also stated that the loss in Game 5 (where Josh Beckett threw a two-hit shutout) was the true turning point of the series. The Marlins would go on to win Game 7 at Wrigley Field on their way to winning the 2003 World Series.

In 2004, the team was involved in a heated wild card chase with the Houston Astros but fell out of contention near the season's end, losing six of their last eight games and missing the playoffs by three games. He also received criticism from television analyst Steve Stone, who blamed Baker for his players harassing him at team charters and hotels, which Baker waved off as being "grown men". On August 30, Baker won his 1,000th game as manager with a win over the Montreal Expos, doing so in his 1,848th game.

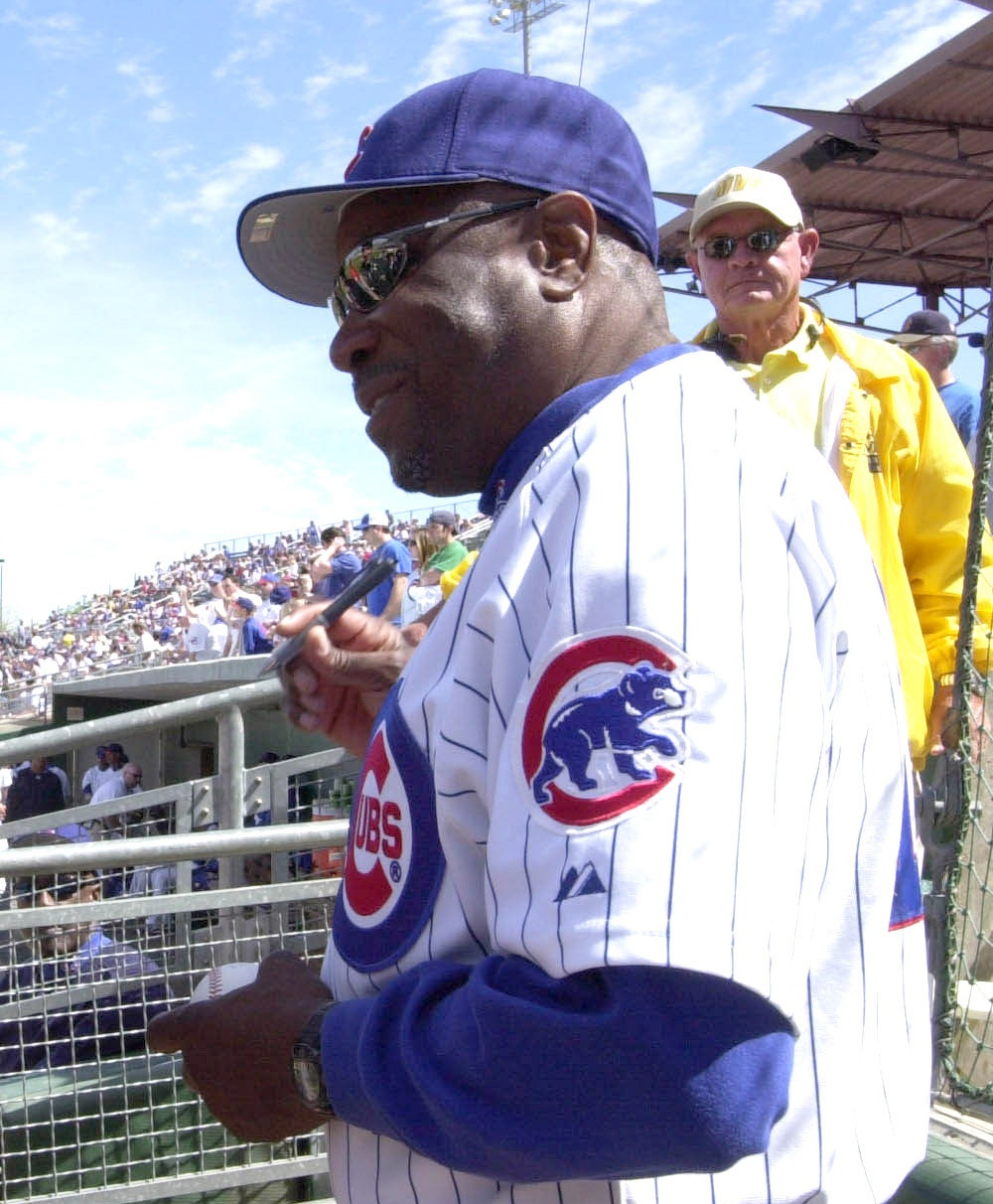
Baker with the Chicago Cubs in 2006.

In 2005, the Cubs lost several of their key players, most notably ace pitchers Mark Prior and Kerry Wood, to injuries. The team finished the season with a 79–83 record, marking the first time in three years that the Cubs finished with a losing record. The Cubs’ performance continued to decline in 2006 as they fell to 66–96 and finished last in the entire National League. Baker, an old-school baseball traditionalist, was scrutinized for the Cubs' declining productivity. Baker has said that putting men on base can be unimportant and merely "clogging up the bases." This position has made Baker a target among the sabermetric community. It was around this time that Baker came under scrutiny for his tendency to overuse pitchers, such as with Kerry Wood and Mark Prior. Wood and Prior suffered serious arm injuries following their first full seasons under Baker. Wood and Prior averaged 122 and 126 pitches per start, respectively, in their final six regular-season starts of 2003. However, the only season where Wood was used for a full season under Baker's tenure was in 2003, in which he pitched 211 innings, which was two innings more than he had pitched in 2002. In the next three seasons, Wood would only pitch a combined total of 226 innings due to injuries before the Cubs decided to try him as a reliever after 2006. Additionally, Wood and Prior have been quoted as not blaming Baker for what happened with his career, with Prior stating that he had to balance pitcher use with the decisions required to try to help the Cubs win games. Prior also cited him as an inspiration to stay in the game after he retired from pitching, with Baker describing baseball as a relationship.

A month after the 2006 season ended, the Cubs declined to renew Baker's contract. They allowed Baker to address the media in a press conference in early October, where he officially announced his departure. The Cubs turned to Lou Piniella to replace Baker for the 2007 season. Baker finished his tenure with a regular-season record of 322 wins and 326 losses and a postseason record of six wins and six losses.

=== Cincinnati Reds (2008–2013) ===
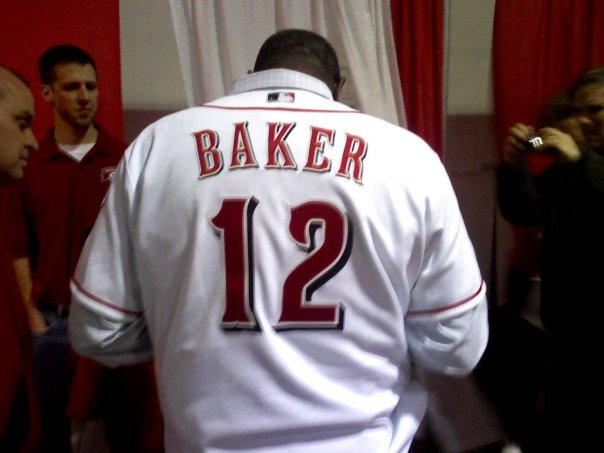
Baker sporting his new Reds jersey at RedsFest 2007.

On October 13, 2007, Baker was hired as manager of the Cincinnati Reds, replacing interim manager Pete Mackanin. He was the first black manager in Cincinnati Reds history; the Reds hired Baker on the heels of having fired Jerry Narron after another losing season (Baker became the fifth Reds manager since the year of 2003), with Baker being the first Reds manager hired with no prior ties to the organization since 1990. Baker and the Reds finished 74–88 and 78–84 in 2008 and 2009, finishing 5th and 4th in the NL Central. In 2010, the Reds enjoyed success as one of baseball's breakout teams (which included first baseman Joey Votto being named Most Valuable Player of the National League), and on September 28, 2010, the Reds won the Central title. This championship led to their first playoff appearance in 15 years. However, the appearance was short-lived as the Reds were swept by the Philadelphia Phillies in the NLDS. Baker signed a two-year contract extension with the Reds on October 4, 2010.

The Reds won 97 games in 2012 to win the National League Central for the second time in three seasons (only the Washington Nationals won more games than the Reds that year in the NL). In September 2012, Baker stayed in a Chicago hospital for treatment of an irregular heartbeat. At the time, Baker had been dealing with a longstanding heart problem. The Reds clinched the 2012 Central Division championship in his absence, their second in three years and Baker's fifth as a manager. In the 2012 National League Division Series, the Reds faced the San Francisco Giants. The Reds beat the Giants 5–2 and 9–0 in San Francisco to lead the series heading back to Cincinnati. Game 3 turned out to be a tight affair with the Reds on the wrong side of it, as a bobbled play by Scott Rolen led to the winning run by the Giants, and they tied the series with an 8–3 victory in Game 4. In Game 5, the Reds collapse became complete, as the Giants scored six runs in the fifth inning to win 6–4, making them the second team in NLDS history to blow a 2–0 series lead (after 1981) and the third team ever to blow a 2–0 lead in a best-of-five series. On October 15, 2012, he signed a two-year contract extension as manager of the Reds.

In 2013, the Reds won ninety games, but it was only good enough for a third-place finish in the division (the Cardinals won the division by seven games), and a five-game losing streak closed out the regular season. As such, they were the second Wild Card team and faced the division rival Pittsburgh Pirates (who won 94 games) in Wild Card game. Baker was fired by the Reds three days after the game. The Pirates, making their first postseason appearance since 1992, took the lead in the second inning and never relinquished it, cruising to a 6–2 victory. Reds general manager Walt Jocketty admitted the team's latest collapse played a role in the decision to fire Baker. Baker finished his tenure with a regular season record of 509 wins and 463 losses and a 2–7 postseason record. he was the first full-time Reds manager to finish with a winning record since Jack McKeon and he is currently the last Reds manager to have a winning record as of 2025. On October 22, 2013, he was replaced by Reds pitching coach Bryan Price.

=== Washington Nationals (2016–2017) ===
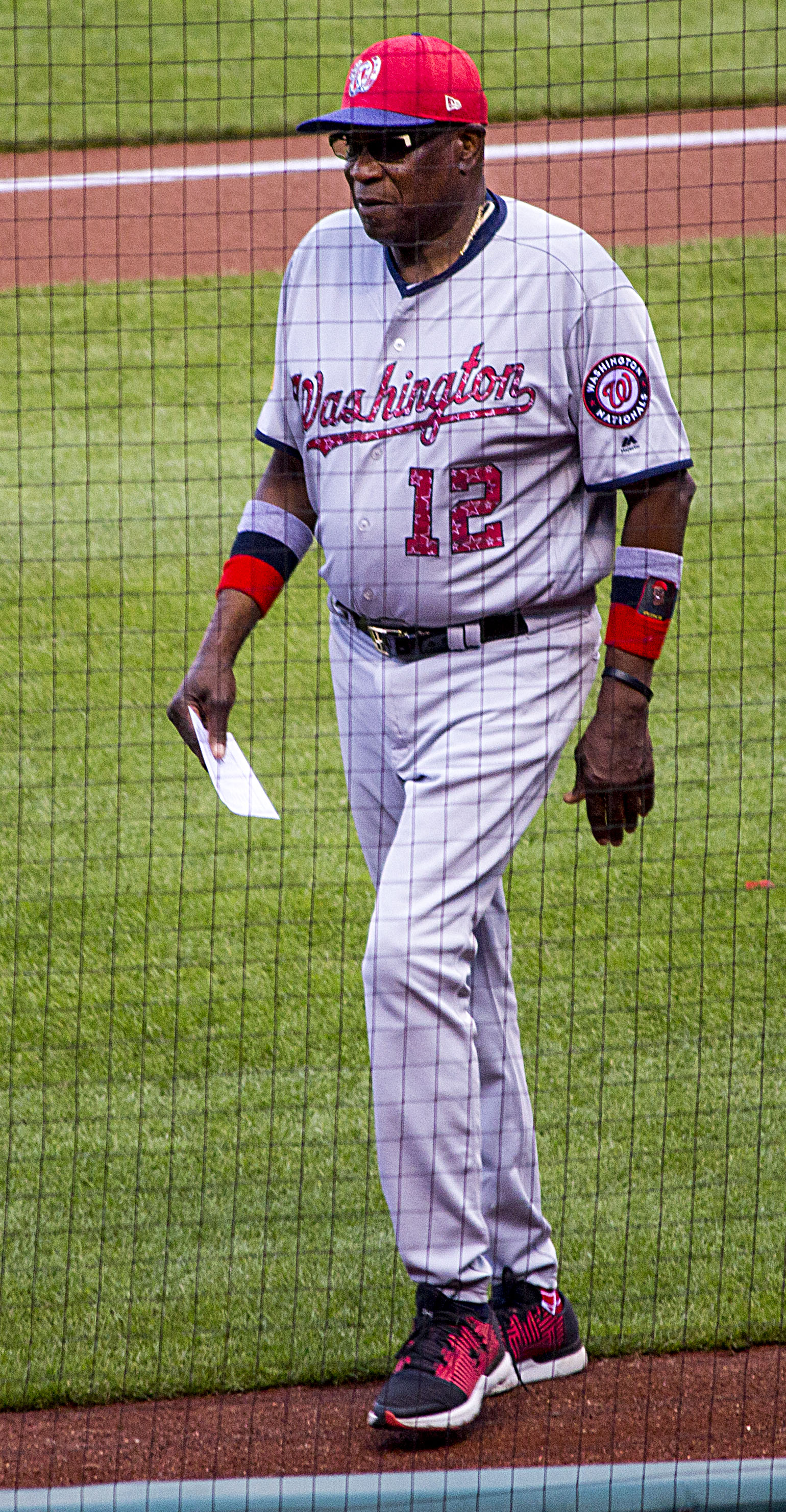
Baker managing the Nationals in 2017

In the two-year gap between jobs, Baker called multiple franchises looking to fill their respective vacancies, such as the Detroit Tigers, the Seattle Mariners, and the San Diego Padres, but only the latter even gave him a callback (they later hired Andy Green).

On November 3, 2015, Baker was named the new manager for the Washington Nationals for the 2016 season, his first managerial position since being fired by Cincinnati in 2013; he was hired to replace Matt Williams after a deal with Bud Black fell through. At the time of his hiring, he was the only black manager in Major League Baseball and had the second-highest total for most wins in MLB. Comments made shortly after his hire raised attention when he suggested his Washington Nationals should field more players of color as "you've got a better chance of getting some speed with Latin and African-Americans." Baker said of the comments, "I'm not being racist. That's just how it is." The hire came with scrutiny that Baker would overuse pitchers as he was alleged to do before, but it was noted that his prior Reds teams featured players throwing fewer pitches, and some baseball writers have noted that there is no clear link between pitches thrown and injuries suffered.

The Nationals won the NL East in Baker's first season with 95 wins (a twelve-game improvement), which was the third time the team had won the NL East in the last five seasons. However, the Nationals lost in the NLDS in five games against the Los Angeles Dodgers after losing Game 4 and Game 5 (in the latter game, the Nationals gave up four runs in the seventh inning in a 4–3 loss). The following season, Baker led the Nationals to another NL East Championship. However, their postseason was once again cut short after losing in the 2017 NLDS to the Chicago Cubs in five games. Game 5 saw the Nationals lead 4–1 by the time of the second inning, but the game turned wildly in the fifth inning with four runs that were all scored on two outs, which included multiple hits, a passed ball, an error, catcher's interference, and a hit batter. While the Nationals tried to rally, the Cubs prevailed 9–8. The fifth game was the tenth time in fourteen years that a Baker-managed team had lost a "close-out" game with the opportunity to advance to the next round of the playoffs, which was a record; in both NLDS matchups, the Nationals had outscored their opponent but lost the series. On October 20, 2017, the Nationals announced that Baker and his entire coaching staff would not return as the team's manager in 2018.

=== Houston Astros (2020–2023) ===
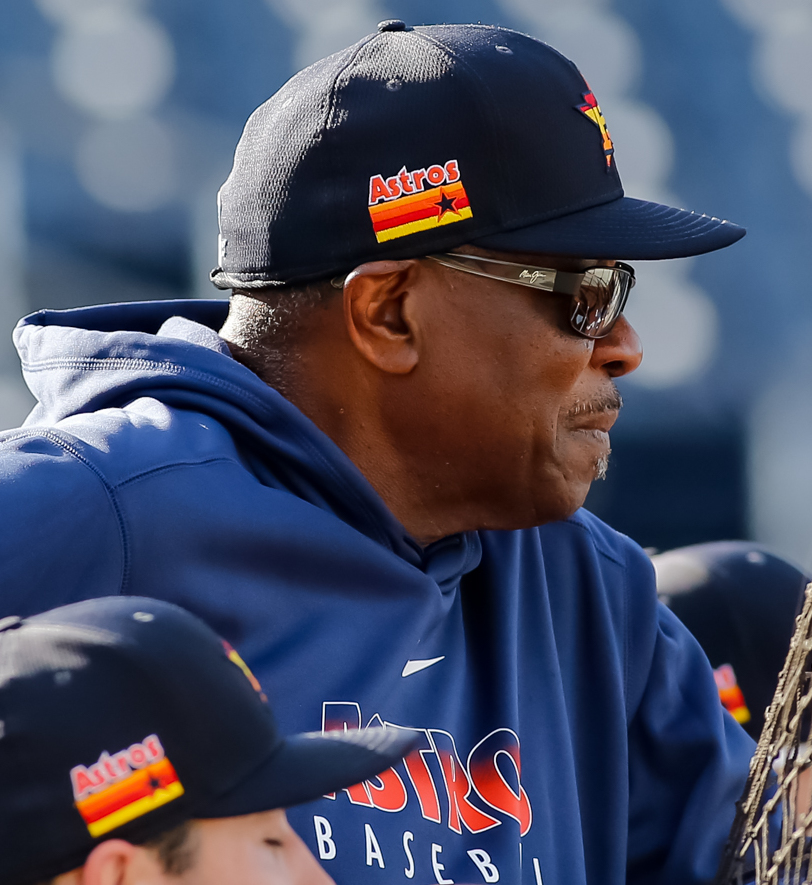
Baker with the Houston Astros in 2020

In 2020, Baker was one of three finalists for the Philadelphia Phillies job, alongside Joe Girardi and Buck Showalter, but Girardi got the job.

==== 2020 ====
On January 13, 2020, the manager's job for the Houston Astros opened up, as A. J. Hinch was fired in the wake of the Astros sign stealing scandal. Candidates for the role included Showalter, John Gibbons, Joe Espada, and Will Venable. On January 29, Baker became the third manager to be hired after the age of 70 and first since Jack McKeon. Baker was also the first manager in the two-league era to have coached over 3,000 games in one league before managing a single game in the other, as this was his first managerial job in the American League (AL). His contract was for one year with a club option for a second year.

On July 28, 2020 (four days after the shortened season started), the Astros picked up the 2021 option on Baker's contract. On September 25, the Astros clinched a playoff spot as the sixth seed in the pandemic-shortened season. Baker became the first baseball manager to lead five teams to the postseason. He also became the first manager to lead a team that finished under .500 in the postseason to a series win, having beaten both the Minnesota Twins and the Oakland Athletics to reach the AL Championship Series (ALCS). It was the first time since 2003 that a Baker-led team had made the League Championship Series. The Astros lost to the Tampa Bay Rays in seven games after having come back from a 3–0 deficit. Baker's appearance in Game 7 (a winner-take-all) was his ninth as manager, setting a new record for most appearances by a manager in a winner-take-all game, although Baker has only won two of those games.

==== 2021 ====
On April 22, 2021, Baker secured his 1,900th win as a manager in the regular season, becoming the 14th manager to do so with an 8–2 victory over the Los Angeles Angels. Four days later, he passed Gene Mauch for 13th on the all-time wins list with a 5–2 win over the Seattle Mariners. On April 30, he passed Casey Stengel for 12th all-time with a 9–2 win over the Tampa Bay Rays, the teams' first meeting since the previous year's ALCS.

By winning the AL West division, Baker became the first manager in the major leagues to guide five different clubs to division titles. In the playoffs, the Astros first played the Chicago White Sox in the AL Division Series (ALDS). The White Sox were led by Tony La Russa, whom Baker had faced as manager over 200 times previously, and whose careers both had intertwined and spanned more than five decades. They met most frequently in games in the NL Central, when La Russa managed the St. Louis Cardinals, and Baker managed the Cubs and Reds.

The Astros faced the Boston Red Sox in the ALCS. On October 22, the Astros won Game 6 of the series to clinch the pennant, doing so in a dramatic comeback where they had lost two of the first three games to the Boston Red Sox (who had hit three grand slams in Game 2 and 3 combined) before winning three in a row to advance to the World Series. The 19-year gap between World Series appearances is the second longest all-time among managers (with the only greater one being by Bucky Harris), and Baker became the ninth manager in major league history to win a pennant in both leagues. The Astros faced the Atlanta Braves in the Series and lost in six games.

==== 2022 ====
On November 5, 2021, Astros owner Jim Crane announced that Baker had agreed to a one-year extension to manage the club for the 2022 season. He had managed over 24 major league seasons. On May 3, 2022, Baker earned his 2,000th win as manager with a 4–0 victory over the Seattle Mariners at home in Minute Maid Park. Coincidentally, both Baker's first win and his 2,000th win involved the father-son tandem of Peñas in the lineup, as Gerónimo Peña batted leadoff for the St. Louis Cardinals versus the Giants on April 6, 1993, and son Jeremy started the May 3 game as shortstop for the Astros. Baker became the twelfth manager and first African American manager to reach the milestone. Baker was named the AL manager in the MLB All-Star Game played at Dodger Stadium in Los Angeles. The Astros won their 90th game of the season on September 11 versus the Angels, giving Baker a 12th season reaching that threshold in wins as manager. On September 19, the Astros clinched the AL West title, Baker's ninth division title as manager. On September 24, the Astros won 11–10 over the Baltimore Orioles, their 100th of the season. It made Baker the fourth manager to have 100-win seasons in both the AL and NL, as Baker had achieved the mark with San Francisco in 1993; Baker went 23 seasons between 100-win seasons, the longest for any manager to have multiple 100-win seasons. On October 2, the Astros won their 104th game, setting a new high in wins for a Baker-managed team. The Astros finished with a 2.90 team ERA, second best in MLB. When asked about what was necessary for good pitching, he stated, "Control, control, control... Everybody talks about velocity all the time, but the velocity without command and control is no good."

In the 2022 postseason, the Astros were first matched up against the Seattle Mariners in the ALDS. The Mariners scored seven runs by the 7th inning of Game 1 and promptly scored two runs over the next 29 innings as the Astros rallied to win Game 1 and 2 before winning Game 3 in an eighteen-inning scoreless duel 1–0, as the Astros outscored the Mariners 13–9. It was Baker's first-ever LDS sweep as manager, and it guaranteed the Astros a sixth straight appearance in the ALCS. In the ALCS against the New York Yankees, the Astros won narrowly in Games 1, 2, and 4 (with one blowout win in Game 3) to complete a sweep, making them the third team to sweep the LDS and LCS since 1995. The Game 4 win on October 23 clinched the fourth pennant in the last six seasons for the Astros and it was Baker's third pennant as a manager. It was his sixth postseason series victory with Houston, after having won three postseason matchups in his first 22 seasons.

The World Series would culminate a historic run for Baker and his Astros. They finished the year with an ERA of 0.83 that saw relievers allow five total earned runs, doing so with management of high-leverage players such as Bryan Abreu and Rafael Montero despite having a 1.15 regular season ERA (but high walk rate) in Ryne Stanek. On November 3, Baker won his 50th postseason game as manager, becoming only the fourth in MLB history to do so. On November 5, the Astros defeated the NL champion Philadelphia Phillies in Game 6 of the World Series, winning Baker his second World Series and first as a manager. At age 73, he is the oldest manager to win the World Series, surpassing Jack McKeon. It was his 28th postseason victory with the Astros, tying him with A. J. Hinch for most playoff wins as an Astro; the Astros went 11–2 in the postseason, becoming the fourth team in the Wild Card era (since 1995) to lose fewer than three times in the playoffs, and Houston never faced elimination at any point in their postseason. Baker won his first World Series title 40 years after winning one as a player, establishing a record for the longest gap between World Series championships by a player/manager in MLB history. He also became the third African-American manager to win a World Series after Cito Gaston (1992 and 1993) and Dave Roberts (2020).

==== 2023 ====
Baker passed Joe McCarthy for eighth all-time in wins on June 1, 2023, with a 5–2 victory versus the Los Angeles Angels. Baker was named manager of the American League team for the All-Star Game, played at T-Mobile Park in Seattle. He invited former Dodgers teammate Billy North as an honorary coach, as well as Seattle manager Scott Servais, a former Giants teammate, to the coaching staff. On August 9, an 8–2 win over Baltimore earned Baker his 2,159th win as manager to pass Bucky Harris for sole possession of seventh place all-time. The Astros clinched the AL West on the final day of the season to mark the tenth division title won by a team managed by Baker while making him the first Astros manager to lead a team to the playoffs in four consecutive seasons. They faced the Minnesota Twins in the ALDS. The Astros victory in Game 1 of the ALDS gave Dusty Baker his 29th postseason win as the Astros skipper, passing A.J. Hinch to be the winningest postseason manager in Astros history. They beat the Twins to set the Astros up for another trip to the ALCS, this time against the Texas Rangers. The ALCS would be noted for the home team losing every game that saw the Rangers rout Houston in Game 7. Baker announced his retirement from MLB on October 25, two days after the series ended.

=== Nicaragua (2026) ===
In July 2025, Baker was announced as the manager of the Nicaragua national baseball team for the 2026 World Baseball Classic, with the first round of pool play scheduled for from March 6–11, 2026, at LoanDepot Park in Miami, Florida. He accepted the job after being approached by Marvin Benard, who previously managed Nicaragua and had played under Baker for seven seasons with the Giants.

Baker first managed the national team in a tune-up exhibition series against Cuba. At the 2026 WBC, Nicaragua went winless in four pool stage games, and was forced to requalify. The team nearly pulled off an upset victory over the Netherlands, but lost on a walk-off homer by Ozzie Albies with two outs in the 9th inning; Baker defended the move to not intentionally walk Albies (which would have brought up Didi Gregorius) or force the switch-hitting Albies to bat right-handed. Andscape described the move as "the kind of decision managers get paid to make based on interpretation [...] gambled, lost."

== Executive career ==
=== San Francisco (2024–present) ===
On January 18, 2024, Baker agreed to a third stint with the Giants in the front office, this time as a Special Advisor to Baseball Operations.

== Managerial record ==
Team	Year	Regular season					Postseason			
Team	Year	Games	Won	Lost	Win %	Finish	Won	Lost	Win %	Result
SF	1993	162	103	59	.636	2nd in NL West	–	–	–	
SF	1994	115	55	60	.478	2nd in NL West	No postseason due to players strike			
SF	1995	144	67	77	.465	4th in NL West	–	–	–	
SF	1996	162	68	94	.420	4th in NL West	–	–	–	
SF	1997	162	90	72	.556	1st in NL West	0	3	.000	Lost NLDS (FLA)
SF	1998	163	89	74	.546	2nd in NL West	–	–	–	
SF	1999	162	86	76	.531	2nd in NL West	–	–	–	
SF	2000	162	97	65	.599	1st in NL West	1	3	.250	Lost NLDS (NYM)
SF	2001	162	90	72	.556	2nd in NL West	–	–	–	
SF	2002	161	95	66	.590	2nd in NL West	10	7	.588	Lost World Series (ANA)
SF total		1,555	840	715	.540		11	13	.458	
CHC	2003	162	88	74	.543	1st in NL Central	6	6	.500	Lost NLCS (FLA)
CHC	2004	162	89	73	.549	3rd in NL Central	–	–	–	
CHC	2005	162	79	83	.488	4th in NL Central	–	–	–	
CHC	2006	162	66	96	.407	6th in NL Central	–	–	–	
CHC total		648	322	326	.497		6	6	.500	
CIN	2008	162	74	88	.457	5th in NL Central	–	–	–	
CIN	2009	162	78	84	.481	4th in NL Central	–	–	–	
CIN	2010	162	91	71	.562	1st in NL Central	0	3	.000	Lost NLDS (PHI)
CIN	2011	162	79	83	.488	3rd in NL Central	–	–	–	
CIN	2012	162	97	65	.599	1st in NL Central	2	3	.400	Lost NLDS (SF)
CIN	2013	162	90	72	.556	3rd in NL Central	0	1	.000	Lost NLWC (PIT)
CIN total		972	509	463	.524		2	7	.222	
WSH	2016	162	95	67	.586	1st in NL East	2	3	.400	Lost NLDS (LAD)
WSH	2017	162	97	65	.599	1st in NL East	2	3	.400	Lost NLDS (CHC)
WSH total		324	192	132	.593		4	6	.400	
HOU	2020	60	29	31	.483	2nd in AL West	8	5	.615	Lost ALCS (TB)
HOU	2021	162	95	67	.586	1st in AL West	9	7	.563	Lost World Series (ATL)
HOU	2022	162	106	56	.654	1st in AL West	11	2	.846	Won World Series (PHI)
HOU	2023	162	90	72	.556	1st in AL West	6	5	.545	Lost ALCS (TEX)
HOU total		546	320	226	.586		34	19	.642	
Total		4,046 (Note: Baker also managed a game that ended in a tie on August 15, 2002)	2,183	1,862	.540		57	51	.528	

== Baseball career accomplishments ==
- First manager in major league history to lead five different teams to division titles
- Ninth manager to win both an AL pennant and an NL pennant.
- Twelfth manager and first African American manager with 2,000 victories, and first African American manager with 50 postseason victories
- Oldest manager to appear in, and win, the World Series (2022)

== Broadcasting career ==
Baker served as an ESPN analyst during the 2006 MLB postseason and served in a similar role during the 2007 season. In 2015, Baker joined TBS as a studio analyst for the final two weeks of their regular season coverage and for their coverage of the National League playoffs.

== Personal life ==
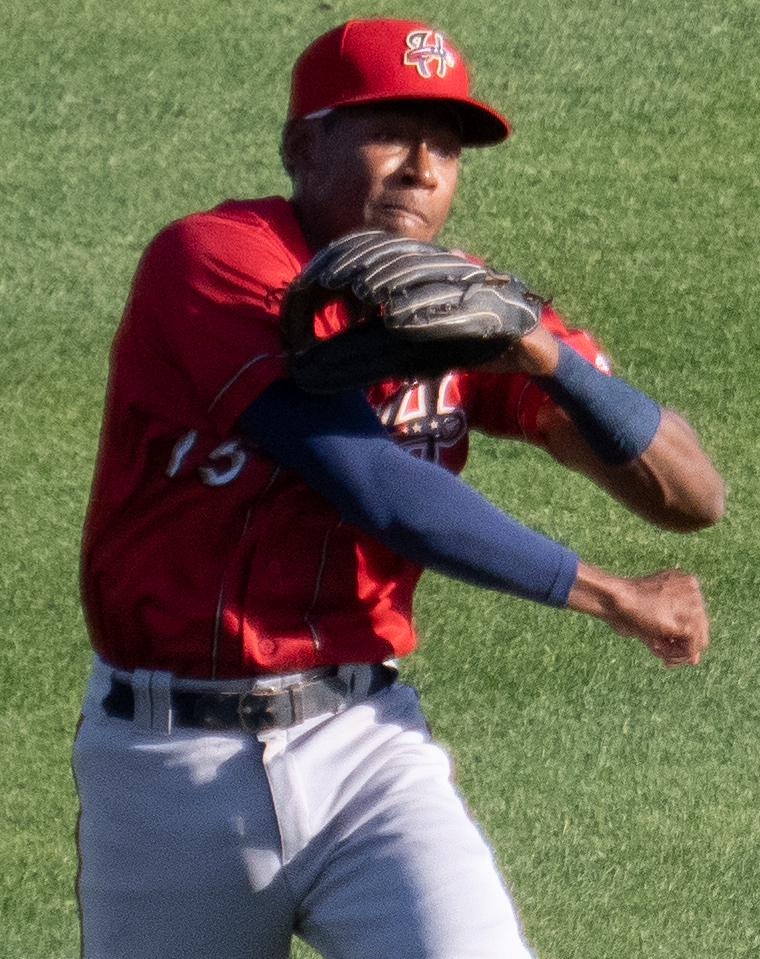
Darren Baker playing for the Harrisburg Senators in 2022

Baker was a member of the United States Marine Corps Reserve from 1969 through 1975. Baker's son, Darren Baker, was rescued by J. T. Snow from being run over at home plate as a batboy during the 2002 World Series. In 2017, Darren was drafted in the 27th round of the MLB draft by the team his father managed at the time, the Washington Nationals. He decided to play as infielder for the California Golden Bears, and in 2021 he was drafted by the Nationals in the 10th round of the amateur draft, where this time he signed to join the organization. In 2024, Darren made his MLB debut for the Nationals. Baker and his family reside in Granite Bay, California.

In the winter of 2001, Baker was diagnosed with prostate cancer during a routine check-up (his father had been diagnosed with the disease eight years prior). Baker had had surgery in December of that year to remove his prostate (his fears over potentially having the cancer return led him to name his three-year-old son as a batboy to "show him the world"). Near the end of the 2012 baseball season, Baker was hospitalized for both an irregular heartbeat and a "mini-stroke".

For some time, Baker had troubles with the Internal Revenue Service, who had determined that his investments in tax shelters for some years (as guided by his brother Victor) were to be disallowed, which would have resulted in penalties of at least a million dollars with interest. When managing the Giants, the IRS garnished his paychecks, leaving him with less than a percent of his $900,000 salary to live on a month; around the time of negotiating his contract in 1999, Magowan loaned him money in case he needed to deal with the IRS, which Baker repaid later. With the help of a tax crisis lawyer (over several years), the issue was resolved, roughly around the time the news was broken by the media in late 2002.

Baker is a member of the National Advisory Board for Positive Coaching Alliance, a national non-profit organization committed to providing student-athletes with a positive, character-building youth sports experience. Baker has appeared in several videos and webinars for this organization, all of which can be found on the group's YouTube channel. Dusty is also owner of Baker Family Wines, along with owner and winemaker Chik Brenneman. Baker was inducted into the Bay Area Sports Hall of Fame in 2015. He returned to the Giants organization in 2018 as a Special Advisor to the CEO.

== Legacy ==
Due to his presence at various moments in baseball history, Baker has been frequently cited as baseball's Forrest Gump equivalent. These moments include the following:

- Baker was on the on-deck circle when Hank Aaron hit his record 715th career home run.
- Baker was in the home dugout at Dodger Stadium when Rick Monday prevented an American flag from getting burnt on the field on April 25, 1976. Monday would become teammates with Baker from the following season to the end of Baker's Dodgers tenure in 1983.
- Baker was on the opposing Dodgers when Reggie Jackson hit three home runs in Game 6 of the 1977 World Series, earning himself the moniker of "Mr. October". Jackson would join the Astros' front office in 2021, the second season of Baker's tenure as the Astros' manager.
- Baker represented the final out of Nolan Ryan's fifth no-hitter in 1981, surpassing Sandy Koufax for most career no-hitters.
- Baker was a coach for the Giants during the 1989 World Series, and was in Candlestick Park with the team when the 1989 Loma Prieta earthquake struck the San Francisco Bay Area.
- Baker was manager of the Giants when Barry Bonds set the single-season home run record in 2001.
- Baker was manager of the Cubs when the Steve Bartman incident occurred during the 2003 National League Championship Series. Baker did not directly witness the play, as his view from Wrigley Field's home dugout was obstructed.
- Baker was present as a manager for two of the three no-hitters thrown during the postseason. He was manager of the losing Reds when Roy Halladay threw a no-hitter against them in the 2010 National League Division Series, and he was manager of the winning Astros when they threw a no-hitter against the Phillies in the 2022 World Series.
- Baker was manager of the Nationals when Max Scherzer tied the single-game strikeout record on May 11, 2016. He had previously managed Kerry Wood, one of the players who is also tied for the record, during his Cubs tenure.
- Baker was manager of the Nicaragua national team on March 7, 2026 when Ozzie Albies of the Netherlands hit the first walk-off home run in World Baseball Classic history. (Had Nicaragua retired Albies, it would have secured the country's first win at the WBC.)

== See also ==
- List of Major League Baseball All-Star Game managers
- List of Major League Baseball career assists as a left fielder leaders
- List of Major League Baseball career games played as a left fielder leaders
- List of Major League Baseball career home run leaders
- List of Major League Baseball career putouts as a left fielder leaders
- List of Major League Baseball career runs batted in leaders
- List of Major League Baseball managerial wins and winning percentage leaders

== Notes ==
Awards and achievements
Preceded by Mike Schmidt; Andre Dawson	National League Player of the Month; June 1980; July 1983	Succeeded by Bob Horner; Mel Hall
