= Jimmy Wynn =

American baseball player (1942–2020)

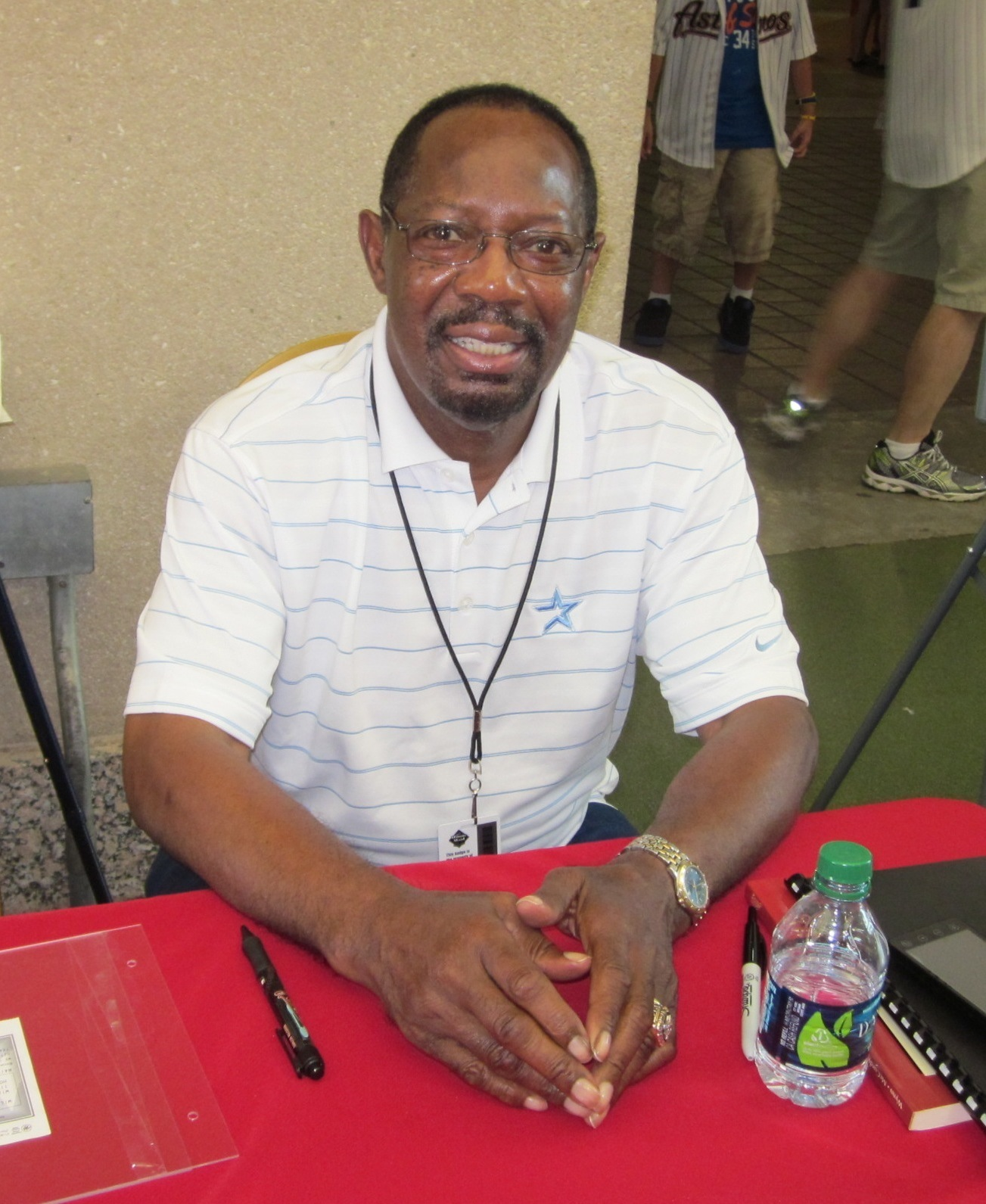
- Wynn in 2011
- Outfielder
- Born: March 12, 1942; Hamilton, Ohio, U.S.
- Died: March 26, 2020 (aged 78); Houston, Texas, U.S.
- Batted: Right Threw: Right

MLB debut
- July 10, 1963, for the Houston Colt .45s

Last MLB appearance
- September 27, 1977, for the Milwaukee Brewers

MLB statistics
- Batting average: .250
- Home runs: 291
- Runs batted in: 964
- Stats at Baseball Reference

Teams
- Houston Colt .45s / Astros (1963–1973); Los Angeles Dodgers (1974–1975); Atlanta Braves (1976); New York Yankees (1977); Milwaukee Brewers (1977)

Career highlights and awards
- 3× All-Star (1967, 1974, 1975); Houston Astros No. 24 retired; Houston Astros Hall of Fame

James Sherman Wynn (March 12, 1942 – March 26, 2020), nicknamed "the Toy Cannon", was an American professional baseball player. He played 15 seasons as a center fielder; he spent ten of his fifteen seasons with the Houston Colt .45s / Astros before playing two All-Star seasons for the Los Angeles Dodgers and then two more seasons with three other teams. Wynn was nicknamed "The Toy Cannon" because his bat was described as having a lot of "pop" for his small size at 5 ft 9 in (1.75 m) and 160 lb (73 kg).

== Career ==
=== Early career ===
Wynn attended Taft High School. After high school, the Cincinnati Reds signed him as an amateur free agent in 1962. He played that season with the Tampa Tarpons in the Florida State League. He played mostly at third base, batting .290 with 14 home runs.

=== Houston Astros (1963–1973) ===
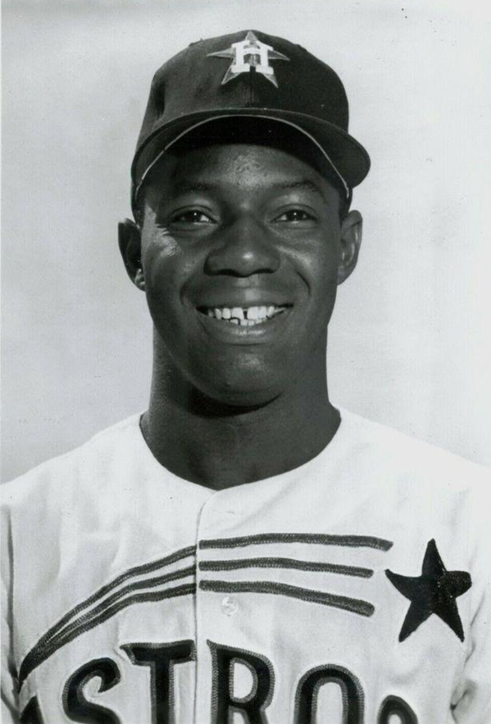
1968 publicity photo of Wynn for the Houston Astros

After the 1962 season, the Houston Colt .45s selected Wynn in the 1962 first-year minor league player draft. Wynn began the 1963 season with the Double-A San Antonio Bullets in the Texas League, and while there split his time between shortstop and third base while batting .288 with 16 home runs in 78 games. He was promoted to the major leagues in July, and made his major league debut on July 10. Starting at shortstop, he went 1-for-4 with a stolen base. He split his time during the rest of that initial season between shortstop and the outfield, most often playing left field. He finished the season having played in 70 games, having 61 hits, four home runs, 27 runs batted in, four stolen bases and a .244 batting average.

Having struggled defensively at shortstop, Wynn was converted to a full-time outfielder in 1964. He opened the season as the Colt .45s starting center fielder, but was sent back to the minor leagues in June, with Mike White taking over. He was called up in September, and finished the season starting in center field. He ended the season having played 67 games, with 49 hits, five home runs, 18 runs batted in, five stolen bases, and a .224 batting average.

He played his first full season the following year, playing in 157 games; accordingly, he had 155 hits, 22 home runs, 73 runs batted in, 43 stolen bases and a .275 batting average and a .371 on-base percentage.

His 1966 season ended abruptly after 105 games after breaking his left arm crashing into the outfield wall at Connie Mack Stadium chasing down a Dick Allen fly ball resulting in a game-winning, inside-the-park home run for Allen and the Philadelphia Phillies in the bottom of the 10th inning on August 1, 1966. He had 107 hits, 18 home runs, 62 runs batted in, 13 stolen bases, a .256 batting average and .321 on-base percentage.

His 1967 season was a return to form, as he played in 158 games, having 148 hits, 37 home runs (a career high), 107 runs batted in, 16 stolen bases, a .249 batting average and a .331 on-base percentage, was named to his first ever All-Star Game and finished 11th in the MVP voting, being edged out by Hank Aaron (and his 39 home runs) in the home run chase for the season in the final days of the season; it has been speculated Wynn may have lost a substantial number of home runs to the lengthy fences in the Astrodome, while Aaron played in the more homer-friendly Atlanta–Fulton County Stadium. Aaron himself commented he considered Wynn the season's home run champion. Perhaps Wynn's most famous home run came on June 10 of the 1967 season at Crosley Field. The shot, which came in the eighth inning of the Astros' 8–3 loss to the Cincinnati Reds, cleared the 58-foot scoreboard in left-center field and landed on Interstate 75 outside the stadium. Five days later, Wynn became the first Houston batter to hit three home runs in one game as his Astros defeated the San Francisco Giants 6–2 at the Astrodome. In the first game of a doubleheader against the Pittsburgh Pirates one month later, on July 23, Wynn hit another tape measure home run, the ball clearing Forbes Field's center-field wall 457 feet (139 m) from home plate.

The following season, he played in 156 games while having 146 hits, 85 runs, 26 home runs, 67 runs batted in, 11 stolen bases with a .269 batting average and a .376 on-base percentage, although he walked 90 times and struck out 131 times.

His 1969 season had its highs and lows, as he played in 149 games while having 133 hits, 113 runs, 33 home runs, 87 runs batted in, 23 stolen bases, 148 walks (leading the major leagues) for a .269 batting average and a .436 on-base percentage, although he struck out 142 times. He successfully got on base at least once in 52 straight games from June 4 to August 3; the mark was tied by Greg Gross six years later, which still stands as a franchise record. Wynn finished 15th in the MVP balloting.The following year, he played in 157 games while having 156 hits, 82 runs, 27 home runs, 88 runs batted in, 24 stolen bases, 106 walks, 96 strike outs, and a .282 batting average with a .394 on-base percentage.

On December 21, 1970 Wynn was stabbed by his wife during a fight on their wedding anniversary. Wynn had brandished an unloaded shotgun prior to the stabbing and later stated the incident was his fault. The 1971 season would be the worst of his career up that point. He played in 123 games (his least since 1966), having 82 hits, 38 runs, seven home runs, 45 runs batted in, 10 stolen bases, 56 walks, 63 strike outs, with a .203 batting average and .302 on-base percentage. On a positive note, he became the first Astro to record 1,000 hits during the season. He returned to form the following season, playing in 145 games while having 148 hits, 117 runs, 24 home runs, 90 runs batted in, 17 stolen bases, 103 walks, 99 strikeouts, and a .273 batting average and a .389 on-base percentage. The 1973 season was his final one with the Astros. He played in 139 games, having 106 hits, 90 runs, 20 home runs, 55 runs batted in, 14 stolen bases, 91 walks, 102 strikeouts with a .220 batting average and a .347 on-base percentage.

=== Los Angeles Dodgers (1974–1975) ===
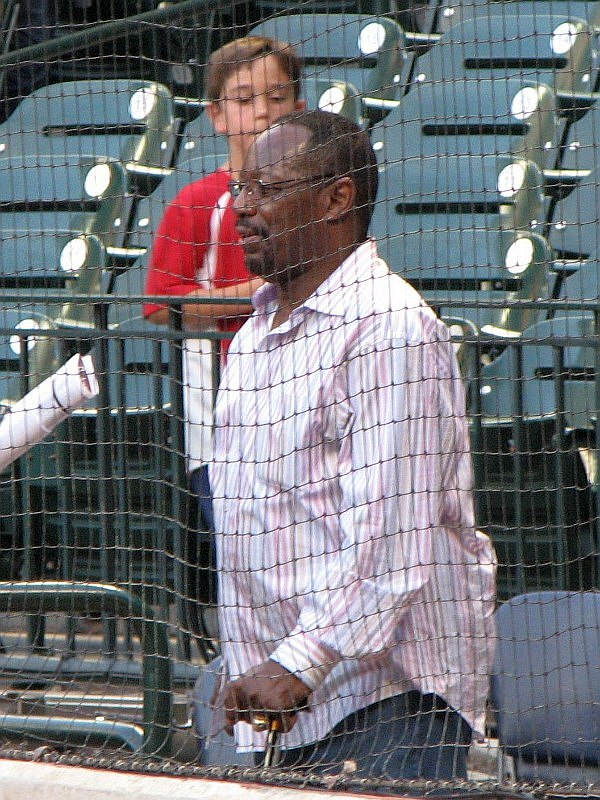
Wynn at Minute Maid Park, 2010

Wynn was traded from the Astros to the Los Angeles Dodgers for Claude Osteen and minor-league right-handed pitcher David Culpepper at the Winter Meetings on December 6, 1973. In his first season with the Dodgers, he played in 150 games, having 145 hits, 104 runs, 32 home runs, 108 runs batted in (a career high), 18 stolen bases, 108 walks, 104 strikeouts, with a .271 batting average and a .387 on-base percentage. He was named to the All-Star Game that season, while finishing 5th in the MVP balloting and being awarded by The Sporting News with the Comeback Player of the Year Award in helping the Dodgers win the National League pennant. In the 1974 NLCS, he had just two hits in 10 at-bats, although he walked nine times and had two runs batted in and scored four runs while they beat the Pittsburgh Pirates in four games. In the 1974 World Series, he went 3-for-16 while having two runs batted in and his only postseason home run was off Rollie Fingers in the 9th inning of Game 1 in a losing cause.

Wynn started 1975 well, although a bad shoulder injury limited his effectiveness at the plate and making throws from center field, thus he was moved to left field. In his second (and last season) with the Dodgers, he played in 130 games, having 102 hits, 80 runs, 18 home runs, 58 runs batted in, seven stolen bases, 110 walks, 77 strikeouts with a .248 batting average and .403 on-base percentage. He was named to the All-Star Game, his third and final selection. Wynn homered in the 2nd inning of the All-Star Game that year, leading the National League to a 6-3 victory.

=== Atlanta Braves (1976) ===
He was traded along with Jerry Royster, Tom Paciorek and Lee Lacy from the Dodgers to the Atlanta Braves for Dusty Baker and Ed Goodson on November 17, 1975. In his only season with the Braves, Wynn played in 148 games, having 93 hits, 75 runs, 17 home runs, 66 runs batted in, 16 stolen bases, 127 walks (leading the major leagues), 111 strikeouts, a .207 batting average and a .377 on-base percentage.

=== New York Yankees / Milwaukee Brewers (1977) ===
On November 30, he was purchased by the New York Yankees. He was released by the Yankees on July 14, then was signed as a free agent by the Milwaukee Brewers 12 days later. He played in 30 games for the Yankees and 36 for the Brewers, for a total of 66 games, garnering 34 total hits, one home run, 13 runs batted in, four stolen bases, 32 walks, 47 strikeouts, with a .175 batting average and a .289 on-base percentage.

On October 28, he was released by the Brewers.

=== Career statistics ===
In 1,920 games over 15 seasons, Wynn had 8,011 plate appearances and compiled a .250 batting average (1,665-for-6,653) with 1,105 runs, 285 doubles, 39 triples, 291 home runs, 964 RBI, 225 stolen bases, 1,224 base on balls, 1,427 strikeouts, .366 on-base percentage and .436 slugging percentage. Defensively, he posted a career .980 fielding percentage. Among players with a batting average of .250 or lower, he has the third highest wins above replacement (WAR) at 55.8, with only Graig Nettles and Darrell Evans having a higher WAR. He also had eight seasons with an Adjusted OPS+ of 130 (100 is considered league average) eight times. His 1,291 hits and 223 home runs with the Astros were franchise records when he was traded away from the team. In the five decades since his last game with Houston, seven players have passed him in hits but only Jeff Bagwell, Lance Berkman, Craig Biggio, and Jose Altuve have passed him in home runs.

== Following retirement ==
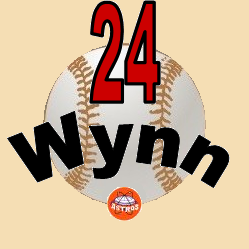
Jimmy Wynn's number 24 was retired by the Houston Astros in 2005.

Wynn's number 24 was retired by the Astros on June 25, 2005, when the Astros played the Texas Rangers. Jason Lane, who wore Wynn's 24 before the ceremony, changed his number to 16 as a result.

Wynn previously served as a post-game analyst on Houston Astros television broadcasts on FSN Houston. He also served as a community outreach executive for the team.

== In popular culture ==
In the 1995 film Apollo 13, television footage of Wynn rounding third base is shown as the Apollo astronauts broadcast what they erroneously think is a live feed to a national audience.

On the October 7, 1974 episode of The Tonight Show Starring Johnny Carson, Wynn faced women's softball pitcher Rosie Black. He struck out in four pitches.

== Death ==
Wynn died on March 26, 2020, two weeks after his 78th birthday in Houston, Texas. No cause of death was given. He was married to Marie, had a daughter named Kimberly and a son named James Jr.

== See also ==
- Houston Astros award winners and league leaders
- List of Major League Baseball career home run leaders
- List of Major League Baseball career runs scored leaders
- List of Major League Baseball career stolen bases leaders
