= KROY (AM) =

Radio station in San Saba, Texas

Coordinates: 31.1907°N 98.7155°W

- San Saba, Texas; United States
- Frequency: 1410 kHz
- Branding: Timeless AM 1410

Programming
- Format: "A Little Bit Rock and Roll"/70s-80s
- Affiliations: Westwood One

Ownership
- Owner: Suzanne Henderson
- Sister stations: KNUZ

History
- First air date: 1954 (as KBAL)
- Former call signs: KBAL (1954–2007); KNVR (2007–2018)

Technical information
- Licensing authority: FCC
- Facility ID: 65316
- Class: D
- Power: 800 watts day; 203 watts night
- Translator: 100.3 K262DF (San Saba)

Links
- Public license information: Public file; LMS
- Website: knuz106.com

KROY (1410 AM) is a radio station broadcasting a 70s and 80s pop/rock/adult standards/MOR format. Licensed to San Saba, Texas, United States, the station is currently owned by Suzanne Henderson, and features programming from Westwood One.
