= KNUZ (FM) =

- San Saba, Texas; United States
- Frequency: 106.1 MHz
- Branding: Texas FM 106

Programming
- Format: Country music

Ownership
- Owner: Roy E. Henderson; (S Content Marketing, LLC)
- Sister stations: KROY

History
- Former call signs: KBAL-FM (1995–2009)

Technical information
- Licensing authority: FCC
- Facility ID: 65315
- Class: A
- ERP: 3,000 watts
- HAAT: 6.0 meters
- Transmitter coordinates: 31°11′26″N 98°42′55″W

Links
- Public license information: Public file; LMS
- Website: Official website

KNUZ (106.1 FM) is a radio station broadcasting a country music format. Licensed to San Saba, Texas, United States, the station is currently owned by Roy E. Henderson, through licensee S Content Marketing, LLC.
