= KULF =

- Bellville, Texas; United States
- Broadcast area: Victoria, Texas, Greater Houston
- Frequency: 1090 kHz

Programming
- Format: Asian language

Ownership
- Owner: James Su; (Trade Route Media, Inc.)

History
- First air date: November 19, 1974; 51 years ago (license)
- Last air date: September 30, 2022; 3 years ago
- Former call signs: KACO (1974–1993); KFRD (1993–1997); KNUZ (1997–November 20, 2009); KBAL (November 20–December 14, 2009)

Technical information
- Facility ID: 48653
- Class: D
- Power: 1,000 watts day only
- Transmitter coordinates: 29°56′5.8″N 96°6′47.9″W
- Translator: See § Translator

KULF (1090 kHz) was an AM daytimer radio station, paired with an FM translator, based in Bellville, Texas. Licensed to Bellville, Texas, United States, it served the Victoria and Houston regional area. The station was last owned by James Su, through licensee Trade Route Media, Inc.

The station operated on a Class D daytime license on 1090 kHz. Because KULF shared the same frequency as clear-channel station KAAY in Little Rock, Arkansas, it only broadcast during daytime hours.

The KULF call sign previously resided on 790 AM in Houston from August 1970 to early July 1982.

== History ==
=== Birth of Radio 1090 KACO ===
The station signed on the air in 1974 as Austin County’s first and only licensed radio station. It was owned by Mr. and Mrs. J. Lee Dittert. 1090 was granted the calls of KACO, representing not just service to its community of license Bellville, but to the entire Austin County population. KACO started as a 250-watt daytimer featuring a country & western format.

=== KACO sold; Henderson stewardship ===
In 1990, the Dittert family sold the facility to Roy Henderson, with the original KACO call letters being retired in 1993, as 1090 changed its callsign to KFRD, which itself had been located at 980 AM in Rosenberg, Texas, since its sign-on in 1949.

Four years later, 1090 received a grant to change its call letters again and use the KNUZ calls that had occupied 1230 AM in Houston since the 1940s. As KNUZ, and under Roy Henderson's direction, the station simulcasted "Lite 94.1" KLTR out of Brenham.

In November 2009, the facility dropped the KNUZ call letters and briefly used KBAL, until a switch could be made with the co-owned facility in San Saba. As a result of the call switch, the KNUZ calls are now used for 106.1 FM in San Saba, the former KBAL.

=== Sale to JLF Communications; flip to brokered ===
In December 2009, the station was sold for a reported $500,000 by Roy E. Henderson to JHT Ventures, Inc., 100% controlled by Janice Hollan. JHT sold KULF to Jerome Friemel's JLF Communications, LLC at a purchase price of $10,000; the transaction was consummated on January 29, 2013. 1090 returned to the air with an oldies format stunt that lasted until paid programming could be secured for the signal to air. Once that occurred, the temporary oldies format was dropped and replaced with Spanish language Christian programming "La Luz". This programming would prove to be short lived as well.

In August 2015, JLF Communications added a translator at 102.5, bringing 1090's programming to FM.

In January 2016, KULF was stopped as a result of non-payment of rent to the landowner on which the KULF towers and transmission equipment reside. According to radio insider sources, the landowner had a court order that gave him legal possession of all equipment related to KULF, sans the broadcast license itself. The Houston FCC agent took KULF off of the air, as for a period of over a month, 1090 remained on air both day and night, running 1,000 watts of dead air.

As of May 2016, KULF had returned to the air at full power, resuming programming.

Effective May 1, 2019, JLF Communications sold KULF and translator K273CD to James Su's Trade Route Media, Inc. for $2.3 million.

Trade Route Media surrendered KULF's license to the FCC on September 30, 2022; the station's license was cancelled on October 3, 2022.

== Translator ==
Broadcast translator for KULF
Call sign	Frequency	City of license	FID	ERP (W)	HAAT	Class	FCC info	Notes
K273CD	102.5 FM	Bellville, Texas	144570	250	102.5 m (336 ft)	D	LMS	First air date: March 2, 2015
